= 2020 Birthday Honours (New Zealand) =

Awards list for New Zealand

2020 Queen's Birthday Honours
- Previous: 2020 New Year Honours; Next: 2021 New Year Honours
- Type: New Zealand royal honours: New Zealand Order of Merit; Queen's Service Order; Queen's Service Medal; Distinguished Service Decoration
- Date: 1 June 2020
- Country: New Zealand

Highlights
- Total recipients: 179

The 2020 Queen's Birthday Honours in New Zealand, celebrating the official birthday of Queen Elizabeth II, were appointments made by the Queen in her right as Queen of New Zealand, on the advice of the New Zealand government, to various orders and honours to reward and highlight good works by New Zealanders. They were announced on 1 June 2020.

The recipients of honours are listed here as they were styled before their new honour.

== New Zealand Order of Merit ==
=== Dame Companion (DNZM) ===
- Distinguished Professor Jane Elizabeth Harding ONZM – of Kohimarama. For services to neonatology and perinatology.
- Dr Karen Olive Poutasi CNZM – of Raumati Beach. For services to education and the state.
- Aroha Hōhipera Reriti-Crofts CBE JP – of Redwood. For services to Māori and the community.
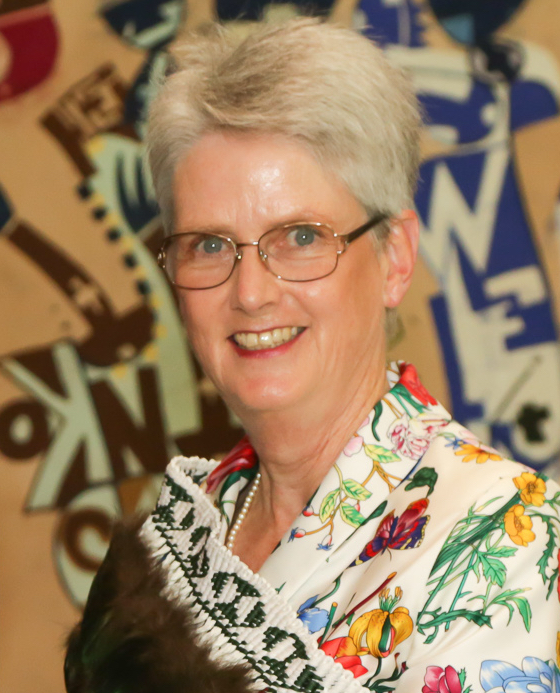
Dame Jane Harding

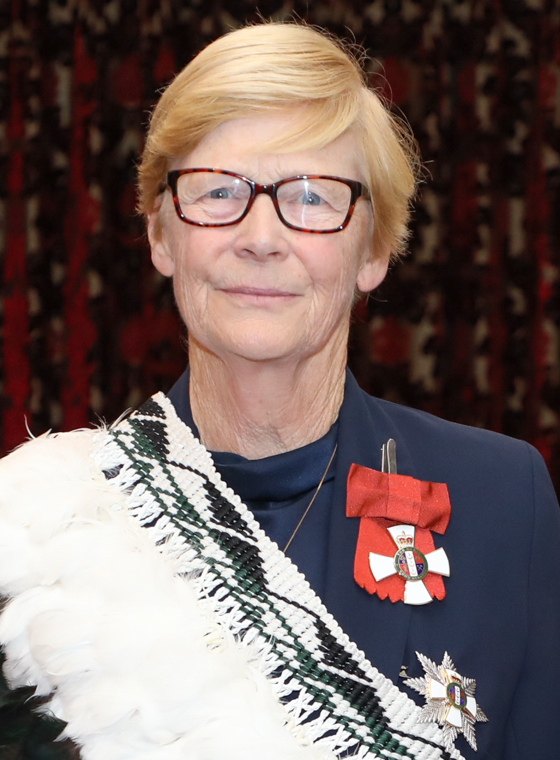
Dame Karen Poutasi

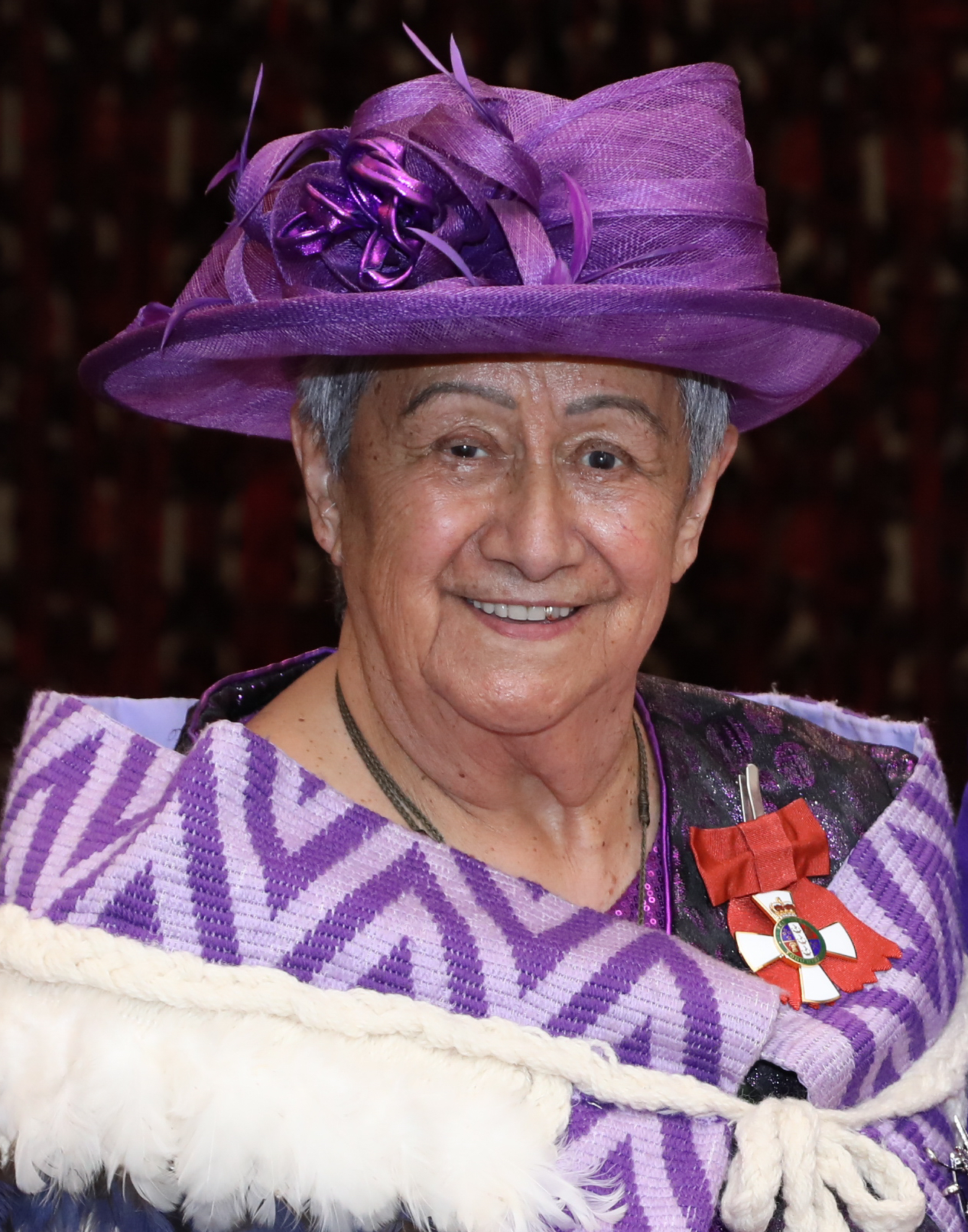
Dame Aroha Reriti-Crofts

=== Knight Companion (KNZM) ===
- Professor Robert Bartlett Elliott CNZM – of Remuera. For services to medical research.
- Professor Derek Arana Te Ahi Lardelli ONZM – of Whataupoko. For services to Māori art.
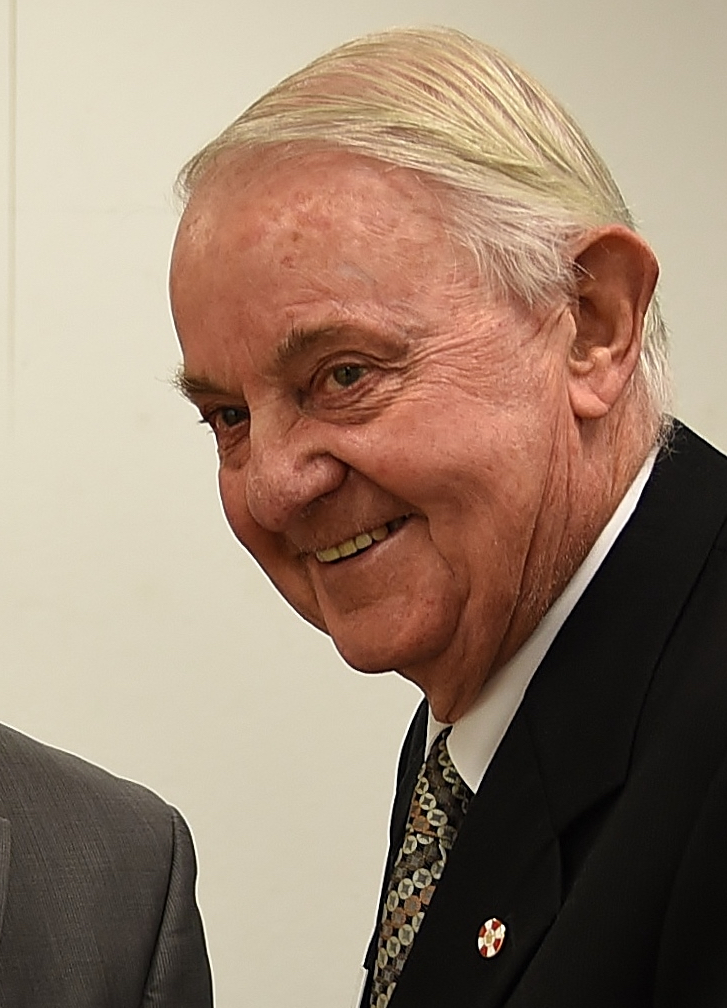
Sir Robert Elliott

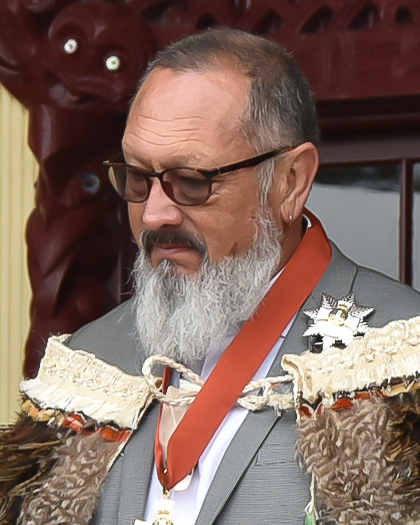
Sir Derek Lardelli

=== Companion (CNZM) ===
- Turanga Hoturoa Barclay-Kerr – of Whatawhata. For services to Māori and heritage commemoration.
- Michael Dennis Bush MNZM – of Roseneath. For services to the New Zealand Police and the community.
- Maureen Patricia Corby – of Parnell. For services to early childhood education.
- Dr Tessa Duder OBE – of Castor Bay. For services to literature.
- David Charles Ellis – of Te Ākau. For services to the Thoroughbred industry.
- Elizabeth Fiona Knox ONZM – of Kelburn. For services to literature.
- Barry John Maister ONZM – of Avonhead. For services to sport and the community.
- James Bruce McKenzie – of Masterton. For services to the cattle industry.
- Professor John Norman Nacey – of Kelburn. For services to health and education.
- George Ngaei ONZM – of Gladstone, Invercargill. For services to health and the Pacific community.
- Rosslyn Joy Noonan – of Grey Lynn. For services to human rights.
- Justine Gay Bronwyn Smyth – of Milford. For services to governance and women.
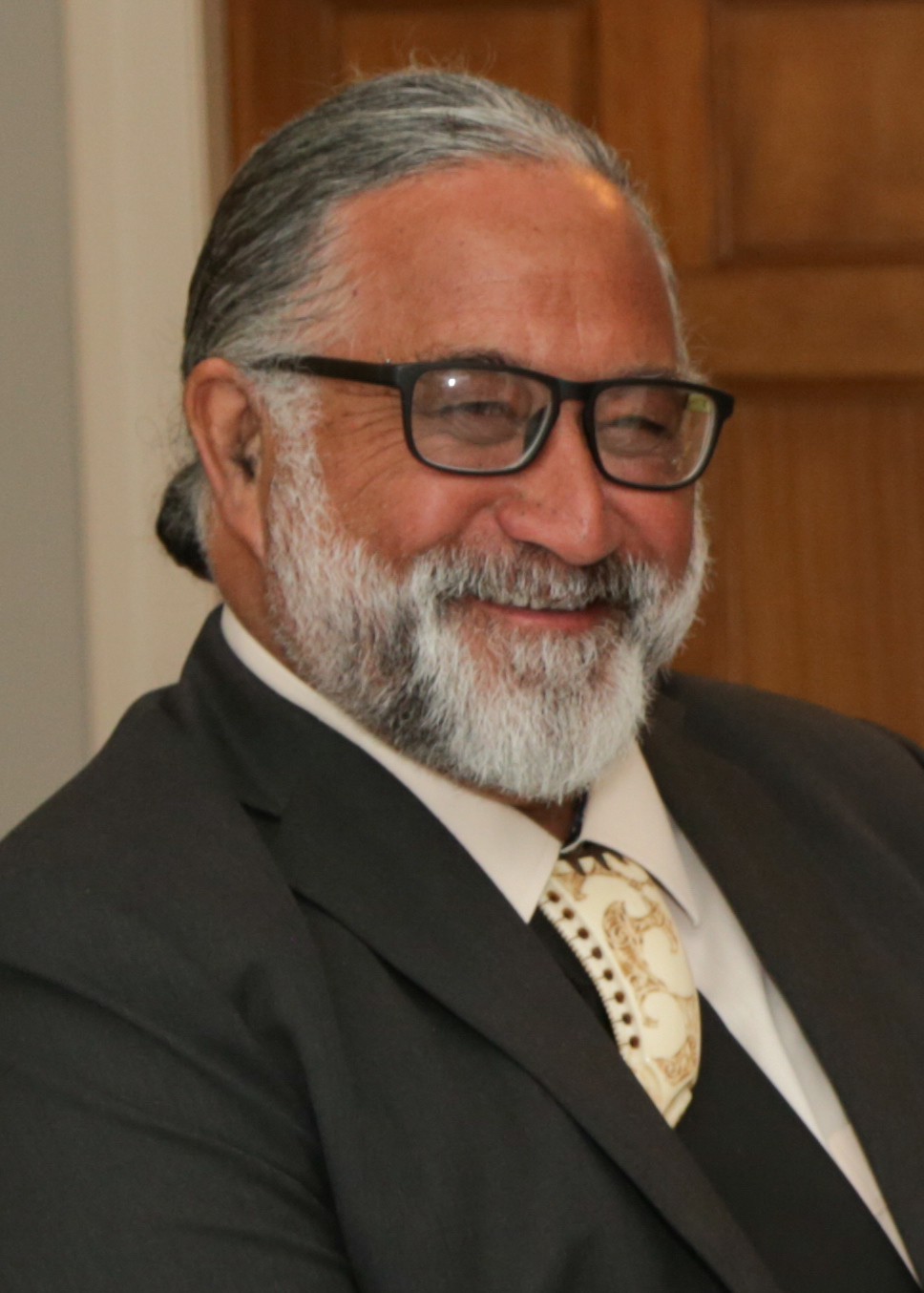
Hoturoa Barclay-Kerr

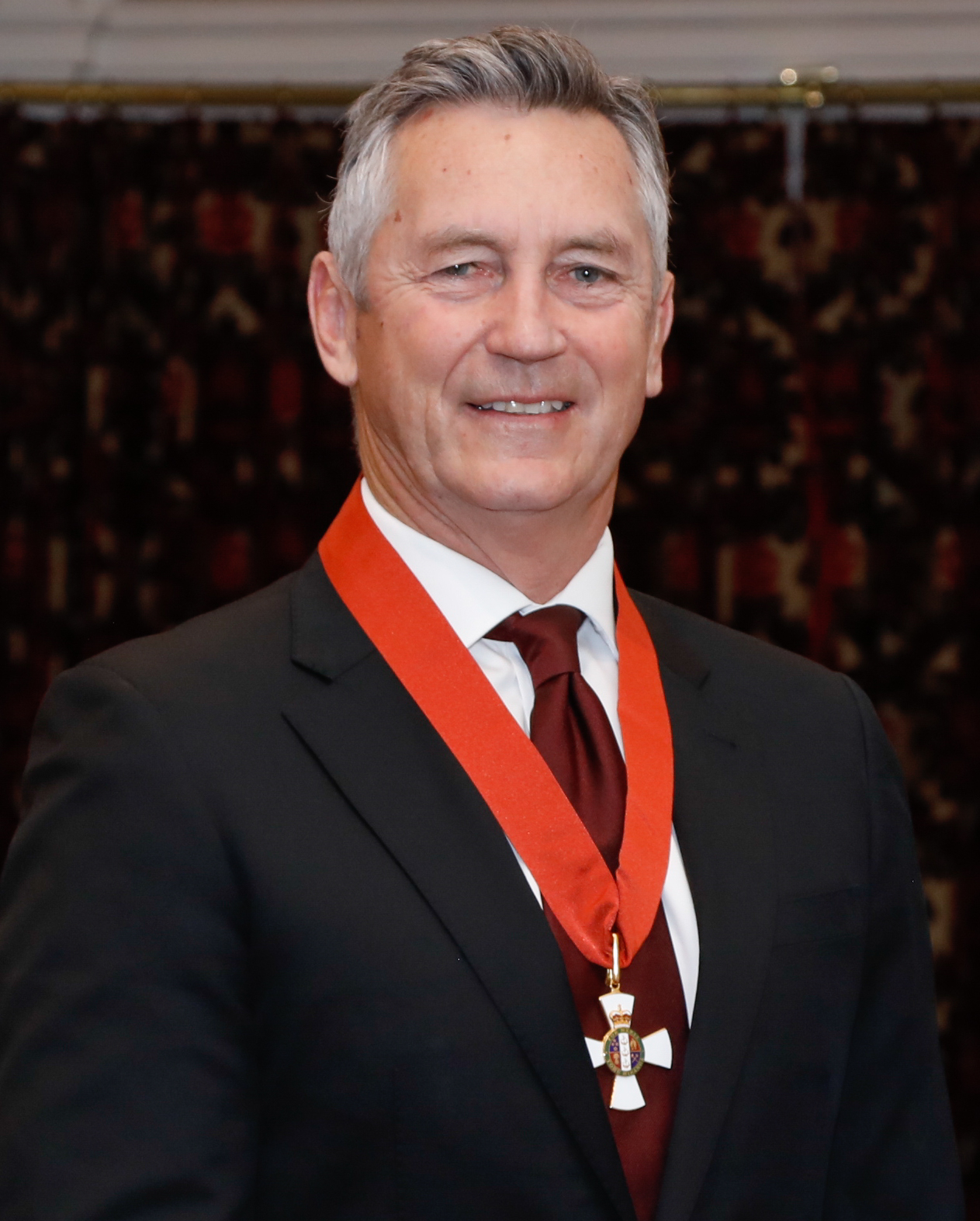
Mike Bush

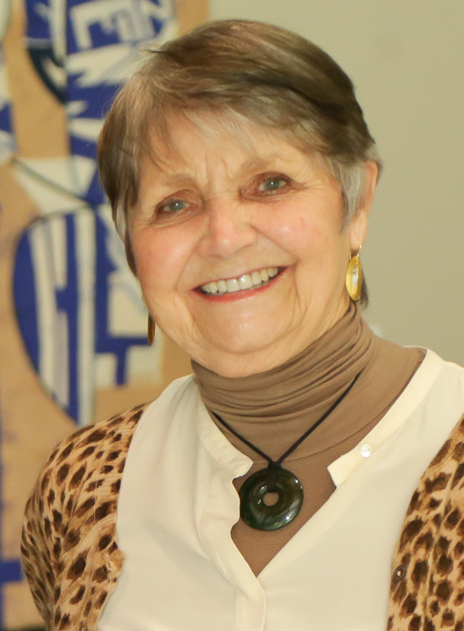
Maureen Corby

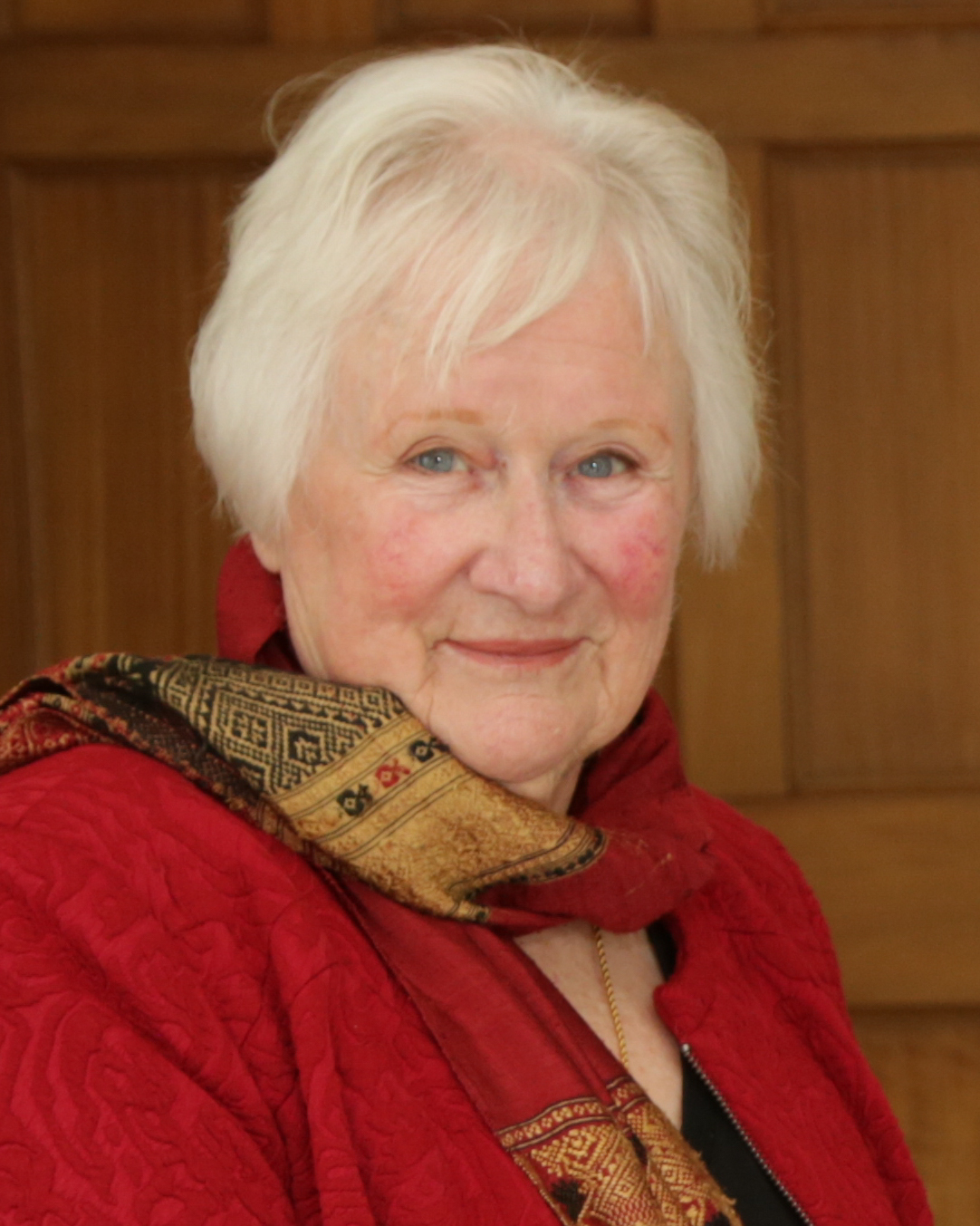
Tessa Duder

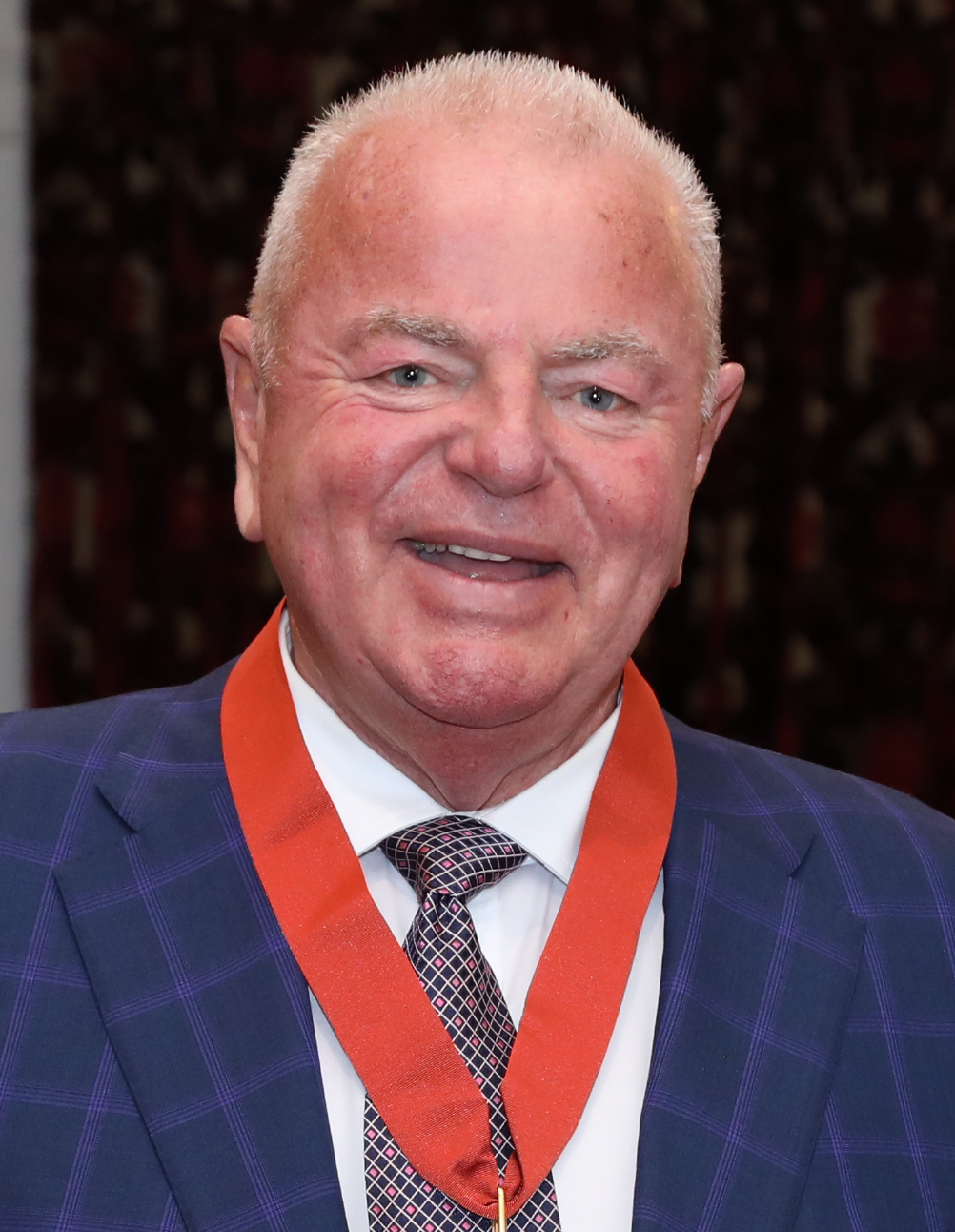
David Ellis

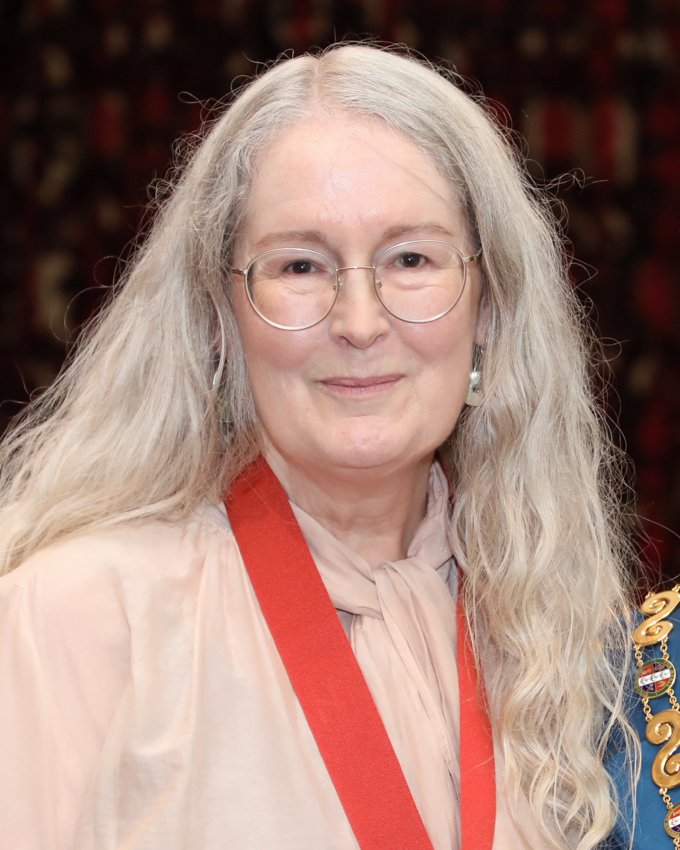
Elizabeth Knox

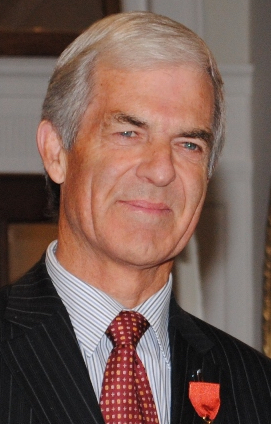
Barry Maister

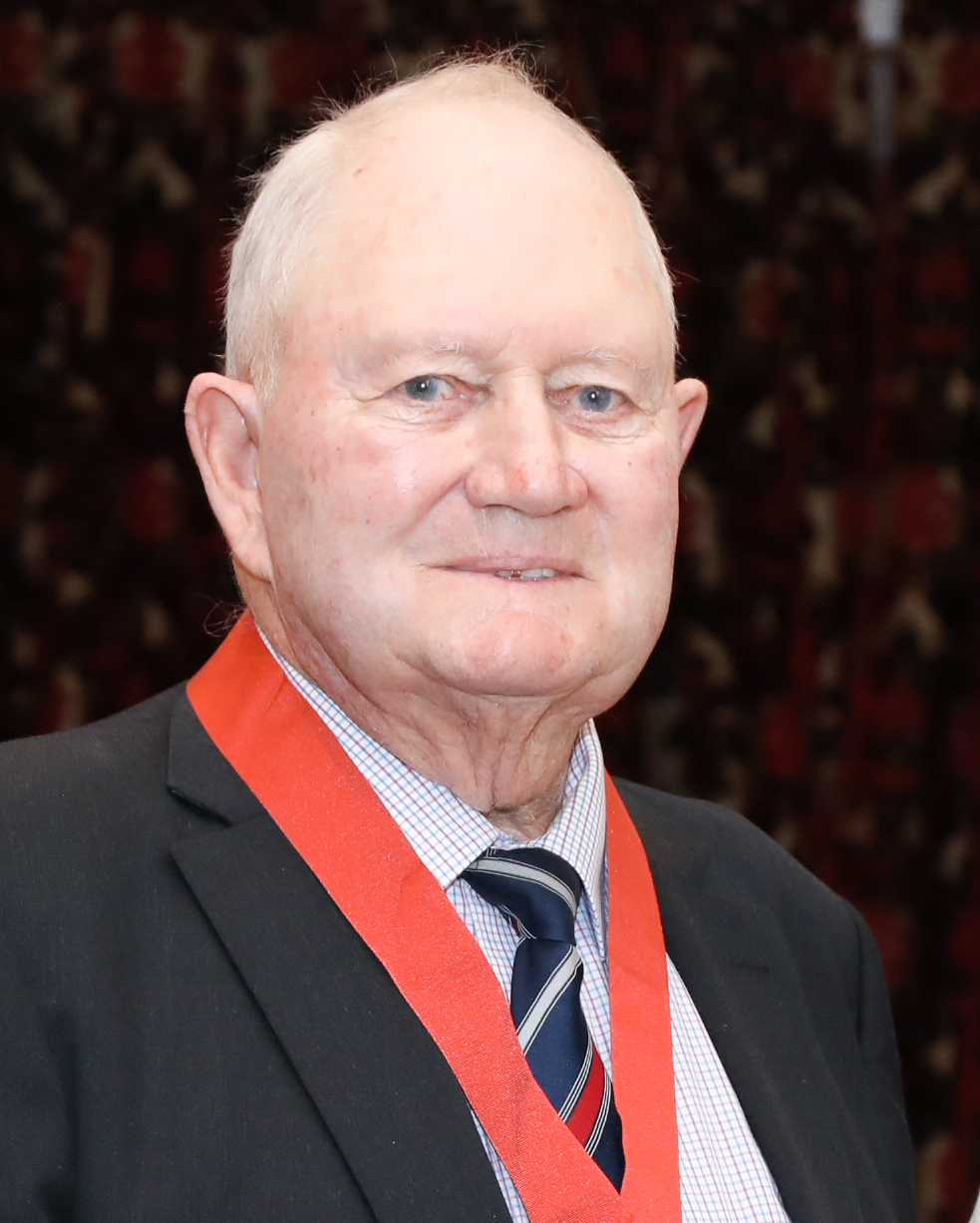
Bruce McKenzie

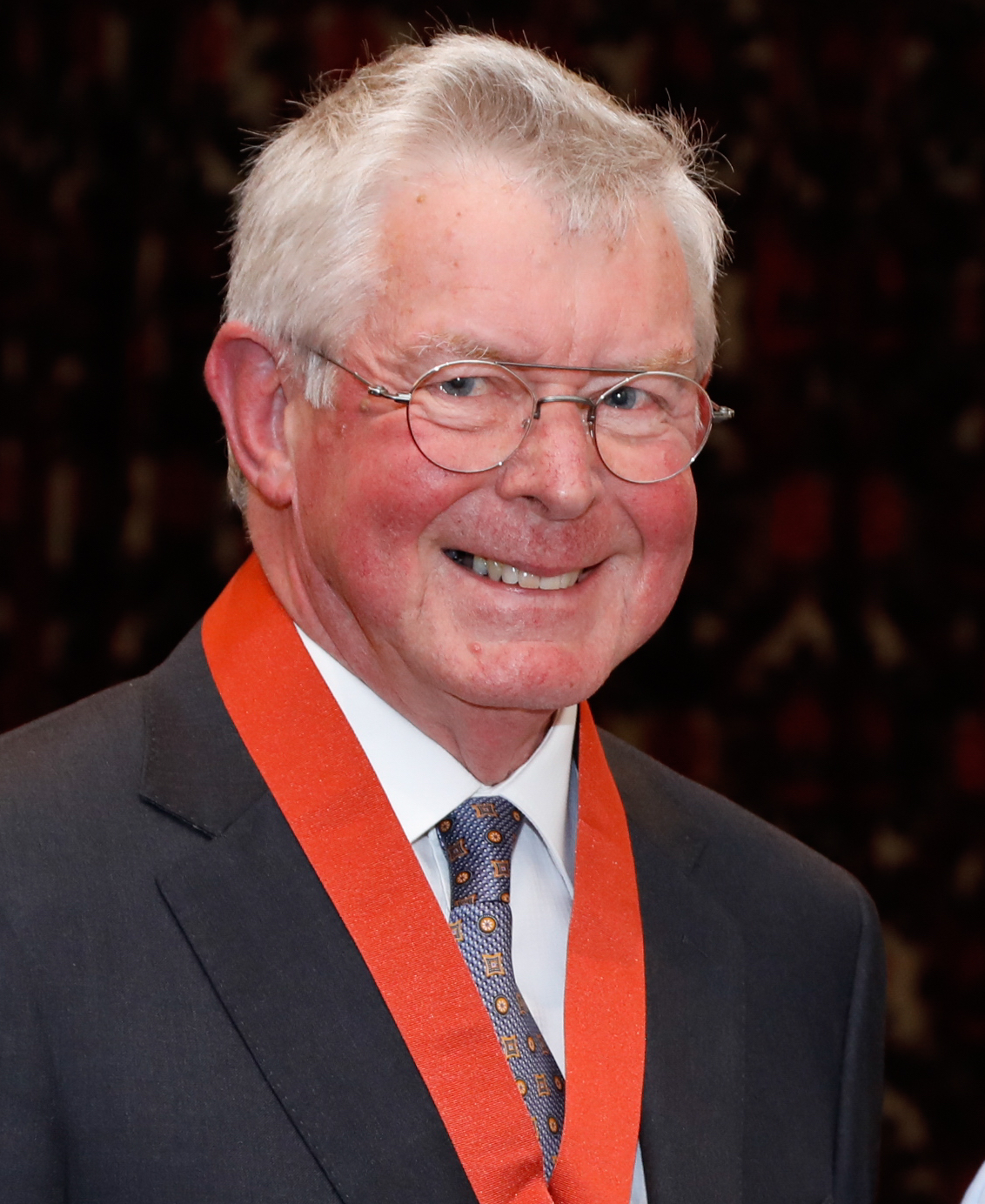
John Nacey

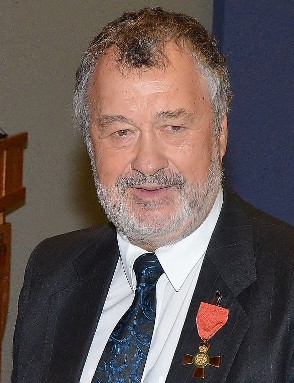
George Ngaei

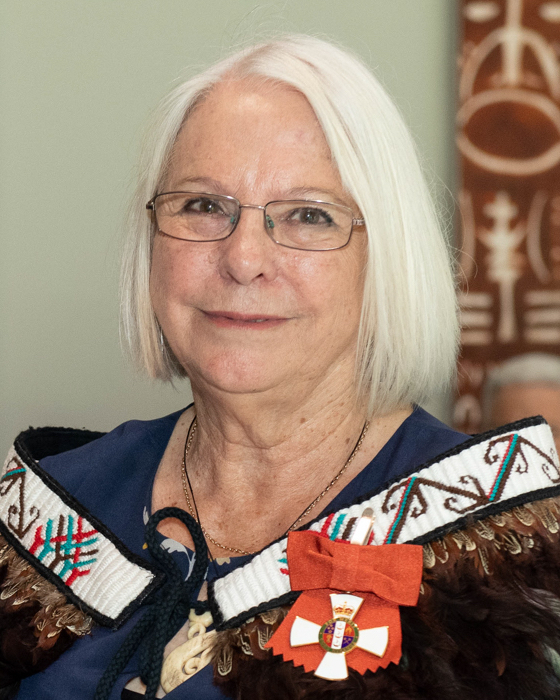
Ros Noonan

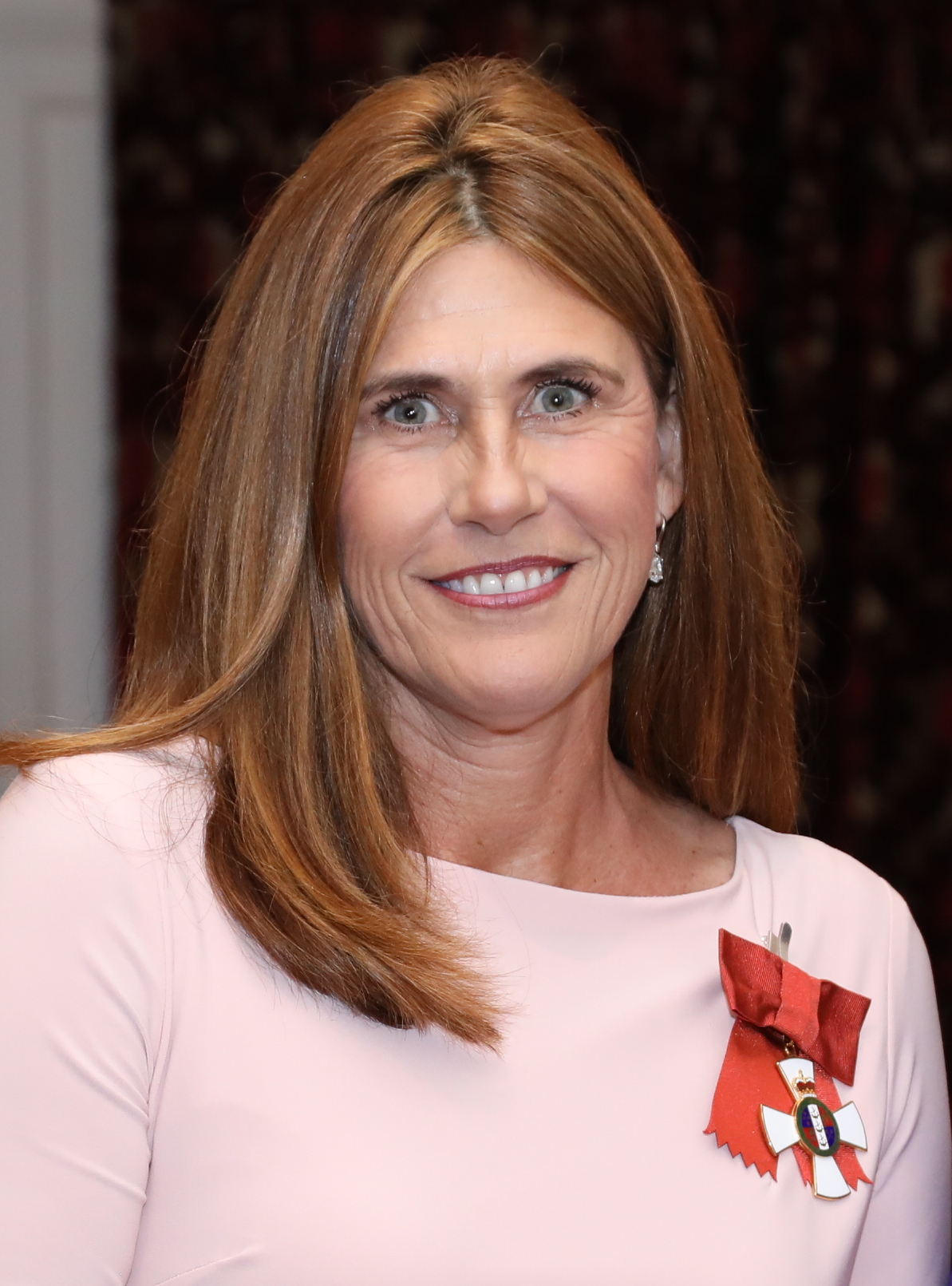
Justine Smyth

=== Officer (ONZM) ===
- Barbara Frances Ala'alatoa MNZM – of Māngere. For services to education.
- Jeanne Lorraine Begej – of Shirley. For services to ice figure skating.
- Anthony Andre Bonne – of Ōhope. For services to local government and the community.
- Taika David Cohen (Taika Waititi) – of Los Angeles. For services to film.
- Distinguished Professor Marston Donald Edward Conder – of Epsom. For services to mathematics.
- Derek Rex Crowther – of Devonport. For services to the motor vehicle industry.
- Judith Ann Darragh – of Grey Lynn. For services to the arts.
- Dr Daryle Elizabeth Anne Deering – of Ilam. For services to nursing, particularly mental health and addiction nursing.
- James Edward Doherty JP – of Kaingaroa Forest. For services to Māori and conservation.
- Adjunct Associate Professor Rosemary Ann Du Plessis – of Cashmere. For services to women and education.
- Professor Alec Joseph Ekeroma – of Apia. For services to health and the Pacific community.
- Dr Garry Vernon Forgeson – of Feilding. For services to oncology.
- Dr Jan Elizabeth Gregor – of Harewood. For services to water safety and public health.
- James Arthur Griffin – of Grey Lynn. For services to the television and film industries.
- Joan Frances Harnett-Kindley – of Wānaka. For services to netball and the real estate industry.
- Mary Helen Holm – of New Lynn. For services to financial literacy education.
- Terence John Kayes – of Mount Eden. For services to the engineering industry.
- Professor Ian David Lambie – of Mount Eden. For services to clinical psychology.
- Anthony Bruce Lepper JP – of Alexandra. For services to sports administration and local government.
- David Robert Maurice Ling – of Mangawhai Heads. For services to the publishing industry.
- Vicki Louise Masson – of Pauanui. For services to perinatal and maternal health.
- Beverley Ann May – of Morrinsville. For services to cycling.
- Dr Anthony John O'Brien – of Grey Lynn. For services to mental health nursing.
- Dr Brian Thomas Pauling – of Seatoun. For services to broadcasting and education.
- Murray Powell – of Hamilton. For services to wildlife conservation and the deer industry.
- Thomas Richard Barton Rainey – of Cashmere. For services to music and music education.
- Kieran James Read – of Belfast. For services to rugby.
- Anne Lesley Richardson – of Hororata. For services to wildlife conservation.
- Avis Janett Ann Rishworth – of Lawrence. For services to women.
- Alistair Norman Spierling – of Greytown. For services to the state and the community.
- James Ronald Tomlin – of St Clair. For services to art education.
- Dr Brian Lindsay Turner – of Oturehua. For services to literature and poetry.
- Āni Pātene Gazala Wainui JP – of Glengarry, Invercargill. For services to Māori language education.
- Lisa Jacqueline Woolley – of Titirangi. For services to the community and governance.
- David John Zwartz – of Kelburn. For services to the Jewish and interfaith communities.
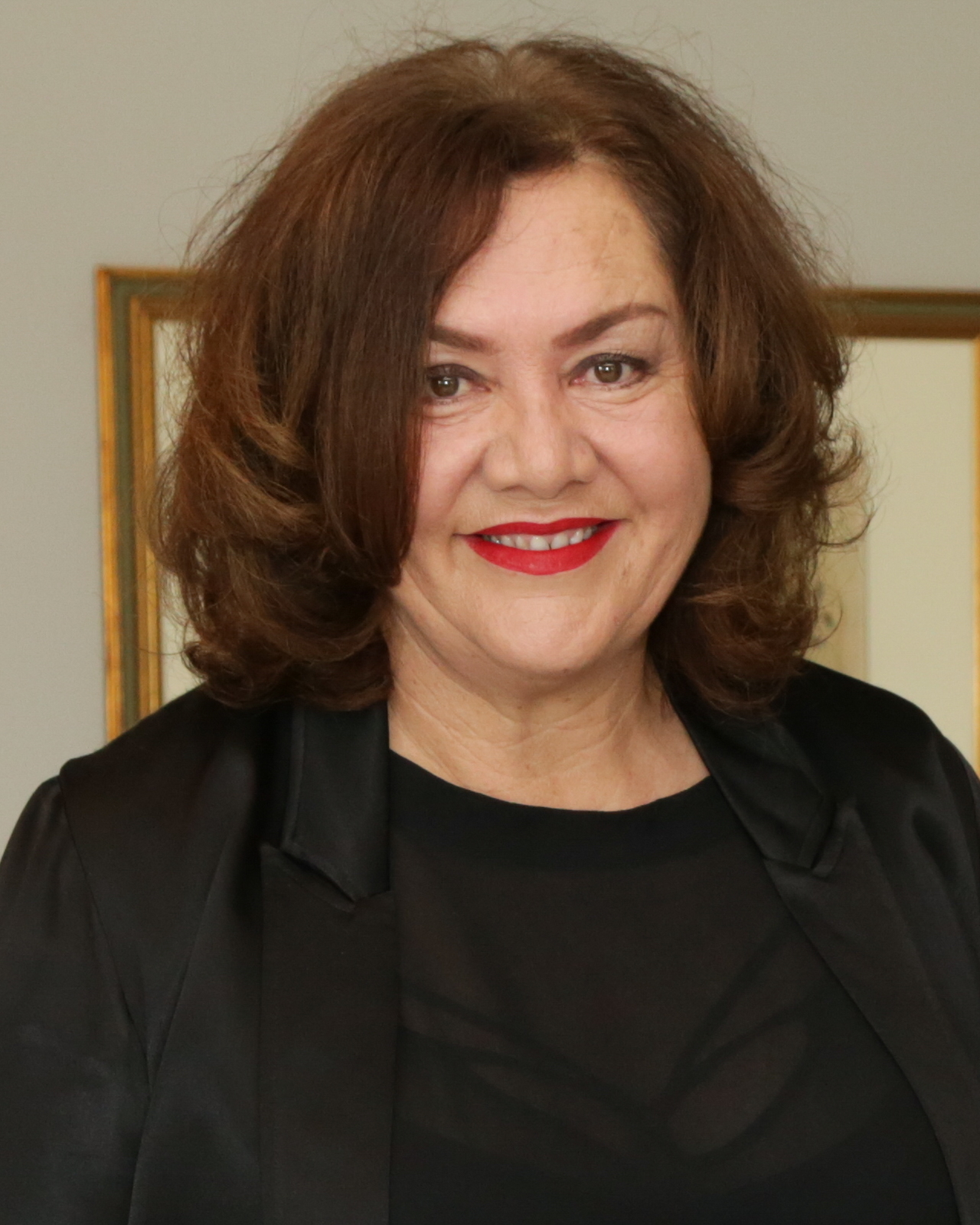
Barbara Ala'alatoa

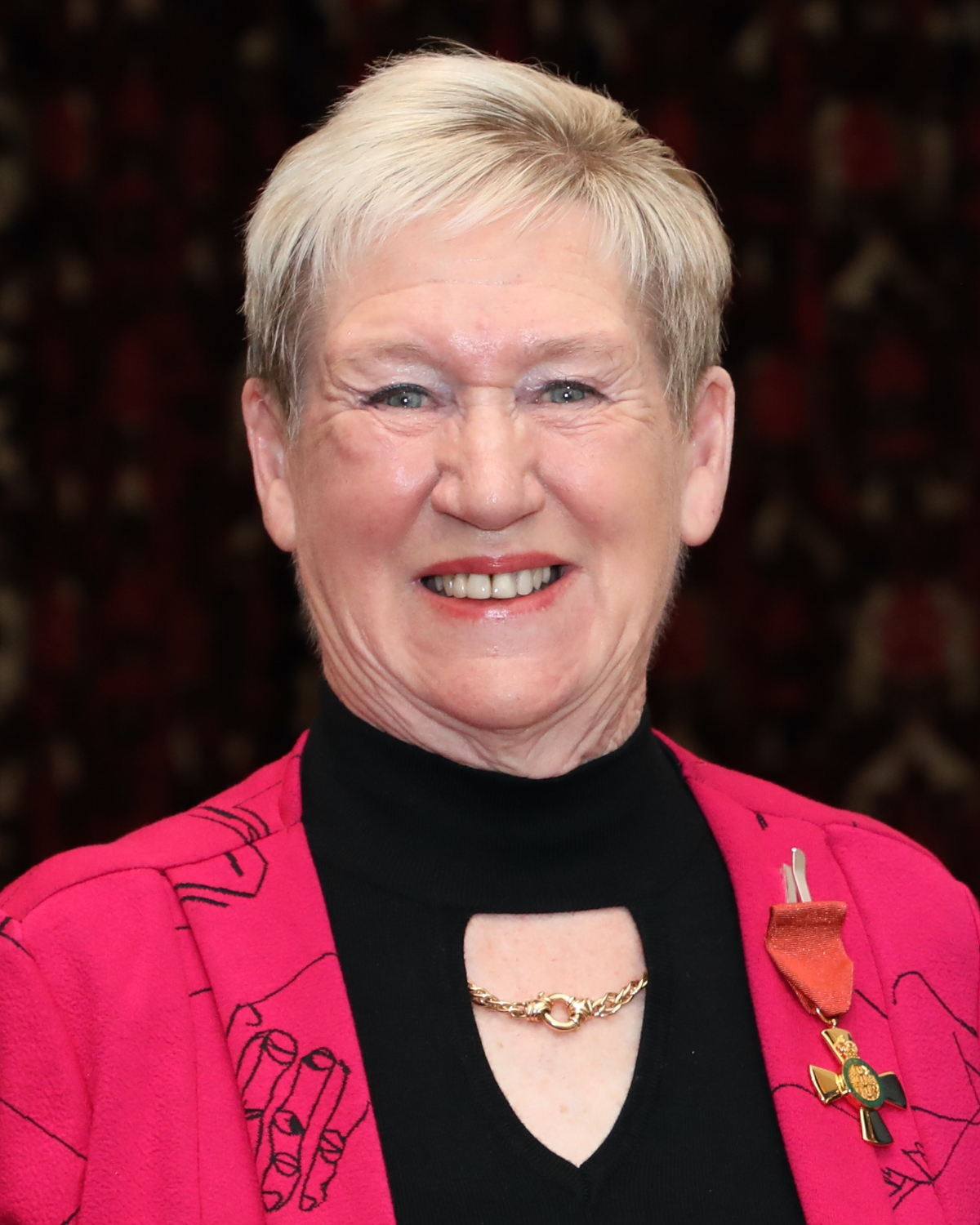
Jeanne Begej

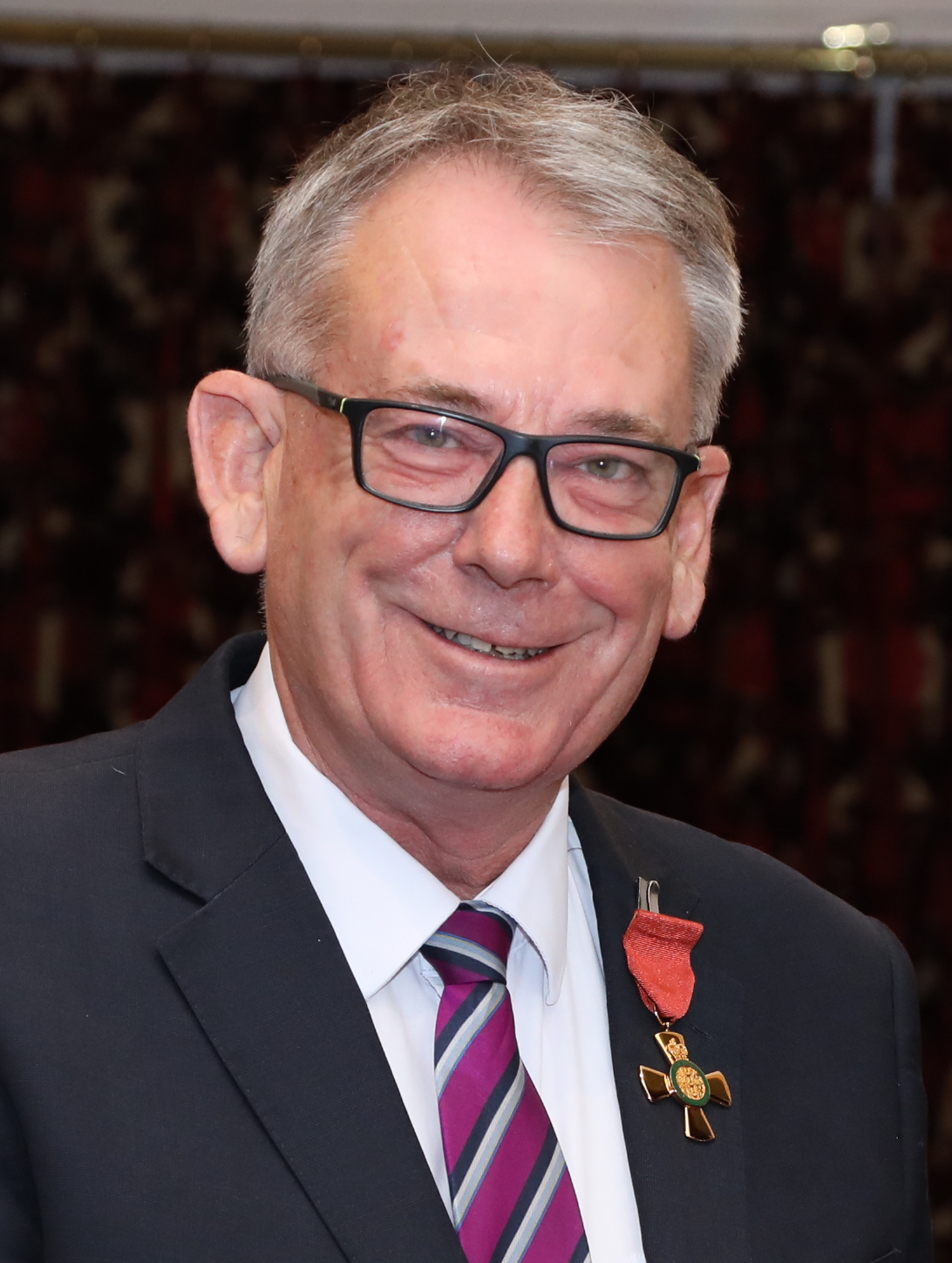
Tony Bonne

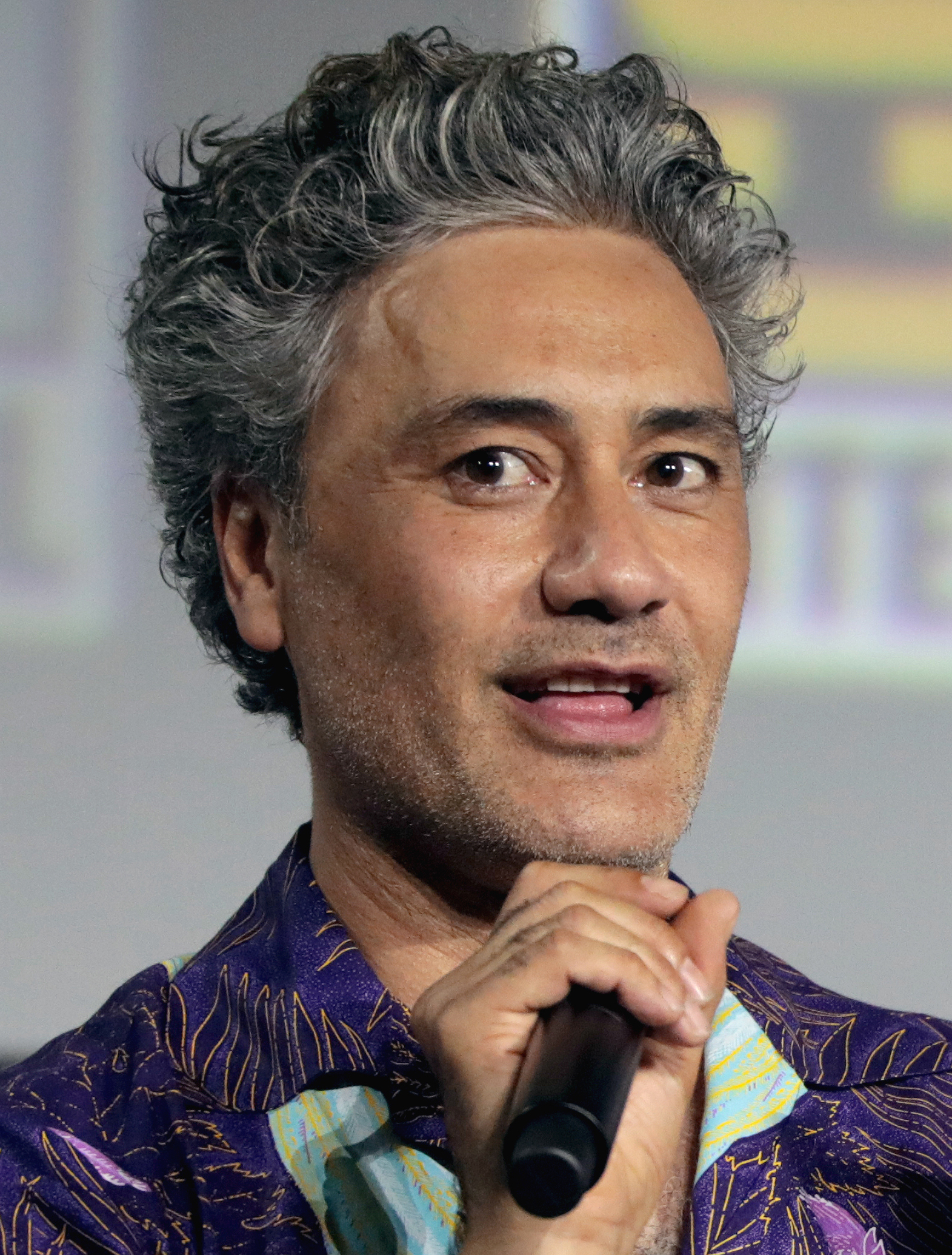
Taika Waititi

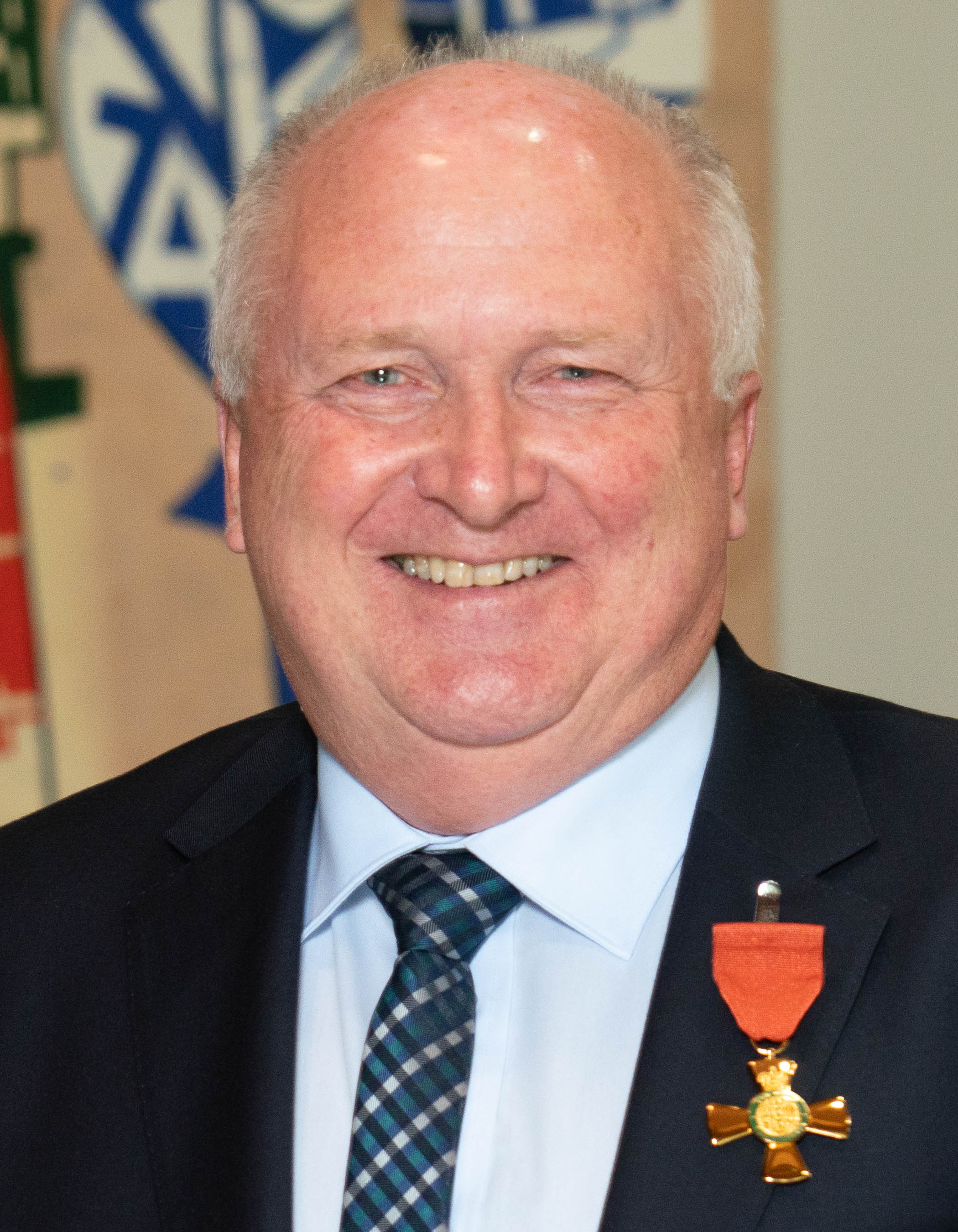
Marston Conder

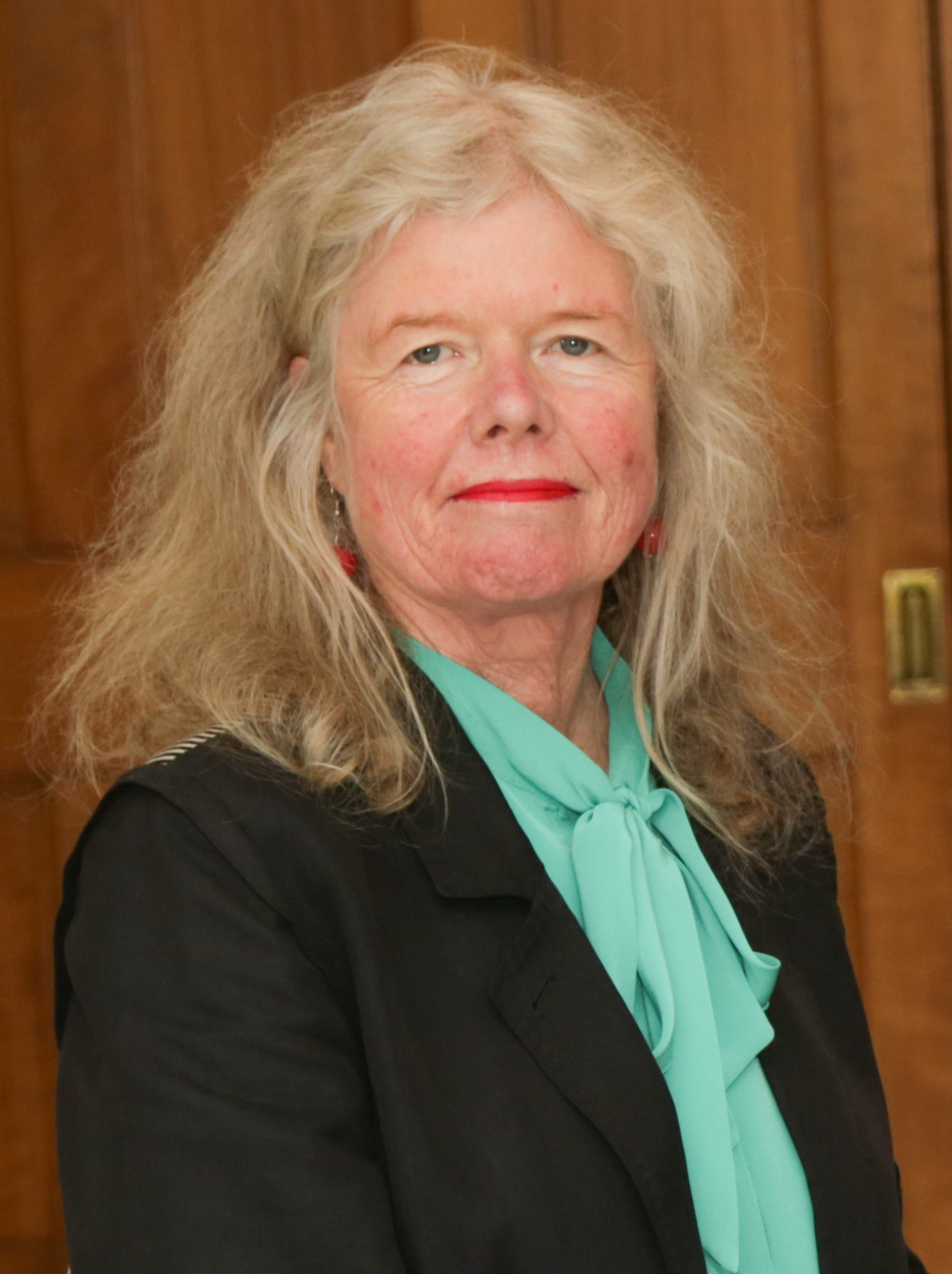
Judy Darragh

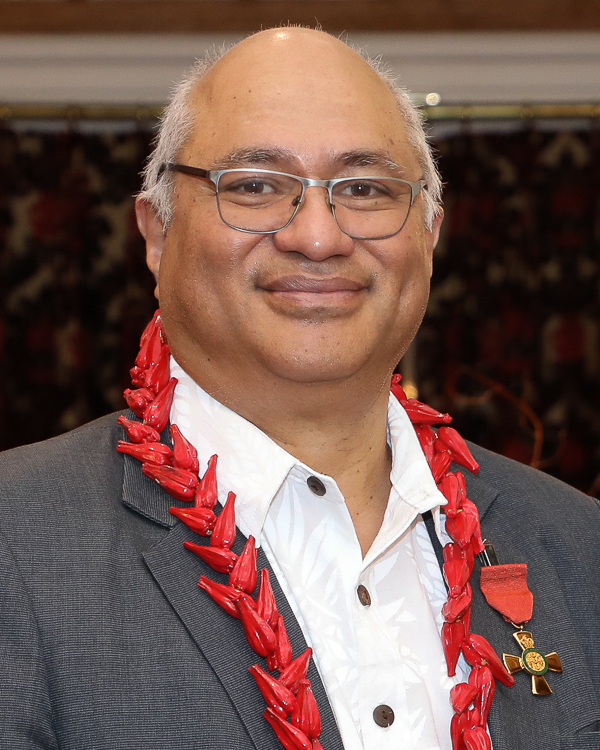
Alec Ekeroma

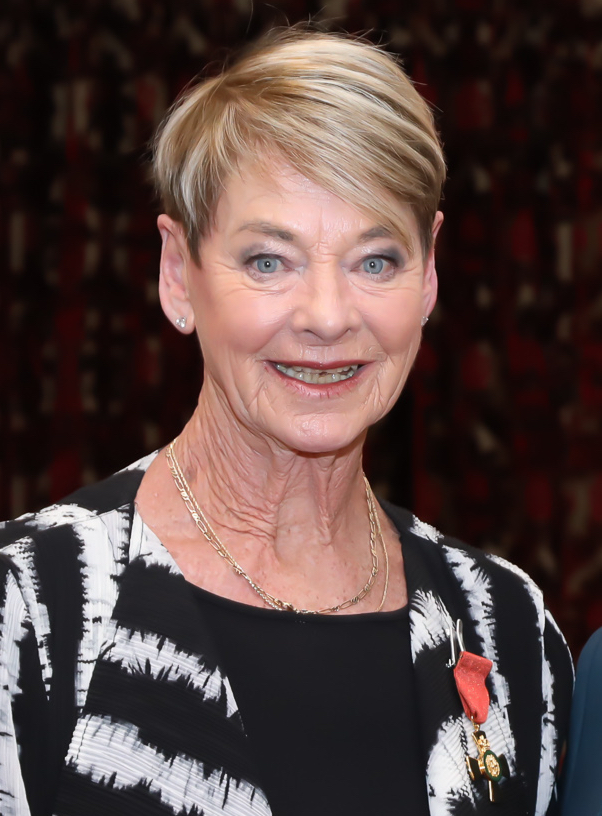
Joan Harnett-Kindley

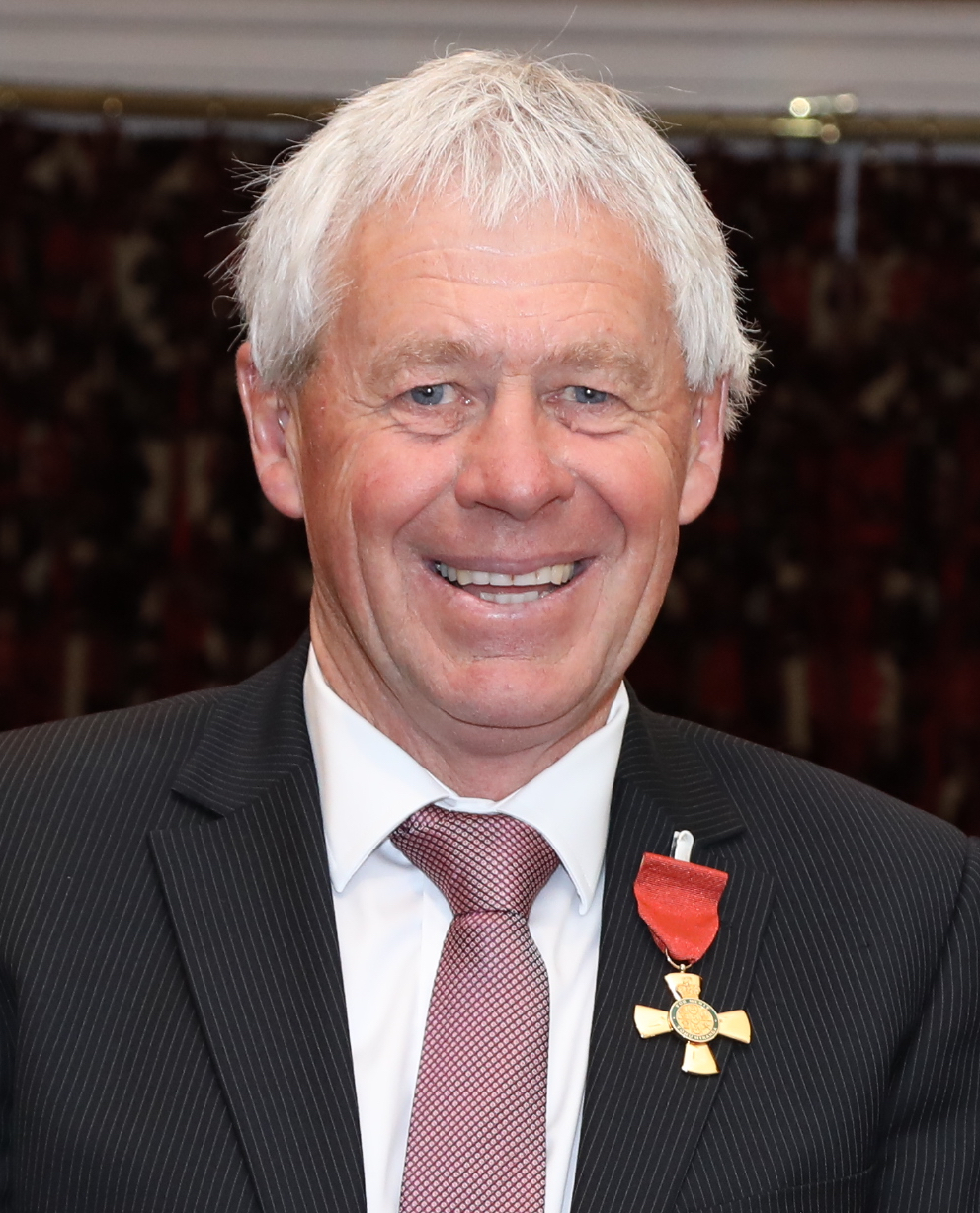
Tony Lepper

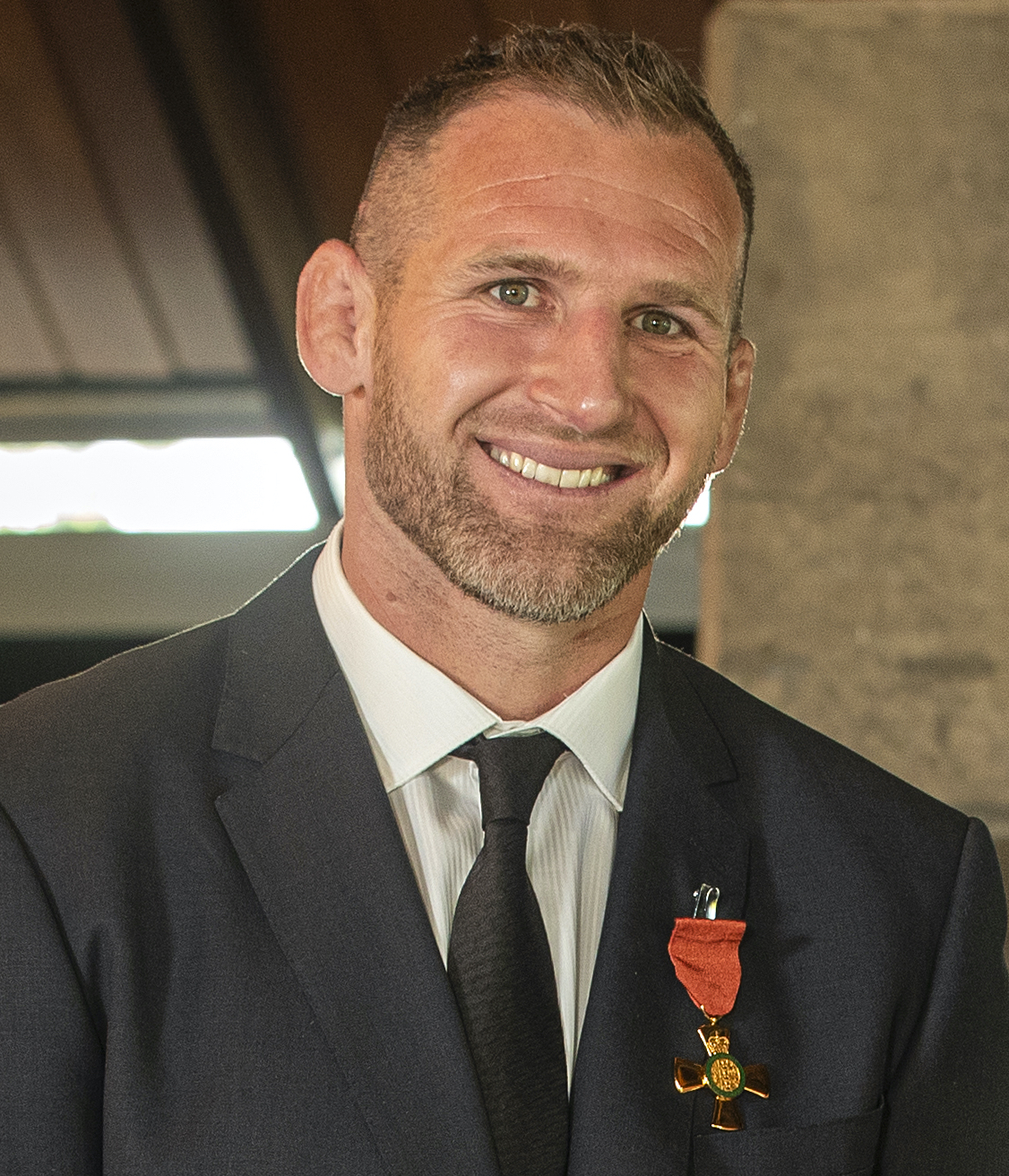
Kieran Read

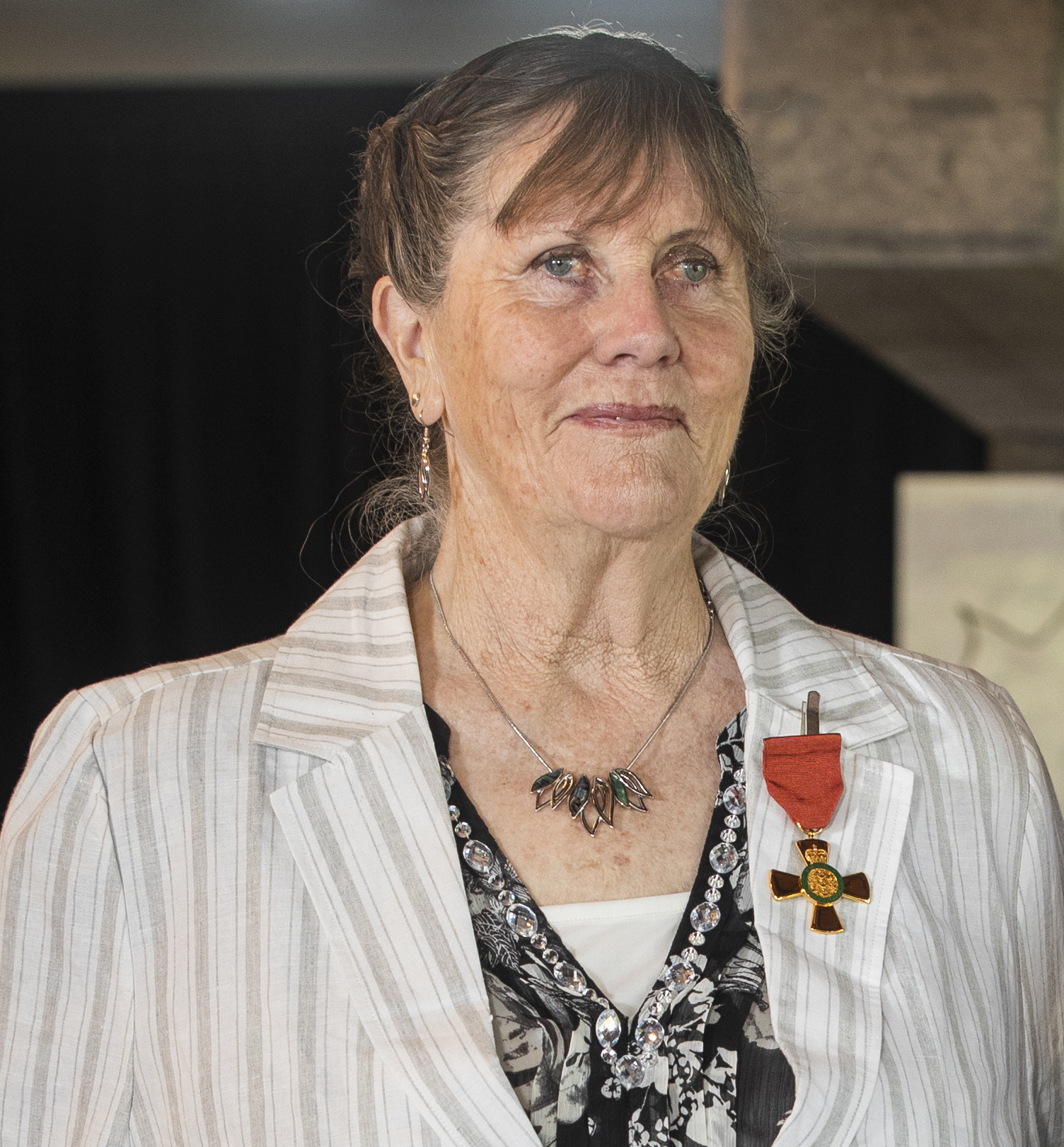
Anne Richardson

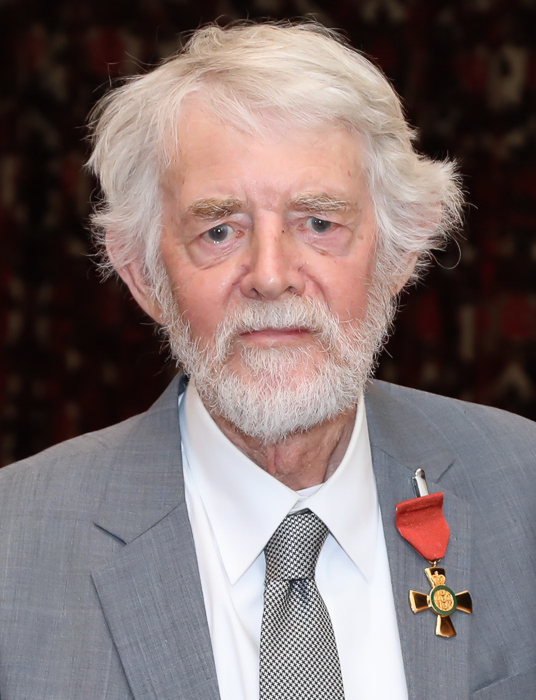
Brian Turner

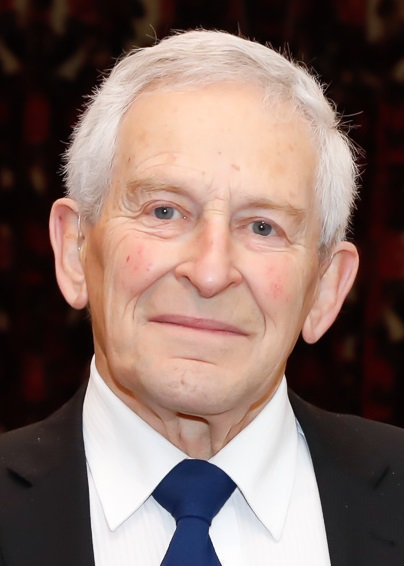
David Zwartz

=== Member (MNZM) ===
- Donna Tusiata Avia – of Aranui. For services to poetry and the arts.
- John Clinton Baddeley – of Raglan. For services to local government and the community.
- Carol Bartle – of Richmond, Christchurch. For services to health, particularly breastfeeding education.
- David Michael Benton – of Bethlehem. For services to addiction support and treatment.
- Georgina Beyer JP – of Kilbirnie. For services to LGBTIQA+ rights.
- Marianne Bishop – of Newlands. For services to the union movement and the community.
- Patricia Gweneith Broad QSM – of Kew, Dunedin. For services to gymnastics.
- John McGregor Buchanan – of Kew, Dunedin. For services to music.
- Russell George Burt – of Point England. For services to primary education.
- Lois Anne Chick – of Shirley. For services to education.
- David Osborne Crerar – of Company Bay. For services to mountaineering and outdoor recreation.
- Joseph John Francis Davis – of Wharekaho, Whitianga. For services to Māori and conservation.
- Pamela Josephine Nicol Dawkins – of Bethlehem. For services to horticulture.
- Murray Ian Dawson – of Sockburn. For services to horticulture.
- Jacqueline Leigh Edmond – of Brooklyn. For services to sexual and reproductive health.
- Iosefa Punefu Enari – of Sandringham. For services to Pacific dance.
- Rhonda Renyl Nga-Tiawa Fraser – of Greytown. For services to women and aviation.
- Emily Sarah Gaddum – of Kereru, Hastings. For services to hockey.
- William Neil Graham – of Naenae. For services to youth and the community.
- David Victor William Harvey – of Burnside. For services to the New Zealand Police and the community.
- Dr Jeremy Paul Hill – of Awapuni. For services to the dairy industry and scientific research.
- Elizabeth Hird – of Ōtaki. For services to health.
- Dr Roberta Kathleen Hunter – of Point Chevalier. For services to mathematics education.
- Graham Peter Jackson – of Frankton. For services to the trades industry and business.
- Sandra Jenkins – of Coopers Beach. For services to education.
- Muriel Naomi TeHuikau Johnstone – of Riverton. For services to Māori and conservation.
- Sharon Anne Kearney – of Akaroa. For services to physiotherapy and netball.
- Dr Alison Margaret Keeling – of Merivale. For services to gerontology.
- Dr Kevin Bartley Knight JP – of Burnside, Christchurch. For services to education.
- Dr Maureen Robin Lander – of Whangamatā. For services to Māori art.
- Dr Sarah Isabella Leberman – of Palmerston North. For services to women, sport and tertiary education.
- Donald Stuart Long – of Days Bay. For services to literature and education, particularly Pacific language education.
- Takapuna Eruete Whaipooti Mackey – of Kaiti. For services to martial arts and Māori.
- Donald John MacLean – of Epsom. For services to education.
- Maureen Naomi McCleary – of Glen Eden. For services to the arts.
- Donald Ellis McKay – of Maungaturoto. For services to seniors and the community.
- Dr Priscilla Muriel McQueen – of Bluff. For services as a poet.
- Dr Beverley Ann Milne – of Weymouth. For services to education.
- Desmond Gerard Minehan – of Cromwell. For services to Fire and Emergency New Zealand.
- Dr Arish Chakarvarthi Naresh JP – of Newtown. For services to the community and dentistry.
- Kiri Marie Nathan – of Mount Wellington. For services to Māori and the fashion industry.
- Tofilau Bernadette Barbara Pereira – of Howick. For services to the Pacific community and women.
- Dr Vincent James Peterson – of Gleniti, Timaru. For services to the veterinary profession.
- Graham Carrick Preston – of Bethlehem. For services to education.
- Peter Te Rangi Hiroa Ramsden – of Spreydon. For services to conservation.
- Aseta Redican – of Remuera. For services to health and Pacific peoples.
- William John Rickerby – of Richmond, Nelson. For services to conservation.
- Richard Steward Rudd – of Whanganui. For services to ceramic art.
- Noel John Henry Sheat – of Palmerston. For services to ploughing and the community.
- Susan Mary Sherrard – of Blockhouse Bay. For services to people with disabilities.
- Peter Edward Smale – of Motueka. For services to seniors, the community and horticulture.
- Dianne Judith Smeehuyzen JP – of Ravensbourne. For services to brass bands.
- Ramari Evelyn Sidonie Oliphant Stewart – of Ōkārito. For services to Māori culture, wildlife conservation and research.
- Lynette Harata Te Aika – of Wigram. For services to Māori language education.
- Christopher Te'o – of Whitby. For services to health, cycling and the Pacific community.
- Mary Helen Thompson – of Sunnybrook, Rotorua. For services to netball administration.
- Ngareta Timutimu – of Tauranga. For services to Māori and education.
- Dr Janet Catherine Turnbull – of Tītahi Bay. For services to health.
- Robert Lindsay Webb QSM – of Glenbervie. For services to wildlife conservation.
- Kayla Marie Whitelock – of Palmerston North. For services to hockey.
- Joan Glanville Whittaker – of Greenlane. For services to heritage preservation and music education.
- Lloyd Murray Whittaker – of Greenlane. For services to heritage preservation and music education.
- Maria Ruth McGredy Winder – of Remuera. For services to music education.
- Maureen Dawn Wood – of Kelston. For services to people with disabilities.

Honorary

- Angelica Johanna Maria Edgley – of Wellington. For services to forensic science.
- Lita Foliaki – of Greenlane. For services to the Pacific community.
- Dr Johan Hellemans – of Clifton. For services to triathlon.
- Elizabeth Herrmann – of Howick. For services to the hospitality industry and philanthropy. (Note: Reclassified as an Additional Member of the New Zealand Order of Merit, 10 June 2025.)
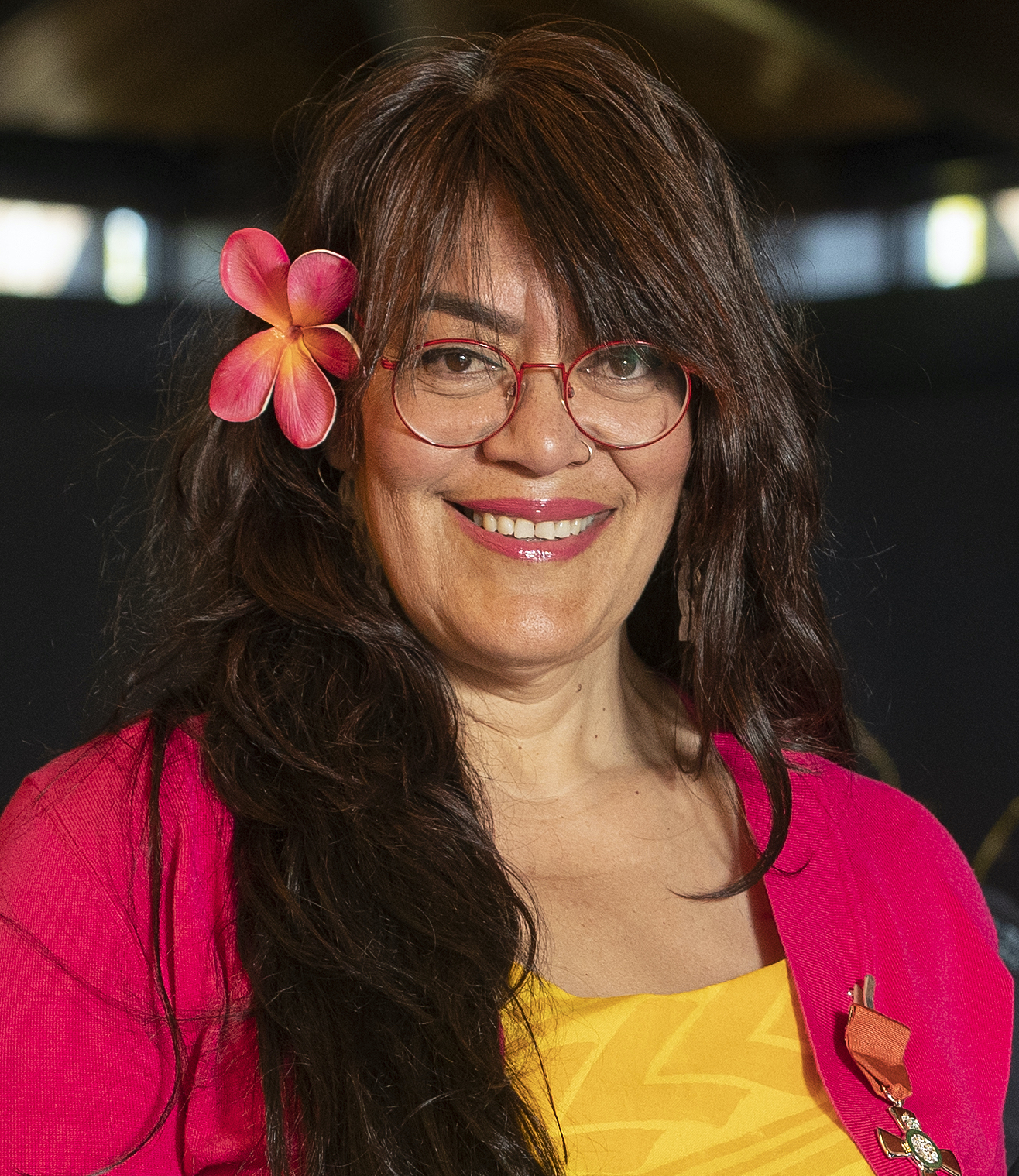
Tusiata Avia

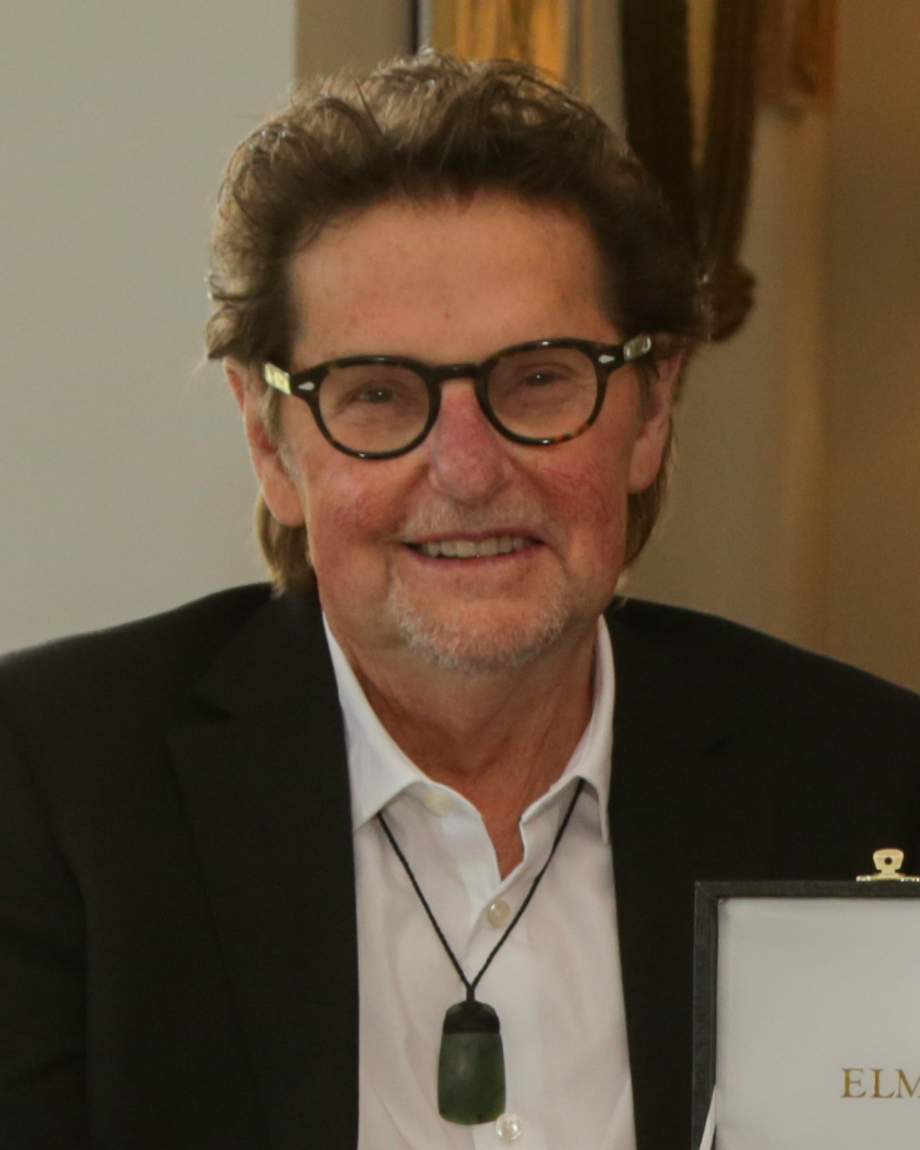
Clint Baddeley

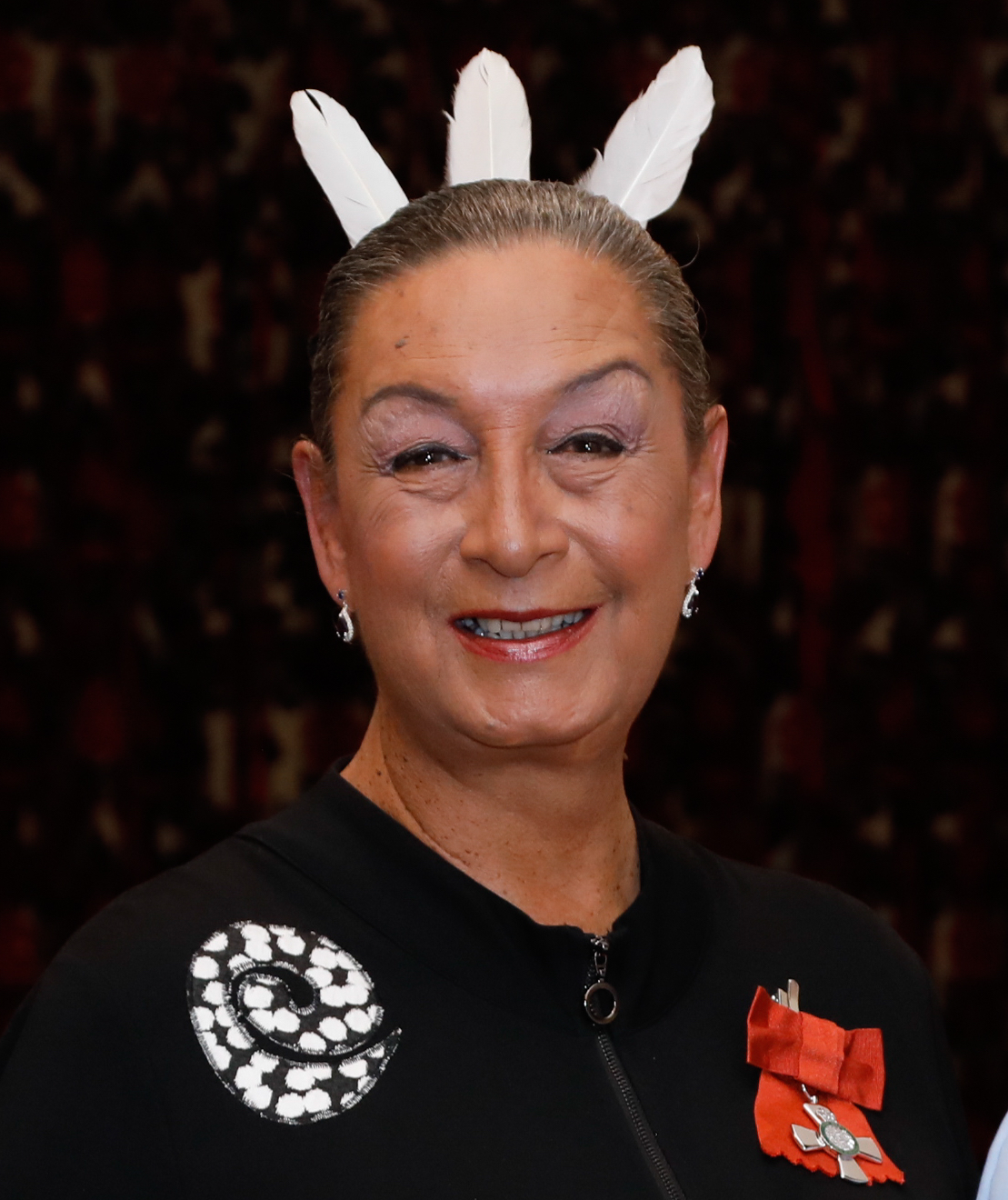
Georgina Beyer

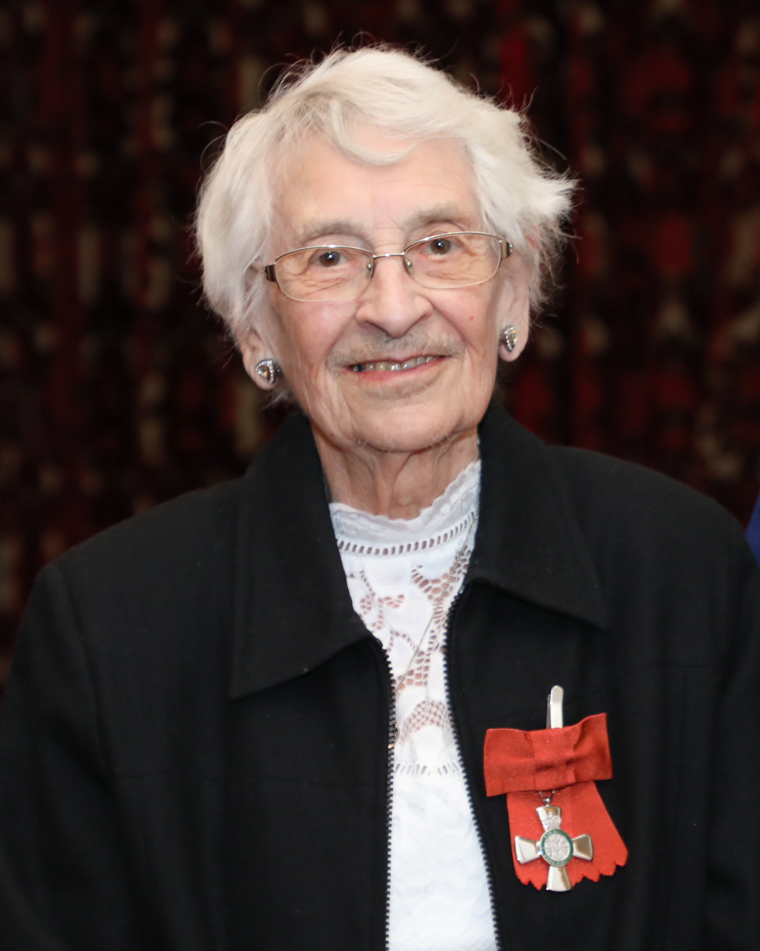
Patricia Broad

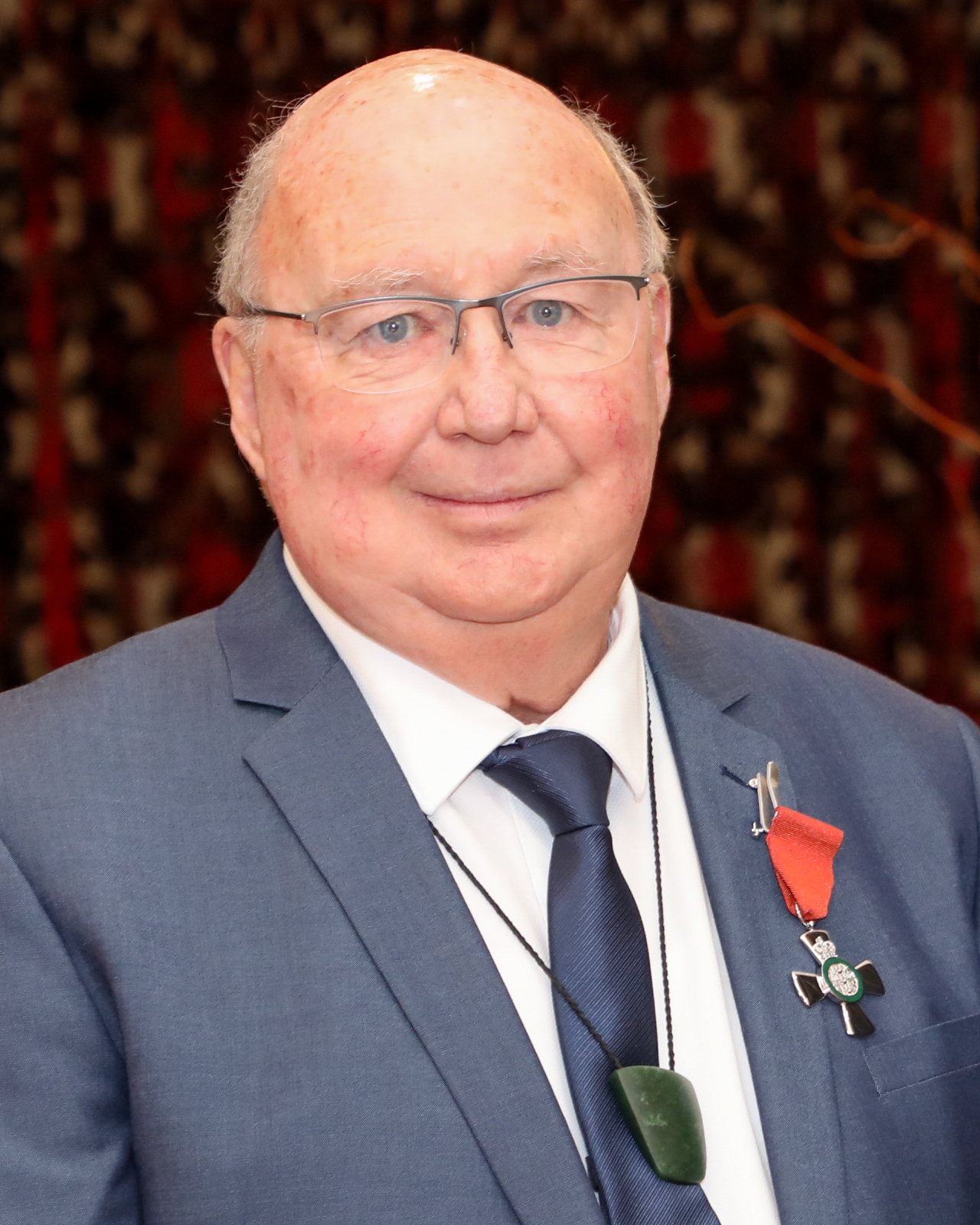
John Buchanan

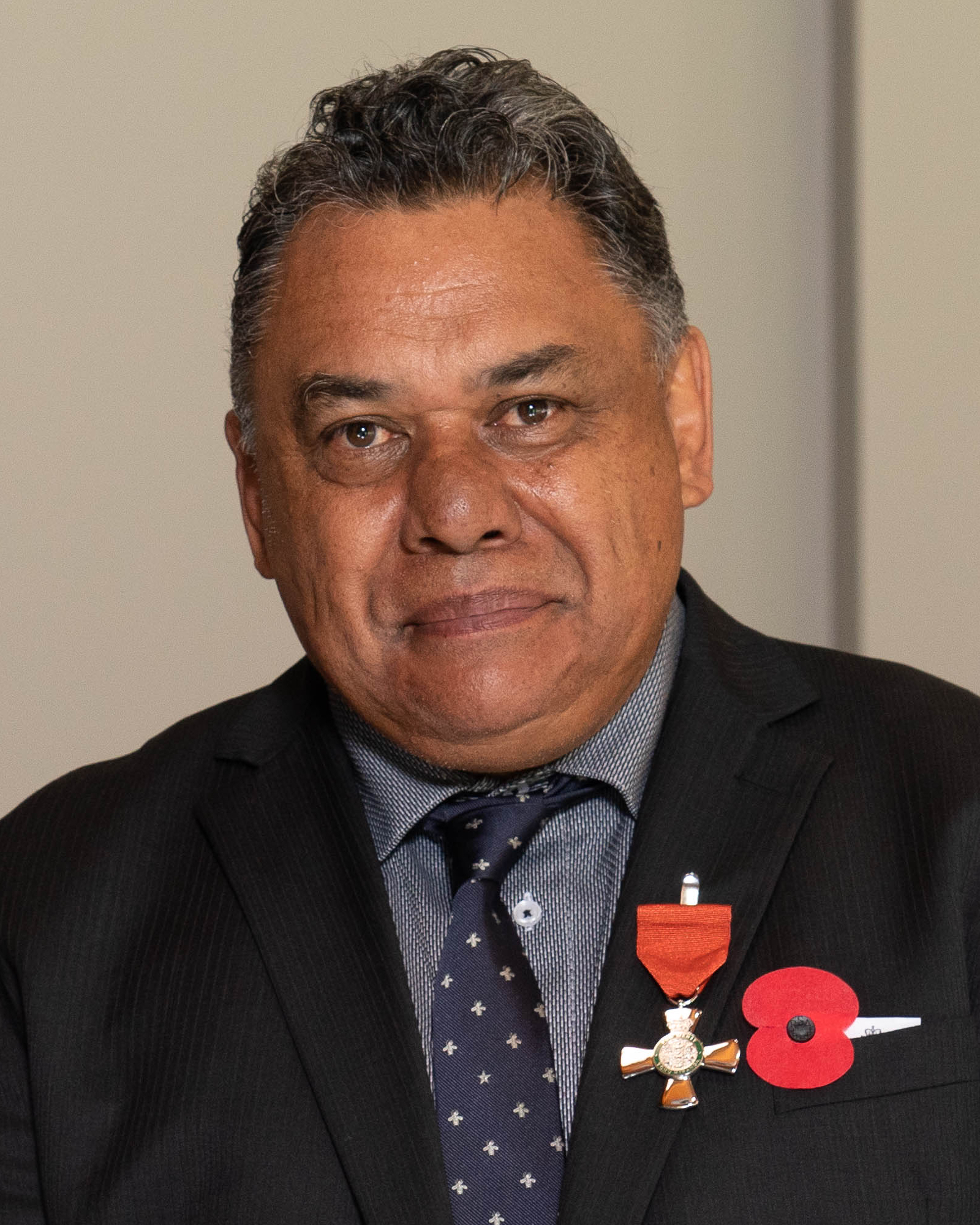
Joe Davis

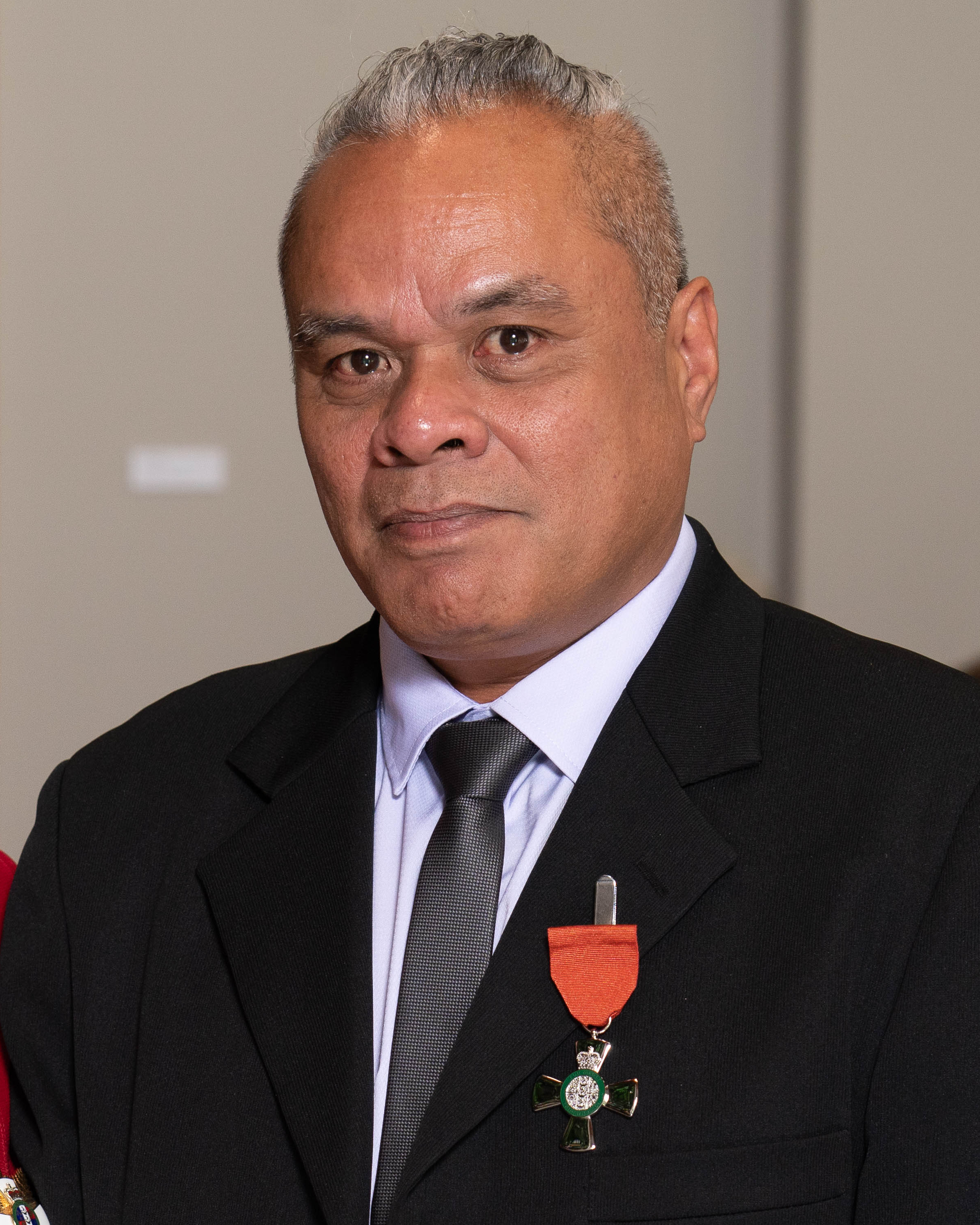
Sefa Enari

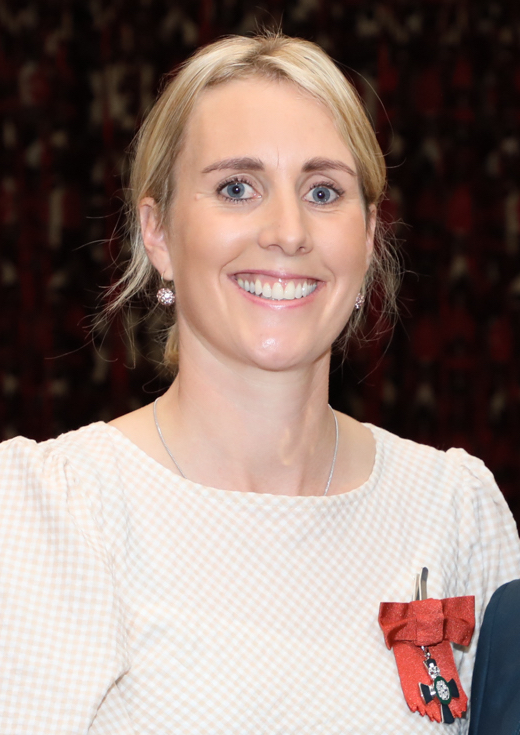
Emily Gaddum

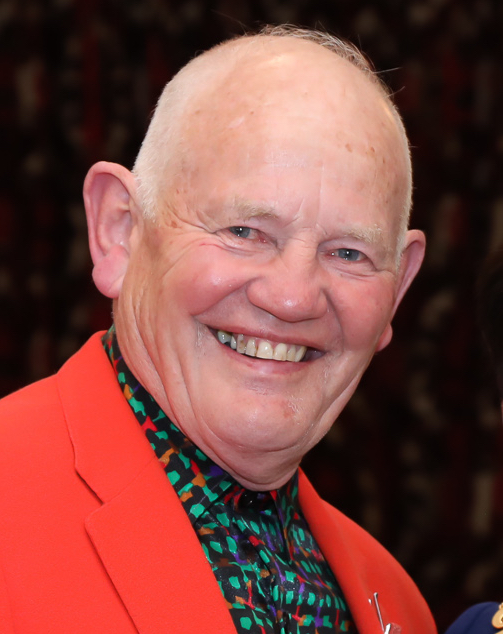
Billy Graham

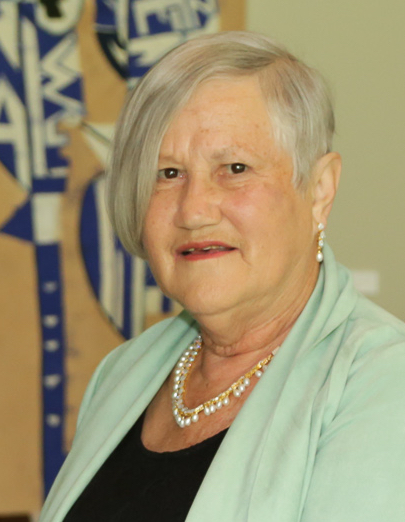
Bobbie Hunter

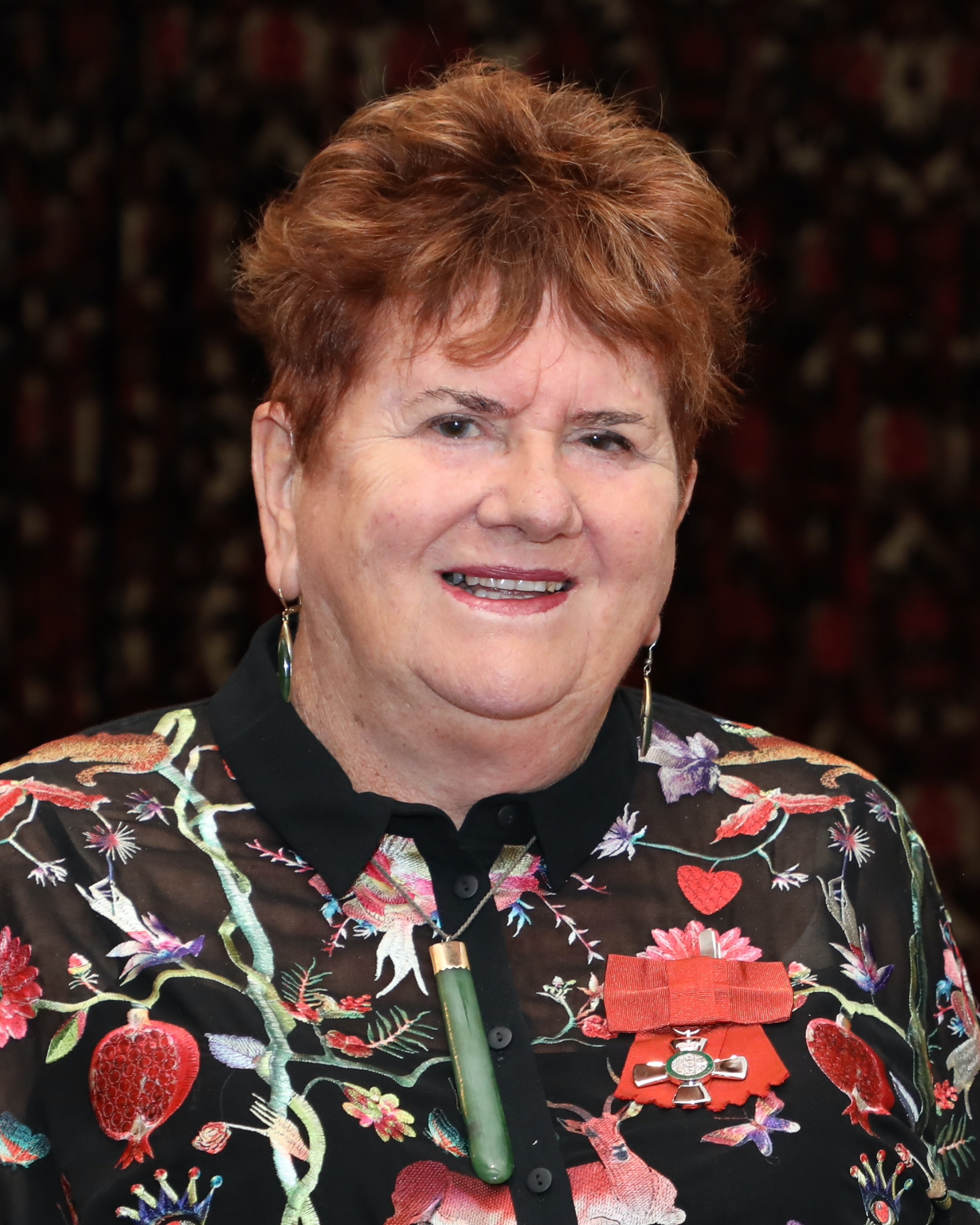
Sandra Jenkins

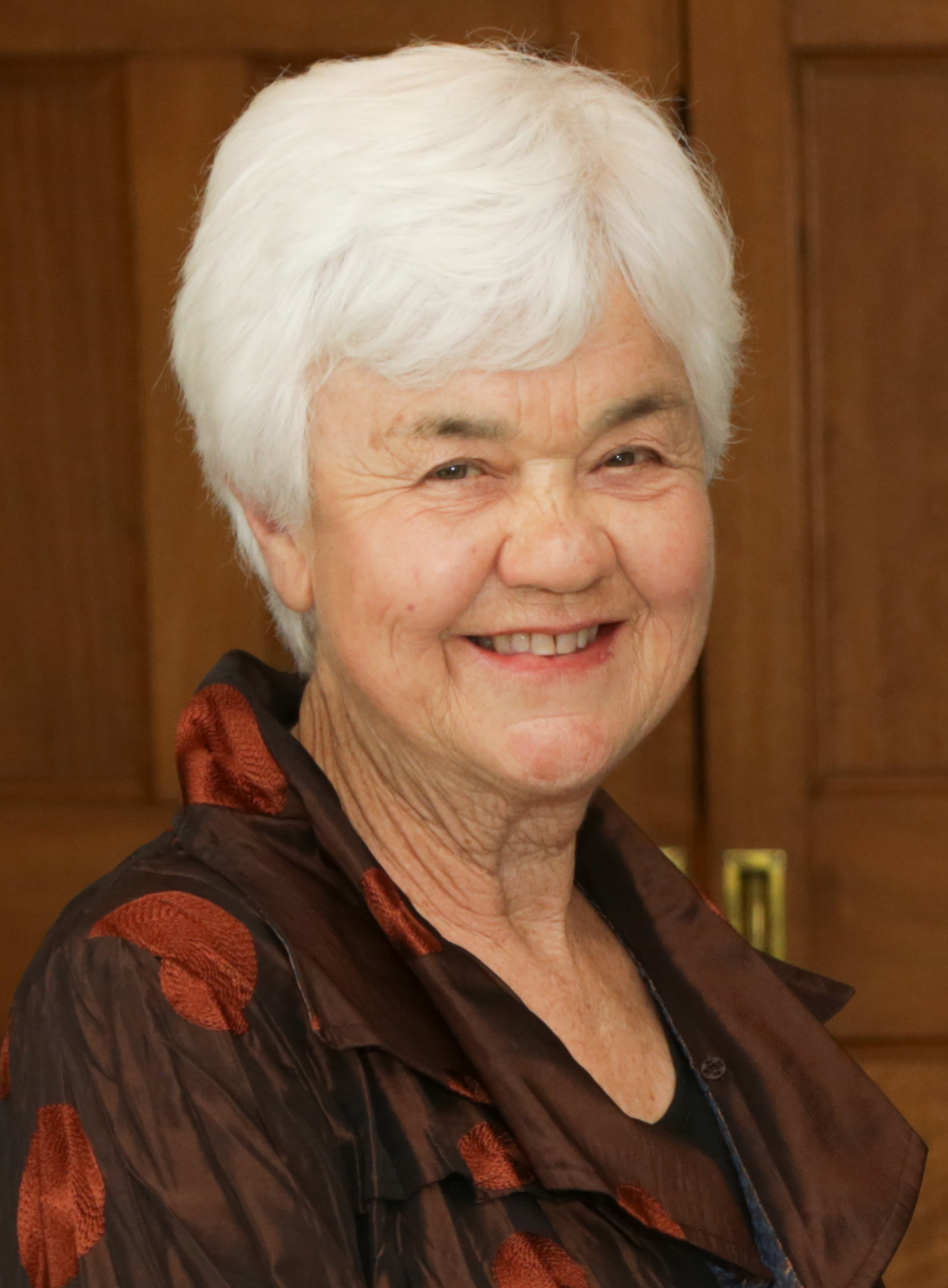
Maureen Lander

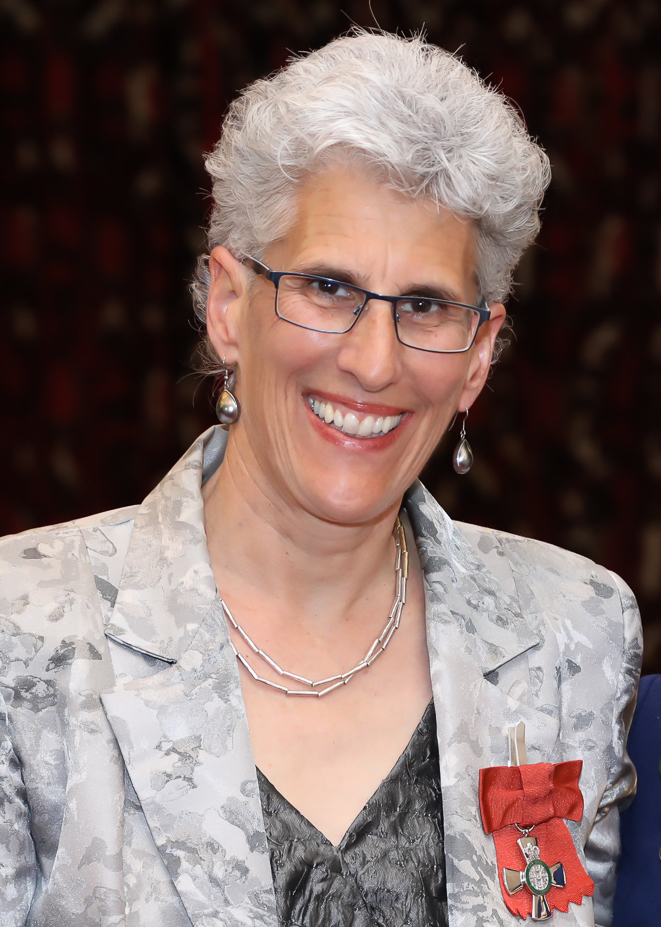
Sarah Leberman

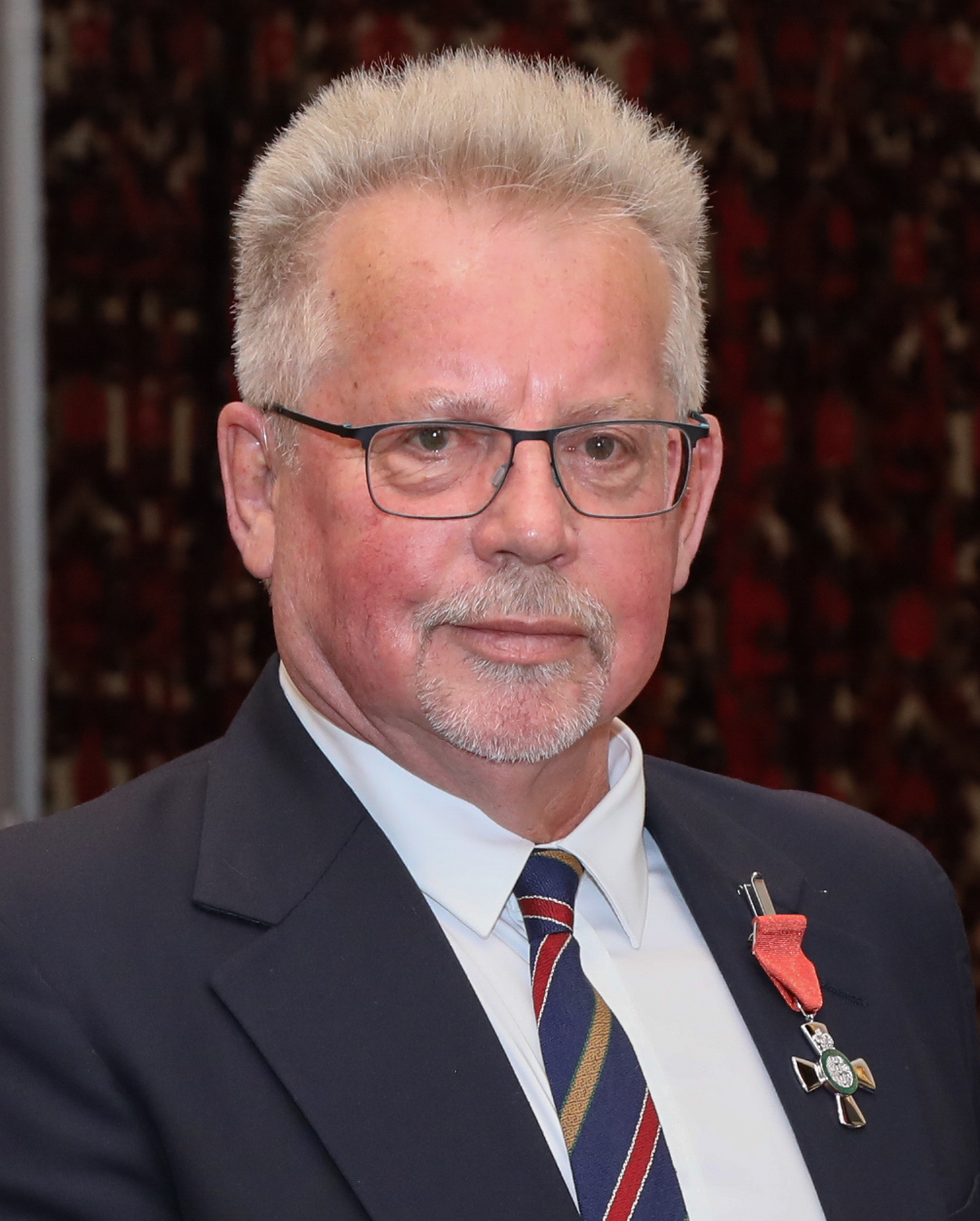
Don Long

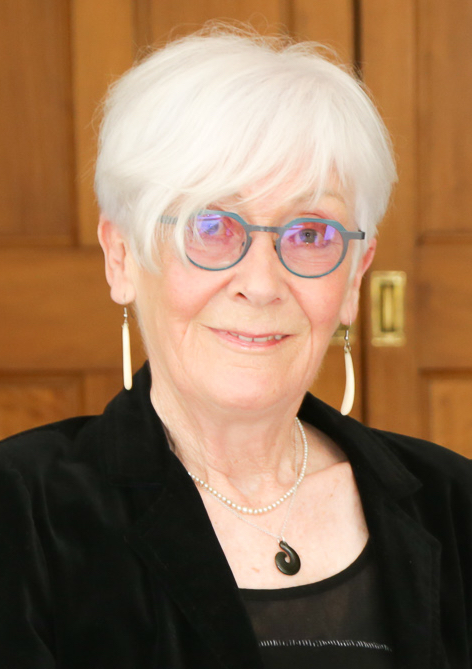
Cilla McQueen

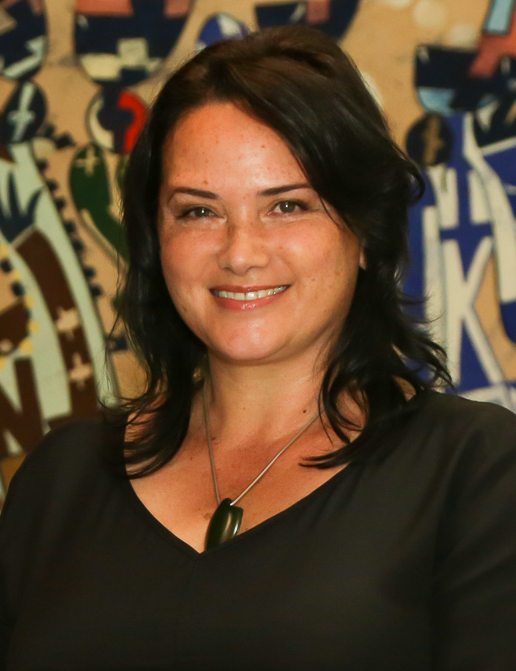
Kiri Nathan

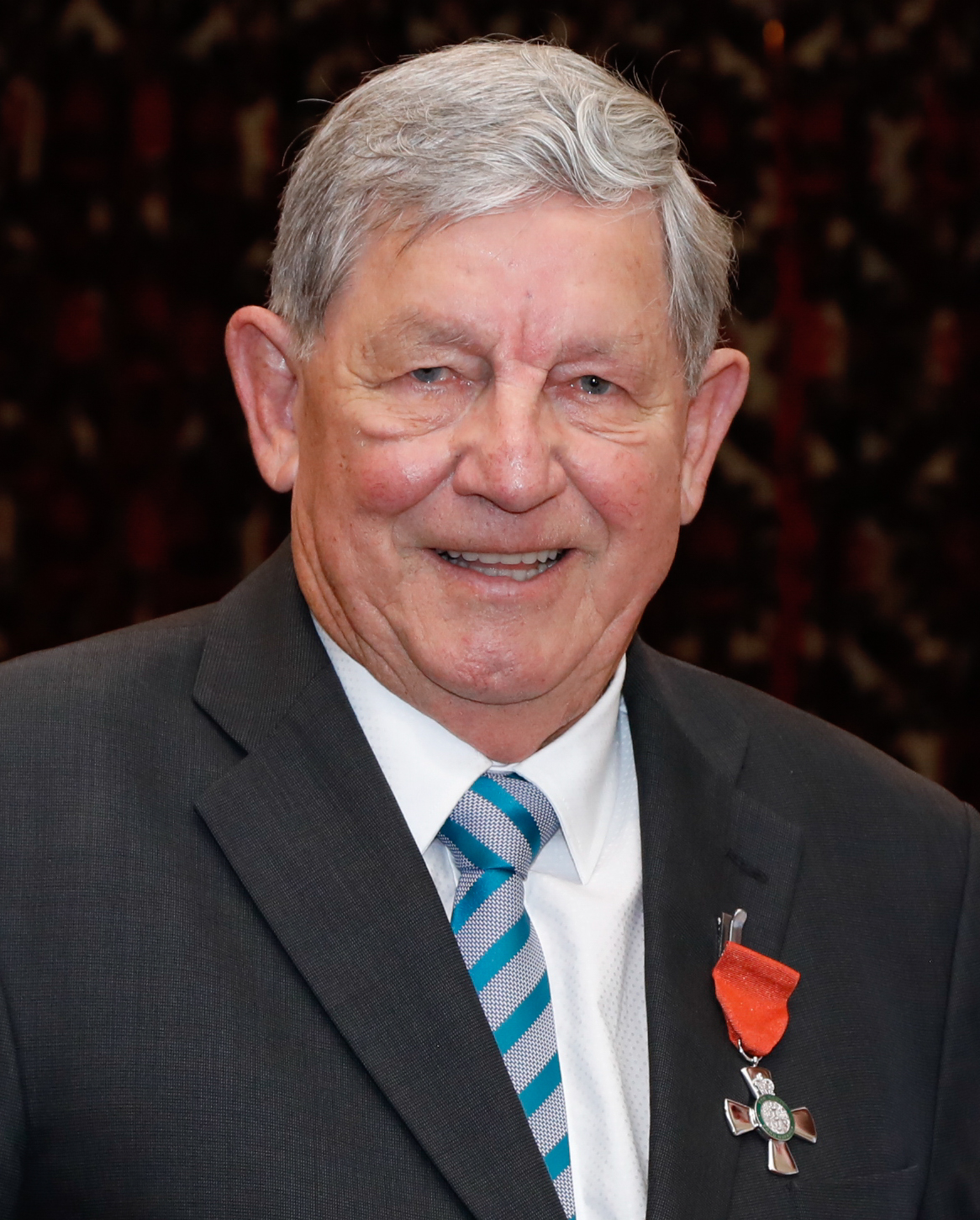
Vince Peterson

Aseta Redican

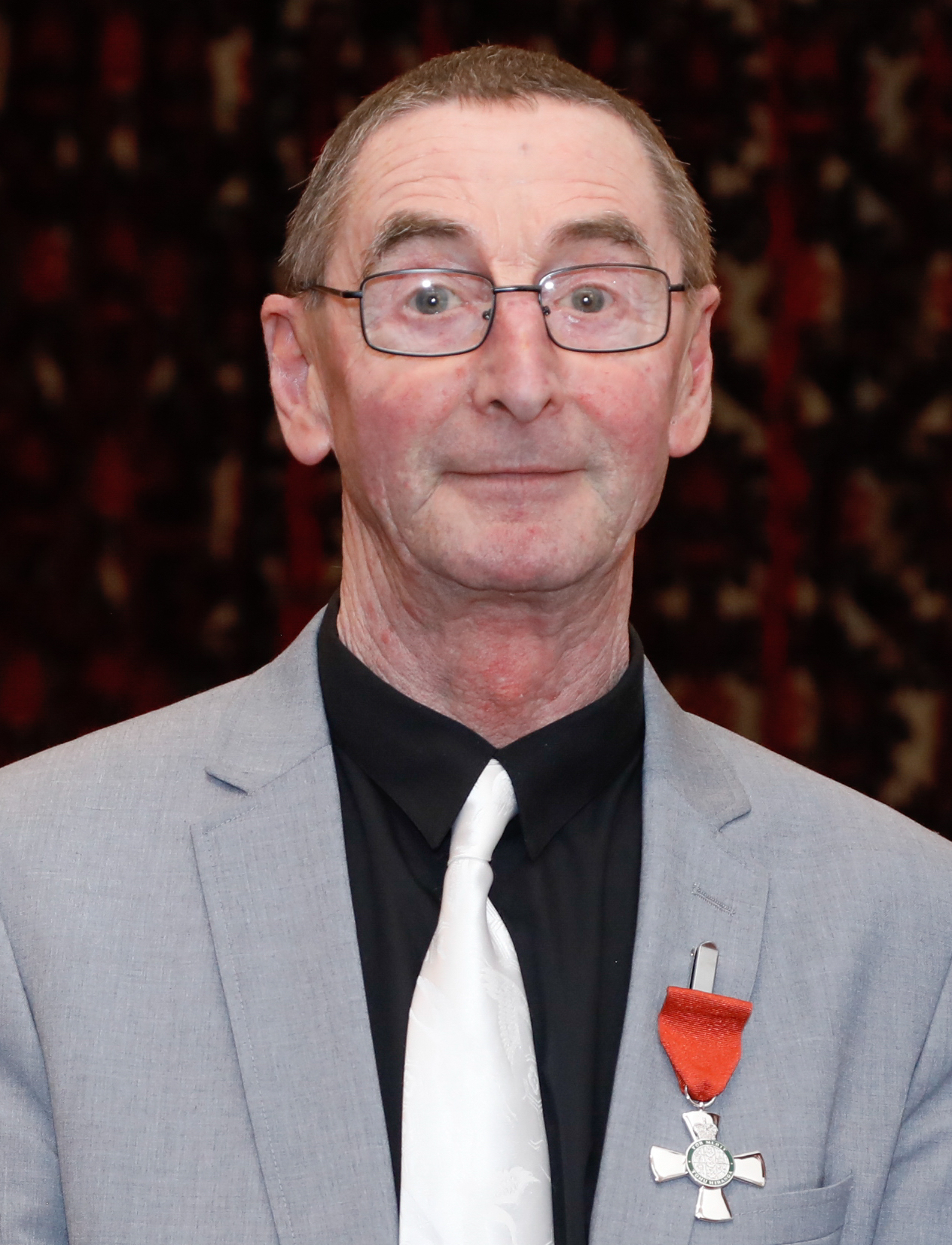
Rick Rudd

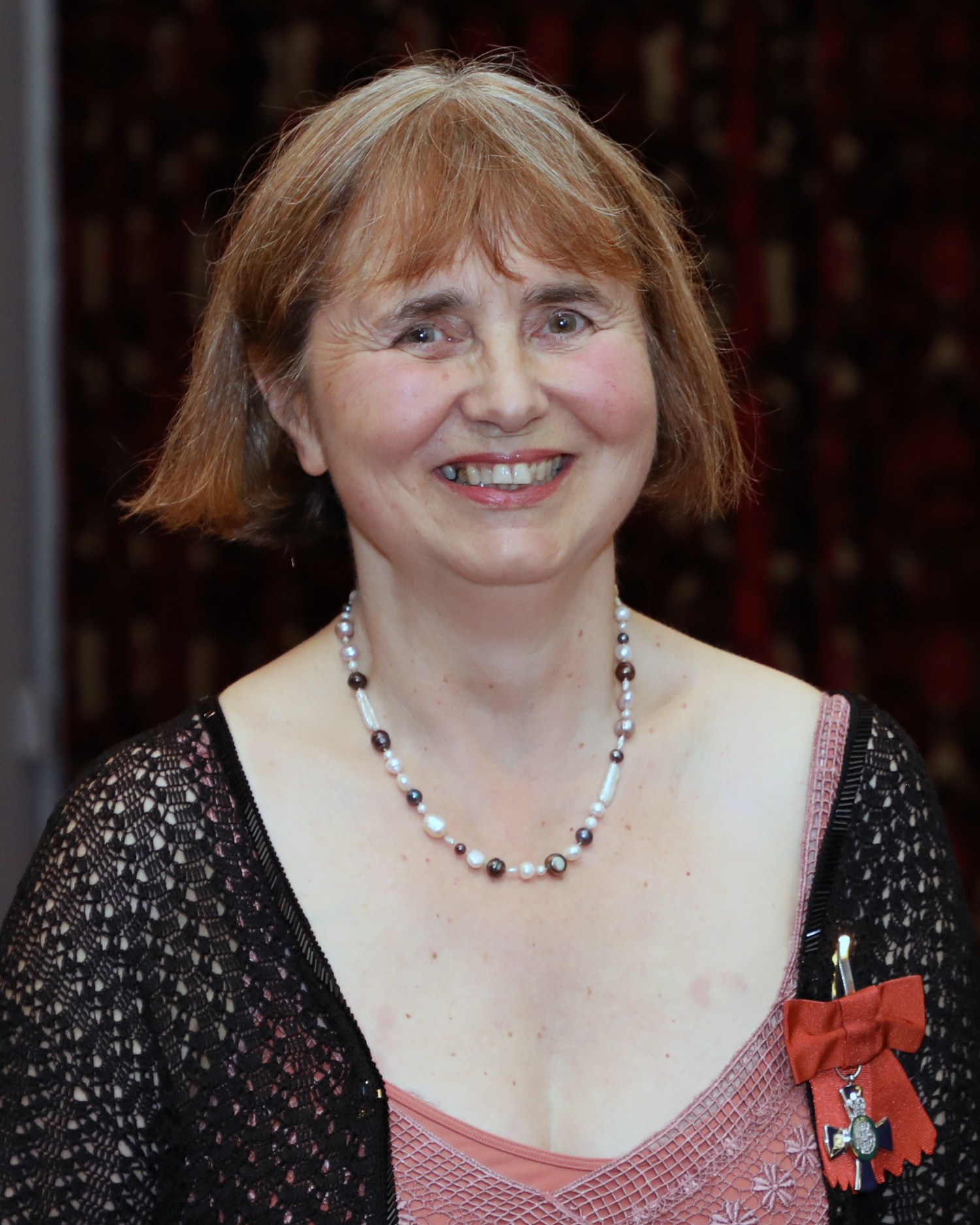
Dianne Smeehuyzen

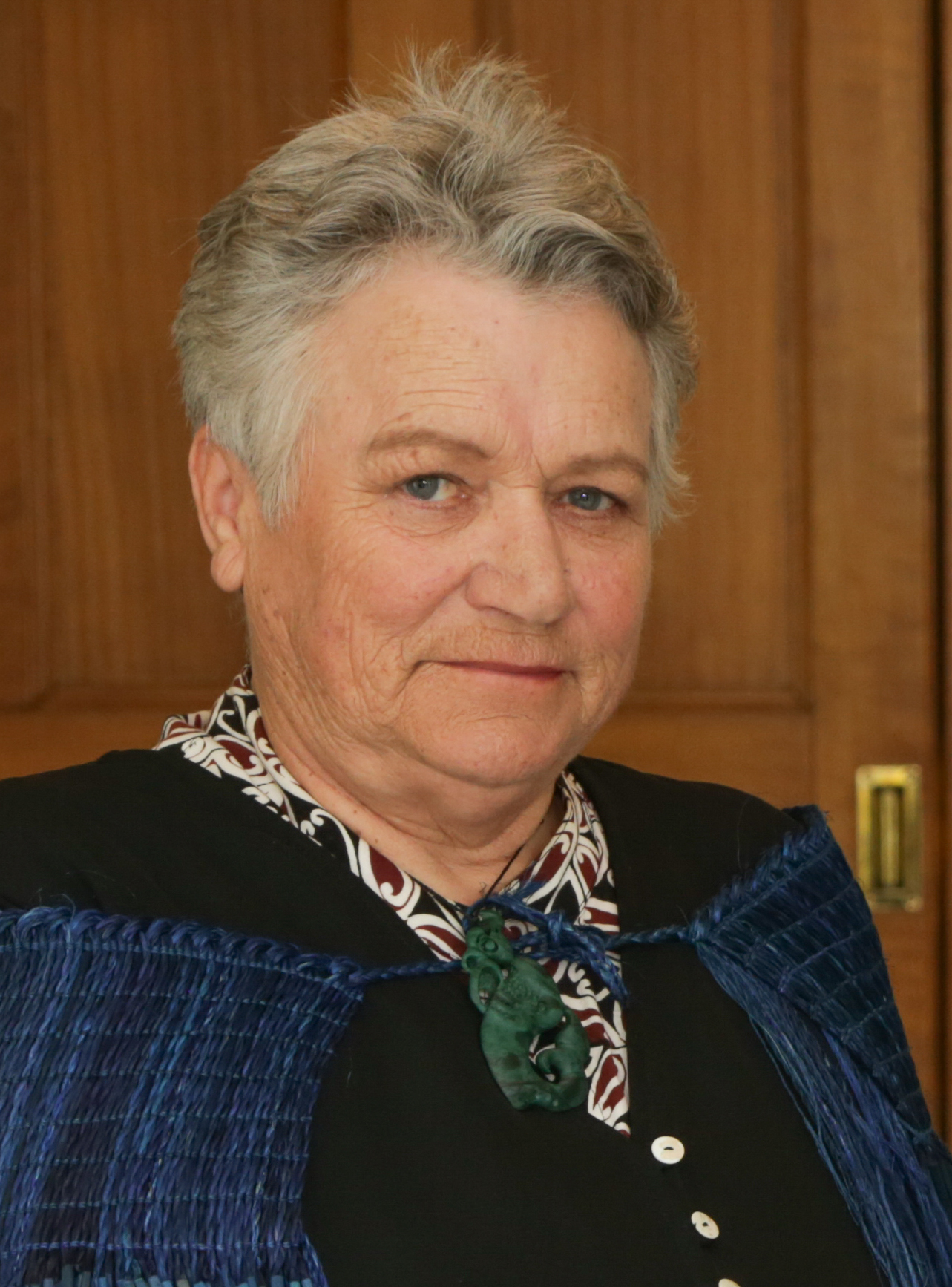
Ramari Stewart

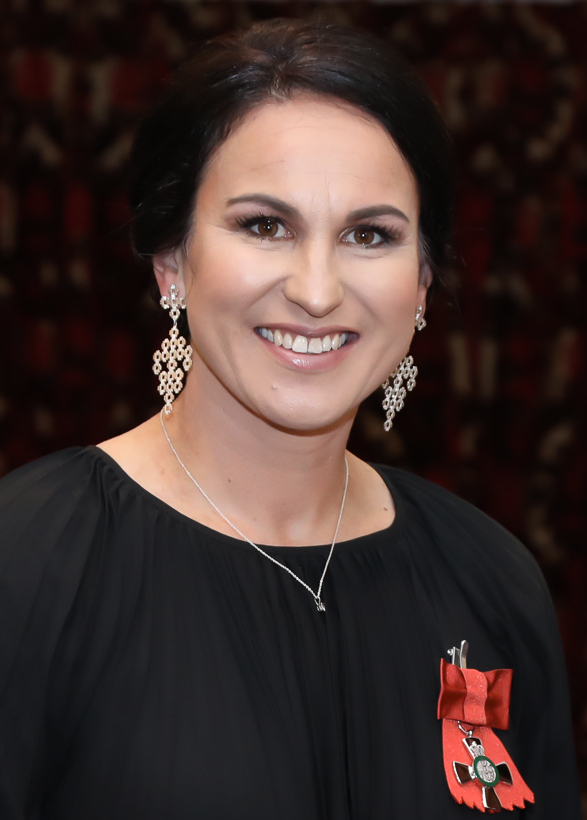
Kayla Whitelock

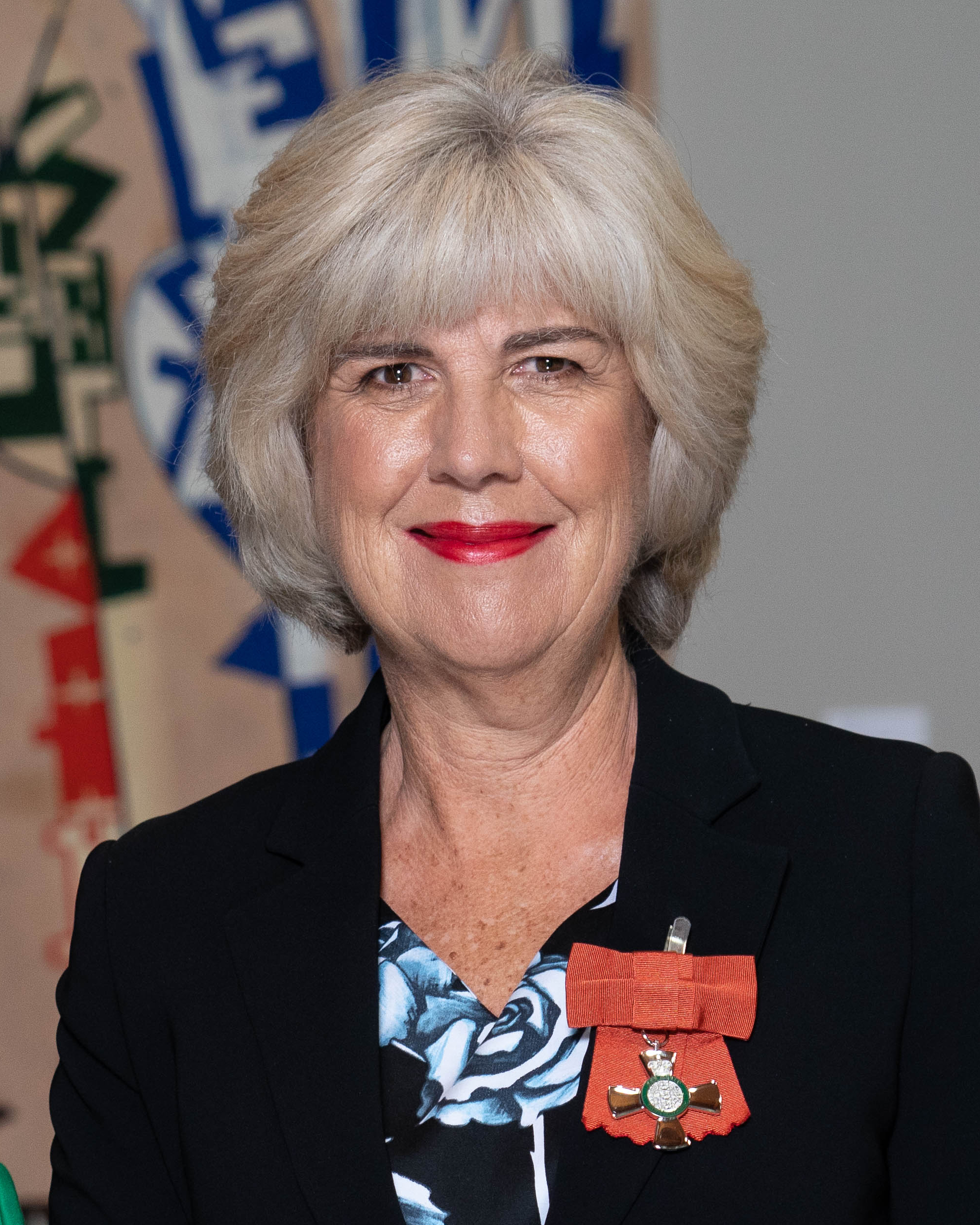
Maria Winder

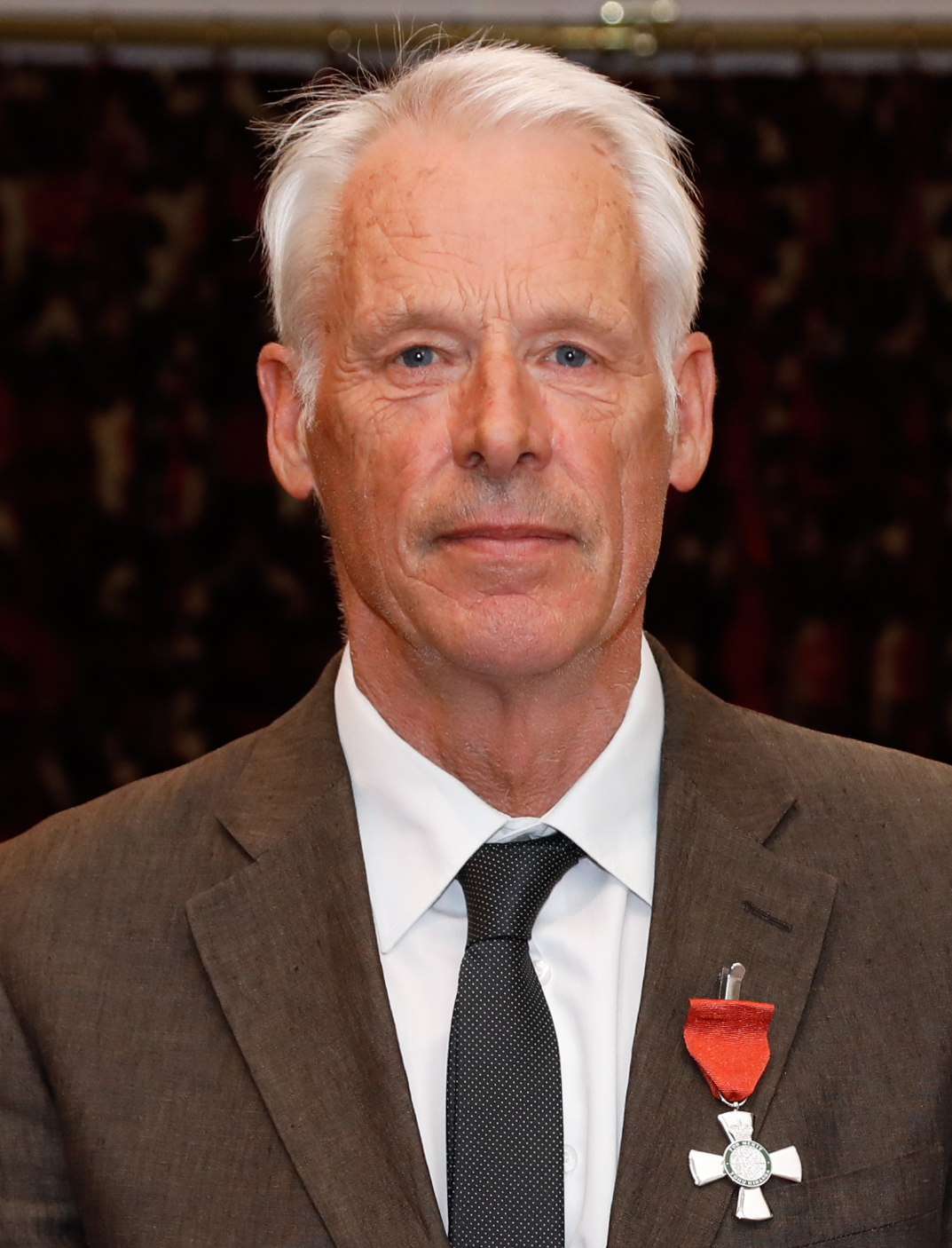
John Hellemans

== Companion of the Queen's Service Order (QSO) ==
- Clare Elizabeth Wells – of Waipu. For services to early childhood education.
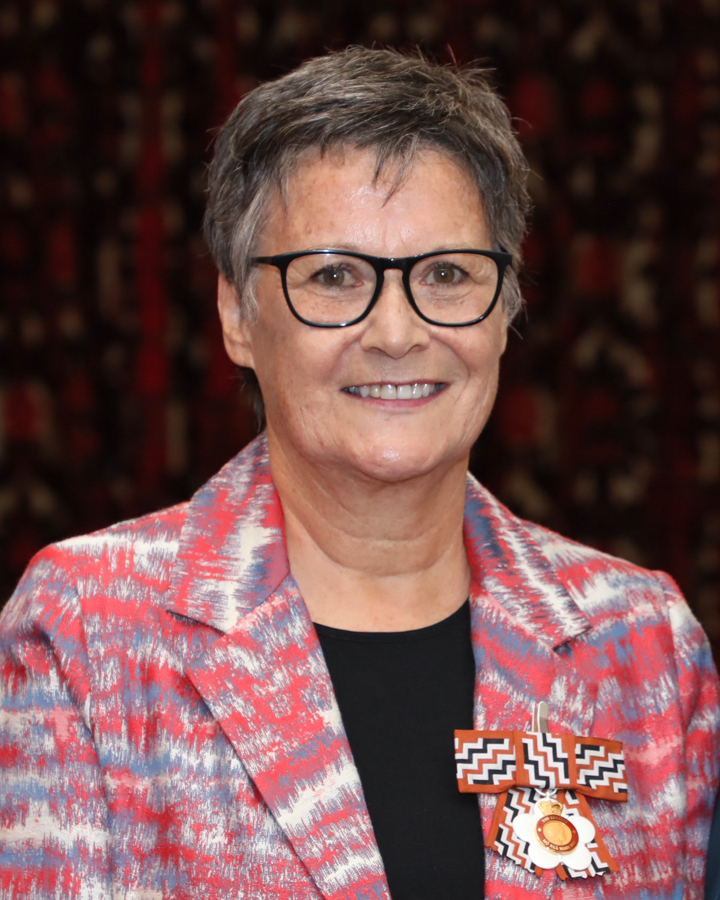
Clare Wells

== Queen's Service Medal (QSM) ==
- Agnes Miller Anderson – of Papanui. For services to choral music.
- Edith Hazel Barnes JP – of Kihikihi. For services to local government and the community.
- Rhys Bean – of Papatoetoe. For services to the community.
- Gillian Clare Bishop – of Richmond, Nelson. For services to conservation.
- Robyn Mary Bisset – of Avonhead. For services to the community.
- Bevan Albert Bradding – of Rototuna. For services to the community.
- Margaret Mary Bradding – of Rototuna. For services to the community.
- Kay Michelle Brereton – of Six Mile, Murchison. For services to the welfare of beneficiaries.
- Dr David Jeffrey Butler – of The Brook, Nelson. For services to conservation.
- Allan John Cox – of Blackball. For services to the community.
- Chandu Daji JP – of Mount Roskill. For services to the Indian community and sport.
- Priscilla Maree Dawson – of Clevedon. For services to refugees and the Burmese community.
- Dawn Zeala Elliott – of Paeroa. For services to art education.
- Ian Harold Foster – of Papatoetoe. For services to the community.
- Audrey Coreen Gray – of Mount Maunganui. For services to choral music.
- Ella Regina Hanify (Ella Buchanan Hanify) – of Normandale. For services to music.
- Eileen Margaret Holt – of Strandon, New Plymouth. For services to stroke victims and the community.
- Donna Marie Kennedy – of Northland. For services to people with disabilities.
- John Charles Kennedy-Good – of Oriental Bay. For services to the community.
- Pravin Kumar JP – of Te Atatū South. For services to the Indian community.
- Ronald John David Lamont – of Wānaka. For services to aviation.
- Emelita Rosita Selena Simeaanamulu Luisi – of Ranui, Auckland. For services to youth.
- Christopher John Marshall – of Kaiapoi. For services to music.
- Gayle Patricia June Marshall – of Glen Eden. For services to the community.
- Ewan Cameron Mason – of Ranfurly. For services to Fire and Emergency New Zealand and the community.
- Neil Malcolm McCorkindale JP – of Eastern Beach. For services to hockey administration.
- Morris Samuel McFall – of Mount Maunganui. For services to the community and philanthropy.
- Trevor John McGlinchey – of Hillsborough, Christchurch. For services to Māori and the community.
- Robert Edward McGowan JP – of Tauranga. For services to Māori and conservation.
- Olga Patrina McKerras – of Springvale. For services to the community.
- Suresh Chunilal Patel JP – of Dannevirke. For services to the community and sport.
- Molima Molly Pihigia – of Ōtara. For services to Niuean art and the community.
- Afamasaga Agnes Rasmussen – of Favona. For services to education and the Pacific community.
- Roy Reid – of Tākaka. For services to seniors.
- Melva Joy Robb – of Blenheim. For services to rural communities and women.
- Ian Arthur Robinson JP – of Waihi Beach. For services to surf lifesaving and the community.
- Terence John Roche – of Tawa. For services to the community.
- Richard Alexander Scadden – of Granity. For services to the community.
- Afiff Shah JP – of Takanini. For services to the Muslim community and football.
- William Mitchell Sharp – of Wainuiomata. For services to youth.
- Maher Angez Singh – of Mount Roskill. For services to seniors and the community.
- Barry John Smith – of Birkenhead. For services to football and historical research.
- Lynn Patricia Smith (Lynn Gilbert-Smith) – of Upper Vogeltown, New Plymouth. For services to dance education.
- Marie Jane Taylor – of Bluff Hill, Napier. For services to horticulture and native revegetation.
- Neil Alexander Taylor – of Hāwera. For services to people with intellectual disabilities and the community.
- Thomas James Thomas – of Witherlea. For services to victim support and the community.
- Stuart John Lewis Thorne – of Albert Town. For services to conservation and search and rescue.
- Myra Jill Tohill – of Alexandra. For services to the community.
- Ian Norman Walker – of Kaikōura. For services to Fire and Emergency New Zealand.
- Malcolm Alan Walker – of Winton. For services to sport and education.
- Margaret Mary Western – of Redwoodtown. For services to migrant and refugee communities.
- Alexa Learmonth Whaley – of Ōmāpere. For services to historical research and heritage preservation.
- Roger Lewis Williams – of Warkworth. For services to conservation.
- Gareth David Winter – of Kuripuni. For services to historical research.
- Gwenyth Mary Wright – of Thames. For services to women and the community.
- Diane Stretton Yalden – of Tāneatua. For services to the community.
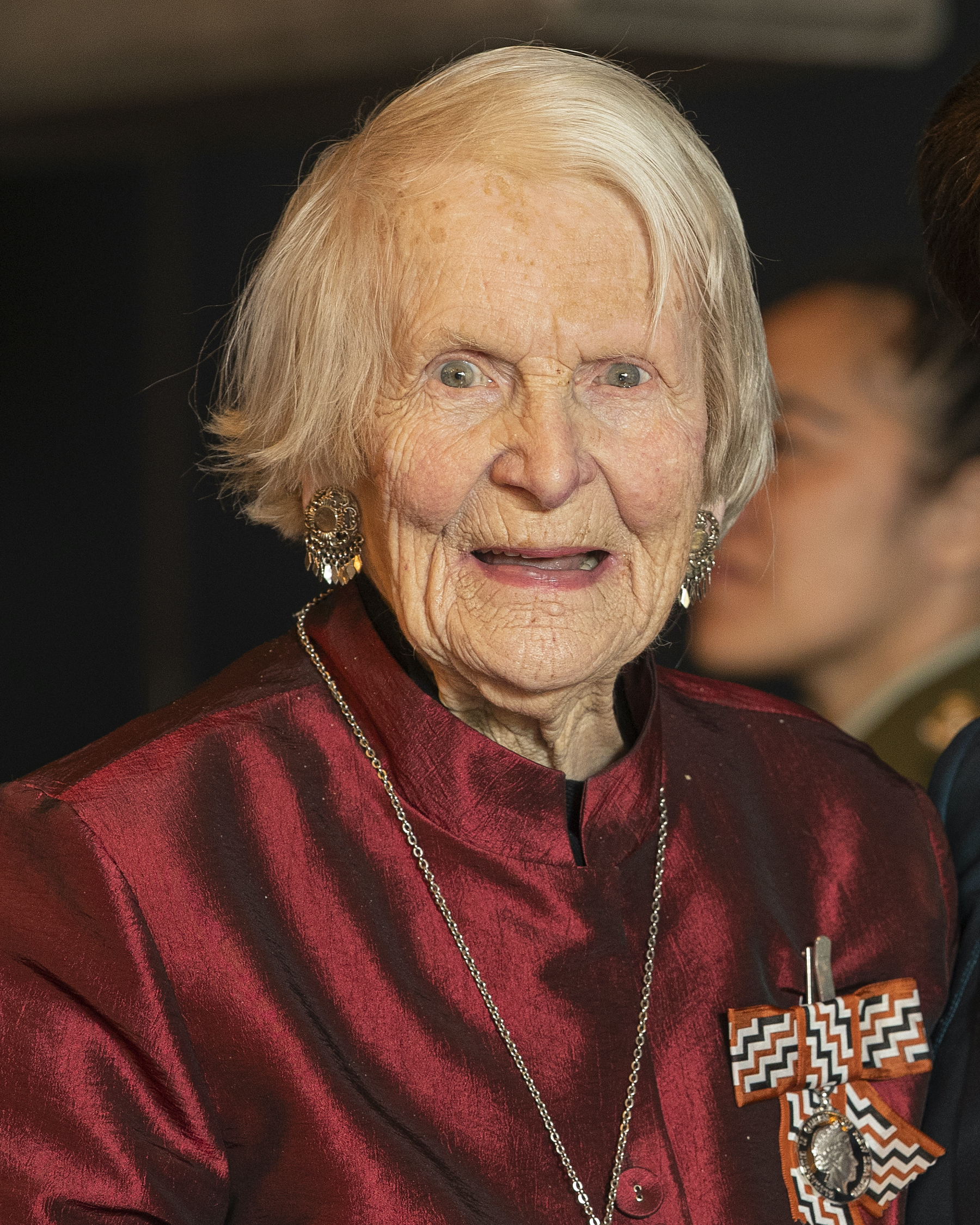
Nan Anderson

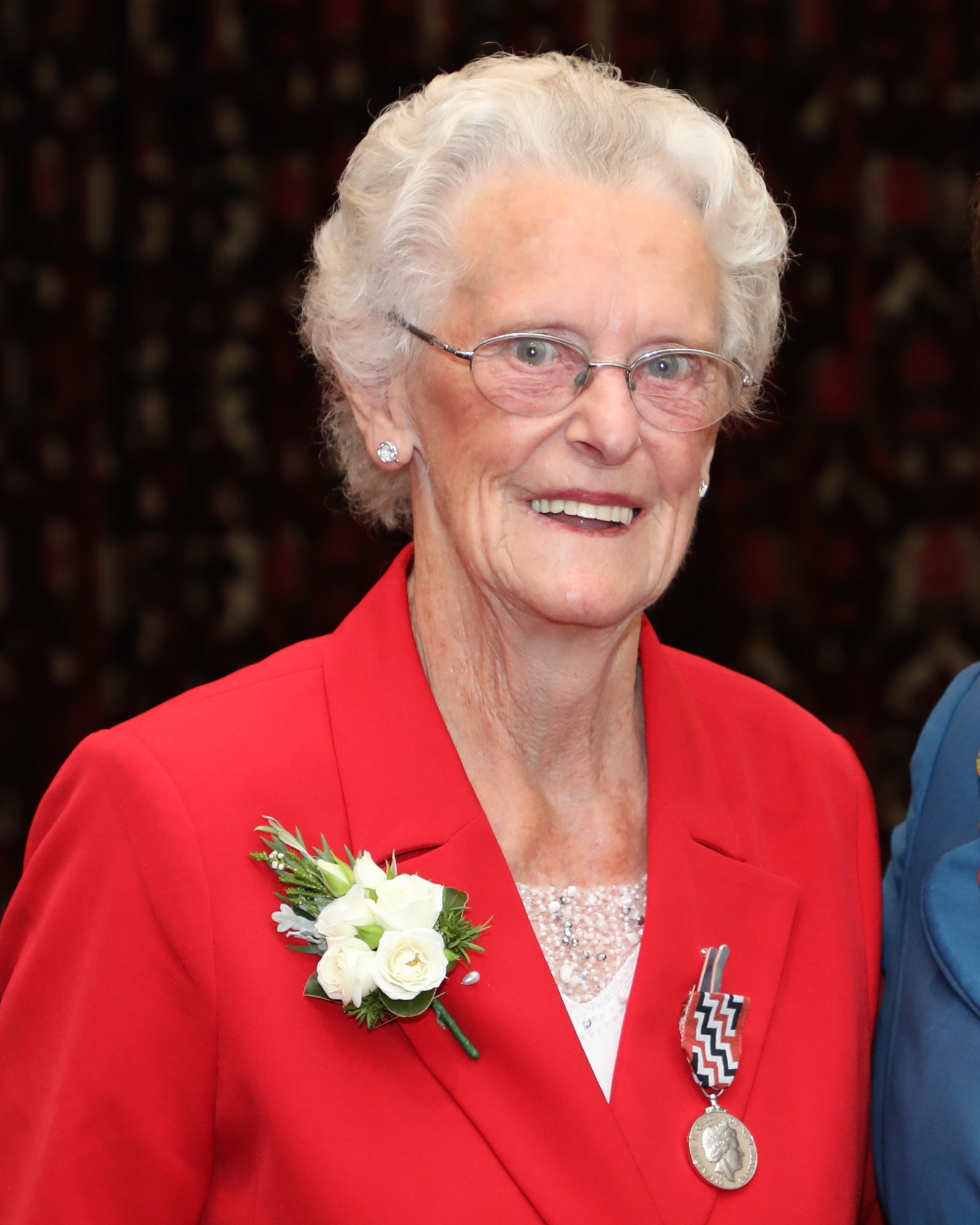
Eileen Holt

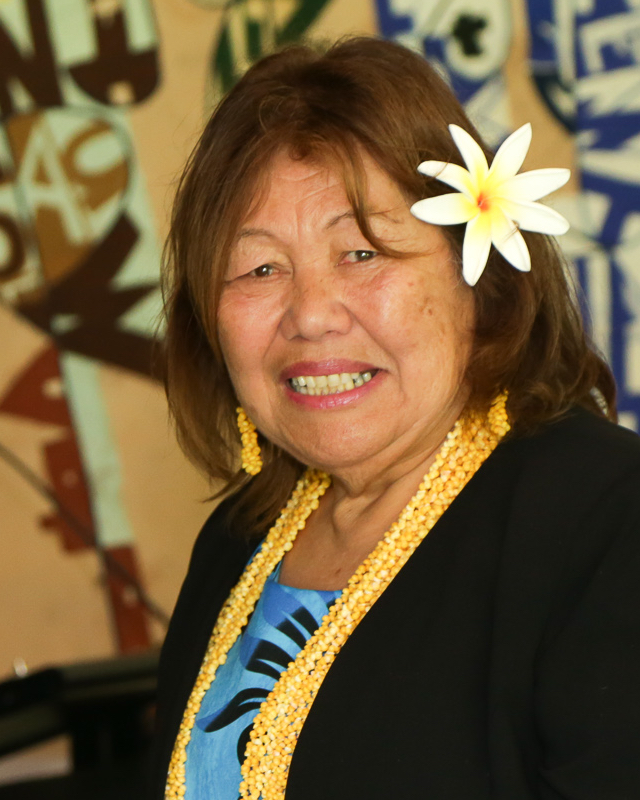
Molly Pihigia

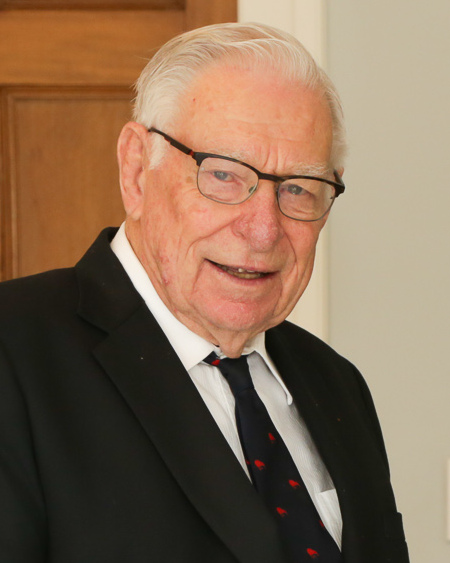
Morris McFall

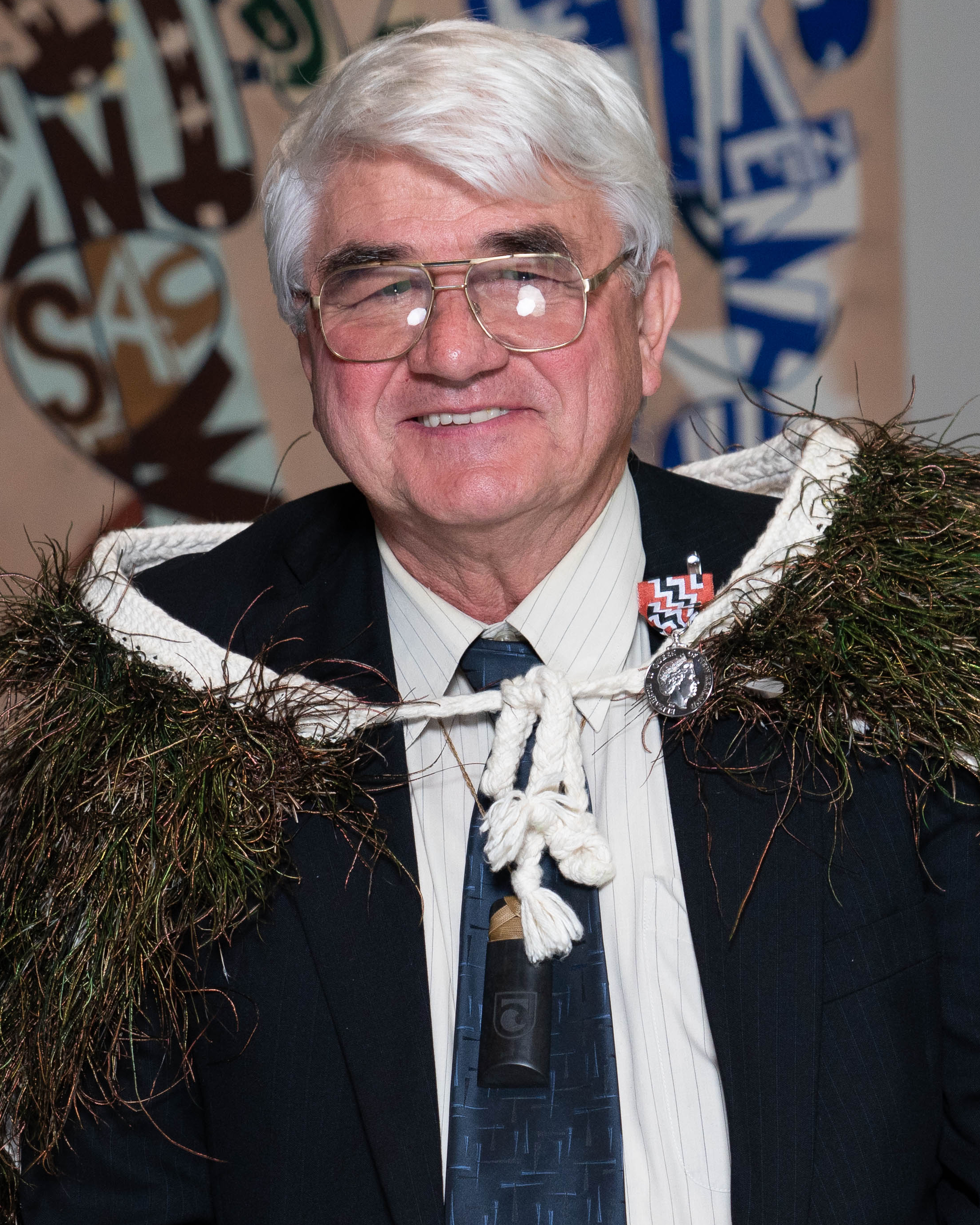
Robert McGowan

Ian Robinson

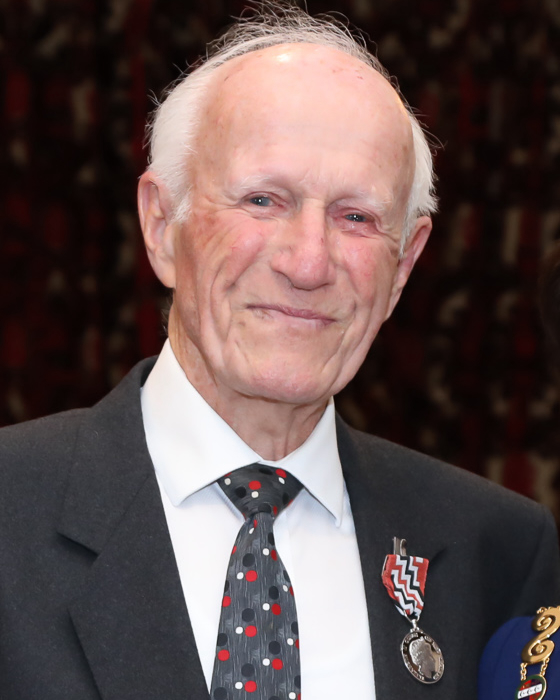
Terry Roche

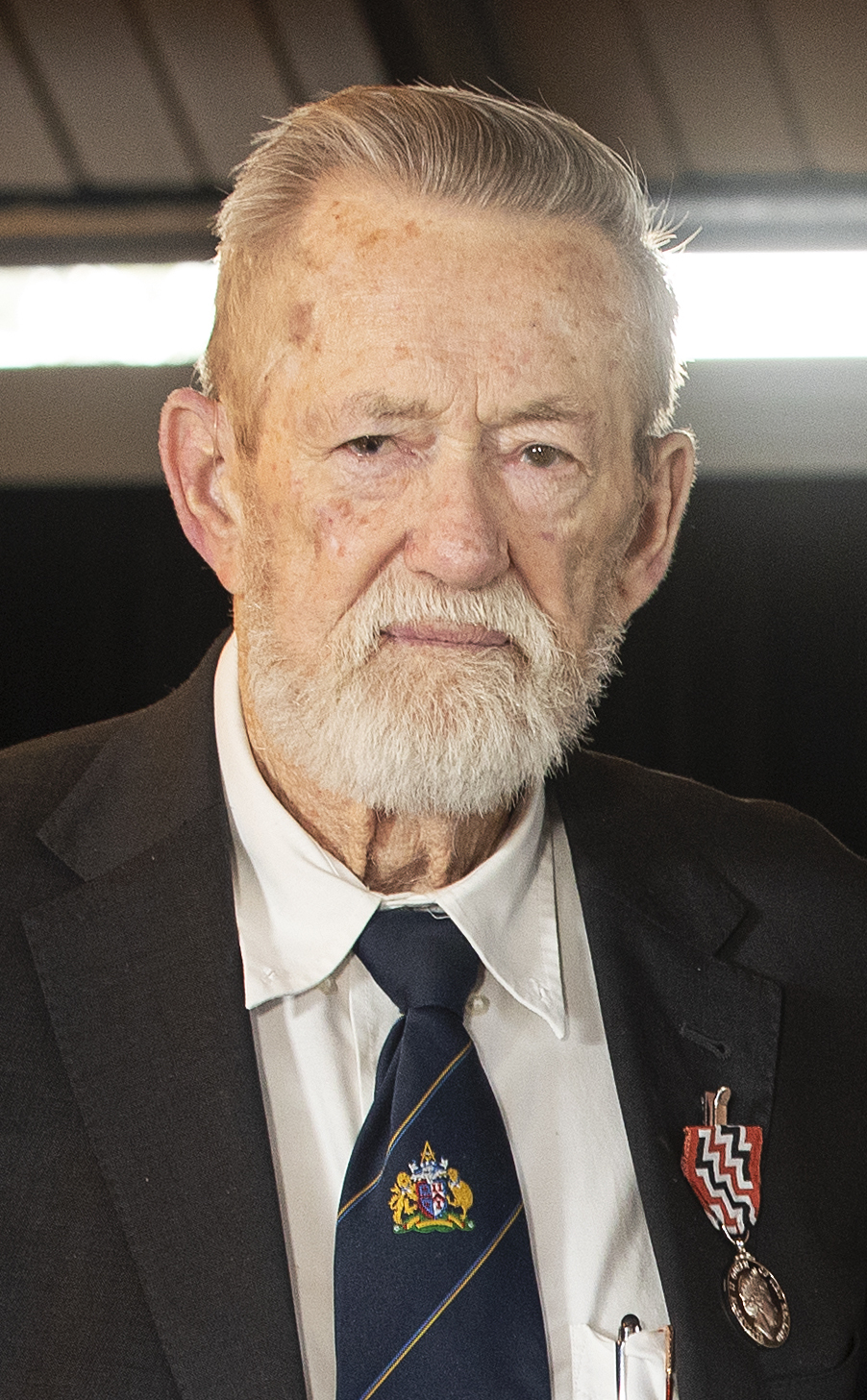
Richard Scadden

Barry Smith

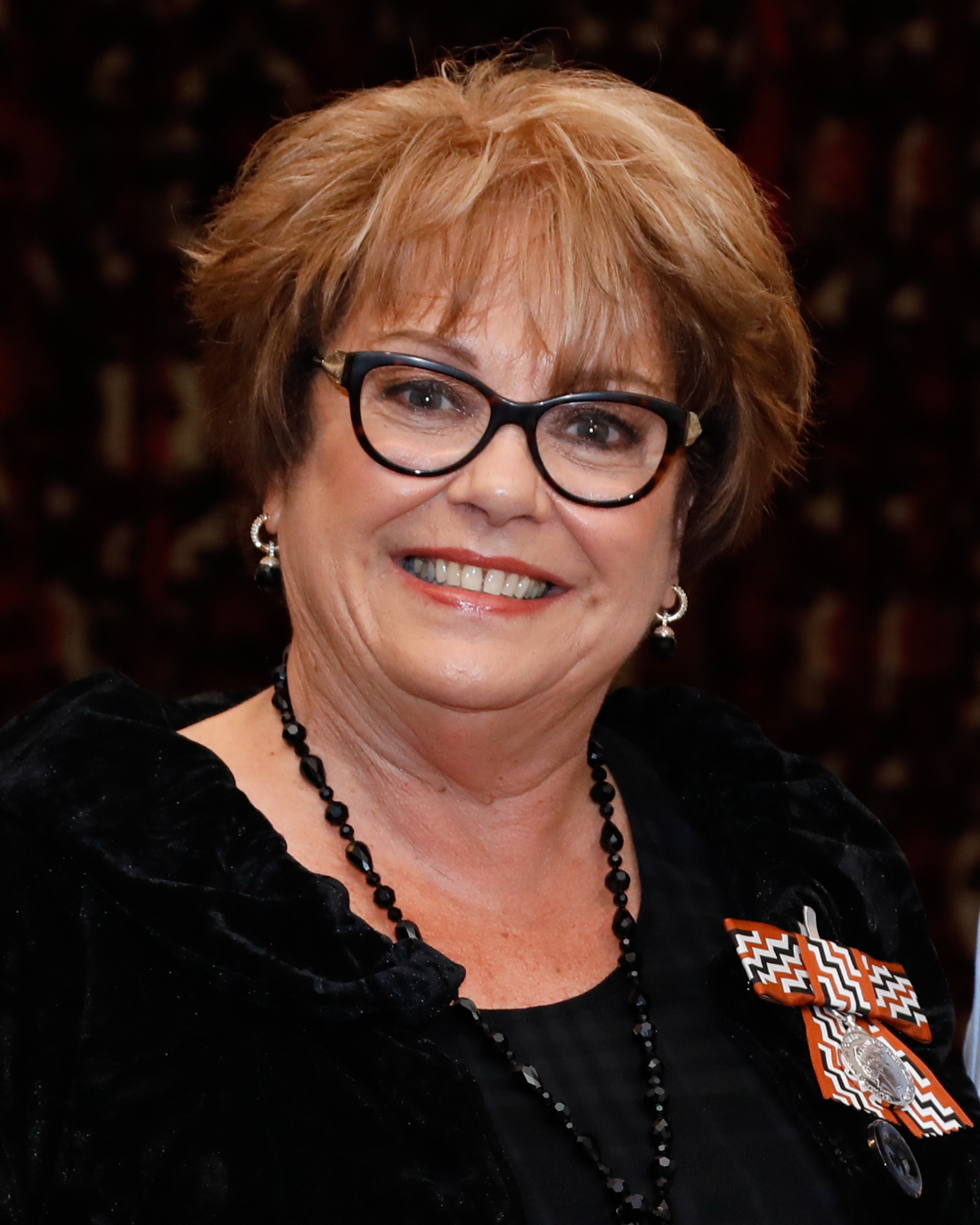
Lynn Gilbert-Smith

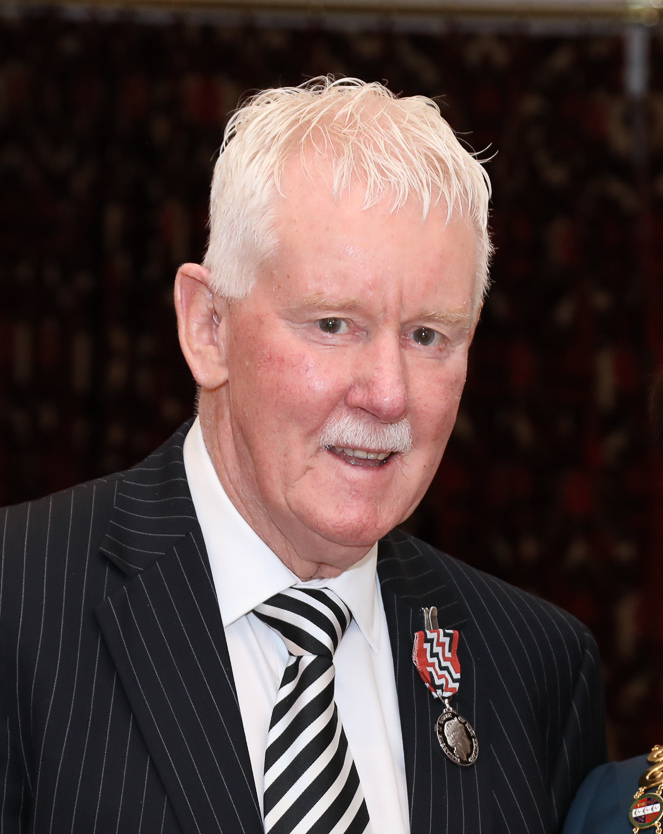
Neil Taylor

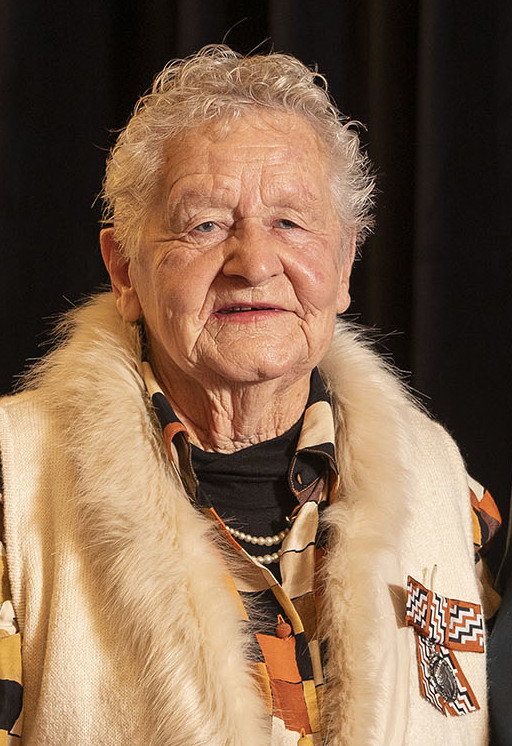
Billie Tolhill

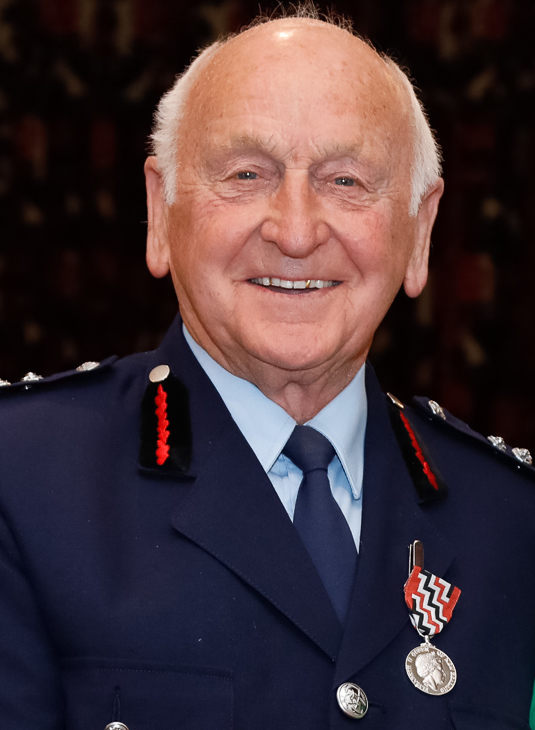
Ian Walker

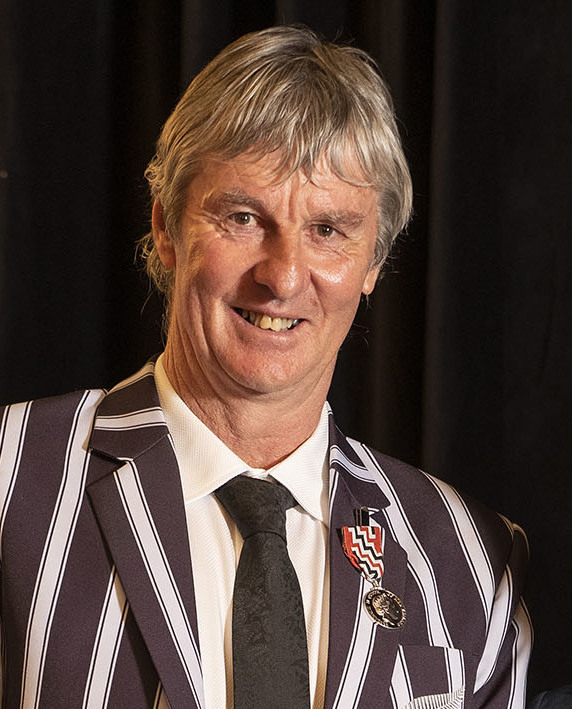
Malcolm Walker

== New Zealand Distinguished Service Decoration (DSD) ==
- Brigadier Michael John Shapland – of Wellington. For services to the New Zealand Defence Force.
