= Richardson (surname) =

Origin
- Meaning: "Son of Richard"
- Region of origin: England

Other names
- Variant forms: Richards, Dickson, Dixon, Dickens, Hicks, Higgins

Richardson is an English surname most commonly found in North East England. The prefix Richard is a given name popularised during the Middle English period, derived from the Germanic ric ("power") and hard ("brave"/"hardy"). The suffix -son denotes "son/descendant of". The names Richard and Richardson are found in records as early as 1381 in Yorkshire, England. There are variant spellings including the Swedish Richardsson. People with the name Richardson or its variants include: Dickson, Dixon.

== A ==
- A. J. Richardson (born 1995), American football player
- Abby Sage Richardson (1837–1900), American writer and center of a notorious murder trial
- Adam Richardson (Australian footballer) (born 1974), Australian rules footballer
- Al Richardson (disambiguation), multiple people
- Alan Richardson (disambiguation), multiple people called Alan, Allan, or Allen
- Albert Richardson (disambiguation), multiple people
- Alexander Richardson (disambiguation), multiple people called Alexander or Alex
- Alice Richardson (born 1986), English rugby union player
- Amos Augustus Richardson, Canadian politician
- Andrea Richardson (born 1962), American pathologist and physician-scientist
- Andrew Richardson (disambiguation), multiple people called Andrew or Andy
- Angela Richardson, British Member of Parliament elected 2019
- Anna Richardson (presenter), British television presenter
- Anna Ryder Richardson, British interior designer
- Anne Richardson (disambiguation), multiple people
- Anthony Richardson (disambiguation), multiple people called Anthony
- Antoan Richardson (born 1983), Bahamian Major League Baseball outfielder and coach
- Antonio Richardson (born 1992), American football offensive tackle
- April Richardson (born 1979), American stand-up comedian
- Archibald Read Richardson, British mathematician
- Arlan Richardson, American Professor of Geriatric Medicine
- Arnold Edwin Victor Richardson (1883–1949) Australian scientist and administrator
- Arnold Richardson (born 1928), Canadian curler
- Art Richardson, American Major League Baseball second baseman
- Arthur Richardson (disambiguation), multiple people
- Ashley Richardson, American supermodel
- Athol Richardson (1897–1982), Australian politician and judge

== B ==
- Barbara Richardson (born 1949), wife of Bill Richardson
- Barry Richardson (disambiguation), multiple people
- Ben Richardson, British cinematographer
- Bert Richardson (disambiguation), multiple people
- Bertram Richardson (1932–2020), English cricketer
- Blake Richardson (drummer) (born 1985), American drummer
- Blake Richardson (singer) (born 1999), American singer
- Bob Richardson (disambiguation), multiple people called Bob or Bobby
- Bonnie Richardson (born 1990), American track and field athlete
- Brad Richardson (born 1985), Canadian professional ice hockey centre
- Brian Richardson (disambiguation), multiple people
- Brooke Skylar Richardson (born 1999), American woman in Carlisle buried baby case
- Bryan Richardson (born 1944), English cricketer
- Bryant Richardson, American politician
- Bucky Richardson (born 1969), American football quarterback
- Sir Benjamin Ward Richardson (1828–1896), British physician

== C ==
- Calvin Richardson (born 1976), American R&B and soul singer-songwriter
- Cameron Richardson (born 1979), American actress and model
- Cameron Richardson (footballer) (born 1987), Australian rules footballer
- Carl Richardson (1921–2023), American football coach
- Carsten Richardson, early 17th-century Holsteinian-Danish naval officer and Arctic explorer
- Cecil R. Richardson, USAF chaplain
- Chad Richardson (born 1970), Canadian musician
- Charles Richardson (disambiguation) list of people named "Charles Richardson"
- Charlie and Eddie Richardson, leaders of The Richardson Gang in Britain
- Charlotte Caroline Richardson (1796–1854), British poet and writer
- Chris Richardson (born 1984), American singer-songwriter
- Chris Richardson (politician), American politician from Colorado
- Christian Richardson (born 1972), Irish TV presenter known as Robin Banks
- Claude Richardson (1900–1969), Canadian politician
- Clif Richardson (1943–2020), American politician
- Clint Richardson (born 1956), American professional basketball player
- Clive Richardson (born 1932), South African cricketer
- Colin Richardson (speedway rider) (born 1958), English motorcyclist
- Colin Richardson, British record producer, mixer and recording engineer
- Constance Stewart-Richardson (1883–1932), British dancer and author
- Cosmo P. Richardsone (1804–1852), American physician
- Curtis Richardson (born 1956), American politician
- Cyril Richardson (theologian) (1909–1976), English-born American Christian
- Cyril Richardson (born 1990), American football guard

== D ==
- D'Vontrey Richardson (born 1988), American professional baseball player
- Damien Richardson (disambiguation), multiple people
- Danny Richardson (disambiguation), multiple people
- Darrell C. Richardson (1918–2006), American Baptist minister, bibliographer and author
- Darwin Richardson (1812–1860), Mormon pioneer
- Daryl Richardson (born 1990), American football running back
- Dave Richardson (footballer)
- David Richardson (disambiguation), multiple people called Dave or David
- Davis Richardson (died 1858), American politician from Maryland
- Dawn Richardson (born 1964), American rock drummer, teacher, and writer
- Dennis Richardson (disambiguation), multiple people
- Derek Richardson (disambiguation), multiple people
- Desmond Richardson, American dancer
- Devin Richardson (born 1999), American football player
- Diana Richardson, American politician
- Dick Richardson (disambiguation), multiple people
- Dominique Richardson (born 1992), Bermudian footballer
- Don Richardson (disambiguation), multiple people
- Donna Richardson (born 1962), American fitness and aerobics instructor
- Dorothy Richardson (1873–1957), English writer
- Dot Richardson (born 1961), American softball player
- Doug Richardson, American screenwriter and novelist
- Douglas Richardson (born 1951), US genealogist and historian
- Dustin Richardson (born 1984), American professional baseball pitcher

== E ==
- Earl Richardson (disambiguation), multiple people
- Eaton J. Richardson (1816–1895) American politician, lawyer
- Edgar Preston Richardson (1902–1985), American art historian and museum director
- Edmund Richardson (1818–1886), American entrepreneur
- Edward Richardson (disambiguation), multiple people called Edward, Eddie or Ted
- Edwin Hautenville Richardson (1863–1948), British Army officer and service dogs training specialist
- Eimear Richardson (born 1986), Irish cricketer
- Elena Carter Richardson (1948–2006), American ballerina and dance instructor
- Elizabeth Richardson (disambiguation), multiple people
- Elliot Richardson (1920–1999), American politician
- Emanuel Richardson, American college basketball coach
- Emeline Hill Richardson (1910–1999), American classical archaeologist
- Erasmus Richardson, American politician
- Eric Richardson (American football) (born 1962), American wide receiver
- Eric Richardson (Australian footballer) (1891–1969), Australian rules footballer
- Ernest Richardson (disambiguation), multiple people
- Ernie Richardson (curler) (born 1931), Canadian champion
- Ernie Richardson (footballer) (1916–1977), English professional footballer
- Esther K. Richardson, Hawaii territorial representative

== F ==
- Ferdinando Richardson (1558–1618), English courtier and musician
- Fiona Richardson (1966–2017), Australian politician
- Frances Mary Richardson Currer (1785–1861), British heiress and book collector
- Frank K. Richardson (1914–1999), American jurist
- Frank Richardson (Australian footballer) (1897–1970), Australian rules footballer
- Frank Richardson (footballer, born 1897) (1897–1987), English footballer
- Frank Richardson (director) (1898–1962), American film director and screenwriter
- Frazer Richardson, English footballer
- Frederick Richardson (disambiguation), multiple people
- Friend Richardson (1865–1943), American newspaper publisher and politician

== G ==
- Garnet Richardson (1933–2016), Canadian curler
- Garth Richardson, Canadian music producer and engineer
- Gary Richardson (disambiguation), multiple people
- Gemma Richardson (born 2001), English boxer
- Geoff Richardson (disambiguation), multiple people called Geoff or Geoffrey
- Geordie Richardson (1835–1905), New Zealand merchant and ship owner
- George Richardson (disambiguation), multiple people
- Gerry Richardson (1932–1971), murdered English police officer
- Glen Richardson (born 1955), Canadian professional ice hockey player
- Gloria Richardson (1922–2021), American civil rights leader
- Gloster Richardson (1942–2020), professional American football player
- Gordie Richardson (born 1938), American professional baseball player
- Gordon Richardson, Baron Richardson of Duntisbourne (1915–2010), British banker and lawyer
- Grady Richardson (born 1952), American football tight end
- Graham Richardson (1949–2025), Australian politician
- Graham Richardson (journalist) (born 1970), Canadian television journalist
- Greg Richardson (born 1958), American boxer
- Gregory Richardson (born 1982), Guyanese footballer
- Grover C. Richardson (1948–2014), American politician
- Guy Richardson (1921–1965), British rower

== H ==
- H. L. Richardson (1927–2020), American politician
- H. Richardson, New Zealand cricketer
- Hadley Richardson (1891–1979), first wife of American author Ernest Hemingway
- Haley Lu Richardson, (born 1995), American actress and writer
- Ham Richardson (1933–2006), American tennis player
- Hamilton Richardson (1820–1906), American businessman
- Hardy Richardson (1855–1931), American professional baseball player
- Harriet Richardson (1874–1958), American carcinologist
- Harry Richardson (disambiguation), multiple people called Harry or Harold
- Heather Richardson-Bergsma (born 1989), American speed skater
- Helen Richardson (disambiguation), multiple people
- Henry Richardson (disambiguation), multiple people
- Herbert Richardson (disambiguation), multiple people
- Hester Dorsey Richardson (1862–1933), American author
- Holden C. Richardson (1878–1960), United States Navy officer and naval aviation pioneer
- Hollon Richardson (1835–1916), American Union Army officer
- Horace Richardson (American football) (born 1993), American football player
- Howard Richardson (disambiguation), multiple people
- Hugh Richardson (disambiguation), multiple people

== I ==
- Ian Richardson (disambiguation), multiple people: actor, footballers
- Iliff David Richardson (1918–2001), US officer
- Ira Richardson (1871–1958), American academic
- Israel Bush Richardson (1815–1862), American general
- Ivie Richardson (1895–1960), South African tennis player
- Ivor Richardson (1930–2014), New Zealand jurist and legal writer

== J ==
- J. Richardson (Hampshire cricketer), English cricketer
- Jack Richardson (disambiguation), multiple people
- Jackie Richardson, Canadian singer and actress
- Jackson Richardson (born 1969), French handball player
- Jake Richardson (born 1985), American actor
- James Richardson (disambiguation), multiple people
- Jane Richardson (disambiguation), multiple people
- Jared Richardson, American football player
- Jase Richardson (born 2005), American basketball player
- Jason Richardson (disambiguation), multiple people
- Jay Richardson (disambiguation), multiple people
- Jayme Richardson (born 1989), Australian Paralympic cyclist
- Jeff Richardson (disambiguation), several people
- Jeramie Richardson (born 1983), American football fullback
- Jerome Richardson (1920–2000), American jazz musician
- Jerry Richardson (1936–2023), American NFL player
- Jess Richardson (1930–1975), American Professional Football player
- Jhye Richardson (born 1996), Australian cricketer
- Jiles Perry Richardson (The Big Bopper) (1930–1959), American rock and roll musician
- Jillian Richardson (born 1965), Canadian athlete
- Jim Richardson (born 1941), English jazz bassist
- Jo Richardson, British politician
- Jock Richardson (1911–1986), Scottish footballer
- Joely Richardson, British actress
- John Richardson (disambiguation), multiple people
- John V. Richardson Jr. (born 1949), American professor
- Johnson William Richardson (1834–1862), first westbound rider for the Pony Express
- Johnstone Richardson (1899–1994), New Zealand rugby union player
- Jon Richardson, comedian
- Jonathan Richardson (disambiguation), multiple people
- Jorge Richardson (born 1976), Puerto Rican track and field athlete
- Joseph Richardson (disambiguation), multiple people called Joseph or Joe
- Josh Richardson (born 1993), American professional basketball player
- Julie Richardson, former professional tennis player
- Julieanna Richardson (born 1954), American lawyer

== K ==
- Kane Richardson born (1991), Australian international cricketer
- Kareem Richardson (born 1974), American basketball coach
- Karena Richardson (born 1959), British ice skater
- Kate Richardson (disambiguation), multiple people
- Katherine Richardson (disambiguation), multiple people called Catherine, Cathy, Katharine, Katherine, Kathy, or Katie
- Kathleen Richardson (disambiguation), multiple people
- Kaylin Richardson (born 1984), American alpine ski racer
- Keith Richardson (disambiguation), multiple people
- Kelly Richardson (born 1972), Canadian artist
- Ken Richardson (disambiguation), multiple people called Ken or Kenneth
- Kent Richardson (born 1987), American football cornerback
- Keresa Richardson, American politician
- Kevin Richardson (disambiguation), multiple people
- Kieran Richardson, English footballer
- Kieron Richardson (born 1986), English actor
- Kyle Richardson (disambiguation), multiple people
- Kym Richardson, Australian politician

== L ==
- Lancelot Richardson (1895–1917), Australian military pilot
- LaTanya Richardson (born 1949), American actress and producer
- Laura Richardson (born 1962), American politician
- Lawrence Richardson (disambiguation), multiple people called Lawrence, Larry, or Laurence
- Leam Richardson, English footballer
- Leander Richardson (1856–1918), American journalist, playwright, theatrical writer and author
- Lee Richardson (disambiguation), multiple people
- Leigh Richardson (1924–2008), Honduran-born Belizean politician
- Len Richardson (disambiguation), multiple people
- Leon Richardson (born 1957), Antiguan cyclist
- Levi Richardson (1851–1879), American gunman, gambler and buffalo hunter
- Lewis Fry Richardson (1881–1953), English mathematician
- Lewis Richardson (boxer), English boxer
- Linsdall Richardson (1881–1967), British geologist
- Liza Richardson, American music supervisor
- Lloyd J. Richardson, Sint Maarten politician and physician
- Logan Richardson (born 1980), American musician
- Logan Richardson (boxer) (born 2000), English boxer
- Lorne Richardson (born 1950), Canadian Football League defensive back
- Louie Richardson (born 1985), professional Canadian football defensive end
- Louise Richardson, Irish academic, Principal of the University of St Andrews
- Luke Richardson (born 1969), Canadian hockey player
- Lunsford Richardson (1854–1919), U.S. pharmacist
- Lyndel Richardson (born 1986), Anguillan cricketer
- Lynn Richardson (artist), Canadian artist and sculptor
- Lyon Richardson (born 2000), American baseball player

== M ==
- J. Milton Richardson (1913–1980), bishop of the Episcopal Diocese of Texas
- Maisie Richardson-Sellers (born 1992), English actress
- Malachi Richardson (born 1996), American professional basketball player
- Marc, Debra, and Jacob Richardson, Canadian victims of the Richardson family murders in 2006
- Marcia Richardson (born 1972), English athlete
- Marcus Richardson (gridiron football) (born 1984), American linebacker
- Margaret Richardson (disambiguation), multiple people
- Marie Richardson (born 1959), Swedish stage and film actress
- Marion Richardson (1892–1946), British educator and author
- Mark Richardson (disambiguation), multiple people
- Marque Richardson (born 1985), American actor
- Martin Richardson (born 1941), British-American scientist
- Marvin Thomas Richardson (born 1941), American politician known as Pro-Life (politician)
- Mary Richardson (1882/3?–1961), Canadian suffragette and vandalist
- Matterral Richardson (born 1985), American Football cornerback
- Matthew Richardson (disambiguation), multiple people
- Maurice Howe Richardson (1851–1912), US surgeon and inventor
- Max Richardson (born 1948), Australian rules footballer
- Max Richardson (sailor), British sailor
- Mayte Richardson (1889–1963), American cleric
- Mel Richardson, American politician
- Michael Richardson (disambiguation), multiple people called Michael or Mike
- Micheal Ray Richardson (1955–2025), American basketball player and head coach
- Micheál Richardson (born 1995), Irish actor
- Michele Richardson (born 1969), American competition swimmer
- Mick Richardson (1872–1920), English footballer
- Midge Richardson (1930–2012), American nun and educator
- Milo Barnum Richardson (1849–1912), American politician
- Miranda Richardson, British actress

== N ==
- Naazim Richardson (died 2020), American boxer and boxing trainer
- Nafesha Richardson, women rights' advocate and climate activist from Saint Vincent and the Grenadines
- Naomi Sewell Richardson (1892–1993), American suffragist
- Natasha Richardson (1963–2009), British actress
- Neil Richardson (disambiguation), multiple people
- Nicholas Richardson, British Classical scholar
- Nick Richardson (born 1967), English footballer
- Nicole Richardson (born 1970), Australian softball player
- Nolan Richardson (born 1941), American basketball head coach
- Nolan Richardson III (1964–2012), American college basketball coach
- Nolen Richardson (1903–1951), American baseball player
- Norman Richardson (disambiguation), multiple people called Norman or Norm

== O ==
- Origen Richardson (1795–1876), American politician
- Owen Willans Richardson (1879–1959), English physicist

== P ==
- Paddy Richardson, New Zealand writer
- Passion Richardson (born 1975), American former sprint athlete
- Patricia Richardson, American actress
- Patricia Richardson (politician), British politician
- Paul Richardson (disambiguation), multiple people
- Perry Richardson (born 1963), American rock bassist
- Perry Richardson Bass (1914–2006), an American heir, investor and philanthropist
- Peter Richardson (disambiguation), multiple people
- Philip Richardson (bishop), New Zealand Anglican
- Phillip J. S. Richardson (1875–1973), British writer on dance
- Phillip Richardson (cyclist) (born 1949), Trinidad cyclist
- Pooh Richardson (born 1966), American basketball player

== Q ==
- Quentin Richardson (born 1980), NBA basketball player

== R ==
- Ralph Richardson (disambiguation) several people
- Ralph Richardson (politician born 1812) (1812–1897), New Zealand politician
- Rex Richardson (born 1983), American politician
- Ric Richardson (born 1962), Australian litigant and inventor
- Richard Richardson (disambiguation), multiple people called Richard or Richie
- Rico Richardson (born 1991), American football player
- Robert Richardson (disambiguation), multiple people
- Robin Richardson, Progressive Conservative party member of the Canadian House of Commons
- Roger Wolcott Richardson (1930–1993), American mathematician
- Roland Richardson (1878–1949), Canadian-American mathematician (known as R. G. D. Richardson)
- Ron Richardson (1952–1995), American actor and operatic baritone
- Ronald Richardson (1927–1998), English cricketer
- Roy Richardson (born 1963), former Sint Maartener cricketer
- Rupert Richardson (1930–2008), American Civil Rights activist
- Russell Richardson (born 1977), Australian professional rugby league footballer
- Ruth Richardson (born 1950), New Zealand politician
- Sir Ralph Richardson (1902–1983), British actor

== S ==
- Salli Richardson, American television and film actress
- Samuel Richardson (disambiguation), multiple people called Samuel or Sam
- Sarah Richardson (born 1971), Canadian designer and television personality
- Scott Richardson (disambiguation), multiple people
- Sean Richardson (disambiguation), multiple people
- Sha'Carri Richardson (born 2000), American sprinter
- Shane Richardson (American football), American football coach and player
- Shane Richardson (rugby league), Australian rugby league administrator
- Shannon Richardson (born 1977), American actress and convicted felon
- Shaquille Richardson (born 1992), American football player
- Shaun Richardson (born 1985), Arena football linebacker
- Sheldon Richardson (born 1990), American football defensive end
- Sid W. Richardson (1891–1959), Texas businessman and philanthropist
- Simon Richardson (disambiguation), multiple people
- Simone Richardson (born 1973), Dutch politician
- Soko Richardson (1939–2004), American rhythm and blues drummer
- Sophia Foster Richardson (1855–1916), American mathematician
- Spec Richardson (1922–2016), American baseball manager
- Steve Richardson (disambiguation), multiple people called Steve, Steven, or Stephen
- Stuart Richardson, bassist for the Welsh band Lostprophets
- Susan Richardson (disambiguation), multiple people
- Sy Richardson (born 1941), American film and television actor
- Sylvan Richardson, British guitarist and composer
- Sylvia Richardson, French Bayesian statistician

== T ==
- Terry Richardson (born 1965), American fashion photographer
- Terry Richardson (ice hockey) (born 1953), Canadian ice hockey player
- Terry Richardson (rugby league), English professional rugby league footballer
- Thomas Richardson (disambiguation) list of people named "Thomas Richardson"
- Tim Richardson (disambiguation), multiple people
- Todd Richardson (born 1976), American politician
- Tom Richardson (cricketer) (1870–1912), English cricketer
- Tom Richardson (pinch hitter) (1883–1939), American baseball player
- Tony Richardson (disambiguation), multiple people
- Tracey Richardson (born 1982), British diver
- Tre Richardson (born 2004), American football player
- Trent Richardson (born 1990), American football running back

== U ==
- Udney Richardson (1869–1943), Canadian politician

== V ==
- Vaughan Richardson (died 1729), English organist and composer
- Victor Richardson (disambiguation), multiple people called Victor or Vic
- Virgil Richardson (disambiguation), multiple people

== W ==
- Wally Richardson (born 1974), American football quarterback
- Wally Richardson (footballer), English footballer
- Walter Richardson (disambiguation), several people
- Wayne Richardson (born 1946), Australian rules footballer
- Wendy Richardson (born 1933), Australian playwright
- Wes Richardson (1930–2011), Canadian curler
- Wilds P. Richardson (1861–1929), American explorer and geographer
- William Richardson (disambiguation) list of people named William, Bill, Billy, Will, or Willie
- Willis Richardson (1889–1977), American playwright
- Willis Richardson (American football), American professional football player-coach
- Wyman Richardson (1896–1953), American physician and author

== Y ==
- Yvette Richardson, American meteorologist and expert on severe convection/tornadoes

== See also ==
- General Richardson (disambiguation)
- Governor Richardson (disambiguation)
- Judge Richardson (disambiguation)
- Justice Richardson (disambiguation)
- Senator Richardson (disambiguation)
