= Charles Richardson =

Charles Richardson may refer to:

== Sportspeople ==
- Charles Richardson (umpire) (1853–1925), English Test cricket umpire
- Charles Richardson (cricketer, born 1864) (1864–1949), Australian-born New Zealand cricketer
- Charles Richardson (Essex cricketer) (1885–1948), English cricketer who played for Essex
- Charles Richardson (Lincolnshire cricketer) (born 1946), former English cricketer who played for Lincolnshire
- Charlie Richardson (American football) (1906–1977), former blocking back in the National Football League

== Politics ==
- Charles Richardson (Australian politician) (fl. 1861), New South Wales politician
- Charles Richardson (Upper Canada politician) (1805–1848), lawyer and political figure in Upper Canada
- Charles Edward Richardson, Canadian politician

== Other ==
- Charles Richardson (Royal Navy officer) (1769–1850), British admiral
- Charles "Sis Doc" Richardson (1864-1924), American dentist, founder of Chi Omega
- Charles Lennox Richardson (1834–1862), British merchant
- Charles Richardson (British Army officer) (1908–1994), British Army general
- Charles Douglas Richardson (1853–1932), Australian artist
- Charles Richardson (civil engineer) (1814–1896), British civil engineer
- Charles Richardson (cement merchant) (1819–1878), British businessman
- Charles Richardson (lexicographer) (1775–1865), English teacher, lexicographer and linguist
- Charlie Richardson (1934–2012), British mobster
- Charles Richardson, a stage name sometimes used by Marius Goring (1912–1998)
- Charles Parks Richardson (born 1971), American entrepreneur, doctor and inventor
- Charles S. Richardson (1854–1904), first president of South Dakota's normal school, Madison Normal, that later became Dakota State University
- Charles C. Richardson (born 1935), American biochemist and professor
- Charles James Richardson (1806–1871), English architect, artist and writer
