= Albert Edward Richardson =

Albert Edward Richardson may refer to:

- Albert Richardson (architect) (1880–1964), English architect
- Albert E. Richardson (inventor), English inventor who designed the first practical Teasmade

== See also ==
- Albert Richardson (disambiguation)
