= Arthur Richardson =

Arthur Richardson may refer to:

- Arthur Richardson (Australian cricketer) (1888–1973), Australian Test cricketer
- Arthur Richardson (politician) (1860–1936), British Member of Parliament for Nottingham South and Rotherham
- Arthur Richardson (footballer, born 1880) (1880–1951), Australian rules footballer for St Kilda
- Arthur Richardson (footballer, born 1913) (1913–1993), English football centre forward
- Arthur Richardson (footballer, born 1928) (1928–2001), Australian rules footballer for South Melbourne
- Arthur Charles Jeston Richardson (1872–1939), Australian cyclist and mining engineer, first man to circumnavigate Australia on a bicycle
- Arthur Herbert Lindsay Richardson (1872–1932), Canadian recipient of the Victoria Cross
- Arthur R. Richardson (1862–1936), pilot, farmer and political figure in Nova Scotia, Canada
- Arthur Walker Richardson (1907–1983), English cricketer
