= Colin Richardson (cricketer) =

Australian cricketer

Personal information
- Full name: Colin George Richardson
- Born: 6 June 1920; Hobart, Tasmania, Australia
- Died: 22 December 1993 (aged 73); Hobart, Tasmania, Australia
- Batting: Left-handed
- Bowling: Left-arm fast-medium
- Relatives: Les Richardson (father); Leslie Richardson (brother); Reginald Richardson (brother); Brian Richardson (brother); Ted Richardson (brother); Walter Richardson (uncle)

Domestic team information
- Years: Team
- 1946/47–1950/51: Tasmania
- Source: Cricinfo, 8 March 2016

Colin George Richardson (6 June 1920 – 22 December 1993) was an Australian cricketer. He played eight first-class matches for Tasmania between the 1946–47 season and 1950–51.

Born at Hobart in 1920, Richardson was one of five brothers who played first-class cricket for the state team; his father and uncle also played first-class matches for Tasmania. A left-arm fast bowler who played club cricket for the North Hobart and New Town clubs, he made his first-class debut in a December 1946 match against Victoria, taking a five-wicket haul in Victoria's second innings, despite only bowling three overs.

Later the same season he played against the touring touring English team, and the following season played twice against the touring Indians. In his eight first-class matches he took a total of 25 wickets, including a second five-wicket haul taken against Victoria in 1948–49.

Richardson died at Hobart in 1993. He was aged 73.
