= Joseph Richardson =

Joseph or Joe Richardson may refer to:

- Joseph Richardson (American politician) (1778–1871), United States Representative from Massachusetts
- Joseph Richardson (Liberal politician) (1830–1902), Liberal Party politician in England, MP for South East Durham in the 1890s
- Joseph Richardson (1755–1803), journalist, poet and MP for Newport, Cornwall 1796–1803
- Joseph Richardson (lithophone player) (1792–1855), English musician
- Joseph Richardson (flautist) (1814–1862), English flautist
- Joseph Richardson (cricketer) (1878–1951), Australian cricketer
- Joseph Richardson (English artist)
- Joseph Richardson Sr. (1711–1784), American silversmith
- Joseph Richardson Jr. (1752–1831), American silversmith
- Joe Richardson (footballer, born 1908) (1908–1977), English footballer
- Joe Richardson (footballer, born 1942) (1942–1966), English footballer
- Joe Richardson (rugby league) (1879–1904), English rugby league player
- Joe M. Richardson (died 2015), author and history professor in Florida
