= Alexander Richardson =

Alexander or Alex Richardson may refer to:

- Alexander Richardson (basketball) (born 2003), German basketball player
- Alexander Richardson (Puritan intellectual) (c1565-1613?)
- Alexander Richardson (bobsledder) (1887–1964), Major-General British Army during WWII,, silver medallist bobsledder at the 1924 Winter Olympics
- Alexander Richardson (MP) (1864–1928), British politician
- Alexander Robert Richardson (1847–1931), Australian pastoralist and politician
- Alex Richardson, founder of Netkey

== See also ==
- Alexandar Richardson (born 1990), British cyclist
- Al Richardson (disambiguation)
- Richardson (surname)
