= Katherine Richardson =

Katherine Richardson (or similar) may refer to:

- Cathy Richardson (born 1969), American singer-songwriter
- Katharine Richardson (1854–1927), British mountain climber
- Katherine Richardson (swimmer), Canadian swimmer
- Katherine Gilmore Richardson, member of the Philadelphia City Council.
- Katherine Richardson Christensen (born 1954), American-Danish oceanographer
- Kathy Kreag Richardson (born 1956), American Republican politician
- Katie Richardson (born 1988), Australian beauty pageant winner
- Catherine Eliza Richardson (1777–1853), Scottish author and poet
- Katharine Berry Richardson (1837–1933), American physician and surgeon

== See also ==
- Kate Richardson (disambiguation)
- Kathleen Richardson (disambiguation)
- Richardson (surname)
