= Len Richardson =

Len Richardson can refer to:

- Len Richardson (athlete) (1881-1955), a South African Olympic athlete
- Len Richardson (cricketer) (born 1950), an Australian cricketer
- Len Richardson (footballer) (1891-1924), an Australian rules footballer
