= Tom Richards =

Tom Richards may refer to:

- Tom Richards (actor) (born 1948), Australian actor
- Tom Richards (athlete) (1910–1985), British marathon runner
- Tom Richards (rugby union, born 1882) (1882–1935), Australian rugby union player
- Tom Richards (rugby union, born 1895) (1895–1975), Welsh rugby union player
- Tom Richards (squash player) (born 1986), English squash player
- Tom Richards (footballer) (born 1994), English football player

== See also ==
- Thomas Richards (disambiguation)
