= Priority (biology) =

Principle of biological nomenclature

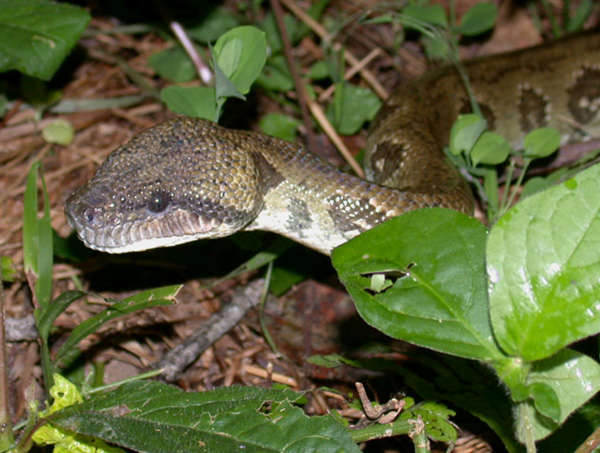
Sanzinia madagascariensis was moved to the genus Boa. To avoid having the same name as another snake, it was renamed Boa manditra. On further investigation, it was established that the move had been incorrect, so the original name was reinstated as the valid name.

Priority is a principle in biological taxonomy by which a valid scientific name is established based on the oldest available name. It is a decisive rule in botanical and zoological nomenclature to recognise the first binomial name (also called binominal name in zoology) given to an organism as the correct and acceptable name. The purpose is to select one scientific name as a stable one out of two or more alternate names that often exist for a single species.

The International Code of Nomenclature for algae, fungi, and plants (ICN) defines it as: "A right to precedence established by the date of valid publication of a legitimate name or of an earlier homonym, or by the date of designation of a type." Basically, it is a scientific procedure to eliminate duplicate or multiple names for a species, for which Lucien Marcus Underwood called it "the principle of outlaw in nomenclature".

== History ==
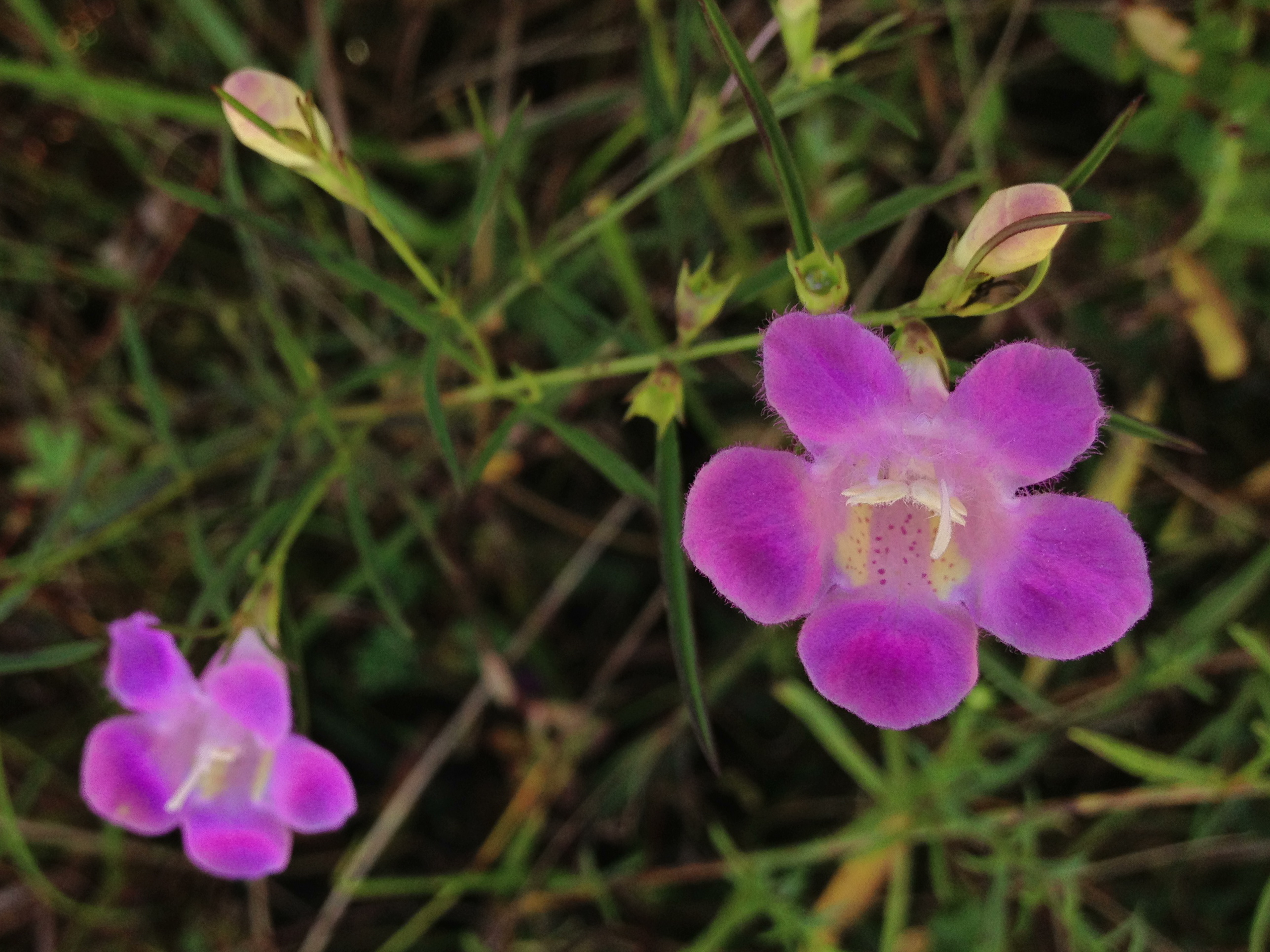
The North American wildflower genus Agalinis was published in 1837, but for a long time, it was included in the ambiguously named genus Gerardia. In 1961, the problem with the name Gerardia was resolved, and Agalinis came into common use. However, three relatively unknown names for the genus had been published earlier: Virgularia Ruiz & Pav. in 1794, Chytra C.F.Gaertn. in 1807, and Tomanthera Raf. in 1837, of which Virgularia would have priority. These three names have since been rejected in favour of Agalinis.

The principle of priority has not always been in place. When Carl Linnaeus laid the foundations of modern nomenclature, he offered no recognition of prior names. The botanists who followed him were just as willing to overturn Linnaeus's names. The first sign of recognition of priority came in 1813, when A. P. de Candolle laid out some principles of good nomenclatural practice. He favoured retaining prior names, but left wide scope for overturning poor prior names.

=== In botany ===
During the 19th century, the principle gradually came to be accepted by almost all botanists, but debate continued to rage over the conditions under which the principle might be ignored. Botanists on one side of the debate argued that priority should be universal and without exception. This would have meant a one-off major disruption as countless names in current usage were overturned in favour of archaic prior names. In 1891, Otto Kuntze, one of the most vocal proponents of this position, did just that, publishing over 30000 new combinations in his Revisio Generum Plantarum. He then followed with further such publications in 1893, 1898 and 1903. His efforts, however, were so disruptive that they appear to have benefited his opponents. By the 1900s, the need for a mechanism for the conservation of names was widely accepted, and details of such a mechanism were under discussion. The current system of "modified priority" was essentially put in place at the Cambridge Congress of 1930.

=== In zoology ===
By the 19th century, the Linnaean binomial system was generally adopted by zoologists. In doing so, many zoologists tried to dig up the oldest possible scientific names, as a result of which proper and consistent names prevailing at the time, including those by the eminent zoologists like Louis Agassiz, Georges Cuvier, Charles Darwin, Thomas Huxley, Richard Owen, etc. came to be challenged. Scientific organisations tried to establish practical rules for changing names, but not a uniform system.

The first zoological code with priority rule was initially formulated in 1842 by a committee appointed by the British Association. The committee included Charles Darwin, John Stevens Henslow, Leonard Jenyns, William Ogilby, John O. Westwood, John Phillips, Ralph Richardson and Hugh Edwin Strickland. The first meeting was at Darwin's house in London. The committee's report, written by Strickland, was implemented as the Rules of Zoological Nomenclature, and popularly known as the Stricklandian Code. It was not endorsed by all zoologists, as it allowed naming, renaming, and reclassifying with relative ease, as Science reported: "The worst feature of this abuse is not so much the bestowal of unknown names of well-known creatures as the transfer of one to another."

== Principle ==
In zoology, the principle of priority is defined by the International Code of Zoological Nomenclature (4th edition, 1999) in its article 23:

The valid name of a taxon is the oldest available name applied to it, unless that name has been invalidated or another name is given precedence by any provision of the Code or by any ruling of the Commission [the International Commission on Zoological Nomenclature]. For this reason priority applies to the validity of synonyms [Art. 23.3], to the relative precedence of homonyms [Arts. 53-60], the correctness or otherwise of spellings [Arts. 24, 32], and to the validity of nomenclatural acts (such as acts taken under the Principle of the First Reviser [Art. 24.2] and the fixation of name-bearing types [Arts. 68, 69, 74.1.3, 75.4]).

There are exceptions: another name may be given precedence by any provision of the Code or by any ruling of the commission. According to the ICZN preamble:

Priority of publication is a basic principle of zoological nomenclature; however, under conditions prescribed in the Code its application may be modified to conserve a long-accepted name in its accustomed meaning. When stability of nomenclature is threatened in an individual case, the strict application of the Code may under specified conditions be suspended by the International Commission on Zoological Nomenclature.

In botany, the principle is defined by the Shenzhen Code (or the International Code of Nomenclature for algae, fungi, and plants) in 2017 in its article 11:

Each family or lower-ranked taxon with a particular circumscription, position, and rank can bear only one correct name. Special exceptions are made for nine families and one subfamily for which alternative names are permitted (see Art. 18.5 and 19.8). The use of separate names is allowed for fossil-taxa that represent different parts, life-history stages, or preservational states of what may have been a single organismal taxon or even a single individual (Art. 1.2).

== Concept ==
Priority has two aspects:

1. The first formal scientific name published for a plant or animal taxon shall be the name that is to be used, called the valid name in zoology and correct name in botany (principle of synonymy).
2. Once a name has been used, no subsequent publication of that name for another taxon shall be valid (zoology) or validly published (botany) (principle of homonymy).

Note that nomenclature for botany and zoology is independent, and the rules of priority regarding homonyms operate within each discipline but not between them. Thus, an animal and a plant can bear the same name, which is then called a hemihomonym.

There are formal provisions for making exceptions to the principle of priority under each of the Codes. If an archaic or obscure prior name is discovered for an established taxon, the current name can be declared a nomen conservandum (botany) or conserved name (zoology), and so conserved against the prior name. Conservation may be avoided entirely in zoology, as these names may fall in the formal category of nomen oblitum. Similarly, if the current name for a taxon is found to have an archaic or obscure prior homonym, the current name can be declared a nomen protectum (zoology) or the older name suppressed, becoming a nomen rejiciendum (botany).

== Application ==
In botany and horticulture, the principle of priority applies to names at the rank of family and below. When moves are made to another genus or from one species to another, the "final epithet" of the name is combined with the new genus name, with any adjustments necessary for Latin grammar, for example:

- When Festuca subgenus Schedonorus was moved to the genus Lolium, its name became Lolium subgenus Schedonorus.
- Xiphion danfordiae Baker was moved to Juno danfordiae (Baker) Klatt, Iridodictyum danfordiae (Baker) Nothdurft and Iris danfordiae (Baker) Boiss. The name enclosed in parentheses cites the author who published the specific epithet, and the name after the parentheses cites the author who published the new combination of the specific epithet with the generic name.
- Orthocarpus castillejoides var. humboldtiensis D.D. Keck was moved to Castilleja ambigua var. humboldtiensis (D.D. Keck) J.M. Egger.
- When Caladenia alata was moved to the genus Petalochilus, the grammatical gender of the Latin words required a change in ending of the species epithet to the masculine form, Petalochilus alatus.

In zoology, the principle of priority applies to names between the rank of superfamily and subspecies (not to varieties, which are below the rank of subspecies). Also unlike in botany, the authorship of new combinations is not tracked, and only the original authority is ever cited. Example:

- A.A. Girault published a description of a wasp, as Epentastichus fuscus, on 10 December 1913, and on 29 December 1913, he published a description of a related species, as Neomphaloides fusca. Eventually, both of these species were later transferred to the same genus, Aprostocetus, at which point they both would have become Aprostocetus fuscus (Girault, 1913), except that the one published 19 days later was the junior homonym, and its name was replaced with Aprostocetus fuscosus Bouček, 1988.

== Examples ==
- In 1855, John Edward Gray published the name Antilocapra anteflexa for a new species of pronghorn, based on a pair of horns. However, it is now thought that his specimen belonged to an unusual individual of an existing species, Antilocapra americana, with a name published by George Ord in 1815. The older name, by Ord, takes priority; with Antilocapra anteflexa becoming a junior synonym.
- In 1856, Johann Jakob Kaup published the name Leptocephalus brevirostris for a new species of eel. However, it was realized in 1893 that the organism described by Kaup was in fact the juvenile form of the European eel (see eel life history for the full story). The European eel was named Muraena anguilla by Carl Linnaeus in 1758. So Muraena anguilla is the name to be used for the species, and Leptocephalus brevirostris must be considered as a junior synonym and not be used. Today the European eel is classified in the genus Anguilla (Garsault, 1764,) so its currently used name is Anguilla anguilla (Linnaeus, 1758).

== See also ==
- Kew Rule
