= Richard Richardsson =

Richard Richardsson may refer to:

- Richard Richardsson (snowboarder)
- Richard Richardsson (footballer)

== See also ==
- Richard Richardson (disambiguation)
