= George Richardson =

George Richardson may refer to:

== Arts, entertainment, and literature ==
- George Richardson (architect) (1737/8–c. 1813), Scottish architect and writer
- George T. Richardson (1862–1938), American playwright, theatre critic, and journalist

== Military figures ==
- Sir George Richardson (Indian Army officer) (1847–1931), British military officer and commander of the Ulster Volunteers
- George Richardson (VC) (1831–1923), Irish Victoria Cross winner
- Sir George Spafford Richardson (1868–1938), New Zealand military leader and administrator, and local body politician in Auckland

== Politicians ==
- George Richardson (Canadian politician) (1916–2000), Canadian politician
- George Richardson (New Zealand politician) (1837–1909), New Zealand politician
- George F. Richardson (1850–1923), U.S. Representative from Michigan
- George C. Richardson (1808–1886), mayor of Cambridge, Massachusetts
- George W. Richardson (Massachusetts politician) (1829–1886), American politician in Massachusetts
- George Francis Richardson (1829–1912), American lawyer and politician in Massachusetts
- George W. Richardson (Maryland politician) (died 1930), American politician in Maryland
- George L. Richardson (1843–1914), member of the Virginia House of Delegates

== Sportspeople ==
- George Richardson (cricketer) (1834–1911), Australian cricketer
- George H. Richardson (died 1948), owner of the Washington Senators, 1920–1949
- George Richardson (baseball), Negro league baseball player, 1901–1903
- George Richardson (ice hockey) (1886–1916), Canadian ice hockey player
- George Richardson (footballer, born 1891) (1891–?), English football outside right who played for Huddersfield Town and others
- George Richardson (footballer, born 1899) (1899–1963), Scottish football wing half who played for Lincoln City, Sheffield United and Boscombe
- George Richardson (footballer, born 1901) (1901–?), English football left half or forward who played for Hartlepools United and Newport County
- George Richardson (footballer, born 1912) (1912–1968), English football inside forward who played for Sheffield United, Hull City, and Bangor City

== Other people ==
- Geordie Richardson (1835–1905), New Zealand merchant and ship owner with the full name of George Edward Gordon Richardson
- George Barclay Richardson (1924–2019), British economist and Warden of Keble College, Oxford
- George Burr Richardson (1872–1949), geologist
- George J. Richardson (1893–1980), American labor unionist
- George S. Richardson (engineer) (1896–1988), American engineer and bridge designer
