= Edward Richardson (disambiguation) =

Edward Richardson (1830/31–1915) was an engineer and New Zealand politician.

Edward Richardson may also refer to:

- Edward George Richardson (1903–1987), nationalist politician in Northern Ireland
- J. Edward Richardson (1873–?), American architect
- Edward Richardson (cricketer) (1929–2009), Australian cricketer
- Edward Richardson (sculptor) (1812–1869), English sculptor
- Edward Richardson (gymnast) (1879–1961)
- Edward Richardson (priest) (1862–1921), Archdeacon of Blackburn
- Ted Richardson (1902–?), footballer
- Eddie Richardson, English criminal
- Eddie Richardson (cricketer) (born 1990), Irish cricketer
- Edward A. Richardson (1924–2019), Connecticut tree expert
- Charles Edward Richardson, Canadian politician

== See also ==
- Ed Richardson
