= Ken Rickards =

Ken or Kenneth Rickards may refer to:

- Ken Rickards (cricketer) (1923–1995), Jamaican cricketer
- Ken Rickards (footballer) (1929–2018), English footballer

== See also ==
- Ken Richards (1934–1972), Welsh rugby league and rugby union player
- Kenneth Richards (died 1994), New Zealand beekeeper killed in the collapse of the Te Rata Bridge
- Ken Richardson (disambiguation)
