= Senator Richardson =

Senator Richardson may refer to:

== Member of the Australian Senate ==
- Graham Richardson (born 1949), member of the Australian Senate from 1983 to 1994

== Member of the Northern Irish Senate ==
- Henry Richardson (Northern Ireland politician) (1883–?), Northern Irish Senator from 1949 to 1957

== Members of the United States Senate ==
- Harry A. Richardson (1853–1928), U.S. Senator from Delaware from 1907 to 1913
- William Alexander Richardson (1811–1875), U.S. Senator from Illinois from 1863 to 1865

== United States state senate members ==
- Bryant Richardson (fl. 2010s), Delaware State Senate
- Elaine Richardson (politician) (born 1940), Arizona State Senate
- Gary Richardson (Arizona politician) (fl. 1990s–2000s), Arizona State Senate
- George Francis Richardson (1829–1912), Massachusetts State Senate
- H. L. Richardson (1927–2020), California State Senate
- Hamilton Richardson (1820–1906), Wisconsin State Senate
- Harris S. Richardson (1887–1976), Massachusetts State Senate
- Harrison Richardson (1930–2009), Maine State Senate
- James Burchill Richardson (1770–1836), South Carolina
- James D. Richardson (1843–1914), Tennessee State Senate
- John Peter Richardson II (1801–1864), South Carolina
- Mel Richardson (1928–2014), Idaho State Senate
- William B. Richardson (1874–1945), Minnesota State Senate
- William P. Richardson (New York politician) (1848–1923), New York State Senate
