= Anne Richardson =

Anne or Ann Richardson may refer to:

- G. Anne Richardson (born 1956), chief
- Anne Vavasour (fl. 1580s), married name Richardson
- Anne Richardson (lawyer) see Obaidullah (detainee)
- Anne Richardson (conservationist), New Zealand conservationist
- Ann Richardson (oncologist), New Zealand oncologist

== See also ==
- Ann Richards (disambiguation)
