= Margaret Richards =

Margaret Richards may refer to:

- Margaret Richards (architect) (1928–2022), Scottish architect
- Margaret Richards (bowls), Canadian lawn bowler

== See also ==
- Margaret Richardson (disambiguation)
