= Lee Richardson =

Lee Richardson is the name of:

- Lee Richardson (actor) (1926–1999), American character actor
- Lee Richardson (politician) (born 1947), Canadian politician
- Lee Richardson (footballer) (born 1969), British football manager
- Lee Richardson (speedway rider) (1979–2012), British motorcycle speedway rider

== See also ==
- Leigh Richardson (1924–2008), Belizean politician
- Richardson (surname)
