= Kathleen Richardson (disambiguation) =

Kathleen Richardson, Baroness Richardson of Calow (born 1938), is an English political figure.

Kathleen Richardson may also refer to:

- Kathleen M. Richardson (1928–2019), Canadian philanthropist and arts patron
- Kathleen Richardson (camogie), played in All-Ireland Senior Club Camogie Championship 1969
- Kathleen A. Richardson, American professor of optics
- Kathleen Richardson (mountaineer) (1854–1927), British mountain climber

== See also ==
- Kat Richardson, American author
- Kate Richardson (disambiguation)
- Katherine Richardson (disambiguation)
