= James Richardson =

James Richardson may refer to:

== Politicians ==
- James Armstrong Richardson (1922–2004), Canadian politician
- James Burchill Richardson (1770–1836), Governor of South Carolina, 1802–1804
- James D. Richardson (1843–1914), Democrat from Tennessee, U.S. House Minority Leader, 1899–1903
- James M. Richardson (politician) (1858–1925), U.S. Representative from Kentucky
- James Richardson (Liberal politician) (1846–1921), Liberal Member of Parliament for Armagh
- James Richardson (political consultant) (born 1984), Republican political strategist
- James Richardson (Massachusetts) (1771–1858), lawyer, businessman, and member of the Massachusetts Senate

== Sports ==
- James Richardson (darts player) (born 1974), English darts player
- James Richardson (footballer) (1885–1951), Scottish footballer for Huddersfield Town, Sheffield Wednesday, and Ayr United
- Jimmy Richardson (1911–1964), English footballer
- James Richardson Spensley (1867–1915), English doctor, footballer and manager, considered to be the father of football in Italy
- James Richardson (sportsman) (1903–1995), English cricketer and rugby union player

== Military ==
- James Cleland Richardson (1895–1916), Canadian bagpiper and recipient of the Victoria Cross
- James L. Richardson (1909–1987), United States Army lieutenant general
- James M. Richardson (general) (born 1960), United States Army lieutenant general
- James O. Richardson (1878–1974), United States Navy admiral

== Others ==
- James Richardson (explorer) (1809–1851), British explorer of the Sahara
- James Richardson (poet) (born 1950), American poet
- James Richardson, owner of Spadina Hotel, Toronto
- James Richardson (presenter) (born 1966), British television presenter associated with Italian football
- James Richardson (1819–1892), Canadian businessman
  - James Richardson & Sons
- Jim Richardson (born 1941), English jazz bassist and session musician
- James Richardson company (1904-1980), Gaspé Peninsula business
- James Richardson Corporation, Australian corporation involved with furniture, hospitality, real estate, and the duty-free retail businesses
- James Armstrong Richardson Sr. (1885–1939), Canadian businessman
- James Joseph Richardson (1935–2023), American man wrongly convicted of the murder of his children
- James Smith Richardson (1883–1970), Scottish architect, antiquarian and archaeologist
- James T. Richardson (born 1941), American sociologist who wrote extensively about new religious movements, popularly called cults
