= Steve Richardson =

Steve Richardson or Steven Richardson may refer to:

- Steve Richardson (footballer) (born 1962), English professional footballer
- Steve Richardson (puzzle designer), founder of Stave Puzzles
- Steve Richardson (ice hockey) (born 1949), Canadian hockey player
- Steve Richardson (politician) (born 1954), American politician
- Steve Richardson (squash player), Irish squash player
- Steven Richardson (golfer), (born 1966), English golfer
- Steven Richardson (physicist), (born 1953), American physicist
- Steven Richardson (Canadian football) (born 1996), American professional Canadian football defensive lineman
- Stephen Richardson (born 1959), Australian rules footballer
