= Frederick Richardson (disambiguation) =

Frederick Richardson (1862–1937) was an American illustrator.

Frederick Richardson may also refer to:

- Frederick Richardson (American cricketer) (1918–1983), American cricketer
- Frederick Richardson (Australian cricketer) (1878–1955), Australian cricketer
