= Thomas Richards =

Thomas Richards may refer to:

- Thomas Richards (priest) (c. 1687–1760), Welsh priest and writer
- Thomas Richards (cricketer) (1855–1923), Australian cricketer
- Thomas Richards (film editor) (1899–1946), American film editor
- Thomas Richards (historian) (1878–1962), Welsh historian, author and librarian
- Thomas Richards (mayor) (born 1943), mayor of Rochester, New York
- Thomas Richards (Tasmania) (1800–1877), Welsh surgeon and journalist who emigrated to Australia
- Thomas Richards (Welsh politician) (1859–1931), Welsh Labour Party Member of Parliament
- Thomas Richards of Coychurch (c. 1710–1790), Welsh curate and lexicographer
- Thomas C. Richards (1930–2020), United States Air Force general
- Thomas R. Richards (born 1947), United States Navy admiral
- Thomas Frederick Richards (1863–1942), British Member of Parliament for Wolverhampton West, 1906–1910
- Thomas Addison Richards (1820–1900), American landscape artist
- Thomas F. Richards, a victim of the Lynchings of Mer Rouge, Louisiana, in 1922

== See also ==
- Tom Richards (disambiguation)
- Thomas Richardson (disambiguation)
- Richards (surname)
