= Anne Richard =

Anne Richard may refer to:

- Anne C. Richard (born 1960), official in the U.S. State Dept.
- Anne Richard (swimmer) (born 1960), Belgian swimmer

== See also ==
- Ann Richards (disambiguation)
