= Attorney General Richardson (disambiguation) =

Elliot Richardson (1920–1999) was Attorney General of the United States. Attorney General Richardson may also refer to:

- Selwyn Richardson (1935–1995), Attorney-General of Trinidad and Tobago
- William P. Richardson (Ohio politician) (1824–1886), Attorney General of Ohio

== See also ==
- General Richardson (disambiguation)
