= Jason Richardson (disambiguation) =

Jason Richardson (born 1981) is an American basketball player.

Jason Richardson may also refer to:

- Jason Richardson (sports personality) (born 1969), Australian radio presenter
- Jason Richardson (BMX racer) (born 1974), American BMX racer
- Jason Richardson (hurdler) (born 1986), American track and field hurdler
- Jason Richardson (musician) (born 1991), American guitarist

== See also ==
- Jase Richardson (born 2005), American basketball player
- Jack Richardson (disambiguation)
- John Richardson (disambiguation)
