= Earl Richardson (disambiguation) =

Earl or Earle Richardson may refer to:

- Earl Richardson (baseball) (1924–2003), American Negro League baseball player
- Earl S. Richardson (1943–2025), American university president
- Earl S. Richardson (politician) (1879–1943), American politician from Mississippi
- Earle Wilton Richardson (1912–1935), American painter
