= Margaret Richardson =

Margaret Richardson may refer to:

- Margaret Richardson (curler), Scottish curler
- Margaret Richardson (lawyer) (1943–2021), American lawyer
- Margaret Bonds (1913–1972), composer and pianist, married name Richardson
- Margaret Foster Richardson (1881–1945), painter

== See also ==
- Margaret Richards (disambiguation)
