= Elizabeth Richardson =

Elizabeth Richardson may refer to:

- Elizabeth Richardson, 1st Lady Cramond (1576/77 – 1651), English writer and peeress
- Elizabeth Richardson, married name Elizabeth Spence Watson (1838–1919), English social reformer and activist
- Liz Richardson (Elizabeth Ann Richardson, 1918–1945), volunteer for the American Red Cross
- Elizabeth Hadley Richardson (1891–1979), wife of Ernest Hemingway

== See also ==
- Richardson (surname)
