= Ian Richards =

Ian Richards may refer to:

- Ian Richards (admiral) (1930–2022), Royal Australian Navy officer, Deputy Chief of Naval Staff 1983–84
- Ian Richards (racewalker) (born 1948), English race walker
- Ian Richards (English cricketer) (born 1957), English cricketer
- Ian Richards (South African cricketer) (born 1965), South African cricketer
- Ian Richards (judge) (born 1975), American judge
- Ian Richards (footballer) (born 1979), English footballer
- Ian Richards (diplomat) British diplomat, ambassador of the United Kingdom to Eritrea 2016–2019

== See also ==
- Ian Richardson (disambiguation)
