= Ralph Richardson (disambiguation) =

Ralph Richardson (1902–1983) was an English actor.

Ralph Richardson may also refer to:

- Ralph Richardson (politician born 1812) (1812–1897), Member of the New Zealand Legislative Council (1853–1856)
- Ralph Richardson (politician born 1848) (1848–1895), Member of the New Zealand Parliament (1871–1873)
- Ralph Richardson (South African cricketer), (born 1963), brother of Dave Richardson
- Ralph Richardson (geologist) (1845–1933), Scottish lawyer and geologist
