= Harry Richardson =

Harry or Harold Richardson may refer to:

- Harry A. Richardson (1853–1928), American businessman and politician in Delaware
- Harold D. Richardson (1902–1993), one-time acting president of Arizona State University
- Harry Linley Richardson (1878–1947), New Zealand artist and stamp designer
- Harold Richardson (cricketer) (1873–?), English cricketer
- Harry Richardson (trade unionist) (1876-1936), English journalist and trade union leader
- Harry Van Buren Richardson (1901–1990), president of Gammon Theological Seminary and the Interdenominational Theological Center
- Harry Richardson (actor) (born 1993), Australian actor
- Harold Richardson (American football) (born 1944), American football coach and executive

== See also ==
- Henry Richardson (disambiguation)
