= Brevoort Houses =

Public housing development in Brooklyn, New York

- NYCHA property
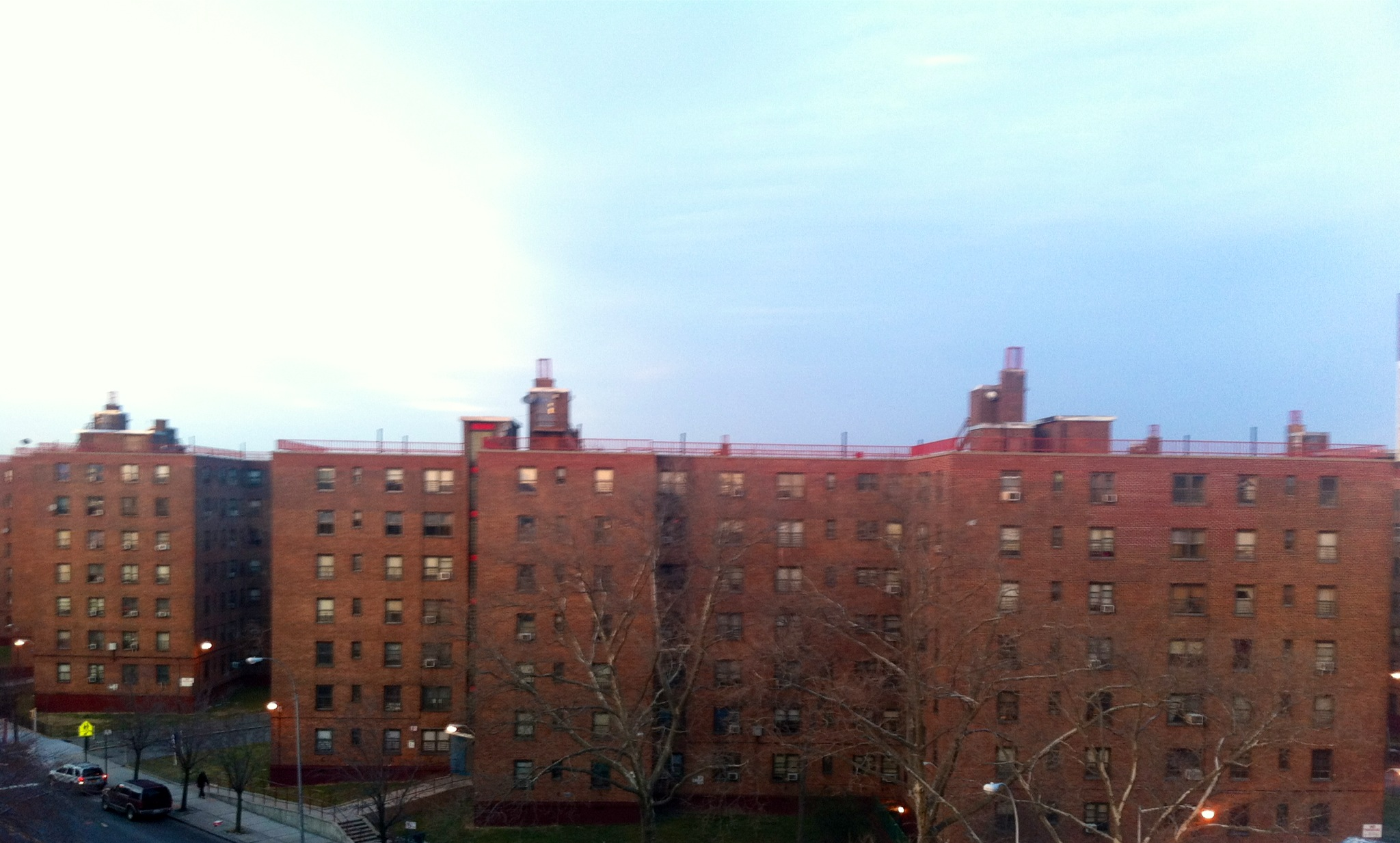
- Brevoort Houses in 2012
- Interactive map of Brevoort Houses
- Coordinates: 40.679330°N 73.922580°W
- Country: United States
- State: New York
- City: New York City
- Borough: Brooklyn
- Construction finished: 1955

Area
  - Total: 0.026 sq mi (0.067 km^{2})

Population
  - Total: 1,973
  - Density: 76,000/sq mi (29,000/km^{2})
- ZIP codes: 11233
- Area codes: 718, 347, 929, and 917
- Website: my.nycha.info/DevPortal/

Brevoort Houses, or Brevoort Projects, are a housing project located in the Bedford-Stuyvestant neighborhood in Brooklyn, New York. The complex is made up of 13 seven-story buildings with 896 apartments. The complex sits on 17.26-acres and construction was completed on August 31, 1955. It is owned and managed by New York City Housing Authority.

The development is located between Bainbridge and Fulton Streets and Ralph and Patchen Avenues. The closest subway lines include the "C" at Ralph Avenue, as well as the "A" and "C" at Utica Avenue.

== Notable residents ==
- Fabolous (born 1977), rapper
- Steven Richardson, physicist

== See also ==
- New York City Housing Authority
- List of New York City Housing Authority properties
