= Walter Richardson =

Walter Richardson may refer to:

- Walter Richardson (cricketer) (1876–1962), Australian cricketer
- Walter Richardson (politician) (1871–1959), Australian politician
- Walter Richardson (swimmer) (born 1943), American swimmer
- Walt Richardson, American singer-songwriter and guitarist
