= Thomas Richardson =

Thomas or Tom Richardson may refer to:

== Politics ==
- Thomas Richardson, 2nd Lord Cramond (1627–1674), English politician
- Thomas Richardson (Hartlepool MP, born 1821) (1821–1890), English manufacturer of marine engines and Liberal (later Liberal Unionist) MP for Hartlepool 1874–1875 and 1880–1890
- Thomas Richardson (Hartlepool MP, born 1846) (1846–1906), English Liberal Unionist politician, MP for Hartlepool 1895–1900
- Thomas Richardson (Labour politician) (1876–1945), British Labour Party politician, MP 1910–1918

== Sports ==
- Thomas Richardson (cricketer) (1865–1923), English cricketer
- Tom Richardson (cricketer) (1870–1912), English cricketer
- Tom Richardson (pinch hitter) (1883–1939), American Major League Baseball player
- T. D. Richardson (Thomas Dow Richardson, 1887–1971), British figure skater
- Tom Richardson (footballer) (1891–?), English footballer
- Tom Richardson (pitcher) (1905-?), Negro league baseball player
- Tom Richardson (American football) (born 1944), American football wide receiver
- Thomas Richardson (wrestler) (born 1956), professional wrestler known by his stage name of Tommy "Wildfire" Rich

== Others ==
- Thomas Richardson (judge) (1569–1635), Lord Chief Justice of England and Wales
- Thomas Richardson (chemist) (1816–1867), English industrial chemist and historian
- Vic Richardson (Australian soldier) (Thomas William Victor Richardson, 1891–1968), World War I Australian soldier and diarist
- Thomas Richardson (cartographer), 18th century Scottish cartographer
- Thomas Richardson (businessman) (1771–1853), investor and director of the Stockton and Darlington Railway and founder of Middlesbrough
- Thomas Miles Richardson (1784–1848), English landscape-painter

== See also ==
- Thomas Richards (disambiguation)
