= Al Richardson =

Al Richardson may refer to:

- Al Richardson (end) (1935–1977), American football player for the Boston Patriots
- Al Richardson (historian) (1941–2003), British Trotskyist historian and activist
- Al Richardson (linebacker) (born 1957), American football linebacker

== See also ==
- Alan Richardson (disambiguation)
- Albert Richardson (disambiguation)
- Alexander Richardson (disambiguation)
- Richardson (surname)
