= Victor Richardson =

Victor or Vic Richardson may refer to:

- Vic Richardson (1894–1969), Australian sportsman
- Victor Richardson (British Army officer) (1895–1917), British soldier
- Vic Richardson (Australian soldier) (1891–1968), Australian soldier
