= Geoff Richardson =

Geoff Richardson may refer to:

- Geoffrey Richardson (musician) (born 1950), English musician
- Geoff Richardson (cricketer) (born 1956), Australian cricketer
- Geoff Richardson (rugby) (born 1949), Australian rugby footballer
- Geoff Richardson (racing driver) (1924–2007), English racing driver

== See also ==
- Jeff Richardson (disambiguation)
