= Jack Richardson =

Jack Richardson may refer to:

- Jack Richardson (actor) (1870–1960), American silent film actor
- Jack Richardson (baseball) (1892–1970), American pitcher
- Jack Richardson (chemical engineer) (1920–2011), British academic best known as a textbook author
- Jack Richardson (footballer, born 1886) (1886–1965), Australian rules footballer
- Jack Richardson (footballer, born 1906) (1906–1993), Australian rules footballer
- Jack Richardson (politician) (1921–2011), Australian politician
- Jack Richardson (record producer) (1929–2011), Canadian record producer
- Jack Richardson (writer) (1934–2012), American playwright

== See also ==
- Jonathan Richardson (disambiguation)
- John Richardson (disambiguation)
