= Keith Richardson =

Keith Richardson may refer to:

- Keith Richardson (chess grandmaster), British Grandmaster in correspondence chess
- Keith Richardson (fighter) (born 1983), American mixed martial artist and bare-knuckle boxer
- Keith Richardson (television executive), British television executive
- Keith Richardson (tennis) (born 1953), American tennis player
