= Charles Richardson (Australian politician) =

Australian politician

Charles Richardson was an Australian politician.

He was one of Charles Cowper's 21 appointments to the New South Wales Legislative Council in May 1861, but did not take his seat. His occupation at the time was described as "gentleman".
