= Don Richardson =

Don Richardson may refer to:

- Don Richardson (musician), American fiddler
- Don Richardson (missionary) (1935–2018), Canadian Christian missionary and author
- Don Richardson (businessman) (1930–2007), British businessman
- Don Richardson (director) (1918–1996), American actor and director
- Don Richardson (arranger) (1928–2008), New Zealand music arranger
- Donald "Duck" Richardson (1935–2011), American basketball coach
