= Andrea Richardson =

American pathologist and physician-scientist

- Born: 1962 (age 63–64)
- Other name: Andrea Lynn Richardson
- Education: University of Texas Southwestern Medical Center
- Scientific career
- Fields: Molecular pathology, breast cancer research
- Workplaces: Harvard Vanguard Medical Associates; Brigham and Women's Hospital; Dana–Farber Cancer Institute; Harvard Medical School; Johns Hopkins School of Medicine
- Thesis: Molecular cloning and characterization of the t(2; 14) translocation associated with childhood CLL (1990)
- Doctoral advisor: Philip W. Tucker

Andrea Lynn Richardson (born 1962) is an American pathologist and physician-scientist specialized in the molecular pathology of breast cancer. She is the Peter and Judy Kovler Professor in Breast Cancer Research and an associate professor of pathology and oncology at the Johns Hopkins School of Medicine. Richardson runs a clinic at the Sibley Memorial Hospital.

== Life ==
Richardson was born in 1962. She earned a Ph.D. and M.D. at the University of Texas Southwestern Medical Center in 1992. Her dissertation was titled, Molecular cloning and characterization of the t(2; 14) translocation associated with childhood CLL. Philip W. Tucker was her doctoral advisor. She was an anatomic pathology staff member in the department of pathology and laboratory medicine at Harvard Vanguard Medical Associates from 1993 to 1997. Richardson completed a residency in anatomic and clinical pathology with subspecialty training in breast cancer pathology and cytopathology at the Brigham and Women's Hospital in 1998.

In 2000, joined the department of cancer biology at the Dana–Farber Cancer Institute and the department of pathology at Brigham and Women's Hospital. She worked in clinical practice in the breast pathology consultation service and in the translational research laboratory where she became an associate professor of pathology at the Harvard Medical School. She specializes in the molecular pathology of breast cancer. In 2015, Richardson joined the Johns Hopkins School of Medicine as the director of pathology and breast pathology in its community practice division. Her clinic is in the Sibley Memorial Hospital and she conducts translational breast cancer research at the Sidney Kimmel Comprehensive Cancer Center. Richardson is an associate professor of pathology and oncology and the Peter and Judy Kovler Professor in Breast Cancer Research.
