= Netkey =

American software company

NCR Netkey, Inc
- Type: Public NYSE: NCR
- Industry: Computer software
- Founded: 1983
- Headquarters: East Haven, Connecticut
- Key people: Dusty Lutz, general manager
- Products: NCR Netkey Software Platform, NCR Netkey Applications, kiosk software, digital signage software, professional services
- Website: www.ncr.com/netkey

Netkey is a company that provides applications and management software for self-service kiosks and digital signage. The Netkey software suite consists of packaged applications, an integrated development environment (IDE) for the assembly of kiosk applications, and server software providing kiosk and digital signage remote monitoring, content management and scheduling, data and usage capture, and reporting. The company also has a professional services group that provides business consulting, software configuration and installation, customization, and application design.

== History ==
Netkey was founded by Alex Richardson in 1983 at Yale University’s Science Park technology incubator. The original name of the company was Lexitech. In 2000, Alex Richardson changed the name of the company from Lexitech to Netkey after raising substantial Venture Capital from five (5) leading institutional venture capital firms. Richardson established Netkey's software development center, its operational management team, recruited both its Board and Advisory Board of Directors, and established its worldwide direct and indirect sales organization. He also established the company's IP (Intellectual Property) program. Richardson is co-holder of two multi-channel technology patents. In 2006, he was inducted into the Kiosk Industry Hall of Fame and in 2007 received the Kioskcom "Kiosk Innovator of the Year" award for his interactive store window innovations. The company has been awarded three patents for technology related to kiosk software. In 2002, the company was named the "premier provider of kiosk software" and the market share and technology leader by industry analysts Frost & Sullivan. In 2007 Netkey acquired Webpavement, a provider of digital signage software. On November 2, 2009, it was announced that NCR Corporation purchased Netkey.

== Notable clients ==
Netkey's customers include:

- Bally Total Fitness
- Big Y
- Toys R Us
- Cabela's
- Carnival Cruise Lines
- Fidelity Investments
- Hot Topic
- Menards
- Pitney Bowes
- Swift Transportation
- Target
- United States Postal Service
