= Scott Richardson =

Scott Richardson may refer to:

- Scott Richardson (cricketer) (born 1977), English cricketer
- Scott Richardson (cyclist) (born 1971), South African cyclist
- Scott Richardson (politician), American politician
- Tony Millionaire (born Scott Richardson in 1956), American cartoonist and author
