= Earle Wilton Richardson =

African-American artist (1912–1935)

- Born: 1912; New York, New York
- Died: December 1935 (aged 22–23); New York, New York
- Education: National Academy of Design
- Known for: Painting

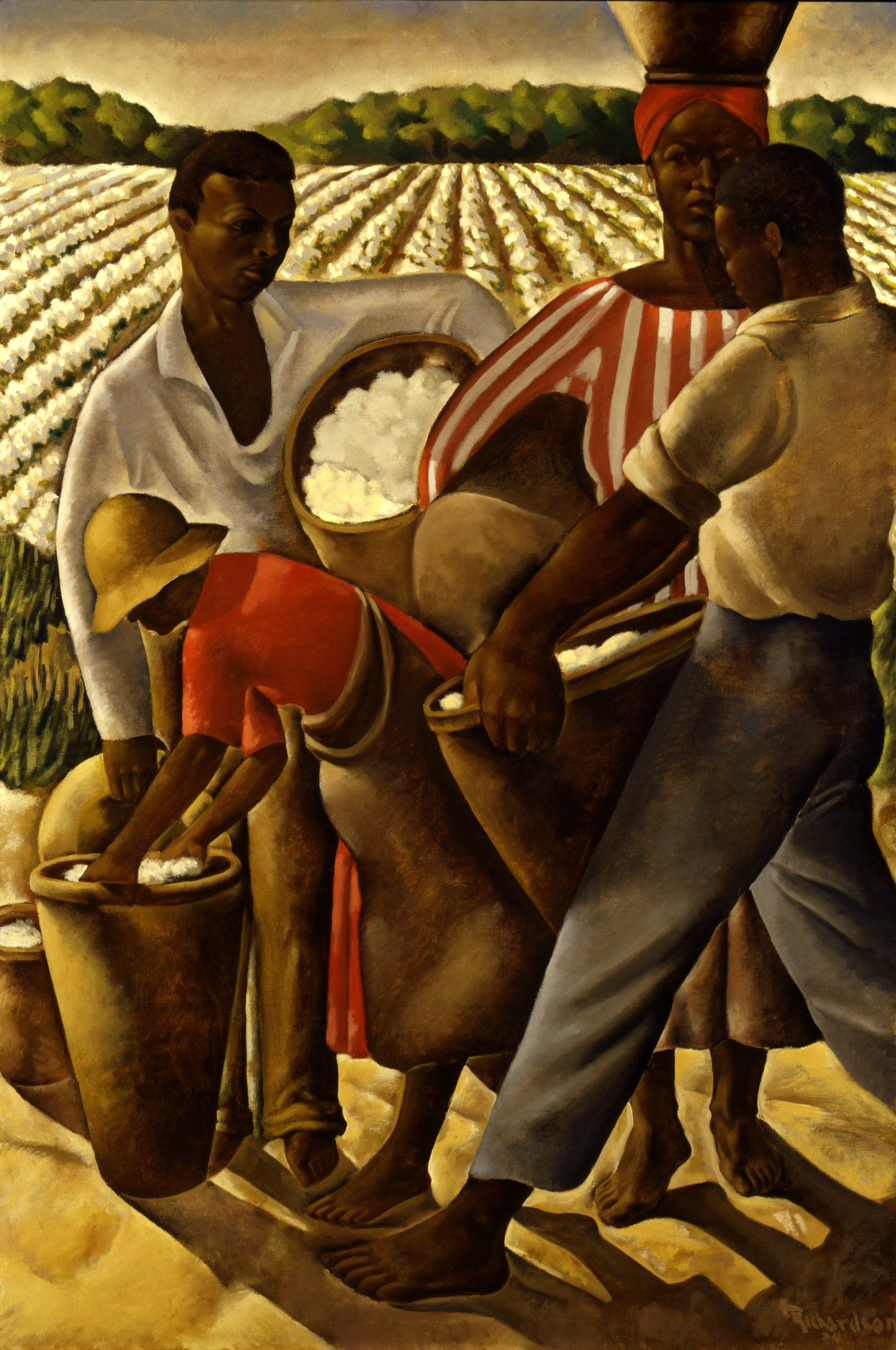
Earle Richardson created the 1934 painting Employment of Negroes in Agriculture for the Public Works of Art Project

Earle Wilton Richardson, (1912–1935) was an African-American artist best known for a 1934 oil painting titled Employment of Negroes in Agriculture, created for the Public Works of Art Project.

The iconic picture (size 48 × 32 inches) depicts two male and two female Black cotton workers, one of them a child, in an unidentified Southern state loading cotton into bales. Like many other American works of art at the time, the painting was commissioned and financed under the New Deal. Richardson committed suicide the following year. He was born and lived in New York City, New York.

He and fellow artist Malvin Gray Johnson planned to elaborate on African American history in a mural series titled Negro Achievement, for the New York Public Library's 135th Street Branch. Both young men died before finishing the project.

"After Johnson's sudden illness and death in November 1934, Richardson continued to work on their mural project. But within a year he too was dead; ill with fever and heart-broken over the death of Johnson, who had been his lover, Richardson leapt from his fourth-floor apartment window and died of his injuries in December 1935."

== Works ==
- Profile of a Negro Girl, 1932
- Benjamin Banneker, 1934
- Columbus Soldiers—Estavanico, 1934
- Employment of Negroes in Agriculture, 1934

== Bibliography ==
- Alejandro Anreus, Diana L. Linden, Jonathan Weinberg (Editors), The Social and the Real: Political Art of the 1930s in the Western Hemisphere, Penn State Press, 2005, ISBN 978-0-271-02691-6
