= Alan Richardson =

Alan, Allan, or Allen Richardson may refer to:

== Sportspeople ==
- Alan Richardson (boxer) (born 1948), English boxer
- Alan Richardson (cricketer) (born 1975), English cricketer
- Allen Richardson (cricketer) (1926–1998), English cricketer
- Alan Richardson (footballer, born 1940) (1940–2015), known as Bull Richardson, Australian rules footballer for Richmond and South Melbourne
- Alan Richardson (footballer, born 1965), Australian rules coach of St Kilda and former Collingwood footballer

== Musicians ==
- Alan Richardson (composer) (1904–1978), Scottish pianist and composer
- Allen Richardson, musician in A Band Called Pain
- Allen Richardson, musician in The Natural Four

== Others ==
- Alan Richardson (priest) (1905–1975), Dean of York
- Allan Richardson, photographer on Seeking the Magic Mushroom

== See also ==
- Al Richardson (disambiguation)
