= Samuel Richardson (disambiguation) =

Samuel Richardson was an 18th-century English novelist and printer.

Sam or Samuel Richardson may also refer to:

- Samuel T. Richardson (1857–1921), American attorney and educator
- Sam Richardson (actor) (born 1984), American film actor
- Sam Richardson (artist) (1934–2013), American post-war artist and art educator
- Samuel Richardson (cricketer) (1844–1938), English cricketer
- Samuel Richardson (Baptist), English layman and religious controversialist of the 1640s and 1650s
- Sam Richardson (athlete) (1917–1989), Canadian sprinter and long jumper
- Garnet Richardson (1933–2016), Canadian curler known as Sam
- Samuel Richardson (High Sheriff) (1738–?), justice of the peace and High Sheriff of Gloucestershire in 1787 and Glamorganshire in 1798
