= George Richardson (cricketer) =

Australian cricketer

Personal information
- Born: 28 May 1834; Bathurst, New South Wales, Australia
- Died: 1 May 1911 (aged 76); Dandaloo, New South Wales, Australia
- Source: ESPNcricinfo, 17 January 2017

George Richardson (28 May 1834 – 1 May 1911) was an Australian cricketer. He played two first-class matches for New South Wales between 1859/60 and 1860/61.

== See also ==
- List of New South Wales representative cricketers
