= Arthur Charles Jeston Richardson =

Australian cyclist and mining engineer

Arthur Charles Jeston Richardson (23 February 1872 – 3 April 1939) was an Australian cyclist and mining engineer, who became the first person to circumnavigate the continent of Australia on a bicycle.

== Early life and career ==
S'sRichardson was born on 23 February 1872 at Pernambuco (Recife), Brazil, one of ten children. The family moved to Port Augusta, South Australia, while Arthur was very young. He attended Whinham College and Adelaide Collegiate School. After becoming a mining engineer, Richardson traveled the Australian gold fields looking for new strikes.

Richardson decided to become the first cyclist to cross the stiflingly hot Nullarbor Plain. On 24 November 1896, Richardson left Coolgardie for Adelaide by bicycle. Carrying only a small kit and a water-bag, he followed the telegraph line, as he crossed the Nullarbor. He later described the heat as "1,000 degrees in the shade". He successfully completed the journey, arriving in Adelaide thirty-one days later. As the first man to pedal the Nullarbor, Richardson's ride was widely reported in Australian newspapers and periodicals of the day.

== Circumnavigating Australia ==
In 1899 Richardson set out to be the first to ride round the Australian continent. He left Perth on 5 June 1899, heading north, carrying 25 pounds (11 kg) of gear and a pistol. Heavy rain slowed his progress in Western Australia, and later in the north, where the black-soil plains were unrideable for several days. He had to push and carry his bicycle through sand and silt, encountering difficult interactions with some Indigenous Australians along the way. He arrived back in Perth on 4 February 1900 after travelling about 11,500 miles (18,500 km). Richardson's ride coincided with similar attempts by other Australian cyclists, as he finished ahead of three other Australian cyclists – Alex and Frank White, as well as Donald Mackay, who were simultaneously attempting to circumnavigate the continent in a counter-clockwise direction from Brisbane.

== Later life ==
Richardson later moved to South Africa, where he served three years with the South Australian militia before joining the 3rd (Bushmen's) Contingent, Victorian Mounted Rifle Regiment of Western Australia, destined for the Boer War. He left Fremantle, Western Australia on 13 March 1900 with a bicycle donated by a local agent for use as a dispatch rider. The contingent disembarked at Beira, Mozambique on 18 April. In June 1900 Richardson was discharged from military service at Marandellas, near Salisbury, Rhodesia, after breaking his arm.

Richardson worked briefly in West Africa. He married Gwendolyn Bedwell, and moved to Chile where he worked as a mining engineer. The couple had one son while living in Chile, James Herbert. Richardson was badly wounded in World War I and spent two years in hospital at Rouen, France. He later divorced, and moved to England to work as an engineer. On 26 July 1934 he married an English widow, Rita Betsy Elliott-Druiff. The couple settled in Scarborough, North Yorkshire. Richardson died on 3 April 1939 at his home in Scarborough, North Yorkshire of a self-inflicted gunshot wound, after first shooting his wife. He was survived by James, his son from his first marriage who had remained in Chile.

== Bibliography ==
- Fitzpatrick, Jim, The Bicycle and the Bush: a study of the bicycle in rural Australia, Melbourne: Oxford University Press (1980)
- Fitzpatrick, Jim, Richardson, Arthur Charles Jeston (1872–1939), Australian Dictionary of Biography, Volume 11, Melbourne University Press (1988)
- Richardson, Arthur C.J., The Story of a Remarkable Ride, The Dunlop Tyre Co. Of Australia (1900)
