= Gary Richardson =

Gary Richardson may refer to:

- Gary Richardson (Arizona politician), member of the Arizona State Senate, 1995–1999
- Gary Richardson (Georgia politician), member of the Georgia House of Representatives
- Gary Richardson (New Hampshire politician), member of the New Hampshire House of Representatives
- Gary Richardson (lawyer) (born 1941), American lawyer and political candidate in Oklahoma
- Gary Richardson (American football) (1935–2002), American football coach and player

== See also ==
- Garry Richardson, British radio presenter
