= Dick Richardson =

Dick Richardson may refer to:

- Dick Richardson (boxer) (1934–1999), Welsh heavyweight boxer
- Dick Richardson (cricketer) (born 1934), English Test cricketer
- President Dick Richardson, a fictional character and the main antagonist of the video game Fallout 2

== See also ==
- Richard Richardson (disambiguation)
