= Charles Parks Richardson =

American physician

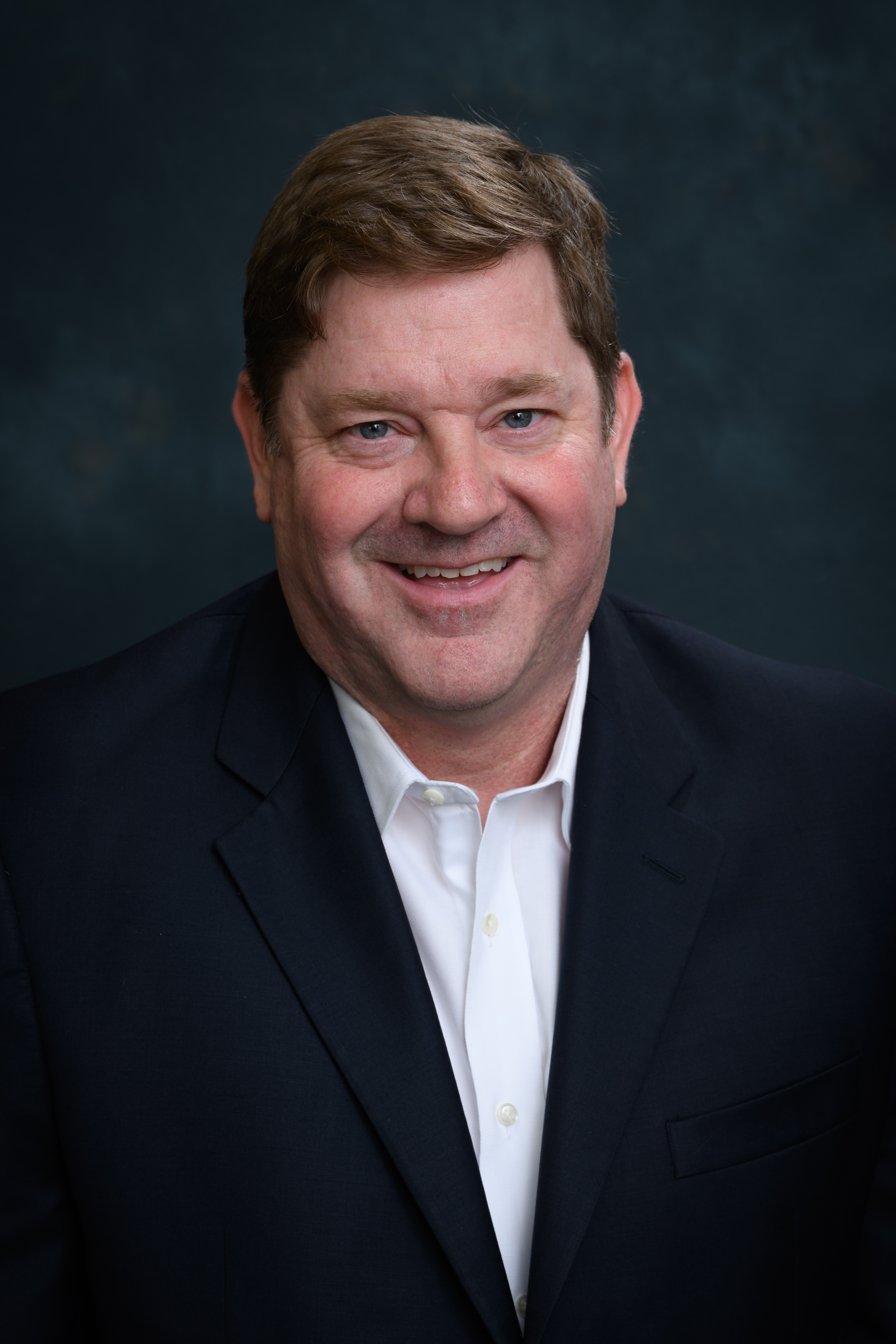
- Born: July 5, 1971 (age 55)
- Education: Winston-Salem State University, Moore School of Business

Charles Parks Richardson (born July 5, 1971) is an American doctor, inventor, and serial entrepreneur.

== Education ==
Richardson received a B.S. degree in chemistry from Winston-Salem State University in Winston-Salem, North Carolina. He has an M.D. degree from Central America Health Sciences University School of Medicine. He holds an MBA from the University of South Carolina's Moore School of Business.

== Career ==
Richardson co-founded the company Cleveland Heart in January 2007. The company's medical technology focuses on total heart replacement and ventricular assist devices,

Richardson co-founded IntelliServices Inc. and was its CEO in January 2000. The company offers remote electronic medical records. Its product CareLink allowed medical providers to wireless monitor implanted medical devices via the Internet. The company was sold and is now owned by Medtronic.

In 2004, Richardson founded TransWorld Med, and is the chairman.

In 2007, Richardson founded TransWorld Kidney Corporation.

Richardson has been elected as a board member of the Society for Disaster Medicine and Public Health. He is CEO of Critical Medical Infrastructure (CMI), KRS Global Biotechnology, and GeneRx. He co-founded Cleveland Heart and Intelliservices Inc., focusing on heart replacement technologies and remote medical device monitoring. Richardson's work includes developing an Inventory Management supply chain module within ViiMed.

Richardson joined the Center for Computational Quantum Chemistry (CCQC) as a "Distinguished Technology and Science Advisor" working with the CCQC, School of Pharmacy, and the school of Public Health at the University of Georgia.

== Inventions ==
Richardson created IntelliPhysician, a piece of software based on the same paperless principles as IntelliHeart, but handles a wider range of business-related processes, such as scheduling, accounts receivable, financial history, and billing. The software also processes insurance claim forms and gathers and stores patients’ clinical data, including procedure and diagnosis history, email, hospital rounds information, and referring physician information. The company behind IntelliPhysician was acquired in 2006 by H-Quotient Inc. of Vienna, VA for $7.6m.

One of TransWorld Heart Corp.'s inventions is the Soul Mate. This product is an implantable device that can replace routine post-transplant heart biopsies. The Soul Mate was the first device to offer remote monitoring of congestive heat failure and allows physicians to track a patient's condition from home.

In 2007 Richardson developed the SideKick, a system for real-time monitoring of a kidney after a transplant.
