= Len Richardson (cricketer) =

Australian cricketer (born 1950)

Personal information
- Full name: Leonard Martin Richardson
- Born: 5 May 1950 (age 76); Sydney, Australia
- Source: ESPNcricinfo, 19 January 2017

Len Richardson (born 5 May 1950) is an Australian cricketer. He played eight first-class matches for New South Wales and Queensland between 1975/76 and 1976/77.

== See also ==
- List of New South Wales representative cricketers
