= Ian Richardson (disambiguation) =

Ian Richardson (1934 – 2007) was a Scottish actor.

Ian Richardson may also refer to:

- Ian Richardson (Australian footballer) (born 1987), Australian rules football player
- Ian Richardson (footballer, born 1964), English football (soccer) player
- Ian Richardson (footballer, born 1970), English football (soccer) player and manager

== See also ==
- Ian Richards (disambiguation)
