= Margaret Richards (architect) =

Scottish architect (1928–2022)

- Born: Margaret Brown; 3 November 1928
- Died: 20 February 2022 (aged 93)
- Occupation: Architect

Margaret Richards (née Brown; 3 November 1928 – 20 February 2022) was a Scottish architect.

== Early life and education ==
She was born in Fort William on 3 November 1928, the daughter of a civil engineer. When her father was appointed to a new job in London, she began attending Kingston School of Architecture from the age of 16.

== Career ==
She graduated in 1952 and began working for the practice of Powell & Moya, in particular on new housing developments in Westminster, London; her former tutor, Philip Powell, described her as the ‘Drainage Queen of Pimlico’. Two years later she joined the Edinburgh office of Robert Matthew (which later became RMJM), working on projects including Crombie Hall at the University of Aberdeen.

Margaret Brown married fellow architect John Richards in 1958 and they had four children. She continued to work at RMJM part-time while her children were young. She later set up her own practice and then worked with her husband’s firm, John Richards Associates, and was a tutor at Edinburgh College of Art.

Margaret Richards was a council member of the Scottish Special Housing Association, and a founding trustee and former chairman of the Lothian Building Preservation Trust, and she also served on the Historic Buildings Council for Scotland, the Advisory Committee on Artistic Matters of the Church of Scotland, and the ICOMOS International Committee for Training.

Margaret Richards died in Edinburgh on 20 February 2022 at the age of 93.

== Recognition ==
In 2014 she received a Lifetime Achievement Award from the Royal Incorporation of Architects in Scotland (RIAS) for her "outstanding contribution to architecture".
