= Governor Richardson =

Governor Richardson may refer to:

- Bill Richardson (1947-2023), 30th Governor of New Mexico
- Friend Richardson (1865–1943), 25th Governor of California
- James Burchill Richardson (1770–1836), 41st Governor of South Carolina
- John Peter Richardson II (1801–1864), 59th Governor of South Carolina
- John Peter Richardson III (1831–1899), 83rd Governor of South Carolina, son of John Peter Richardson II.
- William Alexander Richardson (1811–1875), 5th Governor of Nebraska Territory

== See also ==
- John Richardson (colonial administrator) (1679–1742), Deputy Governor of Anguilla from 1735 until 1741
- William Richardson (colonial administrator) (fl. 1800s–1820s), Deputy Governor of Anguilla from 1805 until 1829
