= Joe M. Richardson =

American history professor & author (died 2015)

Joe Martin Richardson (died 2015) was an American emeritus professor of history and author who wrote about Florida's history. He was a history professor at Florida State University from 1964 until 2006.

He grew up in Stella, Missouri. He graduated from Southwest Missouri State University in 1958. He earned his master's and doctorate degrees from Florida State University. He was an assistant professor at the University of Mississippi. He became friends with James Meredith, an African American student who enrolled there.

He was married to Patricia Richardson. His daughter Leslie Richardson directs the Center for the Advancement of Teaching at Florida International University. His son Andrew Richardson became a chef.

== Writings ==
=== Books ===
- The Negro in the Reconstruction of Florida, 1865–1877 Florida State University (1965)
- Talladega College, The First Century, co-authored with Maxine Jones
- The Trial and Imprisonment of Jonathan Walker (1974)
- A History of Fisk University, 1865–1946 (1980)
- African Americans in the Reconstruction of Florida, 1865–1877 University of Alabama Press (2008)
- Christian Reconstruction: The American Missionary Association and Southern Blacks, 1861–1890 University of Alabama Press (2009)
- Education for Liberation: The American Missionary Association and African Americans from 1890 to the Civil Rights Movement (2009), co-authored with Maxine Jones

=== Articles ===
- "An Evaluation of the Freedmen's Bureau in Florida" (1963)
- "Florida Black Codes"
- "Florida's Freedmen's Bureau during Reconstruction, 1865–1872" April 8, 2015

== See also ==
- Canter Brown Jr., historian of similar subjects in Florida
- Larry E. Rivers, historian of similar subjects in Florida
