= Frederick Richardson (American cricketer) =

American cricketer (1918–1983)

Personal information
- Full name: Frederick Fales Richardson
- Born: August 2, 1918; Rockland, Maine, USA
- Died: July 9, 1983 (aged 64); Bombay, Maharashtra, India
- Batting: Left-handed
- Bowling: Slow left-arm orthodox
- Role: All-rounder

Domestic team information
- Years: Team
- 1943–1948: Madras

Career statistics
Competition	First-class
Matches	11
Runs scored	362
Batting average	21.29
100s/50s	0/2
Top score	64
Balls bowled	654
Wickets	6
Bowling average	42.83
5 wickets in innings	0
10 wickets in match	0
Best bowling	2/46
Catches/stumpings	4/–
- Source: ESPNcricinfo, November 5, 2022

Frederick Fales Richardson (August 2, 1918 – July 9, 1983) was an American cricketer who played 11 first-class matches for the Madras provincial cricket team.

== Early life ==
Frederick Richardson was born in Rockland, Maine on August 2, 1918. At the age of two, Richardson migrated with his parents to England where he did his schooling at Westminster School and graduated from Princeton University. Frederick Richardson moved to Calcutta, India in 1941 and worked for Stanvac (Standard Vacuum). In 1944, Richardson migrated to Madras and then to Bombay, where he died in 1983.

== Sporting career ==
Frederick Richardson learned cricket during his school days in England. He played for the Madras cricket team under the captaincy of C. P. Johnstone from 1944 to 1948. He also played football during his three-year stay in Calcutta.
