= Hugh Richardson =

Hugh Richardson may refer to:

- Hugh Richardson (shipowner) (1784–1870), Canadian businessman and first harbourmaster of Toronto
- Hugh Richardson (magistrate) (1826–1913), Canadian magistrate who sentenced Louis Riel to hang
- Hugh Edward Richardson (1905–2000), British diplomat and Tibetologist
