= Steven Richardson (physicist) =

Physicist and professor at Howard University

Steven L. Richardson
- Born: July 22, 1953 (age 73); Brooklyn, New York
- Education: Ohio State University
- Scientific career
- Thesis: [ProQuest 303192093 Part I: Numerical Investigation of the RKKY Interaction in a BCS Superconductor; Part II: Dynamical Analysis of Leed from the (110) Surfaces of Sustitionally Disordered Gallium(X)Aluminum(1-X)Arsenide] (1983)
- Doctoral advisor: Bruce R. Patton

Steven Leslie Richardson (born July 22, 1953) is an American physicist and professor of electrical engineering. He is currently a professor emeritus at Howard University, a co-principal investigator in the National Science Foundation Science and Technology Center for Integrated Quantum Materials, and a Faculty Associate in Applied Physics in the John A. Paulson School of Engineering and Applied Sciences at Harvard University.

He is recognized for his research contributions to computational materials science and computational chemistry.

== Early life and education ==
Steven Leslie Richardson was born on July 22, 1953, in Brooklyn, New York, to Edward Alfred Richardson and Juanita Pearl Richardson. One of five children, he grew up in the Brevoort Houses in Bedford-Stuyvesant. Edward Richardson was a subway conductor and Juanita Richardson was a nurse. He attended Brooklyn Preparatory High School for his secondary education.

He attended Columbia University as a National Achievement Scholar studying chemistry. Richardson subsequently earned a master's degree in 1981 and a Ph.D. in 1983 from the Ohio State University, both degrees in theoretical condensed matter physics. Richardson transferred to Ohio State from the Massachusetts Institute of Technology with his graduate advisor, Bruce Patton. Evelynn Hammonds, Sylvester James Gates and Reynold Verret were fellow students of Richardson's at MIT, and while there, Shirley Ann Jackson encouraged him to switch his concentration to condensed matter physics.

During his doctoral studies, Richardson held a position as an IBM Minority Graduate Fellow and a Xerox Graduate Fellow. While working at Xerox, he and his advisor, Charles B. Duke, discovered a new reconstructed semiconductor surface GaAs(110) for GaAs.

== Career ==
Following his doctoral studies, Richardson completed a Chancellor's Distinguished Postdoctoral Fellowship at the University of California, Berkeley, and was also a Ford Foundation Postdoctoral Fellow at Lawrence Berkeley National Laboratory. At UC Berkeley he worked under Marvin L. Cohen. From 1986 to 1988, he was a program director for the Condensed Matter Theory Program of the National Science Foundation and as a senior research scientist at the Eastman Kodak Company.

He then joined the faculty of Howard University, serving as the associate director of the Materials Research Center for Excellence from 1989 to 1994. Concurrently, between 1989 and 1995 he was also an associate professor of electrical engineering at Howard. In 1995 he was promoted to full professor.

Richardson has also served as a visiting professor and a visiting scientist at numerous universities throughout his career, including Iowa State University; Bradley University; the Instituto Superior Técnico in Lisbon, Portugal; Emory University; and the Center for Computational Materials Science at the U.S. Naval Research Laboratory. He was the Dr. Martin Luther King, Jr. Visiting Professor of Chemistry at the Massachusetts Institute of Technology from 2016 to 2017. He has been a member of numerous professional organizations including the American Physical Society, American Chemical Society and the American Association for the Advancement of Science.

== Awards ==
- Career Advancement Award by the National Science Foundation (1992)
- Howard University Faculty Senate Award for Exemplary Teaching (2013)
- Fellow of the American Association for the Advancement of Science (2022)
- Sigma Xi Distinguished Lecturer (2022–2024)

== Research ==
Richardson's research has centered around computational materials science and computational chemistry, including the use of supercomputers to calculate the structural, electronic and vibrational properties of molecules. His work has been supported by funding from institutions including the Office of Naval Research, U.S. Department of Energy, W. M. Keck Foundation, Boeing Corporation, and the National Science Foundation.
