= Ann Richards (disambiguation) =

Ann Richards (1933–2006) was an American politician and the 45th Governor of Texas.

Ann or Anne Richards may also refer to:

- Ann Richards (actress) (1917–2006), Australian actress
- Ann Richards (singer) (1935–1982), American jazz singer
- Anne Richards (born 1964/65), chief executive officer of Fidelity International

== See also ==
- Anne Richard (disambiguation)
