= Charles Richardson (Essex cricketer) =

English cricketer

Charles Richardson (23 March 1885 — 5 April 1948) was an English cricketer. He was a left-handed batsman who played first-class cricket for Essex. He was born in Terling and died in Great Totham.

Having made a single Minor Counties Championship appearance for the Second XI in June 1914, Richardson made his first and only first-class appearance the following week, against Yorkshire. Playing in just one innings of the game, Richardson scored 15 runs.

Between this point and the end of the season, Richardson picked up four further first-class appearances.
