= Simon Richardson =

Simon Richardson may refer to:

- Simon Richardson (English cyclist) (born 1983), English racing cyclist
- Simon Richardson (Welsh cyclist) (born 1966), Welsh racing cyclist

== See also ==
- Simone Richardson (born 1973), Dutch politician
