= Joseph Richardson (cricketer) =

Australian cricketer

Personal information
- Born: 28 February 1878; Kooringa, Australia
- Died: 13 June 1951 (aged 73)
- Source: Cricinfo, 25 September 2020

Joseph Richardson (28 February 1878 – 13 June 1951) was an Australian cricketer. He played in two first-class matches for South Australia in 1905/06.

== See also ==
- List of South Australian representative cricketers
