= General Richardson =

General Richardson may refer to:

- Cecil R. Richardson (born c. 1947), U.S. Air Force major general
- Charles Leslie Richardson (1908–1994), British Army general
- Duke Richardson (1980s–2020s), U.S. Air Force lieutenant general
- George Richardson (Indian Army officer) (1847–1931), British Indian Army lieutenant general
- George Spafford Richardson (1868–1938), New Zealand Military Forces major general
- Israel B. Richardson (1815–1862), U.S. Army major general
- James M. Richardson (general) (born 1960), U.S. Army lieutenant general
- James L. Richardson (1909–1987), U.S. Army lieutenant general
- John Richardson (Australian Army officer) (1880–1954), Australian Army major general
- John Richardson (Canadian MP) (1932–2010), Canadian Forces brigadier general
- John B. Richardson (1990s–2020s), U.S. Army major general
- John Soame Richardson (1836–1896), British Army major general
- Laura J. Richardson (born 1963), U.S. Army lieutenant general
- Robert Richardson (British Army officer) (1929–2014), British Army lieutenant general
- Robert C. Richardson III (1918–2011), U.S. Air Force brigadier general
- Robert C. Richardson Jr. (1882–1954), U.S. Army four-star general
- Robert V. Richardson (1820–1870), Confederate States Army brigadier general
- Tony Richardson (British Army officer) (1922–2015), British Army major general
- Wilds P. Richardson (1861–1929), U.S. Army brigadier general
- William P. Richardson (Ohio politician) (1824–1886), Union Army brevet brigadier general

== See also ==
- Attorney General Richardson (disambiguation)
