= Marcus Richardson (gridiron football) =

American gridiron football player (born 1984)

Profile
- Position: Linebacker

Personal information
- Born: September 30, 1984 (age 42); Pensacola, Florida
- Listed height: 6 ft 0 in (1.83 m)
- Listed weight: 235 lb (107 kg)

Career information
- College: Troy
- NFL draft: 2008: undrafted

Career history
- Houston Texans (2008); Indianapolis Colts (2008)*; BC Lions (2009)*
- * Offseason or practice squad member only

Marcus Richardson (born September 11, 1984) is a former professional American and Canadian football free agent linebacker. He was signed as an undrafted free agent by the Houston Texans in 2008. He played college football for the Troy Trojans.

Richardson has also been a member of the Indianapolis Colts.
