= Ernest Richardson =

Ernest Richardson may refer to:

- Ernest Cushing Richardson (1860–1939), American librarian and theologian
- Ernest Frank Richardson (1871–1952), British constable
- Ernie Richardson (curler) (born 1931), Canadian curler
- Ernie Richardson (footballer) (Ernest William Richardson, 1916–1977), British footballer
- E. L. Richardson (sports executive) (c. 1875–1952, Ernest Lamont Richardson), Canadian businessman and sports executive
