= Jane Richardson =

Jane Richardson may refer to:

- Jane Richardson (author) (1919–2018), American author
- Jane S. Richardson (born 1941), American biochemist
