= Susan Richardson (disambiguation) =

Susan Richardson (born 1952) is an American actress.

Susan Richardson may also refer to:

- Susan Richardson (swimmer) (born 1955), English swimmer
- Susan Richardson (Underground Railroad) (1810–1904), escaped slave and church co-founder
- Susan D. Richardson, American chemist
- Susan Smith Richardson, American journalist and editor

== See also ==
- Sue Richardson, English jazz singer and musician
- Sue Richardson (economist) (born 1946), Australian economist and academic
