= Justice Richardson =

Justice Richardson may refer to:

- Frank K. Richardson (1914–1999), associate justice of the Supreme Court of California
- John Crowley Richardson (1819–1860), associate justice of the Supreme Court of Missouri
- Robert A. Richardson (died 1895), associate justice of the Virginia Supreme Court of Appeals
- William M. Richardson, chief justice of the New Hampshire Supreme Court.
- Thomas Richardson (judge) (1569–1635), chief justice of the Common Pleas and chief justice of the King's Bench
- William S. Richardson (1919–2010), chief justice of the Hawaiʻi State Supreme Court

== See also ==
- Judge Richardson (disambiguation)
