= Herbert Richardson =

Herbert Richardson may refer to:

- Herbert Richardson (rower) (1903–1982), Canadian rower
- Herbert Richardson (RAF officer) (1898–1922), World War I flying ace
- Herbert Richardson (politician), American politician
- Herbert Richardson (publisher) (born 1932), American publisher
- Herbert A. Richardson (1852–1942), timber baron, shipping magnate, and pioneer of Sonoma County, California

== See also ==
- Bert Richardson (disambiguation)
