= Andrew Richardson =

Andrew Richardson may refer to:

- Andrew Richardson (Jamaican cricketer) (born 1981), West Indian cricketer
- Andrew Richardson (judoka) (born 1955), Australian Olympic judoka
- Andrew Richardson (tennis) (born 1974), British tennis player
- Andy Richardson (sports correspondent), sports presenter/correspondent for Al Jazeera English
- Andy Richardson (writer), British writer
