= Tim Richardson =

Tim Richardson may refer to:

- Tim Richardson (writer), author and confectionery historian
- Tim Richardson (politician) (born 1988), Australian politician
