= Jeff Richardson =

Jeff Richardson may refer to:

- Jeff Richardson (infielder) (born 1965), Major League Baseball infielder
- Jeff Richardson (pitcher) (born 1963), baseball pitcher
- Jeff Richardson (cricketer), former Bermudian cricketer
- Jeff Richardson (American football) (born 1944), American football player

== See also ==
- Geoff Richardson (disambiguation)
