= Arthur Richardson (footballer, born 1928) =

Australian rules footballer

Personal information
- Born: 4 April 1928
- Died: 15 March 2001 (aged 72)
- Height: 173 cm (5 ft 8 in)
- Weight: 76 kg (168 lb)

Playing career^{1}
Years	Club	Games (Goals)
1949	South Melbourne	5 (1)
- ^{1} Playing statistics correct to the end of 1949.

Arthur Clarence Richardson (4 April 1928 – 15 March 2001) was an Australian rules footballer who played for the South Melbourne Football Club in the Victorian Football League (VFL).
