= Charles S. Richardson =

President of Madison Normal School, d. 1904

- Died: June 24, 1904; Omaha, Nebraska, U.S.
- Education: Colby College; Harvard in chemistry and mineralogy
- Spouse: Edith May Adams
- Parent(s): Susan M. B. Richardson; Isaac E.
- Relatives: Charles Francis Adams (Brother-In-Law)

Charles Sumner Richardson (c. 1854 or 1855 – 1904) was the first president of South Dakota's normal school, Madison Normal, that later became Dakota State University.

Richardson was born to Issac E. and Susan M. B. Richardson about 1854 in Hartford, Maine, where he grew up. He attended the nearby Colby College in Waterville, Maine where he graduated in 1883; whereupon he took the job of organizing the newly created Madison Normal School in South Dakota. He was president of the school from 1883 to 1887. In 1884 he married Edith May Adams. Richardson was succeeded as president by William F. Gorrie of Watertown, South Dakota, who assumed office in September 1887.

After leaving Madison, Richardson took graduate course work at Harvard in chemistry and mineralogy, followed by accepting appointment at Olivet College in Olivet, Michigan where he briefly was a professor of mathematics and physics. In 1891 he moved to Salt Lake City due to his interest in mining. He became involved with a number of mines in the Bingham Canyon mining district, notably the Old Jordan and South Galena mines. In 1895, he moved to Anaconda, Montana where with a Mr. Olson, Richardson together with his brother-in-law, Charles Francis Adams, ran a merchantile, supplying clothes and other dry goods to the miners. In 1899, he and his brother-in-law returned to Salt Lake City and opened the firm of Richardson & Adams. Richardson & Adams primarily ran an upscale clothing store (clothier) in downtown Salt Lake City, but it still also held a number of mining claims.

The Richardson Hall dorm at Dakota State was named after him in 1970. He died on June 24, 1904, in Omaha, Nebraska, and was buried in the Mount Olivet Cemetery, in Salt Lake City, Utah.
