= Norman Richardson =

Norman Richardson may refer to:

- Norman Richardson (basketball) (born 1979), American basketball player
- Norman Richardson (footballer) (1915–1991), English footballer
- Norm Richardson (footballer) (1882–1949), Australian rules footballer
