= Derek Richardson =

Derek Richardson may refer to:

- Derek Richardson (actor) (born 1976), American actor
- Derek Richardson (footballer) (born 1956), English footballer
