= Arthur Richardson (footballer, born 1880) =

Australian rules footballer

Personal information
- Full name: Arthur George Ernest Richardson
- Born: 9 March 1880
- Died: 10 February 1951 (aged 70)
- Height: 171 cm (5 ft 7 in)
- Weight: 69 kg (152 lb)

Playing career^{1}
Years	Club	Games (Goals)
1898	St Kilda	3 (0)
- ^{1} Playing statistics correct to the end of 1898.

Arthur George Ernest Richardson (9 March 1880 – 10 February 1951) was an Australian rules footballer who played for the St Kilda Football Club in the Victorian Football League (VFL).
