= Kate Richardson =

Kate or Katie Richardson may refer to:

- Kate Richardson (gymnast) (born 1984), Canadian gymnast
- Kate Richardson (cyclist) (born 2002), Scottish cyclist
- Katie Richardson (born 1988), Australian beauty pageant winner
- Kate Richardson (athlete) (born 1973), Australian long-distance runner
- Kate Richardson (swimmer) in Swimming at the 2006 Commonwealth Games – Women's 200 metre freestyle

== See also ==
- Kate Richardson-Walsh (born 1980), English field hockey player
- Katherine Richardson (disambiguation)
