= Anthony Richardson =

Anthony Richardson may refer to:

== Sports ==
- Anthony Richardson (American football) (born 2002), American football player
- Anthony Richardson (basketball) (born 1983), American basketball player
- Anthony Richardson (boxer) (born 1947), Dutch boxer

== Others ==
- Anthony Richardson (writer) (1899–1964), British author

== See also ==
- Antoan Richardson (born 1983), Bahamian-American baseball player and coach
- Antonio Richardson (born 1992), American football offensive lineman
- Tony Richardson (disambiguation)
