= Joseph Richardson (flautist) =

English flautist

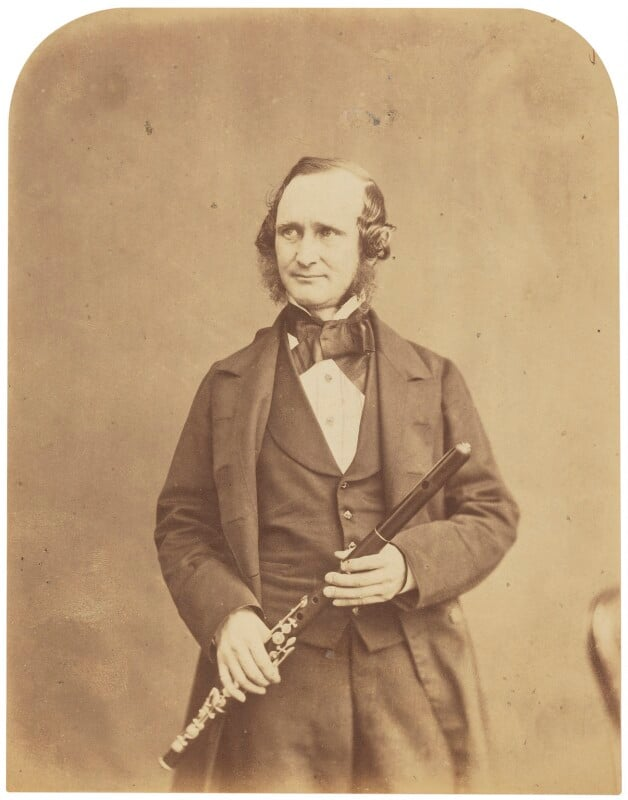
- Photo by Herbert Watkins
- Born: 1814; London , England
- Died: 22 March 1862 (aged 47–48); London, England
- Occupation: Flautist

Joseph Richardson (1814 – 22 March 1862) was an English flautist.

== Biography ==
Richardson was born in London in 1814. He studied the flute under Charles Nicholson. Richardson attended the royal academy of music from January 1835 to June 1836, succeeding Nicholson as professor of the flute at that institution in 1837. He became the popular solo flautist of his day. For many years he was the chief attraction at Louis-Antoine Jullien's promenade concerts, but, in consequence of unfair treatment, he left Jullien and became principal flautist, at a small salary, in the queen's band. He died in London on 22 March 1862. Richardson practised literally ‘all day and every day’ (Rockstro), and attained an extraordinary neatness and rapidity of execution. His tone was, however, hard and thin, and he seldom played with musical feeling. The pieces in which he proved most successful were Louis Drouet's "Rule Britannia", Daniel Auber's "Les Montagnards", his own variations on "There's nae Luck" (published in 1845, fol.), and the Russian national hymn. The last two are still popular with flautists. He composed many brilliant and difficult fantasias for the flute, and edited a volume of technical studies for the instrument (London, 1844, fol.)
