= Jack Richardson (footballer, born 1886) =

Australian rules footballer

Personal information
- Full name: Jack Elliott Richardson
- Born: 7 April 1886; Melbourne, Victoria
- Died: 12 December 1965 (aged 79); Brisbane, Queensland
- Original team: Leopold

Playing career^{1}
Years	Club	Games (Goals)
1909	South Melbourne	1 (0)
- ^{1} Playing statistics correct to the end of 1909.

Jack Elliott Richardson (7 April 1886 – 12 December 1965) was an Australian rules footballer who played with South Melbourne in the Victorian Football League (VFL).

== Family ==
The son of Francis Gordon Richardson (1855–1935) and Gertrude Richardson, née Ledwidge (1859–1935), Jack Elliott Richardson was born in Melbourne on 7 April 1886.

He married Teresa (Tess) Green in March 1911 but differences over the religious upbringing of their children led to his wife leaving him in 1925 and subsequently their divorce in 1936. He subsequently married Maud Sanderson and they lived in Brisbane until his death in 1965.
