= Howard Richardson =

Howard Richardson may refer to:

- Howard Richardson (footballer) (1894–1959), Australian rules footballer and cricketer
- Howard Richardson (playwright) (1917–1985), American playwright
- Col. Howard Richardson (1921–2018), pilot of the 1958 Tybee Island B-47 crash
