= Tony Richardson (disambiguation) =

Tony Richardson (1928–1991) was a British film director.

Tony Richardson may also refer to:

- Tony Richardson (American football) (born 1971), former American football fullback
- Tony Richardson (British Army officer) (1922–2015)
- Tony Richardson (Australian footballer) (1925–1999), Australian rules footballer
- Tony Rickardsson (born 1970), Swedish motorcycle racer
- Tony Richardson (footballer, born 1932), English footballer
- Tony Richardson (footballer, born 1943) (1943–2007), English footballer

== See also ==
- Antonio Richardson (born 1992), American football offensive lineman
- Anthony Richardson (disambiguation)
