= Harold Richardson (cricketer) =

English cricketer (1873–1906)

Personal information
- Full name: Harold Bamford Richardson
- Born: 10 March 1873; Rochdale, Lancashire, England
- Died: 18 April 1906 (aged 33); San Francisco, California, United States
- Batting: Right-handed

Domestic team information
- Years: Team
- 1899: Surrey

Career statistics
Competition	First-class
Matches	22
Runs scored	585
Batting average	22.50
100s/50s	0/3
Top score	72
Catches/stumpings	8/–
- Source: Cricinfo, 30 November 2023

Harold Bamford Richardson (10 March 1873 – 18 April 1906) was an English first-class cricketer who played 22 matches for Surrey in 1899. He was born in Rochdale.

Richardson played a full season for Surrey in 1899, batting in the middle order. His highest score was 72 against Oxford University.

After his brief career with Surrey, Richardson spent several years in San Francisco, where he was prominent in local cricket. He represented California against the touring Lord Hawke's XI in 1902, when he top-scored with 27. He was killed in the 1906 San Francisco earthquake.
