= Charles Richardson (Lincolnshire cricketer) =

English cricketer

Personal information
- Full name: Charles Adrian Richardson
- Born: 5 June 1946 (age 80); Stamford, Lincolnshire, England
- Batting: Right-handed

Domestic team information
- Years: Team
- 1965–1979: Lincolnshire

Career statistics
Competition	List A
Matches	4
Runs scored	75
Batting average	37.50
100s/50s	–/–
Top score	31
Catches/stumpings	–/–
- Source: Cricinfo, 24 June 2011

Charles Adrian Richardson (born 5 June 1946) is a former English cricketer. Richardson was a right-handed batsman. He was born in Stamford, Lincolnshire.

Richardson made his debut for Lincolnshire in the 1965 Minor Counties Championship against the Nottinghamshire Second XI. Richardson played Minor counties cricket for Lincolnshire from 1965 to 1979, during which time he played infrequently for the county, making 38 Minor Counties Championship appearances. He made his List A debut against Hampshire in the 1966 Gillette Cup. He played 3 further List A matches for Lincolnshire, the last coming against Surrey in the 1974 Gillette Cup. In his 4 matches, he scored 75 runs at an average of 37.50, with a high score of 31.
