= James Richardson (political consultant) =

Conservative American political strategist and columnist

James Richardson (born October 30, 1984) is a conservative American political strategist and columnist best known as a spokesman and adviser to the Republican National Committee and former Governors Jon Huntsman and Haley Barbour. In a September 2014 opinion editorial published in the Washington Post, Richardson openly disclosed that he is gay. As of July 2015, he serves as managing director of Dentons, a global law practice, in the firm's public policy and regulatory affairs group.

== Career ==
In the 2008 presidential election, Richardson served as Online Communications Manager for the Republican National Committee. He briefly served as Communications Director for the College Republican National Committee before accepting a position with the Conservative consultancy Hynes Communications, which specializes in Conservative blogger outreach. Richardson took leave from the firm in 2011 to advise then-Mississippi Governor Haley Barbour, who was openly weighing a presidential bid. After weathering criticism for his perceived proximity to racist groups, Barbour eventually announced in mid-2011 he would forgo a campaign for the White House. Richardson was the first of Barbour's advisors to join another campaign, accepting a position as Director of Online Communications for Jon Huntsman's presidential campaign. After Huntsman's resignation from the race following his third-place finish in New Hampshire, Richardson returned to Hynes Communications as Vice President of Public Relations. According to media reports, some of his clients have included the National Republican Senatorial Committee and Indiana Senator Dan Coats

Richardson has written extensively on political and cultural issues and has appeared on CNN, MSNBC and Fox News. His columns have appeared in The Atlantic, GQ, US News & World Report, National Review, The Washington Post, The Guardian,' The Advocate Magazine, The Christian Science Monitor, USA Today, Politico, Roll Call, the Washington Times, Creative Loafing, Fox News, CNN, CBS News, and The Huffington Post. He edits the political news blog Georgia Tipsheet, which the Washington Post named one of the "best state-based blogs" in the country in 2013.

== Personal life ==
In September 2014, Richardson authored an Op-Ed in The Washington Post in which he publicly disclosed he is gay. In the column, Richardson said he advocated for equal rights for LGBT persons throughout his career "even as I never openly disclosed my personal stake" in the debate.

Richardson's coming out was covered by CNN, The Huffington Post, The Advocate, MTV, and the Atlanta Journal-Constitution, among others.

Richardson lives in Atlanta, Georgia, with his partner of five years. He attended the University of Georgia.

== Selected writings ==
- "Who Were the Midwives of America's Gay Marriage Movement?," Newsweek, June 21, 2015, James Richardson
- Richardson, James (February 28, 2015). "A good Republican for gay marriage". The New York Daily News.
- "The Real Reason Rob Portman Won't Run for President," The Advocate Magazine, Dec. 4, 2014, James Richardson
- "How House Dems Lost Their Last Southern White Guy," The Daily Beast, Nov. 9, 2014, James Richardson
- "I'm A Senior GOP Spokesman, And I'm Gay. Let Me Get Married." The Washington Post, Sept. 4, 2014, James Richardson
- "Teacher Tenure Refugees Flee Public Schools," USA Today, July 29, 2014, James Richardson
- "One Year After DOMA Fell, and Still No Revolution," U.S. News & World Report, June 26, 2014, James Richardson
- "An Honesty Gap in the Pay Gap Debate," Roll Call, April 23, 2014, James Richardson
- "Sin City A Virtuous Venue for GOP Convention," USA Today, March 21, 2014, James Richardson
- "Stop Arizona-Style Anti-Gay Bill In Georgia," CNN, Feb. 27, 2014, James Richardson
- "You're Not Fired, Ever," National Review, Dec. 30, 2013, James Richardson
- "Congress Must Lead By Dealing With The Deficit," POLITICO, Nov. 5, 2014, James Richardson
- "Why Supreme Court's Gay Marriage Ruling Won't Be Like Roe," Christian Science Monitor, June 10, 2013, James Richardson
- "Gun Control Misfire To Cost Lives In Georgia," Fox News, Feb. 1, 2013, James Richardson
- "How Mitt Romney's Historic Debate Confounded Political Science Convention," The Guardian, Oct. 10, 2012, James Richardson
- "Kasim's Gay Problem," Creative Loafing, June 25, 2012, James Richardson
- "Not Waiting Their Turn," FOX News, June 12, 2012, James Richardson
- "Gingrich Refuses To Quit," GQ, March 15, 2012, James Richardson
- "American Has Moved On From Romney's Mormonism," The Guardian, March 8, 2012, James Richardson
- "Northern Snobbery Fuels Paula Deen Fingerpointing," FOX News, Jan. 21, 2012, James Richardson
- "What Was The Huntsman Campaign's Problem?", The Atlantic, Jan. 17, 2012, James Richardson
- "The Politics Of Appointment," POLITICO, April 29, 2011, James Richardson
- "Haley Barbour, The GOP's Best Candidate Not To Run," The Guardian, April 26, 2011, James Richardson
- "Food Or Facebook For America's Homeless?," The Huffington Post, Dec. 12, 2010, James Richardson
- "What Democrats Wish For," FOX News, Oct. 28, 2010, James Richardson
- "Dems Play Politics With 9/11 Workers," POLITICO, Aug. 1, 2010, James Richardson
