= Tom Richards (rugby union, born 1895) =

Wales international rugby union player

- Full name: Thomas Lewis Richards
- Born: 13 October 1895 Maesteg, Wales
- Died: 25 May 1975 (aged 79) Maesteg, Wales
- Height: 6 ft (183 cm)
- Weight: 13 st (182 lb; 83 kg)

Rugby union career
- Position: Forward
International career
Years	Team	Apps	(Points)
1923	Wales	1	(0)

Thomas Lewis Richards (13 October 1895 – 25 May 1975) was a Welsh international rugby union player.

A product of Plasnewydd Schoolboys in Maesteg, Richards was a forward and began playing for Maesteg RFC after World War I, during which he served as a gunner with the Royal Field Artillery. He was capped for Wales in a 1923 Five Nations match against Ireland at Lansdowne Road. Like many players of the time, Richards was a collier by profession.

== See also ==
- List of Wales national rugby union players
