= Brian Richardson =

Brian Richardson may refer to:

- Brian Richardson (bobsleigh) (born 1955), American Olympic bobsledder
- Brian Richardson (cricketer) (1932–2020), Australian cricketer
- Brian Richardson (rower) (1947–2024), Australian Olympic rower
- Brian Richardson (footballer) (1934–2020), English footballer

== See also ==
- Bryan Richardson, English cricketer
