= Lawrence Richardson =

Lawrence, Laurence, or Larry Richardson may refer to:

== Religious figures ==
- Laurence Richardson (bishop) (1701–1753), Bishop of Kilmore
- Lawrence Richardson (martyr) (died 1582), Catholic martyr

== Others ==
- Lawrence Richardson Jr. (1920–2013), American Classicist and ancient historian
- Lawrence Richardson (American football) on USA Today All-USA high school football team
- Lawrence Richardson (academic) on List of Fellows of the American Academy in Rome 1896–1970
- Larry Richardson (1927–2007), musician
- Laurence R. Richardson, recipient of the Hutton Medal
