= Danny Richardson =

Danny Richardson may refer to:

- Danny Richardson (baseball)
- Danny Richardson (rugby league), English rugby league footballer

== See also ==
- Dan Richardson (born 1996), English rugby union player
- Daniel Richardson (born 2001), American football player
