= Geoff Richardson (cricketer) =

Australian cricketer (born 1956)

Personal information
- Born: 7 December 1956 (age 69); Koo Wee Rup, Australia

Domestic team information
- Years: Team
- 1982-1985: Victoria
- Source: Cricinfo, 6 December 2015

Geoff Richardson (born 7 December 1956) is an Australian former cricketer. He played 15 first-class cricket matches for Victoria between 1982 and 1985.

== See also ==
- List of Victoria first-class cricketers
