= Albert Richardson =

Albert Richardson may refer to:

- Albert Richardson (architect) (1880–1964), English architect
- Albert Richardson (priest) (1868–1905), English missionary to Africa and India
- Albert Richardson (Wisconsin politician) (1864–1937), American politician
- Albert D. Richardson (1833–1869), American journalist, Union spy, and author
- Albert E. Richardson (inventor), English inventor who designed the first practical Teasmade
- Albert F. Richardson (1868–1932), American law enforcement officer and politician
- J. Albert Richardson (c. 1938–2002), trade unionist and politician in New Brunswick

== See also ==
- Bert Richardson (disambiguation)
- Al Richardson (disambiguation)
