= Alexander Richardson (Puritan intellectual) =

English logician

Alexander Richardson (c1565-1613?) was an English logician.

== Life ==
Richardson was a Master of Arts at Queens' College, Cambridge. He also tutored at George Walker's house in Barking, Essex.

== Works ==
Richardson wrote a logic textbook in the Ramist tradition, The logicians school-master: or, A comment upon Ramus logick.: By Mr. Alexander Richardson, sometime of Queenes Colledge in Cambridge. Whereunto are added, his prelections on Ramus his grammer; Taleus his rhetorick; also his notes on physicks, ethicks, astronomy, medicine, and opticks. The book was first published in London in 1629 and enlarged in 1657.
