= Edward Richardson (sculptor) =

English sculptor

- Born: 1812
- Died: 17 May 1869 (aged 56–57); Marylebone, London, England
- Occupation: Sculptor

Edward Richardson (1812 – 17 May 1869) was an English sculptor.

== Biography ==
Richardson was born in 1812. He first appeared as an exhibitor at the Royal Academy in 1836, and until 1866 he continued to send at first classical subjects, and then portrait busts and monumental works. He also exhibited in Suffolk Street and at the British Institution. He incurred some opprobrium by his restoration of the effigies of the knights templars in the Temple church in 1842, and was refused admission to the Society of Antiquaries. The effigies had suffered before he began to restore them, by being left in a damp shed in Hare Court during the winter of 1841–2. Richardson also restored the monuments of the Earl and Countess of Arundel in Chichester Cathedral in 1844, and that of Richard de Wyche, bishop of Chichester, in the same place, in 1846 (Gent. Mag. 1847, i. 258, with etching). He gave an account of these and other monuments when the Archæological Institute visited Chichester in 1853 (ib. 1853, ii. 288). In 1848–9 he restored eight ancient effigies in Elford church, Staffordshire (ib. 1852, ii. 66). In 1850 he repaired one of the seated statues on the west front of Wells Cathedral, which had fallen from a height of sixty feet (Archæol. Journal, viii. 201). In 1852 he communicated to the Archæological Institute a paper on mediæval sculpture in alabaster in England (ib. x. 116). He was commissioned to make or procure many of the casts of sepulchral effigies for the Crystal Palace, Sydenham, and gave an account of the effigies of English kings at Fontevrault and Le Mans to the Archæological Institute in 1854 (ib. xi. 298).

Among his original works are the recumbent effigy in alabaster of the Earl of Powis (1848) at Welshpool, that of the Marquis of Ormonde (1854) in Kilkenny Cathedral, many military monuments at Woolwich and in Canterbury Cathedral, and the monument to Sir Robert Dick at Madras.

Richardson was an active member of the London and Middlesex Archæological Society. After some years of ill-health he died of erysipelas on 17 May 1869, at Melbury Terrace, Marylebone.

He published "The Monumental Effigies of the Temple Church," London, 1843, 4to; "Ancient Stone and Leaden Coffins, recently discovered in the Temple Church," 1845; "Monumental Effigies and Tombs in Elford Church," 1852, with thirteen etchings, and several papers in the "Archæological Journal."

Richardson is sometimes confused with the artist Edward Martindale Richardson (born 1810).
