= Bert Richardson =

Bert Richardson may refer to:

- Bert Richardson (footballer) (1887–1962), Australian rules footballer
- Bert Richardson (judge) (born 1956), American judge on the Texas Court of Criminal Appeals
- Bert Richardson, former Principal Secretary of Canada
- Bert Richardson, candidate in Cumbria County Council election, 2013

== See also ==
- Albert Richardson (disambiguation)
- Robert Richardson (disambiguation)
- Herbert Richardson (disambiguation)
- Hubert Richardson (1927–2020), California politician
- Bertram Richardson (1932–2020), cricketer
