= Len Richardson (footballer) =

Australian rules footballer (1891–1924)

Personal information
- Full name: Leonard Wallace Richardson
- Born: 10 February 1891; Malvern, Victoria
- Died: 7 April 1924 (aged 33); Heidelberg, Victoria
- Original team: Northcote
- Height: 170 cm (5 ft 7 in)

Playing career^{1}
Years	Club	Games (Goals)
1910	Fitzroy	1 (0)
- ^{1} Playing statistics correct to the end of 1910.

Leonard Wallace Richardson (10 February 1891 – 7 April 1924) was an Australian rules footballer who played with Fitzroy in the Victorian Football League (VFL).
