= Anne Richardson (conservationist) =

New Zealand conservationist

Anne Richardson ONZM
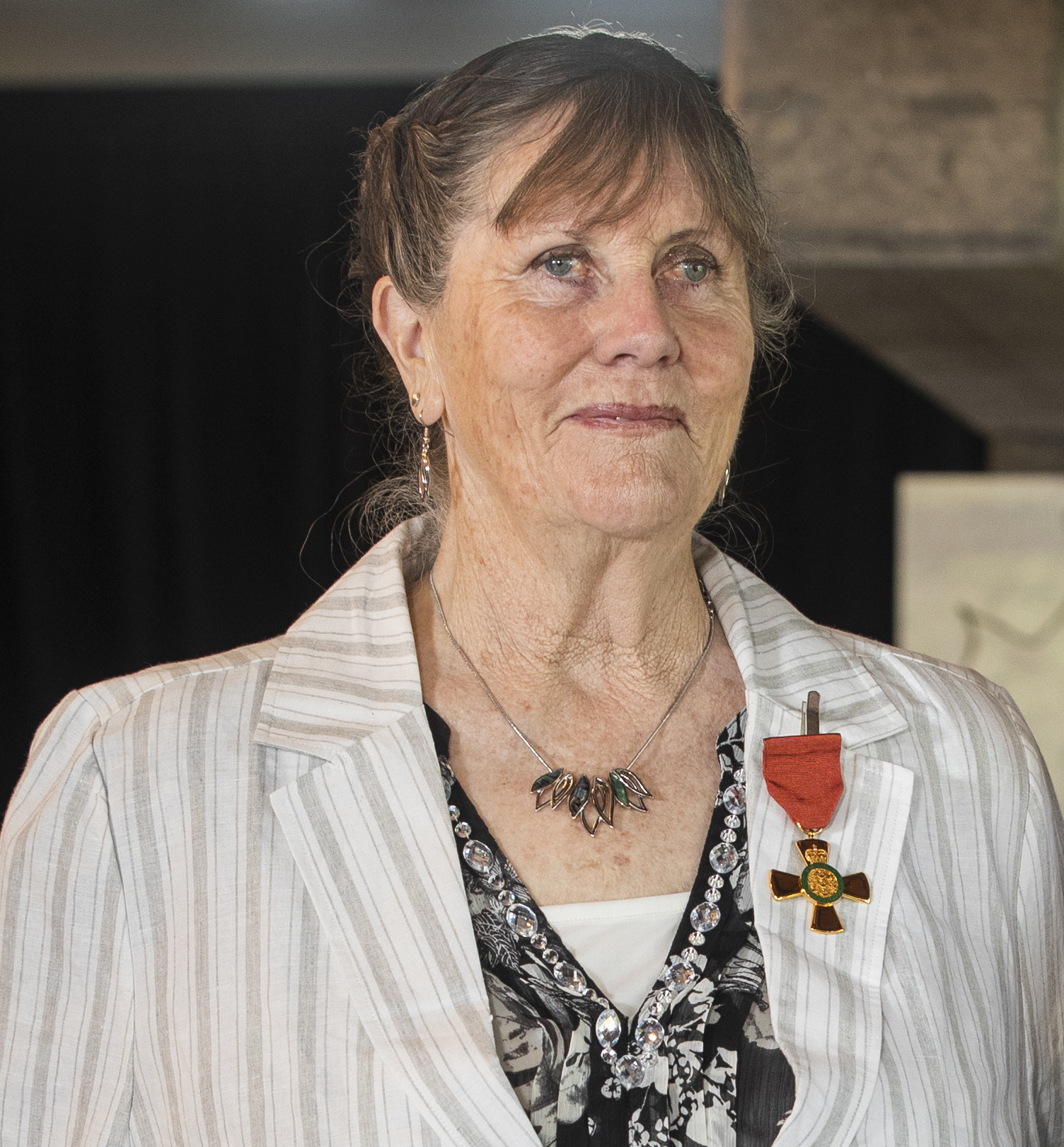
- Richardson in 2020, after receiving her ONZM
- Employer(s): Isaac Conservation and Wildlife Trust

Anne Lesley Richardson ONZM is a New Zealand conservationist. She is wildlife manager at Isaac Conservation and Wildlife Trust (ICWT), where she has pioneered techniques used to save endangered species of birds from extinction.

Richardson joined the ICWT in the early 1990s. Her work has involved developing techniques to incubate and raise kākāriki karaka chicks, and subsequently release young birds in the wild. She has also worked to conserve a number of waterbirds, including kakī, pāteke, tūturuatu and whio.

She was appointed an Officer of the New Zealand Order of Merit in the 2020 Queen's Birthday Honours for "services to wildlife conservation".
