= Margaret Foster Richardson =

American painter

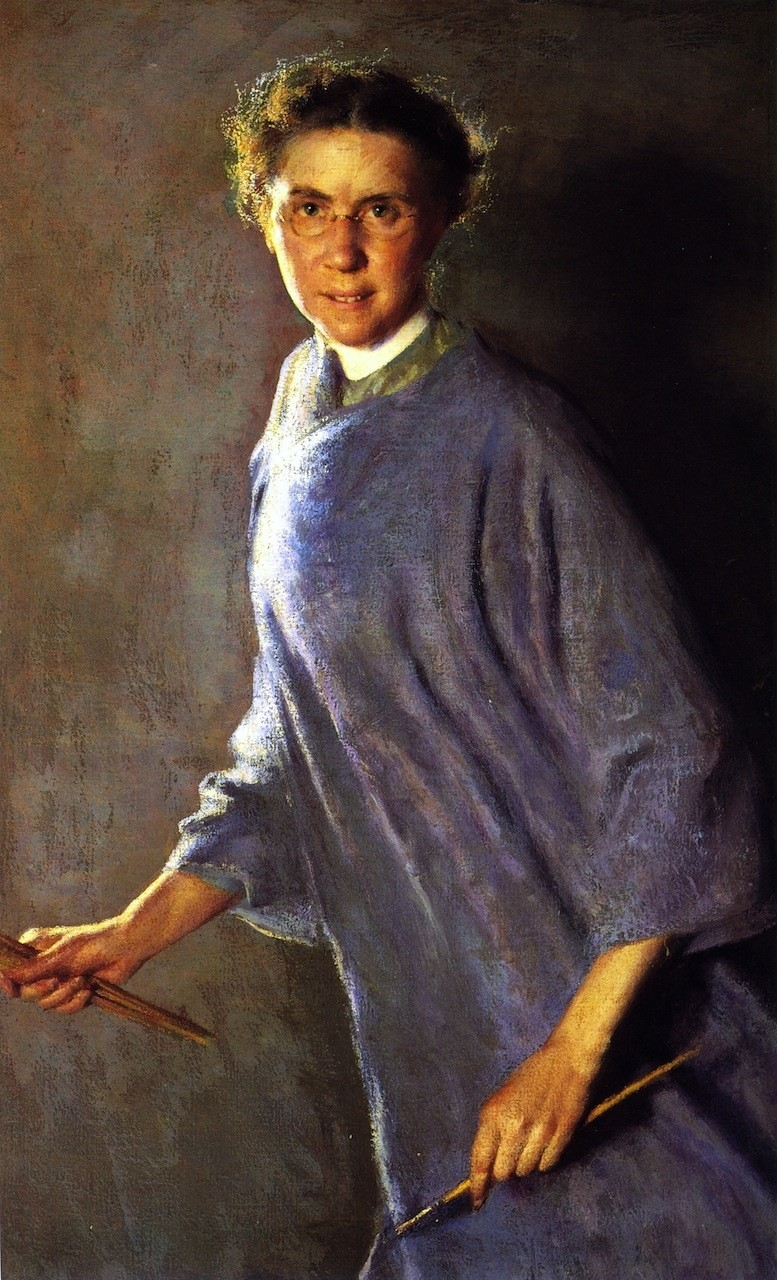
Margaret Foster Richardson: A Motion Picture, self-portrait (1912)

Margaret Foster Richardson (December 19, 1881 – 1945) was an American painter known for her self-portraiture. Richardson is best known for her 1912 painting, Self-Portrait, A Motion Picture.

== Early life and education ==
Richardson was born in Winnetka, Illinois. She moved to Boston as a youth, where she studied art at the School of the Museum of Fine Arts. She graduated from the Normal Art School in 1905, where she studied under Joseph DeCamp and Edmund C. Tarbell.

== Career ==
Richardson exhibited art at Pennsylvania Academy of the Fine Arts in Philadelphia, the Corcoran Gallery of Art in Washington, D.C., the National Academy of Design in New York City, the Art Institute of Chicago, and the Carnegie Institute in Pittsburgh.

In Richardson's Self-Portrait, A Motion Picture, she painted herself in action, prepared to paint. As one critic observed, "She's striding forward at full tilt, brushes in both hands, looking as if she can't wait to attack the canvas. Her expression is one of gusto and almost missionary zeal. Hers is a self- portrait you might back away from." Another scholar remarked that the portrait "effaces many of the contemporary markers of femininity" to portray a more modern New Woman.

Her work is in the National Gallery of Art, the Pennsylvania Academy of the Fine Arts, and the Worcester Art Museum.
