= Henry Richardson =

Henry Richardson may refer to:

== Politics ==
- Henry Westman Richardson (1855–1918), Canadian businessman and Senator
- Henry Robson Richardson (1879–1966), politician in Manitoba, Canada
- Henry Richardson (Northern Ireland politician) (1883–?), politician in Northern Ireland
- Henry J. Richardson Jr. (1902–1983), American lawyer, judge, and state legislator in Indiana
- Henry Richardson (New Hampshire politician) (1917–1981), American soldier and state legislator

== Sports ==
- Henry Richardson (cricketer, born 1846) (1846–1921), English businessman and cricketer
- Henry Richardson (cricketer, born 1857) (1857–1940), English cricketer
- Henry B. Richardson (1889–1963), Olympic archer
- Henry Richardson (baseball) (1917-1981), Negro league baseball player

== Others ==
- Henry Hobson Richardson (1838–1886), architect
- Henry Handel Richardson (1870–1946), author
- Henry S. Richardson (born 1955), American philosopher
- Henry Richardson (film editor) (1936–2017), English and American film editor
- Henry Richardson (artist) (born 1961), sculptor
- Henry Gerald Richardson (1884–1974), English historian and civil servant

== See also ==
- Harry Richardson (disambiguation)
