= George Richardson (footballer, born 1899) =

English footballer

Personal information
- Full name: George William Richard Richardson
- Date of birth: 15 February 1899
- Place of birth: Gainsborough, Lincolnshire, England
- Date of death: 13 November 1963 (aged 64)
- Place of death: Boston, England
- Height: 5 ft 9 1/2 in (1.77 m)
- Position: Left half

Senior career*
Years	Team	Apps	(Gls)
- Gainsborough Wednesday
19??–1921	Lincoln City (Note: Infobox statistics are for Football League appearances only. The free-access sections of the Lincoln City FC Archive does not distinguish between appearances in competitions other than the Football League.)	12	(0)
1921–1923	Sheffield United	13	(0)
1924–1925	Bournemouth & Boscombe Athletic	9	(0)
- Boston Town
- * Club domestic league appearances and goals

George William Richard Richardson (15 February 1899 – 13 November 1963) was an English footballer who made 34 appearances in the Football League playing for Lincoln City, Sheffield United and Bournemouth & Boscombe Athletic. He played as a left half. He also played in the Midland League for Lincoln, and in non-league football for Boston Town.
