= Neil Richardson =

Neil Richardson may refer to:

- Neil Richardson (composer) (1930–2010)
- Neil Richardson (footballer) (born 1968)
- Neil Richardson, president of the Methodist Conference for 2003
