= Judge Richardson =

Judge Richardson may refer to:

- Eli J. Richardson (born 1967), judge of the United States District Court for the Middle District of Tennessee
- Julius N. Richardson (born 1976), judge of the United States Court of Appeals for the Fourth Circuit
- Scovel Richardson (1912–1982), judge of the United States Customs Court and the United States Court of International Trade
- William Adams Richardson (1821–1896), judge of the United States Court of Claims

== See also ==
- Justice Richardson (disambiguation)
