= Katie Richardson =

Australian model

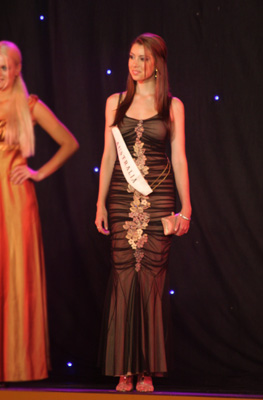
- Born: Katie Marie Richardson; 1988 (age 37–38); Albion Park, Australia
- Beauty pageant titleholder
- Title: Miss Australia 2008

Katie Marie Richardson is an Australian model and beauty pageant titleholder who represented Australia in Miss World 2008 in South Africa. She studied for a degree in nutrition and dietetics with plans to earn a PhD in this field, she also has a side job as a dance teacher, working at APDA to teach girls at Shellharbour physie and dance
