= Hamilton Richardson =

American businessman

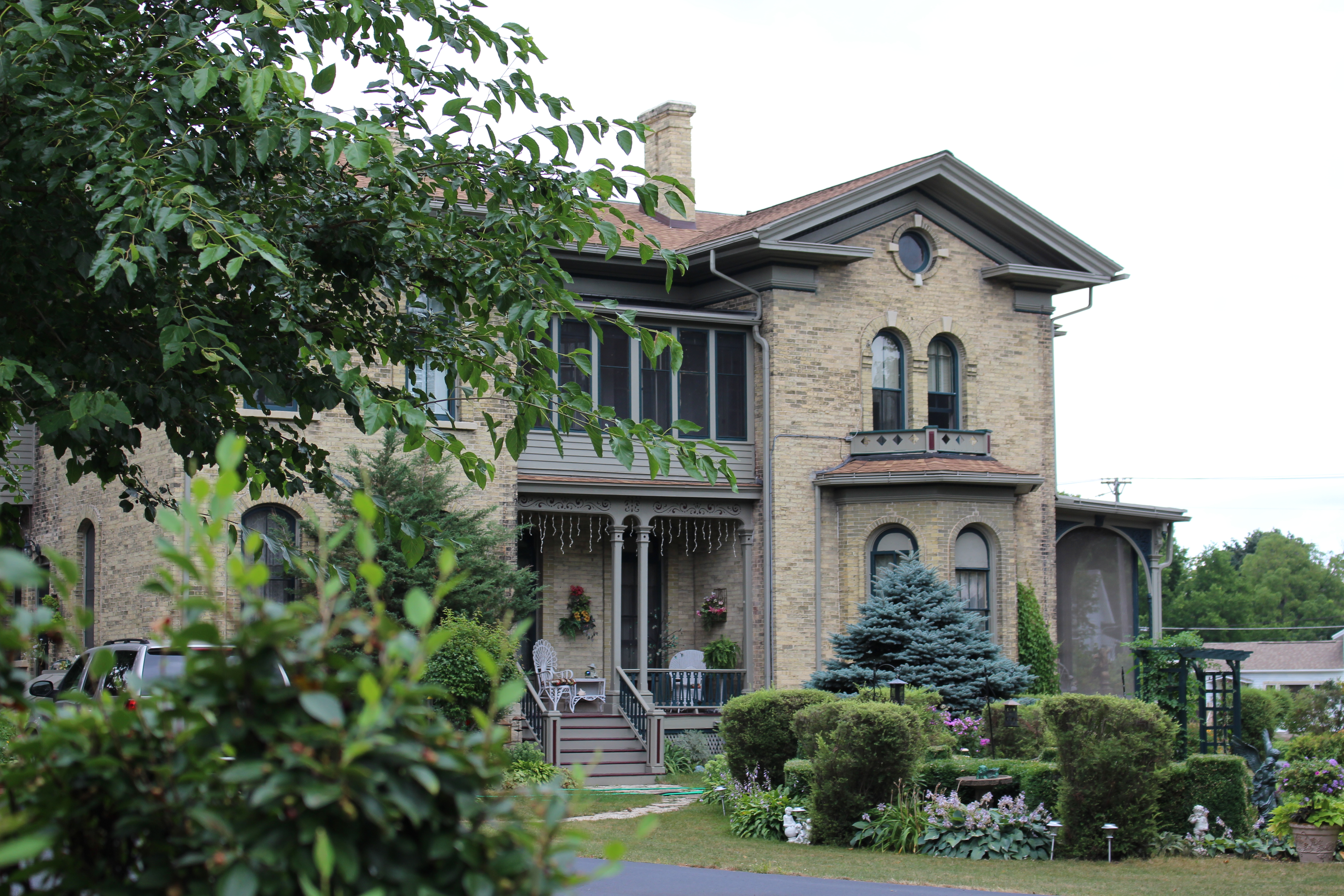
Richardson's house, built 1874, at 429 Prospect Ave, Janesville

Hamilton Richardson (October 17, 1820 – September 22, 1906) was an American businessman from Janesville, Wisconsin who spent one year (1864) as a member of the Wisconsin State Assembly and six years (1877–1882) as a Republican member of the Wisconsin State Senate from Rock County, Wisconsin.
