= Mel Richardson =

American politician from Idaho

Melvin "Mel" Richardson (April 29, 1928 – December 11, 2014) was an American radio broadcaster and politician.

Born in Salt Lake City, Utah, Richardson was a radio broadcaster and later was a television broadcaster. Richardson served as Mayor of Ammon, Idaho and was a Republican. In 1988, Richardson served in the Idaho House of Representatives and then he served in the Idaho State Senate from 1992 until 2008. Richardson died of cancer in Idaho Falls, Idaho.
