= Ralph Richardson (geologist) =

Scottish lawyer and geologist

Ralph Richardson WS FRSE FRSGS FEGS (22 November 1845 – 26 June 1933) was a Scottish lawyer and noted amateur geologist and historian.

== Life ==
He was born in Edinburgh on 22 November 1845 the son of Alison Black, daughter of Adam Black, Lord Provost of Edinburgh, and her husband James Richardson FRSE (d.1868), a merchant. He was educated at Edinburgh High School then Edinburgh Academy 1857 to 1861. He also spent at least a year at the Kreuzschule in Dresden (indicating that he had musical abilities). He was then apprenticed as a lawyer to Maclachlan, Ivory and Rodger WS at 25 Castle Street. He also undertook formal studies in law at the University of Edinburgh and the College de France in Paris.

In 1870 he lived at 16 Coates Crescent.

In 1875 he was elected a Fellow of the Royal Society of Edinburgh for his contributions to geology. His proposers were David Milne Home, Ramsay Heatley Traquair, Alexander Buchan and John Hutton Balfour.

In 1882 he co-founded the Edinburgh Geological Society, also serving as its first Vice President. He gave the inaugural address: "Agassis and Glacial Geology". In the same year he lived at 10 Magdala Place in Edinburgh's West End and had offices at 19 Castle Street in Edinburgh's First New Town, just off Princes Street. In 1895 he gave a further annual lecture "Old Edinburgh Geologists".

In later life he served as HM Commissary Clerk to Edinburgh.

He died at Magdala Place in Edinburgh on 26 June 1933.

== Publications ==
- The County of Edinburgh or Midlothian: Its Geology, Agriculture and Geology (1878)
- Coutts & Co, Bankers (1901)
- George Morland, Painter, London (1901)
- The Influence of the Natural Features and Geology of Scotland on the Scottish People (1908)

== Family ==
In 1879 he married Melville Elizabeth Fleming (sic) daughter of Andrew Fleming FRSE (1822-1901). They had no children.
