= Walter Richardson (cricketer) =

Australian cricketer

Personal information
- Born: 24 October 1876; Sandford, Tasmania, Australia
- Died: 30 May 1962 (aged 85); Hobart, Tasmania, Australia

Domestic team information
- Years: Team
- 1898-1912: Tasmania
- Source: Cricinfo, 16 January 2016

Walter Richardson (24 October 1876 – 30 May 1962) was an Australian cricketer. He played four first-class matches for Tasmania between 1898 and 1912.

== See also ==
- List of Tasmanian representative cricketers
