= Richard Richardson =

Richard Richardson may refer to:

- Richard Richardson (British politician) (1664–1714), M.P. for Ipswich
- Richard Richardson (botanist) (1663–1741), English physician and botanist
- Richard Richardson (general) (1704–1780), American Revolutionary War General
- Richard Richardson (Canadian politician) (1820–1885), Ontario political figure
- Richard Richardson (Australian politician) (1825–1913), member of the Victorian Legislative Assembly
- Richard J. Richardson (born 1935), American political scientist
- Richard Richardson (tennis) (1852–1930), British tennis player
- Richie Richardson (born 1962), West Indies cricketer

== See also ==
- Dick Richardson (disambiguation)
