= Edward Richardson (cricketer) =

Australian cricketer

Personal information
- Born: 8 December 1929; Hobart, Tasmania, Australia
- Died: 29 July 2009 (aged 79); Launceston, Tasmania, Australia

Domestic team information
- Years: Team
- 1958-1964: Tasmania
- Source: Cricinfo, 11 March 2016

Edward Richardson (8 December 1929 – 29 July 2009) was an Australian cricketer. He played six first-class matches for Tasmania between 1958 and 1964.

== See also ==
- List of Tasmanian representative cricketers
