= Ken Richardson =

Ken or Kenneth Richardson may refer to:

- Ken Richardson (baseball) (1915–1987), American baseball player
- Ken Richardson (ice hockey) (born 1951), Canadian hockey player
- Ken Richardson (racing driver) (1911–1997), British racing driver
- Ken Richardson (athlete) (1918–1998), English athlete
- Ken Richardson (basketball) (1950–2013), American basketball player
- Ken Richardson (psychologist) (born 1942), British psychologist
- Ken Richardson (public servant), Official Secretary to the Governor-General of New Zealand from 1990 to 1993
- Kenneth Richardson, administrator of the Covent Garden Festival from 1996 to 2000
- Ken Richardson (died 2023), chairman of Doncaster Rovers F.C. in the 1990s

== See also ==
- Ken Rickards (disambiguation)
