= Albert E. Richardson (inventor) =

Albert Edward Richardson was an iron turner and fitter from Ashton-under-Lyne, Lancashire, who designed the first practical Teasmade.

He designed the first practical Teasmade based on an alarm clock, a spirit lamp and a tipping kettle. He sold the design to gunsmith Frank Clarke of Birmingham for an undisclosed sum, who patented it in 1902, calling it "An Apparatus Whereby a Cup of Tea or Coffee is Automatically Made".
