= Vic Richardson (Australian soldier) =

Thomas William Victor Richardson (1891 – 1968) was an Australian soldier in World War I whose diaries were published in 1980.

Born in Stepney, Adelaide in 1891 he was schooled at Payneham and enlisted in 1915. He fought in France and served in many famous battles including the Somme, Bullecourt and Passchendaele. He was wounded in August 1918.

His diaries came to light after his death and were edited and published by A.D. Bell in 1980.

== Bibliography ==
An ANZACs War Diary - the Story of Sergeant Richardson, A.D. Bell, Rigby, Adelaide, 1980 ISBN 0-7270-1437-4
