= George Richardson (ice hockey) =

Canadian ice hockey player, businessman and soldier

- Hockey Hall of Fame, 1950
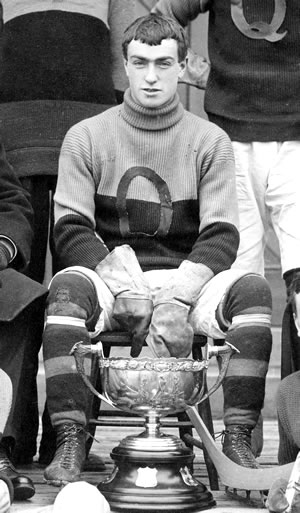
- Richardson with the Queen's University Golden Gaels in 1906
- Born: September 14, 1886 Kingston, Ontario, Canada
- Died: February 9, 1916 (aged 29) Wulverghem, Belgium
- Height: 6 ft 1 in (185 cm)
- Weight: 195 lb (88 kg; 13 st 13 lb)
- Position: Left wing
- Shot: Left
- Played for: Queen's University; Kingston Frontenacs
- Playing career: 1902–1912
- Military career
- Allegiance: Canada
- Branch: Canadian Expeditionary Force
- Service years: 1914–1916
- Rank: Captain
- Conflicts: First World War
- Awards: Legion of Honour

George Taylor Richardson (September 14, 1886 – February 9, 1916) was a Canadian ice hockey player, businessman and soldier. Richardson played hockey for Queen's University and the 14th Regiment of Kingston, and was considered one of the finest amateurs of his time. He is enshrined in the Hockey Hall of Fame, and is the namesake of the George Richardson Memorial Trophy. Richardson was part of a prominent business family that owned and operated a grain processing business in Kingston, Ontario. He joined the Canadian Expeditionary Force in the First World War, and died in action in Belgium.

== Personal life ==
Richardson was born and raised in Kingston, and graduated from Queen's with a bachelor of science degree in 1906. He was part of the prominent local Richardson family. His grandfather, James Richardson was the founder of James Richardson & Sons. His uncle, Henry Westman Richardson, was a businessman and a Canadian senator. His sister, Agnes was the benefactor of the Agnes Etherington Art Centre. His brother, James Armstrong Richardson Sr. was a businessman, aviator, and chancellor of Queen's University from 1929 to 1939. His niece, Agnes Benidickson was the first female chancellor of Queen's University. His nephews, James Armstrong Richardson was Manitoba businessman, and Canadian federal cabinet minister; and George Taylor Richardson was a Manitoba businessman, and Order of Manitoba recipient. After graduating from university Richardson joined his family's grain-exporting firm.

== Playing career ==
Richardson played for the Queen's University Golden Gaels from 1903 to 1906, when the team won the Intercollegiate Hockey Union in 1903, and the Canadian Intercollegiate championship in 1904, and 1906. He was known as a gentlemanly player, and an adept goal scorer. He scored five times against Princeton and Yale when Queen's won the 1903 North American collegiate title. The 1906 Queen's team challenged the Ottawa Hockey Club for the Stanley Cup. Richardson played left wing for the 14th Regiment of Kingston team from 1907 to 1909. The 1908 team won the Ontario Hockey Association title, and the J. Ross Robertson Cup, as Richardson scored seven goals in one game against Stratford. Richardson won the 1909 Allan Cup a year later. He then joined the Kingston Frontenacs as team president, when the juniors won the OHA title in 1911 and 1912. Richardson never pursued a professional hockey career, since he was wealthy enough from working in the family business.

== Military service ==
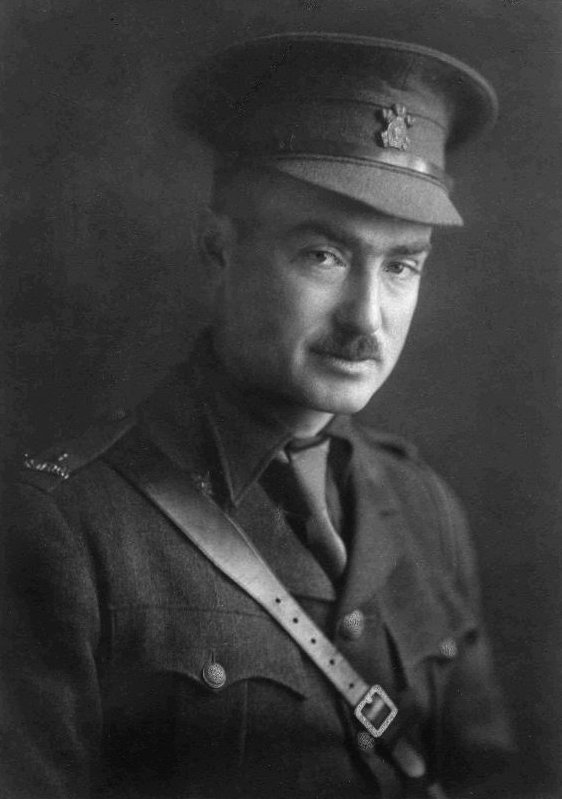
Richardson c. 1914

After graduating from Queen's Richardson had joined a local militia unit, and rose to become a Lieutenant with The Princess of Wales' Own Regiment. When the First World War was declared, he joined the Canadian Expeditionary Force on September 22, 1914, at CFB Valcartier. He was at the Western Front by February 1915.

Richardson was promoted to captain as a result of being the sole survivor in the 2nd Battalion during the a battle near Saint-Julien in Langemark. Captain Richardson bought boots and gas masks for men under his command. He was killed in action February 9, 1916, resulting from being shot three times in the hips and abdomen, in a battle near Wulverghem. He is buried in the Bailleul Communal Cemetery Extension in Bailleul, Nord in grave 2027, also listed as plot 2, row B, grave 74.

== Posthumous honours ==
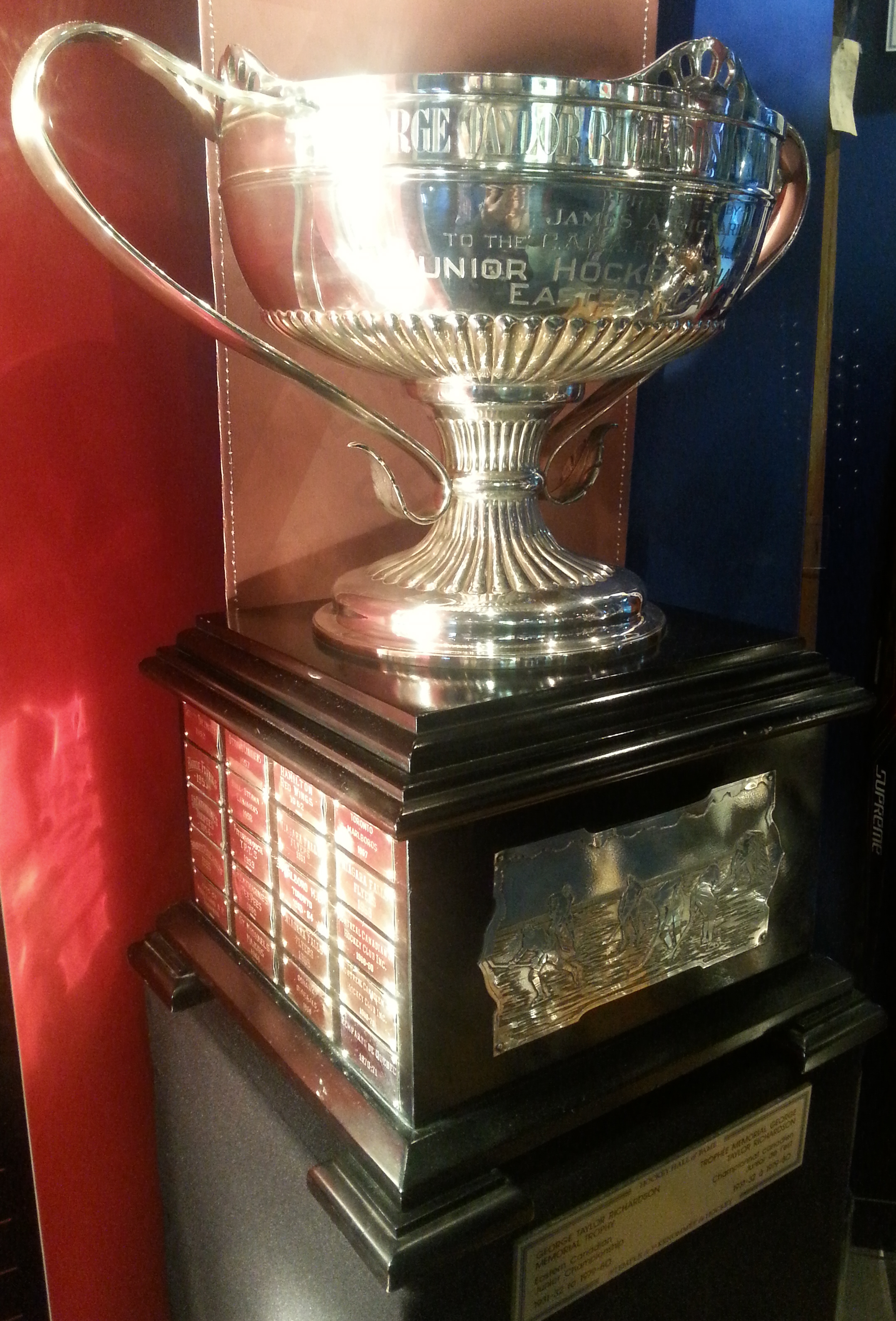
George Richardson Memorial Trophy at the Hockey Hall of Fame

Richardson became a Chevalier of the Legion of Honour of the French Third Republic on March 19, 1916. Captain Richardson is listed on page 154, of the Canadian Book of Remembrance for the First World War. He bequeathed $15,000 to Queen's University for art and athletics, $5,000 for bathing facilities in Kingston, $30,000 to city charities, and $30,000 form a trust fund for the education of the children of the married men in his company, that were disabled or killed in battle. The George Taylor Richardson Memorial Fund was established to provide grants for the stimulation of the arts at Queen's University. Richardson Memorial Stadium at Queen's is named in his honour. From 1932 to 1971, The Eastern Canada junior hockey champion won the George Richardson Memorial Trophy, and advanced to the Memorial Cup. Richardson was inducted into the Hockey Hall of Fame in 1950, and into the Kingston and District Sports Hall of Fame in 2015.

== Career statistics ==
| | | | Regular season | | | | | Playoffs |
| Season | Team | League | GP | G | A | Pts | PIM | GP | G | A | Pts | PIM |
|---|---|---|---|---|---|---|---|---|---|---|---|---|
| 1903–04 | Queen's University | CIHU | 4 | 6 | 0 | 6 | 3 | — | — | — | — | — |
| 1904–05 | Queen's University | CIHU | 4 | 6 | 0 | 6 | 0 | — | — | — | — | — |
| 1905–06 | Queen's University | CIHU | 4 | 11 | 0 | 11 | 2 | — | — | — | — | — |
| 1905–06 | Queen's University | St-Cup | — | — | — | — | — | 2 | 3 | 0 | 3 | 0 |
| 1906–07 | Kingston's 14th Regiment | OHA-Sr. | 7 | 23 | 0 | 23 | 0 | 2 | 2 | 0 | 2 | 0 |
| 1907–08 | Kingston's 14th Regiment | OHA-Sr. | 3 | 9 | 3 | 12 | 12 | 4 | 18 | 0 | 18 | 9 |
| 1908–09 | Kingston's 14th Regiment | OHA-Sr. | 4 | 8 | 0 | 8 | 9 | 2 | 13 | 0 | 13 | 0 |
| 1909–10 | Kingston Frontenacs | Exhib. | — | — | — | — | — | 2 | 8 | 0 | 8 | — |
| 1911–12 | Kingston Frontenacs | OHA-Sr. | — | — | — | — | — | 1 | 1 | 0 | 1 | 0 |
| CIHU totals | | | 12 | 23 | 0 | 23 | 5 | — | — | — | — | — |
| OHA-Sr. totals | | | 14 | 40 | 3 | 43 | 21 | 9 | 34 | 0 | 34 | 9 |
