= James Richardson (1819–1892) =

- Born: James Richardson; 1819; Aughnacloy, Ireland
- Died: 15 November 1892 (aged 72–73); Kingston, Ontario
- Resting place: Cataraqui Cemetery
- Occupations: merchant, tailor, politician, benefactor
- Known for: grain exporting, founder of James Richardson and Sons, Limited
- Spouse(s): Roxanna Day (m. 1 March 1845, d. 1848); Susannah Wartman (m. 11 March 1850)
- Children: Henry Westman Richardson
- Relatives: James A. Richardson Sr. (grandson); James A. Richardson (great grandson)

James Richardson (1819 – 15 November 1892) was a Canadian businessman, founder of James Richardson and Sons, Limited, politician, and a colleague and personal friend of Sir John A. Macdonald. James had two sons: George Armstrong Richardson and Henry Westman Richardson.

James died on 15 November 1892 leaving a business enterprise that survives today as James Richardson and Sons, Limited, the largest grain firm in the British Commonwealth. It is a privately owned agribusiness that is also involved with real estate, energy exploration, and food processing.

He is buried in Cataraqui Cemetery in Kingston, in the same cemetery as John A. Macdonald. Born in Ireland, Richardson emigrated to Canada around 1823 and was also a benefactor of Queen's University.

== Early life ==
James Richardson was born in 1819 in Aughnacloy, Ireland to Daniel Richardson and Janet Armstrong. He emigrated to Canada in approximately 1823 and at the age of ten years moved to Kingston. His business interests started in tailoring and soon moved to grain and potash speculation. In 1844, based on an advertisement in the 17 January 1844 Chronicle & Gazette, he and "Little" started their own merchant tailor's business on Princess Street in Kingston. The advertisement indicated that their specialties included "broad cloths, plain and figured beavers, cassimeres, doe skine [sic], tweeds, fancy and clan tartans, and an assortment of vestings". And those cloths were promised to be "made to order in the latest and most approved fashionable styles, on moderate terms, and at the shortest possible notice".

== James Richardson & Sons, Limited ==
Richardson lived above his merchant tailor's shop where he accepted grain as payment for some of his tailoring work. Sometime between the 1840s and the late 1860s, Richardson focused solely on the grain trade. In 1857, he founded James Richardson and Sons, Limited. The firm purchased "a wharf and warehouse on the Kingston waterfront" in 1868 becoming the first to export grain from Kingston. The 1871 Canada Federal Census lists James' occupation as "grain dealer". In the 1873–74 Kingston Directory, the business was referred to as "Richardson & Sons, Grain Dealers, Commercial Wharf, Foot of Princess St.". At this time his sons, George Algernon Richardson and Henry Westman Richardson became managing partners in the business. In 1880, the Richardsons built the first grain elevator in Kingston with a capacity of 60,000 bushels.

Richardson exported grain to several countries in Europe and South America. As early as 1855, Richardson had been shipping grain to Liverpool to help feed British troops during the Crimean War. He also traded in many other commodities and invested in other businesses in the Kingston area such as the Kingston and Pembroke Railway, and the Kingston Railway Company. His firm took an interest in the promising mining operations north of Kingston in the area of Canada known as the Canadian Shield.

In the 1880s, the firm acquired mineral rights to a feldspar and mica mine in Frontenac County, near Godfrey, known as the Richardson Feldspar Mine. Not mined until 1900, the mine became the largest feldspar producer in Ontario.

In 1892, James' wife became owner and executor of the firm. Later, ownership of the firm was to be transferred to their children, already full partners in the firm. George became president of the company, serving from 1892 through 1906, when his brother, Henry, became president and served until 1918.

== Political life ==
As a lifelong Conservative and former Alderman of the Victoria Ward, Richardson established a relationship with John A. Macdonald. "It was Sir John Macdonald's wish, on more than one occasion, that Mr. Richardson should stand as Conservative candidate for Kingston." MacDonald stated, "The Richardsons are and always have been strong and influential friends of mine." James' son, Henry Westman Richardson, became a Canadian Senator for the Kingston Senatorial Division and a member of the Standing Committee on Railways, Telegraphs and Harbours.

== Queen's University ==
The Toronto Daily Mail reported that James was "one of the most liberal benefactors" of Queen's University . James' grandson, James Armstrong Richardson, Sr., son of George Armstrong, became the chancellor of University in 1929 and was noted for donating funds that built the Richardson Memorial Stadium in honor of his brother, Captain George Taylor Richardson who died on the battlefield in World War I.
