= Kathleen M. Richardson =

Canadian philanthropist (1928–2019)

- Born: May 5, 1928; Winnipeg, Manitoba, Canada
- Died: September 14, 2019 (aged 91); Winnipeg, Manitoba, Canada
- Education: University of Manitoba
- Known for: President of the Royal Winnipeg Ballet
- Father: James A. Richardson Sr.
- Relatives: James A. Richardson Jr. (brother); Agnes Benidickson (sister); George T. Richardson (brother)
- Awards: Order of Canada; Order of Manitoba

Kathleen Margaret Richardson, CC OM (May 5, 1928 – September 14, 2019) was a Canadian philanthropist, businesswoman and arts supporter.

== Biography ==
Richardson attended Kelvin High School in Winnipeg and received a B.A. from the University of Manitoba in 1949.

She volunteered in the governance of groups such as the National Executive Committee of the Pan-Am Games Society (1964-1970), Canada Council (1964-1970), Manitoba Arts Council (1969-1973), Institute for Research on Public Policy (1972-1978), The Winnipeg Foundation (1971-1982), Dalnavert Museum (1970-1974 and (2003-2007), Stratford Festival (1983-1986), Winnipeg Art Gallery (1983-1991), Manitoba Government's Education Review Commission (1992), Manitoba Foundations' Council (1999-2001).

Richardson was president of the Royal Winnipeg Ballet from 1957 to 1961 and served as honorary president since 1963. She headed the Kathleen M. Richardson Foundation. In 1973, she was made an Officer of the Order of Canada and was promoted to Companion in 1993. In 2005, she was awarded the Order of Manitoba, and in 2007, the RCA Medal.

She died on September 14, 2019, at the age of 91.
