= George Richardson Memorial Trophy =

Canadian junior ice hockey trophy

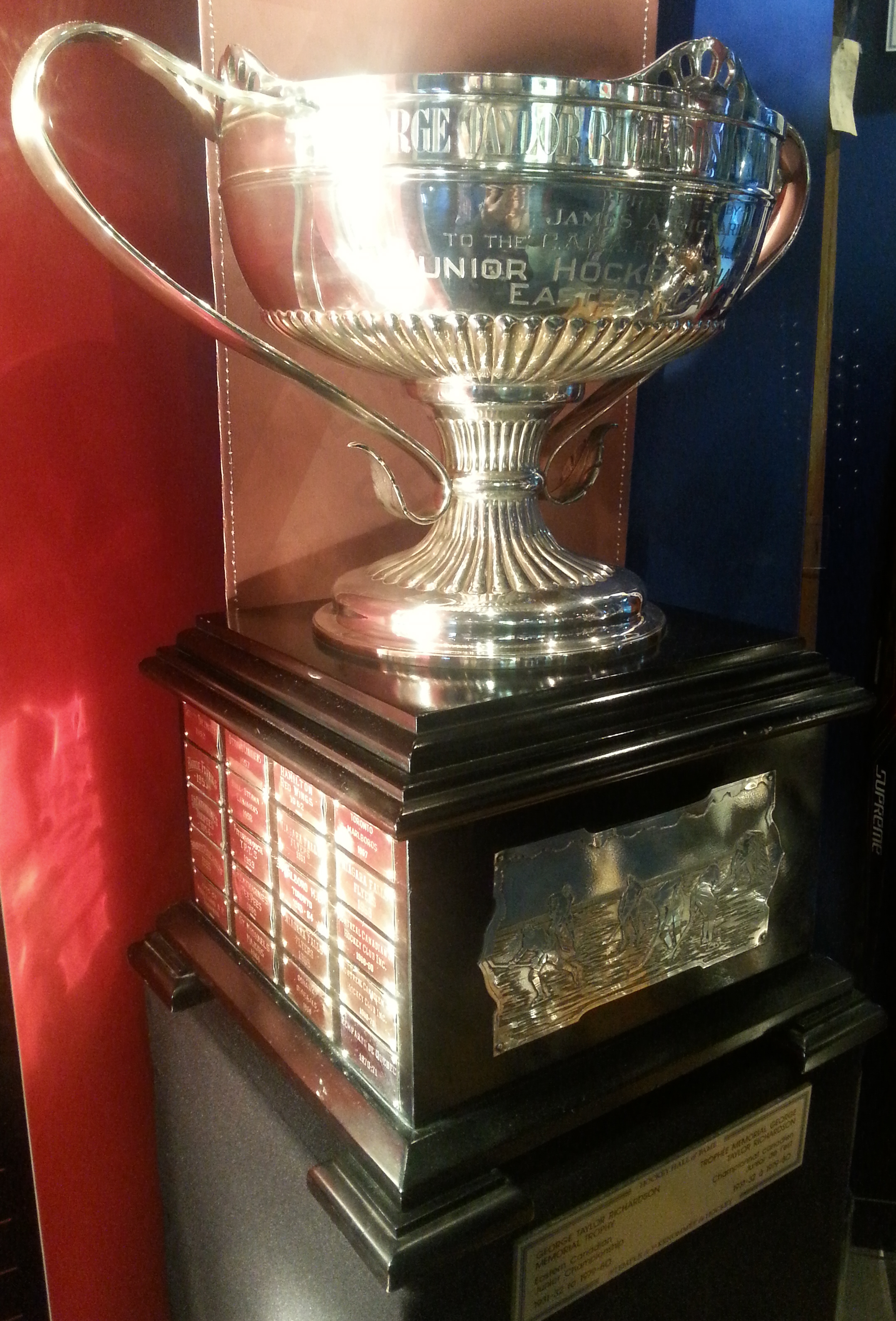
- Sport: Ice hockey
- Awarded for: Eastern Canada champion, and Memorial Cup berth

History
- First award: 1932
- Final award: 1971
- Most recent: Quebec Remparts

The George Richardson Memorial Trophy was presented annually from 1932 until 1971, by the Canadian Amateur Hockey Association. It represented the Eastern Canada junior hockey championship, and a berth in the Memorial Cup final versus the Abbott Cup champion from Western Canada. The George Richardson Memorial Trophy was retired in 1971, when the Memorial Cup became a round-robin series between the winners of the three major junior hockey leagues in Canada; the Western Hockey League, the Ontario Hockey League and Quebec Major Junior Hockey League. The trophy was named for Captain George Taylor Richardson, a hockey player who died while serving in World War I.

== Captain Richardson ==
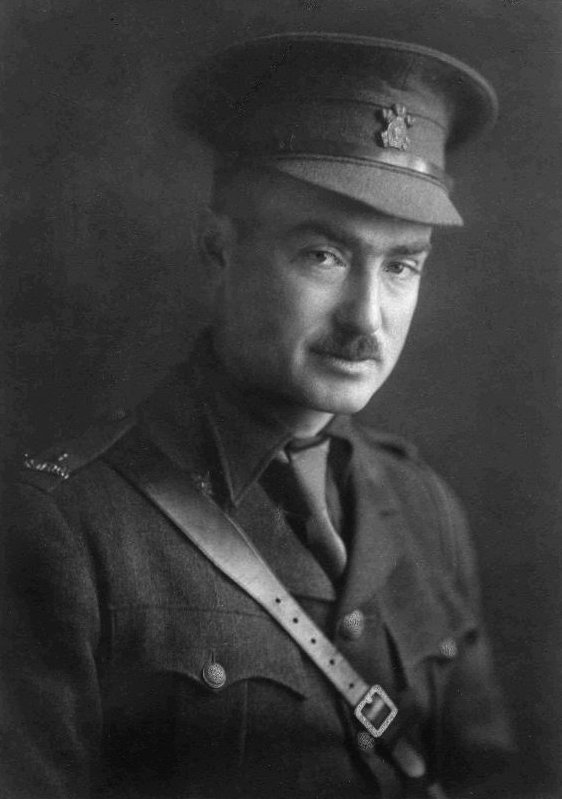
Captain George Taylor Richardson, circa 1914.

Captain George Taylor Richardson (September 14, 1886 – February 9, 1916) was a Canadian ice hockey player, businessman, philanthropist, and later a soldier. Richardson was considered one of the finest amateurs of his time. He played for the Queen's University team that challenged the Ottawa Hockey Club for the 1906 Stanley Cup, and played for the 14th Regiment of Kingston team won the Ontario Hockey Association title, and the J. Ross Robertson Cup in 1908, and the 1909 Allan Cup. He was enshrined in the Hockey Hall of Fame in 1950. Richardson was part of a prominent Kingston, Ontario family that owned and operated James Richardson & Sons. He joined the Canadian Expeditionary Forces in World War I, and died in action in Belgium, and was created a Chevalier of the Legion of Honour of the French Third Republic.

== History ==
The George Richardson Memorial Trophy was donated to the Canadian Amateur Hockey Association (CAHA) by James Armstrong Richardson Sr. in memory of his brother in April 1932. The original three trustees named for the trophy were James T. Sutherland, W. A. Hewitt and Fred Marples.

The trophy was presented annually from 1932 until 1971. It represented the Eastern Canada junior hockey championship, and a berth in the Memorial Cup final versus the Abbott Cup champion from Western Canada. The George Richardson Memorial Trophy was retired in 1971, when the Memorial Cup became a round-robin series between the winners of the three major junior hockey leagues in Canada; the Western Hockey League, the Ontario Hockey League and Quebec Major Junior Hockey League.

=== Playoff format ===
The Eastern Canada junior playoffs were open to the champions from five respective regions. However, league champions did not always participate, and the format varied depending on the number of teams. In the late 1950s, the Junior Canadiens participated as an independent team. Ontario-based teams won the most championships. No team from the Maritimes ever won the George Richardson Memorial Trophy, and the last time a Northern Ontario team won it occurred in 1937.

Region	Association	Won
Southern Ontario	Ontario Hockey Association	31
Northeastern Ontario	Northern Ontario Hockey Association	3
Ottawa Valley	Ottawa District Hockey Association	0
Quebec	Quebec Amateur Hockey Association	4
The Maritimes	Maritime Amateur Hockey Association	0
Independent	Independent Junior Canadiens (1956–1959)	2

=== 1951 series ===
CAHA vice-president W. B. George oversaw the Barrie Flyers versus Quebec Citadelles series for the George Richardson Memorial Trophy, to represent Eastern Canada in the 1951 Memorial Cup playoffs. When the Citadelles refused to play game five in Barrie, George gave them an ultimatum to play or forfeit the series. Quebec decided to play too late to arrive by train, but arrived half an hour late after flying. George scheduled game seven on neutral ice at Maple Leaf Gardens, despite protests from Flyers' coach Hap Emms who claimed that his team only agreed to resume the series if game seven was played in Barrie.

=== 1971 series ===
Ontario Hockey Association (OHA) president Tubby Schmalz announced that teams from the OHA and the Quebec Major Junior Hockey League would not play against any team from the Western Canada Hockey League (WCHL) for the 1971 Memorial Cup, due to disagreements over travel allowances given to team at the Memorial Cup and the higher number of over-age players allowed on WCHL rosters. He said that plans for an Eastern Canada series for the Richardson Trophy would go ahead. That made the 1971 Richardson Cup a potential national championship.

The final Richardson Trophy in 1971 was played between the Quebec Remparts and the St. Catharines Black Hawks, and was controversial due to violence and off-ice disputes causing its abandonment before completion. The series was played when tensions were high between Anglophone Canadians and Francophone nationalists, and featured future NHL stars Guy Lafleur and Marcel Dionne. The series was intended to be best-of-seven, but ended after five games with the Remparts leading three games to two. St. Catharines refused to return to Quebec City due to violence that occurred after game four, and threats from the Front de libération du Québec against its players. CAHA president Earl Dawson declared the series over when no further compromise could be reached. The Quebec Remparts ultimately accepted the challenge by the Western Canada champion Edmonton Oil Kings to play for the Memorial Cup.

== Champions and finalists ==
List of champions and finalists: (number in parentheses denotes total number of championships won by team)

Season	Champion	Total goals	Finalist
1931–32	Sudbury Cub Wolves (1)	4–1	Montreal AAA
1932–33	Newmarket Redmen (1)	3–2	Montreal Royals
1933–34	Toronto St. Michael's Majors (1)	19–4	Charlottetown Abegweits
Season	Champion	Series (W–L–T)	Finalist
1934–35	Sudbury Cub Wolves (2)	2–0	Ottawa Rideaus
1935–36	West Toronto Nationals (1)	2–0	Pembroke Lumber Kings
1936–37	Copper Cliff Redmen (1)	2–0	Ottawa Rideaus
1937–38	Oshawa Generals (1)	2–0	Perth Blue Wings
1938–39	Oshawa Generals (2)	2–1	Verdun Maple Leafs
1939–40	Oshawa Generals (3)	2–0	Verdun Maple Leafs
1940–41	Montreal Royals (1)	3–2	Oshawa Generals
1941–42	Oshawa Generals (4)	4–0	Montreal Royals
1942–43	Oshawa Generals (5)	3–0	Montreal Junior Canadiens
1943–44	Oshawa Generals (6)	3–1	Montreal Royals
1944–45	Toronto St. Michael's Majors (2)	4–2	Montreal Royals
1945–46	Toronto St. Michael's Majors (3)	3–0	Montreal Junior Canadiens
1946–47	Toronto St. Michael's Majors (4)	3–0	Montreal Junior Canadiens
1947–48	Barrie Flyers (1)	3–0	Montreal Nationales
1948–49	Montreal Royals (2)	4–0	Barrie Flyers
1949–50	Montreal Junior Canadiens (1)	4–2	Guelph Biltmores
1950–51	Barrie Flyers (2)	4–3	Quebec Citadelles
1951–52	Guelph Biltmores (1)	4–2	Montreal Junior Canadiens
1952–53	Barrie Flyers (3)	4–1	Quebec Citadelles
1953–54	St. Catharines Teepees (1)	4–2	Quebec Frontenacs
1954–55	Toronto Marlboros (1)	4–1–1	Quebec Frontenacs
1955–56	Toronto Marlboros (2)	4–3–1	Montreal Junior Canadiens
1956–57	Ottawa-Hull Junior Canadiens (2)	4–1–1	Guelph Biltmores
1957–58	Ottawa-Hull Junior Canadiens (3)	4–1	Toronto Marlboros
1958–59	Peterborough Petes (1)	4–2–1	Ottawa-Hull Junior Canadiens
1959–60	St. Catharines Teepees (2)	4–3–1	Brockville Canadiens
1960–61	Toronto St. Michael's Majors (5)	3–0	Moncton Beavers
1961–62	Hamilton Red Wings (1)	4–0	Quebec Citadelles
1962–63	Niagara Falls Flyers (4)	4–0	Espanola Eagles
1963–64	Toronto Marlboros (3)	3–1	Notre-Dame-de-Grace Monarchs
1964–65	Niagara Falls Flyers (5)	3–1	Lachine Maroons
1965–66	Oshawa Generals (7)	3–1	Shawinigan Bruins
1966–67	Toronto Marlboros (4)	3–1	Thetford Mines Canadiens
1967–68	Niagara Falls Flyers (6)	3–2	Verdun Maple Leafs
1968–69	Montreal Junior Canadiens (4)	3–1	Sorel Black Hawks
1969–70	Montreal Junior Canadiens (5)	3–0	Quebec Remparts
1970–71	Quebec Remparts (1)	3–2	St. Catharines Black Hawks

== See also ==
- List of Canadian Hockey League awards
