= James Richardson & Sons =

Canadian agriculture corporation

- Type: Private
- Industry: Agriculture, Food Production, Oil, Financial, Insurance, Logistics
- Founded: 1857
- Headquarters: Richardson Building, Winnipeg, MB R3B 0Y1
- Products: Food Production, Petroleum
- Subsidiaries: Richardson International; Richardson Centre Ltd; Bison Transport; Kingston Midstream; RF Capital Group (Richardson Wealth); Tundra Oil & Gas; Wynward Insurance
- Website: www.jrsl.ca

James Richardson & Sons Limited (JRSL) is a privately-held corporation in Canada that is involved in several industries including agriculture (international grain trade, agribusiness, agri-food), energy, real estate, financial services, investments, and transportation.

Headquartered in Winnipeg, Manitoba, its subsidiaries include Richardson International, which owns Richardson Pioneer, Richardson Oilseed, and Richardson Milling; Richardson Centre Ltd; Kingston Midstream; RF Capital Group, which includes Richardson Wealth; Bison Transport; Tundra Oil & Gas; and Wynward Insurance, as well as its philanthropic arm, the Richardson Foundation.

Founded in 1857 by the eponymous James Richardson, it is the heart of the Richardson family dynasty.

== Agriculture and food processing ==
In the agriculture and agri-food sectors, James Richardson & Sons owns four companies.

=== Richardson International ===
James Richardson & Sons owns Richardson International Ltd. (formerly James Richardson International), the leading agribusiness of Canada, as well as three companies operated under Richardson. Headquartered in Winnipeg, Richardson handles and merchandises Canadian-grown grains and oilseeds, and is a vertically-integrated processor and manufacturer of oats and canola-based products.

One division of Richardson International is Richardson Pioneer Ltd. With its network of high-throughput agribusiness centres in western Canada, it offers such services as seed selection, crop planning, and agronomic support during the growing season.

Richardson Oilseed Ltd., another division, works with canola-based products and is fully integrated through the entire canola supply chain. It is one of the oldest and largest fully integrated crushing, refining, processing, and packaging operations in Canada.

The last division, Richardson Milling Ltd., is a global oat miller with the "most extensive oat supply network in North America."

== Energy ==
=== Tundra Oil & Gas ===
Tundra Oil & Gas Ltd. is the largest oil producer in Manitoba, producing around 30,000 barrels of light crude oil per day. With core properties on the Williston Basin in southwestern Manitoba and southeastern Saskatchewan, the company operates more than 95% of its production and owns approximately 3,500 wells and facilities.

Tundra has three offices:

- Winnipeg (head office) — provides accounting, communications, and land administration in support of the other offices.
- Virden, Manitoba (field office) — oversees daily operations of Tundra's wells and facilities. It provide technical support for all drilling, completions, and "well tie-in activity;" engineering support for "facilities optimization, surface leasing, supply chain management, environmental activities, production accounting, human resources, local information services, and coordination of the company’s safety program."
- Calgary, Alberta (technical office) — provides geological-, geophysical-, and reservoir-engineering support and mineral leasing.

=== Kingston Midstream ===
Kingston Midstream Ltd. (formerly Tundra Energy Marketing Ltd., TEML, until 2019) is a midstream oil and gas company focusing on the movement, storage, marketing, and distribution of petroleum products (crude oil).

The company markets and transports hydrocarbons through an integrated network of gathering pipelines, storage tanks, rail, and truck terminals.

Its pipeline business consists of 2,328 kilometres (1,447 mi) of pipeline gathering systems that transport crude oil from the Williston Basin in Manitoba and Saskatchewan. The systems in Manitoba include those in Cromer, Waskada, and Virden, which deliver product to the Cromer Terminal. which in turn is delivered to the Enbridge Mainline System or to Kingston Midstream’s Rail Loading Facility.

TEML was incorporated in 2011, and began operating as a wholly-owned subsidiary of Tundra Oil & Gas in 2012. In 2013, it acquired EOG Resources' stake in the Waskada pipeline. In 2015, TEML acquired the Virden System from Enbridge for $26 million; and in 2016, it completed the acquisition of the Enbridge Saskatchewan Pipeline System for $1.07 billion. In 2019, TEML was renamed Kingston Midstream, named after Kingston, Ontario, where JRSL was founded.

== Financial services ==
JRSL owns three companies in the financial services sector:

- RF Capital Group
  - Richardson Wealth
- Wynward Insurance Group

It also used to own Richardson Securities (later Richardson Greenshields), the last of Canada's large independent brokerage houses, which was acquired by RBC Dominion Securities in 1996.

=== RF Capital Group ===
Richardson Wealth (known as Patrimoine Richardson in Quebec; formerly Richardson GMP) is one of the leading independent wealth management firms in Canada.

It is owned by RF Capital Group Inc. (formerly GMP Capital Inc), a public company listed on the Toronto Stock Exchange (TSX) whose sole focus is on growing Richardson Wealth.

==== History ====
RF Capital was founded in 1995 as Griffiths McBurney & Partners, and became GMP Capital Corp. in 2003, when it went public in a $110,000,000 IPO.

In 2005, GMP Capital began operations of its private wealth management firm, GMP Private Client L.P. In 2009, GMP Private Client L.P. combined with Richardson Partners Financial Ltd to form Richardson GMP, creating "one of Canada's pre-eminent, independent wealth management firms."

In 2013, Richardson GMP significantly expanded its business scale upon its acquisition of Macquarie Private Wealth Inc. (Canada) for $132 million. On 26 September 2016, RF Capital (then GMP Capital) completed its acquisition of FirstEnergy Capital Corp. On 6 December 2019, GMP Capital completed the sale of its capital markets business to Stifel Financial, as well as intending to consolidate 100% of ownership in Richardson GMP under GMP.

On 6 October 2020, GMP Capital changed the company name to RF Capital Group Inc. Fourteen days later, GMP Capital completed consolidation of Richardson GMP under GMP, and on November 16, Richardson GMP began operating as Richardson Wealth.

=== Wynward Insurance ===
Wynward Insurance Group is an insurance provider available in all provinces and territories of Canada.

The company offers coverage for the amusement industry, business and professional services, the cannabis industry, commercial agriculture, contractors, cyber security, professional liability, "equipment breakdowns," faith-based and charitable organizations, manufacturing, non-profit directors and officers liability, retail, and for wellness and fitness facilities, as well as umbrella insurance.

Insurance Business Magazine’s annual list of Five-Star Carrier ranks Wynward as second among Canada's top-performing insurance carriers. A.M. Best Company gave Wynward a "Financial Strength Rating" of 'A' and "Issuer Credit Rating" of 'a'.

Wynward has several offices; its head office is located in Winnipeg, and serves Manitoba, Alberta, BC, and northwestern Ontario. Its regional offices include one in Regina, serving Saskatchewan; one in London, Ontario, serving Ontario and Quebec; and one in Halifax, serving Atlantic Canada.

== Other subsidiaries ==
=== Bison Transport ===
Bison Transport is a transportation company headquartered in Winnipeg, Manitoba, serving Canada and 48 nearby U.S. states.

As a "leading asset-based freight solutions provider with a network of terminals throughout North America," Bison has a fleet of more than 2,100 tractors and 6,000 trailers, and is one of the largest carriers in Canada today. JRSL announced its acquisition of Bison in 2021.

=== Richardson Centre ===
Richardson Centre, owned by Richardson Centre Ltd., is a complex located at Winnipeg's Portage and Main intersection that includes the 34-storey Richardson Building, the Richardson Centre Concourse, the Richardson Centre Parkade, and the 8-storey office building at 161 Portage Avenue East. The Richardson Building, in particular, serves as the headquarters of James Richardson & Sons Limited and its subsidiaries.

1965 was when JRSL first announced plans to build the complex on the corner of Portage and Main. The complex opened in 1969. Property management and operation of Richardson Centre is the responsibility of BentallGreenOak.

=== Richardson Foundation ===
The Richardson Foundation Inc. is the philanthropic arm of James Richardson & Sons and its affiliated companies in Canada, and is the channel through which these companies make their charitable donations.

The Foundation was established as the Richardson Century Fund in 1957, initiated in commemoration of the 100th anniversary of JRSL. Its main function is to support registered Canadian charitable organizations in the visual and performing arts, education, youth initiatives, and environmental issues, as well as special support to United Way. It does not provide support to healthcare or healthcare initiatives, religious/sectarian organizations, and conferences or seminars.

== History ==
The Richardson family has been synonymous with the grain industry in western Canada from the early days of European settlement to the present. James Richardson came to Canada from Ireland in 1822 or 1823. He started in Kingston, Ontario, with a tailor shop, and when he took payment in grain, he was forced into the grain business. Giving up his tailor shop, he and his two sons — George Armstrong and Henry Westman — formed James Richardson and Sons in 1857, ten years prior to the Confederation of Canada.

In 1867, the company purchased its first schooner ship to transport grain from Canadian farmers to American buyers. By 1868, James Richardson and Sons acquired enough capital to purchase a wharf and warehouse on the Kingston waterfront. Richardson began building their first grain elevator in 1882 in Kingston, which was finished in 1883 whereupon the company began shipping across the prairies on the newly completed Canadian railway. Also in 1883, James Richardson became the first to arrange the initial shipment of wheat from western Canada through the lake system to Liverpool, England. Another elevator was built at Neepawa, Manitoba, in 1890. By this time, JRSL had hired its first female employee.

In the 1890s, the company relocated to Winnipeg Grain Exchange. In 1897, George opened a branch office in Toronto. Soon after, in 1910, James Richardson and Sons opened a location in Vancouver, followed shortly by Calgary, Saskatoon, Medicine Hat, and Lethbridge. In 1912, George's son, James Armstrong Richardson (I), was made Vice-President of the company. The following year, JRSL established the Pioneer Grain Company Ltd. to operate the company's expanding collection of western country grain elevators.

In 1917, JRSL constructed Richardson Terminal in Port Arthur. The Terminal would unload its first railcar of grain from the Prairies on 3 January 1919. Also that year, James Armstrong Richardson Sr. became President of the company.

In 1925, James Richardson & Sons established a radio station in Moose Jaw with the call sign CJRM-AM. The radio business was exited in the 1940s, and is now 620 CKRM in Regina. In 1926, JRSL joined the Montreal Stock Exchange and a year later, acquired the Wall Street brokerage of E. A. Pierce & Co.

In 1930, James Armstrong founded Western Canada Airways (later Canadian Airways), Canada's first commercial carrier. (It was founded in 1926, but was fully established in 1930.) The two were later absorbed by Canadian Pacific Air Lines in 1942.

Following James Armstrong's unexpected death in 1939, his wife Muriel Sprague Richardson became JRSL's fifth President in 1940. As the first woman to run a major Canadian corporation, she oversaw JRSL's operations for the next 27 years. In 1954, JRSL established Marine Pipeline Construction of Canada in Calgary, which would later go on to build the first 42-inch pipeline and the first commercial natural gas pipeline north of the 60th parallel. At the height of the Cold War, JRSL was able to land a $20-million grain sale to China, ending a long-standing ban by the Communist government on Western imports.

James and Muriel's son, George Taylor Richardson (GTR; named after his uncle), was appointed president in 1966, while his elder brother, James Armstrong Richardson Jr., was named chairman (later becoming a minister in the Pierre Trudeau government). Soon after, the company began putting its efforts towards repatriating the Hudson's Bay Company (HBC), which was still chartered as a British corporation, with its board based in London. Upon the consummation of the deal, on HBC's 300th anniversary, GTR became its first Canadian governor. (In 1979, however, the Richardson family ultimately sold their holdings for $38.50 per share.)

In 1979, the 112,000-tonne Pioneer Grain port terminal was officially opened in Vancouver's north shore. In 1986, JRSL purchased 50% of Tundra Oil & Gas, which would later become a wholly-owned subsidiary in 2000.

With GTR's retirement as CEO in 1993, his son Hartley Richardson took the lead, with his cousin James Armstrong Richardson Jr. as vice-president. In 1999, James Richardson International acquired Canbra Foods Ltd., a fully integrated canola processing and packaging facility in Lethbridge, Alberta.

The Winnipeg James Armstrong Richardson International Airport was opened in 2011, named in honour of James Richardson the first. In 2021, JRSL announced its acquisition of Bison Transport, a Canadian transport company that operates throughout North America.

== Leadership ==
Presidents and chairman have been:

=== President ===
1. James Richardson, 1857–1892
2. George Algernon Richardson, 1892–1906
3. Henry Westman Richardson, 1906–1918
4. James Armstrong Richardson Sr., 1919–1939
5. Muriel Sprague Richardson, 1939–1966
6. George Taylor Richardson, 1966–1993
7. Hartley Thorbjorn Richardson, 1993–2025
8. Thor R. Richardson, 2025–president

=== Chairman of the Board ===
1. James Armstrong Richardson Jr., 1966–1968
2. George Taylor Richardson, 1993–2000
3. Carolyn Anne Richardson Hursh, 2000–2021
4. Daniel Richardson Hursh, 2025–president
