= Henry Westman Richardson =

Canadian politician

The Honourable Henry Westman Richardson
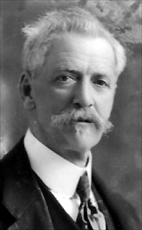

Canadian Senator from Ontario
- In office January 22, 1917 – October 27, 1918

Personal details
- Born: July 21, 1855 Kingston, Canada West
- Died: October 27, 1918 (aged 63) Kingston, Ontario, Canada
- Spouse: Alice Ford (m. 1885)

Henry Westman Richardson (July 21, 1855 – October 27, 1918) was a Canadian businessman and member of the Senate of Canada.

He was the head of James Richardson and Sons, a commodities firm based in Kingston, Ontario that was founded by his father which handled virtually all of Canada's grain exports to the United Kingdom during World War I. Richardson became president of the firm following the death of his brother, in 1906. He was president until his own death in 1918.

Richardson also sat on the boards of directors of several railway companies as well as Dominion Canneries. He was a member of the Boards of Trade in Toronto, Montreal and Winnipeg. He was an Alderman in Kingston and President of the Board of Education.

He was appointed to the Senate of Canada on 22 January 1917 and sat as a Conservative until his death a year later.

== Early life ==
Henry Westman (a misspelling of Wartman) Richardson was born the son of James Richardson and Susannah Wartman on 21 July 1855 in Kingston. He attended Kingston Collegiate Institute. On 14 April 1885, he married Alice Ford, daughter of R.G. Ford of Kingston. Together they had three daughters and three sons.

== Business career ==
Richardson was involved in a number of business, and educational organizations, as follows:

- J. Richardson and Sons Limited - President 1906-1918
- Kingston, Portsmouth & Cataraqui Electric Railway - President
- Kingston Feldspar and Mining Company - President and General Manager
- Dominion Canners. Limited - Director
- North American Smelting Company - president and general manager
- Travelers Life Assurance Company of Canada - Officer and Shareholders' Director
- Kingston Hosiery Limited - President
- Kingston Street Railway Company - President
- Mississquoi Marble Company - President
- Phillipsburg Railway Company - President
- Kingston Board of Trade - President
- Liquor License Commissioner - 1911
- City Council Kingston, 1892
- Cataraqui Golf and Country Club - President
- School of Mining, Kingston - Governor
- Kingston Yacht Association - President
- Board of Education, Kingston

== Political career ==
Appointed on the advice of Robert Laird Borden, Richardson was summoned to the Senate of Canada on 22 January 1917. He was a Conservative and a member of the Standing Committee on Railways, Telegraphs and Harbours and a member of Standing Joint Committee on the Library of Parliament.

=== Post war Empire ===
In anticipation of the end of World War I, Ontario Premier, Sir William Hearst, asked, "In the day when Canada has a population equal to the British Isles, does any suggest that she should leave the question of peace and war to a Parliament over which she has no control?". As a result a number of Senators, including Richardson, signed an agreement to define the role of Canada in a post-war Imperial Age. The agreement including these ideas:

- Canada strengthened its ties to Great Britain by participating in WWI
- Effective Empire government must not sacrifice domestic policy nor surrender fiscal responsibility.
- The Dominions need to share defense of the Empire and should have a voice in policy with other states.
- Political leaders throughout the Empire should meet to discuss the ideas.

As the war had not concluded, Ontario Liberal Leader, N.W. Rowell, advised that the priority should be save the Empire first and plan to reorganize it after the war.

== Death ==
Richardson died suddenly from angina pectoris on 27 October 1918.

In December 1918, the Kingston Hosiery Company entered into voluntary liquidation as Richardson was the principal stockholder and his son did not wish to continue the business of the company.

His nephew, James Armstrong Richardson, Sr., became president of James Richardson and Sons in 1919.
