= Richardson Stadium =

Richardson Stadium may refer to:

- Richardson Stadium (Davidson), Davidson, North Carolina, United States
- Richardson Stadium (Kingston), Kingston, Ontario, Canada

== See also ==
- Jerry Richardson Stadium, Charlotte, North Carolina, United States
