= Benidickson =

Benidickson is a surname. Notable people with the surname include:

- Agnes Benidickson (1920–2007), Canadian university chancellor
- William Moore Benidickson (1911–1985), Canadian politician
