= Bison Transport =

Canadian trucking company

Bison Transport Inc
- Company type: Private
- Founded: May 28, 1969; 56 years ago
- Founder: Duncan Jessiman
- Headquarters: 1001 Sherwin Rd, Winnipeg, Manitoba
- Key people: alex Lloyd, President & CEO; Don Streuber, Executive Chairman
- Total assets: 2,150 tractors, 6,000 trailers, and 600 containers
- Number of employees: 3,700+
- Parent: James Richardson & Sons
- Website: www.bisontransport.com

Bison Transport is one of Canada's largest trucking companies.

Based in Winnipeg, Manitoba, Canada, Bison Transport was incorporated in 1969 by owner Duncan M. Jessiman. Bison has since grown from 18 tractors and 32 employees to over 2100 trucks and 6000 trailers with over 3700 employees and contractors.

Bison Transport operates 6 key terminal hubs in Canada, located in Winnipeg, Mississauga, Edmonton, Calgary, Regina, and Langley. The company provides cross-border truckload transportation from British Columbia through the Maritimes and to 48 U.S. states.

Bison's divisions include Dry Van, Long Combination Vehicle (LCV), Refrigerated, Intermodal, Asset-Based Logistics, Less Than Truckload, and Warehousing and Distribution. The company was recognised as the "Best Fleet to Drive For" by the Truckload Carriers Association and CarriersEdge in 2018.

Bison Transport was acquired by James Richardson & Sons on 5 January 2021.

== History ==
Bison Transport was established on 28 May 1969 by Duncan M. Jessiman, starting with 18 trucks operated by 32 employees in Winnipeg. The following year, Bison made its first acquisition, R.C. Owen Transport, followed by Echo Transport in 1979 before expanding into the United States in 1981.

In 1991, Bison entered the retail sector, establishing a long-term relationship with Walmart. It expanded into warehousing in Winnipeg in 1996 and later opened facilities in Regina, Edmonton and Calgary. The company entered the flat-deck segment in 2014 after buying Searcy Transport in Winnipeg.

On 5 January 2021, James Richardson & Sons purchased Bison Transport.
