= 253rd (Queen's University) Highland Battalion, CEF =

Canadian university battalion in World War I

The 253rd (University Highland) Battalion, CEF, was a unit in the Canadian Expeditionary Force during the First World War. Based in Kingston, Ontario, the unit began recruiting in mid-autumn of 1916, primarily among university students from throughout Canada. After sailing to England in May 1917 on the troopship Olympic, the unit was absorbed by the 5th Reserve Battalion, CEF, later that month. The 253rd Battalion had one officer commanding: Lieutenant-Colonel P. G. C. Campbell.

In 1920 the perpetuation of the 253rd Battalion was assigned to the Kingston Regiment (Princess of Wales' Own), which became the Princess of Wales' Own Regiment in 1936.

In 1929, the battalion was awarded the theatre of war honour "The Great War, 1917".
