= 59th Battalion (Ontario), CEF =

Canadian infantry battalion

The 59th Battalion (Ontario), CEF was an infantry battalion of the Canadian Expeditionary Force during the Great War. The 59th Battalion was authorized on 20 April 1915 and embarked for Britain on 1 April 1916. It provided reinforcements for the Canadian Corps in the field until 6 July 1916, when its personnel were absorbed by the 39th Battalion, CEF. The battalion was disbanded on 21 May 1917. The 59th Battalion recruited in Eastern Ontario and Hull, Quebec and was mobilized at Barriefield (now CFB Kingston), Ontario.

The 59th Battalion was commanded by Lt.-Col. H.J. Dawson from 1 April to 11 August 1916. .

The 59th Battalion was awarded the battle honour THE GREAT WAR 1916.

The 59th Battalion, CEF is perpetuated by The Princess of Wales' Own Regiment.

== Sources ==
- Canadian Expeditionary Force 1914-1919 by Col. G.W.L. Nicholson, CD, Queen's Printer, Ottawa, Ontario, 1962
