= Princess of Wales' Own Regiment =

Coordinates: 44.2340°N 76.4852°W

The Princess of Wales' Own Regiment
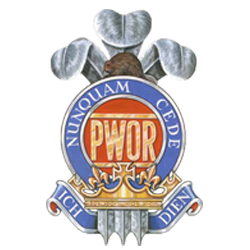
- Cap badge
- Active: January 16, 1863 – present
- Country: Province of Canada (1863–1867); Canada (1867–present)
- Branch: Primary Reserves
- Type: Line infantry
- Role: Light role
- Size: One battalion
- Part of: Royal Canadian Infantry Corps
- Garrison/HQ: Kingston, Ontario
- Nickname: The P-Dubs
- Mottos: Nunquam cede (Latin for 'Never yield'); Ich dien (German for 'I serve') (Prince of Wales' motto)
- March: Quick: "The Buffs"
- Engagements: Fenian Raids; Second Boer War; First World War; War in Afghanistan

Commanders
- Current commander: LCol Sean McDonaugh

The Princess of Wales' Own Regiment (PWOR) is a Primary Reserve infantry regiment of the Canadian Army.

== Lineage ==
Regimental colour

Camp flag
- Originated on 16 January 1863, as the 14th Battalion, Volunteer Militia Rifles of Canada. Headquarters in Kingston, Canada West, with companies in Kingston and Portsmouth.
- Redesignated on 12 June 1868, as the 14th Battalion, The Princess of Wales’ Own Rifles.
- Redesignated on 8 May 1900, as the 14th Regiment, The Princess of Wales’ Own Rifles.
- Redesignated on 15 March 1920, as The Kingston Regiment (The Princess of Wales’ Own).
- Redesignated on 1 April 1921, as The Princess of Wales’ Own Regiment.
- Amalgamated on 15 December 1936, with A Company, The Frontenac Regiment and “A” Company, 4th Machine Gun Battalion, CMGC and redesignated as The Princess of Wales’ Own Regiment (Machine Gun).
- Redesignated on 1 April 1946, as The Princess of Wales’ Own Regiment.

== Perpetuations ==
=== War of 1812 ===
The Princess of Wales' Own Regiment perpetuates the Battalion of Incorporated Militia of Upper Canada, the 1st Regiment of Addington Militia, the 1st Regiment of Frontenac Militia and the 1st Regiment of Lennox Militia.

=== Great War ===
The Princess of Wales' Own Regiment perpetuates the 21st Battalion (Eastern Ontario), CEF, the 59th Battalion (Ontario), CEF and 253rd Battalion (Queen's University Highland), CEF.

== History ==
The regiment was created on 16 January 1863, as the 14th Battalion Volunteer Militia Rifles of Canada from the amalgamation of Kingston's seven independent rifle companies. Shortly after the wedding of the Prince of Wales (later Edward VII) to Princess Alexandra of Denmark, the regiment asked for and was given permission to become The Princess of Wales’ Own Regiment.

During the Fenian Raid of 1866, when the Irish extremists attempted to influence British policy by attacking Canada, the regiment was called to active duty, both to Niagara and later to Cornwall. The band mace presented to the regiment by its officers "In Remembrance of Cornwall" is in the museum.

In 1885, during the North-West Rebellion the PWOR was again activated, but not for field service in the West. It was assigned to garrison duties at Tete-du-Pont Barracks (now Fort Frontenac) and Fort Henry.

The Second Boer War, in South Africa, in 1899, again members volunteered for active service. A number of members served in various units and because of the 14th’s contribution, “South Africa, 1900” became the first battle honour. A PWOR officer, Major Wallace Bruce Matthews Carruthers, made his own way to South Africa, after being turned down for South Africa service, in Canada. He was "signed-on" as a lieutenant and distinguished himself sufficiently that he was asked to join the regular force. When he returned to Canada, he was asked to set up the Canadian Signal Corps.

The outbreak of World War I in 1914, resulted in a response by members of the regiment. Very quickly a contingent of 80 men was formed under Captain George T. Richardson, (for whom George Richardson Stadium in Kingston is named—he became the PWOR’s first officer fatality) and sent to the 2nd (Eastern Ontario Regiment) Battalion Canadian Expeditionary Force (CEF), of the 1st Canadian Division, which was part of Canada’s First Contingent. At the same time, the 21st Battalion, CEF was formed in Kingston, under the commanding officer of the PWOR, Lieutenant-Colonel St Pierre Hughes. The PWOR also contributed officers and men to the 59th, 146th, and 253rd Battalions, CEF.

The 21st Battalion earned eighteen battle honours in three years of frontline service. A great deal of the 21st Battalion history, including its colours, is in the PWOR museum. The mascot of the Princess of Wales' Own Regiment during the Great War, a white goat named Nan, retired to the Royal Military College of Canada stables in 1918. Nan died on September 22, 1924, at 12 years of age. She was buried in the Cataraqui Cemetery

In 1920, in the post war re-organization of the Militia, the 14th Battalion Rifles was re-designated as a line infantry regiment so that it could carry the battle honours and colours of the 21st Battalion, CEF (A rifle regiment carries its battle honours on its drums).

The Princess of Wales’ Own Regiment became allied on 15 July 1926 with the South Lancashire Regiment (Prince of Wales’ Volunteers), who count among their battle honours Louisburg and Niagara. In the mid-1960s, the South Lancashire Regiment was amalgamated with other Lancashire regiments to form the present allied regiment, the Queen's Lancashire Regiment.

In the Second World War, the decision was made not to mobilize the regiment, because of the heavy losses suffered in the First World War. Instead, it provided one complete company to the Stormont, Dundas and Glengarry Highlanders (Glens), which went under canvas at the Kingston fairgrounds. The Glens went ashore on D-Day under a PWOR officer, Lieutenant-Colonel GH Christiansen, as part of the 9th Canadian Infantry Brigade, commanded by another PWOR officer, Brigadier-General Douglas Gordon Cunningham.

In June 1942, the 1st battalion PWOR was formed under Lieutenant-Colonel E Cockburn, and it served in Sherbrooke, Quebec, and Debert, Nova Scotia, where it was deployed for east coast defence. All told, the regiment supplied 1500 men for active service including one brigadier, four colonels and eight lieutenant-colonels.

In 1963, the PWOR celebrated its centennial, and was granted freedom of the City of Kingston. It was presented with the new colours by the Lieutenant Governor, the Honorable Earl Rowe. On the colours was emblazoned the badge of the Stormont, Dundas and Glengarry Highlanders, 1939–1945, commemorating the service of PWOR members in that regiment.

The PWOR went through a decline during the 1970s and 1980s, where a measure of a unit’s success was simply the ability to remain active and keep off the increasing list of units relegated to the Supplementary Order of Battle. The regiment was reduced to a minor unit, with only one authorized company for most of the 1970s, until finally in 1978, it was again elevated to major unit status.

In 1895, the regimental quarter master represented Canada at Bisley. His rifle and some of his winnings are on display in the museum. More recently a member of the unit was part of the 1990 Canadian Forces Bisley Team and a member of the unit's cadet corps distinguished herself on the same ranges.

Today, the regiment is composed of men and women from all walks of life including students, policemen and farmers. Members of the regiment have distinguished themselves on recent peacekeeping tours in Cyprus and the former republics of Yugoslavia.

Members of the regiment have also served on combat missions in Afghanistan during Operation Medusa.

The Freedom of the City was exercised by the Princess of Wales' Own Regiment in Kingston 4 May 2013.

The Princess of Wales’ Own Regiment maintains itself as an effective component of the ‘Total Force’ army, preparing to fulfill its role, if called upon, as a first rate infantry unit of the Army's Primary Reserve.

Lineage chart

1812	Bn of Incorporated Militia of Upper Canada	1st Regt of Addington Militia	1st Regt of Frontenac Militia	1st Regt of Lennox Militia
1815	Disbanded	Disbanded	Disbanded	Disbanded
1855	Independent rifle coys
1863	The 14th Bn Volunteer Militia Rifles, Canada
1866	Active service (Note: March)
1868	14th Bn, "The Princess of Wales' Own Rifles"
1900	14th Regt "The Princess of Wales' Own Rifles"
1914	21st Bn, CEF
1915	59th "Overseas" Bn, CEF
1916	Absorbed by 39th "Overseas" Bn
1917	253rd "Overseas" Infy Bn, CEF
1917	Absorbed by 5th Reserve Bn
1920	Disbanded	1st Bn (21st Bn, CEF), The Kingston Regt (The Princess of Wales' Own)	2nd Bn (59th Bn, CEF), (Note: Reserve) The Kingston Regt (The Princess of Wales' Own)	3rd Bn (253rd Bn, CEF), The Kingston Regt (The Princess of Wales' Own)
1921	1st Bn (21st Bn, CEF), The Princess of Wales' Own Regt	2nd Bn (59th Bn, CEF), The Princess of Wales' Own Regt	3rd Bn (253rd Bn, CEF), The Princess of Wales' Own Regt	4th Bn (14th Bn, Canadian Militia), The Princess of Wales' Own Regt
A Coy, The Frontenac Regt	A Coy, 4th MG Bn, CMGC
1936	The Princess of Wales' Own Regt (MG)	Disbanded	Disbanded	Disbanded
1942	1st Bn, The Princess of Wales' Own Regt (MG), CASF	2nd (Reserve) Bn, The Princess of Wales' Own Regt (MG)
1943	1st Bn, The Princess of Wales' Own Regt, CIC, CASF
1943	Disbanded
1944	The Princess of Wales' Own Regt (MG) (Reserve)
1946	The Princess of Wales' Own Regt
2012	Perpetuates War of 1812 units

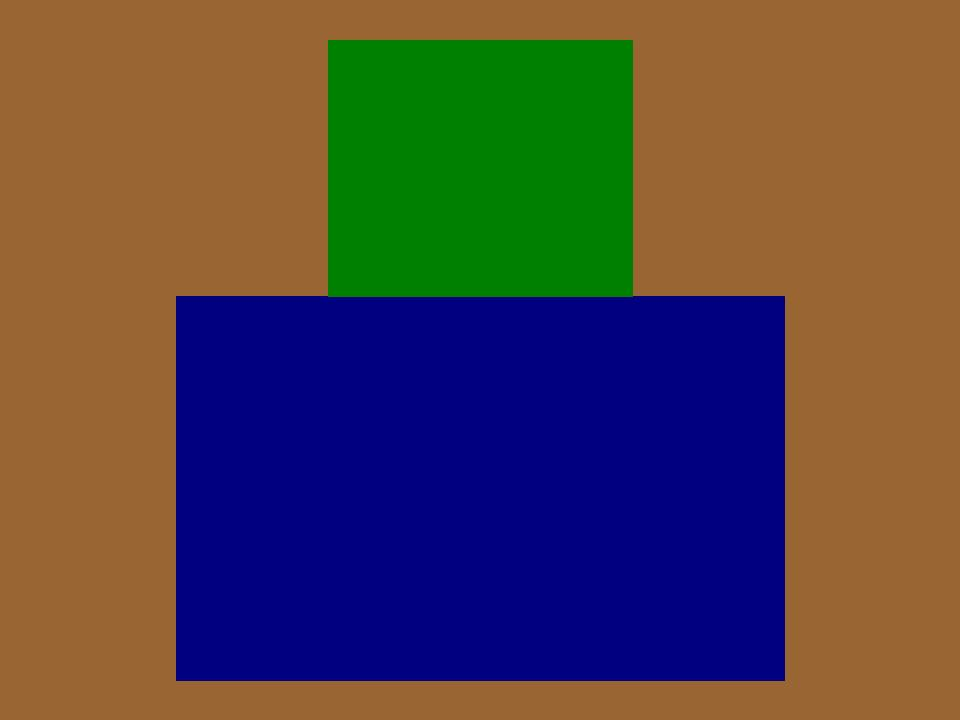
The distinguishing patch of the 21st Battalion (Eastern Ontario), CEF.

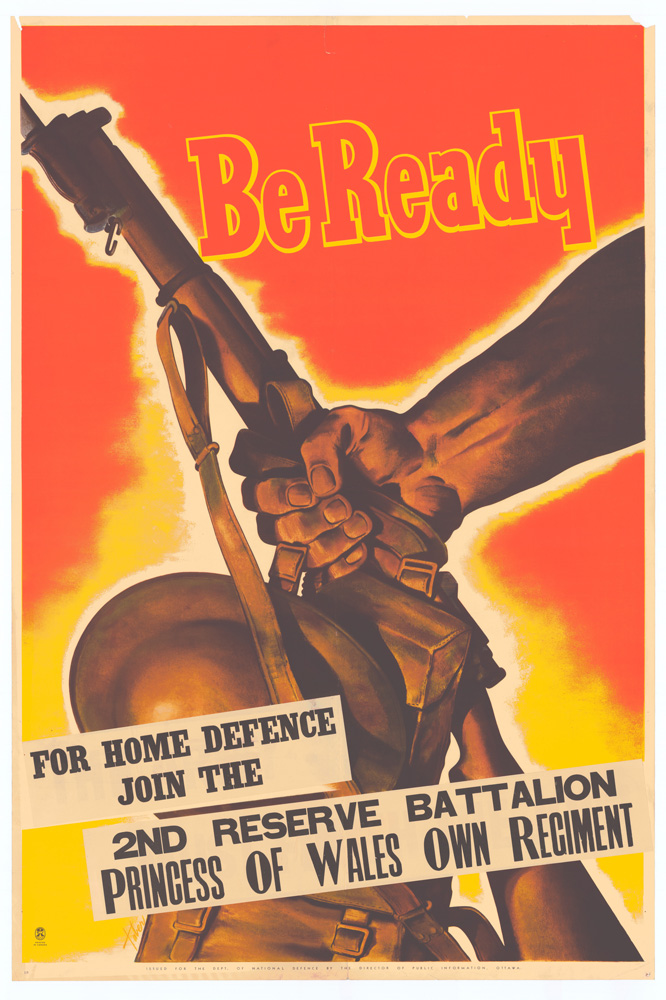
Princess of Wales' Own Regiment war recruitment poster

== Operational history ==
=== Fenian Raids ===
The battalion was called out on active service on 8 March 1866, remaining on active service until on 31 March 1866.

=== South African War ===
The regiment did not fight in the Boer War in South Africa, but contributed volunteers for the various Canadian Contingents.

=== Great War ===
Details of the regiment were placed on active service on 6 August 1914 for local protection duties.

The 21st Battalion (Eastern Ontario), CEF, was authorized on 14 October 1914 and embarked for Britain on 6 May 1915, disembarking in France on 15 September 1915, where it fought as part of the 4th Infantry Brigade, 2nd Canadian Division in France and Flanders until the end of the war. The battalion was disbanded on 30 August 1920.

The 59th Battalion (Ontario), CEF, was authorized on 20 April 1915 and embarked for Britain on 1 April 1916, where it provided reinforcements for the Canadian Corps in the field until 6 July 1916, when its personnel were absorbed by the 39th Battalion, CEF. The battalion was disbanded on 21 May 1917.

The 253rd (Queen's University) Highland Battalion, CEF, was authorized on 1 May 1916, began recruiting in mid-autumn of 1916, and embarked for Britain on 29 April 1917. On 18 May 1917, its personnel were absorbed by the 5th Reserve Battalion, CEF, to provide reinforcements for the Canadian Corps in the field. The battalion was disbanded on 8 December 1917.

=== Second World War ===
Details from the regiment were called out on service on 26 August 1939 and then placed on active service on 1 September 1939, as The Princess of Wales' Own Regiment (Machine Gun), CASF (Details), for local protection duties. These details were disbanded on 31 December 1940.

The regiment provided No. 1 Company of The Stormont, Dundas and Glengarry Highlanders, CASF, for active service on 24 May 1940. The regiment subsequently mobilized the 1st Battalion, The Princess of Wales' Own Regiment (Machine Gun), CASF, on 12 May 1942. It was redesignated the 1st Battalion, The Princess of Wales' Own Regiment, CIC, CASF, on 19 July 1943. It served in Canada in a home defence role as part of Military District No. 4. The battalion was disbanded on 15 October 1943.

=== War in Afghanistan ===
The regiment contributed an aggregate of more than 20% of its authorized strength to the various Task Forces which served in Afghanistan between 2002 and 2014.

== Alliances ==
- United Kingdom – Duke of Lancaster's Regiment (King's Lancashire and Border)

== Battle honours and honorary distinctions ==
Regimental colour, which includes the cyphers of two former princesses of Wales: Alexandra and Diana

In the list below, battle honours in capitals were awarded for participation in large operations and campaigns, while those in lowercase indicate honours granted for more specific battles. Battle honours in Bold Type are emblazoned on the regimental colour.

=== War of 1812 ===
- Defence of Canada – 1812–1815 – Défense du Canada
- Niagara

Honorary distinction: the non-emblazonable honorary distinction Defence of Canada – 1812–1815 – Défense du Canada

=== Boer War ===
- South Africa, 1900

=== Great War ===
- Mount Sorrel
- Somme, 1916, '18
- Flers–Courcelette
- Thiepval
- Ancre Heights
- Arras, 1917, '18
- Vimy, 1917
- Hill 70
- Ypres, 1917
- Passchendaele
- Amiens
- Scarpe, 1918
- Drocourt–Quéant
- Hindenburg Line
- Canal du Nord
- Cambrai, 1918
- Pursuit to Mons
- France and Flanders, 1915–18

=== Second World War ===
Honorary distinction: the badge of the Stormont, Dundas and Glengarry Highlanders (SD&G Highrs), with the dates 1944–1945, for jointly mobilizing the unit for service in Europe.

=== War in Afghanistan ===
- Afghanistan

== Media ==
Captain Herbert W. McBride, who served with the 21st Battalion, wrote two books about his experiences during the Great War as a sniper and machine gunner: A Rifleman Went to War and The Emma Gees.

== Band ==
The PWOR Foundation maintains the Pipes and Drums of the Foundation. This band is made up entirely of volunteers, although some are serving members of the Canadian Armed Forces, most are civilian members with musical capabilities. The band supports the foundation and the local community.

== Memorials ==
In May 1917, the officers of the 21st Battalion had a cross built to commemorate their comrades lost in the hard fighting for Vimy Ridge. Private George Williams, a carpenter, salvaged wood from the battlefield to make the cross, 10 feet (3.05 m) high and 3 feet (0.91 m) across, which was painted white and bore a metal plaque, "In Memory of the Officers, NCOs and Men; 21st Canadian Infantry Battalion Killed in Action April 9th 1917". The cross was originally erected near Thélus, France. The cross was erected in Sanctuary Wood, and then later on the grounds of the Royal Military College of Canada in the early 1920s. In 1992–1994 the cross was refurbished and moved into the West wall, Regimental Armouries, 100 Montreal Street, with the 21st Battalion cap badge at its foot and surrounded by the regiment's 19 then-current battle honours. During services held by the regiment and association every April, the name of every 21st Battalion soldier killed at Vimy is read aloud.

== Princess of Wales' Own Regiment Military Museum ==
The Princess of Wales' Own Regiment Military Museum
- Location: The Armouries 100 Montreal Street Kingston, ON K7K 3E8, Canada
- Type: Regimental Museum
- Website: pwor.ca

The museum collects and conserves military artifacts pertaining to the regiment, its antecedents and other militia or military organizations whose roots are found in Kingston. The museum displays artifacts appropriately to members of the military and community in order to foster a better understanding of the military heritage of Kingston’s citizen soldiers in peace and war. The museum serves as a resource for the teaching of military history both to the members of the Regiment and to the public. The Kingston Armouries is a Classified Federal Heritage Building 1989 on the Register of the Government of Canada Heritage Buildings.

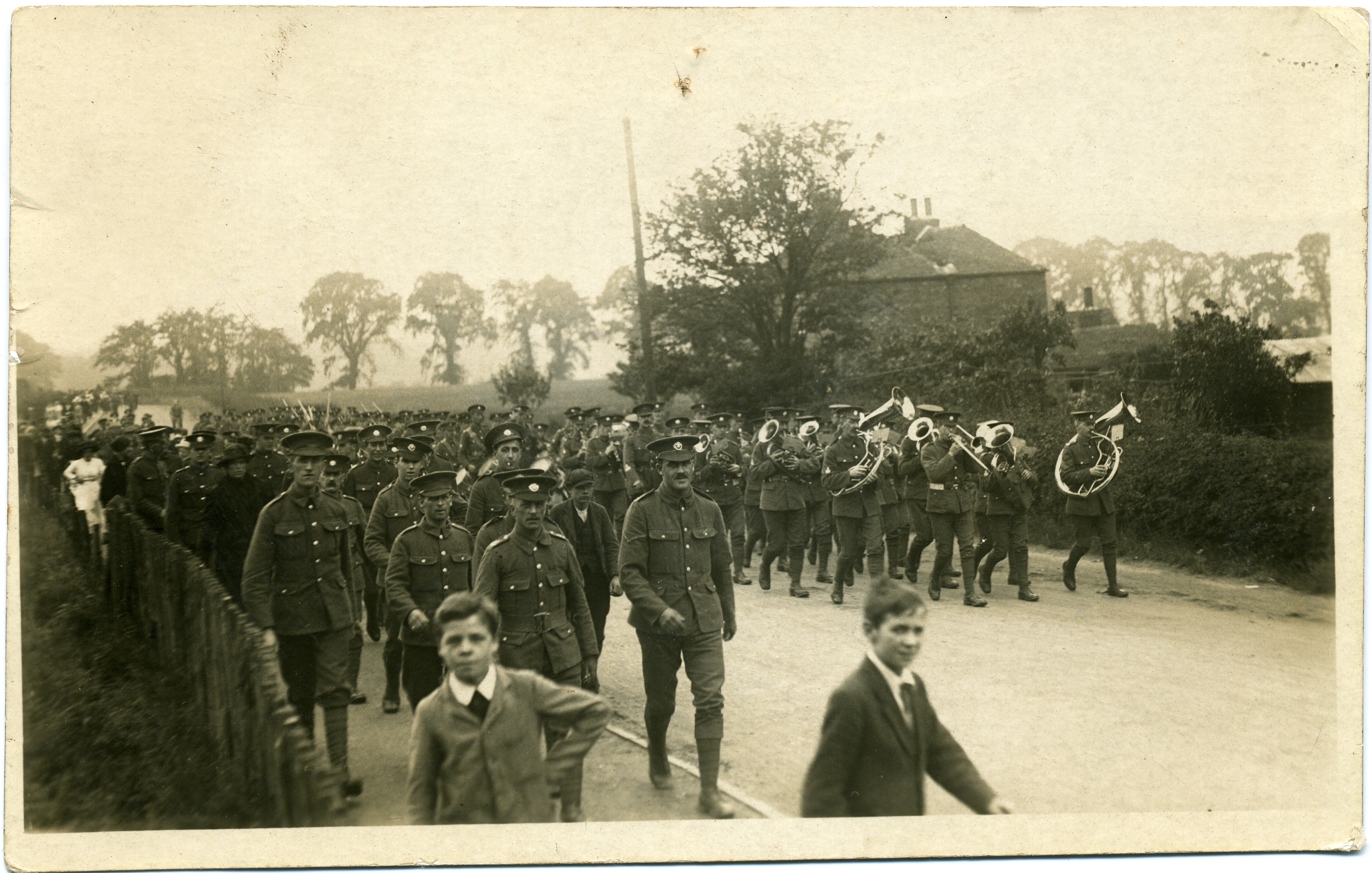
Fred C Palmer marching band World War 1; (East Kent Regiment), which raised nine battalions in World War I. Today the Buffs are amalgamated into the Princess of Wales's Royal Regiment

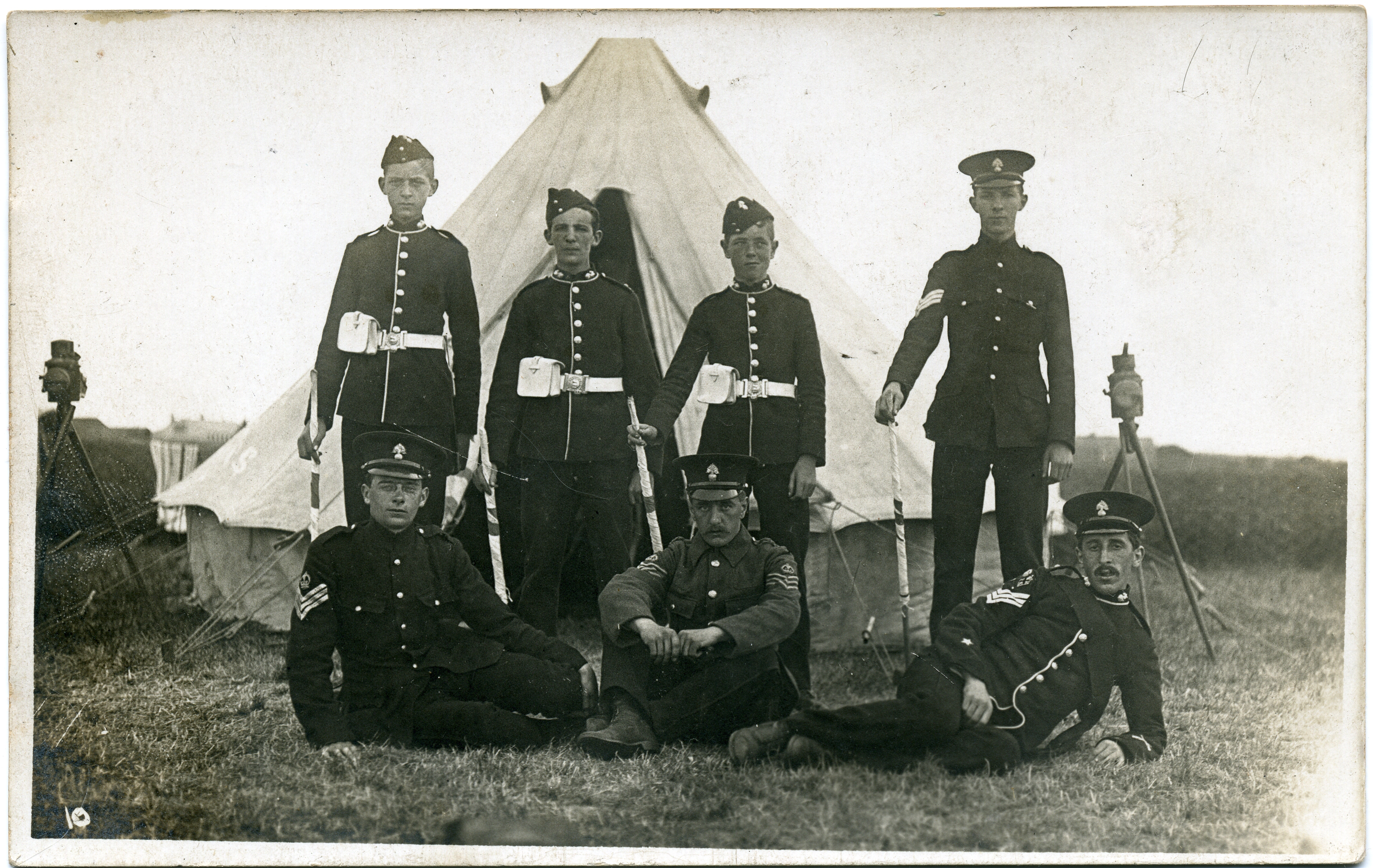
Fred C Palmer Royal Fusiliers portrait World War 1

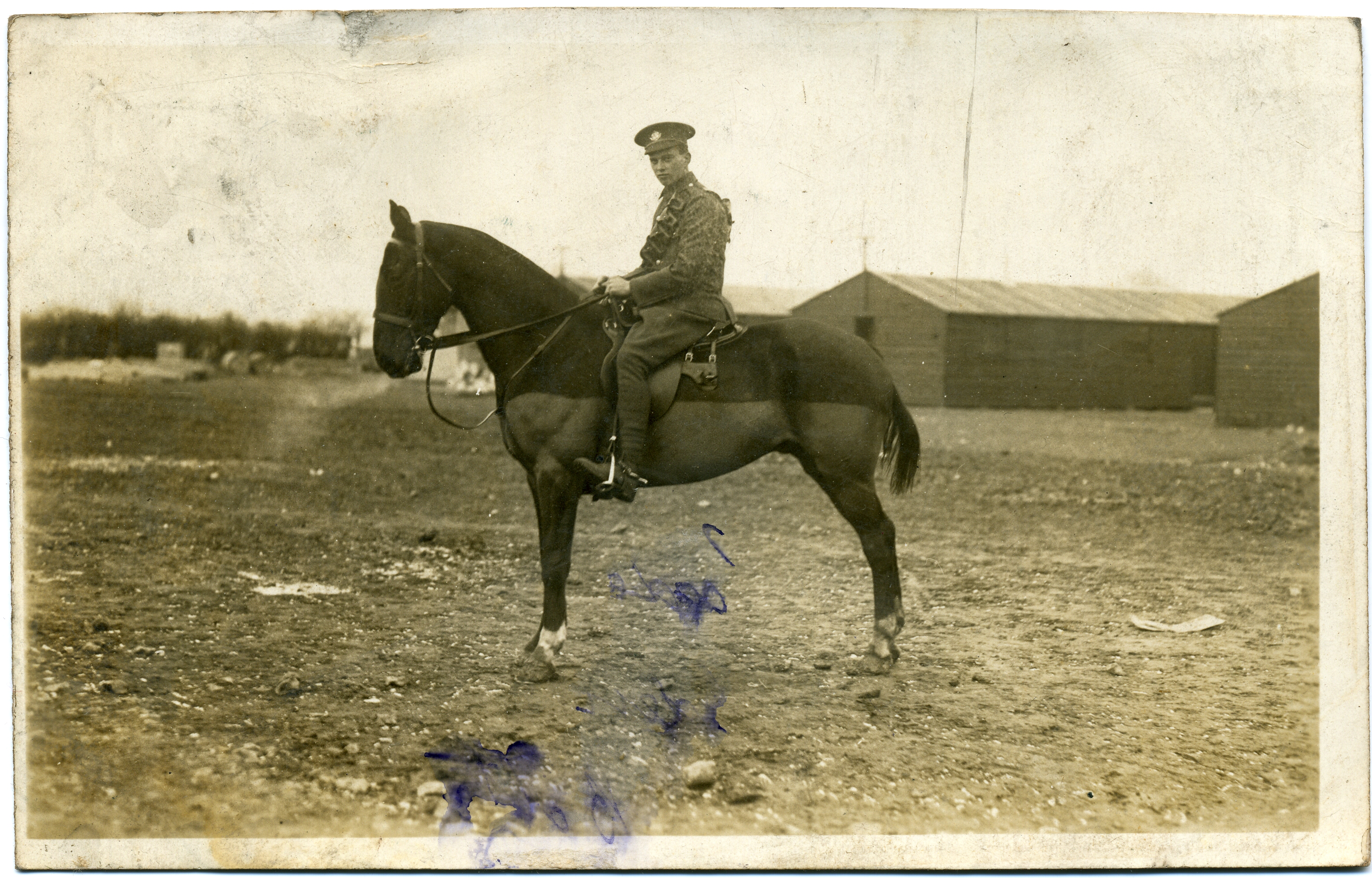
Fred C Palmer equestrian portrait World War 1

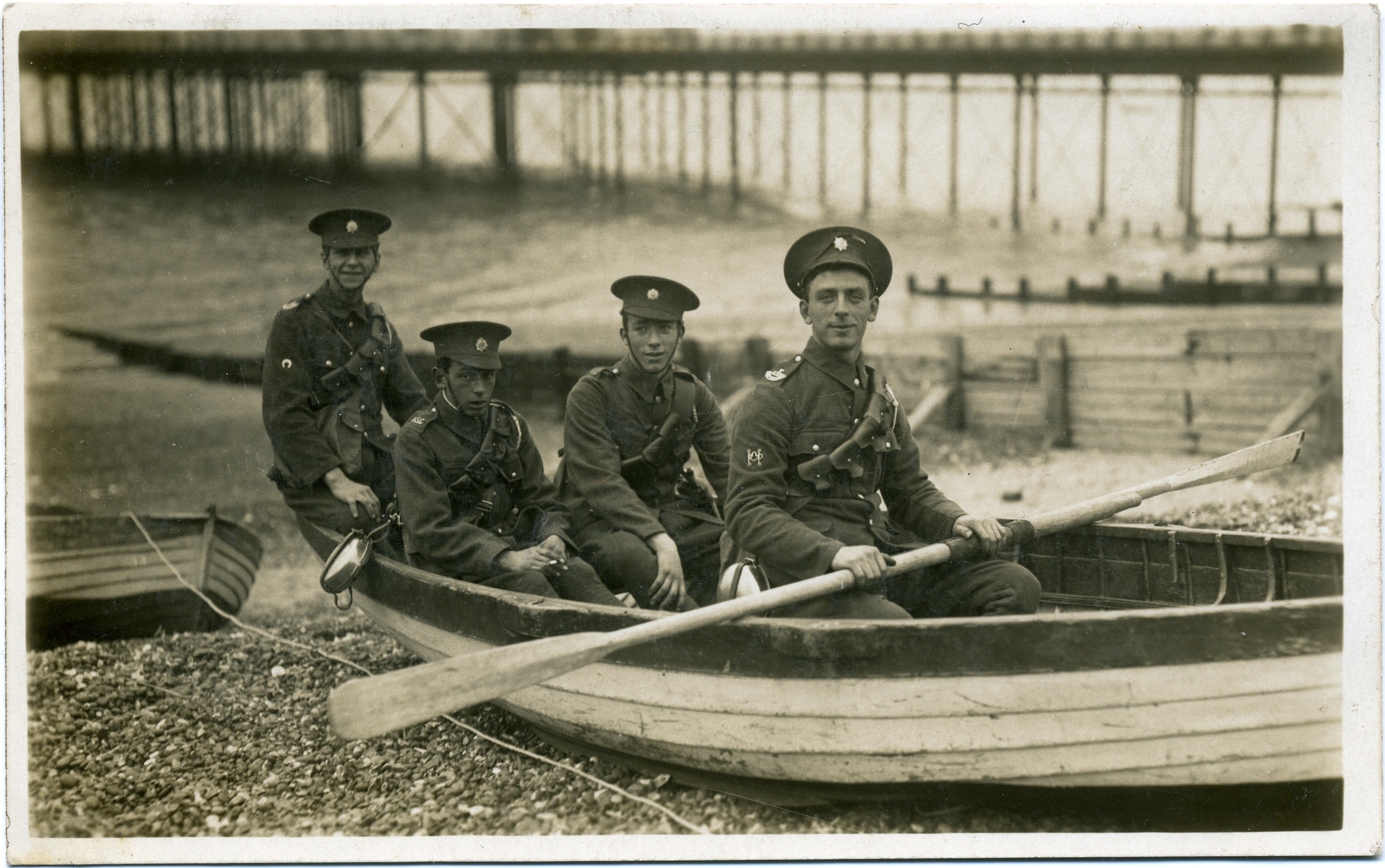
Fred C Palmer World War 1 ASC soldiers

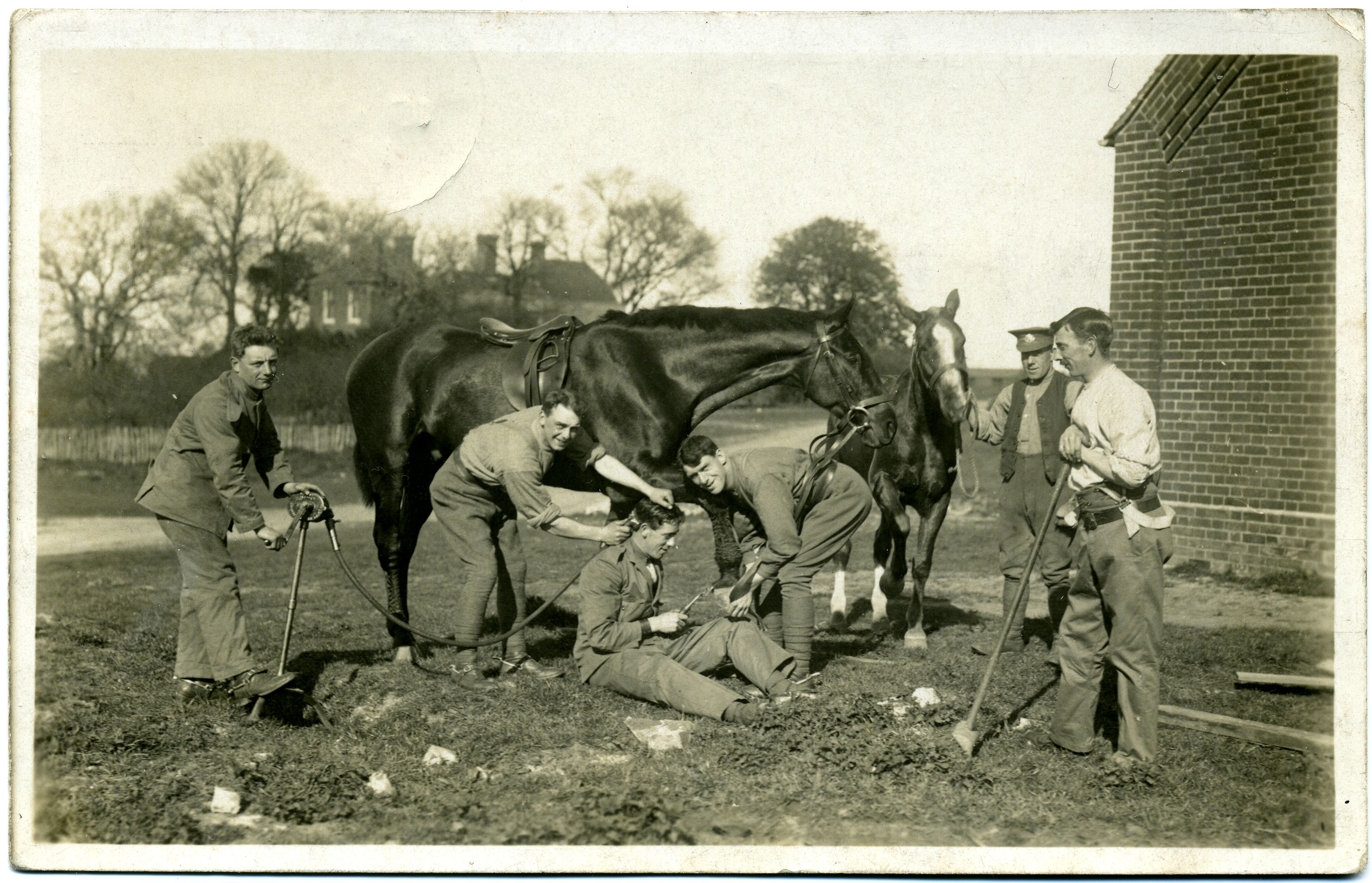
Fred C Palmer World War 1 horses

== Ice hockey team ==
The regiment formerly operated a senior ice hockey team which played in the Ontario Hockey Association, and won the J. Ross Robertson Cup in 1908. Hockey Hall of Fame inductees Captain George Richardson and Scotty Davidson played on the senior team.

== See also ==
- List of armouries in Canada
- Military history of Canada
- History of the Canadian Army
- Canadian Forces
- The Canadian Crown and the Canadian Forces

== Order of precedence ==
Preceded by The Royal Hamilton Light Infantry (Wentworth Regiment)	The Princess of Wales' Own Regiment	Succeeded by The Hastings and Prince Edward Regiment

== Sources ==
- A Rifleman Went To War, by Capt. Herbert W. McBride, MM, Small Arms Technical Publishing Company 1935, ISBN 978-1-62358-028-5
- The Emma Gees, by Capt. Herbert W. McBride, MM, The Bobbs-Merrill Company Publishers, 1918, ISBN
- The Princess of Wales' Own Regiment ( M.G. ) by J. D. And Others Mackenzie - Naughton (1946)
