= Canadian Airways =

Canadian regional air service (1930–1942)

Canadian Airways Limited
- Founded: 1930
- Ceased operations: 1942
- Fleet size: See Aircraft below
- Destinations: See Destinations below
- Headquarters: Sioux Lookout, Ontario and later, Hudson, Ontario
- Key people: James Armstrong Richardson Sr.

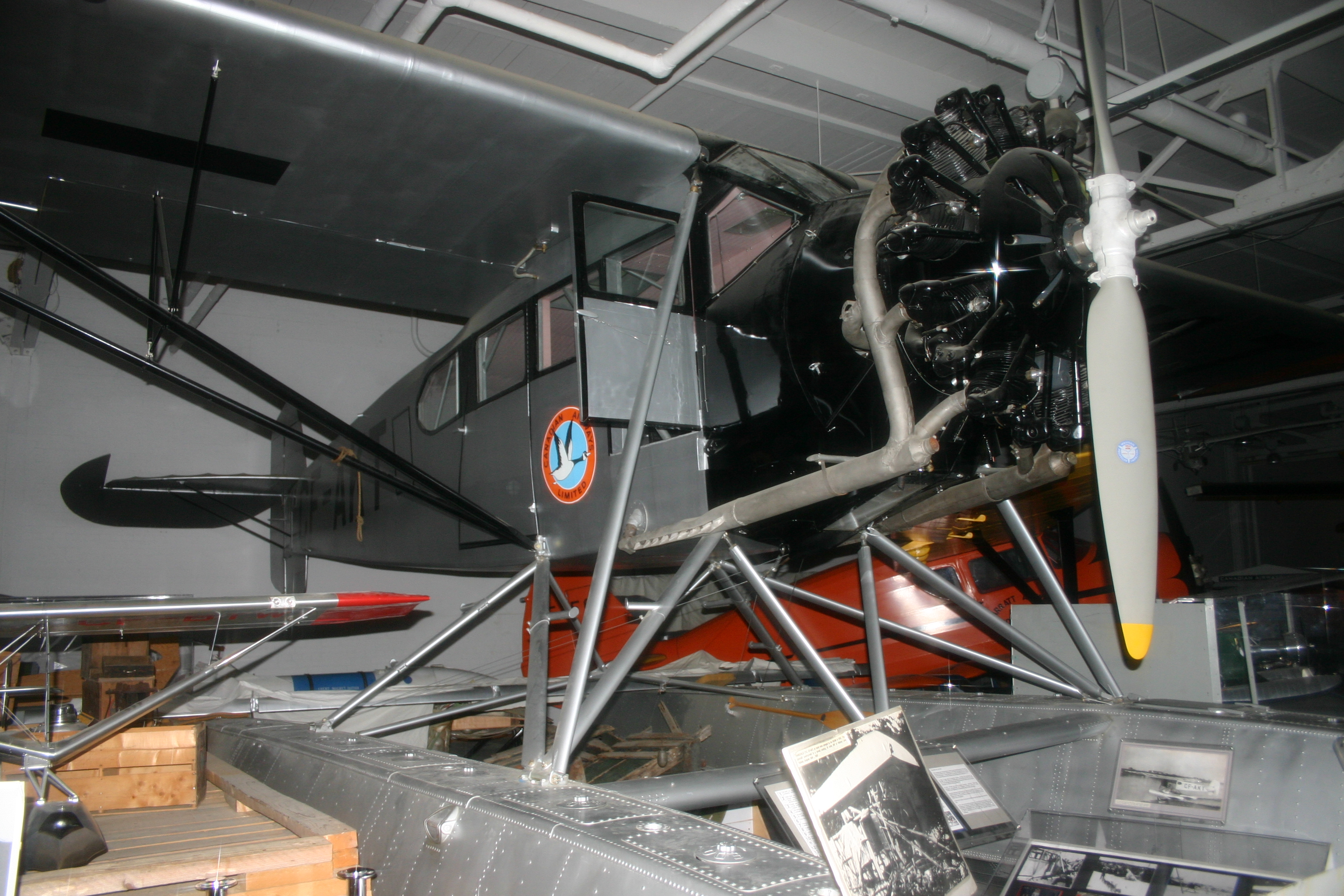
Fairchild 71C (CF-AKT) in Canadian Airways livery at the Western Canada Aviation Museum, Winnipeg, Manitoba

Canadian Airways Limited was a Canadian regional passenger and freight air service based in Winnipeg, Manitoba.

It was founded by James Armstrong Richardson Sr. in 1926 as Western Canada Airways (WCA), was fully established in 1930 following WCA's acquisition of a number of smaller regional competitors. At its peak, Canadian Airways had a total of 51 aircraft of various types that provided both regular scheduled service between settlements as well as charter service to bush locations.

In 1942, Canadian Airways was absorbed into the fledgling Canadian Pacific Airlines, following Richardson's death three years earlier.

== History ==
James Armstrong Richardson Sr. established Western Canada Airways in 1926 which was later to become Canadian Airways Limited.

In 1926, James Armstrong Richardson Sr. founded Western Canada Airways (WCA), which was fully established in 1930 following WCA's acquisition of a number of smaller regional competitors.

Over time, Richardson obtained 51 aircraft and an assortment of top bush pilots and military pilots, all of which provided various services, particularly cargo transport, to northwestern Canada. Richardson was in charge of financial operations, hiring and selecting personnel, and selecting equipment suitable for WCA's specific routes through Canada's winter conditions.This led to many contacts within the aviation industry, and he was known as an effective worker. In 1927, he was made a director of the Canadian Pacific Railway (CPR), something that would inevitably influence later events involving his venture.

By 1929, he had taken WCA to the #2 spot behind Imperial Airways in the British Empire.

In order to expand WCA at the national level, Richardson convened a syndicate, which led to the formation of the Aviation Corporation of Canada in July 1929. The purpose of this formation was to help in the acquisition of eastern Canadian aviation companies to facilitate the planned expansion. This was done with Sir Henry Worth Thornton, representing the Canadian National Railway and Sir Edward Wentworth Beatty, of the CPR.

In 1930, Canadian Airways Limited was established after the acquisition of several aviation companies, including the previously mentioned Aviation Corporation of Canada. Richardson's goal was realized. Richardson became the president and general manager. Richardson's advanced logistical knowledge, business sense, vision and technological innovation, allowed him to piece together a vision for Canadian Air Services heading into the future.

Air mail was the backbone of aviation at the time as it underpinned regular services and helped cover costs. Richardson was particularly worried about Canadian sovereignty. The budding challenges of international competition and eastern and western Canada's strategic interests weighed on his mind as well. Political activities of varying degrees and the great depression in particular began to take a toll through the very early 1930s.

In 1932, the government mail contracts were cancelled and a host of new restrictions were introduced by the federal government. These actions would serve to gradually undermine Canadian Airways.

By 1936, control of civil aviation was transferred from the Department of National Defence to the newly established Department of Transport, operated under Minister Clarence Decatur Howe.

Around this time, Richardson's earlier fears were on the verge of being realized as American aviation companies were beginning to work towards establishing passenger routes within Canada. The Department of Transport was considering developing a national air transport system to help protect Canada's budding airline industry. Howe led Richardson to believe that his Canadian Airways would be the chosen airline for the task. He repeated this intention routinely.

Using Richardson's Canadian Airways business plan and key personnel from the Airline, Howe formed a government-run entity known as Trans-Canada Air Lines (TCA) in 1937 instead.

Richardson was deeply saddened by the betrayal and the way the events had unfolded. The personal assurances of government support for Canadian Airways were not acted upon and Howe's will to see the government rise to prominence in the field left Richardson and others out in the cold. Unfortunately, Richardson's decency and lack of will to protest publicly left Canadian Airways vulnerable.

After this, Richardson's health began to decline. He suffered from spells of sickness and exhaustion which were attributed by his doctors at the time to stress. He died suddenly on June 26, 1939.

At some point in 1939, Canadian Pacific Railway Limited, led by Sir Edward Wentworth Beatty began to implement a plan to purchase ten bush airlines from around Canada to form a new airline. Whether or not this was decided in collaboration with Richardson is not known for certain. This airline would eventually become Canadian Pacific Airlines, which was a subsidiary of CPR once government approval was obtained to amalgamate the ten airlines. The companies were Ginger Coote Airways (Vancouver), Yukon Southern Air Transport (Vancouver/Edmonton), Canadian Airways (Winnipeg), Wings LTD (Winnipeg), Prairie Airways (Moose Jaw), Mackenzie Air Services (Edmonton), Arrow Airways (The Pas), Starratt Airways (Hudson), Quebec Airways (Montreal), Dominion Skyways (Montreal).

Beatty created Canadian Pacific Airlines as a response to the TCA in 1942.

== Aircraft ==
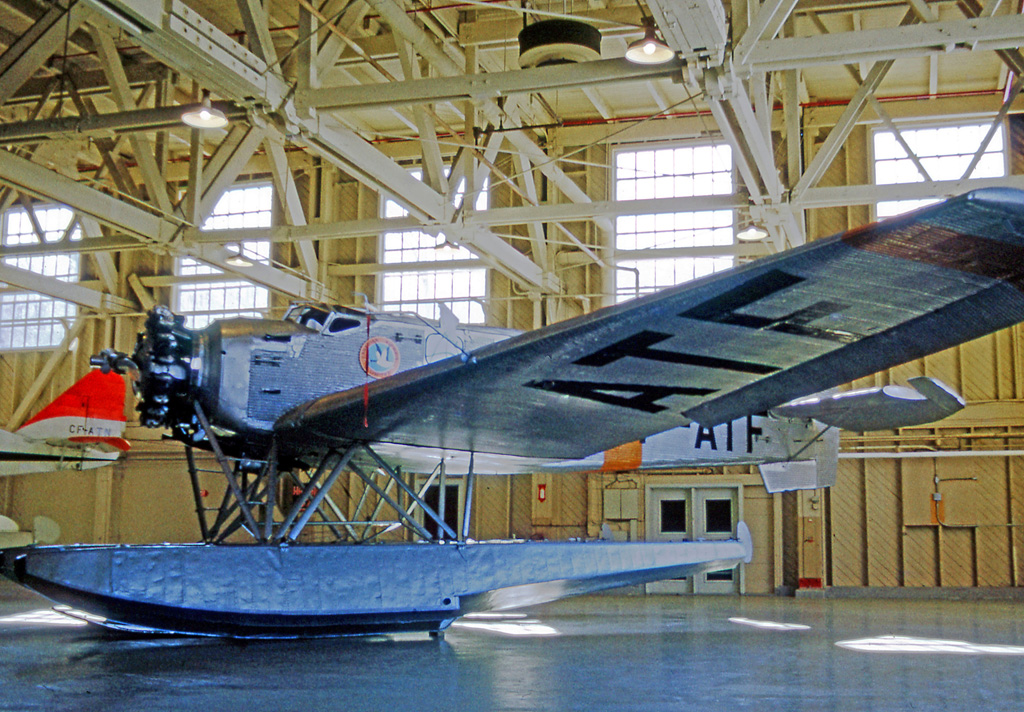
Junkers W.34 preserved in Canadian Airways markings on floats at the Canada Aviation Museum at Rockcliffe near Ottawa

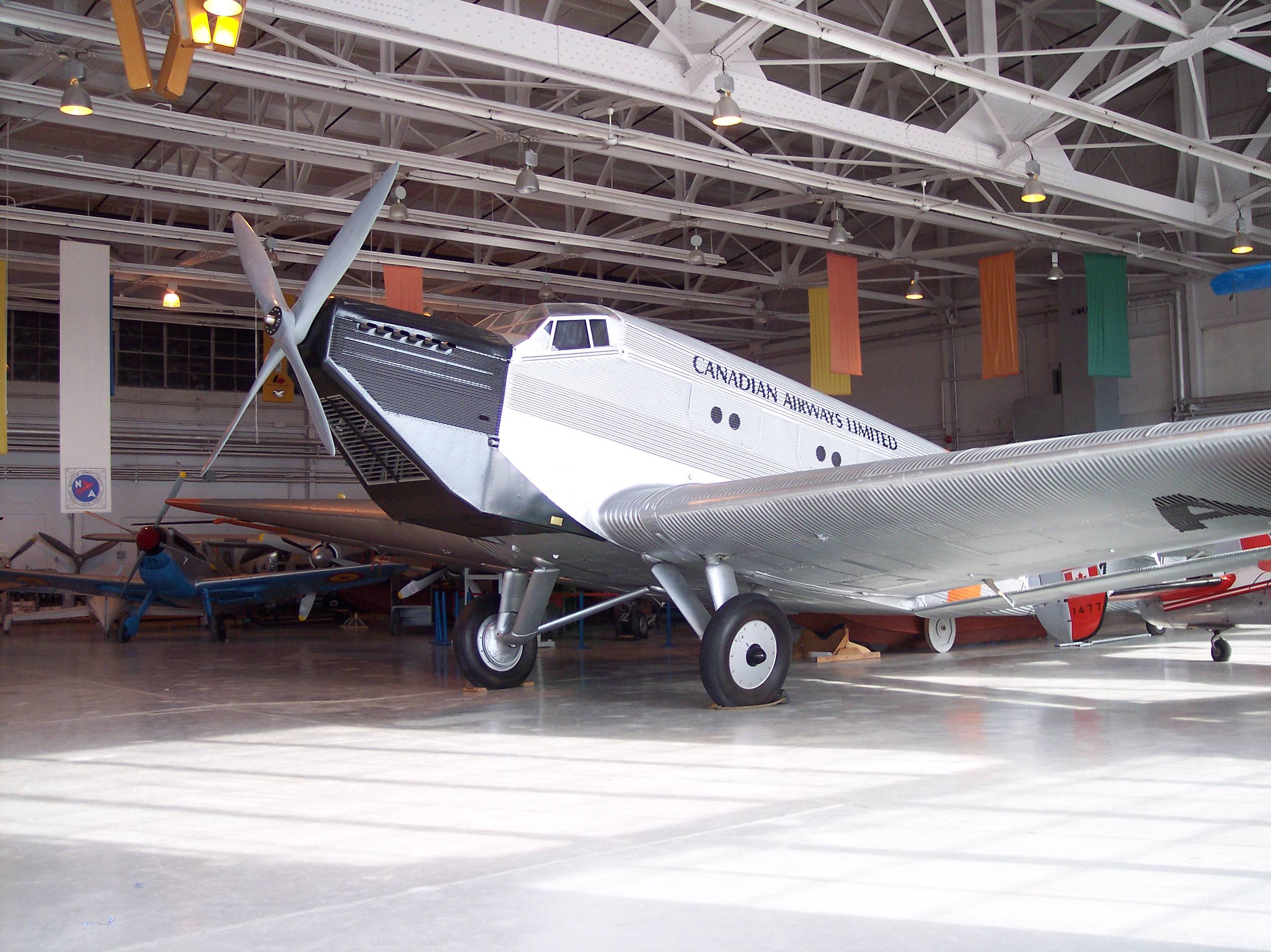
Replica Ju 52/1m CF-ARM at the Western Canada Aviation Museum.

Aircraft operated by Canadian Airways included:

- Boeing 40 (CF-AIN, CF-AIM)
- Consolidated Fleetster (CF-AIP)
- De Havilland Dragon
- Fairchild 71C (CF-ACO, CF-ACT, CF-ATZ),
- Fairchild 82A (CF-AXE)
- Fokker F.VII/3m Tri-Motor (G-CASC)
- Fokker F.14 (CF-AIG, CF-AIK)
- Fokker Super Universal (G-CASM, G-CASN, G-CASK and others)
- Fokker Universal (G-CAFU, G-CAGD, G-CAGE)
- Junkers W 34
- the sixth Ju 52 built, Junkers Ju 52/1m (CF-ARM), a large single-engined monoplane powered by a Rolls-Royce Buzzard received in 1936. Known as the Flying Boxcar, it was the largest aircraft in Canada and operated from wheels, skis and floats.
- Lockheed Vega (CF-AAL)
- Lockheed Model 10 Electra (CF-AZY) Five of the 10A model were acquired
- Pitcairn Mailwing
- four Stearman 4EMs, (CF-AMB, CF-AMC etc.)

== Destinations ==
Destinations served included:

- Carcross, Yukon
- Lac-à-la-Tortue Airport (Quebec),
- Grande Prairie Airport (Grande Prairie, Alberta)
- Peace River, Alberta
- Seattle, Washington
- Vancouver, British Columbia
- Victoria, British Columbia
- Lac du Bonnet, Manitoba
- Sioux Lookout, Ontario
- Kenora, Ontario
- Red Lake, Ontario
- Pickle Lake, Ontario
- Charlottetown, Prince Edward Island
- Montreal, Quebec
- Prince Albert, Saskatchewan
- Edmonton, Alberta
- Toronto, Ontario
- Winnipeg, Manitoba

== See also ==
- List of defunct airlines of Canada
