= James Armstrong Richardson =

Canadian politician and businessman (1922–2004)

The Honourable James Armstrong Richardson PC

Minister of National Defence
- In office November 27, 1972 – October 12, 1976
- Prime Minister: Pierre Trudeau
- Preceded by: Charles Drury (acting)
- Succeeded by: Barney Danson

Minister of Supply and Services
- In office May 5, 1969 – November 26, 1972
- Prime Minister: Pierre Trudeau
- Preceded by: Donald Jamieson
- Succeeded by: Jean-Pierre Goyer

Member of Parliament for Winnipeg South
- In office June 25, 1968 – May 21, 1979
- Preceded by: Bud Sherman
- Succeeded by: District abolished

Personal details
- Born: James Armstrong Richardson Jr. March 28, 1922 Winnipeg, Manitoba, Canada
- Died: May 17, 2004 (aged 82) Winnipeg, Manitoba, Canada
- Party: Liberal (until 1978); Independent (1978–1979)
- Other political affiliations: Reform (1987–2000)
- Spouse: Shirley
- Relations: Agnes Benidickson (sister)
- Parent: James Armstrong Richardson Sr.
- Occupation: Grain Merchant
- Known for: Opposition to bilingualism

Military service
- Branch/service: Royal Canadian Air Force
- Years of service: 1939–1945
- Rank: Pilot officer

James Armstrong Richardson Jr. PC (March 28, 1922 – May 17, 2004) was a Canadian Cabinet minister under Pierre Trudeau and a Winnipeg businessman.

== Early life ==
Richardson was born on March 28, 1922, in Winnipeg, Manitoba to James Armstrong Richardson Sr. and Muriel (née) Sprague. He attended St. John's-Ravenscourt School. He attended Queen's University in Kingston, Ontario, and earned a B.A. in political science and economics.

== World War II ==
After university, he enlisted in the Royal Canadian Air Force. He served as an anti-submarine pilot based in Iceland and Labrador during World War II. He finished his war service with the rank of pilot officer. For his service, he was awarded the following: War Medal 1939–1945, the Canadian Volunteer Service Medal with Overseas Clasp, the 1939–1945 Star, and the Atlantic Star.

== Business pursuits ==
Following the war, Richardson joined the family owned grain company, James Richardson and Sons, and became chief executive officer and chairman in 1966.

== Politics ==
He left the company to enter politics, winning a seat in the House of Commons of Canada in the 1968 election as the Liberal Member of Parliament for Winnipeg South. Richardson defeated future provincial cabinet minister Bud Sherman, his Progressive Conservative opponent.

Richardson was appointed to the cabinet of Prime Minister Pierre Trudeau as a minister without portfolio on July 6, 1968. He also served as acting Minister of Transport for five days in early 1969, and was promoted to Minister of Supply and Services on May 5 of the same year. From November 27, 1972, until October 12, 1976, he was Minister of National Defence.

Richardson was re-elected in the 1972 election. In the 1974 election, he defeated future Premier of Manitoba Sterling Lyon by only 1,266 votes.

=== Resignation from Trudeau cabinet ===
He resigned from Cabinet in 1976 to protest the government's implementation of official bilingualism and its proposed entrenchment in the constitution. In 1978, he left the Liberal caucus entirely and crossed the floor to sit as an Independent MP for the remainder of his term. He unsuccessfully attempted to form a new political party, the One Canada Party, but that floundered and he was not a candidate in the 1979 election. Richardson endorsed Joe Clark's Progressive Conservative Party in the 1980 federal election.

== Post-political life ==
After leaving elected politics, Richardson helped found the Canada West Council and served on a number of corporate boards. He also created James Richardson International, the successor company to James Richardson & Sons.

In 1987, Richardson announced his support for the newly created Reform Party of Canada. He was the brother of Agnes Benidickson, former Chancellor of Queen's University and brother-in-law of former Liberal MP and Cabinet minister William Moore Benidickson.

== See also ==
- List of Canadian politicians who have crossed the floor
