= James Armstrong Richardson Sr. =

Canadian businessman (1885–1939)

James Armstrong Richardson
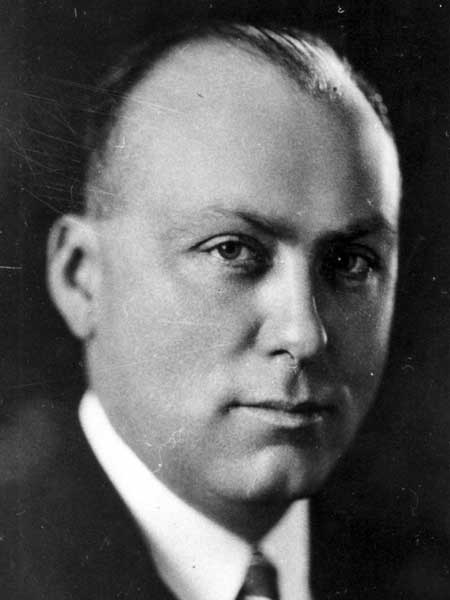

Chancellor of Queen's University
- In office 1929–1939
- Preceded by: Robert Borden
- Succeeded by: Charles Dunning

Personal details
- Born: August 21, 1885 Kingston, Ontario, Canada
- Died: June 26, 1939 (aged 53) Winnipeg, Manitoba, Canada
- Spouse: Muriel Sprague (m. 1919)
- Relations: James Richardson (grandfather)
- Children: James Armstrong Richardson II

James Armstrong Richardson Sr. (August 21, 1885 – June 26, 1939) was an influential business person in Canada in both business and aviation during the early part of the 20th century. He lived most of his life in Winnipeg.

== Early life ==
James Armstrong Richardson was born in Kingston, Ontario, in 1885 to Agnes (McCausland) and George A. Richardson. He attended Queen's and received his Bachelor of Arts in 1906. After graduation, Richardson entered the family business founded by his grandfather, James Richardson & Sons, at the time, one of Canada's greatest grain exporters.

== Business interests ==
Richardson became vice president of the company in 1912 and its president in 1919; in 1923, he moved the main office of the firm from Kingston to Winnipeg. Richardson quickly rose to prominence in the grain business and was elected President of the Winnipeg Grain Exchange. He was recognised as an astute businessman and sat on the Board of Directors of many Canadian companies, including the Canadian Pacific Railway, the Canadian Imperial Bank of Commerce, International Nickel, the National Trust Company Limited, the Great West Life Assurance Company, and Canadian Vickers.

== Contributions to aviation ==
Richardson's greatest contributions came as a pioneer of Canadian commercial aviation; he founded Western Canada Airways in 1926 and helped open up the mineral mining development of the North with his air transport routes. The later company, Canadian Airways was instrumental in creating a transcontinental air system that was eventually incorporated into the fledgling Trans-Canada Air Lines (that became Air Canada). The backroom deals in 1937 that cut Canadian Airways out of the transcontinental routes was said to have "broken his heart". He died two years later.

Richardson was the 6th Chancellor of Queen's University, elected in 1929 and he served in this post until his death from a heart attack in 1939.

== The Richardson legacy ==
His daughter, Agnes Benidickson, would later become the first female chancellor of Queen's, and his son James Armstrong Richardson, would become a Cabinet minister in the government of Pierre Trudeau.

In December 2006, the Winnipeg International Airport was renamed Winnipeg James Armstrong Richardson International Airport in his honour.

The main stadium at Queen's University is named in honour of his brother, Captain George Taylor Richardson, a Queen's alumnus (BSc 1909) and a valiant soldier who was killed in action in World War I.

Today, Richardson & Sons, Limited is a family-owned company that has expanded and developed into an international, multi-enterprise corporation. The firm manages successful operations in agriculture and food processing through Richardson International, financial services through Richardson Financial Group, property management through Lombard Place Limited, oil and gas exploration through Tundra Oil & Gas Limited, and oil and gas marketing through Kingston Midstream Limited. In 2009, Richardson Partners Financial merged with GMP Private Client to form Richardson GMP, a wealth management and investment services firm.

Academic offices
Preceded by Robert Borden	Chancellor of Queen's University; 1929–1939	Succeeded by Charles Avery Dunning
