= Agnes Benidickson =

Agnes McCausland Benidickson
- Born: Agnes McCausland Richardson; August 19, 1920; Chaffeys Locks, Ontario
- Died: March 23, 2007 (aged 86); Ottawa, Ontario
- Spouse: William Moore Benidickson
- Father: James A. Richardson Sr.
- Relatives: James A. Richardson Jr. (brother)
- Awards: Order of Canada; Order of Ontario

Agnes McCausland Benidickson CC OOnt (née Richardson; August 19, 1920 – March 23, 2007) was the first female chancellor of Queen's University at Kingston, Ontario, Canada, from 1980 to 1996.

Queen's highest honour for student service to the University, is named in her honour. Recipients of the Agnes Benidickson Tricolour Award are awarded admission into the Agnes Benidickson Tricolour Society.

== Personal life ==
Born in Chaffeys Locks, Ontario, Agnes McCausland Richardson was the daughter of the former Queen's Chancellor James Armstrong Richardson Sr., who served from 1929 to 1939. She was named after her aunt Agnes McCausland Richardson Etherington (1880–1954). She was raised in Winnipeg, and received her B.A. degree from Queen's in 1941, and an LL.D. degree in 1979.

She is the sister of the Honourable James A. Richardson Jr., who was a Trudeau-era Liberal member of the Canadian Parliament and cabinet minister.

In 1947, she married William Moore Benidickson (1911–1985), who was a Liberal MP and later became a Cabinet minister and Senator. She was made an Officer of the Order of Canada in 1987, and promoted to a Companion in 1998. In 1987, she received an honorary Doctors of Law degree from the University of British Columbia. In 1991, she was awarded the Order of Ontario.

She died on March 23, 2007, at her home in Ottawa. From her obituary:

Agnes lived a life enriched by her family, her travels, her experiences and above all by her service to community and country through a host of organizations which she founded, helped to lead and sustain through her tireless volunteer efforts. Her life and her example will continue to be celebrated by her children, Jamie, Kris and Kathleen, their partners Melanie Mallet, Shirley Benidickson, and Alex Ramsay, daughter-in-law Victoria Young-Benidickson, granddaughters Nicola Benidickson, Kirsten Benidickson, Martha and Leigh Ramsay, her extended family, and all who were touched by the commitment, insight, grace and generosity which were the hallmarks of her life.

Academic offices
Preceded by Roland Michener	Chancellor of Queen's University; 1980–1996	Succeeded by Peter Lougheed
