= Richardson Stadium (Kingston) =

Football stadium in Kingston, Ontario

Coordinates: 44.227583°N 76.515794°W

- Richardson Stadium
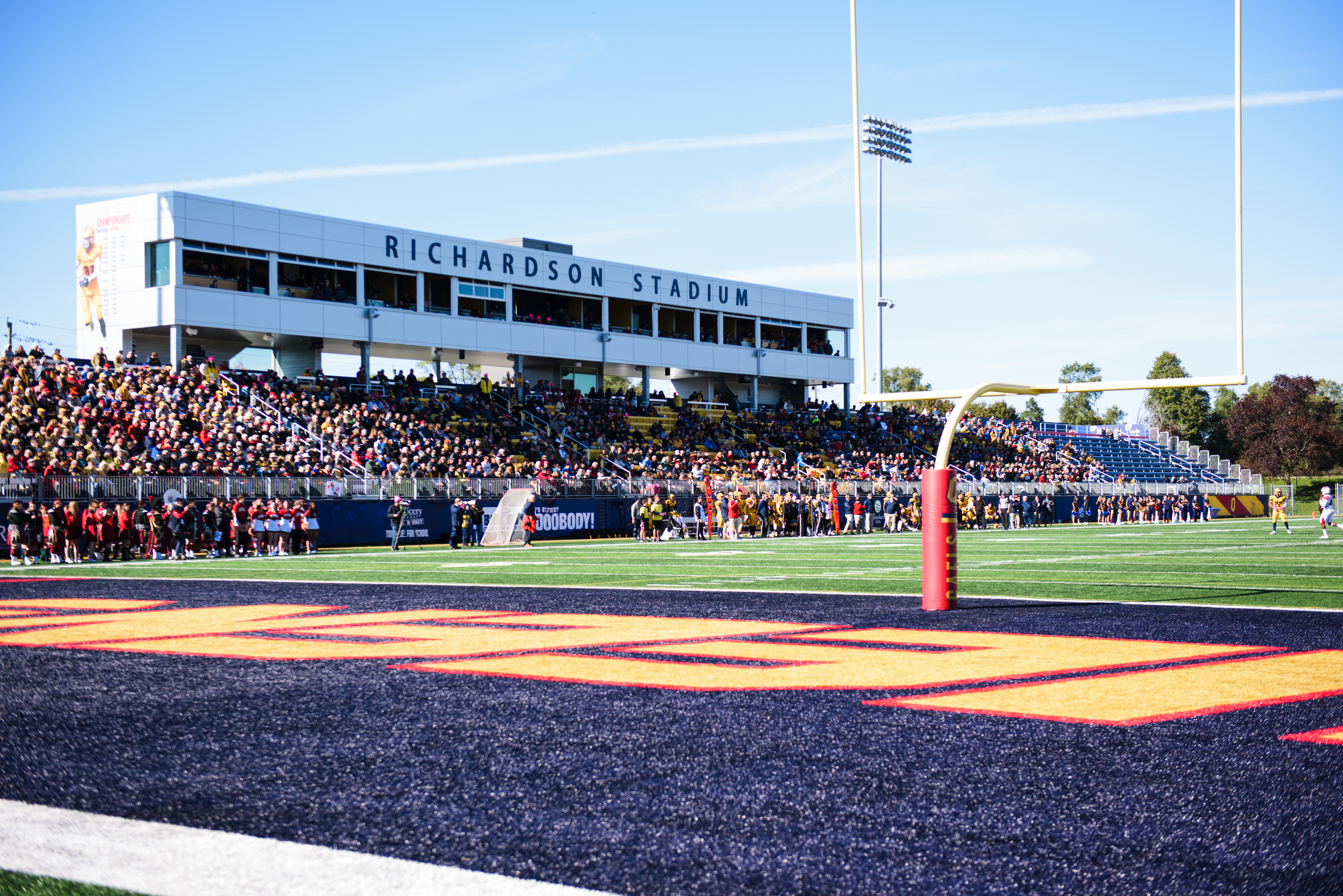
- The current stadium grandstands from endzone perspective.
- Interactive map of Richardson Stadium
- Full name: George Taylor Richardson Memorial Stadium
- Location: Queen's West Campus, Kingston, Ontario
- Owner: Queen's University
- Capacity: 8,000+ (2016–); 8,600 (2013–2015); 10,200 (1971–2012); 4,700 (1921–1971)
- Surface: FieldTurf; Grass (1921–2015)

Construction
- Opened: October 18, 1921
- Rebuilt: Fall 1971 (2nd stadium); September 17, 2016 (3rd stadium)

Tenants
- Queen's Gaels (Ontario University Athletics & U Sports football) (1921-present)

Richardson Stadium, officially named George Taylor Richardson Memorial Stadium, is the football stadium for Queen's University, in Kingston, Ontario. The stadium is primarily used for Canadian football but also has hosted other sporting events such as soccer and rugby.

There has been a stadium at Queen's University since 1921, all using the same name. A second stadium was built in 1971 to replace the first. This was replaced in 2016 when the third and most current version was opened. The current stadium has a seating capacity of over 8,000.

The facilities are named in memory of George Taylor Richardson, a Queen's graduate renowned for his athleticism and sportsmanship who died in the First World War.

== History ==
=== First stadium (1921–1971) ===
The original field and stadium was located on Union Street at the present site of Mackintosh-Corry Hall and its parking lot. It was opened in 1921 on a piece of land bought from a community of nuns. This field hosted the 1922 Grey Cup, where the Golden Gaels defeated the Edmonton Elks 13–1, for their first of three Grey Cups. The official attendance was listed at 4,700. According to Michael Januska's book, Grey Cup Century there were more spectators on hand than the original grandstand could accommodate.

"The 10th Grey Cup was the only final played in Kingston, Ontario. The stands at Richardson Stadium were filled to capacity, just under 5,000, with the overflow standing around the field."

Franklin Delano Roosevelt received his honorary degree from Queen's on August 18, 1938, at Richardson, where he made a historic speech that was seen as a departure from American isolationism.

The original stadium built in 1921 was funded by James Armstrong Richardson, graduate and Chancellor of Queen's. James was the brother of the George Taylor Richardson.

=== Second stadium (1971–2016) ===
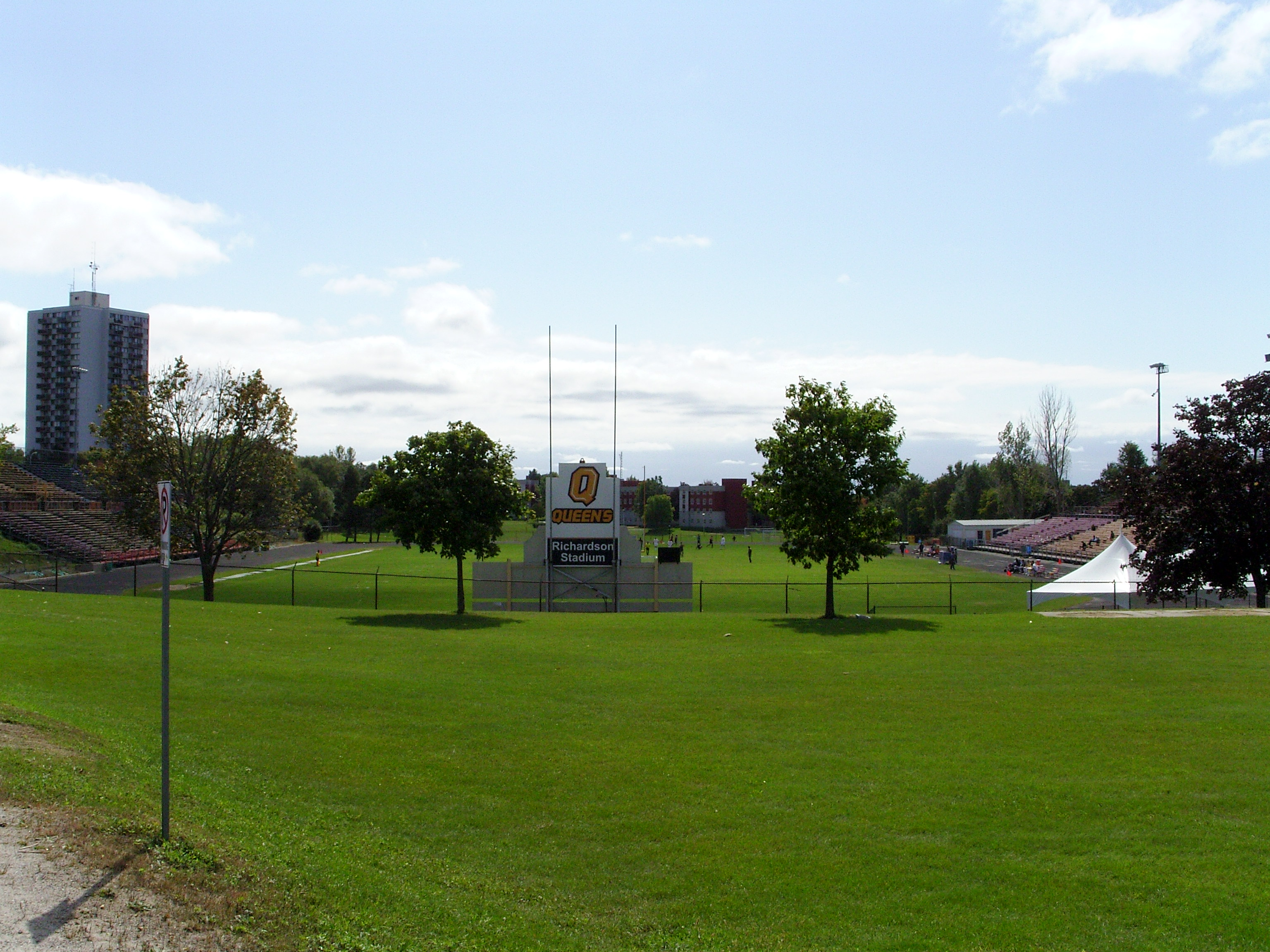
A view from outside the second stadium.

When a new social sciences complex, Mackintosh-Corry Hall was planned, the original stadium was torn down and relocated to the newly acquired West Campus. Many staff, students, and alumni were very upset about the move, feeling that the stadium belonged in the heart of campus, but the project continued and the stadium was built on West Campus in 1971.

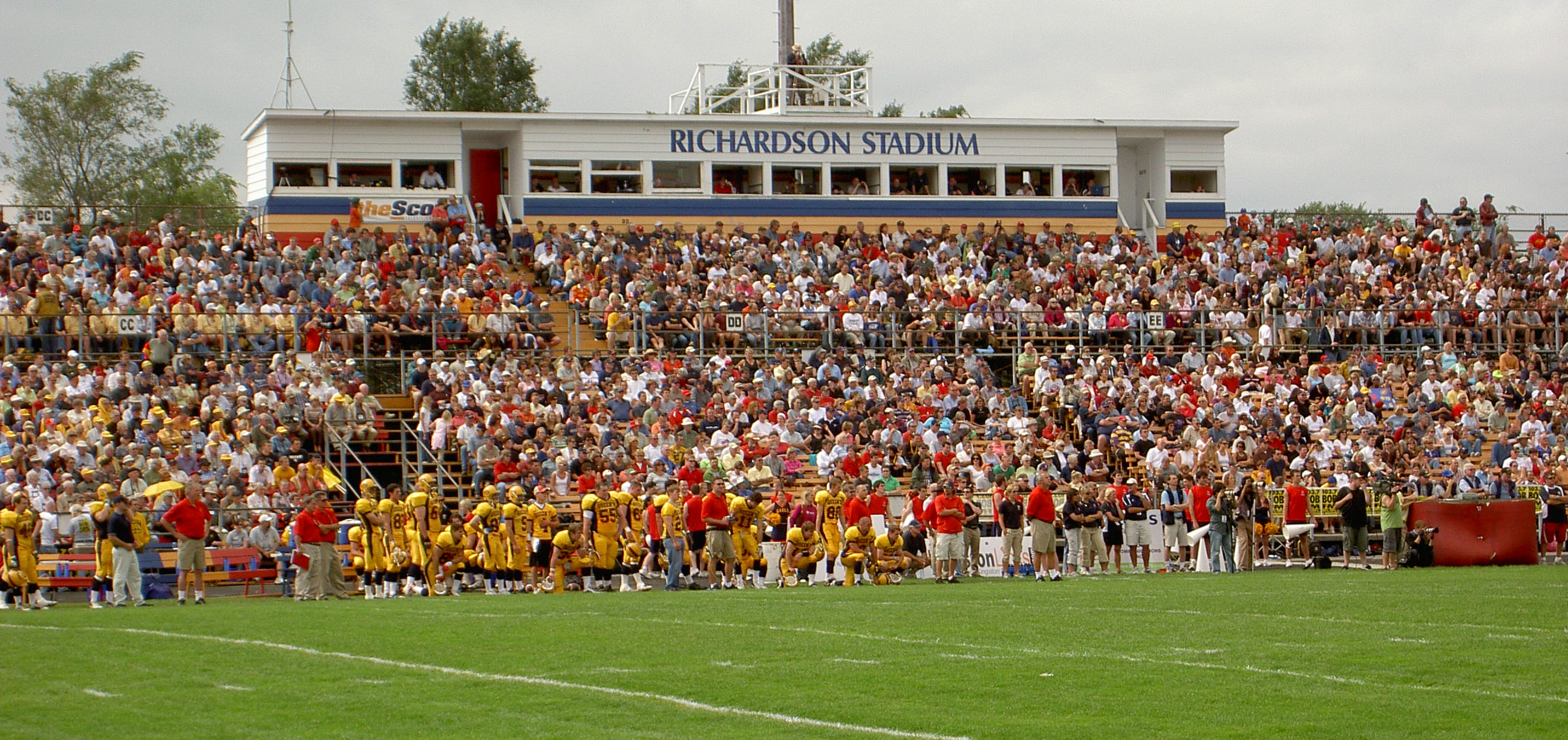
The alumni stand of Richardson Stadium in 2006

The stadium's bleachers (which recycled steel from the first facility) were deemed structurally unsafe in May 2013, causing 6,500 seats to be removed. Renovations were completed in July 2013, with a new seat capacity of 8,500 with two new end zone seating sections, reducing the original capacity down from 10,200.

=== Third stadium (2016–present) ===
Plans to reconstruct the 40-year-old stadium at the same location were approved in December 2014, with $20.27 million of funding needed. Principal Daniel Woolf stated that the stadium was "desperately in need of revitalization". $17 million was raised from donations, including $10 million from former Gaels football player and former Guelph Gryphons head coach Stu Lang.

Construction began on December 5, 2015, and the stadium re-opened for the beginning of the 2016 football season on September 17, 2016. According to the university, the facility has 8,000 seats, plus standing room capacity of 2,000.

In September 2023, an additional pavilion was opened. Known as the Lang Pavilion, it provides amenities for student-athletes, coaches, spectators and community members. This includes modern training and competition spaces as well as athletic therapy, hydrotherapy facilities, meeting rooms, and other sport-related amenities.

== Notable events ==
=== Soccer ===
Richardson played host to two World Cup 2006 qualifiers between Canada and Belize in 2004. Canada won both matches 4–0 and progressed to the semifinal stage after Belize had forfeited their right to play a home match due to a lack of infrastructure. Richardson Stadium also hosts the Soccer Games for the Men's and Women's teams of the Queens Gaels University Soccer Team. From November 9 - 12 2023 Richardson Stadium hosted the 2023 U Sports Women's Soccer Championship.

=== Rugby league ===
It hosted the Colonial Cup match between the U.S. Tomahawks and Canada Wolverines on September 19, 2010, which was the first international rugby league match played in Canada since 1995.

=== Rugby union ===
On June 9, 2012, Canada played the United States in a friendly match. Canada won 28–25 in front of 7,521 spectators.
