= Richardson International =

Canadian agricultural company

Richardson International Limited
- Type: Privately Held
- Industry: Agriculture, Food Production
- Founded: 1857
- Headquarters: Richardson Building, Winnipeg, Canada
- Key people: Darwin Sobkow, President & CEO
- Products: Grains, Oilseeds, Food Production, Processing, Canola, Oats
- Number of employees: 2,500
- Parent: James Richardson & Sons
- Website: Richardson International

Richardson International Limited is a privately held Canadian agricultural and food industry company headquartered in Winnipeg, Manitoba. The company is one of several companies that are owned by James Richardson & Sons Limited. The company is a worldwide handler and merchandiser of all major Canadian-grown grains and oilseeds and a vertically integrated processor and manufacturer of oats and canola-based products. Richardson has over 2,500 employees across Canada, the U.S. and U.K. Richardson International is a subsidiary of James Richardson & Sons, Limited, established in 1857.

== Divisions ==
Richardson International is a vertically integrated company, with facilities across Canada and the United States. Headquartered in Winnipeg, Richardson has 3 divisions. In Western Canada, Richardson operates grain handling and crop input facilities under the name of Richardson Pioneer Ag Business Centres. Richardson operates a number of port facilities located strategically in Eastern and Western Canada.

Richardson Oilseed processes canola for oils, sprays and margarine for industrial and home cooking. Richardson was the first company to market canola oil and markets canola products, including under the Canola Harvest brand.

Richardson Milling processes oats in Canada, USA, and Europe.

== History ==
=== Pioneer Grain / Richardson Pioneer ===
In 1913, Pioneer Grain Company Ltd. and Eastern Terminals Ltd. were formed. By then the company had twenty-six licensed elevators, sixteen of which were in Saskatchewan.

In 1921, Pioneer had expanded to over 100 country elevators.

In 1931, forty-four elevators of the Saskatchewan and Western Elevator companies were amalgamated into Pioneer; these elevators had been operated by the Richardsons since the mid-1920s.

In 1947, Pioneer acquired twenty-three elevators from the failed Reliance Grain Company.

In 1952, Pioneer purchased 146 elevators when the Western Grain Elevator Company was sold; Federal Grain also took some of Western's elevators.

In 1953, Pioneer acquired another twenty-two elevators of the Independent line.

In 1972, when Federal was sold in 1972, Pioneer became the largest private grain company.

In 1979, a 112,000-tonne Pioneer Grain port terminal was officially opened in Vancouver. It was capable of loading ships at 140,000-bushels per hour.

In the 1990s, Richardson Pioneer built numerous concrete grain terminals across the prairies. These modern facilities were much larger and more efficient than the old wooden elevators. Most wooden elevators were closed and have since been torn down. In 1994 the first terminal was constructed at Glossop, Manitoba. Terminals were also constructed at Lamont, Carseland, Swift Current, North Battleford, Lloydminster, Saskatoon, Melfort, Tisdale, Southey, Balgonie, Weyburn, Whitewood, Foam Lake, Brunkild, Brandon.

In 2005, a large growth and acquisition process began in 2005 with the purchase of 4 terminals from ConAgra Foods and 4 adjoining crop input centres were purchased from United Agri Products in 2006.

In 2007, James Richardson International was involved in a bidding war with Saskatchewan Wheat Pool over the purchase of Agricore United in 2007. Although unsuccessful, through the deal Richardson acquired grain elevators in Manitoba, Saskatchewan, and Alberta, and was paid a $35 million termination fee from Agricore.

In a 2008, Rebranding, James Richardson International was rebranded as Richardson International and Pioneer Grain became Richardson Pioneer.

From 2010 to 2012, Richardson Pioneer continued to expand the Western Canadian footprint with the purchase of 5 crop input centres and 1 grain terminal in Alberta plus 3 crop input centres and 1 grain terminal in Saskatchewan. The Saskatchewan purchases were all part Northeast Terminals a local farmer owned facility.

In March 2012, Richardson International along with Glencore and Agrium announced they were purchasing Viterra in a 3-way split of that company. Richardson would acquire 19 grain elevators, the oat and wheat milling business in Canada and the US, a terminal in Thunder Bay and a share of Cascadia terminal in Vancouver. This deal closed May 1, 2013.

In 2013, Richardson Pioneer celebrated their 100th year with celebrations across Western Canada.

From 2013 to 2016, the company constructed new terminals were constructed in Estevan, Dauphin along with a large addition to the Vancouver export facility.

In 2017, the company acquired Crop First Agro in Grenfell, SK, as well as European Oat Millers in Bedford, England; becoming Richardson Milling UK. Richardson International's first mill outside of North America.

=== Richardson Oilseeds and Richardson Milling ===
In 1999, Canbra Foods in Lethbridge was acquired. Canola crushing as well as packaging oils and margarine happen here. The Canola Harvest brand is Richardson's retail brand of products.

In 2008, Canbra Foods was rebranded. The canola crushing operations became known as Richardson Oilseeds and the food manufacturing business became known as Richardson Nutrition.

Richardson Oilseeds opened a new canola crushing plant in Yorkton, Saskatchewan in July 2010. At the time of opening this plant was designed for 2,300 mt per day. In 2014, an expansion will be completed for 3,000 mt per day to be processed.

In 2011, Richardson Nutrition purchased Innovative Foods in Mississauga, Ont and Sussex, New Brunswick to further expand its canola oil packaged goods business. An $15 million expansion of the packaging plant in Lethbridge was started this same year.

On May 1, 2013, a new division was formed as part of the Viterra transaction — Richardson Milling.

In June 2015, Richardson purchased Golden Gate Margarine — a retail packaging business based on Oakville, Ontario adding to the Richardson Nutrition locations.
