= Alan Wilson =

Alan, Allan, or Allen Wilson may refer to:

== Sports ==
- Alan Wilson (cricketer, born 1920) (1920–2015), English cricketer
- Alan Wilson (cricketer, born 1936), English cricketer
- Alan Wilson (Australian rules footballer) (born 1939), Australian rules footballer for Fitzroy
- Allan Wilson (Australian footballer) (1916–1984), Australian rules footballer for North Melbourne
- Allan Wilson (footballer, born 1945), Scottish professional footballer
- Alan Wilson (cricketer, born 1942), English cricketer
- Alan Wilson (motorsport) (born 1946), American race track designer
- Alan Wilson (rugby league) (born 1967), Australian rugby league player
- Allen Wilson (American football) (born 1951/2), American high school football coach
- Allan Wilson (ice hockey) (1894–1940), Canadian ice hockey player
- Allan J. Wilson (1886–1963), Canadian-born American horse racing executive

== Politicians ==
- Alan Wilson (politician) (born 1973), attorney general of South Carolina
- Allan Wilson (politician) (born 1954), Labour member of the Scottish Parliament

== Musicians ==
- Alan Wilson (musician) (1943–1970), also known as Alan "Blind Owl" Wilson, American blues singer, lead singer of the group Canned Heat
- Alan Wilson (composer) (born 1947), British composer of church music
- Allan Wilson, musician with American band !!!

== Academics ==
- Alan Herries Wilson (1906–1995), British mathematician and business executive
- Sir Alan Wilson (academic) (born 1939), British scientist and social scientist, UCL
- Allan Wilson (biologist) (1934–1991), New Zealand evolutionary biologist and molecular anthropologist
- Allen B. Wilson (1824–1888), American inventor of the sewing machine shuttle

== Others ==
- Alan Doric Wilson (1939–2011), American playwright, director and producer
- Alan Wilson (bishop) (1955–2024), bishop of Buckingham
- Allan Wilson (army officer) (1856–1893), British major in the First Matabele War, leader of the Shangani Patrol, and the principal character in the London play: Wilson's Last Stand
- Alan R. Wilson, Canadian novelist and poet
- Alan Wilson (judge) (born 1950), justice of the Supreme Court of Queensland
- Alan Wilson (Irish criminal)

== See also ==
- Al Wilson (disambiguation)
- Mark Alan Wilson (1953–2005), American murder victim
- Wilson's Allen (1914–1939), American horse
- Alan N. Willson Jr. (born 1939), American electrical engineer
