= 1981 in baseball =

The following are the baseball events of the year 1981 throughout the world.

== Champions ==
=== Major League Baseball ===
- World Series: Los Angeles Dodgers over New York Yankees (4–2); Ron Cey, Pedro Guerrero, and Steve Yeager, co-MVPs

Division Series
E1	New York Yankees	3
E2	Milwaukee Brewers	2
W1	Oakland Athletics	3
W2	Kansas City Royals	0
E1	Philadelphia Phillies	2
E2	Montreal Expos	3
W1	Los Angeles Dodgers	3
W2	Houston Astros	2

League Championship Series
E	New York Yankees	3
W	Oakland Athletics	0
E	Montreal Expos	2
W	Los Angeles Dodgers	3

World Series
AL	New York Yankees	2
NL	Los Angeles Dodgers	4

NOTE: Due to a strike in mid-season, the season was divided into a first half and a second half. The division winner of the first half (denoted East 1, West 1) played the division winner of the second half (denoted East 2, West 2).

- American League Championship Series MVP: Graig Nettles
- National League Championship Series MVP: Burt Hooton
- All-Star Game, August 9 at Cleveland Stadium: National League, 5–4; Gary Carter, MVP

=== Other champions ===
- Minor League Baseball
  - AAA
    - American Association: Denver Bears (Montreal Expos)
    - International League: Columbus Clippers (New York Yankees)
    - Pacific Coast League: Albuquerque Dukes (Los Angeles Dodgers)
    - Mexican League: Diablos Rojos del México
  - AA
    - Eastern League: Bristol Red Sox (Boston Red Sox)
    - Southern League: Orlando Twins (Minnesota Twins)
    - Texas League: Jackson Mets (New York Mets)
  - A
    - California League: Lodi Dodgers (Los Angeles Dodgers)
    - Carolina League: Hagerstown Suns (Baltimore Orioles)
    - Florida State League: Daytona Beach Astros (Houston Astros)
    - Midwest League: Wausau Timbers (Seattle Mariners)
    - South Atlantic League: Greensboro Hornets (New York Yankees)
    - New York–Penn League: Oneonta Yankees (New York Yankees)
    - Northwest League: Medford Athletics (Oakland Athletics)
  - Rookie
    - Appalachian League: Paintsville Yankees (New York Yankees)
    - Gulf Coast League: Royals Gold (Kansas City Royals)
    - Pioneer League: Butte Copper Kings (Milwaukee Brewers)

International

- Cuban National Series: Vegueros de Pinar del Río
- Japan Series: Yomiuri Giants over Nippon-Ham Fighters (4–2)

Winter Leagues

- 1981 Caribbean Series: Leones del Escogido
- Dominican Republic League: Leones del Escogido
- Mexican Pacific League: Yaquis de Obregón
- Puerto Rican League: Criollos de Caguas
- Venezuelan League: Leones del Caracas

College

- College World Series: Arizona State

Youth

- Big League World Series: Taipei, Taiwan
- Junior League World Series: Boardman, Ohio
- Little League World Series: Tai-Ping, Taichung, Taiwan
- Senior League World Series: Georgetown, Delaware

== Awards and honors ==
- Baseball Hall of Fame
  - Bob Gibson
  - Johnny Mize
  - Rube Foster (executive)

Baseball Writers' Association of America Awards
BBWAA Award	National League	American League
Rookie of the Year	Fernando Valenzuela (LAD)	Dave Righetti (NYY)
Cy Young Award	Fernando Valenzuela (LAD)	Rollie Fingers (MIL)
Most Valuable Player	Mike Schmidt (PHI)	Rollie Fingers (MIL)
Babe Ruth Award (World Series MVP)	Ron Cey (LAD)	—
Gold Glove Awards
Position	National League	American League
Pitcher	Steve Carlton (PHI)	Mike Norris (OAK)
Catcher	Gary Carter (MON)	Jim Sundberg (TEX)
First Baseman	Keith Hernandez (STL)	Mike Squires (CWS)
Second Baseman	Manny Trillo (PHI)	Frank White (KC)
Third Baseman	Mike Schmidt (PHI)	Buddy Bell (TEX)
Shortstop	Ozzie Smith (SD)	Alan Trammell (DET)
Outfielders	Dusty Baker (LAD)	Dwight Evans (BOS)
Outfielders	Andre Dawson (MON)	Rickey Henderson (OAK)
Outfielders	Garry Maddox (PHI)	Dwayne Murphy (OAK)

== Statistical leaders ==
	American League		National League	
Stat	Player	Total	Player	Total
AVG	Carney Lansford (BOS)	.336	Bill Madlock (PIT)	.341
HR	Tony Armas (OAK); Dwight Evans (BOS); Bobby Grich (CAL); Eddie Murray (BAL)	22	Mike Schmidt (PHI)	31
RBI	Eddie Murray (BAL)	78	Mike Schmidt (PHI)	91
W	Dennis Martínez (BAL); Steve McCatty (OAK); Jack Morris (DET); Pete Vuckovich (MIL)	14	Tom Seaver (CIN)	14
ERA	Sammy Stewart (BAL)	2.32	Nolan Ryan (HOU)	1.69
K	Len Barker (CLE)	127	Fernando Valenzuela (LAD)	180

== Major league baseball final standings ==
=== American League final standings ===
AL East
Team	W	L	Pct.	GB	Home	Road
Milwaukee Brewers	62	47	.569	—	28‍–‍21	34‍–‍26
Baltimore Orioles	59	46	.562	1	33‍–‍22	26‍–‍24
New York Yankees	59	48	.551	2	32‍–‍19	27‍–‍29
Detroit Tigers	60	49	.550	2	32‍–‍23	28‍–‍26
Boston Red Sox	59	49	.546	2½	30‍–‍23	29‍–‍26
Cleveland Indians	52	51	.505	7	25‍–‍29	27‍–‍22
Toronto Blue Jays	37	69	.349	23½	17‍–‍36	20‍–‍33

AL East First Half Standings	W	L	Pct.	GB
New York Yankees	34	22	.607	—
Baltimore Orioles	31	23	.574	2
Milwaukee Brewers	31	25	.554	3
Detroit Tigers	31	26	.544	3 1/2
Boston Red Sox	30	26	.536	4
Cleveland Indians	26	24	.520	5
Toronto Blue Jays	16	42	.276	19

AL East Second Half Standings	W	L	Pct.	GB
Milwaukee Brewers	31	22	.585	—
Boston Red Sox	29	23	.558	1 1/2
Detroit Tigers	29	23	.558	1 1/2
Baltimore Orioles	28	23	.549	2
Cleveland Indians	26	27	.491	5
New York Yankees	25	26	.490	5
Toronto Blue Jays	21	27	.438	7 1/2

AL West
Team	W	L	Pct.	GB	Home	Road
Oakland Athletics	64	45	.587	—	35‍–‍21	29‍–‍24
Texas Rangers	57	48	.543	5	32‍–‍24	25‍–‍24
Chicago White Sox	54	52	.509	8½	25‍–‍24	29‍–‍28
Kansas City Royals	50	53	.485	11	19‍–‍28	31‍–‍25
California Angels	51	59	.464	13½	26‍–‍28	25‍–‍31
Seattle Mariners	44	65	.404	20	20‍–‍37	24‍–‍28
Minnesota Twins	41	68	.376	23	24‍–‍36	17‍–‍32

AL West First Half Standings	W	L	Pct.	GB
Oakland Athletics	37	23	.617	—
Texas Rangers	33	22	.600	1 1/2
Chicago White Sox	31	22	.585	2 1/2
California Angels	31	29	.517	6
Kansas City Royals	20	30	.400	12
Seattle Mariners	21	36	.368	14 1/2
Minnesota Twins	17	39	.304	18

AL West Second Half Standings	W	L	Pct.	GB
Kansas City Royals	30	23	.566	—
Oakland Athletics	27	22	.551	1
Texas Rangers	24	26	.480	4 1/2
Minnesota Twins	24	29	.453	6
Seattle Mariners	23	29	.442	6 1/2
Chicago White Sox	23	30	.434	7
California Angels	20	30	.400	8 1/2

Locations of teams for the 1977–1981 American League seasons
West East

=== National League final standings ===
NL East
Team	W	L	Pct.	GB	Home	Road
St. Louis Cardinals	59	43	.578	—	32‍–‍21	27‍–‍22
Montreal Expos	60	48	.556	2	38‍–‍18	22‍–‍30
Philadelphia Phillies	59	48	.551	2½	36‍–‍19	23‍–‍29
Pittsburgh Pirates	46	56	.451	13	22‍–‍28	24‍–‍28
New York Mets	41	62	.398	18½	24‍–‍27	17‍–‍35
Chicago Cubs	38	65	.369	21½	27‍–‍30	11‍–‍35

NL East First Half Standings	W	L	Pct.	GB
Philadelphia Phillies	34	21	.618	—
St. Louis Cardinals	30	20	.600	1 1/2
Montreal Expos	30	25	.545	4
Pittsburgh Pirates	25	23	.521	5 1/2
New York Mets	17	34	.333	15
Chicago Cubs	15	37	.288	17 1/2

NL East Second Half Standings	W	L	Pct.	GB
Montreal Expos	30	23	.566	—
St. Louis Cardinals	29	23	.558	1/2
Philadelphia Phillies	25	27	.481	4 1/2
New York Mets	24	28	.462	5 1/2
Chicago Cubs	23	28	.451	6
Pittsburgh Pirates	21	33	.389	9 1/2

NL West
Team	W	L	Pct.	GB	Home	Road
Cincinnati Reds	66	42	.611	—	32‍–‍22	34‍–‍20
Los Angeles Dodgers	63	47	.573	4	33‍–‍23	30‍–‍24
Houston Astros	61	49	.555	6	31‍–‍20	30‍–‍29
San Francisco Giants	56	55	.505	11½	29‍–‍24	27‍–‍31
Atlanta Braves	50	56	.472	15	22‍–‍27	28‍–‍29
San Diego Padres	41	69	.373	26	20‍–‍35	21‍–‍34

NL West First Half Standings	W	L	Pct.	GB
Los Angeles Dodgers	36	21	.632	—
Cincinnati Reds	35	21	.625	1/2
Houston Astros	28	29	.491	8
Atlanta Braves	25	29	.463	9 1/2
San Francisco Giants	27	32	.458	10
San Diego Padres	23	33	.411	12 1/2

NL West Second Half Standings	W	L	Pct.	GB
Houston Astros	33	20	.623	—
Cincinnati Reds	31	21	.596	1 1/2
San Francisco Giants	29	23	.558	3 1/2
Los Angeles Dodgers	27	26	.509	6
Atlanta Braves	25	27	.481	7 1/2
San Diego Padres	18	36	.333	15 1/2

Locations of teams for the 1977–1992 National League seasons
West East

== Nippon Professional Baseball final standings ==
=== Central League final standings ===
Central League
Team	G	W	L	T	Pct.	GB
Yomiuri Giants	130	73	48	9	.603	–
Hiroshima Toyo Carp	130	67	54	9	.554	6.0
Hanshin Tigers	130	67	58	5	.536	8.0
Yakult Swallows	130	56	58	16	.491	13.5
Chunichi Dragons	130	58	65	7	.472	16.0
Yokohama Taiyo Whales	130	42	80	8	.344	31.5

=== Pacific League final standings ===
Pacific League
Team	G	W	L	T	Pct.	1st half ranking	2nd half ranking
Nippon-Ham Fighters	130	68	54	8	.557	4	1
Hankyu Braves	130	68	58	4	.540	3	2
Lotte Orions	130	63	57	10	.525	1	3
Seibu Lions	130	61	61	8	.500	2	5
Nankai Hawks	130	53	65	12	.449	5	6
Kintetsu Buffaloes	130	54	72	4	.429	6	4

== Events ==
=== January ===
- January 4 – The New York Mets sign left-handed pitcher Dave Roberts, granted free agency from the Seattle Mariners November 4, 1980.
- January 7 – The Chicago Cubs sign relief pitcher Rawly Eastwick, released by the Kansas City Royals on August 21, 1980.
- January 12:
  - The Atlanta Braves sign 42-year-old future Baseball Hall of Fame hurler Gaylord Perry, granted free agency from the New York Yankees last October 23.
  - The Cincinnati Reds sign first baseman Larry Biittner, granted free agency from the Chicago Cubs, also on October 23. The Reds become the last team to sign a free agent under the system established in 1976.
- January 14:
  - Frank Robinson, who became MLB's first African-American manager in 1975 with the Cleveland Indians of the American League, becomes the National League's first black pilot as well, when the San Francisco Giants name him to succeed Dave Bristol at the team's helm. Although the future Baseball Hall of Fame slugger never played for the Giants, Robinson, now 45, grew up in cross-bay Oakland, where he starred at McClymonds High School.
  - Southern California real estate mogul George Argyros, 43, purchases controlling interest in the four-year-old Seattle Mariners for a price between $10.4 million and $12.5M. Four of the six original owners of the expansion team, including Danny Kaye, remain as limited partners.
- January 15:
  - In his first year of eligibility, former St. Louis Cardinals pitcher Bob Gibson is the only person elected this year to the Hall of Fame by the Baseball Writers' Association of America, gathering 337 votes (84.04%). Players falling short of the 301 votes needed for election include Don Drysdale (243), Gil Hodges (241), Harmon Killebrew (239), Hoyt Wilhelm (238) and Juan Marichal (233).
  - The Toronto Blue Jays purchase the contract of utilityman Ken Macha from the Montreal Expos.
- January 21 – The Cincinnati Reds deal veteran centerfielder, two-time World Series champion and 4× Gold Glove Award winner César Gerónimo to the Kansas City Royals for second baseman Germán Barranca.

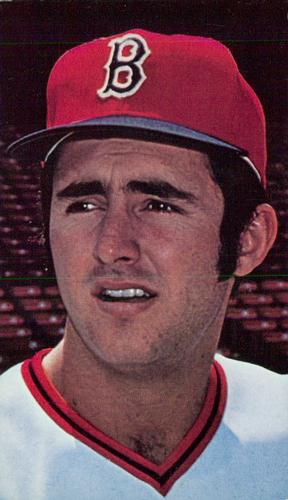
Fred Lynn in 1976

- January 23:
  - In the midst of an arbitration hearing that could grant him total free agency, six-time American League All-Star centerfielder Fred Lynn is hurriedly traded by the Boston Red Sox to the California Angels with veteran pitcher Steve Renko for southpaw Frank Tanana, right-hander Jim Dorsey and 34-year-old outfielder Joe Rudi. The self-inflicted crisis is triggered by the Red Sox' front office, which mailed Lynn's 1981 contract to him two days after the mandated deadline. The Angels immediately sign Lynn to a four-year, $5.25 million contract.
  - With Lynn's trade, catcher Carlton Fisk's arbitration hearing continues in New York. Fisk is also seeking free agency from the Red Sox, stemming from the same contract blunder that forced Boston to trade Lynn while he was still under club control.
  - Granted free agency from the Pittsburgh Pirates last October 22, first baseman John Milner opts to return to Pittsburgh for 1981.
- January 26 – The California Angels sign pitchers Jesse Jefferson and Bill Travers. Jefferson had been granted free agency from the Pirates October 22, while Travers gained free-agent status from the Milwaukee Brewers one month later.
- January 29 – Bill Veeck sells the Chicago White Sox to Jerry Reinsdorf and Eddie Einhorn for a reported $20 million. "Sportshirt Bill," 66, who bought the franchise in December 1975, had placed it on the market in July 1980. The deal ends Veeck's ownership career in Major League Baseball, which began in 1946.

=== February ===
- February 4 – The Chicago White Sox sign free agent shortstop Bill Almon, released by the New York Mets in December 1980. The former first overall pick in the 1974 June amateur draft will hit .301 in 103 games for the 1981 Pale Hose.
- February 5 – The Mets release 33-year-old outfielder Elliott Maddox. He'll play 1981 at Triple-A in the Philadelphia Phillies' system, but never return to the majors.
- February 9 – The San Francisco Giants sign free-agent second baseman Joe Morgan. The future Hall of Famer, now 37, will give the Giants two strong seasons, finishing in the team's top five in wins above replacement each year.
- February 10 – The Oakland Athletics obtain infielder Jimmy Sexton from the Houston Astros for a player to be named later (PTBNL); pitcher Rick Lysander will be added to the deal October 20, 1981.
- February 11 – The Houston Astros trade catcher Bruce Bochy to the New York Mets for two players to be named later. Minor league shortstop Randy Rogers and catcher Stan Hough will be sent to Houston on April 3 to complete the trade.
- February 12:
  - Arbitrator Raymond Goetz rules that catcher Carlton Fisk is a free agent. In December, the Boston Red Sox had mailed his 1981 contract two days late, triggering a grievance, arbitration hearing, and Goetz' ruling. Future Hall-of-Famer Fisk will agree to a five-year, $2.9 million contract with the Chicago White Sox on March 9.
  - The White Sox sign catcher Marc Hill, granted free agency from the Seattle Mariners last November 28. Hill will end up as Fisk's backup receiver into May 1986.
- February 16 – The St. Louis Cardinals acquire shortstop prospect Rafael Santana, 23, from the New York Yankees for pitcher George Frazier, a "PTBNL" who will complete the transaction on June 7, 1981.
- February 17 – Former NL All-Star outfielder Jerry Morales returns to the Chicago Cubs. He had been granted free agency from the New York Mets on October 31, 1980.
- February 18 – The Cleveland Indians release catcher Manny Sanguillén, bringing a close to the three-time All-Star's career.
- February 20 – Louis Nippert, 77, chairman and 90% owner of the Cincinnati Reds, sells control of the franchise to a partnership headed by brothers William Williams and James Williams. Minority partners include future Reds owners Marge Schott and Carl Lindner Jr., as well as Nippert himself. The team's baseball operations remain under the supervision of president and general manager Dick Wagner.
- February 23 – The Pittsburgh Pirates sign pitcher Luis Tiant, 40, granted free agency from the New York Yankees last October 27.
- February 28 – The New York Mets reacquire Dave Kingman from the Chicago Cubs for Steve Henderson and cash. Henderson had come to the Mets from the Cincinnati Reds as part of the infamous "Midnight Massacre" on June 15, 1977, the same day the Mets traded Kingman to the San Diego Padres for Paul Siebert and Bobby Valentine.

=== March ===
- March 1:
  - The Milwaukee Brewers trade outfielder Dick Davis to the Philadelphia Phillies for left-hander Randy Lerch.
  - Pitcher Ed Figueroa signs with the Texas Rangers, returning to the team after being granted free agency last October 22.
- March 3 – The St. Louis Cardinals sign spare outfielder/pinch hitter Steve Braun, granted free agency from the Toronto Blue Jays on November 5.
- March 4 – The San Francisco Giants sell the contract of outfielder Terry Whitfield to the Seibu Lions of the Pacific League in Japan.
- March 7 – The Seattle Mariners obtain veteran slugger Jeff Burroughs from the Atlanta Braves for pitcher Carlos Diaz. Burroughs, the American League MVP in 1974, is traded on his 30th birthday.
- March 11 – Johnny Mize and Rube Foster are elected to the Hall of Fame by the Special Veterans Committee. Mize hit .312 with 359 home runs in 15 seasons for the St. Louis Cardinals, New York Giants and New York Yankees; Foster was a star pitcher, manager and pioneer of the Negro leagues during the first quarter of the 20th century.
- March 18 – Free-agent catcher Carlton Fisk officially signs with the Chicago White Sox. He plays the remainder of his Hall of Fame career in Chicago, before retiring at age 45 in June of 1993.
- March 25 – The Atlanta Braves trade outfielder Gary Matthews to the Philadelphia Phillies for pitcher Bob Walk.
- March 27 – The Oakland Athletics obtain third baseman Kevin Bell and second baseman/outfielder Tony Phillips, then a minor-league prospect, from the San Diego Padres for pitcher Bob Lacey. Two minor-league pitchers, Roy Moretti and Eric Mustad, also change teams.
- March 28 – Chicago's MLB teams collaborate on a trade in which the Cubs acquire left-handed hurler Ken Kravec from the White Sox for right-hander Dennis Lamp.
- March 30:
  - The Minnesota Twins deal centerfielder Ken Landreaux to the Los Angeles Dodgers for outfielder Mickey Hatcher and two prospects, pitcher Mathew Reeves and first baseman Kelly Snider. Landreaux, 26, a native Angeleno, was an American League All-Star in 1980; he'll play seven seasons as a Dodger.
  - The Philadelphia Phillies sell the contract of slugging first baseman and native Chicagoan Greg Luzinski to the White Sox. He'll be the ChiSox' primary designated hitter for the next four seasons.
- March 31:
  - The New York Yankees and San Diego Padres make a six-player trade. The Yankees acquire pitcher John Pacella and outfielder Jerry Mumphrey from the Padres for southpaw pitchers Tim Lollar and Chris Welsh and outfielders Ruppert Jones and Joe Lefebvre.
  - The Kansas City Royals trade outfielder Marvell Wynne and minor-league pitcher John Skinner to the New York Mets for pitcher Juan Berenguer.

=== April ===
- April 1:
  - The California Angels make two major trades. They send first baseman Jason Thompson to the Pittsburgh Pirates for pitcher Mickey Mahler and catcher Ed Ott. Then, they deal starting shortstop Dickie Thon to the Houston Astros for pitcher Ken Forsch. Thompson, 26, is still in his prime; he makes the 1982 National League All-Star team and ties his career-best output of 31 home runs. Thon, 22, appears headed for stardom in Houston, making the 1983 NL All-Star squad and winning a Silver Slugger Award, before his career is disrupted, and permanently altered, on April 8, 1984, when he's hit in the face with a fastball while batting against Mike Torrez of the New York Mets. Forsch gives the Angels three solid seasons as a starting pitcher, but neither Mahler nor Ott contribute to the club's success.
  - The San Diego Padres send recently acquired left-hander Bob Lacey to the Cleveland Indians for second baseman Juan Bonilla.
- April 5 – The Padres acquire left-hander Dave Dravecky from the Pittsburgh Pirates in exchange for minor-league outfielder Bobby Mitchell.
- April 7 – The Kansas City Royals sign catcher Jerry Grote as a free agent.
- April 8 – The 1981 season opens at Riverfront Stadium, where the Cincinnati Reds tally twice in the bottom of the ninth inning for a come-from-behind, 3–2 victory over the defending World Series champion Philadelphia Phillies.

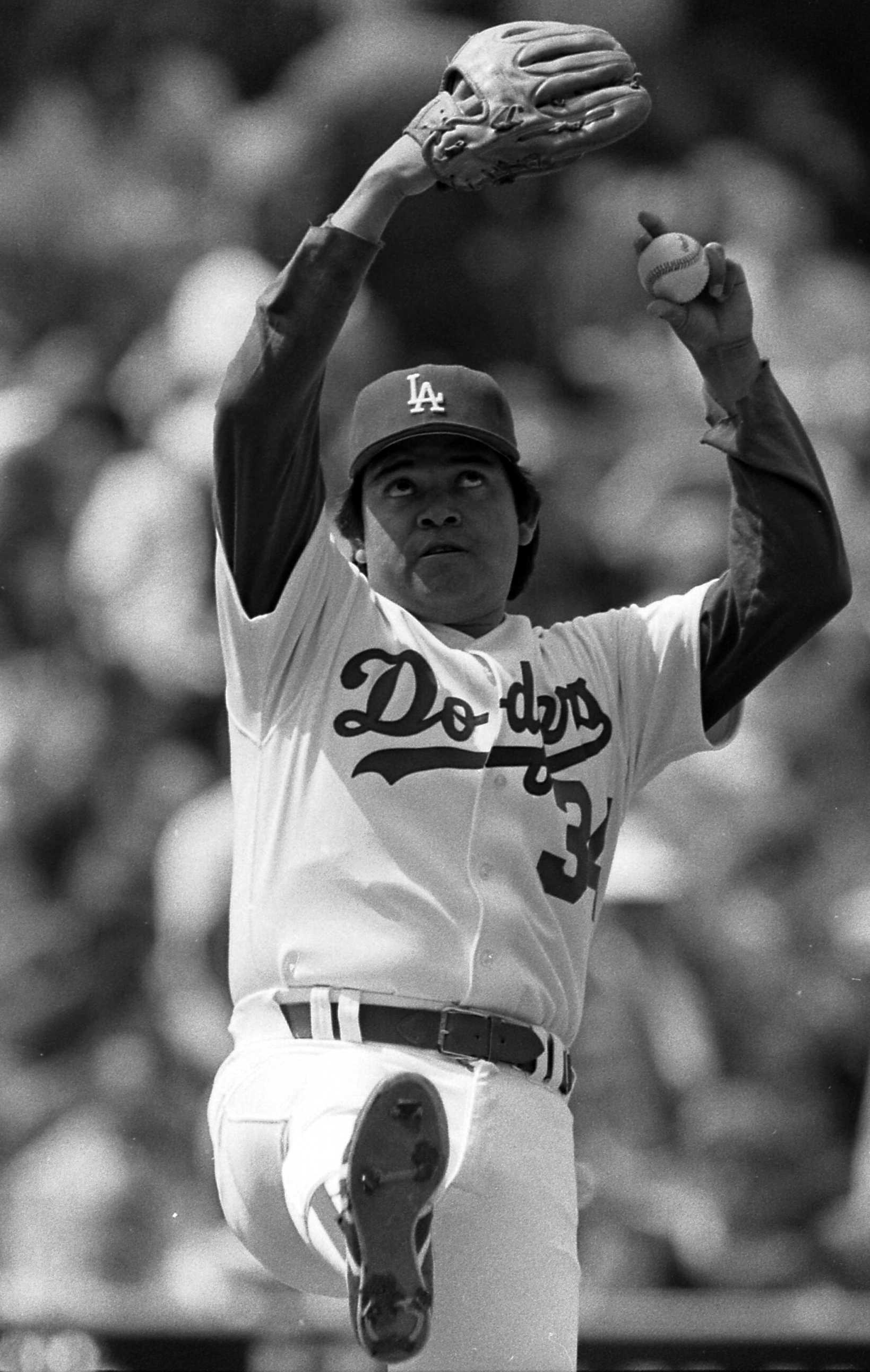
Fernando Valenzuela in full wind-up

- April 9 – After Los Angeles pitcher Jerry Reuss pulls a muscle, Fernando Valenzuela gets his first MLB starting assignment against the Houston Astros on Opening Day at Dodger Stadium. Valenzuela, a rookie southpaw who had baffled National League hitters as a September 1980 call-up (no earned runs and eight hits allowed in ten games and 172/3 innings pitched) promptly throws a five-hit shutout as the Dodgers win, 2–0, beginning what will soon be known as "Fernandomania" across Southern California.
- April 10 – On Opening Day at Fenway Park, Carlton Fisk debuts with the Chicago White Sox against his former team, the Boston Red Sox. In the eighth inning, Fisk belts a three-run home run off reliever Bob Stanley to give Chicago a 3–2 lead, en route to their ultimate, 5–3 triumph. Fisk will go 13-for-30 (.433) in nine games against Boston this year, with three homers and eight runs batted in.
- April 11 – Don Sutton takes the mound at Dodger Stadium, but for the first time in 15 years, he's not pitching for the home team—he's a member of the Houston Astros. The Dodgers welcome their former ace by lighting him up for six runs on eight hits in four innings and defeat the Astros, 7–4.
- April 14 – The Oakland Athletics sign pitcher Chris Codiroli, released by the Detroit Tigers 11 days earlier.
- April 17 – The Texas Rangers sign outfielder Bobby Bonds and assign him to Triple-A Wichita. He had been released by the St. Louis Cardinals on December 22, 1980.
- April 18 – Tom Seaver of the Cincinnati Reds records his 3,000th career strikeout. Keith Hernandez is the victim.
- April 18–19 – Minor league teams from Pawtucket and Rochester clash in a 33-inning game that extends eight hours and 25 minutes; the longest professional baseball game up to that time. Future Hall of Famers Wade Boggs and Cal Ripken Jr. go a combined 6-for-25 in the game.
- April 19 – In Game 1 of a twi-night doubleheader, Billy Martin's Oakland Athletics set a new MLB record by starting a season with 11 consecutive victories with their 6–1 win over the Seattle Mariners before 29,834 fanatics at the Oakland-Alameda Coliseum. The rejuvenated Athletics will draw 1.3 million fans at home in a strike-shortened 1981 season, a 325% increase over their dismal 1979 attendance.
- April 20 – The Houston Astros trade first baseman Dave Bergman and outfielder Jeffrey Leonard to the San Francisco Giants for first baseman Mike Ivie. Later in May, Ivie will be placed on the injured list for depression and will not return to action until September 1.
- April 27 – Just 18 days after his first start, Fernando Valenzuela has grabbed the attention of the baseball world. In his fifth start, he pitches his fourth complete-game shutout (a seven-hitter against the San Francisco Giants at Dodger Stadium before 49,478 fans), running his record to 5–0 with a microscopic 0.20 ERA. He is also batting over .400 to help his own cause.
- April 29:
  - Steve Carlton of the Philadelphia Phillies records his 3,000th career strikeout. April 1981 is the only month in history to see two pitchers reach this milestone, and Carlton is the first left-hander in MLB history to accomplish this feat.
  - After 13 scoreless innings, the Toronto Blue Jays break through with five runs in the top of the 14th to defeat the Milwaukee Brewers, 5–0, at County Stadium.

=== May ===
- May 3 – "Fernandomania" rolls on as rookie Fernando Valenzuela wins his sixth straight start of 1981, allowing five hits over nine innings at Olympic Stadium. He leaves for a pinch hitter (Reggie Smith) in the top of the tenth of a 1–1 tie—then the Dodgers score five runs and reliever Steve Howe preserves Valenzuela's 6–1 victory over the Montreal Expos. It's the first time in 1981 that Valenzuela requires relief help and the nine-inning effort is the only occasion during his eight-game, season-opening winning streak when he does not throw a complete game.
- May 5 – Maury Wills' tenure as manager of the Seattle Mariners (6–18 and last in the AL West) ends when he's replaced by Rene Lachemann at the team's helm. The former star shortstop struggled as the Mariners' skipper, posting a 26–56 (.317) mark since August 4, 1980. Lachemann, 36, is promoted from Triple-A Spokane; as a teenager, he was a batboy for the Los Angeles Dodgers during Wills' first four MLB seasons.
- May 10 – In the second game of a doubleheader, Charlie Lea of the Montreal Expos no-hits the San Francisco Giants 4–0. The no-hitter is the first in the history of Olympic Stadium, which will witness only one other no-hitter, by Philadelphia's Tommy Greene in 1991.
- May 14 – Fernando Valenzuela wins his eighth straight start, tossing a complete-game, three-hit, 3–2 triumph over the Montreal Expos at Dodger Stadium before 53,906.
- May 15 – Len Barker of the Cleveland Indians pitches a perfect game against the Toronto Blue Jays, 3–0, at Cleveland Municipal Stadium. He strikes out 11, all swinging, after the third inning and never has a three-ball count on any batter. Only 7,290 fans take in the game on a misty, rain-soaked night. Future Indians broadcaster Rick Manning catches the 27th out of the night on a fly ball to center field. On July 28, 1991, Barker's batterymate, Ron Hassey, will catch Dennis Martínez's perfect game, to become the first man in MLB history to catch two perfect games.
- May 18 – At Dodger Stadium, the Philadelphia Phillies hand Fernando Valenzuela his first career loss in the major leagues, 4–0. Valenzeula permits only three hits over nine innings, but one of them is a Mike Schmidt solo blast. The Phils' Marty Bystrom and Ron Reed combine for the shutout.
- May 21:
  - The Minnesota Twins change managers for the second time since August 24, 1980; today, Johnny Goryl is relieved of command of the 11–25 club and is replaced by coach Billy Gardner. Goryl, 47, and Gardner, 53, are both former Twins and ex-second basemen.
  - Ron Darling of Yale University pitches a no-hitter through 11 innings against St. John's University. In the 12th inning, St. John's breaks up the no-hitter and then scores on a double-steal to beat Yale 1–0. Darling's performance remains the longest no-hitter in NCAA history and the game is considered by some to be the best in college baseball history. Frank Viola is the opposing pitcher for St. John's.
- May 22 – Bob Kennedy, general manager of the Chicago Cubs since November 1976, resigns after the Cubs lose 27 of their first 33 games of 1981. He's replaced by former field manager Herman Franks, a veteran baseball man who has built a highly successful business career away from the diamond. But Franks, 67, will serve less than five months in the post: the Cubs will be sold by the Wrigley family a month from now, and a new management team will be brought in after the season.
- May 25 – Carl Yastrzemski plays in his 3,000th major league game, scoring the winning run in Boston's 8–7 triumph over Cleveland. Yaz joins Ty Cobb, Stan Musial and Hank Aaron as the fourth major leaguer to appear in 3,000 games.
- May 27 – While visiting the Seattle Kingdome, Kansas City Royals centerfielder Amos Otis hits a slow roller down the third base line in the sixth inning. Seattle Mariners third baseman Lenny Randle gets on his hands and knees and tries unsuccessfully to blow the ball foul.
- May 29:
  - The New York Mets trade relief pitcher Jeff Reardon and outfielder Dan Norman to the Montreal Expos for outfielder Ellis Valentine.
  - The 22–25 California Angels, seven games out of first place in the AL West, replace manager Jim Fregosi with veteran big-league pilot Gene Mauch. Fregosi led the Halos to their first-ever playoff appearance in 1979, but his 1980 club lost 95 games. Mauch, 55, most recently led the Minnesota Twins until his August 24, 1980, resignation; 1981 marks his 22nd consecutive season as an MLB manager.

=== June ===
- June 3 – Making his return to the majors after a two year absence, catcher Jerry Grote hits a home run to help the Kansas City Royals defeat the Seattle Mariners 12–9.
- June 5 – Nolan Ryan issues the 1,777th walk in his career, breaking the record previously held by Early Wynn.
- June 7 – In one of the decade's more one-sided transactions, the Houston Astros trade pitcher Joaquín Andújar to the St. Louis Cardinals for outfielder Tony Scott. Andújar will win 68 games for the Redbirds and help lead them to two NL pennants and the 1982 World Series title; Scott hits .249 (matching his career batting average) in 292 games for Houston.
- June 8 – The Seattle Mariners select pitcher Mike Moore of Oral Roberts University as the first player taken in the June amateur draft. The Chicago Cubs draft outfielder Joe Carter with their first round selection, second overall. Future Hall-of-Famer Tony Gwynn of San Diego State is chosen by the Padres in the third round, 58th overall.
- June 10 – Pete Rose connects with a Nolan Ryan pitch in his first at-bat for the 3,630th base hit of his career, tying Stan Musial's National League record. He will strike out in his next three at-bats in the game, however, in his bid to break the record.
- June 12:
  - After meeting with major league owners for most of the previous day, players' union chief Marvin Miller announces, "We have accomplished nothing. The strike is on", thus beginning the longest labor action to date in baseball history. By the time the season resumes on August 10, 712 games (nearly 34 percent of the MLB schedule) will have been canceled. Minor League Baseball games are not affected.
  - Prior to the work stoppage, the New York Yankees obtain veteran starting pitcher Rick Reuschel from the Chicago Cubs for pitchers Doug Bird and Mike Griffin ("PTBNL") and a $400,000 cash payment. "Big Daddy" will go 4–4 (2.67) for the rest of the American League season, start Game 4 of the 1981 World Series for the Yanks, then miss the entire 1982 campaign with a rotator cuff injury.
- June 16 – In the midst of the players' strike, William Wrigley III announces the sale of the Chicago Cubs to the Tribune Company for $20 million. The transaction ends the Wrigley family's 65-year-long association with the Cubs, 63 of them as majority or sole owners of the franchise.
- June 20 – Bernie Carbo signs a minor league deal with his hometown team, the Detroit Tigers. He plays in just 19 games for their Triple-A team in Evansville.
- June 23 – The Pawtucket Red Sox beat the Rochester Red Wings, 3–2, in the 33rd inning of the longest game in professional baseball history. This game had started 67 days earlier was halted in the early morning of April 19, with the score tied 2–2 after 32 innings and more than eight hours of game time. It ends 18 minutes after it resumes today, with Dave Koza's RBI single delivering Marty Barrett's winning run. Future Hall of Famers Wade Boggs and Cal Ripken Jr. participates for Pawtucket and Rochester, respectively.

=== July ===
- July 6 – The Chicago White Sox sign veteran pitcher Jim Barr, released by the California Angels on April 1. With the MLB players' strike raging, Barr, 33, will appear in ten games for Triple-A Edmonton before drawing his release from the ChiSox September 4.
- July 8 – The San Francisco Giants shake up their front office during the work stoppage, firing general manager Spec Richardson and promoting farm system director Tom Haller to replace him. Haller, 44, made two National League All-Star teams as the Giants' power-hitting catcher between 1961 and 1967.
- July 11 – The Pittsburgh Pirates sign undrafted amateur free agent Bobby Bonilla, a future six-time NL All-Star. Bonilla, 18, a South Bronx native, is "discovered" by future Pirates general manager Syd Thrift while playing summer baseball in Scandinavia.
- July 12 – The Philadelphia Phillies sign undrafted amateur free agent catcher Mike LaValliere. The native of Manchester, New Hampshire, will go on to appear in 879 games in MLB for four teams, and win a Gold Glove Award in 1987.
- July 31 – Seven weeks after it began, MLB owners and the Players' Association reach an agreement that will end the 1981 Major League Baseball strike. However, games will not resume until August 9, with a rescheduled 1981 Major League Baseball All-Star Game.

=== August ===
- August 4 – The San Francisco Giants, 27–32 and ten games out of first place in the NL West when the strike struck, release two veterans, pitcher Randy Moffitt and outfielder Bill North. The day earlier, the Giants had cut another veteran, catcher Mike Sadek.
- August 6 – As a result of the nearly two-month interruption in play because of the strike, major league owners elect to split the 1981 season into two halves, with the first-place teams from each half in each division (or a wild card team if the same club wins both halves) meeting in a best-of-five divisional playoff series. The last time the major leagues played a split season was 1892. The Oakland Athletics, New York Yankees, Philadelphia Phillies and Los Angeles Dodgers suddenly find themselves guaranteed playoff spots as first-half champions (a problem noted at this time is that those teams will not have much left to play for in the rest of that year's regular season).
- August 8 – The Kansas City Royals sell the contract of ineffective right-hander Juan Berenguer (0–4, 8.69) to the Toronto Blue Jays.

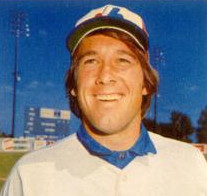
1981 All-Star Game MVP Gary Carter

- August 9:
  - At Cleveland Stadium, the National League wins its tenth consecutive All-Star Game over the American League, 5–4. Gary Carter hits two home runs and is selected the MVP. The 1981 Midsummer Classic becomes the second All-Star Game ever played during the month of August, the first having taken place on August 3, 1959.
  - The Texas Rangers claim outfielder Tom Poquette on waivers from the Boston Red Sox.
- August 10:
  - The MLB regular season resumes, and the "second half" begins, following the nearly two-month strike.
  - Pete Rose singles in the eighth inning off Mark Littell of the St. Louis Cardinals to break Stan Musial's National League record for career hits; it's Rose's 3,631st career safety.
  - Cal Ripken Jr. makes his major league debut for the Baltimore Orioles in an extra-inning, 3–2 victory over the Kansas City Royals at Memorial Stadium. The 20-year-old enters the game as a pinch runner in the bottom of the 12th for Ken Singleton, who had doubled, and promptly scores the winning run on a single by John Lowenstein.
- August 12 – Veteran outfielder Joe Rudi, who entered the game hitting .147 in 21 games as a part-time starter, rips a pair of home runs to lead a six-homer barrage, and rookie Bobby Ojeda fires a complete game for his first MLB victory, in an 8–1 Boston Red Sox triumph over the Chicago White Sox at Fenway Park.
- August 19 – The New York Yankees trade infield prospect Pat Tabler to the Chicago Cubs for two players to be named later, pitchers Bill Caudill and Jay Howell; both are not added to the transaction until 1982.
- August 20 – The Montreal Expos and division-rival Pittsburgh Pirates exchange veteran first basemen when Montreal sends Willie Montañez, 33, to Pittsburgh for John Milner, 31.
- August 24:
  - Kent Hrbek, who attended high school in suburban Bloomington—site of Metropolitan Stadium—enjoys a memorable debut with the Minnesota Twins when the 21-year-old's 12th-inning home run beats the Yankees 3–2 in New York. Hrbek will go on to have a 14-year career with his hometown team and earn World Series rings in 1987 and 1991.
  - During a heated argument over a disputed call at second base, National League umpire Steve Fields ejects Philadelphia Phillies shortstop Larry Bowa and manager Dallas Green from the game. Green then bumps into Fields and grabs the cap off the umpire's head and throws it on the ground. Green is suspended for five games, but Fields' fellow umpires—Nick Colosi, Frank Pulli, and Eric Gregg—draw criticism for not coming to Fields' aid during the imbroglio. Fields had crossed picket lines during the 1979 Major League umpires strike when he was a minor-league official and is reviled by MLUA members as a strikebreaker. The NL fines Colosi and Pulli for shoving a television reporter who, after the game, noted their shunning of the beleaguered Fields. The NL will fire Fields after the season based on low performance ratings, and he'll file, and later drop, a $1 million lawsuit against MLB.
- August 26 – Responding to boos and alleged racial invective from hometown fans, St. Louis Cardinals shortstop Garry Templeton, a two-time NL All-Star, makes a series of obscene gestures towards the stands during the first three innings of a game at Busch Memorial Stadium. After the final one, which occurs as he waits in the on-deck circle, Templeton is ejected by umpire Bruce Froemming, then physically removed from the field and confronted in the Cardinal dugout by manager Whitey Herzog, fined $5,000, and suspended indefinitely. He returns to action September 15 and goes four-for-five in a 3–2 Redbird victory at Montreal, but his days with the Cardinals are numbered.
- August 30:
  - Jim Frey—who won the 1980 American League pennant in his rookie season as a manager—is sacked by the Kansas City Royals and replaced by Dick Howser, the skipper of the team the Royals defeated in the 1980 ALCS. The Royals went only 20–30 in the first half of 1981's split-season (ended by the midsummer players' strike), and today they stand 10–10 and in second place in the AL West's second-half derby. Howser will lead them to a 20–13 mark through season's end—good enough for a postseason appearance.
  - The Chicago White Sox acquire veteran southpaw Jerry Koosman from the Minnesota Twins for cash, two minor-leaguers, and a "PTBNL," DH/pinch-hitter Randy Johnson.
- August 31 – The Houston Astros obtain three-time All-Star second baseman Phil Garner, 32, from the Pittsburgh Pirates for second baseman Johnny Ray, 24, and two players to be named later, pitchers Randy Niemann and Kevin Houston.

=== September ===
- September 1 – The Montreal Expos purchase the contract of southpaw reliever Grant Jackson, 38, from the Pittsburgh Pirates.
- September 3 – The St. Louis Cardinals sell the contract of pitcher Donnie Moore to the Milwaukee Brewers.
- September 4 – In the conclusion of the longest game in Fenway Park history, the Seattle Mariners defeat the Boston Red Sox 8–7 in 20 innings on Joe Simpson's RBI triple. The game had begun September 3, but was suspended after 19 innings with the score tied 7–7.
- September 6:
  - Despite having won the first-half AL East title, New York Yankees manager Gene Michael is replaced by Bob Lemon, who managed the club in 1978–1979. The Yankees are 15–12 during the second half of 1981's split season, and 49–34 overall.
  - The Los Angeles Dodgers' Fernando Valenzuela beats the St. Louis Cardinals 5–0 to tie the National League record of seven shutouts by a rookie pitcher.
- September 7 – Dick Williams, the flinty, hard-nosed manager who led the Montreal Expos to their first over-.500 and contending seasons in 1979 and 1980, is fired and replaced by former MLB catcher and longtime Expo front-office executive Jim Fanning. The 1981 Expos, 44–37 overall, are battling for a playoff berth and must win the NL East's second half to qualify for the postseason; after today, they're 14–12 and 1½ games out of first place.
- September 12 – In The Bronx, rookie left-hander Bobby Ojeda of the Boston Red Sox takes a no-hitter and a 2–0 lead into the bottom of the ninth against the New York Yankees before back-to-back doubles by Rick Cerone and Dave Winfield chase him from the game. Reliever Mark Clear enters and secures the final three outs and a 2–1 Bosox victory. The two-hitter is Ojeda's fifth victory of 1981, and Clear notches his eighth save.
- September 19 – Pete Falcone becomes the first New York Mets pitcher to hurl a complete game since May 29, 1981, as his club beats the first-place St. Louis Cardinals, 6–2.
- September 21 – At Olympic Stadium, the Philadelphia Phillies and Montreal Expos take 161/3 innings to settle a scoreless duel. With starters Steve Carlton and Ray Burris each going ten shutout frames before the bullpens take over, the Phils use six pitchers and the Expos five. Finally, in the home 17th, Andre Dawson's RBI single delivers Rodney Scott with the game's only run. Their victory enables the Expos keep pace with the front-running Cardinals.
- September 26 – Nolan Ryan of the Houston Astros breaks Sandy Koufax's record of four no hitters by pitching his fifth career no-hit game. The record is set in the Astrodome against, coincidentally, Koufax's old team, the Los Angeles Dodgers.
- September 30 – The Kansas City Royals defeat the Minnesota Twins, 5–2, in the last Major League game to be played at Metropolitan Stadium, as the Twins prepare to move into the new Hubert H. Humphrey Metrodome. Clint Hurdle hits the last outdoor Major League home run in Minnesota until Target Field opens twenty-eight seasons later in 2010.

=== October ===
- October 2–4:
  - The split-season format adopted because of the players' strike—and the decision that only the division champions of each half-season will qualify for the postseason—results in both National League teams with the best full-season won–lost records in their divisions, the Cincinnati Reds and St. Louis Cardinals, finding themselves on the sidelines when the regular season's final weekend ends.
    - In the NL West, the Houston Astros maintain a 1½-game lead over the Reds when each team goes 1–2 over the weekend's three contests. The Astros (28–29 in the first half, 33–20 in the second half, 61–49 overall) gain the playoff berth, while Cincinnati (35–21, 31–21, 66–42 overall), goes home. The Reds had lost the first-half crown by a half-game to the Los Angeles Dodgers (36–21, 27–26, 63–47), who will face Houston in the 1981 NL Division Series.
    - In the NL East, the Montreal Expos begin the weekend with a two-game edge over the Cardinals in the second half, with three to play, for the right to play the first-half champion Philadelphia Phillies. On Friday night, Steve Rogers' 3–0 two-hit victory over the New York Mets at Shea Stadium, and the Cardinals' 8–7 defeat by the Pittsburgh Pirates, clinches the 13-year-old Canadian franchise's first-ever postseason berth. The teams then split their final two games of the second half. The Expos (30–25, 30–23, 60–48 overall) move on to face the Phillies (34–21, 25–27, 59–48) in the NLDS, and the Cardinals (30–20, 29–23, 59–43) go home.
  - The American League also sees two cliff-hangers in their divisional races.
    - In the AL East, four teams are within two games of the second-half gonfalon when the closing weekend begins. The first-place Milwaukee Brewers take two out of three games from the contending Detroit Tigers at County Stadium, while the other contenders, the Baltimore Orioles and Boston Red Sox, cannot sweep their foes and overcome the Brewers. Milwaukee (31–25, 31–22, 62–47 overall) takes the second-half title, and the franchise's first-ever American League playoff berth, and will face the first-half champion New York Yankees (34–22, 25–26, 59–48) in the 1981 American League Division Series.
    - In the AL West, the Kansas City Royals, who enter Friday's games with a 1½-game second-half edge over the first-half champion Oakland Athletics, go head-to-head with Oakland over the weekend. By taking two out of three games at Royals Stadium, the Athletics force Kansas City to play a make-up game tomorrow at Cleveland Stadium against the Indians to decide the second-half division champion and determine the ALDS schedule.
- October 5:
  - The Royals (20–30, 30–23, 50–53 overall) shut out Cleveland 9–0 in the first game of a scheduled doubleheader to clinch the second-half title in the AL West. The second game is canceled. Kansas City will face Oakland (37–23, 27–22, 64–45) in the ALDS, and host Games 1 and 2. If 1981's overall standings had counted, the Royals would have finished 11 games behind the Athletics.
  - Joe Torre of the New York Mets is fired from his first MLB managing job, after leading them to a 286–420–3 (.407) record since he took on the assignment on May 31, 1977. Says a philosophical Torre after his dismissal: "I've been here a long time for a club that wasn't winning. You know when you're hired that you're going to be fired."
  - Mark Fidrych, battling arm problems, is released by the Detroit Tigers. In 1976, Fidrych was the American League Rookie of the Year and an All-Star and became a pop culture figure in baseball.
- October 7:
  - The Kansas City Royals promote Joe Burke to club president and elevate Burke's top assistant, John Schuerholz, to general manager. Burke, 57, has been GM since June 1974. For Schuerholz, 41, the promotion is a major milestone in what will be a Hall of Fame executive career.
  - Bobby Mattick steps down after two seasons as manager of the Toronto Blue Jays. In Years 4 and 5 of the expansion team's history, Mattick, a highly respected veteran scout and player development official, led the Jays to a 104–164 (.388) record.
  - First baseman Warren Cromartie of the Montreal Expos catches a liner hit by Phillies infielder Manny Trillo for the final out of a 3–1 Montreal victory at Olympic Stadium in Game 1 of the 1981 NLDS—the first postseason baseball game played outside the USA. Cromartie celebrates by taking a Canadian flag from an Expos fan and runs to the Phillies dugout, waving the flag, drawing boos and jeers from the remaining Phillies fans.
- October 8 – Another managerial head rolls when the Atlanta Braves fire fourth-year manager Bobby Cox, who posted a 266–323–1 (.452) record in his first-ever chance to skipper a big-league club. Owner Ted Turner says he wants a "fresh face" to lead the Braves. "If Bobby wasn't here, he'd be one of the leading candidates for the job."
- October 11 – The first-ever postseason divisional series conclude. Three of the matchups go the full five games.
  - In the National League, the Los Angeles Dodgers shut out the visiting Houston Astros, 4–0, behind Jerry Reuss to capture the NL West, and the Montreal Expos' Steve Rogers blanks the Philadelphia Phillies, 3–0, to dethrone the defending world champions and win the NL East, the first and only division title in the team's Montréal history.
  - In the American League, the New York Yankees eliminate the Milwaukee Brewers, 7–3, on the strength of three home runs, including one from "Mister October," Reggie Jackson, to gain their fifth AL East crown in six years. They will face the AL West champions, the Billy Martin-led Oakland Athletics, who on October 9 had completed a three-game sweep of the Kansas City Royals, in the upcoming League Championship Series.
- October 15:
  - The Yankees make quick work of the Athletics, sweeping the best-of-five 1981 ALCS in three straight and outscoring Billy Martin's squad, 20–4. The Bombers capture their 33rd American League pennant in the franchise's 81-year history, with all occurring since 1921.
  - Dallas Green, who managed the 1980 Philadelphia Phillies to the first World Series championship in their history, departs for the division rival Chicago Cubs to become their executive vice president and general manager. His hiring is the first major move by the Cubs' new owners, The Tribune Company, and it pays dividends. Importing front-office aides, scouts, coaches, and—most important—playing talent from the successful Phillies organization over the next two seasons, the forceful Green sees the Cubs rise from having the worst overall record in the NL East in 1981 to a division championship three years later.
  - The Toronto Blue Jays hire Bobby Cox as the third manager in their five-year history. Cox will lead the Blue Jays to a 355–292–1 (.549) record and the 1985 AL East championship before returning to the Atlanta Braves as their general manager in 1986 on his path to the Baseball Hall of Fame.

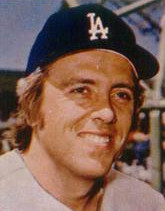
Rick Monday

- October 19 – On a day that will be remembered in Montréal as "Blue Monday", Rick Monday hits a ninth-inning home run to break a 1–1 tie, and secure a Game 5 victory for the Los Angeles Dodgers over the Montreal Expos in the best-of-five 1981 National League Championship Series. The Expos had been leading the series, two games to one, but lose the final two contests in what will prove to be the franchise's last postseason appearance in its 36 years in the Québec metropolis. The Dodgers win their 20th National League championship, and 17th of the post-1901, "modern" era.
- October 20 – Pitching guru and former Milwaukee Brewers pilot George Bamberger becomes manager of the New York Mets. Bamberger, 58, led the Brewers to a 235–180 (.566) record between 1978 and 1980. He also served as pitching coach of the Baltimore Orioles for eight seasons when Mets' front-office boss Frank Cashen was Baltimore's top executive.
- October 21 – While the parent team is engaging the Los Angeles Dodgers in Game 2 of the 1981 World Series, the New York Yankees trade minor-league outfielder Willie McGee to the St. Louis Cardinals for pitcher Bob Sykes. McGee, 22, spent 1981 with Yanks' Double-A Nashville affiliate. He'll become an All-Star for the Cardinals, while Sykes will never pitch an MLB game for the Yankees and be out of organized baseball after the 1982 season.
- October 22 – Joe Torre replaces Bobby Cox as manager of the Atlanta Braves. In 1982, Torre will lead the Braves to their second-ever NL West title, his first winning season and postseason appearance in what will become a Hall-of-Fame managerial career.
- October 23 – The roll-out of new managers continues when the Chicago Cubs hire Lee Elia to succeed Joey Amalfitano as their skipper. Amalfitano was let go after compiling a cumulative 66–116–3 (.363) record as interim manager (September 1979) then official skipper (July 25, 1980 through 1981). Elia, 44, is an associate of new Cubs' front-office boss Dallas Green, having served as a coach under Green with the Philadelphia Phillies in 1980 and 1981.
- October 26 – George Steinbrenner hits the headlines after his New York Yankees drop Game 5 of the 1981 World Series to the home-standing Dodgers. Riding in an elevator at Los Angeles' Hyatt-Wilshire Hotel, the 51-year-old owner injures his left hand and suffers a cut lip, allegedly after scuffling with two Dodger fans who had ridiculed the Yankees and their fanbase. The two "young men", whom Steinbrenner says he "clocked" and left on the floor of the elevator, are never found nor identified.
- October 28:
  - Pedro Guerrero drives in five runs, and pitcher Burt Hooton and the visiting Los Angeles Dodgers beat the New York Yankees, 9–2, to win the 1981 World Series in six games. In a remarkable postseason, the Dodgers came from behind in all three series, rallying from a two-games-to-none deficit against the Astros to win the NL West, a 2–1 deficit against the Expos in the 1981 NLCS, and a 2–0 deficit in the Fall Classic. Guerrero, Ron Cey and Steve Yeager are named co-MVPs.
  - Yankees pitcher George Frazier makes dubious history when he is charged with the loss in Game 6, making him the first pitcher with three losses in a best-of-seven-formatted Fall Classic. Lefty Williams of the Chicago White Sox also lost three contests during the best-of-nine 1919 World Series. (Williams will be among the "Eight Men Out" banned from baseball in the wake of the Black Sox Scandal that tainted that year's outcome.)
- October 29 – Third-generation owner Ruly Carpenter sells the Philadelphia Phillies to a five-member investment group that includes club executive Bill Giles, son of the late president of the National League, for $30.175 million—the highest price then paid for a baseball franchise. Carpenter's grandfather and father had purchased the Phillies for $500,000 in 1943. Carpenter put the team on the market in May 1981, citing rising player salaries.

=== November ===
- November 4:
  - The Cincinnati Reds trade three-time All-Star outfielder Ken Griffey Sr. to the New York Yankees for minor-league pitcher Brian Ryder and a player to be named later. The Bombers subsequently sign Griffey, 31, to a six-year, $6.25 million contract extension. On December 9, the Yankees transfer hurler Freddie Toliver to the Reds to complete the trade.
  - The Philadelphia Phillies fill their managerial vacancy by appointing Pat Corrales, a former Phillie catcher who managed the 1979–1980 Texas Rangers, their pilot for 1982. Corrales succeeds Dallas Green, who quit in mid-October to become the Chicago Cubs' top baseball official.
- November 11 – Fernando Valenzuela of the Los Angeles Dodgers wins the National League Cy Young Award, becoming the first rookie to win the award.
- November 13 – Forty-one MLB players are granted free agency after playing out their contracts. They include future Hall of Famers Reggie Jackson and Ferguson Jenkins and luminaries such as Joaquín Andújar, Ron Guidry, Rick Monday, Bobby Murcer, Jerry Remy and Reggie Smith.
- November 14 – The Cleveland Indians trade second baseman Duane Kuiper to the San Francisco Giants for pitcher Ed Whitson. Kuiper, 31, is destined to become a popular, longtime member of the Giants' broadcasting team after his playing days end in 1985.
- November 16 – The Chicago Cubs steal a crucial free agent from their South Side rivals, when the parent Tribune Company's WGN-TV signs Harry Caray as their play-by-play broadcaster away from the White Sox. Already a legend over his 37-year career, which began as the voice of the Cubs' NL arch-rivals, the St. Louis Cardinals, Caray, now 67, has been the star of the White Sox' radio/TV booth since 1971. He'll manage to eclipse his earlier fame over the next 16 years as the face of the Cubs' broadcasts on superstation WGN-TV until his death prior to the 1998 season.
- November 18
  - A frenetic year of managerial changes comes to an end when the San Diego Padres name Dick Williams to replace Frank Howard as their 1982 field leader. Williams, 52, had been fired by the contending Montreal Expos in early September; the towering Howard, a fearsome slugger in his playing days, posted a 41–69 (.373) mark in his one, strike-curtailed season in San Diego. During calendar year 1981, 13 of the 26 big-league teams change managers.
  - Future Hall-of-Fame third baseman Mike Schmidt of the Philadelphia Phillies wins his second straight National League Most Valuable Player Award, taking 21 of 24 first-place votes. Andre Dawson (two) and Fernando Valenzuela (one) capture the rest. Schmidt, 32, led the NL in 11 offensive categories during 1981's strike-shortened campaign. He also won his sixth straight Gold Glove Award.
- November 20 – In a five-player, three-team trade, the Cleveland Indians send catcher Bo Díaz to the Philadelphia Phillies; the Phillies deal outfielder Lonnie Smith to the St. Louis Cardinals; the Cardinals trade pitchers Silvio Martinez and Lary Sorensen to the Indians, and the Phillies send Cleveland a player to be named later (pitcher Scott Munninghoff) to complete the transaction.
- November 25 – Rollie Fingers of the Milwaukee Brewers becomes the first relief pitcher ever to win the American League Most Valuable Player Award, edging out Rickey Henderson of the Oakland Athletics, 319 to 308. Earlier in the month crowned the winner of the AL's 1981 Cy Young Award, Fingers saved 28 games while posting a microscopic 1.04 ERA.
- November 27 – In a swap of AL All-Star outfielders, the Detroit Tigers send left-handed-swinging Steve Kemp to the Chicago White Sox for the right-handed Chet Lemon.

=== December ===
- December 2:
  - Fernando Valenzuela becomes the third consecutive Los Angeles Dodgers player to be named National League Rookie of the Year. The Mexican left-hander posted a 13–7 record with a 2.48 ERA and led the NL in strikeouts (180), games started (25), complete games (11), shutouts (eight) and innings pitched (192 1/3). His 13 wins tied him with Steve Carlton in second place behind Tom Seaver, who finished with 14. Valenzuela also made his first All-Star appearance and received both the Cy Young Award and TSN Rookie of the Year.
  - The Dodgers also re-sign veteran outfielder Rick Monday, who had been granted free agency almost three weeks earlier.
- December 4 – The Oakland Athletics welcome back a member of their 1971–1975 dynasty, outfielder Joe Rudi, recently granted free agency from the Boston Red Sox. One of the first Seitz-era free agents, he had departed Oakland in November 1976. Rudi, 35, will appear in 71 games during 1982, his last in the majors.
- December 6 – The Philadelphia Phillies sell the contract of three-time NL All Star catcher Bob Boone, a 2× winner of the Gold Glove Award, to the California Angels. Boone, 34, will be the Angels' first string catcher, and add three more Gold Gloves to his trophy case, through 1988.
- December 8:
  - Newly hired Chicago Cubs general manager Dallas Green swings his first major trade, acquiring pitchers Dickie Noles and Dan Larson and outfielder/catcher Keith Moreland from his former team, the Phillies, for pitcher Mike Krukow and cash.
  - The Cubs also bring back future Hall of Fame pitcher Ferguson Jenkins, signing the 38-year-old after he was granted free agency from the Texas Rangers. Jenkins won 20 or more games for six straight seasons (1967–1972) during his earlier tenure as a Cub.
  - The Boston Red Sox re-sign popular second baseman Jerry Remy, who had been granted free agency almost four weeks earlier.
- December 9:
  - The Cleveland Indians trade veteran outfielder Jorge Orta and two prospects, pitcher Larry White and catcher Jack Fimple, to the Los Angeles Dodgers for starting pitcher and 1979 NL Rookie of the Year Rick Sutcliffe, only 25, and second baseman Jack Perconte.
  - The Detroit Tigers deal two left-handed pitchers, Mike Chris and Dan Schatzeder, to the San Francisco Giants for outfielder Larry Herndon.
  - The Seattle Mariners make two separate trades with the division-rival Oakland Athletics. One sees Seattle send first baseman Dan Meyer to Oakland for right-handed pitcher Rich Bordi. In the other, the Ms deal outfielder Rusty McNealy and minor-league pitcher Tim Hallgren to the Athletics for right-hander Roy Thomas.

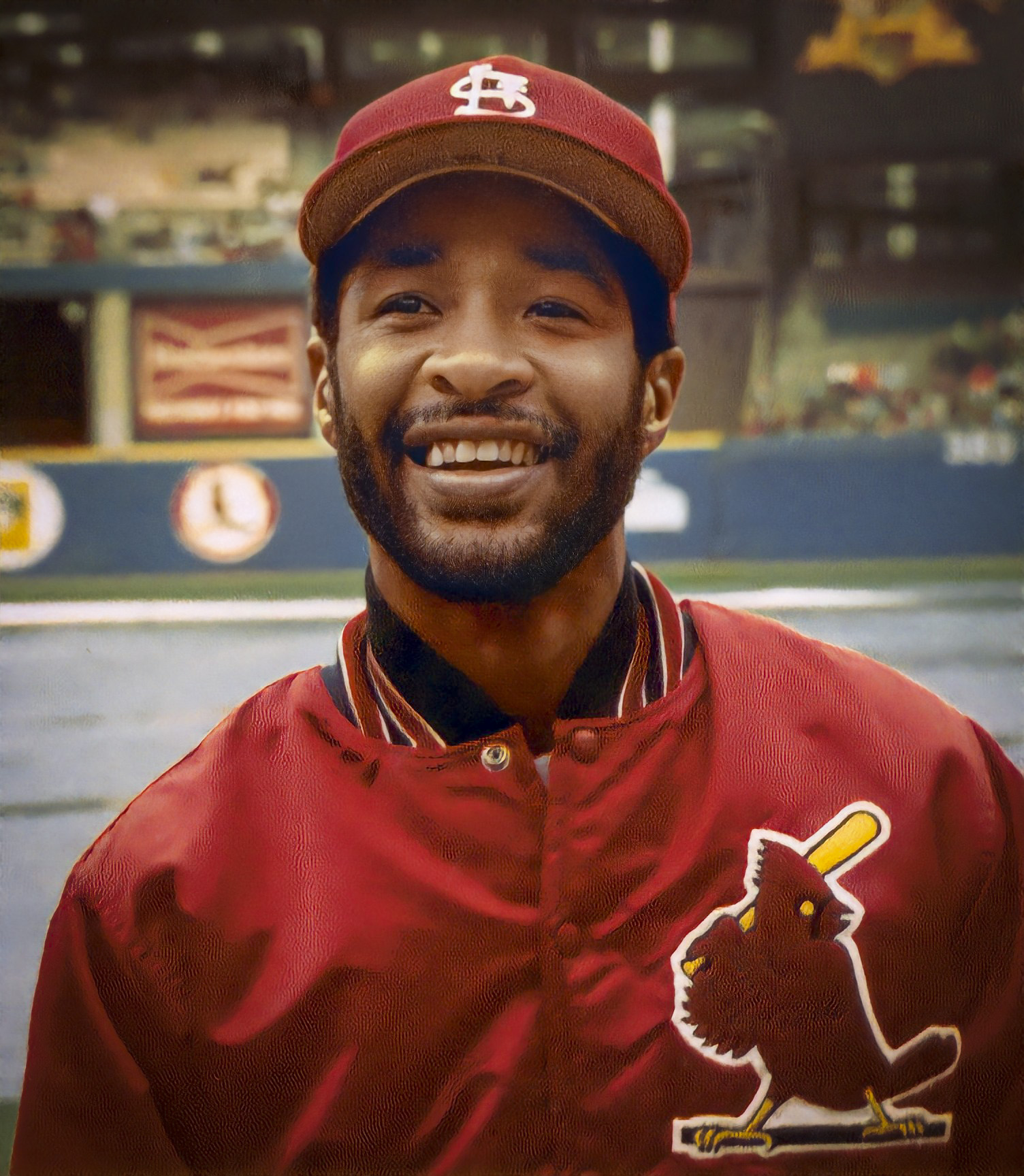
Ozzie Smith in 1983

- December 10 – In a franchise-transforming trade that will take ten weeks to complete, Ozzie Smith, "perhaps the best defensive shortstop ever," is acquired by the St. Louis Cardinals in a six-player transaction with the San Diego Padres. All-Star Smith, known as "The Wizard of Oz", is embroiled in a contract dispute with San Diego owner Ray Kroc. He's won two straight Gold Glove Awards but has batted only .231 in four seasons and 583 games. Cardinals manager and front-office boss Whitey Herzog and Padre GM "Trader Jack" McKeon today announce that the Redbirds have obtained Smith, pitcher Steve Mura and a PTBNL (pitcher Al Olmsted) for the Cardinals' starting shortstop, Garry Templeton, himself a former All-Star, outfielder Sixto Lezcano and a PTBNL (pitcher Luis DeLeón). But the deal will not be final until February 19, 1982, when the Cardinals and Smith resolve his no-trade provisions and contract issues. Smith will play 15 seasons in St. Louis, win a 1982 World Series ring and two other National League pennants, 11 straight Gold Gloves—and a Silver Slugger Award as he flourishes offensively as a Cardinal. He'll be selected to 14 more NL All-Star teams. Smith's uniform #1 will be retired along with him in 1996, and he'll be elected to the Hall of Fame in 2002, his first year of eligibility.
- December 11:
  - The Cincinnati Reds trade pitcher Scott Brown to the Kansas City Royals for outfielder and former top prospect Clint Hurdle.
  - The Royals also acquire outfielder Jerry Martin from the San Francisco Giants for pitchers Rich Gale and Bill Laskey.
  - The Chicago White Sox pick up 1981 All-Star outfielder Tom Paciorek from the Seattle Mariners for catcher Jim Essian, infielder Todd Cruz and outfielder Rod Allen.
  - The Pittsburgh Pirates trade shortstop Tim Foli to the California Angels for catcher Brian Harper.
  - The New York Mets trade shortstop Frank Taveras to the Montreal Expos for pitcher Steve Ratzer and cash. Coincidentally, Foli and Taveras had previously been traded for each other in April 1979.
  - The Mets obtain former All-Star relief pitcher Jim Kern from the Texas Rangers for pitcher Dan Boitano and second baseman Doug Flynn.
- December 15 – Ron Guidry, granted free agency from the New York Yankees on November 13, returns to the Bombers on a multi-year contract. The southpaw, now 31, will give them 21- and 22-victory seasons in 1983 and 1985, five Gold Glove Awards, and two All-Star team selections over the life of the deal, until it expires after the 1986 campaign.
- December 18 – The Cincinnati Reds trade third baseman Ray Knight to the Houston Astros in exchange for outfielder César Cedeño.
- December 23 – The New York Yankees sign outfielder Dave Collins, granted free agency from the Reds November 13. Collins, 29, led the National League in stolen bases with 79 in 1980.
- December 28 – The Toronto Blue Jays make two deals, sending left-hander Paul Mirabella to the Chicago Cubs for a player to be named later (pitcher Dave Geisel), then acquiring outfielder Hosken Powell from the Minnesota Twins for a PTBNL (first baseman Greg "Boomer" Wells).
- December 29 – Righty Joaquín Andújar returns to the St. Louis Cardinals after being granted free agency November 13. He'll give the Redbirds 20- and 21-win seasons in 1984 and 1985.

== Movies ==
- Don't Look Back: The Story of Leroy 'Satchel' Paige (TV)

== Births ==
=== January ===
- January 2 – Ryan Garko
- January 4 – Jailen Peguero
- January 5 – Andy Cavazos
- January 8:
  - Daniel Davidson
  - Jeff Francis
  - Derek Thompson
- January 13:
  - José Capellán
  - Darrell Rasner
- January 16 – Mitch Stetter
- January 18 – Brandon Fahey
- January 20:
  - John Baker
  - Freddy Guzmán
- January 21 – Wilfredo Ledezma
- January 25 – Andy Machado
- January 26:
  - Juan Lara
  - Josh Sharpless
- January 28 – Doug Waechter

=== February ===
- February 4:
  - Ben Hendrickson
  - Tom Mastny
- February 7 – Seth McClung
- February 12 – Chris Snyder
- February 14 – Brad Halsey
- February 16:
  - Sergio Mitre
  - Jerry Owens
- February 17 – Andrew Brown
- February 18:
  - Alex Ríos
  - Alex Serrano
- February 21:
  - Adam Greenberg
  - Tsuyoshi Wada
- February 24:
  - Rob Bowen
  - Paul McAnulty
- February 28 – Brian Bannister

=== March ===
- March 5 – Francisley Bueno
- March 9 – Clay Rapada
- March 12 – Carlos Muñiz
- March 13 – Mike Avilés
- March 14 – Bobby Jenks
- March 16 – Curtis Granderson
- March 18 – Darren Clarke
- March 19 – José Castillo
- March 23:
  - Anderson García
  - Tony Peña Jr.
- March 24 – Dirk Hayhurst
- March 26 – Josh Wilson
- March 27 – Brian Slocum
- March 28 – Edwar Ramírez

=== April ===
- April 2:
  - Brian Barden
  - Mike McCoy
- April 3 – Ryan Doumit
- April 4 – Casey Daigle
- April 5 – Jorge de la Rosa
- April 8:
  - Brian Burres
  - Matt Ford
- April 9:
  - A. J. Ellis
  - Dennis Sarfate
  - Chris Smith
- April 12 – Hisashi Iwakuma
- April 17 – Ryan Raburn
- April 18 – Brian Buscher
- April 21 – Ronny Paulino
- April 23 – Sean Henn
- April 25 – Sean White
- April 27 – Joey Gathright
- April 28:
  - Yoslan Herrera
  - Shawn Hill
  - Chad Santos
- April 29 – Omir Santos

=== May ===
- May 1 – Manny Acosta
- May 5 – Chris Duncan
- May 6 – Dustin Nippert
- May 8:
  - John Maine
  - Alfredo Simón
- May 9 – Bill Murphy
- May 11 – Daniel Ortmeier
- May 15 – Justin Morneau
- May 20 – Kensuke Tanaka
- May 21 – Josh Hamilton
- May 24 – Penny Taylor
- May 26 – Ben Zobrist
- May 28:
  - Daniel Cabrera
  - Leo Rosales
- May 30 – Reggie Willits
- May 31:
  - Jake Peavy
  - Ray Olmedo

=== June ===
- June 1 – Carlos Zambrano
- June 2:
  - Jared Burton
  - Chin-hui Tsao
- June 3:
  - Rich Rundles
  - Munenori Kawasaki
- June 6 – Eddie Bonine
- June 7 – Tyler Johnson
- June 8 – Kevin Mahar
- June 9 – Drew Anderson
- June 11 – Jason Waddell
- June 15 – Jeremy Reed
- June 16 – Joe Saunders
- June 18 – Ben Johnson
- June 19 – Val Majewski
- June 21:
  - Jeff Baker
  - Garrett Jones
- June 28 – Brandon Phillips

=== July ===
- July 1 – Matt Carson
- July 2 – Ángel Pagán
- July 3 – Dan Meyer
- July 4 – Francisco Cruceta
- July 5 – Jesse Crain
- July 7 – Jon Huber
- July 9 – Tommy Hottovy
- July 11 – Blaine Boyer
- July 12:
  - Phil Dumatrait
  - Sam Narron
- July 19 – Jimmy Gobble
- July 22 – Ángel Chávez
- July 23 – Hong-Chih Kuo
- July 25 – Kevin Kouzmanoff

=== August ===
- August 3:
  - Travis Bowyer
  - Félix Sánchez
- August 5:
  - Carl Crawford
  - Tripp Gibson
- August 8 – Eddy Rodríguez
- August 10 – Fernando Cortez
- August 13:
  - Cory Doyne
  - Randy Messenger
- August 14 – Chris Sáenz
- August 15 – Óliver Pérez
- August 18 – Pat Misch
- August 24 – Omar Beltré
- August 28 – Yuniesky Maya
- August 29 – Drew Meyer
- August 30 – Adam Wainwright
- August 31:
  - Dennis Dove
  - Ramón Ramírez

=== September ===
- September 3 – Jake Woods
- September 6 – Mark Teahen
- September 10:
  - Kameron Loe
  - Connor Robertson
- September 12 – Franquelis Osoria
- September 13 – Justin James
- September 14 – Cody Clark
- September 17 – Casey Janssen
- September 19 – Scott Baker
- September 20 – Jordan Tata
- September 21:
  - Scott Rice
  - Billy Sadler
- September 22 – Alexei Ramírez
- September 25:
  - Rocco Baldelli
  - Jason Bergmann
- September 27 – Mike Esposito
- September 30 – Brandon Watson

=== October ===
- October 2 – Marino Salas
- October 3 – Matt Murton
- October 4 – Joe Thatcher
- October 6 – Joel Hanrahan
- October 11 – David Rackley
- October 13 – Taylor Buchholz
- October 14 – Boof Bonser
- October 16 – Anthony Reyes
- October 17:
  - Brett Campbell
  - Edwin Maysonet
- October 18 – David Murphy
- October 23 – Ben Francisco
- October 24:
  - Beltrán Pérez
  - Omar Quintanilla
- October 28 – Nate McLouth
- October 30 – Ian Snell
- October 31:
  - Mike Napoli
  - Jared Wells

=== November ===
- November 2 – Wilson Betemit
- November 4 – Erick Threets
- November 5 – Jarrett Grube
- November 7 – Dave Krynzel
- November 9 – Chuck James
- November 10:
  - Tony Blanco
  - Merkin Valdez
- November 16 – Fernando Cabrera
- November 19 – Jeff Gray
- November 20 – Sam Fuld
- November 21 – Enrique Cruz
- November 22 – Óscar Villarreal
- November 23 – P. J. Pilittere
- November 29 – Guillermo Quiróz
- November 30 – Rich Harden

=== December ===
- December 3 – Chris Snelling
- December 4 – Jerome Williams
- December 8:
  - Cory Blaser
  - Kory Casto
- December 10 – Víctor Díaz
- December 12 – Shane Costa
- December 14:
  - Ángel Guzmán
  - Shaun Marcum
- December 15:
  - Andy González
  - Lou Montañez
- December 18 – Jeremy Accardo
- December 20:
  - Chris Narveson
  - James Shields
- December 23 – Jordan Baker
- December 25 – Willy Taveras
- December 26:
  - Alvin Colina
  - Dustin Moseley
  - Omar Infante
- December 27 – David Aardsma

== Deaths ==
=== January ===
- January 3 – Lou Fette, 73, All-Star (1939) pitcher who posted a 41–40 record with a 3.15 ERA in 109 games for the Boston Bees/Braves and Brooklyn Dodgers; went 20–10 as a 30-year-old rookie for 1937 Bees; led the National League in shutouts in 1937 and 1939.
- January 6 – Fred Stiely, 79, pitcher who toiled in nine games for parts of the 1929 through 1931 seasons for the St. Louis Browns of the American League.
- January 7 – Irv Stein, 69, pitcher for the 1932 Philadelphia Athletics of the American League.
- January 17 – Owen Kahn, 75, pinch-hitter in one game for the 1930 Boston Braves.
- January 26 – Ray Oyler, 43, weak-hitting shortstop known for his excellent glovework with the Detroit Tigers' 1968 champions, afterwards taken in the expansion draft by the Seattle Pilots.
- January 27:
  - Spencer Davis, 72, infielder who played in the Negro leagues between 1938 and 1942.
  - Huck Geary, 64, shortstop for the Pittsburgh Pirates from 1942 to 1943.
- January 30 – Marino Pieretti, 60, Italian-born pitcher who posted a 30–38 record with a 4.53 ERA for the Washington Senators, Chicago White Sox and Cleveland Indians from 1945 to 1950.
- January 31 – John Dowd, 90, New York Highlanders shortstop who appeared in ten games in 1912.

=== February ===
- February 2 – Al Van Camp, 77, first baseman/left fielder who played from 1928 to 1932 for the Cleveland Indians and Boston Red Sox.
- February 4 – Grant Gillis, 70, utility infielder for the Washington Senators and Boston Red Sox between 1927 and 1929.
- February 5 – Jake Stephens, 80, shortstop and All-Star who played in the Negro leagues between 1923 and 1937; member of 1925 champion Hilldale Club.
- February 6 – Cactus Keck, 82, pitcher for the Cincinnati Reds from 1922 to 1923.
- February 7 – Clarence Eldridge, 92, lawyer and advertising executive who was a substitute umpire during the 1914 and 1915 American League seasons.
- February 9 – Henry McHenry, 70, two-time All-Star pitcher as a member of the Philadelphia Stars between 1938 and 1948; over a four-season span, led Negro National League in victories (1938), complete games (1938, 1941), strikeouts (1939) and games lost (1940).
- February 12 – Frank Genovese, 66, minor league outfielder and longtime scout and minor-league manager for New York/San Francisco Giants who taught Willie Mays his distinctive "basket catch".
- February 13 – George Britt, 76, played every position (primarily a pitcher and catcher) over a Negro leagues and Black baseball career that stretched from 1917 to 1944.
- February 15 – Cotton Pippen, 69, pitcher for the St. Louis Cardinals, Philadelphia Athletics and Detroit Tigers from 1936 to 1940, better known as the pitcher that struck out Ted Williams in his first major league at-bat.
- February 19 – Sam Barnes, 81, second baseman for the Detroit Tigers in the 1921 season.
- February 22 – Andy High, 83, National League third baseman who hit .284 in 1,314 games for five different teams (1922–1934), and a member of the St. Louis Cardinals 1931 World Series champions; longtime scout and scouting director for Brooklyn/Los Angeles Dodgers; brother of Hugh and Charlie High.
- February 23 – Myrl Brown, 86, pitcher who posted a 3–1 record in seven games for the 1922 Pittsburgh Pirates.
- February 25 – Frank McCrea, 84, catcher who played but one MLB game, on September 26, 1925, for the Cleveland Indians.
- February 27 – Pepper Bassett, 70, catcher and six-time All-Star who played in the Negro leagues between 1935 and 1948, notably for the Birmingham Black Barons, Chicago American Giants and Pittsburgh Crawfords.

=== March ===
- March 6 – Wade Lefler, 84, backup outfielder who played for the Boston Braves and Washington Senators during the 1924 season.
- March 7 – Pee-Wee Wanninger, 78, backup shortstop for the New York Yankees, Boston Red Sox and Cincinnati Reds, better known as the player who replaced Everett Scott with the Yankees in 1925 to end his then-major league record of 1,307 consecutive games.
- March 8 – Gowell Claset, 73, pitcher for the 1933 Philadelphia Athletics of the American League.
- March 10 – Bob Elson, 76, legendary broadcaster for the Chicago White Sox from 1931 to 1970, who also worked for the Chicago Cubs and Oakland Athletics; winner of the 1979 Ford C. Frick Award.
- March 11 – Vince Gonzales, 55, Cuban-born Mexican pitcher who played with the Washington Senators in 1955.
- March 17:
  - Paul Dean, 68, pitcher who joined his older brother Dizzy on the St. Louis Cardinals, winning 19 games in each of his first two seasons – the brothers each won two games in the 1934 World Series.
  - Joe Giebel, 89, catcher who played in one game for the 1913 World Series champion Philadelphia Athletics on September 30, the closing day of the American League season.
- March 18 – Al Pinkston, 63, outfielder who briefly appeared for 1948 Cleveland Buckeyes of the Negro American League, then turned in a brilliant career in integrated minor league baseball—especially in the Class A SALLY League and Western League and Double-A Mexican League—from the ages of 33 to 47; at 42, batted .397 (1.078 OPS) for the Diablos Rojos del México in 1960, then at 44 he hit .381 (0.984) for El Águila de Veracruz in 1962; won six battling titles between 1952 and 1962 and batted .352 lifetime in the minors; member of the Mexican Professional Baseball Hall of Fame.
- March 19:
  - Zinn Beck, 95, backup infielder who played for the St. Louis Cardinals and New York Yankees, hitting .226 in 124 games between 1913 and 1918; longtime scout for Washington Senators/Minnesota Twins.
  - Frank Lane, 86, nicknamed "Frantic Frank" and "Trader Lane", general manager of the Chicago White Sox (1948–1955), St. Louis Cardinals (1955–1957), Cleveland Indians (1957–1960), Kansas City Athletics (1961) and Milwaukee Brewers (1971–1972) known for constantly churning his rosters through trades.
- March 20:
  - Charles Beverly, 80, southpaw who pitched for five Negro leagues clubs between 1925 and 1939; led Negro National League in games lost (12) in 1925.
  - Gee Walker, 73, All-Star outfielder who played from 1931 through 1945 for the Detroit Tigers, Chicago White Sox, Washington Senators, Cleveland Indians and Cincinnati Reds, collecting a career batting average of .294, 1,991 hits, 223 stolen bases, and 124 home runs.
- March 21 – Lamar Potter, 71, pitcher, second baseman and outfielder who played for the 1932 Atlanta Black Crackers of the Negro Southern League.
- March 24 – Charlie Hughes, 74, second baseman/shortstop who appeared for six Negro National League teams in only three seasons (1933–1934, 1938)
- March 25 – Red Morgan, 97, third baseman for the 1906 Boston Americans, at the time of his death the oldest living former major leaguer.
- March 28 – Don Pelham, 72, outfielder and player-manager for the Atlanta Black Crackers of the Negro American League in 1938.
- March 30 – Cornelius Augustus, 75, southpaw who hurled for the Memphis Red Sox (1927) of the Negro National League, then the St. Louis Stars (1937) of the Negro American League.

=== April ===
- April 2 – Ben Rochefort, 84, first baseman who appeared in two games with the Philadelphia Athletics in 1914.
- April 3 – Clayton Lambert, 64, Cincinnati Reds pitcher in the 1946 and 1947 seasons.
- April 6:
  - Steve Mesner, 63, third baseman for the Cubs, Cardinals and Reds in parts of six seasons, who led the National League for the most assists in 1945.
  - Dick Seay, 76, three-time All-Star and second baseman/shortstop whose Negro leagues career spanned 1926 to 1947.
- April 12 – Dick Hoover, 55, relief pitcher for the 1952 Boston Braves of the National League.
- April 16 – Effa Manley, 84, owner of the Negro leagues' Newark Eagles from 1935 to 1948.
- April 27 – Emerson Dickman, 66, pitcher for the Boston Red Sox between 1936 and 1941, who later became a coach at Princeton University in the 1950s.

=== May ===
- May 8:
  - Earle Brucker Sr., 80, backup catcher who broke into majors at advanced age of 36 and played 241 games over five seasons (1937–1940 and 1943) for Philadelphia Athletics, batting .290; coached for Athletics (1941–1949), St. Louis Browns (1950) and Cincinnati Reds (1952), serving as acting manager of Reds that year for five games (July 30 to August 3), going 3–2; his son and namesake, also a catcher, had brief 1948 trial with Athletics.
  - Eddie Onslow, 88, first baseman who played 64 total games for the 1912–1913 Detroit Tigers, 1918 Cleveland Indians and 1927 Washington Senators, later a scout; spent two decades as a player or player-manager in the minor leagues, and elected to International League Hall of Fame in 1951; brother Jack had long MLB career as a catcher, coach, scout and manager.
- May 11 – Sammy Byrd, 73, outfielder, pinch hitter and pinch runner who got into 745 career games for the New York Yankees (1929–1934) and Cincinnati Reds (1935–1936).
- May 16:
  - Jim Finigan, 52, two-time All-Star second baseman and third baseman who played from 1954 to 1959 for the Philadelphia/Kansas City Athletics, Detroit Tigers, San Francisco Giants and Baltimore Orioles.
  - Tommy Mee, 91, infielder in eight games for the 1910 St. Louis Browns.
- May 22:
  - Bill Bayne, 82, southpaw pitcher who appeared in 199 MLB games for the 1919–1925 St. Louis Browns, 1928 Cleveland Indians and 1929–1930 Boston Red Sox.
  - Pen Gilliard, 77, who played in the Negro American League in 1937 and 1938, primarily as an outfielder.
- May 23 – Gene Green, 47, outfielder/catcher who played in 408 games from 1957 to 1963 for the St. Louis Cardinals, Baltimore Orioles, expansion Washington Senators, Cleveland Indians and Cincinnati Reds.
- May 24 – Don Richmond, 61, third baseman who appeared in 56 career games for Philadelphia Athletics (1941 and 1946–1947) and St. Louis Cardinals (1951); minor-league star and member of International League Hall of Fame.
- May 26:
  - Bartolo Portuondo, 87, Havana native and third baseman for the 1920–1922 Kansas City Monarchs of the Negro National League and the 1923–1928 Cuban Stars East of the Eastern Colored League.
  - George Smith, 79, pitcher who played from 1926 to 1930 for the Detroit Tigers and Boston Red Sox.
- May 31:
  - Elmer Leonard, 92, a 6 ft 3 in (1.91 m) pitcher (nicknamed "Tiny") who went 2–2 (2.84) in five games for the eventual 1913 world-champion Philadelphia Athletics between June 22 and July 27.
  - Mike Smith, 76, outfielder/pinch hitter who got into four games for the New York Giants in September 1926.

=== June ===
- June 2 – Skinny O'Neal, 82, pitcher who worked in 13 total MLB games for the Philadelphia Phillies (1925, 1927).
- June 18 – Honey Barnes, 81, catcher who appeared in only one major-league game, on April 20, 1926, for the New York Yankees; played two innings in the field and drew a base on balls in his lone plate appearance.
- June 27 – Sam McConnell, 86, third baseman who appeared in six games for the last-place 1915 Philadelphia Athletics.

=== July ===
- July 1 – Dan Daniel, 91, sportswriter for The Sporting News and various New York newspapers for over 50 years; also a member of baseball's Rules Committee.
- July 3 – George Knothe, 83, second baseman in six games for 1932 Philadelphia Phillies; his brother was also a National League infielder.
- July 5 – Horace "Pug" Allen, 82, outfielder who briefly appeared for 1919 Brooklyn Robins; Georgia Tech graduate who became a college football coach at Stetson University of DeLand, Florida.
- July 7 – Merl Combs, 61, shortstop for the Boston Red Sox, Washington Senators and Cleveland Indians between 1947 and 1952; later an MLB scout and coach.
- July 8:
  - Bradford Bennett, 64, Tuskegee Institute graduate and outfielder for the St. Louis/New Orleans Stars and New York Black Yankees of the Negro leagues between 1940 and 1942.
  - "Wild Bill" Hallahan, 78, southpaw hurler and three-time World Series champion (1926, 1931, 1934) for the St. Louis Cardinals; went 2–0 with two complete-game wins and a save in three appearances during the 1931 Fall Classic, helping the Cards dethrone the favored Philadelphia Athletics; also pitched for the Cincinnati Reds and Philadelphia Phillies in a 12-season career spanning 1925 to 1938.
- July 10 – Henry Richardson, 63, pitcher who appeared for the Washington Black Senators and Pittsburgh Crawfords of the Negro National League in 1938.
- July 18 – Babe Davis, 72, outfielder/second baseman who played for the Atlanta Black Crackers, Indianapolis ABCs, Homestead Grays and Memphis Red Sox of the Negro leagues between 1937 and 1940.
- July 21 – Jim McGarr, 92, one of the "replacement players" called into service for one game, on May 18, 1912, when the Detroit Tigers went on strike to protest the suspension of Ty Cobb; he played second base and fanned four times as the Tigers fell to the Philadelphia Athletics, 24–2, at Shibe Park.

=== August ===
- August 2 – Dorothy Maguire, 62, All-Star catcher and member of two championship teams in the All-American Girls Professional Baseball League.
- August 3 – Jim McLeod, 72, third baseman and shortstop who appeared in 92 games for the Washington Senators (1930, 1932) and Philadelphia Phillies (1933).
- August 9 – Sammy T. Hughes, 70, six-time All-Star second baseman of the Negro leagues, mainly with the Elite Giants.
- August 11 – Walt Huntzinger, 82, pitcher who appeared in 60 games between 1923 and 1926 for the New York Giants, St. Louis Cardinals and Chicago Cubs.
- August 12 – George Lyons, 90, pitched in a total of 33 games with the St. Louis Cardinals and the St. Louis Browns in the 1920s.
- August 31 – Roy Parmelee, 74, pitcher who went 59–55 (4.27) in 206 career games with New York Giants (1929–1935), St. Louis Cardinals (1936), Chicago Cubs (1937) and Philadelphia Athletics (1939).

=== September ===
- September 2 – George Lowe, 86, relief pitcher for the 1920 Cincinnati Reds.
- September 6 – Eddie Ainsmith, 91, Russian-born catcher who appeared in 1,078 games over 15 seasons (1910–1924) for five clubs, principally the Washington Senators, St. Louis Cardinals and Detroit Tigers.
- September 9:
  - Willie Haynes, 80, pitcher and outfielder who appeared in the Negro leagues between 1920 and 1932.
  - Johnny Stevens, 69, American League umpire whose 26-year (1948–1971, 1973, 1975) tenure included 3,345 league games, four World Series, and five All-Star games.
- September 15 – Earl Caldwell, 76, pitcher who played professionally for 29 consecutive seasons (1926–1954), including 200 games pitched for Philadelphia Phillies (1928), St. Louis Browns (1935–1937), Chicago White Sox (1945–1948) and Boston Red Sox (1948).
- September 13 – León Kellman, 54, legendary Panamanian catcher/manager who led his teams to three championships; also a four-time Negro league All-Star, as well as the first player in Mexican baseball history to hit two grand slams in the same game.
- September 20 – Harry Fisher, 55, Canadian pitcher and pinch hitter who appeared in 16 games for the 1951–1952 Pirates, eight of them on the mound.
- September 21 – Al Bool, 84, catcher who played in 129 total games over three one-year trials with the 1928 Washington Senators, 1930 Pittsburgh Pirates and 1931 Boston Braves.

=== October ===
- October 4 – Freddie Lindstrom, 75, Hall of Fame third baseman for the New York Giants who batted .311 lifetime, twice collecting 230 hits and batting .333 in the 1924 World Series at age 18; later coach at Northwestern.
- October 8 – Bill Nagel, 66, infielder who played in 189 games during the 1939, 1941 and 1945 seasons for the Philadelphia Athletics, Philadelphia Phillies and Chicago White Sox.
- October 12 – Art Passarella, 71, American League umpire from 1941 to 1953; worked in three World Series and two All-Star games.
- October 13:
  - Percy Bailey, 76, All-Star pitcher for Indianapolis/Detroit, Nashville and Chicago of the Negro National League in 1933–1934; Alcorn State University alumnus who also served as a longtime educator in Black schools in Hattiesburg, Mississippi, area during and after his baseball career.
  - Jack Knott, 74, pitcher who appeared in 325 games for the St. Louis Browns, Chicago White Sox and Philadelphia Athletics over 11 seasons (1933–1942 and 1946).
- October 17 – Johnny Peacock, 71, catcher for the Boston Red Sox, Philadelphia Phillies and Brooklyn Dodgers, between 1937 and 1945.
- October 18 – Lou Ciola, 59, pitcher in 12 games for the wartime 1943 Philadelphia Athletics.
- October 21:
  - Gene Robertson, 81, lefty-swinging third baseman who played in 656 MLB games over nine seasons between 1919 and 1930, mostly for the St. Louis Browns; member of 1928 World Series champion New York Yankees.
  - Hubert Wilson, 79, pitcher who posted an 8–2 (3.21 ERA) record for the 1928–1929 Kansas City Monarchs of the Negro National League.
- October 22 – Taffy Wright, 70, outfielder for the Washington Senators, Chicago White Sox and Philadelphia Athletics from 1938 to 1942 and 1946–1949; batted .311 with 1,115 hits in 1,029 career MLB games.
- October 25 – Pete Reiser, 62, three-time All-Star center fielder for the Brooklyn Dodgers (1940–1942 and 1946–1948) who led the National League in batting and four other categories in 1941 and in steals twice, but whose fearless defensive style led to numerous injuries and a decline in performance; also played for Boston Braves, Pittsburgh Pirates and Cleveland Indians from 1949 to 1952; later a coach for the Los Angeles Dodgers, Chicago Cubs and California Angels during the 1960s and 1970s.
- October 26 – Harry Hoch, 94, pitcher who went 2–7 (4.35 ERA) in 30 games for the 1908 Philadelphia Phillies and 1914–1915 St. Louis Browns.
- October 31 – Fred Archer, 71, left-handed pitcher who made seven appearances for 1936–1937 Philadelphia Athletics.

=== November ===
- November 2 – Hugh East, 62, pitcher for the New York Giants in a span of three seasons from 1941 to 1943; later a longtime scout.
- November 3:
  - Al Jurisich, 60, pitcher in 104 career games for 1944–1945 St. Louis Cardinals and 1946–1947 Philadelphia Phillies; member of the 1944 Cardinals World Series champions.
  - Theolic Smith, 68, pitcher and occasional outfielder who played in the Negro leagues, the independent Mexican League, and the Pacific Coast League between 1936 and 1955.
- November 10 – Ed Lagger, 69, pitcher who appeared in eight games for the 1934 Philadelphia Athletics.
- November 12 – Eddie Klep, 63, left-handed pitcher said to be the first Caucasian to play in the Negro leagues when, on May 29, 1946, he appeared for the Cleveland Buckeyes in a Negro American League game; Baseball Reference contains no statistics under Klep's playing entry.
- November 13 – Alex Radcliff, 76, thirteen-time All-Star third baseman and Negro leagues standout whose career spanned 1926 to 1946, primarily as a member of the Chicago American Giants; hit .369 to win 1943 Negro American League batting title.
- November 15 – Steve Macko, 27, middle infielder and third baseman who played for the Chicago Cubs in the 1979 and 1980 seasons.
- November 17 – Red Shea, 82, pitcher for the Philadelphia Athletics and New York Giants in parts of three seasons spanning 1918–1922.
- November 25 – Eddie Berry, 63, pitcher for the 1943 Baltimore Elite Giants of the Negro National League.
- November 27 – Frank Betcher, 93, backup infielder in 35 games for the 1910 St. Louis Cardinals.

=== December ===
- December 1 – Tony Piet, 74, second baseman and third baseman who played in 744 games over eight seasons (1931–1938) for the Pittsburgh Pirates, Cincinnati Reds, Chicago White Sox and Detroit Tigers.
- December 2 – Nat Rogers, 88, outfielder whose 20-year tenure in the Negro leagues spanned 1923 to 1945 playing for the Memphis Red Sox, Chicago American Giants, Birmingham Black Barons, Harrisburg Giants and Brooklyn Royal Giants; member of 1927 Negro World Series champion Chicago squad.
- December 3 – Walter Cannady, 79, infielder whose career in Black baseball extended from 1921 to 1945; selected All-Star third baseman in 1938 while playing for the New York Black Yankees of the Negro National League.
- December 4 – Stan Hollmig, 55, outfielder and pinch hitter for the 1949–1951 Philadelphia Phillies, appearing in 94 games in all; later, a scout.
- December 7 – Juan Padrón, 89, left-handed pitcher whose career in Black baseball, the Negro leagues and Cuban Winter League extended from 1915 to 1926; led Negro National League in shutouts twice (1922, 1924) while hurling for the Chicago American Giants.
- December 8 – Bill Windle, 76, first baseman who appeared in three total games for the 1928–1929 Pittsburgh Pirates.
- December 9 – Ernie Alten, 86, southpaw who pitched in 14 games for the 1920 Detroit Tigers.
- December 10:
  - Bob Joyce, 66, pitcher who appeared in 43 total MLB games for the 1939 Philadelphia Athletics and 1946 New York Giants; star hurler in Pacific Coast League during World War II era, winning over 20 games for four straight years (1942–1945), including posting a 31–11 (2.17) record for the 1945 San Francisco Seals.
  - John F. Kieran, 89, New York sportswriter and radio and television personality who authored books on numerous subjects.
  - Freddy Leach, 84, outfielder who batted .307 with 1,147 hits over ten seasons (1923–1932) with the Philadelphia Phillies, New York Giants and Boston Braves.
- December 13 – Jack Snyder, 95, catcher who appeared in seven games for 1917 Brooklyn Robins.
- December 15:
  - Tom Glass, 83, relief pitcher who worked in two games for the Philadelphia Athletics in June 1925, but won his only decision.
  - Jack Wisner, 82, pitcher who hurled in 51 games for 1919–1920 Pittsburgh Pirates and 1925–1926 New York Giants.
- December 18 – Jake Brown, 33, outfielder and pinch hitter who appeared in 41 games for the 1975 San Francisco Giants.
- December 20 – Bob Stewart, 66, American League umpire from 1958 to 1970 who worked in 1,958 regular season games, two All-Star matches, and three World Series, including during his final season.
- December 22 – Ed Gallagher, 71, pitcher for the 1932 Boston Red Sox.
- December 23 – George Scharein, 67, shortstop and second baseman who appeared in 388 games for the 1937–1940 Philadelphia Phillies; brother of Art Scharein.
- December 24 – Joe Kracher, 68, catcher who got into five games for the Phillies in September 1939.
- December 28 – John Bischoff, 87, catcher for the Chicago White Sox and Boston Red Sox in the 1920s, and one of the first foreign ballplayers to play in Cuban baseball.
- December 29 – Don Plarski, 52, center-fielder who played in eight games for 1955 Kansas City Athletics.
- December 30 – Josh Billings, 90, backup catcher in all or parts of 11 American League seasons with Cleveland (1913–1918) and St. Louis (1919–1923).
