= Hubert Wilson =

Hubert Wilson may refer to:

- Hubert Wilson, explorer, see George Fleming
- Hubert Wilson (baseball) (1902–1981), American baseball player
- Hub Wilson (James Hubert Wilson, 1909–1999), ice hockey player
- Hubert Wilson (politician), see Longford–Westmeath

== See also ==
- Bert Wilson (disambiguation)
