= Herbert Wilson (disambiguation) =

Herbert Wilson (1929–2008) was a British physicist.

Herbert Wilson may also refer to:

- Herbert Wilson (Sussex cricketer) (1881–1937), English cricketer
- Herbert Wilson (Nottinghamshire cricketer) (1892–1972), English cricketer
- Herbert Wilson (footballer) (1893–1956), Australian rules footballer
- Herbert Charles Wilson (1859–1909), Canadian politician
- Herbert Wrigley Wilson (1866–1940), British journalist and naval historian
- Herbert Haydon Wilson (1875–1917), British polo player
- Herbert Ward Wilson (1877–1955), Australian naturalist
- Herbert A. Wilson (1870–1934), American politician in Massachusetts

== See also ==
- Bert Wilson (disambiguation)
