= Albert Wilson =

Albert Wilson may refer to:

- Al Wilson (pilot) (Albert Pete Wilson, 1895–1932), American film actor, producer and stunt pilot
- Albert Wilson (American football) (born 1992), American football player
- Albert Wilson (botanist) (1902–1996), American botanist and gardener
- Albert Wilson (footballer) (1915–1998), English footballer
- Albert Wilson (politician) (1878–?), Australian politician
- Albert E. Wilson (c. 1813–1861), American pioneer and merchant in Oregon Country
- Albert George Wilson (1918–2012), American astronomer who worked at Palomar Observatory

== See also ==
- Al Wilson (disambiguation)
- Bert Wilson (disambiguation)
