= List of people from Ottawa, Illinois =

The following list includes notable people who were born or have lived in Ottawa, Illinois. For a similar list organized alphabetically by last name, see the category page People from Ottawa, Illinois.

== Academics and scientists ==
Name	Image	Birth	Death	Known for	Association	Reference
Stephen L. Brusatte		Apr 24, 1984		Paleontologist	Born in Ottawa & graduated from local high school	
Tom Flanagan		Mar 5, 1944		Political scientist	Born in Ottawa	

== Arts and culture ==
Name	Image	Birth	Death	Known for	Association	Reference
Scotty Bowers		Jul 1, 1923	Oct 13, 2019	Author, sex worker	Born and raised in Ottawa	
Keith Clark				Conductor and founder of the Pacific Symphony	Raised in Ottawa	
Santiago Durango		1957		Musician		
Kim Howard Johnson		Aug 6, 1955		Author of Monty Python books	Born in Ottawa	
Maria Kanellis		Feb 25, 1982		WWE wrestler, actress	Born in Ottawa	
George R. Lawrence		Feb 24, 1868	Dec 15, 1938	Photographer	Born in Ottawa	
Russell Lee		Jul 21, 1903	Aug 28, 1986	Photographer	Born in Ottawa	
Terrence Malick		Nov 30, 1943		Film writer and director	Born in Ottawa	
Johnston McCulley		Feb 2, 1883	Nov 23, 1958	Author of short stories, novels, and screenplays, creator of Zorro	Born in Ottawa	
Bob McGrath		Jun 13, 1932	Dec 4, 2022	Actor (Sesame Street)	Born in Ottawa	
Brad Miller		1981		Chef and TV personality	Born in Ottawa	
Walt Willey		Jan 26, 1951		Actor (All My Children)	Born in Ottawa	
Alexander Wilson		May 25, 1953	Oct 26, 1993	Writer and activist	Born in Ottawa	
Mary Lee Wooters		Oct 24, 1924	Jun 6, 1996	Big band singer, film actress	Born in Centralia, Illinois, raised in Ottawa	

== Crime ==
Name	Image	Birth	Death	Known for	Association	Reference
John Patrick Looney		1865	1947	Gangster, basis for character in Road to Perdition	Born in Ottawa	

== Military ==
Name	Image	Birth	Death	Known for	Association	Reference
George H. Cameron		Jan 8, 1861	Jan 28, 1944	World War I commander of 4th Infantry Division and V Corps	Born in Ottawa	
Theophilus Lyle Dickey		Oct 12, 1811	Jul 22, 1885	Federal judge and Mexican–American War cavalry officer	Resided in Ottawa	
Frederic Dahl Evans		Jun 29, 1866	May 1, 1953	World War I brigadier general	Born in Ottawa	
Reed G. Landis		Jul 17, 1896	May 30, 1975	World War I ace and national commander of the American Legion	Born in Ottawa	
Arthur L. Wagner		Mar 16, 1853	Jun 17, 1905	US Army brigadier general; born in Ottawa	Born in Ottawa	
W. H. L. Wallace		Jul 8, 1821	Apr 10, 1862	Union Army brigadier general in the US Civil War	Practiced law in Ottawa	

== Medicine and academia ==
Name	Image	Birth	Death	Known for	Association	Reference
Cornelia Chase Brant		Dec 16, 1863	Mar 9, 1959	Quaker woman who began a medical career as a mature student; dean of New York Medical College and Hospital for Women	Born in Ottawa	

== Politics and law ==
Name	Image	Birth	Death	Known for	Association	Reference
William D. Boyce		Jun 16, 1858	Jun 11, 1929	Founder of the Boy Scouts of America		
John Edward Cassidy		Jan 31, 1896	Mar 25, 1984	Illinois attorney general 1938-41	Born in Ottawa	
Tom Corcoran		May 23, 1939		US congressman	Born in Ottawa	
William Cullen		Mar 4, 1826	Jan 17, 1914	US congressman		
Harry Kelly		Apr 19, 1895	Feb 8, 1971	39th governor of Michigan	Born in Ottawa	
Maurice T. Moloney		Jul 26, 1849	Mar 9, 1917	Attorney general of Illinois and mayor of Ottawa		
William Reddick		Oct 31, 1812	Mar 8,1885	Businessman, politician, sheriff, philanthropist	Served 47 years in Ottawa	
Charles Edgar Woodward		Dec 1, 1876	May 15, 1942	Federal judge, United States District Court for the Northern District of Illinois		

== Sports ==
=== Baseball ===
Name	Image	Birth	Death	Known for	Association	Reference
Michael Hermosillo		Jan 17, 1995		Outfielder for the Chicago Cubs and Los Angeles Angels	Born in Ottawa	
Guy Hoffman		Jul 9, 1956		Pitcher for the Chicago White Sox, Chicago Cubs, Cincinnati Reds and Texas Rangers	Born in Ottawa	
Charlie Jaeger		Apr 17, 1875	Sep 27, 1942	Pitcher for the Detroit Tigers	Born in Ottawa	
Ed Mickelson		Sep 9, 1926	Jun 27, 2025	First baseman for the St. Louis Cardinals, St. Louis Browns, and Chicago Cubs; born in Ottawa	Born in Ottawa	

=== Football ===
Name	Image	Birth	Death	Known for	Association	Reference
Aaron Shea		Dec 5, 1976		Tight end and fullback for the Cleveland Browns and San Diego Chargers	Born in Ottawa	

=== Golf ===
Name	Image	Birth	Death	Known for	Association	Reference
Tim Finchem		Apr 19, 1947		Golf commissioner	Born in Ottawa	
