= Alexander Wilson =

Alexander or Alex Wilson may refer to:

== Literature ==
- Alexander Wilson (English writer) (1893–1963), MI6 officer and writer of a series of spy novels
- L. Alex Wilson (1909–1960), African-American journalist
- Alexander Wilson (Canadian writer) (1953–1993), American-born Canadian writer, landscape designer, and community activist

== Military ==
- Alexander Wilson (Royal Navy officer) (1760–1834), Royal Navy rear-admiral
- Sir Alexander Wilson (British Army officer) (1858–1937), British Army major-general and lieutenant-governor of Jersey
- Sir James Wilson (British Army officer) (Alexander James Wilson, 1921–2004), British Army lieutenant-general

== Politics ==
- Alexander Wilson (Virginia politician), United States representative from Virginia, 1803–1809
- Alexander Wilson (Wisconsin politician) (1833–1888), attorney general of Wisconsin, 1878–1882
- Alexander Wilson (New South Wales politician) (1849–1927), member of the New South Wales Legislative Assembly
- Alexander Wilson (Australian politician) (1889–1954), member of the Australian House of Representatives
- Alexander Wilson (Scottish politician) (1917–1978), Labour member of parliament for Hamilton
- Alex Wilson (Australian politician) (1920–2004), member of the Queensland Legislative Assembly
- Alex Wilson (British politician), member of the London Assembly

== Sports ==
- Alexander Cracroft Wilson (1840–1911), New Zealand cricketer
- Alex Wilson (rugby union) (1874–1932), New Zealand rugby union player
- Alex Wilson (Canadian sprinter) (1907–1994)
- Alex Wilson (footballer, born 1908) (1908–1971), Scottish football goalkeeper
- Alex Wilson (footballer, born 1933) (1933–2010), Scottish football defender
- Alex Wilson (skier) (born 1974), American skier
- Alex Wilson (baseball) (born 1986), baseball pitcher
- Alex Wilson (Swiss sprinter) (born 1990)
- Alex Wilson (basketball) (born 1994), Australian basketball player

== Other people ==
- Alexander Wilson (astronomer) (1714–1786), Scottish type-maker, meteorologist and astronomer
- Alexander Wilson (ornithologist) (1766–1813), Scottish-American poet and ornithologist
- Sir Alexander Wilson, 1st Baronet (1837–1907), Scottish steel company executive
- Alexander Stoddart Wilson (1854–1909), Scottish minister and botanist
- Alexander Wilson (photographer) (died 1922), Scottish amateur photographer of Dundee
- Alexander Brown Wilson (1857–1938), Australian architect based in Queensland
- Alexander Wilson (British architect) (1888–1969), English architect based in Nottingham
- Alex Wilson (musician) (born 1971), English salsa and Latin jazz pianist

== See also ==
- Alexandra Wilson (born 1968), American actress
- Alexandra Wilkis Wilson, American entrepreneur
- Al Wilson (disambiguation)
- Sandy Wilson (disambiguation)
