= Alfred Wilson =

Alfred or Alf Wilson may refer to:

- Alfred Wilson (cricketer) (1828–1908), English cricketer and barrister
- John Alfred Wilson (1833–1904), U.S. Army Medal of Honor recipient in the American Civil War
- Alfred Roscoe Wilson (1882–1964), Anglican Dean of Melbourne
- Alf Wilson (English footballer) (1890–after 1919), English footballer
- Alf Wilson (Australian footballer) (1902–1984), Australian rules footballer
- Alfred Wilson (rower) (1903–1989), American Olympic rower
- Alfred Wilson (rugby union) (1904–1985), Scottish rugby union player
- Alf Wilson (boxer) (1908–?), South African Olympic boxer
- Alfred Wilson, Baron Wilson of Radcliffe (1909–1983), British co-operative movement figure and life peer
- Alfred L. Wilson (1919–1944), U.S. Army soldier and Medal of Honor recipient in World War II
- A. Jeyaratnam Wilson (1928–2000), Sri Lankan Tamil academic, historian and author
- Alfred M. Wilson (1948–1969), U.S. Marine and Medal of Honor recipient in the Vietnam War

== See also ==
- Al Wilson (disambiguation)
