= George Fleming =

George Fleming may refer to:

- Sir George Fleming, 2nd Baronet (1667–1747), British churchman
- George Fleming (American football) (1938–2021), American football player and politician in Washington State
- George Fleming (engineer), Scottish civil engineer
- George Fleming (explorer) (1800?–1880?), African American explorer and trader
- George S. Fleming, American filmmaker
- George Fleming (footballer, born 1859) (1859–1912), Scottish footballer (Everton)
- George Fleming (footballer, born 1869) (1869–1922), Scottish footballer (Wolves, Liverpool)
- George Fleming (footballer, born 1948), Scottish footballer (Hearts, Dundee United)
- George Raphael Fleming (1850–1909), Scottish rugby union player
- George Fleming (veterinary surgeon) (1833–1901), Scottish veterinary surgeon
- Julia Constance Fletcher or George Fleming (1853–1938), American writer
- George Fleming (composer), co-writer with Steve Winwood of the song Freedom Overspill

== See also ==
- George Fleming Davis (1911–1945), US Navy officer and Medal of Honor recipient
