= Bert Wilson =

Bert Wilson may refer to:

- Bert Wilson (sportscaster) (1911–1955), American baseball broadcaster
- Bert Wilson (ice hockey) (1949–1992), ice hockey player
- Bert Wilson (musician) (1939–2013), American jazz clarinetist and saxophonist
- Bertram Martin Wilson (1896–1935), English mathematician
- Robert P. Wilson (1875–1959), American college football player and coach, head football coach at Wesleyan University (1898–1902) and New York University (1903)

== See also ==
- Albert Wilson (disambiguation)
- Robert Wilson (disambiguation)
- Herbert Wilson (disambiguation)
- Hubert Wilson (disambiguation)
- Bertie Wilson, polo player, see Harold Ernest Brassey
