= 1981 Senior League World Series =

American youth baseball tournament

Tournament information
- Location: Gary, Indiana
- Dates: August 17–22, 1981

Final positions
- Champions: Georgetown, Delaware
- Runner-up: Danville, California

The 1981 Senior League World Series took place from August 17–22 in Gary, Indiana, United States. Georgetown, Delaware defeated Danville, California in the championship game.

Taiwan's streak of nine consecutive SLWS titles ended as they finished in third place. The mark of nine straight championships still stands for all divisions of Little League baseball, and softball.

== Teams ==
United States	International
(Delaware) Georgetown, Delaware East	(British Columbia) Surrey, British Columbia Canada
(Michigan) Taylor, Michigan North	(Belgium) Mons, Belgium; SHAPE; Europe
(Florida) Fort Myers, Florida South	(Taiwan) Taipei, Taiwan Far East
(California) Danville, California West	Aruba, Netherlands Antilles Latin America

== Results ==
Upper round 1	Upper round 2	Upper final	World Championship
—	California	3
—	Taiwan	1
1–0	California	10
1–0	Netherlands Antilles	7
—	Netherlands Antilles (F/10)	3
—	Canada	2
2–0	California	1
2–0	Delaware	2
—	Belgium	1
—	Delaware	15
1–0	Delaware	12
1–0	Michigan	2
—	Florida	2
—	Michigan	6	3–0	Delaware	15	—
3–1	California	4	—
Lower round 1	Lower round 2	Lower round 3	Lower final
1–1	Michigan	1
0–1	Taiwan	7	1–1	Taiwan	20	2–1	California (F/9)	7
0–1	Canada	1	2–1	Taiwan	3	3–1	Taiwan	6
2–1	Netherlands Antilles	2
1–1	Netherlands Antilles	18
0–1	Belgium	0	1–1	Florida	1
0–1	Florida	7

1981 Senior League World Series Champions
Georgetown, Delaware
