= Al Wilson (disambiguation) =

Al Wilson (born 1977) is a former American football player.

Al Wilson may also refer to:

- Al Wilson (pilot) (1895–1932), American film actor, producer and stunt pilot
- Al Wilson (singer) (1939–2008), American soul singer
- Al Wilson (offensive lineman) (born 1950), Canadian football player
- Al Wilson (wrestling) (born 1975), father of former World Wrestling Entertainment diva Torrie Wilson

== See also ==
- Alan Wilson (disambiguation)
- Albert Wilson (disambiguation)
- Alexander Wilson (disambiguation)
- Alfred Wilson (disambiguation)
