= Tom Richardson (pitcher) =

- Pitcher
- Born: April 14, 1905; DeLand, Florida, U.S.
- Batted: Unknown Threw: Unknown

Negro league baseball debut
- 1930, for the Havana Red Sox

Last appearance
- 1934, for the Philadelphia Bacharach Giants

Teams
- Havana Red Sox (1930); Cuban House of David (1931); Washington Pilots (1932); Philadelphia Stars (1933); Baltimore Sox/Black Sox (1933–1934); Philadelphia Bacharach Giants (1934)

Thomas Richardson (April 14, 1905 – death date unknown) was an American professional baseball pitcher in the Negro leagues. He played with several clubs from 1930 to 1934. His career is sometimes combined with Henry Richardson.
