= Sandy Wilson (disambiguation) =

Sandy Wilson may refer to:

- Sir Andrew Wilson (RAF officer) (born 1941)
- Sir Colin St John Wilson (1922–2007), British architect, lecturer, and author
- Sandy Wilson (director) (born 1947), Canadian film director
- Sandy Wilson (1924–2014), English composer and lyricist.
- Sandy Fife Wilson (born 1950), Native American art educator, fashion designer and artist

== See also ==
- Alexander Wilson (disambiguation)
