= Herbert Wilson (Nottinghamshire cricketer) =

English cricketer

Herbert Wilson (22 May 1892 – 3 June 1972) was an English first-class cricketer active 1911–34 who played for Nottinghamshire. He was born in Eastwood, Nottinghamshire; died in Macclesfield.
