= Alf Wilson (Australian footballer) =

Australian rules footballer, born 1902

Personal information
- Full name: Alfred Wilson
- Born: 20 May 1902
- Died: 2 June 1984 (aged 82)
- Original team: Carlton District
- Height: 170 cm (5 ft 7 in)
- Weight: 66 kg (146 lb)

Playing career^{1}
Years	Club	Games (Goals)
1921–1925	Melbourne	41 (10)
- ^{1} Playing statistics correct to the end of 1925.

Alfred Wilson (20 May 1902 – 2 June 1984) was an Australian rules footballer who played for the Melbourne Football Club in the Victorian Football League (VFL). His brother, Percy, was Melbourne's captain-coach at the time he was recruited.
