= Alan Wilson (Australian rules footballer) =

Australian rules footballer

Personal information
- Full name: Alan Wilson
- Born: 2 November 1939 (age 87)
- Height: 173 cm (5 ft 8 in)
- Weight: 81 kg (179 lb)

Playing career^{1}
Years	Club	Games (Goals)
1959	Fitzroy	2 (2)
- ^{1} Playing statistics correct to the end of 1959.

Alan Wilson (born 2 November 1939) is a former Australian rules footballer who played for the Fitzroy Football Club in the Victorian Football League (VFL).
