= Albert Wilson (botanist) =

American botanist, landscape architect, author, teacher, and lecturer

Albert Wilson (August 1903 – March 8, 1996), was an American botanist, landscape architect, author, teacher and lecturer on gardening and landscaping, and a TV and radio talk show personality who wrote several books popularizing gardening, and an autobiography.

== Early life and education ==
An orphan, Wilson's earliest years were spent growing up in a San Francisco, California orphanage, an experience he reminisced upon in his book, These Were the Children. In 1927, Wilson earned his bachelor's degree in botany and, in 1934, his master's in biology, both from Stanford University.

== Dig It with Albert ==
For many years, Wilson had a regular talk show, Dig It with Albert, broadcast on San Francisco's KGO 810 AM. The original show was called How does your Garden grow and was produced with the help of his manager, George Turkmany. He was on the local PBS TV member station, KQED. He also had a show on KCSM-TV in the late sixties. Wilson was a frequent guest lecturer at local gardening clubs and nurseries throughout the San Francisco Bay area, mentoring and befriending many attendees. He designed and built his home in 1929, on Creek Drive in Menlo Park, California. Wilson was also well known as a landscape architect, having designed Allied Arts and Fremont Park in Menlo Park, and countless backyards and gardens throughout the San Francisco Bay area.

== How Does Your Garden Grow? ==
How Does Your Garden Grow? is one of the gardening books written by Wilson, who was genuinely interested, not just in gardens, but in the gardeners who tended them. Though at one time he spoke positively upon the seemingly miraculous wonders of pesticides and herbicides, Wilson was an early advocate of wearing protective garments while using the primitive agricultural chemicals of the mid-20th century. Later, Wilson's stance changed, because of the health problems and deaths of many of his friends and colleagues, caused by chemicals such as DDT. He was also an early advocate of organic gardening.

Wilson's dedication to gardening went beyond landscaping, writing and broadcasting. He spoke at many gardening club meetings and nursery seminars. Among the clubs Wilson was involved with was the Foothill Men's Garden Club, which he co-founded in 1962. The club, which encompasses Santa Clara and San Mateo counties, raises money to preserve the natural environment through the sales of members' homegrown products in an annual garden sale.

== Death and memorial ==
Wilson died at age 93 after apparently falling down a steep ravine bank into San Francisquito Creek, near his Menlo Park home. In 1996, the 32nd annual Foothill Men's Garden Club show was dedicated to Wilson. Dig it with Albert was remembered with a collection of photos of the beloved gardening expert and writer.

The Stanford Club of Palo Alto established a memorial fund for Wilson, with proceeds going toward the reconstruction of the Rodin Sculpture Garden at Stanford University. Wilson planned and landscaped the original flower garden of the Rodin Sculpture Garden in 1986.

== Publications ==
- Wilson, Albert (1938). Distinctive Trees, Shrubs and Vines in Gardens of the S. F. Peninsula. Happy Hours Publishing. ISBN 1-112-77924-8.
- Wilson, Albert (1949). How Does Your Garden Grow. Happy Hours Publishing. ISBN 0-933845-00-6.
- Wilson, Albert (1953). Gardeners All in California. Happy Hours Publishing.
- Wilson, Albert (1963). These Were the Children. Wilson.
