= Pen Gilliard =

American baseball player

- Outfielder
- Born: May 13, 1904; Mansfield, Louisiana, U.S.
- Died: May 22, 1981 (aged 77); Los Angeles, California, U.S.
- Threw: Left

Negro league baseball debut
- 1937, for the Memphis Red Sox

Last appearance
- 1938, for the Kansas City Monarchs
- Stats at Baseball Reference

Teams
- Memphis Red Sox (1937); Chicago American Giants (1938); Kansas City Monarchs (1938)

Peniker Gilliard (May 13, 1904 – May 22, 1981) was an American Negro league outfielder in the 1930s.

A native of Mansfield, Louisiana, Gilliard made his Negro leagues debut in 1937 with the Memphis Red Sox. He finished his career the following season with the Chicago American Giants and Kansas City Monarchs. Gilliard died in Los Angeles, California in 1981 at age 77. He was interred at Rose Hills Memorial Park.
