= Henry Richardson (baseball) =

American baseball player

- Pitcher
- Born: August 26, 1917; Bessemer, Alabama, U.S.
- Died: July 10, 1981 (aged 63); Bethel Park, Pennsylvania, U.S.
- Batted: Unknown Threw: Unknown

Negro league baseball debut
- 1938, for the Washington Black Senators

Last appearance
- 1938, for the Pittsburgh Crawfords

Teams
- Washington Black Senators (1938); Pittsburgh Crawfords (1938)

Henry Richardson (August 26, 1917 – July 10, 1981) was an American professional baseball pitcher in the Negro leagues. He played with the Washington Black Senators and the Pittsburgh Crawfords in 1938. His career is sometimes combined with Tom Richardson.
