= Alan Wilson (Irish criminal) =

Irish criminal, member of the Kinahan gang

Alan Wilson is an Irish criminal who is part of the Kinahan Organised Crime Group.

== Murder of Marioara Rostas ==
Marioara Rostas was an eighteen-year-old from Romania who disappeared from Dublin city centre on 6 January 2008. She had been begging with one of her brothers at the junction of Pearse Street and Lombard Street. Her brother saw her get into a car and when he went over to it the driver said they were going to McDonald's for food and would return later. She phoned relatives in Romania before she disappeared.

She was killed by four shots to her head. Her body was buried in a shallow grave in the Dublin/Wicklow Mountains and was not discovered until 2012.

Alan Wilson went on trial for her murder in 2014 and pleaded not guilty. The jury found him not guilty.

== Meat cleaver attack ==
On 3 June 2009 Wilson and David Crowley broke into a house in Blanchardstown and attacked a man with a meat cleaver. They were convicted in 2013 with Wilson being sentenced to seven years and Crowley to eight.

In 2017 he won an appeal over the conviction on the grounds that the offence he was charged with was different from the one he was cautioned and questioned about. The Supreme Court directed there could be a retrial for Wilson, but counsel for the Director of Public Prosecutions told the court there would be no retrial as Wilson had, with remission, served most of his sentence.

== Players Lounge shooting ==
In 2010 three men were shot at the Players Lounge in Fairview. Two of them suffered life-altering injuries. None of them were the intended target of the shooting. Wilson pleaded guilty to conspiracy to murder persons unknown and to firearms offences. He said he was approached by dissident republicans in relation to the crime and denied being in a gang. A retired member of the Garda National Surveillance Unit testified that in 2017 he believed Wilson was a member of the Kinahan gang. He was sentenced to ten years for conspiracy and seven and a half years for the firearms offences. Charges of attempted murder of the three men were dropped after the DPP entered a nolle prosequi.

== Attempted murder of Gary Hanley ==
In 2019 he was convicted of conspiring to murder Gary Hanley in an ongoing feud. He was sentenced to six years imprisonment.
