= Herbert Wilson (footballer) =

Australian rules footballer

Personal information
- Full name: Herbert Norman Wilson
- Born: 26 December 1893; Oakleigh, Victoria
- Died: 17 December 1956 (aged 62); Perth, Western Australia
- Original team: Hawthorn (VJFA)

Playing career^{1}
Years	Club	Games (Goals)
1913	Essendon	1 (0)
- ^{1} Playing statistics correct to the end of 1913.

Herbert Norman Wilson (26 December 1893 – 17 December 1956) was an Australian rules footballer who played with Essendon in the Victorian Football League (VFL).

A wingman recruited from Hawthorn, Wilson played his one only VFL match for Essendon against Melbourne in Round 9 of the 1913 VFL season after Essendon made wholesale changes to its side that had played two matches on the previous long weekend (a regular Saturday fixture and another on the King's Birthday Monday). He did not play another senior game for the club.

He later fought in France during World War I.
