= Alan Wilson (cricketer, born 1942) =

English cricketer

Personal information
- Full name: Alan Geoffrey Wilson
- Born: 1 June 1942 (age 84); Kendal, Westmorland, England
- Batting: Right-handed
- Bowling: Right-arm medium

Domestic team information
- Years: Team
- 1963–1984: Cumberland

Career statistics
| Competition | List A |
|---|---|
| Matches | 1 |
| Runs scored | 10 |
| Batting average | 10.00 |
| 100s/50s | 0/0 |
| Top score | 10 |
| Catches/stumpings | 0/– |
- Source: ESPNcricinfo, 26 March 2011

Alan Geoffrey Wilson (born 1 June 1942) is a former English cricketer. Wilson was a right-handed batsman who bowled right-arm medium pace. He was born in Kendal, Westmorland.

Wilson made his debut for Cumberland in the 1963 Minor Counties Championship against Durham. He continued to represent Cumberland sporadically to 1984, playing 57 Minor Counties Championship matches. Toward the end of his career he played two MCCA Knockout Trophy matches against Northumberland in 1983 and Cheshire in 1984. He played his only List A match in 1984, when Cumberland played Derbyshire in the NatWest Trophy. In this match he scored 10 runs before being dismissed by Kim Barnett. Wilson captained Cumberland in this match.
