= Allan Wilson (Australian footballer) =

Australian rules footballer, born 1916

Personal information
- Full name: Allan Wilson
- Born: 27 April 1916
- Died: 4 February 1984 (aged 67)
- Height: 175 cm (5 ft 9 in)
- Weight: 85 kg (187 lb)

Playing career^{1}
Years	Club	Games (Goals)
1944	North Melbourne	1 (0)
- ^{1} Playing statistics correct to the end of 1944.

Allan Wilson (27 April 1916 – 4 February 1984) was an Australian rules footballer who played for the North Melbourne Football Club in the Victorian Football League (VFL).
