= Hubert Wilson (baseball) =

American baseball player

- Pitcher
- Born: September 19, 1902; Van Alstyne, Texas, U.S.
- Died: October 21, 1981 (aged 79); Houston, Texas, U.S.
- Threw: Right

Negro league baseball debut
- 1928, for the Kansas City Monarchs

Last appearance
- 1929, for the Kansas City Monarchs

Teams
- Kansas City Monarchs (1928–1929)

Hubert Roosevelt Wilson (September 19, 1902 – October 21, 1981), nicknamed "Tack", was an American Negro league pitcher in the 1920s.

A native of Van Alstyne, Texas, Wilson attended Texas College. He pitched for the Kansas City Monarchs in 1928 and 1929, posting an 8–2 record with a 3.21 ERA in 17 recorded games over the two seasons. Wilson died in Houston, Texas in 1981 at age 79.
