= Alexander Wilson (Canadian writer) =

American teacher and landscape designer

Alexander Wilson (25 May 1953 – 26 October 1993) was a writer, teacher, landscape designer, and community activist.

Born in Ottawa, Illinois, Wilson grew up in Oakland, California. In 1977, he moved to Canada, where he lived and worked in Toronto, Ontario.

Wilson advocated restoring indigenous plant species to the urban landscape, thereby promoting urban biodiversity and reconnecting urban dwellers with the natural history of the place in which they live. He believed that combining ecological restoration and community gardening could be a way to nurture and improve not only urban ecosystems, but also social and economic relations. In his book, The Culture of Nature: North American Landscape from Disney to the Exxon Valdez (1991), he dealt with the ways in which culture informs and constructs our understanding of "nature", and he examined the colonisation and appropriation of nature by the city (particularly via the automobile).

Wilson established the Garrison Creek Planting Company with artist Stephen Andrews (his life partner) and horticulturist Kim Delaney. He also designed the landscaping for the AIDS Memorial, Cawthra Park, itself designed by Patrick Fahn. Following Wilson's death from AIDS-related causes, his own memorial plaque was added to the others in the park.

On an urban lot near his house Wilson created a reclaimed garden that, after his death, friends tried to buy and preserve. Though they were unsuccessful in that project they did find another downtown lot on which a garden was created and named in his memory, the Alex Wilson Community Garden, which opened in June 1998 at 552 Richmond Street West in Toronto.

A plaque in the park includes a quoted passage from The Culture of Nature:

"We must build landscapes that heal, connect, and that make intelligible our relationships with each other, and the natural world: places that welcome and enclose, whose breaks and edges are never without meaning. We urgently need people living on the land, caring for it, working out an idea of nature that includes human culture and human livelihood. All of that calls for a new culture of nature and it cannot come soon enough."

== Bibliography ==
- The Culture of Nature: North American Landscape from Disney to the Exxon Valdez. Toronto: Between the Lines, 1991.
