= George Fleming (explorer) =

African-American explorer and trader

George Fleming (1800? – 1880?) was an African-American explorer and trader. A former slave, he accompanied David Livingstone in exploring northern Botswana and central Africa.

In 1849, Fleming served as cook on the expedition of Livingstone, William Oswell, Mungo Murray and Hubert Wilson to 'discover' Lake Ngami. In 1851, he travelled to the BaKololo with Livingstone and Oswell. Backed financially by Howson Rutherford, Fleming established himself as a trader in the interior. In 1853, he explored the Zambezi with Livingstone, and after separating from Livingstone may have been the first explorer to visit Victoria Falls. In 1856, he carried London Missionary Society supplies to Livingstone in Quelimane, Mozambique. Thereafter he disappears from the record, though he is said to have been living at the Cape in the 1870s.
