= List of New South Wales representative cricketers =

This is a list of male cricketers who have played for New South Wales in first-class, List A and Twenty20 cricket. It is complete to the end of the 2017–18 season. The list refers to the sides named as "New South Wales" and does not include players who have appeared for the Sydney-based T20 sides unless they have appeared also in games under the NSW name.

Players are listed in alphabetical order.

== A ==
- Sean Abbott (2010–11 to date) : S. A. Abbott
- Claude Achurch (1921–22) : C. S. Achurch
- Ted Adams (1919–20) : E. W. Adams
- Francis Adams (1858–59) : F. Adams
- Warwick Adlam (1993–94 to 1996–97) : W. J. Adlam
- Henry Allan (1871–72) : H. A. Allan
- Reginald Allen (1878–79 to 1887–88) : R. C. Allen
- Phil Alley (1990–91 to 1997–98) : P. J. S. Alley
- Bill Alley (1945–46 to 1947–48) : W. E. Alley
- John Alleyne (1927–28) : J. P. Alleyne
- Arthur Allsopp (1929–30 to 1930–31) : A. H. Allsopp
- Gordon Amos (1926–27 to 1931–32) : G. S. Amos
- Allan Anderson (1971–72 to 1972–73) : A. D. Anderson
- Peter Anderson (1966–67) : P. G. Anderson
- Tommy Andrews (1912–13 to 1928–29) : T. J. E. Andrews
- Cassie Andrews (1928–29 to 1930–31) : W. C. Andrews
- Tim Armstrong (2010–11) : T. J. Armstrong
- Jason Arnberger (1994–95 to 1996–97) : J. L. Arnberger
- Percival Arnott (1911–12 to 1912–13) : P. S. Arnott
- Oswald Asher (1919–20 to 1925–26) : O. P. Asher
- Albert Atkins (1896–97) : A. Atkins
- Sydney Austin (1892–93 to 1893–94) : S. W. Austin

== B ==
- Charlie Baker (1968–69) : C. R. Baker
- Alick Bannerman (1876–77 to 1893–94) : A. C. Bannerman
- Charles Bannerman (1870–71 to 1887–88) : C. Bannerman
- Eric Barbour (1908–09 to 1914–15) : E. P. Barbour
- Mick Bardsley (1920–21 to 1925–26) : R. Bardsley
- Warren Bardsley (1903–04 to 1925–26) : W. Bardsley
- Charles Barnes (1904–05 to 1912–13) : J. C. Barnes
- Sid Barnes (1936–37 to 1952–53) : S. G. Barnes
- Barry Bates (1959–60 to 1960–61) : B. Bates
- Trevor Bayliss (1985–86 to 1996–97) : T. H. Bayliss
- James Beal (1855–56) : J. C. Beal
- Graeme Beard (1975–76 to 1981–82) : G. R. Beard
- Bill Beath (1946–47 to 1947–48) : N. R. J. Beath
- Chris Beatty (1977–78 to 1978–79) : C. Beatty
- Reg Beatty (1936–37) : R. G. Beatty
- John Beeston (1857–58 to 1860–61) : J. L. Beeston
- Samuel Belcher (1866–67) : S. H. Belcher
- John Benaud (1966–67 to 1972–73) : J. Benaud
- Richie Benaud (1948–49 to 1963–64) : R. Benaud
- Albert Bennett (1930–31) : A. Bennett
- George Bennett (1933–34) : G. H. Bennett
- Murray Bennett (1982–83 to 1987–88) : M. J. Bennett
- Gary Bensley (1981–82 to 1983–84) : G. R. Bensley
- Steve Bernard (1970–71 to 1978–79) : S. R. Bernard
- Edward Berrie (1913–14) : E. B. Berrie
- Lyall Berry (1918–19 to 1919–20) : W. L. Berry
- Leslie Best (1914–15) : L. Best
- John Bettington (1927–28) : B. C. J. Bettington
- Reg Bettington (1928–29 to 1931–32) : R. H. B. Bettington
- Michael Bevan (1990–91 to 2003–04) : M. G. Bevan
- Wendell Bill (1929–30 to 1934–35) : O. W. Bill
- Nicholas Bills (2010–11) : N. D. Bills
- Aaron Bird (2005–06 to 2009–10) : A. C. Bird
- Gordon Black (1903–04) : G. G. Black
- Colin Blackman (1966–67 to 1968–69) : O. C. Blackman
- Marcus Blaxland (1903–04 to 1907–08) : M. H. Blaxland
- Phillip Blizzard (1985–86) : P. A. Blizzard
- James Bogle (1918–19 to 1920–21) : J. Bogle
- Doug Bollinger (2002–03 to date) : D. E. Bollinger
- George Bonnor (1884–85 to 1890–91) : G. J. Bonnor
- Brian Booth (1954–55 to 1968–69) : B. C. Booth
- Allan Border (1976–77 to 1979–80) : A. R. Border
- Marcus Bosley (1924–25) : M. W. Bosley
- Albert Bowden (1899–1900 to 1907–08) : A. J. Bowden
- Rod Bower (1983–84 to 1986–87) : R. J. Bower
- Raymond Boyce (1921–22) : R. C. M. Boyce
- Trevor Boyd (1966–67 to 1969–70) : T. J. Boyd
- Nathan Bracken (1998–99 to 2009–10) : N. W. Bracken
- Donald Bradman (1927–28 to 1933–34) : D. G. Bradman
- Sidney Bradridge (1855–56) : J. S. Bradridge
- Shawn Bradstreet (1998–99 to 2004–05) : S. D. Bradstreet
- Jeremy Bray (1997–98) : J. P. Bray
- Robert Brewster (1893–94) : R. C. Brewster
- Ron Briggs (1952–53 to 1954–55) : R. E. Briggs
- Tom Brooks (1946–47 to 1952–53) : T. F. Brooks
- Edward Brown (1859–60) : E. Brown
- Edward Brown (1920–21) : E. K. F. Brown
- Bill Brown (1932–33 to 1934–35) : W. A. Brown
- Fairfax Brown (1919–20 to 1925–26) : W. G. F. Brown
- Richard Bryant (1882–83 to 1884–85) : R. Bryant
- Ernest Bubb (1905–06 to 1908–09) : E. R. Bubb
- Roy Bubb (1924–25) : R. A. R. Bubb
- Sandy Buckle (1913–14) : F. Buckle
- Eric Bull (1913–14 to 1914–15) : E. A. Bull
- Jarrad Burke (2005–06) : J. N. Burke
- Jim Burke (1948–49 to 1958–59) : J. W. Burke
- J. Burrows (1877–78) : J. Burrows
- Selby Burt (1928–29 to 1929–30) : S. J. W. Burt
- Frederick Burton (1885–86 to 1895–96) : F. J. Burton

== C ==
- Billy Caffyn (1865–66 to 1870–71) : W. Caffyn
- Tim Caldwell (1935–36 to 1936–37) : T. C. J. Caldwell
- John Callachor (1882–83) : J. J. C. Callachor
- Norman Callaway (1914–15) : N. F. Callaway
- Sydney Callaway (1888–89 to 1895–96) : S. T. Callaway
- Mark Cameron (2002–03 to 2010–11) : M. A. Cameron
- Norval Campbell (1926–27 to 1934–35) : J. N. Campbell
- Leslie Campbell (1925–26) : L. P. Campbell
- William Camphin (1892–93 to 1894–95) : W. J. Camphin
- Roy Campling (1922–23) : C. R. Campling
- Keith Carmody (1939–40 to 1946–47) : D. K. Carmody
- Sid Carroll (1945–46 to 1958–59) : S. J. Carroll
- Sammy Carter (1897–98 to 1924–25) : H. Carter
- Jack Carter (1928–29) : W. J. S. Carter
- Ryan Carters (2013–14 to 2016–17) : R. G. L. Carters
- Beau Casson (2006–07 to 2011–12) : B. Casson
- George Chapman (1924–25) : G. A. N. Chapman
- Ross Chapman (1972–73) : R. A. Chapman
- Trevor Chappell (1979–80 to 1985–86) : T. M. Chappell
- Dave Chardon (1975–76) : D. M. Chardon
- Percie Charlton (1888–89 to 1897–98) : P. C. Charlton
- Richard Chee Quee (1992–93 to 1997–1998) : R. Chee Quee
- Albert Cheetham (1936–37 to 1939–40) : A. G. Cheetham
- Jack Chegwyn (1940–41 to 1941–42) : J. W. Chegwyn
- Hugh Chilvers (1929–30 to 1936–37) : H. C. Chilvers
- Arthur Chipperfield (1933–34 to 1939–40) : A. G. Chipperfield
- Daniel Christian (2005–06 to 2006–07) : D. T. Christian
- Anthony Clark (2000–01 to 2001–02) : A. M. Clark
- John Clark (1953–54) : J. L. Clark
- Stuart Clark (1997–98 to 2010–11) : S. R. Clark
- Alfred Clarke (1889–90 to 1891–92) : A. E. Clarke
- Gother Clarke (1899–1900 to 1901–02) : G. R. C. Clarke
- John Clarke (1859–60 to 1862–63) : J. T. Clarke
- Michael Clarke (1999–2000 to 2013–14) : M. J. Clarke
- James Cleeve (1882–83 to 1883–84) : J. O. Cleeve
- Mark Clews (1976–77 to 1978–79) : M. L. Clews
- Peter Clifford (1983–84 to 1985–86) : P. S. Clifford
- Joseph Coates (1867–68 to 1879–80) : J. Coates
- Thomas Cobcroft (1895–96) : L. T. Cobcroft
- Burt Cockley (2007–08 to 2009–10) : B. T. Cockley
- Leslie Cody (1912–13 to 1913–14) : L. A. Cody
- Morton Cohen (1939–40 to 1940–41) : M. B. Cohen
- David Colley (1969–70 to 1977–78) : D. J. Colley
- Herbie Collins (1909–10 to 1925–26) : H. L. Collins
- Ross Collins (1967–68 to 1975–76) : R. P. Collins
- Vincent Collins (1941–42 to 1947–48) : V. A. Collins
- Bernard Colreavy (1899–1900) : B. X. Colreavy
- Arthur Coningham (1892–93 to 1898–99) : A. Coningham
- Thomas Connell (1896–97) : T. W. C. Connell
- Harry Conway (2015–16 to date) : H. N. A. Conway
- Bruce Cook (1940–41) : B. Cook
- Simon Cook (1995–96 to 2000–01) : S. H. Cook
- Allan Cooper (1935–36) : A. F. Cooper
- Bryce Cooper (1928–29 to 1929–30) : B. A. Cooper
- Trent Copeland (2009–10 to date) : T. A. Copeland
- Grahame Corling (1963–64 to 1968–69) : G. E. Corling
- Sam Cosstick (1865–66) : S. Cosstick
- John Cottam (1886–87 to 1889–90) : J. T. Cottam
- Tibby Cotter (1901–02 to 1913–14) : A. Cotter
- Ted Cotton (1952–53 to 1954–55) : E. K. Cotton
- Ed Cowan (2004–05 to date) : E. J. M. Cowan
- Owen Cowley (1893–94) : O. W. Cowley
- George Cowper (1888–89 to 1889–90) : G. L. Cowper
- Scott Coyte (2006–07 to 2011–12) : S. J. Coyte
- Ian Craig (1951–52 to 1961–62) : I. D. Craig
- Mason Crane (2016–17) : M. S. Crane
- Mudgee Cranney (1909–10 to 1921–22) : H. Cranney
- Pat Crawford (1954–55 to 1957–58) : W. P. A. Crawford
- Ron Crippin (1970–71 to 1978–79) : R. J. Crippin
- Bob Cristofani (1941–42 to 1946–47) : D. R. Cristofani
- Ernie Crossan (1937–38 to 1945–46) : E. E. Crossan
- Tim Cruickshank (2010–11 to 2012–13) : T. D. Cruickshank
- John Cuffe (1902–03) : J. A. Cuffe
- Daniel Cullen (1912–13 to 1913–14) : D. R. Cullen
- William Cullen (1914–15) : W. Cullen
- Frank Cummins (1925–26 to 1932–33) : F. S. Cummins
- Pat Cummins (2010–11 to date) : P. J. Cummins
- George Curtis (1861–62 to 1865–66) : G. T. Curtis
- Norman Cush (1934–35) : N. L. Cush

== D ==
- David D'Arcy (1862–63) : D. D'Arcy
- Alan Davidson (1949–50 to 1962–63) : A. K. Davidson
- Hugh Davidson (1927–28 to 1930–31) : H. L. Davidson
- Geoff Davies (1965–66 to 1971–72) : G. R. Davies
- Horrie Davis (1911–12 to 1924–25) : H. H. Davis
- Ian Davis (1973–74 to 1982–83) : I. C. Davis
- Jonas Davis (1879–80 to 1893–94) : J. J. Davis
- Rod Davison (1993–94 to 1999–2000) : R. J. Davison
- David Dawson (2011–12 to 2012–13) : D. G. Dawson
- Oscar Dean (1907–08) : O. H. Dean
- Norman Deane (1902–03 to 1908–09) : N. Y. Deane
- Sydney Deane (1889–90) : S. L. Deane
- Jim de Courcy (1947–48 to 1957–58) : J. H. de Courcy
- Frank Devenish-Meares (1901–02) : F. Devenish-Meares
- Austin Diamond (1899–1900 to 1918–19) : A. Diamond
- George Dickson (1859–60 to 1871–72) : G. D. Dickson
- Percy Dive (1924–25) : P. W. Dive
- Arthur Docker (1871–72) : A. R. Docker
- Cyril Docker (1909–10) : C. T. Docker
- Ernest Docker (1862–63) : E. B. Docker
- Keith Docker (1919–20) : K. B. Docker
- Phillip Docker (1910–11) : P. W. Docker
- Bill Donaldson (1945–46 to 1949–50) : W. P. J. Donaldson
- Richard Done (1978–79 to 1985–86) : R. P. Done
- Harry Donnan (1887–88 to 1900–01) : H. Donnan
- Jim Donnelly (1929–30 to 1931–32) : J. L. Donnelly
- Luke Doran (2010–11 to 2012–13) : L. A. Doran
- Francis Downes (1881–82 to 1890–91) : F. Downes
- Richard Driver (1855–56) : R. Driver
- Reggie Duff (1898–99 to 1907–08) : R. A. Duff
- Walter Duff (1902–03) : W. S. Duff
- Jimmy Dummett (1876–77 to 1877–78) : W. Dummett
- Harry Dupain (1927–28 to 1929–30) : F. H. Dupain
- Ben Dwarshuis (2016–17) : B. J. Dwarshuis
- Chappie Dwyer (1918–19 to 1928–29) : E. A. Dwyer
- Greg Dyer (1983–84 to 1988–89) : G. C. Dyer
- John Dyson (1975–76 to 1989–90) : J. Dyson

== E ==
- Frank Easton (1933–34 to 1938–39) : F. A. Easton
- Ronald Eaton (1928–29) : H. R. Eaton
- Norman Ebsworth (1902–03) : N. Ebsworth
- Mickey Edwards (2017–18) : M. W. Edwards
- Ross Edwards (1979–80) : R. Edwards
- Thomas Egan (1924–25) : T. C. W. Egan
- Les Ellis (1964–65) : L. G. Ellis
- Phil Emery (1987–88 to 1998–99) : P. A. Emery
- Sid Emery (1908–09 to 1912–13) : S. H. Emery
- Vic Emery (1948–49) : V. R. Emery
- Edwin Evans (1874–75 to 1887–88) : E. Evans
- Sam Everett (1921–22 to 1929–30) : C. S. Everett
- Harold Evers (1896–97 to 1901–02) : H. A. Evers

== F ==
- Arthur Fagan (1953–54 to 1956–57) : A. M. Fagan
- Alan Fairfax (1928–29 to 1931–32) : A. G. Fairfax
- Robert Fairweather (1868–69) : R. J. Fairweather
- Monty Faithfull (1870–71 to 1874–75) : H. M. Faithfull
- Daniel Fallins (2017–18) D. G. Fallins
- Les Fallowfield (1934–35 to 1941–42) : L. J. Fallowfield
- Bill Farnsworth (1908–09) : A. W. Farnsworth
- Wally Farquhar (1894–95 to 1903–04) : B. W. Farquhar
- Frank Farrar (1914–15) : F. M. Farrar
- John Ferris (1886–87 to 1897–98) : J. J. Ferris
- Jack Fingleton (1928–29 to 1939–40) : J. H. W. Fingleton
- Arthur Fisher (1903–04 to 1907–08) : A. D. W. Fisher
- Jack Fitzpatrick (1937–38 to 1938–39) : J. H. Fitzpatrick
- Ray Flockton (1951–52 to 1962–63) : R. G. Flockton
- John Flynn (1914–15) : J. P. Flynn
- Bert Folkard (1910–11 to 1920–21) : B. J. Folkard
- Doug Ford (1957–58 to 1963–64) : D. A. Ford
- Peter Forrest (2006–07 to 2010–11) : P. J. Forrest
- Ted Forssberg (1920–21 to 1921–22) : E. E. B. Forssberg
- Thomas Foster (1903–04) : T. H. Foster
- Norman Fox (1926–27) : N. H. Fox
- Bruce Francis (1968–69 to 1972–73) : B. C. Francis
- Keith Francis (1957–58) : K. R. Francis
- David Freedman (1991–92 to 1998–99) : D. A. Freedman
- Arthur Furness (1895–96) : A. J. Furness

== G ==
- Leornard Garnsey (1904–05 to 1906–07) : G. L. Garnsey
- Tom Garrett (1876–77 to 1897–98) : T. W. Garrett
- Alfred Geary (1877–78 to 1882–83) : A. Geary
- Daniel Gee (1903–04 to 1913–14) : D. A. Gee
- Greg Geise (1983–84 to 1984–85) : G. G. Geise
- Kevin Geyer (1997–98 to 1998–99) : K. J. Geyer
- Ryan Gibson (2016–17 to date) : R. J. Gibson
- Dave Gilbert (1983–84 to 1987–88) : D. R. Gilbert
- George Gilbert (1855–56 to 1874–75) : G. H. B. Gilbert
- Adam Gilchrist (1992–93 to 1993–94) : A. C. Gilchrist
- Francis Gilmore (1938–39 to 1939–40) : F. P. J. Gilmore
- Gary Gilmour (1971–72 to 1979–80) : G. J. Gilmour
- Craig Glassock (1994–95 to 1997–98) : C. A. Glassock
- John Gleeson (1966–67 to 1972–73) : J. W. Gleeson
- Harry Goddard (1905–06 to 1910–11) : H. Goddard
- Gordon Goffet (1965–66 to 1968–69) : G. Goffet
- Gamini Goonesena (1960–61 to 1963–64) : G. Goonesena
- Evan Gordon (1981–82 to 1982–83) : E. S. Gordon
- George Gordon (1866–67 to 1867–68) : G. H. Gordon
- Froggy Gorman (1862–63) : F. O. Gorman
- Charles Gorry (1907–08 to 1910–11) : C. R. Gorry
- Reginald Gostelow (1920–21 to 1924–25) : R. E. P. Gostelow
- John Gould (1891–92 to 1895–96) : J. W. Gould
- Freddy Gow (1909–10 to 1910–11) : F. K. Gow
- Paddy Gray (1922–23 to 1924–25) : A. T. Gray
- Toby Gray (2022–23 to present)
- Chris Green (2014–15 to 2016–17) : C. J. Green
- Randal Green (1990–91 to 1993–94) : R. J. Green
- Norman Gregg (1912–13 to 1914–15) : N. M. Gregg
- Arthur Gregory (1880–81 to 1888–89) : A. H. Gregory
- Charles Gregory (1870–71 to 1871–72) : C. S. Gregory
- Charles Gregory (1898–99 to 1907–08) : C. W. Gregory
- Dave Gregory (1866–67 to 1882–83) : D. W. Gregory
- Jack Gregory (1920–21 to 1928–29) : J. M. Gregory
- Ned Gregory (1862–63 to 1877–78) : E. J. Gregory
- Syd Gregory (1889–90 to 1911–12) : S. E. Gregory
- Ken Grieves (1945–46 to 1946–47) : K. J. Grieves
- George Griffiths (1962–63 to 1967–68) : G. E. Griffiths
- Tim Grosser (1968–69) : J. W. Grosser
- Bertie Grounds (1903–04 to 1905–06) : W. T. Grounds
- Kenneth Gulliver (1936–37 to 1945–46) : K. C. Gulliver
- Dick Guy (1960–61 to 1968–69) : R. H. Guy
- Les Gwynne (1924–25 to 1926–27) : L. W. Gwynne

== H ==
- Brad Haddin (1998–99 to 2014–15) : B. J. Haddin
- Richard Hall (1880–81 to 1883–84) : R. Hall
- Walter Hand (1871–72) : W. C. Hand
- David Hanlin (1948–49 to 1949–50) : D. W. Hanlin
- Roger Hartigan (1903–04) : M. J. Hartigan
- Thomas J. Hartigan (1907–08) : T. J. Hartigan
- George Harvey (1909–10 to 1911–12) : G. G. Harvey
- Ron Harvey (1956–57) : R. M. Harvey
- Neil Harvey (1958–59 to 1962–63) : R. N. Harvey
- Nathan Hauritz (2006–07 to 2011–12) : N. M. Hauritz
- Greg Hayne (1999–2000) : G. J. Hayne
- Martin Haywood (1991–92 to 1996–97) : M. T. Haywood
- Josh Hazlewood (2008–09 to date) : J. R. Hazlewood
- Gerry Hazlitt (1911–12 to 1912–13) : G. R. Hazlitt
- Jamie Heath (1999–2000 to 2001–02) : J. M. Heath
- Frank Henderson (1928–29 to 1929–30) : F. Henderson
- Mike Hendricks (1969–70) : M. Hendricks
- Hunter Hendry (1918–19 to 1923–24) : H. S. T. L. Hendry
- Moisés Henriques (2006–07 to date) : M. C. Henriques
- Scott Henry (2011–12 to 2014–15) : S. O. Henry
- Richard Hewitt (1865–66 to 1872–73) : R. C. Hewitt
- Robert Hickson (1902–03 to 1907–08) : R. N. Hickson
- Hugh Hiddleston (1880–1881 to 1888–89) : H. C. S. Hiddleston
- Mark Higgs (1998–99 to 2001–02) : M. A. Higgs
- Andrew Hilditch (1976–77 to 1980–81) : A. M. J. Hilditch
- Clement Hill (1932–33 to 1934–35) : C. J. Hill
- Michael Hill (1964–65 to 1974–75) : K. M. Hill
- Stanley Hill (1912–13) : S. Hill
- Harry Hilliard (1855–56 to 1859–60) : H. Hilliard
- Sid Hird (1931–32 to 1932–33) : S. F. Hird
- John Hodgkinson (1908–09 to 1909–10) : J. E. Hodgkinson
- Mick Hogg (1928–29) : G. C. H. Hogg
- James Hogg (1926–27 to 1929–30) : J. E. P. Hogg
- Thomas Hogue (1901––03) : T. H. Hogue
- Wayne Holdsworth (1988–89 to 1996–97) : W. J. Holdsworth
- Graeme Hole (1949–50) : G. B. Hole
- Bob Holland (1978–79 to 1986–87) : R. G. Holland
- Hal Hooker (1924–25 to 1931–32) : J. E. H. Hooker
- Scott Hookey (1987–88 to 1994–95) : S. G. Hookey
- Bert Hopkins (1896–97 to 1914–15) : A. J. Y. Hopkins
- Herbert Hordern (1905–06 to 1912–13) : H. V. Hordern
- Gordon Horsfield (1934–35 to 1941–42) : G. C. Horsfield
- Dan Horsley (2000–01) : D. A. Horsley
- David Hourn (1970–71 to 1981–82) : D. W. Hourn
- Thomas Howard (1899–1900 to 1902–03) : T. H. Howard
- George Howell (1855–56 to 1858–59) : G. Howell
- William Howell (1932–33 to 1935–36) : W. H. Howell
- Bill Howell (1894–95 to 1904–05) : W. P. Howell
- Daniel Hughes (2012–13 to date) : D. P. Hughes
- Graeme Hughes (1975–76 to 1978–79) : G. C. Hughes
- Phillip Hughes (2007–08 to 2011–12) : P. J. Hughes
- Ernest Hume (1895–96) : A. E. Hume
- John Humphreys (1875–76) : J. Humphreys
- Bill Hunt (1929–30 to 1931–32) : W. A. Hunt
- Bob Hynes (1935–36 to 1938–39) : L. C. Hynes

== I ==
- Thomas Iceton (1877–78) : T. H. Iceton
- Imran Khan (1984–85) : Imran Khan
- Frank Iredale (1888–89 to 1901–02) : F. A. Iredale
- William Ives (1919–20 to 1921–22) : W. F. Ives

== J ==
- Archie Jackson (1926–27 to 1930–31) : A. Jackson
- Patrick Jackson (2014–15) : P. Jackson
- Vic Jackson (1936–37 to 1940–41) : V. E. Jackson
- Ron James (1938–39 to 1950–51) : R. V. James
- Ernest Jansan (1899–1900 to 1903–04) : E. W. Jansan
- Phil Jaques (2000–01 to 2011–12) : P. A. Jaques
- Robert Jeffery (1978–79) : R. F. Jeffery
- Arthur Jeffreys (1872–73) : A. F. Jeffreys
- Andrew Johns (2006–07) : A. G. Johns
- Francis Johnson (1903–04 to 1908–09) : F. B. Johnson
- Aubrey Johnston (1904–05) : A. E. Johnston
- Clive Johnston (1949–50 to 1957–58) : C. W. Johnston
- David Johnston (1977–78 to 1981–82) : D. A. H. Johnston
- Trent Johnston (1998–99 to 1999–2000) : D. T. Johnston
- Fred Johnston (1946–47 to 1950–51) : F. B. Johnston
- Neil Jones (1994–95 to 1996–97) : N. R. Jones
- Andrew Jones (1987–88 to 1988–89) : R. A. Jones
- Sidney Jones (1862–63 to 1869–70) : S. Jones
- Sammy Jones (1880–81 to 1894–95) : S. P. Jones
- Frank Jordan (1927–28 to 1928–29) : F. S. Jordan
- Joel Joseph (1889–90) : J. P. Joseph

== K ==
- Simon Katich (2002–03 to 2011–12) : S. M. Katich
- Simon Keen (2008–09 to 2009–10) : S. J. C. Keen
- Charlie Kelleway (1907–08 to 1928–29) : C. Kelleway
- Charles Kellick (1865–66 to 1872–73) : C. M. Kellick
- James Kellick (1868–69) : J. Kellick
- James Kelly (1894–95 to 1904–05) : J. J. Kelly
- Peter Kelly (1962–63) : P. C. Kelly
- Justin Kenny (1988–89 to 1990–91) : J. D. Kenny
- Alexander Kermode (1901–02) : A. Kermode
- Anthony Kershler (1994–95 to 1995–96) : A. J. Kershler
- John Kettle (1859–60 to 1861–62) : J. L. Kettle
- Percy King (1919–20) : P. M. King
- John Kinloch (1858–59 to 1861–62) : J. Kinloch
- Alan Kippax (1918–19 to 1935–36) : A. F. Kippax
- Ronald Kissell (1946–47 to 1951–52) : R. K. Kissell
- Jason Krejza (2004–05 to 2006–07) : J. J. Krejza

== L ==
- Josh Lalor (2011–12 to 2015–16) : J. K. Lalor
- Grant Lambert (2001–02 to 2009–10) : G. M. Lambert
- Ossie Lambert (1950–51 to 1956–57) : O. Lambert
- William Lampe (1927–28 to 1928–29) : W. H. W. Lampe
- Paddy Lane (1907–08 to 1912–13) : J. B. Lane
- Tim Lang (2006–07) : T. E. Lang
- Nick Larkin (2014–15 to date) : N. C. R. Larkin
- Charles Lawes (1924–25) : C. H. W. Lawes
- Charles Lawrence (1862–63 to 1869–70) : C. Lawrence
- Geoff Lawson (1977–78 to 1991–92) : G. F. Lawson
- Leonard Leabeater (1929–30 to 1931–32) : L. R. Leabeater
- Brett Lee (1997–98 to 2010–11) : B. Lee
- Shane Lee (1992–93 to 2001–02) : S. Lee
- Terry Lee (1962–63 to 1967–68) : T. H. Lee
- Jay Lenton (2015–16) : J. S. Lenton
- Peter Leslie (1965–66 to 1968–69) : P. G. Leslie
- Oswald Lewis (1856–57 to 1860–61) : O. H. Lewis
- Thomas Lewis (1856–57 to 1859–60) : T. H. Lewis
- Ray Lindwall (1941–42 to 1953–54) : R. R. Lindwall
- Ray Little (1934–35 to 1935–36) : R. C. J. Little
- Bruce Livingston (1956–57) : B. A. L. Livingston
- Jock Livingston (1941–42 to 1946–47) : L. Livingston
- Roy Loder (1926–27 to 1928–29) : R. R. Loder
- Roy Lonergan (1935–36) : A. R. Lonergan
- Edmund Long (1911–12) : E. J. Long
- William Lough (1906–07) : W. D. Lough
- Hammy Love (1920–21 to 1932–33) : H. S. B. Love
- Walter Loveridge (1902–03) : W. D. Loveridge
- Eric Lukeman (1946–47 to 1949–50) : E. W. Lukeman
- Ginty Lush (1933–34 to 1946–47) : J. G. Lush
- Nathan Lyon (2013–14 to date) : N. M. Lyon

== M ==
- Charlie Macartney (1905–06 to 1926–27) : C. G. Macartney
- Stuart MacGill (1996–97 to 2007–08) : S. C. G. MacGill
- Sunny Jim Mackay (1902–03 to 1905–06) : J. R. M. Mackay
- Kerry Mackay (1970–71 to 1974–75) : K. Mackay
- Alick Mackenzie (1888–89 to 1906–07) : A. C. K. Mackenzie
- William Macnish (1862–63) : W. G. Macnish
- Herbert MacPherson (1893–94 to 1894–95) : H. J. K. MacPherson
- Bobby Madden (1949–50 to 1959–60) : R. H. Madden
- Nic Maddinson (2010–11 to date) : N. J. Maddinson
- Greg Mail (1999–2000 to 2008–09) : G. J. Mail
- Arthur Mailey (1912–13 to 1929–30) : A. A. Mailey
- Frederick Mair (1933–34 to 1937–38) : F. Mair
- William Makin (1910–11) : W. Makin
- Peter Maloney (1976–77) : P. I. Maloney
- Manjot Singh (2013–14) : Manjot Singh
- Hugh Marjoribanks (1958–59) : H. L. Marjoribanks
- Alec Marks (1928–29 to 1936–37) : A. E. Marks
- Lynn Marks (1962–63 to 1968–69) : L. A. Marks
- Neil Marks (1958–59 to 1959–60) : N. G. Marks
- Phil Marks (1983–84 to 1989–90) : P. H. Marks
- Alfred Marr (1882–83 to 1890–91) : A. P. Marr
- Jack Marsh (1900–01 to 1902–03) : J. Marsh
- Hugh Martin (1971–72) : H. Martin
- John Martin (1966–67 to 1969–70) : J. F. Martin
- Johnny Martin (1956–57 to 1967–68) : J. W. Martin
- Hugh Massie (1877–78 to 1887–88) : H. H. Massie
- Jack Massie (1910–11 to 1913–14) : R. J. A. Massie
- Adam Mather (1885–86 to 1886–87) : A. Mather
- Greg Matthews (1982–83 to 1997–98) : G. R. J. Matthews
- Neil Maxwell (1993–94 to 1995–96) : N. D. Maxwell
- Alexander Mayes (1924–25) : Alexander Dunbar Aitken Mayes
- Arthur McBeath (1899–1900 to 1903–04) : A. McBeath
- Stan McCabe (1928–29 to 1941–42) : S. J. McCabe
- Victor McCaffery (1938–39) : V. W. McCaffery
- Bede McCauley (1937–38 to 1938–39) : B. V. McCauley
- William McCloy (1918–19) : W. S. S. McCloy
- Colin McCool (1939–40 to 1940–41) : C. L. McCool
- Rick McCosker (1973–74 to 1983–84) : R. B. McCosker
- Barney McCoy (1920–21 to 1923–24) : B. L. McCoy
- Brendon McCullum (2008–09) : B. B. McCullum
- Percy McDonnell (1885–86 to 1891–92) : P. S. McDonnell
- Eric McElhone (1910–11 to 1911–12) : F. E. McElhone
- Alan McGilvray (1933–34 to 1936–37) : A. D. McGilvray
- Wally McGlinchey (1885–86 to 1892–93) : W. W. McGlinchey
- Glenn McGrath (1992–93 to 2007–08) : G. D. McGrath
- Harold McGuirk (1926–27) : H. V. McGuirk
- Leo McGuirk (1930–31) : L. D. McGuirk
- William McIntyre (1905–06 to 1906–07) : W. R. McIntyre
- Cecil McKew (1911–12 to 1913–14) : C. G. McKew
- Tom McKibbin (1894–95 to 1898–99) : T. R. McKibbin
- John McKone (1855–56 to 1857–58) : J. J. McKone
- Greg McLay (1990–91) : G. F. McLay
- Brad McNamara (1989–90 to 1999–2000) : B. E. McNamara
- Ray McNamee (1926–27 to 1928–29) : R. L. A. McNamee
- Keith McPhillamy (1904–05) : K. McPhillamy
- Frederick Middleton (1905–06 to 1909–10) : F. S. Middleton
- David Miller (1893–94) : D. L. Miller
- Keith Miller (1947–48 to 1955–56) : K. R. Miller
- Noel Miller (1935–36) : N. K. Miller
- Geoff Milliken (1989–90 to 1991–92) : G. S. Milliken
- John Mills (1857–58) : J. Mills
- Leslie Minnett (1907–08 to 1914–15) : L. A. Minnett
- Roy Minnett (1906–07 to 1914–15) : R. B. Minnett
- Rupert Minnett (1909–10 to 1914–15) : R. V. Minnett
- James Minter (1938–39) : E. J. Minter
- Frank Misson (1958–59 to 1963–64) : F. M. Misson
- David Moore (1986–87) : D. J. A. Moore
- George Moore (1870–71 to 1872–73) : G. Moore
- Stanley Moore (1912–13) : G. S. Moore
- Jemmy Moore (1861–62) : J. Moore
- Leon Moore (1892–93 to 1894–95) : L. D. Moore
- Bill Moore (1893–94) : W. H. Moore
- Ian Moran (2005–06) : I. A. Moran
- George Morgan (1874–75) : G. Morgan
- Gordon Morgan (1921–22 to 1928–29) : J. G. Morgan
- Jack Moroney (1945–46 to 1951–52) : J. Moroney
- Arthur Morris (1940–41 to 1954–55) : A. R. Morris
- John Morris (1858–59) : J. H. Morris
- Norman Morris (1928–29) : N. O. Morris
- Charles Morrissey (1924–25 to 1925–26) : C. V. Morrissey
- Henry Moses (1881–82 to 1894–95) : H. Moses
- Ron Moss (1948–49) : R. B. Moss
- Harold Mudge (1935–36 to 1939–40) : H. Mudge
- Wayne Mulherin (1983–84) : W. M. Mulherin
- Des Mullarkey (1923–24) : D. A. Mullarkey
- Arthur Munn (1912–13 to 1913–14) : A. R. Munn
- Billy Murdoch (1875–76 to 1893–94) : W. L. Murdoch
- James Murphy (1933–34 to 1938–39) : J. J. Murphy
- Richard Murray (1855–56 to 1859–60) : R. Murray

== N ==
- Arjun Nair (2015–16 to date) : A. J. Nair
- Don Nash (1999–2000 to 2003–04) : D. A. Nash
- Peter Nevill (2008–09 to date) : P. M. Nevill
- Henry Newcombe (1860–61 to 1862–63) : H. C. E. Newcombe
- Andrew Newell (1889–90 to 1899–1900) : A. L. Newell
- Percy Newton (1907–08) : P. A. Newton
- Charles Nicholls (1926–27 to 1928–29) : C. O. Nicholls
- Arthur Nichols (1908–09) : A. J. Nichols
- Matthew Nicholson (2003–04 to 2007–08) : M. J. Nicholson
- Steve Nikitaras (1996–97) : S. Nikitaras
- Ted Noble (1893–94) : E. G. Noble
- Monty Noble (1893–94 to 1919–20) : M. A. Noble
- David Noonan (1895–96) : D. J. Noonan
- Rex Norman (1918–19 to 1919–20) : H. R. C. Norman
- Otto Nothling (1922–23 to 1924–25) : O. E. Nothling
- Thomas Nunn (1880–81 to 1884–85) : T. Nunn
- Richard Nutt (1931–32 to 1932–33) : R. N. Nutt

== O ==
- James Oatley (1865–66 to 1868–69) : J. N. Oatley
- Aaron O'Brien (2001–02 to 2007–08) : A. W. O'Brien
- Charles O'Brien (1945–46) : C. J. O'Brien
- Ernest O'Brien (1926–27 to 1927–28) : E. F. O'Brien
- Leslie O'Brien (1937–38 to 1938–39) : L. J. O'Brien
- Jack O'Connor (1904–05 to 1905–06) : J. D. A. O'Connor
- David Ogilvy (1885–86 to 1886–87) : D. S. Ogilvy
- William O'Hanlon (1884–85 to 1888–89) : W. J. O'Hanlon
- Steve O'Keefe (2005–06 to date) : S. N. J. O'Keefe
- Frank O'Keeffe (1919–20 to 1920–21) : F. A. O'Keeffe
- Kerry O'Keeffe (1968–69 to 1979–80) : K. J. O'Keeffe
- Bert Oldfield (1919–20 to 1937–38) : W. A. S. Oldfield
- Charles Oliver (1865–66 to 1872–73) : C. N. J. Oliver
- Mark O'Neill (1982–83 to 1990–91) : M. D. O'Neill
- Norm O'Neill (1955–56 to 1966–67) : N. C. L. O'Neill
- Jim O'Regan (1957–58) : J. B. O'Regan
- John O'Reilly (1953–54 to 1959–60) : J. W. O'Reilly
- Bill O'Reilly (1927–28 to 1945–46) : W. J. O'Reilly
- Robert Osborne (1924–25 to 1926–27) : R. H. Osborne
- Kerry Owen (1965–66) : K. A. Owen

== P ==
- James Packman (2004–05) : J. R. Packman
- Alfred Park (1861–62 to 1868–69) : A. L. Park
- Thomas Parsonage (1932–33) : T. G. Parsonage
- Len Pascoe (1974–75 to 1983–84) : L. S. Pascoe
- Charles Patrick (1893–94) : C. W. Patrick
- Kurtis Patterson (2011–12 to date) : K. R. Patterson
- Mark Patterson (1994–95 to 1995–96) : M. W. Patterson
- Mick Pawley (1969–70 to 1973–74) : M. B. Pawley
- Reginald Pearce (1952–53) : R. M. Pearce
- Percival Penman (1904–05 to 1905–06) : A. P. Penman
- Cec Pepper (1938–39 to 1940–41) : C. G. Pepper
- Jack Pettiford (1946–47 to 1947–48) : J. Pettiford
- Matthew Phelps (1998–99 to 2005–06) : M. J. Phelps
- Norbert Phillips (1922–23 to 1929–30) : N. E. Phillips
- Ray Phillips (1978–79) : R. B. Phillips
- Stephen Phillips (2005–06) : S. J. Phillips
- Peter Philpott (1954–55 to 1966–67) : P. I. Philpott
- Michael Pierce (1892–93 to 1893–94) : M. Pierce
- Nathan Pilon (2000–01 to 2003–04) : N. S. Pilon
- Colin Pinch (1949–50) : C. J. Pinch
- Walter Pite (1901–02 to 1914–15) : W. E. Pite
- William Pocock (1872–73) : W. J. Pocock
- Les Poidevin (1895–96 to 1904–05) : L. O. S. Poidevin
- Roland Pope (1884–85) : R. J. Pope
- George Powell (1941–42 to 1948–49) : G. Powell
- Jerry Powell (1872–73 to 1884–85) : T. Powell
- Bert Pratten (1913–14 to 1914–15) : H. G. Pratten
- Ward Prentice (1912–13 to 1920–21) : W. S. Prentice
- David Pryor (1895–96) : D. G. Pryor
- Austin Punch (1919–20 to 1928–29) : A. T. E. Punch
- Leslie Pye (1896–97 to 1905–06) : L. W. Pye

== Q ==
- Karl Quist (1899–1900) : K. H. Quist

== R ==
- James Randell (1909–10 to 1924–25) : J. A. Randell
- Andrew Ratcliffe (1913–14 to 1928–29) : A. T. Ratcliffe
- Mark Ray (1981–82) : M. Ray
- Sidney Redgrave (1904–05 to 1906–07) : J. S. Redgrave
- William Rees (1856–57) : W. G. Rees
- Douglas Reid (1908–09 to 1909–10) : D. C. Reid
- David Renneberg (1964–65 to 1970–71) : D. A. Renneberg
- Brian Rhodes (1971–72) : B. L. Rhodes
- Corey Richards (1995–96 to 2005–06) : C. J. Richards
- Charles Richardson (1886–87 to 1894–95) : C. A. Richardson
- George Richardson (1859–60 to 1860–61) : G. B. Richardson
- Len Richardson (1975–76) : L. M. Richardson
- William Richardson (1887–88 to 1895–96) : W. A. Richardson
- Frank Ridge (1895–96) : F. M. Ridge
- Steve Rixon (1974–75 to 1987–88) : S. J. Rixon
- Andy Roberts (1976–77) : A. M. E. Roberts
- Kevin Roberts (1994–95 to 1997–98) : K. J. Roberts
- William Roberts (1880–81) : W. Roberts
- Gavin Robertson (1987–88 to 1999–2000) : G. R. Robertson
- Henry Robinson (1889–90 to 1892–93) : H. J. W. Robinson
- Ray Robinson (1934–35 to 1939–40) : R. H. Robinson
- William Robison (1893–94) : W. C. Robison
- Owen Rock (1924–25 to 1925–26) : H. O. Rock
- Grant Roden (2005–06) : G. W. Roden
- John Rogers (1968–69 to 1969–70) : W. J. Rogers
- Ben Rohrer (2006–07 to 2016–17) : B. J. Rohrer
- Mick Roper (1939–40) : A. W. Roper
- Gordon Rorke (1957–58 to 1963–64) : G. F. Rorke
- Marshall Rosen (1971–72 to 1975–76) : M. F. Rosen
- Barry Rothwell (1963–64 to 1968–69) : B. A. Rothwell
- Raymond Rowe (1932–33 to 1933–34) : R. C. Rowe
- Greg Rowell (1989–90 to 1990–91) : G. J. Rowell
- Frank Rowland (1924–25) : F. W. Rowland
- Francis Rowley (1860–61 to 1861–62) : F. Rowley
- Robert Roxby (1953–54) : R. C. Roxby
- Graeme Rummans (1997–98 to 2001–02) : G. C. Rummans
- Barney Russell (1920–21 to 1921–22) : B. L. Russell
- Gregory Ryan (1934–35) : G. W. Ryan

== S ==
- Edward Saddler (1855––62) : E. Saddler
- Ron Saggers (1939–40 to 1950–51) : R. A. Saggers
- Andrew Sainsbury (1998–99) : A. J. Sainsbury
- Benjamin Salmon (1924–25 to 1931–32) : B. M. Salmon
- Edward Samuels (1859–60) : E. Samuels
- Gurinder Sandhu (2012–13 to date) : G. S. Sandhu
- Warren Saunders (1955–56 to 1964–65) : W. J. Saunders
- Harry Savage (1921–22) : H. M. Savage
- Albert Scanes (1921–22 to 1927–28) : A. E. Scanes
- Ted Scanlan (1877–78) : E. Scanlan
- John Scott (1908–09 to 1924–25) : J. D. Scott
- Barry Scott (1940–41) : R. B. Scott
- Wayne Seabrook (1984–85 to 1985–86) : W. J. S. Seabrook
- Edward Seale (1877–78 to 1878–79) : E. H. Seale
- James Searle (1888–89 to 1893–94) : J. Searle
- Dudley Seddon (1926–27 to 1928–29) : C. D. Seddon
- Maurice Shea (1895–96) : M. Shea
- James Shepherd (1889–90) : J. Shepherd
- Ned Sheridan (1867–68 to 1878–79) : E. O. Sheridan
- Bert Shortland (1911–12) : H. Shortland
- Arthur Simmons (1934–35) : A. H. Simmons
- Craig Simmons (2005–06 to 2006–07) : C. J. Simmons
- Charles Simpson (1909–10 to 1910–11) : C. E. Simpson
- Bob Simpson (1952–53 to 1977–78) : R. B. Simpson
- William Sinclair (1867–68) : W. F. Sinclair
- Clive Single (1912–13) : C. V. Single
- Stan Sismey (1938–39 to 1950–51) : S. G. Sismey
- John Skilbeck (1981–82 to 1982–83) : A. J. Skilbeck
- Michael Slater (1991–92 to 2003–04) : M. J. Slater
- Steve Small (1978–79 to 1992–93) : S. M. Small
- Daniel Smith (2004–05 to 2011–12) : D. L. R. Smith
- Dwayne Smith (2009–10) : D. R. Smith
- Graham Smith (1985–86 to 1989–90) : G. L. Smith
- James Smith (1909–10) : J. H. Smith
- Steven B. Smith (1981–82 to 1988–89) : S. B. Smith
- Steven P.D. Smith (2007–08 to date) : S. P. D. Smith
- Cyril Solomon (1931–32 to 1939–40) : C. M. Solomon
- William Somerville (2014–15 to date) : W. E. R. Somerville
- Fred Spofforth (1874–75 to 1884–85) : F. R. Spofforth
- Graham Spring (1982–83 to 1983–84) : G. A. Spring
- George Stack (1866–67 to 1868–69) : G. B. Stack
- Walter Stack (1909–10 to 1912–13) : W. J. Stack
- Harold Stapleton (1940–41) : H. V. Stapleton
- Mitchell Starc (2008–09 to date) : M. A. Starc
- Bob Steele (1926–27 to 1927–28) : H. C. Steele
- Tony Steele (1968–69 to 1970–71) : J. A. Steele
- Paul Stepto (1986–87) : P. D. Stepto
- John Stevens (1970–71) : J. G. Stevens
- Gordon Stewart (1930–31 to 1932–33) : G. L. Stewart
- Jamie Stewart (1999–2000 to 2000–01) : J. Stewart
- William Still (1856–57 to 1858–59) : W. C. Still
- Charlie Stobo (2016–17 to date) : C. H. Stobo
- Richard Stobo (1988–1989 to 1992–93) : R. M. Stobo
- Anthony Stuart (1994–95 to 1998–99) : A. M. Stuart
- Alfred Sullivan (1904–05 to 1906–07) : A. E. Sullivan
- James Suppel (1946–47) : J. T. Suppel

== T ==
- Brian Taber (1964–65 to 1973–74) : H. B. Taber
- David Taylor (1907–08) : D. Taylor
- Johnny Taylor (1913–14 to 1926–27) : J. M. Taylor
- Joseph Taylor (1911–12 to 1913–14) : J. S. Taylor
- Mark Taylor (1985–86 to 1998–99) : M. A. Taylor
- Peter Taylor (1985–86 to 1989–90) : P. L. Taylor
- Ross Taylor (1959–60) : R. S. Taylor
- Allen Thatcher (1920–21 to 1923–24) : A. N. Thatcher
- Henry Theak (1929–30 to 1934–35) : H. J. T. Theak
- Grahame Thomas (1957–58 to 1965–66) : G. Thomas
- Goldie Thomas (1909–10) : M. W. G. Thomas
- Carvick Thompson (1869–70) : C. D. Thompson
- Kerry Thompson (1977–78) : K. W. Thompson
- Scott Thompson (1993–94 to 2000–01) : S. M. Thompson
- Jeff Thomson (1972–73 to 1973–74) : J. R. Thomson
- Nat Thomson (1857–58 to 1879–80) : N. F. D. Thomson
- Dominic Thornely (2001–02 to 2010–11) : D. J. Thornely
- Edwin Tindall (1874–75 to 1880–81) : E. Tindall
- John Tooher (1875–76) : J. A. Tooher
- Peter Toohey (1974–75 to 1983–84) : P. M. Toohey
- Ernie Toshack (1945–46 to 1949–50) : E. R. H. Toshack
- Claude Tozer (1910–11 to 1919–20) : C. J. Tozer
- Jack Treanor (1954–55 to 1956–57) : J. C. Treanor
- Chris Tremain (2011–12 to 2012–13) : C. P. Tremain
- Ted Trenerry (1919–20 to 1920–21) : E. Trenerry
- Bill Trenerry (1920–21 to 1924–25) : W. L. Trenerry
- Geoffrey Trueman (1951–52 to 1953–54) : G. S. Trueman
- Victor Trumper (1894–95 to 1913–14) : V. T. Trumper
- Victor Trumper Jr (1940–41) : V. Trumper
- Adrian Tucker (1989–90 to 2003–04) : A. E. Tucker
- Darren Tucker (1989–90) : D. C. Tucker
- Rod Tucker (1985–86 to 1987–88) : R. J. Tucker
- William Tunks (1855–56) : W. Tunks
- Alan Turner (1968–69 to 1977–78) : A. Turner
- Charles Turner (1882–83 to 1909–10) : C. T. B. Turner
- Dale Turner (2001–02) : D. A. Turner
- Ernie Tweeddale (1925–26) : E. R. Tweeddale
- Twopenny (1869–70) : Twopenny

== U ==
- Param Uppal (2017–18) : P. Uppal
- Usman Khawaja (2007–08 to 2011–12) : Usman Khawaja

== V ==
- Brett van Deinsen (1999–2000 to 2001–02) : B. P. van Deinsen
- Timm van der Gugten (2011–12) : T. van der Gugten
- Leonard Vaughan (1925–26) : L. J. Vaughan
- Robert Vaughan (1855–56 to 1857–58) : R. Vaughan
- Bob Vidler (1977–78 to 1978–79) : R. T. Vidler

== W ==
- Mick Waddy (1902–03 to 1910–11) : E. F. Waddy
- Gar Waddy (1896–97 to 1920–21) : E. L. Waddy
- Frank Wade (1895–96) : F. H. Wade
- Ike Wales (1886–87 to 1893–94) : I. Wales
- Sydney Walford (1892–93 to 1895–96) : S. R. Walford
- Alan Walker (1948–49 to 1952–53) : A. K. Walker
- Lyall Wall (1914–15 to 1924–25) : J. C. L. S. Wall
- Walter Walmsley (1945–46) : W. T. Walmsley
- Jack Walsh (1939–40) : J. E. Walsh
- Francis Walters (1895–96) : F. H. Walters
- Doug Walters (1962–63 to 1980–81) : K. D. Walters
- Edward Ward (1856–57 to 1861–62) : E. W. Ward
- Maxwell Ward (1936–37) : M. J. Ward
- David Warner (2006–07 to date) : D. A. Warner
- John Watkins (1971–72 to 1972–73) : J. R. Watkins
- Bertie Watson (1927–28) : B. F. Watson
- Graeme Watson (1976–77) : G. D. Watson
- Greg Watson (1977–78 to 1978–79) : G. G. Watson
- Shane Watson (2010–11 to 2015–16) : S. R. Watson
- William Watson (1910–11) : W. Watson
- Bill Watson (1953–54 to 1960–61) : W. J. Watson
- Dean Waugh (1995–96 to 1996–97) : D. P. Waugh
- Mark Waugh (1985–86 to 2003–04) : M. E. Waugh
- Russell Waugh (1960–61) : R. F. Waugh
- Steve Waugh (1984–85 to 2003–04) : S. R. Waugh
- Stewart Wearne (1880–81 to 1887–88) : W. S. Wearne
- Stuart Webster (1972–73 to 1977–78) : S. E. Webster
- Dirk Wellham (1980–81 to 1987–88) : D. M. Wellham
- Wally Wellham (1959–60) : W. A. Wellham
- Arthur Wells (1920–21 to 1924–25) : A. P. Wells
- Harry Whiddon (1907–08) : H. Whiddon
- Alfred White (1905–06 to 1908–09) : A. B. S. White
- Jim White (1925–26) : A. H. E. White
- Ted White (1934–35 to 1938–39) : E. C. S. White
- Steve Whitfield (1988–89) : S. B. J. Whitfield
- Albert Whiting (1886–87) : A. W. H. Whiting
- Mike Whitney (1980–81 to 1993–94) : M. R. Whitney
- William Whitting (1905–06) : W. C. Whitting
- Bill Whitty (1907–08) : W. J. Whitty
- Vaughan Williams (2001–02) : V. M. Williams
- Joseph Wilson (1891–92) : J. C. Wilson
- John Wilson (1968–69 to 1971–72) : J. W. Wilson
- John Wood (1887–88) : J. R. Wood
- William Wood (1874–75) : W. Wood
- Gordon Woolmer (1945–46) : G. R. Woolmer
- Charles Wordsworth (1907–08) : C. W. Wordsworth
- Alan Wyatt (1956–57 to 1958–59) : A. E. Wyatt

== Y ==
- Walter Yeates (1949–50) : G. W. C. Yeates
- George Youill (1889–90 to 1895–96) : G. J. Youill
- Jason Young (1994–95) : J. C. Young

== Z ==
- Liam Zammit (2003–04) : L. A. Zammit
- Adam Zampa (2012–13) : A. Zampa
