= McGuirk =

McGuirk is a surname. Notable people with the surname include:

- Ambrose McGuirk, the first owner of the Milwaukee Badgers of the National Football League
- Bernard McGuirk (1957–2022), the executive producer of the Imus in the Morning radio program
- Harold McGuirk (1906–1984), Australian cricketer
- John McGuirk (born 1984), Irish writer and political commentator
- Leo McGuirk (1908–1973), Australian cricketer
- Leroy McGuirk (1910–1988), American wrestler and professional wrestling promoter
- Mike McGuirk (born 1958), American professional wrestling personality
- Paddy McGuirk (born 1950), Irish former golfer
- Patrick McGuirk (born 1967), American football player
- Terry McGuirk, chairman of Major League Baseball's Atlanta Braves
- Tom McGuirk (born 1971), retired Irish athlete who specialised in the 400 metres hurdles
- Warren P. McGuirk (1906–1981), Director of Athletics at the University of Massachusetts Amherst

== See also ==
- McGuirk Arena, multi-purpose arena in Mount Pleasant, Michigan, United States
- Warren McGuirk Alumni Stadium, 17,000-seat multi-purpose stadium in Hadley, Massachusetts on the university campus
- McGirk (disambiguation)
