= Max Ward =

Max or Maxwell Ward may refer to:

- Max Ward (aviator), Canadian aviator and founder of Wardair air lines
- Max Ward (drummer), American drummer and founder of 625 Thrashcore Records
- Maxwell Ward, 6th Viscount Bangor, Irish peer and politician
- Maxwell Ward (cricketer), Australian cricketer
- Maxwell Ward (contestant), Big Brother contestant
