= Peter Maloney =

Peter Maloney may refer to:

- Peter Maloney (politician), Canadian politician
- Peter Maloney (actor) (born 1944), American actor
- Peter Maloney (cricketer) (born 1950), Australian cricketer

== See also ==
- Peter Maloni (born 1964), Australian rules footballer
