= Mullarkey =

Mullarkey is a surname, the Anglicised form of the Gaelic Ó Maoilearca, meaning 'descendant of the devotee of Saint Earc'. Notable people with the surname include:

- Des Mullarkey (1899–1975), Australian cricketer
- John Mullarkey, professor in film and television
- Kelvin Mullarkey (1951–2018), British speedway rider
- Mary Mullarkey (1943–2021), American judge
- Melanius Mullarkey, Saint Lucian footballer
- Neil Mullarkey (born 1961), English actor, writer and comedian
- Rory Mullarkey (born 1987), Canadian playwright and librettist
- Sam Mullarkey (born 1987), English former professional footballer
