= Robert Brewster =

Robert Brewster may refer to:

- Robert Brewster (American football) (born 1986), American football player
- Robert Brewster (cricketer) (1867–1962), Australian cricketer
- Robert Brewster (Roundhead) (1599–1663), English politician
- Robert C. Brewster (1921–2009), American ambassador
- Lieutenant General Robert Brewster, fictional character in Terminator 3: Rise of the Machines

== See also ==
- Robert Brewster Stanton (1846–1922), American engineer
- Robert Brewer (American football), active 1981–1982
