= Camphin =

Camphin may refer to:

== Places ==
- Camphin-en-Carembault, a commune in the Nord department, France
- Camphin-en-Pévèle, a commune in the Nord department, France

== People ==
- William Camphin (1867–1942), Australian cricketer
