= Neil Jones =

Neil or Neal Jones may refer to:

- Neal Jones (born 1960), American actor
- Neil R. Jones (1909–1988), American author
- Neil Jones (cricketer) (born 1966), Australian cricketer
- Neil Jones (footballer) (born 1982), football coach and former New Zealand international footballer
- Neil Jones (academic), English legal historian at the University of Cambridge
- Neil D. Jones (born 1941), American computer scientist at the University of Copenhagen
- Neil Jones (screenwriter), co-creator of the 2011 TV series Bedlam
- Neil Jones (dancer) (born 1982), British professional dancer on Strictly Come Dancing
- Neil Jones, a minor character in True Blood
