= Vaughan Williams (surname) =

Vaughan Williams is a surname of Welsh origin. The best-known person with that surname, often referred to by it alone, is the English composer Ralph Vaughan Williams (1872–1958).

Other people named Vaughan Williams include:

- Edward Vaughan Williams (1797–1875), English judge, grandfather of Ralph Vaughan Williams
- Roland Vaughan Williams (1838–1916), English judge, uncle of Ralph Vaughan Williams
- Ursula Vaughan Williams (1911–2007), English poet and author, wife of Ralph Vaughan Williams
- Miles Vaughan Williams (1918–2016), English pharmacologist
- Bernard Vaughan Williams (1932–?), former Head of Housing Department in British Hong Kong

== See also ==
- Singh Vaughan Williams classification, of pharmaceuticals which are antiarrhythmic agents
- Vaughan Williams (cricketer) (born 1977), Australian cricketer
- Vaughan Williams and Tavener, a studio album by Nicola Benedetti
- Vaughan Williams Memorial Library, the library and archive of the English Folk Dance and Song Society
