= Richard Bryant =

Richard Bryant may refer to:

- Richard Bryant (actor) (born 1984), American actor who has appeared in Army Wives
- Richard Bryant (New South Wales cricketer) (1847–1931), Australian cricketer
- Richard Bryant (Western Australia cricketer) (1904–1989), Australian cricketer
- Richard Bryant (photographer) (born 1947), British architectural photographer
- Richard Bryant (musician), formerly of The Doobie Brothers and Little River Band
- Rick Bryant (1948–2019), New Zealand blues singer/songwriter
- Richard Bryant (psychologist) (born 1960), Australian medical scientist
