= Pite =

Pite may refer to:

- Piteå, town in Sweden known as Pite in local dialect
- Pite (food), Albanian foodstuff
- Pite River, Swedish river

== People with the surname ==
- Arthur Beresford Pite (1861–1934), British architect
- Crystal Pite (born 1970), Canadian dancer and choreographer
- Pité (born 1994), Portuguese footballer
- Richard Pite (active from 1982), British musician and jazz historian
- Walter Pite (1876–1955), Australian cricketer

== Others ==
- Pite Sámi, a Sámi language traditionally spoken in Sweden
