= William Still (disambiguation) =

William Still (1821–1902) was an abolitionist and member of the Pennsylvania Anti-Slavery Society.

William Still may also refer to:

- William Grant Still (1895–1978), American composer
- William Joseph Still (1870–????), English engineer
- William N. Still Jr. (1932–2023), American maritime historian
- William Still (cricketer) (c. 1820–1910), Australian cricketer
- Will Still (born 1992), Belgian professional football manager
