= Raymond Rowe (disambiguation) =

Erik (wrestler) (born 1984) is an American professional wrestler formerly known as Raymond Rowe.

Ray or Raymond Rowe may also refer to:

- Ray Rowe (American football) (born 1969), American football player
- Raymond Rowe (cricketer) (1913–1995), Australian cricketer
