= Robert Fairweather =

Robert Fairweather may refer to:

- Robert Fairweather (cricketer) (1845–1925), Australian cricketer
- Gordon Fairweather (1923–2008), Canadian politician
- Rob Fairweather, American Acting Director of the Office of Management and Budget
