= Ron James =

Ron James may refer to:

- Ron James (comedian) (born 1958), Canadian stand-up comedian and actor
- Ron James (cricketer) (1920–1983), Australian cricketer
- Ron James (footballer, born 1907) (1907–1969), Australian rules footballer
- Ron James (footballer, born 1933), Australian rules footballer
- Ron James (footballer, born 1970) (1970–1990), Australian rules footballer
- Ron James (mayor) (1928–2025), American politician, first directly elected mayor of San Jose, California
- Ron James (mountaineer), British mountain climber
- Po James (Ronald James, born 1949), American football running back
- Ron James (politician), former member of the Ohio House of Representatives
- Ronald James (rugby) (born 1938), Welsh rugby union and rugby league player
- Ronald J. James, United States lawyer and government official
- Ronnie James (1917–1977), Welsh boxer of the 1930s and 1940s
- Ron James (American football) (born 1964), American football coach
- Ron James, a character first appeared in the episode "Wizards Only, Fools" of the animated series Adventure Time
- Ronald M. James, American folklorist and historian
