= William O'Hanlon =

Australian cricketer

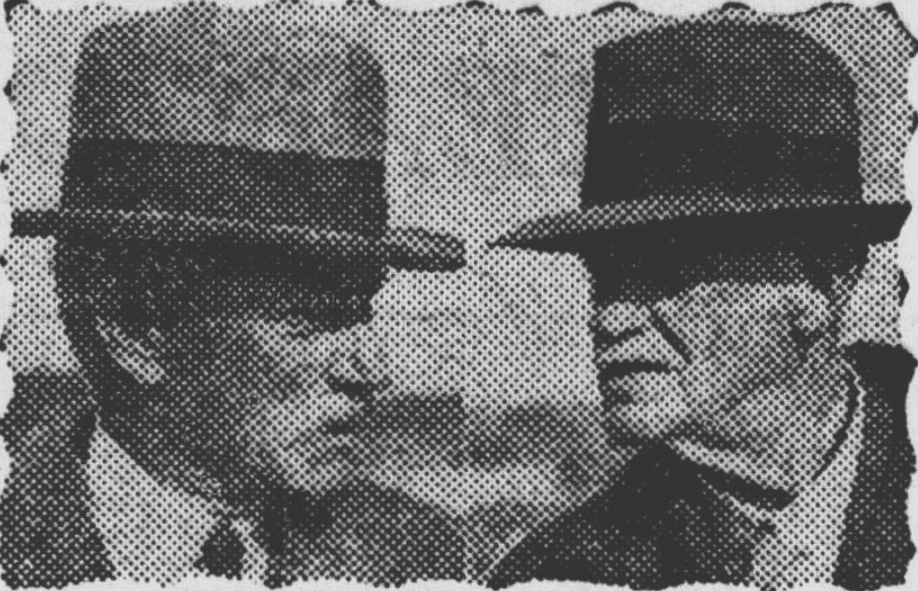
- Hanlon (right) with Charles Bannerman at the funeral of Syd Gregory, 1929.

Personal information
- Born: 10 March 1863; Melbourne, Australia
- Died: 23 June 1940 (aged 77); Sydney, Australia
- Source: ESPNcricinfo, 12 January 2017

William O'Hanlon (10 March 1863 – 23 June 1940) was an Australian cricketer. He played four first-class matches for New South Wales between 1884/85 and 1888/89.

== See also ==
- List of New South Wales representative cricketers
