= William Whitting =

Australian cricketer

William Charles Whitting
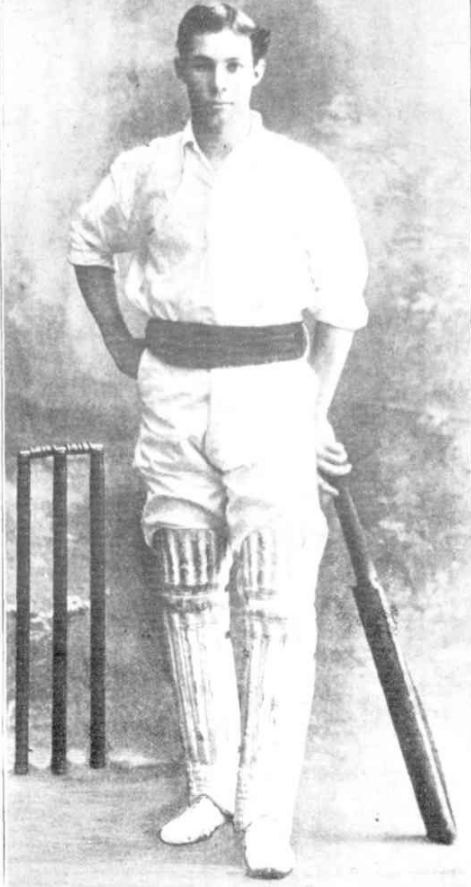

Personal information
- Born: 9 July 1884; Drummoyne, New South Wales, Australia
- Died: 26 October 1936 (aged 52); Sydney, Australia
- Source: ESPNcricinfo, 8 February 2017

William Charles Whitting (9 July 1884 – 26 October 1936) was an Australian cricketer. He played one first-class match for New South Wales in 1905/06.

== See also ==
- List of New South Wales representative cricketers
