= Vincent Collins =

Australian cricketer

Personal information
- Born: 23 September 1917; Sydney, Australia
- Died: 30 October 1989 (aged 72); Sunnybank, Queensland, Australia
- Source: ESPNcricinfo, 25 December 2016

Vincent Collins (23 September 1917 – 30 October 1989) was an Australian cricketer. He played two first-class matches for New South Wales between 1941/42 and 1947/48.

== See also ==
- List of New South Wales representative cricketers
