= Les Ellis =

Australian cricketer (born 1936)

Personal information
- Full name: Leslie George Ellis
- Born: 2 March 1936 (age 90); New Lambton, New South Wales, Australia
- Source: ESPNcricinfo, 26 December 2016

Les Ellis (born 2 March 1936) is an Australian cricketer. He played three first-class matches for New South Wales in 1964/65.

== See also ==
- List of New South Wales representative cricketers
