= Ron Briggs =

Australian cricketer

Personal information
- Born: 22 September 1929; Belmore, New South Wales, Australia
- Died: 10 October 2003 (aged 74); Katoomba, New South Wales, Australia
- Source: ESPNcricinfo, 23 December 2016

Ron Briggs (22 September 1929 – 10 October 2003) was an Australian cricketer. He played fifteen first-class matches for New South Wales between 1952/53 and 1954/55.

== See also ==
- List of New South Wales representative cricketers
