= Leonard Leabeater =

Australian cricketer

Personal information
- Born: 10 July 1906; Sydney, Australia
- Died: 1 June 1996 (aged 89); Newcastle, New South Wales, Australia
- Source: ESPNcricinfo, 4 January 2017

Leonard Leabeater (10 July 1906 – 1 June 1996) was an Australian cricketer. He played four first-class matches for New South Wales between 1929/30 and 1931/32.

== See also ==
- List of New South Wales representative cricketers
