= Eric Lukeman =

Australian cricketer

Personal information
- Born: 11 March 1923; Drummoyne, New South Wales, Australia
- Died: 18 April 1993 (aged 70); Palm Beach, Queensland, Australia
- Source: ESPNcricinfo, 5 January 2017

Eric Lukeman (11 March 1923 – 18 April 1993) was an Australian cricketer. He played sixteen first-class matches for New South Wales between 1946/47 and 1949/50.

== See also ==
- List of New South Wales representative cricketers
