= Edward Saddler =

Australian cricketer (died 1874)

Personal information
- Born: unknown
- Died: 28 October 1874
- Source: ESPNcricinfo, 25 January 2017

Edward Saddler (date of birth unknown, died 28 October 1874) was an Australian cricketer. He played three first-class matches for New South Wales between 1855/56 and 1861/62.

== See also ==
- List of New South Wales representative cricketers
