= Kevin Geyer =

Australian cricketer (born 1973)

Personal information
- Born: 11 October 1973 (age 53); Bathurst, New South Wales, Australia
- Source: ESPNcricinfo, 28 December 2016

Kevin Geyer (born 11 October 1973) is an Australian former cricketer. He played three first-class and six List A matches for New South Wales between 1997/98 and 1998/99.

== See also ==
- List of New South Wales representative cricketers
