= Percy King =

Australian cricketer

Personal information
- Born: 2 September 1889; Melbourne, Australia
- Died: 9 December 1967 (aged 78); Sydney, Australia
- Source: ESPNcricinfo, 3 January 2017

Percy King (2 September 1889 – 9 December 1967) was an Australian cricketer. He played one first-class match for New South Wales in 1919/20.

== See also ==
- List of New South Wales representative cricketers
