= Thomas Lewis (Australian cricketer) =

Australian cricketer

Personal information
- Born: 19 April 1829; Marylebone, England
- Died: 19 June 1901 (aged 72); Sydney, Australia
- Source: ESPNcricinfo, 5 January 2017

Thomas Lewis (19 April 1829 – 19 June 1901) was an Australian cricketer who played three first-class matches for New South Wales between 1856/57 and 1859/60 seasons.

== See also ==
- List of New South Wales representative cricketers
