= Ernie Tweeddale =

Australian cricketer

Personal information
- Born: 23 August 1895; Sydney, Australia
- Died: 28 May 1956 (aged 60); Dover Heights, New South Wales, Australia
- Source: ESPNcricinfo, 4 February 2017

Ernie Tweeddale (23 August 1895 – 28 May 1956) was an Australian cricketer. He played three first-class matches for New South Wales in 1925/26.

== See also ==
- List of New South Wales representative cricketers
