= Roy Loder =

Australian cricketer

Personal information
- Full name: Robert Roy Loder
- Born: 17 December 1896; East Maitland, New South Wales, Australia
- Died: 13 February 1964 (aged 67); Sydney, Australia
- Source: ESPNcricinfo, 5 January 2017

Roy Loder (17 December 1896 – 13 February 1964) was an Australian cricketer. He played two first-class matches for New South Wales between 1926/27 and 1928/29.

== See also ==
- List of New South Wales representative cricketers
