= James Oatley (cricketer) =

Australian cricketer

Personal information
- Born: 12 August 1845; Sydney, Australia
- Died: 17 December 1925 (aged 80); Sydney, Australia
- Source: ESPNcricinfo, 11 January 2017

James Oatley (12 August 1845 – 17 December 1925) was an Australian cricketer. He played two first-class matches for New South Wales between 1865/66 and 1868/69.

== See also ==
- List of New South Wales representative cricketers
