= Barney McCoy =

Australian cricketer

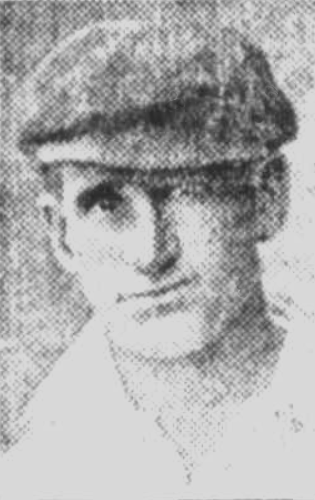

Personal information
- Born: 26 March 1896; Kangaroo Valley, New South Wales, Australia
- Died: 11 June 1970 (aged 74); Sydney, Australia
- Source: ESPNcricinfo, 8 January 2017

Barney McCoy (26 March 1896 – 11 June 1970) was an Australian cricketer. He played two first-class matches for New South Wales between 1920/21 and 1923/24. He also played for Balmain.

== See also ==
- List of New South Wales representative cricketers
