= Norman Ebsworth =

Australian cricketer

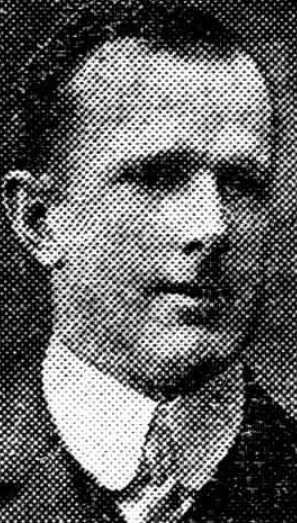

Personal information
- Born: 2 January 1878; Sydney, Australia
- Died: 19 November 1949 (aged 71); Kirribilli, New South Wales, Australia
- Source: ESPNcricinfo, 26 December 2016

Norman Ebsworth (2 January 1878 – 19 November 1949) was an Australian cricketer. He played three first-class matches for New South Wales in 1902/03.

== See also ==
- List of New South Wales representative cricketers
