= Francis Rowley =

Australian cricketer

Personal information
- Born: 27 September 1835; Sydney, Australia
- Died: 23 June 1862 (aged 26); Woolloomooloo, Australia
- Source: Cricinfo, 24 January 2017

Francis Rowley (27 September 1835 – 23 June 1862) was an Australian cricketer. He played two first-class matches for New South Wales between 1860/61 and 1861/62.

== See also ==
- List of New South Wales representative cricketers
