= Bill Donaldson (cricketer) =

Australian cricketer

Personal information
- Full name: William Peter James Donaldson
- Born: 26 October 1923; Sydney, Australia
- Died: 8 August 1999 (aged 75); Sydney, Australia
- Source: ESPNcricinfo, 26 December 2016

Bill Donaldson (26 October 1923 – 8 August 1999) was an Australian cricketer. He played twenty first-class matches for New South Wales between 1945/46 and 1949/50. He also played for Balmain Cricket Club, Randwick Cricket Club and Hireride.

== See also ==
- List of New South Wales representative cricketers
