= Frank Rowland (cricketer) =

Australian cricketer

Personal information
- Born: 1 March 1892; Inverell, New South Wales, Australia
- Died: 25 February 1957 (aged 64); Sydney, Australia
- Source: ESPNcricinfo, 24 January 2017

Frank Rowland (1 March 1892 – 25 February 1957) was an Australian cricketer. He played one first-class match for New South Wales in 1924/25.

== See also ==
- List of New South Wales representative cricketers
