= Leslie O'Brien (cricketer) =

Australian cricketer

Personal information
- Full name: John Leslie O'Brien
- Born: 8 April 1905; Sydney, Australia
- Died: 26 December 1967 (aged 62); Sydney, Australia
- Source: ESPNcricinfo, 12 January 2017

Leslie O'Brien (8 April 1905 – 26 December 1967) was an Australian cricketer. He played eight first-class matches for New South Wales during the 1937/38 and 1938/39 seasons.

== See also ==
- List of New South Wales representative cricketers
