= Frank Farrar (cricketer) =

Australian cricketer

Personal information
- Born: 29 March 1893; Rylstone, New South Wales, Australia
- Died: 30 May 1973 (aged 80); Waverley, New South Wales, Australia
- Source: ESPNcricinfo, 28 December 2016

Frank Farrar (29 March 1893 – 30 May 1973) was an Australian cricketer. He played two first-class matches for New South Wales in 1914/15. He was a right handed batter and his bowling was: Right-arm medium pace. His full name is Frank Martindale Farrar. He also played for the New South Wales Colt and Sydney University.

== See also ==
- List of New South Wales representative cricketers
