= Edward Berrie =

Australian cricketer

Personal information
- Born: 8 April 1884; Tomanbil, New South Wales
- Died: 8 December 1963 (aged 79); Tamworth, New South Wales, Australia
- Source: ESPNcricinfo, 22 December 2016

Edward Berrie (8 April 1884 – 8 December 1963) was an Australian cricketer. He played one first-class match for New South Wales in 1913/14.

== See also ==
- List of New South Wales representative cricketers
