= Walter Stack =

Australian cricketer

Personal information
- Born: 31 October 1884; Croydon, New South Wales, Australia
- Died: 26 March 1972 (aged 87); Bathurst, New South Wales, Australia
- Source: ESPNcricinfo, 2 February 2017

Walter Stack (31 October 1884 – 26 March 1972) was an Australian cricketer. He played seven first-class matches for New South Wales between 1909/10 and 1912/13.

== See also ==
- List of New South Wales representative cricketers
