= Ron Crippin =

Australian cricketer (born 1947)

Personal information
- Full name: Ronald James Crippin
- Born: 23 April 1947 (age 79); Sydney, Australia
- Source: ESPNcricinfo, 25 December 2016

Ron Crippin (born 23 April 1947) is an Australian cricketer. He played nineteen first-class and five List A matches for New South Wales between 1970/71 and 1978/79.

== See also ==
- List of New South Wales representative cricketers
