= John Kettle =

Australian cricketer

Personal information
- Born: 3 December 1830; Sydney, Australia
- Died: 30 October 1891 (aged 60); Newtown, New South Wales, Australia
- Source: ESPNcricinfo, 3 January 2017

John Kettle (3 December 1830 – 30 October 1891) was an Australian cricketer. He played three first-class matches for New South Wales between 1859/60 and 1861/62.

== See also ==
- List of New South Wales representative cricketers
