= George Stack (cricketer) =

Australian cricketer

Personal information
- Born: 12 March 1846; West Maitland, New South Wales, Australia
- Died: 7 October 1930 (aged 84); Orange, New South Wales, Australia
- Source: ESPNcricinfo, 2 February 2017

George Stack (12 March 1846 – 7 October 1930) was an Australian cricketer. He played two first-class matches for New South Wales between 1866/67 and 1868/69.

== See also ==
- List of New South Wales representative cricketers
