= Harry Dupain =

Australian cricketer

Personal information
- Born: 19 August 1889; Sydney, Australia
- Died: 29 September 1959 (aged 70); Burradoo, New South Wales, Australia
- Source: ESPNcricinfo, 26 December 2016

Harry Dupain (19 August 1889 – 29 September 1959) was an Australian cricketer. He played three first-class matches for New South Wales between 1927/28 and 1929/30.

== See also ==
- List of New South Wales representative cricketers
