= William Lough =

Australian cricketer

Personal information
- Born: 31 October 1886; Bourke, New South Wales, Australia
- Died: 1939 (aged 52–53); Sydney, Australia
- Source: ESPNcricinfo, 5 January 2017

William Lough (31 October 1886 – 1939) was an Australian cricketer. He played one first-class match for New South Wales in 1906/07.

== See also ==
- List of New South Wales representative cricketers
