= Harry Savage =

Australian cricketer

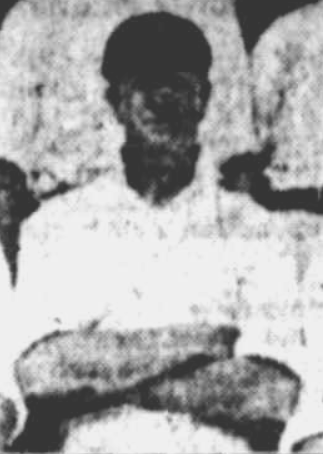

Personal information
- Born: 1 July 1887; Ermington, New South Wales, Australia
- Died: 14 November 1964 (aged 77); New South Wales, Australia
- Source: ESPNcricinfo, 31 January 2017

Harry Savage (1 July 1887 – 14 November 1964) was an Australian cricketer. He played one first-class match for New South Wales in 1921/22.

== See also ==
- List of New South Wales representative cricketers
