= Greg Geise =

Australian cricketer (born 1960)

Personal information
- Full name: Gregory Gordon Geise
- Born: 3 April 1960 (age 66); Wallsend, New South Wales, Australia
- Source: ESPNcricinfo, 28 December 2016

Greg Geise (born 3 April 1960) is an Australian cricketer. He played eight first-class and two List A matches for New South Wales between 1983/84 and 1984/85.

Geise was recognised for his achievements in cricket by the NDCA with aLife Membership in 2013.

== See also ==
- List of New South Wales representative cricketers
