= Thomas Parsonage =

Australian cricketer

Personal information
- Born: 13 November 1910; Sydney, Australia
- Died: 3 February 1951 (aged 40); Sydney, Australia
- Source: ESPNcricinfo, 14 January 2017

Thomas Parsonage (13 November 1910 – 3 February 1951) was an Australian cricketer. He played one first-class match for New South Wales in 1932/33.

== See also ==
- List of New South Wales representative cricketers
