= Allen Thatcher =

Australian cricketer

Personal information
- Born: 17 April 1899; Sydney, Australia
- Died: 12 February 1932 (aged 32); Dulwich Hill, New South Wales, Australia
- Source: ESPNcricinfo, 3 February 2017

Allen Thatcher (17 April 1899 – 12 February 1932) was an Australian cricketer. He played three first-class matches for New South Wales between 1920/21 and 1923/24. He also played for Marrickville Cricket Club. He also played tennis.

== See also ==
- List of New South Wales representative cricketers
