= Harry Goddard =

Australian cricketer

Personal information
- Full name: Henry Goddard
- Born: 16 November 1885; Sydney, Australia
- Died: 13 May 1925 (aged 39); Maroubra, New South Wales, Australia
- Source: ESPNcricinfo, 30 December 2016

Harry Goddard (16 November 1885 – 13 May 1925) was an Australian cricketer. He played six first-class matches for New South Wales between 1905/06 and 1910/11.

== See also ==
- List of New South Wales representative cricketers
