= Leonard Vaughan =

Australian cricketer

Personal information
- Born: 16 March 1908; Sydney, Australia
- Died: 1960 (aged 51–52)
- Source: ESPNcricinfo, 5 February 2017

Leonard Vaughan (16 March 1908 – 1960) was an Australian cricketer. He played two first-class matches for New South Wales in 1925/26.

== See also ==
- List of New South Wales representative cricketers
