= John McKone =

Australian cricketer

Personal information
- Full name: John James McKone
- Born: 3 October 1835; Sydney, Australia
- Died: 7 August 1882 (aged 46); Sydney, Australia
- Batting: Right-handed
- Bowling: Underarm right-arm medium pace

Domestic team information
- Years: Team
- 1855/56 to 1857/58: New South Wales
- Source: ESPNcricinfo, 8 January 2017

John James McKone (3 October 1835 – 7 August 1882) was an Australian cricketer. He played three first-class matches for New South Wales between 1855/56 and 1857/58.

McKone played in New South Wales' first three first-class matches. In the first, in Melbourne in March 1856, he took 5 for 25 and 5 for 11 and scored 18 not out in the first innings. New South Wales won narrowly, and he was the equal top wicket-taker and equal highest run-scorer on either side.

McKone married Esther Holder in Sydney in December 1858. He was the publican of the Curriers' Arms Hotel in central Sydney, where he also lived. Esther died there in May 1880 after bearing a stillborn son a few days earlier. He died there aged 46 in August 1882.

== See also ==
- List of New South Wales representative cricketers
