= Reginald Gostelow =

Australian cricketer

Personal information
- Born: 26 July 1900; Sydney, Australia
- Died: 2 August 1984 (aged 84); Sydney, Australia
- Source: ESPNcricinfo, 30 December 2016

Reginald Gostelow (26 July 1900 – 2 August 1984) was an Australian cricketer. He played three first-class matches for New South Wales between 1920/21 and 1924/25.

== See also ==
- List of New South Wales representative cricketers
