= Thomas Foster (Australian cricketer) =

Australian cricketer

Personal information
- Born: 30 September 1883; Sydney, Australia
- Died: 27 June 1974 (aged 90); Sydney, Australia
- Source: ESPNcricinfo, 28 December 2016

Thomas Foster (30 September 1883 – 27 June 1974) was an Australian cricketer. He played one first-class match for New South Wales in 1903/04.

== See also ==
- List of New South Wales representative cricketers
