= Mick Hogg =

Australian cricketer

Personal information
- Full name: Geoffrey Charles Huxtable Hogg
- Born: 28 September 1909; Goulburn, New South Wales, Australia
- Died: 14 August 1959 (aged 49); Coorparoo, Queensland, Australia
- Source: ESPNcricinfo, 31 December 2016

Mick Hogg (28 September 1909 – 14 August 1959) was an Australian cricketer. He played one first-class match for New South Wales in 1928/29.

== See also ==
- List of New South Wales representative cricketers
