= Phil Marks =

Australian cricketer (born 1961)

Personal information
- Full name: Phillip Henry Marks
- Born: 13 April 1961 (age 65); Salisbury, Rhodesia
- Source: ESPNcricinfo, 7 January 2017

Phil Marks (born 13 April 1961) is an Australian cricketer. He played thirteen first-class and seven List A matches for New South Wales between 1983/84 and 1989/90.

== See also ==
- List of New South Wales representative cricketers
