= Trevor Boyd =

Australian cricketer (1944–2022)

Personal information
- Full name: Trevor Joseph Boyd
- Born: 22 October 1944; Nyngan, New South Wales, Australia
- Died: 19 March 2022 (aged 77)
- Batting: Right-handed

Domestic team information
- Years: Team
- 1966/67–1969/70: New South Wales
- Source: ESPNcricinfo, 23 December 2016

Trevor Joseph Boyd (22 October 1944 – 19 March 2022) was an Australian cricketer. He played four first-class matches for New South Wales between 1966/67 and 1969/70.

Boyd died in March 2022, at the age of 77.

== See also ==
- List of New South Wales representative cricketers
