= Walter Duff =

Australian cricketer

Personal information
- Born: 22 April 1876; Sydney, Australia
- Died: 11 November 1921 (aged 45); Sydney, Australia
- Source: ESPNcricinfo, 26 December 2016

Walter Duff (22 April 1876 – 11 November 1921) was an Australian cricketer. He played three first-class matches for New South Wales in 1902/03. In 1921, Duff died of complications from a broken leg during a cricket match.

== See also ==
- List of New South Wales representative cricketers
