= Edward Samuels =

Australian cricketer

Personal information
- Born: 25 May 1833; Sydney, Australia
- Source: Cricinfo, 31 January 2017

Edward Samuels (born 25 May 1833, date of death unknown) was an Australian cricketer. He played one first-class matches for New South Wales in 1859/60.

== See also ==
- List of New South Wales representative cricketers
