= Sidney Jones (cricketer) =

Australian cricketer

Personal information
- Full name: Sidney Jones
- Source: ESPNcricinfo, 2 January 2017

Sidney Jones was an Australian cricketer. He played three first-class matches for New South Wales between 1862/63 and 1869/70.

== See also ==
- List of New South Wales representative cricketers
