= Stewart Wearne =

Australian cricketer

Personal information
- Born: 21 March 1859 [[Liverpool, New South Wales}Liverpool]], Colony of New South Wales
- Died: 28 January 1929 (aged 69); Kalk Bay, Cape Province, South Africa
- Source: ESPNcricinfo, 6 February 2017

Stewart Wearne (21 March 1859 – 28 January 1929) was an Australian cricketer. He played three first-class matches for New South Wales between 1880/81 and 1887/88.

== See also ==
- List of New South Wales representative cricketers
