= Robert Osborne (New South Wales cricketer) =

Australian cricketer

Personal information
- Born: 4 February 1897; Sydney, Australia
- Died: 21 February 1975 (aged 78); Long Jetty, New South Wales, Australia
- Source: ESPNcricinfo, 13 January 2017

Robert Osborne (4 February 1897 – 21 February 1975) was an Australian cricketer. He played three first-class matches for New South Wales between 1924/25 and 1926/27.

== See also ==
- List of New South Wales representative cricketers
