= Kerry Mackay =

Australian cricketer (born 1949)

Personal information
- Born: 7 May 1949 (age 77); Brighton-Le-Sands, New South Wales, Australia
- Source: ESPNcricinfo, 6 January 2017

Kerry Mackay (born 7 May 1949) is an Australian cricketer. He played eighteen first-class matches for New South Wales between 1970/71 and 1974/75.

== See also ==
- List of New South Wales representative cricketers
