= Norman Cush =

Australian cricketer

Personal information
- Born: 4 October 1911; Sydney, Australia
- Died: 22 January 1983 (aged 71); Maroubra, New South Wales, Australia
- Source: ESPNcricinfo, 25 December 2016

Norman Cush (4 October 1911 – 22 January 1983) was an Australian cricketer. He played one first-class match for New South Wales in 1934/35.

== See also ==
- List of New South Wales representative cricketers
