= Rod Davison =

Australian cricketer (born 1969)

Personal information
- Full name: Rodney John Davison
- Born: 26 June 1969 (age 57); Sydney, Australia
- Source: ESPNcricinfo, 26 December 2016

Rod Davison (born 26 June 1969) is an Australian cricketer. He played 39 first-class matches for New South Wales between 1993/94 and 1999/00. Despite a 2000 move to Queensland to try to continue playing first-class cricket, he played no further domestic cricket.

== See also ==
- List of New South Wales representative cricketers
