= Daniel Gee =

Australian cricketer

Personal information
- Born: 30 December 1876; Sydney, Australia
- Died: 16 January 1947 (aged 70); Adelaide, Australia
- Source: ESPNcricinfo, 28 December 2016

Daniel Gee (30 December 1876 – 16 January 1947) was an Australian cricketer. He played two first-class matches for New South Wales between 1903/04 and 1913/14.

== See also ==
- List of New South Wales representative cricketers
