= Michael Hill (cricketer, born 1945) =

Australian cricketer (born 1945)

Personal information
- Born: 26 January 1945 (age 81); Merewether, New South Wales, Australia
- Source: ESPNcricinfo, 31 December 2016

Michael Hill (born 26 January 1945) is an Australian cricketer. He played fourteen first-class matches for New South Wales between 1964/65 and 1974/75.

== See also ==
- List of New South Wales representative cricketers
