= Gordon Goffet =

Australian cricketer

Personal information
- Born: 4 March 1941; Speers Point, New South Wales, Australia
- Died: 29 July 2004 (aged 63); Newcastle, New South Wales, Australia
- Source: ESPNcricinfo, 30 December 2016

Gordon Goffet (4 March 1941 – 29 July 2004) was an Australian cricketer. He played seventeen first-class matches for New South Wales between 1965/66 and 1968/69.

== See also ==
- List of New South Wales representative cricketers
