= Nathan Pilon =

Australian cricketer (born 1976)

Personal information
- Born: 27 October 1976 (age 50); Bulli, New South Wales, Australia

Domestic team information
- Years: Team
- 2006: Victoria
- Source: Cricinfo, 12 December 2015

Nathan Pilon (born 27 October 1976) is an Australian former cricketer. He played three first-class cricket matches for Victoria in 2006.

== See also ==
- List of Victoria first-class cricketers
- List of New South Wales representative cricketers
