= Froggy Gorman =

Australian cricketer

Personal information
- Full name: Frederick Owen Gorman
- Born: 15 February 1843; Sydney, Australia
- Died: 7 May 1905 (aged 62); Goldfield, Nevada, United States
- Source: ESPNcricinfo, 30 December 2016

Froggy Gorman (15 February 1843 – 7 May 1905) was an Australian cricketer. He played one first-class match for New South Wales in 1862/63.

== See also ==
- List of New South Wales representative cricketers
