= William Cullen (cricketer) =

New Zealand-born Australian cricketer

Personal information
- Born: 31 May 1887; Wellington, New Zealand
- Died: 7 May 1945 (aged 57); Sydney, Australia
- Source: ESPNcricinfo, 25 December 2016

William Cullen (31 May 1887 – 7 May 1945) was a New Zealand-born Australian cricketer. He played one first-class match for New South Wales in 1914/15.

== See also ==
- List of New South Wales representative cricketers
