= Sidney Bradridge =

Australian cricketer

John Sidney Bradridge
Personal information
- Born: 1 December 1831; Sydney, Australia
- Died: 14 July 1905 (aged 73); Dulwich Hill, New South Wales, Australia
- Source: ESPNcricinfo, 23 December 2016

Sidney Bradridge (1 December 1831 – 14 July 1905) was an Australian cricketer. He played one first-class match for New South Wales in 1855/56. In his career he was an architect as of the 1870s.

Bradridge was the son of William Bradridge, an architect who died in 1869. He played cricket for the Fitz Roys club in New South Wales from at least 1848 and was noted as one of their best bowlers, and in 1856 he was selected to represent New South Wales in the states first Intercolonial Cricket match against Victoria. As of 1893 he was among the only surviving members of the first New South Wales side and shared his recollections which included that one or two members of the side had cricketing shoes, the others had ordinary boots, others played only in socks, and one or two played in bare feet.

== See also ==
- List of New South Wales representative cricketers
