= Henry Newcombe (cricketer) =

Australian cricketer

Personal information
- Born: 1835; Sydney, Australia
- Died: 26 October 1908 (aged 72–73); Sydney, Australia
- Source: ESPNcricinfo, 11 January 2017

Henry Newcombe (1835 – 26 October 1908) was an Australian cricketer. He played three first-class matches for New South Wales between 1860/61 and 1862/63.

== See also ==
- List of New South Wales representative cricketers
