= William McIntyre (Australian cricketer) =

Australian cricketer

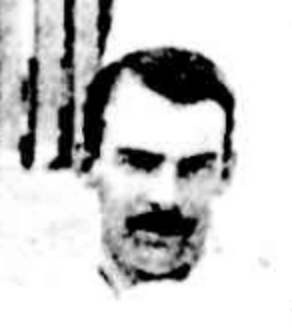

Personal information
- Born: 10 April 1877; Forbes, New South Wales, Australia
- Died: 18 April 1943 (aged 66); Sydney, Australia
- Source: ESPNcricinfo, 8 January 2017

William McIntyre (10 April 1877 – 18 April 1943) was an Australian cricketer. He played four first-class matches for New South Wales between 1905/06 and 1906/07.

== See also ==
- List of New South Wales representative cricketers
