= Gary Bensley =

Australian cricketer (born 1958)

Personal information
- Born: 17 October 1958 (age 68); Inverell, Australia
- Source: ESPNcricinfo, 22 December 2016

Gary Bensley (born 17 October 1958) is an Australian cricketer. He played one first-class match for New South Wales in 1983/84.

== See also ==
- List of New South Wales representative cricketers
