= James Kellick =

Australian cricketer

Personal information
- Born: 24 August 1840; Sydney, Colony of New South Wales
- Died: 8 August 1926 (aged 85); Sydney, Australia
- Source: ESPNcricinfo, 2 January 2017

James Kellick (24 August 1840 – 8 August 1926) was an Australian cricketer. He played one first-class match for New South Wales in 1868/69.

== See also ==
- List of New South Wales representative cricketers
