= Ned Sheridan =

Australian cricketer

Personal information
- Full name: Edward Orwell Sheridan
- Born: 3 January 1842; Sydney, Colony of New South Wales
- Died: 30 November 1923 (aged 81); West End, Queensland, Australia
- Source: ESPNcricinfo, 1 February 2017

Ned Sheridan (3 January 1842 – 30 November 1923) was an Australian cricketer. He played ten first-class matches for New South Wales between 1867/68 and 1878/79.

== See also ==
- List of New South Wales representative cricketers
