= Monty Faithfull =

Australian cricketer

Personal information
- Full name: Henry Montague Faithfull
- Born: 16 June 1847; Springfield, New South Wales, Australia
- Died: 22 October 1908 (aged 61); Elizabeth Bay, New South Wales, Australia
- Source: ESPNcricinfo, 28 December 2016

Monty Faithfull (16 June 1847 – 22 October 1908) was an Australian cricketer. He played two first-class matches for New South Wales between 1870/71 and 1874/75.

== See also ==
- List of New South Wales representative cricketers
