= William Makin =

Australian cricketer

Personal information
- Born: 27 September 1883; Bolton, England
- Died: 11 January 1962 (aged 78); Sydney, Australia
- Source: Cricinfo, 7 January 2017

William Makin (27 September 1883 – 11 January 1962) was an Australian cricketer. He played two first-class matches for New South Wales in 1910/11.

== See also ==
- List of New South Wales representative cricketers
