= Walter Hand =

Australian cricketer

Personal information
- Born: 22 July 1847; Richmond-upon-Thames, England
- Died: 2 May 1882 (aged 34); Sydney, Australia
- Source: ESPNcricinfo, 30 December 2016

Walter Hand (22 July 1847 – 2 May 1882) was an Australian cricketer. He played one first-class match for New South Wales in 1871/72.

== See also ==
- List of New South Wales representative cricketers
