= Ernest Jansan =

Australian cricketer

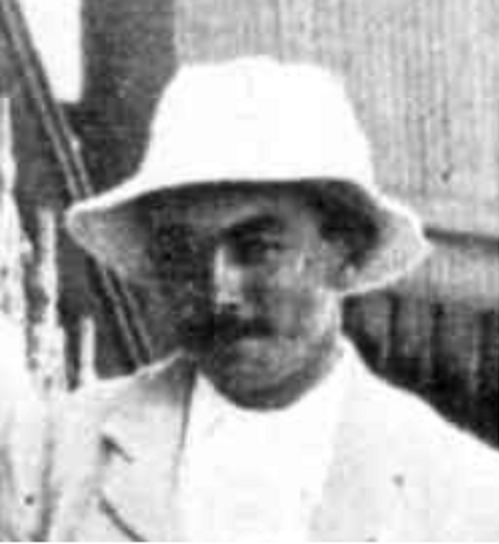

Personal information
- Born: 26 August 1874; Gulgong, Australia
- Died: 31 May 1945 (aged 70); Sydney, New South Wales, Australia
- Source: ESPNcricinfo, 1 January 2017

Ernest Jansan (26 August 1874 – 31 May 1945) was an Australian cricketer. He played three first-class matches for New South Wales between 1899/1900 and 1903/04.

== See also ==
- List of New South Wales representative cricketers
