= Percy Newton (cricketer) =

Australian cricketer

Personal information
- Born: 21 December 1880; Sydney, Australia
- Died: 25 April 1946 (aged 65); Sydney, Australia
- Source: ESPNcricinfo, 11 January 2017

Percy Newton (21 December 1880 – 25 April 1946) was an Australian cricketer. He played two first-class matches for New South Wales in 1907/08.

== See also ==
- List of New South Wales representative cricketers
