= Richard Murray (cricketer) =

Australian cricketer

Personal information
- Born: 1831; Sydney
- Died: 21 November 1861 (aged 29–30); Sydney, Australia
- Source: ESPNcricinfo, 9 January 2017

Richard Murray (1831–21 November 1861) was an Australian cricketer. He played four first-class matches for New South Wales between 1855–56 and 1859–60.

== See also ==
- List of New South Wales representative cricketers
