= Francis Downes (cricketer) =

Australian cricketer

Personal information
- Born: 11 June 1864; Sydney, Australia
- Died: 20 May 1916 (aged 51); Sydney, Australia
- Source: ESPNcricinfo, 26 December 2016

Francis Downes (11 June 1864 – 20 May 1916) was an Australian cricketer. He played six first-class matches for New South Wales between 1881/82 and 1890/91.

== See also ==
- List of New South Wales representative cricketers
