= David Pryor (cricketer) =

Australian cricketer (1870–1937)

Personal information
- Born: 3 February 1870; Maitland, New South Wales, Australia
- Died: 3 January 1937 (aged 66); Gosford, New South Wales, Australia
- Source: Cricinfo, 15 January 2017

David Pryor (3 February 1870 – 3 January 1937) was an Australian cricketer. He played five first-class matches for New South Wales in 1895/96.

== See also ==
- List of New South Wales representative cricketers
