= Justin Kenny =

Australian cricketer (born 1966)

Personal information
- Born: 24 September 1966 (age 60); Sydney, Australia
- Source: ESPNcricinfo, 2 January 2017

Justin Kenny (born 24 September 1966) is an Australian cricketer. He played four first-class matches for New South Wales between 1988/89 and 1990/91.

== See also ==
- List of New South Wales representative cricketers
