= William Roberts (Australian cricketer) =

Australian cricketer

Personal information
- Full name: William Roberts
- Source: ESPNcricinfo, 23 January 2017

William Roberts was an Australian cricketer. He played one first-class match for New South Wales in 1880/81.

== See also ==
- List of New South Wales representative cricketers
