= William Sinclair (cricketer) =

Australian cricketer

Personal information
- Born: 13 April 1846; Inverell, New South Wales, Australia
- Died: 28 November 1869 (aged 23); Bukkulla, New South Wales, Australia
- Source: Cricket Archive, 1 February 2017

William Sinclair (13 April 1846 – 28 November 1869) was an Australian cricketer. He played one first-class match for New South Wales in 1867/68.

== See also ==
- List of New South Wales representative cricketers
