= Fairfax Brown =

Australian cricketer

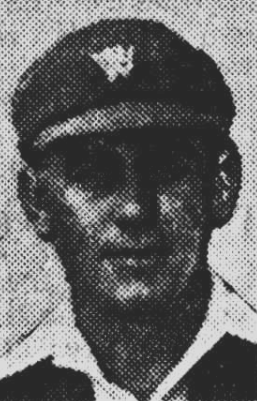

Personal information
- Full name: Walter Graham Fairfax Brown
- Born: 12 April 1899; Sydney, Australia
- Died: 21 May 1931 (aged 32); Sydney, Australia
- Source: ESPNcricinfo, 23 December 2016

Fairfax Brown (12 April 1899 – 21 May 1931) was an Australian cricketer. He played nine first-class matches for New South Wales between 1919/20 and 1925/26.

== Cricket career ==
Brown began his cricket career playing in school. He then played for Sydney in district cricket and topped the first-grade aggregate for the 1922/23 season scoring 768 runs at 45.1. He later played for Mosman. He often played State 2nd XI games in addition to representing New South Wales in the Sheffield Shield as an opening batsman. He was still a respected cricketer and tennis player when he passed due to pneumonia in 1931.

== See also ==
- List of New South Wales representative cricketers
