= Paul Stepto =

Australian cricketer (born 1966)

Personal information
- Born: 23 December 1966 (age 59); Sydney, Australia
- Source: ESPNcricinfo, 2 February 2017

Paul Stepto (born 23 December 1966) is an Australian cricketer. He played one first-class match for New South Wales in 1986/87.

== See also ==
- List of New South Wales representative cricketers
