= Percy Dive =

Australian cricketer

Personal information
- Born: 10 July 1881; Sydney, Australia
- Died: 17 September 1965 (aged 84); Roseville, New South Wales, Australia
- Source: ESPNcricinfo, 26 December 2016

Percy Dive (10 July 1881 – 17 September 1965) was an Australian cricketer. He played one first-class match for New South Wales in 1924/25.

== See also ==
- List of New South Wales representative cricketers
