= William Robison =

Australian cricketer

Personal information
- Born: 14 December 1874; Camden, New South Wales, Australia
- Died: 5 July 1916 (aged 41); Sydney, Australia
- Source: ESPNcricinfo, 23 January 2017

William Robison (14 December 1874 – 5 July 1916) was an Australian cricketer. He played one first-class match for New South Wales in 1893/94.

== See also ==
- List of New South Wales representative cricketers
