= Wayne Mulherin =

Australian cricketer (born 1957)

Personal information
- Born: 17 June 1957 (age 69); Sydney, Australia
- Source: ESPNcricinfo, 9 January 2017

Wayne Mulherin (born 17 June 1957) is an Australian cricketer. He played one first-class match for New South Wales in 1983/84.

== See also ==
- List of New South Wales representative cricketers
