= William Watson (cricketer, born 1881) =

Australian cricketer

Personal information
- Born: 10 November 1881; Lambton, New South Wales, Australia
- Died: 12 February 1926 (aged 44); Sydney, Australia
- Source: ESPNcricinfo, 6 February 2017

William Watson (10 November 1881 – 12 February 1926) was an Australian cricketer. He played two first-class matches for New South Wales in 1910/11.

== See also ==
- List of New South Wales representative cricketers
