= Gordon Woolmer =

Australian cricketer

Personal information
- Born: 24 February 1917; Hamilton, New South Wales, Australia
- Died: 31 July 1999 (aged 82); Sydney, Australia
- Source: ESPNcricinfo, 8 February 2017

Gordon Woolmer (24 February 1917 – 31 July 1999) was an Australian cricketer. He played one first-class matches for New South Wales in 1945/46.

== See also ==
- List of New South Wales representative cricketers
