= James Randell =

Australian cricketer

Personal information
- Born: 4 August 1880; Gulgong, New South Wales, Australia
- Died: 7 December 1952 (aged 72); Balgowlah, New South Wales, Australia
- Source: ESPNcricinfo, 17 January 2017

James Randell (4 August 1880 – 7 December 1952) was an Australian cricketer. He played nine first-class matches for New South Wales between 1909/10 and 1924/25.

== See also ==
- List of New South Wales representative cricketers
