= Randal Green =

Australian cricketer (born 1961)

Personal information
- Born: 15 July 1961 (age 65); Melbourne, Australia
- Source: ESPNcricinfo, 30 December 2016

Randal Green (born 15 July 1961) is an Australian cricketer. He played four first-class matches for New South Wales between 1990/91 and 1993/94.

== See also ==
- List of New South Wales representative cricketers
