= Raymond Boyce (cricketer) =

Australian cricketer

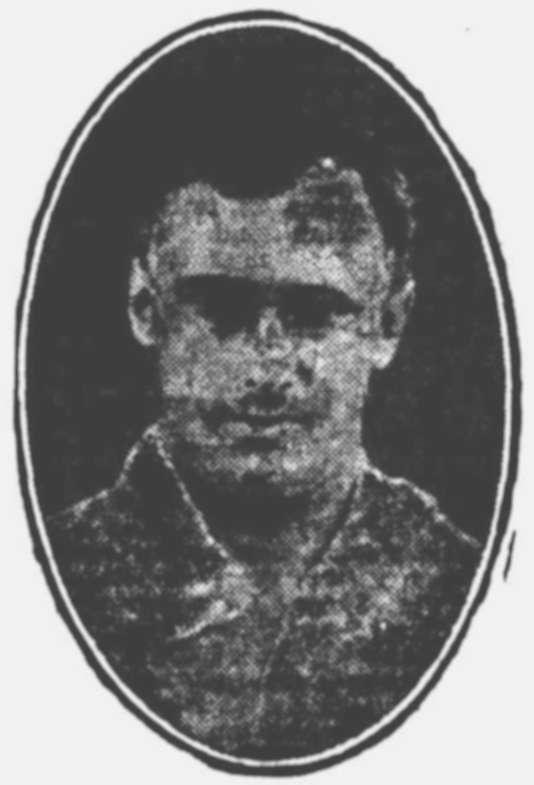

Personal information
- Born: 28 June 1891; Taree, New South Wales, Australia
- Died: 20 January 1941 (aged 49); Northwood, New South Wales, Australia
- Source: ESPNcricinfo, 23 December 2016

Raymond Boyce (28 June 1891 – 20 January 1941) was an Australian cricketer. He played two first-class matches for New South Wales in 1921/22.

== See also ==
- List of New South Wales representative cricketers
