= Steve Whitfield =

Australian cricketer (born 1950)

Personal information
- Full name: Stephen Bourke John Whitfield
- Born: 21 November 1950 (age 75); Sydney, Australia
- Source: ESPNcricinfo, 8 February 2017

Steve Whitfield (born 21 November 1950) is an Australian cricketer. He played three first-class matches for New South Wales in 1988/89.

== See also ==
- List of New South Wales representative cricketers
