= William Wood (cricketer) =

Australian cricketer

Personal information
- Born: 11 November 1849; Banffshire, Scotland
- Died: 12 April 1924 (aged 74); Marrickville, New South Wales, Australia
- Source: ESPNcricinfo, 8 February 2017

William Wood (11 November 1849 – 12 April 1924) was an Australian cricketer. He played in two first-class matches for New South Wales in 1874/75.

== See also ==
- List of New South Wales representative cricketers
