= Lynn Marks =

Australian cricketer

Personal information
- Full name: Lynn Alexander Marks
- Born: 15 August 1942; Sydney, Australia
- Died: 7 December 1997 (aged 55); Sydney, Australia
- Source: ESPNcricinfo, 7 January 2017

Lynn Marks (15 August 1942 – 7 December 1997) was an Australian cricketer. He played 33 first-class matches for New South Wales and South Australia between 1962/63 and 1968/69.

== See also ==
- List of New South Wales representative cricketers
