= Stuart Webster (cricketer) =

Australian cricketer (born 1946)

Personal information
- Born: 11 June 1946 (age 80); Orange, New South Wales, Australia
- Source: ESPNcricinfo, 6 February 2017

Stuart Webster (born 11 June 1946) is an Australian former cricketer. He played twenty-three first-class and two List A matches for New South Wales between 1972/73 and 1977/78.

== See also ==
- List of New South Wales representative cricketers
