= Brett van Deinsen =

Australian cricketer (born 1977)

Personal information
- Born: 28 December 1977 (age 48); Sydney, Australia
- Source: ESPNcricinfo, 5 February 2017

Brett van Deinsen (born 28 December 1977) is an Australian cricketer. He played eleven first-class and two List A matches for New South Wales between 1999/00 and 2001/02.

== See also ==
- List of New South Wales representative cricketers
