= Benjamin Salmon =

Australian cricketer

Personal information
- Born: 9 January 1906; Melbourne, Australia
- Died: 24 January 1979 (aged 73); Sydney, Australia
- Source: ESPNcricinfo, 31 January 2017

Benjamin Salmon (9 January 1906 – 24 January 1979) was an Australian cricketer. He played five first-class matches for New South Wales between 1924/25 and 1931/32.

== See also ==
- List of New South Wales representative cricketers
