= Leslie Best =

Australian cricketer

Personal information
- Born: 20 November 1893; Seven Hills, New South Wales, Australia
- Died: 27 August 1925 (aged 31); Redfern, New South Wales, Australia
- Source: ESPNcricinfo, 22 December 2016

Leslie Best (20 November 1893 – 27 August 1925) was an Australian cricketer. He played one first-class match for New South Wales in 1914/15.

== See also ==
- List of New South Wales representative cricketers
