= Barney Russell =

Australian cricketer

Personal information
- Born: 11 August 1890; Sydney, Australia
- Died: 13 July 1961 (aged 70); Belmore, New South Wales, Australia
- Source: ESPNcricinfo, 25 January 2017

Barney Russell (11 August 1890 – 13 July 1961) was an Australian cricketer. He played three first-class matches for New South Wales between 1920/21 and 1921/22. He also played for Marrickville Cricket Club. He was also secretary of the rugby league club of Canterbury-Bankstown.

== See also ==
- List of New South Wales representative cricketers
