= James Suppel =

Australian cricketer

Personal information
- Born: 19 October 1914; Warren, New South Wales, Australia
- Died: 9 March 1994 (aged 79); Sydney, Australia
- Source: ESPNcricinfo, 2 February 2017

James Suppel (19 October 1914 – 9 March 1994) was an Australian cricketer. He played one first-class match for New South Wales in 1946/47.

== See also ==
- List of New South Wales representative cricketers
