= Marcus Blaxland =

Australian cricketer

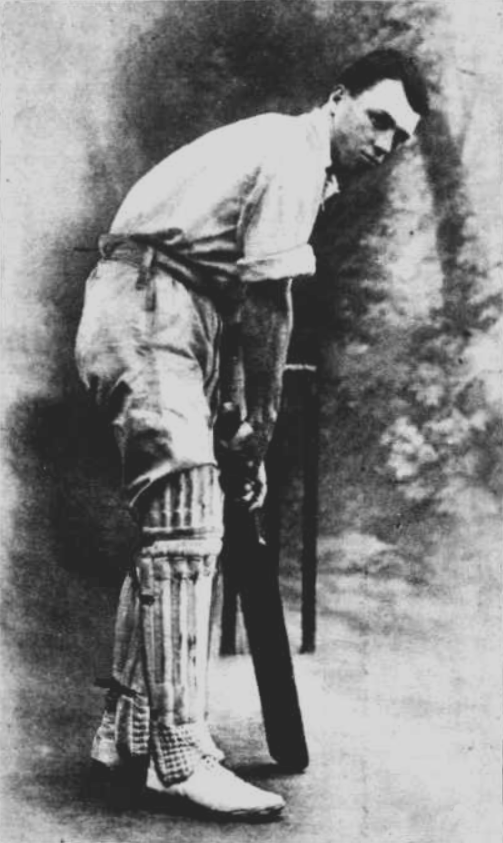

Personal information
- Born: 29 April 1884; Callan Park, New South Wales, Australia
- Died: 31 July 1958 (aged 74); Clayfield, Queensland, Australia
- Source: Cricinfo, 23 December 2016

Marcus Blaxland (29 April 1884 – 31 July 1958) was an Australian cricketer. He played ten first-class matches for New South Wales between 1903/04 and 1907/08 and one match for Queensland in 1923/24.

Blaxland attended Sydney Grammar School where he played for the cricket team and was mentored by state selector G.P. Barbour. He scored aggregates of 917, 1121, and 2000 runs in his first three seasons for the school side and helped set four wicket partnership records. He then began playing for Balmain in district cricket and was selected to represent NSW against Queensland in a first-class match in 1903, in which he batted well but did not get a large score. In 1906 he was described as being the best left-handed batsman in New South Wales, with strong offside play with his best stroke being a cutshot to behind point. He was also praised as a good fielder with his position being at shortslip.

As of 1923 Blaxland had moved to Warwick in Queensland where he continued playing cricket and in November 1923 he was selected to captain the Queensland Country team which played against metropolitan teams in Brisbane. In December he was selected to represent Queensland against New South Wales however he was unwell during the match. After his playing career he became cricket master at Toowoomba Grammar School and in 1939 he registered to play in Toowoomba club cricket.

== See also ==
- List of New South Wales representative cricketers
