= Peter Anderson (cricketer, born 1933) =

Australian cricketer

Personal information
- Born: 4 October 1933 (age 93); Melbourne, Australia
- Source: ESPNcricinfo, 22 December 2016

Peter Anderson (born 4 October 1933) is an Australian cricketer. He played eight first-class matches for New South Wales in 1966/67.

== See also ==
- List of New South Wales representative cricketers
