= Bede McCauley =

Australian cricketer

Personal information
- Full name: Bede Vincent McCauley
- Born: 11 June 1911; Sydney, Australia
- Died: 14 October 1994 (aged 83); Sydney, Australia
- Source: ESPNcricinfo, 7 January 2017

Bede McCauley (11 June 1911 – 14 October 1994) was an Australian cricketer. He played four first-class matches for New South Wales between 1937/38 and 1938/39. He also played for Randwick Cricket Club, Mosman Cricket Club and Combined Services. He also played rugby. He played for Randwick in rugby union. He was also an academic and a business manager. He was also a member of the Second Australian Imperial Force and the Royal Australian Air Force (RAAF), and was in Japan for two years after the War, where he played cricket for the 81st Fighter Wing of the RAAF.

== See also ==
- List of New South Wales representative cricketers
