= Greg McLay =

Australian cricketer (born 1969)

Personal information
- Full name: Gregory Francis McLay
- Born: 7 May 1969 (age 57); Wagga Wagga, Australia
- Source: ESPNcricinfo, 8 January 2017

Greg McLay (born 7 May 1969) is an Australian cricketer. He played six first-class matches for New South Wales in 1990/91.

== See also ==
- List of New South Wales representative cricketers
