= Daniel Cullen (New South Wales cricketer) =

Australian cricketer

Personal information
- Born: 27 April 1889; Sydney, Australia
- Died: 21 July 1971 (aged 82); Sydney, Australia
- Source: ESPNcricinfo, 25 December 2016

Daniel Cullen (27 April 1889 – 21 July 1971) was an Australian cricketer. He played two first-class matches for New South Wales between 1912/13 and 1913/14.

Cullen, a right-handed fast bowler, played locally for Glebe District.

The Sydney Morning Herald, reviewing his performance in 1912, called him a "promising" first-grade bowler. His bowling, although not as fast as his "clubmate Cotter", could "swing-away" from right-handed batsman and sometimes "bend back from the off".

Also in 1912, a Saturday Referee and The Arrow reader asked whether Cullen should be displaced from the New South Wales colts team in favour of Sydney Shea, a fellow fast bowler from Waverley. The paper's columnist replied both were "very promising" but Cullen's bowling was faster, "and it is the fastest possible bowling we want to develop".

== See also ==
- List of New South Wales representative cricketers
