= William Macnish =

Australian cricketer

Personal information
- Born: 29 October 1842; Sydney, Australia
- Died: 29 November 1873 (aged 31); Bundaberg, Queensland, Australia
- Source: ESPNcricinfo, 6 January 2017

William Macnish (29 October 1842 – 29 November 1873) was an Australian cricketer. He played one first-class match for New South Wales in 1862/63.

== See also ==
- List of New South Wales representative cricketers
