= Ron Moss (cricketer) =

Australian cricketer

Personal information
- Full name: Ronald Barber Moss
- Born: 13 June 1922; Sydney, Australia
- Died: 22 October 2004 (aged 82); Penrith, New South Wales, Australia
- Source: ESPNcricinfo, 9 January 2017

Ron Moss (13 June 1922 – 22 October 2004) was an Australian cricketer. He played three first-class matches for New South Wales in 1948/49.

== See also ==
- List of New South Wales representative cricketers
