= Ted Scanlan (cricketer) =

Australian cricketer

Personal information
- Full name: Edmund Scanlan
- Born: 7 December 1847; Sunderland, England
- Died: 9 January 1916 (aged 68); Sydney, Australia
- Source: ESPNcricinfo, 31 January 2017

Ted Scanlan (7 December 1847 – 9 January 1916) was an Australian cricketer. He played one first-class match for New South Wales in 1877/78.

== See also ==
- List of New South Wales representative cricketers
