= Keith McPhillamy =

Australian cricketer

Personal information
- Born: 20 June 1882; Bathurst, New South Wales, Australia
- Died: 3 May 1937 (aged 54); Bowral, New South Wales, Australia
- Source: ESPNcricinfo, 8 January 2017

Keith McPhillamy (20 June 1882 – 3 May 1937) was an Australian cricketer. He played one first-class match for New South Wales in 1904/05.

== See also ==
- List of New South Wales representative cricketers
