= Herbert MacPherson (cricketer) =

Australian cricketer

Personal information
- Born: 20 February 1869; Mudgee, Australia
- Died: 12 November 1953 (aged 84); Mudgee, Australia
- Source: ESPNcricinfo, 6 January 2017

Herbert MacPherson (20 February 1869 – 12 November 1953) was an Australian cricketer. He played three first-class matches for New South Wales between 1893/94 and 1894/95.

== See also ==
- List of New South Wales representative cricketers
