= Adam Mather =

Australian cricketer

Personal information
- Born: 26 November 1860; Paterson, New South Wales, Australia
- Died: 31 August 1917 (aged 56); Singleton, New South Wales, Australia
- Source: ESPNcricinfo, 7 January 2017

Adam Mather (26 November 1860 – 31 August 1917) was an Australian cricketer. He played three first-class matches for New South Wales between 1885/86 and 1886/87. He stopped playing cricket after an injury.

== See also ==
- List of New South Wales representative cricketers
