= Les Fallowfield =

Australian cricketer

Personal information
- Full name: Leslie John Fallowfield
- Born: 12 March 1914; Sydney, Australia
- Died: 29 May 1999 (aged 85); Sydney, Australia
- Source: ESPNcricinfo, 28 December 2016

Les Fallowfield (12 March 1914 – 29 May 1999) was an Australian cricketer. He played eleven first-class matches for New South Wales between 1934/35 and 1941/42.

== See also ==
- List of New South Wales representative cricketers
