= Norman Morris (Australian cricketer) =

Australian cricketer (1907–1982)

Personal information
- Born: 9 May 1907; Sydney, Australia
- Died: 15 July 1982 (aged 75); Sydney, Australia
- Source: ESPNcricinfo, 9 January 2017

Norman Morris (9 May 1907 – 15 July 1982) was an Australian cricketer. He played four first-class matches for New South Wales in 1928/29.

== See also ==
- List of New South Wales representative cricketers
