= Robert Vaughan (cricketer) =

Australian cricketer

Personal information
- Born: 1834
- Died: 12 July 1865 (aged 30–31) at sea between Australia and New Zealand
- Source: ESPNcricinfo, 5 February 2017

Robert Vaughan (1834 – 12 July 1865) was an Australian cricketer. He played two first-class matches for New South Wales between 1855/56 and 1857/58.

== See also ==
- List of New South Wales representative cricketers
