= John Beeston (Australian cricketer) =

Australian cricketer

Personal information
- Born: 17 January 1831; Bingley Locks, Yorkshire, England
- Died: 1 June 1873 (aged 42); Newcastle, New South Wales, Australia
- Source: ESPNcricinfo, 22 December 2016

John Beeston (17 January 1831 – 1 June 1873) was an Australian cricketer. He played three first-class matches for New South Wales between 1857/58 and 1860/61.

== See also ==
- List of New South Wales representative cricketers
