= Joel Joseph =

Australian cricketer

Personal information
- Born: 1867; Australia
- Died: 1942 (aged 74–75); Canterbury, New South Wales, Australia
- Source: ESPNcricinfo, 2 January 2017

Joel Joseph (1867 – 6 September 1942) was an Australian cricketer. He played five first-class matches for New South Wales in 1889/90. Joseph was Jewish.

== See also ==
- List of New South Wales representative cricketers
