= Reginald Pearce =

Australian cricketer

Personal information
- Born: 20 April 1918; Tumbarumba, Australia
- Died: 19 June 1995 (aged 77); Sydney, Australia
- Source: ESPNcricinfo, 15 January 2017

Reginald Pearce (20 April 1918 – 19 June 1995) was an Australian cricketer. He played three first-class matches for New South Wales in 1952/53.

== See also ==
- List of New South Wales representative cricketers
