= Albert Atkins =

Australian cricketer

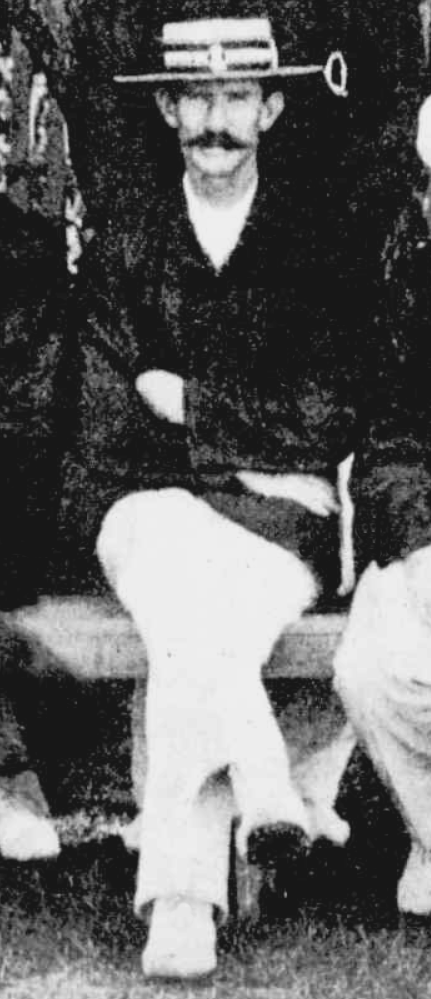

Personal information
- Born: 26 March 1867; Sydney, Australia
- Died: 17 August 1943 (aged 76); Sydney, Australia
- Nickname: Rocco
- Batting: Right-handed
- Role: Batsman

Domestic team information
- Years: Team
- 1895-96 to 1905-06: Queensland
- 1896-97: New South Wales

Career statistics
| Competition | First-class |
|---|---|
| Matches | 12 |
| Runs scored | 398 |
| Batting average | 18.95 |
| 100s/50s | 0/3 |
| Top score | 82 |
| Balls bowled | 0 |
| Wickets | – |
| Bowling average | – |
| 5 wickets in innings | – |
| 10 wickets in match | – |
| Best bowling | – |
| Catches/stumpings | 8/0 |
- Source: ESPNcricinfo, 23 January 2020

Albert Atkins (26 March 1867 – 17 August 1943) was an Australian cricketer. He played twelve first-class matches for New South Wales and Queensland between 1895/96 and 1905/06.

Atkins was a middle-order batsman and excellent fieldsman in the outfield, praised in 1896 for his "brilliancy and cat-like dash". He captained Queensland on several occasions, including the closely fought match against New South Wales in Sydney in 1902-03 when he made his two highest scores, 82 and 60. He and his wife Emily had three children.

== See also ==
- List of New South Wales representative cricketers
