= Richard Hall (Australian cricketer) =

Australian cricketer

Personal information
- Full name: Richard Hall
- Source: ESPNcricinfo, 30 December 2016

Richard Hall was an Australian cricketer. He played two first-class matches for New South Wales between 1880/81 and 1883/84.

== See also ==
- List of New South Wales representative cricketers
