= Lyall Berry =

Australian cricketer

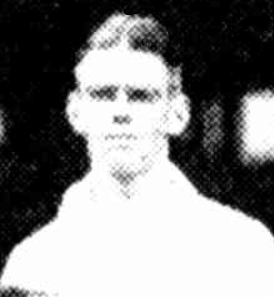

Personal information
- Full name: Walter Lyall Berry
- Born: 9 April 1893; Woolwich, New South Wales, Australia
- Died: 20 April 1970 (aged 77); Ettalong Beach, New South Wales, Australia
- Source: ESPNcricinfo, 22 December 2016

Lyall Berry (9 April 1893 – 20 April 1970) was an Australian cricketer. He played three first-class matches for New South Wales between 1918/19 and 1919/20.

== See also ==
- List of New South Wales representative cricketers
