= John Callachor =

Australian cricketer

Personal information
- Born: 10 November 1857; Woolloomooloo, Colony of New South Wales
- Died: 20 February 1924 (aged 66); Lane Cove, New South Wales, Australia
- Source: ESPNcricinfo, 24 December 2016

John Callachor (10 November 1857 – 20 February 1924) was an Australian cricketer. He played one first-class match for New South Wales in 1882/83.

== See also ==
- List of New South Wales representative cricketers
