= Kerry Owen =

Australian cricketer (born 1943)

Personal information
- Born: 23 June 1943 (age 83); Sydney, Australia
- Source: Cricinfo, 13 January 2017

Kerry Owen (born 23 June 1943) is an Australian cricketer. He played one first-class match for New South Wales in 1965/66.

== See also ==
- List of New South Wales representative cricketers
