= Thomas Nunn =

Australian cricketer

Personal information
- Born: 21 January 1846; Penshurst, Kent, England
- Died: 31 May 1889 (aged 43); Sydney, Australia
- Source: ESPNcricinfo, 11 January 2017

Thomas Nunn (21 January 1846 – 31 May 1889) was an Australian cricketer. He played five first-class matches for New South Wales between 1880/81 and 1884/85.

== See also ==
- List of New South Wales representative cricketers
