= Raymond Rowe (cricketer) =

Australian cricketer

Personal information
- Born: 9 December 1913; Harris Park, New South Wales, Australia
- Died: 14 May 1995 (aged 81); Parramatta, Australia
- Source: ESPNcricinfo, 24 January 2017

Raymond Rowe (9 December 1913 – 14 May 1995) was an Australian cricketer. He played ten first-class matches for New South Wales between 1932/33 and 1933/34.

== See also ==
- List of New South Wales representative cricketers
