= Barry Rothwell =

Australian cricketer (born 1939)

Personal information
- Full name: Barry Alan Rothwell
- Born: 18 August 1939 (age 87); Sydney, Australia
- Batting: Right-handed
- Role: Batsman

Domestic team information
- Years: Team
- 1963–64 to 1968–69: New South Wales

Career statistics
Competition	First-class
Matches	36
Runs scored	1685
Batting average	31.20
100s/50s	1/10
Top score	125
Balls bowled	34
Wickets	2
Bowling average	19.50
5 wickets in innings	0
10 wickets in match	0
Best bowling	1/2
Catches/stumpings	10/–
- Source: Cricinfo, 30 June 2023

Barry Alan Rothwell (born 18 August 1939) is a former Australian cricketer. He played 36 first-class matches for New South Wales between 1963/64 and 1968/69.

Rothwell was a middle-order batsman. When New South Wales' Test players were absent for the final matches of the 1964–65 Sheffield Shield season, Rothwell captained New South Wales and led them to the title, in which he contributed 438 runs at an average of 54.75. In 1965–66 he again took over the captaincy when Test players were absent, and scored 125 and 30 in the victory over Queensland. An occasional bowler, he dismissed the England opening batsman Bob Barber with his first delivery in first-class cricket.
