= Ron James (cricketer) =

Australian cricketer

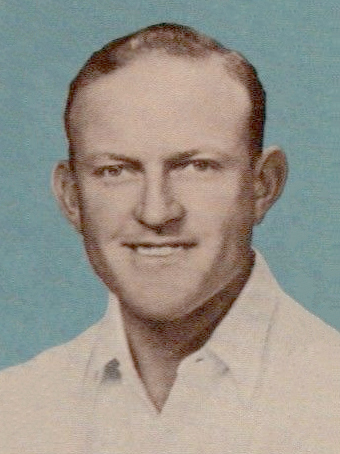
- James on a 1948 card

Personal information
- Born: 13 May 1920; Sydney, Australia
- Died: 28 April 1983 (aged 62); Auburn, New South Wales, Australia

Career statistics
Competition	First-class
Matches	45
Runs scored	2582
Batting average	40.34
100s/50s	4/16
Top score	210
Balls bowled	199
Wickets	1
Bowling average	199.0
5 wickets in innings	0
10 wickets in match	0
Best bowling	1/65
Catches/stumpings	23/0
- Source: ESPNcricinfo, 1 January 2017

Ronald Victor James (23 May 1920 – 28 April 1983) was an Australian cricketer. He played 45 first-class matches for New South Wales and South Australia between 1938/39 and 1950/51.

== See also ==
- List of New South Wales representative cricketers
