= Ted Adams (cricketer) =

Australian cricketer

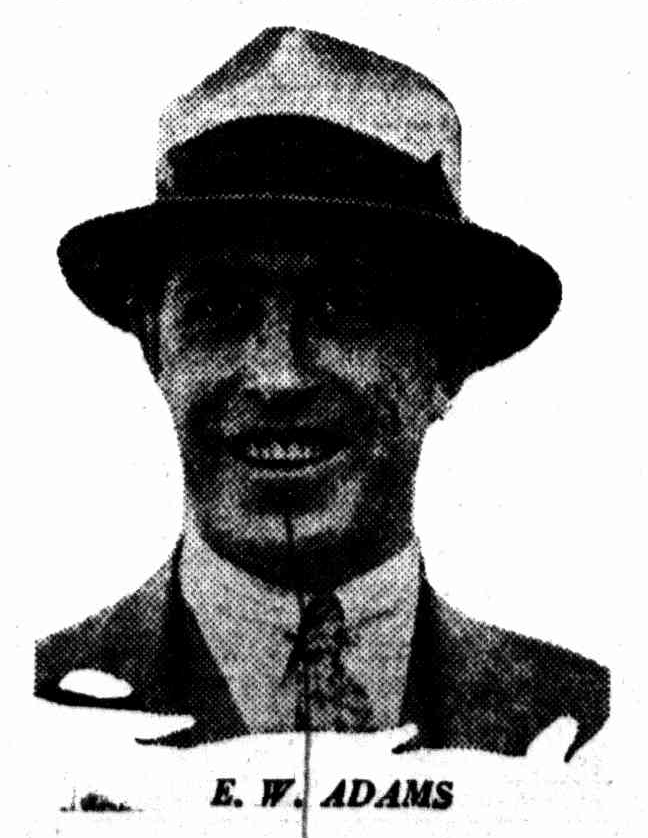

Personal information
- Full name: Edward William Adams
- Born: 10 July 1896; Bathurst, New South Wales
- Died: 25 May 1977 (aged 80)
- Batting: Right-handed
- Bowling: Right-arm medium-fast

Domestic team information
- Years: Team
- 1919/20: New South Wales
- Only FC: 3 April 1920 NSW v Queensland

Career statistics
Competition	First-class
Matches	1
Runs scored	18
Batting average	–
100s/50s	0/0
Top score	18*
Balls bowled	112
Wickets	0
Bowling average	–
5 wickets in innings	–
10 wickets in match	–
Best bowling	–
Catches/stumpings	0/–
- Source: CricketArchive, 28 June 2016

Edward William Adams CBE (10 July 1896 – 25 May 1977) was an Australian first-class cricketer who played a single senior match for New South Wales during the 1919–20 season.

After his cricket career finished, he served as deputy town clerk, then town clerk for the Sydney City Council. As deputy town clerk, he was selected as one of the council's representatives to the Coronation of Queen Elizabeth II in 1953. In the 1962 Birthday Honours, Adams was made a Commander of the Order of the British Empire (CBE).
