= Thomas Hogue =

Australian cricketer

Personal information
- Born: 5 October 1877; Wickham, New South Wales, Australia
- Died: 6 May 1956 (aged 78); Nedlands, Western Australia
- Source: ESPNcricinfo, 31 December 2016

Thomas Hogue (5 October 1877 – 6 May 1956) was an Australian cricketer. He played seventeen first-class matches for New South Wales and Western Australia between 1901/02 and 1912/13, scoring one century (119) and five half centuries. His best bowling figures were 4 for 26.
