= Walter Yeates =

Australian cricketer

Personal information
- Full name: George Walter Carrington Yeates
- Born: 5 May 1918; Erskineville, New South Wales, Australia
- Died: 8 April 1967 (aged 48); Kogarah Bay, New South Wales, Australia
- Batting: Left-handed
- Bowling: Leg-break

Domestic team information
- Years: Team
- 1949/50: New South Wales
- Source: ESPNcricinfo, 7 December 2015

George Walter Carrington Yeates (5 May 1918 – 8 April 1967) was an Australian cricketer. He was a left-handed batsman and leg-break bowler. He played six first-class cricket matches for New South Wales between 1949 and 1950, scoring 299 runs and taking 6 wickets.
