= Maurice Shea =

Australian cricketer

Personal information
- Full name: Maurice Bernard Shea
- Born: 7 June 1869; Campbelltown, New South Wales, Australia
- Died: 26 July 1946 (aged 77); Waverley, Sydney, Australia
- Batting: Left-handed
- Bowling: Right-arm medium
- Role: Bowler

Domestic team information
- Years: Team
- 1895/96: New South Wales
- Source: CricInfo, 31 January 2017

Maurice Bernard Shea (Note: Shea's forename is sometimes spelled Morris. CricInfo gives his name as Maurice Bernard Shaw, and the name Maurice is used in contemporary reports in Australian newspapers.) (7 June 1869 – 26 July 1946) was an Australian cricketer. He played four first-class matches for New South Wales in 1895–96.

Born at Campbelltown in New South Wales in 1869, all four of Shea's matches for New South Wales came on the team's 1895–96 tour of New Zealand. Described as a "right-arm bowler with a free easy delivery", he played club cricket for East Sydney Electorate Cricket Club.

In 1894–95, Shea was the third leading wicket-taker in the newly formed Sydney Electoral Cricket competition, and played for a Sydney Juniors team against the touring England Test team. The Sydney team, which featured 18 players, scored 443 runs against the English in a two-day match. Shea, whose name is transcribed as O'Shea, took the wicket of Jack Brown. Described as a "good" bowler, he batted left-handed and was considered a "fair" batsman and "a first-class field".

Shea played in four of the five matches on the tour of New Zealand, during which New South Wales played each of the Major Associations as well as playing a match against a New Zealand representative team. Described as "one of our best bowlers", he took four wickets, three of them for the cost of six runs against Auckland in the final match of the tour.

Generally batting towards the end of the order, Shea scored 90 runs on the tour. Against Wellington he made scores of 24 not out in his first innings, an innings described as "hard hit" and including two sixes off the bowling of Frank Ashbolt, before making a "lively" 25 runs in the second. Cricket magazine considered that his batting was some of the most successful of the match and helped New South Wales recover from a "disappointing" start to their innings. He scored 18 against Canterbury, and made a "hard hit" 15 against the New Zealand XI.

He umpired against Otago, doing so in an "absolutely fair" way according to the cricket correspondent of the Otago Witness, despite optimistic appealing by the Otago players. Some years later, Les Poidevin, who also made his first-class debut for New South Wales on the tour, recounted that Shea, "forgetting himself in the moment", had appealed for a catch behind, to the amusement of the players.

Although Shea did not played in the Sheffield Shield for New South Wales, he continued playing for East Sydney in Electoral Cricket. The seasom after the tour of New Zealand, he scored 64 not out in a club match against Burwood Cricket Club. By the 1903-04 season he was playing for Sydney Cricket Club, (Note: The current Sydney Cricket Club is not the same team.) primarily in the Second Grade, although "excellent form with the bat, including a century against Glebe II, saw him promoted to the First Grade team.

Shea worked in the mail department of the General Post Office, Sydney. He was married with five daughters. He died at Waverley in Sydney in 1946. He was 77.
