= Maxwell Ward (cricketer) =

Australian cricketer

Personal information
- Born: 3 February 1907; Sydney, Australia
- Died: 24 October 1983 (aged 76); New Lambton Heights, New South Wales, Australia
- Source: ESPNcricinfo, 5 February 2017

Maxwell Ward (3 February 1907 – 24 October 1983) was an Australian cricketer. He played two first-class matches for New South Wales in 1936/37.

== See also ==
- List of New South Wales representative cricketers
