= Mike Pawley =

Australian cricketer & philanthropist

Personal information
- Full name: Michael Bernard Pawley
- Born: 10 March 1944 (age 82); Glen Innes, New South Wales, Australia
- Batting: Right-handed
- Bowling: Slow left-arm orthodox
- Role: Allrounder

Domestic team information
- Years: Team
- 1969/70–1973/74: New South Wales

Career statistics
Competition	First-class
Matches	11
Runs scored	153
Batting average	11.67
100s/50s	0/1
Top score	50
Balls bowled	1,930
Wickets	20
Bowling average	37.40
5 wickets in innings	0
10 wickets in match	0
Best bowling	4/67
Catches/stumpings	5/–
- Source: ESPNcricinfo, 4 October 2019

Mike Pawley OAM (born 10 March 1944), also known as Mick Pawley, is an Australian former professional cricketer, philanthropist and business owner. He played 11 first-class cricket matches for New South Wales between 1969/70 and 1973/74.

Pawley owns a chain of local sports stores, Mike Pawley Sports, with five stores across Sydney’s Northern Beaches. He founded and runs the Happy Days Cambodian Village School Charity. Mike Pawley Oval in North Curl Curl is named after him.

Pawley studied a for Bachelor of Science degree and Diploma of Education at Sydney University. He was awarded the Order of Australia Medal in 2011 and is a life member of Cricket NSW.
