= Geoffrey Trueman =

Australian cricketer

Personal information
- Full name: Geoffrey Stanley Trueman
- Born: 7 January 1926; Sydney, New South Wales, Australia
- Died: 28 June 1981 (aged 55); Sydney, New South Wales, Australia
- Batting: Right-handed
- Role: Batsman

Domestic team information
- Years: Team
- 1951/52–1953/54: New South Wales
- FC debut: 19 October 1951 NSW v Queensland
- Last FC: 19 February 1954 NSW v South Australia

Career statistics
| Competition | First-class |
|---|---|
| Matches | 24 |
| Runs scored | 135 |
| Batting average | 7.94 |
| 100s/50s | 0/0 |
| Top score | 16 |
| Catches/stumpings | 63/19 |
- Source: ESPNcricinfo, 4 February 2017

Geoffrey Stanley Trueman (7 January 1926 – 28 June 1981) was an Australian cricketer. He played 24 first-class matches for New South Wales between the 1951–52 and 1953–54 seasons.

Geoffrey Trueman was born at Sydney in New South Wales in 1926. He played as a wicket-keeper for New South Wales in the early 1950s. He played a total of 24 matches for the team, scoring 135 runs and being involved in 82 dismissals. These featured 20 stumpings, 18 of which were from the bowling of Richie Benaud. He played in two Sheffield Shield winning teams, New South Wales winning the Shield in his first and last seasons in first-class cricket. His Wisden obituary reported that he had come close to selection for the Australia national cricket team.

After taking a job at a hotel at Junee, Trueman declared himself "unavailable" for the New South Wales team in late 1954 and did not play again for the State team. He played Victorian Premier Cricket for South Melbourne Cricket Club later in the decade. He died at Sydney in 1981 aged 55.
