= George Youill =

Australian cricketer

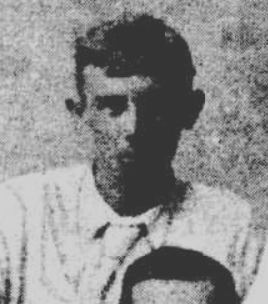

Personal information
- Full name: George Joseph Youill
- Born: 2 October 1871; Sydney, New South Wales, Australia
- Died: 21 December 1936 (aged 65); Glebe, New South Wales, Australia
- Batting: Right-handed

Domestic team information
- Years: Team
- 1889/90–1895/96: New South Wales
- Source: ESPNcricinfo, 8 December 2015

George Joseph Youill (2 October 1871 – 21 December 1936) was an Australian cricketer. He was a right-handed batsman. He played 14 first-class cricket matches for New South Wales between 1889 and 1896, scoring 372 runs.
