= Des Mullarkey =

Australian sportsman

Personal information
- Full name: Desmond Anthony Mullarkey
- Born: 19 September 1899 Sydney, Australia
- Died: 1 September 1975 (aged 75) Randwick, New South Wales

Playing information
- Position: Centre
Club
| Years | Team | Pld | T | G | FG | P |
|---|---|---|---|---|---|---|
| 1922 | St. George | 14 | 5 | 1 | 0 | 17 |
- Source: Whiticker/Hudson
- Cricket career

Cricket information

Domestic team information
- Years: Team
- 1921-28: St. George Cricket Club
- 1923-24: New South Wales
- Source: ESPNcricinfo, 9 January 2017

Des Mullarkey (19 September 1899 – 1 September 1975) was an Australian cricketer. Mullarkey played seven first-class matches for New South Wales in 1923/24. He was also a first-grade rugby league footballer for St. George in the club's second season.

== See also ==
- List of New South Wales representative cricketers
