= Richard Bryant (New South Wales cricketer) =

Australian cricketer

Personal information
- Born: 1847; Maitland, New South Wales, Australia
- Died: 27 October 1931 (aged 83–84); Stockton, New South Wales, Australia
- Source: Cricinfo, 23 December 2016

Richard Bryant (1847 – 27 October 1931) was an Australian cricketer. He played two first-class matches for New South Wales between 1882/83 and 1884/85.

== See also ==
- List of New South Wales representative cricketers
