= Charles Nicholls =

Australian cricketer

Personal information
- Full name: Charles Omer Nicholls
- Born: 5 December 1901; Freemans Reach, New South Wales, Australia
- Died: 14 January 1983 (aged 81); Freemans Reach, New South Wales, Australia
- Batting: Right-handed
- Bowling: Right-arm fast-medium
- Role: All-rounder

Domestic team information
- Years: Team
- 1925/25–1927/28: New South Wales
- Source: ESPNcricinfo, 11 January 2017

Charles Omer Nicholls (5 December 1901 – 14 January 1983) was an Australian cricketer. He played 12 first-class matches, all bar one of them for New South Wales between the 1925–26 and 1928–29 seasons.

Born at Freemans Reach in New South Wales, Nicholls made his first-class debut for New South Wales in December 1925. He took two wickets and scored 12 runs on debut. Described as a "very tall all-rounder" who played club cricket for Central Cumberland, the following season he scored his only first-class century, making 110 runs against Victoria at the Sydney Cricket Ground. Earlier in the season he had taken nine wickets, including a five-wicket haul, against South Australia on the same ground, and these performances saw him earn a trial for the national team in October 1928. He took two wickets and scored 47 runs in The Rest's second innings, but was not called in to the national side and played no more first-class cricket after the end of the 1928–29 season.

Nicholls died at Freemans Reach in 1983. He was aged 81.
