= Colin Blackman =

Australian cricketer (born 1942)

Personal information
- Full name: Oswald Colin Blackman
- Born: 9 March 1942 (age 84); Griffith, New South Wales, Australia
- Batting: Left-handed

Domestic team information
- Years: Team
- 1966–67 to 1968–69: New South Wales

Career statistics
Competition	First-class
Matches	11
Runs scored	488
Batting average	23.23
100s/50s	0/3
Top score	88
Catches/stumpings	4/–
- Source: ESPNcricinfo, 16 June 2023

Oswald Colin Blackman (born 9 March 1942) is an Australian former cricketer. He played 11 first-class matches for New South Wales between 1966/67 and 1968/69.

Blackman was a left-handed opening batsman. He had his best run of form in the 1967-68 Sheffield Shield, when in three matches from late November to early January he scored 36, 63, 20, 10 and 88 and took part in three opening partnerships of more than 100. His 88 in the victory over South Australia was his highest score.
