= Vaughan Williams (cricketer) =

Australian cricketer (born 1977)

Personal information
- Born: 19 December 1977 (age 48); Blaxland, New South Wales, Australia
- Source: ESPNcricinfo, 8 February 2017

Vaughan Williams (born 19 December 1977) is an Australian cricketer. He played one first-class match for New South Wales in 2001/02.

== See also ==
- List of New South Wales representative cricketers
