= Neil Jones (cricketer) =

Australian cricketer (born 1966)

Personal information
- Born: 12 July 1966 (age 60); Stourport-on-Severn, Worcestershire, England
- Source: ESPNcricinfo, 2 January 2017

Neil Jones (born 12 July 1966) is an Australian cricketer. He played one first-class match for New South Wales in 1994/95 and one List A match in 1996/97.

== See also ==
- List of New South Wales representative cricketers
