= Wayne Seabrook =

Australian cricketer (born 1961)

Personal information
- Full name: Wayne John Stephen Seabrook
- Born: 6 September 1961 (age 65); Ryde, Sydney, Australia
- Batting: Right-handed
- Source: Cricinfo, 31 January 2017

Wayne John Stephen Seabrook (born 6 September 1961) is an Australian cricketer. He played four first-class matches for New South Wales between 1984/85 and 1985/86.

A strong season for St George at club level in 1984–85 saw Seabrook selected in the NSW squad. He scored 165 on debut against Victoria that in January 1985, and was selected in the team the following summer, but was unable to rediscover the same form and lost his spot to Mark Taylor. He continued to play for the NSW Second XI for many years.
