= William Still (cricketer) =

Australian cricketer

Personal information
- Born: c. 1820; England
- Died: 1910 (aged 89–90); Sydney, Australia
- Source: ESPNcricinfo, 2 February 2017

William Still (c. 1820 – 5 July 1910) was an Australian cricketer. He played two first-class matches for New South Wales between 1856/57 and 1858/59.

== See also ==
- List of New South Wales representative cricketers
