= Peter Maloney (cricketer) =

Australian cricketer (born 1950)

Personal information
- Born: 5 November 1950 (age 76); Ballina, New South Wales, Australia
- Source: ESPNcricinfo, 7 January 2017

Peter Ivan Maloney (born 5 November 1950) is an Australian former cricketer. He played one first-class match for New South Wales in 1976/77.

== See also ==
- List of New South Wales representative cricketers
