= McGirk =

McGirk may refer to:

- Mathias McGirk (1783–1842), Missouri Supreme Court justice
- McGirk, Missouri, an unincorporated community in Moniteau County, Missouri
- McGirk, Texas, a ghost town in Hamilton County, Texas
