= Robert Fairweather (cricketer) =

Australian cricketer

Personal information
- Born: 24 July 1845; Sydney, Australia
- Died: 31 May 1925 (aged 79); Waverley, New South Wales, Australia
- Source: ESPNcricinfo, 28 December 2016

Robert Fairweather (24 July 1845 – 31 May 1925) was an Australian cricketer. He played one first-class match for New South Wales in 1868/69.

== See also ==
- List of New South Wales representative cricketers
