= Walter Pite =

Australian cricketer

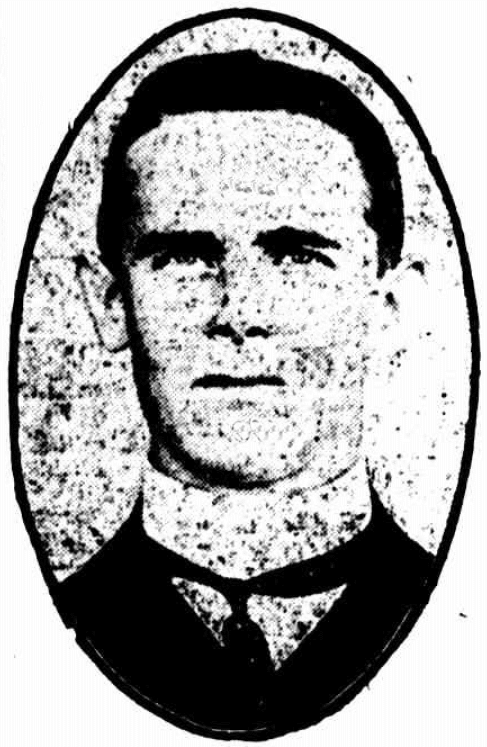

Personal information
- Born: 24 September 1876; Sydney, Australia
- Died: 7 May 1955 (aged 78); Sydney, Australia
- Source: ESPNcricinfo, 15 January 2017

Walter Pite (24 September 1876 – 7 May 1955) was an Australian cricketer. He played two first-class matches for New South Wales between 1901/02 and 1914/15.

== See also ==
- List of New South Wales representative cricketers
