= Victor Trumper Jr =

Australian cricketer

Victor Trumper
Personal information
- Born: 7 October 1913; Chatswood, New South Wales, Australia
- Died: 31 August 1981 (aged 67); Sydney, New South Wales, Australia
- Batting: Left-handed
- Bowling: Right-arm fast-medium
- Role: Bowler
- Relatives: Victor Trumper (father)

Domestic team information
- Years: Team
- 1940/41: New South Wales
- FC debut: 15 November 1940 New South Wales v Queensland
- Last FC: 14 February 1941 New South Wales v Victoria

Career statistics
Competition	First-class
Matches	7
Runs scored	74
Batting average	7.40
100s/50s	0/0
Top score	18
Balls bowled	808
Wickets	12
Bowling average	36.08
5 wickets in innings	0
10 wickets in match	0
Best bowling	3/37
Catches/stumpings	3/–
- Source: CricketArchive, 15 July 2012

Victor Trumper Jr (7 October 1913 – 31 August 1981) was an Australian cricketer. He was the son of versatile Australian batsman and Test cricketer Victor Trumper.

== Biography ==
Trumper was born in 1913 to Victor and Sarah Trumper and was one year old when his father died of Bright's disease.

In contrast to his father, Trumper played as a fast bowler. He was played six times for New South Wales during the 1940–1941 Sheffield Shield season and made an appearance in another first-class match for a Don Bradman XI. After taking two wickets in his first over on debut, he went on to score a total of 74 runs, with a highest score of 18, and take 12 wickets before World War II caused Australian domestic cricket to be suspended at the end of the season. Trumper was described as a "useful" bowler who could make the ball move both ways and got bounce from a high bowling action.

With the outbreak of World War II, Trumper joined the Royal Australian Air Force in 1941. He played cricket during the war for an Australian Services side as well as for Carlton Cricket Club in Victorian Premier Cricket. He was discharged in 1945. He died in 1981 aged 67.
