= Leo McGuirk =

Australian cricketer

Personal information
- Born: 3 May 1908; Binda, New South Wales, Australia
- Died: 27 March 1973 (aged 64); Sydney, Australia
- Source: ESPNcricinfo, 8 January 2017

Leo McGuirk (3 May 1908 – 27 March 1973) was an Australian cricketer. He played one first-class match for New South Wales in 1930/31.

== See also ==
- List of New South Wales representative cricketers
