= William Camphin =

Australian cricketer

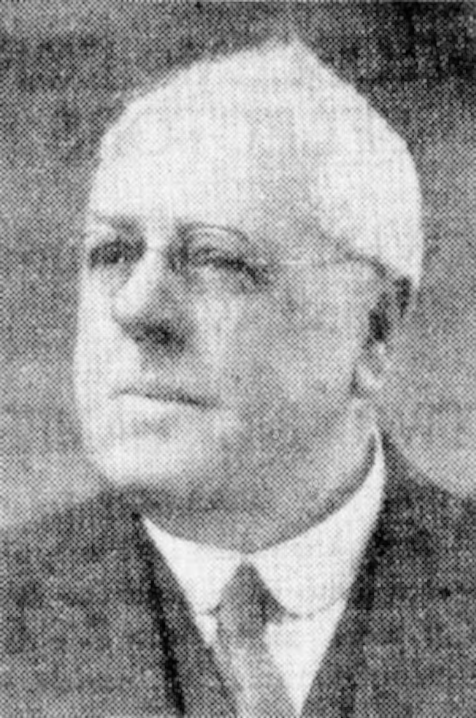

Personal information
- Born: 13 November 1867; Sydney, Australia
- Died: 11 September 1942 (aged 74); Quirindi, New South Wales, Australia
- Source: ESPNcricinfo, 24 December 2016

William Camphin (13 November 1867 – 11 September 1942) was an Australian cricketer. He played two first-class matches for New South Wales between 1892/93 and 1894/95.

== Biography ==
Camphin was born in Sydney in 1867. His father was Superintendent of Detectives.

Camphin made his first-class debut for New South Wales in a match against Queensland in 1893 which was the first first-class match for Queensland. He played his second first-class game against Victoria in 1894. Perhaps his most notable cricketing achievement was a score of 71 made in a non first-class tour game against Lord Sheffield's English team at the Sydney Cricket Ground.

Outside of cricket Camphin was a violinist with the Sydney Liedertafel orchestra and played at the opening of St. Mary's Cathedral in 1883. In his career he was a lawyer having joined the Public Service in 1885 and in 1896 he was appointed deposition clerk at the Central Police Court. In 1903 he joined the Water Police Court as deposition clerk and in 1912 he returned to the Central Police Court as C.P.S.. In 1923 he was appointed to the Sydney Metropolitan Bench and he served on the body until retiring in 1932 as he was considered too old to continue in the position.

He died in 1942 and was survived by a wife and two daughters.

== See also ==
- List of New South Wales representative cricketers
