= Harold McGuirk =

Australian cricketer (1906–1984)

Personal information
- Born: 17 October 1906; Crookwell, New South Wales, Australia
- Died: 19 June 1984 (aged 77); Sydney, Australia
- Source: ESPNcricinfo, 8 January 2017

Harold McGuirk (17 October 1906 – 19 June 1984) was an Australian cricketer. He played two first-class matches for New South Wales in 1926/27.

== See also ==
- List of New South Wales representative cricketers
