= Robert Brewster (cricketer) =

Australian cricketer

Personal information
- Born: 17 August 1867; Sydney, Australia
- Died: 8 November 1962 (aged 95); Sydney, Australia
- Source: ESPNcricinfo, 23 December 2016

Robert Brewster (17 August 1867 – 8 November 1962) was an Australian cricketer. He played one first-class match for New South Wales in 1893/94.

== See also ==
- List of New South Wales representative cricketers
