= David Moore (cricket coach) =

Australian cricketer and coach

Personal information
- Full name: David John Arthur Moore
- Born: 16 October 1964 (age 62); Sydney, New South Wales, Australia
- Batting: Right-handed
- Role: Wicketkeeper

Domestic team information
- Years: Team
- 1986/87: New South Wales
- Only First-class: 12 December 1986 New South Wales v Western Australia

Career statistics
Competition	First-class
Matches	1
Runs scored	4
Batting average	4.00
100s/50s	0/0
Top score	4
Balls bowled	0
Wickets	–
Bowling average	–
5 wickets in innings	–
10 wickets in match	–
Best bowling	–
Catches/stumpings	0/0
- Source: CricketArchive, 7 November 2011

David John Arthur Moore (born 16 October 1964 in Sydney, New South Wales, Australia) is a former Australian state cricketer. He played as a wicketkeeper for New South Wales. An ACB Level Three accredited coach, Moore was appointed the head coach of the New South Wales (NSW) women's side in 2001, leading the team to victory in the Women's National Cricket League.

He was also coach of the Balmain Cricket Club in Sydney.

As a cricketer, he represented NSW at all levels, from colts to Sheffield Shield between 1983 and 1989. His state under-19 teammates included Steve and Mark Waugh, Mark Taylor, Gavin Robertson and Brad McNamara.

A wicket-keeper, Moore played first-grade cricket in Sydney with the St George and Waverley Cricket Clubs between 1984 and 1993, making his first-class debut in 1986–87.

In 2002 David Moore was appointed as senior coach of the Commonwealth Bank Cricket Academy (CBCA). Working alongside the likes of Bennett King and Troy Cooley. He later worked with King as assistant coach of the West Indies. He also formed a close coaching partnership at NSW level with the highly regarded Steve Thomlinson.

On 3 May 2007 it was confirmed that Moore would be head coach of the West Indies replacing his former boss Bennett King for the tour of England. He is appointed as a head of program of Bangladesh cricket board in 2023.

== See also ==
- Cricket Australia
- List of New South Wales representative cricketers
