= Nic Maddinson =

Australian cricketer

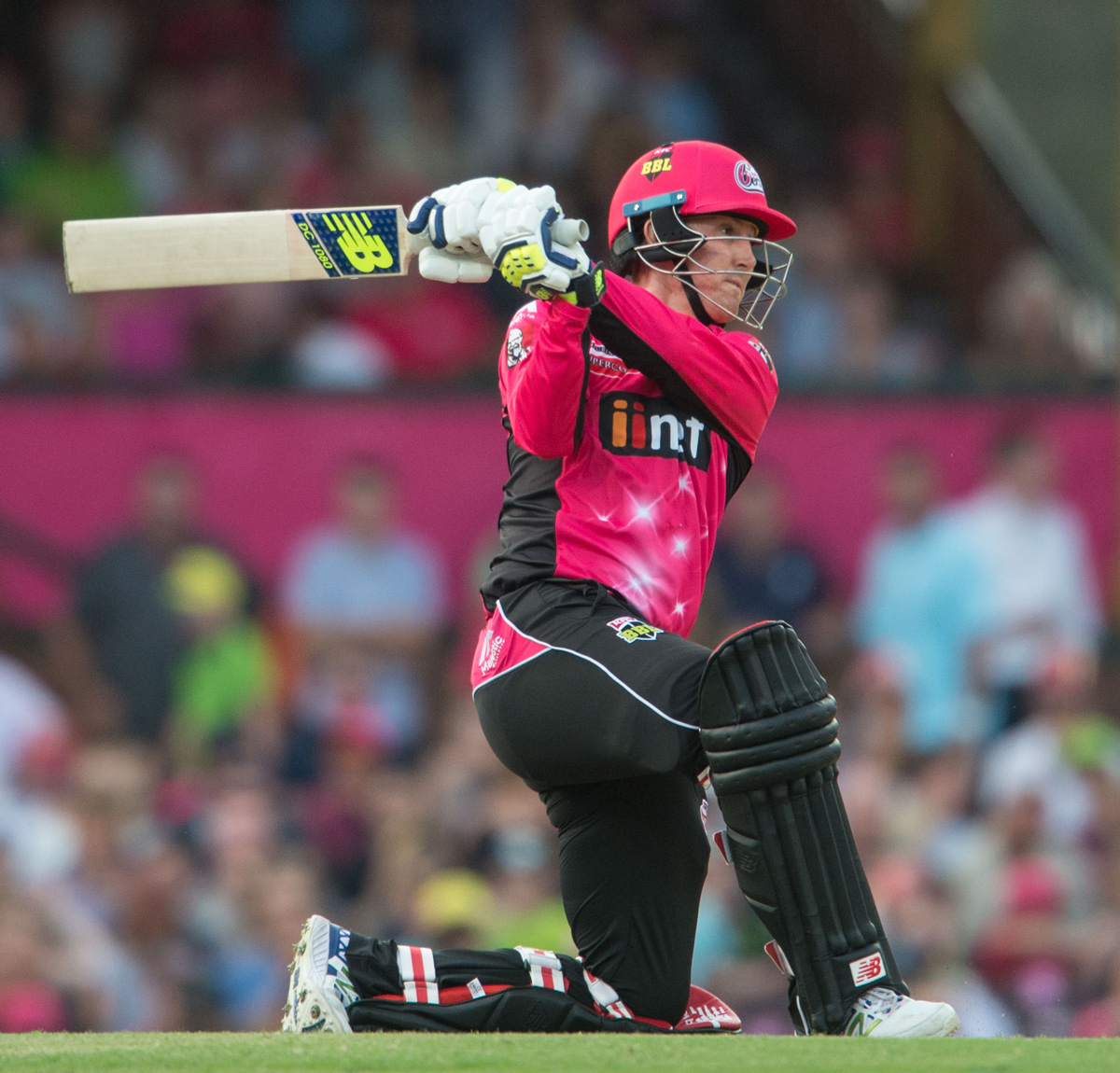
- Maddinson playing for Sydney Sixers

Personal information
- Full name: Nicolas James Maddinson
- Born: 21 December 1991 (age 34); Nowra, New South Wales, Australia
- Batting: Left-handed
- Bowling: Slow left-arm
- Role: Opening batsman

International information
- National side: Australia (2013–present)
- Test debut (cap 448): 24 November 2016 v South Africa
- Last Test: 18 October 2026 v South Africa
- T20I debut (cap 65): 10 October 2013 v India
- Last T20I: 6 July 2018 v Zimbabwe
- T20I shirt no.: 53

Domestic team information
- Years: Team
- 2010/11–2017/18, 2024/25-present: New South Wales (squad no. 53)
- 2011/12–2017/18: Sydney Sixers
- 2014–2015: Royal Challengers Bangalore
- 2016: Guyana Amazon Warriors
- 2018: Surrey
- 2018/19–2020/21: Melbourne Stars
- 2018/19–2023/24: Victoria (squad no. 53)
- 2021/22–2023/24: Melbourne Renegades
- 2022: Durham (squad no. 53)
- 2024/25-present: Sydney Thunder (squad no. 53)

Career statistics
Competition	Test	T20I	FC	LA
Matches	5	6	131	107
Runs scored	83	45	7,888	3,237
Batting average	10.37	11.25	36.68	32.69
100s/50s	0/0	0/0	18/36	7/17
Top score	48	34	224	137
Balls bowled	90	0	742	564
Wickets	0	0	8	8
Bowling average	0	0	63.87	64.25
5 wickets in innings	0	0	0	0
10 wickets in match	0	0	0	0
Best bowling	0	0	2/10	4/29
Catches/stumpings	3/–	1/–	93/–	47/–
- Source: Cricinfo, 18 October 2026

Nicolas James Maddinson (born 21 December 1991) is an Australian cricketer. He is a left-handed opening batsman who has represented Australia in both Test matches and Twenty20 Internationals. Domestically, he is the captain of New South Wales in the Sheffield Shield and plays for the Sydney Thunder in the Big Bash League, previously having played for Victoria, Melbourne Stars, Melbourne Renegades (as captain) and Sydney Sixers.

== Early life and cricket ==
Born on 21 December 1991 in Nowra, New South Wales, Maddinson was part of the New South Wales under-19 team that won the Australian under-19 Championship in December 2009. Two months earlier, he had topped the batting averages for Australia's under-19 team in a home series against Sri Lanka under-19s, averaging 72 runs and innings during the series, including scoring a century in one match. He was later selected for the Australian for the 2010 ICC Under-19 Cricket World Cup, opening the batting as Australia won the tournament.

Maddinson also enjoyed an excellent season for Sutherland District Cricket Club in 2009/10, scoring 604 runs at an average of 46.46 runs per innings. He scored two centuries, including making 137 runs in the semi-final against Eastern Suburbs Cricket Club, helping Sutherland reach the Grand Final, where they eventually lost to St George Cricket Club. he took 12 First Grade wickets during the season with his left-arm orthodox spin deliveries, including five wickets for 95 runs in the semi-final.

== Domestic cricket career ==
Maddinson made his first-class cricket debut in October 2011, scoring a century to become the youngest New South Wales player to score a century on first-class debut. His score of 113 runs against South Australia at the Adelaide Oval came aged 18 years and 294 days, beaten the record set by Arthur Morris in 1940 aged 18 years and 342 days.

Maddinson made his Big Bash League debut for Sydney Sixers in January 2011 and played for the team until the 2017/18 season. During the 2014/15 season he captained the team in five matches when Moisés Henriques was injured, He made his Indian Premier League debut in 2014 for Royal Challengers Bangalore, playing in just two matches before being ruled out of the competition due to injury. He rejoined the team in 2015 but played only once before playing for Guyana Amazon Warriors in the 2016 Caribbean Premier League, finishing on the losing team in the competition's final. In 2018 he played for Surrey County Cricket Club in the 2018 Vitality Blast.

Maddinson moved to play for Victoria ahead of the 2018/19 Australian season. He found a place in the team in the 2018–19 JLT One-Day Cup, playing in all eight matches and scoring two half-centuries. He was left out of the first five matches of the Sheffield Shield season but selected following Marcus Harris' selection in the Australian Test squad for the tour of India. He scored 162 runs on his Victoria Shield debut, but later broke his arm during a match, ruling him out for the finals. At the same time he moved to play for Victorian team Melbourne Stars in the Big Bash.

In 2019/20, Maddinson was the leading run scorer in the Sheffield Shield, making 780 runs at an average of 86.66 runs an innings. He made two centuries and five half-centuries and set a new highest first-class score of 224 runs. He was awarded the joint Shield player of the year award.

In 2024/25, Maddinson returned to play for New South Wales and also joined the Sydney Thunder in the BBL.

In March 2025, at the end of the 2024/25 cricket season, Maddinson was diagnosed with testicular cancer, for which he underwent surgery and nine weeks of chemotherapy. He resumed full cricket training in September after recovering from the cancer, and missed the early stages of the 2025/26 domestic season.

Maddinson was appointed as the captain of New South Wales in the Sheffield Shield for the 2026-27 season.

== International career ==
As a 19-year-old, Maddinson was selected in both the one-day and four-day Australia A squads for the 2011 tour of Zimbabwe, playing in three one-day matches in a tri-series with Zimbabwe and South Africa.

He went on to make his full international debut for Australia in a Twenty20 International match against India at Rajkot in October 2013, scoring 34 runs from 16 balls. In November 2016, Maddinson made his Test match debut in the third Test against the touring South Africans. His baggy green cap was presented by Simon Katich. He played in three Tests during the summer batting at number six, making a duck on debut against South Africa and then scores of 1, 4 and 22 in three innings against the touring Pakistan team before being dropped for the final Test of the summer.

In October 2026, Maddinson was called up to Australia's test squad for the tour of South Africa, three months short of a decade since his last test appearance. Maddinson's selection came as a surprise, given he had not played a first-class match for 19 months prior due to his cancer treatment.
