= Bankstown District Cricket Club =

- Nickname: The Bulldogs

Team information
- City: Bankstown
- Colours: Blue White
- Founded: 1951
- Home ground: Bankstown Oval
- Capacity: 8,000

History
- 1st Grade wins: 7 (1959, 1988, 1994, 1995, 2000, 2007, 2016 )
- 1st Grade Limited–Overs Cup wins: 5 (1996, 1998, 2007, 2015, 2016)
- 2nd Grade wins: 5 (1958, 1961, 1962, 1975, 1998)
- 3rd Grade wins: 4 (1953, 1967, 1979, 1990)
- 4th Grade wins: 1 (1972)
- 5th Grade wins: 1 (1977)
- Poidevin–Gray Shield wins: 4 (1954, 1961, 1990, 2014)
- AW Green Shield wins: 11 (1963, 1965, 1966, 1970, 1983, 1989, 1991, 1999, 2000, 2014, 2015)
- Official website: Bankstown District Cricket Club

Bankstown District Cricket Club is a cricket club based in Bankstown, New South Wales, Australia. Founded in 1951, the Bulldogs joined the Sydney Grade Cricket Competition in 1952.

The club's home ground is Bankstown Oval, and it has won 7 first grade premierships.

The club's most famous players include all four Waugh brothers (Steve, Mark, Dean and Danny), Jeff Thomson, Len Pascoe, Trevor Chappell, Corey Richards, Mark Stoneman and Aaron Bird.
