= University of NSW Cricket Club =

University of New South Wales Cricket Club
- Nickname: Bumble Bees

Personnel
- Captain: Geoff Lawson
- 1st XI captain: David Dawson
- Coach: Corey Richards
- Batting coach: Murray Creed

Team information
- Colours: Black and Gold
- Founded: 1951
- Home ground: Village Green
- Capacity: 5,000

History
- 1st Grade wins: 2 (1977, 1981)
- 1st Grade Limited–Overs Cup wins: 1 (2005)
- 2nd Grade wins: 1 (1978)
- 3rd Grade wins: 0
- 4th Grade wins: 0
- 5th Grade wins: 1 (1996)
- Poidevin–Gray Shield wins: 1 (1977)
- Kingsgrove Sports T20 Cup wins: 0
- Official website: https://unswcricketclub.com

University of New South Wales Cricket Club is a cricket club associated with the University of New South Wales, New South Wales, Australia. They are also known as the Bumble Bees and play in the Sydney Grade Cricket competition. They were founded in 1951, beginning in the Municipal and Sydney Shires Cricket competition and entered the Sydney Grade Cricket competition in 1973.

In the current season, 2018 to 2019, UNSWCC has fielded five graded sides plus one in the Metropolitan Cup competition, which is akin to 6th grade. It also has a First Grade Limited over plus T20 sides. In addition to these, Poidevin-Gray and A.W. Green Shield sides represent the UNSWCC and are development pathways for emerging young talent. The University offers a range of scholarships for commencing students who are involved in the club, "both on and off the field".

== Notable players ==
In the club's history, there have been several notable players. These include:

- Tom Cooper
- Murray Creed
- Daniel Christian
- David Dawson
- Tim Lang
- Geoffrey 'Henry' Lawson
- Katie Mack
- Michael Slater
- Chris Tremain

== See also ==
- History of Australian cricket
