= Welham =

Welham or Wellham may refer to:

== Places ==
- Welham, Leicestershire, England
- Welham, North Yorkshire, England
- Welham, Nottinghamshire, England
- Welham, Somerset, England; a UK location in the parish of Shepton Montague
- Welham Boys' School, India
- Welham Girls' School, India

== People with the surname ==
- Kris Welham (born 1987), English rugby league player
- Tom Welham, British musician
- Dirk Wellham (born 1959), Australian cricketer
- Wally Wellham (born 1932), Australian cricketer
