= Aaron Bird =

Australian cricketer

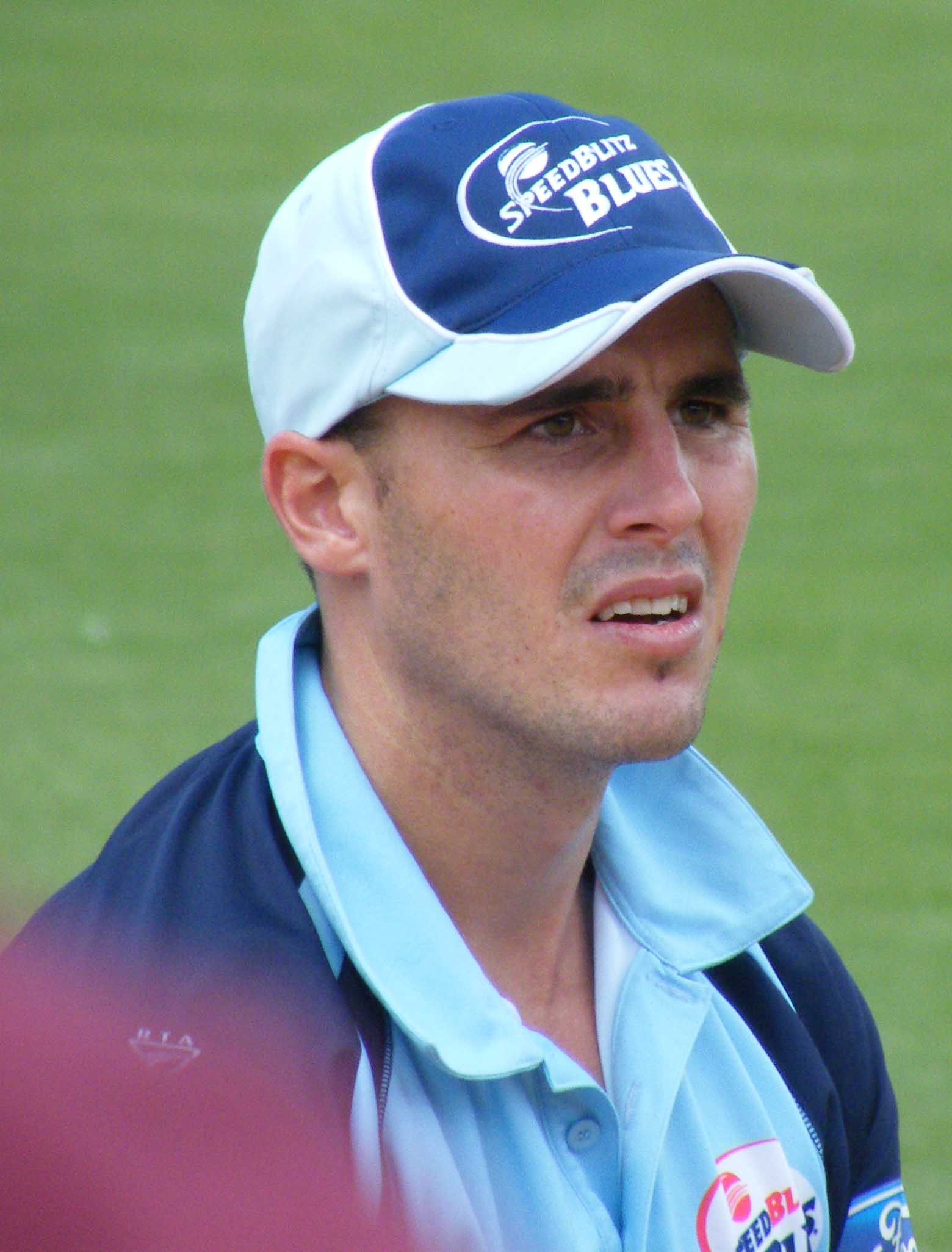

Personal information
- Full name: Aaron Christopher Bird
- Born: 28 September 1983 (age 43); Taree, New South Wales, Australia
- Height: 1.82 m (6 ft 0 in)
- Batting: Right-handed
- Bowling: Right-arm fast
- Role: Bowler

Domestic team information
- Years: Team
- 2005/06–2009/10: New South Wales

Career statistics
Competition	FC	LA	T20
Matches	6	25	12
Runs scored	101	65	29
Batting average	14.42	8.12	9.66
100s/50s	0/0	0/0	0/0
Top score	29	12*	17*
Balls bowled	857	1,122	238
Wickets	14	34	21
Bowling average	41.78	30.91	17.42
5 wickets in innings	0	1	0
10 wickets in match	0	0	0
Best bowling	4/80	5/26	3/21
Catches/stumpings	1/–	7/–	5/–
- Source: ESPN cricinfo, 23 April 2023

Aaron Christopher Bird (born 28 September 1983) is an Australian former cricketer who played first-class cricket for New South Wales. He played as a right-handed batsman and a right-arm fast bowler.

Bird arrived from Taree, NSW as a 16-year-old to play Sydney Grade Cricket with North Sydney Cricket Club, eventually going on to play First Grade as an 18-year-old. In this time with North Sydney, Bird hit the headlines when he hit former Test batsman Michael Slater injuring the former test star in the process. Bird now plays his cricket with Bankstown Cricket Club, former home of the Waugh brothers.

Bird caused controversy after appearing in a Twenty20 match, in which players wore nicknames on their shirts, with the moniker 'Flu' – a reference to bird flu. He was ordered not to wear the name again, as it might anger the sponsors of the tournament, KFC.

In December 2006 Bird was reported for a suspect bowling action but was later cleared by Cricket Australia. In January 2009, his bowling action was again reported. After undergoing analysis at the Australian Institute of Sport biomechanics laboratory in Canberra it was found that for some deliveries his elbow extension exceeded the 15-degree limit, he was subsequently banned by Cricket Australia. After being mentioned by the umpires in a Blues' Twenty20 match in January 2010, Bird ended his first-class career in April 2010; he would continue to play grade cricket for Canterbury-Bankstown.
