= North Sydney (disambiguation) =

North Sydney is a suburb and commercial district on the Lower North Shore of Sydney, New South Wales, Australia. It is also the namesake of:

- North Sydney Council, a local government area in Sydney
  - Division of North Sydney, an electoral division serving the suburb
- North Sydney Bears, a professional rugby league football club of North Sydney, NSW
- North Sydney Cricket Club
- North Sydney Oval, a multi-use sporting facility in North Sydney, NSW

It may also refer to a place in Nova Scotia, Canada:

- North Sydney, Nova Scotia, a region of the Cape Breton Regional Municipality in Canada
