= NSW Premier Cricket =

Cricket competition in Sydney, Australia

- Countries: Australia
- Administrator: Sydney Cricket Association
- Format: Two-day, One-day, Twenty20
- First edition: 1893/94
- Latest edition: 2024/25
- Next edition: 2025/26
- Current champion: Parramatta (6th first-grade title)
- Most successful: St George (18 first-grade titles)
- Most runs: Greg Mail (15,242)
- Most wickets: Hugh Chilvers (1,153)
- Website: https://www.cricketnsw.com.au/premier-cricket

NSW Premier Cricket, formerly and still commonly known as Sydney Grade Cricket is a cricket competition played in Greater Sydney and is highest level club cricket competition in the Australian state of New South Wales. The competition began in 1893 when a number of clubs that had been playing for many years on an ad hoc basis voted to create a formal competition structure.

The NSW Premier Cricket competition is played on turf wickets on Saturdays. It begins in mid-September and continues until the grand final is played on the first weekend of April. Spectators are mostly few and far between at matches, mostly family members, partners or club members. The exception to this is at T20 matches which can attract crowds into the hundreds and occasionally the low thousands. Generally, players for New South Wales are selected from the first-grade competition, and whilst modern day cricketers have few breaks outside the international calendar, when they do, NSW players will often return to play in the first-grade competition.

== History ==
=== Origins ===
The origins of NSW Premier Cricket date back to April 1859, when a public advertisement in the Sydney Morning Herald called on local social cricket clubs to convene with the goal of forming a formal association. This initiative led to the establishment of the New South Wales Cricket Association in December 1859, with one of its principal aims being to organise local cricket more systematically to strengthen the colony's representative team, which had begun competing against Victoria in 1856.

By the 1880s, a loosely structured Sydney club cricket competition had emerged. While some clubs were locality-based—such as Bathurst, Carlingford, Petersham, and Stanmore, the more dominant teams were non-localised, including Albert, Belvidere, Carlton, Incogniti, University, and Warwick. As Sydney's population expanded and municipal councils developed new parks and sporting grounds in emerging suburbs, the infrastructure improved, allowing the NSWCA to further expand organised cricket.

In response to continued growth and the desire for a more community-based structure, the NSWCA voted unanimously on 22 May 1893 to establish a new club competition based on electoral boundaries. This initiative marked the formal beginning of what was then known as 'Electoral Cricket' and later evolved into Sydney Grade Cricket, now known as NSW Premier Cricket, with the first matches beginning on 7 October 1893.

The inaugural 1893/94 season featured eight teams: East Sydney, Glebe, Manly, Paddington, Sydney University, Central Cumberland, Redfern, and Canterbury. The first premiers East Sydney, winners of the 'Hordern Shield'. Although club boundaries were linked to New South Wales Legislative Assembly electorates, Sydney University was allowed to participate despite lacking a corresponding electorate. The competition expanded rapidly, Four more clubs, Waverley, North Sydney, South Sydney, and Leichhardt, were added in the 1894–95 season, increasing the total to 12. The competition's success led to the creation of a Second Grade in 1895–96 and a Third Grade in 1899–1900, laying the foundation for the modern multi-tiered structure of NSW Premier Cricket.

Additionally, in 1921 the NSW Cricket Association decided to expand the first-grade competition to 16 teams with the admission of four news clubs, Marrickville, Mosman, Randwick and St George.

=== Later history ===
This competition has grown substantially since its formation and by 1985 the Sydney Grade Cricket Competition encompassed 20 clubs. Since the 1940s there had been a number of club mergers (Petersham with Marrickville and Glebe with South Sydney followed in 1965 by the forced merger of Paddington with Glebe-South Sydney to form Sydney District CC). In 1965 Sutherland joined the competition, followed by Nepean (now Penrith) and University of NSW in 1973. In 1985 Sydney District CC left the competition but 3 new clubs from the outer suburbs of Sydney joined - Fairfield, Campbelltown and Hawkesbury. In the late 1990s there was a push to remove some inner-city clubs from the competition, but although no clubs were forced out, in 2001 Randwick and Petersham-Marrickville (itself the product of a merger in 1951) decided to merge and formed the Randwick Petersham club. Some clubs were renamed to reflect their wider representation (Waverley renamed as Eastern Suburbs, Fairfield becoming Fairfield-Liverpool and Campbelltown becoming Campbelltown-Camden). Finally in 2002 Blacktown were promoted from the second-tier shires competition to bring the number of clubs back up to 20. Each of the 20 clubs fields a side in each of the five senior grades as well as a side in the Poidevin-Gray Shield and AW Green Shield junior competitions.

In recent times some clubs have started broadcasting scorecards in real-time on the Cricket Australia website. Some clubs also have detailed video and photographs each weekend. Most but not all clubs actively update their website and have information across a variety of social media platforms.

Sydney grade cricket also has a history of welcoming budding, current or former first-class and Test cricketers from around the world. Players are primarily sourced from England's county competition. In 2015/16, there were over 10 players in the competition plying their trade in the first-grade competition. In the late 1990s and early 2000s Kevin Pietersen and Andrew Strauss amongst others played seasons in Sydney. Such is the strength of the competition that some well-known players have been known to play multiple matches in second grade.

To address shortcomings in players making the transition from first-grade to State cricket, two seasons ago a different type of ball was introduced into the first-grade competition. This ball is the same used by state players but had not previously been used due to its cost (A$150 each). While the ball is still a four-piece ball, its seam is less pronounced and more difficult to swing. Bowlers, in particular fast bowlers, have had to work much harder at getting wickets. Since its introduction scores within the competition have increased. There have been higher team and individual scores (400+ scores by teams are not the rare occurrence they once were).

In the 2016/17 season, the competition changed its name to NSW Premier Cricket. The name change was part of a Cricket Australia initiative to standardise the naming of the elite men's cricket competition within each state's capital city.

== Clubs ==
=== Current clubs ===
Colours	Club	Established	First season	Home ground	First-grade premierships	Note
	Bankstown	1951	1951/52	Bankstown Oval	7 (1958/59, 1987/88, 1993/94, 1994/95, 1999/2000, 2006/07, 2015/16)	Nicknamed the Bulldogs, and originally known as Bankstown-Canterbury until 1999.
	Blacktown	1894	2002/03	Joe McAleer Oval	0	Nicknamed the Warriors, Blacktown participated in the Sydney Shires Competition before entering the Sydney Grade competition in 2002/03.
	Campbelltown-Camden	1985	1985/86	Raby Sports Complex	0	Nicknamed the Ghosts, the club won its first title (the first grade limited overs crown) in 1986/87.
	Eastern Suburbs	1894	1894/95	Waverley Oval	8 (1902/03, 1920/21, 1921/22, 1922/23, 1944/45, 1975/76, 1991/92, 2003/04)	Nicknamed the Dolphins, they were founded as the Waverley District Cricket Club in 1894, it changed its name in 1996 to reflect a broader regional basis.
	Fairfield-Liverpool	1985	1985/86	Rosedale Oval	2 (2001/02, 2005/06)	Nicknamed the Lions.
	Gordon	1905	1905/06	Chatswood Oval	6 (1910/11, 1923/24, 1945/46, 1947/48, 1989/90, 1990/91)	Nicknamed the Stags.
	Hawkesbury	1985	1985/86	Bensons Lane Complex	0	Nicknamed the Hawks.
	Manly Warringah	1878	1893/94	Manly Oval	5 (1949/50, 1957/58, 1973/74, 1988/89, 2014/15)	Nicknamed the Waratahs, they were originally known as Manly from 1893/94 to 1894/95 and from 1921/22 to 1950/51 and Middle Harbour from 1905/06 to 1920/21.
	Mosman	1908	1921/22	Allan Border Oval	5 (1929/30, 1933/34, 1935/36, 1938/39, 2021/22)	Nicknamed the Whales.
	North Sydney	1894	1894/95	North Sydney Oval	5 (1898/99, 1904/05, 1907/08, 1912/13, 1931/32)	Nicknamed the Bears.
	Northern District	1925	1925/26	Mark Taylor Oval	6 (1948/49, 1962/63, 1966/67, 1985/86, 1986/87, 1992/93)	Nicknamed the Rangers.
	Parramatta	1843	1893/94	Old Kings Oval	6 (1899/1900, 1932/33, 1964/65, 2017/18, 2022/23, 2024/25)	Formerly known as Central Cumberland until 1983.
	Penrith	1973	1973/74	Howell Oval	3 (1978/79, 1982/83, 2018/19)	Like the local rugby league team, the Penrith District Cricket Club are nicknamed the Panthers, they were known as Nepean until 1978.
	Randwick Petersham	2001	2001/02	Coogee Oval	1 (2019/20)	Nicknamed the Randy Petes, they won the first grade premiership in 2019/20, following on from 7 titles won by Randwick and 4 by Petersham-Marrickville, the clubs who merged in 2001.
	St George	1911	1921/22	Hurstville Oval	18 (1939/40, 1940/41, 1941/42, 1942/43, 1952/53, 1960/61, 1965/66, 1968/69, 1969/70, 1970/71, 1984/85, 1996/97, 2000/01, 2007/08, 2008/09, 2009/10, 2012/13, 2023/24)	Nicknamed the Saints.
	Sutherland	1965	1965/66	Glenn McGrath Oval	2 (1995/96, 1997/98)	
	Sydney	1897	1900	Drummoyne Oval	5 (1915/16, 1936/37, 1967/68, 1998/99, 2020/21)	Nicknamed the Tigers, they were originally formed as a lower-grades club but were promoted to first-grade after a merger with Leichhardt, who competed in first-grade from 1894 to 1899, they were then known as Leichhardt-Balmain from 1900 to 1903, Balmain from 1904 to 2000, and UTS-Balmain from 2001 to 2006.
	Sydney University	1864	1893/94	University Oval	9 (1909/10, 1911/12, 1913/14, 2002/03, 2004/05, 2010/11, 2011/12, 2013/14, 2016/17)	Nicknamed the Students, it was a foundation member of the grade competition in 1893.
	University of NSW	1973	1973/74	David Phillips Sports Field	2 (1976/77, 1980/81)	Nicknamed the Bumble Bees.
	Western Suburbs	1895	1895/86	Pratten Park	11 (1903/04, 1905/06, 1914/15, 1919/20, 1928/29, 1946/47, 1956/57, 1959/60, 1963/64, 1971/72, 1972/73)	Nicknamed the Magpies, they were originally known as Burwood until 1913.

=== Former clubs ===
Colours	Club	First season	Last season	Home ground	First-grade premierships	Note
	Canterbury	1893/94	1894/95	?	0	
	East Sydney	1893/94	1899/00	?	1	
	Glebe	1893/94	1964/65	Wentworth Park	5	Known as Glebe-South Sydney from 1951/52 onwards, it later merged with Paddington to form Sydney.
	Marrickville	1921/22	1950/51	Marrickville Oval	1	Merged with Petersham to form Petersham-Marrickville in 1951.
	Paddington	1893/94	1964/65	Trumper Oval	9	Merged with Glebe-South Sydney to form Sydney in 1965.
	Petersham	1907/08	1950/51	Petersham Oval	1	Merged with Marrickville to form Petersham-Marrickville in 1951.
	Petersham-Marrickville	1951/52	2000/01	Petersham Oval	4	Formed as a merger between Petersham and Marrickville, it subsequently merged with Randwick to form Randwick-Petersham in 2001.
	Randwick	1920/21	2000/01	Coogee Oval	7	Merged with Petersham-Marrickville in 2001.
	Redfern	1893/94	1915/16	Redfern Oval	0	
	South Sydney	1894/95	1899/00	?	0	
	Sydney	1900/01	1924/25	?	3	
	Sydney	1965/66	1983/84	?	0	Formed as a merger between Glebe-South Sydney and Paddington.

== Competition format ==
The competition consists of 20 clubs who field one side in each of the five grades. In the 1st Grade competition, each side plays every other side over a total of 19 rounds. All other grades play only 15 rounds, thus missing out on playing 4 teams each season. The additional 4 rounds that are played by the 1st Grade sides are generally one day matches that take place on Sundays (won by Sydney University in 2010/2011).

The 2010/11 season, for all grades, included 10 two-day matches (generally played on two consecutive Saturdays), 4 one-day matches and 1 Twenty-20 match. The 1st Grade sides played an additional one-day match and 3 Twenty20 matches. The 1st Grade Draw can be found here and the 2nd Grade draw, which is identical to the 3rd, 4th and 5th Grade draws, can be found here .

The final series generally consists of Qualifying Finals, Semi-Finals and a Final. These matches are played over two days, with the First Grade Final being played over three days. In the Qualifying Finals, the 1st placed team plays the 6th placed team, 2nd plays 5th and 3rd plays 4th. The three winning teams (or better placed team in the case of a draw) and the best placed losing team go through to the Semi-Finals.

Points are allocated to the teams according to the results of each match. These points go towards the Club Championship which is awarded at the end of the regular season.

All of the current NSW first-class cricket players are selected from their performances in Premier Cricket. This includes those players who also represent Australia although the demands of the international schedule means the Australian players rarely get to play at grade level these days.

== Premiers ==
Sydney Grade Cricket Premiers 1893/94-2024/25
Season	Belvidere Cup (1st Grade)	1st Grade One Day Cup	1st Grade T20 Cup	Albert Cup (2nd Grade)	Mitchell Cup (3rd Grade)	Reid Cup (4th Grade)	David Sherwood Cup (5th Grade)
1893/94	East Sydney						
1894/95	Paddington						
1895/96	Glebe			North Sydney			
1896/97	Glebe			Paddington			
1897/98	Paddington			Burwood			
1898/99	North Sydney			University			
1899/1900	Central Cumberland			Burwood	Central Cumberland		
1900/01	Paddington			Paddington	Leichhardt-Balmain		
1901/02	Sydney			University	North Sydney		
1902/03	Waverley			Leichhardt-Balmain	Manly		
1903/04	Burwood			Sydney	Paddington		
1904/05	North Sydney			Manly	North Sydney		
1905/06	Burwood			Petersham	North Sydney		
1906/07	Paddington			North Sydney	Paddington		
1907/08	North Sydney			North Sydney	North Sydney		
1908/09	Glebe			Mosman	North Sydney		
1909/10	University			North Sydney	North Sydney		
1910/11	Gordon			Marrickville	North Sydney		
1911/12	University			University	North Sydney		
1912/13	North Sydney			Waverley	Waverley		
1913/14	University			Waverley	Randwick		
1914/15	Western Suburbs			Waverley	Waverley		
1915/16	Balmain			Randwick	Newtown		
1916/17	Sydney			Newtown	Balmain		
1917/18	Petersham			Mosman	Petersham		
1918/19	Paddington			Mosman	Mosman		
1919/20	Western Suburbs			Randwick	Waverley		
1920/21	Waverley			Marrickville	Manly		
1921/22	Waverley			Waverley	Western Suburbs		
1922/23	Waverley			Marrickville	Waverley		
1923/24	Gordon			Waverley	Marrickville		
1924/25	Sydney			Petersham	Gordon		
1925/26	Paddington			Gordon	Petersham, Paddington & Gordon		
1926/27	Glebe			Petersham	St. George		
1927/28	Glebe			Western Suburbs	St. George		
1928/29	Western Suburbs			Waverley	Western Suburbs		
1929/30	Mosman			St. George	Waverley		
1930/31	Randwick			Randwick	Randwick		
1931/32	North Sydney			Western Suburbs	Marrickville		
1932/33	Central Cumberland			Petersham	Randwick		
1933/34	Mosman			Randwick	Randwick		
1934/35	Paddington			Western Suburbs	Glebe	Waverley	
1935/36	Mosman			Western Suburbs	Randwick	Western Suburbs	
1936/37	Balmain			Western Suburbs	Randwick	Marrickville	
1937/38	Randwick			Glebe	Western Suburbs	No Competition	
1938/39	Mosman			Waverley	Western Suburbs	Western Suburbs	
1939/40	St. George			St. George	Western Suburbs	Western Suburbs	
1940/41	St. George			Waverley	Gordon	No Competition	
1941/42	St. George			Waverley	Balmain & Gordon	No Competition	
1942/43	St. George			St. George	Randwick	No Competition	
1943/44	Marrickville			Western Suburbs	Randwick	No Competition	
1944/45	Waverley			Glebe	Petersham	No Competition	
1945/46	Gordon			Waverley	Western Suburbs	No Competition	
1946/47	Western Suburbs			Balmain	Gordon	No Competition	
1947/48	Gordon			Western Suburbs	Central Cumberland	No Competition	
1948/49	Northern Districts			Waverley	Western Suburbs	Mosman	
1949/50	Manly Warringah			Waverley	Northern Districts	St. George	
1950/51	Paddington			Balmain	St. George	Mosman	
1951/52	Randwick			Waverley	Petersham-Marrickville	Petersham-Marrickville	
1952/53	St. George			Waverley	Bankstown-Canterbury	Cumberland	
1953/54	Paddington			Glebe-South Sydney	Glebe-South Sydney	St. George	
1954/55	Petersham-Marrickville			Balmain	St. George	Balmain	
1955/56	Petersham-Marrickville			Paddington	St. George	Randwick	
1956/57	Western Suburbs			St. George	Mosman	Waverley	
1957/58	Manly-Warringah			Bankstown-Canterbury	Western Suburbs	Randwick	
1958/59	Bankstown-Canterbury			Central Cumberland	Manly-Warringah	Gordon	
1959/60	Western Suburbs			Northern Districts	Central Cumberland	Gordon	
1960/61	St. George			Bankstown-Canterbury	Gordon	Western Suburbs	
1961/62	Petersham-Marrickville			Bankstown-Canterbury	St. George	Bankstown-Canterbury	
1962/63	Northern Districts			University	St. George	St. George	
1963/64	Western Suburbs			University	Petersham-Marrickville	St. George	
1964/65	Central Cumberland			University	Central Cumberland	St. George	
1965/66	St. George			St. George	Gordon	Sutherland	
1966/67	Northern Districts			Western Suburbs	Bankstown-Canterbury	St. George	
1967/68	Balmain	Western Suburbs		Sutherland	Sutherland	Sutherland	
1968/69	St. George	St. George		Waverley	Petersham-Marrickville	North Sydney	
1969/70	St. George	Sutherland		St. George	Manly-Warringah	Balmain	Northern Districts
1970/71	St. George	Balmain		Balmain	St. George	Gordon	Gordon
1971/72	Western Suburbs	Manly-Warringah		St. George	Northern Districts	Bankstown-Canterbury	Northern Districts
1972/73	Western Suburbs	Newcastle		Northern Districts	Central Cumberland	Manly-Warringah	St. George
1973/74	Manly-Warringah	Gordon		Central Cumberland	Central Cumberland	Central Cumberland	Central Cumberland
1974/75	Petersham-Marrickville	Western Suburbs		Bankstown-Canterbury	Manly-Warringah	Gordon	North Sydney
1975/76	Waverley	Balmain		Central Cumberland	Sutherland	Mosman-Middle Harbour	Gordon
1976/77	University of NSW	No Competition		North Sydney	Petersham-Marrickville	Sydney University	Bankstown-Canterbury
1977/78	Randwick	No Competition		University of NSW	Western Suburbs	Randwick	Balmain
1978/79	Penrith	No Competition		Randwick	Bankstown-Canterbury	Randwick	Sutherland
1979/80	Randwick	No Competition		Sydney University	Randwick	Petersham-Marrickville	Balmain
1980/81	University of NSW	No Competition		Waverley	Sydney University	Sydney University	Sydney University
1981/82	Randwick	No Competition		Balmain	Petersham-Marrickville	Petersham-Marrickville	Sydney University
1982/83	Penrith	No Competition		Northern Districts	Gordon	Western Suburbs	Western Suburbs
1983/84	Randwick	No Competition		Northern Districts	North Sydney	St. George	St. George
1984/85	St. George	No Competition		North Sydney	Randwick	Penrith	Randwick
1985/86	Northern Districts	North Sydney		North Sydney	Gordon	Mosman-Middle Harbour	Randwick
1986/87	Northern Districts	Campbelltown		St. George	Sutherland	Sutherland	Sutherland
1987/88	Bankstown-Canterbury	North Sydney		St. George	Manly-Warringah	Western Suburbs	Sydney University
1988/89	Manly-Warringah	No Competition		St. George	Sutherland	Sydney University	Sydney University
1989/90	Gordon	No Competition		Manly-Warringah	Bankstown-Canterbury	Balmain	Parramatta
1990/91	Gordon	No Competition		North Sydney	Randwick	Gordon	Randwick
1991/92	Waverley	No Competition		Parramatta	Parramatta	Gordon	Gordon
1992/93	Northern Districts	North Sydney		Penrith	Randwick	Randwick	Campbelltown
1993/94	Bankstown-Canterbury	Randwick		North Sydney	St. George	Sutherland	Western Suburbs
1994/95	Bankstown-Canterbury	North Sydney		Hawkesbury	Sydney University	Sydney University	Hawkesbury
1995/96	Sutherland	Bankstown-Canterbury		Sutherland	Randwick	Randwick	University of NSW
1996/97	St. George	Randwick		Sutherland	Eastern Suburbs	Parramatta	Penrith
1997/98	Sutherland	Bankstown-Canterbury		Bankstown-Canterbury	Sydney University	Randwick	Randwick
1998/99	Balmain	Penrith		Penrith	Sutherland	Eastern Suburbs	Sydney University
1999/2000	Bankstown-Canterbury	St. George		Northern Districts	St. George	Sutherland	Sutherland
2000/01	St. George	Manly-Warringah		North Sydney	Balmain	Mosman	Sutherland
2001/02	Fairfield-Liverpool	Penrith		Northern Districts	Gordon	Sutherland	Sydney University
2002/03	Sydney University	Sutherland		St. George	Penrith	Randwick Petersham	Sydney University
2003/04	Eastern Suburbs	Eastern Suburbs		Mosman	Randwick Petersham	Mosman	Campbelltown-Camden
2004/05	Sydney University	University of NSW		Randwick Petersham	Manly-Warringah	Gordon	Parramatta
2005/06	Fairfield-Liverpool	Manly-Warringah		Northern Districts	St. George	Randwick Petersham	Randwick Petersham
2006/07	Bankstown	Bankstown		Mosman	Sutherland	Sutherland	Fairfield-Liverpool
2007/08	St. George	Northern Districts & Eastern Suburbs		Sydney University	Campbelltown-Camden	Randwick Petersham	Randwick Petersham
2008/09	St. George	Mosman	Northern Districts	Sydney University	Gordon	Fairfield-Liverpool	Campbelltown-Camden
2009/10	St. George	Sutherland	Manly-Warringah	St. George	Parramatta	Sutherland	Campbelltown-Camden
2010/11	Sydney University	Sydney University	Sydney	North Sydney	Manly-Warringah	Sydney	Manly-Warringah
2011/12	Sydney University	Randwick Petersham	Randwick Petersham	Sydney University	Sutherland	Sutherland	Gordon
2012/13	St. George	North Sydney	Fairfield-Liverpool	Sydney University	Gordon	St. George	Gordon
2013/14	Sydney University	Northern Districts	Randwick Petersham	Sydney University	Northern Districts	Eastern Suburbs	Penrith
2014/15	Manly-Warringah	Bankstown	St. George	Sydney University	Manly-Warringah	Penrith	Northern Districts
2015/16	Bankstown	Bankstown	Randwick Petersham	Sydney	Sydney University	Sydney University	Campbelltown-Camden
2016/17	Sydney University	Penrith	Northern Districts	Sydney	Northern Districts	Sydney	Randwick Petersham
2017/18	Parramatta	Sydney University	Sydney	Northern Districts	Sydney University	Manly-Warringah	Manly-Warringah
2018/19	Penrith	Sydney	Sutherland	Sydney University	Eastern Suburbs	St. George	Sutherland
2019/20	Randwick Petersham	Sydney University	Sydney	Bankstown	Sydney University	Sydney University	UTS North Sydney
2020/21	Sydney	Randwick Petersham	Bankstown	Manly-Warringah	Northern District	Sutherland	Northern District
2021/22	Mosman	No competition	Randwick Petersham	Mosman	Northern District	Manly-Warringah	Eastern Suburbs
2022/23	Parramatta	Northern District	Sydney				
2023/24	St. George	Northern District	Randwick Petersham				
2024/25	Parramatta	Randwick Petersham	St. George				

== Poidevin-Gray Shield ==
The Poidevin-Gray Shield, or PG's as it is more commonly known, comprises teams who represent their grade sides in an Under 21 competition. All points received in this competition go towards the Club Championship.

Poideven-Gray Shield Premiers 1926/27- 2020/21
Season	Premiers
1926/27	Waverley
1927/28	Balmain
1928/29	Waverley
1929/30	Balmain
1930/31	Randwick
1931/32	Waverley
1932/33	Marrickville
1933/34	Northern Districts
1934/35	Glebe
1935/36	Gordon
1936/37	Marrickville
1937/38	Marrickville
1938/39	St. George
1939/40	Glebe
1940/41	St. George
1941/42	No Competition
1942/43	No Competition
1943/44	No Competition
1944/45	No Competition
1945/46	No Competition
1946/47	Paddington
1947/48	Paddington
1948/49	Mosman
1949/50	Manly
1950/51	St. George
1951/52	Petersham-Marrickville
1952/53	St. George
1953/54	Petersham-Marrickville
1954/55	St. George
1955/56	St. George & Manly
1956/57	Gordon
1957/58	St. George
1958/59	Glebe
1959/60	Mosman
1960/61	Bankstown-Canterbury
1961/62	Petersham-Marrickville
1962/63	St. George
1963/64	Western Suburbs
1964/65	Glebe-South Sydney
1965/66	Sydney
1966/67	St. George
1967/68	Randwick
1968/69	Manly
1969/70	Northern Districts
1970/71	Sydney
1971/72	Waverley
1972/73	Petersham-Marrickville
1973/74	Mosman-Middle Harbour
1974/75	Gordon
1975/76	St. George
1976/77	University of NSW
1977/78	Manly
1978/79	Northern Districts & Western Suburbs
1979/80	Northern Districts
1980/81	St. George & Northern Districts
1981/82	Mosman-Middle Harbour
1982/83	Central Cumberland
1983/84	Penrith
1984/85	North Sydney
1985/86	Manly-Warringah
1986/87	Mosman-Middle Harbour
1987/88	Sutherland
1988/89	Bankstown-Canterbury
1989/90	Bankstown-Canterbury
1990/91	Campbelltown
1991/92	St. George
1992/93	Campbelltown
1993/94	Fairfield-Liverpool
1994/95	Campbelltown
1995/96	Campbelltown
1996/97	Sydney University
1997/98	Fairfield-Liverpool
1998/99	Sutherland
1999/2000	Northern Districts
2000/01	Penrith
2001/02	Northern Districts
2002/03	Northern Districts
2003/04	St. George
2004/05	St. George
2005/06	Hawkesbury
2006/07	St. George
2007/08	St. George
2008/09	Bankstown
2009/10	Penrith
2010/11	Sydney University
2011/12	Sutherland
2012/13	Parramatta
2013/14	Bankstown
2014/15	Sutherland
2015/16	Sutherland
2016/17	Parramatta
2017/18	Penrith
2018/19	Mosman
2019/20	Fairfield-Liverpool
2020/21	Gordon & Parramatta
2021/22	Sutherland

== A W Green Shield ==
The A W Green Shield, or Greenies as it is more commonly known, comprises teams who represent their grade sides in an Under 16 competition consisting of 7 preliminary rounds, qualifying finals, semi-finals and a Final.

AW Green Shield Premiers 1936/37 - 2022/23
Season	Premiers
1936/37	Western Suburbs
1937/38	St. George
1938/39	St. George
1939/40	St. George
1940/41	St. George
1941/42	Manly
1942/43	Manly
1943/44	Waverley
1944/45	Manly
1945/46	Paddington
1946/47	Paddington
1947/48	Paddington
1948/49	St. George
1949/50	Randwick
1950/51	Gordon
1951/52	Gordon
1952/53	Manly & Waverley
1953/54	Manly
1954/55	Paddington
1955/56	St. George & Gordon
1956/57	Balmain
1957/58	Illawarra
1958/59	Illawarra
1959/60	Manly-Warringah
1960/61	Cumberland
1961/62	Mosman
1962/63	Bankstown-Canterbury
1963/64	Waverley
1964/65	Bankstown-Canterbury
1965/66	Bankstown-Canterbury
1966/67	Balmain
1967/68	Petersham-Marrickville & Sydney
1968/69	Northern Districts
1969/70	Bankstown-Canterbury & Northern Districts
1970/71	Sutherland
1971/72	Petersham-Marrickville
1972/73	St. George
1973/74	Western Suburbs
1974/75	St. George
1975/76	Central Cumberland & Western Suburbs
1976/77	Waverley
1977/78	Northern Districts
1978/79	Northern Districts
1979/80	Balmain
1980/81	St. George
1981/82	Mosman-Middle Harbour
1982/83	Bankstown-Canterbury
1983/84	St. George
1984/85	Sutherland
1985/86	Sutherland
1986/87	Gordon & Sutherland
1987/88	St. George
1988/89	Bankstown-Canterbury
1989/90	Sutherland
1990/91	Bankstown-Canterbury
1991/92	Manly-Warringah
1992/93	Sutherland
1993/94	Fairfield-Liverpool
1994/95	Hawkesbury
1995/96	Campbelltown
1996/97	Penrith
1997/98	Parramatta
1998/99	Bankstown-Canterbury
1999/2000	Bankstown-Canterbury
2000/01	Parramatta
2001/02	Penrith
2002/03	Bankstown
2003/04	Bankstown
2004/05	Campbelltown-Camden
2005/06	Campbelltown-Camden
2006/07	Campbelltown-Camden
2007/08	Parramatta
2008/09	North Sydney
2009/10	Bankstown
2010/11	Bankstown
2011/12	St. George
2012/13	Fairfield-Liverpool
2013/14	Bankstown
2014/15	Bankstown
2015/16	Mosman
2016/17	Sydney
2017/18	Parramatta
2018/19	Northern Districts
2019/20	Eastern Suburbs
2020/21	Northern Districts
2021/22	St. George
2022/23	Parramatta

== Club Championship ==
Won by the club with the highest competition points in aggregate across all 5 grades plus points from the PG and Green Shield competitions. Points are only accrued across round matches and do not include finals.

For each club, each grades' points tally is multiplied by a factor for the purposes of calculating Club Championship points. A point in first grade is worth more than second grade and so on. Due to this system, the winner of the Club Championship usually comes from a club whose first-grade team is within the top 6. However, consistency across the top 3 grades in particular is important.

Club Championship Factors

First grade = 6 points per competition point, Second grade = 5, Third = 4, Fourth = 3, Fifth/PG/Green Shield = 2.

Club Champions 1922/23 - 2020/21
Season	Club Champion
1922/23	Waverley & Marrickville
1923/24	Gordon
1924/25	Petersham
1925/26	Western Suburbs
1926/27	Waverley
1927/28	Waverley
1928/29	Western Suburbs
1929/30	Mosman
1930/31	Randwick
1931/32	Western Suburbs
1932/33	Randwick
1933/34	Randwick
1934/35	Western Suburbs
1935/36	Randwick
1936/37	Western Suburbs
1937/38	Glebe
1938/39	Waverley
1939/40	St. George
1940/41	St. George
1941/42	St. George
1942/43	St. George
1943/44	St. George
1944/45	Randwick
1945/46	Gordon
1946/47	Western Suburbs
1947/48	Gordon
1948/49	Western Suburbs
1949/50	Waverley
1950/51	Balmain
1951/52	Petersham-Marrickville
1952/53	St. George
1953/54	Western Suburbs
1954/55	St. George
1955/56	St. George
1956/57	Mosman
1957/58	Western Suburbs
1958/59	Bankstown-Canterbury
1959/60	Northern Districts
1960/61	St. George
1961/62	St. George
1962/63	St. George
1963/64	St. George
1964/65	St. George
1965/66	St. George
1966/67	Bankstown-Canterbury
1967/68	Sutherland
1968/69	Petersham-Marrickville
1969/70	Central Cumberland
1970/71	St. George
1971/72	Balmain
1972/73	Balmain
1973/74	Central Cumberland
1974/75	Gordon
1975/76	Northern Districts
1976/77	Randwick
1977/78	Manly-Warringah
1978/79	University of NSW
1979/80	Balmain
1980/81	Northern Districts
1981/82	Balmain
1982/83	Penrith
1983/84	St. George
1984/85	St. George
1985/86	St. George
1986/87	Sutherland
1987/88	Bankstown-Canterbury
1988/89	Manly-Warringah
1989/90	Balmain
1990/91	Balmain
1991/92	Randwick
1992/93	Randwick
1993/94	St. George
1994/95	Campbelltown
1995/96	St. George
1996/97	St. George
1997/98	Sutherland
1998/99	Northern Districts
1999/00	Manly-Warringah
2000/01	Sutherland
2001/02	Sydney University
2002/03	Sydney University
2003/04	Bankstown District Cricket Club
2004/05	Parramatta
2005/06	Randwick Petersham
2006/07	Fairfield-Liverpool
2007/08	Randwick Petersham
2008/09	Campbelltown-Camden
2009/10	Campbelltown-Camden
2010/11	Randwick Petersham
2011/12	Manly-Warringah
2012/13	St George
2013/14	Sydney University
2014/15	Manly-Warringah
2015/16	Penrith
2016/17	Northern Districts
2017/18	Manly-Warringah
2018/19	Sydney University
2019/20	Bankstown District Cricket Club
2020/21	Northern Districts
2021/22	

== Records ==
=== Batting ===
==== Most Career Runs ====
Runs	Player	Club(s)	Career	Innings	NO	HS	Avg	100s	50s
15,242	GJ Mail	Parramatta, Hawkesbury, Balmain, Sydney University	1995-2017	383	54	214*	46.32	44	72
13,153	IA Moran	Petersham-Marrickville, Sydney University, Eastern Suburbs	1996-2018	431	53	202	34.79	18	77
12,354	GJ Hayne	UTS Balmain, Gordon	1987-2007	365	30	161	36.87	26	65
12,118	W Bardsley	Glebe, Western Suburbs	1898-1933	291	49	217*	50.07	36	50
11,886	R Chee Quee	Randwick, Randwick-Petersham	1987-2006	346	24	182	36.91	20	72

==== Highest Career Average ====
Avg	Player	Club(s)	Career	Innings	NO	HS	Runs	100s
89.47	DG Bradman	St George, North Sydney	1926-1934	47	11	246	3,221	14
62.09	SG Barnes	Petersham, Waverley, North Sydney, Gordon	1934-1953	126	20	228	6,582	24
62.03	VT Trumper	South Sydney, Paddington, Gordon	1894-1915	163	14	335	9,244	36
60.20	RB Simpson	Petersham-Marrickville, Western Suburbs	1951-1979	209	31	229	10,716	36
59.50	JRM Mackay	Burwood	1902-1909	51	9	204	2,499	13

==== Most Centuries in a Season ====
No.	Player	Innings	Club	Season
7	G Boycott	15	Waverley	1976-77
6	VT Trumper	8	Paddington	1897-98
6	TJE Andrews	17	Petersham	1929-30
6	WE Alley	24	Petersham	1943-44
6	RB Simpson	15	Western Suburbs	1967-68
6	BE McNamara	14	St George	1990-91
6	GM Lambert	23	Fairfield-Liverpool	2006-07
6	D Solway	21	Bankstown	2017-18

==== Most Runs in a Season ====
Runs	Avg	Batsman	Club	Season	Innings	No	HS	100s	50s
1,527	95.44	GM Lambert	Fairfield-Liverpool	2006-07	23	7	206	6	4
1,527	101.80	PJ Wells	Bankstown	2014-15	24	9	190*	5	9
1,455	58.20	AJ Crosthwaite	Manly-Warringah	2014-15	28	3	201*	4	9
1,413	70.65	WE Alley	Petersham	1943-44	24	4	230	6	3
1,398	116.50	RB Simpson	Western Suburbs	1967-68	15	3	178*	6	7

==== Highest Individual Innings ====
Score	Batsman	Club	Opponent	Season	Min	6/4	Balls
335	VT Trumper	Paddington	Redfern	1902-03	180	22/39	-
321	PA Jaques	Sutherland	North Sydney	2006-07	379	12/31	257
314	Harjas Singh	Western Suburbs	Sydney	2025-26	-	35/14	141
308	H Donnan	South Sydney	North Sydney	1896-97	420	-	-
275	SM Pope	Bankstown-Canterbury	Hawkesbury	1993-94	307	5/29	225

==== Highest Average in a Season ====
Avg	Runs	Batsman	Club	Season	Innings	NO	HS	100s	50s
273.00	546	Monty Noble	Paddington	1898-99	6	4	267*	1	4
204.20	1,021	Victor Trumper	Paddington	1897-98	8	3	191*	6	2
170.66	512	Don Bradman	St. George	1932-33	5	2	134	4	1
165.71	1,160	Geoff Boycott	Waverley	1976-77	15	8	140*	7	2
157.80	789	Rodney Davison	Sydney University	2000-01	10	5	168*	3	4

==== Highest Partnerships ====
Wicket	Runs	Batsmen	Club (Score)	Season	Opponent
First	423	VT Trumper (335) & D Gee (172)	Paddington (9-618d)	1902-03	Redfern
Second	390	GJ Mail (200*) & MJ Phelps (200*)	Sydney University (1-447d)	2005-06	Mosman
Third	326*	M O'Neill (200*) & P Emery (127*)	Gordon (2-353d)	1986-87	Fairfield
Fourth	370*	D Bourke (170*) & A May (203*)	St. George (3-391d)	2015-16	Sydney University
Fifth	307	RCM Boyce (192) & LC Donovan (166)	Sydney University (9-420d)	1919-20	Central Cumberland
Sixth	284	CA McComb (153) & RJ Trewartha (119)	St George (7-367)	1991-92	Western Suburbs
Seventh	310	HC Chilvers (154*) & R Taylor (173*)	Northern District (6-402d)	1936-37	Marrickville
Eighth	222*	AR Barnes (104*) & JG Lush (113*)	Mosman (7-441d)	1939-40	Paddington
Ninth	204	D Ball (105*) & A McLean (90)	Northern District (354)	2009-10	Blacktown
Tenth	188*	DG Dawson (200*) & CP Tremain (81*)	UNSW (9-361)	2011-12	Western Suburbs

==== Youngest to Score a First Grade Century ====
Age	Player	Score	For	Against	Born	Scored
16y 133d	Archie Jackson	129	Balmain	St George	05.09.1909	16.01.1926
16y 165d	Ian Craig	106	Mosman	Northern District	12.06.1935	24.11.1951
16y 199d	Ron Kissell	155	Glebe	Paddington	09.08.1928	24.02.1945
16y 257d	Ron Moss	110*	St George	Central Cumberland	13.06.1922	25.02.1939
16y 285 days	Neel Patel	107	UNSW	Parramatta	17.02.2009	29.11.2025

==== Oldest to Score a First Grade Century ====
Age	Player	Score	For	Against	Born	Scored
49y 299d	Warren Bardsley	124	Western Suburbs	University	07.12.1882	01.10.1932
48y 316d	Monty Noble	120	Paddington	Mosman	28.01.1873	10.12.1921
48y 272d	Syd Gregory	101*	Waverley	Central Cumberland	14.04.1870	11.01.1919
47y 352d	Gar Waddy	123	Central Cumberland	Randwick	03.12.1878	20.11.1926
47y 126d	Angus MacKinnon	108	Balmain	Manly	26.10.1916	29.02.1964

==== Most Sixes in an Innings ====
6s	Score	4s	Player	For	Against	Venue	Season
35	314	14	Harjas Singh	Western Suburbs	Sydney	Pratten Park	2025-26
22	335	39	VT Trumper	Paddington	Redfern	Redfern Oval	1902-03
16	152	6	A Cotter	Glebe	Waverley	Waverley Oval	1906-07
16	114*	1	SR Watson	Sutherland	St. George	Allan Border Oval	2017-18
15	189*	22	VT Trumper	Paddington	Waverley	Waverley Oval	1904-05
15	208	15	A Walsh	St. George	UTS North Sydney	Hurstville Oval	2020-21
15	135	5	RE Felsch	Sydney	Hawkesbury	Drummoyne Oval	2020-21

==== Century in Each Innings of a Match ====
1st Inning	2nd Inning	Player	For	Against	Season
105	103	Victor Trumper	Gordon	Balmain	1909-10
103	110*	Tommy Andrews	Petersham	Central Cumberland	1925-26

=== Bowling ===
==== Most Career Wickets ====
Wickets	Bowler	Club(s)	Career	Avg	Best	5W
1,153	HC Chilvers	Northern District	1925-52	15.99	9/46	105
1,029	KC Gulliver	Mosman	1930-63	18.26	8/92	70
962	WJ O’Reilly	North Sydney, St. George	1926-49	9.44	9/27	104
861	OP Asher	Sydney, Paddington	1910-33	17.30	9/46	65
828	AA Mailey	Redfern, Balmain, Middle Harbour, Manly, Waverley	1906-35	18.84	9/53	80

==== Lowest Career Average ====
Avg	Player	Club(s)	Career	Wickets	Best	5W
9.44	WJ O’Reilly	North Sydney, St. George	1926-1949	962	9/27	104
12.65	J Marsh	South Sydney, Sydney	1897-1905	280	8/19	32
13.69	AK Davidson	Northern District, Western Suburbs	1948-1965	348	8/14	28
14.00	H Theak	St. George	1928-1939	222	8/31	20
14.47	CG Macartney	North Sydney, Gordon	1904-1934	581	9/38	54

==== Most Wickets in a Match ====
Figures	1st Inning	2nd Inning	Bowler	Club	Opponent	Season
17-158	8/77	9/81	F Mair	Balmain	Central Cumberland	1933-34
16-68	7/35	9/33	AC Bird	Bankstown	Manly-Warringah	2003-04
16-71	7/31	9/40	RS Taylor	Manly	Glebe	1960-61
16-140	7/38	9/102	R Grover	Waverley	Marrickville	1935-36
16-96	8/43	8/53	TW Garrett	Sydney University	Canterbury	1893-94

==== Most Wickets in a Season ====
Wickets	Player	Club	Season	Avg	Best	5W	10W
147	WJ O’Reilly	St. George	1943-44	8.29	8/49	17	1
126	HC Chilvers	Northern District	1942-43	10.4	9/58	14	2
110	HC Chilvers	Northern District	1941-42	12.27	9/77	15	1
109	WJ O’Reilly	St. George	1942-43	8.69	8/36	12	1
108	WJ O’Reilly	St. George	1941-42	9.01	8/12	10	3

==== Most Wickets in an Innings ====
Figures	Player	Club	Opponent	Season
10-42	MW Sievers	Central Cumberland	Western Suburbs	1943-44
10-55	WA Hunt	Balmain	Paddington	1930-31
10-78	VE Jackson	Waverley	Randwick	1937-38
9-15	OE Nothling	Sydney University	Marrickville	1925-26
9-15	RM Pearce	Balmain	Manly	1940-41

==== Lowest Average in a Season ====
Avg	Wickets	Bowler	Club	Season
5.43	60	AL Newell	Glebe	1893-94
6.77	53	WJ O’Reilly	St George	1937-38
7.74	86	WJ O’Reilly	St George	1939-40
7.80	54	WJ O’Reilly	St George	1931-32
8.05	57	HJT Theak	St George	1932-33

==== Youngest to Take 5 Wickets in an Innings ====
Age	Player	Bowling	Born	Date	For	Against
14y 339d	Horace Stevens	5-45	23.03.1901	26.02.1916	Waverley	North Sydney
15y 250d	Brian Rhodes	5-9	07.03.1951	12.11.1966	Western Suburbs	Central Cumberland
15y 272d	Jacob Lalor	6-40	10.03.1993	07.12.2008	Blacktown	Manly-Warringah
15y 362d	Peter Philpott	5-49	21.11.1934	18.11.1950	Manly	Petersham-Marrickville
16y 106d	Sam Robson	6-70	01.07.1989	15.10.2005	University of NSW	Campbelltown-Camden

==== Oldest to Take 5 Wickets in an Innings ====
Age	Player	Figures	Club	Opponent	Born	Performed
52y 61d	Walter Dight	5-68	Western Suburbs	Central Cumberland	30.10.1870	30.12.1922
50y 307d	Monty Noble	6-37	Paddington	Balmain	28.01.1873	01.12.1923
48y 353d	Billy Ellison	5-52	Randwick	Central Cumberland	12.04.1913	31.03.1962
48y 332d	Ken Hall	5-70	Penrith	Sutherland	05.05.1952	03.03.2001
48y 77d	Greg Matthews	5-28	Sydney University	Penrith	15.12.1959	01.03.2008

==== Double Hat Tricks ====
===== Four Wickets in Four Balls =====
Player	Club	Opponent	Bowling	Season
WP Howell	Central Cumberland	North Sydney	7-58	1900-01
A Cotter	Glebe	Sydney	7-39	1910-11
BG Long	North Sydney	Petersham	5-12	1912-13
H Stevens	Waverley	Balmain	3-2 & 4-17	1921-22
WJ O’Reilly	North Sydney	Western Suburbs	7-22	1933-34
G Gilmour	Western Suburbs	Gordon	8-75	1972-73
D Ball	Northern District	Eastern Suburbs	5-17	2009-10

===== Four Wickets in Five Balls =====
Player	Club	Opponent	Bowling	Season
JD Scott	Petersham	North Sydney	6-7	1916-17
WJ O’Reilly	North Sydney	Paddington	9-27	1933-34
R Frost	Western Suburbs	University	9-26	1952-53
JW Martin	Petersham-Marrickville	Randwick	7-82	1962-63
J Gleeson	Balmain	Western Suburbs	6-55	1966-67
RM Stobo	Gordon	Sutherland	5-21	1988-89

===== Five Wickets in Six Balls =====
Player	Club	Opponent	Bowling	Season
H Stevens	Waverley	Balmain	3-2 & 4-17	1921-22

=== Wicket Keeping ===
==== Most Dismissals in a Season ====
Total	Ct	St	Wicket-Keeper	Club	Season
66	32	34	W Englefield	Northern District	1942-43
65	55	10	SD Stanton	Sydney University	2002-03
64	53	11	DW Parmenter	Randwick-Petersham	2001-02
60	46	14	SA Deitz	Bankstown-Canterbury	1997-98
58	54	4	AJ Campbell	Randwick	1981-82

=== Team Records ===
==== Highest Team Innings ====
Score	Wickets	Team	Opponents	Venue	Season	HS	100s	50s	Overs	Mins
726	5	Paddington	Redfern	SCG	1895-96	155	5	0	159	
636	6	Paddington	Central Cumberland	Parramatta	1918-19	236*	2	3	63	
618	9	Paddington	Redfern	Redfern Oval	1902-03	335	2	0	85	
613	7	South Sydney	North Sydney	SCG	1896-97	308	2	2	169	
585	3	Petersham	University	University Oval	1914-15	232*	2	1	76	228

==== Lowest Completed Team Innings ====
Score	Team	Opponent	Season	HS	Next HS	Ducks	Extra	Overs
14	North Sydney	Petersham	1916-17	5	3*	5	1	5.6
16	Waverley	Leichhardt	1896-97	5	5	4	0	8.2
19	Waverley	North Sydney	1937-38	5	5	5	0	-
20	Burwood	East Sydney	1895-96	8	5	3	3	-
20	Balmain	Western Suburbs	1956-57	5*	3	4	4	-
20	North Sydney	Paddington	1915-16	11	3	6	2	-

=== Other ===
==== Youngest First Grade Player on Debut ====
Age	Player	Team	Born	Debut	Batting	Bowling	Opponent
14y 129d	Graham Southwell	Northern District	29.10.1938	07.03.1953	0 & 28*	DNB	Glebe
14y 318d	Murray Mingay	Manly	23.04.1938	07.03.1953	54	DNB	Western Suburbs
14y 332d	Horace Stevens	Waverley	24.03.1901	19.02.1916	DNB	4/44 + 5/45	North Sydney
14y 340d	Harold Cranney	Central Cumberland	23.10.1886	23.09.1901	42	0/21	Glebe
15y 17d	Jake Doran	Fairfield-Liverpool	02.11.1996	19.11.2011	DNB	DNB	Sydney

==== Brothers Taking All 10 Wickets in an Innings ====
Family Name	Brother 1	Brother 2	Brother 3	For	Against	Season
Ridge	Frank (6-24)	Stanley (4-33)	-	Manly	Canterbury	1894-95
Hume	William (6-47)	Ernest (4-49)	-	Redfern	Sydney	1900-01
Howell	Arthur (4-31)	Norman (4-43)	Bill (2-17)	Central Cumberland	Paddington	1935-36
McGilvray	Norman (8-32)	Alan (2-27)	-	Paddington	Glebe	1936-37
Emery	Vince (5-35)	Vic (5-58)	-	North Sydney	St. George	1955-56
Hourn	Dennis (9-72)	David (1-25)	-	Waverley	Central Cumberland	1974-75
Hourn	Dennis (5-43)	David (5-32)	-	Waverley	Sydney	1981-82
Grimble	John (8-99)	Paul (2-101)	-	Sydney University	Penrith	1992-93

==== Brothers Scoring a Century in the Same Innings ====
Family Name	Brother 1	Score	Brother 2	Score	For	Total	Against	Season
Duff	Walter	136	Reggie	123	North Sydney	8-422d	Redfern	1898-99
Gregory	Charles	150	Syd	123	Waverley	6-364d	Redfern	1901-02
Minnett	Rupert	152*	Les	107*	North Sydney	3-333d	Paddington	1909-10
Bardsley	Warren	200*	Mick	105*	Western Suburbs	2-405d	Central Cumberland	1923-24
Aitken	James	126*	Rob	108	North Sydney	5-447d	Mosman	2007-08
Robson	Angus	134	Sam	113	Eastern Suburbs	6-358d	Northern District	2019-20

== See also ==
- Sydney Shires Cricket
- Grade cricket for like competitions in other states
- Sport in Sydney
