= Campbelltown-Camden District Cricket Club =

Australian cricket club

Team information
- Colours: Grey, Yellow, Green, and Red
- Founded: 1985
- Home ground: Raby Sports Complex
- Official website: Official website

Campbelltown-Camden District Cricket Club (also known as the Ghosts) is a cricket club in New South Wales, Australia.

== History ==
The club was formed in 1985 and won its first title (the first grade limited overs crown) in 1986–87. Since then, it has won other lower grade titles.

Players of note include Ian Davis, Brett Lee, Shane Lee, Michael Bevan, Corey Richards, Winston Davis, Derek Pringle, Mark Stoneman, Monty Panesar and Ollie Pope.

== Cricket ==
The Ghosts home ground is in Raby, New South Wales and they play in the Sydney Grade Cricket competition.
