= Wally Wellham =

Australian cricketer

Personal information
- Full name: Walter Arthur Wellham
- Born: 17 September 1932 (age 92)
- Bowling: Slow-left-arm
- Role: Bowler

Domestic team information
- Years: Team
- ?-1959: Western Suburbs District Cricket Club
- 1959-1960: New South Wales Cricket Team

Walter Arthur Wellham (born 17 September 1932) is a former Australian cricketer who had a brief first class cricket career in the 1959/60 season for the New South Wales cricket team.

A slow left-arm orthodox spin bowler, Wellham played Sydney Grade Cricket for Western Suburbs District Cricket Club before making his first-class debut for New South Wales. He collected 19 wickets from his seven appearances at a bowling average of 23.26 runs per wicket. His nephew, Dirk Wellham, was an Australian Test and One Day International player. Wally Welham was a much-loved and respected high school principal, his schools including Blacktown Boys High School in NSW.

== See also ==
- List of New South Wales representative cricketers
