= Trevor Chappell =

Australian cricketer (born 1952)

Personal information
- Full name: Trevor Martin Chappell
- Born: 12 October 1952 (age 74); Glenelg, South Australia
- Batting: Right-handed
- Bowling: Right-arm medium
- Relatives: Ian Chappell (brother); Greg Chappell (brother); Vic Richardson (grandfather)

International information
- National side: Australia
- Test debut (cap 311): 18 June 1981 v England
- Last Test: 21 July 1981 v England
- ODI debut (cap 61): 23 November 1980 v New Zealand
- Last ODI: 20 June 1983 v India

Domestic team information
- Years: Team
- 1972/73–1975/76: South Australia
- 1976/77: Western Australia
- 1977/78–1985/86: New South Wales

Career statistics
Competition	Test	ODI	FC	LA
Matches	3	20	88	51
Runs scored	79	229	4,049	828
Batting average	15.80	17.61	29.55	24.35
100s/50s	0/0	1/0	5/21	1/3
Top score	27	110	150	110
Balls bowled	0	736	3,355	2,105
Wickets	–	19	59	52
Bowling average	–	28.31	24.77	27.88
5 wickets in innings	–	0	0	0
10 wickets in match	–	0	0	0
Best bowling	–	3/31	4/12	4/35
Catches/stumpings	2/–	8/–	47/–	18/–
- Source: Cricinfo, 18 November 2008

Trevor Martin Chappell (born 12 October 1952) is a former Australian cricketer, a member of the South Australian Chappell family which excelled at cricket. He played 3 tests and 20 One Day Internationals for Australia. He won the Sheffield Shield with New South Wales twice, and scored a century for Australia against India in the 1983 World Cup. His career was overshadowed, however, by an incident in 1981 in which he controversially bowled an underarm delivery to New Zealand cricketer Brian McKechnie to prevent the batsman from hitting a six.

After retiring from first class cricket in 1986, Chappell went on to become fielding coach for the Sri Lanka cricket team in 1996, and in 2001 became coach of the Bangladesh cricket team. He later was the coach of the Singapore cricket team.

== Early life ==
Chappell was the youngest of the Chappell cricketing brothers, his two elder brothers being Ian and Greg, and the grandson of former Australian captain Vic Richardson. Chappell grew up playing cricket in the backyard with his brothers, and like them was coached by Lynn Fuller and attended Prince Alfred College.

Greg Chappell later recalled, "I was going to be every bit the tyrant to Trevor that Ian had been to me. But TC was his own man. Trevor was quiet and unassuming, but if you pushed him too far, he'd explode. That's TC through and through: very passive most of the time, easy going, but push him too far and there's an explosion coming."

Chappell's childhood hero was Keith Miller. Throughout his early playing career he was a batsman, although his excellent fielding at cover also brought him attention. "I figured the cover region was the area where the ball went more often than not, so I thought it was a good spot to field", he later said. "It keeps you occupied and always in the game."

Over the summer of 1969/70 he toured the West Indies with the Australian Schoolboys XI, a team that also included Gary Gilmour, Gary Cosier and Ian Davis. During the tour he came down with chicken pox. He recovered to score 52 against St Kitts.

Chappell also played for South Australia in the Australian Schoolboys Cricket Council Championships in Sydney.

== Early career: 1972–77 ==
=== South Australia ===
Chappell debuted for South Australia in the 1972–73 season, replacing Ken Cunningham who had to drop out for business reasons. He later recalled:

When I first got picked for South Australia, Ian said, "You got to decide what sort of a player you want to be – whether you want to be an aggressive, attacking player, or more like a grafting sort of player." I had to think about that and that I'm not really a free hitter of the ball, so the choice I made was I was going to be more of a grafter.

His career began well, scoring 67 on debut. He made half-centuries in his next two games, but struggled thereafter and was eventually dropped from the South Australian team. Chappell:

When I first played for South Australia, I did all right. Then I got injured right at the start of the second season – I broke my nose and cheekbone in a fielding accident. I damaged my shoulder as well. I couldn't throw very well. Fielding has always been one of my main skills and I lost confidence in the fielding. I wasn't getting any runs, I wasn't bowling much in those days, and I wasn't fielding terribly well either. I ended up playing all of the first-class season and had a bad season. I still couldn't get runs in South Australia the following season but I'd go to England and get runs. I got dropped from the South Australian team.

In 1975 Chappell played for Walsden in the Central Lancashire Cricket League over the English summer. It was a highly successful season for Chappell, who found his medium pace bowling effective on English wickets. He ended up making 1,268 runs at an average of 52.8 and taking 106 wickets at an average of 14 – the first "double" of 1,000 runs and 100 wickets in the Central League since 1961.

Over the 1975–76 Australian summer Chappell toured South Africa as part of DH Robins XI, a special invitational team managed by Richie Benaud. Chappell's teammates included David Steele and Geoff Howarth. Chappell later said "I ... did all right" on the tour. Highlights included scoring 69 against Transvaal.

He returned to England in 1976 and enjoyed another successful English summer in the Lancashire League, this time for East Lancashire.

=== Western Australia ===
Chappell then received an offer to play for the Scarborough Cricket Club in Perth and moved to Western Australia. He had a run of strong games with scores of 48, 88, 43 and 76. This led to him playing four first class games for Western Australia in 1976–77, in which he scored two fifties at an average of 40.

In 1977, he played for East Lancashire again in the Lancashire League.

== World Series Cricket ==
In 1977, Chappell signed to play for World Series Cricket along with his brothers. He had failed to make the first team for WA for the 1977–78 season when Dennis Lillee approached him. Chappell later recalled, "Lillee said to me, "Bad luck about not making it in the WA team. Don't worry, something better might come along." I had no idea what he meant. And a few days later [Austin] Robinson, Dennis' manager, rang and said, "Do you want to join World Series Cricket" and I said, "Yeah, where do I sign?""

Chappell played ten games for WSC Australia in the Country Cup in 1977–78, scoring 339 runs, more than any other Australian batsman, although his average was only 26.

A highlight was a 110 he scored against the West Indies in Albury. He also scored 56 off 300 minutes against a World XI in a Lismore game which resulted in him being booed by the crowd for slow scoring. "Trevor Chappell batted exceptionally well and he did not deserve the rubbishing the crowd gave him", said Australian captain Ross Edwards.

Over the 1978–79 season Chappell mostly played for the WSC Cavaliers, a team of players of various nationalities who were not selected for the top three WSC teams, competing in the Cavaliers Cup.

"We had a whole mixture and nobody probably really wanted to be there", recalled Chappell. "They would rather be in the main games. We had some surprising results. We won a few games we probably weren't expected to."

Chappell enjoyed good form that season, which he partly attributed to the captaincy of Eddie Barlow. "Eddie once said to me early on in the series, 'You gotta stop trying to play like Ian or Greg and play like you. Just be Trevor.' That definitely helped me through World Series."

Chappell's highlights that season included 93 against the West Indies and 126, 96 and 72 against the World XI.

Chappell led the aggregates out of all players in the Country Tour, making 629 runs at an average of 33.1, including one century and four half centuries.

This form helped earn Chappell selection in the Australian XI one-day team for the International Cup that summer (he played in three games with a top score of 14) and also on the Australian XI in the West Indies in 1979.

In the West Indies Chappell was picked in the first four of the Supertests, but was unable to reprise his Australian form in the Caribbean, his highest score in the Test matches and One Day Internationals being 28. During the first Test he was struck in the face by a delivery from Andy Roberts and required stitches.

== Post-WSC ==
=== 1979–80: Move to New South Wales ===
When World Series Cricket ended in 1979, Chappell moved to Sydney and started playing for the club Gordon. He started off the season with 55 for a Rick McCosker XI against a Ross Edwards XI in a trial game. This ensured his selection in the New South Wales team for the first Sheffield Shield match that summer, meaning Chappell had now played for three states. He was preferred to non-WSC-aligned batsman John Dyson, which caused some controversy at the time.

Chappell was under pressure to justify his selection but responded with 150 against West Australia, helping New South Wales win. He later scored 144 against Tasmania 76 not out against Queensland and 80 against the touring English.

Chappell made 674 runs at 42.12. He started to bowl more (five wickets at 14.8), and his fielding by now was amongst the best in the country; he began to be discussed as an international prospect. In April 1980 one Sydney journalist suggested "he must be close to winning the remaining batting place" in the Australian squad to tour England in 1980.

=== 1980–81: One Day International player ===
Chappell began the 1980–81 summer scoring 110 in a grade match for Gordon. His bowling spell of 3–22 helped NSW defeat Queensland.

In November, Chappell was selected in the Australian one-day team against New Zealand alongside Shaun Graf; although Chappell had only scored 121 runs at 31.5 in five innings (39, 2, 50, 19 and 16) his bowling (four wickets for 90) and fielding were seen as benefits by selectors who wanted an all rounder. The Age called it a "shock selection". It was the first time three brothers had been selected for Australia.

Both Graf and Trevor Chappell were picked in the team. Australia lost the game. Chappell managed only 12 runs and took 0–21 with the ball, but he did run out Geoff Howarth. He did not bat or bowl in his second game, also against New Zealand.

Chappell was kept in the team to play India, taking 1–14 and scoring 14. His figures for his next game were 0–27 and 6, then 1–40,

Chappell's position in NSW's Shield team was under threat from Dirk Wellham after making 133 runs at 26 but Chappell then scored 111 for New South Wales against Queensland.

When the game ended Chappell discovered he had been picked in the Australian twelve to play the third test against New Zealand, replacing Shaun Graf (although Graf was kept in the 13 man squad to play India). The Age wrote "in some ways Chappell's incursion is hard to explain. Despite his fielding brilliance, he is not a front line bowler and can hardly lay claim to first call on a vacant position as a Test middle order batsman", suggesting Graham Yallop, Peter Toohey or David Boon would be better. Chappell was made twelfth man for the test match. However Rod Marsh suggested Chappell and/or Graeme Beard could be selected on the 1981 Ashes as a specialist one day player, saying "I can't speak too highly for his fielding. There's no doubt he has lifted our performance in the field." Chappell had to make way for the next test – the first test against India – when Graf returned from injury, although Graf would only play as twelfth man.

He was dropped from the one-day team to make way for Jim Higgs, but soon returned. He took 2–42 against India (including the wicket of Gavaskar), 1–21 and 0 in a narrow loss against New Zealand (dropping John Wright, who scored 78, on 20), 14 against India and 14 against New Zealand.

Chappell scored 100 as a temporary opener for NSW in a three-day game again New Zealand. He managed to keep his place in the Australian ODI squad for the World Series Cricket finals against New Zealand. In the second final Chappell took 2–21. In February 1981, Ian Chappell listed his possible squad for the Ashes. He wrote "if another batsman is needed for any reason, then Trevor Chappell would be my selection because he can bat anywhere in the order and is the best cover field in Australia." This recommendation would be overshadowed by what happened in the third final.

=== Underarm incident ===
Chappell became infamous after bowling an underarm delivery when playing for Australia during a match against New Zealand in 1981. Australia scored 235 batting first; Trevor Chappell bowled the last over in which he dismissed Richard Hadlee and Ian Smith (His figures would be 2-57). New Zealand needed to score six runs off the last ball to tie the match. Not wanting to risk this, Greg Chappell, Australia's captain, asked Trevor how his underarm bowling was. When Trevor Chappell replied that he didn't know because he had never bowled underarm, Greg Chappell said, "well there is only one way to find out" and then Trevor Chappell rolled the ball along the ground to batsman Brian McKechnie.

Underarm bowling, allowed at the time by the rules of the series, but already outlawed at the time in England's domestic competition, is no longer permitted in games under the playing regulations directly controlled by the ICC. In terms of The Laws of Cricket (Law 24.1b), underarm bowling is permitted in other matches provided that the captains agree to it prior to the start of the match.

Although it was not universally illegal to bowl underarm at the time, it was widely accepted to be contrary to the spirit of the game. A visibly agitated McKechnie could do little but block the ball to avoid being dismissed, then throwing his bat away in disgust, and so Australia won the game. It was described as "the most disgusting incident I can recall in the history of cricket" by the then prime minister of New Zealand, Robert Muldoon.

Chappell played in the fourth final, taking 1–41.

He returned to Sheffield Shield making 71 against WA, and 59 and 0 against Tasmania. This form, and his bowling and fielding, helped Chappell be selected on the squad to tour England for the 1981 Ashes. Trevor Chappell's selection – when he had made 2,259 first class runs at 31 and taken 15 wickets at 27 – was generally held to be surprise, as was that of fellow NSW batter Dirk Wellham especially considering Doug Walters had not been selected. (The other main surprise was the selection of Ray Bright over Bruce Yardley and Jim Higgs, who had both played test cricket that summer.) The Age reported Trevor Chappell "must be the first Australian cricketer to have won a major tour berth on the strength of his brilliant fielding."

=== 1981 Ashes ===
Greg Chappell chose not to tour England in 1981, and there was much speculation over who would take his spot at number three in the batting line-up. During the early stages of the tour it was thought Martin Kent would take his place at number three, and Chappell only play one-dayers and tour games. However, Kent displayed poor form while Chappell was more consistent with scores of 47 against Somerset and 91 against Gloucestershire. Brian Mossop of the Sydney Morning Herald said Chappell "came to Australia assured of a place in the one day internationals but needing to show great fortitude to win a test berth. He is mounting an appreciable challenge... His ability to offer a broad bat is a quality that is not much in evidence other than by John Dyson."

Chappell was selected in the Australian team to play the first ODI. Batting at three he scored 16. In the second ODI he was prompted to opener but scored a first ball duck and returned bowling figures of 1-69. In the third ODI he made 14 but took 3–31 to help Australia win the game and the series (the first time Australia had won the pre-Ashes ODI series in England since it was introduced in 1972). Kim Hughes said "Trevor Chappell epitomised what this team's built on – few stars but a good gutsy effort."

As the tour went on, Chappell's form was not particularly good but Kent's was worse (he had a highest score of 28), and it was felt the other batsman, Dirk Wellham, was too inexperienced. All three batters were selected to play Derbyshire – Chappell made 14, Kent 2, Wellham 47. Against Middlesex, Chappell made 18 and 7 but Kent and Wellham did not play. In the end, Chappell was selected in the first Test to bat at number three. Peter McFarline of The Age wrote "although he is a courageous player he is not really the man for the job but he will be there because the only other contender... Kent has failed to come to terms with English conditions." Kim Hughes said "Trevor has batted at number three for New South Wales and faced all of the top Australian bowlers. I think he will do a good job for us. I don't believe it is asking too much of him to bat in such a crucial position in his first test."

"I'd never really expected to play Test cricket – three family members had already played, what were the chances of a fourth?" said Trevor Chappell. "Then I was involved in World Series Cricket, throw in the underarm and the odds were getting longer. So when it did happen, it was a great thrill." Chappell's father Martin, in England at the time, said "It's a proud moment for me... Now that Trevor's got there I hope he makes a good fist for it."

In the final event, Chappell's first innings saw him come in at number five with Graham Yallop at three. He was dropped by Ian Botham when on five, and made 17 runs over 122 minutes. In the second innings, he came to the wicket when Australia was 3-77 chasing 132; he made 20 over 94 minutes, and hit the winning runs as Australia won by four wickets.

Chappell kept his place in the team for the second Test but failed twice, scoring 2 and 5 (in an hour). Despite this poor result, in the next tour game, against Northampton, Chappell scored 71 and Kent failed again (Dirk Wellham scored 135), so the selectors – Kim Hughes, Rod Marsh and Peter Philpott – picked Chappell for the third test. This time Chappell was promoted to number three.

This match passed into legend. In Australia's first innings, Chappell scored 27 over 161 minutes, helping Australia reach 401, notably taking part in a 94-run partnership with John Dyson. England were dismissed for 174, Kim Hughes enforced the follow-on, and at one stage England were 7–135 in response. Then Ian Botham began one of the most famous counter-attacks in Test cricket, scoring 149 not out and helping England reach 356. Chappell was never called upon to bowl. Australia had to score 130 to win. Chappell came to the wicket when Australia were 1–13 – he and Dyson took them to 56, with Chappell making 8 off 56 balls. He was then dismissed, which triggered a collapse; Australia lost the match by 18 runs.

The fighting quality of Chappell's innings had been noted, and it was not a foregone conclusion that he would be dropped. However, by this stage Martin Kent had rediscovered his form with a score of 92 against Worcestershire (Wellham made 52), and he was selected in the Australian eleven for the fourth Test, with Chappell made twelfth man.

Australia lost the fourth test and there was some media talk that Chappell might find his way back in the team for the fifth test in place of Graham Yallop, who had shown weakness against fast bowling. Chappell scored 46 in a tour game, but then it seemed the wicket for the fifth test would take spin, which Yallop excelled at playing, so he kept his spot and Chappell remained twelfth man.

Chappell then won a man-of-the-match award for hitting 63 in a one-day game against Leicestershire. However, Dirk Wellham was preferred to him in the sixth Test.

=== 1981 to 1983 ===
At the beginning of the 1981–82 summer, Chappell was still mentioned as a Test prospect. "Trevor Chappell cannot be left out of calculation", wrote one journalist. "He is resourceful, can bat early or late, bowls a penetrative medium pacer and fields brilliantly." However, Chappell never played Test cricket again. "Being on a tour that is not very successful probably damns your chances to get another go", he later reflected.

Chappell did participate in a 219-run stand against Tasmania for NSW in January 1982. He later took 4–35 against WA in a McDonald's Cup match, and in a crucial Sheffield Shield game against Victoria he took 4–12 and made 47 runs.

Chappell began the following summer poorly when hit by a ball at training. He recovered, and went on to deliver a number of excellent performances for NSW, including 92 against South Australia, 61 against England, 89 against New Zealand in a one-day game and 132 against Queensland. Reviewing the latter innings, which was Chappell's fourth Shield century, Bill O'Reilly wrote that "serious consideration" should be given to Chappell getting back in the Australian team.

The highlight of Chappell's summer came during the Sheffield Shield final, where New South Wales played Western Australia in Perth. Chappell only scored 10 and 33 with the bat, but he took 3–32 in Western Australia's first innings and 4–45 in their second. This effort was crucial in helping bowl New South Wales to victory. It was the state's first Shield in seventeen years.

Chappell then took 2–32 in a McDonald's Cup game semi-final against Queensland. He ended the season with 633 first class runs and 27 wickets plus eleven catches.

=== 1983 World Cup ===
Chappell's efforts over the summer resulted in a surprise selection for the 14-man Australian's 1983 World Cup squad in May 1983. His ODI record was 16 games, 90 runs at 10 and 15 wickets at 29.6 but Chappell's experience in England was thought to have given him the edge over his main rival, Ken MacLeay. He said at the time:

I thought I was in with a chance but I didn't want to build up my hopes. The way I worked it out, it was to be me or Ken MacLeay and I knew I had a few years experience on him, having played Tests and more Sheffield Shield. This is the biggest thrill apart from my 1981 Test selection in England and helping bring back the Sheffield Shield to NSW last year.

Trevor Chappell was going to the World Cup as part of a travel business he had with Doug Walters, but had to cancel. Ken Macleay ended up joining the squad anyway, when Greg Chappell fell injured and elected not to tour. Captain Kim Hughes said "with the utmost respect to Trevor and Ken we haven't got a world class all rounder."

Chappell was made 12th man for Australia's early games. He was selected for a game against India and promoted to opener – he responded by scoring 110 of 131 balls. However, he found less success in later matches – although he took 3–47 against Zimbabwe. Reviewing the tour Peter Mcfarline wrote Chappell "helped the side enormously with a century against India but lack of class both as a batsman and a bowler is exposed at this level."

He never played for Australia again after the tournament. Chappell later recalled:

I preferred to open the batting or bat in the top order somewhere. But I probably wasn't good enough to bat at No. 3 or No. 4, which is why I was where I was – down at the bottom. It just depended if we had couple of good openers so I wasn't going to get a go there and at No. 3 or No. 4 or even at 5, 6, so 7 is where I got a go in the international team.

== Later career ==
A series of indifferent performances led to Chappell being dropped by New South Wales during the 1983–84 season. He was kept on in the one day team and scored 54 against the Australian Capital Territory.

During the opening game of the 1984–85 season Chappell was again dropped from the NSW Shield team down to 12th man. However he was kept in the team for the McDonald's Cup. Injuries to players and national selection duties meant Chappell found himself back in the team. New South Wales ended up winning both the Sheffield Shield and the McDonald's Cup that season.

During the 1985–86 summer, Chappell was suspended for two premiership matches in Sydney's grade competition for disputing an umpire's decision.

== Later life ==
Chappell retired from first-class cricket in 1986; however, he continued to play grade cricket with the North Sydney cricket club, leading them to a premiership. He went on to coach the Gordon Women's cricket club.

In 1987, he and Brian McKechnie reunited to play a double wicket game together in New Zealand.

He was a fielding coach for Sri Lanka from 1996 to 2000 and had a short stint as national coach for Bangladesh. "I’m lucky coaching came along because I couldn’t bear the thought of office work", he said later. He says coaching Bangladesh was a very rough job because of the language barrier. He was sacked as coach of Bangladesh in April 2002 after the team lost ten out of its first eleven Tests.

In 2003, Chappell, along with his brothers, were honoured by the South Australian Cricket Association when a new stand in the Adelaide Oval was named the Chappell Stand after the cricketing brothers.

Chappell then became coach of the 1st XI cricket team at The King's School, Parramatta over the Australian summer. He also began coaching the Singapore National Cricket Team. In 2006, he also participated in a game to celebrate former teammate Robert Holland's 60th birthday, as well as Greg Matthews, David Gilbert, Rick McCosker and Greg Dyer at Toronto, NSW.

From July to September 2009, he undertook a 50-day stint as coach of Singapore for its ICC World Cricket League Division 6 tournament, held in Singapore.

In 2013, he said about coaching in Singapore that "I have never had my best 11 together during a training session. It is very disjointed and players offer excuses not to train, some of which are probably not legitimate. The players are amateur, so there isn’t always the motivation to come to training. The work schedule is long and players can’t leave work early for cricket here. So, as coach it means having to do things over and over again because we can’t get guys together." "I wouldn’t mind being more involved with helping the New South Wales juniors", he said. "Unfortunately, the cricket associations seem to look at players from the 1970s and ‘80s as from a bygone era. I have tried a few times to get a more prominent gig in Australia but it never progressed anywhere."

== Personal life ==
Chappell married Lorraine Gavin in Canberra in 1981; Graeme Watson was his best man.

"There is not a lot non-cricketing that I have done really", he said in a later interview. "I'm not married and don't have any kids, so that is a very short story. I was married, shortly after the underarm actually, in March 1981 and then divorced before the 1980s had finished."
