= Sydney University Cricket Club =

Cricket club of sydney university

Team information
- Colors: Yellow & blue
- Founded: 1864
- Home ground: University Oval No.1
- Official website: https://sydneyuniversitycricket.com

Sydney University Cricket Club is a cricket club associated with the University of Sydney that plays predominantly in the NSW Premier Cricket competition. It was founded in 1864.

== History ==
Teams representing the University of Sydney first played in the 1853-54 season. The club was founded in 1864 and joined the Sydney Grade Cricket competition in its inaugural season in 1893. Its first Grade Cricket match was against Glebe Cricket Club at Wentworth Park in 1893.

== Records ==
The record for most runs in a 1st grade season for SUCC is held by Greg Mail, with 1,266 runs in the 2009-10 season. The record for most wickets in a 1st grade season for SUCC is held by Jack Massie, with 69 wickets in the 1913-14 season.

== Notable players ==
Australian Test players who have played for Sydney University Cricket Club include Tom Garrett, Sammy Jones, Johnny Taylor, John Dyson, Beau Casson, Greg Matthews, Stuart Clark, Stuart MacGill and Ed Cowan. Test players Imran Khan of Pakistan, William Somerville of New Zealand and Kevin Pietersen of England have also played for the club.

Australia's first prime minister Edmund Barton played cricket for Sydney University Cricket Club.
