= Blacktown Grade Cricket Club =

Blacktown District Cricket Club
Team information
- Colours: Black Gold White
- Founded: 1894
- Home ground: Joe McAleer Oval
- Capacity: 10

Blacktown District Cricket Club is a cricket club in Blacktown, New South Wales, Australia. They are also known as the Blacktown Warriors and play in the Sydney Grade Cricket competition. They were founded in 1894.
