= Hugh Chilvers =

Australian cricketer (1902–1994)

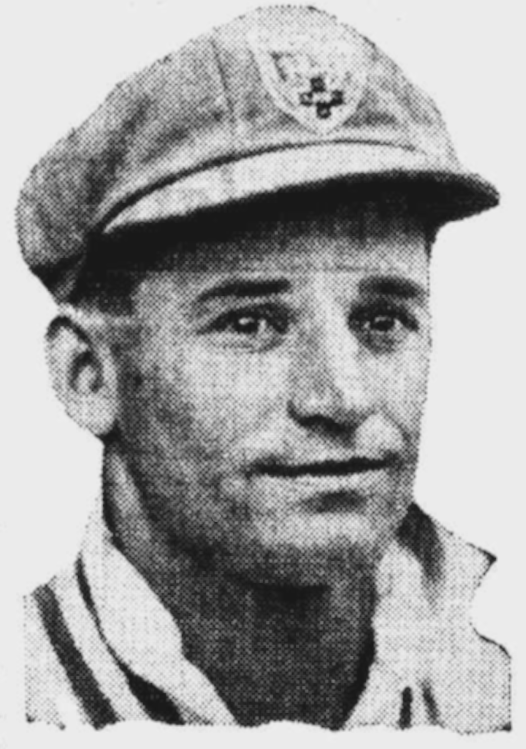
- Chilvers in 1934

Personal information
- Full name: Hugh Cecil Chilvers
- Born: 26 October 1902; Sawbridgeworth, Hertfordshire, England
- Died: 1 December 1994 (aged 92); Sydney, New South Wales, Australia
- Height: 5 ft 7 in (1.70 m)
- Batting: Right-handed
- Bowling: Leg-spin googly

Domestic team information
- Years: Team
- 1929–30 to 1936–37: New South Wales

Career statistics
Competition	First-class
Matches	34
Runs scored	550
Batting average	16.17
100s/50s	0/1
Top score	52
Balls bowled	9,485
Wickets	151
Bowling average	26.39
5 wickets in innings	11
10 wickets in match	3
Best bowling	6/62
Catches/stumpings	17/–
- Source: Cricinfo, 16 December 2025

Hugh Cecil Chilvers (26 October 1902 – 1 December 1994) was an Australian cricketer. A leg-spin bowler, he played 34 first-class matches for New South Wales between 1929–30 and 1936–37.

"A whippy, accurate leg-spinner with an effective wrong 'un", Chilvers was one of Australia's leading spin bowlers during his career, but his chances of promotion to the national Test team were blocked by Australia's wealth of wrist spinners at the time. He was chosen to tour New Zealand with an Australian second team in 1933–34, but the tour was cancelled.

In the six matches of the 1934–35 Sheffield Shield, Chilvers took 46 wickets at an average of 18.63, including five or more wickets in an innings six times. His best first-class figures were 6 for 62 against Queensland in the 1933–34 Sheffield Shield. Playing for Northern District in the Sydney competition from 1925 to 1952, he took 1,153 wickets, a record for the competition. He set the record for most wickets in a season with 110 in 1941–42, then broke it the next season with 126.

Chilvers worked as a manager for the NSW Malting Company in the northern Sydney suburb of Thornleigh.
