= Mosman Cricket Club =

Personnel
- Captain: (Australia) Nathan Hinton
- Coach: Peter Forrest

Team information
- Colors: Blue, yellow and red
- Founded: 1908
- Home ground: Allan Border Oval, Mosman
- Official website: https://mosmancricket.com

Mosman Cricket Club is a cricket club based in Mosman, New South Wales, Australia. The club's senior players compete in the Sydney Grade Cricket competition, while junior members play in the North Shore Junior Cricket Association. Mosman Cricket Club was founded in 1908 (although Middle Harbour CC may have been founded in 1894) and entered the Sydney first grade competition in 1921, having played in lower grades in previous seasons. The club was known as Mosman-Middle Harbour CC for many years after Mosman and Middle Harbour cricket clubs merged.

Mosman Cricket Club has produced a number of international cricketers, most recently Brett Lee and Shane Lee, as well as Australian cricket captains Allan Border and Ian Craig. Current New South Wales state representatives include Daniel Hughes and Greg West.
