= Nicholas Bills =

Australian cricketer (born 1992)

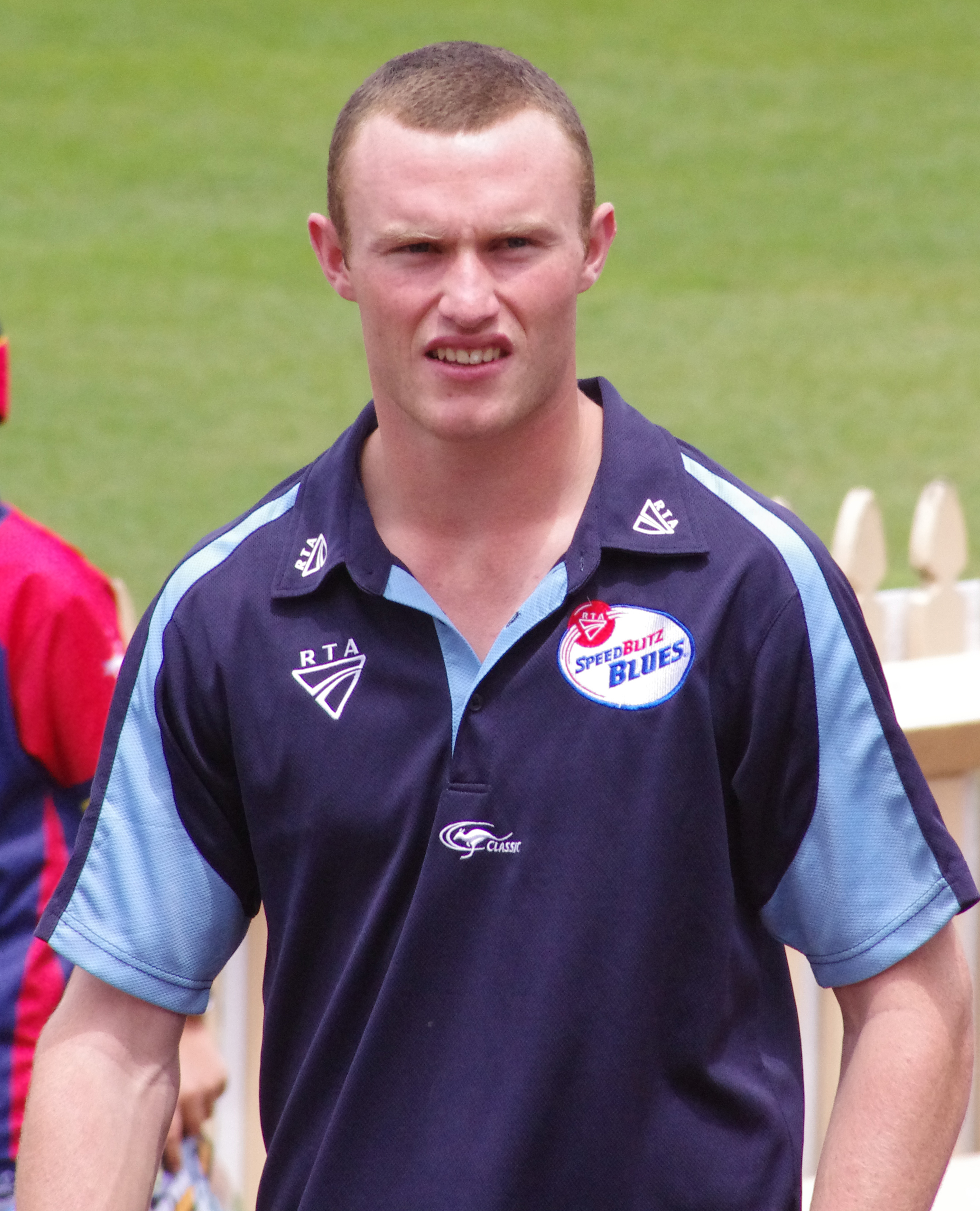

Personal information
- Full name: Nicholas David Bills
- Born: 16 February 1992 (age 34); Wahroonga, New South Wales, Australia
- Batting: Right-handed
- Bowling: Right armed fast-medium

Domestic team information
- Years: Team
- 2011–present: New South Wales

Career statistics
| Competition | FC | T20 |
|---|---|---|
| Matches | 2 | 1 |
| Runs scored | 13 | – |
| Batting average | 13.00 | – |
| 100s/50s | 0/0 | –/– |
| Top score | 7* | – |
| Balls bowled | 336 | 24 |
| Wickets | 5 | 2 |
| Bowling average | 39.60 | 22.00 |
| 5 wickets in innings | 0 | 0 |
| 10 wickets in match | 0 | n/a |
| Best bowling | 3/76 | 2/44 |
| Catches/stumpings | 0/– | 0/– |
- Source: Cricinfo, 16 December 2014

Nicholas David Bills (born 16 February 1992) is a New South Wales cricket player. Bills made his first-class cricket debut on 10–13 March 2011 against Western Australia at the Sydney Cricket Ground. In his debut match, the right-arm medium pacer took 2 wickets for 95 runs. Major teams he has played for include New South Wales, New South Wales under 23s and North Sydney District Cricket Club.

== See also ==
- List of New South Wales representative cricketers
