= Sydney Cricket Club =

Personnel
- Captain: (Australia)
- Coach: (Australia)

Team information
- Home ground: Drummoyne Oval
- Capacity: 5,000

Sydney Cricket Club play in the Sydney Grade Cricket Competition. In 2007 the UTS-Balmain club formed a partnership with the Sydney Cricket Ground Trust and are now known as Sydney CC or Sydney Cricket Club or just simply Sydney Tigers. The Tigers play out of Drummoyne Oval. With over 100 years of history and tradition, Balmain have long been a mainstay of the competition. In season 2007/08 there were 14 different sides representing the black and gold, eight of these men's and six women's. After the merger with the Sydney Cricket Ground Trust, the club is often seen as the competition's glamour club.

== History of Balmain ==
At the turn of the 20th century, a club by the name of Sydney Cricket Club was in existence and playing regular fixtures. Based at Moore Park, players included Jack Marsh.

From 1897 to 1900, a team known as the Balmain Electorate Cricket Club was included in the Sydney grade cricket competition. They joined teams known as East Sydney, Paddington, Waverley, Glebe, South Sydney, Burwood, North Sydney, Redfern, Central Cumberland and Leichhardt.

Between 1900 and 1904, the team was renamed the Leichhardt-Balmain District Cricket Club and from 1904 it became known as the Balmain District Club. In 2001–2002, the Club entered into a partnership with the University of Technology, Sydney and was then known as UTS Balmain Cricket Club. In over 100 years of competition, the club has won 7 Club Championships, 4 first grade premierships and a number of lower grade premierships but the history of cricket is liberally sprinkled with players from Balmain who represented their State and Country with distinction.

Throughout the period from 1897 to 1946–47, Birchgrove Oval was the headquarters of the club and it was 1947–48 when the club moved to Drummoyne Oval. The most famous game ever played by Balmain was undoubtedly the one at Birchgrove on 18 and 25 March 1933 when around 10,000 people attended each day to watch St George with Don Bradman and Balmain with Arthur Mailey. For the record, the match ended in a draw – Balmain 394 – St George 7/358 (Bradman 134).

Famous Balmain players include Archie Jackson, Graham Thorpe, Nathan Bracken, Joe Denly, Zak Crawley and Ireland 2007 World Cup hero Jeremy Bray. The highest first grade run scorer of all time is former opening batsman Greg Hayne, who retired at the end of the 2006/07 season, who also heads the list of those who have scored the most centuries for the club.

Following the decision to merge with the SCG Trust the club has experienced a significant financial windfall, allowing them to assemble one of the better squads in the competition, including the purchase of recently de-listed players Dominic Thornley and Daniel Smith and English representatives Joe Denly and Sam Northeast. Due to this, they were successful in the First Grade Twenty20 competition in 2010/11, but were unable to make a significant challenge for the First Grade premiership.
