= Hurstville Oval =

Sports ground in Sydney, Australia

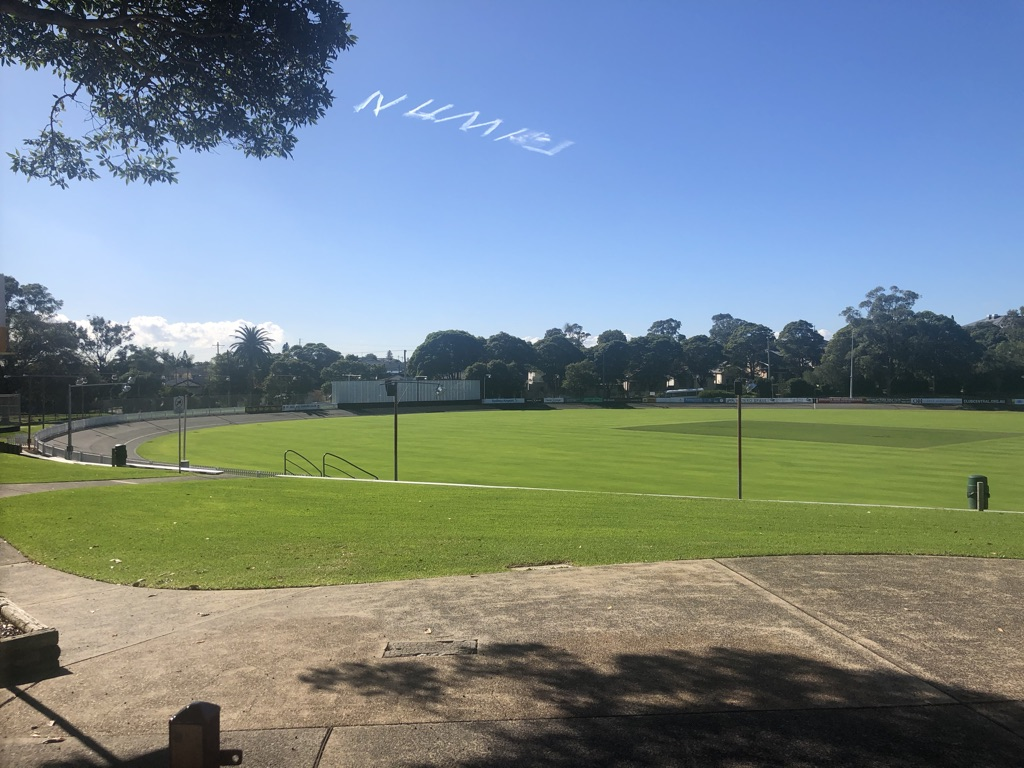
- Hurstville Oval view from entrance
- Interactive map of Hurstville Oval

Ground information
- Location: Hurstville, New South Wales
- Coordinates: 33.9611°S 151.0992°E
- Capacity: 5,000 (seated)
- Tenants: St George Dragons (NSWRL) (1921–1924, 1940–1949); St George Cricket Club (Sydney Grade Cricket) (1921–present); Sydney Sixers (WBBL) (2015-present); New South Wales Blues (domestic matches) (2013-present); Cricket Australia XI (JLT Cup) (2015-present)
- End names
- Dora St End; Patrick St End

International information
- First women's ODI: 31 October 2008: Australia v India
- Last women's ODI: 13 November 2014: Australia v West Indies
- Only women's T20I: 28 October 2008: Australia v India
- As of 7 September 2020; Source: Cricinfo

Hurstville Oval is a multi-use sporting ground, located in the suburb of Hurstville, in Sydney's southern suburbs. Since its opening, it has held various sports at the venue – including Cricket, Rugby League, Cycling and Football. The oval also has a velodrome in the grounds, between the field and the stands.

The ground was opened in 1911.

== Sports used ==
=== Cycling ===
The St George Cycling Club, originally known as Hurstville Bicycle Club, started competition at the oval in 1906 on grass. They later built a cinders track prior to the amalgamation of several small clubs into St. George Cycling Club in 1920. The club benefited from the membership of Dunc Gray, the Olympic champion, who also established his home and business just a kilometre away from the track.

St. George Cycling Club staged national titles at Hurstville in the 1950s and under the guidance of Charlie Manins as an administrator and legendary coach Joe Buckley, developed into a powerful and ultra-competitive club.

Since 1956, no Olympic or Commonwealth Games Cycling Team has competed without a representative from St. George Cycling Club. Notable members include Dunc Gray, Warren Scarfe, Frank Brazier, Ian Chapman, Max Langshaw, Dick Paris, Gary Sutton, Kevin Nichols, Martin Vinnicombe, Shane Sutton, Brett Dutton, Graeme Brown, Steve Wooldridge, Julie Speight, Kathleen Shannon, Clayton Stevenson, Ben Kersten, Ian Christison, Ben Brooks, Ashlee Ankudinoff, Steve Griffiths, and Kaarle McCulloch, all of whom have stood on the podium at the Olympics, World Titles, or Commonwealth Games.

=== Rugby Union ===
The St. George Rugby Union Football Club used the Oval from 1928 until 1939, and then again from 1950 until 1988. The club produced 18 Wallabies in that period, starting with Dan Carroll being the first in 1908, two years after the club was formed. Prior to 1928, the club played at Brighton Le Sands, Arncliffe and also used Kogarah Oval.

=== Rugby League ===
During the NSWRL competition, the St George Dragons club used the ground as their home-ground matches, from 1921 until 1924, before moving to Earl Park in 1925. The club later returned to the ground in 1940, and remained there until 1949. The Dragons moved to Kogarah Oval in 1950, where they remained for many years.

The Dragons' Jack Lindwall has two club records for the club – scoring most points in a match and most tries in a match – both records were held at Hurstville Oval (on 3 May 1947, against Manly-Warringah Sea Eagles).

=== Australian football ===
Australian football was played by the St George Australian "rules" football club in the 1950s and 1960s at Hurstville Oval prior to the move to Olds Park in Penhurst.

=== Cricket ===
The St George Cricket Club, who currently play in the Sydney Grade Competition, use the Ground as their home ground, ever since 1921, when the club joined the competition. Famous Australian Cricketer, Don Bradman, played for the club from 1926 until 1933. He played numerous games at the ground.

Hurstville Oval was one of the host venues of the 2013–14 Ryobi One-Day Cup, the major interstate one-day cricket competition in Australia. The first game at the ground saw New South Wales defeat Western Australia by 5 wickets on 13 October. The second and last game at Hurstville saw Tasmania defeat Queensland by 2 wickets on 15 October. Since 2015 it has been used as one of the home grounds of Cricket Australia XI in the JLT Cup. It is also used to host various other games in the competition taking place in New South Wales.
