= Parramatta District Cricket Club =

Personnel
- Captain: (Australia) TBA
- Coach: (Australia) TBA

Team information
- Founded: 1843
- Home ground: Old Kings Oval
- Capacity: 5,000

Parramatta District Cricket Club is a cricket club based in Parramatta, New South Wales, Australia. They are also known as the Parra and play in the Sydney Grade Cricket competition. Formerly Central Cumberland, the club was founded in 1843 and a foundation member of the grade competition. It claims to be the oldest living club in NSW & second oldest in Australia. Home of Richie Benaud, John Benaud, Doug Walters, Ben Duckett and the winner of six First Grade Premierships. Bob Simpson is a coaching advisor.
