= Sutherland District Cricket Club =

- Nickname: Sharks
- League: Sydney Grade Cricket

Personnel
- Captain: Chris Williams

Team information
- City: Sutherland, New South Wales, Australia
- Colours: Blue
- Founded: 1965
- Home ground: Glenn McGrath Oval
- Capacity: 5,000
- Official website: Sutherland District Cricket Club

Sutherland District Cricket Club (SDCC) is a cricket club based in the Sutherland Shire, New South Wales, Australia. They are also known as the Sharks and play in the Sydney Grade Cricket competition. They were founded in 1965.

Australian Test players who have played for Sutherland District Cricket Club include Norm O'Neill, Andrew Hilditch, Steve Rixon, John Dyson, Len Pascoe, Glenn McGrath, Stuart MacGill, Phil Jacques, Stuart Clark, Shane Watson, Steve Smith and Nic Maddinson. State players Ben Dwarshuis and Daniel Fallins also represent the side, as well as Austin Waugh, son of former test captain Steve Waugh.
