= Randwick Petersham Cricket Club =

Cricket team

- Nickname: Randy Petes
- League: Sydney Grade Cricket

Personnel
- Captain: Jason Sangha
- Coach: Michael Haire

Team information
- City: Randwick, New South Wales, Australia
- Colours: Green Gold
- Founded: 2001
- Home ground: Coogee Oval
- Capacity: 5,000
- Official website: Randwick Petersham Cricket Club

Randwick Petersham Cricket Club, also known as the Randy Petes, competes in the Sydney Grade Cricket competition in Grades 1 to 5, Poidevin Gray (under-21) and AW Green Shield (under-16). It also fields two teams in the Sydney Metropolitan competition.

Established in 2001 following a merger between Randwick Cricket Club and Petersham-Marrickville District CC, the Randy Petes have been highly successful winning two Club Championships (2007/08 and 2010/11) and premierships across Grades 1 to 6. The club have produced many state cricketers, including New South Wales and Cricket Australia XI player Jason Sangha, and Australian Test players Simon Katich, Nathan Hauritz, Usman Khawaja and David Warner, as well as Australian Twenty20 International players Daniel Sams and Nathan Ellis.

In February 2018, Carly Leeson became the first female cricketer to play in a men's grade cricket for Randwick Petersham.
