= Fairfield-Liverpool Grade Cricket Club =

Personnel
- Captain: (Australia) TBA
- Coach: (Australia) TBA

Team information
- Founded: 1905
- Home ground: Rosedale Oval
- Capacity: 5,000
- Official website: https://fairfieldliverpoolcc.com

Fairfield-Liverpool Grade Cricket Club is a cricket club based in Fairfield, New South Wales and Liverpool, New South Wales Australia. Their nickname is the Lions. Their most notable former players are former Australian bowler Doug Bollinger and former NSW players Grant Lambert and Ben Rohrer. Pat Richards, a rugby league footballer for Parramatta Eels, Wests Tigers and Wigan Warriors is also a former player.
