= Murray Creed =

South African cricketer

Personal information
- Full name: Murray Wayne Creed
- Born: 5 March 1979 (age 47); Port Elizabeth, Cape Province, South Africa
- Nickname: Panther
- Height: 5 ft 9 in (1.75 m)
- Batting: Right-handed
- Bowling: Right-arm fast-medium

Domestic team information
- Years: Team
- 2001–2002: Nottinghamshire Cricket Board
- 1998/99-2000/01: Eastern Province
- 1997/98-1998/99: Eastern Province B

Career statistics
Competition	FC	LA
Matches	22	33
Runs scored	728	512
Batting average	25.10	20.48
100s/50s	–/3	–/1
Top score	72	77
Balls bowled	1,633	–
Wickets	18	–
Bowling average	49.38	–
5 wickets in innings	–	–
10 wickets in match	–	–
Best bowling	4/30	–
Catches/stumpings	9/–	7/–
- Source: Cricinfo, 23 November 2010

Murray Wayne Creed (born 5 March 1979) is a South African cricketer. Creed is a right-handed batsman who bowls right-arm fast-medium. He was born in Port Elizabeth, Cape Province.

== Biography ==
Creed made his first-class debut for Eastern Province B against North West in the 1997/98 season. Creed also played first-class cricket for the main Eastern Province team, playing 14 first-class matches for them from the 1998/99-2000/01 seasons, to add to the 4 he played for the B team in the 1997/98/1998/99 seasons. Additionally, he played a single first-class match for a Border and Eastern Province Combined XI and 3 matches for the South Africa Academy. In total he played 22 first-class matches, with his final one coming for Eastern Province against Free State in March 2001. In his 22 career first-class matches, he scored 728 runs at a batting average of 25.10, with 3 half centuries and a high score of 72, while in the field he took 9 catches. With the ball he took 18 wickets at a bowling average of 49.38, with best figures of 4/30.

It was for Eastern Province that he made his debut in List A cricket during the 1998/99 Standard Bank League against Border. From the 1998/99 season to the 2000/01 season, he represented the Province in 30 List A matches, the last of which came against KwaZulu-Natal in February 2001. In his 30 matches for the Province, he scored 383 runs at an average of 17.40, with a high score of 47, while in the field he took 6 catches. With the ball he took 9 wickets at an average of 39.33, with best figures of 2/22.

He later represented the Nottinghamshire Cricket Board in 3 List A matches. These against Bedfordshire in the 1st round of the 2001 Cheltenham & Gloucester Trophy, Oxfordshire in the 1st round of the 2002 Cheltenham & Gloucester Trophy which was played in 2002 and Cumberland in the 1st round of the 2003 Cheltenham & Gloucester Trophy which was played in 2002. In his 3 matches for the Board, he scored 129 runs at an average of 43.00, with a single half century high score of 77.
