= Chatswood Oval =

Sports venue in Chatswood, New South Wales, Australia

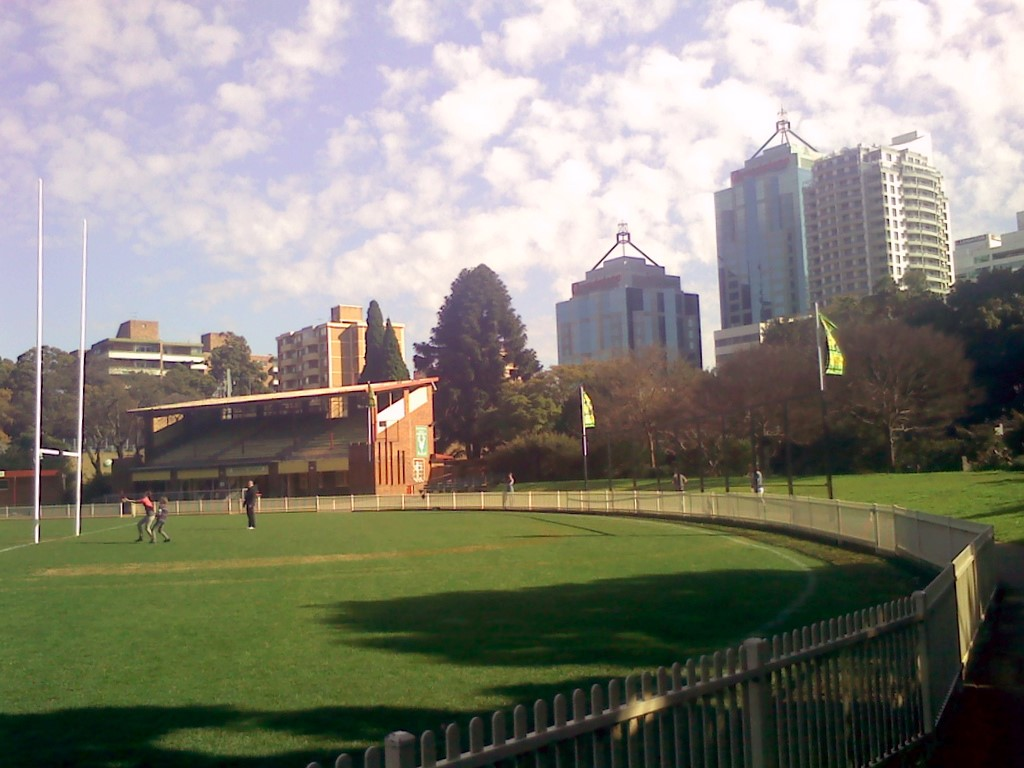
- Interactive map of Chatswood Oval
- Location: Chatswood, New South Wales, Australia
- Country: Australia
- Coordinates: 33°47.9733′S 151°10.88904′E
- Establishment: 1900
- Capacity: 8,200 (approximately)
- Owner: City of Willoughby
- Tenants: Gordon Rugby Football Club, & Gordon District Cricket Club

Chatswood Oval is located south of the Chatswood railway station in Chatswood, a suburb on Sydney's Lower North Shore. It has four small pavilions and seating surrounding the oval. It is one of the Lower North Shore's largest sportsgrounds, and the home ground of the Gordon Rugby Football Club and Gordon District Cricket Club. One of the largest crowds was 8,127 when Gordon Rugby played Randwick in 1976. Gordon Rugby have been playing at Chatswood Oval since 1936. The approximate dimensions of the oval are 145 metres by 112 metres.

== History ==
In 1898, the local council approved for five acres of land south of the railway station to be made a public park. This area was formerly a Chinese market garden with a large well in the centre. The oval was opened in 1900. In the season 1906–07 The Gordon District Cricket Club took up residence, previously known as the Willoughby District Cricket Club.

The heyday of cricket for Chatswood Oval was up to the 1930s. Of note was Don Bradman's 201 runs scored at Chatswood Oval in April 1932, including 28 fours and two sixes in 171 minutes. Also, the local resident Charlie Macartney who hit a cricket ball over the train line, disrupting a game of bowls. Macartney was affectionately known by Chatswood residents as "our Governor General". His friend, another local resident Victor Trumper played here, and was a crowd favourite. The Trumper Pavilion was named in his honour. Bert Oldfield played regularly at Chatswood Oval. Macartney, Trumper and Oldfield were all Wisden Cricketers of the Year.

A few first grade Rugby league games were played at Chatswood Oval in the 1930s. Featuring North Sydney playing Souths, Easts and Balmain.

In the early 1900s trees were planted around the oval. Many survive to the 21st century, including fine examples of hoop pine and bunya pine.

Chatswood Oval has also hosted first grade rugby league matches in the past. Between 1933 and 1936, The North Sydney Bears moved home games to the ground. On 2 April 2017, Chatswood Oval hosted its first rugby league match in 81 years as North Sydney Bears moved their home game to the venue to play The Wests Tigers in The NSW Cup.

== Pavilions ==
It soon became clear that the original 1903 grandstand was too small. And in 1913 plans were made to replace it. This occurred in 1924 with the construction of the Trumper Pavilion, which seats 250 spectators. The Cedric Pike stand (1963), holding 315 spectators was named after a local Rugby figure, who died as a prisoner of war in Malaya in 1943. The Paul Harrison Pavilion (1980) is named after a local supporter of sport. And the Jack Donnelly Stand (1980) is named after a former mayor and athlete.

== Famous cricketers associated with Chatswood Oval ==
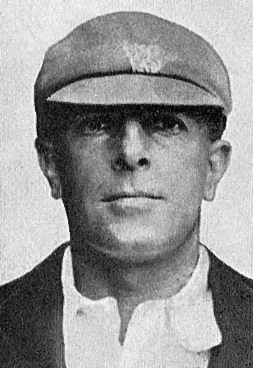
"Our Governor General", Chatswood resident Charlie Macartney

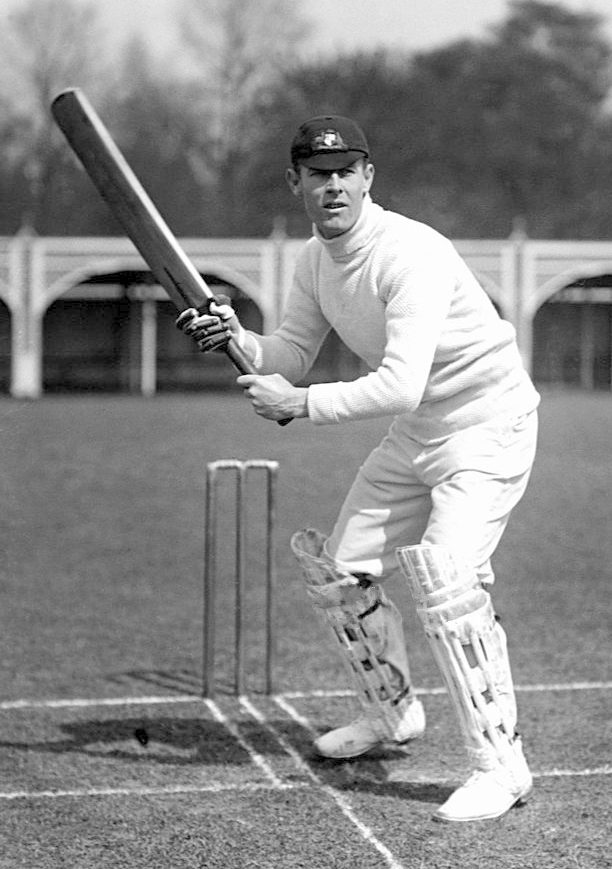
Chatswood resident and cricket immortal, Victor Trumper

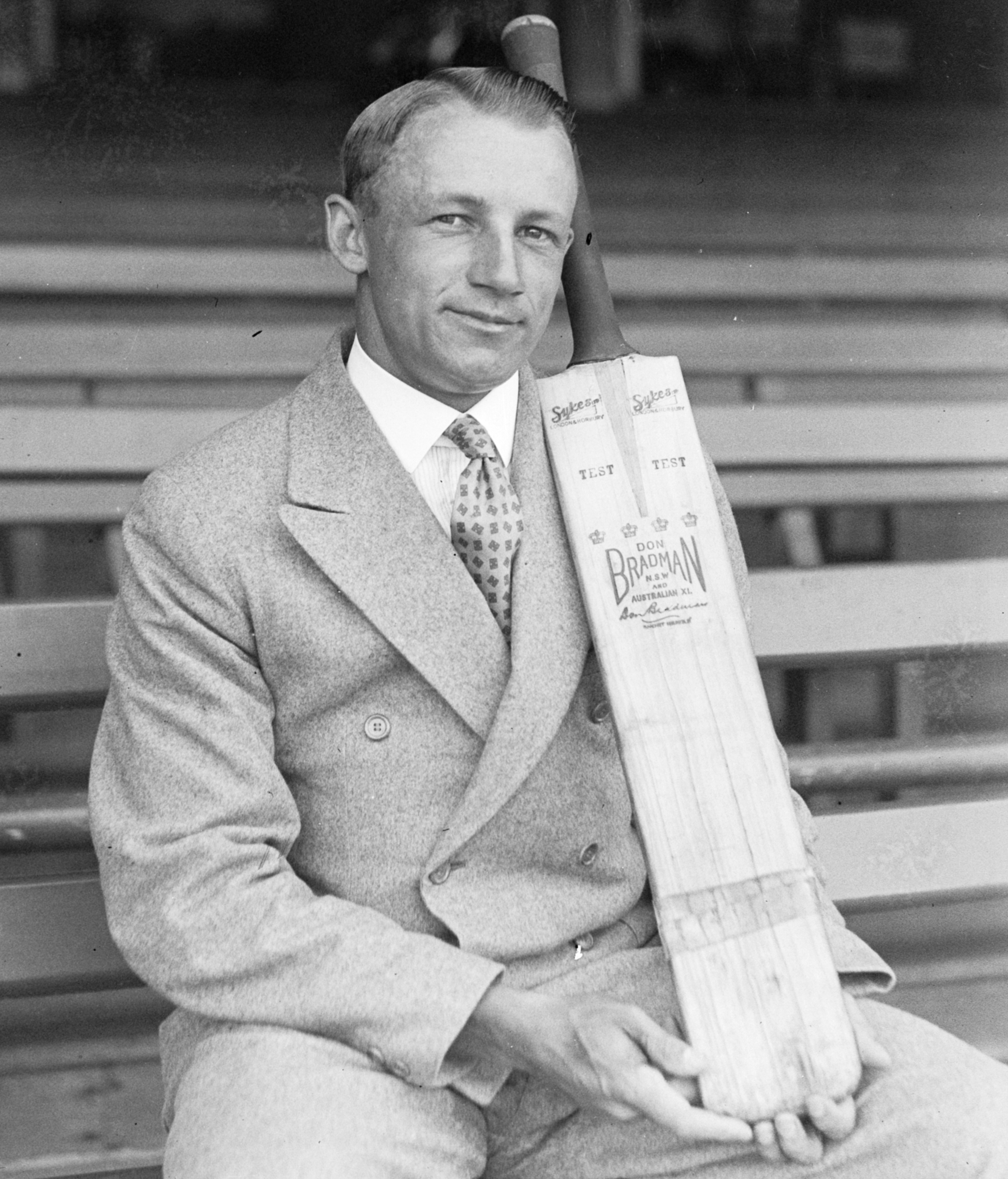
Don Bradman, who scored 201 at Chatswood Oval

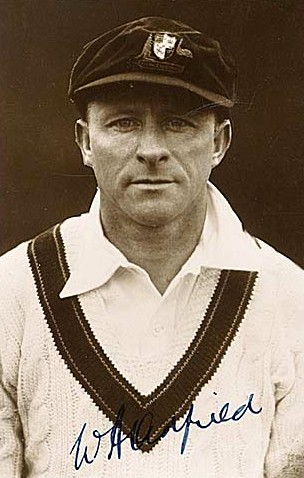
Bert Oldfield, wicketkeeper for Gordon District Cricket Club
