= Gordon District Cricket Club =

- Nickname: Stags
- League: Sydney Grade Cricket

Personnel
- Captain: Tym Crawford
- Coach: Elliot Richtor

Team information
- Colours: Maroon
- Founded: 1905
- Home ground: Chatswood Oval
- Capacity: 5,000
- Official website: Gordon Cricket

Gordon District Cricket Club is based in Gordon, New South Wales, Australia. Founded in 1905, the club has won 6 first grade titles. The Stags share their home ground, Chatswood Oval, with Gordon Rugby Club. Nineteen players have gone on to play international cricket, including Victor Trumper, Charlie Macartney, Bert Oldfield, Brian Taber, Ian Davis, Phil Emery, Adam Gilchrist, Mason Crane, and Matt Parkinson. Current state players representing the team include Charlie Stobo, and Daniel Smith.
