= Northern District Cricket Club =

Northern District
Personnel
- Captain: (Australia) Ben Davis
- Coach: (Australia) Brendon Lyon

Team information
- Founded: 1925
- Home ground: Mark Taylor Oval, Waitara
- Capacity: 5,000

Northern District Cricket Club is a cricket club based in the upper North Shore of Sydney at Waitara, New South Wales, Australia. They are also known as the Northern District and play in the Sydney Grade Cricket competition. They were founded in 1894 and entered the Sydney Grade competition in 1925.

The club has played at the Mark Taylor Oval since 1925.

== Notable players ==
- Mark Taylor
- Mitchell Starc
- Alyssa Healy
- Nathan Lyon
- Adam Gilchrist
- Brad Haddin
- Neil Harvey
- Lachlan Shaw
- Alan Davidson
- Charlie Anderson
- Arthur Chipperfield
- Peter Taylor
- Jim Burke
- Ross Edwards
