= Western Suburbs District Cricket Club =

Western Suburbs
Personnel
- Captain: (Australia) James Psarakis
- Coach: (Australia) Chad Porter

Team information
- Colours
- Founded: 1895
- Home ground: Pratten Park
- Capacity: 5,000

Western Suburbs District Cricket Club is a cricket club based in the Inner West of Sydney, New South Wales, Australia, and play in the Sydney Grade Cricket competition. They were founded in 1895 as Burwood. The Western Suburbs District Cricket Club (also known as The Magpies) have produced International Cricketers such as Michael Clarke, Mitchell Starc, Phillip Hughes and Bob Simpson.
