= Greg Mail =

Australian cricketer (born 1978)

Personal information
- Full name: Gregory John Mail
- Born: 29 April 1978 (age 48); Penrith, New South Wales, Australia
- Nickname: Mailman
- Height: 1.91 m (6 ft 3 in)
- Batting: Right-handed
- Bowling: Right-arm medium
- Role: Batsman

Domestic team information
- Years: Team
- 1999/00–2008/09: New South Wales

Career statistics
Competition	First-class	List A
Matches	72	8
Runs scored	4,085	115
Batting average	32.16	23.00
100s/50s	9/19	0/1
Top score	176	58
Balls bowled	895	1
Wickets	14	0
Bowling average	40.28	–
5 wickets in innings	0	–
10 wickets in match	0	–
Best bowling	4/18	–
Catches/stumpings	63/–	5/1
- Source: CricInfo, 17 August 2008

Gregory John Mail (born 29 April 1978) is an Australian former cricket player, who before his retirement was a batsman for the New South Wales. A tall opening batsman with a solid technique, he debuted for New South Wales in 1999–2000, and was awarded the prestigious Bradman Scholar award in 2000. His most successful season was 2003–04, after which he has struggled to hold a place in the first XI. Of the 12 occasions that a NSW player has carried their bat through a completed First Class innings and the 16 occasions that a player has scored a century in each innings of a First Class match, Mail is the only NSW player in history to have achieved both of these feats during his career.

Mail was born at Penrith, New South Wales and attended James Ruse Agricultural High School, the top ranking academic school in NSW. Athletically, Mail dominated his academically minded peers, and was rewarded in 1998 with a scholarship from the New South Wales Blues, which enabled him to spend the English summer playing for Northern in the Liverpool Competition.

In 2007, Mail played for Colne in the Lancashire League, finishing the season as the League's highest scorer with 1,198 runs at 79.86.

Mail is the leading run scorer in the history of Sydney First Grade cricket, surpassing known players such as Victor Trumper and Bobby Simpson. His season 2001/02 ACB Gold player's card has become a rare collector's item.

In 2011/12, he had a strong Sydney Grade Cricket season, winning the grand final and being named the Captain of the Year after breaking the all-time run scoring record, joining Warren Bardsley and Victor Trumper as scorer of most centuries. He also has represented over half the teams in the comp at some time in his career. Australian Test cricketer Stuart Clark was moved to note "[Greg is] the greatest player ever to play Sydney Grade Cricket." He won the Bill O'Reilly Medal as Sydney Grade Cricket Player of the Year again, and was awarded Sydney Grade Cricket Captain of the Year 2011/12.

Mail has been appointed as a member of the NSW cricket selection panel, whilst simultaneously working in the banking sector.

He has now moved past coaching, having been assistant coach at Sydney Sixers, who won the 2012 CLT20 Champions League. He is believed to be the first coach to have earned more than the star players from the winning bonus pool of US$2.5 million.
