= Eastern Suburbs Cricket Club =

- Nickname(s): Dolphins

Personnel
- Captain: TBA
- Coach: Paul Byrom
- Batting coach: Michael Bevan
- Bowling coach: Nathan Bracken

Team information
- Colors: Red, White and Navy Blue
- Founded: 1894
- Home ground: Waverley Oval
- Capacity: 5,000

History
- 1st Grade wins: 8 (1903, 1921, 1922, 1923, 1945, 1976, 1992, 2004)
- 1st Grade Limited–Overs Cup wins: 1 (2004)
- 2nd Grade wins: 16 (1913, 1914, 1915, 1922, 1924, 1929, 1939, 1941, 1942, 1946, 1949, 1950, 1952, 1953, 1969, 1981)
- 3rd Grade wins: 7 (1913, 1915, 1920, 1923, 1930, 1997, 2019)
- 4th Grade wins: 4 (1935, 1957, 1999, 2014)
- 5th Grade wins: 0
- Poidevin–Gray Shield wins: 4 (1927, 1929, 1932, 1972)
- AW Green Shield wins: 4 (1944, 1953, 1964, 1977, 2020)

Eastern Suburbs Cricket Club is a cricket club based in the Eastern Suburbs of Sydney, New South Wales, Australia. They are also known as the Eastern Suburbs or latterly Easts Cricket Club and play in the Sydney Grade Cricket competition. Known for over a century as Waverley Cricket Club, it was formally established in 1878. Eastern Suburbs Cricket Club (Waverley) Incorporated (ESCC) has been a community cricket club since 1894.

== See also ==
- History of Australian cricket
