= North Sydney Cricket Club =

Cricket club in Sydney, New South Wales, Australia

UTS North Sydney District Cricket Club
- Nickname(s): The Bears, Norths

Personnel
- Captain: Mac Jenkins (Men)
- Coach: Simon Keen (Men), Petar Sredojevic (Women)

Team information
- Colours: Red and Black
- Founded: 1858
- Home ground: North Sydney Oval
- Capacity: 16,000

History
- Men's First Grade wins: 5 (1899, 1905, 1908, 1913, 1932)
- First Grade Limited–Overs Cup wins: 5 (1986, 1988, 1993, 1995, 2013)
- Men's Second Grade wins: 10 (1896, 1907, 1908, 1910, 1977, 1985, 1986, 1994, 2001, 2011)
- Women's Second Grade wins: 2 (2024, 2025)
- Men's Third Grade wins: 9 (1902, 1905, 1906, 1908, 1909, 1910, 1911, 1912, 1984)
- Men's Fourth Grade wins: 1 (1969)
- Men's Fifth Grade wins: 2 (1975, 2020)
- Poidevin–Gray Shield wins: 2 (1985, 2024)
- Official website: UTS North Sydney Cricket Club

UTS North Sydney District Cricket Club, formerly known as North Sydney District Cricket Club, is a cricket club based in North Sydney, New South Wales, Australia. The Bears, as they are known, were founded in 1858 playing against Callen Park and other cricket clubs around Sydney at that time. UTS North Sydney currently plays in the NSW Premier Cricket. Having joined in 1893 as one of its founding members, the club is one of oldest elite cricket clubs in Sydney.

The club's home ground is North Sydney Oval. In the 1980s, North Sydney Council purchased some old grandstands from the Sydney Cricket Ground during its re-development, and relocated them to North Sydney Oval. In the 1980s, the club and community recognised the potential of the Miller St location and worked with the then North Sydney Mayor and current club Patron Ted Mack to develop the ground, enhancing its historic character.

In the men's competitions, the Bears have won 5 first grade premierships, 11 second grade cups, 9 third grade titles, 2 fifth grade titles, 2 Poidevin Gray (U21s) titles and 1 AW Green Shield (U16s) premiership.

== Notable players ==
In the club's history, there have been several notable players. These include:

- Sid Barnes
- Nicholas Bills
- Sir Donald Bradman
- Trevor Chappell
- Adam Crosthwaite
- Scott Hookey
- Daniel Hughes
- Jason Krejza
- Jay Lenton
- Charles Macartney
- Stuart MacGill
- Phil Marks
- Stan McCabe
- Keith Miller
- Kerry O'Keeffe
- Bill O'Reilly
- Paddy Shea
- Doug Walters
- Waqar Younis

The club is also home to NSW Premier Cricket First Grade appearances record-holder, Robert Aitken.

== See also ==
- History of Australian cricket
- University of Technology Sydney
