= Dirk Wellham =

Australian cricketer

Personal information
- Full name: Dirk MacDonald Wellham
- Born: 13 March 1959 (age 67); Marrickville, New South Wales, Australia
- Batting: Right-handed

International information
- National side: Australia
- Test debut (cap 314): 27 August 1981 v England
- Last Test: 10 January 1987 v New Zealand
- ODI debut (cap 67): 17 December 1981 v Pakistan
- Last ODI: 9 April 1987 v England

Domestic team information
- Years: Team
- 1980/81–1987/88: New South Wales
- 1988/89–1990/91: Tasmania
- 1991/92–1993/94: Queensland

Career statistics
Competition	Test	ODI
Matches	6	17
Runs scored	257	379
Batting average	23.36	25.26
100s/50s	1/0	0/1
Top score	103	97
Catches/stumpings	5/–	8/–
- Source: CricInfo, 12 December 2005

Dirk MacDonald Wellham (born 13 March 1959) is a former Australian cricketer who played in six Test matches and 17 One Day Internationals (ODIs) between 1981 and 1987. He is one of four players to score a century in both his first class and Test debuts (as of June 2025). He was the first player to captain three Australian states having captained New South Wales, Tasmania and Queensland during his career. As NSW captain, he won the Sheffield Shield in 1984–85 and 1985–86 and the McDonald's Cup in 1984–85.He is the nephew of New South Wales first-class cricketer Walter Wellham.

== Early life ==
Welham was born in Marrickville, New South Wales and attended Ashfield Boys High School.

== Career ==
After scoring two centuries for New South Wales in the 1980–81 Sheffield Shield, including 100 against Victoria on his first-class debut, Wellham was selected for the Australian team to tour England in 1981. On tour, Wellham scored 135 not out against Northamptonshire and was chosen to make his Test debut in the sixth Test at The Oval.

Wellham scored 24 and 103, thus becoming the 12th Australian batsman to score a century on Test debut. Wellham's century was criticised by some commentators for being too slow and costing Australia a chance of victory. After scoring his first 80 runs in under 90 balls, Kim Hughes sent a runner onto the field to tell Wellham to take his time as the series had already been lost and the result didn't matter. Wellham's 103 took 221 balls and he was on 99 for 25 minutes.

He was dropped from both the Test and state teams in the next season, but returned in 1983–84 as captain of New South Wales, winning the first of two consecutive Sheffield Shields that year and a McDonald's Cup in 1984–85. Wellham was recalled to the Australian team for the final Test of the 1985 Ashes tour and again for the final Test of the 1986–87 Ashes series scoring just 36 runs in these two matches. Wellham played 9 of his 17 one day international matches in the 1986–87 World Series Cup, the highlight being 97 against England at Sydney in a match more famous for batsman Allan Lamb hitting Bruce Reid for 18 runs in the final over to win the match.

At first-class level, Wellham scored 8662 runs at an average of 42.25 and scored 16 centuries. In 1987–88, Wellham moved to Tasmania for the 1988–89 season and captained the team for three seasons. In 32 matches for Tasmania, Wellham scored 1629 runs at an average of 39.73 scoring 15 fifties but no centuries.

At the start of the 1991–92 season, Wellham moved to Brisbane to take up a teaching position with the Anglican Church Grammar School. He joined the Eastern Suburbs club and was selected for Queensland. Wellham scored 873 runs at 58.20 including two centuries, his best run-scoring season since 1982–83.

On 11 December 1992, Wellham captained Queensland for the first time, thus becoming the first player to captain three Australian states. He captained Queensland in 8 first-class matches that season including their loss to NSW in the Sheffield Shield final. Wellham played three more matches for Queensland in 1993–94 before retiring from first-class cricket.

== Post-cricket career ==
Wellham previously served as Deputy Principal (Academic) at Anglican Church Grammar School. He was appointed as Principal of Caloundra City Private School in 2013. He received a PhD from Deakin University in 2009.

Preceded by David Boon	Tasmanian First-class cricket captains 1987/88–90/91	Succeeded by Rod Tucker
Preceded by David Boon	Tasmanian One-day cricket captains 1988/89–90/91	Succeeded by Rod Tucker
