= St George District Cricket Club =

- Nickname: Saints
- League: NSW Premier Cricket

Personnel
- Captain: Club: Luke Bartier & Paul Francis; First Grade: Nick Stapleton & Matt Rogers; Second Grade: Mitch Gray; Third Grade: Nathan Anderson & Jackson Shaw; Fourth Grade: Matthew Baden; Fifth Grade: Paul Witherly
- Coach: Andrew Walsh

Team information
- City: St George, Sydney
- Colours: Red and White
- Founded: 1911
- Home ground: Hurstville Oval
- Capacity: 5,000

History
- Club Championship wins: 24
- First Grade (Belvidere Cup) wins: 18
- First Grade Limited-Overs Cup wins: 2
- Kingsgrove Sports T20 wins: 2

St George District Cricket Club is a cricket club based in the St. George area that competes in NSW Premier Cricket. The club has a proud history and has produced many notable Australian Test cricketers.

The club has played its home games at Hurstville Oval since 1921.

== History ==
The St George District Cricket Club was established in 1911 as a sub-district team under the auspices of the New South Wales Cricket Association, with Mr J. Lister serving as its first president. At that time, Hurstville Oval, later to become the club's home ground, was not yet enclosed. The oval occupied part of Hurstville Park, a seven-acre site purchased from the McMahon Estate in the early 1900s and managed by the local council. Development of the ground was largely driven by local cricket enthusiasts, who fenced and landscaped the area over several years.

The official opening of Hurstville Oval took place in 1911, marked by a match between a St George representative side and an invitational XI led by Australian Test batsman Warren Bardsley.

St George entered the Sydney Grade Cricket competition in 1921, initially fielding teams in First, Second and Third Grade. The club also competed in the Shires competition from 1926 to 1947 and again between 1965 and 1968. A Fourth Grade side was introduced in 1934 and, aside from a wartime hiatus between 1940 and 1948, has continued ever since. With the introduction of Fifth Grade in 1969, St George withdrew from the Shires competition entirely.

Today, St George competes in the New South Wales Premier Cricket competition, fielding sides in First to Fifth Grade, as well as in the Poidevin-Gray Shield (Under-21), A.W. Green Shield (Under-16), and First Grade Limited-Overs competitions.

== Notable players ==
Since its founding in 1911, many of its members have represented both Australia in international cricket and New South Wales at the state level.

=== International representatives ===
The following players have taken part in international matches:

- Don Bradman (1928–1932) – Universally regarded as the greatest batsman in cricket history, Bradman represented St George before leading Australia through its golden era.
- Alan Fairfax (1928–1931) – A talented all-rounder whose dynamic performances for St George earned him Test selection in the late 1920s.
- Bill O’Reilly (1935–1946) – The legendary leg-spinner famed for his control, turn, and fierce competitiveness.
- Arthur Morris (1946–1952) – Graceful opening batsman and member of Don Bradman's celebrated 1948 “Invincibles” touring side.
- Ray Lindwall (1946–1952) – One of Australia's finest fast bowlers, known for combining express pace with classical batting ability.
- Bill Watson (1954–1957) – Stylish top-order batsman who represented Australia in the mid-1950s.
- Norm O'Neill (1957–1964) – Prolific stroke-maker hailed as one of Australia's brightest batting talents of his generation.
- Brian Booth (1960–1965) – Former Australian Test captain and dual international who also represented Australia in hockey.
- Kerry O'Keeffe (1969–1977) – Leg-spinner and later broadcaster, remembered for his skill, intelligence, and humour on and off the field.
- Murray Bennett (1984–1985) – Left-arm orthodox spinner who played Tests and ODIs for Australia in the mid-1980s.
- Stuart MacGill (2000–2003) – Leg-spinner renowned for sharp turn and aggression, partnering Shane Warne in several Tests.
- Moises Henriques (2008) – All-rounder and long-time NSW captain, representing Australia in all formats of the game.
- Josh Hazlewood (2010) – Premier fast bowler and mainstay of the Australian Test and ODI sides since the 2010s.
- Trent Copeland (2011) – Reliable right-arm seamer and long-serving NSW representative who earned Test honours in 2011.
- Kurtis Patterson (2019) – Top-order batsman who made his Test debut for Australia in 2019 after years of consistent first-class form.
- Mark Stoneman - Made his England Test debut in 2017, playing 11 Tests with 5 half-centuries.
- Rory Burns - Made his England debut in 2018, playing 32 Test matches making 3 centuries with a top score of 133 against Australia in the opening game of the 2019 Ashes series.

=== State representatives ===
The following players have represented New South Wales:

- Don Bradman
- Alan Fairfax
- Bill O’Reilly
- Arthur Morris
- Ray Lindwall
- Bill Watson
- Brian Booth
- Norm O'Neill
- Kerry O'Keeffe
- Murray Bennett
- Stuart MacGill
- Moises Henriques
- Josh Hazlewood
- Trent Copeland
- Kurtis Patterson
- David Mullarkey
- Leo Vaughan
- Arthur Scanes
- Harry Theak
- Reg Little
- Alf Lonergan
- Harold Stapleton
- Ray Cristofani
- Robert Moss
- Eric Lukeman
- Bill Yeates
- Bill Saunders
- Kevin Francis
- Jack O’Reilly
- Ron Flockton
- Peter Leslie
- Jim Martin
- Jack Rogers
- Jack Wilson
- Ron Done
- John Skilbeck
- Bill Seabrook
- Graham Smith
- Peter Stepto
- Doug Moore
- Geoff Milliken
- Brian McNamara
- Peter Alley
- Neil Jones
- Jordan Silk
- Greg Rummans
- Brad Van Deinsen
- Nick Pilon
- Blake Nikitaras
- Blake Macdonald
