= Corey Richards =

Australian cricketer (born 1975)

Personal information
- Full name: Corey John Richards
- Born: 25 August 1975 (age 51); Camden, New South Wales, Australia
- Batting: Right-handed
- Bowling: Right-arm medium
- Role: Batsman

Domestic team information
- Years: Team
- 1995/96–2005/06: New South Wales
- 1999–2006: Scotland

Career statistics
Competition	First-class	List A
Matches	55	81
Runs scored	2,953	2,176
Batting average	31.41	32.47
100s/50s	7/15	3/12
Top score	164	151
Balls bowled	84	177
Wickets	0	3
Bowling average	–	40.66
5 wickets in innings	–	0
10 wickets in match	–	0
Best bowling	–	2/12
Catches/stumpings	27/–	36/–
- Source: CricInfo, 4 December 2007

Corey John Richards (born 25 August 1975) is a former Australian first-class cricketer. He was born at Camden, New South Wales in 1975.

== Career ==
In 1995–96 Richards made his first-class debut for New South Wales and was relied upon as a solid top-order batsman when he won the NSW Player of the Year award in 1998–99. A poor season in 2002–03 saw him dropped from the state side.

In the 2005–06 season, the 30-year-old Richards received a surprise call up to the New South Wales squad and returned in both ING Cup and Pura Cup matches. His performances were average at best, with a top score of 62 in the ING Cup competition so far.

Richards made his List A debut in the 1996–97 English season and made his last appearance in 2006 for the Scotland.
