= Deaths in November 1987 =

The following is a list of notable deaths in November 1987.

Entries for each day are listed alphabetically by surname. A typical entry lists information in the following sequence:

- Name, age, country of citizenship at birth, subsequent country of citizenship (if applicable), reason for notability, cause of death (if known), and reference.

== November 1987 ==
=== 1 ===
- Aldo Bozzi, 78, Italian lawyer and politician.
- Tommy Burns, 93, Australian rugby league footballer.
- Cameron Cobbold, 83, British banker, Governor of the Bank of England.
- Bill Donald, 88, Australian rules footballer.
- Leo Goldberg, 74, American astronomer (solar physics), cancer.
- Yoo Jae-ha, 25, South Korean singer and songwriter, car accident.
- René Lévesque, 65, Canadian politician, Premier of Quebec, heart attack.
- Pierre Matignon, 44, French racing cyclist.
- Tom Parker, 89, English international footballer and manager (Arsenal, Southampton, England).
- Mary Shane, 42, American Major League baseball commentator, heart attack.

=== 2 ===
- Harold Crisler, 63, American basketball and NFL player.
- Michael DeBatt, 38, American mobster of the Gambino crime family, murdered.
- Louise McCarren Herring, 78, American who established the Credit Union National Association.
- Friedrich-Karl "Nasen" Müller, 75, Nazi German Luftwaffe night fighter ace.
- Wilhelm Schöning, 79, Nazi German Army commander.
- Elmer Tarbox, 71, American politician, member of Texas House of Representatives, Parkinson's disease.

=== 3 ===
- Giorgi Antadze, 67, Soviet Georgian Olympic footballer (1952).
- André Roussin, 76, French playwright.
- Liang Shih-chiu, 84, Chinese writer, translator and literary theorist.

=== 4 ===
- Óscar Bonfiglio, 82, Mexican international footballer (Marte, Mexico) and Olympian.
- Vernon Evans, 94, American military officer.
- Danielle Gaubert, 44, French actress, cancer.
- Babe Plunket Greene, 80, English socialite.
- Tor Halvorsen, 56, Norwegian trade unionist and politician.
- Wilton M. Krogman, 83, American anthropologist, recipient of Viking Fund Medal.
- G. Delbert Morris, 78, American politician, member of the California State Assembly (1947-1956).
- Garland Morrow, 88, American college football and basketball player and coach.
- Francis Pollen, 60, English architect (Worth Abbey).
- Pierre Seghers, 81, French poet and editor, member of the French Resistance.
- Raphael Soyer, 87, Russian-born American painter and printmaker, cancer.
- A. L. Swanson, 82, American collegiate coach.
- Paulin Soumanou Vieyra, 62, Senegalese-French film director and historian.

=== 5 ===
- Eamonn Andrews, 64, Irish radio and television presenter, heart failure.
- Edvard Baghdasaryan, 64, Armenian composer.
- Orlando Costas, 55, Puerto Rican evangelical theologian, stomach cancer.
- Daasarathi, 62, Indian Telugu poet and writer.
- Peg Fenwick, 79, American screenwriter and playwright (Whirlpool of Desire, All That Heaven Allows).
- Georges Franju, 75, French filmmaker.
- Elimelekh Rimalt, 80, Israeli politician, member of the Knesset (1951-1977).
- Arthur Schmidt, 92, German military officer, Sixth Army's chief of staff in the Battle of Stalingrad.
- Willy Tschopp, 82, Swiss Olympic sprinter (1928).
- Juliet Rice Wichman, 86, American conservationist, botanist and author.

=== 6 ===
- Zohar Argov, 32, Israeli singer and convicted rapist, suicide.
- Ross Barnett, 89, American politician, Governor of Mississippi.
- Eugenio Bonicco, 68, Italian Olympic alpine skier (1948).
- Opie Cates, 78, American clarinet player, band leader and radio actor.
- Michael Comay, 79, Israeli diplomat, ambassador to Canada and the U.K.
- Alvin Dewey, 75, American special agent of the Kansas Bureau of Investigation, stroke.
- George Laurence, 82, Canadian nuclear physicist.
- Jean Rivier, 91, French composer of classical music.
- Les Whitfield, 79, Australian rules footballer.

=== 7 ===
- Arne Borg, 86, Swedish swimmer, 5-time Olympic gold medalist and holder of multiple world records.
- Herbert H. Chen, 45, Chinese-born American theoretical and experimental physicist (particle physics), leukemia.
- Charlie Dowdall, 89, Irish Olympic footballer (1924).
- Aileen Eaton, 78, Canadian-born American boxing and professional wrestling promoter.
- Charles Holland, 77, American singer and actor.
- Albert Mulder, 98, Dutch painter.
- Arthur Willis, 67, English footballer.

=== 8 ===
- Edward Willis Barnett, 88, American naval officer and Olympic fencer (1928).
- Willem van den Berg, 77, Dutch Olympic fencer (1948).
- Kid Chissell, 82, American boxing champion and actor.
- Jim Fitzgerald, 65, American racing driver, racing crash.
- Ian Fraser, 71, British politician, Member of Parliament.
- Boris Goldstein, 64, Soviet violinist.
- Yevgeniya Khanayeva, 66, Soviet film and stage actress.
- Sakthi T. K. Krishnasamy, 74, Indian author, screenwriter and lyricist.
- Perrault LaRue, 62, Canadian politician, member of the House of Commons of Canada (1958-1962).

=== 9 ===
- Mervyn Burden, 57, English cricketer.
- Ed Cihocki, 80, American MLB player (Philadelphia Athletics).
- Norman Coslett, 78, Welsh RAF officer.
- Eemeli, 67, Finnish actor, comedian and entertainer.
- Akhtar Hussain, 61, Indian and Pakistani hockey player and Olympic gold medalist.
- Washington Jones, 62, American Olympic boxer (1948).
- Harry Rusan, 77, American baseball player.
- Johann Schalk, 84, Austrian-born Nazi German flying ace.
- Thengai Srinivasan, 50, Indian Tamil actor (Thillu Mullu), brain haemorrhage.
- Frank Vecera, 50, American paralympic athlete, snooker and wheelchair basketball player.
- Volodymyr Yemets, 50, Soviet Ukrainian footballer and manager.

=== 10 ===
- Lou Breslow, 87, American screenwriter and film director.
- Gotfryd Gremlowski, 56, Polish Olympic swimmer (1952).
- Faruk Kaiser, 69, Indian Urdu poet.
- Seyni Kountché, 56, Nigerien military officer, President of Niger, brain tumour.
- Pop Momand, 100, American cartoonist (Keeping Up with the Joneses).
- Raymond Rohauer, 62–63, American film collector and distributor, AIDS (heart attack reported at the time).
- Bubby Sadler, 78, American baseball player.
- Jackie Vernon, 63, American stand-up comedian and actor (Frosty the Snowman), heart attack.

=== 11 ===
- Francis Adams, 34, Trinidadian Olympic sprinter (1976, 1980).
- Charles H. Baker Jr., 91, American author known for culinary and cocktail writings.
- Earnshaw Cook, 87, American proponent of baseball sabermetrics, heart attack.
- John 'Dusty' King, 78, American singer and film actor (Range Busters).
- John McCormack, 62, American Olympic diver (1952).
- Channing E. Phillips, 59, American minister, civil rights leader and social activist, cancer.

=== 12 ===
- George Chatterton, 75, British Army soldier, commanded the Glider Pilot Regiment.
- Roger Lewis, 75, American business executive, assistant United States Secretary of the Air Force.
- Lasgush Poradeci, 87, Albanian philologist, poet and writer.
- Menachem Ratzon, 68, Israeli politician, member of the Knesset (1951).
- John E. Sheridan, 85, American politician, member of the United States House of Representatives (1939-1947).
- Ferenc Várkõi, 71, Hungarian Olympic gymnast (1948).
- Cornelis Vreeswijk, 50, Dutch-born Swedish singer-songwriter, poet and actor.

=== 13 ===
- Alois Cetkovský, 79, Czech Olympic ice hockey player (1936).
- Jayatirtha Dasa, 39, British Hare Krishna, murdered.
- A. L. Abdul Majeed, 54, Sri Lankan politician, Member of Parliament, assassinated.
- Paul Neergaard, 80, Danish agronomist, mycologist and agriculturist (seed pathology).
- Joseph Phillips, 76, Indian hockey player and Olympic gold medalist (1936).
- Franklin D. Richards, 86, American commissioner of the U.S. Federal Housing Administration, authority of the LDS church.
- William Rogers, 85, American Olympic rugby union player (1924).
- Galliano Rossini, 60, Italian Olympic sports shooter (1952, 1956, 1960, 1964, 1968).
- Harold Vick, 51, American jazz saxophonist and flautist, heart attack.

=== 14 ===
- Friedrich Bopp, 77, German theoretical physicist.
- Ann Christy, 82, American film actress, heart attack.
- Roger Fleetwood-Hesketh, 85, British politician, Member of Parliament.
- Petras Griškevičius, 63, Lithuanian communist party official.
- Hod Lisenbee, 89, American Major League baseball player (Boston Red Sox).
- Pieter Menten, 88, Dutch Nazi war criminal.
- Buster Mott, 78, American NFL player.

=== 15 ===
- Ernő Goldfinger, 85, Hungarian-born British architect and furniture designer.
- Floyd Konetsky, 67, American NFL player (Cleveland Rams).
- Kyösti Lehtonen, 56, Finnish Olympic wrestler (1956, 1960, 1964).
- Shyamal Mitra, 58, Indian playback singer and music director.
- Red Robertson, 76, American football and basketball coach.
- Brigid Lyons Thornton, 91, Irish member of Cumann na mBan, Irish Free State Army officer, heart attack.

=== 16 ===
- Jim Brewer, 50, American Major League baseball player (Los Angeles Dodgers), car accident.
- Jim Currie, 70, American basketball player.
- Terrence Des Pres, 48, American writer and Holocaust scholar, suicide.
- Junpei Eto, 89, Japanese painter.
- Harold Rumney, 80, Australian rules footballer.
- Zubir Said, 80, Indonesian-born Singaporean composer, composed Singapore's national anthem, liver failure.
- Trevor Stamp, 80, British medical doctor and bacteriologist, member of the House of Lords.

=== 17 ===
- Ganesh Baba, 97, Indian yogi.
- Gladys Carson, 84, British Olympic swimmer (1924).
- Betty Corday, 75, American Broadway actress and television producer (Days of Our Lives), respiratory failure.
- Paul Derringer, 81, American Major League baseball player (Cincinnati Reds).
- Yisrael Kargman, 80, Israeli politician, member of the Knesset (1957-1977).
- Hiroshi Kawaguchi, 51, Japanese film actor.
- Gerry Lockran, 45, British blues singer, songwriter and guitarist, heart attack.
- Arthur C. Pierce, 64, American screenwriter and director.
- Bertie Ross, 77-78, New Zealand cricketer.
- Jean Saenen, 82, Belgian Olympic wrestler (1928).
- Ireene Wicker, 81, American singer and actress (Deadline Dramas).

=== 18 ===
- Jacques Anquetil, 53, French road racing cyclist, five-time Tour de France winner, stomach cancer.
- Mozzafar Baghai, 75, Iranian politician, Member of Parliament.
- Edward Both, 79, Australian medical and military inventor ("Iron Lung").
- Lynn Freeman Olson, 49, American composer, cancer.
- Hubert Patch, 82, British RAF commander.
- George Ryga, 55, Canadian playwright, actor and novelist (The Ecstasy of Rita Joe).
- Dick Stello, 53, American Major League baseball umpire, traffic accident.
- Colin Townsley, 45, English station officer at Soho Fire Station, killed in the King's Cross fire.
- Bertie Watson, 89, Australian cricketer.

=== 19 ===
- Len Aston, 67, English rugby league footballer.
- Brand Blanshard, 95, American philosopher.
- Lee Byung-chul, 77, South Korean businessman, founded Samsung.
- Frank Cheshire, 91, Australian bookseller and publisher.
- Ben Clopton, 81, American artist known for animated cartoons.
- Jock Colville, 72, British diarist.
- George Hayes, 73, Canadian ice hockey player and official.
- Russell Hill, 67, Australian rules footballer.
- Norman Jones, 64, New Zealand politician, Member of Parliament, brain tumour.
- Alastair MacDonald Watson, 78, English cricketer.
- Dave Odom, 69, American MLB player (Boston Braves).
- Clara Petrella, 73, Italian operatic soprano.
- Christopher Wilmarth, 44, American artist known for sculptures of glass and steel, suicide.

=== 20 ===
- Christopher Evelyn Blunt, 83, British merchant banker.
- Peter Button, 58, New Zealand rescue helicopter pilot, helicopter crash.
- Helen Grace Scott Keenan, 72, American broadcaster for Free France in Brazzaville, heart attack.
- Anthony Waters, 59, Australian Olympic field hockey player (1964).

=== 21 ===
- Dusty Cooke, 80, American MLB player, coach, and manager.
- Alex Diggelmann, 85, Swiss graphic artist and book designer.
- Jim Folsom, 79, American politician, Governor of Alabama.
- Merv Harvey, 65, Australian rules footballer.
- Ivan Jandl, 50, Czech child actor (The Search), diabetes.
- Karel Raška, 78, Czech medical doctor and epidemiologist, helped eradicate smallpox.
- Axel Ståhle, 96, Swedish army officer and Olympic horse rider (1924).

=== 22 ===
- Verna Arvey, 77, American librettist, pianist and writer.
- Helmut Aris, 79, German president of the Association of Jewish Communities.
- Bill Beath, 66, Australian cricketer.
- Hemanga Biswas, 74, Indian singer, composer and author.
- W. Haydon Burns, 75, American politician, Governor of Florida.
- Plácido Domingo Ferrer, 80, Spanish zarzuela baritone, father of Plácido Domingo, heart attack.
- Raymond D. Mindlin, 81, American mechanical engineer, professor of Applied Science at Columbia University.
- Newt Perry, 79, American swimmer, attraction promoter and swimming coach.
- Ken Rosewarne, 76, Australian rules footballer.

=== 23 ===
- Alton Adams, 98, American bandmaster in the U.S. Navy.
- Joseph Beer, 79, Polish-French composer of operettas, singspiele and operas.
- Sam Gilbert, 73–74, American businessman, money launderer.
- Marcia Henderson, 58, American actress (Peter Pan).
- Solomana Kante, 64–65, Guinean writer, inventor of the N'Ko alphabet.
- Sarah Long, 49, English actress and television presenter (Play School), cancer.
- Mark Peachey 87, Australian cricketer.
- Keith Sarovich, 72, Australian cricketer.
- Antonio Sastre, 76, Argentinian international footballer (Club Atlético Independiente, Argentina).
- Tsutomu Sekido, 72, Japanese Olympic skier (1936).
- Rajen Tarafdar, 70, Indian film director, actor and screenwriter.
- Victor Windeyer, 87, Australian judge and soldier, justice of the High Court of Australia.

=== 24 ===
- Jehane Benoît, 83, Canadian culinary author, journalist and broadcaster.
- Stan Hanson, 71, English footballer (Bolton Wanderers).
- Gunnar Heckscher, 78, Swedish political scientist, leader of the Conservative Party.
- Ove Joensen, 38, Faroese adventurer, first person to row from the Faroe Islands to Denmark, drowned.
- John Norton, 88, American Olympic water polo player (1924).
- John Parker, 81, British politician, Member of Parliament.
- Anton Pieck, 92, Dutch painter, artist and graphic artist.
- Jim Russell, 69, American Major League baseball player (Pittsburgh Pirates).
- Eddie Teague, 65, American college football and soccer coach.

=== 25 ===
- Edgar Berman, 72, American surgeon and author, remembered for misogynist comments, heart attack.
- Dick Booth, 69, American NFL player (Detroit Lions).
- Jack Brown, 85, American NFL player.
- Francisco Dalupan Sr., 92, Filipino founder, chairman and president of the University of the East.
- Wolfgang Fischer, 59, German Olympic hurdler (1960).
- Little Willy Foster, 65, American blues harmonicist, singer and songwriter, kidney cancer.
- Ben C. Henley, 80, American lawyer and politician, Arkansas Republican Party State Chairman.
- Roy Henry, 80, Australian rules footballer.
- George Korngold, 58, Austrian-born American record producer and producer, son of composer Erich Korngold, cancer.
- Renzo Marignano, 64, Italian actor and film director.
- James McDyer, 77, Irish Catholic priest.
- Ramaswamy Parameshwaran, 41, Indian military officer, killed in battle.
- Harold Washington, 65, American politician, Mayor of Chicago, member of U.S. House of Representatives (1981-1983), heart attack.

=== 26 ===
- Bill Giant, 57, American songwriter, wrote for Elvis Presley.
- J. P. Guilford, 90, American psychologist (psychometrics).
- Peter Hujar, 53, American photographer, AIDS.
- Costache Ioanid, 74, Romanian poet and songwriter.
- Thomas George Lanphier Jr., 71, Panama-born American fighter pilot in World War II, cancer.
- Morton Lowry, 73, British actor (The Hound of the Baskervilles, How Green Was My Valley), heart failure.
- Louis Macouillard, 74, American artist and commercial illustrator.
- J. K. Ralston, 91, American painter.
- Duncan Sandys, 79, British politician, Secretary of State for the Colonies.
- Raymond Westerling, 68, Dutch military officer of the Royal Netherlands East Indies Army, coup leader, cardiac arrest.
- Oscar Wrigley, 74, New Zealand cricketer and rugby union player.

=== 27 ===
- Charline Arthur, 58, American singer of boogie-woogie, blues and rockabilly, atherosclerosis.
- Girdhari Lal Dogra, 72, Indian politician, member of the Jammu and Kashmir Legislative Assembly.
- Babe Herman, 84, American Major League baseball player (Brooklyn Robins), pneumonia and strokes.
- Sian Kingi, 12, New Zealand-Australian murder victim.
- Ed Merkle, 70, American NFL player (Washington Redskins).
- John Muafangejo, 44, Namibian artist, heart attack.
- Lillian Bostwick Phipps, 81, American socialite, owner of thoroughbred steeplechase racehorses.
- Julius Rehborn, 87, German diver and Olympian.
- Ernest Severn, 54, American child screen actor.
- Ganda Singh, 87, Indian Punjabi and Sikh historian.
- Ella P. Stewart, 94, American pharmacist.

=== 28 ===
- Paul Arma, 82, Hungarian-French pianist and composer.
- Choh Hao Li, 74, Chinese-born American biochemist (growth hormone), cancer.
- Wolfgang Liebeneiner, 82, German actor and director.
- Guy Marks, 64, American actor, comedian and singer (The Joey Bishop Show).
- Elisabeth Mulder, 83, Spanish writer, poet and journalist.
- Rubén Pagliari, 60, Argentine Olympic basketball player (1952).
- Goh Choo San, 39, Singaporean-born American ballet dancer and choreographer (The Washington Ballet), AIDS.
- Vasily Sitnikov, 72, Russian painter.
- Kazuharu Sonoda, 31, Japanese professional wrestler, plane crash.
- Víctor Yturbe, 51, Mexican singer (stage name "El Pirulí"), murdered.

=== 29 ===
- Spencer Alexander, 71, American baseball player (Newark Eagles).
- Giuseppe Gabrielli, 84, Italian aeronautics engineer, designer of Italian military aircraft.
- Monk Gibbon, 90–91, Irish poet and writer.
- Irene Handl, 85, British author and actress, cancer.
- Settimo Innocenti, 83, Italian racing cyclist.
- Abraham Kazen, 68, American politician, member of the U.S. House of Representatives (1967-1985).
- Gwendolyn MacEwen, 46, Canadian poet and novelist, illness related to alcoholism.
- John Howard Pyle, 81, American broadcaster and politician, Governor of Arizona.
- Aage Samuelsen, 72, Norwegian evangelist, singer and composer, heart attack.

=== 30 ===
- Alex Carey, 64, Australian social psychologist, suicide.
- Simon Carmiggelt, 74, Dutch writer, journalist and poet, heart attack.
- Arthur Dean, 89, American corporate lawyer and diplomat, pneumonia.
- Jimmy George, 32, Indian volleyball player, captain of Indian national volleyball team, car accident.
- Helmut Horten, 78, German entrepreneur, owner of Horten AG department store chain.
- Scrappy Lambert, 86, American dance-band vocalist.
- Jim Lundberg, 66, Australian rules footballer.
- Roger Manvell, 78, British director of the British Film Academy, stroke.
- Hanni Rehborn, 80, German diver and Olympian.
- Don Sebastian, 76, Mexican-born American wrestler, wrestling promoter and movie actor.
- Cyril White, 78, South African cricketer.
- Alberts Zvejnieks, 84, Latvian Olympic wrestler (1928, 1936).

=== Unknown date ===
- Violet Aitken, 101, British suffragette.
- Martha Harris, 68, British psychoanalyst.

== Sources ==
- Liebman, Roy (2000). The Wampas Baby Stars: A Biographical Dictionary, 1922–1934. Jefferson, North Carolina: McFarland. ISBN 0-7864-0756-5.
