= Cyril White =

Cyril White may refer to:

- Brudenell White (Cyril Brudenell Bingham White, 1876–1940), Australian general
- Cyril White (advocate) (Cyril Charles William White, 1909–1984), New Zealand musician and advocate for the blind
- Cyril White (cricketer) (1909-1987), South African cricketer
- Cyril Tenison White (1890–1950), Australian botanist "C.T.White"
