= 1975 Birthday Honours (New Zealand) =

Awards list for New Zealand

The 1975 Queen's Birthday Honours in New Zealand, celebrating the official birthday of Elizabeth II, were appointments made by the Queen on the advice of the New Zealand government to various orders and honours to reward and highlight good works by New Zealanders. They were announced on 14 June 1975.

The recipients of honours are displayed here as they were styled before their new honour.

== Knight Bachelor ==
- Charles Moihi Te Arawaka Bennett DSO – of Maketu. For public services, especially to the Māori people.
- Frank Wakefield Holmes JP – of Wellington; professor of money and finance, Victoria University of Wellington. For public services.
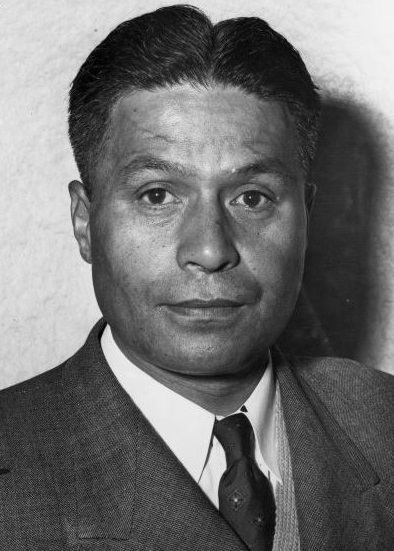
Sir Charles Bennett

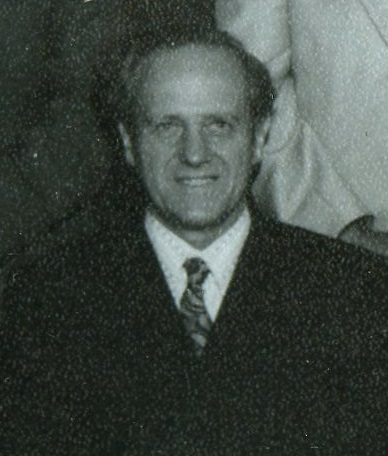
Sir Frank Holmes

== Order of the Bath ==
=== Companion (CB) ===
Military division

- Rear Admiral Edward Courtney Thorne CBE – Chief of Naval Staff.

== Order of Saint Michael and Saint George ==
=== Knight Commander (KCMG) ===
- The Honourable Arnold Henry Nordmeyer CMG JP – of Wellington. For public services.
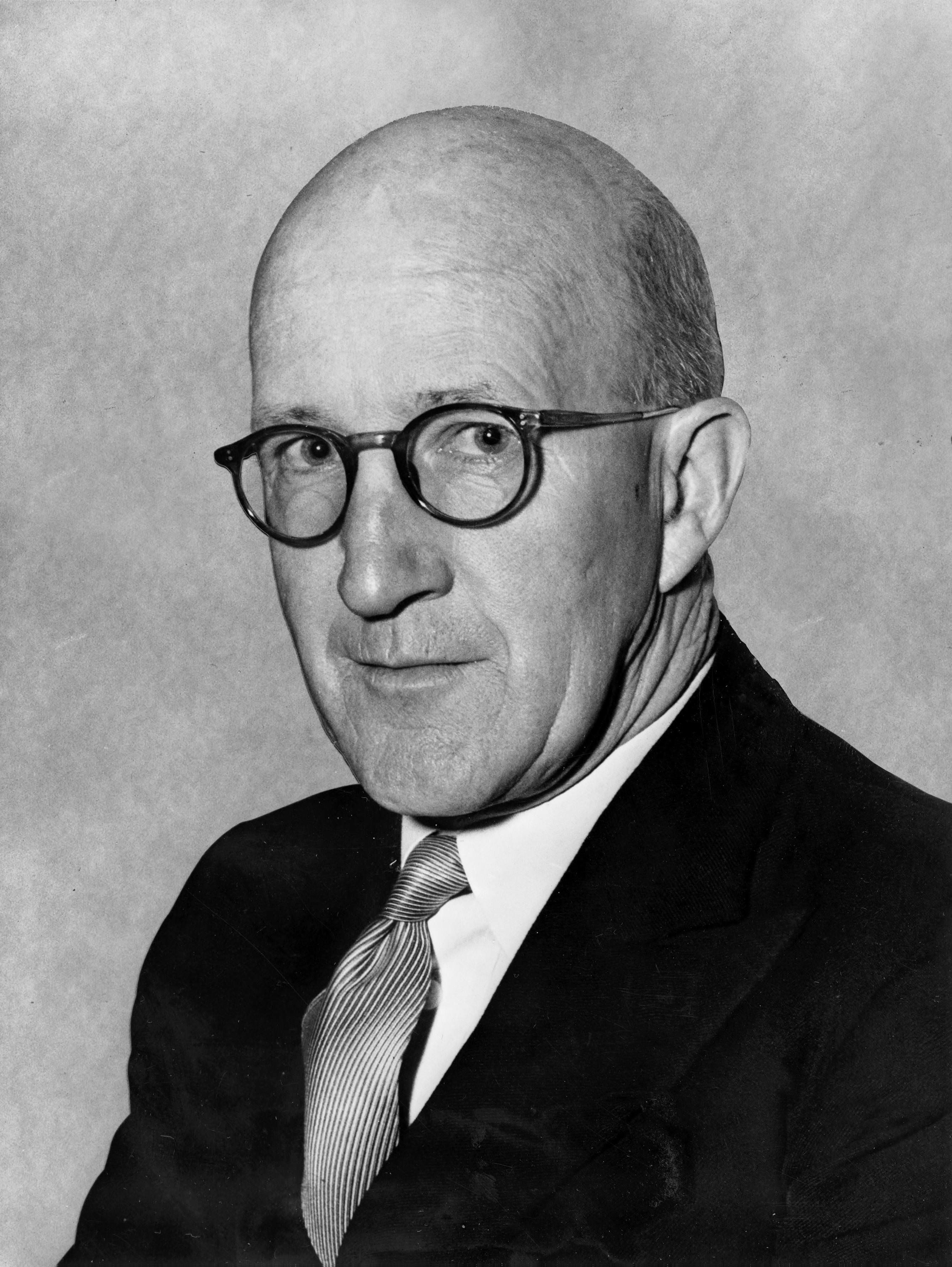
Sir Arnold Nordmeyer

=== Companion (CMG) ===
- Ronald Keith Davison QC – of Auckland. For public services.
- The Honourable William Arthur Fox – of Ōtaki. For public services.
- Jock Malcolm McEwen – of Heretaunga; lately Secretary of Maori Affairs.
- Andrew Gordon Robb – of Wellington. For public services.
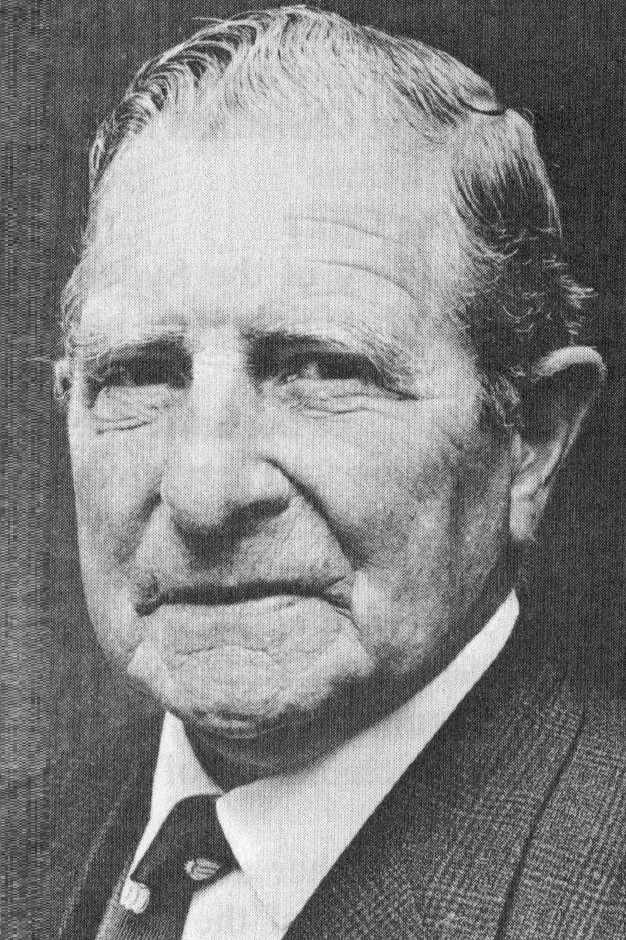
Bill Fox

== Order of the British Empire ==
=== Knight Commander (KBE) ===
Civil division

- George Ernest Francis Wood OBE ISO – of Whangārei. For public services, especially as chairman of the Consumer Council since 1959.

=== Commander (CBE) ===
Civil division

- George James Brocklehurst OBE – of Auckland. For services as New Zealand High Commissioner to the Cook Islands, 1972–1975.
- The Right Reverend John Tristram Holland – currently in England. For services as Bishop of Waikato, 1951–1969, and Bishop of Polynesia, 1969–1975.
- Michael Rotohiko Jones OBE MM JP – of Ōtorohanga. For services to the Māori people.
- Pérrine Moncrieff JP – of Wakapuaka. For services to conservation as a naturalist and to the Abel Tasman National Park.
- Michael James Moriarty – of Wellington. For public services.
- Michael Bernard Scully – currently Chief Justice of Western Samoa; formerly of Wellington. For services as a stipendiary magistrate.

Military division

- Air Commodore Cyril Laurence Siegert MVO DFC AFC ADC – Royal New Zealand Air Force; Assistant Chief of Defence Staff (Policy).
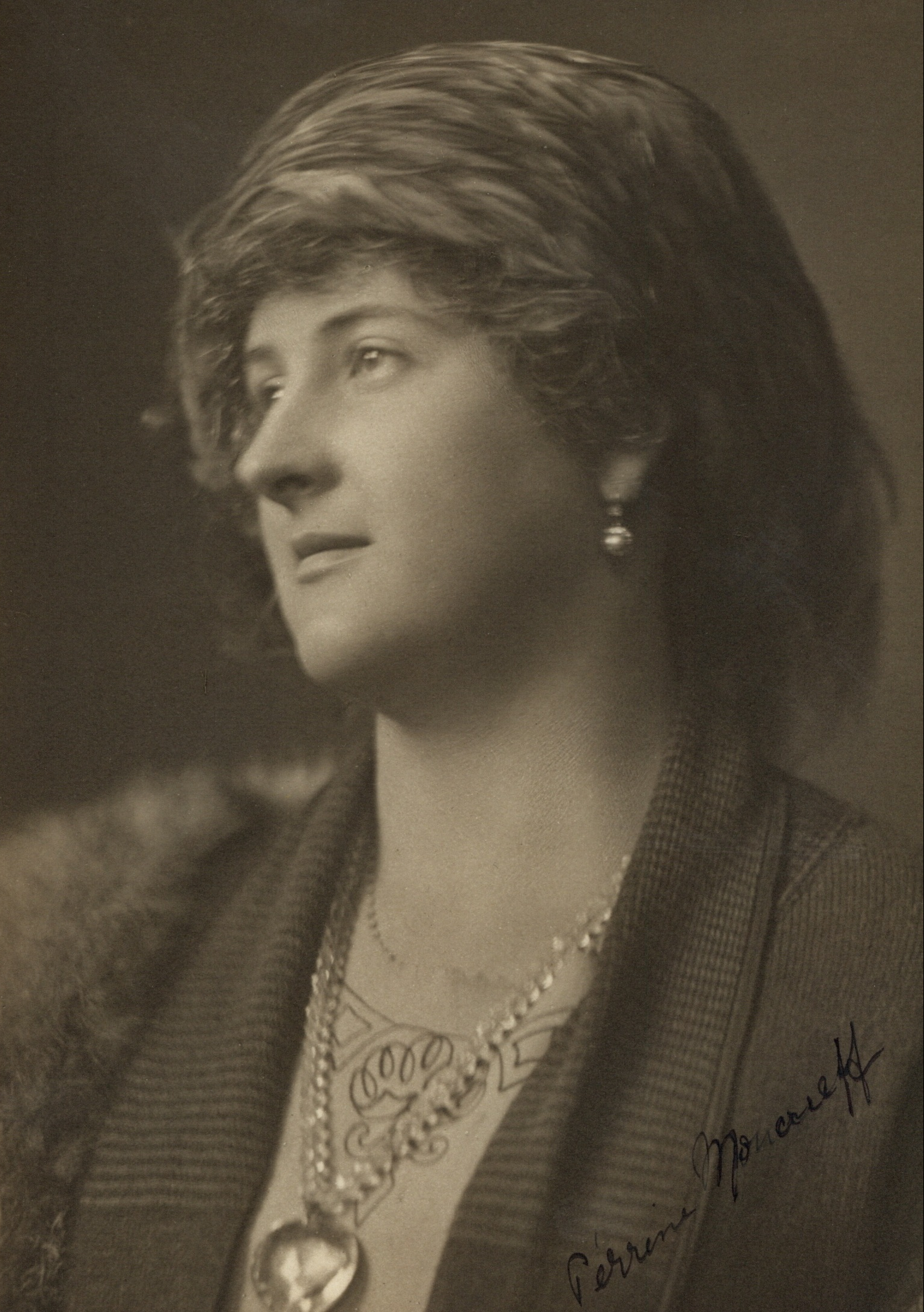
Pérrine Moncrieff

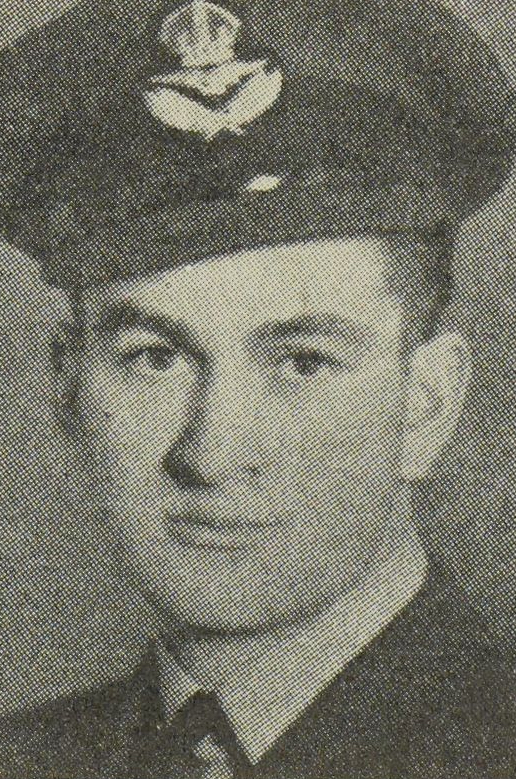
Larry Siegert

=== Officer (OBE) ===
Civil division

- Lewis George Anderson – of Lower Hutt; lately assistant director-general (social work), Department of Social Welfare.
- Dorothy Beatrice Campbell – of Taupō. For services as founder of the New Zealand Pony Clubs Association Incorporated.
- Harold Edward Coxhead – of Timaru. For services to the tourist and travel industry, especially as chairman of the Tourist Hotel Corporation.
- Walter Atcherley Dew – of Dannevirke. For services to local government and the woollen industry.
- Brenda Gardner – of Whangārei. For services to the community and nursing.
- Emma Potiki Grooby JP – of Dunedin. For services to the community and Māori people.
- William James Henderson – of Wellington; chief fire service officer, New Zealand Fire Service Commission.
- Iris May, Lady Kitts – of Wellington. For services to the community as mayoress of the City of Wellington, 1956–1974.
- Clutha Nantes Mackenzie JP – of Scargill, Christchurch. For services to local government.
- Juan Matteucci – of Auckland. For services to music.
- Frederick Walter Gascoyne Miller – of Invercargill. For services to the community and literature.
- Eric Alderson Missen – of Plimmerton; Secretary for Justice, 1970–1974.
- John Massy Stacpoole – of Auckland. For services to the preservation of historic buildings.
- Rewi Tamihana – of Petone. For services to the Māori people.
- Areginald James Waghorn JP – of Wellington. For services to education and art.
- Cyril Charles William White – of Auckland. For services to the blind, especially the Royal New Zealand Foundation for the Blind.

Military division

- Colonel Charles Desmond Hall ED – Colonels' List (Territorial Force), Headquarters Field Force Command, New Zealand Army.
- Group Captain Arthur Frederick Tucker DFC – Royal New Zealand Air Force.
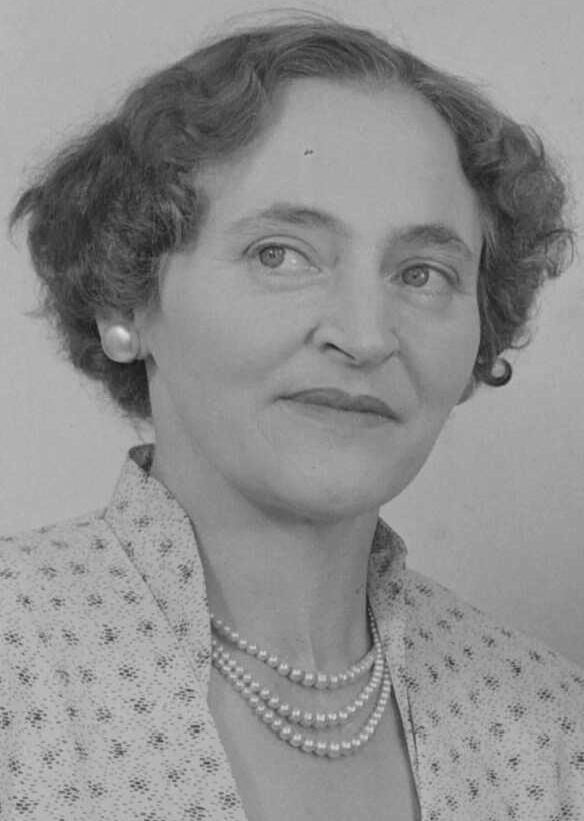
Iris Kitts

=== Member (MBE) ===
Civil division

- Arthur Walter Baker – detective chief inspector, New Zealand Police.
- Douglas William Robert Blackler – of Invercargill. For services to the community.
- Thelma Heath Clough – of Auckland. For services to commercial education.
- Gerald Huntly Corrick JP – of Feilding. For services to local government and community.
- Dorothy Ida Davies (Mrs Lochore) JP – of Whangaparāoa. For services to music.
- Gar Leong Ding JP – of Momona. For services to commercial horticulture and community.
- Jessie Edna Donald JP – of Lower Hutt. For services to the community.
- The Reverend Wilfred Ernest Falkingham – of Christchurch. For services to social welfare.
- Arthur Stanley Fong – of Greymouth. For services to sport and community.
- George Joseph Kennedy Keown – of Wellington; Assistant Secretary of Mines, 1961–1975.
- Margaret Alexandrina Mackenzie – of Dunedin. For services to sport, especially netball.
- John Alexander McInnes – of Christchurch. For services to sport, especially wrestling.
- Wairemana Miriama Hohipera Pitama-Riwai – of Christchurch. For services to Māori culture.
- Constance Miriam Purdue – of Auckland. For community and public services.
- Richard James Rolfe – of Thames. For services as president of the New Zealand Trotting Conference, 1969–1974.
- Charles Edward Saunders JP – of Blenheim. For services to rowing and the community.
- Professor Keith Westhead Thomson – of Palmerston North; professor of geography, Massey University. For services to the arts, education and community.
- Cissie Winstanley – of Napier. For services to bowling.

Military division

- Warrant Officer Physical Training Instructor Peter Joseph Allan – Royal New Zealand Navy.
- Temporary Major and Quartermaster Walter Fraser – Royal New Zealand Army Service Corps.
- Major Neville Sutcliffe Kidd – Royal New Zealand Infantry Regiment (Regular Force).
- Warrant Officer Second Class Richard Lindsay Pepper – Royal New Zealand Armoured Corps.
- Warrant Officer Second Class Ian Mac Stevenson ED – Royal New Zealand Army Ordnance Corps (Territorial Force).
- Temporary Squadron Leader Terence John Kelly – Royal New Zealand Air Force.
- Flight Lieutenant Edward George Wright – Royal New Zealand Air Force.
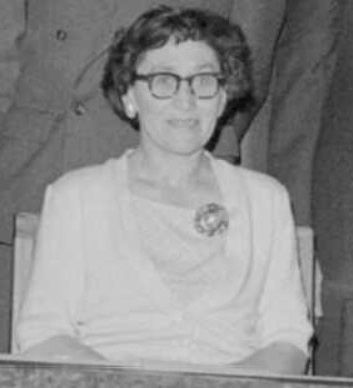
Jessie Donald

== British Empire Medal (BEM) ==
Civil division

- Russell Harris Broughton – of Masterton. For services to the community.
- Robert Laurie Butler – detective senior sergeant, New Zealand Police.
- William Peter Dawson JP – of Dunedin. For services to the community.
- Keith Owen Evans – senior sergeant, New Zealand Police.
- Athol Charles Garlick – of Rotorua. For services to sport.
- Rebecca Annie Graham – of Whangaparāoa. For services to the community.
- Frederick Lionel Graham Howard – of Taihape. For services to the community.
- Wilfrid Christian Kohn – of Gisborne. For services to music.
- Ernest James Arthur Ormrod – of New Plymouth. For services to brass bands.
- John Hamilton Shortt – of Palmerston North. For services to the blind.
- Mary Gabrielle Smith – of Auckland. For services to the handicapped.
- Celia May Wilkins – of Pukerua Bay. For services to sport, especially women's hockey.

Military division

- General Dutyman Harry Robert Willis – Royal New Zealand Navy.
- Sergeant Allan John Brown – Royal New Zealand Engineers.
- Flight Sergeant William Leslie Grimes – Royal New Zealand Air Force.
- Flight Sergeant Eric James Taylor – Royal New Zealand Air Force.

== Companion of the Queen's Service Order (QSO) ==
=== For community service ===
- Alison Gray Cathie – of Wellington. For services to nursing and the community.
- John Nesham Gordon – of Wellington. For welfare services.
- Hensleigh Carthew Marryat Norris – of Hamilton. For services to the community.
- Leonard Gordon Keith Steven JP – of Christchurch. For services to the community, especially the Crippled Children's Society.

=== For public services ===
- The Honourable Raymond Boord – of Rotorua. For services to local government and community.
- Maida Jessie Clark JP – of Wellington. For services to education and the community.
- Mervyn Henry Janes – of Wellington. For services as a private secretary to ministers of the Crown.
- Makere Rangiatea Ralph Love JP – of Petone. For services to local-body affairs and the Māori people.
- David Gilmour McLachlan JP – of Wellington. For services to medicine, in particular psychiatry.
- James Lister Newman – of Auckland. For services to the care of geriatrics.
- Alfred Raymond Perry – of Wellington; lately deputy Secretary of Labour.
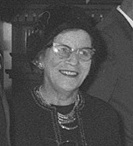
Maida Clark

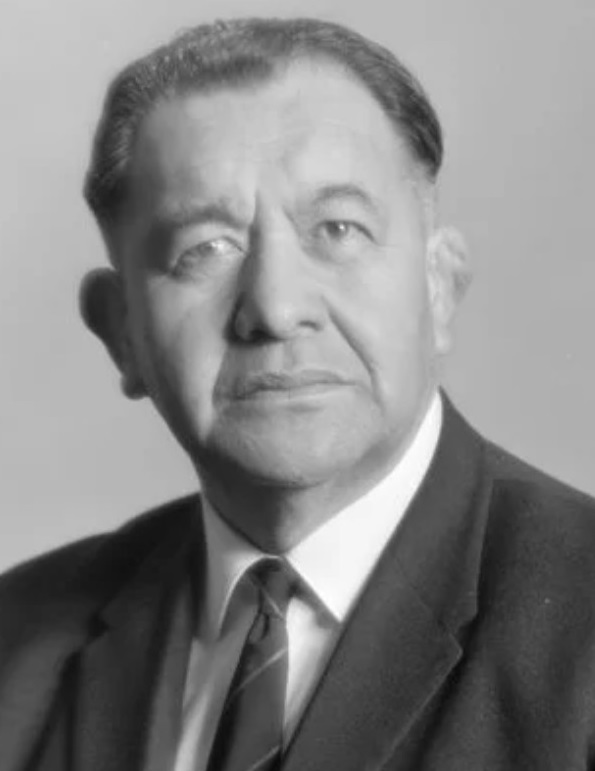
Ralph Love

== Queen's Service Medal (QSM) ==
=== For community service ===
- Robert Wilfred Allum JP – of Wellington. For services to the community.
- Frederick Walter Whitney Dawson – of Whangārei. For services to the community.
- Beatrice Mary Freeling – of Auckland. For services to the community.
- Phyllis Maude Hewstone – of Christchurch. For services to the community.
- Arthur Oliver Kempton – of Invercargill. For service to technical education.
- Ivy Clarissa Laidlaw – of Dunedin. For services to the community, in particular the Otago Old People's Welfare Council.
- Gwendoline Myrtle Audrey Le Verne – of Auckland. For welfare services.
- Marie Elizabeth Markwick – of Whangārei. For voluntary services to the community.
- Reitu Mary Robson – of Henderson. For welfare services.
- Thomas Romain – of Wellington. For welfare work.
- Andrew George Ross JP – of Hastings. For services to the Intellectually Handicapped Children's Society.
- Norman George Stewart – of Dunedin. For services to disabled people.
- Lieutenant-Colonel Thomas Craig Wallace JP RNZAC (Rtd.) – of Cambridge. For services to the community and returned servicemen.
- Herbert Walter Watson – of Renwick. For services to the community.
- Ellis John Wood ED – of Ashburton. For services to the Boy Scout Association of New Zealand.

=== For public services ===
- Joyce Una Baker – of Ashhurst. For services to nursing.
- Adelaide Booth JP – of Lower Hutt. For services to education.
- William George Caldwell – of Balclutha. For services to local-body affairs and community.
- John Francis Colvin JP – of Te Atatū South. For service to local government and community.
- Keith Hall Eddy JP – of Wainuiomata. For services to local-body affairs and community.
- Arthur Huia Honeyfield – of Katikati. For public services.
- Geoffrey Noel Jeffery JP – of Roxburgh. For services to local government.
- Norman Philip Hastings Jones – of Invercargill. For services to civil defence and the community.
- Mary Rose Kinney – of Alexandra; postmistress at Chatto Creek, 1933–1975.
- Frederick Charles McGehan JP – of Auckland. For services to local government and the community.
- Albert Edward Surtees Roberts – of Te Kaha. For services to local-body affairs and community.
- John Robert Scurr – of Wānaka. For services to local government.
- Claude Henry Shackell – of Timaru. For services to civil defence and the community.
- James Melville Stanley JP – of Taupō. For services to local-body affairs.
- William Douglas Sullivan – of Lower Hutt; lately assistant director (management accounts), New Zealand Railways
- Violet May Tew – of Timaru. For services to nursing.
- Jean Evelyn Woodham JP – of Christchurch. For services to local-body affairs and community.

== Queen's Fire Service Medal (QFSM) ==
- David William Blewett – chief fire officer Alexandra Volunteer Fire Brigade.
- Bruce McKenzie Wallis – chief fire officer, Gore Volunteer Fire Brigade.

== Queen's Police Medal (QPM) ==
- Henry John Forsey – lately constable, New Zealand Police.

== Air Force Cross (AFC) ==
- Squadron Leader Noel James Stewart Rodger – Royal New Zealand Air Force.

== Queen's Commendation for Valuable Service in the Air ==
- Flight Lieutenant Barry James Mitchell – Royal New Zealand Air Force.
