= William Donald =

William Donald may refer to:

- Willie Donald (1953–2022), Scottish cricketer and administrator
- Bill Donald (1899–1987), Australian rules footballer
- William Henry Donald (1875–1946), Australian journalist
- William Donald (doctor) (1816–1884), British-born New Zealand physician
