= Alastair Watson =

Alastair Watson is the name of:

- Alastair Watson (soldier) (born 1953), Private Secretary to Prince Andrew, Duke of York
- Alastair MacDonald Watson (1909–1987), English cricketer
