= Holy Trinity Church, Pakaraka =

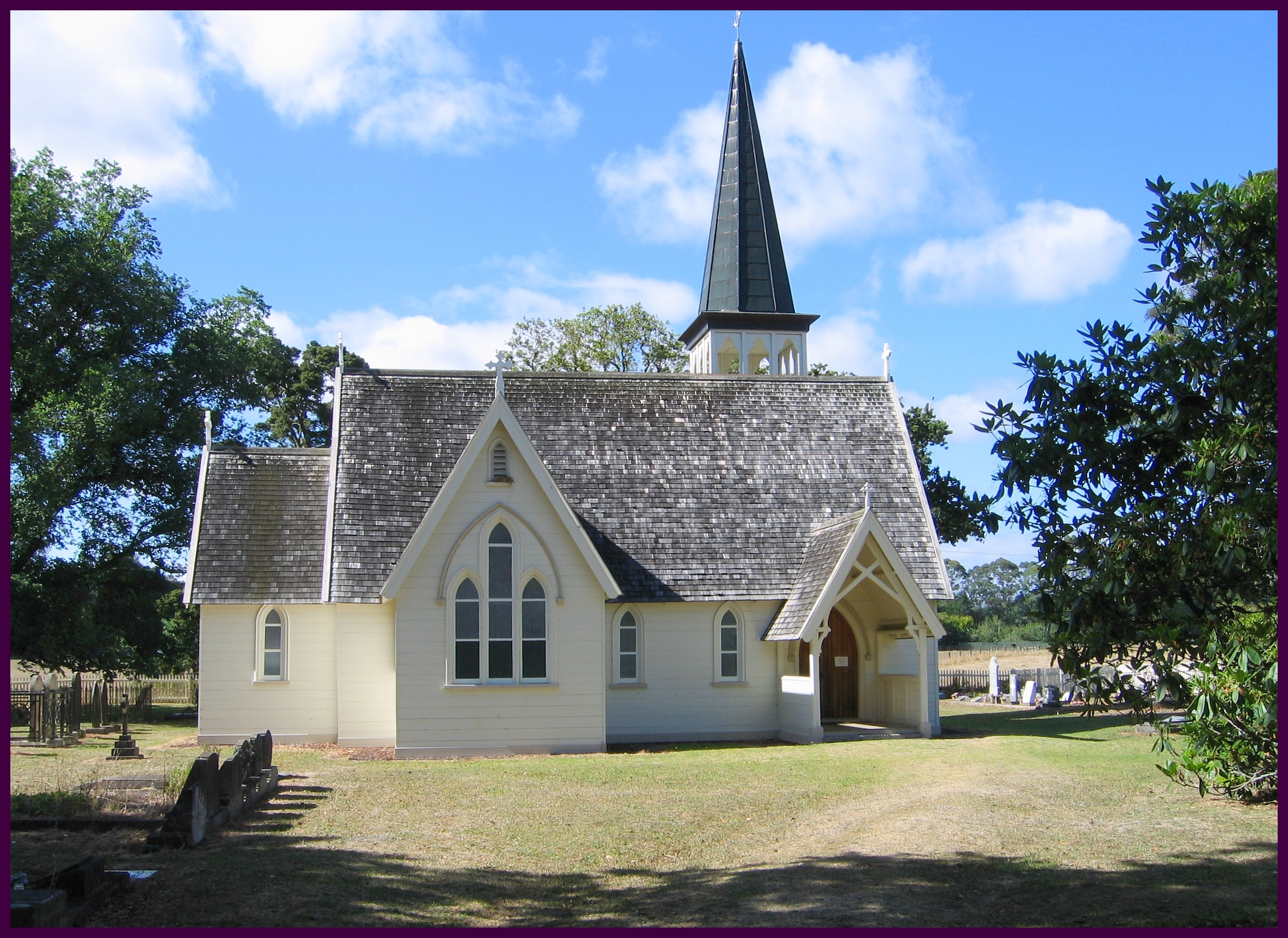
- Holy Trinity Church, Pakaraka
- 35°21′38.83″S 173°57′2.06″E
- Location: 6885 State Highway 1, Pakaraka
- Country: New Zealand
- Denomination: Anglican

Architecture
- Functional status: Active
- Architect: Marsden Clarke or Richard Keals
- Architectural type: Church
- Style: Gothic Revival
- Years built: 1873

Administration
- Diocese: Auckland
- Parish: Waimate North Parish

Heritage New Zealand – Category 1
- Official name: Holy Trinity Church (Anglican)
- Designated: 22 November 1984
- Reference no.: 65

Holy Trinity Church is a heritage-listed Anglican church and associated churchyard at Pakaraka, in the Northland region of New Zealand. Built in 1873 in the Gothic Revival style, the building has a strong connection with the prominent missionary Henry Williams. The church was registered by the New Zealand Historic Places Trust as a Historic Place Category I in 1984.

== Background ==
In 1823, the Church Missionary Society (CMS) sent Henry Williams, accompanied by his wife and three children, to the Bay of Islands in New Zealand to take charge of its mission there. Based at Paihia for the next several years, he worked towards spreading Christianity among the local Māori people. He was also the translator of the Treaty of Waitangi and encouraged the Māori chiefs to sign it. In the 1830s Williams purchased land at Pakaraka, with the intention of providing income for himself and his family in the future. His purchase of this land became a matter of controversy and eventually he was dismissed from service with the CMS.

Despite not being employed by the CMS, Williams was still a priest. Moving to Pakaraka, where his sons already farmed, he built a church there in the period 1850–1851, and his house was built nearby in 1852. He continued to preach and by 1854 he had restored his relationship with the CMS to the point where he resumed work with the organisation. Williams's reputation was such that he had a sizeable Māori congregation which soon outgrew the capacity of his church at Pakaraka. He died in 1867.

== History ==
In 1873, Williams's sons organised the construction of a new church to commemorate their father. This was the Holy Trinity Church, built on the site of the original church at Pakaraka. The construction of the new building and its bell tower, which used locally sourced timber, cost close to £1,000 in the currency of the time. When originally built, the tower contained a vestry at its base. However, this was relocated to the northern transept when the tower was destroyed in a gale in 1946. The tower was eventually rebuilt in 2001.

The first Bishop of Auckland, William Cowie, opened the church in November 1873 in front of a crowd of several hundred people. It took the name of the previous church on the site, the namesake of which was Trinity Sunday, the day on which Williams had been ordained as an archdeacon. The church is still in use as part of the Waimate North Parish of the Anglican Diocese of Auckland.

== Design ==
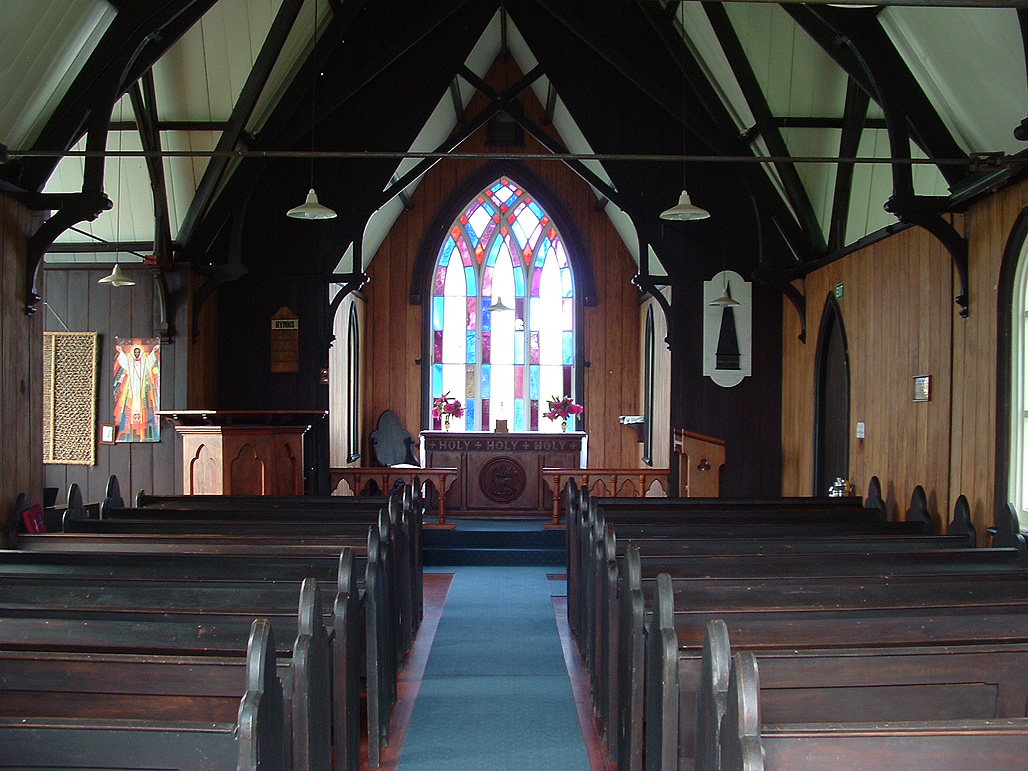
Interior of Holy Trinity Church looking towards the chancel

The design of Holy Trinity Church is credited to either Marsden Clarke, the son of a CMS missionary, or Auckland-based architect Richard Keals. Heritage architect John Stacpoole more definitively states Keals was the architect. Executed in a Gothic Revival style, the church has a cruciform floor plan, the longitudinal dimension of which is generally orientated along a west-east axis. A porch is provided on the northern side with the bell tower and spire on the opposing south side. Once completed, the church was a dominant feature of the Pakaraka landscape, the surrounding terrain planted with pasture grass and trees for a traditional English appearance. The old church building was relocated to serve as living quarters for visitors to the locality. It is likely that the east window of the new building was originally used in the older church.

== Legacy ==
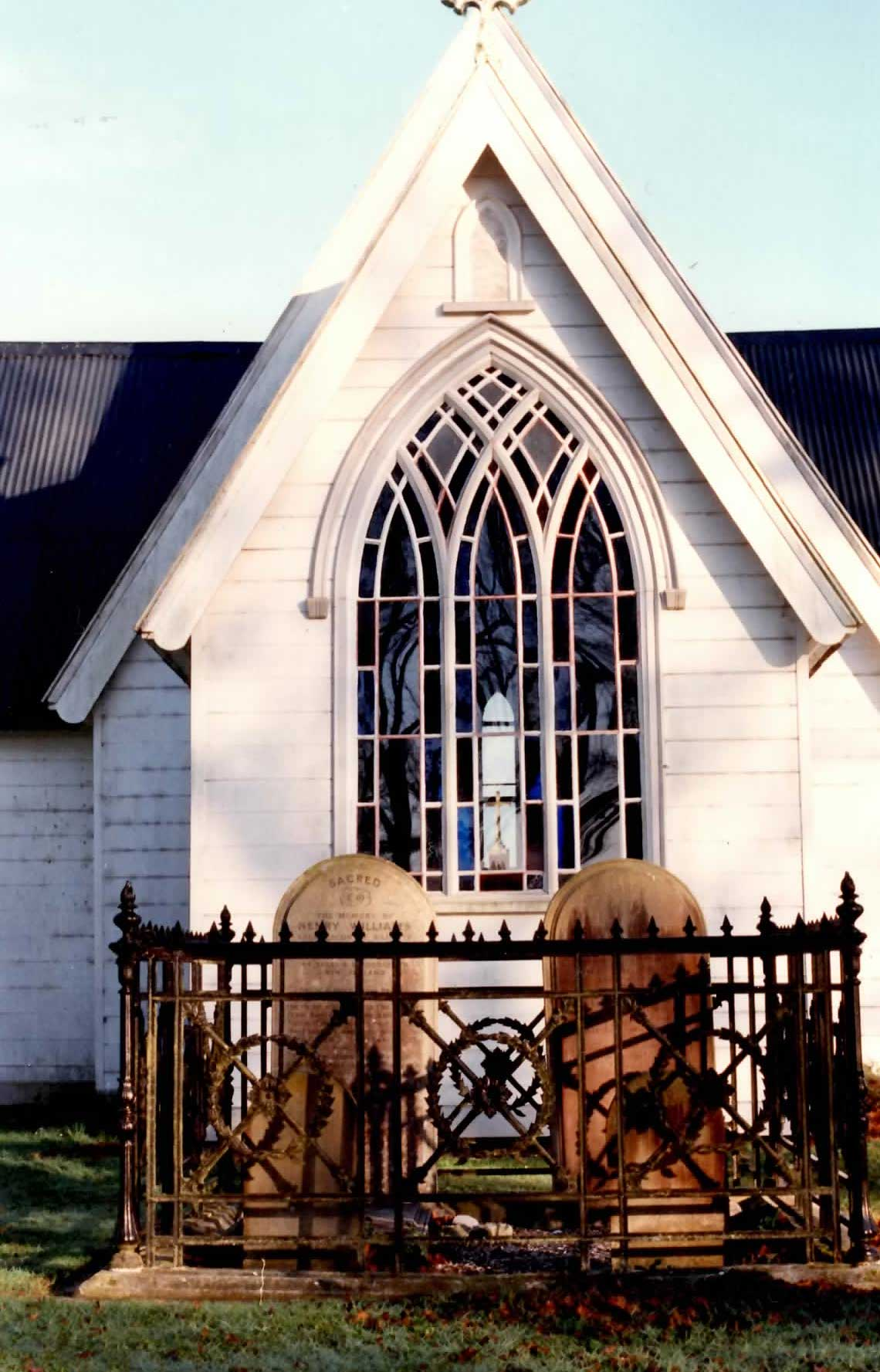
The graves of Henry Williams and his wife are in the front of the main window of the church

Located on State Highway 1, Holy Trinity Church was listed by the New Zealand Historic Places Trust, now Heritage New Zealand, as a Historic Place Category 1 on 22 November 1984. It is surrounded by a cemetery containing the graves of many prominent early European settlers as well as Māori residents. Among them are Williams and his wife, their graves positioned close to the chancel end of the building. Also within the cemetery is a grave of a soldier of the New Zealand (Māori) Pioneer Battalion that served in the First World War; this is maintained by the Commonwealth War Graves Commission.

The former Williams residence, known as The Retreat, at Pakaraka is across the road from Holy Trinity Church, and is also a heritage listed property. An avenue of trees connected the respective properties although few of these remain.
