= Fred Miller (New Zealand journalist) =

New Zealand historian, poet (1904–1996)

Frederick Walter Gascoyne Miller OBE (19 September 1904 – 12 October 1996) was a notable New Zealand journalist, goldminer, historian, poet and community worker. He was born in Hastings, New Zealand, on 19 September 1904.

In the 1975 Queen's Birthday Honours, Miller was appointed an Officer of the Order of the British Empire, for services to the community and literature. He was New Zealand's longest-serving journalist, having had a career in that industry for 74 years. He also served 24 years on the Invercargill Licensing Trust board.

He died in Invercargill on 12 October 1996, his wife following 20 months later. They are buried in Invercargill's Eastern Cemetery.
