= Car Norris =

Hensleigh Carthew Marryat "Car" Norris QSO (12 March 1893 – 3 September 1980) was a New Zealand lawyer, soldier, Anglican layman and historian.

Norris had a variety of interests and was awarded life membership by various organisations. Two of his books, Armed settlers (1956) and Settlers in depression (1964), are regarded as standard histories for Hamilton covering the period 1864 to 1894.

In the 1975 Queen's Birthday Honours, Norris was appointed a Companion of the Queen's Service Order for community service.
