= Cyril White (advocate) =

Cyril Charles William White OBE (7 September 1909 – 5 July 1984) was a New Zealand piano tuner and repairer, advocate and worker for the blind. He was born in Hastings, New Zealand, in 1909.

In the 1975 Queen's Birthday Honours, White was appointed an Officer of the Order of the British Empire, for services to the blind, especially the Royal New Zealand Foundation for the Blind.
