= Frank Holmes (economist) =

New Zealand economist and government advisor (1924–2011)

Sir Frank Holmes JP
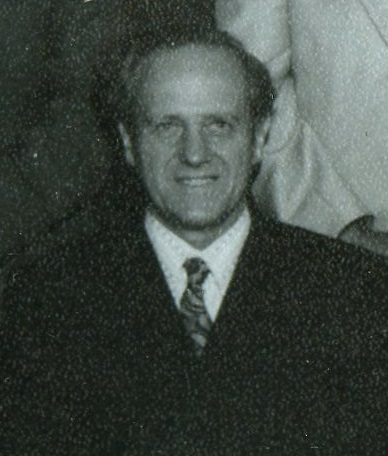
- Holmes in 1977
- Born: Frank Wakefield Holmes; 8 September 1924; Oamaru, New Zealand
- Died: 23 October 2011 (aged 87); Silverstream, New Zealand
- Occupations: Economist; public servant
- Spouse: Nola Ruth Ross (m. 1947; died 2011)

Sir Frank Wakefield Holmes JP (8 September 1924 – 23 October 2011) was a New Zealand economist and government advisor noted to have significantly influenced New Zealand's social and economic development.

== Career and military service ==
Throughout his career, Holmes advised on economic policy and foreign trade to several New Zealand governments during the 1950s and 1960s.

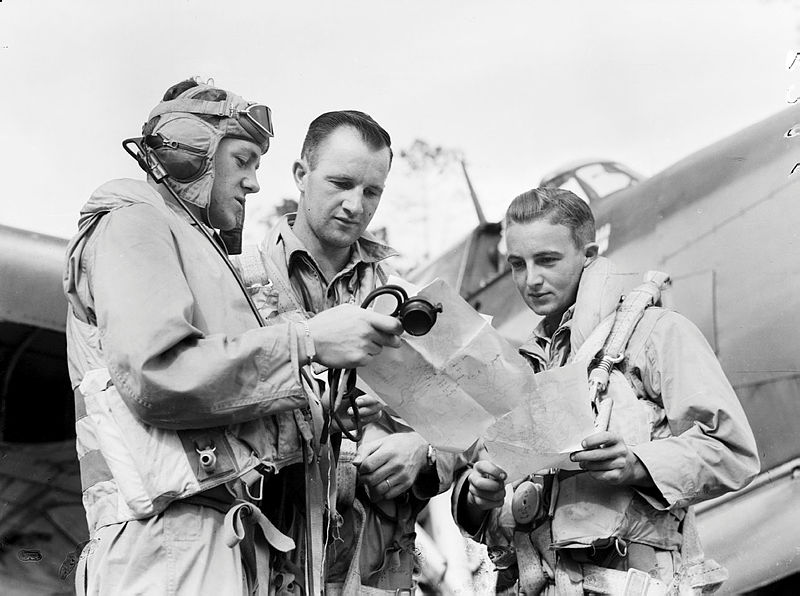
Group of No. 30 Squadron aircrew. Frank Wakefield Holmes pictured in the middle, 1944.

Holmes was an economics professor at Victoria University of Wellington from 1952 to 1967. He then remained Emeritus Professor of the Institute of Policy Studies up until his death.

Holmes served as a bomber pilot in World War II with the Royal New Zealand Air Force, No. 31 Squadron.

He was appointed a Knight Bachelor in the 1975 Queen's Birthday Honours, for services to economics and education and was also awarded, by the University of Otago in 1997, an Honorary Doctorate and in 2004, from the Victoria University of Wellington.

Holmes died on 23 October 2011, aged 87. He had been predeceased by his wife, Nola, Lady Holmes, in March that year, after 63 years of marriage.
