= Mark Peachey =

Australian cricketer

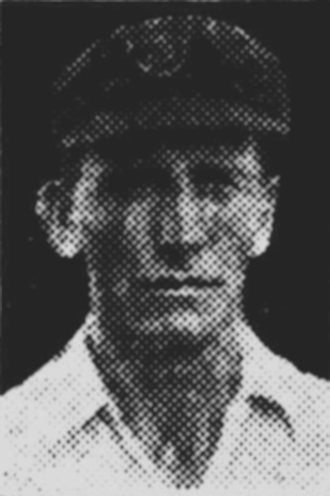

Personal information
- Born: 31 October 1900; Tannymorel, Queensland, Australia
- Died: 23 November 1987 (aged 87); Ipswich, Queensland, Australia
- Source: Cricinfo, 6 October 2020

Mark Peachey (31 October 1900 – 23 November 1987) was an Australian cricketer. He played in one first-class match for Queensland in 1928/29.

== See also ==
- List of Queensland first-class cricketers
