= Bill Beath =

Australian cricketer

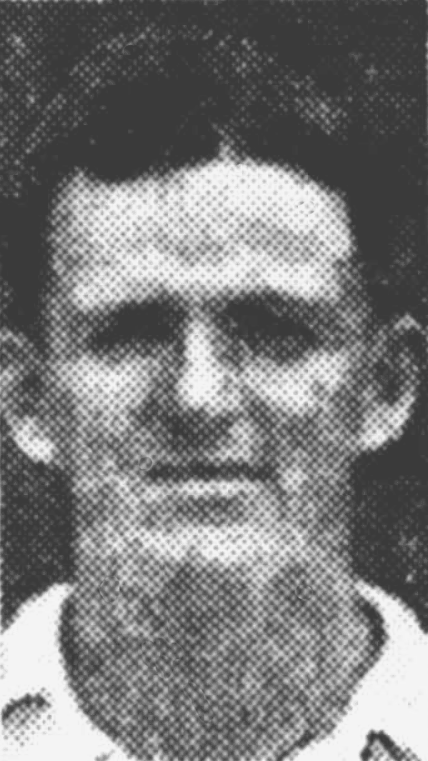

Personal information
- Full name: Neville Ray James Beath
- Born: 12 November 1921; Parkes, New South Wales, Australia
- Died: 22 November 1987 (aged 66); Richmond, New South Wales, Australia
- Source: ESPNcricinfo, 22 December 2016

Bill Beath (12 November 1921 – 22 November 1987) was an Australian cricketer. He played seven first-class matches for New South Wales between 1946/47 and 1947/48. Truth praised his bowling.

== See also ==
- List of New South Wales representative cricketers
