= Jayatirtha Dasa =

Guru of ISKCON

Jayatirtha Das (IAST: Jayatīrtha dāsa) (Note: formerly Jayatirtha Goswami Jayatīrtha Gosvāmī, and also known as Tirthapada, Bhakti Vijaya Tirtha and Vijaya Acharya) (born James Edward Immel; November 13, 1948, – November 13, 1987), was one of the leading disciples of A. C. Bhaktivedanta Swami Prabhupada and a guru within the International Society for Krishna Consciousness (commonly known as 'the Hare Krishnas' or ISKCON). Jayatirtha was appointed a life trustee of the Bhaktivedanta Book Trust by his guru, Prabhupada, who also placed him in the managerial post of the fledgling Spiritual Sky company. Under Jayatirtha's able management the company became a multimillion-dollar concern and the Wall Street Journal covered the company's success with a front-page article.

== Early years ==
Jayatirtha Dasa was born as James Edward Immel in Saipan, US Trust Territory of the Pacific. He was a business and philosophy major in college. In 1969, James was initiated into the Gaudiya Vaishnava tradition by A. C. Bhaktivedanta Swami Prabhupada, whereupon he was given the name Jayatirtha Dasa. In the beginning of the 1970s he served as a president of the Los Angeles ISKCON temple and as a president of Spiritual Sky Enterprises, a group of family-style businesses founded by ISKCON. At the time, Spiritual Sky was the largest incense manufacturer in the US, and the only legitimate business of the society.

== ISKCON GBC member and initiating guru ==
Jayatirtha later went on to become a senior leader and preacher within the movement, a member of its management body known as the Governing Body Commission, and the head of ISKCON in Europe. In 1975, Jayatirtha was sent by Prabhupada "to take over and organise" the Hare Krishna movement in Great Britain. Jayatirtha resided with his family at Bhaktivedanta Manor, a beautiful manor house donated by George Harrison to ISKCON. He travelled extensively throughout the world under the direction of Swami Prapupada and performed the Vedic ritual of Pratista (deity installation ) in numerous temples. He was commended by Swami Prabhupada for his refined abilities in arcana padati (the process of deity worship) which set the standard of deity worship throughout the society. He co-compiled a handbook under Swami Prabhupada's direction to assist all authorized students in that process. He was also chief editor of The Maha Bharat Times; a news paper which highlighted the concerns of the Hindu community of Great Britain.

The last place Swami Prabhupada visited in the western hemisphere before his departure was Bhaktivedanta Manor, where he embraced Jayatirtha saying "your name is Tirtha I have come to take shelter of you," before returning to Vrindavan in India to take Samadhi (die). Jayatirtha was the only member of the G.B.C. who did not follow Swami Prabhupada back to India to witness their Guru's departure.

In the aftermath of Swami Prabhupada's death, Jayatirtha was one of eleven disciples selected to become an initiating guru. He was located in London and was responsible for initiating disciples and managing ISKCON in Great Britain and South Africa. Due to his capabilities and organizational power, the Hare Krishna movement has significantly expanded and developed in those countries.

In December 1980, Jayatirtha bought Croome Court, an estate in Worcestershire 25 miles (40 km) south of Birmingham. He renamed it Chaitanya College, looking to introduce an ISKCON college degree in the Vaishnava tradition. The estate included a two-hundred-room mansion, a chapel and various outbuildings. It was built in 1750 for the Earl of Coventry by Lancelot "Capability" Brown. The design of the interiors was made by Robert Adam. The property included 40 acres (160,000 m^{2}) of fields and landscaped parkland. During the World War II, the place served as a residence for Queen of the Netherlands. Jayatirtha spent hundreds of thousands of pounds restoring the property and turning the chapel into the Hare Krishna temple.

Jayatirtha frequently lectured about the divine love of Radha and Krishna. He had been holding long kirtan sessions, which were considered by other GBC members to be interfering with the street collections and accumulation of funds by the society members. His concentrated focus on spiritual practices were in some respects a cause for concern. Jayatirtha always maintained that a divine flow of spiritual energy descended upon him at that time and refuted the allegations that his deep meditations were the result of taking LSD. The meditations which he entered into during kirtan (congregational chanting) sessions were conducted with composure, often with his eyes closed, whilst sitting crossed legged and with a straight back.

Jayatirtha's responsibilities within ISKCON required him to make regular visits to Africa, India, U.S.A and other countries although he resided with his family in the U.K. His influence in South Africa was one of the major contributing factors to reversing the trend of Hindu conversions to Islam. During his visits to India, in his free time, he would travel to remote holy places for meditation.

The Governing Body Commission suspected that Jayatirtha's meditations or so called ecstasies were the symptoms of drug use. Jayatirtha became "the topic of serious conversations among GBC members". During a GBC meeting in Los Angeles (called to deal with problems of another Hare Krishna guru, Hansadutta Swami) Jayatirtha was relieved from all his responsibilities in ISKCON for one year and required to renounce his wife and take sannyasa. The sannyasa initiation ceremony took place in LA Hare Krishna temple and was conducted by Kirtanananda Swami. Although Jayathirtha begged and pleaded with the GBC not to enforce the sannyasa order upon him, especially as he had not consulted with his family members, his pleading fell on deaf ears.

GBC members hoped that taking sannyasa would help Jayatirtha to overcome the problems in spiritual life, but Jayatirtha was unhappy in ISKCON after that. He started to "shift his loyalty away from ISKCON leadership to Shridhara Swami", a godbrother of A. C. Bhaktivedanta Swami Prabhupada, who lived in West Bengal. At the spring 1982 GBC annual meeting in Mayapur, Jayatirtha was told, that if he did not stop seeing Shridhara Swami, he would be removed from his leadership post in ISKCON. In response, Jayatirtha walked off the ISKCON Mayapur property taking nothing with him and took refuge in the Gaudiya Math ashram of Shridhara Swami. Shridhara Swami, being a senior Gaudiya Vashnava leader, was concerned about the growing tension in ISKCON. He tried to mediate various problems, but usually only drew fire on himself as a result. Many of Prabhupada's disciples, disillusioned with the existing "zonal guru system" in ISKCON at the time left the organization and turned to Shridhara Swami and Gaudiya Math in search of spiritual renewal. Consequently, the GBC considered Shridhara Swami a threat, especially when such senior ISKCON members as Jayatirtha took his side.

== Withdrawal from ISKCON ==
At the 1982 meeting, the GBC (Governing Body Commission) instructed Jayatirtha Maharaja that he must forgo any contact with Sridhara Maharaja or else leave ISKCON, otherwise he would be condemned for "failing to cooperate with the ISKCON movement". To stabilize Jayatirtha's zone, the GBC turned it to another guru, Bhagavan, who reinitiated some of Jayatirtha's disciples. Under Bhagavan's leadership, Hare Krishna devotees in UK went on a year-long marathon to collect funds to save British ISKCON properties. Unable to pay high mortgage payments, Bhagavan eventually had to sell Croome Court estate. ISKCON in the absence of jayatirtha's managerial skills was becoming unviable. Some of Jayatirtha's disciples fled from London to India and joined their guru, creating "the first formal schismatic offshoot from ISKCON". Jayatirtha's new splinter group became based in London and he renamed his former ISKCON disciples with biblical names. Finally, he left his London temple and went to Nepal with a small group of students and founded The Order of Pilgrims which later became established in South Africa.

== Literature and philosophies ==
A booklet "Notes of a Pilgrim" written by Jayatirtha shortly after his departure from ISKCON, highlights his personal experience and reflections of the society and its leaders. He translated the Bhagavad Gita from Sanskrit to English, "Bhagavad Gita: The Eternal Song Goes On". Jayatirtha was an admirer of Mahatma Gandhi and wrote articles and gave discourses on the Gandhian principles of ahimsa and satyagraha. He was the founder of the concept for the Gandhian Organisation for Peace and Liberty (GOPAL TRUST) a registered charity currently running projects in Jagannath Puri, Bay of Bengal, India. He purchased a large plot of land in Puri in conjunction with H. Desai, a Gandhian freedom fighter, for the purpose of establishing a Gandhian ashram there.

== Death ==
On November 13, 1987, five years after Jayatirtna had left ISKCON, he was killed by his disciple John Tiernan. Tiernan was not tried for murder and pleaded guilty to manslaughter on grounds of diminished responsibility. A proposal by associate editor Nori Muster to publish his obituary in ISKCON World Review was denied by Executive Editor Mukunda Goswami, in spite of the fact that Jayatirtha was one of the senior members of ISKCON and an early supporter of ISKCON World Review.
