= Ken Rosewarne =

Australian rules footballer (1911–1987)

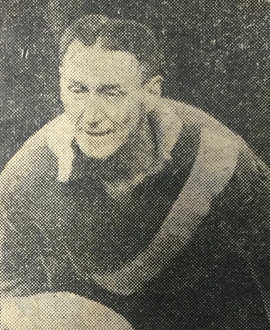
- Rosewarne in 1932

Personal information
- Full name: Kenneth Raymond Rosewarne
- Born: 11 November 1911; Eaglehawk, Victoria
- Died: 22 November 1987 (aged 76); Southport, Queensland
- Original team: Ivanhoe
- Height: 179 cm (5 ft 10 in)
- Weight: 79 kg (174 lb)

Playing career^{1}
Years	Club	Games (Goals)
1932	Collingwood	2 (2)
- ^{1} Playing statistics correct to the end of 1932.

Kenneth Raymond Rosewarne (11 November 1911 – 22 November 1987) was an Australian rules footballer who played with Collingwood in the Victorian Football League (VFL).

Rosewarne played five first eleven matches of Victorian District Cricket with the Colts Cricket Club in 1929/30.
