= Bertie Watson =

Australian cricketer

Personal information
- Born: 13 March 1898; Maclean, New South Wales, Australia
- Died: 18 November 1987 (aged 89); Canberra, Australia
- Source: ESPNcricinfo, 5 February 2017

Bertie Watson (13 March 1898 – 18 November 1987) was an Australian cricketer. He played two first-class matches for New South Wales in 1927/28. He also played for Gordon.

== See also ==
- List of New South Wales representative cricketers
