= Christopher Wilmarth =

American sculptor

- Born: Christopher Mallory Wilmarth; June 11, 1943; Sonoma, California, U.S.
- Died: November 18, 1987 (aged 44); Red Hook, Brooklyn, New York, U.S.
- Education: Cooper Union (BFA)

Christopher Wilmarth (1943 – November 19, 1987) was an American artist, known for producing sculptures using primarily glass and steel.

== Early life ==
Christopher Wilmarth was born on June 11, 1943, in Sonoma, California. He was raised in Sonoma County and Palo Alto, California, before moving to New York City in the 1960s. He earned a B.F.A. from Cooper Union in 1966.

== Career ==
Wilmarth was a professor of sculpture at Cooper Union and Columbia University. Wilmarth arrived at glass as his preferred medium after moving to New York City, influenced by other minimalists, such as Donald Judd and Carl Andre, and the city scape. As a material, glass was capable of capturing, reflecting, and refracting light to illusory and emotional effect. His artistic practise was influenced by poetry and music, which can be seen through his choice of titles, as well as Romanticism and Modernists such as Henri Matisse and Constantin Brancusi.

In 1973, Wilmarth began a series of sculptures titled Nine Clearings for a Standing Man. Each work consisted of a sheet of subtly bent steel behind a sheet of etched glass.

In 1978, Wilmarth abandoned art dealer representation and established The Studio of the First Amendment, where he hosted his own exhibitions independently.

== Death ==
On November 19, 1987, Wilmarth was found dead of an apparent suicide at his home in Red Hook, Brooklyn. He was 44.

In 2001, Wilmarth's wife, Susan Wilmarth-Rabineau, donated her late husband's archive of work to the Harvard Art Museums.

== Exhibitions ==
=== Solo Exhibitions ===
- Christopher Wilmarth: Matrix 29, Wadsworth Atheneum, Hartford, CT, 1977
- Christopher Wilmarth: Sculpture and Drawings, Grey Art Gallery and Study Center, New York University, New York, NY, 1978
- Christopher Wilmarth, Seattle Art Museum, Seattle, WA, 1979
- Christopher Wilmarth: Breath, The Studio for the First Amendment, New York, NY (exhibition traveled to the Institute of Contemporary Art, Boston, MA; Berkeley Art Museum and Pacific Film Archive, University of California, Berkeley, CA; University Art Museum, Santa Barbara, CA), 1982
- Christopher Wilmarth: Layers, Works from 1961-1984, Hirshl & Adler Modern, New York, NY, 1984
- Christopher Wilmarth/Days on Blue 1977, Neuberger Museum, Purchase College, State University of New York, Purchase, NY, 1989
- Christopher Wilmarth, Hirschl & Adler Modern, New York, NY, 1989
- Christopher Wilmarth, Museum of Modern Art, New York, NY, 1989
- Christopher Wilmarth, DIA Center for the Arts, Bridgehampton, NY, 1994
- Christopher Wilmarth: Sculpture and Painting from the 1960s and 1980s, Sidney Janis Gallery, New York, NY, 1997
- Christopher Wilmarth, Arts of Club of Chicago, Chicago, IL, 2001
- Christopher Wilmarth: Living Inside, University Gallery, University of Massachusetts, Amherst, Amherst, MA, 2001
- Christopher Wilmarth: Drawing into Sculpture, Fogg Art Museum, Harvard University, Cambridge, MA, 2003
- Reverie: Christopher Wilmarth, Before and After Mallarmé, Fogg Art Museum, Harvard University, Cambridge, MA, May 20–August 13, 2017
- Christopher Wilmarth, Betty Cuningham Gallery, New York, NY, September 6-October 29, 2017

=== Group Exhibitions ===
- Cool Art - 1967, The Aldrich Contemporary Art Museum, Ridgefield, CT, 1968
- Three Sculptors: Chris Wilmarth, John duff, Peter Charles, The Corcoran Gallery of Art, Washington, DC, 1987
- Sculpture Since the Sixties, Whitney Museum of American Art at Equitable Center, New York, NY, 1998
- The Transparent Thread: Asian Philosophy in Recent American Art, Hofstra Museum, Hofstra University, Hampstead, NY, 1990
- Contemporary Drawing: Existence, Passage and the Dream, Rose Art Museum, Brandeis University, Waltham, MA, 1991
- In a Classical Vein: Work from the Collection, Whitney Museum of American Art, New York, NY, 1994
- Matrix is 20!, Wadsworth Atheneum, Hartford, CT, 1995
- Minimalism: Its Aftermath and Affinities, Seattle Art Museum, Seattle, WA, 1996
- A Decade of Collecting: Selected Recent Acquisitions in Modern Drawing, The Museum of Modern Art, New York, NY, 1997
- Recent Glass Sculpture: A Union of Ideas, Milwaukee Art Museum, Milwaukee, MI, 1997
- Drawing Is Another Kind of Language: Recent American Drawings from a New York Private Collection, Arthur M. Sackler Museum, Cambridge, MA, 1997–1998
- DeNaturalized, Museum of Contemporary Art, Chicago, IL, 1998
- Edward R. Broida Collection: A Selection of Works Orlando Museum of Art, Orlando, FL, 1998
- Carved, Modeled, Assembled, Welded, Drawn: Sculptors’ Works in the Collection of the Albright-Knox, Albright-Knox Art Gallery, Buffalo, NY, 1999
- Surroundings; Responses to the American Landscape, Selections from The Permanent Collection of the Whitney Museum of American Art, San Jose Museum of Art, San Jose, CA, 2000
- Material Language: Small-Scale Sculpture after 1950, The Art Museum, Princeton University, Princeton, NJ, 2000
- Tina Turner, Christopher Wilmarth; In the Blue Blackness of My Sleep, Leonid Lerman, Rhapsody, Jennifer Bartlett from the Edward R. Broida Collection, Museum of Fine Arts, Houston, TX, 2000
- Minding Glass, Susquehanna Art Museum, Harrisburg, PA, 2000
- A Decade of Collecting: Recent Acquisitions of Prints and Drawings from 1940 to 2000, Fogg Art Museum, Harvard University Art Museum, Cambridge, MA, 2000
- Clement Greenberg: A Critic’s Collection, Portland Art Museum, OR, 2001
- About Objects, Museum of Art, Rhode Island School of Design, Providence, RI, 2001
- Against The Grain, Contemporary Art from the Edward R. Broida Collection, Museum of Modern Art, New York, NY, 2006
- Not New Work: Vincent Fecteau Selects from the Collection, San Francisco Museum of Modern Art, San Francisco, CA, 2009
- 1969, PS1 Contemporary Art Center, Long Island City, NY, 2009–2010
- Drawn/Taped/Burned: Abstraction on Paper, Katonah Museum of Art, Katonah, NY, 2011

== Public Collections ==
Wilmarth’s sculptures and works on paper are held in a number of significant public collections and have been the subject of museum projects and scholarly catalogues. The Harvard Art Museums, among other institutions, hold materials from his archive; museum catalogues and the record of gallery exhibitions offer the principal routes for research. For primary-source study, researchers should consult the holdings and catalogues published by major institutions that have mounted his work.

- Art Institute of Chicago, Chicago, IL
- Buffalo AKG Art Museum, Buffalo, NY
- Carnegie Museums of Pittsburgh, Pittsburg, PA
- Dallas Museum of Art, Dallas, TX
- Des Moines Art Center, Des Moines, IA
- Fogg Museum, Cambridge, MA
- Hirshhorn Museum and Sculpture Garden, Washington, DC
- Honolulu Museum of Art, Honolulu, HI
  Christopher Wilmarth, Clearing for a Standing Man No. 2, Honolulu Museum of Art
- Kemper Museum of Contemporary Art, Kansas City, MO
- Knoxville Museum of Art, Knoxville, TN
- Metropolitan Museum of Art, New York, NY
- Museum of Contemporary Art Chicago, Chicago, IL
- Museum of Fine Arts, Houston, Houston, TX
- Museum of Modern Art, New York, NY
- Nasher Sculpture Center, Dallas, TX
- National Gallery of Art, Washington, DC
- Philadelphia Museum of Art, Philadelphia, PA
- Saint Louis Art Museum, St. Louis, MO
- San Francisco Museum of Modern Art, San Francisco, CA
- The Tate Gallery, London, UK
- Wadsworth Atheneum, Hartford, CT
- Walker Art Center, Minneapolis, MN
- Whitney Museum of American Art, New York, NY
- Wichita Art Museum, Wichita, KS
