= Les Whitfield =

Australian rules footballer, born 1907

Personal information
- Full name: Les Whitfield
- Born: 8 November 1907
- Died: 6 November 1987 (aged 79)
- Original team: East Albury
- Height: 168 cm (5 ft 6 in)
- Weight: 66 kg (146 lb)

Playing career^{1}
Years	Club	Games (Goals)
1932	Essendon	1 (1)
- ^{1} Playing statistics correct to the end of 1932.

Les Whitfield (8 November 1907 – 6 November 1987) was an Australian rules footballer who played with Essendon in the Victorian Football League (VFL).
