= Jim Lundberg =

Australian rules footballer (1921–1987)

Personal information
- Full name: Norris James Lundberg
- Born: 19 June 1921; Northcote, Victoria
- Died: 30 November 1987 (aged 66); Bendigo, Victoria
- Original team: Seddon
- Height: 178 cm (5 ft 10 in)
- Weight: 64 kg (141 lb)

Playing career^{1}
Years	Club	Games (Goals)
1947	St Kilda	7 (0)
- ^{1} Playing statistics correct to the end of 1947.

Norris James Lundberg (19 June 1921 – 30 November 1987) was an Australian rules footballer who played with St Kilda in the Victorian Football League (VFL).
