= Bertie Ross =

New Zealand cricketer

Bertie Raymond Ross (1909 – 17 November 1987) was a New Zealand first-class cricketer who played two matches for Wellington.

Ross was born in Lower Hutt.
