= John Stacpoole =

New Zealand historian, architect (1919–2018)

John Stacpoole OBE
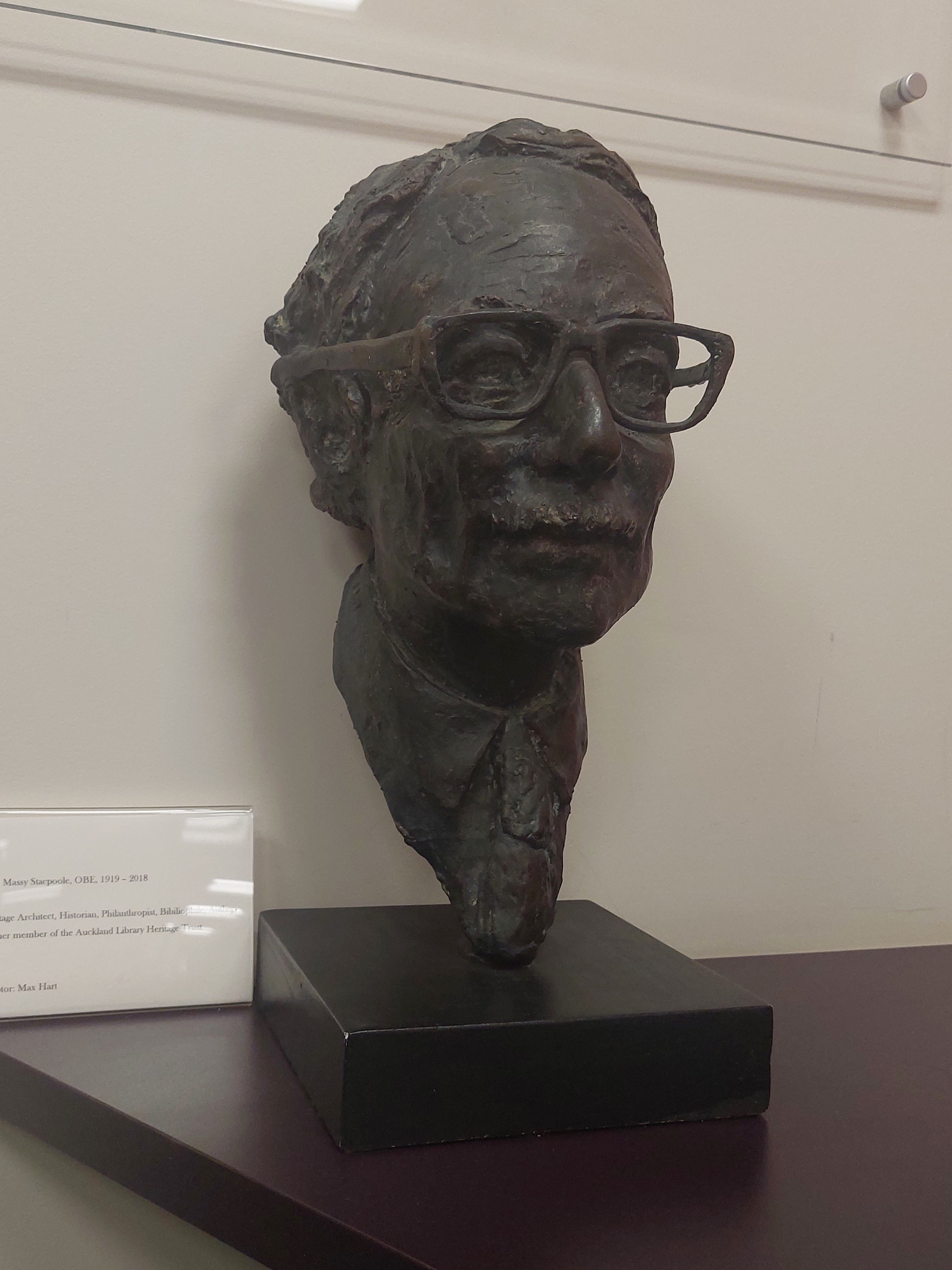
- Bust of John Stacpoole by Max Hart
- Born: John Massy Stacpoole; 30 September 1919; New Zealand
- Died: 5 September 2018 (aged 98); Auckland, New Zealand
- Education: Auckland University College
- Occupation: Architect
- Practice: Ministry of Works

John Massy Stacpoole OBE (30 September 1919 – 5 September 2018) was a New Zealand historian, heritage architect and bibliophile, who was responsible for the restoration of many historic buildings and wrote on colonial architecture and social history in New Zealand.

== Early life and family ==
Born on 30 September 1919, Stacpoole was the son of Olive Stacpoole (née Lansdell) and Percy Stacpoole. He was descended from early Tasmanian and New Zealand colonial settlers, and was of Irish descent on his father's side. Stacpoole was educated at Mount Albert Grammar School in Auckland from 1932 to 1935, becoming head librarian and a member of the school's hockey 1st XI. He later studied architecture at Auckland University College where he was a contemporary of Stephen Jelicich and Anthony Treadwell.

During World War II, Stacpoole served as an officer in the 2nd Battalion, Auckland Regiment. However, he contracted tuberculosis and spent 18 months of the war in hospital.

== Architectural practice ==
Following a period working in architectural practices in Auckland and London, Stacpoole joined the architectural division of the Ministry of Works, and soon became the advisory architect to the New Zealand Historic Places Trust. He served on the latter organisation's council and as chair of its buildings classification committee. He was intimately involved as architect in the restoration and furnishing of numerous listed historic buildings in New Zealand, including Ewelme Cottage, Waimate North mission house, Alberton and Government House in Auckland, and Kemp House.

== Historian ==
As an historian, Stacpoole wrote about New Zealand's architectural and social history, as well as family history and biography. He wrote seven books and many shorter works, and contributed nine biographies to the Dictionary of New Zealand Biography.

=== Selected publications ===
- Stacpoole, John (1971). William Mason: the first New Zealand architect. Oxford University Press.
- Stacpoole, John; Beaven, Peter (1972). Architecture 1820–1970. Wellington: A.H. & A.W. Reed.
- Stacpoole, John (1976). Colonial architecture in New Zealand. Wellington: A.H. & A.W. Reed. ISBN 0-589-00930-3.
- Stacpoole, John (1996). "Pilgrim, Ada". Dictionary of New Zealand Biography. Ministry for Culture and Heritage.
- Stacpoole, John (2007). Sailing to Bohemia: a life of the Honourable William Swainson. Auckland: Puriri. ISBN 9780908943357.
- Stacpoole, John (2009). Beyond the ivy curtain: the story of the Northern Club, 1869–2009 (revised ed.). Auckland: Northern Club. ISBN 9780473158125.

== Other activities ==
Stacpoole had a long involvement with the Auckland City Art Gallery and served as chair of the Mckelvie Trust, which administers the bequest of James Mackelvie to the gallery. In 2005, Stacpoole donated his collection of almost 1000 books of Irish literature to Auckland Libraries.

== Death ==
Stacpoole died in Auckland on 5 September 2018.

== Honours ==
In the 1975 Queen's Birthday Honours, Stacpoole was appointed an Officer of the Order of the British Empire, for services to the preservation of historic buildings. In 2004, he was elected an honorary life member of the Historic Places Trust. He was also a Fellow of the Auckland War Memorial Museum, and in 2013 he was inducted into the Mount Albert Grammar School hall of distinction.
