= Roy Henry (footballer) =

Australian rules footballer, born 1907

Personal information
- Full name: Roy Henry
- Born: 30 May 1907
- Died: 25 November 1987 (aged 80)
- Height: 179 cm (5 ft 10 in)

Playing career^{1}
Years	Club	Games (Goals)
1929	Fitzroy	2 (0)
- ^{1} Playing statistics correct to the end of 1929.

Roy Henry (30 May 1907 – 25 November 1987) was an Australian rules footballer who played with Fitzroy in the Victorian Football League (VFL).
