= Len Aston =

GB & England international rugby league footballer

Personal information
- Full name: Leonard Aston
- Born: 14 June 1920; Prescot, England
- Died: 19 November 1987 (aged 67)

Playing information
- Position: Centre, Prop, Second-row, Loose forward
Club
Years	Team	Pld	T	G	FG	P
1939–50	St. Helens	126	26	9	0	96
Representative
Years	Team	Pld	T	G	FG	P
1947–48	Lancashire	2	1	0	0	3
1947–48	England	3	2	0	0	6
1947	Great Britain	3	1	0	0	3

Leonard "Len" Aston (14 June 1920 – 19 November 1987) was an English professional rugby league footballer who played in the 1930s, 1940s and 1950s. He played at representative level for Great Britain and England, and at club level for St. Helens, as a centre, prop, second-row or loose forward.

== Background ==
Aston was born in Prescot, Lancashire, England.

== Playing career ==
=== Testimonial match ===
Len Aston's testimonial match at St. Helens took place against Hull F.C. at Knowsley Road, St. Helens on Saturday 3 March 1951.

=== International honours ===
Len Aston won caps for England while at St. Helens in 1947 against Wales, and France, in 1948 against France, and won caps for Great Britain while at St. Helens in 1947 against New Zealand (3 matches).
