= Tommy Burns (rugby league) =

Australian rugby league footballer

- Tommy Burns. St.George. 1921

Personal information
- Full name: Thomas Lawrence Beirne
- Born: 20 May 1894 Paddington, New South Wales
- Died: 1 November 1987 (aged 93) Peakhurst, New South Wales

Playing information
- Position: Halfback
Club
Years	Team	Pld	T	G	FG	P
1920	Eastern Suburbs	3	1	0	0	3
1921–26	St. George	55	10	2	0	24
	Total	58	11	2	0	27

Tommy Burns (1894–1987) was an Australian rugby league footballer who played in the 1920s.

== Playing career ==
Burns was the first halfback at St. George in their first season, 1921. He went on to play 76 grade games for St George, 53 of them in first grade.

Burns started at the Moore Park (Paddington) juniors in 1909 and won three premierships with the club 1909–1911. After serving with the AIF during World War One he returned to league, captaining the Eastern Suburbs President Cup team in 1919. Burns was graded at Easts for 1920 and played first grade with them during the season, then moved to the brand new St George club for their opening year in 1921. Burns retired at the end of the 1926 season.

== War service ==
Burns also fought in the Australian Army during WW1 in the 18th Battalion, C Company.

== Death ==
Burns died at Peakhurst, New South Wales on 1 November 1987, although he lived most of his life at Arncliffe, New South Wales.
