= Keith Sarovich =

Australian cricketer

Personal information
- Born: 20 May 1915; Melbourne, Australia
- Died: 23 November 1987 (aged 72); Atherton, Queensland, Australia

Domestic team information
- Years: Team
- 1941: Victoria
- Source: Cricinfo, 29 November 2015

Keith Sarovich (20 May 1915 – 23 November 1987) was an Australian cricketer. He played seven first-class cricket matches for Victoria in 1941. From 1942 to 1945 Sarovich served with Australian forces during the second world war, before returning to Australia as a cricketer.

== See also ==
- List of Victoria first-class cricketers
