= Merv Harvey (footballer) =

Australian rules footballer

Personal information
- Full name: Mervyn Hart Harvey
- Born: 7 July 1922; Fitzroy North, Victoria
- Died: 21 November 1987 (aged 65); Thornbury, Victoria
- Original team: Collingwood Juniors
- Height: 183 cm (6 ft 0 in)
- Weight: 89 kg (196 lb)

Playing career^{1}
| Years | Club | Games (Goals) |
| 1943 | Collingwood | 1 (1) |
- ^{1} Playing statistics correct to the end of 1943.

Mervyn Hart "Merv" Harvey (7 July 1922 – 21 November 1987) was an Australian rules footballer who played with Collingwood in the Victorian Football League (VFL).
