= Cyril White (cricketer) =

South African cricketer

Personal information
- Full name: Cyril de Lacey White
- Born: 1 January 1909; Butterworth, South Africa
- Died: 30 November 1987 (aged 78); East London, South Africa
- Source: Cricinfo, 12 December 2020

Cyril White (1 January 1909 – 30 November 1987) was a South African cricketer. He played in 38 first-class matches from 1929/30 to 1950/51. In a match against Griqualand West in the 1946/47 season, White took three catches from three successive balls while fielding at short leg.
