= Alastair MacDonald Watson =

English cricketer

Alastair MacDonald Watson (29 January 1909 – 19 November 1987) played first-class cricket for Somerset in four matches in 1932 and 1933. He was born at Croydon, Surrey and died at Alverstoke, Hampshire.

A tail-end right-handed batsman and a right-arm fast bowler, MacDonald Watson was a Royal Navy officer with little time for first-class cricket. He played a single match in 1932 and then three in 1933. In his third game, he took five Derbyshire wickets for just 27 runs in 14 overs in the match at Ilkeston, and these constituted more than half of his first-class haul of eight wickets in his four games.
