= Bill Donald =

Australian rules footballer

Personal information
- Full name: William Claude Donald
- Born: 28 July 1899; Rutherglen, Victoria
- Died: 1 November 1987 (aged 88); Heidelberg, Victoria
- Original team: Hume Weir (O&MFL)

Playing career^{1}
Years	Club	Games (Goals)
1927	Carlton	2 (0)
1927	Fitzroy	1 (0)
Total		3 (0)
- ^{1} Playing statistics correct to the end of 1927.

William Claude Donald (28 July 1899 – 1 November 1987) was an Australian rules footballer who played with Carlton and Fitzroy in the Victorian Football League (VFL).
