= Royal New Zealand Foundation of the Blind =

The Royal New Zealand Foundation of the Blind or Blind Foundation, now publicly branded as Blind Low Vision NZ, is a provider of services to blind, deafblind and people with vision-impairment in New Zealand.

== History ==
The Foundation began in 1890 as the Jubilee Institute for the Blind with a school and residence in Parnell, Auckland. Sheltered workshops and hostels were provided for many years. These were phased out at the end of the twentieth century in favour of mainstreaming, members' greater integration into the community. A school run by the Foundation became part of the public school system.

The Royal New Zealand Foundation of the Blind Act 2002 allows for the Foundation to become an incorporated society.

After a rebranding consultation process, the public name of the Royal New Zealand Foundation of the Blind, changed to Blind Foundation in December 2013.

== Services ==
Blind Low Vision NZ's website lists the following services: emotional support, equipment, financial assistance, volunteer assistance, mobility, guide dogs, employment assistance, peer support, recreation, reading and writing in audio, braille and other formats, library, Telephone Information Service, accessible formats (braille, audio, electronic text and large print), adaptive communications and technology.

The majority of the organisation's funding comes from public donations.
