= Arthur Simmons =

Arthur Simmons may refer to:

- Arthur Simmons (cricketer) (1909–1990), Australian cricketer
- Arthur E. Simmons (American football) (fl. 1940s–1960s), American college football coach
- Arthur E. Simmons (politician) (1905–1986), member of the Illinois House of Representatives
- Art Simmons (Arthur Eugene Simmons; 1926–2018), American jazz pianist

== See also ==
- Arthur Simmons Stables Historic District a historic stable complex in Mexico, Audrain County, Missouri
