= Woody McCorvey =

American football coach

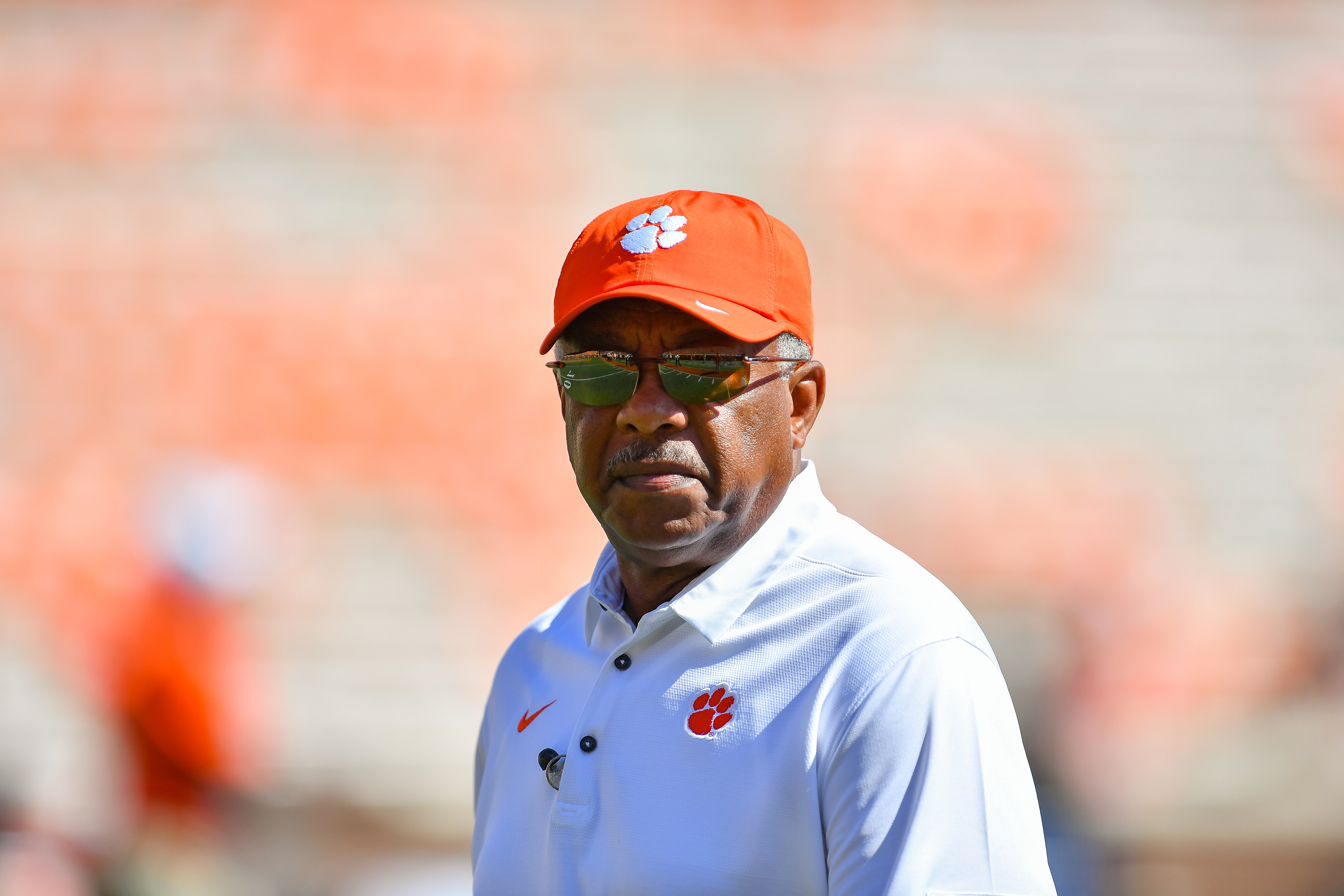

Current position
- Title: Chief of staff
- Team: Clemson
- Conference: ACC

Coaching career (HC unless noted)
- 1972–1977: J. M. Tate JS (FL)
- 1978: North Carolina Central (assistant)
- 1979–1982: Alabama A&M (assistant)
- 1983–1985: Clemson (TE)
- 1986–1989: Clemson (WR)
- 1990–1995: Alabama (WR)
- 1996: Alabama (OC/WR)
- 1997: Alabama (AHC/WR)
- 1998: South Carolina (WR)
- 1999–2003: Tennessee (RB)
- 2004–2008: Mississippi State (OC)
- 2009–present: Clemson (administrator)

Woodrow McCorvey is a long-time American football coach and administrator who currently serves as the chief of staff for the football team at Clemson University. He has spent more than four decades in college football, including two stints at Clemson in various capacities and coaching roles at four Southeastern Conference programs during his career. McCorvey coached at the Division I level for 26 years, earning bowl berths in 17 of those seasons, and coached or signed 36 players who went on to professional football careers as well. He worked for three coaches in the College Football Hall of Fame, including holding significant roles under Danny Ford, Gene Stallings and Phil Fulmer, and worked for four national championship coaches in Ford, Fulmer, Stallings and Dabo Swinney.

== Early life and education ==
McCorvey was born in Grove Hill, Alabama, and was raised in Atmore, Alabama, where his father, Woodrow Sr., served as the principal of Escambia County Training School for 39 years. After lettering in football and basketball in high school, he later played quarterback at Alabama State from 1968 to 1971, helping the Hornets to a 25–15–1 record in that span under the leadership of head coaches Whitney L. Van Cleve (1968) and Henry Holbert (1969–1971). He earned his bachelor's degree from Alabama State in 1972 and added a master's degree from the University of West Florida in 1977.

== Career ==
=== Early years ===
McCorvey began his coaching career J. M. Tate High School in Cantonment, Florida, where he coached from 1972 to 1977. After six seasons at the high school level, he began his college coaching career at North Carolina Central in 1978. One year later, he was hired as an assistant coach at Alabama A&M. In his four seasons there, he helped the program produce the sixth-ranked rushing offense in Division II in 1981 after finishing 11th in the nation in scoring offense in 1980.

=== Clemson (1983–1989) ===
McCorvey was hired at Clemson prior to the start of the 1983 and coached the tight ends from 1983 to 1985 and the wide receivers from 1986 to 1989. In that span, he helped Clemson to a 60-19-3 overall record and three ACC titles. During that time frame, the Tigers were invited to the 1985 Independence Bowl, the 1986 and 1989 Gator Bowls, as well as the 1988 and 1989 Florida Citrus Bowls. The Tigers went 10-2 record in each of his last three seasons under Hall of Fame head coach Danny Ford. McCorvey recruited future Pro Bowlers Donnell Woolford and Chester McGlockton. He also coached NFL players Keith Jennings and K.D. Dunn during his first stint at Clemson.

=== Alabama (1990–1997) ===
McCorvey coached for eight seasons at Alabama, from 1990 to 1997, serving as wide receivers coach throughout his tenure and adding offensive coordinator duties in 1996 and the title of assistant head coach in 1997. He helped the Crimson Tide to five top-25 finishes in his tenure, including three top-five finishes. During the 1990-96 era, Alabama posted a 70-16-1 record and played in six bowl games. With McCorvey at the controls of the offense in 1996, Alabama finished 10-3, including a win over Michigan in the Outback Bowl.

Alabama won the 1992 national title with McCorvey serving as wide receivers coach, a year punctuated by a 34-13 win over heavily-favored Miami (Fla.) in the Sugar Bowl. One of his receivers on that team was walk-on Dabo Swinney, who would later coach with McCorvey at Alabama and then hire McCorvey at Clemson during Swinney's multiple-national-championship-winning run with the Tigers.

McCorvey became the first African-American offensive coordinator in Alabama history in 1996. In that role, McCorvey helped running back Shaun Alexander establish a number of school records and go on to a Pro Bowl career with the Seattle Seahawks. In 1993, David Palmer broke program records for catches and receiving yards and earned first-team All-America honors. Palmer finished third in the Heisman Trophy balloting, the highest finish in history for an Alabama player at the time.

=== South Carolina (1998) ===
McCorvey spent one season at South Carolina, where he served as the wide receivers coach in 1998 under former Clemson assistant coach and later Clemson colleague Brad Scott.

=== Tennessee (1999–2003) ===
McCorvey coached at Tennessee for five years from 1999 to 2003. Tennessee recorded a 46-14 record with McCorvey overseeing the running game, helping power the Volunteers to the 2000 Fiesta Bowl, 2001 Cotton Bowl, 2002 Citrus Bowl, and 2002 and 2003 Peach Bowls. McCorvey's Volunteers won three straight New Year’s Day Bowl games from 2000 to 2002 in that span.

Tennessee's rushing attack flourished under McCorvey's guidance. The Volunteers led the SEC in rushing in 1999, averaging 191.3 yards per game. His work helped tailback Travis Stephens lead the SEC in rushing yards (1,464) in 2001. The year before, McCorvey helped tailback Travis Henry finish second in the league (and 14th in the nation) with 1,314 in rushing yards. He also coached Jamal Lewis, who finished in the top five on Tennessee's all-time list for career rushing yards and became an All-Pro after being selected as the No. 5 overall pick of the 2000 NFL draft.

=== Mississippi State (2004–2008) ===
In 2004, McCorvey departed Tennessee to serve as offensive coordinator at Mississippi State for Sylvester Croom, who had been hired as the first African-American head coach in Southeastern Conference (SEC) history. He spent five seasons with the Bulldogs, serving as assistant head coach and offensive coordinator in addition to coaching the quarterbacks. The Bulldogs won eight games in 2007, including wins over Auburn, Alabama and Mississippi. McCorvey's presence helped 2010 NFL Draft pick Anthony Dixon set numerous records for the Bulldogs, including true freshman records for rushing attempts, rushing yards and rushing touchdowns.

=== Return to Clemson (2008 - Present) ===
In December 2008, Swinney approached McCorvey to return to Clemson in an administrative and advisory role. Said Swinney of McCorvey: “He is my national security advisor. My experience with him dates to my days as a player at Alabama when he was my position coach. He coached at Clemson in the 1980s under Danny Ford and knows all about our winning tradition.”

In his current role, McCorvey serves as the primary liaison between Swinney and the athletic and IPTAY administrations. He also oversees the management of the football administrative offices. He supervises the football budget and works with academic staff, as Clemson entered 2021 as one of only three FBS programs to finish in the top 10 percent of all FBS programs in APR scores in nine of the last 10 years.

Since McCorvey's return through the conclusion of the 2020 season, Clemson is 136-30 with seven ACC titles, eight division titles (plus an additional championship berth in a divisionless season in 2020) and has posted 10 bowl wins in 12 years, including national championships in 2016 and 2018.

== Awards and accolades ==
In 2010, McCorvey was inducted into the Atmore (Ala.) Hall of Fame. He was inducted into the Alabama Sports Hall of Fame in 2020 as part of an induction class that included Sylvester Croom, with whom he coached at Mississippi State. He was also the recipient of the 2015 AFCA Outstanding Achievement Award for his contributions to college football.

McCorvey's contributions to the game were also recognized informally following the 2018 season. That year, Dabo Swinney became the first three-time Paul "Bear" Bryant Award recipient in history after Clemson finished the first 15-0 season in major college football since 1897. During his acceptance speech, Swinney called McCorvey to the stage and praised him in a touching tribute. In discussing McCorvey's career impact and how football brought the two men of different backgrounds together, Swinney said, "You don't know how impactful Woody McCorvey has been in my life. He's been right by my side, so even though my name may be on this trophy tonight, man, he ought to be on there, too."

McCorvey has also served as a respected voice on a number of the sport's advisory committees. In 2013, he was on the Rose Bowl Advisory Committee and returned to that role in 2017. He was a member of the College Football Playoff Advisory Committee in 2014-15 as well.

== Personal ==
McCorvey and his wife, Ann, have a son, Marlon, daughter-in-law, Brooke, and grandson, Beau.
