= Little Hall =

Little Hall is the name of:

- Little Hall (University of Alabama), a historic building in Tuscaloosa, Alabama, in the United States
- Little Hall, Heslington, a historic building in North Yorkshire, in England
- Little Hall, Melbourne, a hall of residence of the University of Melbourne, in Australia

== See also ==
- Little Hall Island, an island in Nunavut, Canada
