= Little Hall (University of Alabama) =

Building in Tuscaloosa, Alabama

Coordinates: 33°12′31″N 87°32′44″W

- Interactive map of Little Hall
- Location: University of Alabama; 670 Judy Bonner Dr; Tuscaloosa, AL 35401
- Owner: University of Alabama
- Operator: University of Alabama
- Capacity: n/a

Construction
- Opened: 1915
- Architect: Frank Lockwood

Tenant
- Alabama Crimson Tide men's basketball (1915–39)

Little Hall is a historic building on the campus of the University of Alabama at Tuscaloosa, Alabama. It was built in 1915 and designed by Frank Lockwood of Montgomery as the university's first stand-alone gymnasium. The gymnasium was named for William Gray "Bill" Little (1873–1938), the student credited with introducing football to the university. It was in use by the Alabama Crimson Tide men's basketball from 1915 to 1939, when Foster Auditorium opened nearby. The gym received an expansion in 1935 (now known as Archie Wade Hall), and has been converted twice; once in the 1950s for the School of Nursing, and again in 1967 to host the School of Social Work, its current tenant.
