= History of Alabama Crimson Tide football =

The Alabama Crimson Tide football team represents the University of Alabama in American football.

== Overview ==
=== Early history (1892–1957) ===
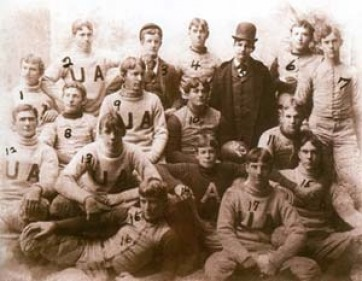
The Alabama football team in 1892. Among those labeled are head coach Beaumont (5), Bankhead (9), and Little (10).

University of Alabama law student William G. Little learned how to play American football while attending prep school in Andover, Massachusetts and began teaching the sport to fellow Alabama students in early 1892. Later in the year, the school formed an official team of 19 players, with Little as captain and E. B. Beaumont as head coach. Among those also on the team were William B. Bankhead, future U.S. Speaker of the House, and Bibb Graves, future governor of Alabama. The team was referred to as the "Cadets", the "Crimson White", or simply as "the varsity". Its first season was 1893 when Alabama lost to both Auburn and Sewanee in 1893.

After the winless 1893 campaign, Eli Abbott, also who played for the team in 1892, returned as a player-coach and led the 1894 squad. Alabama opened the season with a loss against Ole Miss in what was its first game ever played outside the state of Alabama. The Crimson White then rebounded and won their final three games. After a victory over Tulane at New Orleans, Alabama returned to Birmingham where they defeated Sewanee in their only home game of the season. They then closed the year with their first all-time win over Auburn at Montgomery. In spring 1895, after it became public that the football team had hired non-students to play football, the university board of trustees passed a rule that prohibited athletic teams from competing off-campus for athletic events. As such, all games scheduled for the 1896 season were played on campus at The Quad. The team also joined its first conference, the Southern Intercollegiate Athletic Association (SIAA).

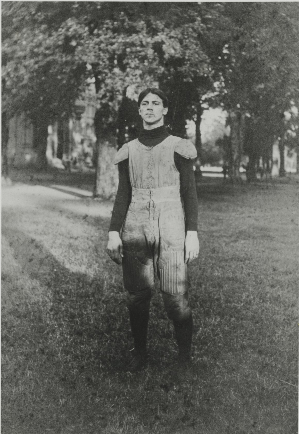
Auxford Burks (pictured) was the school's "first running back hero".

In their first game of 1896, Alabama shutout the Birmingham Athletic Club before they lost their only game of the season against Sewanee. The Crimson White then closed the season with their by playing rival Mississippi State (then Mississippi A&M) for the first time. Alabama won 20–0. The 1896 team's manager was Champ Pickens, who gave Alabama's band its name of the "Million Dollar Band", and was the namesake of the Champ Pickens Trophy. The team played only one game during the 1897 season and did not field a team for the 1898 season because of a ban restricting student athletes from traveling away from campus. The team's quarterback in 1897 was Ed Tutwiler, the son of Birmingham philanthropist Edward Magruder Tutwiler. One account reads "Ed Tutwiler is one of the greatest stars that football in the south ever produced. He was a graduate of the University in the class of '98, and afterwards went to the University of Virginia. He was considered the pluckiest quarterback in the south, and was noted for head work and generalship." The team resumed play in 1899 after the ban was lifted due to fan and student outcry. Alabama played rival Tennessee for the first time in 1901. The first game ended early in a 6–6 tie, when fans rushed onto the field after a controversial offside call and the umpires were unable to clear out the crowd in the second half. Eli Abbott returned for the 1902 season. The 1903 team beat LSU for the first time, and Auburn for the second time. 1905 saw two All-Southern players for Alabama in Auxford Burks and T. S. Sims. "The overworked Burks, who appeared to bear the entire brunt of Alabama's offense", collapsed on the field during the second half of a 12–5 loss to Georgia Tech. Burks scored in the 30–0 victory over Auburn in what was then the largest crowd ever to see a game in Birmingham (4,000). He was said to be the school's "first running back hero".

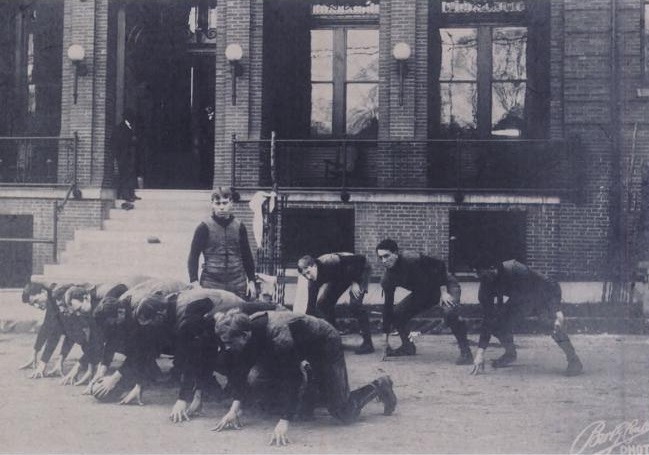
1906 Alabama team, in the middle of 20th street.

Alabama was coached by Doc Pollard from 1906 to 1909. The 1906 team won all its games but one; the loss was the program's most lopsided ever, a 78–0 victory by Vanderbilt. Burks scored all of the points in the 1906 Iron Bowl. Auburn contended Sims was an illegal player. The SIAA denied the claim. Following the 1907 season, the team adopted the "Crimson Tide" nickname. The victory over LSU in 1907 at Monroe Park marked the first Alabama home game played in Mobile. Jack Reidy returned a kickoff for 75 yards and the touchdown with 20 seconds left to give Alabama the win. In 1908, Alabama beat Haskell 9–8 with a 65-yard interception return for a touchdown by Edwards, with five minutes left in the game. In 1909, Alabama had six consecutive shutouts to go 5–0–1 before they surrendered their first touchdown against Tulane in their 5–5 tie. Alabama completed their season with a 12–5 loss to defending SIAA champion LSU at Birmingham to finish 5–1–2. 1910 saw quarterback Farley Moody defeat Tulane by a 5–3 score with a 20-yard field goal. Alabama was coached by Tubby Graves from 1911 to 1914. 1912 saw quarterback Moody make All-Southern teams. In the Georgia game that season, the Bulldogs ran a trick play in which they threw the ball to a receiver who was dressed as a waterboy, on the field, carrying a bucket. The play did not prove decisive, as Georgia fumbled the ball away soon after, but the Bulldogs won the game after they recovered a botched Alabama field goal and scored in the final minutes. In 1914, quarterback Charlie Joplin was ruled ineligible because he refused to sign an affidavit stating that he had never played professional baseball.

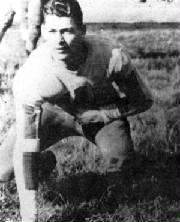
Bully Van de Graaff (pictured) was the Tide's first All-American in 1915.

Alabama was coached by Thomas Kelley from 1915 to 1917. In 1915, Kelley coached only the first half of season (4–0) before he came down with typhoid fever. Athletic director B. L. Noojin and former Alabama quarterback Farley Moody took over the head coaching duties for the remaining four games of the season. (Note: The 2–2 mark achieved in Kelly's absence is still credited to his record at Alabama of 17–7–1.) Bully Van de Graaff who punted, kicked, and played tackle, offense and defense, was Alabama's first All-American in 1915. Bully's older brothers Adrian and Hargrove had also been All-Southern players under Coach Graves. Their younger brother was Robert J. Van de Graaff, inventor of the Van de Graaff generator which produces high voltages. Quarterback Cecil Creen made some All-Southern teams in 1916 and was given honorable mention on the All-America team of Walter Camp. He ran in the touchdown in the fourth quarter to defeat Mississippi College 13–7.

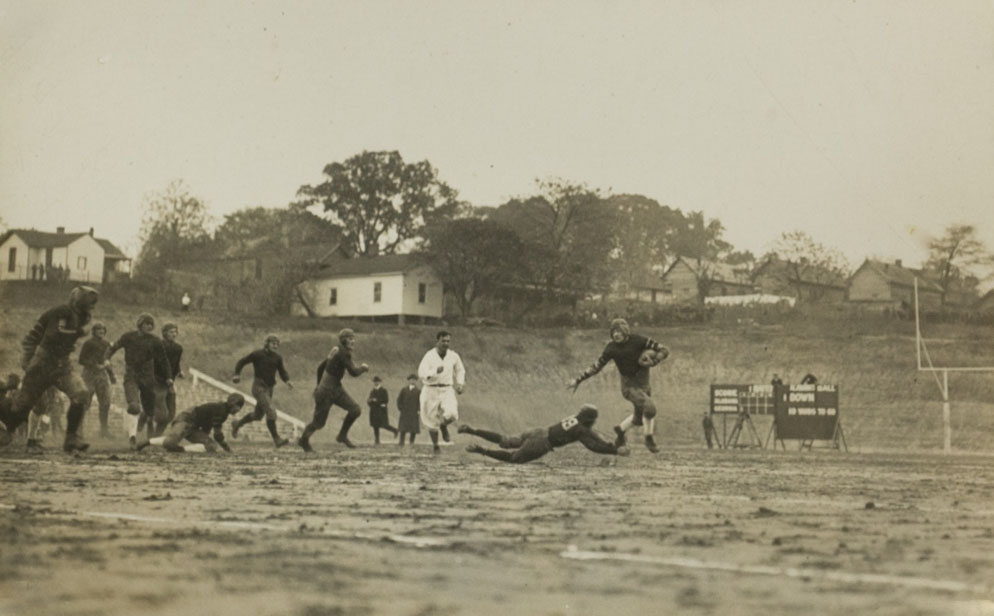
Charles Bartlett running around end vs. Georgia (1922).

B.L. Noojin was selected to be the coach for the 1918 season, but no games were played due to World War I. Former players Joplin and Moody were both casualties of the war. The school resumed play once again in 1919 under coach Xen C. Scott. Arguably the best season under Scott was his first, in which the team lost its only game to Vanderbilt and set a school record for victories in a season with an 8–1 record. The 1919 team was led by All-Southern players in the line like Ike Rogers and Tram Sessions; and in the backfield such as Mullie Lenoir and Riggs Stephenson. The next season the Tide went 10–1 suffering its only loss 14–21 at the hands of SIAA champion Georgia. Baseball Hall of Fame inductee Joe Sewell also played for Scott. Alabama joined the newly formed Southern Conference (SoCon) in 1922. Coach Scott led Alabama to a 9–7 upset victory over Penn, one of the first times Alabama received national coverage. An account of the drive to beat Penn reads: "Alabama came back strong in the second quarter on the back of leader Charles Bartlett. Bartlett drove the team down the field on most notably a 22-yard run from the 27 that put the ball on the Penn 4-yard line. Pooley Hubert went in the rest of the way but fumbled the ball in the end zone. Shorty Propst recovered the ball and gave Alabama the 9–7 lead that they would never give up." After the game, when the news reached Tuscaloosa, "they started burning red fires and celebrating in a manner that Tuscaloosa had never seen before in its history." The next week Alabama beat LSU 47–3 in what was then the largest crowd ever to witness a game at Denny Field. Bartlett was given honorable mention on the All-America team of Walter Camp.

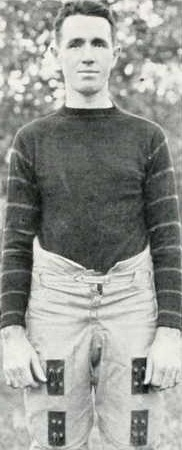
Coach Wade at Vanderbilt

Shortly after head coach Xen Scott's death, Brown University alum and Vanderbilt assistant Wallace Wade was hired as the new Alabama football head coach. While Wade assisted Dan McGugin at Vanderbilt the Commodores went 15–0–2 over two seasons. The team saw success quickly, losing just one southern game in his first year when Florida upset the Tide to close the season. The 1924 team won the Southern Conference, upset by Centre in its only loss. In 1925, Wade would lead the team to an undefeated season capped with a Rose Bowl win over Washington for the team's first national championship. The win later became known as "the game that changed the South". Intent on building a dynasty, athletics director George Denny took advantage of the team's newfound popularity and began advertising the University of Alabama in metropolitan New York City newspapers. Students, football players and fans alike from the Northeast began enrolling at Alabama at such a rate that by 1930, over one-third of the student body was from out-of-state. The Crimson Tide repeated as national champions in 1926. Wade led the Crimson Tide to his third and last national championship in 1930. Wade was under fire after lackluster seasons in 1928 and 1929, which included narrow losses to Robert Neyland's Tennessee Volunteers. As a result, Wade submitted his resignation on April 30, with the caveat that he coach next season. Tailback John Suther described the feeling before the Tennessee game that year, which Alabama won 18–6. "Coach Wade was boiling mad. He was like a blood-thirsty drill sergeant anyway, and those critics made him more fiery ... He challenged us to help him shut up the loudmouths that were making his life miserable." Wade finished his career at Alabama with an overall record of 61–13–3. Wade coached Hall of Fame player Pooley Hubert. Other notable players included Johnny Mack Brown, Hoyt Winslett, Fred Pickhard, Fred Sington, and Herschel Caldwell. Wade took the head coaching position at Duke in 1931.

In 1931, Frank Thomas left his post as an assistant coach at Georgia and accepted the head coaching job at Alabama, where he established himself as one of the top coaches in the nation. His bowl record at Alabama was 4–2, with wins at the Rose Bowl (1935, 1946), Cotton Bowl Classic (1942), and Orange Bowl (1943). He coached future Hall of Fame coach Paul "Bear" Bryant during his time as Alabama's head coach. Other notable players included Don Hutson, Vaughn Mancha, Harry Gilmer, Johnny Cain, and Riley Smith. Alabama would join the Southeastern Conference in 1933, winning the conference's first championship. Thomas would lead Alabama to two more national championships in 1934 and 1941 before health issues related to his smoking habits forced him to retire after a 14-year tenure as head coach of the program. Alabama did not field a team in 1943 because of World War II. Thomas led Alabama to a 115–24–7 overall record. In January 1947, Harold Drew was hired as the head football coach of the Alabama Crimson Tide. In his first year, "Red" Drew led the 1947 Alabama team to an 8–3 record, a berth in the 1948 Sugar Bowl, and a number eight ranking in the final AP poll. In November 1948, he led Alabama to a victory over Georgia Tech that The Tuscaloosa News called "the upset of the season". In November, he led the Crimson Tide to a 55–0 victory over Auburn, a score which remains the most lopsided in the history of the Alabama–Auburn football rivalry. In August 1951, Drew led the East team to a 15–6 victory in the Third Annual All-American High School game in Memphis. He also led the 1952 team to a 10–1–2 record and a 61–6 victory over Syracuse in the 1953 Orange Bowl. Alabama's 55-point margin of victory remains the largest in the history of the Orange Bowl; it was also the highest point total in Orange Bowl history until West Virginia scored 70 points in the 2012 Orange Bowl. When the Orange Bowl bid was announced in November 1952, former Alabama athletes organized to urge the university to sign Drew to a long-term contract, and The Tuscaloosa News reported:

The invitation also is a fine tribute to Coach Harold (Red) Drew and his staff. We doubt if there is a coaching staff in the country that has done a better job than the one done by the Crimson Tide staff in getting Alabama ready for the Georgia Tech and Maryland games.

Drew was selected as the SEC Coach of the Year in 1952, and he was given a two-year contract extension in December of that year. The following year, he led the 1953 team to a Southeastern Conference (SEC) championship and a berth in the 1954 Cotton Bowl Classic. However, the 1954 team finished in sixth place in the SEC with a 4–5–2 record. With the poor showing of the 1954 team, rumors began to spread that Drew would not return as the head coach. On December 2, 1954, Drew was fired as the head coach and replaced with J. B. "Ears" Whitworth. Drew was retained as Alabama's head track coach and associate professor of physical education. Drew stayed on as Alabama's track coach for 23 seasons and through at least 1964.

At the end of his tenure as Alabama's head football coach, Drew's salary was reported to have been about $12,000 per year. In eight years as Alabama's head football coach, Drew compiled a 51–28–7 record. He was inducted into the Alabama Sports Hall of Fame in 1970. Alabama had grown into a major football power and enjoyed consistent success over the past three decades. However, Whitworth would lead the Crimson Tide to its worst three-year stretch in school history. He posted a 4–24–2 record that included a winless season in 1955–to date, Alabama's last winless season on the field in modern times. This was part of a 14-game losing streak from 1955 to 1956. In his first year at Alabama, Whitworth was only allowed to hire only two of his own coaches and forced to retain the rest of former coach Harold Drew's assistants. This included athletic director Hank Crisp, Whitworth's boss, who was in charge of the defense. Whitworth brought assistant coach Moose Johnson with him from Oklahoma A&M. Following successive 2–7–1 seasons in 1956 and 1957, Whitworth was fired and replaced by Alabama alumnus Bear Bryant.

=== Bear Bryant era (1958–1982) ===
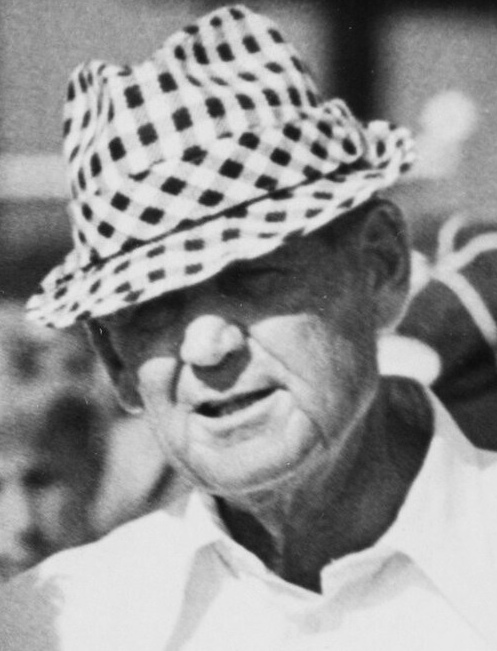
Bear Bryant

Paul William "Bear" Bryant came to the Crimson Tide program in December 1957, after leaving his head coaching position at Texas A&M. On December 8, five days after leaving A&M, Bryant was asked why he left for Alabama. Bryant replied, "Mama called, and when Mama calls, then you just have to come running." Bryant entered an Alabama program which had not had a winning record in four seasons. However, in his first season, Bryant led Alabama to a 5–4–1 record—one more win than Alabama had in the previous three seasons combined. In his fourth season, Bryant led the Crimson Tide to their sixth national championship which included Bryant's first bowl victory with Alabama. From 1961 to 1966, Alabama went 60–5–1, which included three national championships (1961, 1964, 1965), four Southeastern Conference championships, two undefeated seasons, and six bowl berths.

Throughout the 1970s, the Crimson Tide was one of the most dominant teams in college football. During the decade the program posted a record of 103–16–1, winning eight SEC titles and three national championships (1973, 1978, 1979). The very first game of the decade was notable, as the team was thoroughly defeated by the USC Trojans in Birmingham 42–21. This is the game that is generally credited as the catalyst to end segregation in college football. The following season, John Mitchell, an African-American transfer from Eastern Arizona Junior College, played in the rematch, a game that Alabama won 17–10 at the Los Angeles Memorial Coliseum. In that game, Mitchell became the first black player to start for the Tide. Alabama was among the last schools in college football to integrate African-American players.

Bryant was not only loved by the people in and around the state of Alabama and the southeastern U.S., but by coaches all over the nation. John McKay, the legendary USC coach, had these words to say about Bryant. "He was not just a coach, he was the coach". Another quote about Bryant, from Bob Devaney, former Nebraska Cornhuskers head coach, is "He was simply the best there ever was." Bryant's final game as head coach of Alabama came in the 1982 Liberty Bowl. Bryant's retirement made the Liberty Bowl one of the most covered games that season as many news stations and newspapers sent reporters to cover the game. Alabama earned a 21–15 victory over Illinois. During his tenure at Alabama, Bryant led Alabama to a 232–46–9 record. His achievements included 6 national championships, 13 Southeastern Conference titles, 24 bowl appearances, and 12 bowl victories. In his 25 seasons, he led the Crimson Tide to 24 consecutive bowl appearances. At the time of his retirement, Bryant had recorded an NCAA record 323 wins.

Bryant once said if he retired that he would "probably croak in a week" and said, "I imagine I'd go straight to the graveyard." Four weeks after coaching his final game, Bear Bryant died of a heart attack on January 26, 1983.

=== Ray Perkins era (1983–1986) ===
Former New York Giants head coach Ray Perkins replaced Bryant, under whom he played in the early 1960s. In his first season head coach, Alabama finished the regular season at 7–4, just as it had done in the previous year. In the Sun Bowl, Alabama upset the #5-ranked SMU Mustangs 28–7. His second season was far less successful, as Alabama endured its first losing season in 28 years with a 5–6 record, failing to qualify for a bowl game. In 1985, the team fared much better than the previous season, finishing with a 9–2–1 record. Following a dramatic victory over Auburn, the Tide went on to defeat Southern California in the Aloha Bowl. The 1986 season, Alabama went 10–3 as they defeated Notre Dame for the first time in school history, and ended a losing streak versus rival Tennessee. In the season finale in the Sun Bowl, Alabama won 28–6 over the Washington Huskies. Perkins accumulated a 32–15–1 record during his tenure before deciding to leave for the NFL's Tampa Bay Buccaneers. Perkins was the only head coach to lead Alabama to a victory over the Fighting Irish of Notre Dame for nearly thirty years, a feat not even Bear Bryant could ever accomplish.

=== Bill Curry era (1987–1989) ===
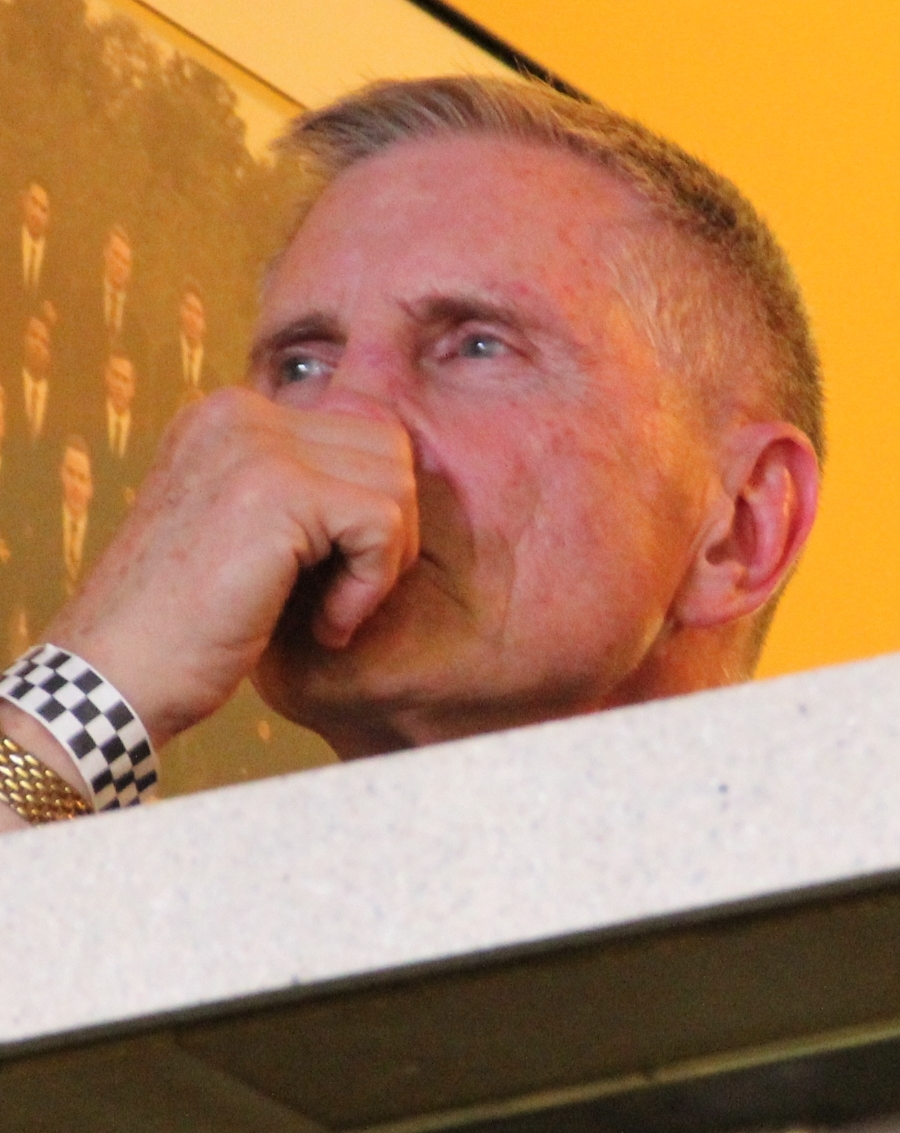
Coach Curry

Bill Curry left his alma mater Georgia Tech and accepted the job as head coach at the University of Alabama. There he posted a record of 26–10, won a share of the SEC title in 1989, Alabama's first since Bryant retired, and made bowl appearances every year of his three-year tenure, the 1988 Hall of Fame Bowl after the 1987 season, the 1988 Sun Bowl after the 1988 season and the 1990 Sugar Bowl after the 1989 season.

In September 1988, Curry refused to fly his Alabama team to play Texas A&M because of fears that Hurricane Gilbert would harm his players. The hurricane never reached Texas A&M at College Station, Texas, and Aggies coach Jackie Sherrill claimed Curry used the threat of weather as an excuse because his quarterback was injured. The game was rescheduled for December 1, when Alabama routed A&M, 30–10. Curry also suspended Alabama quarterback Jeff Dunn for breaking team rules prior to the 1988 Sun Bowl against Army. Curry was honored in 1989 as the SEC Coach of the Year and received the Bobby Dodd Coach of the Year Award. With all the success the Crimson Tide were having, most believed Curry would remain at Alabama for a long time as the head coach. However, he was on far less secure ground than it seemed due to tensions within the athletic department and three straight losses against arch-rival Auburn. Matters came to a head in early 1990, when Alabama offered him a new contract that, among other things, stripped him of his power to hire and fire his own staff. Curry responded by accepting an offer to become head coach at Kentucky. This move shocked the college football world. Curry later was the head coach of the Georgia State Panthers.

=== Gene Stallings era (1990–1996) ===
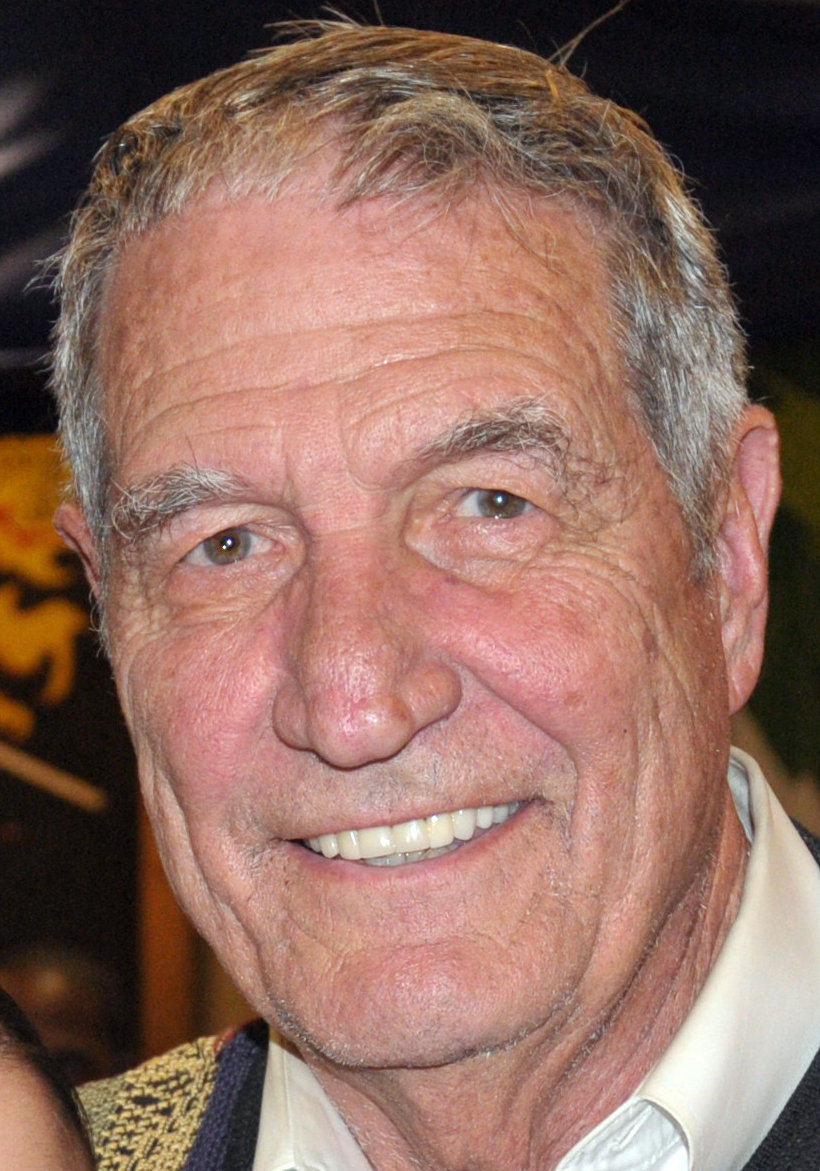
Coach Stallings

Alabama sought someone with ties to Bear Bryant by hiring Gene Stallings, who had been recently fired as head coach of the National Football League's Phoenix Cardinals. Stallings had been a member of the Junction Boys, a group of players who trained under Bryant during his tenure at Texas A&M. As Head Coach of Texas A&M, Stallings had led the Aggies to a 20–16 victory over Bryant's 1967 team in the 1968 Cotton Bowl, after which Bear Bryant carried him off the field to celebrate the victory of his former player. In his first season, the Tide lost their first three games, but rebounded to finish off the season with a 7–5 record which included a berth in the Fiesta Bowl. Alabama lost to Louisville 34–7. The following season proved to be much more successful. Alabama finished with an 11–1 record, losing to SEC Champion Florida Gators 35–0, but defeating rivals Tennessee and Auburn. Alabama finished the regular season with nine consecutive victories and defeated defending national champion Colorado 30–25 in the Blockbuster Bowl.

In just his third season as head coach, Alabama was unbeaten in the regular season, and recorded three shutout victories en route to the inaugural SEC Championship Game. Alabama avoided an upset with a late interception by Antonio Langham, who returned it for a touchdown to secure a 28–21 victory over the Florida Gators. With the victory and SEC Championship, Alabama was invited to the 1993 Sugar Bowl to face the unbeaten Miami Hurricanes, who entered with a 29-game winning streak and that year's Heisman Trophy winner, quarterback Gino Torretta. Despite Miami being favored by 8 points, Crimson Tide routed the Hurricanes 34–13 and finished a perfect 13–0. The victory earned Alabama its 12th national championship—the first since the Bryant era.

The Crimson Tide were forced to forfeit eight victories and one tie achieved during the 9–3–1 1993 season in games participated in by senior cornerback Antonio Langham. The NCAA ruled before Alabama's bowl game that year that Langham had violated NCAA rules by allegedly signing with an agent after the previous season. Stallings' Alabama team was in contention for another national title in 1994. They defeated Tennessee and Auburn en route to an undefeated regular season before losing the SEC Championship Game to the #3-ranked Florida. Alabama finished 12–1 after defeating Ohio State in the Citrus Bowl. Alabama finished ranked No. 5 in the AP Poll.

In August 1995, the NCAA Infractions Committee found four rules violations by the Alabama football program. Alabama cornerback Antonio Langham signed with a sports agent and applied to enter the NFL draft in January 1993, and allegedly received deferred-payment loans. Alabama's football program was placed on probation with scholarship limitations, and a one-year post-season ban. Though going 8–3 in 1995, Alabama was not allowed to play in a bowl game. In 1996 Stallings led the team to a 10–3 record, a victory over Auburn, and a victory over Michigan in the Outback Bowl. The 1996 season was Stallings' last season before retirement. Stallings finished his tenure at Alabama with an impressive 70–16–1 on the field record.

=== Mike DuBose era (1997–2000) ===
Following Gene Stallings's retirement in 1996, defensive coordinator Mike DuBose was promoted to the head coaching position. In 1997, DuBose's first season at Alabama, the Crimson Tide won its first two games and rose as high as #11 in the AP Poll. However, the loss of 30 scholarships removed the team's ability to compete consistently. Alabama lost seven of the last nine games, including their first loss to Kentucky since 1922. Alabama also lost to Tennessee, LSU, and, in an upset, to Louisiana Tech. In the 1997 Iron Bowl Alabama lost after they led 17–15 with less than a minute to go. Faced with third down and long, Alabama ran a screen pass, which resulted in a fumble. Auburn recovered the fumble and kicked the game-winning field goal. DuBose reacted by firing four assistants including the ones who called the final play, Bruce Arians and Woody McCorvey. The Tide finished with the school's worst record since 1957. In his second season, Dubose led Alabama to a 7–5 record, which included a 31–17 win over Auburn. In his third season, DuBose led Alabama to a 10–3 record, including an upset win over the #3-ranked Florida Gators in the regular season, an SEC West Division Championship, and a 34–7 victory over Florida in the SEC Championship. Alabama represented the SEC in the BCS Orange Bowl, losing to the Michigan Wolverines in overtime. With the 1999 success, Alabama began their 2000 season as high as No. 3 in some polls. The expectations went unfulfilled as the Tide slumped to a 3–8 record and news broke about an affair DuBose was having with his secretary. Following the season, DuBose was fired replaced by an up-and-coming coach from TCU, Dennis Franchione.

=== Dennis Franchione era (2001–2002) ===
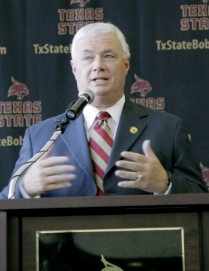
Coach Franchione

Dennis Franchione became the head coach at the University of Alabama in 2001 and led the team, which had posted a 3–8 record the prior season, to a 7–5 record in 2001 and a 10–3 record in 2002. The 2001 team won the Independence Bowl, which became Alabama's first bowl win after five seasons. The 2002 team finished with a 6–2 conference record, placing first in the West Division of the Southeastern Conference. The turnaround success Franchione made prompted Alabama officials to offer Franchione a 10-year contract extension worth $15 million.

However, due to NCAA sanctions resulting from violations of the previous Alabama head coach, Mike DuBose, the 2002 team was ineligible for postseason games, including the SEC Championship Game. In February 2002, Alabama was sanctioned for providing impermissible benefits. (Note: The NCAA report states that a recruiter gave a prospective student $20,000 in cash, lodging and entertainment. During the 2000 season, an assistant football coach in Memphis, Tennessee claimed an Alabama booster paid him $50,000 to encourage one of his players to sign with Alabama. A secret witness that helped convict the University of Alabama was later revealed to be Tennessee coach Phillip Fulmer. The report included allegations of paying a high school coach to influence a prospect, violations of rules for honesty and cooperation, expense-paid visits to the campus, and cash payments to other football players.) Although the NCAA stated that the university fully cooperated with the enforcement staff, Alabama received probation from 2002 to 2006, a post-season ban in 2002 and 2003, and loss of 21 scholarships over 3 years.

Franchione did not sign the offer. Following Alabama's victory over the University of Hawaii and the dismissal of Texas A&M head coach R. C. Slocum, Franchione resigned at Alabama and was named head coach at Texas A&M after publicly stating that he would not leave. His decision was influenced by the NCAA sanctions placed on Alabama. Franchione did not return to Alabama after interviewing for the job, instead informing his players of his decision to accept the job at Texas A&M via video teleconference. Many Alabama fans noted the similarities between Franchione's departure from TCU and how he left Alabama. His departure from Alabama, and his use of video conferencing to inform his players and staff remains, as does his departure at TCU, somewhat controversial.

==== Mike Price controversy ====
On December 18, 2002, Alabama announced that Washington State head coach Mike Price was to be the next coach for the Crimson Tide program. However, in May 2003, following a controversy involving him visiting a strip club, Coach Price was dismissed for behavior unbecoming a representative of the University of Alabama, before ever coaching a game. Following a Sports Illustrated article that elaborated on the incident, Price sued the magazine for defamation, and sued the university, claiming wrongful termination. The lawsuit against the University of Alabama was dismissed and the lawsuit against Sports Illustrated was settled out of court.

=== Mike Shula era (2003–2006) ===
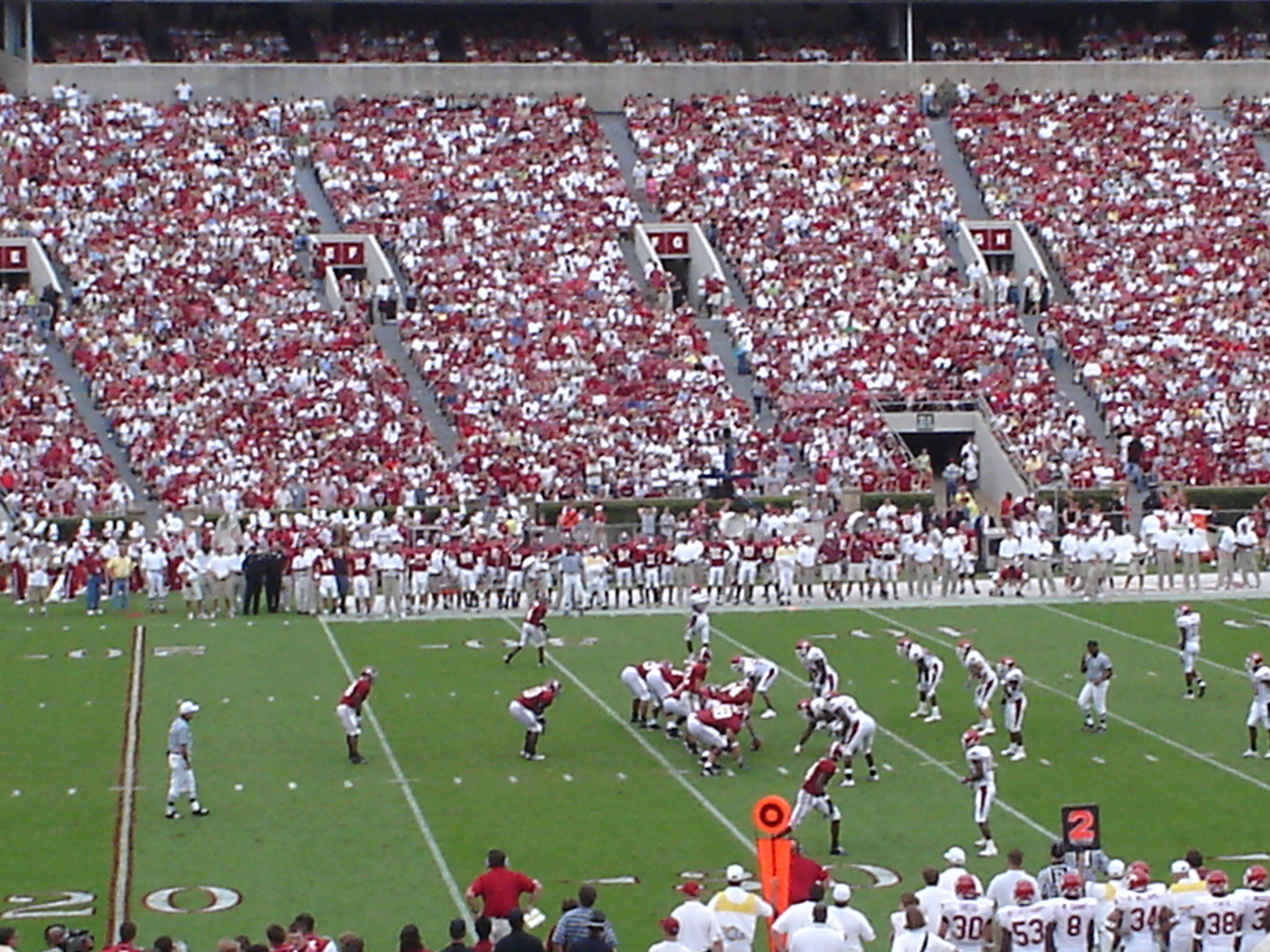
Alabama (in crimson jerseys) defeated Arkansas 24–13, en route to a 10–2 record in 2005.

Less than a week later, Alabama hired Mike Shula, a former Alabama quarterback and then-quarterbacks coach for the Miami Dolphins. Alabama had reportedly been searching mainly for former Alabama players, including considering Sylvester Croom.

With the difficult offseason, the Shula-led Crimson Tide finished 4–9 in 2003. Bama's 2004 team finished the regular season with a 6–6 record and made their first bowl appearance in three seasons. It was also the first season the team began playing all their home games exclusively at Bryant-Denny Stadium. In previous years, the Tide had played many of their biggest home games at Legion Field in Birmingham. During the offseason, Alabama once again was able to gain a "full" recruiting class, following a probation by the NCAA which occurred in 2001 resulting from recruiting violations that occurred during Dubose's tenure. In Shula's third season, Alabama rolled to a 10–2 record, ending with a 13–10 victory in the 2006 Cotton Bowl. However, the following season, Alabama struggled to find consistency. The team ended with a 6–7 overall record, losing every road game of the season. Shula was terminated as head coach of the program, having been the only head coach at Alabama to lose four consecutive games to Auburn. Shula finished his tenure at Alabama with a 26–23 record. The Tide was later forced to vacate the ten wins from 2005 and six wins from 2006 due to NCAA violation from improper use of textbooks, giving the team final official records of 0–2 and 0–7, for the 2005 and 2006 seasons, respectively. (Note: In June 2009, Alabama was sanctioned for textbook and supplies-related infractions, valued at approximately $40,000, involving 201 student-athletes in 16 sports. The football program was forced to vacate 21 wins from the 2005–2007, pay a $43,900 fine, and received a public reprimand and censure. The football program was placed on three years probation, which ended in June 2012.)

=== Nick Saban era (2007–2023) ===
After Shula's firing, Alabama embarked upon a wild coaching search that included the reported hiring (in principle) of West Virginia head coach Rich Rodriguez only for Rodriguez to change his mind before signing a contract. Athletics director Mal Moore would ultimately turn to another West Virginian to fill Alabama's head coaching vacancy. On January 4, 2007, Nick Saban left the NFL's Miami Dolphins and accepted an offer worth US$32 million guaranteed for eight years to be the next Crimson Tide head coach. In his first season, Saban led the Crimson Tide to a 7–6 record. A promising 6–2 start gave way to ending the regular season with four straight losses including an upset loss to Louisiana–Monroe. The team rebounded in its final game, defeating Colorado in the Independence Bowl. Ultimately, as part of the text book scandal that marred the end of Shula's coaching tenure, Alabama was forced to vacate the first five wins of the 2007 football season, leaving them with an official record of 2–6 for the year.

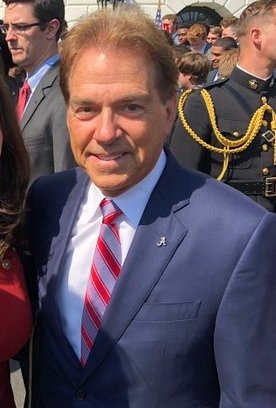
Nick Saban

Saban's second season as Alabama head coach began with a 34–10 victory over the No. 9 ranked Clemson Tigers in the Chick-fil-A College Kickoff in the Georgia Dome. Alabama won the next two games against Tulane and Western Kentucky before entering SEC play. In the following game, Alabama had a convincing 49–14 road-win over Arkansas. The Tide followed that victory with a 41–30 win over the No. 3 ranked Georgia Bulldogs. After the Georgia game, the Tide won consecutive home games against the Kentucky Wildcats and the Ole Miss Rebels and finished the month of October with a 29–9 victory over the Tennessee Volunteers. Following a 35–0 homecoming victory over Arkansas State, the Crimson Tide rose to No. 1 in all major polls in Week 10‍—‌following a loss by No. 1 Texas to the Texas Tech Red Raiders. It was the first time since the 1980 season that Alabama held the top spot during the regular season. During his second year as head coach of the Tide, Saban led his team from a sub-par season in 2007 to a perfect 12–0 regular season record. Saban finished the regular season undefeated for the first time in his career as a head coach as he led the Crimson Tide to its first undefeated regular season since 1994. He appeared on the September 1, 2008, cover of Forbes magazine as "The Most Powerful Coach in Sports."

The Tide took their No. 1 ranking into Baton Rouge, Louisiana, and came out with a 27–21 overtime victory over LSU. With the win, Alabama clinched its first SEC Western Division championship since 1999 and guaranteed the team a trip to the 2008 SEC Championship Game. The Tide then improved to 11–0 with a win at home over Mississippi State. To finish the regular season, Bama defeated in-state rival Auburn, 36–0, the largest margin of victory in the series since 1962. It was Alabama's first victory over Auburn since the 2001 season. In the SEC Championship Game, Alabama suffered its first defeat in a 31–20 loss to the SEC Eastern Division champion Florida Gators (who later won the 2008 BCS Championship), and closed out the season with a 31–17 loss to Utah in the Sugar Bowl to finish the season at 12–2. For his efforts during the season, Saban received several Coach of the Year awards.

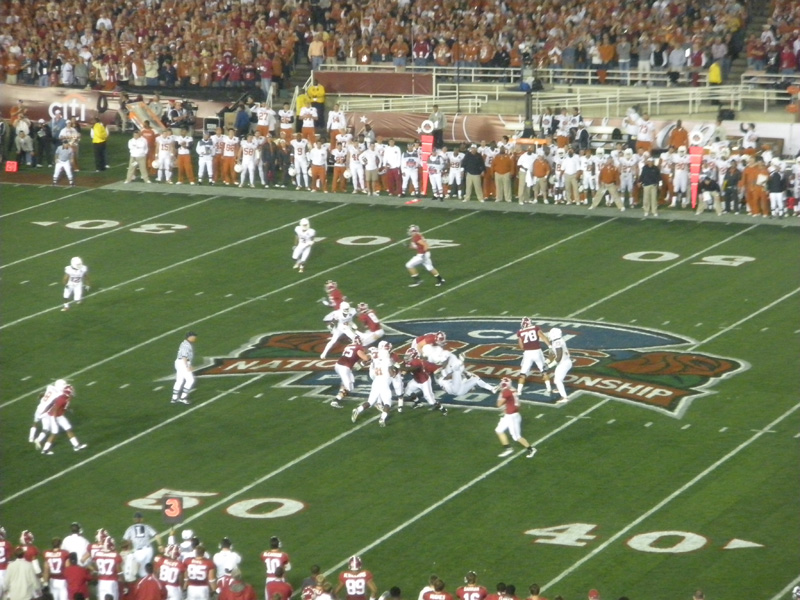
On January 7, 2010, Alabama defeated Texas 37–21 for the BCS National Championship.

In 2009, Nick Saban led Alabama to its second consecutive undefeated regular season (12–0), and won the SEC Championship Game with a victory over the No. 1 ranked Florida Gators to improve to 13–0. On January 7, 2010, Alabama beat Texas 37–21 in the 2010 BCS National Championship Game, finishing the season 14–0 and winning Alabama its 13th national championship. Saban joined Pop Warner as the only coaches to win National Championships at two different FBS schools.

Entering the 2010 season, Alabama was ranked No. 1, but losses to South Carolina, LSU, and Auburn (the eventual 2010 National Champion) gave Saban's Tide a regular season record of 9–3. Alabama was invited to the 2011 Capital One Bowl where they dominated Big 10 Co-Champion Michigan State 49–7 to finish with a 10–3 record. During the 2011 season the Tide was ranked No. 2 in the first 2011 BCS Poll behind division rival LSU. The Tide suffered their only loss of the season 9–6 in overtime to the LSU Tigers on November 5, 2011, in Tuscaloosa. Alabama finished the regular season 11–1 and ranked No. 2 in the BCS poll, which resulted in Alabama playing No. 1 LSU in the 2012 BCS National Championship Game in New Orleans, Louisiana. It was Alabama's second BCS National Championship Game appearance in three years. Alabama won the game 21–0 behind one of the most dominant defensive performances in bowl history to finish the year 12–1. Alabama held LSU to the second fewest total yardage ever allowed in a BCS National Championship Game. It was the first time in a BCS bowl game that the opponent was held scoreless. In winning Alabama's second national championship in three years, Saban became the first coach to win three BCS titles.

In 2012, the Tide was again ranked No. 2 in preseason polls and rose to No. 1 following their first win over Michigan in the Cowboys Classic. Despite a late season loss to SEC newcomer Texas A&M, Alabama won the SEC West and defeated Georgia in the SEC Championship Game to earn a berth in the 2013 BCS National Championship Game. The Tide then beat the No. 1 Notre Dame Fighting Irish 42–14 to finish the season 13–1 and win its second consecutive BCS title and its third in the previous four seasons. The Tide became the first team to win back to back BCS championships and the first team to win three national championships in four seasons since the Nebraska Cornhuskers from 1994 to 1997. In 2013, Alabama finished the regular season 11–1, tied for first in the SEC West Division, but did not go to the SEC Championship Game due to a loss to Auburn, the famous "Kick Six" game. A loss to Oklahoma in the 2014 Sugar Bowl brought Alabama's final 2013 record to 11–2. In 2014, Alabama again completed its regular season with an 11–1 record and won the SEC West and then the 2014 SEC Championship Game, defeating Missouri 42–13. In the new College Football Playoff, the Tide (as the No. 1 seed) lost to Ohio State (#4) 42–35 in the 2015 Sugar Bowl. At the end of the 2014 season, Saban's official record at Alabama was 86–17 (91–17 overall, with 5 wins from the 2007 season being vacated).

In 2015, Alabama compiled an 11–1 regular season record, and then defeated Florida in the 2015 SEC Championship Game, giving Alabama its 25th SEC Title, the most of any team in the conference. The title earned Alabama a #2 seed in the 2015 College Football Playoff. In the second College Football Playoff #2 Alabama defeated #3 Michigan State, in a dominating performance, 38–0, earning Alabama a chance to play #1 Clemson for the National Title. In one of the best games of the young playoff #2 Alabama defeated #1 Clemson 45–40 with the key play being an onside kick recovered by Alabama to swing the momentum in favor of the Crimson Tide. Nick Saban's record at Alabama is 100–18 (with 5 wins vacated from the 2007 season). In August 2016, ESPN.com reported that the 2016–2017 preseason Coaches Top 25 poll ranked Alabama Football as the No. 1 team in the nation. After the 2016 regular season Alabama was selected as the No. 1 seed in the College Football Playoff poll and defeated the #4 seed Washington Huskies in the Peach Bowl. They would later have a rematch with the Clemson Tigers, winners of the Fiesta Bowl, and lost to them 35–31. In August 2017, The coaches poll ranked Alabama #1 for the 2nd straight year. It was later announced that the preseason AP poll had also ranked the Tide #1. #1 Alabama played #3 Florida State in a game billed as the greatest opener of all time. Alabama won easily 24–7 and injured FSU QB Deondre Francois. They defeated Mountain West opponents Fresno and Colorado State 41–10 and 41–23 respectively. Then they dominated SEC opponents Vanderbilt and Ole Miss 59–0 and 66–3. They won a close game against Texas A&M 27–19. Then, they demolished Arkansas 41–9 and Tennessee 45–7. In their first ranked game since Florida State, they beat No. 19 LSU 24–10. Against #18 Mississippi State, the Tide got a tough test, but Jalen Hurts threw a game winning TD to win 31–24. They shutout Mercer 56–0 in their next game.

In Saban's twelfth season, Alabama started the season ranked #1 in the AP and coaches poll for the third consecutive year. In the Camping World Kickoff in Orlando, Florida, the Tide defeated Louisville 51–14. In the home opener, the Tide dominated Arkansas State 57–7. In their conference opener against Ole Miss, the Crimson Tide won 62–7. The Tide defeated Jimbo Fisher and #22 Texas A&M 45–23. The following week, Alabama beat Louisiana 56–14. Alabama then went to Fayetteville and defeated Arkansas 65–31 for its 12th consecutive victory over the Hogs. On homecoming, the Tide defeated Missouri 39–10. In the Third Saturday in October, Alabama defeated rival Tennessee 58–21. It was the longest winning streak against the Vols with 12 wins and most points scored against them. After the bye week, Alabama traveled to Baton Rouge to take on #4 LSU in a matchup between two top-four ranked teams. The Tide shutout the Tigers 29–0, securing its seventh straight division title. The win was Saban's eighth consecutive victory over LSU. The win gave Alabama their 900th win in program history. The Tide shutout #18 Mississippi State 24–0, the second consecutive shutout of a conference opponent for first time since 1980. The win secured Saban his 11th straight 10-win season. The Tide defeated FCS opponent The Citadel 50–17. In the Iron Bowl, Alabama avenged the previous season's only loss, to rival Auburn, defeating the Tigers 52–21. The win secured Saban's fourth undefeated regular season. In the SEC Championship, Alabama, behind backup quarterback Jalen Hurts, overcame a 14-point deficit to defeat #4 Georgia 35–28. The win gave Alabama its 27th SEC Championship. It was Saban's eighth conference title, sixth with Alabama. The win also gave Saban's senior class its 54th win, breaking the previous year's NCAA record for most wins. The following day, Alabama was selected for the College Football Playoff for the fifth year in a row. They were selected as the #1 seed for the third time and played the #4 seed Oklahoma at the Orange Bowl. In the first meeting since the 2014 Sugar Bowl, the Tide ended a three-game losing streak to Oklahoma, winning 45–34. It was Alabama's first Orange Bowl win since 1966. The Tide advanced to the National Championship game for the fourth consecutive year and played the #2 seed Clemson Tigers. In the third title game in four years against Clemson, Saban suffered his worst loss at Alabama, losing 44–16. Saban fell to 2–2 in CFP championship games. The Tide finished the season 14–1.

To start Saban's thirteenth season, Alabama began the year ranked #2 in the AP and coaches poll. In the Chick-fil-A Kickoff Game, Alabama defeated Duke 42–3. In the home opener, the Tide rolled New Mexico State 62–10. In their conference opener, Alabama traveled to Columbia, SC and defeated South Carolina 47–23. In their next game, Alabama defeated Southern Miss 49–7. Alabama, back in conference play, defeated Ole Miss 59–31. The next day, Alabama moved to #1 in the AP and Coaches poll. It was the twelfth year in a row Alabama was ranked at the top spot at some point during a season. Following a bye week, Alabama traveled to College Station, TX and defeated #24 Texas A&M 47–28. In the Third Saturday in October, the Tide picked up its 13th win a row over Tennessee 35–13. On homecoming, Alabama got its 13th consecutive win over Arkansas 48–7. After a second bye week, Alabama took on #2 LSU in a matchup of top-3 teams for the second consecutive year. LSU handed Saban his first loss of the season, 46–41, snapping an eight-game winning streak against the Tigers. It also snapped Alabama's 31-home-game winning streak. The next week, Alabama defeated Mississippi State 38–7. On Senior day, the Tide dominated Western Carolina 66–3, securing Saban's 12th consecutive 10 win season. In the Iron Bowl, Saban suffered his second loss of the season to rival #15 Auburn 48–45. It's the first time Saban has lost two games in the regular season since 2010 and didn't qualify for the College Football Playoff for the first time. Alabama finished the regular season at 10–2 and ranked thirteenth in the final College Football Playoff rankings. They were selected to face Jim Harbaugh and #14 Michigan in the Citrus Bowl. In the first meeting since 2012, The Tide won 35–16. The Tide finished the season 11–2.

In Saban's 14th season, due to the COVID-19 pandemic in the United States, Alabama's season was cut to an all conference, ten-game season beginning on September 26. Alabama began the season ranked #3 in the AP and Coaches Poll. In the season opener, Alabama went on the road and defeated Missouri 38–19. In the home opener, Alabama defeated #13 Texas A&M 52–24. The following week Saban took on former assistant Lane Kiffin. In a shootout, Alabama defeated Ole Miss 63–48. The 111 points scored was the most in a non-overtime conference game in SEC history. On October 14, 2020, Saban tested positive for COVID-19, along with the university athletic director, Greg Byrne. That Saturday, Saban tested negative and was able to coach Alabama in a top 3 matchup against #3 Georgia. The Tide prevailed 41–24 to improve to 22–0 versus former assistants. In the Third Saturday in October, Alabama won its 14th straight over rival Tennessee 48–17. The next week, the Tide shutout Mississippi State 41–0. Following the bye week, Alabama moved up to #1 in the polls. It's the thirteenth year in a row Alabama has reached the top spot during a season. After an extra week off due to COVID-19, Alabama returned to play defeating Kentucky 63–3. On November 25, Saban returned a positive COVID-19 test. He missed the following game against #22 Auburn in the Iron Bowl, which Alabama won 42–13. The next week, Saban was back on the sideline, as Alabama routed LSU 55–17. The win secured Alabama the SEC West division title, its 15th overall and Saban's 12th as a coach. Alabama finished the regular season undefeated after defeating Arkansas 52–3. It was Saban's fifth undefeated regular season at Alabama. It marks Alabama's 13th consecutive ten-win season as well. In the SEC Championship, Alabama hung on in a high scoring game against #7 Florida 52–46. The win secured Alabama its 28th SEC title and gave Saban his ninth overall. The following day, Alabama was selected for the College Football Playoff for the sixth time in seven years. Alabama was selected as the #1 seed and played the #4 seed Notre Dame in the Rose Bowl. In the first meeting since the 2013 BCS National Championship Game, the Tide defeated the Irish 31–14. It was Alabama's first appearance and win in the Rose Bowl since 1946. On January 5, 2021, DeVonta Smith became Saban's third Heisman Trophy winner. Mac Jones and Najee Harris finished third and fifth respectively in voting. Alabama became the second program to have three players finish in the top five in Heisman voting, joining Army's 1946 team. In the 2021 College Football Playoff National Championship, Alabama defeated #3 Ohio State 52–24 to win its 18th National Championship. The win gave Saban his seventh overall National Title, and sixth with the Crimson Tide. Saban passed Paul W. Bryant for most titles all time. It was Saban's second undefeated season and first since 2009. The Tide finished the season 13–0.

On June 7, 2021, Saban agreed to a contract extension with Alabama. The deal runs through the 2028 season. In his 15th season, Alabama started the season #1 in the preseason AP and Coaches poll, marking the 14th consecutive season the Tide have had the #1 ranking. It's the sixth time Alabama has started the season No. 1 under Saban. In the Chick-fil-A Kickoff Game, Alabama defeated #14 Miami (FL) 44–13 in their first meeting since the 1993 Sugar Bowl. In the home opener, the Tide defeated Mercer 48–14. The following week, Alabama traveled to Gainesville to take on #11 Florida. In the conference opener, The Tide won a close game 31–29. The next week, Alabama defeated Southern Miss 63–14. In the following game, Alabama took on #12 Ole Miss and won 42–21. Alabama traveled to College Station, Texas, to play Texas A&M in the next game. In a back and forth game, the Aggies kicked a last second 28-yard field goal to upset the Tide 41–38. The loss snapped a 19-game win streak, an eight-game win streak against the Aggies, and a 100-game win streak against unranked opponents dating back to 2007. The next week, Alabama bounced back defeating Mississippi State 49–9. In the Third Saturday in October, Alabama defeated Tennessee 52–24 for its 15th consecutive win in the series. Following the bye week, Alabama won a close game against LSU 20–14. Alabama wrapped up non-conference play against New Mexico State winning 59–3. On Senior day, Alabama won another close game over #21 Arkansas 42–35. The win secured Saban his eleventh SEC West title at Alabama. The win gave him his 14th consecutive 10-win season, tying Bobby Bowden for most all time. In the Iron Bowl, Alabama played Auburn in the first overtime game in the rivalry's history, winning 24–22 in four overtimes. The Tide finished the regular season 11–1. In the SEC Championship, Alabama took on #1 Georgia winning 41–24. The victory marked Saban's eighth SEC title with Alabama, and the Tide's 29th SEC championship. The following day, Alabama was selected to the College Football Playoff for the seventh time in eight seasons. They were chosen as the #1 seed and played the #4 seed Cincinnati in the first meeting between the schools since 1990. On December 11, Bryce Young became Saban's fourth Heisman Trophy winner. The win ties him with Frank Leahy for most Heisman winners. In the Cotton Bowl Classic, Alabama defeated Cincinnati 27–6. The win secured Saban's ninth title game appearance in 13 seasons. The Tide played #3 Georgia in a rematch of the SEC Championship in the third All-SEC National title game. In the CFP National Championship, Saban suffered his third title game loss, losing 33–18. The Tide finished the season 13–2.

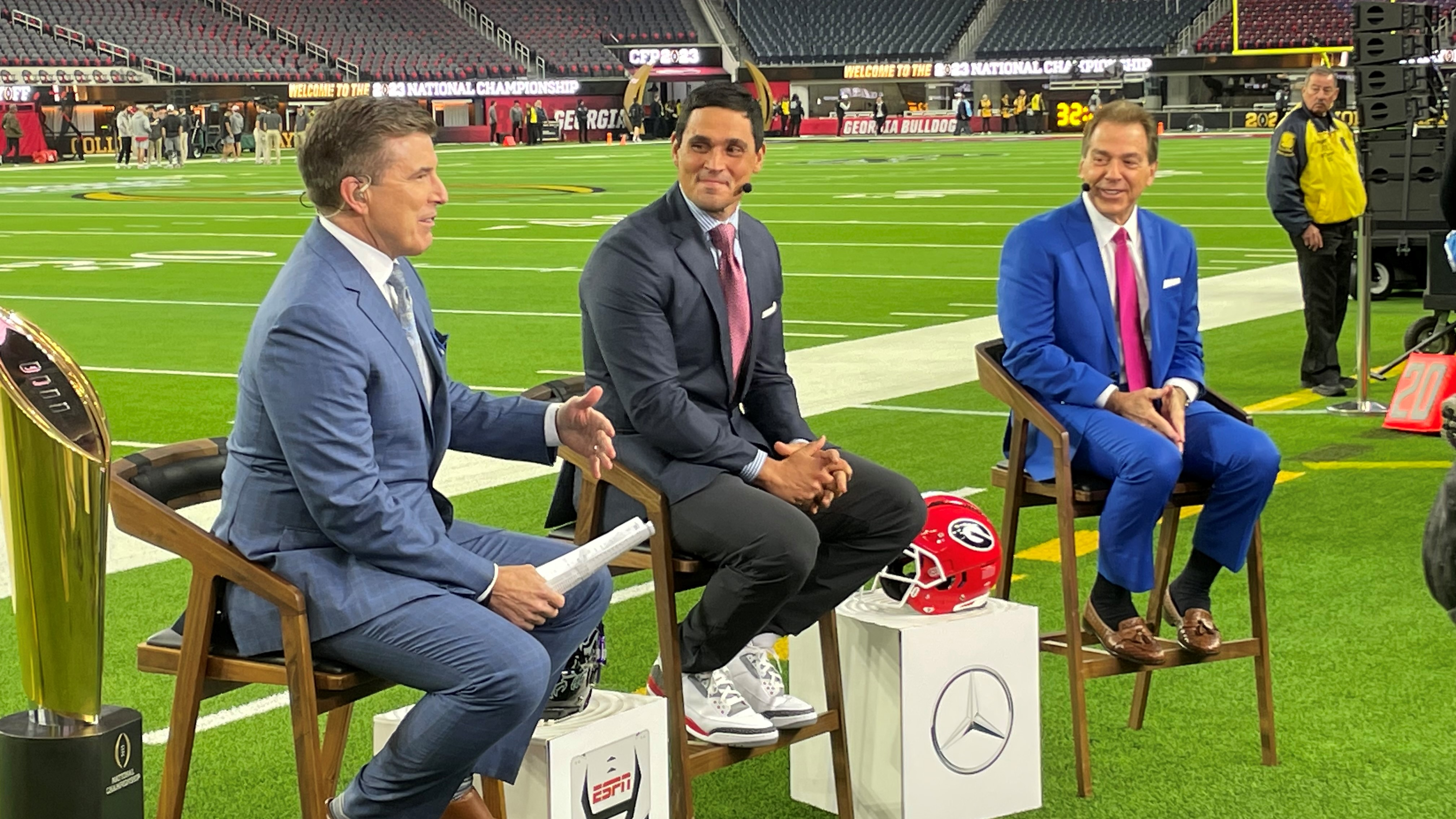
Saban giving pre-game analysis alongside ESPN's Rece Davis and David Pollack ahead of the 2023 College Football Playoff championship game

In his 16th season, Alabama started the year ranked #1 in the preseason AP and Coaches Poll. 2022 marked the 15th consecutive season the Tide have been #1 at some point of the year. In the season opener, Alabama shutout Utah State 55–0. Alabama traveled to Austin, Texas, for the first time since 1922 to play Texas. In the first meeting since the 2010 BCS National Championship Game, Alabama overcame a late deficit to win 20–19. The following week, Alabama defeated Louisiana Monroe 63–7. Alabama opened up conference play with a 55–3 win over Vanderbilt. The next week, the Tide traveled to Fayetteville and defeated #20 Arkansas 49–26. In the following game, the Tide defeated Texas A&M 24–20, avenging last season's only regular season loss. In the Third Saturday in October, Saban suffered his first loss as Alabama coach against #6 Tennessee, losing 52–49 on a last second field goal at Neyland Stadium in Knoxville. The loss snapped Alabama's longest winning streak against the Vols at fifteen. On homecoming, the Tide bounced back defeating #24 Mississippi State 30–6. Following a bye week, Alabama traveled to Baton Rouge in a top ten matchup against #10 LSU. Saban suffered his second loss of the season, losing 32–31 in overtime. Alabama bounced back with a close win over #11 Ole Miss 30–24. The next week, Alabama shutout Austin Peay 34–0. In the Iron Bowl, the Tide defeated Auburn 49–27. The win secured Saban his fifteenth consecutive ten-win season, a new NCAA record. Alabama finished the regular season 10-2 and was selected to play #9 Kansas State in the Sugar Bowl. In the first meeting between the two schools, Alabama won 45–20. The Tide finished the season 11–2.

In Saban's 17th and final season, Alabama started the year ranked #4 in the preseason AP poll and #3 in the coaches poll. In the season opener, Alabama defeated Middle Tennessee 56–7. The following week, the Tide hosted #11 Texas in the Allstate Crossbar Classic losing 34–24. The loss snapped a 57-game winning streak against non conference opponents in the regular season. The next week Alabama travelled to Tampa, FL to play South Florida. The Tide struggled but won 17–3. Alabama opened up conference play with a 24–10 win over #15 Ole Miss. The next week they defeated Mississippi State 40–17 for its sixteenth consecutive win in the series. Alabama traveled to College Station, TX winning a close game over Texas A&M 26–20. On homecoming, Alabama won a close game over Arkansas 24–21. The win gave Saban his 200th on field win at Alabama. In the Third Saturday in October, Alabama avenged last season's loss against #17 Tennessee winning 34–20. Following a bye week, Alabama avenged their other regular season loss from last season defeating #14 LSU 42–28. The next week Alabama defeated Kentucky 49–21 to win the SEC Western Division title. It is Saban's 15th overall division title and 13th with Alabama. On Senior day, Alabama routed FCS opponent Chattanooga 66–10. The win gave Saban his sixteenth straight 10-win season. In the Iron Bowl, quarterback Jalen Milroe on 4th and goal threw a 31-yard touchdown pass with 32 seconds left to defeat Auburn 27–24. The win made Saban the first Alabama coach since Bear Bryant in 1981 to defeat Auburn four years in a row. The Tide finished the regular season 11–1. In the SEC Championship, Alabama defeated #1 Georgia 27–24, snapping Georgia's 29 game win streak. The win secured Alabama its 30th SEC Championship. The win gave Saban his eleventh SEC title and ninth with Alabama. The following day, Alabama was selected for the College Football Playoff for the eighth time. They were selected as the #4 seed and lost to #1 seed Michigan in the Rose Bowl.

Season	Seed	Opponent	Round	Result
2014	1	Ohio State Buckeyes	Semifinals – Sugar Bowl	L 42–35
2015	2	Michigan State Spartans	Semifinals – Cotton Bowl Classic	W 38–0
2015	2	Clemson Tigers	Finals – College Football Playoff National Championship	W 45–40
2016	1	Washington Huskies	Semifinals – Peach Bowl	W 24–7
2016	1	Clemson Tigers	Finals – College Football Playoff National Championship	L 35–31
2017	4	Clemson Tigers	Semifinals – Sugar Bowl	W 24–6
2017	4	Georgia Bulldogs	Finals – College Football Playoff National Championship	W 26–23
2018	1	Oklahoma Sooners	Semifinals – Orange Bowl	W 45–34
2018	1	Clemson Tigers	Finals – College Football Playoff National Championship	L 44–16
2020	1	Notre Dame Fighting Irish	Semifinals – Rose Bowl	W 31–14
2020	1	Ohio State Buckeyes	Finals – College Football Playoff National Championship	W 52–24
2021	1	Cincinnati Bearcats	Semifinals – Cotton Bowl Classic	W 27–6
2021	1	Georgia Bulldogs	Finals – College Football Playoff National Championship	L 33–18
2023	4	Michigan Wolverines	Semifinals – Rose Bowl	L 27–20
Total Playoff Record:				9–5
