= Archie Wade =

American professor and civil rights figure

- Born: October 2, 1939; Big Cove, Alabama, U.S.
- Died: January 13, 2025 (aged 85); U.S.
- Education: Stillman College; West Virginia University; University of Alabama
- Occupations: Professor, athlete
- Known for: First Black faculty member at the University of Alabama
- Spouse: Jacqueline Wade
- Children: 5

Archie Wade (October 2, 1939 – January 13, 2025) was an African-American professor and athlete who became the first Black faculty member at the University of Alabama. Appointed in 1970, his hiring was a milestone in the university's integration, occurring amid broader efforts to diversify higher education in the United States. Wade was a longtime faculty member in the university's kinesiology department and was later recognized for his contributions with the naming of Wade Hall in his honor.

== Early life and education ==
Wade was born in Big Cove, Alabama, and raised in Tuscaloosa, Alabama. He was an accomplished athlete in high school and attended Stillman College on an athletic scholarship, competing in baseball, tennis, and basketball. Wade earned his master's in physical education from West Virginia University, partially funded by a Ford Foundation grant. During this period, he worked at Stillman as an assistant coach in basketball and baseball, while also serving as an instructor.

== Athletic and coaching career ==
While earning his master's degree, Wade coached basketball and baseball at Stillman College and worked as an instructor. In 1964, he joined the University of Alabama as an assistant coach. The following year, he signed with the St. Louis Cardinals organization and played in their minor league system from 1965 to 1967. During this time, he played for the St. Petersburg Cardinals and took part in a 29-inning game in 1966, which was the longest professional baseball game recorded at the time.

After retiring from professional baseball in 1967, Wade returned to coaching at Stillman, where he remained until 1969.

== Academic career ==
In 1970, Wade was hired by the University of Alabama as a faculty member in what is now the Department of Kinesiology, making him the institution's first Black professor. His appointment came during a period of racial tension, and he faced opposition from segments of the university community. Over time, he became a respected educator and mentor. He played a role in integrating the university's athletic programs. He assisted legendary football coach Paul "Bear" Bryant in recruiting Black players to the university's football team. His work expanded opportunities for Black student-athletes across the university.

Wade earned an Ed.D. in 1974 from the University of Alabama. He remained on the faculty until his retirement in 2000. In 2021, the university renamed the kinesiology department's main building Wade Hall in recognition of his contributions.

== Personal life ==
Wade was married to Jacqueline Wade, and they had five children. He died on January 13, 2025, at the age of 85.
