= Arthur Simmons (cricketer) =

Australian cricketer

Personal information
- Born: 13 November 1909; Croydon, New South Wales, Australia
- Died: 28 February 1990 (aged 80); Mirrabooka, New South Wales, Australia
- Source: ESPNcricinfo, 1 February 2017

Arthur Simmons (13 November 1909 – 28 February 1990) was an Australian cricketer. He played two first-class matches for New South Wales in 1934/35. He also played for Western Suburbs District Cricket Club and Marrickville Cricket Club He was also a diver, and captain of a ship, in the Royal Australian Navy.

== See also ==
- List of New South Wales representative cricketers
