= Alabama State Hornets football =

College football program of Alabama State University

2026 Alabama State Hornets football team
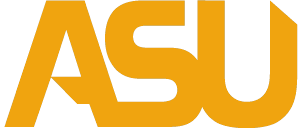
- First season: 1901; 125 years ago
- Athletic director: Jason Cable
- Head coach: Eddie Robinson Jr. 5th season, 30–16 (.652)
- Location: Montgomery, Alabama
- Stadium: ASU Stadium (capacity: 26,500)
- NCAA division: Division I FCS
- Conference: SWAC
- Division: East
- Colors: Black and old gold
- All-time record: 542–507–36 (.516)
- Bowl record: 1–0 (1.000)

Black college national championships
- 1991

Conference championships
- SIAC: 1935, 1939, 1965, 1966 SWAC: 1991, 2004

Division championships
- SWAC East: 2000, 2001, 2003, 2004, 2010, 2011, 2012, 2025
- Rivalries: Alabama A&M Bulldogs (rivalry); Tuskegee Golden Tigers
- Fight song: Hail Alabama
- Marching band: Mighty Marching Hornets
- Website: bamastatesports.com

The Alabama State Hornets are the college football team representing the Alabama State University. The Hornets play in NCAA Division I Football Championship Subdivision (FCS) as a member of the Southwestern Athletic Conference (SWAC).

ASU Stadium serves as the facility for Alabama State football games and practices. The 120-yard field turf playing field provides training to ASU football in all weather conditions. In June 2011, construction on the Houston Markham Football Complex was completed. The two-story, 30,000-square-foot facility serves as the new home of the football program.

== Conference affiliations ==
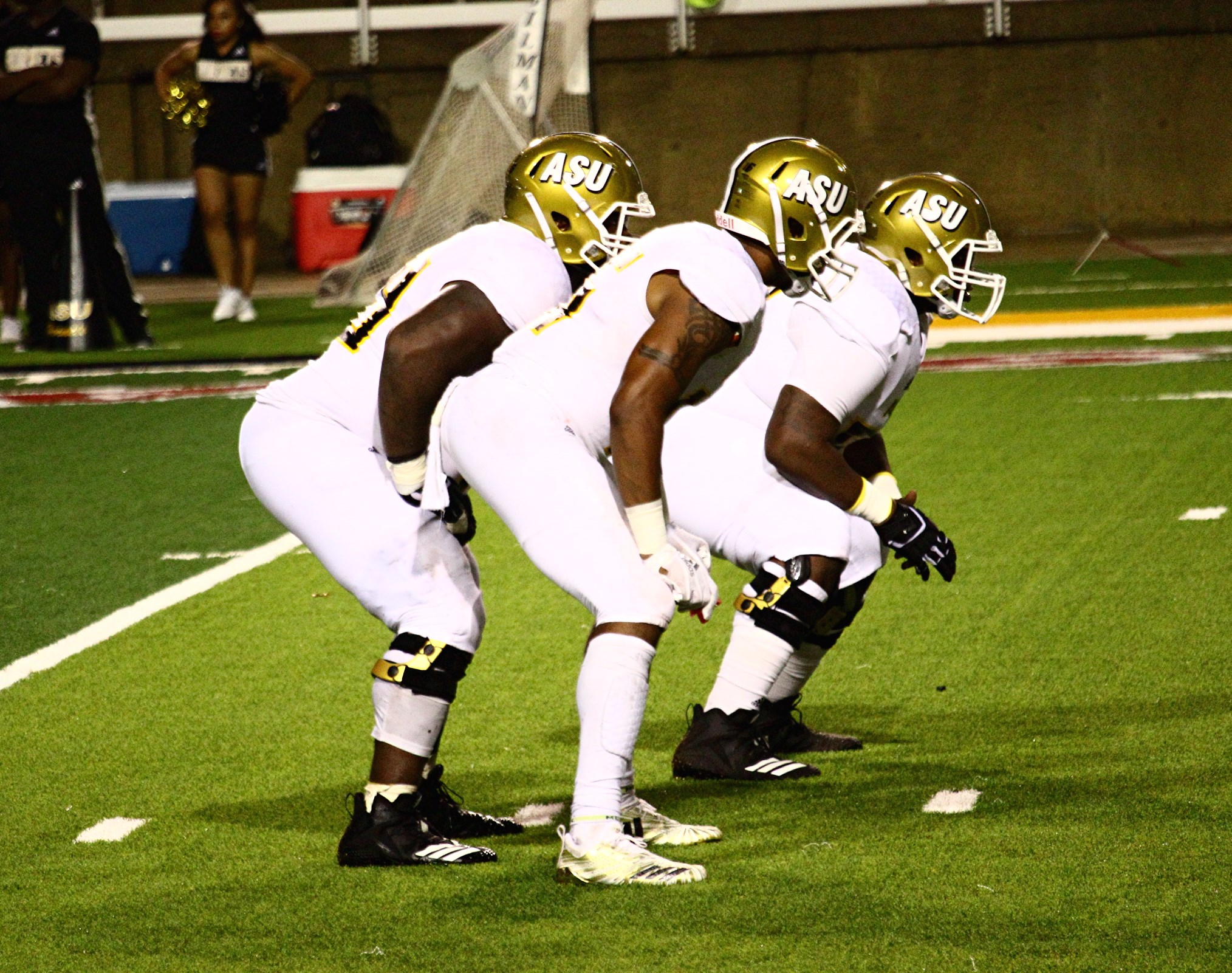
Hornets football players during a game in 2018

- Independent (1901–1912)
- Southern Intercollegiate Athletic Conference (1913–1975)
- NCAA Division II independent (1976–1981)
- Southwestern Athletic Conference (1982–present)

== Championships ==
=== National ===
Alabama State has won one national championship.

Year	Coach	Championship	Record
1991	Houston Markham	Black College National Champions	11–0–1

=== Conference ===
Alabama State has won six conference championships.

Year	Coach	Conference	Record
1935	Rufus A. Lewis	Southern Intercollegiate Athletic Conference	9–1–1
1939	Rufus A. Lewis	Southern Intercollegiate Athletic Conference	6–2–2
1965	Whitney L. Van Cleve	Southern Intercollegiate Athletic Conference, Section B	6–4
1966	Whitney L. Van Cleve	Southern Intercollegiate Athletic Conference, Section B	8–2
1991	Houston Markham	Southwestern Athletic Conference	11–0–1
2004	Charles Coe	Southwestern Athletic Conference	10–2
Total Conference Championships:			6

== Rivalries ==
The Magic City Classic takes place annually between the Hornets and the Alabama A&M Bulldogs in Birmingham, Alabama.

The Turkey Day Classic is an annual event played yearly on Thanksgiving between ASU and another opponent, most recently Prairie View A&M in 2019 and has been played almost consecutively since 1924, except for 2020 due to the COVID-19 pandemic.

== Alumni in the NFL ==
Over 20 Alabama State alumni have played in the NFL, including:

- Reggie Barlow
- Keenan Issac
- Brad Baxter
- Earl Cochran
- Michael Coe
- Isaiah Crowell
- Tytus Howard
- Johnny Huggins
- Tarvaris Jackson
- Greg Jenkins
- Bill Johnson
- Terren Jones
- Zefross Moss
- Eddie Robinson
- Tyrone Rogers
- Ricky Smith
- Jylan Ware

== Head coaches ==
Name	Seasons	Record	Win pct.
Theodore Bradford	1902–1904	0–2	.000
J. A. Welton	1905–1908	4–5–1	.444
John Hope	1909–1916	17–6–1	.739
Professor Kilpatrick	1917–1920	1–3–1	.250
Ralph Harris	1921–1925	21–13–3	.618
Bertrand C. Jacobs	1926–1928	16–10–3	.615
Gaston F. Lewis	1929–1933	31–13–4	.705
Rufus A. Lewis	1934–1942	42–32–9	.568
John Brown	1943, 1945–1948	10–24–1	.249
Hubert Lockhart & E. B. Campbell^{a}	1944	0–7	.000
James H. Dixon	1949–1951	5–20–3	.179
Arthur E. Simmons	1952–1961	43–40–3	.500
C. E. Anderson	1962	0–8	.000
Marino Casem	1963	2–8	.200
Whitney L. Van Cleve	1964–1968	35–14–1	.710
Henry Holbert	1969–1972	21–21	.500
Willie Parker	1973–1976, 1984, 1986	16–38	.296
George James Jr.	1976–1983	43–39–2	0.524
Ron Mitchell (interim)	1985	3–8	0.273
Houston Markham	1987–1997	65–50–4	.546
Ron Dickerson	1998–1999	7–15	.318
L. C. Cole	2000–2002	20–15	.571
Charles Coe	2003–2006	29–18	.617
Reggie Barlow	2006–2014	49–42	.538
Brian Jenkins	2015–2017	10–17	.370
Donald Hill-Eley	2017–2021	20–21	.488
Travis Pearson (interim)	2021	2–2	.500
Eddie Robinson Jr.	2022–present	36–20	.643

== Future non-conference opponents ==
Announced schedules as of November 20, 2026

2026	2027	2028
vs Southern; Birmingham, AL	vs Morgan State (Atlanta, GA); MEAC/SWAC Challenge	at South Alabama
Lane College		
at Troy		
Tuskegee (Turkey Day Classic)		

== Notes ==
^a At an unknown point in the 1944 season, Hubert Lockhart was replaced by E. B. Campbell. Both coaches share credit for the 1944 season.
