= Whitney L. Van Cleve =

American football coach (1922–1997)

Biographical details
- Born: April 6, 1922; Kokomo, Indiana, U.S.
- Died: January 21, 1997 (aged 74); Montgomery, Alabama, U.S.

Playing career
- 1940–1941: Tuskegee
- 1946–1947: Tuskegee

Coaching career (HC unless noted)
- c. 1950: Grambling State (assistant)
- 1955–1963: Tuskegee
- 1964–1968: Alabama State
- 1969–1973: Hampton
- 1977–1979: Albany State

Head coaching record
- Overall: 92–110–10

Accomplishments and honors

Championships
- 2 SIAC (1965–1966)

Whitney L. Van Cleve (April 6, 1922 – January 21, 1997) was an American college football coach. He served as the head football coach at Tuskegee University from 1955 to 1963, Alabama State University from 1964 to 1968, Hampton University from 1969 to 1973, and Albany State University from 1977 to 1979, compiling career head coaching record of 92–110–10.

== Coaching career ==
Van Cleve began his coaching career as an assistant at Grambling College—now known as Grambling State University—under Eddie Robinson.

=== Tuskegee ===
Van Cleve was the ninth head football coach at Tuskegee University in Tuskegee, Alabama and he held that position for nine seasons, from 1955 until 1963. His coaching record at Tuskegee was 42–35–5.

=== Alabama State ===
Van Cleve became the 15th head coach at Alabama State University in Montgomery, Alabama starting the 1964 season, and he remained there for the next five seasons. He posted a record of 35–14–1.

=== Hampton ===
Van Cleve was the 13th head football coach at Hampton University in Hampton, Virginia. Unlike his success at Alabama State, Van Cleve posted a record of 3–44–2.

=== Albany State ===
Van Cleve coached the Albany State Golden Rams football team from 1977 to 1979 and compiled a record of 12–17–2.

== Head coaching record ==
Year	Team	Overall	Conference	Standing	Bowl/playoffs
Tuskegee Golden Tigers (Southern Intercollegiate Athletic Conference) (1955–1963)
1955	Tuskegee	2–6–2	1–5–2	11th	
1956	Tuskegee	6–3	5–2	6th	
1957	Tuskegee	4–4	4–2	7th	
1958	Tuskegee	6–3–1	5–2–1	4th	
1959	Tuskegee	4–4–1	2–4–1	10th	
1960	Tuskegee	7–2	5–2	6th	
1961	Tuskegee	4–4–1	4–1–1	7th	
1962	Tuskegee	4–5	3–3	T–11th	
1963	Tuskegee	5–4			
Tuskegee:		42–35–5			
Alabama State Hornets (Southern Intercollegiate Athletic Conference) (1964–1968)
1964	Alabama State	4–6			
1965	Alabama State	6–4		1st	
1966	Alabama State	8–2		1st	
1967	Alabama State	9–1			
1968	Alabama State	8–1–1	4–1–1	2nd (Division II)	
Alabama State:		35–14–1			
Hampton Pirates (Central Intercollegiate Athletic Association) (1969–1973)
1969	Hampton	0–9	0–7	17th	
1970	Hampton	0–9	0–5	9th (Northern)	
1971	Hampton	1–9	1–6	5th (Northern)	
1972	Hampton	1–10	1–4	5th (Northern)	
1973	Hampton	1–7–2	1–5–1	T–9th	
Hampton:		3–44–2			
Albany State Golden Rams (Southern Intercollegiate Athletic Conference) (1977–1979)
1977	Albany State	7–3	2–3	T–3rd (Division I)	
1978	Albany State	4–5–1	2–3		
1979	Albany State	1–9–1	0–4		
Albany State:		12–17–2	4–10		
Total:		92–110–10			
National championship Conference title Conference division title or championship game berth
