= Henry Holbert =

American football player and coach (1927–1995)

Biographical details
- Born: May 7, 1927
- Died: December 1, 1995 (aged 68); Montgomery, Alabama, U.S.

Playing career
- c. 1944: Tennessee State
- Position: Tight end

Coaching career (HC unless noted)
- c. 1949–1950: Druid HS (AL)
- c. 1951–1961: Prentiss Junior College
- 1963: Tuskegee (assistant)
- 1964–1968: Alabama State (assistant)
- 1969–1972: Alabama State
- 1973–1991: Tuskegee (assistant)

Head coaching record
- Overall: 21–20 (college)

Henry Holbert Jr. (May 7, 1927 – December 1, 1995) was an American football tight end and coach. He served as the head coach for the Alabama State Hornets from 1969 to 1972, in addition to many years as an assistant.

Holbert attended college at Tennessee State, playing track and field and football. He played tight end in football, graduating in c. 1944. Shortly after graduating, Holbert started a coaching career in c. 1949, with Druid High School. After two years there he left for the head coach position at Prentiss Junior College, where he would coach between 10 and 12 years. (Note: The Huntsville Mirror said in 1964 that he "served Prentiss Junior College, Miss., for 12 years." The Pittsburgh Courier said in 1969 that he was there for ten years.) In 1963, Holbert accepted a position as an assistant for Tuskegee University. He spent one year there before leaving for Alabama State University. He served as an assistant coach from 1964 to 1968, until being promoted to head coach in 1969. He served as head coach for three seasons, compiling a record of 21–20, before being demoted in 1973. He was replaced by Willie Parker, and then resigned from the school rather than accept an assistant position. After leaving Alabama State, he accepted an assistant position at Tuskegee University, where he would serve various roles (including offensive coordinator) until retiring in 1992. He died on December 1, 1995, at the age of 68.
