= Arthur E. Simmons (American football) =

American football coach

Biographical details
- Education: Tennessee Agricultural & Industrial State College; Indiana University Bloomington

Playing career
- 1944–1947: Tennessee A&I

Coaching career (HC unless noted)
- 1948–1949: Tennessee A&I (assistant)
- 1950–1951: Alabama State (assistant)
- 1952–1961: Alabama State

Head coaching record
- Overall: 46–37–3 (college football)

Arthur E. Simmons was an American college football coach. He served as the head football coach at Alabama State College—now known as Alabama State University—from 1952 to 1961, compiling a record of 46–37–3. He previously coached for Tennessee A&I. He played college football for Tennessee A&I.

== Head coaching record ==
Year	Team	Overall	Conference	Standing	Bowl/playoffs
Alabama State Hornets (Southern Intercollegiate Athletic Conference) (1952–1961)
1952	Alabama State	4–5	3–4	10th	
1953	Alabama State	5–4	3–4	11th	
1954	Alabama State	6–3	4–3	8th	
1955	Alabama State	7–2	6–2	5th	
1956	Alabama State	4–4–1	3–4–1	10th	
1957	Alabama State	4–5	4–4	8th	
1958	Alabama State	6–2	6–1	T–2nd	
1959	Alabama State	4–2–2	4–2–1	5th	
1960	Alabama State	5–3	3–3	7th	
1961	Alabama State	1–7	1–5	T–13th	
Alabama State:		46–37–3	37–32–2		
Total:		46–37–3			
