= New South Wales cricket team in New Zealand in 1893–94 =

New South Wales cricket team

New South Wales tour of New Zealand 1893/94
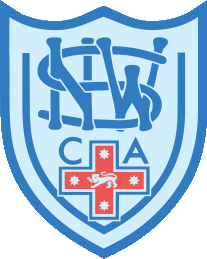
- Dates: January – February 1894
- Cricket format: First-class
- Matches: 7
- Most runs: Alick Mackenzie (296)
- Most wickets: Sydney Austin (52)

The New South Wales cricket team toured New Zealand from January to February 1894 and played seven first-class matches and one minor match. The tour is notable for the fact that the game against New Zealand was New Zealand's first first-class match. The tour was New South Wales' second of New Zealand after a tour in 1890. Like the previous tour it was privately organised by Coleman Davis and not officially sanctioned by the New South Wales Cricket Association. Despite this, given the touring party consisted of leading players from Sydney clubs the team is considered to have been a representative quality side and the matches played on tour to have been official New South Wales first-class games.

== Team ==
The following players were selected for the tour:

Name	Club	Age
J.J. Davis (Captain)	Warwick	34
S.W. Austin	Randwick	27
O.W. Cowley	Redfern	25
J.W. Gould	East Sydney	21
A.C.K. Mackenzie	Paddington	23
D.L. Miller	Lithgow	23
L.D. Moore	Maitland	22
E.G. Noble	Paddington	28
M.A. Noble	Paddington	20
J. Searle	East Sydney	32
S.R. Walford	Parramatta	34

New South Wales XI in New Zealand 1893/94

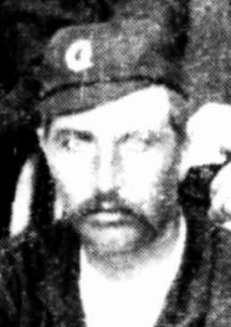
D. L. Miller

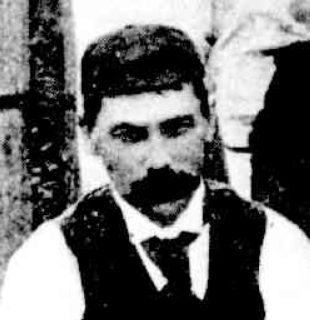
J. Searle

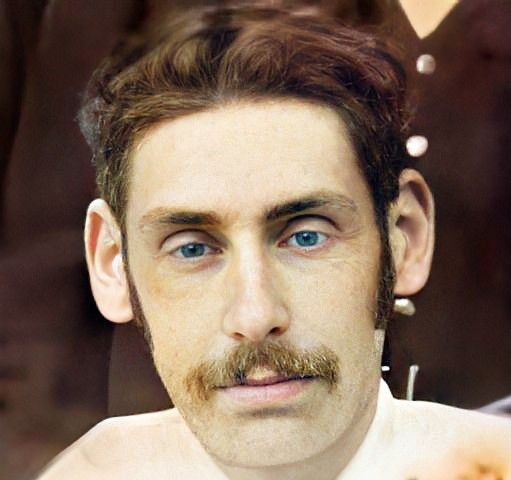
J. J. Davis

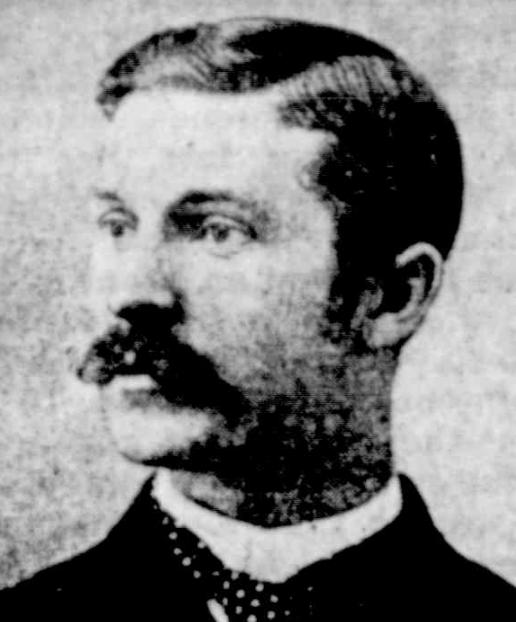
S. R. Walford

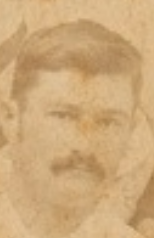
E. G. Noble

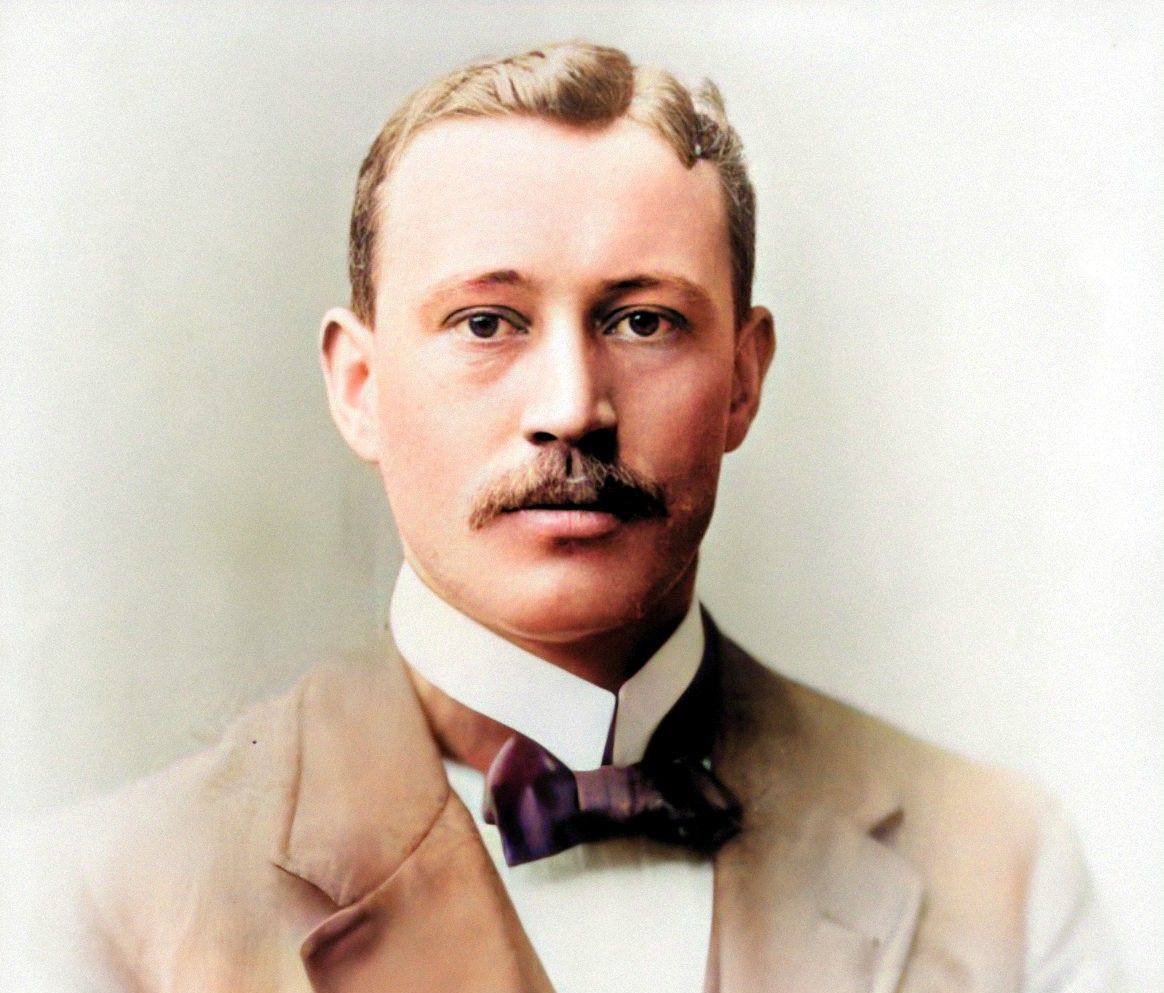
A. C. K. Mackenzie

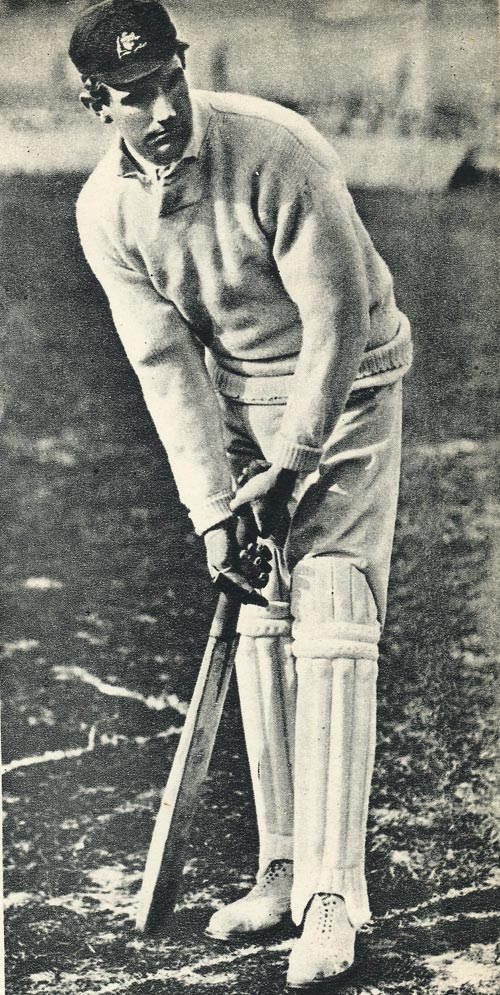
M. A. Noble

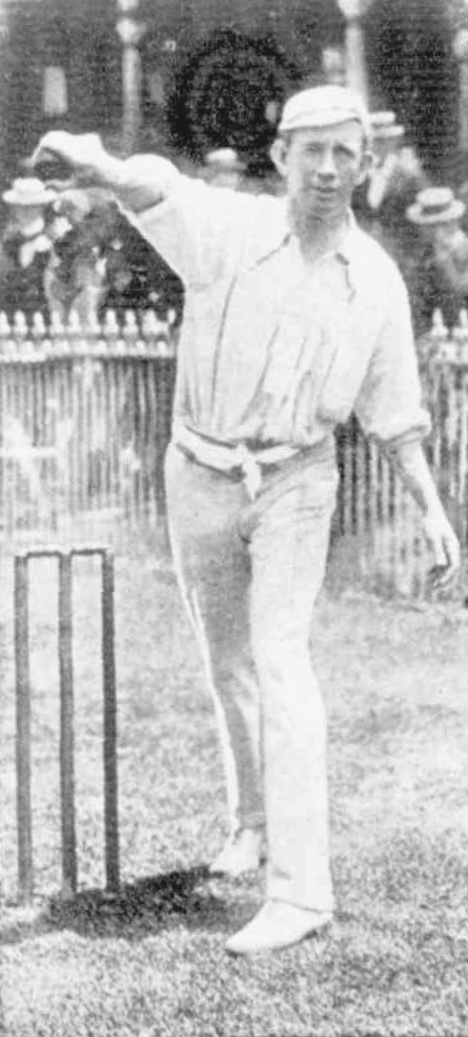
J. Gould

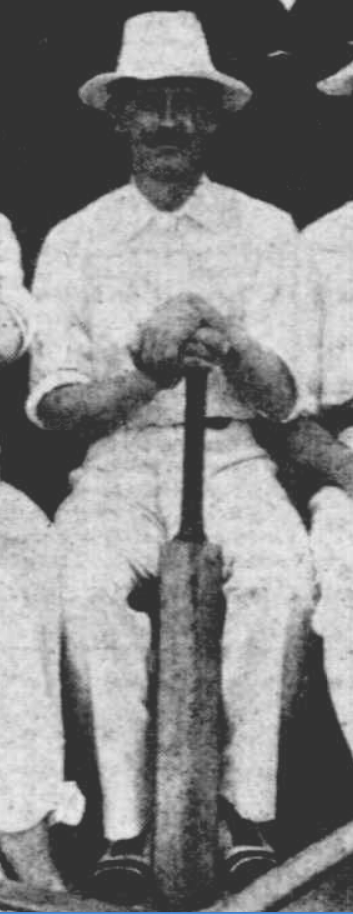
S. W. Austin

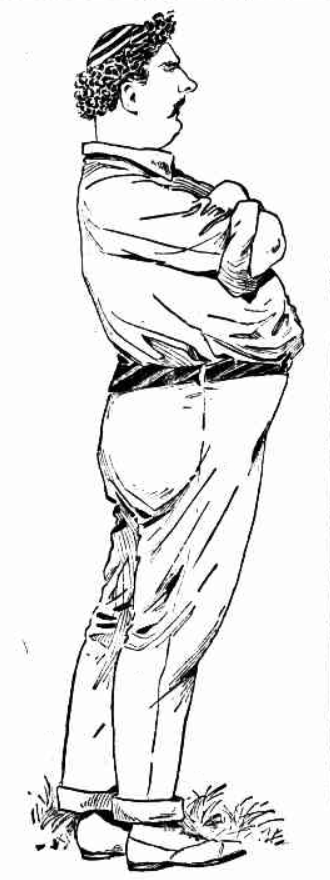
O. W. Cowley

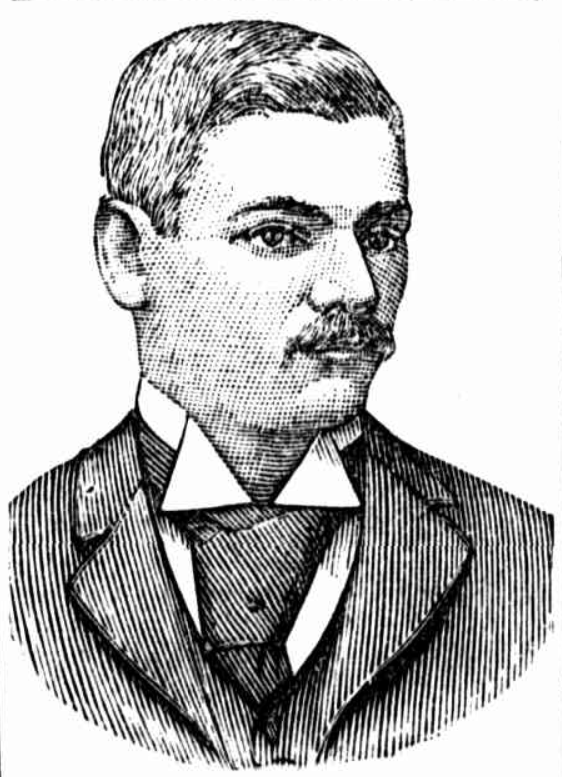
L. D. Moore

== Tour ==
=== First-class matches ===
Date	Opponent	Venue	Result	Notes
18–20 Jan 1894	Auckland	Auckland Domain, Auckland	NSW won by 9 wickets.	3 day game; no play on day 1
24–25 Jan 1894	Hawke's Bay	Recreation Ground, Napier	NSW won by an innings and 13 runs.	2 day game
27–29 Jan 1894	Wellington	Basin Reserve, Wellington	Match drawn	2 day game
1–5 Feb 1894	Canterbury	Lancaster Park, Christchurch	Canterbury won by an innings and 7 runs	4 day game
10–13 Feb 1894	Otago	Carisbrook, Dunedin	Match drawn	3 day game
15–17 Feb 1894	New Zealand	Lancaster Park, Christchurch	NSW won by 160 runs	3 day game; First time New Zealand played a first-class match
19–21 Feb 1894	North Island	Basin Reserve, Wellington	NSW won by 123 runs	3 day game

=== Minor matches ===
Date	Opponent	Venue	Result
7–8 Feb 1894	South Canterbury XV	South Canterbury Athletic Club Ground, Timaru	Match Drawn
13–14 Feb 1894	Oamaru XV	New Cricket Ground, Oamaru	Match cancelled

== Match summaries ==
=== New South Wales vs Auckland ===
19-20 January 1894
Scorecard

New South Wales	v	Auckland
185 (75.3 overs); L.D. Moore 68; R. Neill 5/70 (28.3 overs)		93 (33 overs); R.J. Yates 23; S.W. Austin 5/45 (17 overs)
1/14 (4 overs); O.W. Cowley 10*; R. Neill 1/6 (2 overs)		102 (26 overs); J.A Kallendar 32; J. Gould 4/49 (13 overs)

New South Wales won by 9 wickets
Auckland Domain, Auckland
Umpires: J.C. Davis, McPherson

- New South Wales enforced the follow-on

=== New South Wales vs Hawke's Bay ===
24-25 January 1894
Scorecard

Hawke's Bay	v	New South Wales
112 (46.5 overs); G. White 24*; J. Gould 4/30 (13 overs)		176 (83.4 overs); O.W. Cowley 48; A.M. Beale 6/53 (35 overs)
51 (36 overs); H.B. Lusk 23; S.W. Austin 8/14 (19 overs)

New South Wales won by an innings and 13 runs
Recreation Ground, Napier
Umpires: C.H. Edwards, Jacobs and W.J. Salmon

=== New South Wales vs Wellington ===
27-29 January 1894
Scorecard

New South Wales	v	Wellington
209 (70 overs); J. Searle 44*; F.L. Ashbolt 6/52 (23 overs)		180 (76.3 overs); R.V. Blacklock 65; S.W. Austin 5/47 (24.4 overs)
3/181 dec. (65 overs); A.C.K. Mackenzie 58; E.F. Upham 2/65 (23 overs)		0/44 (11 overs); C.S. Cross 28*

Match Drawn
Basin Reserve, Wellington
Umpires: J.C. Davis, E.M. Knapp

- 2-day match

=== New South Wales vs Canterbury ===
1-5 February 1894
Scorecard

Canterbury	v	New South Wales
331 (134 overs); H.S. de Maus 113; J. Gould 4/69 (21 overs)		118 (72 overs); S.W. Austin 31; W. Robertson 6/72 (36 overs)
		206 (99.3 overs); A.C.K. Mackenzie 60; W.C. Pearce 3/28 (17.3 overs)

Canterbury won by an innings and 7 runs
Lancaster Park, Christchurch
Umpires: J.C. Davis

- 4-day match; Canterbury enforced the follow-on

=== New South Wales vs Otago ===
10-13 February 1894
Scorecard

Otago	v	New South Wales
264 (93.3 overs); J.C. Lawton 58; S.W. Austin 3/76 (35 overs)		199 (120.3 overs); E.G. Noble 51; J. Hope 5/36 (33 overs)
114 (57.3 overs); A.E Clarke 37; S.W. Austin 6/66 (29.3 overs)		5/75 (61.1 overs); E.G. Noble 41*; J.C. Lawton 2/24 (22 overs)

Match Drawn
Carisbrook, Dunedin
Umpires: S. Hopkinson, H. Rose

- 3-day match

=== New South Wales vs New Zealand ===
15-17 February 1894
Scorecard

New South Wales	v	New Zealand
147 (82 overs); S.W. Austin 43; W. Robertson 6/76 (35 overs)		116 (71.3 overs); H.S. de Maus 45; S.W. Austin 7/63 (36 overs)
208 (106 overs); J. Searle 45; H.S. de Maus 4/33 (14 overs)		79 (43.2 overs); A.B.M Labatt 17; S.W. Austin 6/35 (22 overs)

New South Wales won by 160 runs
Lancaster Park, Christchurch
Umpires: T.D. Condell, J.C. Davis, A.M. Ollivier

- 3-day match

=== New South Wales vs North Island ===
19-21 February 1894
Scorecard

New South Wales	v	North Island
220 (66 overs); O.W. Cowley 38; G. Mills 7/70 (25 overs)		184 (92.1 overs); I. Mills 40; O.W. Cowley 3/14 (11.1 overs)
196 (72.4 overs); O.W. Cowley 55; E.F. Upham 6/57 (27.4 overs)		109 (45.2 overs); I. Mills 38; D.L. Miller 4/25 (12.2 overs)

New South Wales won by 123 runs
Basin Reserve, Wellington
Umpires: J.C. Davis, J. Searle

- 3-day match

== Statistics (first-class matches) ==
=== Batting ===
Player	Matches	Innings	Not outs	Runs	Highest score	Average	100s	50s	Catches	Stumpings
S.W. Austin	7	10	0	163	43	16.30	–	–	1	–
O.W. Cowley	7	12	1	266	55	24.18	–	1	5	–
J.J. Davis	7	10	3	139	25*	19.85	–	–	2	2
J.W. Gould	7	12	0	232	45	19.33	–	–	3	–
A.C.K. Mackenzie	7	13	0	296	60	22.76	–	2	5	–
D.L. Miller	7	11	2	86	18	9.55	–	–	5	–
L.D. Moore	7	12	1	254	68	23.09	–	2	4	–
E.G. Noble	7	11	2	215	51	23.88	–	1	10	–
M.A. Noble	7	10	1	93	26	10.33	–	–	3	–
J. Searle	7	13	6	186	45*	26.57	–	–	7	6
S.R. Walford	7	11	0	121	22	11.00	–	–	3	–

=== Bowling ===
Player	Matches	Balls	Maidens	Runs	Wickets	Average	Best Bowling	5 w/i	10 w/m	Strike rate	Economy rate
S.W. Austin	7	1761	86	612	52	11.76	8/14	6	1	33.8	2.08
O.W. Cowley	7	253	16	78	6	13.00	3/14	–	–	42.1	1.84
J.J. Davis	7	–	–	–	–	–	–	–	–	–	–
J.W. Gould	7	605	16	327	15	21.80	4/30	–	–	40.3	3.24
A.C.K. Mackenzie	7	–	–	–	–	–	–	–	–	–	–
D.L. Miller	7	1407	69	482	30	16.06	4/25	–	–	46.9	2.05
L.D. Moore	7	64	2	23	0	–	–	–	–	–	2.15
E.G. Noble	7	–	–	–	–	–	–	–	–	–	–
M.A. Noble	7	301	13	153	4	38.25	2/16	–	–	75.2	3.04
J. Searle	7	–	–	–	–	–	–	–	–	–	–
S.R. Walford	7	–	–	–	–	–	–	–	–	–	–
