= Alick Mackenzie =

Australian cricketer (1870–1947)

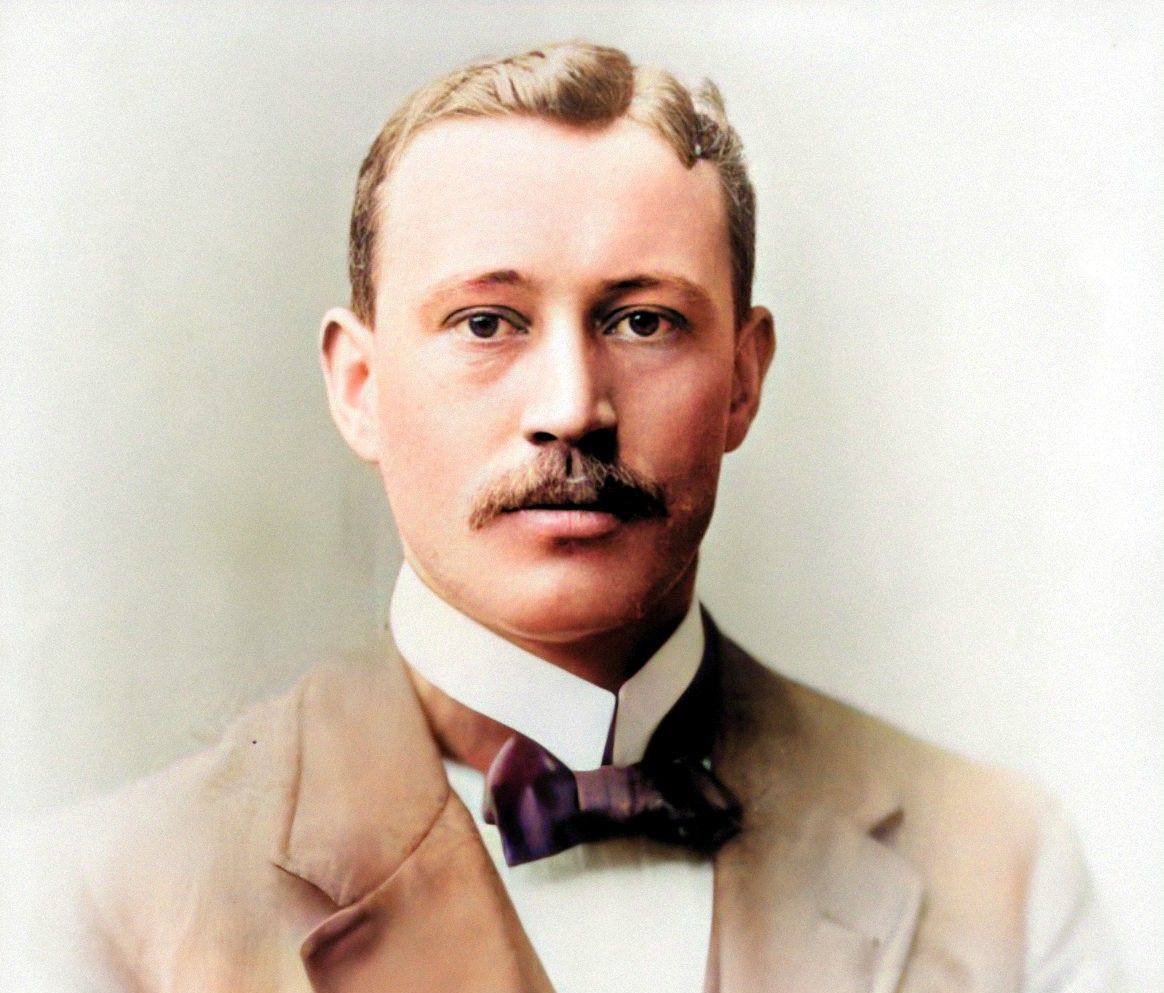

Personal information
- Full name: Alexander Cecil Knox Mackenzie
- Born: 7 August 1870; Sydney, New South Wales, Australia
- Died: 11 April 1947 (aged 76); Epping, New South Wales, Australia
- Nickname: Big Alick
- Height: 6 ft 3.5 in (1.92 m)
- Batting: Right-handed
- Role: Batsman
- Relatives: Stuart Mackenzie (grandson)

Domestic team information
- Years: Team
- 1888/89–1906/07: New South Wales
- 1898/99–1899/1900: Rest of Australia
- FC debut: 21 December 1888 New South Wales v Australian XI
- Last FC: 16 March 1907 New South Wales v Western Australia

Career statistics
Competition	First-class
Matches	48
Runs scored	2,150
Batting average	25.90
100s/50s	1/17
Top score	130
Catches/stumpings	40/–
- Source: CricInfo, 27 May 2022

Alexander Cecil Knox Mackenzie (7 August 1870 – 11 April 1947) was an Australian cricketer. He played 48 first-class matches for New South Wales and Rest of Australia between seasons 1888/89 and 1906/07. In the Sydney grade competition he is most well known for having played for the Paddington and Waverley clubs.

== Early life ==
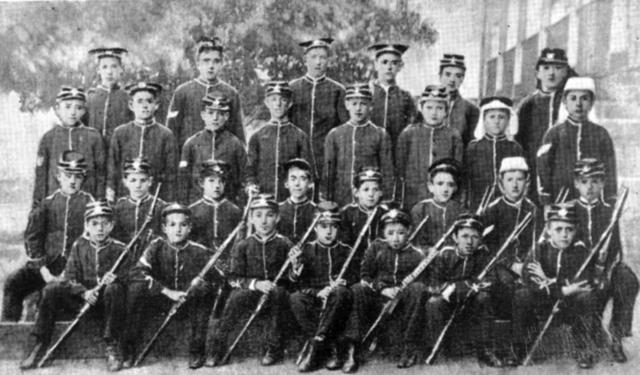
Photograph of the Sydney Boys High School Cadet Corps in 1884. Alick Mackenzie is in the third row, first on the left.

Alick Mackenzie was the eldest child of Nicholas James and Mary Ann (née Robinson) Mackenzie, and was born on 7 August 1870 at his parents residence located at 9 Queen Street in The Rocks, Sydney. Nicholas was a prominent shopkeeper who ran a mercery business in George Street. He was a leading member of the Orange Order and held various positions in the organisation such as Grand Treasurer.

Alick first attended Crown Street Public School and was later part of the first enrolment of students to Sydney Boys High School in 1883. He represented his high school in cricket and rifle shooting.

Growing up in Paddington, Alick and his younger brothers were childhood friends of Victor Trumper, Alick's future Paddington and New South Wales teammate.

== Junior club cricket ==
Alick's first season of competitive club cricket was the 1885/86 season in which he played for the Winchester club. Despite it being his first season of cricket, he won the award for the highest batting average in the team. The following season, 1886/87 he played for the Mansfield club. In his last season of junior cricket, 1887/88, he played for the Verona cricket club, during which he made a top score of 206 not out.

== Senior club cricket ==
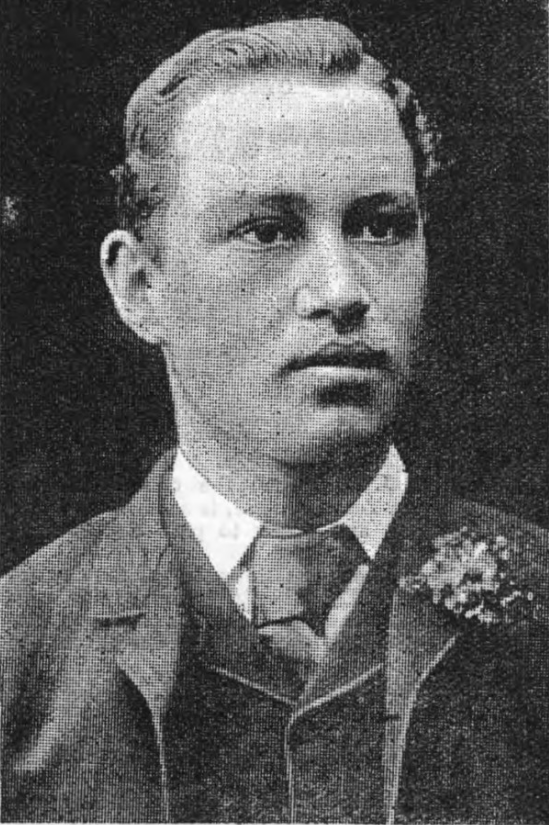
Portrait of Alick Mackenze during the time he played for the Sydney club

Alick Mackenzie joined the newly formed Sydney Cricket Club for the 1888/89 season. The club was founded by Phil Sheridan, a prominent Sydney cricket identity of the time. Future Australian test captains Monty Noble and Syd Gregory were teammates of Alick's in the Sydney team. He would play with the club for five seasons before the introduction of the electorate club system in 1893. During his time with the Sydney Cricket Club he was one of the most successful batsmen across all of the Sydney clubs and it was his performances for the club which saw him selected to make his first class debut for New South Wales in late 1888 in a game against an Australian XI. His season-by-season record for the club is as follows:

Alick Mackenzie Batting Statistics for Sydney Cricket Club
Season	Innings	Not Outs	High Score	Runs	Average
1888/89	12	3	60	309	34.3
1889/90	14	1	112	517	39.8
1890/91	8	0	120	184	23.0
1891/92	8	2	72*	232	38.7
1892/93					

== Sydney Grade Cricket ==
=== Paddington 1893/94 to 1899/1900 ===
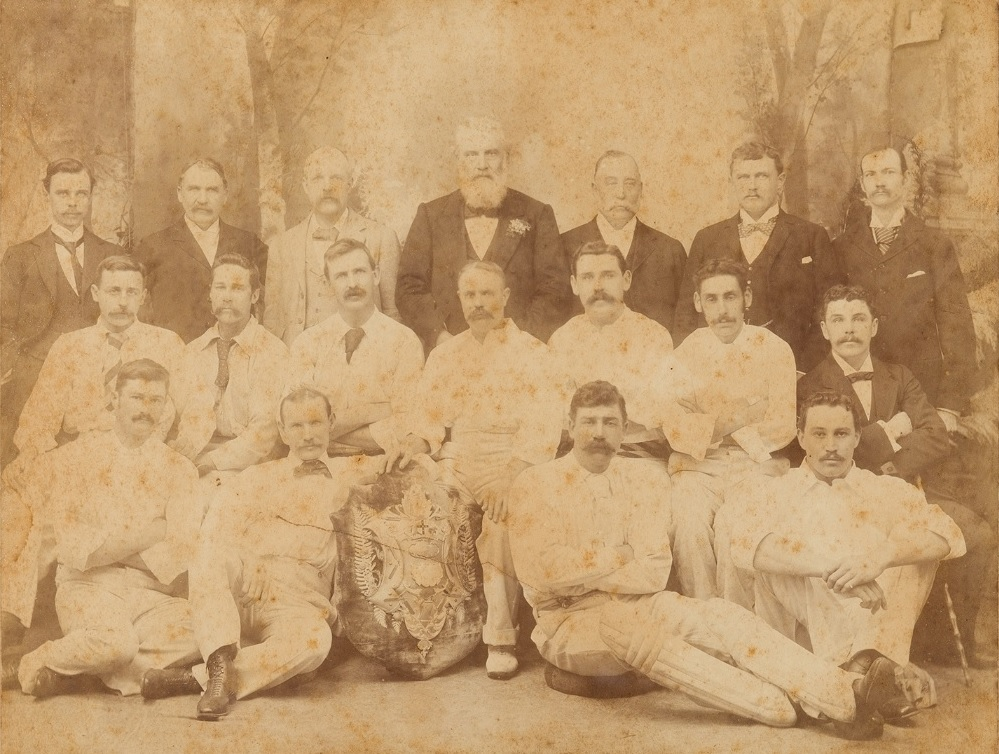
The Paddington team that won the 1894/95 first grade premiership. Alick Mackenzie is seated on the far right of the front row.

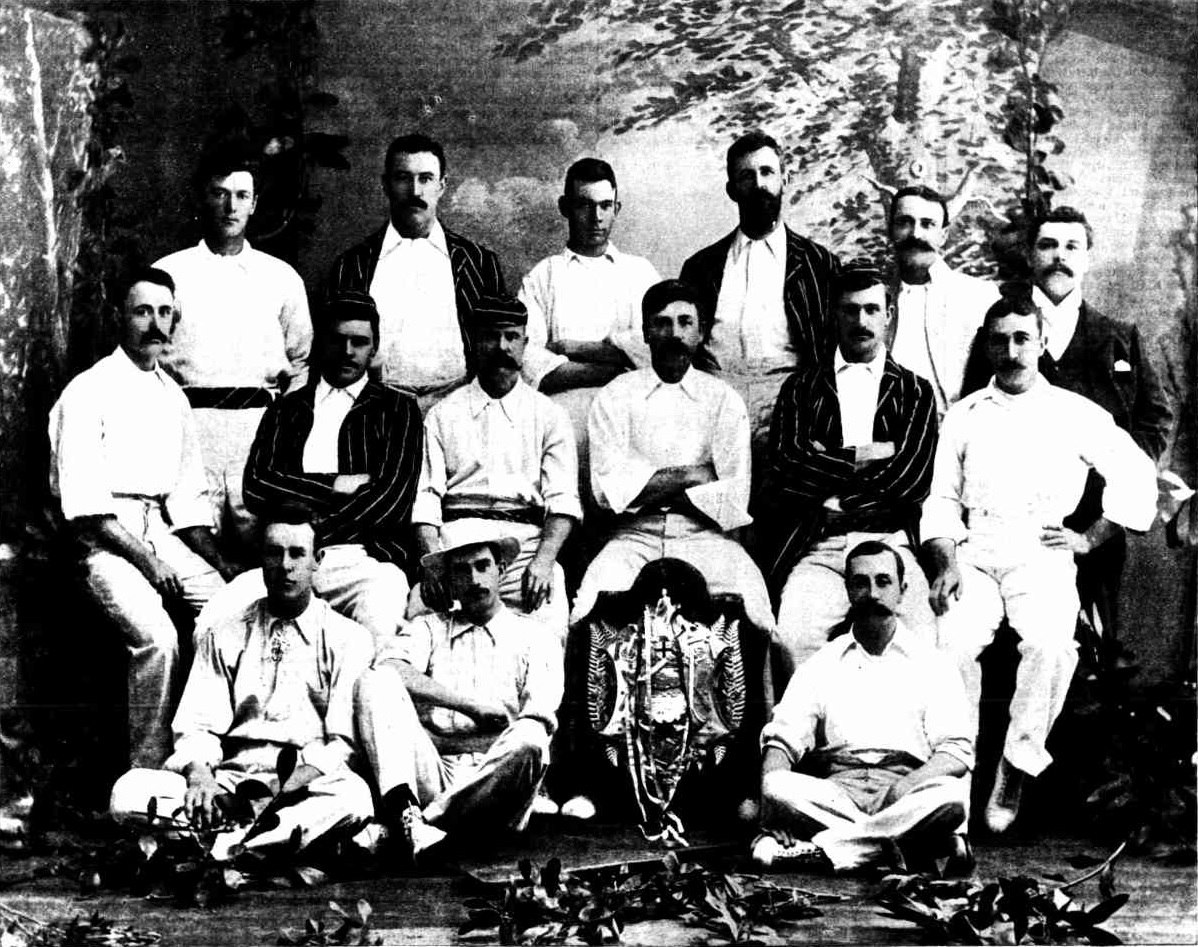
Photograph of the Paddington team that won the 1897/98 first grade premiership. Alick Mackenzie is in the back row, second from left.

When the Sydney Grade Cricket competition was formed in 1893 he played for the Paddington club due to the fact he resided in that suburb. During his time at Paddington he was a teammate of Australian Test stars Victor Trumper and Monty Noble. Two of Alick's younger brothers also played alongside him for Paddington in this period. Alick won two premierships with Paddington in seasons 1894/95 and 1897/98.

Season	Innings	Not Out	High Score	Runs	Average	Notes
1893/94	6	1	83	201	40.20	
1894/95	12	0	72	333	27.75	Won the Sydney Grade premiership (Hordern Shield)
1895/96	11	0	214	565	51.36	Leading aggregate run scorer in the competition
1896/97	10	0	105	419	41.90	
1897/98	8	0	147	409	51.13	Won the Sydney Grade premiership (Hordern Shield)
1898/99	7	0	61	253	36.14	
1899/1900	8	0	166	370	52.86	
Total	62	1	214	2550	42.50	

=== Waverley 1900/01 to 1909/10 ===
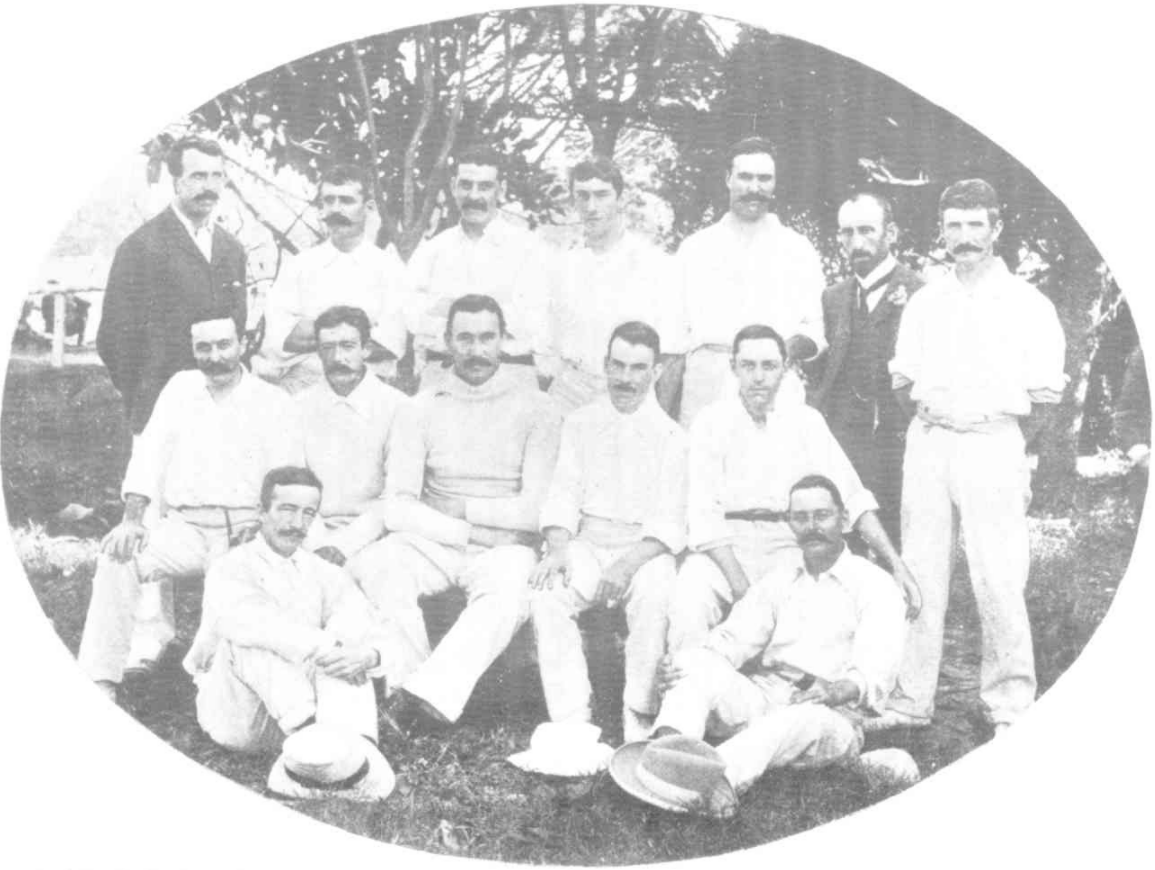
Photograph of the Waverley team that won the 1902/03 first grade premiership. Alick Mackenzie is seated in the middle row, third from left.

After the 1899/1900 season Alick moved to the Waverley club as he was now living within their residential boundaries. He would play for the Waverely club until his retirement at the conclusion of the 1909/10 season. Alick captained Waverley to a premiership in season 1902/03. This was the clubs first premiership. That same season Alick was the leading aggregate run-scorer and obtained the highest batting average in the competition. Throughout the rest of his career Alick was a consistent run-scorer for Waverley consistently averaging over 40 runs per innings.

Season	Innings	Not Out	High Score	Runs	Average	Notes
1900/01	10	0	127	322	32.20	
1901/02	9	0	79	260	28.89	
1902/03	10	0	150	626	62.60	Leading aggregate and average run scorer in the competition
1903/04	9	0	189	533	59.22	
1904/05	10	0	63	249	24.90	
1905/06	12	2	117	634	63.40	
1906/07	8	0	73	249	31.13	
1907/08	6	0	68	244	40.67	
1908/09	10	1	165	432	48.00	
1909/10	7	0	133	303	43.29	
Total	91	3	189	3852	43.77	

Alick retired from all competitive cricket at the conclusion of the 1909/10 season. In total he scored 6,275 runs in his first grade career at an average 42.39 over 155 innings with 15 centuries and 32 fifties and a highest score of 214.

== First-class cricket ==
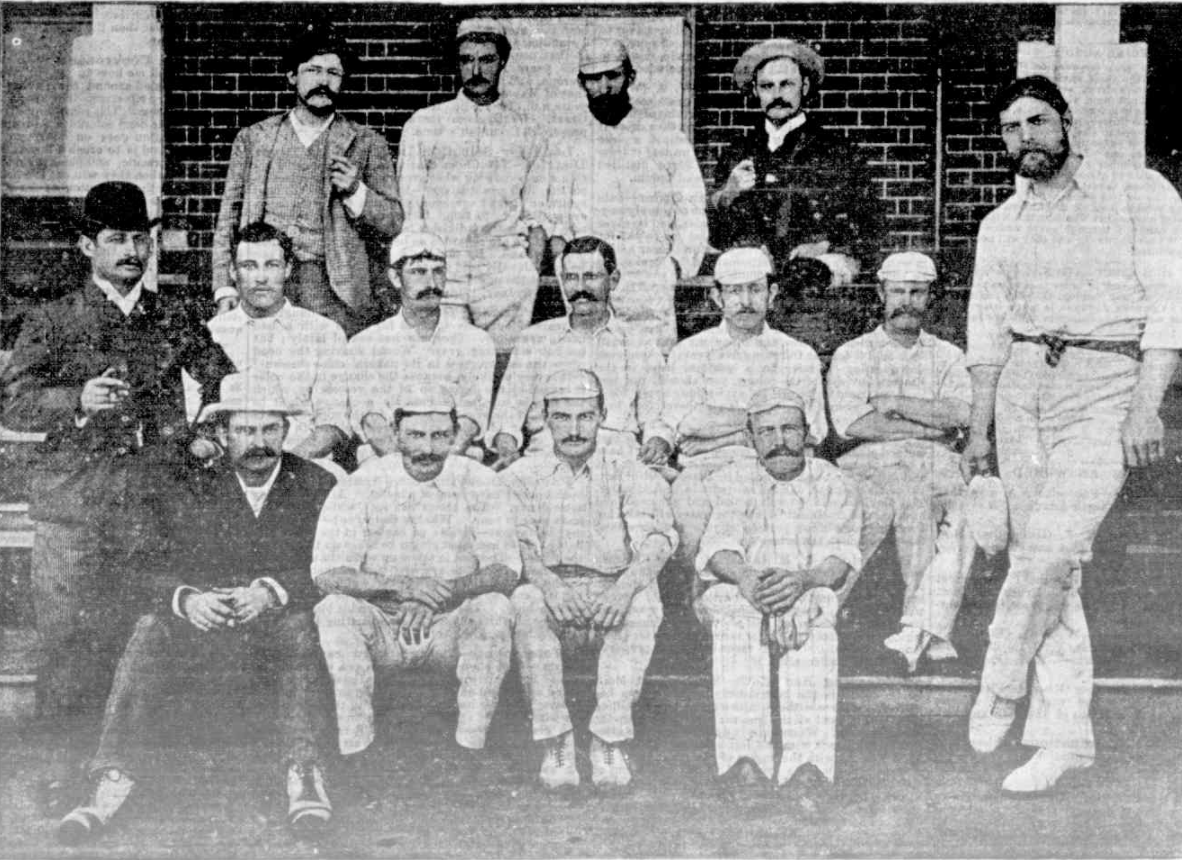
Photo of the New South Wales team that played Victoria in December 1889. Alick Mackenzie in the middle row second from left.

Alick made his first-class debut as an 18 year old in December 1888 when he was selected to play for New South Wales against an Australian XI. He performed well on debut, his score of 34 being amongst the best of the NSW batsman and made against Australia's best bowlers of the day. Alick would play for NSW on a regular basis from that point until season 1902/03. He played only one more game for NSW after that season, which came in season 1906/07 when he appeared for NSW against Western Australia in Perth.

During the 1893/94 season Alick was selected in the New South Wales team that toured New Zealand from January to February 1894. He was the leading run scorer on the tour.

The highlight of Alick's first class career came during the 1897/98 season when he scored his only first class century (130) playing for New South Wales in a match against the touring England team. In two matches against the England team that season Alick made consecutive scores of 80, 59, 130, 52 for an average of 80.25. As a result of these performances, he was generally considered to be in contention for a spot in the Australia team for the fifth test match of the 1897/98 Ashes series but ultimately didn't gain selection.

Alick retired at the conclusion of the 1909/10 season. As a reward for his services to the game he was named as manager of the Australian team that toured New Zealand from February to April 1910 and subsequently appeared for the Australian team in their match against Taranaki.

=== First-class career statistics ===
Season	Matches	Innings	Not Outs	Runs	Highest Score	100	50	Average	Notes
1888/89	1	1	0	34	34	-	-	34.00	First-class debut vs Australian XI
1889/90	1	2	0	12	8	-	-	6.00	
1890/91	-	-	-	-	-	-	-	-	
1891/92	2	4	0	26	25	-	-	6.50	
1892/93	-	-	-	-	-	-	-	-	
1893/94	10	18	0	378	60	-	2	21.00	Toured New Zealand with New South Wales
1894/95	2	4	0	68	37	-	-	17.00	
1895/96	5	9	0	376	97	-	3	41.77	
1896/97	4	7	1	126	50	-	1	21.00	
1897/98	6	12	0	506	130	1	5	41.83	Leading run scorer in NSW matches
1898/99	5	9	1	224	62*	-	2	28.00	Selected in Rest of Australia team
1899/1900	5	7	0	135	65	-	1	19.28	Selected in Rest of Australia team
1900/01	-	-	-	-	-	-	-	-	
1901/02	1	2	0	27	20	-	-	13.50	
1902/03	5	9	0	191	77	-	2	21.22	
1903/04	-	-	-	-	-	-	-	-	
1904/05	-	-	-	-	-	-	-	-	
1905/06	-	-	-	-	-	-	-	-	
1906/07	1	2	1	51	51*	-	1	51.00	
Total	48	86	2	2150	130	1	17	25.90	

== H.V. Hordern and the Googly ==
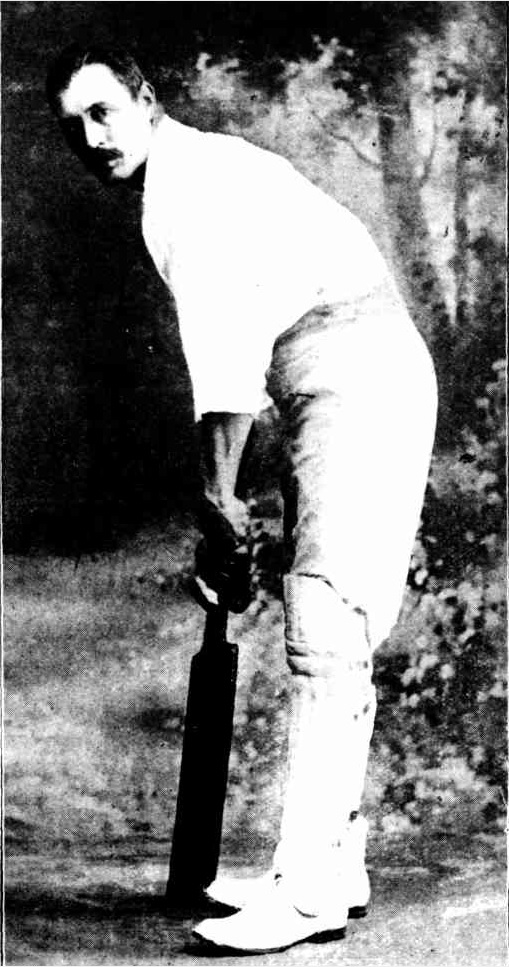
Portrait of Alick Mackenzie c.1905

Alick Mackenzie was a contemporary of H. V. Hordern who is well known as the first Australian cricketer to develop the ability to bowl the googly (wrong 'un) delivery. The googly is a delivery bowled by a leg spin bowler in a normal manner, but which turns in the opposite direction to a normal leg-break. The delivery was originally developed by English cricketer Bernard Bosanquet in the early 1900s while he was a student at Oxford University and he used it to great effect against Australia's batsman on England's tour of Australia in 1903/04. After witnessing Bosanquet bowl the googly, Hordern committed to teaching himself how to bowl it. Prior to the commencement of the 1905/06 season Hordern asked Alick to join him at the Sydney Cricket Ground so that he could practice bowling the new delivery. The first two deliveries that he bowled were full tosses and promptly hit to the boundary by Mackenzie. The third landed on the pitch, spun, beat the bat and clean bowled the batsman. It was after this occurrence that Hordern begun using the googly in first-class matches.

== Personal life ==
On 19 May 1900 Alick married Jessie Maud Phelps. They had four children.

After leaving school, Alick entered employment as a clerk with the New South Wales Department of Audit. He would remain with the department until his retirement in the 1930s.

== Life after cricket ==
After his cricket career finished in 1910, Alick took up the sport of competitive lawn bowls.
