= McGlinchey =

McGlinchey is an Irish surname. Notable people with the surname include:

- Bernard McGlinchey (1932–2013), Irish businessman and politician
- Brian McGlinchey (born 1977), retired Northern Irish football defender
- Cameron McGlinchey (born 1975), former drummer of popular Australian band Rogue Traders
- Conner McGlinchey, Australian footballer
- Dominic McGlinchey (1954–1994), Irish republican paramilitary with the Irish National Liberation Army (INLA)
- Herbert J. McGlinchey (1904–1992), Democratic member of the U.S. House of Representatives and the Pennsylvania Senate
- Kimberly McGlinchey, American politician
- Marian Price (born 1954), née Marion McGlinchey, Irish republican
- Michael McGlinchey (born 1987), footballer currently playing for Wellington Phoenix
- Mike McGlinchey (American football coach) (1944–1997), Central Connecticut State University Blue Devils and Frostburg State University Bobcats
- Mike McGlinchey (offensive lineman) (born c. 1994), for the Notre Dame Fighting Irish
- Patrick James McGlinchey (1928-2018), Irish Catholic in South Korea
- Tom McGlinchey (born 1972), Irish Gaelic football manager
- Wally McGlinchey (1864-1946), Australian cricketer

== See also ==
- McGlinchey Stafford, United States-based law firm focusing on corporate defense litigation with offices in eight cities in five states
- McGlinchy
