= George Cowper =

George Cowper may refer to:

- George Cowper (cricketer), Australian cricketer
- George Cowper, 6th Earl Cowper, British politician
- George Cowper (North Carolina politician), state legislator (North Carolina General Assembly of 1899–1900)

== See also ==
- George Clavering-Cowper, 3rd Earl Cowper, English peer
