= International cricket in 1903–04 =

International cricket season

The 1903–04 international cricket season was from September 1903 to April 1904. The season consisted of a single international tour.

== Season overview ==
International tours
Start date	Home team	Away team	Results [Matches]			
Start date	Home team	Away team	Test	ODI	FC	LA
11 December 1903	Australia	England	2–3 [5]	—	—	—

== December ==
=== England in Australia ===
The Ashes Test series
No.	Date	Home captain	Away captain	Venue	Result
Test 78	11–17 December	Monty Noble	Pelham Warner	Sydney Cricket Ground, Sydney	England by 5 wickets
Test 79	1–5 January	Monty Noble	Pelham Warner	Melbourne Cricket Ground, Melbourne	England by 185 runs
Test 80	15–20 January	Monty Noble	Pelham Warner	Adelaide Oval, Adelaide	Australia by 216 runs
Test 81	26 Feb–3 March	Monty Noble	Pelham Warner	Sydney Cricket Ground, Sydney	England by 157 runs
Test 82	5–8 March	Monty Noble	Pelham Warner	Melbourne Cricket Ground, Melbourne	Australia by 218 runs
