= International cricket in 1909 =

International cricket season

The 1909 international cricket season was from April 1909 to September 1909.

== Season overview ==
International tours
Start date	Home team	Away team	Results [Matches]			
Start date	Home team	Away team	Test	ODI	FC	LA
27 May 1909	England	Australia	1–2 [5]	—	—	—
28 June 1909	Scotland	Australia	—	—	0–0 [1]	—
17 September 1909	Philadelphia	Ireland	—	—	1–0 [1]	—

== May ==
=== Australia in England ===
The Ashes Test series
No.	Date	Home captain	Away captain	Venue	Result
Test 101	27–29 May	Archie MacLaren	Monty Noble	Edgbaston Cricket Ground, Birmingham	England by 10 wickets
Test 102	14–16 June	Archie MacLaren	Monty Noble	Lord's, London	Australia by 9 wickets
Test 103	1–3 July	Archie MacLaren	Monty Noble	Headingley Cricket Ground, Leeds	Australia by 126 runs
Test 104	26–28 July	Archie MacLaren	Monty Noble	Old Trafford Cricket Ground, Manchester	Match drawn
Test 105	9–11 August	Archie MacLaren	Monty Noble	Kennington Oval, London	Match drawn

== June ==
=== Australia in Scotland ===
First-class match
No.	Date	Home captain	Away captain	Venue	Result
Match	27–29 May	Not mentioned	Monty Noble	Raeburn Place, Edinburgh	Match drawn

== September ==
=== Ireland in North America ===
First-class match
No.	Date	Home captain	Away captain	Venue	Result
Match	17–18 September	PH Clark	Francis Browning	Merion Cricket Club Ground, Haverford	Gentlemen of Philadelphia by an innings and 168 runs
