= Jonas Davis =

Australian cricketer (1859–1911)

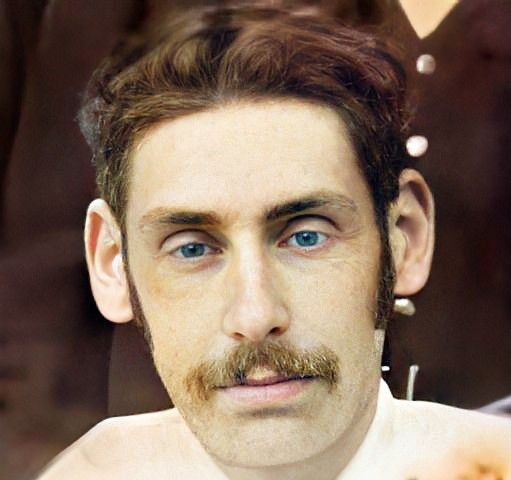

Personal information
- Born: 12 May 1859; Goulburn, New South Wales, Australia
- Died: 18 May 1911 (aged 52); Waverley, Sydney, New South Wales, Australia
- Role: Batsman, occasional wicket-keeper

Domestic team information
- Years: Team
- 1879/80–1893/94: New South Wales

Career statistics
Competition	First-class
Matches	20
Runs scored	643
Batting average	24.73
100s/50s	0/3
Top score	85
Catches/stumpings	9/2
- Source: Cricinfo, 26 December 2016

Jonas "Joe" Davis (12 May 1859 – 18 May 1911) was an Australian cricketer.

Davis played for the New South Wales XV against the Australians in 1878-79 and scored 32 in an innings victory for the New South Wales team, the Sydney Morning Herald recording that Davis "proved that the confidence placed in his powers as a batsman was justified". He subsequently played twenty first-class matches for New South Wales between 1879–80 and 1893–94.

A batsman and occasional wicket-keeper, Joe Davis' highest first-class score was for New South Wales against Ivo Bligh's XI in 1882–83, when, opening the batting, he scored 85 in the second innings out of a team total of 165. He dropped out of the New South Wales team for interstate matches after the 1887–88 season, but he returned to captain the team on tours of New Zealand, in 1889–90 and 1893–94, both tours having been organised and managed by Davis' older brother, Coleman (1857–1922).

Davis was a jeweller. He married Phoebe Davis in Sydney in February 1885.

He collapsed while playing bowls in May 1911 and died at home early the next morning, aged 52. He left a widow, a son and three daughters. He was buried in the Jewish section of Rookwood Cemetery, Sydney. He is sometimes called "Jonas J. Davis", but his probate notice refers to him as "JONAS DAVIS commonly known as Joseph Davis".
