= Sydney Walford =

Australian cricketer

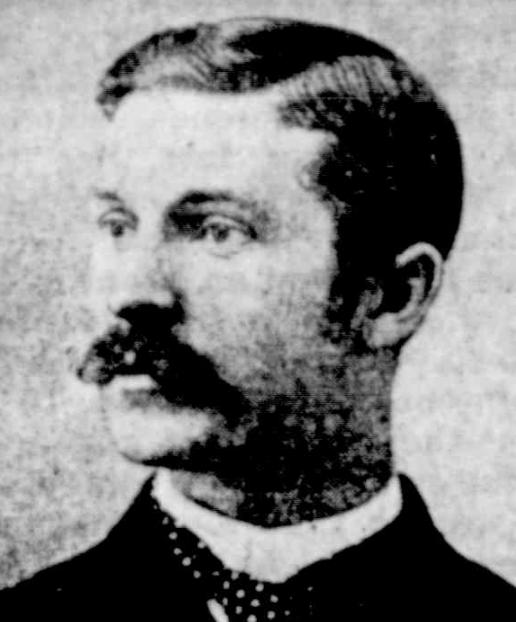

Personal information
- Full name: Sydney Rundle Walford
- Born: 19 November 1859; Darlinghurst, Colony of New South Wales
- Died: 2 July 1949 (aged 89); Woollahra, New South Wales, Australia
- Batting: Right-handed

Domestic team information
- Years: Team
- 1892 – 1896: New South Wales
- Source: ESPNcricinfo, 15 December 2015

Sydney Rundle Walford (15 November 1859 – 2 July 1949) was an Australian cricketer.

A right-handed batsman, he played 13 first-class cricket matches for New South Wales scoring 351 runs. He played all but one of his first-class matches during the two tours of New Zealand that New South Wales made in 1893–94 and 1895–96. He scored his only first-class century, 122, to help New South Wales to victory over Canterbury on their tour in 1895–96.

He and his wife Hannah, who predeceased him, had three sons and a daughter.

== See also ==
- List of New South Wales representative cricketers
