= Robbie MacDonald =

Australian cricketer

Personal information
- Full name: Robert MacDonald
- Born: 14 February 1870; Clunes, Victoria, Australia
- Died: 7 March 1946 (aged 76); Victoria, British Columbia, Canada
- Batting: Right-handed
- Bowling: Right-arm leg-spin

Domestic team information
- Years: Team
- 1893-94 to 1903-04: Queensland
- 1899 to 1902: Leicestershire

Career statistics
Competition	First-class
Matches	48
Runs scored	2069
Batting average	31.83
100s/50s	4/8
Top score	147 not out
Balls bowled	284
Wickets	3
Bowling average	60.33
5 wickets in innings	0
10 wickets in match	0
Best bowling	3/49
Catches/stumpings	34/0
- Source: Cricinfo, 27 July 2019

Robert MacDonald (14 February 1870 – 7 March 1946) was an Australian cricketer who played first-class cricket for Queensland and Leicestershire from 1894 to 1903. He was born in Clunes, Victoria, Australia, and died in Victoria, British Columbia. He was a dentist.

== Life and career ==
Born in the goldfields town of Clunes in Victoria, Robbie MacDonald moved to Brisbane in 1881 with his mother and his stepfather, Justice A. B. Noel. After attending Brisbane Boys Grammar School MacDonald studied dentistry at the University of Pennsylvania, where he excelled. He was the first Queenslander to graduate as a doctor of dental surgery with honours.

In cricket, MacDonald had a reputation as an imperturbable defensive batsman. The English player and writer C. B. Fry said of him in 1901: "he pays extreme attention to not getting out, and has no regard for the time it takes to make his runs. He is an excellent antidote to the modern tendency to try for high hitting. He never hits a ball, but just pushes and blocks, pushes and blocks. His skill, however, in defence is most remarkable: and I doubt whether there has ever been a more perfect player in his own particular line." In a match for Leicestershire against Sussex in 1902 he batted for three and three-quarter hours for 33, in what an English newspaper called "a wonderfully patient innings". In 1902-03 he batted 375 minutes in the match to make 51 and 61 not out when Queensland lost narrowly to New South Wales.

MacDonald's highest first-class score was 147 not out for Leicestershire against Derbyshire in 1901, when he added 142 for the fourth wicket with John King and then made an unbroken stand of 226 for the fifth wicket with Frederic Geeson. Leicestershire won by an innings. A week earlier he had made 127 against Sussex, batting for about six hours. His only first-class century for Queensland came on the state team's tour of New Zealand in 1896–97, when he made 114 against Hawke's Bay, adding 228 for the sixth wicket with Owen Cowley. Playing for Valley in the Brisbane senior competition in 1898–99, he made 812 runs in 13 innings, with an average of 203.00, as he was not out nine times.

MacDonald served as secretary of the Queensland Cricket Association in 1894–95, and secretary of Leicestershire from 1922 to 1930. He also represented Australia on the Imperial Cricket Conference between the wars. He was instrumental in the reconciliation of the Australian and English cricket authorities after the acrimonious Bodyline series between the two countries in 1932–33. Sensing that feeling in England in the 1933 season was turning against the bodyline tactics that had given England victory in the 1932–33 series, he advised the Australian board to maintain gentle but firm pressure on the English authorities to forswear such tactics during the forthcoming Australian tour of England in 1934.
