= McGlinchy =

McGlinchy is a surname. Notable people with the surname include:

- Kevin McGlinchy (born 1977), American baseball player
- Sean McGlinchy (born 1992), Northern Ireland boxer
- Tobias McGlinchy Hill (1915–1977), New Zealand sailor and trade unionist

== See also ==
- McGlinchey
