= James Searle (cricketer) =

Australian cricketer

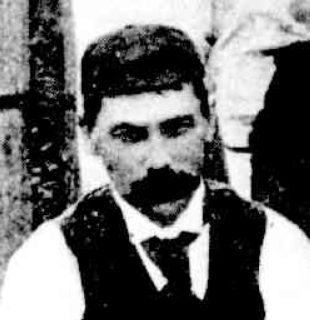

Personal information
- Born: 8 August 1861; Sydney, Australia
- Died: 28 December 1936 (aged 75); Sydney, Australia
- Batting: Right-handed
- Role: Wicket-keeper

Domestic team information
- Years: Team
- 1888-89 to 1893-94: New South Wales

Career statistics
Competition	First-class
Matches	9
Runs scored	222
Batting average	24.66
100s/50s	0/0
Top score	45*
Catches/stumpings	11/6
- Source: Cricinfo, 2 October 2021

James Searle (8 August 1861 – 28 December 1936) was an Australian cricketer. He played nine first-class matches for New South Wales between 1888/89 and 1893/94.

== Life and career ==
Searle was a wicket-keeper and useful batsman. He played two first-class matches for New South Wales in the 1888–89 season, and his other seven matches on New South Wales' tour of New Zealand in 1893-94. With 16 and 45 not out he was the highest scorer on either side in New South Wales' victory over New Zealand in Christchurch.

Searle's playing career was affected by an injury he suffered during a trial match for the Australian team when he collided with a fence while fielding and fractured his leg. At the time he ran a drapery in Sydney, but during his recuperation he turned it into a sporting goods shop, which he ran successfully for about 30 years. He coached cricket at a number of schools, and was the New South Wales Cricket Association's full-time professional coach in the late 1920s, including the 1926–27 season, when the young Don Bradman first played in Sydney cricket.

A catcher, Searle was one of the pioneers of baseball in New South Wales, leading the efforts to found the baseball association in Sydney. He also coached baseball in schools and umpired in important matches.

Searle died at Sydney's Prince Alfred Hospital in December 1936 after a short illness. He was survived by his wife and their two daughters and two sons.

== See also ==
- List of New South Wales representative cricketers
