= Rest of Australia cricket team =

Historical Australian cricket team

The Rest of Australia cricket team (The Rest) was a domestic first-class cricket team in Australia that played intermittently between 1872/73 and 1939/40.

== Background ==
The Rest most frequently played games against the Australian cricket team, but also played against domestic Australian state sides such as New South Wales and Victoria. The matches between The Rest and Australia were often used to help the national selectors choose teams for forthcoming tours or Test series as the players selected to play for The Rest were players not currently in the Australian XI but whose recent performances had them under consideration for selection.

== Matches ==
Season	Date	Opponent	Venue	Result	Notes
1872/73	26 - 28 Dec 1872	Victoria	Melbourne Cricket Ground	The Rest won by 3 wickets	Not considered a first-class match as The Rest used 13 players.
1888/89	1 - 5 Feb 1889	Australian XI	Sydney Cricket Ground	Australian XI won by 214 runs	
1895/96	6 - 10 Mar 1896	Australian XI	Sydney Cricket Ground	Australian XI won by 2 wickets	Match played as a selection trial for the 1896 Ashes tour.
1898/99	3 - 8 Mar 1899	Australian XI	Sydney Cricket Ground	Australian XI won by 7 wickets	Matches played as selection trials for the 1899 Ashes tour.
1898/99	10 - 13 Mar 1899	Australian XI	Melbourne Cricket Ground	Australian XI won by 9 wickets	Matches played as selection trials for the 1899 Ashes tour.
1898/99	17 - 22 Mar 1899	Australian XI	Adelaide Oval	Australian XI won by 4 wickets	Matches played as selection trials for the 1899 Ashes tour.
1899/1900	2 - 6 Feb 1900	Australian XI	Sydney Cricket Ground	Australian XI won by 151 runs	Played as a benefit match to raise funds for the New South Wales Imperial Bushmen and the New South Wales Patriotic Fund.
1906/07	15 - 19 Feb 1907	New South Wales	Sydney Cricket Ground	Rest of Australia won by 8 wickets	Match was played as a testimonial to Syd Gregory.
1907/08	20 - 24 Mar 1908	Australian XI	Sydney Cricket Ground	Australian XI won by an innings and 3 runs	Match was played as a testimonial for Monty Noble.
1908/09	5 - 9 Feb 1909	Australian XI	Sydney Cricket Ground	Australian XI won by 8 wickets	Matches played as selection trials for the 1909 Ashes tour.
1908/09	12 - 15 Feb 1909	Australian XI	Melbourne Cricket Ground	Australian XI won by an innings and 158 runs	Matches played as selection trials for the 1909 Ashes tour.
1909/10	21 - 25 Jan 1910	New South Wales	Sydney Cricket Ground	New South Wales won by 35 runs	Match was played as a testimonial for Charles Turner.
1910/11	17 - 20 Mar 1911	Australian XI	Melbourne Cricket Ground	Match drawn	Match was played as a testimonial for Tom Warne.
1912/13	7 - 12 Feb 1913	New South Wales	Sydney Cricket Ground	Match drawn	Match was played as a testimonial for Victor Trumper.
1921/22	3 - 7 Feb 1922	Australian XI	Sydney Cricket Ground	Match drawn	Match was played as a testimonial for Frank Iredale
1925/26	4 - 8 Dec 1925	Australian XI	Sydney Cricket Ground	Rest of Australia won by 156 runs	Match was played as a selection trial ahead of the 1926 Ashes tour.
1926/27	18 - 22 Feb 1927	Australian XI	Sydney Cricket Ground	Australian XI won by 7 wickets	Match was played as a testimonial for Charlie Macartney.
1928/29	19 - 22 Oct 1928	Australian XI	Melbourne Cricket Ground	Australian XI won by an innings and 43 runs	Match was played as a Test selection trial game ahead of the 1928/29 Ashes series.
1930/31	14 - 18 Nov 1930	Australian XI	Melbourne Cricket Ground	Match drawn	Match was played as testimonial to Jack Ryder.
1933/34	24 - 28 Nov 1933	Australian XI	Sydney Cricket Ground	The Rest won by 2 wickets	Match was played as a testimonial for former players Herbie Collins, Charlie Kelleway and Tommy Andrews as well as a selection trial for the 1934 Ashes tour.
1939/40	8 - 11 Mar 1940	New South Wales	Sydney Cricket Ground	New South Wales won by 2 wickets	Match was played as a fundraiser for patriotic funds in the states from which the players came, New South Wales, Queensland, Victoria and South Australia.

== See also ==
- The Rest (Bombay)
- Rest of England cricket teams aka The Rest (of England)
- Rest of India
- Rest of South Africa
