= New South Wales cricket team in New Zealand in 1889–90 =

New South Wales tour of New Zealand 1889–90
- Dates: January – March 1890
- Cricket format: First-class
- Matches: 5
- Most runs: Jonas Davis (270)
- Most wickets: Sydney Callaway (32)

The New South Wales cricket team toured New Zealand from January to March 1890 and played five first-class matches and two minor matches. New South Wales won four of the five first-class matches and drew the other and won both minor matches. This was the first tour of New Zealand by New South Wales.

== Team ==
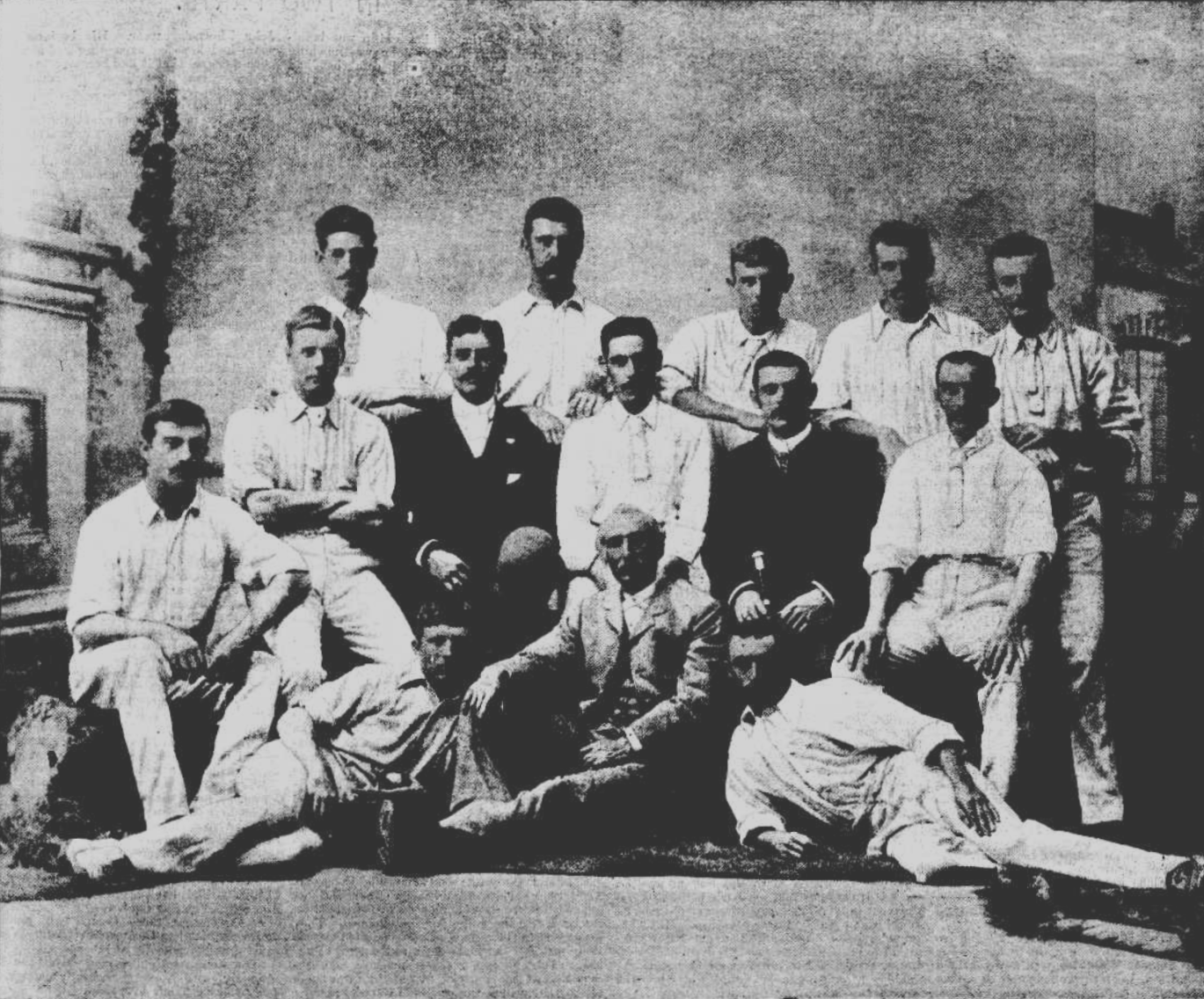
The touring party

The following players were selected for the tour:

- Sydney Callaway
- Alfred Clarke
- John Cottam
- George Cowper
- Jonas Davis (Captain)
- Joel Joseph
- Wally McGlinchey
- Andrew Newell
- Henry Robinson
- James Shepherd
- George Youill

== Matches ==
=== First-class matches ===
Date	Opponent	Venue	Result	Notes
30–31 January 1890	Auckland	Auckland Domain, Auckland	Match drawn	2 day match
7–10 February 1890	Canterbury	Lancaster Park, Christchurch	New South Wales won by 109 runs	3 day match
14–15 February 1890	Otago	Carisbrook, Dunedin	New South Wales won by an innings and 65 runs	3 day match
21–22 February 1890	Wellington	Basin Reserve, Wellington	New South Wales won by 8 wickets	2 day match
28 February – 3 March 1890	Auckland	Auckland Domain, Auckland	New South Wales won by 8 wickets	3 day match

=== Minor matches ===
Date	Opponent	Venue	Result	Notes
13 February 1890	Oamaru	North Road Ground, Oamaru	New South Wales won by an innings and 55 runs.	
18 February 1890	South Canterbury	South Canterbury Athletic Club Ground, Timaru	New South Wales won by 9 wickets	
