= Sydney Austin =

Australian cricketer (1866–1932)

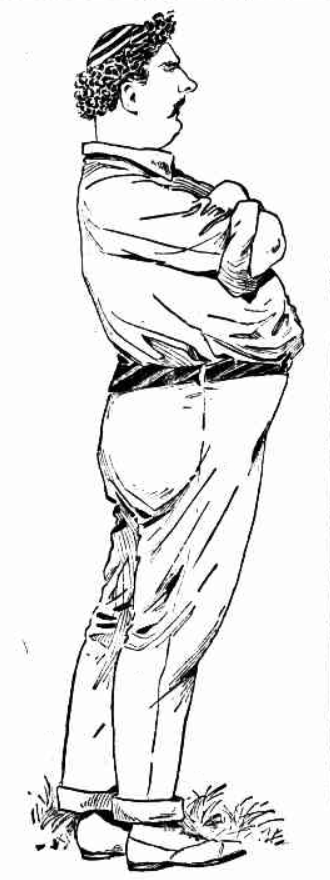

Personal information
- Full name: Sydney Walter Austin
- Born: 16 November 1866; Sydney, Australia
- Died: 9 September 1932 (aged 65); Randwick, Sydney, Australia
- Batting: Right-handed
- Bowling: Right-arm leg-spin

Domestic team information
- Years: Team
- 1892–1894: New South Wales

Career statistics
| Competition | First-class |
|---|---|
| Matches | 8 |
| Runs scored | 176 |
| Batting average | 14.66 |
| 100s/50s | 0/0 |
| Top score | 43 |
| Balls bowled | 1797 |
| Wickets | 53 |
| Bowling average | 11.69 |
| 5 wickets in innings | 6 |
| 10 wickets in match | 1 |
| Best bowling | 8/14 |
| Catches/stumpings | 2/0 |
- Source: Cricinfo, 24 March 2018

Sydney Walter Austin (16 November 1866 – 9 September 1932) was an Australian cricketer. He played eight first-class matches for New South Wales between April 1893 and February 1894.

== Biography ==
Austin was described as a "veritable W.G." in junior cricket due to his physique and performances. However, he played for the minor club Clyde in Moore Park cricket, and while he was often offered a place by clubs in higher standard competitions he remained loyal to his club. It was suggested this prevented him from potentially representing Australia. He was a slow bowler who generally bowled breaks from the leg on a good length; he also performed well with the bat at times.

In 1891 Austin was selected for a New South Wales junior side which played Victoria and he scored so well that it caused confusion as to why he was not already playing senior cricket. He finally joined a senior cricket team in 1894 when he joined Waverley and he took the most first grade wickets in the 1895–96 and 1897–98 seasons.

All but one match of Austin's first-class career came on New South Wales's tour of New Zealand in 1893–94, when he took 52 wickets in seven matches with his leg-spin, including 8 for 14 against Hawke's Bay. In the 160-run victory over New Zealand he opened the bowling and bowled unchanged throughout both innings, taking 7 for 63 and 6 for 35, as well as top-scoring in New South Wales's first innings with 43.

In 1896, Austin was selected in the New South Wales side to play in Sheffield Shield interstate games; however, he withdrew due to a family bereavement. By 1899, he was no longer an active cricketer.

Austin worked in the New South Wales Auditor-General's Department for 43 years. He died at his home in Randwick in 1932, aged 66, survived by his wife and a son.
