= Owen Cowley =

Australian cricketer

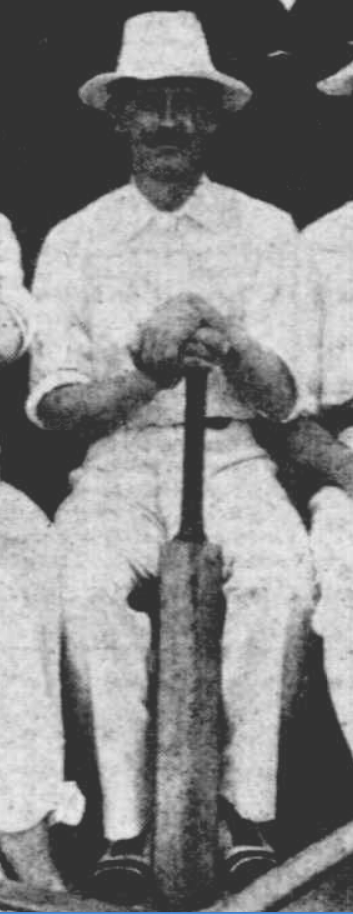

Personal information
- Full name: Owen William Joseph Cowley
- Born: 14 December 1868; Port Louis, Mauritius
- Died: 27 February 1922 (aged 53); Brisbane, Queensland, Australia
- Batting: Right-handed
- Bowling: Right-arm

Career statistics
Competition	First-class
Matches	11
Runs scored	432
Batting average	27.00
100s/50s	1/1
Top score	135
Balls bowled	313
Wickets	6
Bowling average	17.16
5 wickets in innings	0
10 wickets in match	0
Best bowling	3/14
Catches/stumpings	7/–
- Source: ESPNcricinfo, 25 January 2025

Owen William Joseph Cowley (14 December 1868 – 27 February 1922) was an Australian cricketer. He played eleven first-class matches for New South Wales and Queensland between 1893–94 and 1896–97.

Cowley was born in Mauritius and moved to Australia with his family in 1881.

All of Cowley's first-class cricket was played in New Zealand: seven matches on New South Wales' tour of 1893–94, and four on Queensland's tour of 1896–97. He made his only first-class century for Queensland against Hawke's Bay, when he went to the wicket at 214 for 5 and scored 135, adding 238 for the sixth wicket with Robbie MacDonald, who scored 114.

Cowley married Delia Kearney in Nambour in December 1905. He was the licensee of a hotel in Nambour before taking up the licence of a hotel in Yandina in 1908.
