= Ted Noble =

Australian cricketer

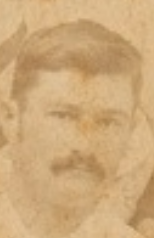

Personal information
- Full name: Edward George Noble
- Born: 16 January 1865; Brickfield Hill, New South Wales, Australia
- Died: 4 May 1941 (aged 76); Sydney, Australia
- Source: Cricinfo, 11 January 2017

Ted Noble (16 January 1865 – 4 May 1941) was an Australian cricketer. He played seven first-class matches for New South Wales in 1893/94 on a tour of New Zealand.

== See also ==
- List of New South Wales representative cricketers
