= McGlinchey Stafford =

American law firm

- Headquarters: Pan American Life Center New Orleans, LA
- No. of offices: 18
- No. of attorneys: 170 (2018)
- Major practice areas: Business, Banking and Corporate, Consumer Finance, Government, Healthcare, Labor and Employment, Litigation including Products Liability and Class Action Defense, Public Finance and Real Estate
- Key people: Michael Ferachi (Firm Managing Member)
- Date founded: 1974
- Website: www.mcglinchey.com

McGlinchey Stafford was an American law firm focusing on corporate defense litigation. Headquartered in New Orleans, the firm employed more than 170 lawyers and had offices in 18 cities in 12 states plus the District of Columbia.

== History ==
The firm was founded in New Orleans in 1974 by Dermot S. McGlinchey and Graham Stafford. It began as a small group in a single downtown New Orleans office. The firm is ranked on The National Law Journal's list of the 350 largest law firms in the United States. The firm serves a variety of clients, from Fortune 500 companies to entrepreneurs and government entities.

In 2005, the firm launched the CAFA Law Blog, the first blog to focus exclusively on the Class Action Fairness Act of 2005.

During Hurricane Katrina, the firm implemented an emergency plan it had drafted after the September 11 attacks and secured additional office space and 41 apartments in Baton Rouge for displaced attorneys and staff.

The firm ceased operations in January 2026. The firm filed for Chapter 7 bankruptcy liquidation on February 21, 2026, listing over $10 million in liabilities.
