= Wally McGlinchey =

Australian cricketer (1864–1946)

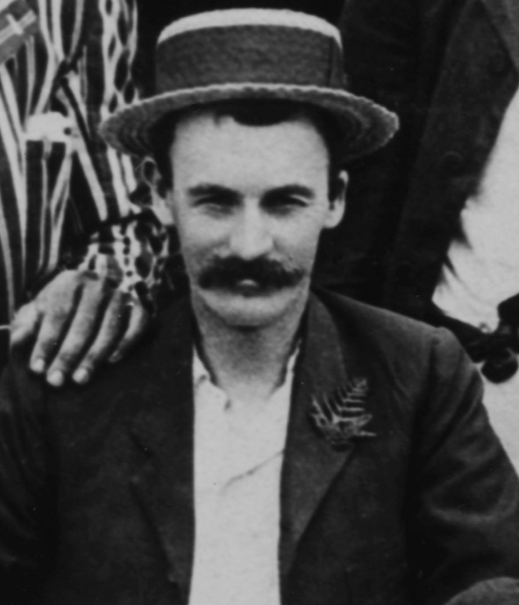

Personal information
- Full name: William Walter McGlinchey
- Born: 31 January 1864; Newcastle, New South Wales, Australia
- Died: 1 July 1946 (aged 82); Sydney, Australia
- Batting: Right-handed
- Bowling: Right-arm off-break

Domestic team information
- Years: Team
- 1885-86 to 1892-93: New South Wales
- 1893-94 to 1899-1900: Queensland

Career statistics
Competition	First-class
Matches	20
Runs scored	476
Batting average	14.00
100s/50s	0/0
Top score	45
Balls bowled	2960
Wickets	71
Bowling average	18.94
5 wickets in innings	4
10 wickets in match	2
Best bowling	6/62
Catches/stumpings	6/–
- Source: ESPNcricinfo, 29 December 2019

William Walter McGlinchey (31 January 1864 – 1 July 1946) was an Australian cricketer. He played twenty first-class matches for New South Wales and Queensland between 1885/86 and 1899/1900.

== Life and career ==
Wally McGlinchey (often spelled McGlinchy) was an off-spin bowler from Newcastle, New South Wales. A tall, well-built man, he bowled off-spin at medium-pace and was a useful batsman.

He represented Newcastle against the English team in 1882-83, and played a few matches for New South Wales. He toured New Zealand with New South Wales in 1890, playing all five first-class matches and taking 30 wickets at an average of 8.96, including 4 for 27 and 6 for 62 in the victory over Canterbury. He moved to Queensland in 1893 and played several matches for the state team in the era before they joined the Sheffield Shield competition. He toured New Zealand with Queensland in 1896-97, once again playing all five first-class matches, taking 22 wickets at an average of 17.04, including 5 for 63 and 5 for 73 in the match against New Zealand.

McGlinchey later served as door-keeper to the New South Wales dressing room at the Sydney Cricket Ground for 22 years. He also assisted there with coaching.
