= David Miller (Australian cricketer) =

Australian cricketer

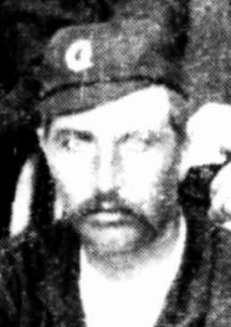

Personal information
- Full name: David Lawson Miller
- Born: 30 January 1870; Holytown, Scotland
- Died: 12 April 1943 (aged 73); Clayfield, Queensland, Australia
- Batting: Left-handed
- Bowling: Left-arm fast
- Role: Bowler

Umpiring information
- FC umpired: 2 (1896–1898)

Career statistics
Competition	First-class
Matches	15
Runs scored	162
Batting average	8.10
100s/50s	0/0
Top score	21
Balls bowled	2561
Wickets	55
Bowling average	19.00
5 wickets in innings	2
10 wickets in match	0
Best bowling	5/38
Catches/stumpings	11/0
- Source: ESPNcricinfo, 19 June 2016

David Lawson Miller (30 January 1870 – 12 April 1943) was an Australian cricketer. He played first-class cricket for Auckland, New South Wales and Queensland between 1892 and 1906. He also was an umpire in two first-class matches.

Miller was a left-arm fast bowler. His best first-class figures were 4 for 39 and 5 for 38 for the touring Queensland team against Canterbury in January 1897.

Miller married Amy Morgan in Lithgow, New South Wales, in May 1901. They lived in Brisbane, where he was a garage proprietor. He died in April 1943, aged 73.
