= John Gould (cricketer) =

Australian cricketer

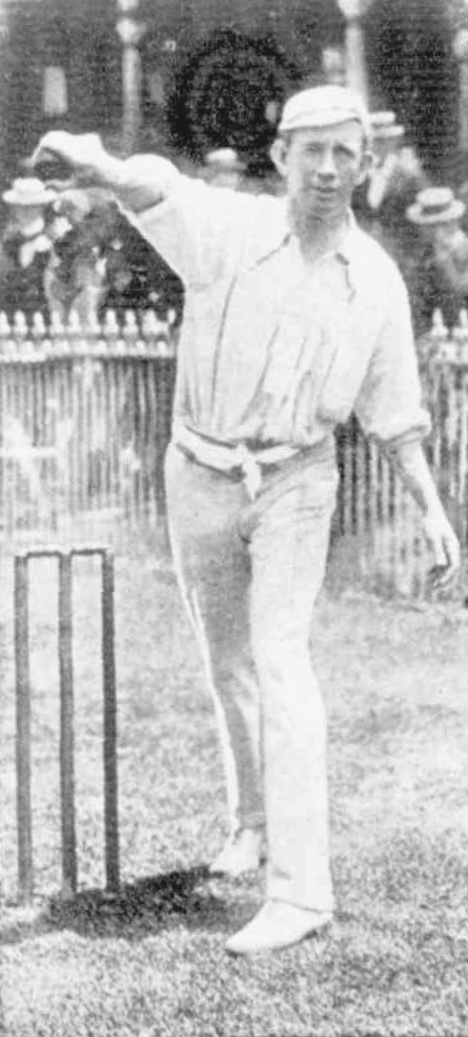

Personal information
- Born: 1 October 1872; Sydney, Australia
- Died: 4 December 1908 (aged 36); Sydney, Australia
- Source: ESPNcricinfo, 30 December 2016

John Gould (1 October 1872 – 4 December 1908) was an Australian cricketer. He played eleven first-class matches for New South Wales between 1891/92 and 1895/96.

== See also ==
- List of New South Wales representative cricketers
