= George Cowper (cricketer) =

Australian cricketer

Personal information
- Born: 1869; Bendigo, Victoria, Australia
- Died: 16 April 1932 (aged 62–63); Sydney, Australia
- Source: ESPNcricinfo, 25 December 2016

George Cowper (1869 – 16 April 1932) was an Australian cricketer. He played six first-class matches for New South Wales between 1888/89 and 1889/90.

== See also ==
- List of New South Wales representative cricketers
