= Monty Noble =

Australian cricketer

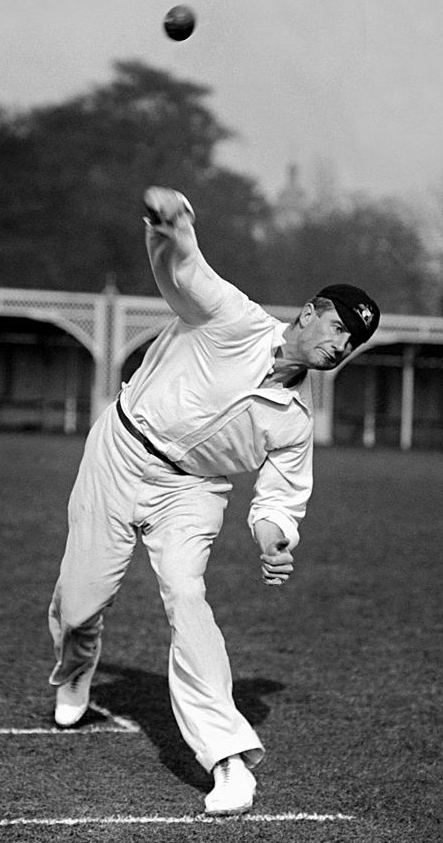
- Noble in about 1905

Personal information
- Full name: Montague Alfred Noble
- Born: 28 January 1873; Chinatown, Sydney, Australia
- Died: 22 June 1940 (aged 67); Randwick, New South Wales, Australia
- Nickname: MA, Alf, Mary Ann
- Height: 1.85 m (6 ft 1 in)
- Batting: Right-handed
- Bowling: Right-arm medium pace
- Role: All-rounder

International information
- National side: Australia (1898–1909)
- Test debut (cap 76): 1 January 1898 v England
- Last Test: 9 August 1909 v England

Domestic team information
- Years: Team
- 1893–1919: New South Wales

Career statistics
Competition	Tests	First-class
Matches	42	248
Runs scored	1,997	13,975
Batting average	30.25	40.74
100s/50s	1/16	37/66
Top score	133	284
Balls bowled	7,159	33,112
Wickets	121	625
Bowling average	25.00	23.11
5 wickets in innings	9	33
10 wickets in match	2	7
Best bowling	7/17	8/48
Catches/stumpings	26/0	191
- Source: CricInfo, 9 February 2008

Montague Alfred Noble (28 January 1873 – 22 June 1940) was an Australian cricketer who played for New South Wales and Australia. A right-hand batsman, right-handed bowler who could deliver both medium pace and off-break bowling, capable fieldsman and tactically sound captain, Noble is considered one of the great Australian all-rounders. He scored 13,975 first class runs between 1893 and 1920 and took 624 wickets. He made 37 centuries – including a best of 284 in 1902 – and set several partnership and individual high-score records for his State team.

He played 42 Tests for his country, and captained the team for 15 of these between 1903 and 1909. Only the 12th captain of his country, he won eight of these games, lost five and drew two. Between his first Test in January 1898 and his last in August 1909, he scored 1,997 runs at 30.25 and took 121 wickets at 25.00. He complemented his only century, 133 in 1903, by scoring 16 half-centuries. Noble played 39 of his 42 Tests against England, and the other three against South Africa.

In later life, he coached and played for club level teams, including Paddington Cricket Club with which he had a long-standing connection throughout his career. He moved from banking to dentistry, and published his exegesis on cricket, Gilligan's Men. His elder brother, Ted Noble, also played briefly for New South Wales.

In 2006, he was inducted into the Cricket Hall of Fame by the CA. In June 2021, he was inducted into the ICC Cricket Hall of Fame as one of the special inductees to mark the inaugural edition of the ICC World Test Championship final.

== Career ==
Noble was born in Sydney on 28 January 1873. He was the youngest of eight sons of Joseph and Maria Noble, who emigrated from Egham, Surrey, England. He "made a name" for himself in grade cricket with the Paddington club and first played for New South Wales (NSW) as a teenager. He toured New Zealand with NSW in 1893/94, and in 1894/95 scored a 152* against an England touring team under Andrew Stoddart which drew English attention to his batting. This cemented his place in the state side, and he was a significant contributor to NSW's consecutive Sheffield Shield victories in 1895–96 and 1896–97.

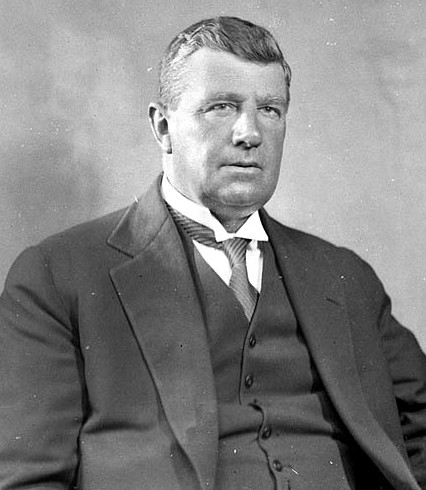
Noble in 1932.

Over the summer of 1897/98, Stoddart returned with another England team and were defeated in four of the five Ashes Test matches. Noble, whose first-class form had earned him selection, scored 17 in Australia's only innings of 520, then took one wicket as England stumbled to 315 all out. With the Australians enforcing the follow on, Noble routed the tourists with 6/49. He ended the series with the best bowling averages for both teams. Australia returned to England in 1899, and Noble experienced his first overseas tour. He scored 116 in a warm-up match and "impressed English critics chiefly by his patience and defence." He played in all five Tests, scoring 367 runs at 52.42, with four half centuries, and took 13 wickets at 31.23. At Manchester he scored 60 and 89, withstanding English bowling for eight and a half hours. Wisden would later record on his death that "his patience equalled his skill in defence, while at times he used his height and reach with full effect in driving, pulling, forcing the ball off his legs, and cutting either square or late – a batsman of rare style and execution without any sign of weakness." He was in particular noted for his ability to cater his technique to English conditions. He was named Wisden Cricketer of the Year for 1900.

Noble faced England in Australia over the winter of 1901/02, scoring 138 runs at 15.33, and taking 32 wickets at 19.00. He then returned to England in 1902 as "the best all-rounder" under Joe Darling. In a warm-up match at Hove against Sussex, he scored his career-best 284 in a then world-record partnership of 428 with Warwick Armstrong. He scored 1,416 runs across the tour, at 32.93, and took 98 wickets, though in the Test series he scored only 129 of these runs at 18.42. 1902/03 saw Noble score a further 92 runs at 23.00, including another half-century, and take six wickets.

Noble was elected to the Australian captaincy for the 1903/04 Ashes series, however England were victorious. In 1905 the leadership reverted to Joe Darling for the tour of England, but Australian again lost the rubber. Noble nevertheless scored 2,084 runs at 44.34 across the entire tour. His bowling was viewed as weaker than normal, however Wisden credited his innovative captaincy and field settings. He led his team to England once more in 1909, and reversed a hitherto unsuccessful tour for Australia with innovative captaincy and bowling. In his final Test at The Oval on 9 August 1909, he scored two and 55, though he went wicketless.

Noble returned to State cricket, where in 1908 a testimonial match at the Sydney Cricket Ground had earned him £2,000. He continued at New South Wales until 1920, however with seasonal returns of 23, 54, 201, 80 and 13 runs and wicket totals that surpassed two per season only twice in the years either side of World War I, Noble was past his prime. He retired in 1920 and moved into banking, and then dentistry. He wrote and published several works on cricket: Gilligan's Men (1925), The Game's the Thing (1926), Those Ashes (1927), and The Fight for the Ashes (1929) and also became a noted commentator and broadcaster. He continued his association with Paddington Cricket Club, and worked for a time coaching junior cricket teams. Noble unsuccessfully stood for preselection as the Nationalist Party candidate at the 1931 East Sydney by-election. He died in Sydney on 22 June 1940, survived by his brother who died a year later. He was also a church bell ringer, and reportedly visited many towers in England while on cricket tours.

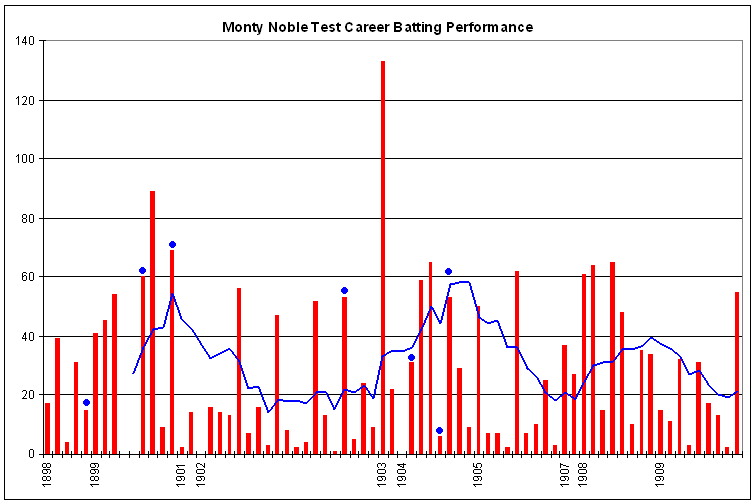
Graph of Noble's Test batting performance.
