= List of South Australian representative cricketers =

This is a list of cricketers who have represented South Australia in either a first-class, List A or Twenty20 match.

South Australia's inaugural first-class match commenced on 10 November 1877, against Tasmania at the Adelaide Oval, its first limited overs match on 30 November 1969, against Western Australia at the WACA Ground and its first Twenty20 match on 8 January 2006, against Victoria at the St Kilda Cricket Ground.

While some of the cricketers mentioned represented other teams the information included is for their career with South Australia.

== Key ==
- First – Year of debut
- Last – Year of latest game
- Apps – Number of matches played
- – Player has represented Australia in a Test match, Limited Overs International or Twenty20 International match.
- – Player has represented a nation other than Australia in a Test match, Limited Overs International or Twenty20 International.

== Cricketers ==
| Name | First | Last | Apps | First | Last | Apps | First | Last | Apps | Notes |
| Name | First-class | | | List A | | | Twenty20 | | | Notes |
|---|---|---|---|---|---|---|---|---|---|---|
| Nathan Adcock | 1997/98 | 2007/08 | 28 | 1997/98 | 2007/08 | 40 | 2006/07 | 2007/08 | 8 | |
| Colin Alexander | 1925/26 | 1928/29 | 21 | – | – | – | – | – | – | |
| Phil Alley | 1989/90 | 1989/90 | 4 | 1989/90 | 1989/90 | 2 | – | – | – | |
| Albert Ambler | 1920/21 | 1925/26 | 22 | – | – | - | – | – | – | |
| William Amos | 1890/91 | 1892/93 | 2 | – | – | - | – | – | – | |
| Peter Anderson | 1988/89 | 1988/89 | 12 | 1988/89 | 1988/89 | 1 | – | – | – | |
| Huntley Armstrong | 1990/91 | 1991/92 | 3 | 1992/93 | 1992/93 | 2 | – | – | – | |
| Evan Arnold | 1998/99 | 1998/99 | 2 | – | – | – | – | – | – | |
| Geoffrey Attenborough | 1972/73 | 1980/81 | 57 | 1975/76 | 1980/81 | 9 | – | – | – | |
| Cecil Austen | 1945/46 | 1945/46 | 1 | – | – | – | – | – | – | Also played Australian rules football for Hawthorn Football Club. |
| Charles Backman | 1911/12 | 1911/12 | 1 | – | – | – | – | – | – | |
| Jack Badcock | 1934/35 | 1940/41 | 40 | – | – | – | – | – | – | |
| Kenneth Bagshaw | 1946/47 | 1947/48 | 4 | – | – | - | – | – | – | |
| Alfred Bailey | 1953/54 | 1955/56 | 3 | – | – | - | – | – | – | |
| Bertram Bailey | 1896/97 | 1901/02 | 8 | – | – | - | – | – | – | Brother of Ernest Bailey. |
| Cullen Bailey | 2004/05 | 2011/12 | 31 | 2005/06 | 2012/13 | 11 | 2010/11 | 2010/11 | 5 | |
| Ernest Bailey | 1906/07 | 1906/07 | 1 | – | – | - | – | – | – | Brother of Bertram Bailey. |
| David Ballans | 1889/90 | 1892/93 | 2 | – | – | - | – | – | – | |
| Jeffrey Barnes | 1972/73 | 1974/75 | 11 | 1973/74 | 1974/75 | 3 | – | – | – | |
| Albert Bartlett | 1925/26 | 1925/26 | 1 | – | – | - | – | – | – | |
| John Beagley | 1956/57 | 1959/60 | 18 | – | – | - | – | – | – | |
| Albert Bedford | 1956/57 | 1958/59 | 15 | – | – | - | - | – | – | |
| Philip Bednall | 1948/49 | 1948/49 | 2 | – | – | - | – | – | – | |
| Chester Bennett | 1945/46 | 1945/46 | 6 | – | – | - | – | – | – | |
| Rex Bennett | 1922/23 | 1922/23 | 5 | – | – | - | – | – | – | |
| Thomas Bennett | 1894/95 | 1894/95 | 1 | – | – | - | – | – | – | |
| Jeffrey Benton | 1977/78 | 1984/85 | 4 | 1977/78 | 1984/85 | 4 | – | – | – | Father of Nick Benton. |
| Nick Benton | 2014/15 | 2016/17 | 5 | 2015/16 | 2016/17 | 3 | – | – | – | Son of Jeff Benton. |
| Darren Berry | 1989/90 | 1989/90 | 12 | 1989/90 | 1989/90 | 4 | – | – | – | |
| John Bevan | 1877/78 | 1877/78 | 1 | – | – | - | – | - | – | |
| Michael Bevan | 1989/90 | 1989/90 | 6 | 1989/90 | 1989/90 | 2 | – | – | – | |
| Tom Birchall | 1986/87 | 1986/87 | 3 | 1986/87 | 1986/87 | 2 | – | – | – | |
| Glenn Bishop | 1982/83 | 1992/93 | 94 | 1982/83 | 1992/3 | 31 | – | – | – | |
| Graham Black | 1949/50 | 1950/51 | 6 | – | – | - | – | – | – | |
| Bob Blewett | 1975/76 | 1978/79 | 25 | 1976/77 | 1978/79 | 3 | – | – | – | Father of Greg Blewett. |
| Greg Blewett | 1991/92 | 2005/06 | 124 | 1992/93 | 2006/07 | 102 | – | – | – | Son of Bob Blewett. |
| Harry Blinman | 1880/81 | 1895/96 | 23 | – | – | - | – | – | – | Also played Australian rules football for Norwood Football Club. |
| Aiden Blizzard | 2010/11 | 2011/12 | 14 | 2010/11 | 2010/11 | 10 | 2010/11 | 2010/11 | 4 | |
| George Bloomfield | 1908/09 | 1908/09 | 3 | – | – | - | – | – | – | |
| Rex Blundell | 1964/65 | 1970/71 | 24 | 1969/70 | 1970/71 | 3 | - | - | – | |
| Cameron Borgas | 2000/01 | 2010/11 | 37 | 2005/06 | 2011/12 | 51 | 2005/06 | 2011/12 | 23 | Brother of Jason Borgas. |
| Jason Borgas | 2006/07 | 2007/08 | 6 | - | – | - | – | – | – | Brother of Cameron Borgas. |
| Johan Botha | 2012/13 | 2014/15 | 23 | 2012/13 | 2012/13 | 17 | – | – | – | |
| Robert Botten | 1877/78 | 1877/78 | 1 | – | – | - | – | - | - | |
| Bruce Bowley | 1947/48 | 1951/52 | 30 | – | – | - | - | - | - | Son of Leonard Bowley. |
| Leonard Bowley | 1922/23 | 1924/25 | 7 | – | – | - | - | - | - | Father of Bruce Bowley and brother-in-law of Arthur Richardson. |
| Craig Bradley | 1983/84 | 1983/84 | 2 | – | – | - | – | – | – | Also played Australian rules football for Carlton and Port Adelaide football clubs. |
| Donald Bradman | 1935/36 | 1948/49 | 44 | – | – | - | – | – | – | |
| Mark Bradshaw | – | – | – | 1998/99 | 1998/99 | 1 | – | – | – | |
| Clive Braybrook | 1921/22 | 1921/22 | 1 | – | – | - | – | – | – | |
| Jamie Brayshaw | 1991/92 | 1996/97 | 57 | 1992/93 | 1996/97 | 26 | – | – | – | Son of Ian Brayshaw and brother of Mark Brayshaw. |
| Hugh Bridgman | 1912/13 | 1922/23 | 10 | – | – | - | – | – | – | |
| John Bridson | 1883/84 | 1883/84 | 1 | – | – | - | – | – | – | |
| Peter Brinsley | - | – | – | 1983/84 | 1984/85 | 5 | – | – | – | |
| Gordon Brooks | 1961/62 | 1963/64 | 26 | – | – | - | – | – | – | |
| Jake Brown | 2007/08 | 2012/13 | 5 | 2008/09 | 2008/09 | 1 | 2008/09 | 2008/09 | 1 | |
| Walter Bullough | 1880/81 | 1880/81 | 2 | – | – | - | – | – | – | |
| Garth Burton | 1939/40 | 1939/40 | 3 | – | – | - | – | – | – | |
| Jack Burton | 1951/52 | 1951/52 | 1 | – | – | - | – | – | – | |
| Ben Cameron | 2003/04 | 2006/06 | 10 | 2003/04 | 2006/07 | 9 | – | – | – | |
| Robert Cameron | 1957/58 | 1958/59 | 4 | – | – | – | – | – | – | |
| Gordon Campbell | 1909/10 | 1914/15 | 23 | – | – | – | – | – | – | |
| Paul Carew | 1988/89 | 1988/89 | 1 | – | – | – | – | – | – | |
| Alex Carey | 2012/13 | 2012/13 | 1 | 2012/13 | 2012/13 | 1 | – | – | – | |
| Tom Carlton | 1928/29 | 1931/32 | 27 | – | – | - | – | – | – | |
| Ian Carmichael | 1983/84 | 1987/88 | 26 | 1983/84 | 1985/86 | 9 | – | – | – | |
| Arthur Carracher | 1896/97 | 1896/97 | 2 | – | – | - | - | - | – | |
| Edward Carragher | 1922/23 | 1922/23 | 2 | – | – | - | – | – | – | |
| Rob Cassell | 2010/11 | 2010/11 | 7 | – | – | - | – | - | – | |
| Wally Catchlove | 1931/32 | 1933/34 | 9 | – | – | - | – | – | – | |
| Ainslie Caterer | 1884/85 | 1884/85 | 1 | – | – | - | – | – | – | |
| Barry Causby | 1973/74 | 1980/81 | 32 | 1973/74 | 1978/79 | 5 | | | | Cousin of John Causby. |
| John Causby | 1960/61 | 1973/74 | 63 | 1969/70 | 1972/73 | 7 | - | – | – | Cousin of Barry Causby. |
| Cornelius Chamberlain | 1905/06 | 1910/11 | 3 | – | – | - | – | – | – | Brother of Leonard and Jack Chamberlain. Also played Australian rules football for Norwood Football Club. |
| Leonard Chamberlain | 1907/08 | 1913/14 | 19 | – | – | - | - | – | – | Brother of Cornelius and Jack Chamberlain. Also played Australian rules football for Norwood. |
| Greg Chappell | 1966/67 | 1972/73 | 57 | 1969/70 | 1972/73 | 7 | – | – | – | Grandson of Vic Richardson. Brother of Ian and Trevor Chappell. |
| Ian Chappell | 1961/62 | 1979/80 | 109 | 1970/71 | 1979/80 | 13 | – | – | – | |
| Trevor Chappell | 1972/73 | 1975/76 | 17 | 1972/73 | 1972/73 | 1 | – | – | – | |
| Garry Chillingworth | 1998/99 | 1998/99 | 3 | – | – | – | – | – | – | |
| Hubert Chinner | 1898/99 | 1899/1900 | 3 | – | – | – | – | – | – | |
| Henry Chittleborough | 1883/84 | 1884/85 | 2 | – | – | – | – | – | – | |
| Robert Christensen | 1982/83 | 1983/84 | 4 | 1982/83 | 1982/83 | 2 | – | – | – | |
| Daniel Christian | 2007/08 | 2012/13 | 36 | 2007/08 | 2012/13 | 46 | 2007/08 | 2010/11 | 28 | Second Australian Aboriginal to play for Australia. |
| Darren Chyer | 1988/89 | 1988/89 | 1 | 1987/88 | 1987/88 | 1 | – | - | – | |
| David Clarke | 1988/89 | 1989/90 | 2 | 1990/91 | 1992/93 | 4 | – | – | – | Son of Graham Clarke. |
| Graham Clarke | 1965/66 | 1970/71 | 6 | – | – | - | - | – | – | Father of David Clarke. |
| Norman Claxton | 1898/99 | 1909/10 | 39 | – | – | - | – | – | – | After whom baseball's Claxton Shield is named. Half-brother of William Claxton. Also played Australian rules football for North Adelaide Football Club. |
| William Claxton | 1883/84 | 1895/96 | 2 | – | – | - | – | – | – | Half-brother of Norman Claxton. |
| Mark Cleary | 2002/03 | 2009/10 | 37 | 2002/03 | 2008/09 | 49 | 2005/06 | 2009/10 | 15 | |
| Peter Clements | 1972/73 | 1974/75 | 5 | – | – | - | – | – | – | |
| Mick Clingly | 1957/58 | 1959/60 | 5 | – | – | - | – | – | – | Also played Australian rules football for West Torrens Football Club. |
| Stanley Clutterbuck | 1913/14 | 1913/14 | 1 | – | – | - | – | – | – | |
| Timothy Colley | 1955/56 | 1955/56 | 3 | – | – | - | – | - | – | |
| Frank Collins | 1933/34 | 1935/36 | 15 | – | – | - | – | – | – | |
| Ephraim Coombe | 1887/88 | 1887/88 | 1 | – | – | - | – | – | – | Member of the South Australian House of Assembly from 1901 to 1912 and 1915–17. |
| Percy Coombe | 1903/04 | 1914/15 | 8 | – | – | - | – | – | – | |
| Tom Cooper | 2008/09 | 2014/15 | 42 | 2008/09 | 2014/15 | 51 | 2008/09 | 2010/11 | 21 | |
| William Cooper | 1914/15 | 1914/15 | 1 | – | – | - | – | – | – | |
| Mark Cosgrove | 2002/03 | 2014/15 | 62 | 2002/03 | 2014/15 | 64 | 2005/06 | 2009/10 | 17 | |
| Gary Cosier | 1974/75 | 1976/77 | 24 | 1974/75 | 1976/77 | 4 | – | – | – | |
| Harold Cotton | 1935/36 | 1940/41 | 25 | – | – | – | – | – | – | |
| Robert Cowan | 1904/05 | 1905/06 | 4 | – | – | – | – | – | – | |
| Reginald Craig | 1945/46 | 1950/51 | 31 | – | – | – | – | – | – | Brother of Hartley Craig. |
| John Craigie | 1887/88 | 1887/88 | 2 | – | – | - | – | - | - | |
| Michael Cranmer | – | – | - | 2009/10 | 2009/10 | 2 | – | – | – | |
| Jack Crawford | 1909/10 | 1909/10 | 2 | – | – | - | – | – | – | |
| Andrew Crook | 1998/99 | 1998/99 | 1 | – | – | – | – | – | – | |
| Adam Crosthwaite | 2011/12 | 2011/12 | 5 | 2011/12 | 2011/12 | 7 | – | – | – | |
| Jeff Crowe | 1977/78 | 1981/82 | 34 | 1979/80 | 1981/82 | 8 | – | – | – | Son of Dave Crowe and brother of Martin Crowe. |
| Daniel Cullen | 2004/05 | 2008/09 | 36 | 2004/05 | 2009/10 | 39 | 2005/06 | 2008/09 | 16 | |
| Ken Cunningham | 1960/61 | 1973/74 | 89 | 1969/70 | 1974/75 | 8 | – | – | – | |
| Barry Curtin | 1972/73 | 1977/78 | 20 | 1973/74 | 1975/76 | 3 | - | - | - | Brother of Paul and Peter Curtin. |
| Paul Curtin | 1974/75 | 1974/75 | 1 | – | – | - | - | – | – | Brother of Barry and Peter Curtin |
| Peter Curtin | 1971/72 | 1971/72 | 1 | – | – | - | - | – | – | Brother of Barry and Paul Curtin. |
| Lou Curtis | 1951/52 | 1951/52 | 1 | – | – | - | - | – | - | |
| Neil Dansie | 1949/50 | 1966/67 | 124 | – | – | - | – | – | – | Also played Australian rules football for Norwood. |
| Joe Darling | 1893/94 | 1907/08 | 42 | – | – | - | – | – | – | |
| Rick Darling | 1975/76 | 1985/86 | 74 | 1976/77 | 1985/86 | 13 | – | – | – | |
| John Davey | 1933/34 | 1934/35 | 5 | – | – | – | – | – | – | |
| John Richard Davey | 1981/82 | 1981/82 | 1 | 1975/76 | 1975/76 | 1 | – | – | – | Father of Tim Davey. |
| Tim Davey | 2011/12 | 2011/12 | 2 | 2014/15 | 2014/15 | 5 | – | – | – | Son of John Richard Davey. |
| Chris Davies | 1997/98 | 2003/04 | 25 | 1997/98 | 2002/03 | 38 | – | – | – | |
| John Davison | 2002/03 | 2003/04 | 15 | 2002/03 | 2004/05 | 14 | – | – | – | |
| Herbert Day | 1898/99 | 1898/99 | 1 | – | – | – | – | – | – | |
| Shane Deitz | 1998/99 | 2007/08 | 66 | 1999/2000 | 2007/08 | 18 | 2005/06 | 2005/06 | 2 | |
| William Delaney | 1888/89 | 1892/93 | 6 | – | – | - | – | – | – | |
| Andy Delmont | 2007/08 | 2007/08 | 6 | 2007/08 | 2007/08 | 3 | – | – | – | |
| Darren Dempsey | 2001/02 | 2001/02 | 3 | – | – | - | – | – | – | |
| Pitre Desmazeures | 1909/10 | 1909/10 | 1 | – | – | - | – | – | – | |
| Charles Deverson | 1930/31 | 1930/31 | 3 | – | – | - | – | – | – | |
| Charles Dolling | 1905/06 | 1922/23 | 29 | – | – | - | – | – | – | Test selector from 1928 to 1936. |
| Malcolm Dolman | 1981/82 | 1982/83 | 6 | – | – | – | – | – | – | |
| John Donaldson | 1972/73 | 1973/74 | 7 | 1973/74 | 1973/74 | 1 | – | – | – | |
| Bruce Dooland | 1945/46 | 1957/58 | 29 | – | – | - | – | – | – | |
| Theo Doropoulos | 2011/12 | 2011/12 | 2 | 2011/12 | 2011/12 | 3 | – | – | – | |
| Ben Dougall | 2011/12 | 2011/12 | 2 | 2010/11 | 2010/11 | 3 | – | – | – | |
| Jesse Hall | 2013/14 | 2014/15 | 18 | – | – | - | 2013/14 | – | 5 | Cousin of Shaun Tate |
| Granville Down | 1911/12 | 1911/12 | 7 | – | – | - | – | – | – | |
| Donnell Downey | 1925/26 | 1925/26 | 1 | – | – | - | – | – | – | |
| John Drennan | 1953/54 | 1958/59 | 46 | – | – | - | – | – | – | |
| Charles Drew | 1911/12 | 1911/12 | 1 | – | – | - | - | – | – | Brother of Thomas Drew. |
| Thomas Drew | 1897/98 | 1897/98 | 3 | – | – | - | – | – | – | Brother of Charles Drew. |
| Richard Drewer | 1974/75 | 1975/76 | 14 | 1975/76 | 1975/76 | 2 | – | – | – | |
| John Ducker | 1952/53 | 1962/63 | 30 | – | – | - | – | – | – | |
| Robert Dugan | 1978/79 | 1981/82 | 5 | – | – | - | – | – | – | |
| Lance Duldig | 1940/41 | 1952/53 | 40 | – | – | - | – | – | – | |
| Chris Duval | 2009/10 | 2010/11 | 5 | 2004/2005 | 2010/11 | 9 | – | – | - | |
| Robert Dyer | 1893/94 | 1895/96 | 8 | – | – | - | – | – | – | |
| Mark Eaton | 1976/77 | 1976/77 | 3 | – | – | - | - | – | – | |
| Ben Edmondson | 2010/11 | 2010/11 | 7 | 2010/11 | 2010/11 | 10 | 2010/11 | 2010/11 | 2 | |
| Allen Edwards | 1892/93 | 1892/93 | 1 | – | – | - | – | – | – | |
| Frederick Edwards | 1934/35 | 1934/35 | 5 | – | – | - | – | – | – | |
| Andrew Eime | 1996/97 | 1998/99 | 4 | 1997/98 | 1998/99 | 5 | – | – | – | |
| Matthew Elliott | 2005/06 | 2007/08 | 20 | 2005/06 | 2007/08 | 25 | – | – | – | |
| Reginald Ellis | 1945/46 | 1945/46 | 1 | – | – | - | – | – | – | |
| Alfred Eneberg | 1951/52 | 1951/52 | 1 | – | – | - | – | – | – | |
| Ernest England | 1950/51 | 1951/52 | 5 | – | – | - | – | – | – | |
| William Englefield | 1946/47 | 1946/47 | 4 | – | – | - | – | – | – | |
| Laurence Evan | 1885/86 | 1890/91 | 2 | – | – | - | – | – | – | |
| Arthur Evans | 1895/96 | 1903/04 | 18 | – | – | - | – | – | – | |
| Richard Evans | 1892/93 | 1892/93 | 1 | – | – | - | – | – | – | |
| Graeme Farrell | 1966/67 | 1966/67 | 7 | – | – | - | – | – | – | |
| Martin Faull | 1990/91 | 1998/99 | 30 | 1991/92 | 1998/99 | 9 | – | – | – | |
| Alan Favell | 1983/84 | 1983/84 | 1 | – | – | - | – | – | – | Son of Les Favell. |
| Les Favell | 1951/52 | 1969/70 | 143 | 1969/70 | 1969/70 | 1 | – | – | – | Father of Alan Favell. |
| Callum Ferguson | 2004/05 | 2014/15 | 84 | 2002/03 | 2014/15 | 75 | 2005/06 | 2011/12 | 29 | |
| John Ferris | 1895/96 | 1895/96 | 1 | – | – | – | – | – | – | Played Test cricket for Australian and England. |
| Noel Fielke | 1992/93 | 1992/93 | 5 | 1992/93 | 1992/93 | 3 | – | – | – | |
| Harry Fisher | 1920/21 | 1923/24 | 8 | – | - | - | – | – | – | |
| David Fitzgerald | 1996/97 | 2003/04 | 63 | 1997/98 | 2002/03 | 41 | – | – | – | |
| Damien Fleming | 2002/03 | 2002/03 | 2 | 2002/03 | 2002/03 | 3 | – | – | – | |
| Andrew Flower | 2003/04 | 2003/04 | 7 | 2003/04 | 2003/04 | 6 | – | – | – | |
| Craig Francis | 1989/90 | 1989/90 | 1 | – | – | - | – | – | – | |
| Robert Fraser | 1974/75 | 1978/79 | 7 | – | – | - | – | – | – | |
| Eric Freeman | 1964/65 | 1973/74 | 44 | 1970/71 | 1973/74 | 8 | – | – | – | Also played Australian rules football for Port Adelaide. |
| John Frick | 1976/77 | 1976/77 | 4 | - | – | - | – | – | – | Also played Australian rules football for North Adelaide |
| Allan Frost | 1965/66 | 1967/68 | 24 | – | – | - | – | – | – | |
| Paul Galloway | 1968/69 | 1969/70 | 11 | 1969/70 | 1969/70 | 1 | - | – | – | |
| Joel Garner | 1982/83 | 1982/83 | 8 | 1982/83 | 1982/83 | 2 | – | – | – | |
| Rodney Gehan | 1962/63 | 1962/63 | 1 | – | – | - | - | – | – | |
| Algy Gehrs | 1902/03 | 1920/21 | 49 | – | - | - | - | – | – | Also played Australian rules football for North Adelaide and South Adelaide Football Clubs. |
| Steve Gentle | 1978/79 | 1983/84 | 2 | – | – | - | – | – | – | |
| Peter George | 2008/09 | 2013/14 | 36 | 2008/09 | 2013/14 | 15 | – | – | - | |
| Shane George | 1987/88 | 1997/98 | 53 | 1987/88 | 1998/99 | 22 | – | – | – | |
| Charles Gibbs | 1877/78 | 1877/78 | 1 | – | – | - | – | – | – | |
| Lance Gibbs | 1969/70 | 1969/70 | 8 | 1969/70 | 1 | | – | – | – | |
| Vincent Gibson | 1939/40 | 1946/47 | 8 | – | – | - | – | – | – | |
| George Giffen | 1887/88 | 1903/04 | 64 | – | – | - | – | – | – | Brother of Walter Giffen. Also played Australian rules football for Norwood Football Club. |
| Walter Giffen | 1882/83 | 1901/02 | 31 | – | – | - | – | – | – | Brother of George Giffen. Also played Australian rules football for Norwood Football Club. |
| Robert Gilbourne | 1967/68 | 1971/72 | 11 | 1969/70 | 1969/70 | 1 | - | – | – | |
| Len Giles | 1950/51 | 1951/52 | 5 | – | – | – | – | – | – | |
| Jason Gillespie | 1994/95 | 2007/08 | 58 | 1994/95 | 2007/08 | 54 | 2007/08 | 2007/08 | 3 | First known Aboriginal Australian to represent Australia. |
| Peter Gladigau | 1985/86 | 1992/93 | 39 | 1986/87 | 1992/93 | 22 | - | – | – | |
| Charles Godfrey | 1885/86 | 1888/89 | 5 | – | – | - | - | - | – | |
| Keith Gogler | 1946/47 | 1948/49 | 9 | – | – | - | - | – | – | |
| Benjamin Goode | 1945/46 | 1949/50 | 3 | – | – | – | – | – | – | |
| Henry Gooden | 1877/78 | 1880/81 | 3 | – | - | – | – | – | – | Brother of James Gooden. |
| James Gooden | 1880/81 | 1892/93 | 10 | – | – | – | – | – | – | Brother of Henry Gooden. |
| Leslie Gooden | 1912/13 | 1913/14 | 2 | - | - | – | – | – | – | |
| James Goodfellow | 1880/81 | 1880/81 | 1 | – | – | – | – | – | – | Brother of George Goodfellow. |
| Gary Goodman | 1980/81 | 1980/81 | 4 | 1980/81 | 1980/81 | 1 | – | – | – | |
| Fred Gould | 1922/23 | 1924/25 | 7 | – | – | – | – | – | – | |
| Hector Grant | 1956/57 | 1956/57 | 2 | – | – | – | – | – | – | |
| Cecil Gray | 1921/22 | 1922/23 | 2 | – | – | – | – | – | – | |
| Albert Green | 1894/95 | 1898/99 | 7 | – | – | – | – | – | – | Also played Australian rules football for Norwood |
| Alex Gregory | - | - | - | 2014/15 | 2014/15 | 6 | – | – | – | |
| Donald Gregg | 1954/55 | 1956/57 | 15 | – | – | – | – | – | – | |
| George Griffiths | 1965/66 | 1966/67 | 10 | – | – | – | – | – | – | |
| Clarrie Grimmett | 1924/25 | 1940/41 | 105 | – | – | - | – | – | – | |
| Brian Grove | 1952/53 | 1952/53 | 3 | – | – | – | – | – | – | |
| Lancelot Gun | 1924/25 | 1926/27 | 8 | – | – | - | – | – | – | |
| Gordon Gurr | 1905/06 | 1905/06 | 1 | – | – | – | – | – | – | Also played Australian rules football for Sturt Football Club. |
| Jake Haberfield | 2008/09 | 2012/13 | 16 | 2008/09 | 2012/13 | 29 | 2009/10 | 2010/11 | 2 | |
| Alfred Hack | 1927/28 | 1931/32 | 22 | – | – | – | – | – | – | Son of Frederick Hack and brother of Reginald Hack. |
| Frederick Hack | 1898/99 | 1908/09 | 39 | – | – | – | – | – | – | Father of Alfred and Reginald Hack. |
| Reginald Hack | 1933/34 | 1933/34 | 1 | – | – | – | – | – | – | Son of Frederick Hack and brother of Alfred Hack. |
| Ron Haddrick | 1951/52 | 1952/53 | 3 | – | – | – | – | – | – | |
| John Halbert | 1961/62 | 1961/62 | 2 | – | – | – | – | – | – | Also played Australian rules football for Sturt Football Club. |
| Ron Halcombe | 1926/27 | 1927/28 | 5 | – | – | – | – | – | – | |
| Harry Haldane | 1886/87 | 1893/94 | 11 | – | – | – | - | – | – | |
| Jesse Hall | 2013/14 | 2014/15 | 21 | – | – | - | 2013/14 | – | 5 | Cousin of Shaun Tait |- |
| Ron Hamence | 1935/36 | 1950/51 | 69 | – | – | - | – | – | – | Cousin of Charlie Walker. |
| Ashley Hammond | 1992/93 | 1992/93 | 2 | – | – | – | – | – | – | Son of Jeff Hammond. |
| Jeff Hammond | 1969/70 | 1980/81 | 46 | 1970/71 | 1980/81 | 13 | – | – | – | Father of Ashley Hammond. |
| Anthony Handrickan | 1976/77 | 1977/78 | 8 | 1977/78 | 1983/84 | 2 | – | – | – | |
| Leopole Hanson | 1905/06 | 1905/06 | 3 | – | – | – | – | – | - | |
| Chris Harms | 1982/83 | 1985/86 | 14 | – | – | – | – | – | – | |
| David Harris | 1953/54 | 1959/60 | 25 | – | – | - | – | – | – | |
| Daniel Harris | 1999/2000 | 2011/12 | 58 | 2004/05 | 2010/11 | 42 | 2006/07 | 2010/11 | 30 | |
| Gordon Harris | 1920/21 | 1930/31 | 27 | – | – | – | – | – | – | |
| Kim Harris | 1981/82 | 1983/84 | 11 | 1982/83 | 1982/83 | 1 | – | – | – | |
| Ryan Harris | 2001/02 | 2007/08 | 26 | 2000/01 | 2007/08 | 44 | 2006/07 | 2007/08 | 9 | |
| Colin Harrison | 1966/67 | 1966/67 | 4 | – | – | - | – | – | – | |
| Mark Harrity | 1992/93 | 2002/03 | 67 | 1995/96 | 2002/03 | 41 | – | – | – | |
| Neil Hawke | 1960/61 | 1967/68 | 60 | – | – | – | – | – | – | Also played Australian rules football for Port Adelaide, West Torrens and East Perth Football Clubs. |
| Henry Hay | 1902/03 | 1903/04 | 5 | – | – | - | – | – | – | |
| Michael Haysman | 1982/83 | 1987/88 | 35 | 1982/83 | 1984/85 | 9 | – | – | – | |
| Charles Hayward | 1891/92 | 1891/92 | 3 | – | – | – | – | – | – | |
| Lindsay Head | 1957/58 | 1958/59 | 9 | – | – | – | – | – | – | Also played Australian rules football for West Torrens. |
| Travis Head | 2011/12 | 2014/15 | 32 | 2012/13 | 2014/15 | 9 | – | – | – | |
| Herbert Heairfield | 1940/41 | 1940/41 | 1 | – | – | – | – | – | – | |
| Henry Heath | 1923/24 | 1923/24 | 3 | – | – | – | – | – | – | |
| Anthony Heidrich | – | – | - | 1993/94 | 1993/94 | 1 | – | – | – | |
| Michael Hendricks | 1970/71 | 1974/75 | 32 | 1971/72 | 1974/75 | 7 | – | – | – | |
| Donald Henry | 1920/21 | 1920/21 | 3 | – | – | – | – | – | – | |
| Peter Herbert | 1971/72 | 1971/72 | 4 | – | - | – | – | – | – | |
| William Hewer | 1898/99 | 1910/11 | 7 | – | - | – | – | – | – | |
| Denis Hickey | 1990/91 | 1994/95 | 29 | 1990/91 | 1991/92 | 3 | – | – | – | |
| Jesse Hide | 1880/81 | 1882/83 | 4 | – | – | – | – | – | – | Brother of Arthur Hide. |
| Barry Hiern | 1972/73 | 1973/74 | 13 | 1973/74 | 1973/74 | 2 | – | – | – | Son of Ross Hiern. |
| Ross Hiern | 1949/50 | 1953/54 | 12 | - | – | - | – | – | – | Father of Barry Hiern. |
| Ben Higgins | 2000/01 | 2002/03 | 15 | 2000/01 | 2001/02 | 7 | – | – | – | Also played Australian rules football for Port Adelaide and Woodville-West Torrens Football Clubs. |
| Mark Higgs | 2002/03 | 2003/04 | 16 | 2002/03 | 2005/06 | 26 | – | – | – | |
| Andrew Hilditch | 1982/83 | 1991/92 | 102 | 1983/84 | 1991/92 | 28 | – | – | – | |
| Arthur Hill | 1889/90 | 1893/94 | 5 | - | – | – | – | – | – | Brother of Clem, Henry, Leslie, Percival and Stanley Hill. |
| Clem Hill | 1892/93 | 1922/23 | 87 | – | – | - | – | – | – | Brother of Arthur, Henry, Leslie, Percival and Stanley Hill. |
| Henry Hill | 1903/04 | 1903/04 | 1 | | | | – | – | – | Brother of Arthur, Clem, Leslie, Percival and Stanley Hill. |
| Leslie Hill | 1905/06 | 1910/11 | 18 | – | – | – | – | – | – | Brother of Arthur, Clem, Henry, Percival and Stanley Hill. |
| Leon Hill | 1958/59 | 1960/61 | 15 | – | – | – | – | – | – | |
| Percival Hill | 1892/93 | 1892/93 | 1 | – | – | – | – | – | – | Brother of Arthur, Clem, Henry, Leslie and Stanley Hill. |
| Peter Hill | 1949/50 | 1949/50 | 1 | – | – | – | – | – | – | |
| Roland Hill | 1893/94 | 1893/94 | 1 | – | – | – | – | – | – | |
| Stanley Hill | 1909/10 | 1911/12 | 11 | – | – | – | – | – | – | Brother of Arthur, Clem, Henry, Leslie and Percival Hill. |
| Ernest Hiscock | 1890/91 | 1893/94 | 4 | – | – | – | – | – | – | |
| Alan Hitchcox | 1958/59 | 1959/60 | 11 | – | – | – | – | – | – | |
| Malcolm Hodge | 1960/61 | 1960/61 | 6 | – | – | – | – | – | – | |
| Rodney Hogg | 1975/76 | 1983/84 | 39 | 1977/78 | 1983/84 | 10 | – | – | – | |
| Graeme Hole | 1950/51 | 1957/58 | 51 | – | – | – | – | – | – | |
| Raymond Holman | 1940/41 | 1940/41 | 1 | – | – | – | – | – | – | |
| Leslie Holton | 1929/30 | 1932/33 | 2 | – | – | – | – | – | – | |
| Robert Homburg | 1896/97 | 1898/99 | 2 | – | – | – | – | – | – | |
| Brian Hone | 1928/29 | 1929/30 | 11 | – | – | – | – | – | – | Brother of Garton Hone and father of David Hone. |
| Garton Hone | 1919/20 | 1919/20 | 1 | – | – | – | – | – | – | Brother of Brian Hone. |
| Ben Hook | 1997/98 | 1997/98 | 1 | – | – | – | – | – | – | |
| David Hookes | 1975/76 | 1991/92 | 136 | 1975/76 | 1991/92 | 42 | – | – | – | |
| John Horley | 1960/61 | 1960/61 | 1 | – | – | – | – | – | – | |
| Jack Horsell | 1937/38 | 1938/39 | 2 | – | – | – | – | – | – | |
| Kenneth Horsnell | 1953/54 | 1960/61 | 16 | – | – | – | – | – | – | |
| Graham House | 1974/75 | 1974/75 | 2 | – | – | – | – | – | – | |
| Leonard Howard | 1908/09 | 1913/14 | 6 | – | – | – | – | – | – | |
| Phil Hughes | 2012/13 | 2014/15 | 15 | 2012/13 | 2014/15 | 6 | – | – | – | |
| Victor Hugo | 1897/98 | 1899/1900 | 9 | – | – | – | – | – | – | |
| Brian Hurn | 1957 58 | 1966/67 | 31 | – | – | – | – | – | – | Grandfather of Shannon Hurn. |
| Paul Hutchison | 1991/92 | 1994/95 | 5 | 1992/93 | 1994/95 | 7 | – | – | – | |
| Henry Hutton | 1905/06 | 1905/06 | 1 | – | – | – | – | – | – | |
| Mervyn Hutton | 1930/31 | 1930/31 | 1 | – | – | – | – | – | – | |
| Maurice Hutton | 1928/29 | 1928/29 | 2 | – | – | – | – | – | – | Son of William Hutton and brother of Harvey Hutton. Also played Australian rules football for Sturt. |
| Harvey Hutton | 1934/35 | 1934/35 | 2 | – | – | – | – | – | – | Son of William Hutton and brother of Maurice Hutton. |
| William Hutton | 1905/06 | 1905/06 | 1 | – | – | – | – | – | – | Father of Harvey and Maurice Hutton. |
| Brian Illman | 1960/61 | 1960/61 | 6 | – | – | – | – | – | – | |
| Gordon Inkster | 1926/27 | 1927/28 | 6 | – | – | – | – | – | – | Also played Australian rules football for Port Adelaide Football Club. |
| John Inverarity | 1979/80 | 1984/85 | 53 | 1979/80 | 1983/84 | 9 | – | – | – | Son of Mervyn Inverarity. |
| Alec James | 1914/15 | 1914/15 | 4 | – | – | – | – | – | – | |
| Ron James | 1946/47 | 1947/48 | 16 | – | – | - | – | – | – | |
| Dudley Jamieson | 1931/32 | 1932/33 | 8 | – | – | – | – | – | – | |
| Barry Jarman | 1955/56 | 1968/69 | 94 | – | – | – | – | – | – | |
| Fred Jarvis | 1889/90 | 1905/06 | 56 | – | – | – | – | – | – | Brother of Affie Jarvis. |
| Affie Jarvis | 1877/78 | 1900/01 | 42 | - | - | - | – | – | – | Brother of Fred Jarvis and father of Harwood Jarvis. |
| Harwood Jarvis | 1905/06 | 1905/06 | 2 | – | – | – | – | – | – | Son of Affie Jarvis. |
| Terry Jenner | 1967/68 | 1976/77 | 77 | 1969/70 | 1975/76 | 11 | – | – | – | |
| Claude Jennings | 1902/03 | 1907/08 | 21 | – | – | – | – | – | – | |
| Ben Johnson | 1994/95 | 2002/03 | 69 | 1994/95 | 2003/04 | 60 | – | – | – | |
| Eric Johnson | 1926/27 | 1929/30 | 6 | – | – | – | – | – | – | Also played Australian rules football for Norwood. |
| David Johnston | 1978/79 | 1982/83 | 10 | 1982/83 | 1989/90 | 18 | – | – | – | Also played Australian rules football for Glenelg. Son of Bill Johnston. |
| Harvey Jolly | 1987/88 | 1987/88 | 8 | – | – | – | – | – | – | |
| Ernie Jones | 1892/93 | 1902/03 | 47 | – | – | – | – | – | – | Also played Australian rules football for North Adelaide, Port Adelaide and South Adelaide Football Clubs. Uncle of Arthur Richter. |
| William Jones | 1881/82 | 1883/84 | 2 | – | – | – | – | – | – | |
| Tony Jose | 1947/48 | 1947/48 | 3 | – | – | – | – | – | – | Son of Gilbert Jose. |
| Gilbert Jose | 1918/19 | 1921/22 | 2 | – | – | – | – | – | – | Father of Tony Jose. |
| Huntley Kekwick | 1899/1900 | 1899/1900 | 2 | – | – | – | – | – | – | Father-in-law of Tim Wall. |
| David Kelly | 1984/85 | 1986/87 | 19 | 1984/85 | 1986/87 | 4 | – | – | – | |
| Trent Kelly | 2004/05 | 2012/13 | 3 | 2003/04 | 2005/06 | 4 | 2005/06 | 2006/07 | 4 | |
| Matthew Kelton | 1997/98 | 1997/98 | 2 | – | – | – | – | – | – | |
| Charles Kemp | 1884/85 | 1887/88 | 4 | – | – | – | – | – | – | |
| Cornelius Kenneally | 1949/50 | 1949/50 | 2 | – | – | – | – | – | – | |
| John Kierse | 1939/40 | 1939/40 | 1 | - | – | - | – | – | – | |
| Chris Killen | 1987/88 | 1988/89 | 5 | 1987/88 | 1987/88 | 3 | – | – | – | |
| Adam Kimber | 1996/97 | 1996/97 | 2 | – | – | – | – | – | – | |
| James King | 1877/78 | 1884/85 | 8 | – | – | – | – | – | – | |
| Matthew King | – | – | - | 2001/02 | 2001/02 | 1 | – | – | – | |
| Norman King | 1949/50 | 1950/51 | 5 | – | – | – | – | – | – | |
| Harold Kirkwood | 1901/02 | 1913/14 | 13 | – | – | – | – | – | – | |
| Eugene Kitson | 1912/13 | 1912/13 | 1 | – | – | – | – | – | – | |
| Michael Klinger | 2008/09 | 2013/14 | 57 | 2008/09 | 2013/14 | 51 | 2008/09 | 2010/11 | 17 | |
| Tom Klose | 1939/40 | 1949/50 | 25 | – | – | – | – | – | – | |
| William Knill | 1880/81 | 1887/88 | 6 | – | – | – | – | – | – | |
| Jeff Kowalick | 1966/67 | 1966/67 | 1 | – | – | – | – | – | – | |
| Daryl Lambert | 1976/77 | 1977/78 | 6 | – | – | – | – | – | – | |
| Tim Lang | 2010/11 | 2010/11 | 2 | 2010/11 | 2010/11 | 1 | – | – | – | |
| Gil Langley | 1945/46 | 1956/57 | 55 | – | – | – | – | – | – | Also played Australian rules football for Essendon and Sturt football clubs. |
| Jeff Langley | 1969/70 | 1979/80 | 6 | 1970/71 | 1978/99 | 2 | – | – | – | Nephew of Gil Langley. |
| Trent Lawford | 2013/14 | 2014/15 | 7 | 2014/15 | 2014/15 | 2 | – | – | – | |
| Henry Laycock | 1931/32 | 1931/32 | 1 | – | – | – | – | – | – | |
| Brian Leak | 1935/36 | 1940/41 | 8 | – | – | – | – | – | – | Also played Australian rules football for Sturt. |
| Ernest Leak | 1895/96 | 1909/10 | 12 | – | – | – | – | – | – | |
| Stanley Leak | 1912/13 | 1912/13 | 1 | – | – | – | – | – | – | |
| Bob Lee | 1956/57 | 1959/60 | 3 | – | – | – | – | – | – | Also played Australian rules football for West Adelaide Football Club. |
| Philip Lee | 1925/26 | 1934/35 | 50 | – | – | - | – | – | – | Also played Australian rules football for Norwood. |
| Darren Lehmann | 1987/88 | 2007/08 | 127 | 1988/89 | 2007/08 | 90 | 2005/06 | 2006/07 | 6 | |
| Jake Lehmann | 2014/15 | 2014/15 | 2 | 2014/15 | 2014/15 | 4 | - | - | - | |
| Graham Levy | 1961/62 | 1961/62 | 1 | – | – | – | – | – | – | |
| Keith Lewis | 1948/49 | 1949/50 | 8 | – | – | - | – | – | – | |
| Kevin Lewis | 1981/82 | 1981/82 | 3 | – | – | - | – | – | – | |
| Lawrence Lewis | 1926/27 | 1926/27 | 2 | – | – | - | – | – | – | |
| John Lill | 1955/56 | 1965/66 | 64 | – | – | - | – | – | – | Also played Australian rules football for Norwood. |
| George Liston | 1887/88 | 1887/88 | 1 | – | – | - | – | – | – | |
| Bob Lloyd | 1960/61 | 1966/67 | 16 | – | – | - | – | – | – | |
| Roy Lonergan | 1929/30 | 1934/35 | 39 | – | – | - | – | – | – | |
| David Lovell | 1980/81 | 1980/81 | 3 | – | – | - | – | – | – | |
| Eustace Loveridge | 1920/21 | 1922/23 | 5 | – | – | - | – | – | – | |
| Frank Lucas | 1919/20 | 1919/20 | 3 | – | – | - | – | – | – | |
| Thomas Lucas | 1877/78 | 1877/78 | 1 | – | – | - | – | – | – | |
| Tim Ludeman | 2009/10 | 2016/17 | 47 | 2009/10 | 2016/17 | 36 | 2009/10 | 2010/11 | 4 | |
| Nathan Lyon | 2010/11 | 2012/13 | 11 | 2010/11 | 2012/13 | 9 | 2010/11 | 2010/11 | 7 | |
| Jack Lyons | 1884/85 | 1899/1900 | 47 | – | – | - | – | – | – | |
| Donald McAllister | 1964/65 | 1964/65 | 3 | – | – | - | – | – | – | |
| Arthur McBeath | 1906/07 | 1907/08 | 5 | – | – | - | – | – | – | |
| Kevin McCarthy | 1964/65 | 1972/73 | 37 | 1969/70 | 1972/73 | 5 | – | – | – | Also played Australian rules football for Glenelg |
| Raymond McCormick | 1959/60 | 1959/60 | 6 | – | – | – | – | – | – | |
| Rod McCurdy | 1984/85 | 1984/85 | 9 | 1984/85 | 1984/85 | 2 | – | – | – | |
| Andrew McDonald | 2013/14 | 2014/15 | 4 | 2013/14 | 2014/15 | 4 | – | – | – | Brother of Brenton McDonald. |
| Brenton McDonald | – | – | - | 2013/14 | 2013/14 | 2 | – | – | – | Brother of Andrew McDonald. |
| Peter McIntyre | 1992/93 | 2001/02 | 68 | 1993/94 | 2000/01 | 5 | – | – | – | |
| Douglas McKay | 1925/26 | 1928/29 | 10 | – | - | – | – | – | – | |
| Henry McKay | 1912/13 | 1912/13 | 3 | – | – | – | – | – | – | |
| John McKenzie | 1884/85 | 1901/02 | 22 | – | – | – | – | – | – | |
| Ian McLachlan | 1960/61 | 1963/64 | 31 | – | – | – | – | – | – | Brother of Angus McLachlan. |
| Bob McLean | 1945/46 | 1950/51 | 20 | – | – | - | - | – | – | Also played Australian rules football for Port Adelaide and Norwood football clubs. Father of Ian McLean. |
| Ian McLean | 1976/77 | 1982/83 | 23 | 1982/83 | 1982/83 | 1 | - | – | – | Son of Bob McLean. |
| Ross McLellan | 1979/80 | 1981/82 | 3 | – | – | - | - | – | – | |
| Donald McRae | 1906/07 | 1906/07 | 3 | – | – | - | - | – | – | |
| William Magarey | 1890/91 | 1890/91 | 1 | – | – | - | - | – | – | |
| Ashley Mallett | 1967/68 | 1980/81 | 91 | 1970/71 | 1980/81 | 15 | – | – | – | |
| John Mann | 1945/46 | 1946/47 | 7 | – | – | - | - | – | – | |
| John Manning | 1951/52 | 1953/54 | 19 | – | – | - | - | – | - | |
| Graham Manou | 1999/2000 | 2010/11 | 99 | 1999/2000 | 2010/11 | 109 | 2005/06 | 2010/11 | 34 | |
| Lynn Marks | 1965/66 | 1965/66 | 9 | – | – | - | - | – | – | Son of Alec Marks and brother of Neil Marks. |
| Daniel Marsh | 1993/94 | 1993/94 | 4 | 1993/94 | 1995/96 | 12 | - | – | – | Son of Rod Marsh. |
| Charles Martin | 1895/96 | 1895/96 | 3 | – | – | - | - | – | – | |
| Johnny Martin | 1958/59 | 1958/59 | 9 | – | – | - | - | – | - | |
| Shane Martin | – | – | – | 1993/94 | 1997/98 | 2 | - | – | – | |
| Rick Massey | 1983/84 | 1983/84 | 2 | 1983/84 | 1983/84 | 1 | - | – | – | |
| James Matthews | 1900/01 | 1901/02 | 7 | – | – | - | - | – | – | Also played Australian rules football for North Adelaide. |
| Tim May | 1984/85 | 1995/96 | 89 | 1986/87 | 1995/96 | 29 | – | – | – | |
| Edgar Mayne | 1906/07 | 1914/15 | 37 | – | – | – | – | – | – | |
| Joe Mennie | 2011/12 | 2014/15 | 28 | 2011/12 | 2012/13 | 13 | - | – | – | |
| Leonard Michael | 1939/40 | 1951/52 | 21 | – | – | - | – | – | – | |
| Roy Middleton | 1912/13 | 1914/15 | 5 | – | – | - | – | – | – | |
| Colin Miller | 1988/89 | 1991/92 | 22 | 1988/89 | 1990/91 | 5 | – | – | – | |
| Mick Miller | 2000/01 | 2003/04 | 16 | 2000/01 | 2004/05 | 20 | - | – | – | |
| Sam Miller | 2012/13 | 2012/13 | 3 | 2013/14 | 2013/14 | 6 | – | – | – | |
| Matthew Minagall | 1990/91 | 1997/98 | 13 | – | – | - | - | – | – | |
| Brian Mitchell | 1978/79 | 1978/79 | 4 | – | – | - | - | – | – | |
| Tom Moffat | 2010/11 | 2010/11 | 4 | – | – | - | - | – | – | |
| William Moffat | 1877/78 | 1877/78 | 1 | – | – | - | - | – | – | |
| Henry Moore | 1891/92 | 1891/92 | 1 | – | – | - | - | – | – | |
| Robert Moroney | 1920/21 | 1920/21 | 1 | – | – | - | - | – | – | |
| Frank Morton | 1921/22 | 1922/23 | 5 | – | – | - | - | – | – | |
| Johnny Moyes | 1912/13 | 1914/15 | 13 | – | – | - | - | – | – | |
| Charles Moyle | 1910/11 | 1910/11 | 2 | - | – | - | - | – | – | |
| Ross Moyle | 1933/34 | 1939/40 | 15 | – | – | - | - | – | – | |
| Mervyn Mueller | 1937/38 | 1937/38 | 2 | – | – | - | - | – | - | |
| David Mundy | 1969/70 | 1969/70 | 2 | - | – | - | - | – | – | |
| James Munting | 2013/14 | 2013/14 | 1 | – | – | - | - | – | – | |
| John Murray | 1911/12 | 1925/26 | 48 | – | – | - | - | – | – | |
| John Musgrove | 1887/88 | 1887/88 | 3 | – | – | - | - | – | – | |
| Howard Mutton | 1959/60 | 1959/60 | 5 | – | – | - | - | – | – | |
| Jack Nash | 1970/71 | 1980/81 | 51 | 1973/74 | 1979/80 | 7 | - | – | – | Also played Australian rules football for Norwood. |
| Phil Newland | 1899/1900 | 1905/06 | 16 | – | – | - | - | – | – | Also played Australian rules football for Norwood. |
| Richard Niehuus | 1946/47 | 1947/48 | 10 | – | – | - | - | – | – | |
| Tim Nielsen | 1990/91 | 1998/99 | 99 | 1991/92 | 1998/99 | 48 | - | – | – | |
| Jack Nitschke | 1929/30 | 1934/35 | 41 | – | – | - | - | – | – | |
| Paul Nobes | 1988/89 | 1995/96 | 70 | 1988/89 | 1995/96 | 28 | | | | |
| Geff Noblet | 1945/46 | 1952/53 | 49 | – | – | - | – | – | – | |
| John Noel | 1880/81 | 1894/95 | 15 | – | – | - | – | – | – | |
| Aaron O'Brien | 2008/09 | 2011/12 | 29 | 2008/09 | 2011/12 | 37 | 2008/09 | 2010/11 | 20 | |
| Tom O'Connell | 1935/36 | 1935/36 | 6 | – | – | - | – | – | – | |
| Don O'Connor | 1983/84 | 1987/88 | 33 | 1981/82 | 1987/88 | 17 | – | – | – | |
| Jack O'Connor | 1906/07 | 1909/10 | 15 | – | – | – | – | – | – | |
| Patrick Ohlstrom | 1923/24 | 1923/24 | 1 | – | – | – | – | – | – | |
| Kevin O'Neill | 1946/47 | 1949/50 | 18 | – | – | – | – | – | – | |
| Jim Osborn | 1953/54 | 1954/55 | 2 | – | – | – | – | – | – | |
| Bob O'Shannassy | 1976/77 | 1976/77 | 4 | 1981/82 | 1981/82 | 1 | – | – | – | Also played Australian Rules Football for North Adelaide |
| Norman Oswald | 1936/37 | 1949/50 | 12 | – | - | – | – | – | – | |
| Chris Owen | 1989/90 | 1991/92 | 8 | 1991/92 | 1993/94 | 3 | – | – | – | |
| George Palmer | 1924/25 | 1929/30 | 9 | – | – | – | – | – | – | |
| Jack Palmer | 1932/33 | 1932/33 | 1 | – | – | - | – | – | – | |
| Geoff Parker | 1996/97 | 1998/99 | 19 | 1006/97 | 1998/99 | 15 | – | – | – | Also played Australian rules football for Essendon and South Adelaide Football Clubs. |
| Ronald Parker | 1933/34 | 1936/37 | 13 | – | – | - | – | – | – | |
| Russ Parker | 1974/75 | 1978/79 | 9 | – | – | – | – | – | – | |
| George Parkin | 1889/90 | 1893/94 | 7 | – | – | – | – | – | – | |
| Sam Parkinson | 1981/82 | 1987/88 | 36 | 1981/82 | 1986/87 | 10 | – | – | – | |
| Cyril Parry | 1925/26 | 1930/31 | 10 | – | – | - | – | – | – | |
| Trevor Pearson | 1969/70 | 1969/70 | 3 | – | – | - | – | – | – | |
| Arthur Pellew | 1900/01 | 1900/01 | 2 | – | – | - | – | – | – | Brother of John Pellew and cousin of Nip and Lance Pellew. |
| Nip Pellew | 1913/14 | 1928/29 | 23 | – | – | - | – | – | – | Brother of Lance Pellew and cousin of Arthur and John Pellew. |
| John Pellew | 1903/04 | 1908/09 | 21 | – | – | - | – | – | – | Brother of Arthur Pellew and cousin of Nip and Lance Pellew. |
| Lance Pellew | 1919/20 | 1922/23 | 10 | – | – | - | – | – | – | Brother of Nip Pellew and cousin of Athur and John Pellew. |
| Arthur Peters | 1898/99 | 1898/99 | 3 | – | – | - | – | – | – | |
| Aldam Pettinger | 1880/81 | 1880/81 | 1 | - | – | - | – | – | – | |
| Edward Phillips | 1877/78 | 1889/90 | 6 | - | – | - | – | – | – | |
| Edward Phillips | 1919/20 | 1920/21 | 3 | – | – | - | – | – | – | |
| Wayne Phillips | 1977/78 | 1990/91 | 69 | 1977/78 | 1990/91 | 28 | – | – | – | |
| Kelby Pickering | 1997/98 | 1997/98 | 1 | 1997/98 | 1997/98 | 3 | – | - | – | |
| Colin Pinch | 1950/51 | 1959/60 | 61 | – | – | - | – | – | – | |
| Brian Pittman | 1959/60 | 1959/60 | 1 | – | – | - | – | – | – | |
| Tom Plant | 2004/05 | 2008/09 | 13 | 2004/05 | 2004/05 | 1 | – | – | – | |
| Neil Plummer | 1985/86 | 1989/90 | 5 | – | – | - | – | – | – | |
| Kieron Pollard | – | – | – | – | – | - | 2009/10 | 2010/11 | 10 | |
| Louis Power | 1926/27 | 1926/27 | 2 | – | – | - | – | – | – | Brother of Laurence Power. |
| Laurence Power | 1920/21 | 1920/21 | 1 | – | – | - | – | – | – | Brother of Louis Power. |
| Alfred Pretty | 1908/09 | 1908/09 | 1 | – | – | - | – | – | – | |
| Walter Price | 1913/14 | 1913/14 | 1 | – | – | - | – | – | – | |
| Wayne Prior | 1974/75 | 1984/85 | 48 | 1975/76 | 1984/85 | 10 | – | – | – | |
| Dave Pritchard | 1918/19 | 1931/32 | 49 | – | – | – | – | – | – | |
| Max Puckett | 1964/65 | 1964/65 | 1 | - | – | – | – | – | – | Son of Charlie Puckett. |
| Gary Putland | 2009/10 | 2014/15 | 26 | 2005/06 | 2015/16 | 35 | 2005/06 | 2010/11 | 14 | |
| James Pyke | 1985/86 | 1987/88 | 13 | 1985/86 | 1987/88 | 14 | – | – | – | Also played Australian rules football for Norwood. |
| Ernest Pynor | 1948/49 | 1949/50 | 3 | – | – | - | – | – | – | |
| Brian Quigley | 1958/59 | 1960/61 | 11 | – | – | - | – | – | – | |
| John Quilty | 1881/82 | 1882/83 | 2 | – | – | - | – | – | – | |
| Karl Quist | 1908/09 | 1911/12 | 7 | – | – | - | – | – | – | Father of Adrian Quist. |
| Sam Raphael | 2012/13 | 2014/15 | 14 | - | - | - | – | – | – | |
| Adil Rashid | - | – | – | - | – | - | 2010/11 | 2011/12 | 8 | |
| Phillip Rebbeck | 1971/72 | 1971/72 | 5 | 1971/72 | 1971/72 | 2 | – | – | – | |
| John Reedman | 1887/88 | 1908/09 | 76 | – | – | – | – | – | – | Also played Australian rules football for North Adelaide and South Adelaide football clubs. |
| John Rees | 1905/06 | 1905/06 | 1 | - | – | - | – | – | – | Brother of Robert Rees. |
| Robert Rees | 1903/04 | 1912/13 | 13 | – | – | - | – | – | – | |
| Damion Reeves | 1992/93 | 1993/94 | 14 | 1992/93 | 1992/93 | 1 | – | – | – | |
| William Reid | 1892/93 | 1892/93 | 1 | – | – | - | – | – | – | |
| Barry Richards | 1970/71 | 1970/71 | 10 | 1970/71 | 1970/71 | 2 | – | – | – | |
| Thomas Richards | 1880/81 | 1883/84 | 4 | – | - | - | – | – | – | |
| Arthur Richardson | 1918/19 | 1926/27 | 45 | – | – | – | – | – | – | Brother-in-law of Leonard Bowley. |
| Joseph Richardson | 1905/06 | 1905/06 | 2 | – | – | - | – | – | – | |
| Kane Richardson | 2010/11 | 2014/15 | 15 | 2008/09 | 2014/15 | 25 | 2008/09 | 2011/12 | 7 | |
| Vic Richardson | 1918/19 | 1937/38 | 104 | – | – | – | – | – | – | Grandfather of Ian, Greg and Trevor Chappell. Also played Australian rules football for Sturt. |
| Arthur Richter | 1935/36 | 1935/36 | 1 | – | – | - | – | – | – | Nephew of Ernie Jones. |
| Kenneth Ridings | 1938/39 | 1940/41 | 19 | – | – | - | – | – | – | Brother of Phil Ridings. |
| Phil Ridings | 1937/38 | 1955/56 | 98 | – | – | - | – | – | – | Brother of Kenneth Ridings. |
| Stephen Rigaud | 1877/78 | 1877/78 | 1 | – | – | - | – | – | – | |
| Norman Riley | 1925/26 | 1925/26 | 1 | – | – | - | – | – | – | |
| David Ritossa | 1992/93 | 1992/93 | 1 | 1992/93 | 1992/93 | 1 | – | – | – | |
| Simon Roberts | – | – | – | – | – | - | 2006/07 | 2006/07 | 1 | |
| Maurice Roberts | 1937/38 | 1946/47 | 3 | – | – | - | – | – | – | |
| David Robertson | 1986/87 | 1986/87 | 4 | – | – | - | – | – | – | |
| Trevor Robertson | 1977/78 | 1979/80 | 32 | 1977/78 | 1979/80 | 4 | – | – | – | |
| Donn Robins | 1964/65 | 1966/67 | 20 | – | – | - | – | – | – | Also played Australian rules football for Sturt. |
| Ray Robinson | 1937/38 | 1937/38 | 7 | – | – | | – | – | – | |
| Barrie Robran | 1971/72 | 1971/71 | 2 | 1971/72 | 1971/72 | 1 | – | – | – | Also played Australian rules football for North Adelaide. |
| Paul Rofe | 2000/01 | 2008/09 | 64 | 2000/01 | 2007/08 | 38 | 2006/07 | 2007/08 | 4 | |
| Doug Rolfe | 1979/80 | 1980/81 | 4 | 1979/80 | 1979/80 | 1 | – | – | – | |
| Arthur Rosman | 1898/99 | 1898/99 | 1 | – | – | – | – | – | – | |
| Alex Ross | 2014/15 | 2014/15 | 3 | 2012/13 | 2014/15 | 19 | – | – | – | |
| Robert Roxby | 1954/55 | 1958/59 | 12 | – | – | – | – | – | – | |
| Joshua Rundell | 1883/84 | 1884/85 | 2 | – | – | – | – | – | – | Father of Percy Rundell. |
| Percy Rundell | 1912/13 | 1925/26 | 30 | – | – | – | – | – | – | Son of Joshua Rundell. |
| Alfred Ryan | 1925/26 | 1936/37 | 32 | – | – | – | – | – | – | Also played Australian rules football for South Adelaide. |
| Jack Rymill | 1921/22 | 1926/27 | 21 | – | – | – | – | – | – | |
| Christopher Sangster | 1927/28 | 1927/28 | 2 | – | – | – | – | – | – | Father of John Sangster. |
| John Sangster | 1961/62 | 1962/63 | 2 | – | – | – | – | – | – | Son of Christopher Sangster. |
| Murray Sargent | 1960/61 | 1960/61 | 9 | – | – | – | – | – | – | |
| Chadd Sayers | 2010/11 | 2014/15 | 27 | 2012/13 | 2014/15 | 10 | – | – | – | Son of Dean Sayers. |
| Dean Sayers | 1981/82 | 1981/82 | 3 | 1982/83 | 1982/83 | 1 | – | – | – | Father of Chadd Sayers. |
| Peter Schenscher | 1986/87 | 1986/87 | 1 | – | – | - | – | – | – | |
| Karl Schneider | 1926/27 | 1927/28 | 13 | – | - | - | – | – | – | Also played Australian rules football for Norwood. |
| Bruce Schultz | 1936/37 | 1936/37 | 2 | – | – | - | – | – | – | Son of Julius Schultz. Also played Australian rules football for Norwood. |
| Julius Schultz | 1919/20 | 1921/22 | 4 | – | – | - | – | – | – | Father of Bruce Schultz. |
| Darryl Scott | 1983/84 | 1988/89 | 4 | 1986/87 | 1989/90 | 9 | – | – | – | |
| Jack Scott | 1937/38 | 1938/39 | 5 | – | – | - | – | – | – | |
| John Scott | 1925/26 | 1928/29 | 20 | – | – | - | – | – | – | Also served as Test match umpire. |
| Bernard Scrymgour | 1890/91 | 1896/97 | 5 | – | – | - | – | – | – | |
| Joe Scuderi | 1988/89 | 1997/98 | 61 | 1988/89 | 1998/99 | 39 | – | – | – | |
| Rex Sellers | 1959/60 | 1966/67 | 39 | – | – | – | – | – | – | |
| Victor Selth | 1918/19 | 1919/20 | 2 | – | – | - | – | – | – | |
| Shahid Afridi | – | – | – | – | – | - | 2009/10 | 2009/10 | 5 | Brother of Tariq and Ashraf Afridi. |
| Duncan Sharpe | 1961/62 | 1965/66 | 14 | – | – | - | – | – | – | |
| Alan Shepherd | 1931/32 | 1934/35 | 12 | – | – | - | – | – | – | |
| Robert Shepherdson | 1935/36 | 1935/36 | 1 | - | – | - | – | – | – | |
| Neil Shepley | 1925/26 | 1925/26 | 1 | – | – | - | – | – | – | |
| Alan Shiell | 1964/65 | 1966/67 | 23 | – | – | - | – | – | – | |
| Henry Short | 1904/05 | 1904/05 | 1 | – | – | - | – | – | – | |
| Jamie Siddons | 1991/92 | 1999/2000 | 86 | 1991/92 | 1999/2000 | 45 | – | – | – | Also played Australian rules football for Sydney Swans. |
| Bob Simunsen | 1972/73 | 1972/73 | 4 | 1972/73 | 1972/73 | 1 | – | – | – | Also played Australian rules football for Woodville Football Club. |
| Andrew Sincock | 1974/75 | 1983/84 | 39 | 1974/75 | 1982/83 | 4 | – | – | – | |
| David Sincock | 1960/61 | 1965/66 | 35 | – | – | – | – | – | – | Brother of Peter Sincock and son of Harrold Sincock. |
| Harrold Sincock | 1929/30 | 1929/30 | 2 | – | – | - | – | – | – | Father of David and Peter Sincock. |
| Peter Sincock | 1974/75 | 1974/75 | 5 | – | – | - | – | – | – | Son of Harrold Sincock and brother of David Sincock. |
| Ken Skewes | – | – | – | 2005/06 | 2006/07 | 6 | 2005/06 | 2007/08 | 7 | |
| Peter Sleep | 1976/77 | 1992/93 | 146 | 1978/79 | 1992/93 | 33 | – | – | – | |
| Alexander Slight | 1886/87 | 1886/87 | 1 | – | – | - | – | – | – | Brother of Jim and William Slight. |
| William Slight | 1880/81 | 1881/82 | 3 | – | – | - | – | – | – | Brother of Alexander and Jim Slight. |
| Gladstone Small | 1985/86 | 1985/86 | 10 | 1985/86 | 1985/86 | 2 | – | – | – | |
| Haydn Smart | 1987/88 | 1987/88 | 1 | – | – | - | – | – | – | |
| Laurence Smart | 1950/51 | 1957/58 | 5 | – | – | - | – | – | – | |
| Andrew Smith | 1913/14 | 1921/22 | 12 | – | - | | – | – | – | |
| Jimmy Smith | 2008/09 | 2011/12 | 27 | 2006/07 | 2011/12 | 10 | 2006/07 | 2006/07 | 1 | Brother of Kelvin Smith. |
| Jack Smith | 2004/05 | 2004/05 | 4 | 2004/05 | 2004/05 | 4 | – | – | – | |
| Kelvin Smith | 2013/14 | 2014/15 | 8 | – | - | - | – | – | – | Brother of Jimmy Smith. |
| Lavington Smith | 1933/34 | 1933/34 | 1 | – | – | - | – | – | – | |
| Mike Smith | 1999/2000 | 2002/03 | 14 | 1999/2000 | 2002/03 | 16 | – | – | – | |
| Garry Sobers | 1961/62 | 1963/64 | 26 | – | – | – | – | – | – | |
| Sohail Tanvir | – | – | – | – | – | – | 2008/09 | 2008/09 | 4 | |
| Philip Squires | 1962/63 | 1962/63 | 1 | – | – | - | – | – | – | |
| Graham Stanford | 1968/69 | 1968/69 | 1 | – | – | - | – | – | – | |
| Ross Stanford | 1935/36 | 1947/48 | 10 | – | – | - | – | – | – | |
| Cec Starr | 1926/27 | 1945/46 | 7 | – | – | - | – | – | – | |
| Andrew Staunton | 2003/04 | 2003/04 | 1 | – | – | - | – | – | – | |
| Donald Steele | 1911/12 | 1920/21 | 19 | – | – | - | – | – | – | Brother of Kenneth Steele. |
| Kenneth Steele | 1913/14 | 1913/14 | 2 | – | – | - | – | – | – | Brother of Donald Steele. |
| Gavin Stevens | 1952/53 | 1958/59 | 38 | – | – | - | – | – | – | |
| Lachlan Stevens | – | – | – | 2002/03 | 2002/03 | 2 | – | – | – | |
| Les Stillman | 1977/78 | 1977/78 | 10 | 1977/78 | 1977/78 | 1 | – | – | – | Also played Australian rules football for Essendon and Footscray football clubs. |
| William Stirling | 1908/09 | 1920/21 | 14 | – | – | - | – | – | – | |
| Tom Stray | 2011/12 | 2011/12 | 5 | - | - | - | – | – | – | |
| David Strudwick | 1958/59 | 1958/59 | 1 | – | – | - | – | – | – | |
| William Stuart | 1899/1900 | 1908/09 | 8 | – | - | - | – | – | – | |
| Donald Sutherland | 1969/70 | 1971/72 | 11 | 1971/72 | 1971/72 | 2 | – | – | – | |
| Brett Swain | 1995/96 | 2000/01 | 22 | 1997/98 | 2001/02 | 19 | – | – | – | Grandson of Tim Wall. |
| Crawford Symonds | 1945/46 | 1945/46 | 4 | – | – | - | – | – | – | |
| Shaun Tait | 2002/03 | 2008/09 | 41 | 2002/03 | 2014/15 | 53 | 2005/06 | 2011/12 | 20 | |
| Joseph Tardif | 1889/90 | 1893/94 | 4 | – | – | - | – | – | – | |
| Reginald Teagle | 1930/31 | 1930/31 | 2 | – | – | - | – | – | – | |
| Francis Teisseire | 1939/40 | 1939/40 | 1 | – | - | - | – | – | – | |
| Carl Thamm | 1902/03 | 1902/03 | 1 | – | – | - | – | – | – | |
| Arthur Thomas | 1898/99 | 1898/99 | 1 | – | – | - | – | – | – | |
| Ramon Thomas | 1952/53 | 1952/53 | 6 | – | – | - | – | – | – | |
| Malcolm Thompson | 1935/36 | 1935/36 | 1 | – | – | - | – | – | – | |
| Tom Thornton | 2011/12 | 2011/12 | 2 | – | – | - | – | – | – | |
| Wilfred Thurgarland | 1920/21 | 1920/21 | 1 | – | – | - | – | – | – | Also played Australian rules football for Port Adelaide football club. |
| Carl Tietjens | 2011/12 | 2012/13 | 3 | – | – | - | – | – | – | |
| Bert Tobin | 1930/31 | 1934/35 | 26 | – | – | - | – | – | – | |
| Richard Townsend | 1907/08 | 1923/24 | 17 | – | – | - | – | – | – | Also played Australian rules football for Norwood. |
| Joe Travers | 1895/96 | 1906/07 | 36 | – | – | - | – | – | – | Also played Australian rules football for Norwood. |
| Jack Tregoning | 1939/40 | 1947/48 | 2 | – | – | - | – | – | – | |
| Peter Trethewey | 1957/58 | 1961/62 | 27 | – | – | - | – | – | – | |
| Dean Trowse | 1951/52 | 1955/56 | 22 | – | – | - | – | – | – | |
| Shannon Tubb | – | – | – | 2004/05 | 2004/05 | 3 | – | – | – | |
| Thomas Turner | 1885/86 | 1888/89 | 3 | – | – | - | – | – | – | |
| Jeff Vaughan | 1996/97 | 2002/03 | 28 | 1996/97 | 2002/03 | 24 | – | – | – | |
| Roland Vaughton | 1946/47 | 1947/48 | 6 | – | – | - | – | – | – | |
| Brian Vincent | 1980/81 | 1981/82 | 6 | 1979/80 | 1981/82 | 5 | – | – | – | Brother of Russell Vincent. |
| Russell Vincent | 1976/77 | 1976/77 | 3 | – | – | – | – | – | – | Brother of Brian Vincent. |
| Edmund Wainwright | 1923/24 | 1925/26 | 9 | – | – | - | – | – | – | |
| Mervyn Waite | 1930/31 | 1945/46 | 72 | – | – | - | – | – | – | Also played football for Glenelg and West Torrens football clubs. |
| Alfred Waldron | 1881/82 | 1887/88 | 2 | – | – | - | – | – | – | Also played Australian rules football for Carlton and Norwood football clubs. |
| Charlie Walker | 1928/29 | 1940/41 | 78 | – | – | – | – | – | – | Cousin of Ron Hamence. |
| Edwin Walkley | 1900/01 | 1901/02 | 4 | – | – | - | – | – | – | |
| Tim Wall | 1924/25 | 1935/36 | 53 | – | – | – | – | – | – | Son-in-law of Huntley Kekwick and grandfather of Brett Swain. |
| Laurence Walsh | 1930/31 | 1930/31 | 2 | – | – | - | – | – | – | Twin brother of Norman Walsh. |
| Norman Walsh | 1923/24 | 1925/26 | 9 | – | – | - | – | – | – | Twin brother of Laurence Walsh. |
| Frank Ward | 1935/36 | 1940/41 | 38 | – | – | – | – | – | – | |
| Robert Waters | 1901/02 | 1902/03 | 4 | – | – | - | – | – | – | |
| Walter Watling | 1883/84 | 1888/89 | 5 | – | – | - | – | – | – | |
| Goulburn Watsford | 1882/83 | 1882/83 | 1 | – | – | - | – | – | – | |
| Andrew Watson | 1985/86 | 1986/87 | 10 | – | – | - | – | – | – | |
| Colin Watts | 1947/48 | 1953/54 | 9 | – | – | - | – | – | – | |
| Dean Waugh | – | – | – | 1998/99 | 1998/99 | 2 | – | – | – | Brother of Mark and Steve Waugh. |
| Libby Waye | 1912/13 | 1912/13 | 1 | - | - | - | – | – | – | Also played Australian rules football for South Adelaide and West Torrens football clubs. |
| Matt Weaver | - | - | - | 2013/14 | 2013/14 | 3 | – | – | – | |
| Colin Webb | 1945/46 | 1945/46 | 6 | – | – | - | – | – | – | Brother of Kenneth Webb. |
| Kenneth Webb | 1946/47 | 1946/47 | 2 | – | – | - | – | – | – | Brother of Colin Webb. |
| Darren Webber | 1992/93 | 1997/98 | 44 | 1992/93 | 1997/98 | 27 | – | – | – | |
| Harold Webster | 1910/11 | 1911/12 | 6 | – | – | - | – | – | – | |
| Len Weekley | 1950/51 | 1955/56 | 6 | – | – | - | – | – | – | |
| Albert Weeks | 1887/88 | 1887/88 | 1 | – | – | - | – | – | – | |
| Matthew Weeks | 2005/06 | 2008/09 | 2 | 2004/05 | 2009/10 | 6 | 2008/09 | 2008/09 | 2 | |
| Alex Weir | 1949/50 | 1949/50 | 1 | – | – | - | – | – | – | |
| Henry Whitfield | 1926/27 | 1931/32 | 24 | – | – | - | – | – | – | |
| Richard Whitington | 1932/33 | 1939/40 | 36 | – | – | - | – | – | – | |
| Bill Whitty | 1908/09 | 1925/26 | 43 | – | – | - | – | – | – | |
| Robert Wigley | 1888/89 | 1889/90 | 3 | – | – | - | – | – | – | |
| Brad Wigney | 1992/93 | 1998/99 | 24 | 1992/93 | 1999/2000 | 27 | – | – | – | Brother of Stuart Wigney. |
| John Wilkin | 1949/50 | 1949/50 | 1 | – | – | - | – | – | – | |
| Alfred Wilkinson | 1885/86 | 1891/92 | 4 | – | – | - | – | – | – | |
| Brett Williams | 1988/89 | 1989/90 | 4 | 1988/89 | 1990/91 | 4 | – | – | – | |
| Cameron Williams | 2011/12 | 2011/12 | 1 | – | – | - | – | – | – | |
| Luke Williams | 2000/01 | 2004/05 | 5 | – | – | - | – | – | – | |
| Norman Williams | 1919/20 | 1928/29 | 33 | – | – | - | – | – | – | |
| Graham Williams | 1932/33 | 1937/38 | 18 | – | – | - | – | – | – | |
| Cameron Williamson | 1990/91 | 1991/92 | 2 | – | – | - | – | – | – | |
| Hurtle Willsmore | 1913/14 | 1920/21 | 9 | – | – | - | – | – | – | |
| Jack Wilson | 1950/51 | 1957/58 | 55 | – | – | - | – | – | – | |
| Paul Wilson | 1995/96 | 2001/02 | 36 | 1993/94 | 2001/02 | 48 | – | – | – | |
| Stan Wilson | 1975/76 | 1975/76 | 1 | – | – | - | – | – | – | |
| Legh Winser | 1913/14 | 1920/21 | 5 | – | – | - | – | – | – | |
| Graham Winter | 1981/82 | 1983/84 | 14 | 1978/79 | 1983/84 | 5 | – | – | – | |
| Nicholas Winter | 2017/18 | 2021/22 | 22 | 2014/15 | 2021/22 | 8 | – | – | – | |
| Allan Wise | 2008/09 | 2008/09 | 5 | 2008/09 | 2008/09 | 5 | – | – | – | |
| Hartley Wood | 1959/60 | 1959/60 | 2 | – | – | - | – | – | – | |
| Ashley Woodcock | 1967/68 | 1978/79 | 80 | 1969/70 | 1976/77 | 14 | – | – | – | |
| John Woodford | 1908/09 | 1908/09 | 7 | – | – | - | – | – | – | |
| Arthur Woolcock | 1909/10 | 1909/10 | 3 | – | – | - | – | – | – | |
| Daniel Worrall | 2012/13 | 2014/15 | 10 | 2012/13 | 2012/13 | 3 | – | – | – | |
| Albert Wright | 1905/06 | 1920/21 | 29 | - | – | - | – | – | – | |
| Gary Wright | 1992/93 | 1992/93 | 1 | – | – | - | – | – | – | |
| Kevin Wright | 1980/81 | 1983/84 | 40 | 1980/81 | 1983/84 | 10 | – | – | – | |
| Robert Wright | 1933/34 | 1933/34 | 2 | – | – | - | – | – | – | |
| Steve Wundke | 1985/86 | 1986/87 | 6 | 1983/84 | 1986/87 | 15 | – | – | – | |
| Dennis Yagmich | 1974/75 | 1976/77 | 20 | 1975/76 | 1975/76 | 2 | – | – | – | |
| Bradley Young | 1996/97 | 2002/03 | 51 | 1996/97 | 2002/03 | 44 | – | – | – | |
| Younis Ahmed | 1972/73 | 1972/73 | 6 | 1972/73 | 1972/73 | 1 | – | – | – | |
| Younis Khan | 2008/09 | 2008/09 | 4 | 2008/09 | 2008/09 | 5 | – | – | – | |
| Robert Zadow | 1979/80 | 1986/87 | 32 | 1980/81 | 1985/1986 | 3 | – | – | – | |
| Adam Zampa | 2013/14 | 2014/15 | 14 | 2013/14 | 2014/15 | 10 | – | – | – | |
| Andrew Zesers | 1984/85 | 1989/90 | 45 | 1984/85 | 1988/89 | 13 | – | – | - | Youngest Australian player to take 100 first-class wickets. |
| Paul Zschorn | 1910/11 | 1910/11 | 2 | – | – | – | – | - | – | – |
