= Brian Vincent =

Brian Vincent may refer to:

- Brian Vincent (cricketer)
- Brian Vincent (director)
