= Noel Fielke =

Australian cricketer (born 1966)

Personal information
- Full name: Noel Fielke
- Born: 23 December 1966 (age 59); Adelaide, South Australia
- Batting: Left-handed
- Role: Batsman

Domestic team information
- Years: Team
- 1992-93: South Australia

Career statistics
Competition	First-class	List A
Matches	5	3
Runs scored	315	69
Batting average	31.50	23.00
100s/50s	–/3	–/–
Top score	74	38
Balls bowled	–	–
Wickets	–	–
Bowling average	–	–
5 wickets in innings	–	–
10 wickets in match	–	–
Best bowling	–	–
Catches/stumpings	5/–	–/–
- Source: Cricinfo, 11 December 2018

Noel Fielke (born 23 December 1966) is an Australian cricketer. He played five first-class matches and three List A matches for South Australia in 1992/93.

== See also ==
- List of South Australian representative cricketers
