= Huntley Kekwick =

Australian cricketer

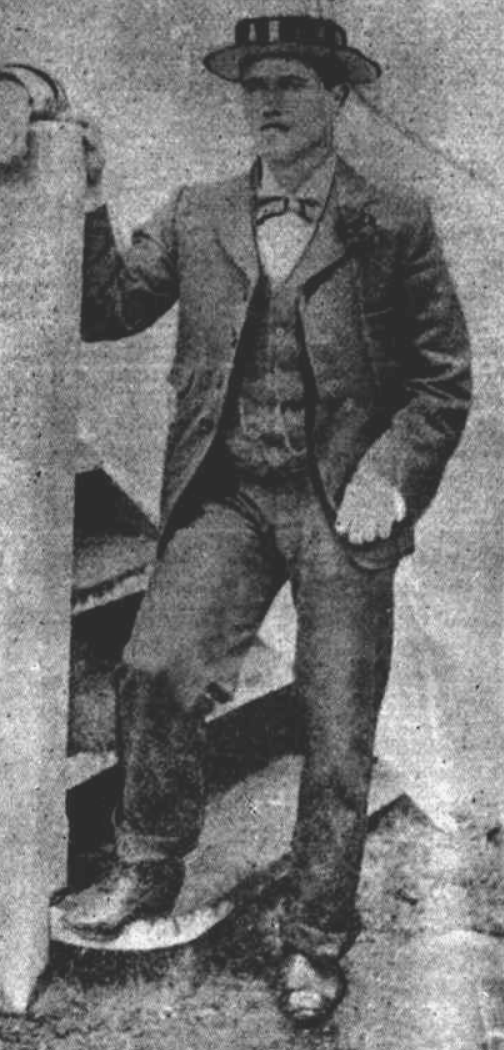

Personal information
- Born: 5 March 1875; Port MacDonnell, South Australia
- Died: 29 August 1950 (aged 75); Adelaide, South Australia
- Source: Cricinfo, 9 August 2020

Huntley Kekwick (5 March 1875 – 29 August 1950) was an Australian cricketer. He played in two first-class matches for South Australia in 1899/1900.

== See also ==
- List of South Australian representative cricketers
