= Henry Whitfield (cricketer) =

Australian cricketer

Personal information
- Born: 25 February 1903; Adelaide, Australia
- Died: 14 January 1937 (aged 33)
- Source: Cricinfo, 30 September 2020

Henry Whitfield (25 February 1903 – 14 January 1937) was an Australian cricketer. He played in twenty-five first-class matches for South Australia between 1926 and 1932.

== See also ==
- List of South Australian representative cricketers
