= Brian Pittman (cricketer) =

Australian cricketer

Personal information
- Born: 17 June 1930 (age 96); Adelaide, Australia
- Source: Cricinfo, 18 September 2020

Brian Pittman (born 17 June 1930) is an Australian cricketer. He played in one first-class match for South Australia in 1959/60.

== See also ==
- List of South Australian representative cricketers
