= Robert Shepherdson =

Australian cricketer

Personal information
- Born: 4 September 1913; Mount Gambier, South Australia
- Died: 19 August 1992 (aged 78)
- Source: Cricinfo, 25 September 2020

Robert Shepherdson (4 September 1913 – 19 August 1992) was an Australian cricketer. He played in one first-class match for South Australia in 1935/36.

== See also ==
- List of South Australian representative cricketers
