= Brian Mitchell (cricketer) =

Australian cricketer (born 1959)

Personal information
- Born: 15 March 1959 (age 67); Adelaide, Australia
- Source: Cricinfo, 23 August 2020

Brian Mitchell (born 15 March 1959) is an Australian cricketer. He played in four first-class matches for South Australia in 1978/79.

== See also ==
- List of South Australian representative cricketers
