= David Ritossa =

Australian cricketer (born 1971)

Personal information
- Born: 22 January 1971 (age 55); Adelaide, Australia
- Source: Cricinfo, 25 September 2020

David Ritossa (born 22 January 1971) is an Australian cricketer. He played in one first-class and one List A match for South Australia in 1992/93.

== See also ==
- List of South Australian representative cricketers
