= Christopher Sangster =

Australian cricketer

Personal information
- Born: 1 May 1908; Adelaide, Australia
- Died: 27 February 1995 (aged 86)
- Source: Cricinfo, 25 September 2020

Christopher Sangster (1 May 1908 – 27 February 1995) was an Australian cricketer. He played in two first-class matches for South Australia in 1927/28.

== See also ==
- List of South Australian representative cricketers
