= Matthew Kelton =

Australian cricketer (born 1974)

Personal information
- Born: 9 April 1974 (age 52); Adelaide, Australia
- Source: Cricinfo, 9 August 2020

Matthew Kelton (born 9 April 1974) is an Australian cricketer. He played in two first-class matches for South Australia in 1997/98.

== See also ==
- List of South Australian representative cricketers
