= Roland Vaughton =

Australian cricketer

Personal information
- Born: 5 May 1914; Adelaide, Australia
- Died: 5 January 1979 (aged 64)
- Source: Cricinfo, 29 September 2020

Roland Vaughton (5 May 1914 – 5 January 1979) was an Australian cricketer. He played in six first-class matches for South Australia between 1946 and 1948.

== See also ==
- List of South Australian representative cricketers
