= Percy Coombe =

Australian cricketer

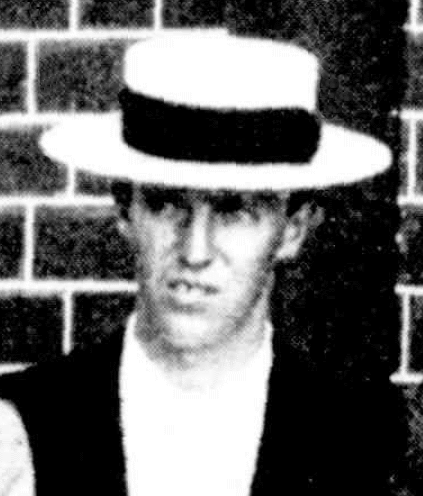

Personal information
- Born: 7 January 1880; Adelaide, Australia
- Died: 28 July 1947 (aged 67); Prospect, South Australia
- Source: Cricinfo, 4 June 2018

Percy Coombe (7 January 1880 – 28 July 1947) was an Australian cricketer. He played eight first-class matches for South Australia between 1903 and 1915.

== See also ==
- List of South Australian representative cricketers
