= Ross McLellan =

Australian cricketer (born 1955)

Personal information
- Born: 20 February 1955 (age 71); Glen Huntly, Victoria, Australia
- Source: Cricinfo, 19 August 2020

Ross McLellan (born 20 February 1955) is an Australian cricketer. He played in three first-class matches for South Australia between 1979 and 1982.

== See also ==
- List of South Australian representative cricketers
