= Ernest Pynor =

Australian cricketer

Personal information
- Born: 23 April 1920; Essendon, Victoria, Australia
- Died: 23 October 1999 (aged 79); Melbourne, Victoria
- Source: Cricinfo, 21 September 2020

Ernest Pynor (23 April 1920 – 23 October 1999) was an Australian cricketer. He played in three first-class matches for South Australia between 1948 and 1950.

== See also ==
- List of South Australian representative cricketers
