= Edward Phillips (cricketer, born 1851) =

Australian cricketer

Personal information
- Born: 1 March 1851; Adelaide, Australia
- Died: 8 February 1933 (aged 81)
- Source: Cricinfo, 18 September 2020

Edward Phillips (1 March 1851 – 8 February 1933) was an Australian cricketer. He played in six first-class matches for South Australia between 1877 and 1890.

== See also ==
- List of South Australian representative cricketers
