= Robert Christensen =

Australian cricketer (1982–1984)

Personal information
- Born: 31 October 1959 (age 67); Adelaide, Australia
- Source: Cricinfo, 25 May 2018

Robert Christensen (born 31 October 1959) is an Australian cricketer. He played four first-class matches for South Australia between 1982 and 1984.

== See also ==
- List of South Australian representative cricketers
