= George Liston =

Australian cricketer

Personal information
- Born: 29 April 1860; Tanunda, South Australia
- Died: 6 June 1929 (aged 69); Kent Town, Australia
- Source: Cricinfo, 12 August 2020

George Liston (29 April 1860 – 6 June 1929) was an Australian cricketer. He played in one first-class match for South Australia in 1887/88.

== See also ==
- List of South Australian representative cricketers
