= Matt Weaver =

Australian cricketer (born 1985)

Personal information
- Born: 28 May 1985 (age 41); Adelaide, Australia
- Source: Cricinfo, 29 September 2020

Matt Weaver (born 28 May 1985) is an Australian cricketer. He played in three List A matches for South Australia in 2013.

== See also ==
- List of South Australian representative cricketers
