= Richard Evans (Australian cricketer) =

Australian cricketer

Personal information
- Born: 9 September 1867; Adelaide, Australia
- Died: 1 November 1939 (aged 72); Adelaide, Australia
- Source: Cricinfo, 27 November 2018

Richard Evans (9 September 1867 – 1 November 1939) was an Australian cricketer. He played one first-class match for South Australia in 1892/93.

== See also ==
- List of South Australian representative cricketers
