= William Moffat (cricketer) =

Australian cricketer

Personal information
- Born: 22 July 1858; Byethorne, South Australia
- Died: 30 July 1932 (aged 74); Jamestown, South Australia
- Source: Cricinfo, 23 August 2020

William Moffat (22 July 1858 – 30 July 1932) was an Australian cricketer. He played in one first-class match for South Australia in 1877/78.

== See also ==
- List of South Australian representative cricketers
