= Laurence Evan =

Australian cricketer

Personal information
- Born: 27 October 1864; Adelaide, Australia
- Died: 12 August 1894 (aged 29); Adelaide, Australia
- Source: Cricinfo, 27 November 2018

Laurence Evan (27 October 1864 – 12 August 1894) was an Australian cricketer. He played two first-class matches for South Australia between 1885 and 1891.

== See also ==
- List of South Australian representative cricketers
