= Darren Webber (cricketer) =

Australian cricketer (born 1971)

Personal information
- Born: 18 August 1971 (age 55); Adelaide, Australia
- Source: Cricinfo, 29 September 2020

Darren Webber (born 18 August 1971) is an Australian cricketer. He played in 44 first-class and 27 List A matches for South Australia between 1992 and 1998.

== See also ==
- List of South Australian representative cricketers
