= Norman King (cricketer) =

Australian cricketer

Personal information
- Born: 9 April 1915; Adelaide, Australia
- Died: 25 May 1973 (aged 58); Linden Park, Australia
- Source: Cricinfo, 12 August 2020

Norman King (9 April 1915 – 25 May 1973) was an Australian cricketer. He played in five first-class matches for South Australia between 1949 and 1951.

== See also ==
- List of South Australian representative cricketers
