= Darryl Scott (cricketer) =

Australian cricketer (born 1961)

Personal information
- Born: 9 March 1961 (age 65); Adelaide, Australia
- Source: Cricinfo, 25 September 2020

Darryl Scott (born 9 March 1961) is an Australian cricketer. He played in four first-class and nine List A matches for South Australia between 1983 and 1990.

== See also ==
- List of South Australian representative cricketers
