= Stanley Leak =

Australian cricketer

Personal information
- Born: 21 March 1886; Goodwood, South Australia
- Died: 10 January 1963 (aged 76); Millswood, Australia
- Source: Cricinfo, 12 August 2020

Stanley Leak (21 March 1886 – 10 January 1963) was an Australian cricketer. He played in one first-class match for South Australia in 1912/13.

== See also ==
- List of South Australian representative cricketers
