= Donnell Downey =

Australian cricketer

Personal information
- Born: 12 April 1907; Adelaide, Australia
- Died: 23 January 1966 (aged 58); Adelaide, Australia
- Source: Cricinfo, 31 October 2018

Donnell Downey (12 April 1907 – 23 January 1966) was an Australian cricketer. He played one first-class match for South Australia in 1925/26.

== See also ==
- List of South Australian representative cricketers
