= Thomas Lucas (cricketer) =

Australian cricketer

Personal information
- Born: 18 February 1852; Adelaide, Australia
- Died: 13 March 1945 (aged 93); Adelaide, Australia
- Source: Cricinfo, 12 August 2020

Thomas Lucas (18 February 1852 – 13 March 1945) was an Australian cricketer. He played in one first-class match for South Australia in 1877/78.

== See also ==
- List of South Australian representative cricketers
