= Peter Hill (cricketer) =

Australian cricketer

Personal information
- Born: 28 January 1923; Adelaide, Australia
- Died: 3 October 2002 (aged 79); Adelaide, South Australia
- Source: Cricinfo, 6 August 2020

Peter Hill (28 January 1923 – 3 October 2002) was an Australian cricketer. He played in one first-class match for South Australia in 1949/50.

== See also ==
- List of South Australian representative cricketers
