= John Musgrove (cricketer) =

Australian cricketer (1861–1940)

Personal information
- Born: 28 July 1861; Adelaide, Australia
- Died: 9 June 1940 (aged 78); Adelaide, Australia
- Source: Cricinfo, 23 August 2020

John Musgrove (28 July 1861 – 9 June 1940) was an Australian cricketer. He played in three first-class matches for South Australia in 1887/88.

== See also ==
- List of South Australian representative cricketers
