= Graham Levy =

Australian cricketer (born 1938)

Personal information
- Born: 10 February 1938 (age 88); Adelaide, Australia
- Source: Cricinfo, 12 August 2020

Graham Levy (born 10 February 1938) is an Australian cricketer. He played in one first-class match for South Australia in 1961/62.

== See also ==
- List of South Australian representative cricketers
