= Charles Moyle =

Australian cricketer

Personal information
- Born: 16 April 1884; Adelaide, Australia
- Died: 2 August 1952 (aged 68); Adelaide, Australia
- Source: Cricinfo, 23 August 2020

Charles Moyle (16 April 1884 – 2 August 1952) was an Australian cricketer. He played in two first-class matches for South Australia in 1910/11.

== See also ==
- List of South Australian representative cricketers
