= Gary Wright (cricketer) =

Australian cricketer (born 1970)

Personal information
- Born: 9 November 1970 (age 56); Adelaide, Australia
- Source: Cricinfo, 30 September 2020

Gary Wright (born 9 November 1970) is an Australian cricketer. He played in one first-class match for South Australia in 1992/93.

== See also ==
- List of South Australian representative cricketers
