= Hartley Wood =

Australian cricketer

Personal information
- Born: 5 April 1930; Adelaide, Australia
- Died: 16 December 1988 (aged 58)
- Source: Cricinfo, 30 September 2020

Hartley Wood (5 April 1930 – 16 December 1988) was an Australian cricketer. He played in two first-class matches for South Australia in 1959/60.

== See also ==
- List of South Australian representative cricketers
