= Harry Haldane =

Australian cricketer

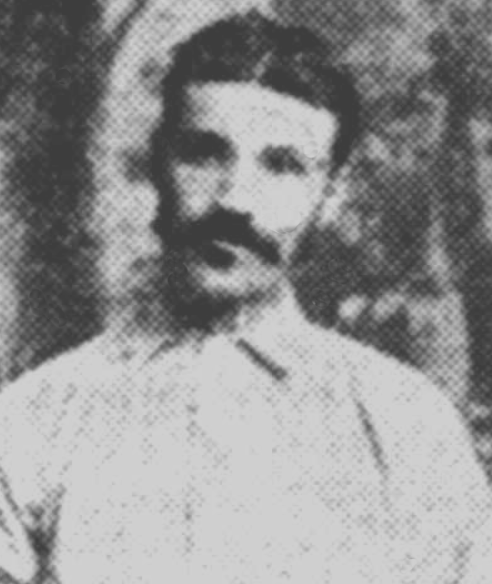

Personal information
- Born: 13 July 1865; Adelaide, Australia
- Died: 12 August 1951 (aged 86); Ararat, Victoria
- Source: Cricinfo, 6 August 2020

Harry Haldane (13 July 1865 – 12 August 1951) was an Australian cricketer. He played in eleven first-class matches for South Australia between 1886 and 1894.

== See also ==
- List of South Australian representative cricketers
