= Arthur Peters (Australian cricketer) =

Australian cricketer

Personal information
- Born: 8 March 1872; Adelaide, Australia
- Died: 24 September 1903 (aged 31)
- Source: Cricinfo, 18 September 2020

Arthur Peters (8 March 1872 – 24 September 1903) was an Australian cricketer. He played in three first-class matches for South Australia in 1898/99.

== See also ==
- List of South Australian representative cricketers
