= Carl Tietjens =

Australian cricketer (born 1986)

Personal information
- Born: 25 March 1986 (age 40); Adelaide, Australia
- Source: Cricinfo, 28 September 2020

Carl Tietjens (born 25 March 1986) is an Australian cricketer. He played in three first-class matches for South Australia between 2011 and 2013.

== See also ==
- List of South Australian representative cricketers
