= Joshua Rundell =

Australian cricketer

Personal information
- Born: 6 May 1861; Sandhurst, Victoria, Australia
- Died: 7 January 1922 (aged 60)
- Source: Cricinfo, 25 September 2020

Joshua Rundell (6 May 1861 – 7 January 1922) was an Australian cricketer. He played in two first-class matches for South Australia between 1883 and 1885.

== See also ==
- List of South Australian representative cricketers
