= Norman Riley (cricketer) =

Australian cricketer

Personal information
- Born: 9 April 1894; Adelaide, Australia
- Died: 2 October 1960 (aged 66)
- Source: Cricinfo, 25 September 2020

Norman Riley (9 April 1894 – 2 October 1960) was an Australian cricketer. He played in one first-class match for South Australia in 1925/26.

== See also ==
- List of South Australian representative cricketers
