= Cec Starr =

Australian cricketer

Personal information
- Full name: Cecil Leonard Berry Starr
- Born: 20 July 1907; Quorn, South Australia
- Died: 25 January 2005 (aged 97)
- Source: Cricinfo, 25 September 2020

Cec Starr (20 July 1907 – 25 January 2005) was an Australian cricketer. He played in seven first-class matches for South Australia between 1926 and 1946.

== See also ==
- List of South Australian representative cricketers
