= John Quilty (cricketer) =

Australian cricketer

Personal information
- Born: 1860; Adelaide, Colony of South Australia
- Died: 9 May 1942 (aged 81–82)
- Source: Cricinfo, 21 September 2020

John Quilty (1860 – 9 May 1942) was an Australian cricketer. He played in two first-class matches for South Australia between 1881 and 1883.

== See also ==
- List of South Australian representative cricketers
