= Paul Galloway (cricketer) =

Australian cricketer

Personal information
- Born: 14 September 1943; Sydney, New South Wales, Australia
- Died: 20 August 1996 (aged 52); Loxton, South Australia
- Source: Cricinfo, 18 February 2020

Paul Galloway (14 September 1943 – 20 August 1996) was an Australian cricketer. He played eleven first-class matches for South Australia between 1968 and 1970.

== See also ==
- List of South Australian representative cricketers
