= Mark Eaton (cricketer) =

Australian cricketer (born 1953)

Personal information
- Born: 11 June 1953 (age 73); Adelaide, Australia
- Source: Cricinfo, 31 October 2018

Mark Eaton (born 11 June 1953) is an Australian cricketer. He played three first-class matches for South Australia in 1976/77.

== See also ==
- List of South Australian representative cricketers
