= William Jones (South Australia cricketer) =

Australian cricketer

Personal information
- Born: 13 May 1864; Adelaide, Australia
- Died: 16 July 1924 (aged 60); Adelaide, Australia
- Source: Cricinfo, 9 August 2020

William Jones (13 May 1864 – 16 July 1924) was an Australian cricketer. He played in two first-class matches for South Australia between 1881 and 1884.

== See also ==
- List of South Australian representative cricketers
