= Robert Fraser (cricketer) =

Australian cricketer (born 1954)

Personal information
- Born: 13 February 1954 (age 72); Adelaide, South Australia
- Source: Cricinfo, 16 January 2019

Robert Fraser (born 13 February 1954) is an Australian cricketer. He played seven first-class matches for South Australia between 1974 and 1979.

== See also ==
- List of South Australian representative cricketers
