= Fred Gould (cricketer) =

Australian cricketer

Personal information
- Born: 18 September 1891; Adelaide, Australia
- Died: 15 February 1954 (aged 62); Kingswood, South Australia
- Source: Cricinfo, 6 August 2020

Fred Gould (18 September 1891 – 15 February 1954) was an Australian cricketer. He played in seven first-class matches for South Australia between 1922 and 1925.

== See also ==
- List of South Australian representative cricketers
