= Charles Martin (South Australia cricketer) =

Australian cricketer

Personal information
- Born: 29 March 1863; Adelaide, Australia
- Died: 14 May 1954 (aged 91); Adelaide, Australia
- Source: Cricinfo, 19 August 2020

Charles Martin (29 March 1863 – 14 May 1954) was an Australian cricketer. He played in three first-class matches for South Australia in 1895/96, and he represented the Middlesex club in the Adelaide Metropolitan cricket competition playing in their Premiership teams of 1889, 1890, and 1891 as Vice-captain. He also represented South Australia in football and in his career he worked for the South Australian Gas Company for fifty-three years.

== See also ==
- List of South Australian representative cricketers
