= Robert Wright (Australian cricketer) =

Australian cricketer

Personal information
- Born: 11 November 1914; Adelaide, Australia
- Died: 20 January 1965 (aged 50)
- Source: Cricinfo, 30 September 2020

Robert Wright (11 November 1914 – 20 January 1965) was an Australian cricketer. He played in two first-class matches for South Australia in 1933/34.

== See also ==
- List of South Australian representative cricketers
