= Neil Shepley =

Australian cricketer

Personal information
- Born: 7 October 1899; Adelaide, Australia
- Died: 14 November 1953 (aged 54)
- Source: Cricinfo, 25 September 2020

Neil Shepley (7 October 1899 – 14 November 1953) was an Australian cricketer. He played in one first-class match for South Australia in 1925/26.

== See also ==
- List of South Australian representative cricketers
