= James Munting =

Australian cricketer (born 1986)

Personal information
- Born: 28 September 1986 (age 40); Adelaide, Australia
- Source: Cricinfo, 23 August 2020

James Munting (born 28 September 1986) is an Australian cricketer. He played in one first-class match for South Australia in 2013.

== See also ==
- List of South Australian representative cricketers
