= Arthur Pellew =

Australian cricketer

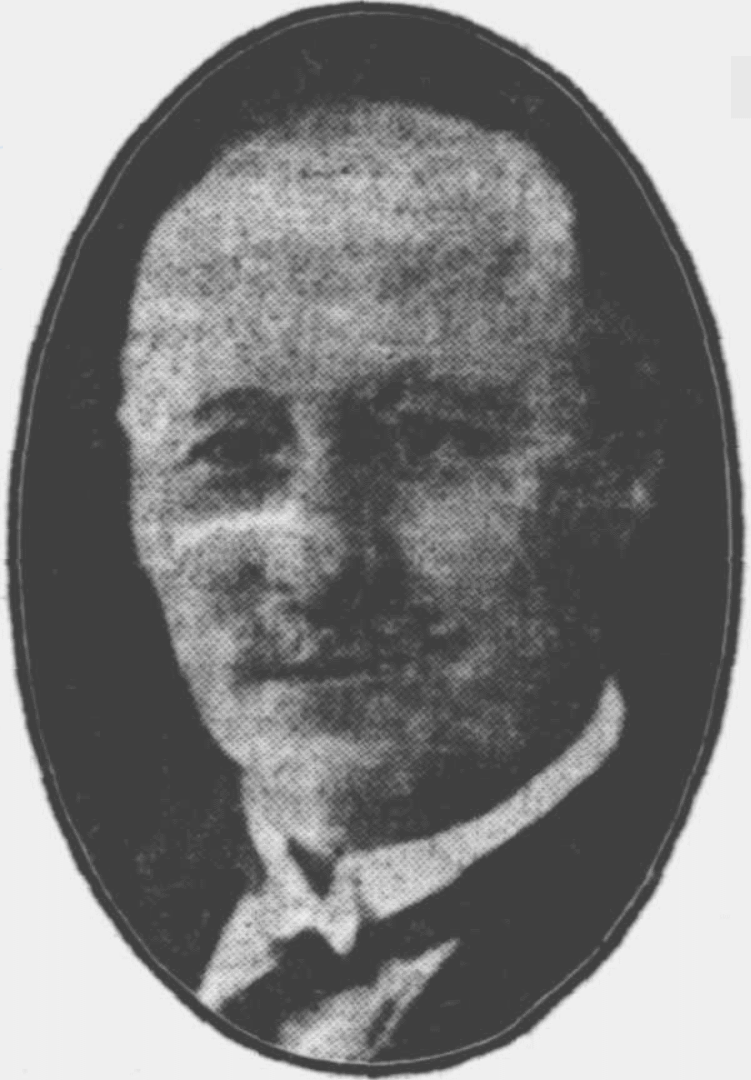

Personal information
- Born: 20 January 1878; Adelaide, Australia
- Died: 21 August 1948 (aged 70)
- Source: Cricinfo, 18 September 2020

Arthur Pellew (20 January 1878 – 21 August 1948) was an Australian cricketer. He played in two first-class matches for South Australia in 1900/01. He also played for North Kapunda Cricket Club.

== See also ==
- List of South Australian representative cricketers
