= John Donaldson (Australian cricketer) =

Australian cricketer

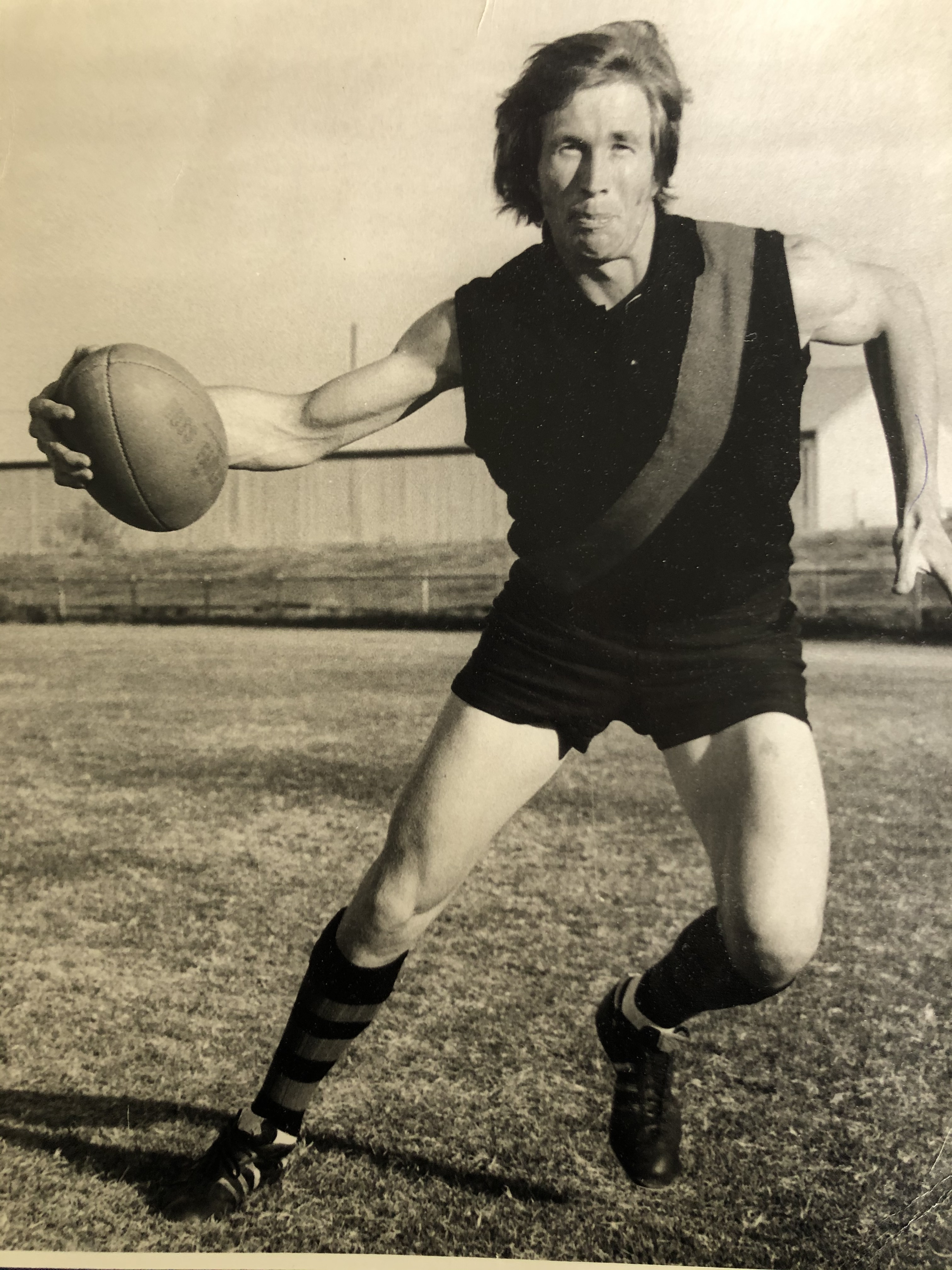

Personal information
- Born: 14 April 1950 (age 76); Adelaide, Australia
- Source: Cricinfo, 24 July 2018

John Donaldson (born 14 April 1950) is an Australian cricketer. He played seven first-class matches for South Australia between 1972 and 1974.

Born to Peter and Enid, John was raised in Richmond with his younger brothers Graeme and Robert. All three brothers would later play for West Adelaide Football Club.

While studying to become a Physical Education teacher, Donaldson played for Student Teachers in the South Australian Amateur Football League, winning the Hone Medal (the League's Best and Fairest) in 1972. He went on to play three games for West Adelaide Football Club the same year, before following John Halbert to Sturt Football Club. He retired from football in 1977 after an ankle injury. He continued as runner for Glenelg Football Club for two seasons.

During his studies, Donaldson also played cricket for Student Teachers District Cricket Club, where he held the district wicket keeping record for most dismissals in an innings (seven) for 33 years. John made his State debut for South Australia in 1972 in the final game of the season, selected as a batsman rather than wicket keeper. Donaldson played 12 games for South Australia, seven First Class and five One Day matches. He continued to play for Student Teachers District Cricket Club until 1978 then as a playing coach for West Torrens Cricket Club until 1984, winning the CW Walker Wicket Keeping Trophy (highest wicket taker) three times and runner up four times.

During his teaching career, Donaldson taught at Plympton High School, Para Hills High School, Keith Area School and Marryatville High School. He was awarded the Australian Sports Medal in 2000 for his contribution to sport in South Australia.

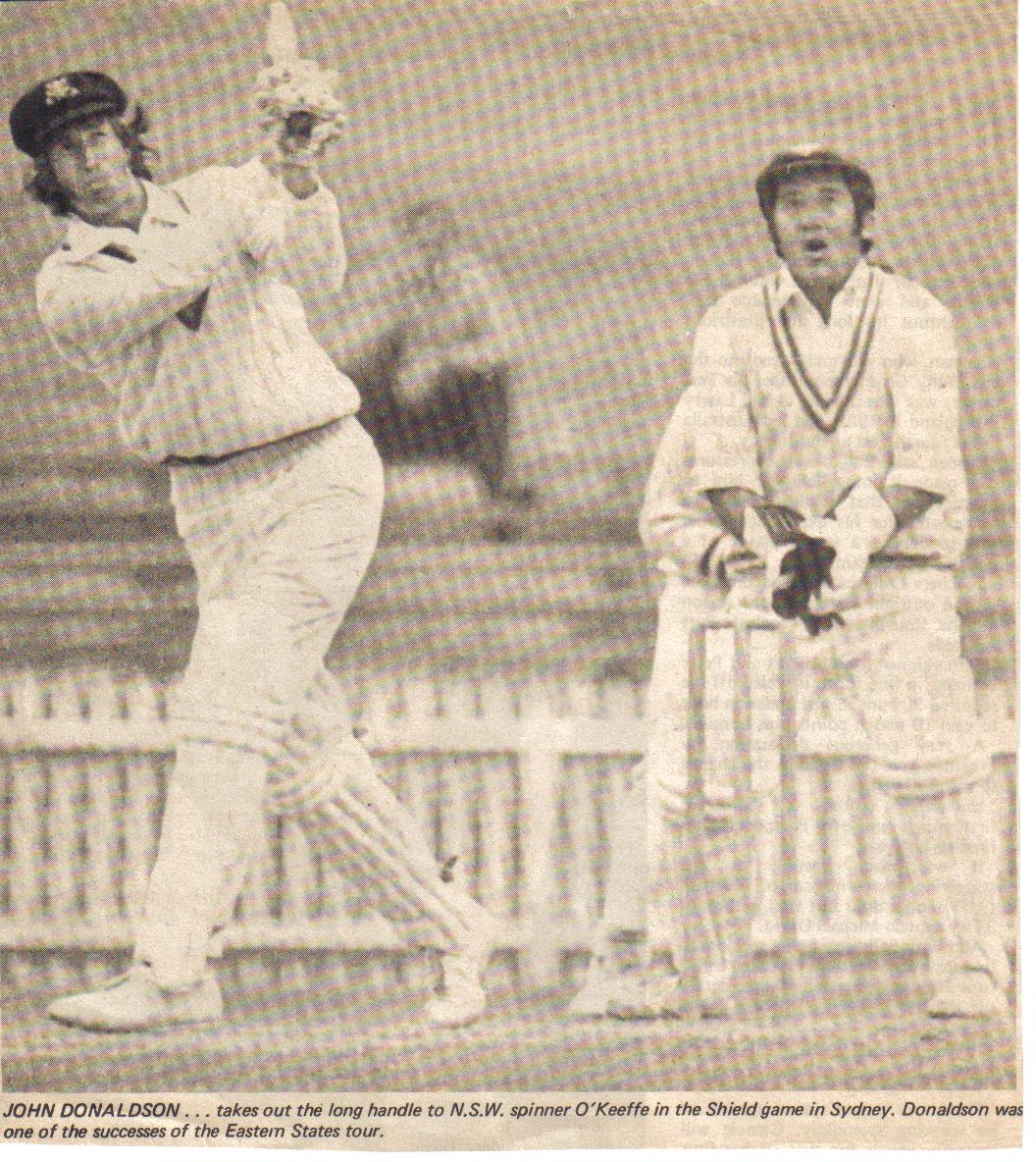
Donaldson playing cricket for South Australia in 1973

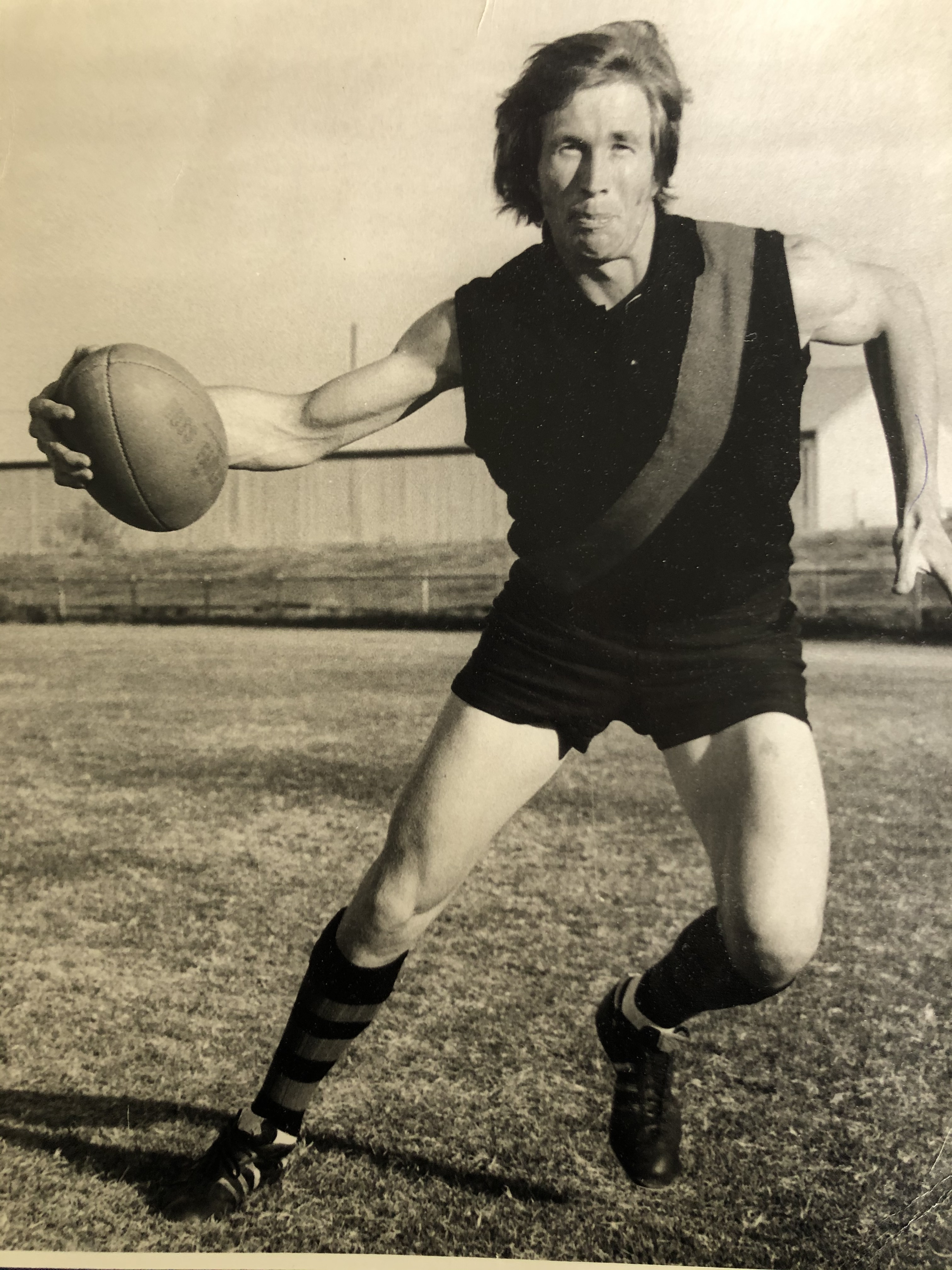
Donaldson at football training in the early 1970s

== See also ==
- List of South Australian representative cricketers
