= Malcolm Thompson (cricketer) =

Australian cricketer

Personal information
- Born: 29 October 1913; Adelaide, Australia
- Died: 19 March 1936 (aged 22)
- Source: Cricinfo, 28 September 2020

Malcolm Thompson (29 October 1913 – 19 March 1936) was an Australian cricketer. He played in one first-class match for South Australia in 1935/36.

== See also ==
- List of South Australian representative cricketers
