= Robert Wigley =

Australian cricketer

Personal information
- Born: 15 March 1864; Windsor, Victoria
- Died: 20 April 1926 (aged 62)
- Source: Cricinfo, 30 September 2020

Robert Wigley (15 March 1864 – 20 April 1926) was an Australian cricketer. He played in three first-class matches for South Australia between 1888 and 1890.

== See also ==
- List of South Australian representative cricketers
