= Trevor Pearson (cricketer) =

Australian cricketer (born 1943)

Personal information
- Born: 13 October 1943 (age 83); Adelaide, Australia
- Source: Cricinfo, 18 September 2020

Trevor Pearson (born 13 October 1943) is an Australian cricketer. He played in three first-class matches for South Australia in 1969/70.

== See also ==
- List of South Australian representative cricketers
