= John Craigie (cricketer) =

Australian cricketer

Personal information
- Born: 25 August 1866; Adelaide, Australia
- Died: 13 October 1948 (aged 82); Gilberton, South Australia
- Source: Cricinfo, 6 June 2018

John Craigie (25 August 1866 – 13 October 1948) was an Australian cricketer. He played two first-class matches for South Australia in 1887/88.

== See also ==
- List of South Australian representative cricketers
