= Arthur Woolcock =

Australian cricketer

Personal information
- Born: 10 June 1887; Adelaide, Australia
- Died: 29 June 1975 (aged 88)
- Source: Cricinfo, 30 September 2020

Arthur Woolcock (10 June 1887 – 29 June 1975) was an Australian cricketer. He played in three first-class matches for South Australia in 1909/10.

== See also ==
- List of South Australian representative cricketers
