= Eustace Loveridge =

Australian cricketer (1891–1959)

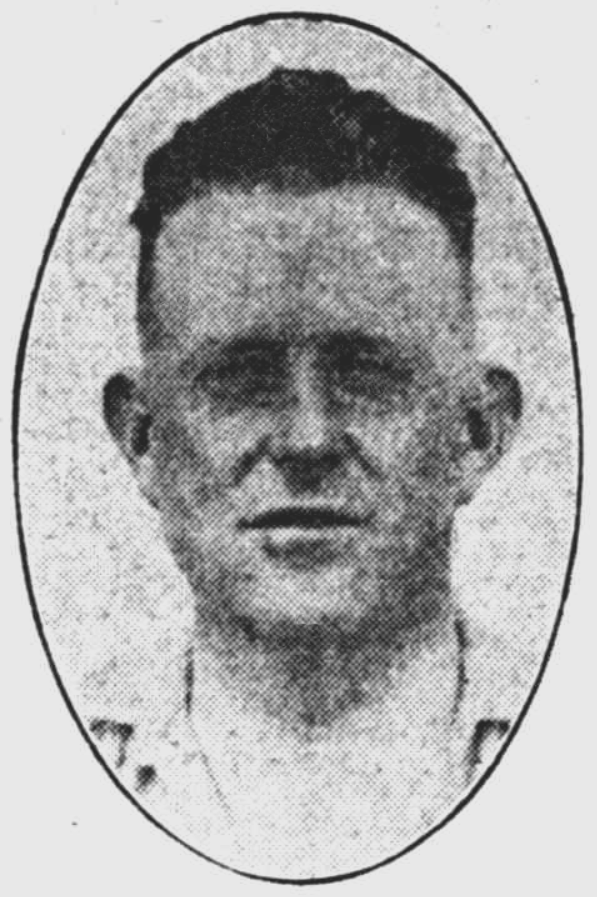

Personal information
- Born: 14 April 1891; Yongala, South Australia
- Died: 29 July 1959 (aged 68); Adelaide, Australia
- Source: Cricinfo, 12 August 2020

Eustace Loveridge (14 April 1891 – 29 July 1959) was an Australian cricketer. He played in five first-class matches for South Australia between 1920 and 1923.

== See also ==
- List of South Australian representative cricketers
