= Henry Chittleborough =

Australian cricketer (1861–1925)

Personal information
- Born: 14 April 1861; Wallaroo Mines, Australia
- Died: 25 June 1925 (aged 64); Malvern, Australia
- Source: Cricinfo, 25 May 2018

Henry Chittleborough (14 April 1861 – 25 June 1925) was an Australian cricketer. He played two first-class matches for South Australia between 1883 and 1885.

== See also ==
- List of South Australian representative cricketers
