= Donald Sutherland (cricketer) =

Australian cricketer (born 1949)

Personal information
- Born: 28 November 1949 (age 76); Adelaide, Australia
- Source: Cricinfo, 28 September 2020

Donald Sutherland (born 28 November 1949) is an Australian cricketer. He played in eleven first-class matches for South Australia between 1969 and 1972.

== See also ==
- List of South Australian representative cricketers
