= Matthew King (Australian cricketer) =

Australian cricketer (born 1977)

Personal information
- Born: 25 June 1977 (age 49); Port Pirie, Australia
- Source: Cricinfo, 12 August 2020

Matthew King (born 25 June 1977) is an Australian cricketer. He played in one List A match for South Australia in 2001/02.

== See also ==
- List of South Australian representative cricketers
