= Eugene Kitson =

Australian cricketer

Personal information
- Born: 28 November 1889; Adelaide, Australia
- Died: 4 August 1962 (aged 72); Melbourne, Australia
- Source: Cricinfo, 12 August 2020

Eugene Kitson (28 November 1889 – 4 August 1962) was an Australian cricketer. He played in one first-class match for South Australia in 1912/13.

== See also ==
- List of South Australian representative cricketers
