= Mike Smith (Australian cricketer) =

Australian cricketer (born 1973)

Personal information
- Born: 17 July 1973 (age 53); Adelaide, Australia
- Source: Cricinfo, 25 September 2020

Mike Smith (born 17 July 1973) is an Australian cricketer. He played in fourteen first-class and sixteen List A matches for South Australia between 1999 and 2003.

== See also ==
- List of South Australian representative cricketers
