= Leonard Michael =

Australian cricketer

Personal information
- Born: 3 June 1921; Medindie, Australia
- Died: 16 March 1996 (aged 74); Adelaide, Australia
- Source: Cricinfo, 19 August 2020

Leonard Michael (3 June 1921 – 16 March 1996) was an Australian cricketer. He played in twenty-one first-class matches for South Australia between 1939 and 1952.

== See also ==
- List of South Australian representative cricketers
