= Edward Carragher =

Australian cricketer (1891–1977)

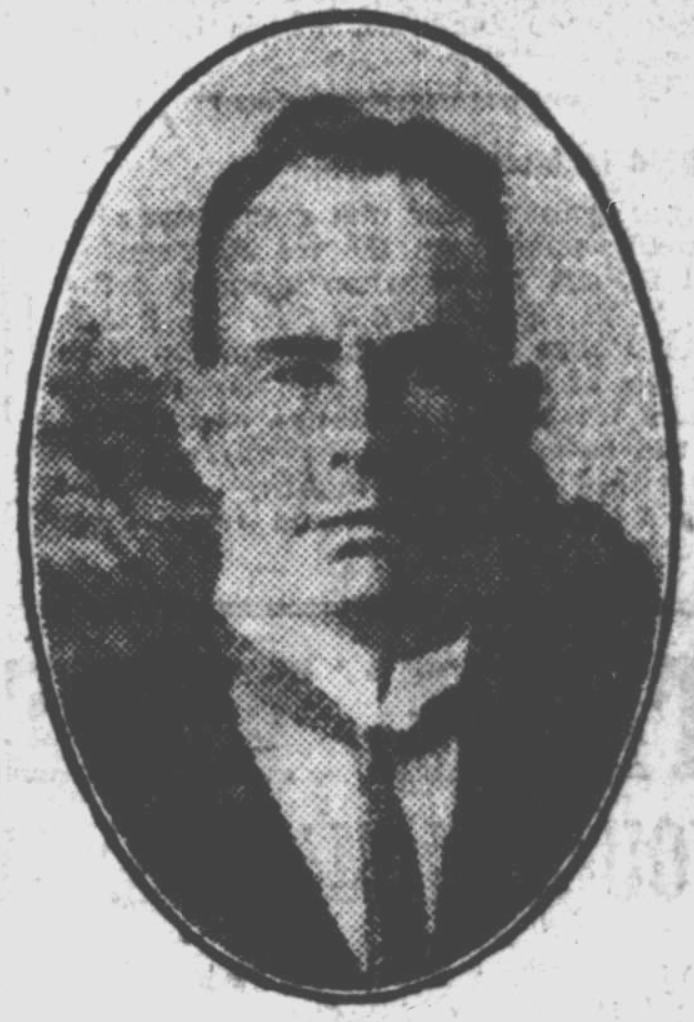

Personal information
- Born: 24 May 1891; Broken Hill, Australia
- Died: 28 November 1977 (aged 86); Broken Hill, Australia

Domestic team information
- Years: Team
- 1922/23: South Australia

Edward Carragher (24 May 1891 – 28 November 1977) was an Australian cricketer. He played two first-class matches for South Australia in 1922/23.

== See also ==
- List of South Australian representative cricketers
