= Matthew Weeks =

Australian cricketer (born 1982)

Personal information
- Born: 4 October 1982 (age 44); Adelaide, Australia
- Source: Cricinfo, 30 September 2020

Matthew Weeks (born 4 October 1982) is an Australian cricketer. He played in two first-class and six List A matches for South Australia between 2004 and 2009.

== See also ==
- List of South Australian representative cricketers
