= Walter Watling =

Australian cricketer

Personal information
- Born: 13 March 1864; Adelaide, Australia
- Died: 19 December 1928 (aged 64)
- Source: Cricinfo, 29 September 2020

Walter Watling (13 March 1864 – 19 December 1928) was an Australian cricketer. He played in five first-class matches for South Australia between 1883 and 1889.

== See also ==
- List of South Australian representative cricketers
