= Ronald Parker (cricketer) =

Australian cricketer

Personal information
- Born: 23 February 1916; Adelaide, Australia
- Died: 27 August 1993 (aged 77); San Francisco, California, United States
- Source: Cricinfo, 18 September 2020

Ronald Parker (23 February 1916 – 27 August 1993) was an Australian cricketer. He played in thirteen first-class matches for South Australia between 1933 and 1937.

== See also ==
- List of South Australian representative cricketers
