= Stephen Rigaud (cricketer) =

Australian cricketer

Personal information
- Born: 25 November 1856; Kenton Valley, South Australia
- Died: 13 November 1922 (aged 65)
- Source: Cricinfo, 25 September 2020

Stephen Rigaud (25 November 1856 – 13 November 1922) was an Australian cricketer. He played in one first-class match for South Australia in 1877/78.

== See also ==
- List of South Australian representative cricketers
