= Hubert Chinner =

Australian cricketer (1870–1953)

Personal information
- Born: 30 August 1870; Adelaide, Australia
- Died: 12 June 1953 (aged 82); Adelaide, Australia
- Source: Cricinfo, 25 May 2018

Hubert Chinner (30 August 1870 – 12 June 1953) was an Australian cricketer. He played three first-class matches for South Australia between 1898 and 1900.

== See also ==
- List of South Australian representative cricketers
