= Cameron Williamson =

Australian cricketer (born 1970)

Personal information
- Born: 26 March 1970 (age 56); Sydney, Australia
- Source: Cricinfo, 30 September 2020

Cameron Williamson (born 26 March 1970) is an Australian cricketer. He played in two first-class matches for South Australia between 1990 and 1992.

== See also ==
- List of South Australian representative cricketers
