= Wally Catchlove =

Australian cricketer

Personal information
- Born: 24 February 1907; Adelaide, Australia
- Died: 12 April 1997 (aged 90); Adelaide, Australia
- Source: Cricinfo, 21 May 2018

Wally Catchlove (24 February 1907 – 12 April 1997) was an Australian cricketer. He played nine first-class matches for South Australia between 1931 and 1934.

== See also ==
- List of South Australian representative cricketers
