= Donald Henry (cricketer) =

Australian cricketer

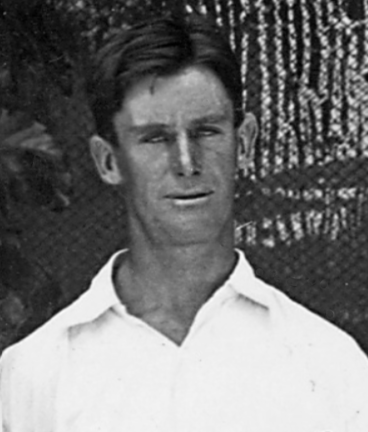

Personal information
- Born: 24 June 1885; Adelaide, Australia
- Died: 31 July 1973 (aged 88)
- Source: Cricinfo, 18 September 2020

Donald Henry (24 June 1885 – 31 July 1973) was an Australian cricketer. He played in three first-class matches for South Australia in 1920/21.

== See also ==
- List of South Australian representative cricketers
