= William Hewer (cricketer) =

Australian cricketer

Personal information
- Born: 7 May 1877; Adelaide, Australia
- Died: 2 June 1948 (aged 71); Wayville, South Australia
- Source: Cricinfo, 6 August 2020

William Hewer (7 May 1877 – 2 June 1948) was an Australian cricketer. He played in seven first-class matches for South Australia between 1898 and 1911.

== See also ==
- List of South Australian representative cricketers
