= Lavington Smith =

Australian cricketer

Personal information
- Born: 9 October 1904; Adelaide, Australia
- Died: 9 May 1953 (aged 48)
- Source: Cricinfo, 25 September 2020

Lavington Smith (9 October 1904 – 9 May 1953) was an Australian cricketer. He played in one first-class match for South Australia in 1933/34.

== See also ==
- List of South Australian representative cricketers
