= David Cameron Lovell =

Australian cricketer (born 1955)

Personal information
- Born: 17 February 1955 (age 71); Adelaide, Australia
- Source: Cricinfo, 12 August 2020

David Cameron Lovell (born 17 February 1955) is an Australian cricketer. He played in three first-class matches for South Australia in 1980/81.

== See also ==
- List of South Australian representative cricketers
