= Francis Teisseire =

Australian cricketer

Personal information
- Born: 8 July 1917; Adelaide, Australia
- Died: 23 November 1998 (aged 81)
- Source: Cricinfo, 28 September 2020

Francis Teisseire (8 July 1917 – 23 November 1998) was an Australian cricketer. He played in one first-class match for South Australia in 1939/40.

== See also ==
- List of South Australian representative cricketers
