= Charles Deverson =

Australian cricketer

Personal information
- Born: 2 November 1905; Adelaide, Australia
- Died: 2 February 1945 (aged 39); Adelaide, Australia
- Source: Cricinfo, 24 July 2018

Charles Deverson (2 November 1905 – 2 February 1945) was an Australian cricketer. He played three first-class matches for South Australia in 1930/31.

Charles Deverson lived in the Port Adelaide area all his life and played for Port Adelaide in the Adelaide cricket competition. He was a right-arm fast-medium bowler. Among his 10 wickets in Sheffield Shield cricket were those of Donald Bradman twice, for 61 and 121, in Deverson's second match, when he took 4 for 60 and 4 for 86.

He died suddenly at the age of 39, leaving a widow, three daughters and a son.

== See also ==
- List of South Australian representative cricketers
