= Vincent Gibson =

Australian cricketer

Personal information
- Born: 14 May 1916; Adelaide, Australia
- Died: 28 November 1983 (aged 67); Sydney, Australia
- Source: Cricinfo, 20 July 2020

Vincent Gibson (14 May 1916 – 28 November 1983) was an Australian cricketer. He played in eight first-class matches for South Australia between 1939 and 1947.

== See also ==
- List of South Australian representative cricketers
