= Kenneth Steele =

Australian cricketer

Personal information
- Born: 17 December 1889; Adelaide, Australia
- Died: 19 December 1956 (aged 67)
- Source: Cricinfo, 25 September 2020

Kenneth Steele (17 December 1889 – 19 December 1956) was an Australian cricketer. He played in two first-class matches for South Australia in 1913/14.

== See also ==
- List of South Australian representative cricketers
