= Haydn Smart =

Australian cricketer (born 1958)

Personal information
- Born: 26 November 1958 (age 67); Hobart, Australia
- Source: Cricinfo, 25 September 2020

Haydn Smart (born 26 November 1958) is an Australian cricketer. He played in one first-class match for South Australia in 1987/88.

== See also ==
- List of South Australian representative cricketers
