= Len Weekley =

Australian cricketer

Personal information
- Born: 21 July 1922; Adelaide, Australia
- Died: 7 June 2008 (aged 85)
- Source: Cricinfo, 30 September 2020

Len Weekley (21 July 1922 – 7 June 2008) was an Australian cricketer. He played in six first-class matches for South Australia between 1950 and 1957.

== See also ==
- List of South Australian representative cricketers
