= Garry Chillingworth =

Australian cricketer (born 1970)

Personal information
- Born: 23 January 1970 (age 56); Sydney, Australia
- Source: Cricinfo, 25 May 2018

Garry Chillingworth (born 23 January 1970) is an Australian cricketer. He played three first-class matches for South Australia in 1998/99.

== See also ==
- List of South Australian representative cricketers
