= Russ Parker =

Australian cricketer (born 1952)

Personal information
- Born: 3 August 1952 (age 74); Sudbury, England
- Source: Cricinfo, 18 September 2020

Russ Parker (born 3 August 1952) is an Australian cricketer. He played in nine first-class matches for South Australia between 1974 and 1979.

== See also ==
- List of South Australian representative cricketers
