= Malcolm Hodge =

Australian cricketer

Personal information
- Born: 28 August 1934 (age 92); Adelaide, Australia
- Source: Cricinfo, 6 August 2020

Malcolm Hodge (born 28 August 1934) is an Australian cricketer. He played in six first-class matches for South Australia in 1960/61.

== See also ==
- List of South Australian representative cricketers
