= Leslie Holton =

Australian cricketer

Personal information
- Full name: Leslie George Holton
- Born: 13 March 1903; Melbourne, Australia
- Died: 1 February 1956 (aged 52); Melbourne, Australia
- Source: Cricinfo, 9 August 2020

Leslie George "Jack" Holton (13 March 1903 – 1 February 1956) was an Australian cricketer. He played in two first-class matches for South Australia between 1929 and 1933. He gassed himself at his home.

== See also ==
- List of South Australian representative cricketers
