= David Kelly (Australian cricketer) =

Australian cricketer (born 1959)

Personal information
- Born: 28 January 1959 (age 67); Adelaide, Australia
- Source: Cricinfo, 9 August 2020

David Kelly (born 28 January 1959) is an Australian cricketer. He played in nineteen first-class and four List A matches for South Australia between 1984 and 1987.

== See also ==
- List of South Australian representative cricketers
