= John Frick =

Australian cricketer (born 1957)

Personal information
- Born: 24 March 1957 (age 69); Adelaide, South Australia

Domestic team information
- Years: Team
- 1976/77: South Australia
- Source: Cricinfo, 16 January 2019

John Frick (born 24 March 1957) is an Australian cricketer. He played four first-class matches for South Australia in 1976/77.

== See also ==
- List of South Australian representative cricketers
