= John Sangster (cricketer) =

Australian cricketer (born 1942)

Personal information
- Born: 21 January 1942 (age 84); Adelaide, Australia
- Source: Cricinfo, 25 September 2020

John Sangster (born 21 January 1942) is an Australian cricketer. He played in two first-class matches for South Australia between 1961 and 1963.

== See also ==
- List of South Australian representative cricketers
