= William Reid (South Australia cricketer) =

Australian cricketer

Personal information
- Born: 17 October 1867; Adelaide, Australia
- Died: 19 December 1943 (aged 76)
- Source: Cricinfo, 21 September 2020

William Reid (17 October 1867 – 19 December 1943) was an Australian cricketer. He played in one first-class match for South Australia in 1892/93.

== See also ==
- List of South Australian representative cricketers
