= Trevor Robertson =

Australian cricketer (born 1947)

Personal information
- Born: 20 November 1947 (age 78); Adelaide, Australia
- Source: Cricinfo, 25 September 2020

Trevor Robertson (born 20 November 1947) is an Australian cricketer. He played in 32 first-class matches for South Australia between 1977 and 1980.

== See also ==
- List of South Australian representative cricketers
