= Herbert Heairfield =

Australian cricketer

Personal information
- Born: 28 February 1907; Adelaide, Australia
- Died: 28 August 2006 (aged 99); Adelaide, South Australia
- Source: Cricinfo, 6 August 2020

Herbert Heairfield (28 February 1907 – 28 August 2006) was an Australian cricketer. He played in one first-class match for South Australia in 1940/41.

== See also ==
- List of South Australian representative cricketers
