= Tim Davey =

Australian cricketer (born 1987)

Personal information
- Born: 16 September 1987 (age 39)
- Source: Cricinfo, 24 July 2018

Tim Davey (born 16 September 1987) is an Australian cricketer. He played two first-class and five List A matches for South Australia between 2012 and 2014.

== See also ==
- List of South Australian representative cricketers
