= Arthur Richter =

Australian cricketer

Personal information
- Born: 1 September 1908; Nelshaby, Port Pirie, South Australia
- Died: 16 August 1936 (aged 27); Adelaide, Australia
- Source: Cricinfo, 25 September 2020

Arthur Richter (1 September 1908 – 16 August 1936) was an Australian cricketer. He played in one first-class match for South Australia in 1935/36.

Originally from Port Pirie, Richter died at age 27 from a kidney illness.

== See also ==
- List of South Australian representative cricketers
