= James King (Australian cricketer) =

Australian cricketer

Personal information
- Born: 23 May 1851; Adelaide, Australia
- Died: 28 June 1921 (aged 70); Adelaide, Australia
- Source: Cricinfo, 12 August 2020

James King (23 May 1851 – 28 June 1921) was an Australian cricketer. He played in eight first-class matches for South Australia between 1872 and 1885.

== See also ==
- List of South Australian representative cricketers
