= Barry Hiern =

Australian cricketer (born 1951)

Personal information
- Born: 8 August 1951 (age 75); Adelaide, Australia
- Source: Cricinfo, 6 August 2020

Barry Hiern (born 8 August 1951) is an Australian cricketer. He played in thirteen first-class matches for South Australia between 1972 and 1974.

== See also ==
- List of South Australian representative cricketers
