= Thomas Richards (cricketer) =

Australian cricketer

Personal information
- Born: 5 July 1855; Adelaide, Australia
- Died: 14 December 1923 (aged 68)
- Source: Cricinfo, 25 September 2020

Thomas Richards (5 July 1855 – 14 December 1923) was an Australian cricketer. He played in four first-class matches for South Australia between 1880 and 1884.

== See also ==
- List of South Australian representative cricketers
