= Daryl Lambert =

Australian cricketer (born 1946)

Personal information
- Born: 8 October 1946 (age 80); Adelaide, Australia
- Source: Cricinfo, 12 August 2020

Daryl Lambert (born 8 October 1946) is an Australian cricketer. He played in six first-class matches for South Australia between 1976 and 1978.

== See also ==
- List of South Australian representative cricketers
