= Raymond Holman (cricketer) =

Australian cricketer

Personal information
- Born: 17 September 1919; Adelaide, Australia
- Died: 19 September 1989 (aged 70); Woodville South, Australia
- Source: Cricinfo, 9 August 2020

Raymond Holman (17 September 1919 – 19 September 1989) was an Australian cricketer. He played in one first-class match for South Australia in 1940/41.

== See also ==
- List of South Australian representative cricketers
