= Darren Dempsey =

Australian cricketer (born 1975)

Personal information
- Born: 17 October 1975 (age 51); Mount Gambier, South Australia
- Source: Cricinfo, 24 July 2018

Darren Dempsey (born 17 October 1975) is an Australian former cricketer. He played three first-class matches for South Australia in 2001/02.

== See also ==
- List of South Australian representative cricketers
