= Victor Selth =

Australian cricketer

Personal information
- Born: 1 June 1895; Adelaide, Australia
- Died: 2 September 1967 (aged 72)
- Source: Cricinfo, 25 September 2020

Victor Selth (1 June 1895 – 2 September 1967) was an Australian cricketer. He played in two first-class matches for South Australia between 1918 and 1920.

== See also ==
- List of South Australian representative cricketers
