= Alfred Pretty =

Australian cricketer

Personal information
- Born: 29 January 1874; Adelaide, Australia
- Died: 21 June 1929 (aged 55)
- Source: Cricinfo, 21 September 2020

Alfred Pretty (29 January 1874 – 21 June 1929) was an Australian cricketer. He played in one first-class match for South Australia in the 1908/09 season.

== See also ==
- List of South Australian representative cricketers
