= Kenneth Webb (cricketer) =

Australian cricketer

Personal information
- Born: 27 February 1921; Adelaide, Australia
- Died: 7 March 1994 (aged 73)
- Source: Cricinfo, 29 September 2020

Kenneth Webb (27 February 1921 – 7 March 1994) was an Australian cricketer. He played in two first-class matches for South Australia in 1946/47.

== See also ==
- List of South Australian representative cricketers
