= Rick Massey =

Australian cricketer (born 1961)

Personal information
- Born: 5 June 1961 (age 65); Tamworth, New South Wales, Australia
- Source: Cricinfo, 19 August 2020

Rick Massey (born 5 June 1961) is an Australian former cricketer. He played in two first-class matches and one List A match for South Australia in 1983/84.

== See also ==
- List of South Australian representative cricketers
