= Robert Gilbourne =

Australian cricketer (born 1943)

Personal information
- Born: 16 July 1943 (age 83); Adelaide, Australia
- Source: Cricinfo, 20 July 2020

Robert Gilbourne (born 16 July 1943) is an Australian cricketer. He played in eleven first-class matches for South Australia between 1967 and 1972.

== See also ==
- List of South Australian representative cricketers
