= Reginald Teagle =

Australian cricketer

Personal information
- Born: 27 February 1909; Adelaide, Australia
- Died: 8 June 1987 (aged 78)
- Source: Cricinfo, 28 September 2020

Reginald Teagle (27 February 1909 – 8 June 1987) was an Australian cricketer. He played in two first-class matches for South Australia in 1930/31.

== See also ==
- List of South Australian representative cricketers
