= Peter Herbert (cricketer) =

Australian cricketer (born 1947)

Personal information
- Born: 8 January 1947 (age 79); Adelaide, Australia
- Source: Cricinfo, 6 August 2020

Peter Herbert (born 8 January 1947) is an Australian cricketer. He played in four first-class matches for South Australia in 1971/72.

== See also ==
- List of South Australian representative cricketers
