= Arthur Rosman =

Australian cricketer

Personal information
- Born: 26 November 1870; Adelaide, Australia
- Died: 10 January 1948 (aged 77)
- Source: Cricinfo, 25 September 2020

Arthur Rosman (26 November 1870 – 10 January 1948) was an Australian cricketer. He played in one first-class match for South Australia in 1898/99.

== See also ==
- List of South Australian representative cricketers
