= Robert Waters (cricketer) =

Australian cricketer

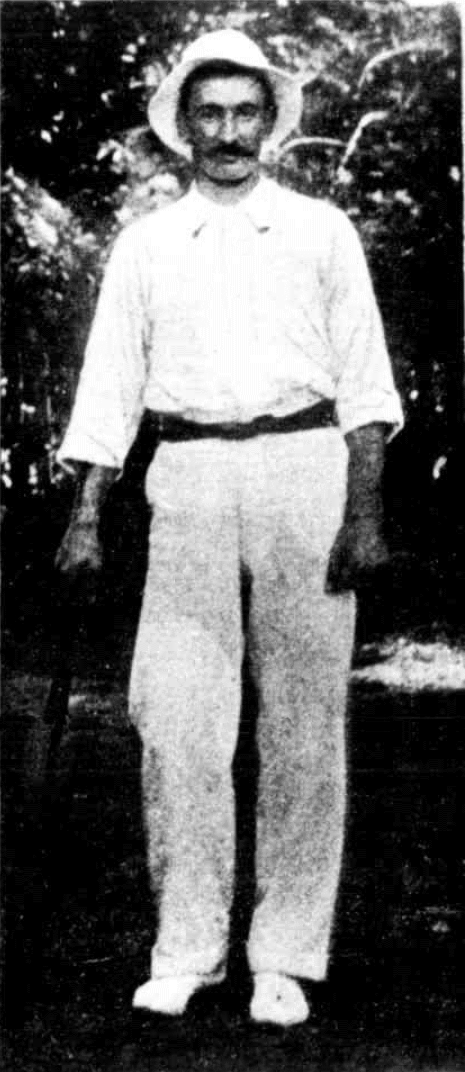

Personal information
- Born: 29 April 1874; Gravesend, Kent, England
- Died: 20 February 1912 (aged 37)
- Source: Cricinfo, 29 September 2020

Robert Waters (29 April 1874 – 20 February 1912) was an Australian cricketer. He played in four first-class matches for South Australia between 1901 and 1903.

== See also ==
- List of South Australian representative cricketers
