= Steve Gentle =

Australian cricketer (born 1955)

Personal information
- Born: 30 May 1955 (age 71); Adelaide, South Australia
- Source: Cricinfo, 18 February 2020

Steve Gentle (born 30 May 1955) is an Australian cricketer. He played in two first-class matches for South Australia between 1978 and 1984.

== See also ==
- List of South Australian representative cricketers
