= Donald McAllister (cricketer) =

Australian cricketer

Personal information
- Born: 19 November 1935 (age 90); Adelaide, Australia
- Source: Cricinfo, 19 August 2020

Donald McAllister (born 19 November 1935) is an Australian cricketer. He played in three first-class matches for South Australia in 1964/65.

== See also ==
- List of South Australian representative cricketers
