= Keith Gogler =

Australian cricketer

Personal information
- Born: 1 May 1923; Port Augusta, Australia
- Died: 24 August 1983 (aged 60); Glenelg North, Australia
- Source: Cricinfo, 20 July 2020

Keith Gogler (1 May 1923 – 24 August 1983) was an Australian cricketer. He played in nine first-class matches for South Australia between 1946 and 1949.

== See also ==
- List of South Australian representative cricketers
