= David Clarke (Australian cricketer) =

Australian cricketer (born 1970)

Personal information
- Born: 25 January 1970 (age 56); Adelaide, Australia
- Source: Cricinfo, 25 May 2018

David Clarke (born 25 January 1970) is an Australian cricketer. He played two first-class matches for South Australia between 1988 and 1990.

Clarke made a "sound" first-class debut against Western Australia as a teenager in 1988. Described as a "clever medium-pace bowler", he was named in the AIS team for matches against the Australian Capital Territory in 1989. At the time, he had been the top wicket-taker in South Australian club cricket for the last two seasons.

== See also ==
- List of South Australian representative cricketers
