= Richard Niehuus =

Australian cricketer

Personal information
- Born: 6 July 1917; Adelaide, Australia
- Died: 17 June 2005 (aged 87)
- Source: Cricinfo, 18 September 2020

Richard Niehuus (6 July 1917 – 17 June 2005) was an Australian cricketer. He played in ten first-class matches for South Australia between 1946 and 1948.

== See also ==
- List of South Australian representative cricketers
