= Garth Burton =

Australian cricketer

Personal information
- Born: 21 June 1913; Black Forest, South Australia
- Died: 6 September 1993 (aged 80); Adelaide, South Australia
- Batting: Right-handed
- Bowling: Right-arm fast-medium
- Role: Bowler

Domestic team information
- Years: Team
- 1939/40: South Australia

Career statistics
Competition	First-class
Matches	3
Runs scored	32
Batting average	16.00
100s/50s	0/0
Top score	11*
Balls bowled	618
Wickets	9
Bowling average	33.44
5 wickets in innings	1
10 wickets in match	0
Best bowling	5/99
Catches/stumpings	1/–
- Source: Cricinfo, 18 May 2018

Garth Burton (21 June 1913 – 6 September 1993) was an Australian cricketer. He played three first-class matches for South Australia during the 1939–40 season.
