= Brian Vincent (cricketer) =

Australian cricketer (born 1960)

Personal information
- Born: 16 February 1960 (age 66); Adelaide, Australia
- Source: Cricinfo, 29 September 2020

Brian Vincent (born 16 February 1960) is an Australian cricketer. He played in six first-class and five List A matches for South Australia between 1979 and 1982.

== See also ==
- List of South Australian representative cricketers
