= Walter Bullough =

Australian cricketer

Personal information
- Born: 21 October 1855; Hunslet, England
- Died: 17 September 1888 (aged 32); Adelaide, South Australia
- Batting: Left-handed
- Bowling: Left-arm

Domestic team information
- Years: Team
- 1880/81: South Australia

Career statistics
| Competition | First-class |
|---|---|
| Matches | 2 |
| Runs scored | 43 |
| Batting average | 14.33 |
| 100s/50s | 0/0 |
| Top score | 26* |
| Balls bowled | 434 |
| Wickets | 8 |
| Bowling average | 22.00 |
| 5 wickets in innings | 0 |
| 10 wickets in match | 0 |
| Best bowling | 3/54 |
| Catches/stumpings | 1/– |
- Source: Cricinfo, 18 May 2018

Walter Bullough (21 October 1855 – 17 September 1888) was an Australian cricketer. He played two first-class matches for South Australia in 1880/81.

He died suddenly in 1888 and was survived by a wife and five children, who were left unprovided for after his death. A call for admirers of his cricket career to donate for their well-being was advertised shortly after his death.
