= Craig Francis =

Australian cricketer (born 1966)

Personal information
- Full name: Craig Lawrence Francis
- Born: 25 November 1966 (age 59); North Adelaide, South Australia
- Batting: Right-handed
- Bowling: Right-arm legbreak, googly
- Role: Bowler

Domestic team information
- Years: Team
- 1989/90: South Australia

Career statistics
Competition	First-class
Matches	1
Runs scored	0
Batting average	–
100s/50s	–
Top score	–
Balls bowled	132
Wickets	0
Bowling average	–
5 wickets in innings	–
10 wickets in match	–
Best bowling	–
Catches/stumpings	0/–
- Source: Cricinfo, 16 January 2019

Craig Lawrence Francis (born 25 November 1966) is an Australian former cricketer. He played one first-class match for South Australia during the 1989–90 season.
