= Timothy Colley =

Australian cricketer

Personal information
- Born: 10 July 1935; Sydney, Australia
- Died: 5 June 2016 (aged 80); Bedford Park, South Australia, Australia
- Batting: Left-handed

Domestic team information
- Years: Team
- 1955/56: South Australia
- Source: Cricinfo, 4 June 2018

Timothy Peter Michael Colley (10 July 1935 – 5 June 2016) was an Australian cricketer. He played three first-class matches for South Australia in 1955/56.
