= Tom Birchall (cricketer) =

Australian cricketer (born 1962)

Personal information
- Full name: James Thomas Wardlaw Birchall
- Born: 23 November 1962 (age 63); Adelaide, South Australia
- Batting: Right-handed
- Role: Wicket-keeper

Domestic team information
- Years: Team
- 1986/87: South Australia

Career statistics
Competition	First-class	List A
Matches	3	2
Runs scored	10	10
Batting average	5.00	–
100s/50s	0/0	0/0
Top score	6	10*
Catches/stumpings	7/1	0/2
- Source: Cricinfo, 1 May 2018

James Thomas Wardlaw Birchall (born 23 November 1962) is an Australian former cricketer. He played three first-class matches for South Australia during the 1986–87 season.
