= David Ballans =

Australian cricketer

Personal information
- Full name: David Murray Ballans
- Born: 30 June 1868; At sea
- Died: 26 June 1957 (aged 88); Goodwood Park, South Australia
- Batting: Right-handed

Domestic team information
- Years: Team
- 1889/90–1892/93: South Australia

Career statistics
Competition	First-class
Matches	2
Runs scored	16
Batting average	5.33
100s/50s	0/0
Top score	15
Balls bowled	18
Wickets	0
Bowling average	–
5 wickets in innings	–
10 wickets in match	–
Best bowling	–
Catches/stumpings	0/–
- Source: Cricinfo, 24 April 2018

David Murray Ballans (30 June 1868 – 26 June 1957) was an Australian cricketer. He played two first-class matches for South Australia, one in each of the 1889–90 and 1892–93 seasons.
