= Matthew Minagall =

Australian cricketer

Personal information
- Full name: Matthew John Peter Minagall
- Born: 13 November 1971 (age 54); Woodville, South Australia
- Batting: Left-handed
- Bowling: Slow left-arm wrist-spin

Domestic team information
- Years: Team
- 1990-91 to 1997-98: South Australia

Career statistics
Competition	First-class
Matches	13
Runs scored	120
Batting average	10.00
100s/50s	0/0
Top score	43
Balls bowled	2429
Wickets	21
Bowling average	69.04
5 wickets in innings	1
10 wickets in match	1
Best bowling	7/152
Catches/stumpings	2/–
- Source: Cricinfo, 27 October 2019

Matthew John Peter Minagall (born 13 November 1971) is a former cricketer who played 13 matches of first-class cricket for South Australia from 1991 to 1998.

Minagall was a left-arm wrist-spinner who was never able to establish a place in the South Australian team. He had one outstanding match, when he took 7 for 152 and 4 for 111 against Tasmania in Adelaide in 1994-95.

Minagall is married to Shannon Minagall (nee Hebbard) and has 2 daughters, Montana and Jesse.
