= 1902–03 Sheffield Shield season =

Australian cricket

1902–03 Sheffield Shield
- Cricket format: First-class
- Tournament format: Double round-robin
- Champions: New South Wales (5th title)
- Participants: 3
- Matches: 6
- Most runs: Reggie Duff (New South Wales) – 583 runs
- Most wickets: Bill Howell (Victoria) – 26 wickets

The 1902–03 Sheffield Shield season was the 11th season of the Sheffield Shield, the domestic first-class cricket competition of Australia. New South Wales won the championship.

== Table ==
| Team | Pld | W | L | D |
|---|---|---|---|---|
| New South Wales | 4 | 4 | 0 | 0 |
| Victoria | 4 | 2 | 2 | 0 |
| South Australia | 4 | 0 | 4 | 0 |

== Fixtures ==
19–23 December 1902
Scorecard

| New South Wales | v | South Australia (H) |
| 285 (99.4 overs); Monty Noble 108; Ernie Jones 3/68 (25 overs) | | 140 (71.5 overs); Frederick Hack 48; Leslie Pye 4/31 (17 overs) |
| 229 (69.3 overs); Alick Mackenzie 77; Joe Travers 5/54 (25.3 overs) | | 164 (80.5 overs); Jack Reedman 40; Bill Howell 4/59 (28 overs) |

New South Wales won by 210 runs
Adelaide Oval, Adelaide
Umpires: John Quilty and Philip Argall

- New South Wales won the toss and elected to bat.

26–29 December 1902
Scorecard

| New South Wales | v | Victoria (H) |
| 198 (65.1 overs); Reggie Duff 102; Warwick Armstrong 3/45 (21 overs) | | 93 (33.4 overs); Harry Graham 32; Arthur McBeath 4/9 (9.4 overs) |
| 212 (63.3 overs); Reggie Duff 66; Frederick Collins 6/54 (19 overs) | | 181 (111.3 overs); Peter McAlister 37; Bill Howell 9/52 (30.3 overs) |

New South Wales won by 136 runs
Melbourne Cricket Ground, Melbourne
Umpires: Bob Crockett and W. A. Young

- New South Wales won the toss and elected to bat.

1–5 January 1903
Scorecard

| (H) Victoria | v | South Australia |
| 472 (140.2 overs); Mathew Ellis 118; Ernie Jones 4/134 (43 overs) | | 317 (98 overs); Clem Hill 124; Warwick Armstrong 2/71 (30 overs) |
| 164 (66.3 overs); David Mailer 49; Joe Travers 4/57 (28 overs) | | 140 (50.5 overs); Harold Kirkwood 44; Warwick Armstrong 5/20 (11.5 overs) |

Victoria won by 179 runs
Melbourne Cricket Ground, Melbourne
Umpires: Bob Crockett and E. J. Harvey

- Victoria won the toss and elected to bat.

9–13 January 1903
Scorecard

| South Australia | v | New South Wales (H) |
| 412 (170.5 overs); Frederick Hack 84; Arthur McBeath 5/110 (46 overs) | | 545 (134.5 overs); Victor Trumper 178; Robert Waters 3/53 (14.5 overs) |
| 134 (65.5 overs); Jack Reedman 42; Bill Howell 5/40 (21.5 overs) | | 0/4 (0 overs) |

New South Wales won by 10 wickets
Sydney Cricket Ground, Sydney
Umpires: E. J. Harvey and Richard Callaway

- South Australia won the toss and elected to bat.

24–29 January 1903
Scorecard

| Victoria | v | New South Wales (H) |
| 207 (86.1 overs); William Bruce 38; Leslie Pye 4/53 (23 overs) | | 367 (87.3 overs); Reggie Duff 132; Frederick Collins 5/85 (30.3 overs) |
| 427 (155.2 overs); Warwick Armstrong 118; Arthur McBeath 5/111 (41 overs) | | 5/269 (76.3 overs); Monty Noble 103*; Jack Saunders 3/94 (30 overs) |

New South Wales won by 5 wickets
Sydney Cricket Ground, Sydney
Umpires: Bob Crockett and Richard Callaway

- Victoria won the toss and elected to bat.

27 February – 4 March 1903
Scorecard

| Victoria | v | South Australia (H) |
| 291 (123.5 overs); John Stuckey 63; George Giffen 7/75 (37.5 overs) | | 278 (109.1 overs); Frederick Hack 88; Jack Saunders 5/88 (34.1 overs) |
| 244 (84.2 overs); Warwick Armstrong 66; George Giffen 8/110 (38.2 overs) | | 222 (118.3 overs); George Giffen 97*; Jack Saunders 8/106 (50 overs) |

Victoria won by 35 runs
Adelaide Oval, Adelaide
Umpires: Bob Crockett and G. S. Downs

- Victoria won the toss and elected to bat.

== Statistics ==
=== Most Runs ===
Reggie Duff 583

=== Most Wickets ===
Bill Howell 26
