= 1913–14 Sheffield Shield season =

Australian cricket tournament

1913–14 Sheffield Shield
- Cricket format: First-class
- Tournament format: Double round-robin
- Champions: New South Wales (13th title)
- Participants: 3
- Matches: 6
- Most runs: Charlie Macartney (New South Wales) – 445 runs
- Most wickets: Jack Crawford (South Australia) – 33 wickets

The 1913–14 Sheffield Shield season was the 22nd season of the Sheffield Shield, the domestic first-class cricket competition of Australia. New South Wales won the championship.

== Table ==
Team	Pld	W	L	D	Pts
New South Wales	4	3	1	0	2
South Australia	4	2	2	0	0
Victoria	4	1	3	0	-2

== Fixtures ==
19–23 December 1913
Scorecard

South Australia	v	New South Wales (H)
281 (70.1 overs); Jack Crawford 91; Charlie Kelleway 3/51 (17 overs)		307 (84.3 overs); Charlie Macartney 117; Jack Crawford 5/89 (36 overs)
290 (97.1 overs); Edgar Mayne 68; Bert Folkard 4/61 (24 overs)		245 (80.3 overs); Charlie Macartney 54; Jack Crawford 5/71 (35 overs)

South Australia won by 19 runs
Sydney Cricket Ground, Sydney
Umpires: C. W. Waugh and William Curran

- South Australia won the toss and elected to bat.

26–30 December 1913
Scorecard

South Australia	v	Victoria (H)
245 (105.2 overs); Edgar Mayne 58; Warwick Armstrong 4/51 (41 overs)		140 (45.1 overs); Warwick Armstrong 51*; Harold Kirkwood 6/76 (22.1 overs)
246 (105.5 overs); Donald Steele 84; Jimmy Matthews 3/46 (22.5 overs)		5/354 (119.1 overs); Warwick Armstrong 132; Harold Kirkwood 2/76 (27 overs)

Victoria won by 5 wickets
Melbourne Cricket Ground, Melbourne
Umpires: Bob Crockett and William Bruton

- South Australia won the toss and elected to bat.

1–3 January 1914
Scorecard

New South Wales	v	Victoria (H)
409 (137.5 overs); Warren Bardsley 124*; Jack Ryder 5/138 (38.5 overs)		151 (46.4 overs); Warwick Armstrong 34; Charlie Kelleway 3/15 (12.4 overs)
		199 f/o (64.2 overs); Fred Baring 122; Charlie Kelleway 3/16 (8.2 overs)

New South Wales won by an innings and 59 runs
Melbourne Cricket Ground, Melbourne
Umpires: Bob Crockett and H. J. Alessio

- New South Wales won the toss and elected to bat.

9–12 January 1914
Scorecard

(H) South Australia	v	New South Wales
189 (65 overs); Donald Steele 42; Jack Massie 6/68 (26 overs)		297 (96.2 overs); Herbie Collins 111; Jack Crawford 7/78 (32.2 overs)
118 (44.2 overs); Jack Crawford 34; Jack Massie 4/57 (22 overs)		1/12 (4 overs); Charlie Macartney 5*

New South Wales won by 9 wickets
Adelaide Oval, Adelaide
Umpires: A. McIntyre and J. G. Wagstaff

- South Australia won the toss and elected to bat.

23–28 January 1914
Scorecard

(H) New South Wales	v	Victoria
675 (173.2 overs); Charlie Macartney 201; Warwick Armstrong 4/127 (46.2 overs)		332 (136.1 overs); Warwick Armstrong 87; Jack Massie 6/93 (41 overs)
		311 f/o (107.2 overs); Fred Baring 71; Jack Massie 4/75 (31 overs)

New South Wales won by an innings and 32 runs
Sydney Cricket Ground, Sydney
Umpires: Alfred Jones and C. W. Waugh

- New South Wales won the toss and elected to bat.

13–17 February 1914
Scorecard

(H) South Australia	v	Victoria
274 (74.3 overs); Clem Hill 105; Jack Ryder 7/88 (23.3 overs)		213 (71.3 overs); Fred Baring 71; Jack Crawford 5/48 (23.3 overs)
349 (83.3 overs); Clem Hill 60; John Fitzpatrick 4/43 (7.3 overs)		324 (98.3 overs); Jack Ryder 105; Jack Crawford 6/97 (33 overs)

South Australia won by 86 runs
Adelaide Oval, Adelaide
Umpires: A. McIntyre and A. W. Hele

- South Australia won the toss and elected to bat.

== Statistics ==
=== Most Runs ===
Charlie Macartney 445

=== Most Wickets ===
Jack Crawford 33
