= 1900–01 Sheffield Shield season =

Australian cricket tournament

1900–01 Sheffield Shield
- Cricket format: First-class
- Tournament format: Double round-robin
- Champions: Victoria (5th title)
- Participants: 3
- Matches: 6
- Most runs: Clem Hill (South Australia) – 620 runs
- Most wickets: Jack Saunders (Victoria); Joe Travers (South Australia) – 29 wickets

The 1900–01 Sheffield Shield season was the ninth season of the Sheffield Shield, the domestic first-class cricket competition of Australia. Victoria won the championship. In January 1901, in the match between New South Wales and South Australia, New South Wales scored 918 runs in their first innings, with five batsmen scoring centuries.

== Table ==
| Team | Pld | W | L | D |
|---|---|---|---|---|
| Victoria | 4 | 4 | 0 | 0 |
| New South Wales | 4 | 1 | 3 | 0 |
| South Australia | 4 | 1 | 3 | 0 |

== Fixtures ==
10–14 November 1900
Scorecard

| (H) South Australia | v | Victoria |
| 267 (106.3 overs); James Matthews 79; Charlie McLeod 6/100 (44.3 overs) | | 403 (125.4 overs); Warwick Armstrong 118; Joe Travers 4/93 (42 overs) |
| 197 (101.1 overs); Clem Hill 70; Jack Saunders 3/56 (34.1 overs) | | 2/62 (28 overs); Charles Ross 22; Ernie Jones 1/11 (11 overs) |

Victoria won by 8 wickets
Adelaide Oval, Adelaide
Umpires: Bob Crockett and G. S. Downs

- South Australia won the toss and elected to bat.

15–19 December 1900
Scorecard

| New South Wales | v | South Australia (H) |
| 279 (93.3 overs); Bert Hopkins 65; Jack Reedman 4/32 (12.3 overs) | | 576 (164 overs); Clem Hill 365*; Jack Marsh 5/181 (53 overs) |
| 261 (93.1 overs); Syd Gregory 81; Joe Travers 6/74 (31.1 overs) |

South Australia won by an innings and 36 runs
Adelaide Oval, Adelaide
Umpires: Richard Callaway and T. A. Reeves

- New South Wales won the toss and elected to bat.

24–27 December 1900
Scorecard

| New South Wales | v | Victoria (H) |
| 153 (52 overs); Syd Gregory 66*; Jack Saunders 6/70 (23 overs) | | 154 (70 overs); Warwick Armstrong 50; Bert Hopkins 4/37 (16 overs) |
| 135 (52 overs); Monty Noble 55; Hugh Trumble 7/54 (26 overs) | | 5/135 (41.3 overs); Hugh Trumble 45*; Jack Marsh 3/52 (17 overs) |

Victoria won by 5 wickets
Melbourne Cricket Ground, Melbourne
Umpires: Bob Crockett and Richard Callaway

- New South Wales won the toss and elected to bat.

31 December 1900 – 3 January 1901
Scorecard

| (H) Victoria | v | South Australia |
| 76 (44.4 overs); Harry Graham 22; Joe Travers 9/30 (22.4 overs) | | 107 (50.4 overs); Clem Hill 46; Frank Laver 4/10 (11.4 overs) |
| 446 (148.5 overs); Harry Graham 120; James Matthews 5/95 (26.5 overs) | | 177 (69.4 overs); Bertram Bailey 43; Jack Saunders 5/38 (20 overs) |

Victoria won by 238 runs
Melbourne Cricket Ground, Melbourne
Umpires: Bob Crockett and Philip Argall

- Victoria won the toss and elected to bat.

5–9 January 1901
Scorecard

| South Australia | v | New South Wales (H) |
| 157 (46.1 overs); Bertram Bailey 57; Jack Marsh 5/34 (16 overs) | | 918 (208 overs); Syd Gregory 168; Joe Travers 4/197 (69 overs) |
| 156 (47.2 overs); Fred Jarvis 49; Jack Marsh 5/59 (20 overs) |

New South Wales won by an innings and 605 runs
Sydney Cricket Ground, Sydney
Umpires: Philip Argall and Richard Callaway

- South Australia won the toss and elected to bat.

1–6 February 1901
Scorecard

| (H) New South Wales | v | Victoria |
| 170 (69.1 overs); Monty Noble 43; Jack Saunders 5/78 (30 overs) | | 279 (77.5 overs); John Stuckey 130*; Arthur McBeath 3/26 (12.5 overs) |
| 452 (129.2 overs); Victor Trumper 230; Jack Saunders 4/127 (39 overs) | | 9/344 (122.3 overs); Jack Worrall 90; Arthur McBeath 3/57 (26 overs) |

Victoria won by 1 wicket
Sydney Cricket Ground, Sydney
Umpires: Bob Crockett and S. P. Jones

- New South Wales won the toss and elected to bat.

== Statistics ==
=== Most Runs ===
Clem Hill 620

=== Most Wickets ===
Jack Saunders 29 & Ike Travers 29
