= 1899–1900 Sheffield Shield season =

Australian cricket tournament

1899–1900 Sheffield Shield
- Cricket format: First-class
- Tournament format: Double round-robin
- Champions: New South Wales (3rd title)
- Participants: 3
- Matches: 6
- Most runs: Monty Noble (New South Wales) – 515 runs
- Most wickets: Monty Noble (New South Wales); Hugh Trumble (Victoria); George Giffen (South Australia) – 24 wickets

The 1899–1900 Sheffield Shield season was the eighth season of the Sheffield Shield, the domestic first-class cricket competition of Australia. New South Wales won the championship.

== Table ==
Team	Pld	W	L	D
New South Wales	4	3	1	0
Victoria	4	2	2	0
South Australia	4	1	3	0

== Fixtures ==
24–30 November 1899
Scorecard

Victoria	v	South Australia (H)
360 (153.4 overs); Harry Graham 118; George Giffen 4/101 (51.4 overs)		204 (102.3 overs); Jack Reedman 44; Frederick Collins 6/81 (42.3 overs)
408 (157.1 overs); John Stuckey 94; George Giffen 5/145 (57 overs)		318 (111.1 overs); Frederick Hack 115; Hugh Trumble 4/101 (42 overs)

Victoria won by 246 runs
Adelaide Oval, Adelaide
Umpires: Bob Crockett and T. A. Reeves

- Victoria won the toss and elected to bat.

16–20 December 1899
Scorecard

(H) South Australia	v	New South Wales
155 (77.5 overs); Ernest Leak 40*; Bill Howell 5/52 (32.5 overs)		807 (217.1 overs); Monty Noble 200; George Giffen 8/287 (77.1 overs)
260 (105 overs); Jack Reedman 83; Leslie Pye 4/71 (34 overs)

New South Wales won by an innings and 392 runs
Adelaide Oval, Adelaide
Umpires: Philip Argall and Richard Callaway

- South Australia won the toss and elected to bat.

23–28 December 1899
Scorecard

New South Wales	v	Victoria (H)
520 (189.3 overs); Monty Noble 122; Hugh Trumble 5/149 (63.3 overs)		131 (58.2 overs); Harry Graham 39; Monty Noble 4/27 (12.2 overs)
		115 f/o (50.5 overs); Jack Worrall 45; Bert Hopkins 5/24 (6.5 overs)

New South Wales won by an innings and 274 runs
Melbourne Cricket Ground, Melbourne
Umpires: Bob Crockett and Richard Callaway

- New South Wales won the toss and elected to bat.

30 December 1899 – 4 January 1900
Scorecard

(H) Victoria	v	South Australia
353 (141 overs); Hugh Trumble 95; Ernie Jones 3/119 (49 overs)		250 (104.1 overs); Fred Jarvis 66; Frederick Collins 4/46 (22 overs)
298 (116.3 overs); Harry Graham 77; Jack Reedman 5/92 (37 overs)		220 (78.3 overs); Clem Hill 126*; Jack Saunders 6/71 (24.3 overs)

Victoria won by 181 runs
Melbourne Cricket Ground, Melbourne
Umpires: Bob Crockett and Philip Argall

- Victoria won the toss and elected to bat.

6–12 January 1900
Scorecard

(H) New South Wales	v	South Australia
214 (69.3 overs); Victor Trumper 45; George Giffen 5/59 (17 overs)		197 (78.4 overs); Clem Hill 67; Monty Noble 4/68 (25.4 overs)
317 (100 overs); Frank Iredale 75; Ernie Jones 6/88 (37 overs)		4/335 (113.4 overs); Frederick Hack 158*; Bill Howell 1/57 (26 overs)

South Australia won by 6 wickets
Sydney Cricket Ground, Sydney
Umpires: Charles Bannerman and Philip Argall

- South Australia won the toss and elected to field.

26–31 January 1900
Scorecard

(H) New South Wales	v	Victoria
271 (85.5 overs); Reggie Duff 75; Jack Saunders 3/85 (25 overs)		309 (118.3 overs); Hugh Trumble 87; Arthur McBeath 6/94 (41.3 overs)
412 (181 overs); Monty Noble 155; Hugh Trumble 4/112 (61 overs)		263 (106.5 overs); John Stuckey 53; Monty Noble 6/91 (39 overs)

New South Wales won by 111 runs
Sydney Cricket Ground, Sydney
Umpires: Bob Crockett and Charles Bannerman

- New South Wales won the toss and elected to bat.

== Statistics ==
=== Most Runs ===
Monty Noble 515

=== Most Wickets ===
Monty Noble 24, Hugh Trumble 24 & George Giffen 24
