= 1901–02 Sheffield Shield season =

Australian cricket tournament

1901–02 Sheffield Shield
- Cricket format: First-class
- Tournament format: Double round-robin
- Champions: New South Wales (4th title)
- Participants: 3
- Matches: 5
- Most runs: Clem Hill (South Australia) – 264 runs
- Most wickets: Arthur McBeath (New South Wales) – 20 wickets

The 1901–02 Sheffield Shield season was the tenth season of the Sheffield Shield, the domestic first-class cricket competition of Australia. New South Wales won the championship.

== Table ==
Team	Pld	W	L	D	NP
New South Wales	4	4	0	0	0
Victoria	3	1	2	0	1
South Australia	3	0	3	0	1

== Fixtures ==
22–27 November 1901
Scorecard

South Australia	v	Victoria (H)
410 (162.2 overs); Frederick Hack 110; Charlie McLeod 5/126 (50 overs)		464 (156.5 overs); John Stuckey 130; Ernie Jones 5/148 (55 overs)
259 (90 overs); Frederick Hack 60; Jack Saunders 3/71 (28 overs)		5/208 (93.3 overs); Peter McAlister 100*; Ernie Jones 3/74 (26 overs)

Victoria won by 5 wickets
Melbourne Cricket Ground, Melbourne
Umpires: George Watson and W. A. Young

- South Australia won the toss and elected to bat.

30 November – 3 December 1901
Scorecard

(H) New South Wales	v	South Australia
438 (141 overs); Charles Gregory 87; Ernie Jones 4/121 (48 overs)		119 (48.4 overs); Clem Hill 50; Arthur McBeath 6/36 (15.4 overs)
		221 f/o (69.1 overs); Harold Kirkwood 46; Arthur McBeath 4/84 (27 overs)

New South Wales won by an innings and 98 runs
Sydney Cricket Ground, Sydney
Umpires: George Watson and Richard Callaway

- New South Wales won the toss and elected to bat.

26–30 December 1901
Scorecard

New South Wales	v	Victoria (H)
221 (80 overs); Victor Trumper 73; Hugh Trumble 4/66 (27 overs)		300 (130 overs); Warwick Armstrong 137; Monty Noble 7/44 (33 overs)
231 (91.4 overs); Reggie Duff 51; Frank Laver 5/41 (22.4 overs)		110 (73.1 overs); Hugh Trumble 28; Bill Howell 4/40 (33 overs)

New South Wales won by 42 runs
Melbourne Cricket Ground, Melbourne
Umpires: Bob Crockett and Richard Callaway

- New South Wales won the toss and elected to bat.

10–14 January 1902
Scorecard

New South Wales	v	South Australia (H)
472 (141.4 overs); Syd Gregory 182; Joe Travers 5/105 (43.4 overs)		262 (109.4 overs); George Giffen 50; Bill Howell 4/54 (21.4 overs)
		191 f/o (51.5 overs); Harold Kirkwood 66; Monty Noble 4/27 (10 overs)

New South Wales won by an innings and 19 runs
Adelaide Oval, Adelaide
Umpires: G. S. Downs and Richard Callaway

- New South Wales won the toss and elected to bat.

25–29 January 1902
Scorecard

(H) New South Wales	v	Victoria
327 (98.2 overs); Bert Hopkins 117; Jack Saunders 6/57 (24 overs)		152 (56.1 overs); William McCormack 33*; Alexander Kermode 4/49 (20 overs)
199 (73 overs); Frank Meares 55; Jack Saunders 5/73 (31 overs)		325 (120.4 overs); Jack Worrall 106; Gother Clarke 4/110 (30.4 overs)

New South Wales won by 49 runs
Sydney Cricket Ground, Sydney
Umpires: Bob Crockett and Richard Callaway

- New South Wales won the toss and elected to bat.

== Statistics ==
=== Most Runs ===
Clem Hill 264

=== Most Wickets ===
Arthur McBeath 20
