= 1902 in sports =

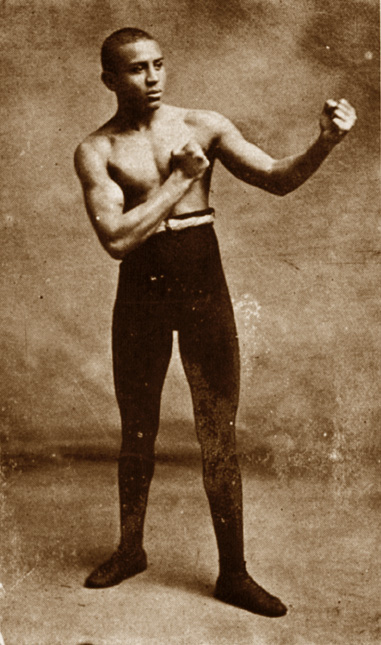
World lightweight boxing champion Joe Gans

1902 in sports describes the year's events in world sport.

== American football ==
College championship

- Rose Bowl (1901 season):
  - The Michigan Wolverines won 49–0 over the Stanford Indians to win the college football national championship
- Michigan Wolverines – college football national championship

Professional championships

- National Football League champions – Pittsburgh Stars
- Ohio League champions – Akron East Ends

Events

- 1 January — inaugural Rose Bowl game is played at Pasadena, California
- September — the first professional football league, the National Football League (1902), which is unrelated to the current NFL, is formed from three teams based in Pennsylvania and who are backed by Major League Baseball. The league folds a few months later.
- 21 November — the Philadelphia Football Athletics defeated the Kanaweola Athletic Club of Elmira, New York, 39–0, in the first ever professional American football night game.
- 29 November — the Pittsburgh Stars defeated the Philadelphia Football Athletics, 11–0, at the Pittsburgh Coliseum, to win the 1902 National Football League championship.
- 28 December — the Syracuse Athletic Club defeated the New York Philadelphians, 5–0, in the first indoor professional American football game, which was held at Madison Square Garden.

== Association football ==
Brazil

- Fluminense FC was founded in Laranjeiras area, Rio de Janeiro.

England

- The Football League – Sunderland 44 points, Everton 41, Newcastle United 37, Blackburn Rovers 36, Nottingham Forest 35, Derby County 35
- FA Cup final – Sheffield United 2–1 Southampton at Crystal Palace, London (replay following 1–1 draw at Crystal Palace)
- 26 April — shortly after being saved from bankruptcy, Newton Heath changes its name to Manchester United

Scotland

- Scottish Football League – Rangers
- Scottish Cup final – Hibernian 1–0 Celtic at Celtic Park

Spain

- 10 March — foundation of Real Madrid as Madrid Fútbol Club

== Athletics ==
- Sammy Mellor wins the sixth running of the Boston Marathon.

== Australian rules football ==
VFL Premiership

- Collingwood wins the 6th VFL Premiership: Collingwood 9.6 (60) d Essendon 3.9 (27) at Melbourne Cricket Ground (MCG)
- With a handful of exceptions, all VFL/AFL Grand Finals are played at the MCG from 1902

== Baseball ==
National championship

- National League championship – Pittsburgh Pirates
- American League championship – Philadelphia Athletics

Events

- 23 April — infielder Lou Castro debuts with the Philadelphia Athletics in the American League as the first Latin-American to play in Major League Baseball
- Winnipeg Maroons wins the inaugural Northern League Championship in the minor leagues

== Boxing ==
Events

- Joe Gans wins the World Lightweight Championship by knocking out Frank Erne in the first round. Gans successfully defends the title five times by the end of the year.
- 25 July — James J. Jeffries defeats Bob Fitzsimmons by an eighth-round knockout in San Francisco, Fitzsimmons failing in his bid to recover the World Heavyweight Championship

Lineal world champions

- World Heavyweight Championship – James J. Jeffries
- World Middleweight Championship – Tommy Ryan
- World Welterweight Championship – Barbados Joe Walcott
- World Lightweight Championship – Frank Erne → Joe Gans
- World Featherweight Championship – Young Corbett II
- World Bantamweight Championship – Harry Forbes

== Canadian Football ==
- The ORFU is reduced to two teams after Hamilton ceases play after the first game of the season.
- Ontario Rugby Football Union - Ottawa Rough Riders
- Quebec Rugby Football Union - Ottawa College
- Manitoba Rugby Football Union - Winnipeg Rowing Club
- Intercollegiate Rugby Football Union - McGill
- Dominion Championship - The Ottawa Rough Riders defeat Ottawa College 5-0

== Cricket ==
Events

- No cricket is played in South Africa due to the Boer War.
- Australia defeats England in The Ashes by 2 Tests to 1 after the first two Tests have been rained off. In one of the most famous Test series in history, the final three matches are full of drama with Victor Trumper scoring a century before lunch in the Third Test, Australia winning the Fourth Test by just 3 runs and England winning the Fifth Test by one wicket following a century in only 75 minutes by Gilbert Jessop.

England

- County Championship – Yorkshire
- Minor Counties Championship – Wiltshire
- Most runs – Victor Trumper 2570 @ 48.49 (HS 128)
- Most wickets – Wilfred Rhodes 213 @ 13.15 (BB 8–26)
- Wisden Cricketers of the Year – Warwick Armstrong, Cuthbert Burnup, James Iremonger, James Kelly, Victor Trumper

Australia

- Sheffield Shield – New South Wales
- Most runs – Clem Hill 1035 @ 51.75 (HS 107)
- Most wickets – Len Braund 62 @ 28.69 (BB 6–90)

India

- Bombay Presidency – Europeans shared with Parsees

South Africa

- Currie Cup – not contested

West Indies

- Inter-Colonial Tournament – not contested

== Figure skating ==
World Figure Skating Championships

- World Men's Champion – Ulrich Salchow (Sweden)

== Golf ==
Major tournaments

- British Open – Sandy Herd
- US Open – Laurie Auchterlonie, who becomes the first golfer to break 80 in all four rounds of the US Open

Other tournaments

- British Amateur – Charles Hutchings
- US Amateur – Louis N. James

== Horse racing ==
England

- Grand National – Shannon Lass
- 1,000 Guineas Stakes – Sceptre
- 2,000 Guineas Stakes – Sceptre
- The Derby – Ard Patrick
- The Oaks – Sceptre
- St. Leger Stakes – Sceptre

Australia

- Melbourne Cup – The Victory

Canada

- King's Plate – Lyddite

Ireland

- Irish Grand National – Patlander
- Irish Derby Stakes – St. Brendan

USA

- Kentucky Derby – Alan-a-Dale
- Preakness Stakes – Old England
- Belmont Stakes – Masterman

== Ice hockey ==
Stanley Cup

- Winnipeg Victorias successfully defends the Stanley Cup, defeating Toronto Wellingtons in a Cup challenge by two games to nil in a best-of-three series
- March – Winnipeg Victorias wins the Manitoba Hockey Association championship to retain the Stanley Cup
- 1 March — Montreal HC wins the Canadian Amateur Hockey League (CAHL) championship and challenges Winnipeg
- 13–17 March — Montreal and Winnipeg play a best-of-three series for the Stanley Cup, Montreal winning by two games to one to claim the Stanley Cup for the first time since 1894

== Motor racing ==
Paris-Vienna Trail

- The Paris-Vienna Trail is run on 26–29 June over 990 km and won by Marcel Renault (France) driving a Renault in a time of 15:47:43. The race is in retrospect sometimes referred to as the VII Grand Prix de l'ACF.

Gordon Bennett Cup

- The third Gordon Bennett Cup is run from Paris to Innsbruck and won by Selwyn Edge (Great Britain) driving a Napier 30hp.

Circuit des Ardennes

- The inaugural Circuit des Ardennes is run on 31 July 1902 in the vicinity of Bastogne. The total distance is 512.05 km (i.e., 85.34 km x 6 laps). The winner is Charles Jarrott (Great Britain), driving a Panhard-Levassor 70 hp in a time of 5:53:39.

Great Britain

- The first motor race in Great Britain is held at Bexhill-on-Sea with more than 200 entries.

== Rowing ==
The Boat Race

- 22 March — Cambridge wins the 59th Oxford and Cambridge Boat Race

== Rugby league ==
Events

- Featherstone Rovers founded

England

- Championship – Broughton Rangers
- Challenge Cup final – Broughton Rangers 25–0 Salford at Athletic Grounds, Rochdale
- Lancashire League Championship – Wigan
- Yorkshire League Championship – Leeds

== Rugby union ==
Home Nations Championship

- 20th Home Nations Championship series is won by Wales

== Speed skating ==
Speed Skating World Championships

- Men's All-round Champion – none declared

== Tennis ==
England

- Wimbledon Men's Singles Championship – Laurence Doherty (GB) defeats Arthur Gore (GB) 6–4 6–3 3–6 6–0
- Wimbledon Women's Singles Championship – Muriel Robb (GB) defeats Charlotte Cooper Sterry (GB) 7–5 6–1

France

- French Men's Singles Championship – Michel Vacherot (France) defeats Max Decugis (France) 6–4 6–2
- French Women's Singles Championship – Françoise Masson (France) defeats P. Girod (France): details unknown

USA

- American Men's Singles Championship – William Larned (USA) defeats Reginald Doherty (GB) 4–6 6–2 6–4 8–6
- American Women's Singles Championship – Marion Jones (USA) defeats Elisabeth Moore (USA) 6–1 1–0 retired

Davis Cup

- 1902 International Lawn Tennis Challenge – United States 3–2 British Isles at Crescent Athletic Club (grass) Brooklyn, United States
