= English cricket team in Australia in 1911–12 =

International cricket tour

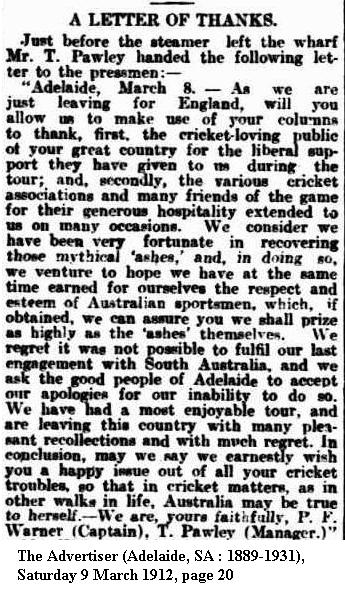
Letter of thanks from the English Captain P.F. Warner for the tour

An English cricket team toured Australia in 1911–12. It was led by Plum Warner, but Johnny Douglas took over the captaincy for all five Test matches when Warner fell ill early in the tour. Despite losing the first Test at Sydney, a side which included Jack Hobbs, Frank Woolley, Sydney Barnes and Wilfred Rhodes hit back to win the remaining four Tests. They thus regained The Ashes.

Frank Foster and Barnes dominated with the ball, sharing 66 wickets out of the 95 Australian wickets which fell. Warner wrote: "Finer bowling than theirs I have never seen on hard, true wickets." Hobbs (3), Rhodes, Woolley and Jack Hearne recorded centuries.

Barnes dismissed Bardsley, Kelleway, Hill and Armstrong for 3 runs in his opening spell on the first morning of the second Test. Later in the game, when the crowd barracked Barnes for deliberating over a field setting, he threw the ball down in disgust and refused to continue until order was restored. Hobbs and Rhodes shared an opening stand of 147 in the third Test at Adelaide. They exceeded this with 323 at Melbourne in the next Test, which remains the record for England's first wicket against Australia. Frank Woolley hit 305* in 205 minutes in a tour game against Tasmania.

For Australia, the outstanding performer was "Ranji" Hordern, who took 32 wickets in the Test series. He had match figures of 12 for 135 in the first Test, assisting Australia to their only win of the series. In the final game he took 10 for 161. None of the Australian batsmen shone. Victor Trumper made their only century, but his average for the series was just under thirty.

The tour was organised by the Marylebone Cricket Club and matches outside the Tests were played under the MCC name.

== Test series summary ==
Match length: Timeless. Balls per over: 6. Series result: England won 4–1.

=== First Test ===
15–21 December 1911
(Timeless Test)
Scorecard

Australia	v	England
447 (127 overs); VT Trumper 113; SF Barnes 3/107 (35 overs)		318 (101.5 overs); JW Hearne 76; HV Hordern 5/85 (27 overs)
308 (104.3 overs); C Kelleway 70; FR Foster 5/92 (31.3 overs)		291 (123.2 overs); G Gunn 62; HV Hordern 7/90 (42.2 overs)

Australia won by 146 runs
Sydney Cricket Ground, Sydney
Umpires: RM Crockett and WG Curran

- Australia won the toss and elected to bat.
- 17 December was taken as a rest day
- RB Minnett (AUS), and S Kinneir, CP Mead, JW Hearne, FR Foster and JWHT Douglas (all ENG) made their Test debuts.

=== Second Test ===
30 December 1911–3 January 1912
(Timeless Test)
Scorecard

Australia	v	England
184 (62.1 overs); HV Hordern 49*; SF Barnes 5/44 (23 overs)		265 (98.1 overs); JW Hearne 114; HV Hordern 4/66 (23.1 overs)
299 (91.1 overs); WW Armstrong 90; FR Foster 6/91 (38 overs)		219/2 (67.1 overs); JB Hobbs 126*; WJ Whitty 1/37 (18 overs)

England won by 8 wickets
Melbourne Cricket Ground, Melbourne
Umpires: RM Crockett and DA Elder

- Australia won the toss and elected to bat.
- 31 December was taken as a rest day
- EJ Smith and JW Hitch (both ENG) made their Test debuts.

=== Third Test ===
12–17 January 1912
(Timeless Test)
Scorecard

Australia	v	England
133 (60 overs); WW Armstrong 33; FR Foster 5/36 (26 overs)		501 (177.1 overs); JB Hobbs 187; A Cotter 4/125 (43 overs)
476 (153.4 overs); C Hill 98; SF Barnes 5/105 (46.4 overs)		112/3 (42.2 overs); W Rhodes 57*; C Kelleway 1/8 (7 overs)

England won by 7 wickets
Adelaide Oval, Adelaide
Umpires: RM Crockett and GA Watson

- Australia won the toss and elected to bat.
- 14 January was taken as a rest day
- TJ Matthews (AUS) made his Test debut.

=== Fourth Test ===
9–13 February 1912
(Timeless Test)
Scorecard

Australia	v	England
191 (65.1 overs); RB Minnett 56; SF Barnes 5/74 (29.1 overs)		589 (190.5 overs); W Rhodes 179; RB Minnett 3/59 (20 overs)
173 (61.5 overs); H Carter 38; JWHT Douglas 5/46 (17.5 overs)

England won by an innings and 225 runs
Melbourne Cricket Ground, Melbourne
Umpires: RM Crockett and WA Young

- England won the toss and elected to field.
- 11 February was taken as a rest day.
- J Vine (ENG) made his Test debut.

=== Fifth Test ===
23 February–1 March 1912
(Timeless Test)
Scorecard

England	v	Australia
324 (129 overs); FE Woolley 133*; HV Hordern 5/95 (37 overs)		176 (53 overs); WW Armstrong 33; SF Barnes 3/56 (19 overs)
214 (70.3 overs); G Gunn 61; HV Hordern 5/66 (25 overs)		292 (102.1 overs); RB Minnett 61; FR Foster 4/43 (30.1 overs)

England won by 70 runs
Sydney Cricket Ground, Sydney
Umpires: RM Crockett and AC Jones

- England won the toss and elected to bat.
- 25 February was taken as a rest day
- There was no play on the third and sixth days.
- JW McLaren (AUS) made his Test debut.

== Ceylon ==
The English team had a stopover in Colombo en route to Australia and on 21 October played a single-innings match (i.e., not first-class) there against the Ceylon national team. MCC won by 154 runs.
