= 1911–12 Ashes series =

1911–12 Ashes series may refer to:

- Cricket's 1911–12 Ashes series which was contested by the English cricket team in Australia in 1911–12
- Rugby league's 1911–12 Ashes series which was contested during the 1911–12 Kangaroo tour of Great Britain
