= Henry Hill (Australian cricketer) =

Australian cricketer

Personal information
- Born: 7 July 1878; Adelaide, South Australia
- Died: 30 October 1906 (aged 28); Kensington Park, South Australia
- Batting: Right-handed
- Bowling: Right-arm
- Role: Bowler
- Relatives: Clem Hill (brother); Stanley Hill (brother); Les Hill (brother); Arthur Hill (brother); Percival Hill (brother); Wyndham Hill-Smith (nephew)

Domestic team information
- Years: Team
- 1903/04: South Australia
- Only FC: 12 March 1904 South Australia v MCC

Career statistics
Competition	First-class
Matches	1
Runs scored	10
Batting average	5.00
100s/50s	0/0
Top score	10
Balls bowled	154
Wickets	3
Bowling average	15.00
5 wickets in innings	0
10 wickets in match	0
Best bowling	3/27
Catches/stumpings	1/–
- Source: CricketArchive, 17 December 2008

Henry John Hill (7 July 1878 – 30 October 1906) was an Australian cricketer.

Hill was born in Adelaide, South Australia and was the brother of Australia captain Clem. He was a right-handed batsman and right-arm bowler of unknown style.

Hill played one first-class match for South Australia, a 1904 match against the strong touring England ("M.C.C.") team, making just 10 runs in his only innings, but taking 3 wickets for 45 runs, for an average of 15.00. He died in Kensington Park, Adelaide.
