= Arthur Hill (Australian cricketer) =

Australian cricketer

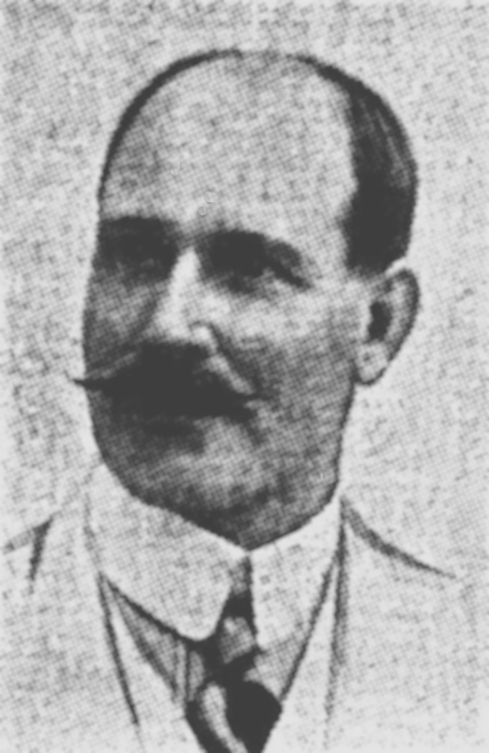

Personal information
- Full name: Arthur Hill
- Born: 28 May 1871; Adelaide, South Australia
- Died: 22 June 1936 (aged 65); Glenelg, South Australia
- Batting: Right-handed
- Role: Batsman
- Relatives: Clem Hill (brother); Stanley Hill (brother); Les Hill (brother); Henry Hill (brother); Percival Hill (brother); Wyndham Hill-Smith (nephew)

Domestic team information
- Years: Team
- 1889/90–1893/94: South Australia
- FC debut: 14 February 1890 South Australia v New South Wales
- Last FC: 6 January 1894 South Australia v New South Wales

Career statistics
Competition	First-class
Matches	5
Runs scored	121
Batting average	13.44
100s/50s	0/1
Top score	60
Catches/stumpings	0/–
- Source: CricketArchive, 24 January 2010

Arthur Hill (28 May 1871 – 22 June 1936) was a first-class cricketer.

A member of a Hill family that sported five cricketing brothers, including that of Australia captain Clem, Arthur Hill was a right-handed batsman. He played five first-class matches in four seasons for South Australia, scoring a total of 121 runs in his only innings.
