= Ernest Bailey =

Australian cricketer

Personal information
- Full name: Ernest Albert Bailey
- Born: 15 November 1881; Adelaide, South Australia
- Died: 16 August 1966 (aged 84); Northfield, South Australia
- Batting: Right-handed
- Role: Batsman
- Relatives: Bertram Bailey (brother)

Domestic team information
- Years: Team
- 1906/07: South Australia

Career statistics
Competition	First-class
Matches	1
Runs scored	23
Batting average	23.00
100s/50s	0/0
Top score	23*
Catches/stumpings	0/–
- Source: Cricinfo, 24 April 2018

Ernest Albert Bailey (15 November 1881 – 16 August 1966) was an Australian cricketer. He played one first-class match for South Australia during the 1906–07 season. Born at Adelaide in 1881, Bailey played club cricket for Adelaide Cricket Club. During his only senior match for the state side, a November 1906 Sheffield Shield fixture against Victoria, Bailey scored 23 not out in his first innings and was dismissed for a duck in his second.

Bailey died at Northfield, South Australia in 1966 aged 84. His brother, Bertram Bailey played eight matches for South Australia between 1896–97 and 1901–02.
