= Wyndham Hill-Smith =

Australian cricketer and winemaker

Personal information
- Born: 16 February 1909; Angaston, South Australia
- Died: 25 October 1990 (aged 81); Angaston, South Australia
- Batting: Left-handed
- Role: Batsman
- Relatives: Clem Hill (uncle); Stanley Hill (uncle); Les Hill (uncle); Arthur Hill (uncle); Henry Hill (uncle); Percival Hill (uncle)

Domestic team information
- Years: Team
- 1931/32–1933/34: Western Australia
- FC debut: 19 March 1932 Western Australia v South Africans
- Last FC: 26 March 1934 Western Australia v Australian XI

Career statistics
Competition	First-class
Matches	9
Runs scored	393
Batting average	28.07
100s/50s	0/4
Top score	68
Catches/stumpings	3/–
- Source: CricketArchive, 15 December 2008

Wyndham Hill-Smith OBE (16 February 1909 – 25 October 1990) was an Australian cricketer and wine-maker.

== Cricketer ==
The nephew of Australia Test captain Clem Hill, Hill-Smith was a left-handed batsman. He attended St Peter's College, Adelaide, playing in the college cricket team that toured Ceylon in January 1928.

He played eight first-class matches for Western Australia and one for a representative Australian XI. He made his first-class debut against the touring South Africans at the WACA Ground in 1932. Opening the batting, he made 56 runs before being dismissed by Xen Balaskas.

== Wine-maker ==
Following the death of his brother Sidney in the Kyeema aircraft crash in 1938, Hill-Smith returned to South Australia to take on the management of the family winery, Yalumba at Angaston. He led the company from 1938 to 1986. In 1980, Hill-Smith was appointed an Officer of the Order of the British Empire (OBE) for services to the wine industry and horse racing.

A grandstand at Cheltenham Park Racecourse in Adelaide was named the Wyndham Hill Smith Grandstand. His Wisden obituary concluded with the comment, "In later life he became famous for the liberal hospitality which he extended to touring teams at his Yalumba vineyard in South Australia."
