= Stanley Hill =

Australian cricketer

Personal information
- Born: 2 August 1885; Adelaide, South Australia
- Died: 10 May 1970 (aged 84); Englefield Green, Surrey, England
- Batting: Right-handed
- Role: Batsman
- Relatives: Clem Hill (brother); Les Hill (brother); Arthur Hill (brother); Henry Hill (brother); Percival Hill (brother); Wyndham Hill-Smith (nephew)

Domestic team information
- Years: Team
- 1909/10–1911/12: South Australia
- 1912/13: New South Wales
- FC debut: 13 November 1909 South Australia v Victoria
- Last FC: 8 November 1912 New South Wales v Western Australia

Career statistics
| Competition | First-class |
|---|---|
| Matches | 12 |
| Runs scored | 372 |
| Batting average | 16.90 |
| 100s/50s | 0/2 |
| Top score | 62 |
| Catches/stumpings | 3/– |
- Source: CricketArchive, 15 December 2008

Stanley Hill (22 August 1885 – 10 May 1970) was an Australian cricketer who played for South Australia and New South Wales. A right-handed batsman, he made his first-class debut for South Australia in 1909 against Victoria, playing 11 matches before making his final first-class appearance, for New South Wales, in 1912.

Hill scored two half-centuries in 22 first-class innings; his highest score of 62 was for South Australia against New South Wales in 1910.

== Early life ==
Hill was born in 1885 in Adelaide, South Australia, to Henry John Hill (known as John) and his wife Rebecca, née Saunders. Hill was one of eight sons and eight daughters in a family that was heavily involved in cricket. His father scored a century (102 not out) for North Adelaide against the touring Kent County Cricket Club, reportedly the first century scored at the Adelaide Oval. The third son, Clem, played 49 Tests for Australia. Five other brothers played for South Australia and in 1912–1913 there were several instances of three Hill brothers in the same representative team.
