= Percival Hill =

Australian cricketer

Personal information
- Born: 4 July 1868; Kent Town, South Australia
- Died: 24 July 1950 (aged 82); Adelaide, South Australia
- Batting: Right-handed
- Role: Batsman
- Relatives: Clem Hill (brother); Stanley Hill (brother); Les Hill (brother); Arthur Hill (brother); Henry Hill (brother); Wyndham Hill-Smith (nephew)

Domestic team information
- Years: Team
- 1892/93: South Australia
- Only FC: 27 March 1893 South Australia v Western Australia

Career statistics
Competition	First-class
Matches	1
Runs scored	2
Batting average	2.00
100s/50s	0/0
Top score	2
Catches/stumpings	0/–
- Source: CricketArchive, 18 December 2008

Percival Hill (born 4 July 1868 – 24 July 1950) was a cricketer.

The brother of Australia captain Clem, Percival Hill was a right-handed batsman. He played one first-class match for South Australia, making just two runs in his only innings.
