= 1900 SAFA season =

1900 SAFA premiership season
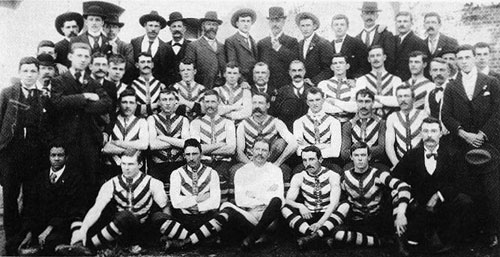
- 24th SAFA season Pictured above is the 1900 North Adelaide premiership team
- Teams: 6
- Premiers: North Adelaide; 1st premiership
- Minor premiers: North Adelaide; 1st minor premiership
- Leading goalkicker: Not awarded
- Matches played: 45
- Highest: 7,000 (Grand Final, North Adelaide vs. South Adelaide)

The 1900 South Australian Football Association season was the 24th season of the top-level Australian rules football competition in South Australia.

The North Adelaide Football Club won their first premiership and Port Adelaide collected their third and last wooden spoon as a senior SANFL club, until the AFL reserves team in 2024

== Minor rounds ==
The minor rounds comprised twelve matches. North Adelaide finished as the minor premiers, one win ahead of West Torrens.

1900 SAFA Ladder
Pos	Team	Pld	W	L	D	PF	PA	PP	Pts
1	North Adelaide (P)	12	9	2	1	584	355	62.19	19
2	West Torrens	12	8	3	1	443	389	53.25	17
3	South Adelaide	12	7	5	0	432	435	49.83	14
4	Norwood	12	6	6	0	505	473	51.64	12
5	West Adelaide	12	3	9	0	428	578	42.54	6
6	Port Adelaide	12	2	10	0	335	497	40.26	4

Rules for classification: 1) points; 2) percentage; 3) number of points for.
(P) Premiers

== Major rounds ==
For the second time, the major premiership was contested under the same system which had been adopted by the Victorian Football League in 1898, except adapted for six teams instead of eight. The six teams were broken into two sections: section A comprised North Adelaide (1st), South Adelaide (3rd) and West Adelaide (5th); section B comprised West Torrens (2nd), Norwood (4th) and Port Adelaide (6th). Each section played an individual round-robin; then, the section winners played off in a final. The minor premiers, North Adelaide, would then have the right to challenge the winner of the final to a grand final for the major premiership.

=== Sectional matches ===
	Sectional matches – Section A
Saturday, 11 August	North Adelaide 5.8 (38)	def.	West Adelaide 2.5 (17)	Adelaide Oval
Saturday, 18 August	South Adelaide 10.12 (72)	def.	West Adelaide 6.7 (43)	Jubilee Oval
Saturday, 25 August	South Adelaide 2.12 (24)	def.	North Adelaide 3.4 (22)	Adelaide Oval

	Sectional matches – Section B
Saturday, 18 August	Norwood 3.4 (22)	def.	Port Adelaide 3.2 (20)	Adelaide Oval
Saturday, 25 August	Port Adelaide 2.9 (21)	def. by	West Torrens 8.3 (51)	Alberton Oval
Saturday, 1 September	Norwood 4.1 (25)	def.	West Torrens 1.11 (17)	Adelaide Oval
Norwood defeated West Torrens on 1 September, despite being held scoreless in the first, third and final quarters of the game.

1900 Section A Ladder
Pos	Team	Pld	W	L	D	PF	PA	PP	Pts
1	South Adelaide	2	2	0	0	96	65	59.63	4
2	North Adelaide	2	1	1	0	60	41	59.41	2
3	West Adelaide	2	0	2	0	60	110	35.29	0

Rules for classification: 1) points; 2) percentage; 3) number of points for.

1900 Section B Ladder
Pos	Team	Pld	W	L	D	PF	PA	PP	Pts
1	Norwood	2	2	0	0	47	37	55.95	4
2	West Torrens	2	1	1	0	68	46	59.65	2
3	Port Adelaide	2	0	2	0	41	73	35.96	0

Rules for classification: 1) points; 2) percentage; 3) number of points for.

=== Finals ===
	1900 SAFA Preliminary Final
Monday, 3 September	South Adelaide 3.10 (28)	def.	Norwood 1.8 (14)	Adelaide Oval

1900 SAFA Grand Final
Saturday, 8 September	North Adelaide	def.	South Adelaide	Adelaide Oval (crowd: 7,000)
1.0 (6); 1.1 (7); 1.2 (8); 4.3 (27)	Q1; Q2; Q3; Final	0.2 (2); 0.3 (3); 0.5 (5); 1.8 (14)
McNamara 2, Matthews, Shaw	Goals	Kruss
