= Les Hill (cricketer) =

Australian cricketer

Personal information
- Full name: Leslie Roy Hill
- Born: 27 April 1884; Adelaide, South Australia
- Died: 15 December 1952 (aged 68); Adelaide, South Australia
- Batting: Right-handed
- Bowling: Right-arm fast-medium
- Relatives: Clem Hill (brother); Stanley Hill (brother); Arthur Hill (brother); Henry Hill (brother); Percival Hill (brother); Wyndham Hill-Smith (nephew)

Domestic team information
- Years: Team
- 1905/06–1910/11: South Australia
- FC debut: 11 November 1905 South Australia v Victoria
- Last FC: 10 March 1911 South Australia v South Africans

Career statistics
Competition	First-class
Matches	18
Runs scored	583
Batting average	18.21
100s/50s	1/3
Top score	123
Balls bowled	2,562
Wickets	28
Bowling average	47.14
5 wickets in innings	1
10 wickets in match	0
Best bowling	5/82
Catches/stumpings	8/–
- Source: CricketArchive, 16 December 2009

Leslie Roy Hill (27 April 1884 – 15 December 1952) was an Australian first-class cricketer. A right-handed batsman and right-arm fast-medium bowler, he made eighteen appearances for South Australia. He made his top-score of 123 against New South Wales in his penultimate first-class match.

Hill also played Australian rules football for Norwood in the South Australian Football League and was a member of their 1904 and 1907 premiership teams.
