= 1902 World Allround Speed Skating Championships =

International speed skating competition

World Allround Speed Skating Championships
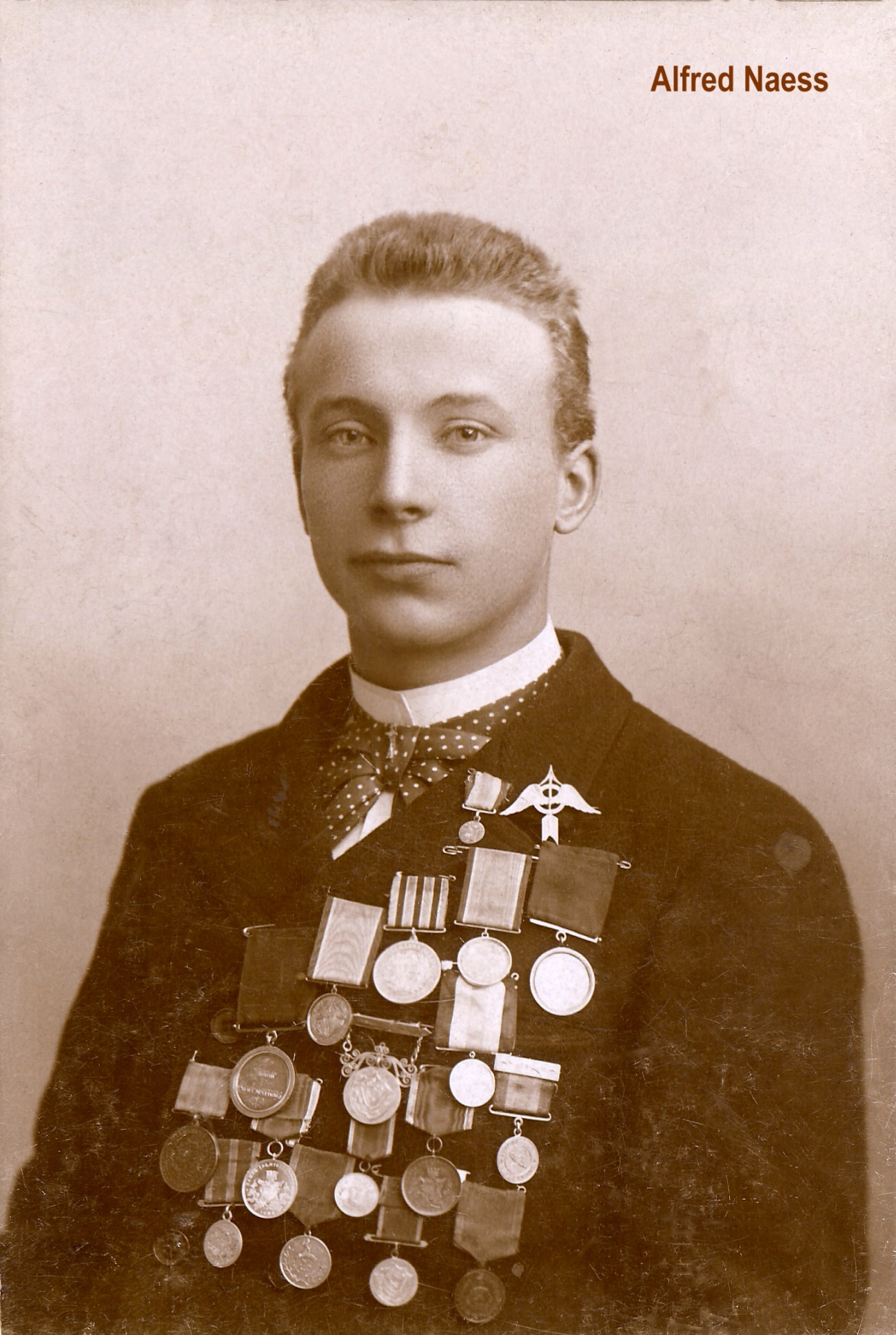
- Alfred Naess; Participated in the 1902 World Championship
- Venue: Pohjoissatama, Helsinki, Finland
- Dates: 22–23 February
- Competitors: 11 from 4 nations

Medalist men
1st place, gold medalist(s)		None declared

The 1902 World Allround Speed Skating Championships took place between 22 and 23 February 1902 at the Pohjoissatama ice rink in Helsinki, Finland.

Franz Wathén was the defending champion. No one won at least three distances and so no World champion was declared.

== Allround results ==
Place	Athlete	Country	500m	5000m	1500m	10000m
NC1	Rudolf Gundersen	Norway	47.0 (1)	9:32.0 (3)	2:34.4 (1)	20:19.6 (5)
NC2	Jussi Wiinikainen	Finland	49.8 (3)	9:20.6 (1)	2:40.4 (5)	19:09.4 (1)
NC3	Johan Schwartz	Norway	50.0 (4)	9:21.4 (2)	2:37.0 (2)	19:35.8 (3)
NC4	Sigurd Mathisen	Norway	52.6 (8)	9:38.6 (6)	2:43.0 (7)	19:13.0 (2)
NC5	Franz Schilling	Austria	54.0 (10)	9:35.8 (5)	2:43.0 (7)	20:05.6 (4)
NC	Franz Wathén	Finland	49.6 (2)	9:32.0 (3)	2:39.8 (4)	NF
NC	Toivo Tillander	Finland	50.6 (5)	9:51.4 (7)	2:39.0 (3)	NS
NC	Walter Johansson	Finland	51.6 (6)	10:10.6 (8)	2:42.2 (6)	NS
NC	Arvid Andersson	Finland	52.2 (7)	10:27.4 (10)	2:46.8 (10)	NS
NC	Uno Eklund	Finland	52.8 (9)	10:22.6 (9)	2:44.6 (9)	NS
NC	Theodor Baltscheffski	Finland	54.8 (11)	NS	NS	NS

* = Fell
NC = Not classified
NF = Not finished
NS = Not started
DQ = Disqualified

Source: SpeedSkatingStats.com

== Rules ==
Four distances have to be skated:

- 500m
- 1500m
- 5000m
- 10000m

One could only win the World Championships by winning at least three of the four distances, so there would be no World Champion if no skater won at least three distances.

Silver and bronze medals were not awarded.
