= Charles Ross (Australian cricketer) =

Australian cricketer

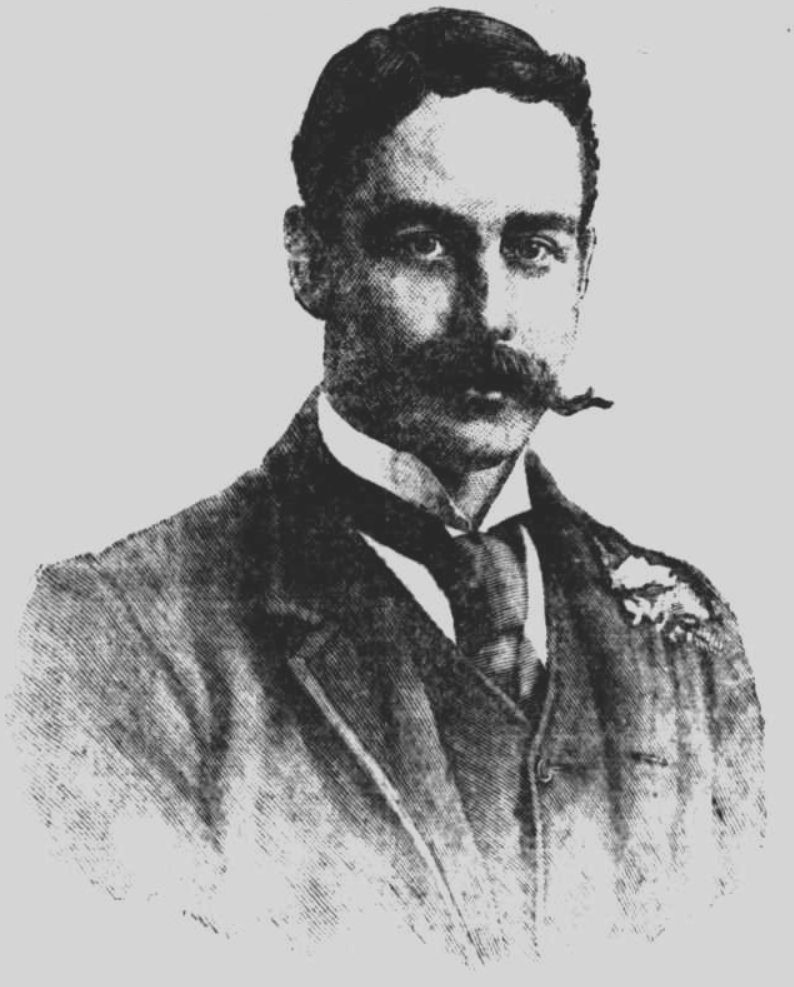

Personal information
- Born: 10 May 1863; Melbourne, Australia
- Died: 5 February 1935 (aged 71); Sydney, Australia

Domestic team information
- Years: Team
- 1886-1901: Victoria
- Source: Cricinfo, 25 July 2015

Charles Howard Ross (10 May 1863 – 5 February 1935) was an Australian cricketer. He played 15 first-class cricket matches for Victoria between 1886 and 1901. He also played for Melbourne Cricket Club.

== See also ==
- List of Victoria first-class cricketers
