= Mathew Ellis =

Australian cricketer

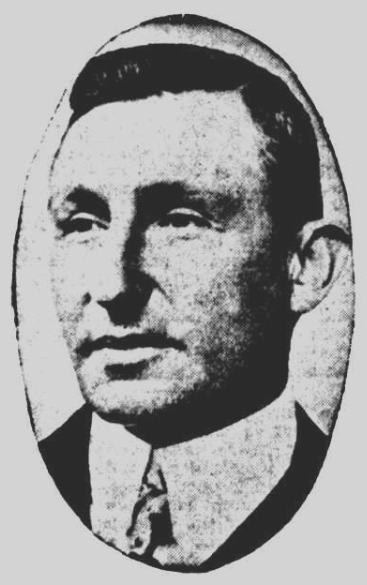

Personal information
- Born: 3 February 1870; Melbourne, Australia
- Died: 19 November 1940 (aged 70); Melbourne, Australia

Domestic team information
- Years: Team
- 1901-1907: Victoria

Career statistics
Competition	First-class
Matches	13
Runs scored	521
Batting average	21.70
100s/50s	1/2
Top score	118
Balls bowled	-
Wickets	10
Bowling average	35.40
5 wickets in innings	0
10 wickets in match	0
Best bowling	2/21
Catches/stumpings	5/0
- Source: Cricinfo, 9 July 2020

Mathew Ellis (3 February 1870 – 19 November 1940) was an Australian cricketer. He played thirteen first-class cricket matches for Victoria between 1901 and 1907. He was an all-rounder.

Ellis began his district cricket career in the 1892–93 season when he was recruited for the Carlton senior side from the junior ranks in December, 1892. He was then a regular in the senior side but in January, 1894, he was dropped to the Carlton seconds, and by 1896 he had moved to Fitzroy where he remained for the rest of his district career.

In 1903 Ellis helped set the Victorian record for tenth wicket partnership when he was involved in a stand for 211 runs in a match against South Australia. He was involved in cricket administration during and after his playing career, serving as a delegate for Fitzroy to the Victorian Cricket Association from 1904 to 1931. He was also a selector for the Victorian side in the mid-1920s, and in 1926 he caused controversy when he harshly criticized the national selectors for omitting Charlie Kelleway and refused to retract his comments.

Outside of cricket he was a racehorse owner and his successes included his horse Kerlie winning the Williamstown Cup in 1909, his horse Sheriff Muir winning the V.R.C. Sires' Produce Stakes race at 50 to 1 odds, and his horse Miss Disraeli winning the Oaks race.

In 1940 Ellis suffered a fractured leg after falling in a street near his home and he died due to a heart seizure while in St. Vincent's Hospital.

== See also ==
- List of Victoria first-class cricketers
