= John Fitzpatrick (cricketer) =

Australian cricketer

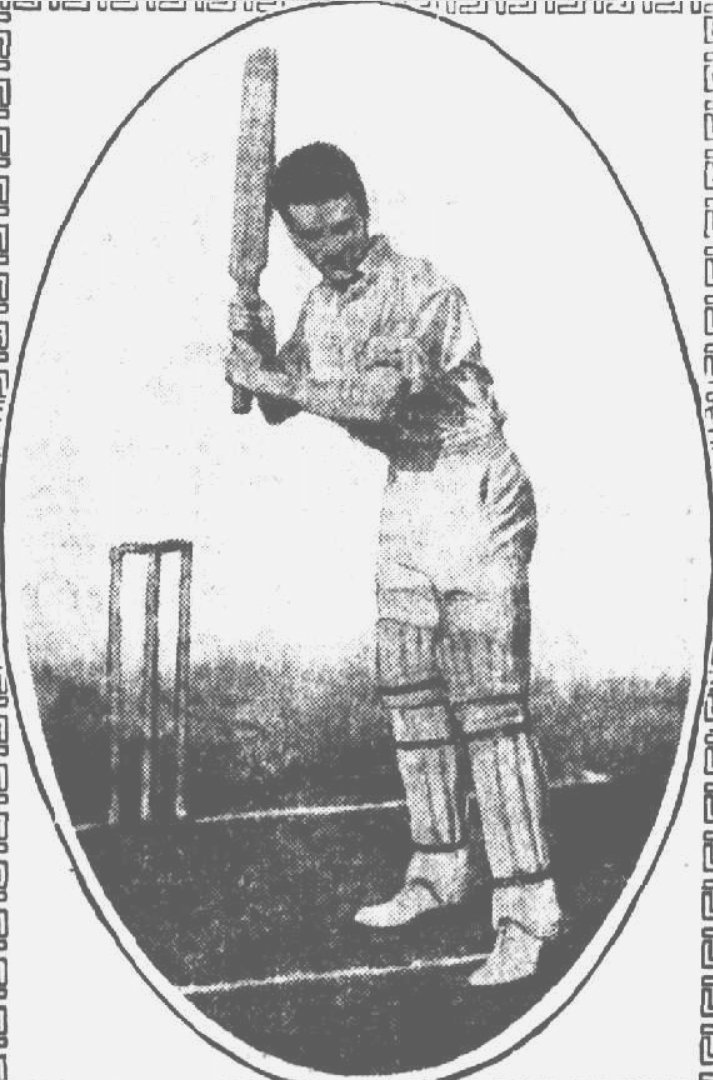

Personal information
- Born: 26 June 1889; Sydney, Australia
- Died: 16 August 1952 (aged 63); Coogee, New South Wales, Australia

Domestic team information
- Years: Team
- 1914: Victoria
- Source: Cricinfo, 18 November 2015

John Fitzpatrick (26 June 1889 – 16 August 1952) was an Australian cricketer. He played one first-class cricket match for Victoria in 1914.

== See also ==
- List of Victoria first-class cricketers
