= Donald Steele =

Australian cricketer

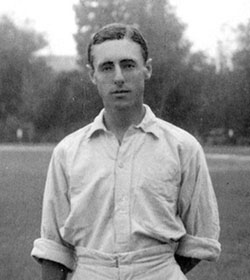

Personal information
- Full name: Donald Macdonald Steele
- Born: 17 August 1892; Adelaide, South Australia
- Died: 13 July 1962 (aged 69); Adelaide
- Batting: Right-handed

Domestic team information
- Years: Team
- 1911-12 to 1920-21: South Australia

Career statistics
Competition	First-class
Matches	19
Runs scored	1142
Batting average	35.68
100s/50s	3/7
Top score	113*
Balls bowled	–
Wickets	–
Bowling average	–
5 wickets in innings	–
10 wickets in match	–
Best bowling	–
Catches/stumpings	11/0
- Source: Cricinfo, 24 April 2017

Donald Macdonald Steele (17 August 1892 – 13 July 1962) was a cricketer who played first-class cricket for South Australia from 1912 to 1921. He was later a prominent doctor in South Australia.

== Family and early life ==
Don Steele was one of six brothers. His elder brothers David Macdonald Steele and Ken Steele were doctors who served as medical officers in the field in World War I. Ken also played first-class cricket for South Australia before the war.

Don attended Prince Alfred College, Adelaide, where he played in the First XI for six years from 1907 to 1912, captaining the team in the last three years. He then studied medicine at the University of Adelaide, qualifying as a doctor at the end of 1919.

== Cricket career ==
Steele played his first game for South Australia in January 1912 while still at school. He became a regular player in the state team in 1912-13 and remained a fixture in the side until the end of the 1920-21 season, studies and professional duties permitting.

In his first match in the 1912-13 season he scored 113 not out in 175 minutes against New South Wales in an innings victory for South Australia. He scored his second century in 1914-15 when he made 100 in 135 minutes, also against New South Wales.

He captained South Australia in the last three matches of the 1920-21 Sheffield Shield season, scoring 107 not out in the first match, against Victoria. He finished the season at the top of the South Australian batting averages, with 280 runs at 56.00.

He was selected to captain the Australian team to tour New Zealand at the end of the season. However, he was unable to go on the tour, having made arrangements to work as a locum in Port Lincoln. His professional duties prevented him from playing any further first-class cricket.

== Later life ==
He practised as a doctor in Port Lincoln for some years before returning to practise in Adelaide, where he and his wife lived in Glenelg.

While watching a Test match at Adelaide Oval in 1925 he was called on to treat the English spin bowler Tich Freeman, who had broken his wrist while attempting a catch. Steele put the wrist in splints then took Freeman to hospital.

His son Ian was also a doctor.
