= James Matthews (footballer) =

Australian rules footballer and cricketer

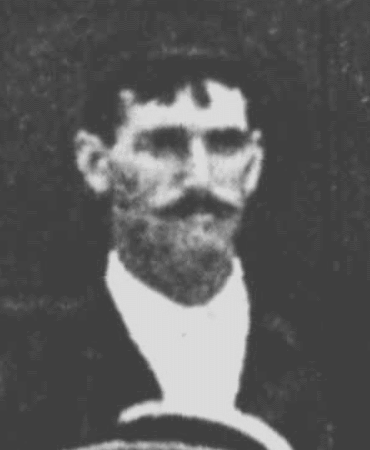

Personal information
- Full name: James George Facey Matthews
- Nickname: Jimmy
- Born: 27 September 1876; Lyndoch, South Australia
- Died: 8 October 1963 (aged 87); Prospect, South Australia

Playing career
Years	Club	Games (Goals)
1896–1909	North Adelaide	

Career highlights
- North Adelaide premiership player (1900, 1902 & 1905); South Australian interstate representative

James George Facey Matthews (27 September 1876 – 8 October 1963) was an Australian sportsman who played Australian rules football for North Adelaide in the South Australian Football Association (SAFA) and, as a cricketer, played seven Sheffield Shield matches for South Australia.

Matthews was a member of North Adelaide's first three premiership sides, in 1900, 1902 and 1905. He started his career as a forward and topped the club's goalkicking in his debut season before moving into the centre later in his career. Matthews finished his career as a fullback and twice represented South Australia at interstate football. In 1906 he captained North Adelaide, who finished second.
