= Frank Foster (cricketer) =

English cricketer (1889–1958)

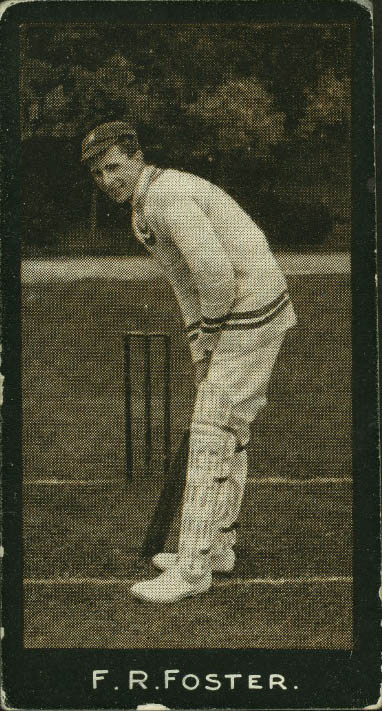
- Foster takes guard (c. 1912)

Personal information
- Born: 31 January 1889; Birmingham, England
- Died: 3 May 1958 (aged 69); Northampton, England
- Batting: Right-handed
- Bowling: Left-arm fast-medium

International information
- National side: England
- Test debut: 15–19 December 1911 v Australia
- Last Test: 19–22 August 1912 v Australia

Career statistics
Competition	Test	First-class
Matches	11	159
Runs scored	330	6,548
Batting average	23.57	26.61
100s/50s	0/3	7/35
Top score	71	305*
Balls bowled	2,447	33,291
Wickets	45	717
Bowling average	20.57	20.75
5 wickets in innings	4	53
10 wickets in match	0	8
Best bowling	6/91	9/118
Catches/stumpings	11/–	121/–
- Source: Wisden, 16 September 2022

Frank Rowbotham Foster (31 January 1889 – 3 May 1958) was an English amateur cricketer who played for Warwickshire County Cricket Club from 1908 to 1914, and in Test cricket for England in 1911 and 1912. As captain of Warwickshire he led the county to their first championship in 1911. He was born in Birmingham, educated at Solihull School and died in St Andrew's Hospital in Northampton. His career was cut short after a motor-cycle accident during World War I.

Foster was an all-rounder. As a right-handed batsman, he scored 6,548 career runs in 159 first-class matches at an average of 26.61 runs per completed innings with a highest score of 305* as one of seven centuries. He was a left-arm fast medium bowler and took 717 first-class wickets with a best return of 9/118. He took five wickets in an innings 53 times and ten wickets in a match 8 times with a best return of 12/92. As a fielder, Foster completed 121 catches.

Foster opened the bowling in the 1911-1912 Ashes with Sydney Barnes. Together they took 66 wickets helping England win the series 4-1. Foster finished the series as second top wicket taker with 32 wickets at an average of 21.62 and scored 226 runs.

After his retirement from cricket, he was contacted by Douglas Jardine regarding his successful use of leg theory bowling in the 1911-1912 Ashes. A variation of this tactic was used against Donald Bradman as the Bodyline tactic in the 1932-1933 Ashes.

Of unstable personality, he was employed in his family menswear firm of Foster Brothers until it dismissed him by 1928. He was later implicated in the murder of a London prostitute in 1931, but was never charged with another person subsequently being tried for the murder. He became bankrupt through heavy gambling, was prosecuted for thefts and fraud, and died in a psychiatric hospital where he had been committed in 1950.
