= Louis N. James =

American golfer

Personal information
- Nationality: United States
- Born: September 1883 Chicago, Illinois, U.S.
- Died: June 7, 1935 (aged 51) Chicago, Illinois, U.S.

Career
- Sport: Golf
- Status: Amateur

Best results in major championships (wins: 1)
- PGA Championship: DNP
- The Open Championship: DNP
- U.S. Amateur: Win: 1902

Louis N. James (September 1882 – June 7, 1935) was an American amateur golfer.

== Career ==
James won the 1902 U.S. Amateur at Glen View Club, defeating Eben Byers in the final, 4 and 2. Heavy rain flooded part of the course, and the final four rounds, including the final, were played on the first nine, 36-hole matches requiring four circuits of the first nine. James, whose family lived on the grounds of Glen View, was the first teenager to win the U.S. Amateur, at age 19 years, 10 months.

James died on June 7, 1935, aged 51, in Chicago, Illinois.
