= 1902 Grand National =

English steeplechase horse race

- Grand National
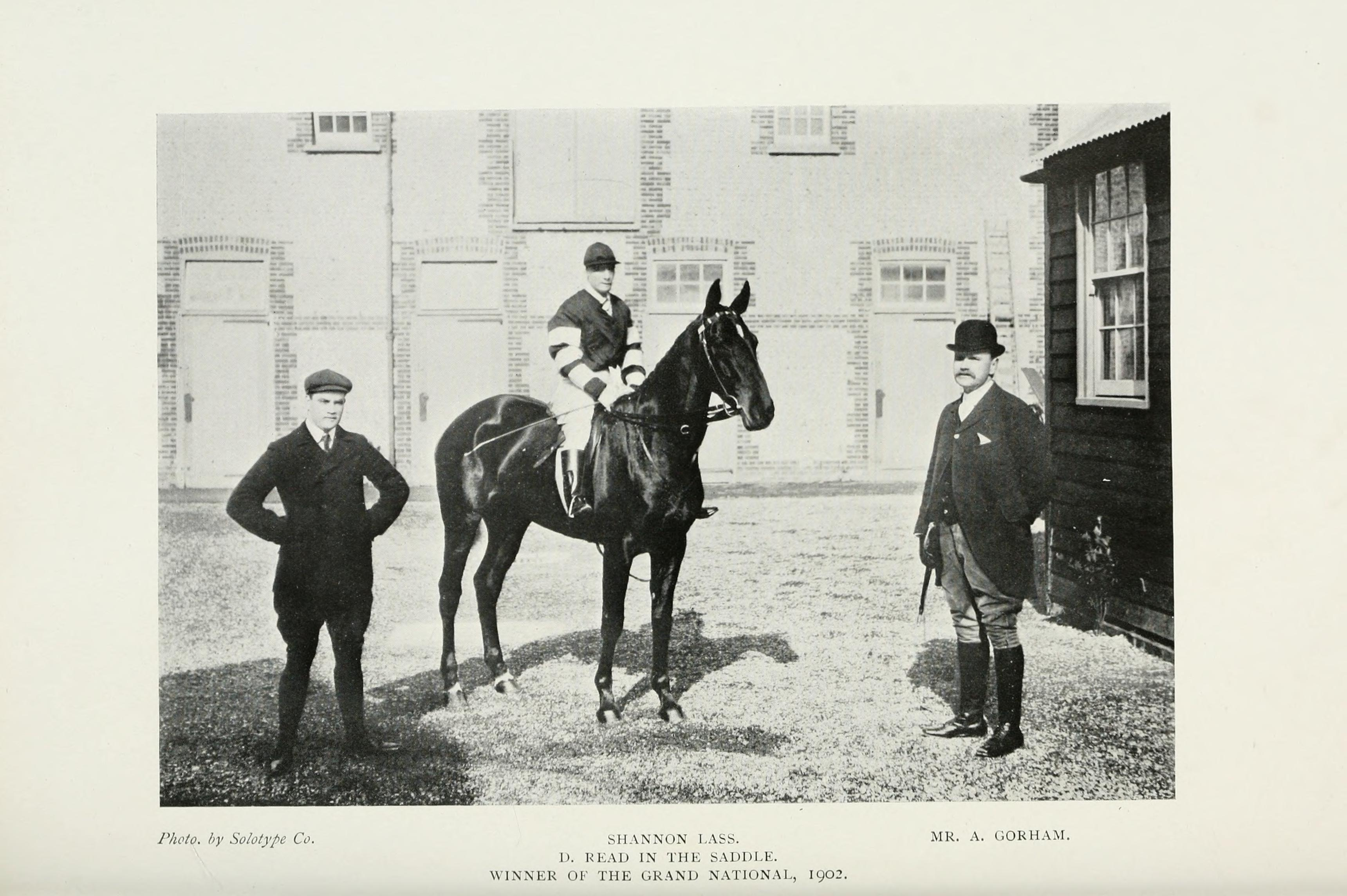
- Shannon Lass, D. Read & A. Gorham (from Heroes and heroines of the Grand National)
- Location: Aintree
- Date: 21 March 1902
- Winning horse: Shannon Lass
- Starting price: 20/1
- Jockey: David Read
- Trainer: James Hackett
- Owner: Ambrose Gorham
- Conditions: Good to soft

The 1902 Grand National was the 64th renewal of the Grand National horse race that took place at Aintree near Liverpool, England, on 21 March 1902.

== Finishing Order ==
| Position | Name | Jockey | Age | Handicap (st-lb) | SP | Distance |
|---|---|---|---|---|---|---|
| 01 | Shannon Lass | David Read | 7 | 10-1 | 20/1 | 3 lengths |
| 02 | Matthew | Willie Morgan | 6 | 9-12 | 50/1 | |
| 03 | Manifesto | A E Piggott | 14 | 12-8 | 100/6 | |
| 04 | Detail | Arthur Nightingall | ? | 9-9 | 25/1 | |
| 05 | Lurgan | R Freemantle | ? | 10-12 | 100/8 | |
| 06 | Tipperary Boy | T Moran | ? | 11-6 | 100/8 | |
| 07 | Drumcree | Mr Charles Nugent | ? | 10-10 | 10/1 | |
| 08 | Barsac | Frank Mason | ? | 9-12 | 7/1 | |
| 09 | The Sapper | H Brown | ? | 10-3 | 40/1 | |
| 10 | Miss Cliffden II | Mr Harry Ripley | ? | 9-7 | 50/1 | |
| 11 | Steady Glass | Mr Longworth | ? | 9-8 | 100/1 | Last to complete |

== Non-finishers ==
| Fence | Name | Jockey | Age | Handicap (st-lb) | SP | Fate |
|---|---|---|---|---|---|---|
| 04 | Drumree | Algy Anthony | ? | 11-4 | 6/1 | Knocked Over |
| 19 | Helium | Caley | ? | 10-10 | 50/1 | Refused |
| 25 | Inquisitor | Mr Arthur Wood | ? | ? | 6/1 | Fell |
| ? | Arnold | T H Bissill | ? | 10-1 | 33/1 | ? |
| 04 | Dirkhampton | Mr J Sharpe | ? | 10-0 | 50/1 | Fell |
| >19 | Aunt May | M Walsh | ? | 10-0 | 20/1 | ? |
| 19 | Whitehaven | Percy Woodland | ? | 9-13 | 20/1 | Pulled Up |
| 04 | Fairland | Ernest Acres | ? | 9-7 | 25/1 | Fell |
| 19 | Zodiac | Albert Banner | ? | 9-7 | 100/1 | Pulled Up |
| ? | Gossip | H Hewitt | ? | 9-7 | 100/1 | ? |
