= William McCormack (cricketer) =

Australian cricketer

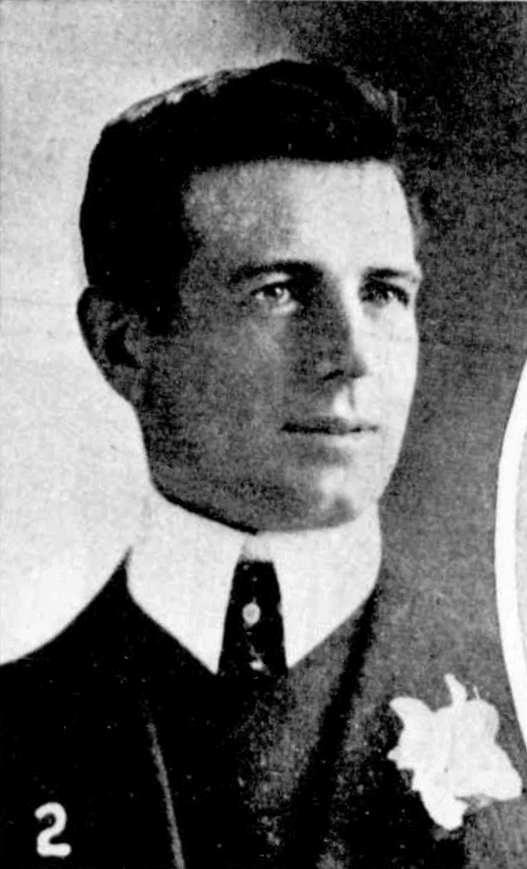

Personal information
- Born: 5 May 1877; Melbourne, Australia
- Died: 26 April 1946 (aged 68); Stawell, Victoria, Australia

Domestic team information
- Years: Team
- 1901-1902: Victoria
- Source: Cricinfo, 16 August 2015

William McCormack (5 May 1877 – 26 April 1946) was an Australian cricketer. He played two first-class cricket matches for Victoria between 1901 and 1902.

== See also ==
- List of Victoria first-class cricketers
