= Ernest Leak =

Australian cricketer

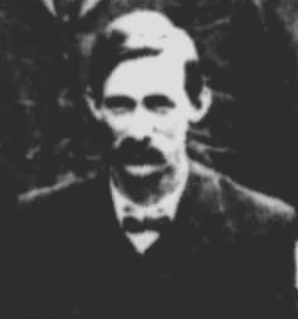

Personal information
- Born: 28 October 1872; Rapid Bay, South Australia
- Died: 22 August 1945 (aged 72); Adelaide, Australia
- Source: Cricinfo, 12 August 2020

Ernest Leak (28 October 1872 – 22 August 1945) was an Australian cricketer. He played in twelve first-class matches for South Australia between 1895 and 1910.

== See also ==
- List of South Australian representative cricketers
