= David Mailer =

Australian cricketer

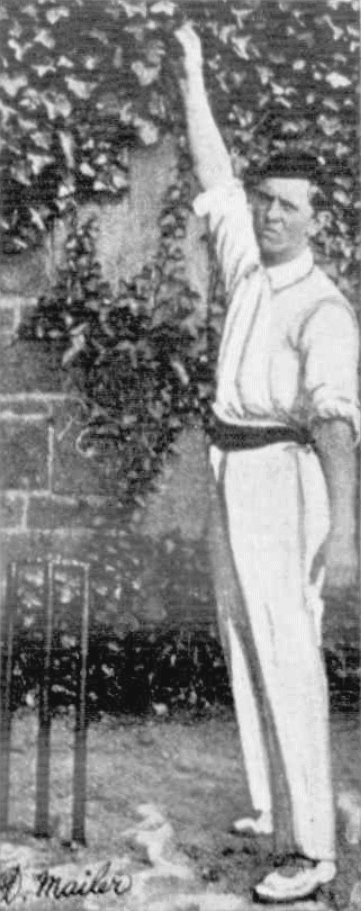

Personal information
- Born: 18 August 1874; Melbourne, Australia
- Died: 21 December 1937 (aged 63); Shepparton, Australia

Domestic team information
- Years: Team
- 1899–1903: Victoria
- Source: Cricinfo, 27 July 2015

David Mailer (18 August 1874 – 21 December 1937) was an Australian cricketer. He played five first-class cricket matches for Victoria between 1899 and 1903.

At club level, Mailer played for Melbourne and Coburg.

In 1903, the Referee reported Mailer would stop playing Victorian cricket because he was moving to Roma, Queensland.

Mailer was a grazier in later life.

== See also ==
- List of Victoria first-class cricketers
