= Bertram Bailey =

Australian cricketer

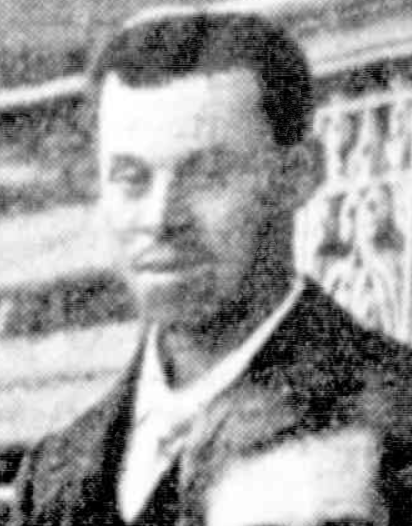

Personal information
- Full name: Bertram Theodore Bailey
- Born: 5 December 1874; Adelaide, South Australia
- Died: 13 October 1964 (aged 89); Payneham, South Australia
- Batting: Right-handed
- Bowling: Right-arm leg break
- Relatives: Ernest Bailey (brother)

Domestic team information
- Years: Team
- 1896/97–1901/02: South Australia

Career statistics
| Competition | First-class |
|---|---|
| Matches | 8 |
| Runs scored | 247 |
| Batting average | 16.46 |
| 100s/50s | 0/1 |
| Top score | 57 |
| Balls bowled | 66 |
| Wickets | 1 |
| Bowling average | 45.00 |
| 5 wickets in innings | 0 |
| 10 wickets in match | 0 |
| Best bowling | 1/23 |
| Catches/stumpings | 5/– |
- Source: Cricinfo, 24 April 2018

Bertram Theodore Bailey (5 December 1874 – 13 October 1964) was an Australian cricketer. He played eight first-class matches for South Australia between 1896–97 and 1901–02.
