= Jack Massie =

Australian cricketer and rugby union player

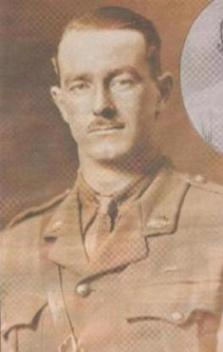

Personal information
- Full name: Robert John Allwright Massie
- Born: 8 July 1890; North Sydney, Australia
- Died: 14 February 1966 (aged 75); Mosman, Australia
- Batting: Left-handed
- Bowling: Left-arm fast-medium
- Role: Bowler

Domestic team information
- Years: Team
- 1910/11–1913/14: New South Wales

Career statistics
Competition	First-class
Matches	16
Runs scored	199
Batting average	10.47
100s/50s	0/1
Top score	50*
Balls bowled	3,888
Wickets	99
Bowling average	18.42
5 wickets in innings	7
10 wickets in match	4
Best bowling	7/110
Catches/stumpings	15/–
- Source: CricketArchive, 8 October 2022

Robert John Allwright Massie DSO (8 July 1890 – 14 February 1966) was an Australian first-class cricketer who played with New South Wales and represented them in the Sheffield Shield.

Massie also served in World War I as an officer in the Australian Imperial Force, seeing action at Gallipoli and on the Western Front in France. Injuries sustained in the war ended his cricket career, but he had a successful business career, principally with British American Tobacco.

== Early sporting achievements ==
Massie was a gifted sportsman, representing New South Wales at numerous sports. As a rugby union footballer he played in the position of second-rower for Sydney University while studying Civil Engineering and represented New South Wales four times. He was picked in the Australian rugby squad to tour New Zealand in 1913 but had to withdraw due to study commitments.

In 1913 he won the NSW Amateur Boxing Heavy Weight Championship and the following year was state champion in the 120-yard hurdles. He also excelled at rifle-shooting and rowing.

== First-class cricketer ==
A tall left-arm fast bowler, Massie came close to playing Test cricket in 1914 when he was named in the squad to tour South Africa but the series did not go ahead. He had been playing regular first-class cricket for just two seasons but had proved to be a handful for Australian batsmen, taking 59 wickets at 18.66 in the 1912–13 summer and then 37 wickets at 16.32 in 1913–14.

Massie's best performance in a match came in a Sheffield Shield encounter in 1912/13, with New South Wales taking on Victoria. His second innings figures of 7 for 110 gave him 11 wickets for the match and included the scalps of Warwick Armstrong and Jack Ryder.

He was generally an ineffective batsman but did manage a half century against Western Australia in 1912 at the Sydney Cricket Ground. New South Wales declared their second innings at 8/375 once he reached the milestone and went on to win the match.

== World War I campaign ==
Massie, who enlisted in the Australian Imperial Force on 17 August 1914, was commissioned as a second lieutenant in the 4th Battalion on 14 September, served with distinction during the war. His battalion embarked for Egypt in October, and he was promoted lieutenant on 1 February 1915. He took part in Australia's campaign at Gallipoli and in just his second day in the conflict was fortunate to survive a suicidal advance towards the Turkish lines, resulting from orders that were misunderstood by his battalion, when his commanding officer was killed, Massie tried to recover his body. While fighting at Gallipoli he wore a scarlet rag on his right arm so that if he was shot by the Turkish marksmen it would likely be to the arm that stood out and not his left arm which he used for bowling.

Massie received slight wounds on 25 June, and 20 July, he was seriously injured on the night of 6–7 August 1915, during the Battle of Lone Pine by shrapnel. The cricketer had been sent by a junior officer to investigate an outpost which was under fire, and was struck by an exploding shell. The shrapnel lodged into the back of his left shoulder and he also suffered a punctured lung and broken ribs. The injury was serious enough for him to be repatriated to Australia, he was promoted to captain during the journey, on 1 December.

Massie was Mentioned in Despatches on 28 January 1916 for his service in the Dardanelles, and awarded the French Croix de Guerre. He was promoted major on 1 May, and appointed second in command of the newly raised 33rd Battalion, which he had previously been involved in training. The battalion departed Sydney on the transport Marathon on 4 May, and arrived at Devonport on 9 July. The battalion was sent to France with the 3rd Division on 21 November.

Massie was Mentioned in Despatches a second time on 1 June 1917, for his actions prior to 9 April 1917. He was attached to the divisional HQ during May and June 1917. On a brief period of leave in England in August, and despite his previous injuries, he played in a cricket match at Lord's on a combined Australian and South African services side against a combined British Army and Navy side. The "Colonials" (as a report in The Times referred to them) won convincingly, with Massie taking 2/31. From October to December he was a student on a higher command course. Returning to France, he was again severely wounded on 3 February 1918, a training exercise behind the lines being interrupted by a solitary German bomb, the resulting shrapnel badly damaging his right foot. He received a further Mention in Despatches for his actions prior to 7 April 1918, this was gazetted on 28 May 1918, and he then received the Distinguished Service Order on 3 June 1918.

After Massie's initial recuperation he trained with the Machine Gun Corps at Grantham, passing the tests to command a machine gun battalion. He was attached to the Australian Corps School on 12 September, appointed commandant on 24 September, and promoted to lieutenant colonel on 21 October. He was demobilised on 16 August 1919. His combined injuries meant he never played competitive cricket again.

== Business career ==
Before the war Massie had been employed by British American Tobacco and returned to work with them in 1919. During the 1930s and 1940s he was Chairman of Directors for British American Tobacco's operations in Australia and also at W.D. & H.O. Wills while also serving as Director of the Commercial Banking Company. He also worked at the Ministry of Munitions to help out in World War II. From 1946 to 1951 he served as the Deputy Chairman of the British American Tobacco in London before retiring.

== Personal life ==
Massie's father Hugh had also been a cricketer and appeared in nine Tests for Australia in the 1880s. Massie's grandfather, on his mother's side, Thomas Allwright Dibbs, was an eminent banker in Sydney.

Massie married Phyllis Wood Lang at Holy Trinity Brompton, London, on 3 June 1919. They had a son named John who was killed in action during World War II; Phyllis died soon after. On 20 September 1947, Massie married a widow, Elizabeth Emily Squire (née Crosse) in Washington DC.

He died on 14 February 1966, at the age of 75, from cancer.
