= George Watson (umpire) =

Australian cricket umpire

George Albert Watson (died 9 February 1948) was a cricket Test match umpire.

He umpired two Test matches, making his debut in the match between Australia and South Africa, played at Adelaide on 7 January to 13 January 1911. This resulted in the first win by South Africa over Australia, in spite of Victor Trumper scoring 214 not out.

Watson's other match was between Australia and England, played at Adelaide on 12 January to 17 January 1912, won by England. In both matches Watson's colleague was Bob Crockett.

== See also ==
- Australian Test Cricket Umpires
- List of Test umpires
