= Frederick Collins (cricketer) =

Australian cricketer (1881–1917)

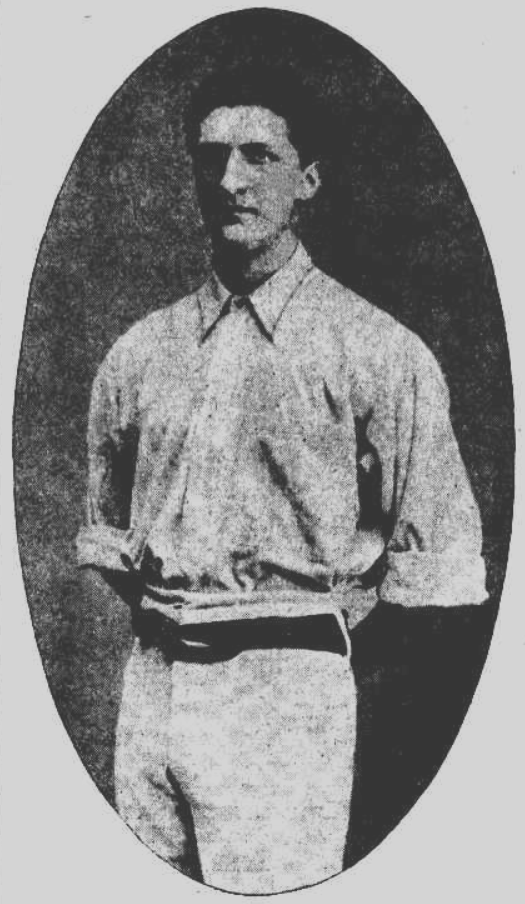

Personal information
- Full name: Frederick Bisset Collins
- Born: 25 February 1881; Melbourne, Australia
- Died: 4 October 1917 (aged 36); Broodseinde, Passchendaele salient, Belgium
- Height: 6 ft 1 in (1.85 m)
- Batting: Right-handed
- Bowling: Right-arm fast-medium
- Role: Bowler

Domestic team information
- Years: Team
- 1899/1900–1908/09: Victoria

Career statistics
Competition	First-class
Matches	37
Runs scored	390
Batting average	7.95
100s/50s	0/0
Top score	37*
Balls bowled	7,084
Wickets	146
Bowling average	26.10
5 wickets in innings	11
10 wickets in match	0
Best bowling	7/61
Catches/stumpings	36/–
- Source: Cricinfo, 26 January 2025

Frederick Bisset Collins (25 February 1881 – 4 October 1917) was an Australian cricketer. He played 37 first-class cricket matches for Victoria between 1899 and 1909. He was killed in action during World War I at Broodseinde.

Collins was educated at Scotch College, Melbourne, and had a long career with East Melbourne in senior Melbourne cricket, taking 422 wickets at an average of 13. A right-arm fast-medium bowler, he had his most successful season for Victoria in 1902–03 when he took 31 wickets at an average of 20.45, and also took his best first-class figures of 7 for 61 in Victoria's victory over Lord Hawke's XI.
