= Leslie Pye =

Australian cricketer

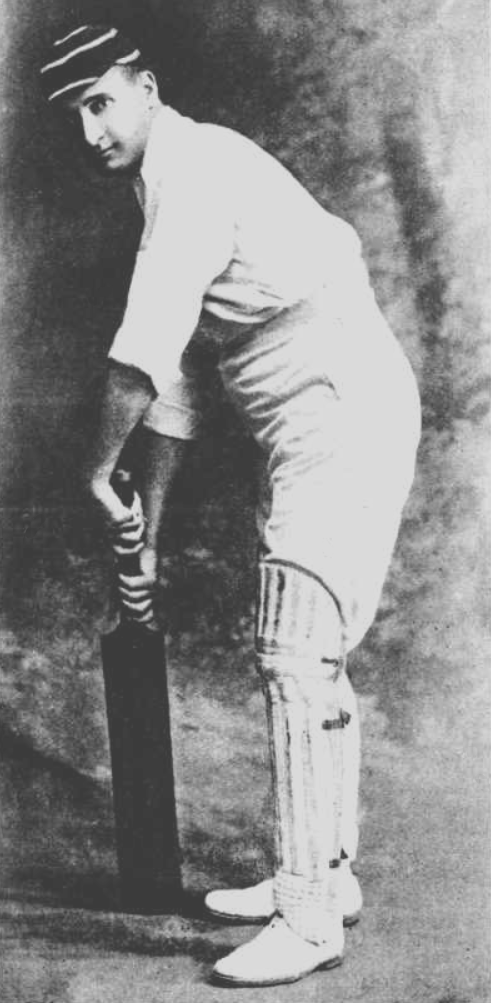

Personal information
- Born: 6 July 1871; Parramatta, Australia
- Died: 9 March 1949 (aged 77); Parramatta, Australia
- Source: ESPNcricinfo, 15 January 2017

Leslie Pye (6 July 1871 – 9 March 1949) was an Australian cricketer. He played 29 first-class matches for New South Wales between 1896/97 and 1905/06.

== See also ==
- List of New South Wales representative cricketers
