= William Curran (umpire) =

Australian cricket umpire

William Gregory Curran (1861/1862 – 23 December 1921 at Sydney) was an Australian Test cricket umpire.

Billy Curran umpired two Test matches, making his debut in the match between Australia and South Africa, the first match between these nations in Australia, played at the Sydney Cricket Ground in December 1910. Australia won by an innings after scoring 6 for 494 on the first day, the then highest number of runs by a Test side in a day. Curran's other Test match was between Australia and England, played at the Sydney Cricket Ground in December 1911. This was won by Australia with Victor Trumper scoring a record eighth Test century, and "Ranji'" Hordern taking 12 wickets.

Between 1903 and 1921, Curran umpired 32 first-class matches, all of them at the Sydney Cricket Ground. Johnnie Moyes, who played during his era, describes him as "little Billy Curran of Sydney, who, we thought, had a perfect horror of giving batsmen out leg-before-wicket". Only two leg-before decisions were given in his two Test matches – perhaps both were given by Bob Crockett, Curran's colleague on both occasions! Curran had a reputation for fearlessness and impartiality in his umpiring.

Curran married 24-year-old Ann Florence Giles in Sydney in December 1910. He died at home in the Sydney suburb of Waverley in December 1921 after a long illness, aged 59, survived by his wife and their six young children.

== See also ==
- Australian Test Cricket Umpires
- List of Test umpires
