= Harold Kirkwood =

Australian cricketer

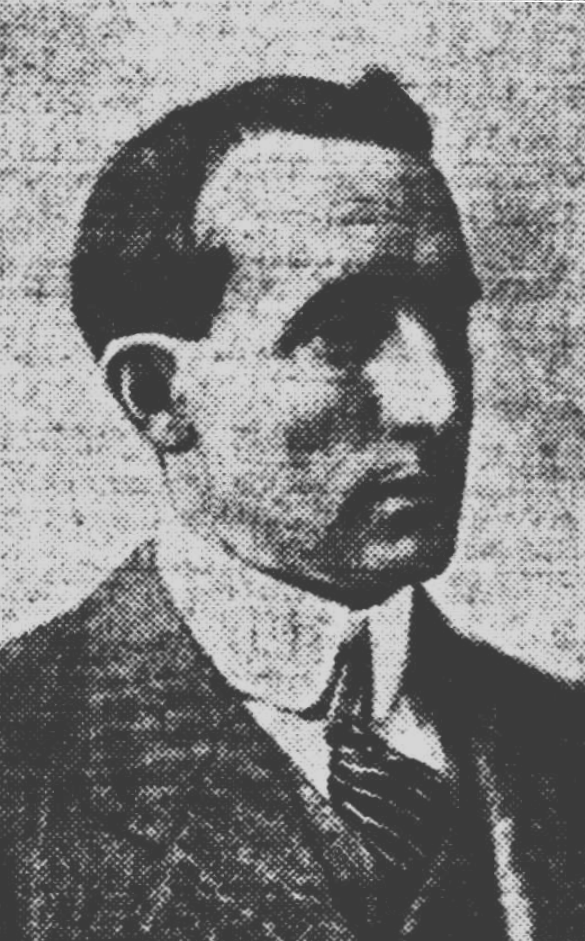

Personal information
- Born: 15 September 1882; Orroroo, South Australia
- Died: 19 May 1943 (aged 60); Unley, Australia
- Source: Cricinfo, 12 August 2020

Harold Kirkwood (15 September 1882 – 19 May 1943) was an Australian cricketer. He played in thirteen first-class matches for South Australia between 1901 and 1914.

== See also ==
- List of South Australian representative cricketers
