= Joe Travers =

Australian sportsman (1871–1942)

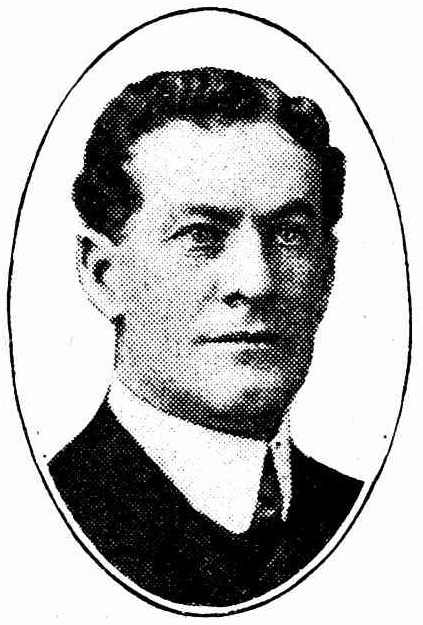

Personal information
- Born: 10 January 1871; Adelaide, South Australia
- Died: 15 August 1942 (aged 71); Adelaide, South Australia
- Batting: Left-handed
- Bowling: Slow left-arm orthodox

International information
- National side: Australia
- Only Test (cap 84): 28 February 1902 v England

Career statistics
Competition	Test	First-class
Matches	1	37
Runs scored	10	760
Batting average	5.00	16.52
100s/50s	0/0	0/2
Top score	9	77
Balls bowled	48	8,977
Wickets	1	117
Bowling average	14.00	31.39
5 wickets in innings	0	5
10 wickets in match	0	1
Best bowling	1/14	9/30
Catches/stumpings	1/–	25/–
- Source: Cricinfo, 10 September 2022

Joseph Patrick Francis "Ike" Travers (10 January 1871 – 15 September 1942) was an Australian cricketer who played in one Test match in 1902. He played Australian rules football for Norwood in the South Australian Football Association (SAFA) during the 1890s.

== Cricket career ==
Travers was very successful at local club level in the South Australian first grade competition during the late 1890s and early 1900s, often taking more wickets in a season than any other player.

After his cricket playing career was over, Travers gave much time and support to the administration side of the game, particularly as a selector, team manager and committee member.

== Death ==
Travers died in 1942 after a long illness.
