= Richard Callaway (umpire) =

Australian cricket umpire (1860–1935)

Richard Callaway (2 August 1860 – 19 March 1935 at Sydney) was an Australian Test cricket umpire. Callaway's younger brother Sydney played Test cricket for Australia.

Callaway umpired 31 first-class matches between 1899 and 1921. He officiated in three Test matches between Australia and England in the 1901/02 season. Umpiring threatened to be controversial in this series, with England captain Archie MacLaren demanding the right to appoint one of the two umpires for the first Test match, at Sydney from 13 December 1901; the New South Wales Cricket Association at first passed a resolution asserting its right to appoint both umpires, but then rescinded the resolution while confirming Callaway as its umpire for the match. In the event, MacLaren did not pursue his demand, and Callaway stood with Bob Crockett from the Victorian Cricket Association umpires' list in a match which England won by an innings.

In addition to cricket, Callaway was involved as an administrator and umpire in attempts to establish baseball in Australia; a report of a baseball benefit match arranged on Callaway's behalf in 1920 in the Sydney Morning Herald stated that "Mr Callaway is regarded as the 'father' of baseball in this State".

Callaway worked for 42 years in the accounts section of the New South Wales Lands Department. He died at his home in the Sydney beachside suburb of North Bondi on 19 March 1935 after a lengthy illness, aged 74. He and his wife Elizabeth had five sons and two daughters.

== See also ==
- List of Test umpires
