= Clem Hill =

Australian cricketer (1877–1945)

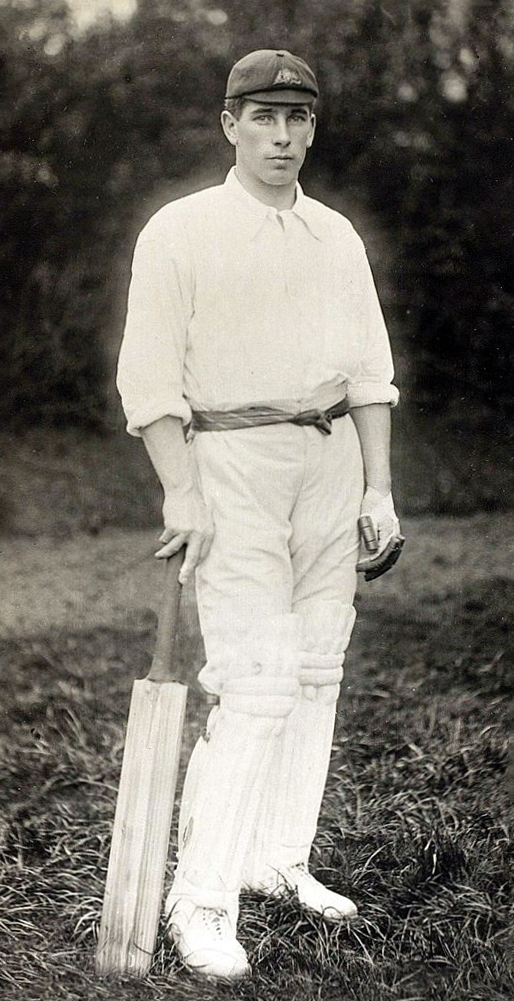
- Hill in about 1905

Personal information
- Full name: Clement Hill
- Born: 18 March 1877; Adelaide, South Australia, British Empire
- Died: 5 September 1945 (aged 68); Parkville, Victoria, Australia
- Nickname: Kruger
- Height: 1.75 m (5 ft 9 in)
- Batting: Left-handed
- Bowling: Right-arm leg spin
- Role: Batsman
- Relatives: Stanley Hill (brother); Les Hill (brother); Arthur Hill (brother); Henry Hill (brother); Percival Hill (brother); Wyndham Hill-Smith (nephew)

International information
- National side: Australia (1896–1912)
- Test debut (cap 74): 22 June 1896 v England
- Last Test: 23 February 1912 v England

Domestic team information
- Years: Team
- 1892/93–1922/23: South Australia

Career statistics
| Competition | Test | First-class |
|---|---|---|
| Matches | 49 | 252 |
| Runs scored | 3,412 | 17,213 |
| Batting average | 39.21 | 43.57 |
| 100s/50s | 7/19 | 45/83 |
| Top score | 191 | 365* |
| Balls bowled | – | 510 |
| Wickets | – | 10 |
| Bowling average | – | 32.20 |
| 5 wickets in innings | – | 0 |
| 10 wickets in match | – | 0 |
| Best bowling | – | 2/10 |
| Catches/stumpings | 33/– | 168/1 |
- Source: CricketArchive, 26 January 2008

Clement Hill (18 March 1877 – 5 September 1945) was an Australian cricketer who played 49 Test matches as a specialist batsman between 1896 and 1912. He captained the Australian team in ten Tests, winning five and losing five. A prolific run scorer, Hill scored 3,412 runs in Test cricket—a world record at the time of his retirement—at an average of 39.21 per innings, including seven centuries. In 1902, Hill was the first batsman to make 1,000 Test runs in a calendar year, a feat that would not be repeated for 45 years. His innings of 365*, scored against New South Wales for South Australia in 1900–01, was a Sheffield Shield record for 27 years. The South Australian Cricket Association named a grandstand at the Adelaide Oval in his honour in 2003 and he was inducted into the Australian Cricket Hall of Fame in 2005. Hill is regarded as one of the best batsman of his era.

A stocky left-handed batsman, Hill had a crouched, somewhat awkward stance: he gripped the bat low on the handle, playing with a strong bottom hand. His batting style was nonetheless attractive and effective and he was especially strong on the leg side and when cutting. Able to score quickly when required, he was also recognised for his patience and strong defence. Hill normally batted at No. 3 and, along with his contemporary Victor Trumper, he was a mainstay of the Australian batting line-up in the early years of the 20th century. Hill had a strong throwing arm and was an excellent outfielder. He was a popular team-mate and captain, respected for his directness, honesty and cheerfulness.

He played his first first-class cricket match for South Australia while still a schoolboy, aged 16. By the time he was 19, he had been included in the Australian team touring England in 1896, where he made his Test match début. At the Melbourne Cricket Ground two years later, Hill scored 188; his maiden Test century and still the highest score in Ashes Tests by a player under 21. He was named one of Wisden Cricketers of the Year in 1899, despite missing half the English season due to illness. In the 1901–02 season, Hill was dismissed in consecutive innings for 99, 98 and 97. In total he was dismissed between 90 and 99 five times in Test cricket. In 1903–04, Hill was at the centre of a riot at the Sydney Cricket Ground after he was adjudged run out in a Test match against England. With Roger Hartigan he still holds the Australian Test record partnership for the eighth wicket—243, made against England at the Adelaide Oval in 1907–08.

Hill had a strained relationship with Australian cricket authorities. He turned down an invitation to tour England in 1909 due to his unhappiness with the contract terms offered. Despite this, he was appointed Test captain in 1910–11 for the series against South Africa. His Test cricket career ended in controversy after he was involved in a brawl with cricket administrator and fellow Test selector Peter McAlister in 1912. He was one of the "Big Six", a group of leading Australian cricketers who boycotted the 1912 Triangular Tournament in England when the players were stripped of the right to appoint the tour manager. The boycott effectively ended his Test career. After retiring from cricket, Hill worked in the horse racing industry as a stipendiary steward and later as a handicapper for races including the Caulfield Cup. Hill died in 1945 aged 68 when thrown from a tram in Melbourne in a traffic accident.

== Early life ==
Hill was born on 18 March 1877 in Adelaide, South Australia, to Henry John Hill (known as John) and his wife Rebecca, née Saunders, and grandson of Henry Hill MHA. Clem Hill was born on the rest day of the first ever cricket Test, played between Australia and England in Melbourne.

Clem was one of eight sons and eight daughters in a family that was heavily involved in cricket. His father scored a century (102 not out) for North Adelaide against the touring Kent County Cricket Club, reportedly the first century scored at the Adelaide Oval. Six other brothers played for South Australia and in 1912–13 there were several instances of three Hill brothers in the same representative team.

Clem's father was prominent in the Methodist Church and sent Clem to be educated at Prince Alfred College, the local Methodist school. "Inter-collegiate" matches, the annual fixtures against rivals St Peter's College, were fiercely contested. Hill played his first inter-collegiate match at the age of 13, keeping wicket and batting at number ten. His hands suffered from keeping wicket to the fast bowling of future Test team-mate Ernie Jones, leading to a decision to concentrate on batting. At 16, he scored 360 in the inter-collegiate match, a schoolboy record, bettering the mark made earlier by Joe Darling. Despite this, a school sportsmaster threatened to leave him out of the School XI (cricket team) if he continued to play the risky hook shot.

Hill made his first-class cricket début in March 1893 while still a schoolboy, just nine days past his 16th birthday. Included in the South Australian team to play Western Australia at the Adelaide Oval, he failed to score a run; he was dismissed for a duck in the first innings and was 0 not out in the second as South Australia won by 10 wickets. In the 1894–95 season, at 17 years of age, he played the touring English team led by A.E. Stoddart, scoring 20 in his only innings in the match.

Later the same season, Hill became a regular member of the South Australian team, making his Sheffield Shield debut against Victoria. Batting at number nine, he scored only 21 but the manner in which he made them saw the Australian Test wicket-keeper Jack Blackham declare the discovery of another great batsman. The English team returned to the Adelaide Oval and this time Hill scored his maiden first-class century, 150 not out, against quality bowlers including Tom Richardson and Bobby Peel. So good was the quality of Hill's batting that when he reached his century a cab driver spectator, sitting on his cab, "cheered end clapped so much [he] fell through the roof of the vehicle".

In his first season of regular first-class cricket, Hill scored 335 runs in nine innings at an average of 47.85.

Hill was also a talented Australian rules footballer and played for the South Adelaide Football Club during the 1890s and early 1900s.

== Test cricket ==
=== Selection and early career ===
Hill topped the averages for South Australia in the 1895–96 season, scoring 371 runs in seven innings. An Australian team to tour England in 1896 was selected towards the end of the season and Hill was not included. A disappointed Hill responded by scoring 206 against New South Wales, who were captained by an Australian selector, Tom Garrett. Experienced cricket watchers were impressed with Hill's ability at such a young age to control the strike, scoring 154 from his team's last 197 runs. Following this performance, public demand saw the selectors draft the 19-year-old Hill into the touring squad.

Hill was one of four batsmen touring England for the first time; Joe Darling, Frank Iredale and Harry Donnan were the others. All four scored more than 1,000 runs for the tour with Hill scoring 1,196 runs at an average of 27.81. According to Wisden Cricketers' Almanack, Hill "was a brilliant success" and his batting on good wickets during the tour was "first rate". Hill made his Test début in the First Test at Lord's. Australia collapsed in the first innings to be all out for 53 with Hill bowled by George Lohmann for one. England made 292 runs in reply but the second innings saw an Australian fightback. The captain, Harry Trott (143), was partnered by Syd Gregory (103) to help Australia to a score of 347, setting England 109 runs to win. Hill failed again scoring only five, bowled this time by Jack Hearne. Rain made England's task a little more difficult but they were able to make the runs for the loss of only four wickets. Hill played in the remaining two Tests, but managed to score only 30 runs in the series. Australia lost the series and the Ashes by two Tests to one.

The next Ashes series was held in 1897–98 with Stoddart again assembling an English team to tour Australia. The team included players such as K.S. Ranjitsinhji and George Hirst. The touring team's first match on arrival was against South Australia and Hill batted well, scoring exactly 200. The First Test was played in Sydney and a minor controversy ensued when officials abandoned the first day's play due to earlier heavy rain without consulting the two captains. The delay did not seem to affect the English who batted first and scored 551, including centuries by Ranjitsinhji and Archie MacLaren. The Australians were forced to follow-on after making 237. Batting again, Hill scored 96 but England managed to win the match by nine wickets. The Second Test was played in Melbourne and Australia fought back, winning by an innings and 55 runs with Hill scoring 58. Another innings victory in the Third Test in Adelaide saw Australia leading the series two Tests to one.

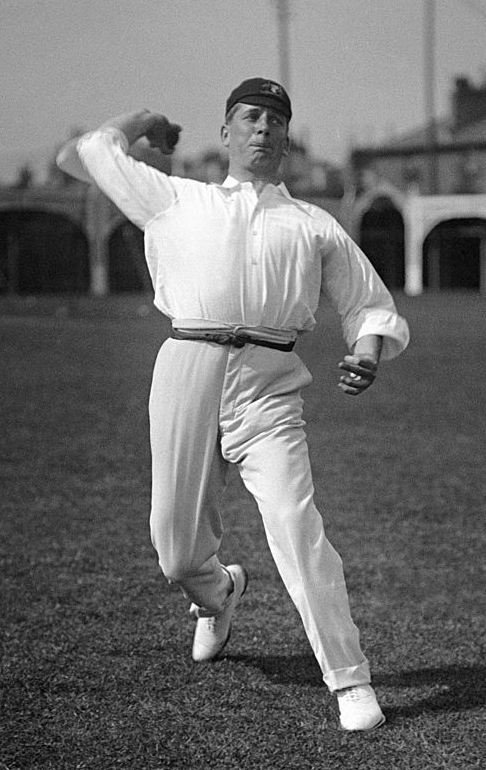
Hill in the early 1900s

The teams returned to Melbourne for the Fourth Test. England started the match brilliantly, reducing Australia to 6/58 on a pitch that assisted the bowlers. Hill, aged just 20, was watching at the non-striker's end as the wickets fell. Hugh Trumble came to join him and together they began to rescue the Australian innings. When Hill reached his maiden Test century, he had scored all but 42 of his team's runs. Hill played balls pitched outside leg stump particularly well and drove beautifully throughout the innings. At the tea interval, Hill, feeling refreshed, mentioned to Trumble that he thought he would "have a go at them now". The experienced Trumble cautioned Hill, replying "You young devil, you have to stop there. Go along as you have been doing." Hill and Trumble made 165 runs batting together, still a record for a seventh wicket partnership in Ashes Tests. Hill was 182 not out at the end of the day's play, the highest first-day innings against England in Australia, and leaving the ground was greeted by a barrage of photographers. After a rest day, Hill added only six more runs before being dismissed at last by Hearne. His innings remains the highest in Ashes Tests by a player under 21. Batting for 294 minutes he gave only the one chance at dismissal. The journalist and former Test player Tom Horan wrote "Hill's innings will be talked of when the smallest boy who saw it will be white with the snows of time." Australia won the Test by 8 wickets to recover the Ashes. That summer, Hill scored 1,196 runs in 19 innings including five centuries, the first Australian to score 1,000 runs in a home season.

=== Consolidation ===
During the Australian team's tour of England in 1899, Hill required surgery to remove a growth in his nose. The after-effects of the operation were more serious than expected; Hill lost an alarming amount of weight and strength and missed around half of the tour. Before this, Hill was recognised by Wisden Cricketers' Almanack as the best of the Australian batsmen that English summer. He scored 301 runs in three Tests at an average of 60.20, and was named as one of the Wisden Cricketers of the Year. His best performance of the series was in the Second Test at Lord's. Hill scored 135, sharing a partnership of 82 with Victor Trumper, who was playing only his second Test match. Trumper went on to score 135 not out. Hill, who was dropped by Ranjitsinhji fielding at slip when he had made 119, batted for 4 hours and hit 17 boundaries. Australia won the Test, the only one to have a definite result, by 10 wickets and retained the Ashes.

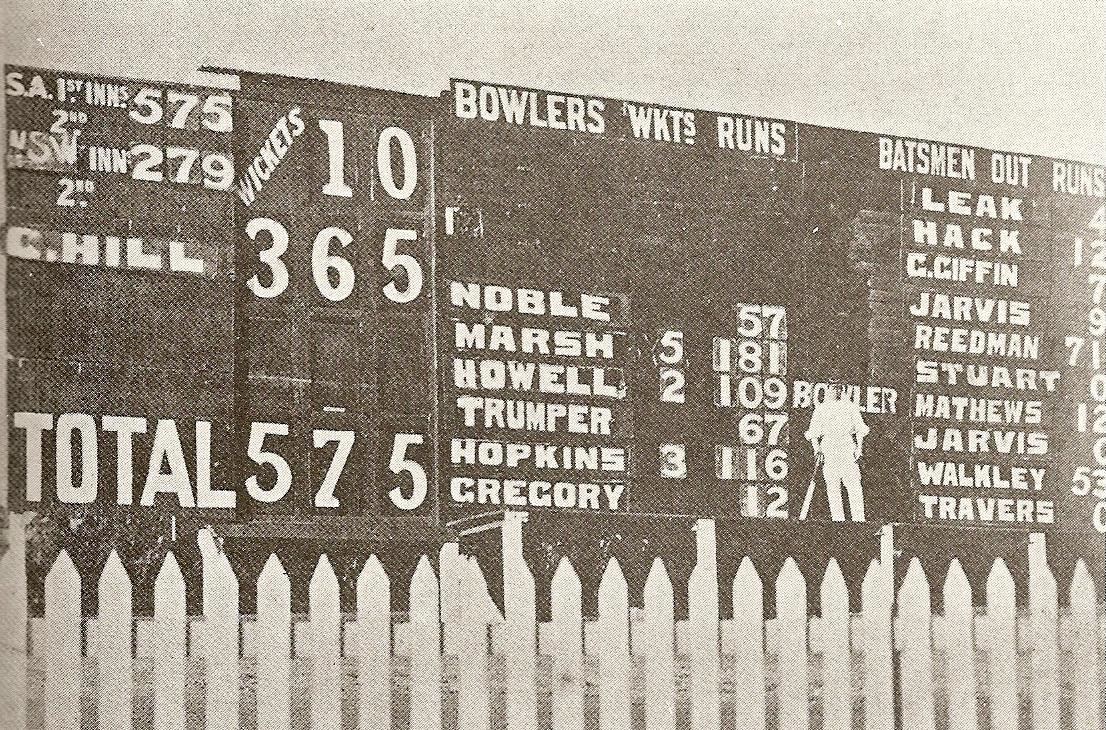
Hill standing in front of the Adelaide Oval scoreboard after scoring 365 against New South Wales in 1900–01

In 1900–01, Hill made a then record Sheffield Shield score for South Australia against New South Wales at the Adelaide Oval. He batted for 8 hours and 35 minutes for 365, including 35 boundaries. The record stood for 27 years until beaten by Bill Ponsford. Hill averaged more than 100 runs for the season. England returned to contest the Ashes in 1901–02, under the captaincy of Archie MacLaren. The English team was weakened by the unavailability of players such as Ranjitsinhji, Hirst, C.B. Fry and Wilfred Rhodes. The surprise selection was Sydney Barnes, who had played most of his cricket in the Lancashire League. Repeating the result of the series three years earlier, Australia lost the First Test but won the next four comfortably to retain the Ashes. Hill was the leading run scorer in the series, with 521 runs including 99, 98 and 97 in successive innings. He is still the only person to achieve this most unusual feat.

Hill was the victim of bad luck during this sequence of scores between 90 and 99. At Melbourne during the New Years Test he scored 99; the first time a batsman was dismissed one run short of a century in Test cricket. In the first innings in the next Test in Adelaide, having scored 98, Hill was caught by Johnny Tyldesley who was standing on the bicycle track surrounding the oval. Tyldesley attempted to call Hill back but Hill declined, saying the captains had agreed that the fence was the boundary, not the track. Under modern laws, he would have been not out and the shot would count as six runs, allowing him his century. In the second innings, Hill's poor luck continued. He chopped down on a ball when 97 and then, to his horror, saw the ball rolling back towards his stumps. He attempted to hit the ball away from the stumps but accidentally knocked the leg bail and was out, bowled. The English writer, Simon Wilde, has described this sequence as an "unparalleled spell of nonagenarians' neurosis".

Hill visited England for a third time in 1902 with the Australian team who won their fourth successive Test series. In the process the Australians "beat the records of all their predecessors in the country" by losing only two of 39 matches during the tour. For the second time, Hill scored more than 1,000 runs in an English summer; 1,534 at an average of 31.95 including four centuries. Rain affected the first two Test matches at Edgbaston and Lord's and both teams moved to Sheffield without a win.

The Third Test, the only Test match played at Bramall Lane, saw Hill play one of his finest innings on a poorly prepared pitch that made batting difficult. Australia batted first and could only score 194, Barnes taking 6 wickets for 49 runs. In return Monty Noble and Jack Saunders bowled England out for 145 and Australia led by 49 runs on the first innings. When Reggie Duff was dismissed in the second innings, Hill joined Trumper at the wicket. The pair scored 60 runs in half an hour before Trumper was out, caught by the wicket-keeper. He was followed quickly by the captain, Darling, out for a duck. Syd Gregory was the next batsman and with Hill added 107 runs in only 67 minutes. In semi-darkness and facing fast and accurate bowling on a poor pitch, Hill pushed on to reach his century after 115 minutes of batting. He had given two difficult chances, one at slip when 74 and in the outfield at 77 before he was caught by MacLaren from the bowling of Jackson for 119. Australia won the Test by 143 runs. The final two Tests were thrillers. Australia won the Fourth Test at Old Trafford by a mere three runs with Trumble taking ten wickets for the match. England won the Fifth and final Test at The Oval by one wicket. Chasing 263, England were 5/48 when Gilbert Jessop began an extraordinary display of hitting, scoring a century in only 75 minutes to help England to victory. Of Hill's form during the tour, Wisden Cricketers' Almanack said "Clement Hill played many fine innings, his best performance being in the Test match at Sheffield, but, even allowing for the soft wickets, I do not think he was so great a batsman as in 1899."

On the return trip to Australia, the touring team stopped in South Africa to play three Tests, the first Tests between the two nations. Hill was the most successful Australian batsman in the series, scoring 327 runs at an average of 81.75. In the First Test he made 145 when Australia was in trouble after following-on, an innings described in Wisden as "marred by very few mistakes". In the Third Test, Hill batted through much of the Australian first innings to make 91 not out. Australia won the Test by ten wickets and the series two Tests to nil.

=== Establishment ===
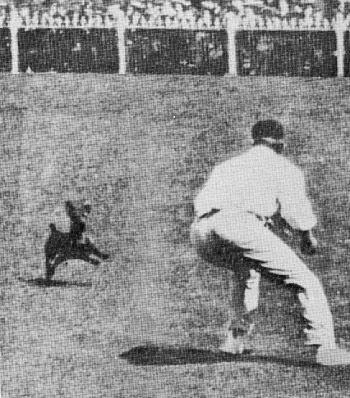
Hill attempts to stop a pitch invading dog in the Fourth Test in Melbourne in 1908.

For the first time under the auspices of the Marylebone Cricket Club, an English team travelled to Australia for the 1903–04 season to contest the Ashes. Contrary to expectations before the tour, the English won the series and the Ashes three Tests to two. Hill trailed Trumper and Noble in the series averages, making 276 runs at 27.60 without ever getting to 100 in an innings. In the First Test, Hill was at the centre of what Wisden described as a "very regrettable and indeed disgraceful [crowd] demonstration". Batting with Trumper, Hill had run well past the stumps at the bowler's end for a fourth run. The English return gave the Australian pair an opportunity for an overthrow. Hill had to run the entire length of the pitch. Albert Relf at mid-on gathered and threw to the wicket-keeper, Dick Lilley who removed the bails and appealed for the run out. Umpire Bob Crockett gave Hill out. Hill could not believe the decision as the ball had passed behind him when he slid his bat to make his ground. The crowd were also convinced that Hill was not out and began to hoot, chanting "Crock!, Crock!, Crock!" Bottles were thrown onto the surrounding cycle track and the English captain Plum Warner threatened to take his team from the ground. At the end of the day, Crockett required a police escort when leaving the ground. Hill's best performance of the series was at his home town, Adelaide, in the Third Test. Hill scored 88 before being dismissed by Ted Arnold, caught by the wicket-keeper. Australia won the Test by 216 runs.

Hill toured England for the last time with the 1905 Australian team. The Test series was dominated by what was seen as uninspired cricket with England retaining the Ashes two Tests to nil. The Australian batting suffered from a lack of steadiness and Hill was one of the Australians criticised by Wisden that season; "[Hill] would certainly have met with more consistent success if he had retained his old self-control. He was somewhat indiscriminate in hitting at the off-ball, and many a time his impatience cost him his wicket." However Wisden praised his fielding, saying "Trumper, Hill, and Hopkins did any amount of fine work in the deep field".

The Australians recovered the Ashes from the 1907–08 English team, winning the series four Tests to one. England were hit by the loss of their captain, Arthur Jones who contracted an illness that threatened to develop into pneumonia, causing him to miss the first three Tests. Hill, batting with team-mate Roger Hartigan playing his first Test match, set a record in the Third Test in Adelaide. Suffering from influenza and unable to field in the English first innings, Hill joined Hartigan at the fall of the seventh wicket. During his innings, Hill vomited beside the pitch and had to quickly leave the field several times. The pair managed to bat on and take the match into a fourth day. Hartigan, whose leave from work had expired, was relieved to receive a telegram from his employer: "Stay as long as you are making runs." When Hartigan was dismissed for 116, the pair had together made 243 for the eighth wicket—still an Australian Test record. With Sammy Carter, Hill continued before finally dismissed by Jack Crawford for 160, after 5 hours and 19 minutes of batting. At the end of his innings Hill was close to collapse but his efforts assisted his team defeat the English by 245 runs.

=== Captain ===
Australia were due to tour England to contest the Ashes in 1909. Hill, along with other senior players, was fighting against a proposal to move the management of international tours away from the players to the new Australian Board of Control for International Cricket Matches. Hill by now was a team selector and strongly opposed the selection in the team of 40-year-old Peter McAlister, who Hill claimed "was past his best" and "not suited to English conditions". McAlister was also a member of the selection panel and was able to secure a majority for his selection. Hill accused his fellow selectors of conspiracy and said he had "decided to wash his hands of the affair" and that "he did not consider that the best men had been chosen". Hill's relationship with McAlister would remain fractious. Hill was also a delegate on the Board of Control, representing the South Australian Cricket Association (SACA). At the Board meeting in February 1909 to set the terms to be offered to the players selected for the tour, the SACA delegates were outvoted on every point. Hill declined to accept the terms offered. Since his marriage in 1905, Hill had spent considerable time away from his wife with his commitments during two Test series against England and this may have also influenced his decision not to tour.

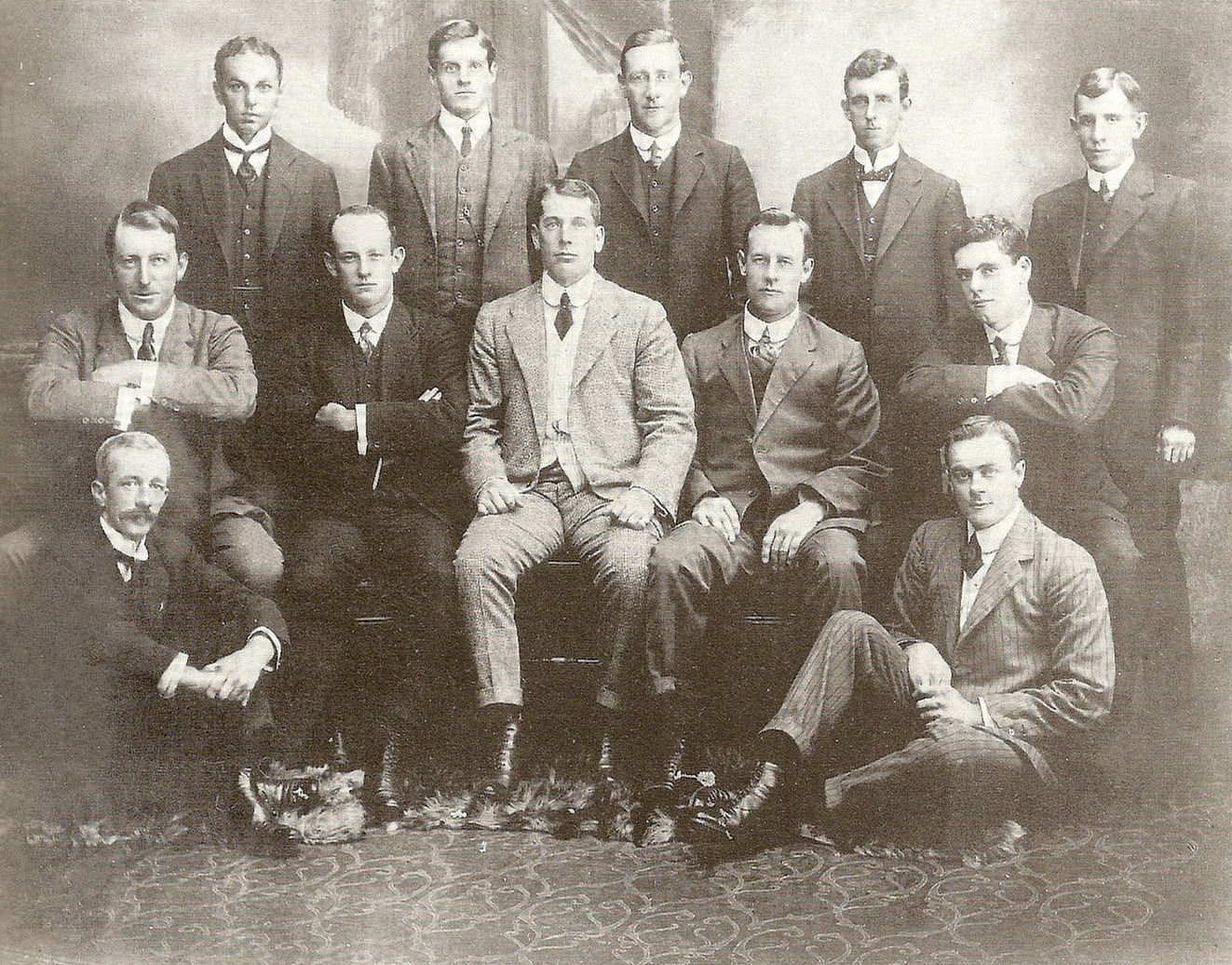
Hill (centre, third from left) was captain of the 1911–12 Australian team.

When Hill returned to the Test team it was as captain for a series against the visiting South Africa national cricket team in 1910–11. The South Africans, led by Aubrey Faulkner, had a novel bowling attack consisting of several googly bowlers, such as Bert Vogler, Reggie Schwarz and Faulkner himself and the slow left-arm wrist-spin bowler Charlie "Buck" Llewellyn. The South Africans started the tour well, defeating a South Australian team unable to handle the unusual bowling approach. Hill, after consulting with other players, settled on a strategy of hitting the bowlers off their length with aggressive batting. Hill showed the way in the First Test at Sydney, scoring his first 100 runs in 98 minutes. In a partnership with Warren Bardsley, the pair scored 224 runs in only two hours. After just 3 hours and 20 minutes at the crease, he was dismissed for 191; his highest Test score. Australia won the Test by an innings and 114 runs. Australia won the Second Test in Melbourne after bowling the South Africans out for 80 in their second innings, but the South Africans fought back to win the Third Test in Adelaide by 38 runs. Australia won the Fourth Test by 508 runs after being sent in to bat by South Africa, who hoped to trap them on a rain-affected wicket. The Australians managed to end the first day's play at 8/317 to avoid the trap and win the Test. In the second innings, Hill hit another century (100) in only 100 minutes, with Wisden noting that he "play[ed] especially well". Australia won the final Test and the series four Tests to one.

=== Brawl and boycott ===
Hill's Test career ended in controversy amid another dispute with the Board of Control. He was once again appointed captain of the Australian team against an English team captained by Johnny Douglas in 1911–12. The English team included bowlers of the calibre of Barnes and Frank Foster and, after losing the first Test in Sydney, won all four remaining Tests to secure the Ashes. Hill had a lean season with the bat, managing 274 runs at an average of 27.40. The England bowlers were clearly superior to the Australian batsmen; Trumper was the only Australian to score a century during the Tests. While this series took place, the Board of Control made plans to usurp the commonly accepted right of the players to appoint the team manager when touring England. In response, a group of senior players, including Hill, threatened to withdraw from the next tour, to take place in 1912, unless their choice, Frank Laver, was appointed.

Matters came to a head when Hill sent a telegram to fellow selector, Peter McAlister, urging the inclusion of the New South Wales all-rounder Charlie Macartney in the team for the Fourth Test in Melbourne. The reply from McAlister—a member of the Board of Control who still bore some animosity towards Hill from past comments—to Hill's request was "... Still opposed to Macartney's inclusion. If Iredale (another selector) agrees with you as to Macartney's inclusion, I favour yourself standing down not Minnett." Hill saw the offer to remove himself from the team as sore provocation and his team-mates scorned the suggestion. Australia lost the Third Test by seven wickets. Macartney wrote later, "Persistent ill-feeling seriously affected the morale of the side." At a meeting held after the Test, the Board of Control rejected the players' petition and declared that the manager would be appointed by the Board alone. At a "special meeting" two weeks later, the Board appointed George Crouch from Queensland to the position of tour manager.

The following day, 3 February 1912, the selection committee met in Sydney to decide the team for the Fourth Test. It was the first time Hill and McAlister had met since the exchange of telegrams. The pair exchanged insults with McAlister sharply criticising Hill's captaincy. Hill retorted, "In England, Armstrong wouldn't play under you. Did you ever win any except second rate games?"

McAlister replied, "I am a better captain than Trumper, Armstrong and yourself put together. You are the worst captain I have ever seen." Hill then warned McAlister to stop insulting him but McAlister repeated the remark. Losing control, Hill struck McAlister a blow across the face. The two then grappled for around ten minutes. Blood was drawn, staining their clothes and splashing on the other men present, Iredale and secretary Sydney Smith. At one stage, fearing that one or both combatants would fall through the window and onto the street, Smith grabbed hold of Hill's coat-tails. The fight ended with a bloody McAlister lying on the floor and Hill, unmarked, standing over him. Hill told Smith he could no longer work with McAlister. Smith then asked Hill to put his resignation in writing and the Board accepted it that evening.

The crowds at the Melbourne and Sydney Tests gave Hill three cheers when he arrived at the wicket. When Hill reached the batting crease in his last Test at Sydney, the umpire Bob Crockett said "there were tears in his eyes". An in camera investigation into the fracas took place; the Board's only comment on the meeting was to report that it had been "satisfactorily settled". Hill was then offered an invitation to take part in the 1912 Triangular Tournament in England. Hill declined the invitation, along with Warwick Armstrong, Trumper, Cotter, Noble and Vernon Ransford, who collectively became known as the "Big Six". He never played Test cricket again.

=== Retirement and legacy ===
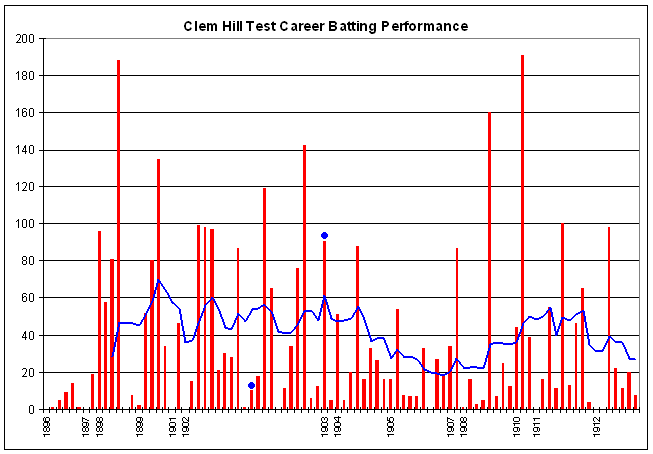
An innings-by-innings breakdown of Hill's Test match batting career, showing runs scored (red bars) and the average of the last ten innings (blue line). The blue dots indicate an innings where he was not dismissed.

At the age of 43, Hill returned to first-class cricket for one match to assist in its re-establishment in Australia after the Great War. In support of the benefits of some former colleagues, he played in a further two first-class matches with his best score of 66 coming in a game against Victoria. His last match was for an Australian XI against New South Wales played to support Bill Howell's benefit.

In all Tests, Hill scored 3,412 runs at an average just under 40 runs per innings and including seven centuries. When he retired he had scored more runs in Test cricket than any other player; a record he held for 12 years until surpassed by Jack Hobbs. In 1902 Hill was the first to score 1,000 Test runs in a calendar year; the next to do so was Denis Compton 45 years later in 1947. Prolific in Australian state cricket as well, he headed the South Australian first-class averages on ten occasions between 1895–96 and 1910–11. In successive innings in 1909–10 he scored 175 against Victoria in Adelaide, 205 against New South Wales and 185 against Victoria in Melbourne. He was the only Australian to score more than 17,000 runs in the period before pitches were protected from rain. In club cricket he averaged more than 100 runs for the season on three occasions.

In 2003, the South Australian Cricket Association named the new southern grandstand at the Adelaide Oval the "Clem Hill Stand" in recognition of his contribution to South Australian cricket. Hill was inducted into the Australian Cricket Hall of Fame in 2005.

== Outside cricket ==
Hill served an engineering apprenticeship at the government workshops in Islington. On retirement from cricket, however, Hill began a career in horse racing administration. He was employed as a stipendiary steward with the South Australian Jockey Club and the Adelaide Racing Club and in 1937 he was appointed handicapper for the Victoria Amateur Turf Club (VATC) in Melbourne. At the VATC he was responsible for setting the weights for the Caulfield Cup, one of Australia's richest and most prestigious horse races. He served in this role for six years before poor health saw him take a less demanding role at the Geelong Racing Club.

Hill married Florence "Florrie" Hart, granddaughter of William Hart M.L.C. in Tasmania in 1905. The couple settled in Adelaide and raised two daughters, Lesley and Brenda. When he took up his role with the VATC, Hill and his family moved to Toorak, an eastern suburb of Melbourne. In 1945, Hill was thrown from a tram in a traffic accident on busy Collins Street in inner Melbourne. He was taken to Royal Melbourne Hospital and died there soon after aged 68. His body was returned for burial at North Road Cemetery in the Adelaide suburb of Nailsworth.

== Style and personality ==
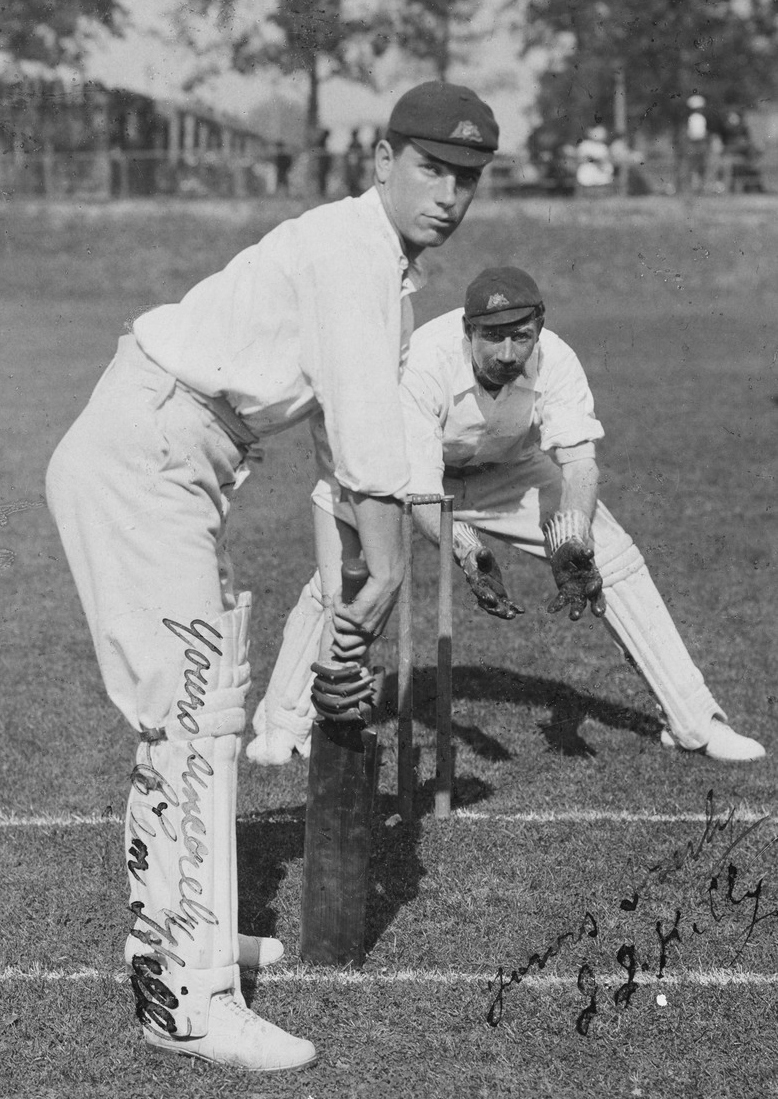
Hill demonstrating his unusual grip and stance

Short and stocky, Hill was a gifted batsman who could score quickly when required. Wisden described Hill as a "specially brilliant batsman on hard pitches". He had an awkward crouched stance, gripping the bat low on the handle. This limited his forward reach and power and reduced his effectiveness when driving but he compensated for this with quick footwork. Hill's strong bottom hand and his keen eye allowed him to play the cut shot cleanly and with confidence and to hit powerfully on the leg side. He preferred batting against fast bowling rather than slow and medium pace bowlers and he was a fearless exponent of the hook shot. Hill had a tendency to get out in the "nervous nineties", being dismissed six times between 90 and 99 in Test matches. This included a sequence in the 1901–02 series against England of 99, 98 and 97 in successive innings.

While able to drive hard to the off or straight, usually with the ball kept down, Clem Hill scored chiefly on the leg side by skilful strokes perfectly timed and placed, the way in which he turned straight balls clear of fieldsmen being exceptional. Brilliant square and late cutting made Hill delightful to watch and in defence his style claimed admiration while his patience was unlimited

— Wisden obituary,

An excellent fielder in the deep, Hill had a powerful throwing arm. During a match at Leeds during the 1902 tour of England, he threw a ball from near the boundary, knocking down the stumps at one end and rebounding to hit the stumps the other end. During the same tour at Old Trafford, Hill made a catch that Wisden claimed "will never be forgotten by [those present]". A Dick Lilley hit to square leg looked likely to clear the boundary. Hill himself said he raced 25 yards (23 m) for it with a view simply to save a boundary. In the event, he ran round 'close to the boundary' from his position at long on, aided by the wind seemingly holding up the ball to take the catch low down in front of the pavilion in his outstretched hands; one that Wisden said "few fieldsmen would have thought worth attempting".

Hill was a man of high ideals and was popular with his fellow players. Pelham Warner commented on his pleasant nature and Robert Trumble, an author and son of Hugh Trumble, recalled him as honest, direct and without guile. An anecdote told about Hill had him hitting a low shot into shadows where Warren Bardsley was fielding. He completed one run and then asked the umpire if the ball had been caught. The shadow made it impossible for the umpire to see, so Hill then asked Bardsley, "Did you catch it?" When Bardsley replied in the affirmative, Hill immediately walked to the pavilion. When England won four Tests in a row in 1911–12, Hill managed to retain the confidence of his players. Frank Iredale wrote that Hill was a cheery skipper whose men were happy under his leadership. Despite breaking many records, Hill showed little awareness of them. When watching Jack Hobbs break his record for the most runs in Test cricket at Headingley in 1926, it was Hobbs' wife sitting nearby who had to remind Hill that the record was previously his.

== Notes ==
| Preceded by Monty Noble | Australian Test cricket captains 1910–12 | Succeeded by Syd Gregory |
