= Bill Howell (cricketer) =

Australian cricketer

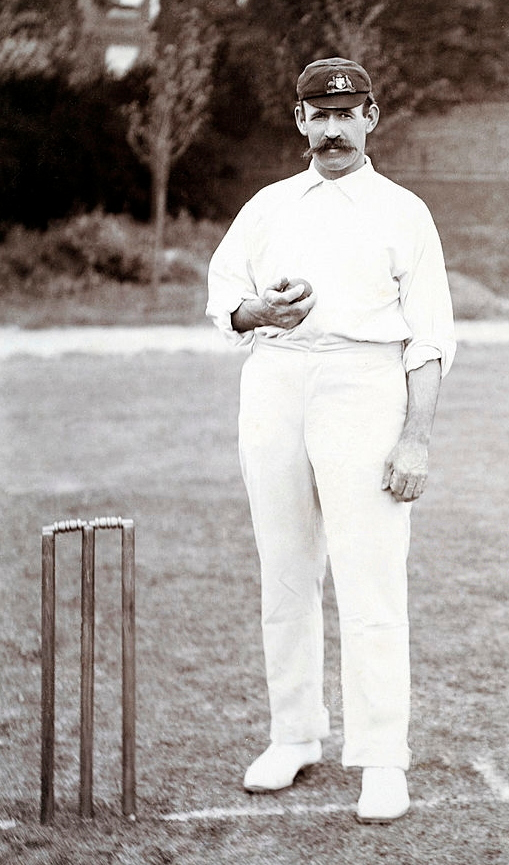

Personal information
- Full name: William Peter Howell
- Born: 29 December 1869; Penrith, New South Wales, Australia
- Died: 14 July 1940 (aged 70); Castlereagh, New South Wales, Australia
- Height: 177 cm (5 ft 10 in)
- Batting: Left-handed
- Bowling: Right-arm medium
- Role: All rounder

International information
- National side: Australia
- Test debut (cap 77): 14 January 1898 v England
- Last Test: 15 January 1904 v England

Career statistics
Competition	Test	First-class
Matches	18	141
Runs scored	158	2,227
Batting average	7.52	14.84
100s/50s	0/0	1/6
Top score	35	128
Balls bowled	3,892	27,832
Wickets	49	519
Bowling average	28.71	21.49
5 wickets in innings	1	30
10 wickets in match	0	5
Best bowling	5/81	10/28
Catches/stumpings	12/–	126/–
- Source: Cricinfo, 10 September 2022

William Peter Howell (29 December 1869 – 14 July 1940) was an Australian cricketer who played in 18 Test matches between 1898 and 1904.

Howell was born at Penrith, New South Wales in 1869. He made his Test debut against England at Adelaide in January 1898. He toured England in 1899 and 1902, and South Africa in 1902, playing in a total of 18 Tests. During the 1899 tour he took all ten wickets in a tour match against Surrey during Australia's 1899 tour of England, after which he became a regular member the tour XI.

In 1902 Tom Dickson convened a meeting of local cricketers at the Commercial Hotel in Penrith which formed the Nepean District Cricket Association. Locally, Howell took ten wickets for ten runs in one match, and in another hit seven sixes from a seven ball over.

A tall and well built man, Howell turned the ball effectively at a medium pace and bowled to a good length. On the matting wickets in South Africa, he turned the ball sharply in 1902 when Joe Darling led the Australian team to success, taking 14 wickets at 12.42 in the two games he played.

While overseas in 1902, his parents, George and Hannah Howell (née Colless) died within days of each other. They owned two farms valued at £1,165. After his retirement from international cricket Bill Howell returned to one farm at Castlereagh, while his brother Athol took up the adjoining farm. In 1899, Bill married Neva, the daughter of James and Sarah Hunter of Emu Plains.

Howell died at Castlereagh, New South Wales. In 1957, the cricket oval at Penrith Stadium was named after him.
