= Deaths in February 1982 =

The following is a list of notable deaths in February 1982.

Entries for each day are listed alphabetically by surname. A typical entry lists information in the following sequence:

- Name, age, country of citizenship at birth, subsequent country of citizenship (if applicable), reason for notability, cause of death (if known), and reference.

== February 1982 ==
=== 1 ===
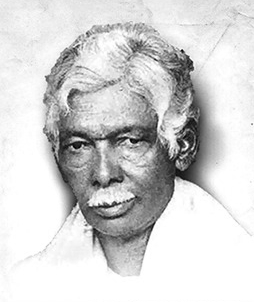
Raghunath Murmu

- Eilert Bøhm, 81, Norwegian gymnast and Olympian
- Joseph C. Burger, 79, United States Marine Corps officer and college athlete
- Ed Edelen, 69, American professional baseball player and physician
- Rennos Frangoudis, 72, Greek sprinter
- Amzie Moore, 70, American civil rights leader and entrepreneur
- Ernests Mālers, 78, Latvian cyclist
- Raghunath Murmu, 76, Indian Santali writer and educator
- John T. Power, 98, Irish hurler
- Sally Stanford 78, American madam and mayor of Sausalito, California
- Erwin Vierow, 91, general in the Wehrmacht of Nazi Germany during World War II

=== 2 ===
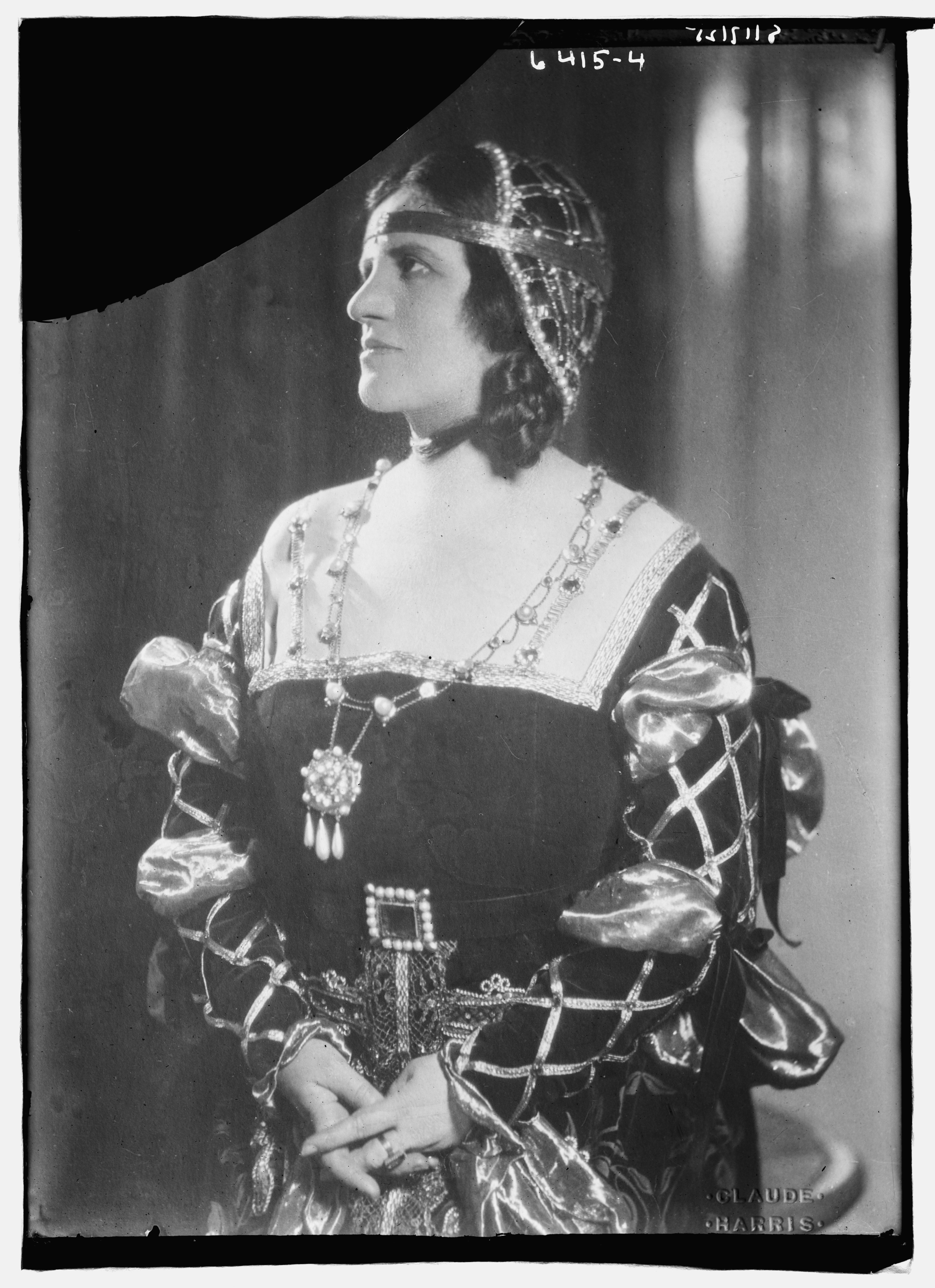
Gemma Bosini

- Stringfellow Barr, 85, American historian, author, and former president of St. John's College
- Gemma Bosini, 91, Italian operatic soprano
- Paul Desruisseaux, 76, Canadian lawyer, businessman, and politician
- William F. Devin, 84, four-time mayor of Seattle
- Paulino Frydman, 87, Polish chess master
- Karl Hanft, 77, Austrian actor
- Jaisukhlal Hathi, 73, Indian politician
- Otto Ites, 63, German naval officer
- Bruce Kekwick, 71, Australian politician
- Roy Kemp, 86, Australian rules footballer
- Tommy Mather, 73, British diver and Olympian
- Jacque Mercer, 51, winner of the 1949 Miss America pageant
- Antenor Patiño, 86, Bolivian tycoon
- Harrold Sincock, 74, Australian cricketer
- Belle S. Spafford, 86, ninth Relief Society General President of the Church of Jesus Christ of Latter-day Saints
- Mohan Lal Sukhadia, 65, Indian politician

=== 3 ===
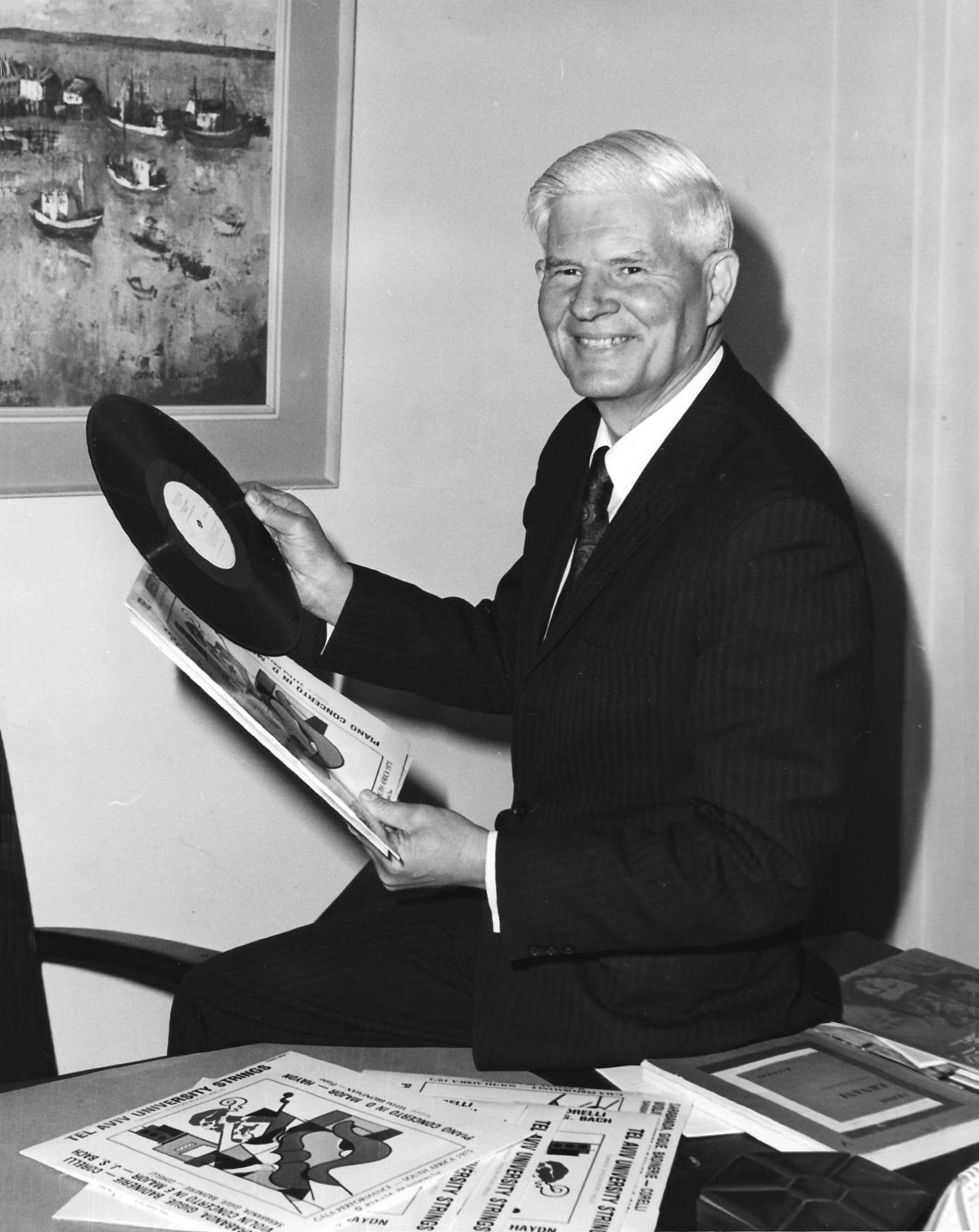
Anton Hartman

- František Fišera, 81, Czech cross-country skier
- Anton Hartman, 63, South African conductor
- John A. Hilger, 73, American air force general and participant of the Doolittle Raid
- Efraín Huerta, 67, Mexican poet and journalist
- Adolfo Moreno Lajaña, 74, Chilean physician and politician
- Gábor Kornél Tolnai, 79, Hungarian-Swedish engineer and inventor

=== 4 ===
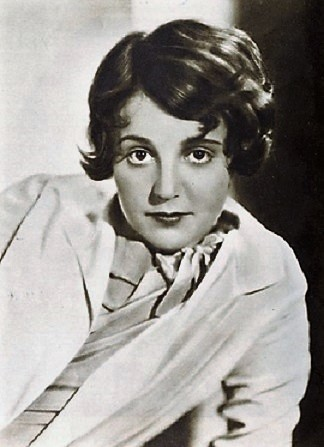
Sue Carol

- Sue Carol, 75, American actress
- Don DeMicheal, 53, American jazz percussionist, music journalist, and magazine editor
- Douglas Dodson, 60, American jockey who won the Eclipse Award
- Alex Harvey, 46, Scottish musician
- Moshe Menuhin, 88, Russian-born American Jewish writer and teacher of Hebrew
- Konrad Morgen, 72, German SS Investigating Judge and Reich Police Official
- Kathleen Scrymgour, 86, Australian hospital matron
- Anne Gillespie Shaw, 77, Scottish engineer and businesswoman
- Donald R. Smith, 55, American politician
- M. Srikantha, 68, Ceylon Tamil civil servant
- Marion Sims Wyeth, 92, American architect
- Kenichi Yamamoto, 56, a Japanese yakuza boss who founded the Yamaken-gumi

=== 5 ===
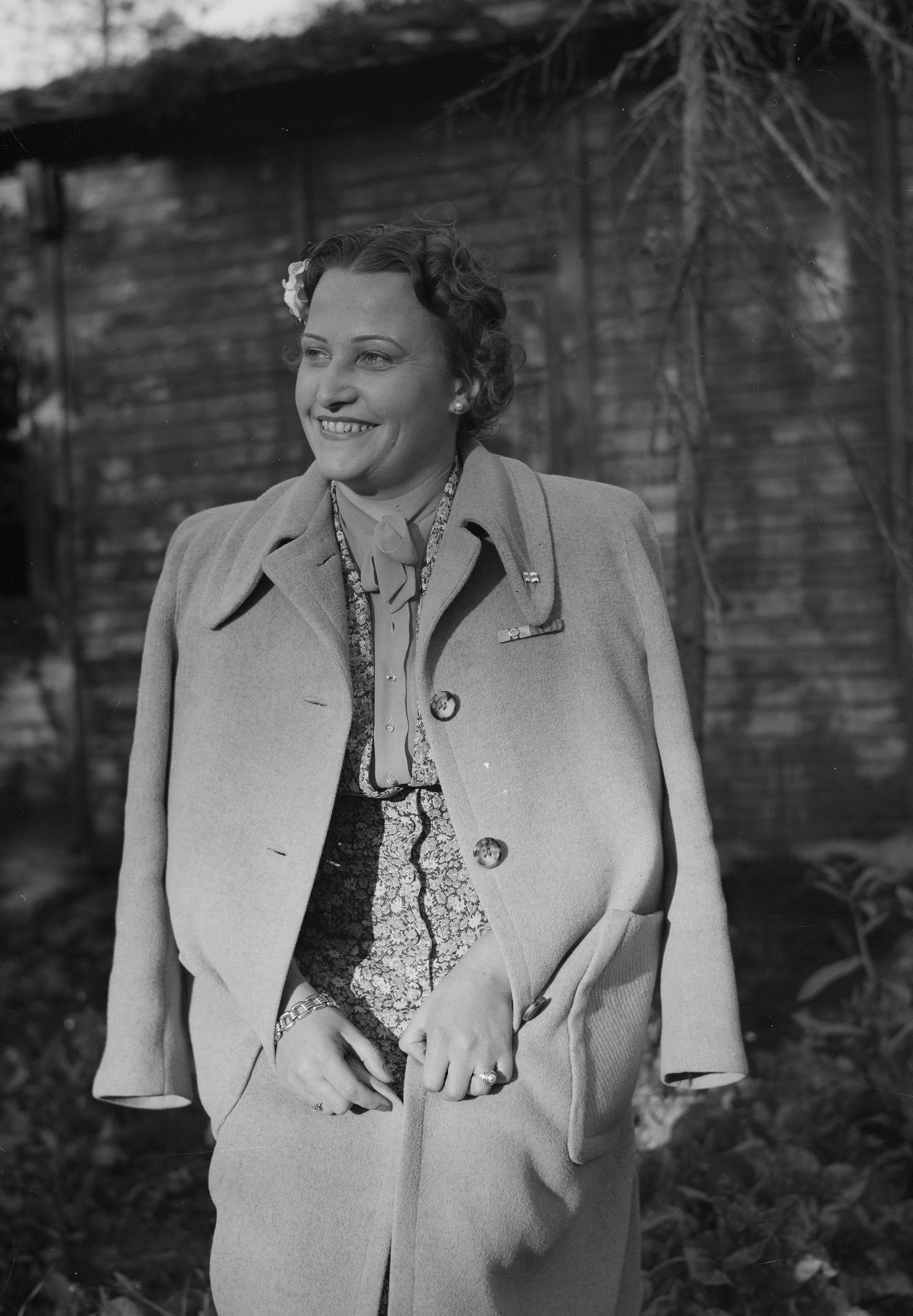
Lea Piltti

- Neil Aggett, 28, South African labor leader (suicide)
- Lindsay Beck, 81, Australian rules footballer
- Tadeusz Bielecki, 81, Polish politician and writer
- Riley Brett, 86, American racing driver
- George Crothers, 73, Irish cricketer
- Carl Oscar Hovind, 80, Norwegian chess player and writer
- Connie Lloyd, 86, New Zealand artist who specialised in etching
- Louis Marx, 85, American toy maker who founded Louis Marx and Company
- Wies Moens, 84, Belgian literary historian and poet
- Dolores Moran, 56, American actress and model
- Peter Opie, 63, English folklorist
- Lea Piltti, 78, Finnish soprano
- Klaus von Rautenfeld, 72, German cinematographer
- Grigory Mikhaylovich Shneyerov, 80, Russian musicologist, pianist, and conductor
- Niilo Tammisalo, 87, Finnish athlete

=== 6 ===
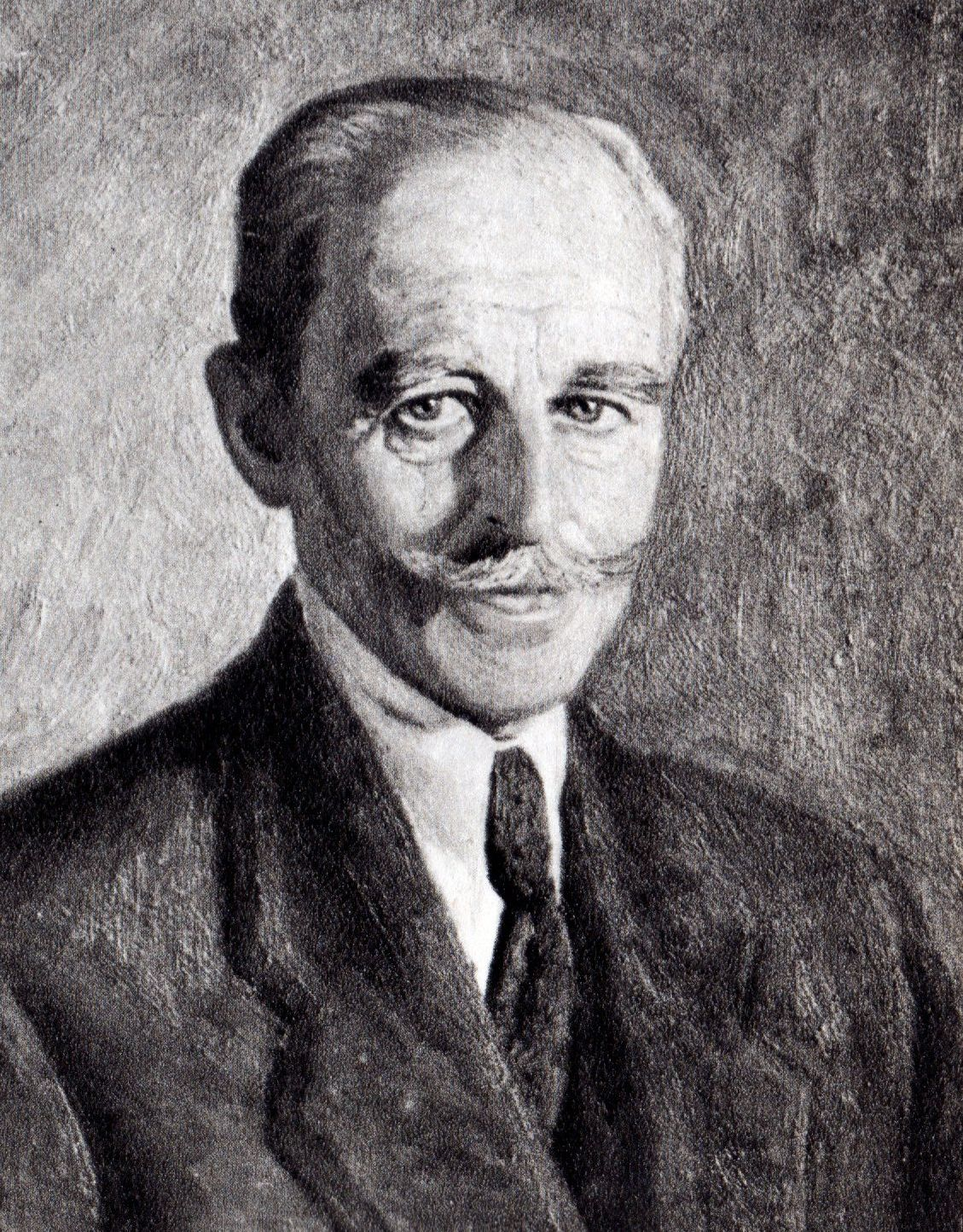
Władysław Dziewulski

- Kamruddin Ahmed, 69, Bangladeshi diplomat, lawyer and politician
- Ioan Beldiceanu, 89, Romanian brigadier general during World War II
- Gaspard Cyimana, 51, Rwandan statesman, industrialist, economist, and leader of independence who served as the 1st Minister of Finance of Rwanda
- Władysław Dziewulski, 83, Polish astronomer and mathematician
- Ben Nicholson, 87, English painter
- Frank Wilde, 70, British tennis and table tennis player

=== 7 ===
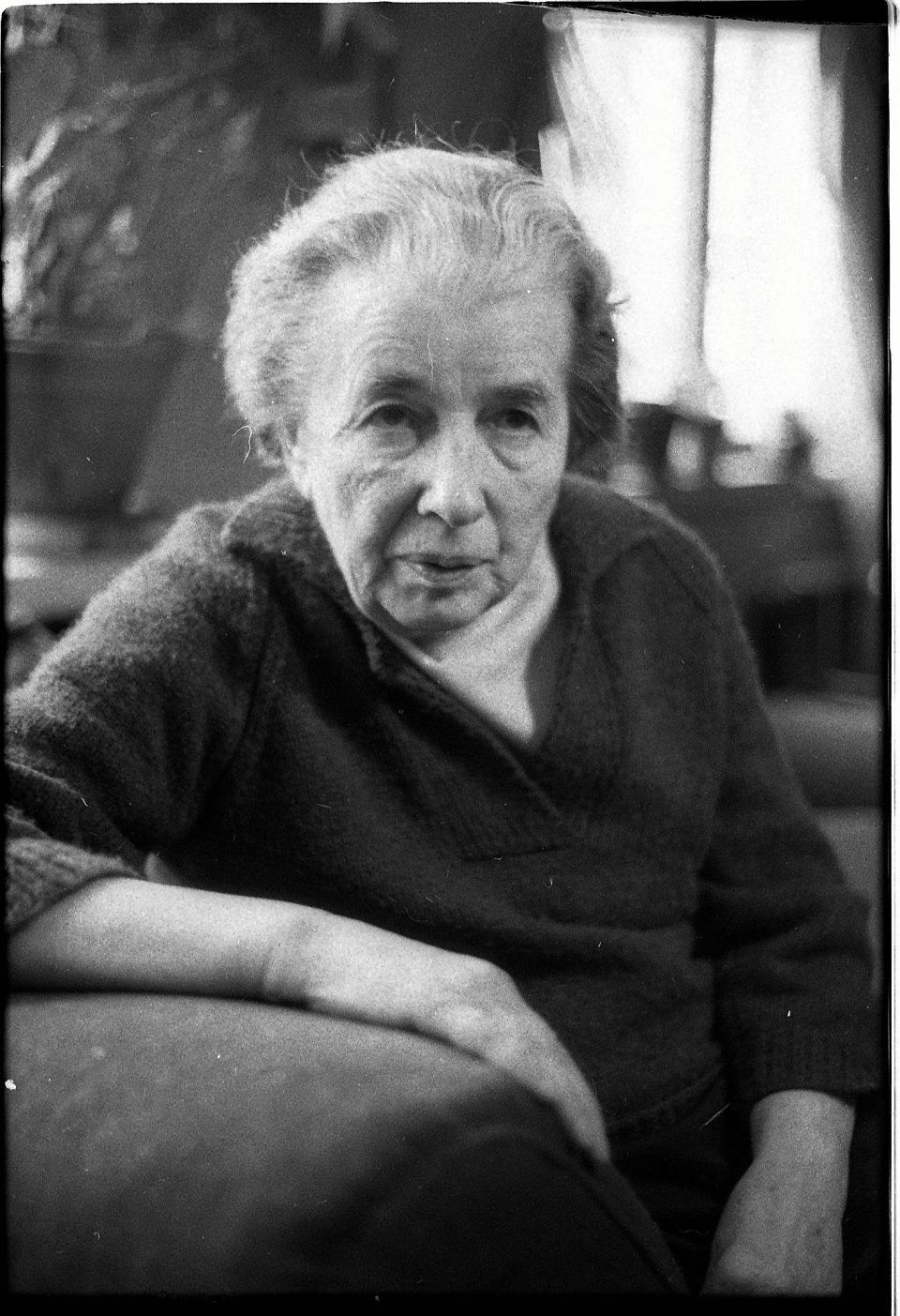
Irena Białówna

- Irena Białówna, 81, Polish politician, pediatrician, public health professional, and concentration camp survivor
- Thomas S. Boyland, 39, American politician from New York
- John D. Caemmerer, 54, American politician from New York
- Roy W. Chappell, 85, British World War I flying ace
- Al Culver, 73, American football player
- Nicholas Fernicola, 78, American politician from New Jersey
- John J. Gallagher, 77, American football and basketball player and coach
- Swami Karpatri, 74, Indian Hindu religious leader
- Frank McGurk, 66, racing driver
- John Metcalfe, 80, Australian librarian, educator and author

=== 8 ===
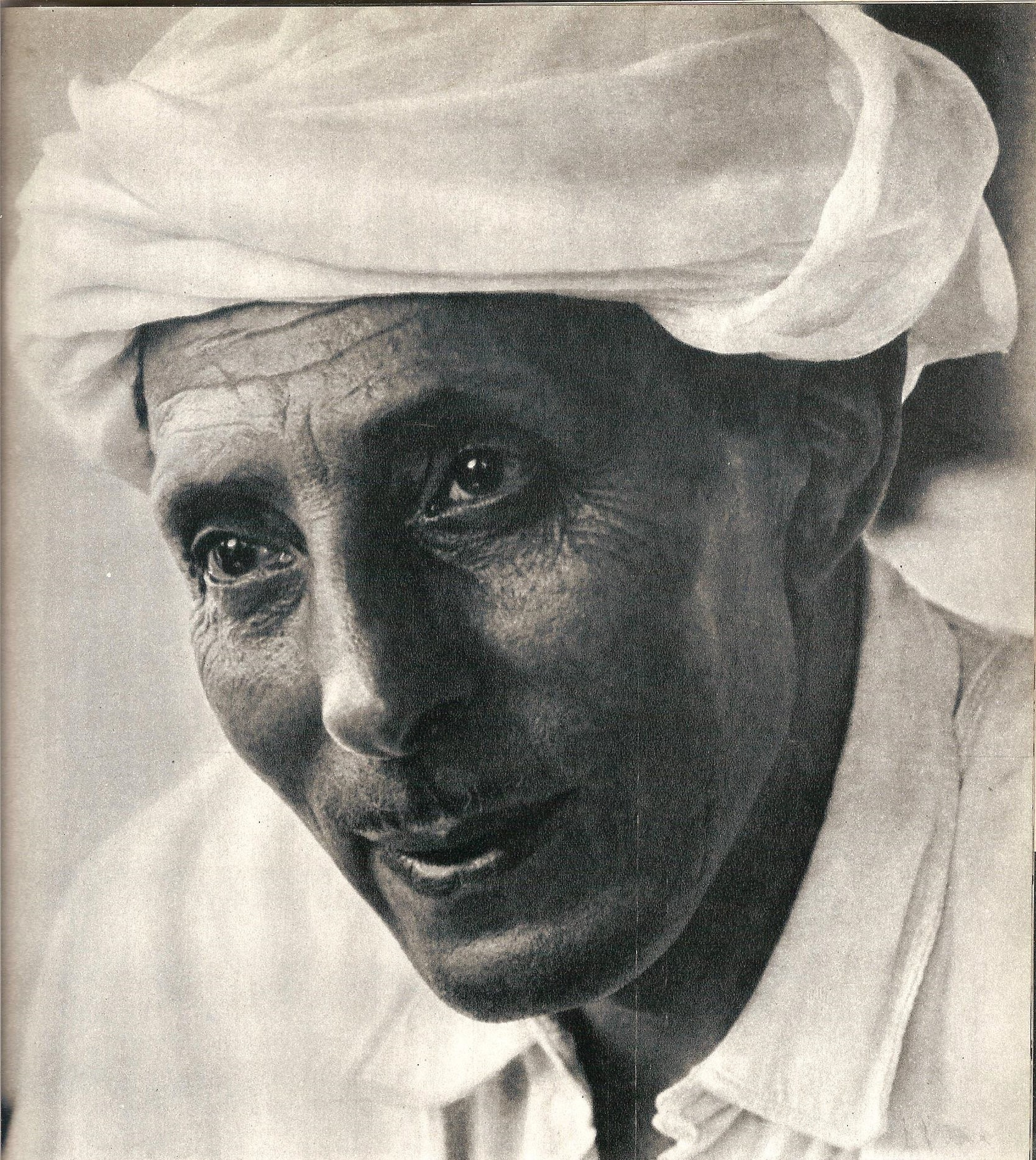
Said Boualam

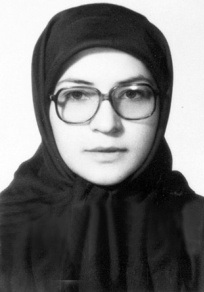
Ashraf Rabiei

- Saïd Boualam, 75, Algerian-French politician and military officer
- Albert Bourcier, 80, Canadian politician
- Kurt Edelhagen, 61, German big band leader
- Edwin Fullinwider, 81, American sabre fencer
- Werner Fürbringer, 93, German U-boat commander during World War I
- Johnny Jacobs, 65, American television announcer
- Jack Jennings, 63, American basketball player
- Mousa Khiabani, 34 or 35, Iranian dissident political leader
- Henry Sturgis Morgan, 81, American banker
- Cedric Morris, 92, British artist, art teacher and plantsman
- Ashraf Rabiei, 29 or 30, Iranian guerrilla and member of the People's Mojahedin of Iran
- Hermann Rauschning, 94, German politician and author
- Willy Rumpf, 78, German communist politician and Finance Minister in the German Democratic Republic
- Eddie Turchin, 64, American professional baseball infielder
- Jovan Veselinov, 76, Serbian communist politician
- Lauri Virtanen, 77, Finnish long-distance runner
- John Hay Whitney, 77, American venture capitalist, sportsman, philanthropist, newspaper publisher, film producer and diplomat
- Henry Drummond Wolff, 82, Basingstoke MP

=== 9 ===
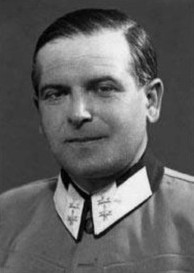
Marko Mesić

- Ivan Banov, 65, Soviet military intelligence officer and partisan movement leader in World War II
- Mary Eily de Putron, 67, Irish and Guernsey stained glass artist and archaeologist
- Gustav Joseph Mattli, 77, Swiss-born and London-based fashion designer
- Marko Mesić, 80, Croatian soldier
- Marthe Richard, 92, French prostitute, spy and politician

=== 10 ===
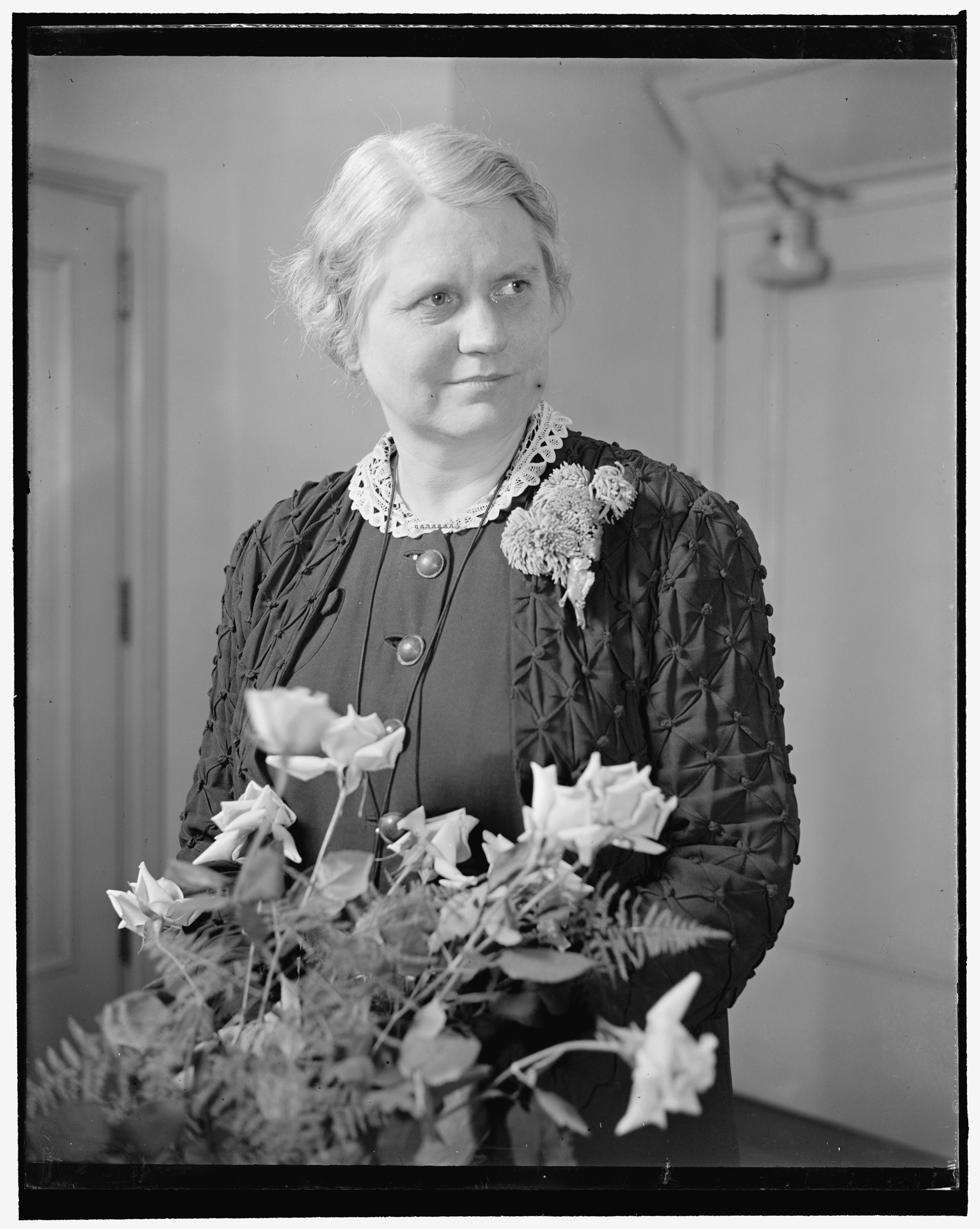
Katherine F. Lenroot

- Martin Crosbie, 70, Irish tenor
- Helen Dukas, 85, biographer of Albert Einstein who was also his secretary and archivist
- Françoise Henry, 79, French scholar of early Irish art, archaeologist, and art historian
- Loraine Leeson, 76, American birth control activist
- Katherine F. Lenroot, 90, American feminist and child welfare advocate, was the third Chief of the United States Children's Bureau
- Khershed Meherhomji, 70, Indian cricketer
- Rexho Mulliqi, 58, Albanian composer
- Michel Penha, 93, Dutch-born American cellist
- Margrit Rainer, 68, Swiss comedian, radio personality, and actress
- Edwin Reyno, 64, Royal Canadian Air Force air marshal
- Willy Riedel, 72, German Army officer of World War II
- Paul Samson, 76, thoracic and cardiac surgeon, medical school educator, and swimmer who competed in the Olympics
- Everett W. Stewart, 66, American flying ace of World War II

=== 11 ===
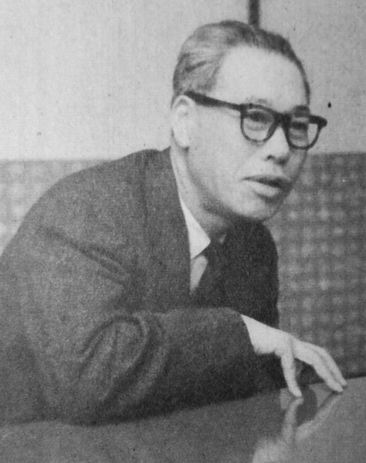
Takashi Shimura

- Allan Crabb, 58, Australian rules footballer
- Albert Facey, 87, Australian writer
- Annan Knudsen, 94, Norwegian sailor and rower
- Joel Laikka, 75, Finnish writer
- Erich Maschke, 81, German historian, history professor, and Nazi ideologue
- Eleanor Powell, 69, American dancer and actress
- Bennet Puryear Jr., 98, officer of the United States Marine Corps with the rank of major general
- Takashi Shimura, 76, Japanese actor
- Alfred Spinks, 64, British chemist and biologist

=== 12 ===
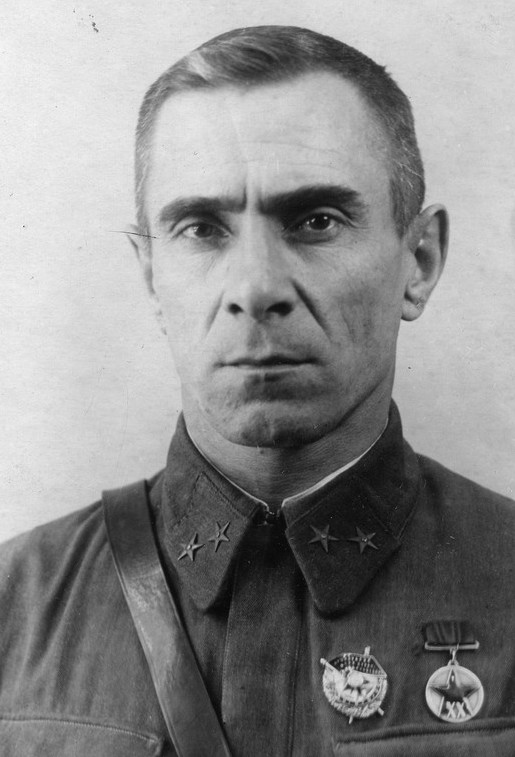
Nikolai Trufanov

- Dale Alderson, 63, baseball player
- V. T. Bhattathiripad, 85, Indian social reformer, dramatist and an Indian independence activist
- Geoffrey Bullough, 81, English literary scholar
- Elliot Carpenter, 87, American pianist, composer, arranger and writer
- Buck Grant, 87, Canadian ice hockey player
- Hal Hooker, 83, Australian first class cricketer
- Denis Jordan, 67, Anglo-Australian chemist and researcher
- Victor Jory, 79, Canadian-American actor
- Philip Livingston, 88, British physician and RAF officer
- Margaret Una Poché, 69 or 70, American educator and academic administrator
- Nikolai Trufanov, 81, Soviet Colonel General who fought in World War II
- Walter Wardle, 81, Archdeacon of Gloucester

=== 13 ===
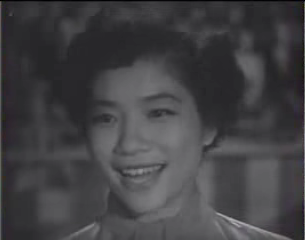
Chiemi Eri

- Marguerite Duparc, 48, Canadian film producer and editor
- Chiemi Eri, 45, Japanese singer and actress
- Zeng Jinlian, 17, Chinese girl who was at one time the tallest female on earth.
- Aleksandr Kasyanov, 90, composer and conductor
- Miriam Mandel, 51, Canadian poet
- James Miller, 37, American Roman Catholic missionary and martyr
- Giovanni Palmieri, 75, Italian tennis player
- J. Fred Scott, 89, Canadian military officer
- Fernando Valera Aparicio, 82, Spanish politician
- Paul Wahl, 75, German weightlifter

=== 14 ===
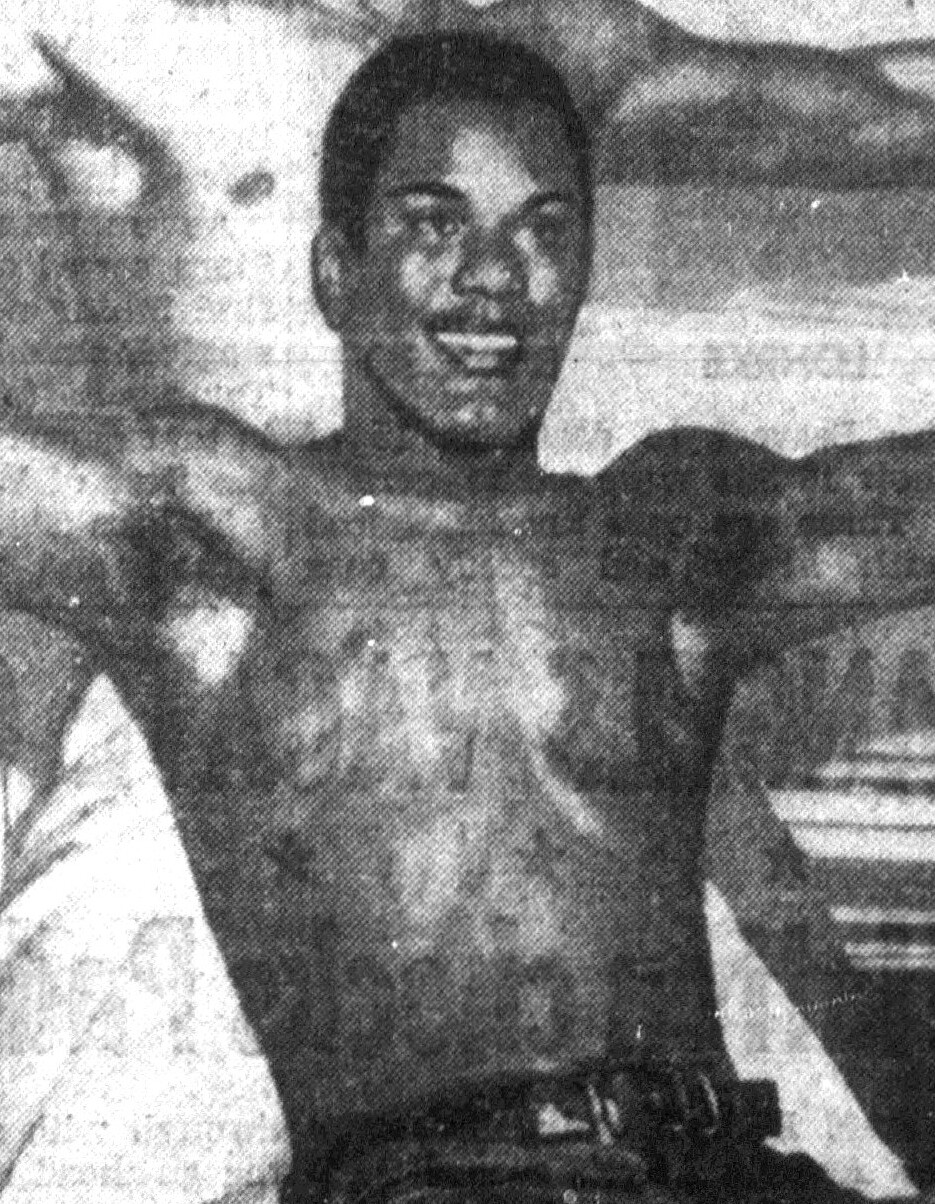
Tommy Jackson

- Gabriel Arout, 73, Russian-born French writer
- Antonio Casas, 70, Spanish footballer and actor
- Armand Cloutier, 80, Canadian politician
- Tommy Jackson, 50, American professional boxer
- Myra Smith Kearse, 82, American physician and community leader in New Jersey
- Thomas P. Kelley, 77, Canadian writer
- Marian Elizabeth Ridgeway, 68, American political scientist and academic
- Emma Toft, 91, American conservationist
- W. Lee Wilder, 77, Austrian-American screenwriter, film producer and director
- Rudolf Wöber, 70, Austrian long-distance runner

=== 15 ===
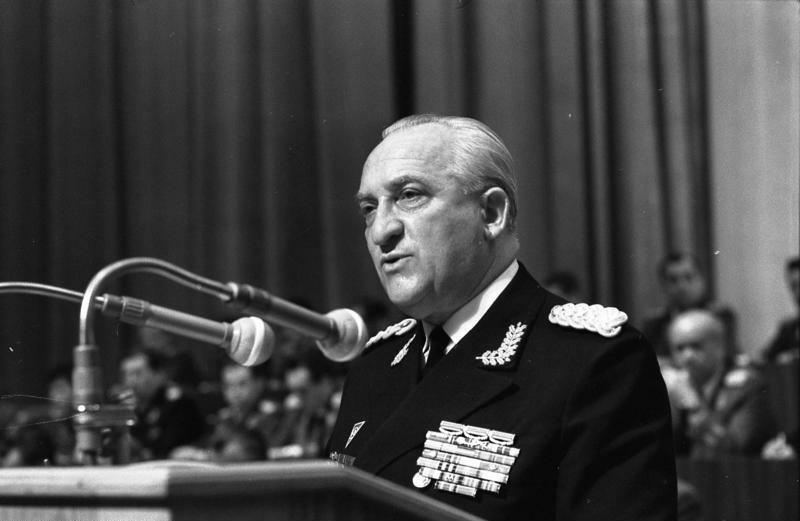
Waldemar Verner

- Noah Dietrich, 92, American businessman, who was the chief executive officer of the Howard Hughes business empire from 1925 to 1957
- Kurt Enoch, 86, German-born publisher who co-founded Albatross Books in Germany and Penguin Books Inc. and New American Library in the United States
- Charles Grove, 69, English first-class cricketer
- Kenneth Helfrich, 54, South African cricketer
- Richard B. Kershner, 68, American physicist and developer of satellite navigation systems
- Hamilton Mack Laing, 99, Canadian naturalist, writer, ornithologist, artist, photographer, taxidermist and hunter
- Paul H. Ramsey, 77, American naval officer
- Ralph Teetor, 91, American who invented cruise control
- Waldemar Verner, 67, chief of the People's Navy (Volksmarine) of the National People's Army
- Arthur Gillespie Wilson, 81, Australian Army officer

=== 16 ===
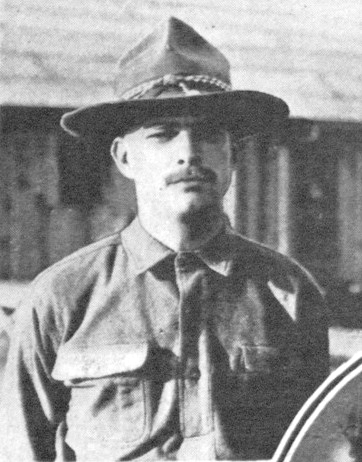
Nicholas Roosevelt

- Märta Blomstedt, 82, architect who was one of the driving forces of the Finnish functionalism movement
- Luis Pacheco de Céspedes, 86, Peruvian composer, violinist, and conductor
- Muhammad Enamul Haq, 79, Bangladeshi researcher, litterateur and educationist
- Jack Kiley, 53, American professional basketball player
- Christopher Masterman, 92, British civil servant and bureaucrat
- Nicholas Roosevelt, 88, American diplomat and journalist
- George Tanner, 67, Australian rules footballer
- Ronald Tinker, 68, New Zealand musterer, military leader, scientific administrator and sales agent
- Vivion de Valera, 71, Irish Fianna Fáil politician, businessman and lawyer
- Nathan Witt, 79, American lawyer who served as the Secretary of the National Labor Relations Board
- Andrej Žarnov, 76, Slovak Catholic modernist writer and physician

=== 17 ===
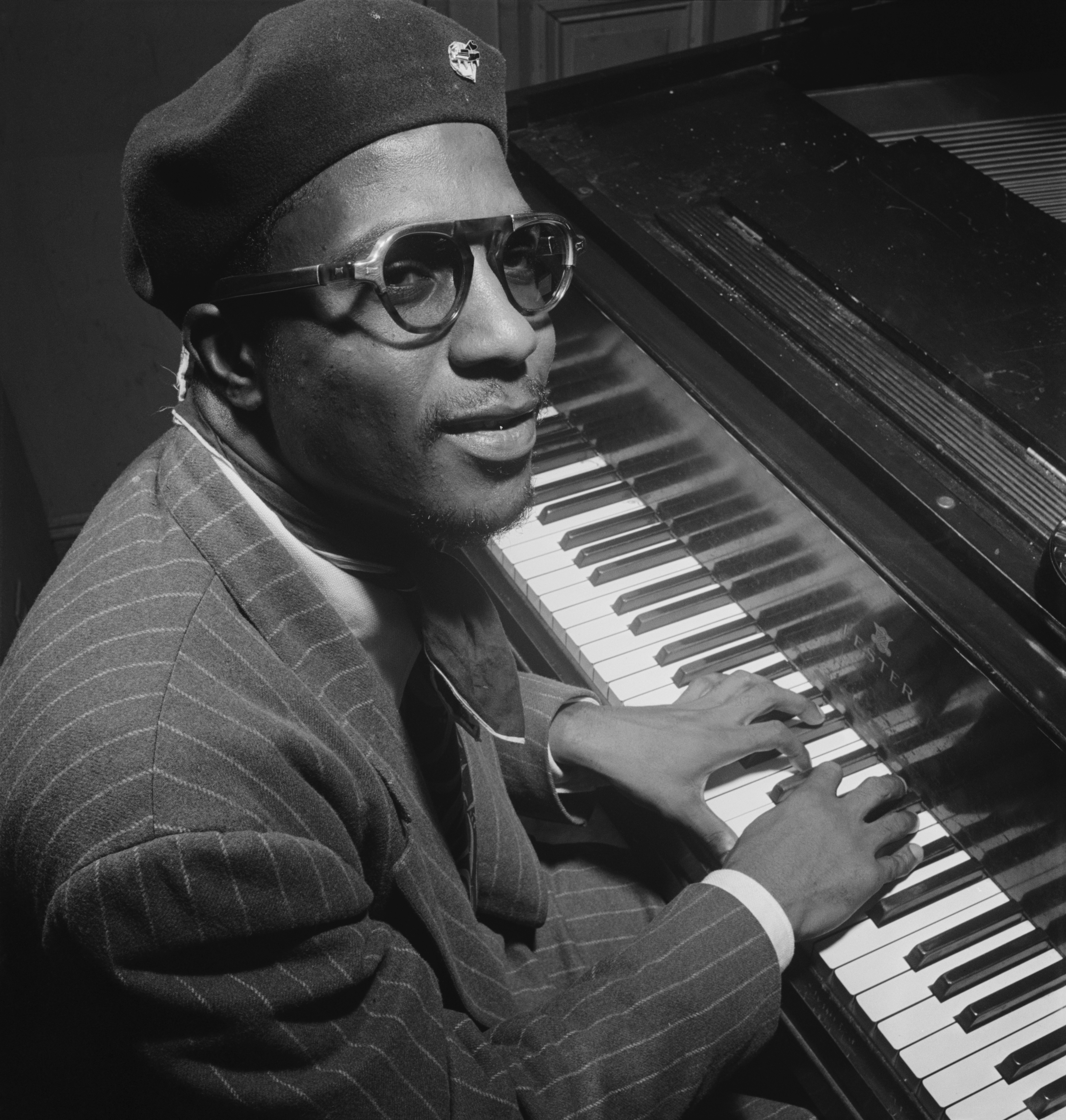
Thelonious Monk

- Jean Bolikango, 73, Congolese educator, writer, and politician
- Peter Cazalet, 82, Royal Navy officer
- Nestor Chylak, 59, American umpire in Major League Baseball
- Patrick A. Gleason, 47, Republican member of the Pennsylvania House of Representatives
- Thelonious Monk, 64, American jazz pianist
- Lee Strasberg, 80, Polish-American actor and acting coach, co-founder of method acting
- Heinrich Weidemann, 83, German art director
- Raymond M. Wheeler, 62, American physician and investigator of malnutrition

=== 18 ===
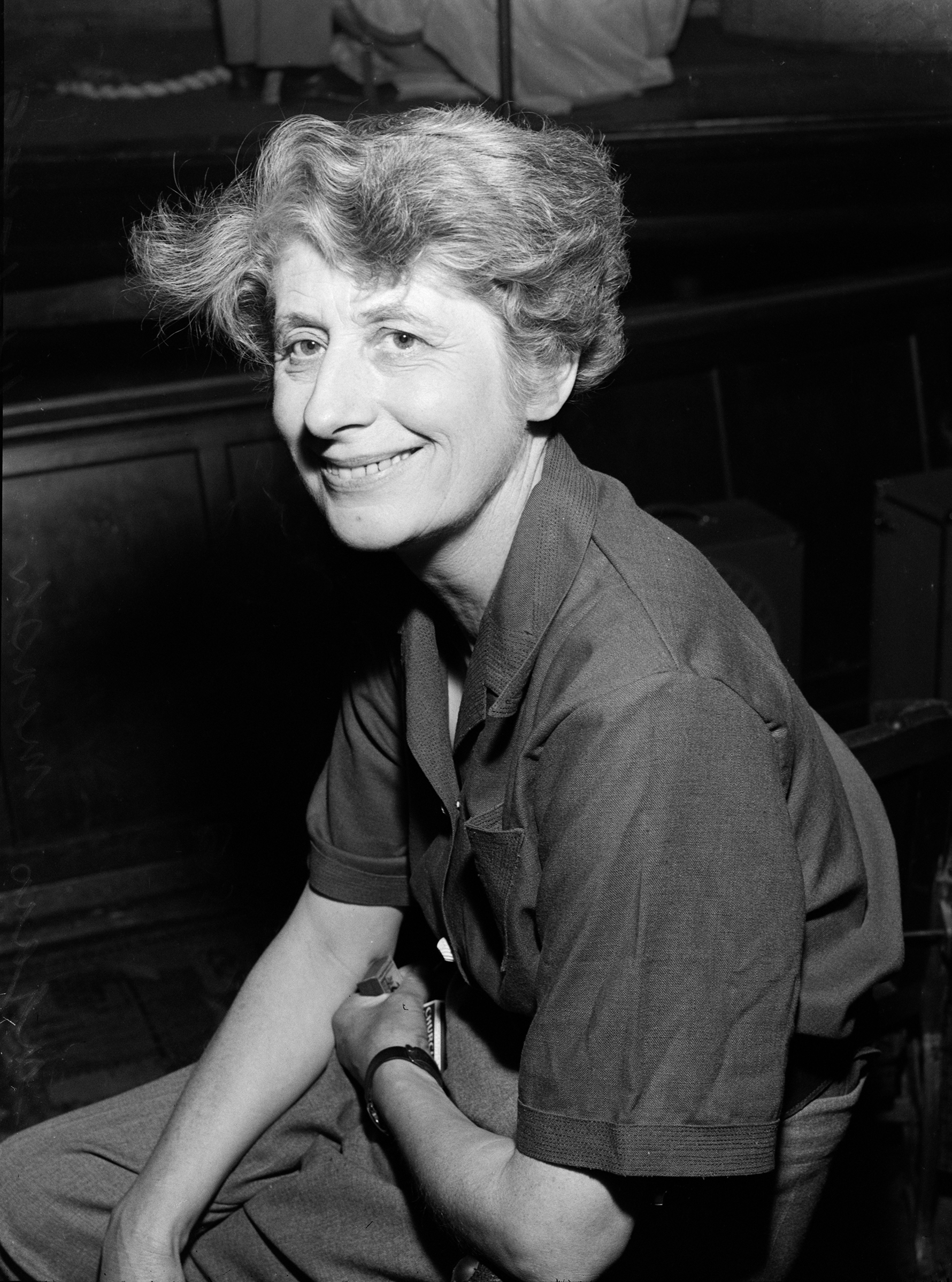
Ngaio Marsh

- Sol Babitz, 70, American musicologist and violinist
- Tina Carver, 58, American actress
- John Willie Kofi Harlley, 62, Vice Chairman of the National Liberation Council and the first Inspector General of Police in Ghana
- Dame Ngaio Marsh, 86, New Zealand crime fiction writer
- Anthony Mirra, 54, American mobster
- J. M. Robson, Belgian born British geneticist
- Nathaniel Shilkret, 92, American musician, composer, conductor and musical director

=== 19 ===
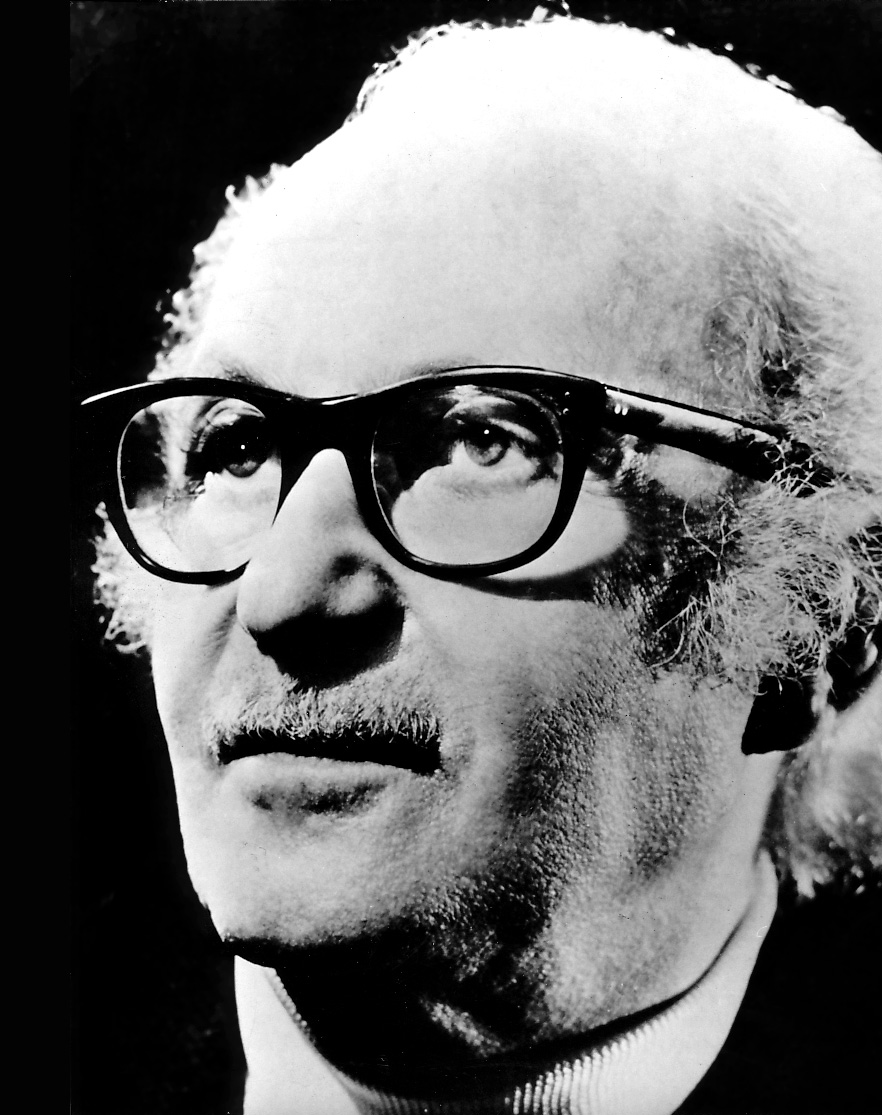
Lee Strasberg

- Arthur Akre, 75, American politician from South Dakota
- Ernest Falck, 74, English cricketer
- Celesta Geyer, 80, American circus performer who worked as a fat lady known as Dolly Dimples
- Alexander Gillies, 90, New Zealand orthopaedic surgeon
- Alberto Ezcurra Medrano, 72, Argentine historian and activist
- Dame Margery Perham, 86, English Africanist
- Jaakko Vuorinen, 58, Finnish fencer and Olympian

=== 20 ===
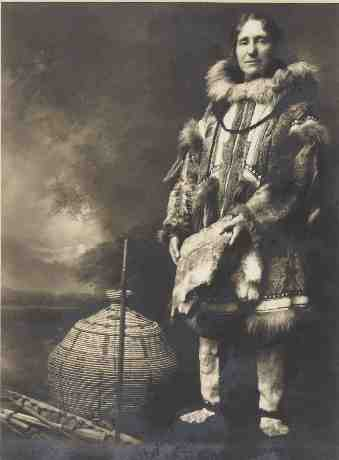
Isobel Wylie Hutchison

- Carl Björnstjerna, 95, Swedish equestrian, Olympian, and military officer
- Jim Bradley, 29, American basketball player
- René Dubos, 81, French-American microbiologist, experimental pathologist, environmentalist, humanist, and winner of the Pulitzer Prize for General Nonfiction
- Edward C. Franklin, 53, pioneering American immunologist and physician
- Stella McCarron, 68, American actress and dancer known in film under the name Frances Grant and on stage as Theo Phane. Under her married name Stella McCarron she ended her career as a celebrated dance teacher in Boston
- Helen Ruth Henderson, 83, American educator and politician from Virginia
- Alfhild Hovdan, 77, Norwegian journalist and tourist manager for the city of Oslo
- Derek Jackson, 75, British physicist
- Sholom Katz, 67, Jewish cantor and rabbi
- Isobel Wylie Hutchison, 92, Scottish Arctic traveller, filmmaker and botanist

=== 21 ===
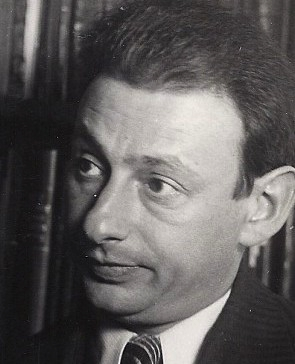
Gershom Scholem

- Alfred Bateson, 80, English international rugby union player
- Mischel Cherniavsky, 98, Russian cellist
- Tom Gentry, 66, American attorney and politician from Arkansas
- Murray the K, 60, New York City rock and roll impresario and disc jockey
- Robert Lowe Kunzig, 63, American attorney, HUAC counsel, and judge of the United States Court of Claims
- W. E. Shewell-Cooper, 81, British organic gardener and pioneer of no-dig gardening
- Gershom Scholem, 84, German-born Israeli Jewish philosopher and historian
- Ella V. Aldrich Schwing, 79, American librarian, professor, and pioneer of library user instruction
- Ray Shearer, 52, American professional baseball player

=== 22 ===
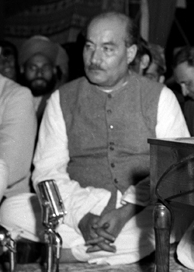
Josh Malihabadi

- Bill Armstrong, 72, Australian politician
- Bill Bain, 52, Australian television and film director
- Annie Barnes, 95, British-Italian socialist and suffragist
- John Carter, 74, American sound engineer who won an Academy Award
- Shelby A. Laxson, 69, American politician from Alabama
- Josh Malihabadi, 83, Indian born Pakistani Urdu poet
- Elden Rowland, 66, American painter
- Clare H. Timberlake, 74, American diplomat and career Foreign Service Officer

=== 23 ===
Herb Cain

- Robert Beauvais, 70, French writer and journalist
- Herb Cain, Canadian professional ice hockey left winger
- Zdzisław Karos, Polish police officer
- Elisabeth Kyle, 81, Scottish journalist and writer of novels, children's books and travel literature
- Fritz Oeser, 70, German musicologist and editor

=== 24 ===
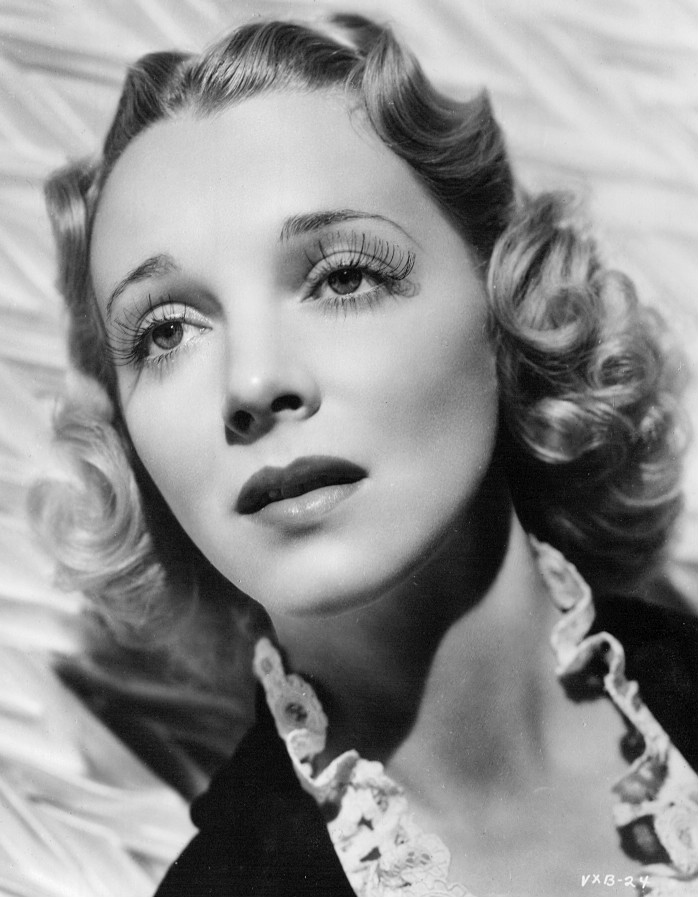
Virginia Bruce

- Virginia Bruce, 71, American actress
- Keith Henderson, 98, Scottish painter
- Lai Jifa, 71, Chinese politician
- Alma Lawton, 60, Argentine-born American actress
- Joseph Reinhardt, 69, French jazz guitarist
- Reb Spikes, 93, American jazz saxophonist and entrepreneur
- Oscar S. Stauffer, 95, founder of Stauffer Communications
- Lucien Tronchet, 79, Swiss anarcho-syndicalist activist

=== 25 ===
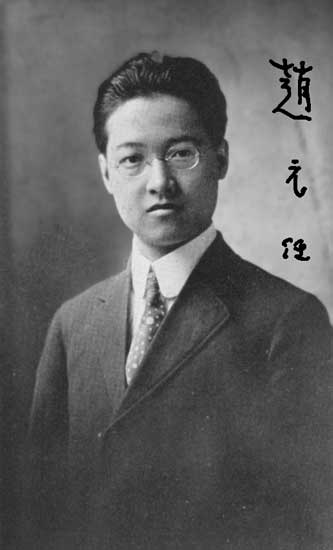
Yuen Ren Chao

- Mukhtar Begum, 80, Pakistani classical singer, composer, ghazal singer, dancer and actress
- Yuen Ren Chao, 89, Chinese-American linguist, educator, scholar, poet, and composer
- Ilse Fehling, 85, German costume designer
- Donald Hayworth, 84, American politician from Michigan
- Jenni Irani, 58, Indian cricketer
- Antoine Lox, 81, Belgian racing cyclist
- Hans-Joachim von Merkatz, 76, German politician
- Alan Rayson, 57, Australian rules footballer
- Jerry Sadler, 74, American politician from Texas
- Christian Schad, 87, German painter and photographer
- Piyasena Tennakoon, 64, Ceylonese lawyer and politician
- Robert Davidson Woodward, 72, American politician

=== 26 ===
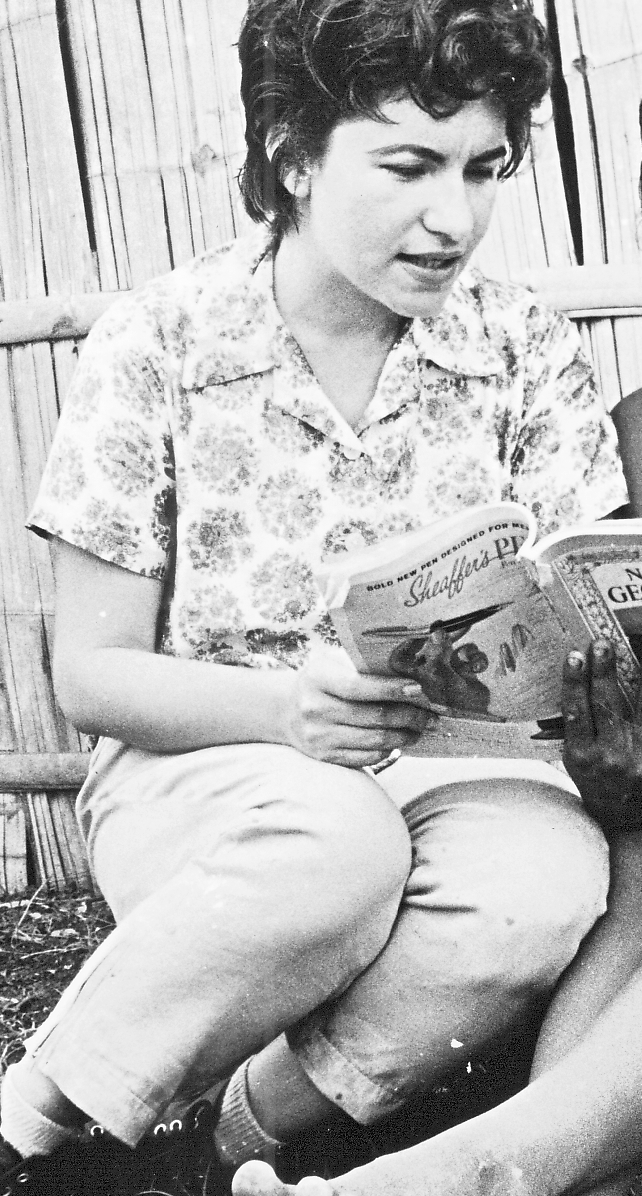
Reina Torres de Araúz

- Phyllis Reid Fenner, 82, American librarian, writer, anthologist, and storyteller
- Anders Jahre, 90, Norwegian shipping magnate and philanthropist
- Teinosuke Kinugasa, 86, Japanese actor and film maker
- Francisco Martínez Soria, 79, Spanish actor
- Gábor Szabó, 45, Hungarian-American guitarist
- Bill Miller, 71, American right-handed pitcher
- Robert Heatlie Scott, 76, British civil servant who became Permanent Secretary of the UK's Ministry of Defence
- Charles Sesher, 79, American college football coach
- Andrey Smirnov, 76, Soviet career diplomat
- Reina Torres de Araúz, 49, Panamanian anthropologist, ethnographer and professor

=== 27 ===
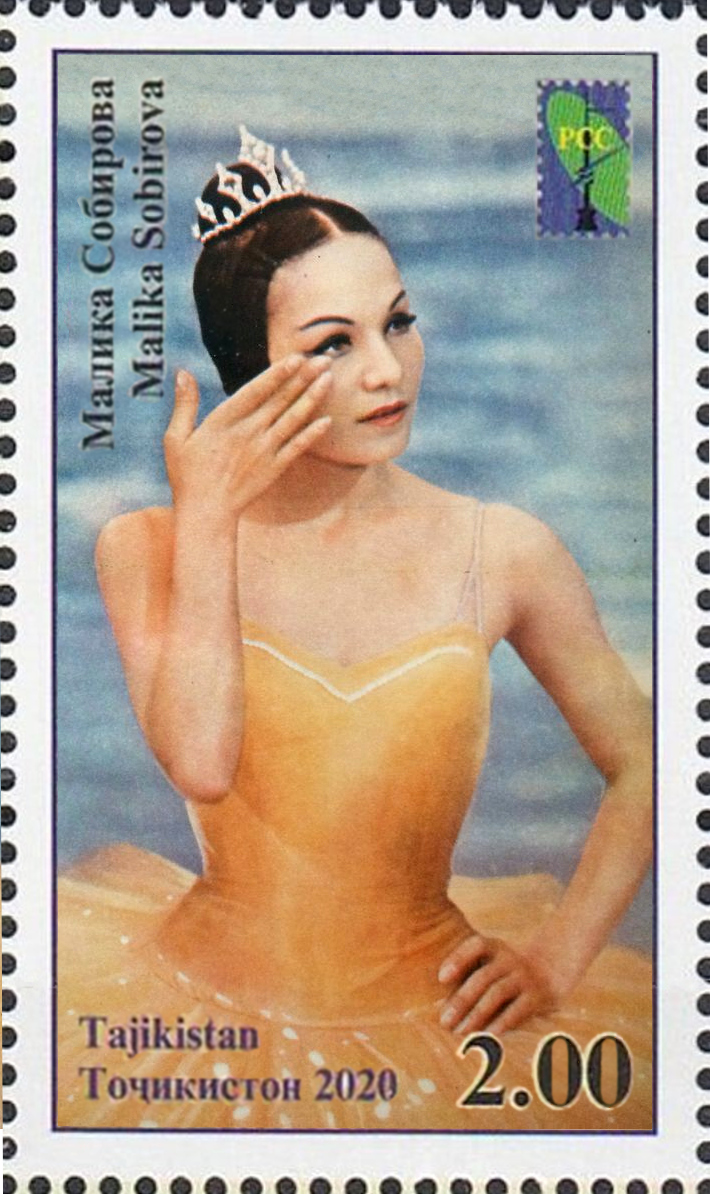
Malika Sobirova

- Ronald Bell, 67, British barrister and MP
- Maria Kownacka, 87, Polish writer, translator and editor, specializing in children's literature
- Malika Sobirova, 39, Soviet and Tajik ballet dancer and dance teacher
- Goh Soon Tioe, 70, Singaporean violinist

=== 28 ===
- Raghunath Singh Bahadur, 52, Maharawal of Jaisalmer
- Clyde Fenton, 80, Australian emergency physician
- Ellis Morningstar, 80, Canadian politician
- Rollin G. Osterweis, 74, American historian
- Roy Sherid, 75, American professional baseball pitcher
- Alan Skinner, 68, English cricketer
- Shemuel Yeivin, 85, Israeli archaeologist and the first director of the Israel Antiquities Authority
- Nathan A. Zepell, 67, Latvian-born American Jewish inventor and Holocaust survivor
