= Vuorinen =

Vuorinen is a Finnish surname.

== Geographical distribution ==
As of 2014, 93.9% of all known bearers of the surname Vuorinen were residents of Finland (frequency 1:795), 2.1% of Sweden (1:63,527), and 1.6% of Estonia (1:11,106).

In Finland, the frequency of the surname was higher than national average (1:795) in the following regions:

1. Tavastia Proper (1:358)
2. Southwest Finland (1:392)
3. Pirkanmaa (1:418)
4. Satakunta (1:562)
5. Päijänne Tavastia (1:625)
6. Central Finland (1:763)
7. Uusimaa (1:776)

== People ==
- Kalle Vuorinen (1851–1929), Finnish farmer and politician
- Jaakko Vuorinen (1923–1982), Finnish fencer
- Matti Vuorinen (born 1948), Finnish mathematician and writer
- Petri Vuorinen (born 1972), Finnish football manager
- Emppu Vuorinen (born 1978), Finnish guitarist
- Hermanni Vuorinen (born 1985), Finnish footballer
