= Kirei Zhumagazin =

Kirei Zhumagazin (born 1929) is a Soviet Kazakh-born Tajik sculptor. Born in the Aktobe Region, Kazakhstan, he relocated to Dushanbe, Tajikistan in 1952. He learned sculpture from Elena Alekseevna Tatarinova and first exhibited his artwork in 1962. It includes sculptures of poet Mirzo Tursunzoda and ballet dancer Malika Sobirova.
