= Sincock =

Sincock is a surname. Notable people with the surname include:

- Andrew Sincock OAM (born 1951), former first-class cricketer
- Bert Sincock (1887–1946), left-handed pitcher in Major League Baseball
- David Sincock (born 1942), former Australian cricketer
- Harrold Sincock (1907–1982), Australian cricketer
- Peter Sincock (born 1948), Australian cricketer
- Russell Sincock (born 1947), Australian former cricketer
