= Charles Sesher =

American football coach (1902–1982)

Biographical details
- Born: November 2, 1902; Cherokee, Kansas, U.S.
- Died: February 26, 1982 (aged 79); Hutchinson, Kansas, U.S.
- Education: Kansas State Teachers College of Pittsburg (1925)

Playing career

Football
- 1921–1924: Pittsburg State

Basketball
- 1922–1925: Pittsburg State
- Positions: Quarterback (football); Forward (basketball)

Coaching career (HC unless noted)

Football
- 1925: Sedan HS (KS)
- 1926–1929: Cherokee HS (KS)
- 1930–1953: Hutchinson

Basketball
- 1925–1926: Sedan HS (KS)
- 1926–1930: Cherokee HS (KS)
- 1930–1957: Hutchinson

Track and field
- 1926: Sedan HS (KS)
- 1927–1930: Cherokee HS (KS)
- 1931–1954: Hutchinson

Administrative career (AD unless noted)
- 1925–1926: Sedan HS (KS)
- 1926–1930: Cherokee HS (KS)
- 1955–1967: Hutchinson

Head coaching record
- Overall: 115–58–14 (junior college football); 259–151 (junior college basketball); 19–15–1 (high school football; excluding Sedan)
- Bowls: 2–1–2
- Tournaments: Basketball; 6–2 (NJCAA)

Accomplishments and honors

Championships
- Football; 2 KPJCA (1932, 1947); 3 KPJCA West Division (1948–1950); Basketball; 4 KPJCA (1933, 1939–1940, 1947)

Charles Elmo Sesher (November 2, 1902 – February 26, 1982) was an American college football coach. He was the head football coach for Sedan High School in 1925, Cherokee High School from 1926 to 1929, and Hutchinson Community College from 1930 to 1953. For all three schools he also coached basketball and track and field.

From 1949 to 1964, Sesher served as Vice President for the NJCAA. During this time Sesher was instrumental in bringing the NJCAA Division I Basketball Championship to Hutchinson, KS where it has been played since 1949.

From 1955 to 1967, Sesher served as athletic director for Hutchinson.

== Head coaching record ==
=== Junior college football ===
| Year | Team | Overall | Conference | Standing | Bowl/playoffs |
|---|---|---|---|---|---|
Hutchinson Blue Dragons (Kansas Public Junior College Association) (1930–1953)
| 1930 | Hutchinson | 5–3 | 3–3 | 3rd | |
| 1931 | Hutchinson | 6–2 | 4–2 | 2nd | |
| 1932 | Hutchinson | 4–1–3 | 3–0–2 | T–1st | |
| 1933 | Hutchinson | 4–3–2 | 2–3 | 4th | |
| 1934 | Hutchinson | 5–4–1 | 3–2–1 | T–2nd | |
| 1935 | Hutchinson | 5–4–1 | 2–3–1 | 5th | |
| 1936 | Hutchinson | 8–2 | 6–2 | 2nd | |
| 1937 | Hutchinson | 4–5 | 3–5 | 5th | |
| 1938 | Hutchinson | 5–2–1 | 4–2–1 | 3rd | |
| 1939 | Hutchinson | 5–2–1 | 4–2–1 | 3rd | |
| 1940 | Hutchinson | 3–4–1 | 3–4–1 | 5th | |
| 1941 | Hutchinson | 3–4 | 2–4 | T–7th | |
| 1942 | Hutchinson | 3–3 | 2–2 | 4th | |
| 1943 | No team—World War II | | | | |
| 1944 | No team—World War II | | | | |
| 1945 | No team—World War II | | | | |
| 1946 | Hutchinson | 7–2 | 6–1 | 2nd | |
| 1947 | Hutchinson | 10–0 | 8–0 | 1st | W Salt Bowl |
| 1948 | Hutchinson | 10–1–1 | 5–0 | 1st (West) | T Wheat Bowl, L Texas Rose Bowl |
| 1949 | Hutchinson | 8–3–1 | 5–0 | 1st (West) | T Wheat Bowl, W Salt Bowl |
| 1950 | Hutchinson | 7–2 | 4–1 | T–1st (West) | |
| 1951 | Hutchinson | 3–4–1 | 3–1 | 2nd (West) | |
| 1952 | Hutchinson | 5–3–1 | 3–1–1 | 2nd | |
| 1953 | Hutchinson | 5–4 | 4–2 | 3rd | |
| Hutchinson: | | 115–58–14 | 78–40–8 | | |
| Total: | | 115–58–14 | | | |
National championship Conference title Conference division title or championship game berth

=== Junior college basketball ===
Record table
| Season | Team | Overall | Conference | Standing | Postseason |
|---|---|---|---|---|---|
Hutchinson Blue Dragons (Kansas Public Junior College Association) (1930–1957)
| 1930–31 | Hutchinson | 9–5 | 7–4 | 3rd | |
| 1931–32 | Hutchinson | 7–6 | 6–5 | 4th | |
| 1932–33 | Hutchinson | 14–1 | 11–1 | 1st | |
| 1933–34 | Hutchinson | 5–10 | 2–10 | 7th | |
| 1934–35 | Hutchinson | 3–10 | 1–9 | 7th | |
| 1935–36 | Hutchinson | 9–6 | 6–7 | 5th | |
| 1936–37 | Hutchinson | 7–6 | 7–5 | 3rd | |
| 1937–38 | Hutchinson | 11–3 | 5–3 | 2nd | |
| 1938–39 | Hutchinson | 17–2 | 10–0 | 1st | |
| 1939–40 | Hutchinson | 15–2 | 8–2 | T–1st | |
| 1940–41 | Hutchinson | 10–3 | 7–3 | 3rd | |
| 1941–42 | Hutchinson | 11–4 | 6–4 | 2nd | |
| 1942–43 | Hutchinson | 8–4 | 4–2 | 2nd | |
| 1943–44 | No team—World War II | | | | |
| 1944–45 | No team—World War II | | | | |
| 1945–46 | No team—World War II | | | | |
| 1946–47 | Hutchinson | 11–5 | 9–1 | 1st | |
| 1947–48 | Hutchinson | 9–6 | 5–5 | 4th | |
| 1948–49 | Hutchinson | 13–9 | 4–6 | 4th | NJCAA Runner-up |
| 1949–50 | Hutchinson | 14–6 | 7–3 | 2nd | |
| 1950–51 | Hutchinson | 11–10 | 7–3 | T–2nd | |
| 1951–52 | Hutchinson | 5–12 | 3–7 | 5th | |
| 1952–53 | Hutchinson | 8–12 | 2–8 | 6th | |
| 1953–54 | Hutchinson | 11–7 | 5–5 | 3rd | |
| 1954–55 | Hutchinson | 15–7 | 5–5 | 3rd | |
| 1955–56 | Hutchinson | 15–8 | 7–3 | 2nd | |
| 1956–57 | Hutchinson | 21–7 | 8–2 | 2nd | NJCAA First Round |
| Hutchinson: | | 259–151 | 142–103 | | |
| Total: | | 259–151 | | | |
National champion Postseason invitational champion Conference regular season champion Conference regular season and conference tournament champion Division regular season champion Division regular season and conference tournament champion Conference tournament champion

=== High school football ===
| Year | Team | Overall | Conference | Standing | Bowl/playoffs |
|---|---|---|---|---|---|
Sedan Blue Devils () (1925)
| 1925 | Sedan | | | | |
| Sedan: | | | | | |
Cherokee Braves (Southeast Kansas League) (1926–1927)
| 1926 | Cherokee | 4–5 | | | |
| 1927 | Cherokee | 2–7 | | | |
Cherokee Braves (Independent) (1928)
| 1928 | Cherokee | 5–3 | | | |
Cherokee Braves (Mineral Belt League) (1929)
| 1929 | Cherokee | 8–0–1 | | 1st | |
| Cherokee: | | 19–15–1 | | | |
| Total: | | | | | |
National championship Conference title Conference division title or championship game berth
