= Chautauqua, Kansas =

City in Chautauqua County, Kansas, US

- City
- Location within Chautauqua County and Kansas

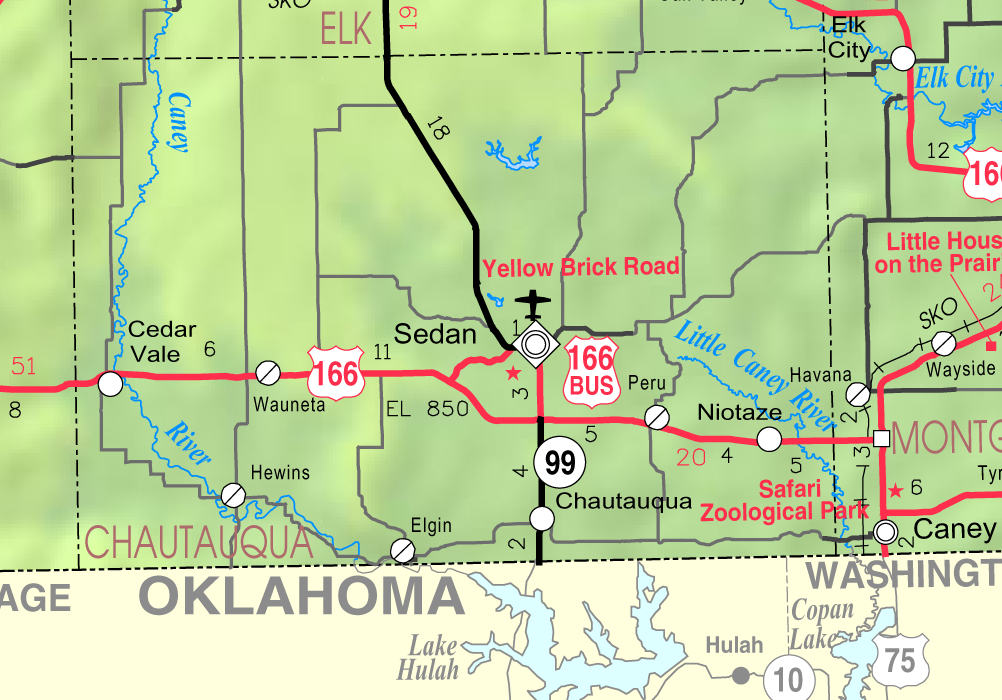
- KDOT map of Chautauqua County (legend)
- Coordinates: 37°01′27″N 96°10′39″W
- Country: United States
- State: Kansas
- County: Chautauqua
- Founded: 1881
- Incorporated: 1882

Area
  - Total: 0.42 sq mi (1.10 km^{2})
  - Land: 0.42 sq mi (1.10 km^{2})
  - Water: 0 sq mi (0.00 km^{2})
- Elevation: 909 ft (277 m)

Population (2020)
  - Total: 108
  - Density: 254/sq mi (98.2/km^{2})
- Time zone: UTC-6 (CST)
  - Summer (DST): UTC-5 (CDT)
- ZIP Code: 67334
- Area code: 620
- FIPS code: 20-12675
- GNIS ID: 2393812

Chautauqua is a city in Chautauqua County, Kansas, United States. As of the 2020 census, the population of the city was 108.

== History ==
Chautauqua was founded in 1881, and it was incorporated in 1882.

== Geography ==
According to the United States Census Bureau, the city has a total area of 0.43 square miles (1.11 km^{2}), all of it land.

=== Climate ===
The climate in this area is characterized by hot, humid summers and generally mild to cool winters. According to the Köppen Climate Classification system, Chautauqua has a humid subtropical climate, abbreviated "Cfa" on climate maps.

== Demographics ==
Historical population
Census	Pop.	Note	%±
1910	348		—
1920	401		15.2%
1930	282		−29.7%
1940	254		−9.9%
1950	215		−15.4%
1960	205		−4.7%
1970	137		−33.2%
1980	156		13.9%
1990	130		−16.7%
2000	113		−13.1%
2010	111		−1.8%
2020	108		−2.7%
U.S. Decennial Census

=== 2020 census ===
The 2020 United States census counted 108 people, 45 households, and 31 families in Chautauqua. The population density was 254.7 per square mile (98.3/km^{2}). There were 55 housing units at an average density of 129.7 per square mile (50.1/km^{2}). The racial makeup was 77.78% (84) white or European American (77.78% non-Hispanic white), 0.0% (0) black or African-American, 1.85% (2) Native American or Alaska Native, 2.78% (3) Asian, 0.0% (0) Pacific Islander or Native Hawaiian, 1.85% (2) from other races, and 15.74% (17) from two or more races. Hispanic or Latino of any race was 4.63% (5) of the population.

Of the 45 households, 24.4% had children under the age of 18; 46.7% were married couples living together; 35.6% had a female householder with no spouse or partner present. 24.4% of households consisted of individuals and 13.3% had someone living alone who was 65 years of age or older. The average household size was 2.3 and the average family size was 2.6. The percent of those with a bachelor's degree or higher was estimated to be 7.4% of the population.

28.7% of the population was under the age of 18, 0.9% from 18 to 24, 18.5% from 25 to 44, 27.8% from 45 to 64, and 24.1% who were 65 years of age or older. The median age was 48.0 years. For every 100 females, there were 92.9 males. For every 100 females ages 18 and older, there were 120.0 males.

The 2016–2020 5-year American Community Survey estimates show that the median household income was $32,500 (with a margin of error of +/- $13,024) and the median family income was $50,833 (+/- $34,712).

=== 2010 census ===
As of the census of 2010, there were 111 people, 52 households, and 33 families residing in the city. The population density was 258.1 inhabitants per square mile (99.7/km^{2}). There were 72 housing units at an average density of 167.4 per square mile (64.6/km^{2}). The racial makeup of the city was 87.4% White, 3.6% Native American, 0.9% Asian, and 8.1% from two or more races. Hispanic or Latino of any race were 0.9% of the population.

There were 52 households, of which 23.1% had children under the age of 18 living with them, 44.2% were married couples living together, 7.7% had a female householder with no husband present, 11.5% had a male householder with no wife present, and 36.5% were non-families. 34.6% of all households were made up of individuals, and 15.3% had someone living alone who was 65 years of age or older. The average household size was 2.13 and the average family size was 2.58.

The median age in the city was 48.2 years. 16.2% of residents were under the age of 18; 9% were between the ages of 18 and 24; 17.1% were from 25 to 44; 32.4% were from 45 to 64; and 25.2% were 65 years of age or older. The gender makeup of the city was 48.6% male and 51.4% female.

=== 2000 census ===
As of the census of 2000, there were 113 people, 53 households, and 29 families residing in the city. The population density was 265.4 inhabitants per square mile (102.5/km^{2}). There were 72 housing units at an average density of 169.1 per square mile (65.3/km^{2}). The racial makeup of the city was 89.38% White, 7.08% Native American, and 3.54% from two or more races.

There were 53 households, out of which 22.6% had children under the age of 18 living with them, 39.6% were married couples living together, 15.1% had a female householder with no husband present, and 43.4% were non-families. 43.4% of all households were made up of individuals, and 22.6% had someone living alone who was 65 years of age or older. The average household size was 2.13 and the average family size was 2.97.

In the city, the population was spread out, with 24.8% under the age of 18, 8.0% from 18 to 24, 19.5% from 25 to 44, 24.8% from 45 to 64, and 23.0% who were 65 years of age or older. The median age was 42 years. For every 100 females, there were 79.4 males. For every 100 females age 18 and over, there were 88.9 males.

The median income for a household in the city was $18,500, and the median income for a family was $19,583. Males had a median income of $31,250 versus $15,750 for females. The per capita income for the city was $9,781. There were 27.3% of families and 38.5% of the population living below the poverty line, including 65.7% of under eighteens and 13.8% of those over 64.

== Education ==
The community is served by Chautauqua County USD 286 public school district, and its Sedan Jr/Sr High School is located in Sedan.

Chautauqua High School was closed through school unification. Chautauqua High School won the Kansas State High School boys class B basketball championship in 1927.
