= Kalle Vuorinen =

Finnish politician

Kalle Heikki Vuorinen (30 December 1851, in Urjala – 26 May 1929) was a Finnish farmer and politician. He was a Member of the Parliament of Finland from 1912 to 1913.
