= Ernest Falck =

English cricketer

- Falck in 1936

Personal information
- Full name: Ernest Dyson Falck
- Born: 21 October 1907; Huddersfield, West Yorkshire, England
- Died: 19 February 1982 (aged 74); Bridport, Dorset, England
- Batting: Right-handed
- Bowling: Unknown

Domestic team information
- Years: Team
- 1935–1936: Somerset
- First-class debut: 17 July 1935 Somerset v Worcestershire
- Last First-class: 2 June 1936 Somerset v Gloucestershire

Career statistics
Competition	First-class
Matches	4
Runs scored	74
Batting average	10.57
100s/50s	0/0
Top score	28
Catches/stumpings	2/0
- Source: CricketArchive, 21 January 2011

Ernest Dyson Falck (21 October 1907 – 19 February 1982) was an English amateur cricketer who played for Somerset County Cricket Club in the 1930s. A prolific all-rounder in club cricket, first in his native Yorkshire, and later for Wells City in Somerset, Falck was selected by Somerset to play in four first-class cricket matches for the county across 1935 and 1936. Although he was Somerset's highest-scoring batsman on a difficult pitch on his debut, he never replicated his club success with Somerset, and ended his county cricket career with 74 runs at an average of 10.57, having never bowled for the county.

He had a successful career in the family business producing sausage casings, and later diversifying into drug production as a sub-contractor to Glaxo. Falck was an all-round sportsman, having also played for Wells City F.C., and taking up golf in later life. He retired to Bridport in Dorset, where he died in 1982.

== Personal life and business career ==
Ernest Dyson Falck was born in Huddersfield, West Yorkshire on 21 October 1907, the eighth child of John Henry Falck and Emily (née Brook). He grew up in Huddersfield, and at the age of 14, left school and joined his father's business, J. H. Falck and Sons, which produced sausage casings at a factory in the city. During his early twenties, he fractured his skull when he fell off a ladder, leaving him bald for the rest of his life. He married Margery Gledhill in 1932, and the couple had two children, Garry and Neil. In late 1933, he expanded the business into south-west England, acquiring a factory on South Street in Wells, Somerset, where he moved. During the Second World War, Falck was fined for buying black market bacon and ham, but the business was successful, and after the war sub-contracted to Glaxo in the production of the anti-coagulant drug heparin. Falck passed the business on to his sons upon his retirement, and moved to Bridport in Dorset, where he died on 19 February 1982.

== Cricket career ==
Falck began playing club cricket as a teenager in Huddersfield, where he played for the Primose Hill Cricket Club and was prolific both as a batsman and a bowler. After moving to Wells, Falck soon became entrenched in the local sporting scene, joining Wells City F.C. and Wells City Cricket Club. He became a prominent club cricketer for Wells, and in June 1934 won the 'Jack Hobbs Bat', a national award for club cricketers by the News Chronicle newspaper for scoring 156 out of a total of 218 for Wells against Purnell's. During his first season with Wells, he scored 957 of the club's 2,005 runs, and was described by the Wells Journal as "without doubt [the] finest batsman the club has ever had".

During the 1930s, Somerset County Cricket Club tried various methods of increasing their revenue, and one of these was playing some of their games at other grounds around the county, away from their home in Taunton. One of the venues chosen was the Wells Athletic Ground, Falck's home ground. For their 1935 match against Worcestershire, Somerset called up Falck to make his debut in county cricket. In the first innings of that match Falck scored 28 of the 56 runs that Somerset totalled, before being bowled, and he added another 20 runs in the second innings, being praised in the Manchester Guardian for his performance. The Taunton Courier reported that due to his "fine showing" against Worcestershire, he was invited to travel with the team to Clacton-on-Sea and Maidstone to play games against Essex and Kent respectively. Falck made single figure scores in all four of his innings across these two matches, scoring two and eight not out against Essex and three and one against Kent. He was invited to remain with the team and play in their following three matches, but had to turn down the offer due to business commitments. He made one further appearance for Somerset, playing against Gloucestershire in 1936, when he scored twelve and zero. He completed his short first-class career with 74 runs scored at an average of 10.57, and he did not bowl for Somerset. He continued to play club cricket well into his 40s, and later took up golf and snooker.

== Bibliography ==
- Foot, David (1986). Sunshine, Sixes and Cider: The History of Somerset Cricket. Newton Abbot, Devon: David & Charles. ISBN 0-7153-8890-8.
- Hill, Stephen; Phillips, Barry (2017). Somerset Cricketers 1919 – 1939. Wellington, Somerset: Halsgrove. ISBN 978-0-85704-306-1.
