= Antoine Lox =

Belgian cyclist

Personal information
- Born: 14 March 1900
- Died: 25 February 1982 (aged 81)

Cycling career
- Sport: Cycling
- Discipline: Road
- Role: Rider

Antoine Lox (14 March 1900 – 25 February 1982) was a Belgian racing cyclist. He rode in the 1928 Tour de France.
