= Elena Alekseevna Tatarinova =

Elena Alekseevna Tatarinova (May 26, 1897 – June 27, 1987) was a Soviet/Tajik sculptress. She designed the Dushanbe Stella (1954).
