= Irena Białówna =

Polish physician (1900–1982)

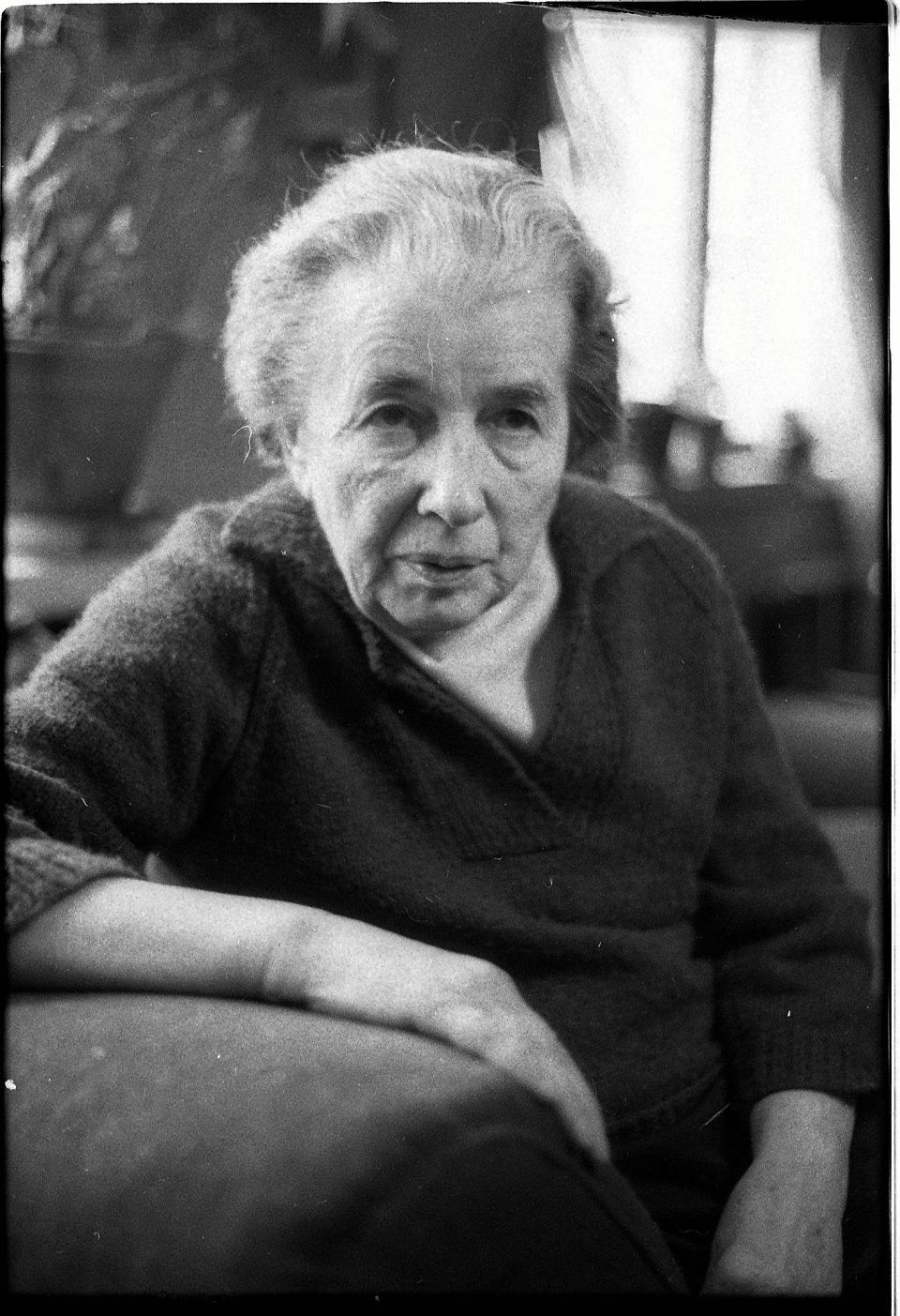
- Born: 3 November 1900; Caricyn, Russian Empire
- Died: 7 February 1982 (aged 81); Białystok, Poland
- Other names: Irena Biała, "Bronka"
- Education: Medical University of Warsaw

Irena Białówna (3 November 1900 – 7 February 1982) was a Polish pediatrician, public health professional, concentration camp survivor, and member of the Polish parliament.

== Biography ==
Białówna was born in 1900 in Caricyn (Volgograd) to railway engineer Józef Biały, and teacher Kazimiera née Kobylińska. Both of her parents were the children of physicians. Her maternal grandfather, Dr Jan Kobyliński, was deported to Simbirsk for treating wounded Polish insurgents in the 1863 Uprising.

The family home offered hospitality to many Polish people who were working in Russia. Białówna attended Russian secondary school, but also spoke fluent Polish and was familiar with Polish history and literature.

In 1920 she started studying medicine at the University of Voronezh in Central Russia. After a year she moved with her family to Poland to continue her studies at the Medical University of Warsaw. When she was in her fourth year she was president of the students’ paediatric society attached to the children's clinic directed by Professor Mieczysław Michałowicz. She obtained her diploma in 1927.

She rejected a job offered by the university and instead moved to Białystok. She volunteered at the St. Roche's Hospital, worked as a school doctor and co-organized summer camps for children from poverty-stricken families.

During the Invasion of Poland, she served in the Polish Red Cross. In 1941, she was the head of the Children's Department at the hospital at Fabryczna and Warszawska Streets where, together with Anna Ellert, they provided care for Polish, Jewish and Soviet children lost in the war. At that time Białówna also became active in the Union of Armed Struggle of the Home Army under the pseudonym "Bronka".

Białówna was arrested by the Gestapo on March 12, 1942 for the work she did in the underground resistance movement and taken to the Gestapo seat at 15 Sienkiewicza Street. The investigation lasted five months, after which she was interned at the Białystok central prison where she provided medical aid to fellow prisoners and managed to subdue the outbreak of typhus, with which she also became infected. She was transferred to a prison in Kraków, then to the Auschwitz-Birkenau concentration camp, where, together with other doctors, she was dedicated to supporting interned mothers and their children and forged documentation to protect female prisoners.

Thanks to Białówna's influence the inmates received more blankets and a change of mattresses and sheets. She enhanced the stock of medications; she acquired needles and syringes for injections. Thanks to her efforts the block hygiene increased. The figures show the importance of the changes she and her associates introduced, notwithstanding the short supply of the resources: in the winter of 1943/44 the death rate in the block was about 50 per day, whereas in the winter of 1944/45 there were days when no one died, with over 300 patients in the block.

She was moved to the camp in Ravensbrück, then to Gross-Rosen and finally, to Neubrandenburg.

=== After the war ===
After the liberation of the camp, she was evacuated to Sweden, but returned to Białystok in September 1945. After the war, on her initiative the State Home for Small Children and the Training Center for Social Paediatrics and Obstetrics were created with UNICEF and Swedish funding, as well as paediatric and newborn departments in multiple Białystok hospitals.

She also ran a private practice, treating children from poor families for free, often supporting them monetarily out of her own pocket. Later, she worked, among others as the head of the children's ward of the Provincial Śniadecki Hospital, where the Department and Clinic of Children's Diseases of the Medical University of Bialystok were established. She founded and acted as first president of the Białystok Branch of the Polish Paediatric Society. Białówna held the position of assistant professor.

She resigned from University duties after being elected to Sejm in 1957 with 194,010 votes in the Białystok Province. There she was active in the Health Committee and the Social Affairs and Social Policy Committee. She was a member of the International Paediatric Society, Scientific Council at the Minister of Health and Social Welfare, Scientific Council of the Institute of Mother and Child.

=== Personal life and death ===
Białówna died in Białystok on 7 February 1982.

== Legacy ==
In 1990 the City Council of Białystok named a street in her honour.
