= Matti Vuorinen =

Finnish mathematician (born 1948)

Matti Vuorinen (born 6 November 1948 in Turku) is a Finnish mathematician working in the area of classical analysis. His main topics of interest include geometric function theory, quasiregular and quasiconformal mappings, computational potential theory, and generalized hyperbolic geometry.

He has worked as a professor of mathematics at the University of Turku and University of Helsinki, Finland and supervised 13 PhD theses and more than a hundred MSc theses. Together with Olli Martio he organized the Helsinki Analysis Seminar three decades, in 1986–2016. With the grants of Academy of Finland and other grants he has hosted more than a hundred research/postdoc visits to Universities of Turku and Helsinki.

His network of coauthors includes 80 mathematicians from all corners of world: European countries, USA, Russia, China, India, Japan, New Zealand. His collaboration with this network includes more than 200 publications, including 3 books on quasiregular and quasiconformal mappings.

He has worked altogether more than five years at leading research institutions of his research area: The University of Michigan, Ann Arbor, Michigan, Technische Universität Berlin, the Mittag-Leffler Institute, Sweden, Institute of Mathematics, Novosibirsk.

== Selected publications ==
- P. Hariri, R. Klén and M. Vuorinen: Conformally Invariant Metrics and Quasiconformal Mappings. Springer. 2020. ISBN 978-3-030-32067-6; xix+502 pp.
- M. Vuorinen: Conformal geometry and quasiregular mappings. Lecture Notes in Mathematics. Vol. 1319. Berlin, Heidelberg, New York: Springer-Verlag. 1988. ISBN 3-540-19342-1; xix+209 pp.
- G.D. Anderson, M.K. Vamanamurthy, M.K. Vuorinen: Conformal invariants, inequalities, and quasiconformal maps. Canadian Mathematical Society Series of Monographs and Advanced Texts. New York: A Wiley-Interscience Publication. John Wiley & Sons. 1997. ISBN 0-471-59486-5; xxviii+505 pp.
