= Roy Kemp =

Australian rules footballer

Personal information
- Full name: Arthur Roy Kemp
- Born: 4 November 1895; Essendon, Victoria
- Died: 2 February 1982 (aged 86); Murrumbeena, Victoria
- Height: 174 cm (5 ft 9 in)
- Weight: 68 kg (150 lb)

Playing career^{1}
Years	Club	Games (Goals)
1922	Essendon	12 (4)
- ^{1} Playing statistics correct to the end of 1922.

Roy Kemp (4 November 1895 – 2 February 1982) was an Australian rules footballer who played with Essendon in the Victorian Football League (VFL).
