= Ella V. Aldrich Schwing =

American Librarian (1902 – 1982)

- Born: Ella Virginia Aldrich; October 24, 1902; Baton Rouge, Louisiana, United States
- Died: February 21, 1982 (aged 79)
- Occupations: Librarian; professor
- Notable work: Using Books and Libraries
- Spouse: Calvin K Schwing

Ella Virginia Aldrich Schwing (October 24, 1902 – February 21, 1982) was an American librarian, professor, and pioneer of library user instruction. She is known for her textbook Using Books and Libraries. She also served on the Louisiana State University Board of Supervisors.

== Early career and education ==
Ella V. Aldrich Schwing was born on October 24, 1902, in Baton Rouge, Louisiana to Lawson Burfoot Aldrich, a lawyer, and Ella Leonard (née Lanier) Aldrich. She attended Baton Rouge High School. She graduated with a B.A. in English and chemistry from Louisiana State University in 1923. Aldrich worked as an English teacher for one year in Brusly High School in West Baton Rouge Parish. She continued to work in Baton Rouge public schools for several years. In 1926, Aldrich served as the first director of the Baton Rouge Girl Scouts

In 1930, Aldrich received a B.S. in library science from Columbia University. In 1931, she received an M.A. in comparative literature from Louisiana State University. During her graduate studies, she worked part-time in the circulation department of Hill Memorial Library. In 1931, she worked briefly as a catalog librarian at Sara Lawrence College in New York before returning to Louisiana State University as part of the library staff in September of that year.

In 1935, she was one of ten recipients (and the only woman) of the American Library Association's traveling library fellowships to visit and study county regional libraries in the United States and Canada. As part of the fellowship, she spent a summer at Columbia University studying under Essae Martha Culver and Lyman Bryson.

== Library user instruction ==
In 1936, after the fellowship tour, Aldrich began teaching a one-credit course, required for all freshman, in the use of libraries. To accompany the course, she authored the textbook Using Books and Libraries, modified in later editions for use in any academic library. One of the first of its kind, the textbook received positive reviews and saw wide adoption in first-year library instruction throughout the US.

In conjunction with her freshman course, Aldrich established the Department of Books and Libraries within the College of Arts and Sciences and served as its head from 1936 to 1947. She also was an assistant professor in the university's Library School.

In 1963, Aldrich coauthored with Thomas Edward Camp, a Librarian from The University of the South, the textbook Using Theological Books and Libraries, with much content adapted from Aldrich's previous textbook.

== Professional service and recognition ==
Aldrich was active in the American Library Association Junior Members Round Table, including serving on the Committee on Library Information Leaflets. In 1936, she was appointed Southwest District Secretary for the Junior section. In the main organization, she was Chairman of the ALA Membership Committee during the early 1940s. Aldrich was President of the Louisiana Library Association from 1940 to 1941. She served on the American Library Association Council from 1946 to 1947 as well as the Library Committee of the World Trade Association. She also served as the regional director of the Association of Governing Boards of State Universities and Allied Institutions. In 1959, she was State Vice Chairman of the Louisiana Heart Association and established a memorial heart research fund in honor of her late husband, Calvin K Schwing, who died of a heart attack on October 24, 1955. She was selected as an associate member of Theta Sigma Phi and named one of five patronesses in the Baton Rouge area at the 1960 Theta Sigma Phi Matrix banquet.

In 1952, Aldrich was appointed to the Board of Supervisors of Louisiana State University. She served early in her term during a controversial debate over a proposed enlargement of Tiger Stadium in 1953. Aldrich proposed that the board go on record in favor of allocating funds for a new library instead of the stadium project, which was facing widespread student and faculty opposition, but her motion was unsuccessful.

Aldrich made several monetary contributions to the university libraries including a $1,000 donation to the Friends of the LSU Libraries in 1963 and a donation of a $25,000 life insurance policy on herself with the main library as the beneficiary.

== Death and legacy ==
Ella V. Aldrich Schwing died on February 21, 1982, in Baton Rouge.

In 1981, the LSU Library Lecture series was renamed the Schwing Library Lecture Series. Aldrich had sponsored the series since 1966.

In 1990, Aldrich's one-credit freshman course in library usage was still being taught at LSU as a general elective and requirement for some departments.
