= Marian Elizabeth Ridgeway =

American political scientist

- Born: 20 September 1913
- Died: 14 February 1982 (aged 68); Columbia, Missouri
- Education: University of Missouri; University of Illinois
- Scientific career
- Fields: Political science
- Workplaces: University of Missouri; Washington State University; University of Kansas; Southern Illinois University Carbondale

Marian Elizabeth Ridgeway (September 20, 1913 – February 14, 1982) was an American political scientist. She was a professor of political science at Southern Illinois University Carbondale. She was an expert on state policies and politics in the United States. Her research on the politics of American states included studying the implications of interstate compacts for federalism, and a book about the Pick–Sloan Missouri Basin Program that became a classic work in the politics of water conservation and flood prevention in the United States.

== Life and career ==
The daughter of William Jefferson Ridgeway and Esther Crooks Ridgeway, Marian Elizabeth Ridgeway was born on September 20, 1913 in Kansas City, Missouri. She attended the University of Missouri, where she graduated with a bachelor's degree in journalism in 1935, followed by a master's degree in political science in 1946. In 1952, she completed a PhD at the University of Illinois. She was a member of the faculty at the University at Missouri, at Washington State University (then called Washington State College), and the University of Kansas, before moving in 1952 to Southern Illinois University at Carbondale, where she worked until her retirement in 1974. When she was promoted to full professor at Southern Illinois University in 1969, she became the 47th woman to achieve the position of full professor at a university in the United States.

Ridgeway was the author of two books. In 1955, she published the book The Missouri Basin's Pick-Sloan Plan, which was based on her dissertation research. Ridgeway analyzed the political context of the Pick–Sloan Missouri Basin Program to conserve the water resources of the basin of the Missouri River. It focused on both the development of the policies that created the Pick-Sloan plan and the politics surrounding the unfolding events of the Pick-Sloan project during the decade after the legislation's passage. The book became the standard history of the politics around flood control policies in the mid-century United States, particularly around the Flood Control Act of 1944. She published a second book, Interstate compacts: A question of federalism, in 1971. Ridgeway's research of state politics in the United States informed extensive expert consultation for government organizations, particularly for the Commission on State Government in Illinois, including reports and expert testimony to the United States Congress on water usage policy. She was also involved in leadership roles with the League of Women Voters, the American Association of University Professors, and the American Association of University Women.

Ridgeway died on February 14, 1982, in Columbia, Missouri.

== Selected works ==
- The Missouri Basin's Pick-Sloan Plan (1955)
- Interstate compacts: A question of federalism (1971)
