= Nathan A. Zepell =

Holocaust survivor & pen inventor

Nathan Alter Zepell
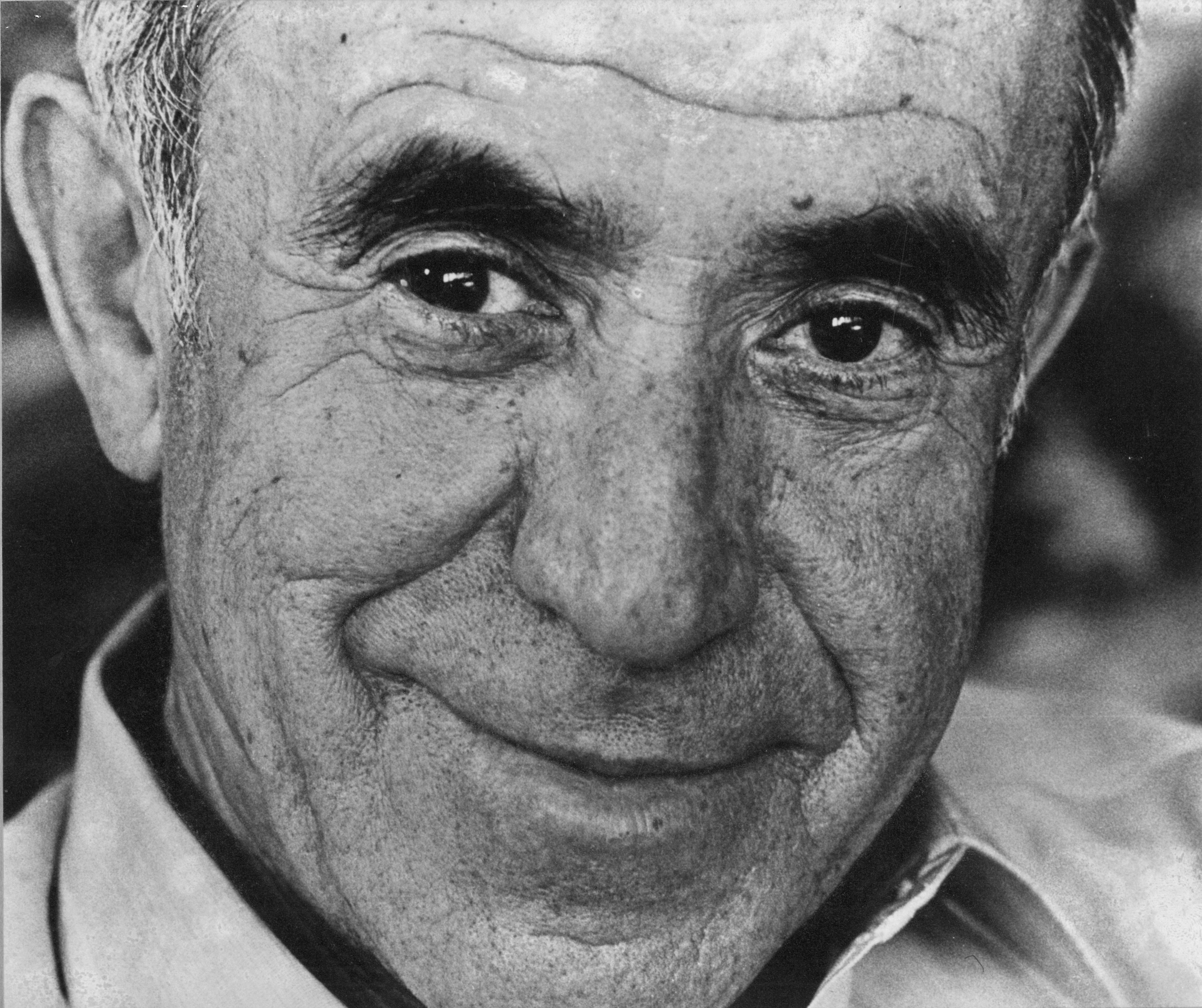
- Born: January 6, 1915; Riga, Latvia
- Died: February 28, 1982 (aged 67); Santa Barbara, CA, US
- Resting place: Chicago, IL
- Occupation: Inventor
- Spouse: June G. Zepell

Nathan A. Zepell (January 6, 1915 – February 28, 1982) was born in Riga, Latvia. He survived the Russian occupation of his Latvian homeland following World War I and the Great Depression, survived the Nazi Holocaust, and helped create a Jewish state in Israel before immigrating to America. Ultimately, Zepell patented forty inventions and over 200 million of his pens have been sold worldwide.

== Early life ==
Nathan Alter Zepelovitch (later changed to Zepell) was born in Riga, Latvia during World War I. Zepell attended Riga University where he studied electro-mechanical engineering. When the Great Depression hit Latvia in 1933, Zepell left the university to find work. Since there were no opportunities for employment, as a 17-year old entrepreneur he created his own furniture hardware manufacturing factory. Following the non-aggression pact between Nazi Germany and the Soviet Union in 1940 (Molotov–Ribbentrop Pact), the Soviets annexed Latvia and nationalized all Latvian businesses. Zepell was permitted to remain as the manager of his factory, a situation that ended when the Nazis invaded Latvia in 1941.

== Nazi German Occupation ==
=== Riga Ghetto ===
On June 22, 1941, the Nazis launched Operation Barbarossa to conquer the western Soviet Union territories for Germany. They forced non-Germans into slave labor, and started killing communists, gypsies, the mentally ill, and especially Jews who were considered as “undesirables”, in order to “cleanse” the country for the Aryan race. To facilitate their plans the Nazis forced all the Jews in Riga (approximately 29,000) into the Riga Ghetto, and imposed restrictions on Jewish businesses and possessions.

Zepell was forced to work for the Nazis outside the ghetto during the day. On December 8, 1941, in what was to be later known as the Rumbula massacre, everyone that Zepell knew, including his parents, friends and his 19-year old fiancée, were murdered by the Nazis.

=== Buchenwald Concentration Camp ===
Zepell was sent to the Buchenwald concentration camp, where he spent four years working in one of the satellite labor camps that did carpentry and mechanical maintenance work for the Nazis.

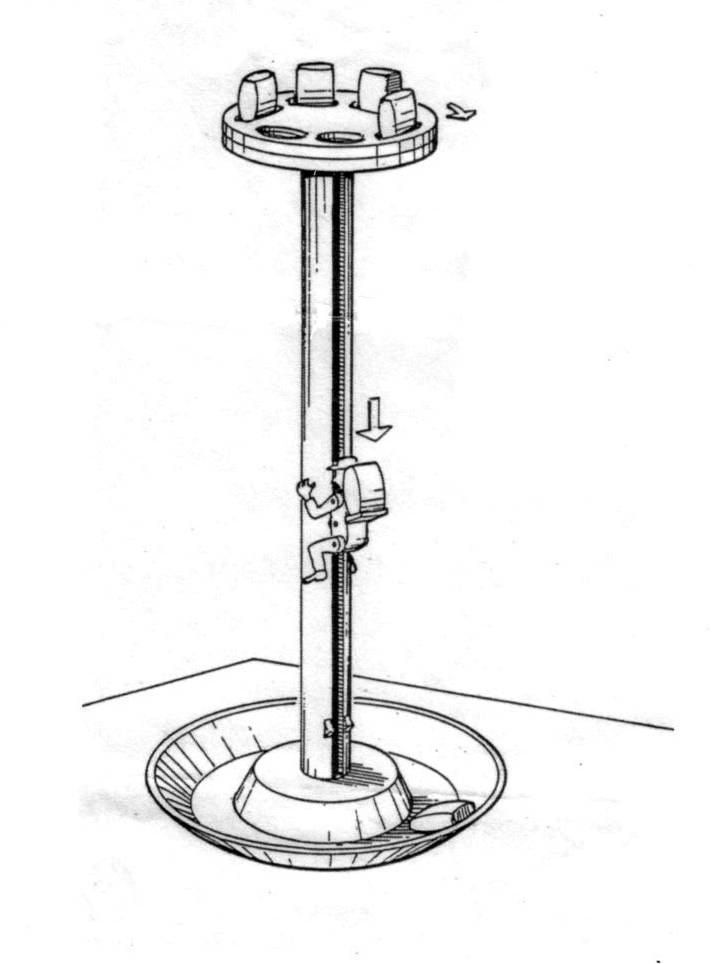
Figure 1: The Buchenwald Toy How the Toy Works: The vertical post is hollow. A cord attached to the wooden man runs through a slot and around a pulley to a counterweight inside the post. The counterweight which is heavier than the wooden man, lifts the man to the top of the post. When the wooden man reaches the top collar, the momentum knocks one of the sacks onto his back. Now the wooden man with the sack is heavier than the counterweight, so he climbs down the post. Once the wooden man reaches the bottom of the post there is a small protrusion that tilts him so the sack falls off his back on to the tray. At this point the man then becomes lighter and able to climb back up the post again. This cycle repeats until all six sacks of have been retrieved.

In mid-December 1943 the Buchenwald Commandant came to Zepell's barrack with an unusual request for the prisoners to make a toy to give his children in Berlin for Christmas. The Commandant said that if they would make a toy to excite his children they all might live longer. Zepell devised an idea for creating the requested toy. The inmates worked for two days and nights using a hand drill mounted horizontally on a bench, which the 30 inmates took turns turning it as a lathe to make a wooden toy.

The toy consisted of a wooden base with a round collar on top of a post. On top there were six wooden blocks representing sacks of flour. A wooden man would climb the post to retrieve all the wooden sacks (refer to Figure 1, with a description on how the toy works). Two weeks after Christmas the Commandant came back to Zepell's barrack with a letter from his wife indicating how much their children enjoyed the new toy. So the toy of a man laboring up and down a post to retrieve sacks of flour that was made by inmates in a Nazi slave labor camp, saved the life of Zepell and his twenty-nine fellow inmates.

=== Escape From The Nazis ===
With the war coming to an end the Nazis started evacuating concentration camps. On April 6, 1945, the Buchenwald guards lined up all the inmates (approximately 8,000) for a forced march to Brandenburg (west of Berlin). While on the forced march Zepell and two friends escaped. The three traveled away from the forced march hiding in the woods for a month before ultimately arriving in the village of Prezien, Germany. Weighing only 87 pounds, Zepell was near death. Soon the Russians arrived in the village and Zepell was finally safe. Zepell was one of only about 1,000 of the approximately 94,000 pre-World War II Latvian Jews to survive the Holocaust.

== Israel Struggle for Independence ==
Three months after the end of World War II, Zepell went to Israel (Mandatory Palestine). During the 1948 Arab–Israeli War Zepell invented military weapons for the Israeli paramilitary organization (Haganah). He focused on designing weapons that would scare the enemy, such as a bottle launcher that threw empty bottles sideways so they would whistle like a bunker buster.

Based on Zepell's weapons work he was introduced to Nahum Bernstein, a New York lawyer who was setting-up several front companies to provide legal cover for the arms export to Israel's Haganah. After Israel's War of Independence, Mr. Bernstein encouraged Zepell to come to America to pursue the development and manufacturing of his pen inventions.

== Immigration to America ==
In August 1949 Zepell came to New York City to market his latest pen invention, a fountain pen that could be clipped to a shirt pocket with the writing tip upward to prevent leaking. Zepell tried selling his inventions to major U.S. pen companies, but his pens were considered too complicated to be marketable. Zepell spent 9-years trying to promote his pen inventions, including a ballpoint pen with a rocking side clip that retracted and extended the writing point. To fasten the pen in a shirt pocket, the clip had to be moved outward from the barrel, automatically retracting the ballpoint, which prevented the pen's ink from leaking in a shirt pocket. Zepell called this the “Remember Pen”. He sold his pen invention to the Columbia Pen and Pencil Company, who renamed it the “Wingmatic” that launched Zepell's pen inventing career.

In September 1959, only two months after he sold his pen patent to Columbia Pen and Pencil Company, Zepell was offered a job as a product development engineer at the Sheaffer Pen Company. Zepell worked in Sheaffer Pen's Research and Development Division for three years at their headquarters in Fort Madison, Iowa. The Sheaffer Pen Company marketed Zepell's invention as the Safeguard pen with the “Reminder” clip.

After Zepell left Sheaffer Pen he moved to Chicago where he met and married June Ruth Goldberg, received his U.S. citizenship, and shortened his name to Zepell. Nathan and June Zepell moved to Santa Barbara, California in 1966, where he continued his pen inventing career. His final invention was the “Pentastic”, which was a flat plastic, dual cartridge ballpoint pen that he manufactured in his own company, Zepell Products Co. from 1977 to 1979.
