= Sedan High School =

Public high school in Sedan, Kansas

Sedan Junior/Senior High School

Location
- 416 East Elm Street; Sedan, Kansas 67361; United States; 37.1295°N 96.1831°W

Information
- School type: Public, High School
- School district: Chautauqua County USD 286
- CEEB code: 172720
- Teaching staff: 15.90 (FTE)
- Grades: 6 to 12
- Gender: coed
- Enrollment: 188 (2023-2024)
- Student to teacher ratio: 11.82
- Campus type: Rural
- Communities served: Sedan, Peru, Elgin, Chautauqua
- Website: www.usd286.org/6254_2

Sedan Junior and Senior High School is a public middle and high school in Sedan, Kansas, United States. It is the sole high school operated by Chautauqua County USD 286 school district, and serves students of grades 7 to 12. The school colors are blue and white and the school mascot is the blue devil.

== History ==
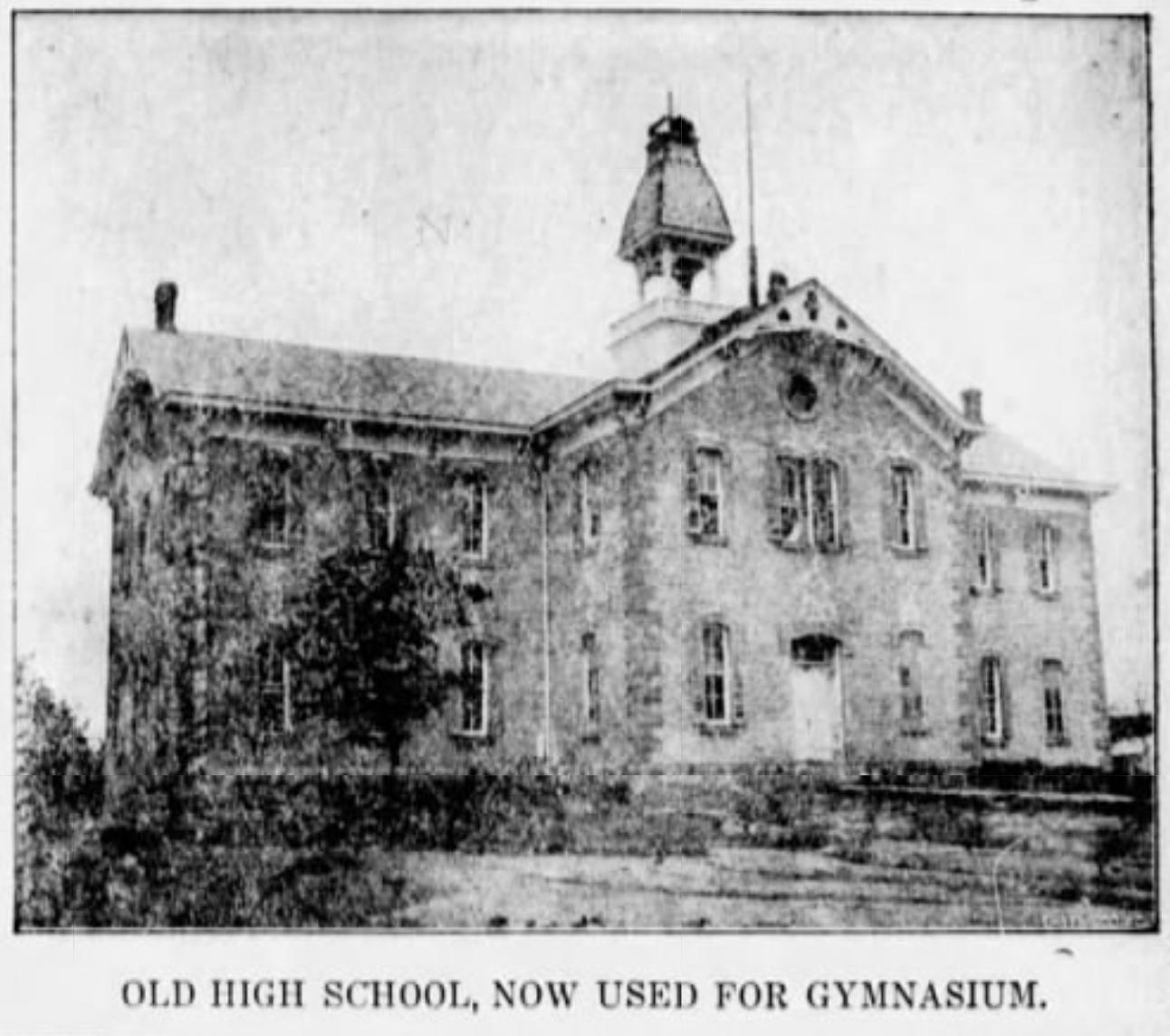
First Sedan High School building, used as gymnasium in 1923

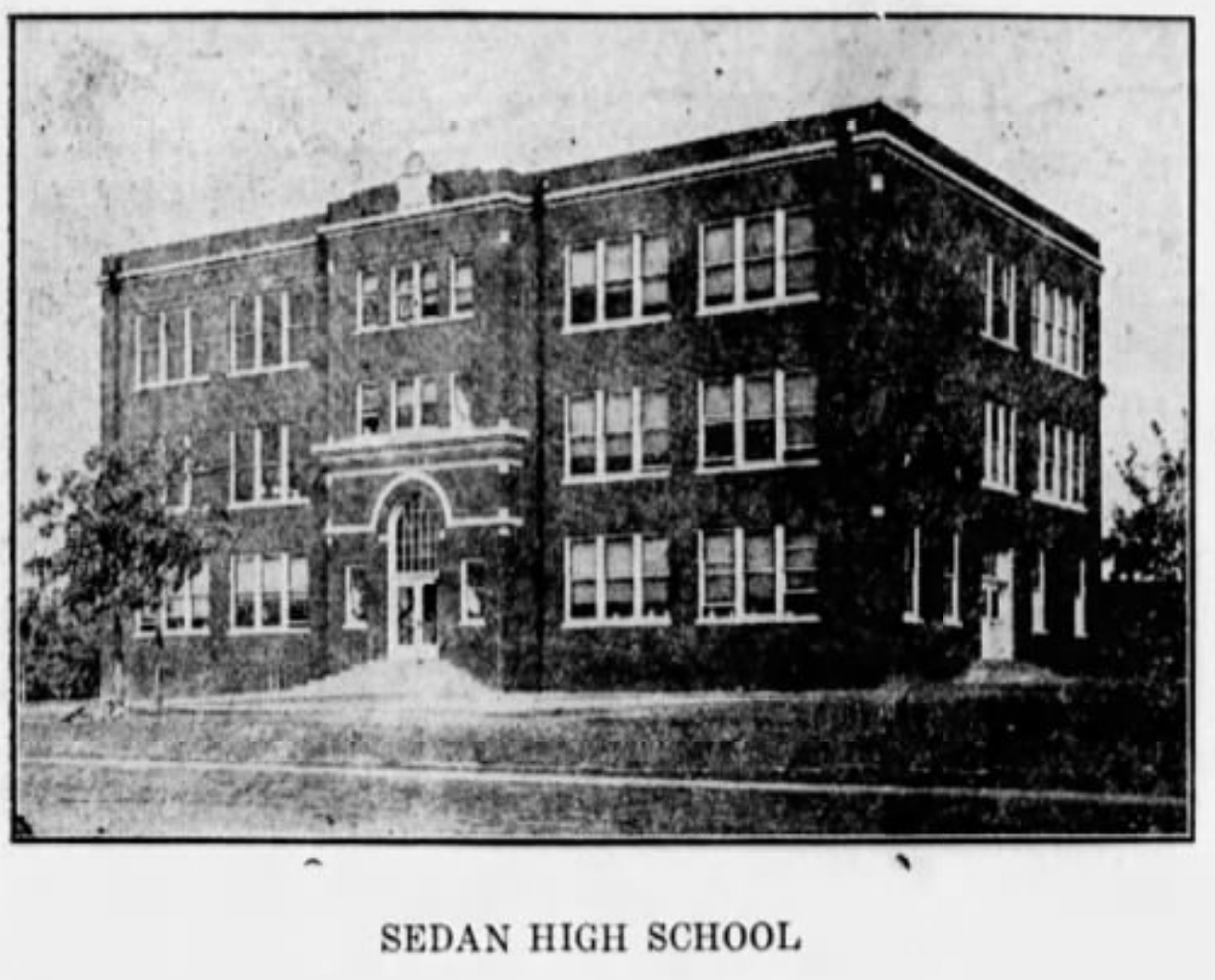
Sedan High School, 1923

Sedan High School graduated its first class of five students in 1889. In 1900, the hardwood floors of the first school building were replaced, and a new school building was built in 1904. The curriculum in 1902 for the "A Class" consisted of "Geometry, Physics, General History, Shakespeare, Cicero, Bookeeping, Shorthand, Commercial Law, Penmanship, Typewriting" during the first term, then "Geometry, Physics, Political Economy, Virgil, Bookeeping, Shorthand, Dictation, Penmanship, Typewriting" during the second term.

By 1923, The Sedan Times-Star reported, "In our school district, No. 44, we have invested in buildings and equipment approximately $100,000.00 and our operating expense is from $35,000.00 to $40,000.00 per year." The paper also noted the school's membership in the North Central Association of high schools that had been formed in 1895.

A Works Progress Administration project took place at the school in 1937.

By 1949, the school had graduated a total of 946 students in its first fifty years.

In 1960, a $380,000 bond issue was approved to construct a new building. The contract for the building went to H. D. Perkins Construction Co., Bartlesville, Oklahoma, with a bid of $181,229.

The attorney for Unified School District 286 requested an opinion of the state's attorney general in 1994 to determine whether the school mascot, the blue devil, was a religious symbol in violation of the U.S. Constitution's First and Fourteenth Amendments prohibiting establishment of a state religion. Attorney General Bob Stephan published a legal opinion that the mascot was unlikely to be perceived in a religious context.

In the 2019–2020 school year, there were 163 students enrolled in grades 7–12, and a student to teacher ratio of 11.81. And in the 2023-2024 school year, the student population reached up to 188, with a student to teacher ratio of 11.82.

== See also ==
- List of high schools in Kansas
- List of unified school districts in Kansas
