= Buck Grant (ice hockey) =

Canadian ice hockey player

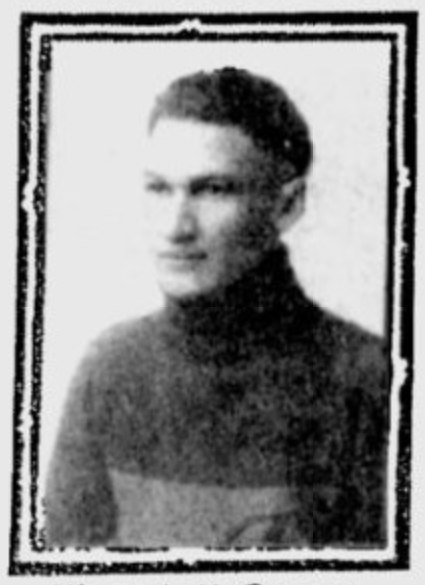
- Grant with the Edmonton Dominions in 1920–21.
- Born: October 2, 1894 Fannystelle, Manitoba, Canada
- Died: February 12, 1982 (aged 87)
- Height: 5 ft 8 in (173 cm)
- Weight: 137 lb (62 kg; 9 st 11 lb)
- Position: Left wing
- Played for: Saskatoon Sheiks; Edmonton Eskimos
- Playing career: 1914–1926

Louis Alexandre Conrad "Buck" Grant (October 2, 1894 – February 12, 1982) was a Canadian professional ice hockey player. He played in the Western Canada Hockey League with the Saskatoon Sheiks (1921–22 season) and Edmonton Eskimos (1921–22 season to 1922–23 season). He was a left winger. Grant also played with the Coleman Tigers in Coleman, Alberta.
