= Jack Jennings (basketball, born 1918) =

American basketball player

Personal information
- Born: April 2, 1918 Walla Walla, Washington, U.S.
- Died: February 8, 1982 (aged 63) Seattle, Washington, U.S.
- Listed height: 6 ft 6 in (1.98 m)
- Listed weight: 195 lb (88 kg)

Career information
- College: Washington State (1937–1940)
- Position: Forward / center

Career history

Playing
- 1940–1941: Akron Firestone Non-Skids
- 1946–1947: Yakima Ramblers

Coaching
- 1945–1946: Yakima HS (assistant)
- 1946–1955?: Yakima HS

Jack Leroy Jennings (April 2, 1918 – February 8, 1982) was an American professional basketball player. He played in the National Basketball League for the Akron Firestone Non-Skids during the 1940–41 season and averaged 4.9 points per game. He also spent one season playing for the Yakima Ramblers in the Pacific Coast Professional Basketball League.
