= Jaakko Vuorinen =

Finnish fencer

Personal information
- Born: 25 July 1923 Helsinki, Finland
- Died: 19 February 1982 (aged 58) Tampere, Finland

Sport
- Sport: Fencing

Jaakko Vuorinen (25 July 1923 – 19 February 1982) was a Finnish fencer. He competed in the team épée event at the 1952 Summer Olympics.
