= Harrold Sincock =

Australian cricketer

Personal information
- Born: 10 December 1907; Eastwood, South Australia
- Died: 2 February 1982 (aged 74)
- Source: Cricinfo, 25 September 2020

Harrold Sincock (10 December 1907 – 2 February 1982) was an Australian cricketer. He played in two first-class matches for South Australia in 1929/30, one of those matches being against Queensland on 25 December 1929 where he batted for 11 and 17 and bowled 0 wickets for 53 runs.

== See also ==
- List of South Australian representative cricketers
