= Malika Sobirova =

Soviet ballet dancer (1942–1982)

- Малика Собирова
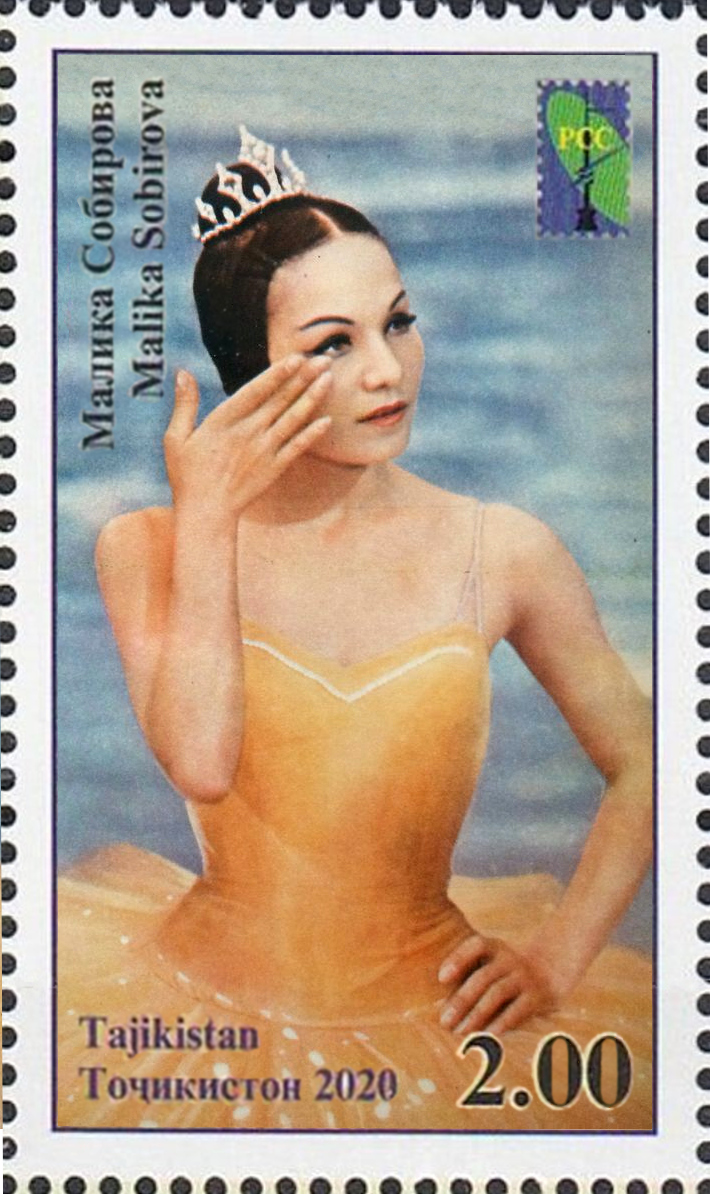
- Sobirova on a 2020 stamp of Tajikistan
- Born: 22 May 1942; Stalinabad, Tajik SSR, Soviet Union
- Died: 27 February 1982 (aged 39); Dushanbe, Tajik SSR, Soviet Union
- Occupations: Ballet dancer, pedagogue

Malika Abdurakhmonovna Sobirova (Tajik: Малика Абдураҳмоновна Собирова, Russian: Малика́ Абдурахи́мовна Саби́рова; 22 May 1942 — 27 February 1982) was a Soviet and Tajik ballet dancer and pedagogue. She is considered the most famous Tajik ballet dancer. In 1969, she won a gold medal in an international ballet dance competition.

== Early life ==
Sobirova was born in 1942 in Stalinabad, the capital of Tajikistan. Her father Ibragim Sobirov was a musician and her mother Madina Sobirova was a nurse. As a young girl she was very stubborn and refused to be frightened into an arranged marriage, as per the then prevalent practice; and instead pursued her talent in dance. She took her dancing course from Leningrad Choreography Academy (the Vaganova Ballet School), from where she graduated in 1961. It was a tradition among the students of this ballet school to consider themselves incomplete till they performed the Swan dance. She was also keen to learn the complete music of the ballet.

== Career ==
In 1961, after graduating she returned to Dushanbe and joined Onegin Theatre. She also joined People's Artist of the USSR and regularly performed at Tchaikovsky Hall. She was proficient in all classical forms of ballet and won several international awards. As a solo ballet dancer her repertoire included all the classical forms, and performed in ballets like the Leili i Medzhnun (Leili and Medjnun) for which music score was provided by Balasanian. She was a popular ballet dancer in the Soviet Union. She was the most popular dancer of the Opera and Ballet theater which was established in 1940. She was delighted like a child when people recognized her in the bus or total strangers greeted her as a ballerina.

== Awards ==
She received the first prize at the Tchaikovsky International Ballet Contest in Moscow. In 1969, Sobirova won a gold medal in an international ballet dance competition held in Varna, Bulgaria. She was also recipient of Tadzhik Komsomol Central Committee order "The Badge of Honor." The first international ballet dancing contest held in Dushanbe was named after her and Mikhail Gorbachev sent greetings on the occasion.
