= Hack (name) =

Hack is a surname, given name, and nickname. Notable people with the name include:

== People with the surname ==
- Alexander Hack (born 1993), German footballer
- Alfred Hack (1905–1933) Australian cricketer
- Dave Hack (born 1972), Canadian Football retired offensive lineman
- Dorothy Weisel Hack (1910–1963), American amateur tennis player
- Edward Hack (1913–1987), English cricketer
- Franz Hack (1915–1997), German SS officer during World War II
- Frederick Hack (1877–1939), Australian cricketer and motor body builder
- Georg Hack (1950–2026), German international speedway rider
- Hermann Josef Hack (born 1956), German artist
- Howard Hack (1932–2015), American artist
- Jefferson Hack (born 1971), Uruguayan journalist and magazine editor
- Jodi Hack, American politician elected to the Oregon House of Representatives in 2014
- John Barton Hack (1805–1884), settler in South Australia
- John Tilton Hack (1913–1991), American geomorphologist
- Karl Hack (historian) (born 1966), historian of Southeast Asia, empire and counter-insurgency
- Lester G. Hack (1844–1928), American Civil War soldier awarded the Medal of Honor
- Margherita Hack (1922–2013), Italian astrophysicist
- Maria Hack (1777–1844), English writer of educational books for children
- Olivia Hack (born 1983), American voice actress
- Petra Hack (born 1970), German model
- Reginald Hack (1907–1971), Australian cricketer
- Richard Hack (born 1951), American writer
- Sabine Hack (born 1969), German tennis player
- Shelley Hack (born 1947), American model and actress
- Stan Hack (1909–1979), American Major League Baseball player and manager
- Stephen Hack (1816–1894), settler of South Australia
- Wilton Hack (1843–1923), Australian artist, traveller, lecturer and utopist

== People with the given name ==
- Henry Hack Eibel (1893–1945), Major League Baseball utility player in the 1912 and 1920 seasons
- Hack Kampmann (1856–1920), Danish architect and professor of architecture
- Hack Kampmann (1913–2005), Danish-Swedish architect

== People with the nickname ==
- David Hackworth (1930–2005), United States Army soldier and military journalist
- Hack Miller (1894–1971), American Major League Baseball player
- Hack Miller (catcher) (1913–1966), American Major League Baseball catcher
- Hack Schumann (1884–1946), American Major League Baseball pitcher
- Hack Simmons (1885–1942), American Major League Baseball player
- Hack Simpson (1909–1978), Canadian Olympic ice hockey player
- Hack Spencer (1885–1969), Major League Baseball pitcher in one game
- Hack Wilson (1900–1948), American Hall-of-Fame Major League Baseball player

== See also ==
- Hack (disambiguation)
