= Hacker (disambiguation) =

A hacker is a highly skilled computer expert. It may also refer to:

== Computing and technology ==
- Hacker culture, a computer programmer and security hacker subculture focused on intellectual and creative aspects of hacking
- HackerNest, a nonprofit organization and movement that builds local technology communities worldwide

== People ==
- Hacker (surname), includes a list of people with the name
- Michael Amato or The Hacker (born 1972), French electroclash and tech producer

== Arts, media, and entertainment ==
=== Fictional characters ===
- Hacker, cyborg sidekick character in TV series The Centurions
- Hacker T. Dog, puppet character on Scoop and CBBC links
- Hacker Republic, Lisbeth Salander aka Wasp, Plague, and Trinity, hacker friends and colleagues in the series which includes The Girl who Kicked the Hornet's Nest
- Jim Hacker, title character in Yes Minister and Yes Prime Minister
- Staff Sergeant Hacker, a character on the US TV series Gomer Pyle, U.S.M.C.
- The Nameless Hacker, the main protagonist of the game System Shock (1994)
- The Hacker, a character on the US TV series Cyberchase

=== Films and television ===
- Hacker (film), a 2016 crime thriller
- Hackers (film), 1995 MGM film starring Jonny Lee Miller and Angelina Jolie
- Hackers: Wizards of the Electronic Age, a 1985 video documentary inspired by Steven Levy's 1984 book
- "Hacker", a 2025 episode from Animator vs. Animation

=== Games ===
- Hacker (card game), 1992 Steve Jackson Games release
- Hacker (video game), 1985 puzzle/strategy computer game by Activision
  - Hacker II: The Doomsday Papers, 1986 sequel also by Activision
- Hackers (video game), 2016 strategy video game by Trickster Arts

=== Literature ===
- Hacker, a children's novel by Malorie Blackman
- Hackers (anthology), a 1996 anthology of short stories edited by Jack Dann and Gardner Dozois
- Hackers: Heroes of the Computer Revolution, a 1984 book by Steven Levy

=== Music ===
- "Hacker", a song on Death Grips's 2012 album The Money Store
- "The Hacker", a song by British industrial group Clock DVA

== Brands and enterprises ==
- Hacker Brewery, and its beer, since 1972 merged into Hacker-Pschorr Brewery
- Hacker Radio Ltd, a British manufacturer of consumer electronics products
- Hacker-Craft, boats made by the Hacker Boat Company

== See also ==
- Hack (disambiguation)
- Hacking (disambiguation)
- Hacks (disambiguation)
- Haka (disambiguation)
- Hakka (disambiguation)
