= Hack =

Hack may refer to:

== Arts, entertainment, and media ==
=== Games ===
- Hack (Unix video game), a 1984 roguelike video game
- .hack (video game series), a series of video games by the multimedia franchise .hack

=== Music ===
- Hack (album), a 1990 album by Information Society

=== Film ===
- Hack!, a 2007 film starring Danica McKellar
- Hacked (film), a 2020 Bollywood thriller film
- The Den (2013 film), a 2013 American film also known as Hacked

=== Other uses in arts, entertainment, and media ===
- Hack (comedy), a joke that is considered obvious, frequently used, or stolen
- Hack (comics), a Marvel Comics Universe mutant character
- Triple J Hack, an Australian current affairs radio program
- Hack (TV series), an American television series
- .hack, a Japanese multimedia franchise
- Lifehacker, a weblog about life hacks and software

== Computing ==
- Hack (computer science), an inelegant but effective solution to a computing problem
- Hack (computer security), to gain unauthorized access to computers and computer networks
- Hack (programming language), a programming language developed by Meta
- HACK (tag), a tag in a programming-language comment warning about a workaround
- Hack computer, a virtual computer described in the textbook The Elements of Computing Systems
- Hack (typeface), an open-source typeface designed for source code editing
- Domain hack, a domain name that suggests a word, phrase, or name

== Animals ==
- Hack (falconry), training method for young falcons
- Hack (horse), an animal used for pleasure riding, as well as the verb form (hacking, to hack) for the activity

== Sports ==
- Hack, a piece of equipment used for traction in the sport of curling
- Hack, a goal in a game of hacky sack, or the footbag circle kicking game
- Hack squat, a variant of the squat exercise

== Transport ==
- Hack, a motorcycle with a sidecar attached
- Hack, an illegal taxicab operation
- Hackney carriage, a London cab also known as a hack
- Station hack or squadron hack, a utility aircraft assigned to an air station or squadron

== Other uses ==
- Hack (masonry), a row of stacked unfired bricks protected from the rain
- Hack (name), a surname, given name and nickname
- Hack Circle, an amphitheatre in Christchurch, New Zealand, also known as Hack
- Hack writer or hack, a writer or journalist who produces low-quality articles or books
- Eduard Hackel (standard author abbreviation: Hack.) (1850–1926), Austrian botanist
- Life hack, productivity techniques used by programmers to solve everyday problems
- MIT hack, a clever, benign, and ethical prank or practical joke at the Massachusetts Institute of Technology
- Political hack, a person who devotes him/herself to party-political machinations
- Backslash, also known as hack
- Hack watch, a mechanical watch that can have the second hand stopped by pulling the crown out

== See also ==
- Hacker (disambiguation)
- Hacking (disambiguation)
- Hacks (disambiguation)
