= Mount Hack =

Mountain in Australia

- Yarrngarri Arraindanha Vambata
- Location within South Australia

Highest point
- Elevation: 1,086 m (3,563 ft)
- Coordinates: 30°46′20.6″S 138°47′57.1″E

Naming
- Etymology: Stephen Hack

Geography
- Location: Warraweena, South Australia
- Parent range: Flinders Ranges

Mount Hack, also known as Yarrngarri Arraindanha Vambata, is a mountain peak in the Flinders Ranges of South Australia located in the locality of Warraweena. Peak elevation is 1,086 metres (3,563 ft).

According to the book Chequered Lives, it was named after Stephen Hack, younger brother of John Barton Hack.

== See also ==
- List of mountains in Australia
