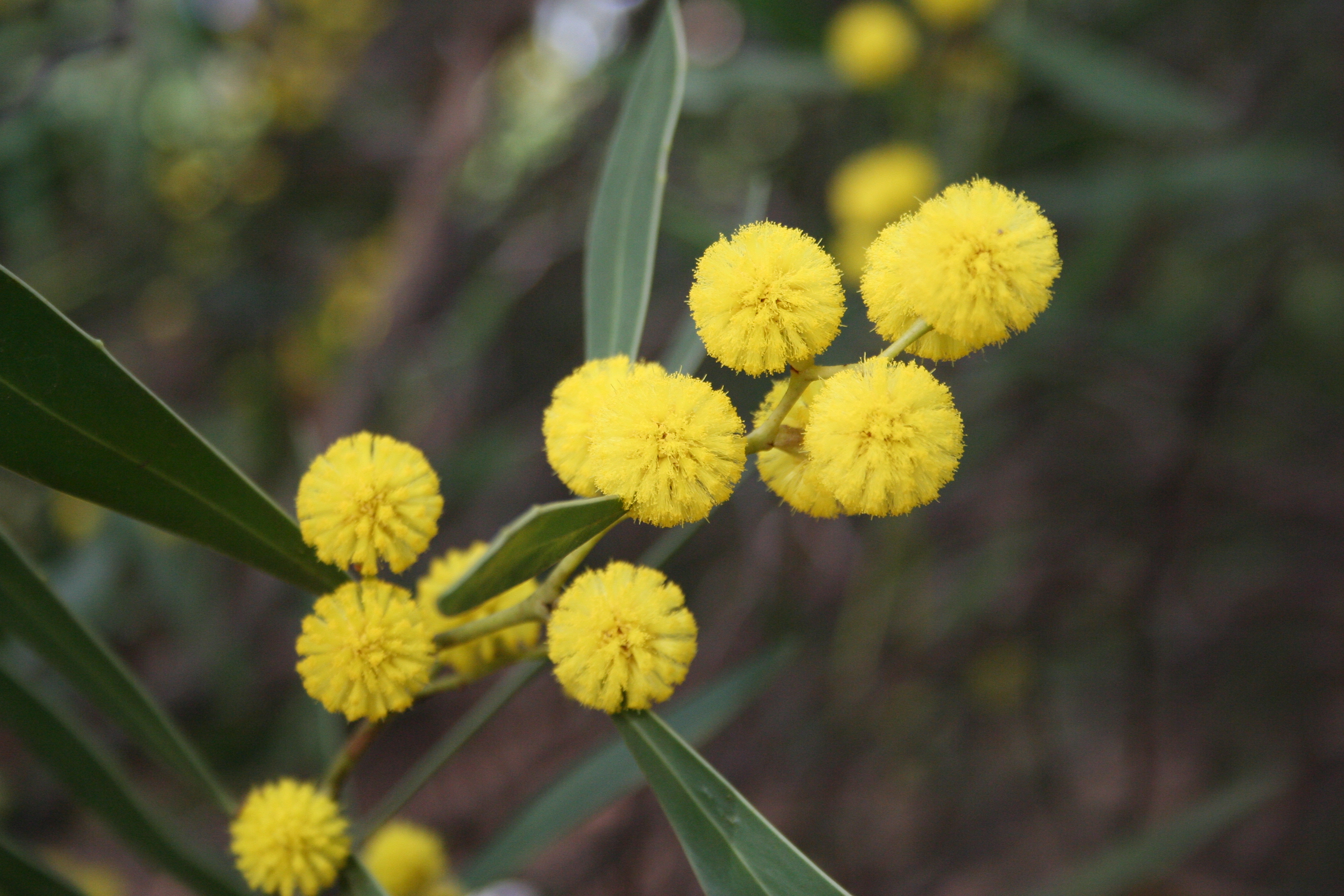
- Barrier Range wattle in Maranoa Gardens

Scientific classification
- Kingdom: Plantae
- Clade: Tracheophytes
- Clade: Angiosperms
- Clade: Eudicots
- Clade: Rosids
- Order: Fabales
- Family: Fabaceae
- Subfamily: Caesalpinioideae
- Clade: Mimosoid clade
- Genus: Acacia
- Species: A. beckleri

Binomial name
- Acacia beckleri Tindale
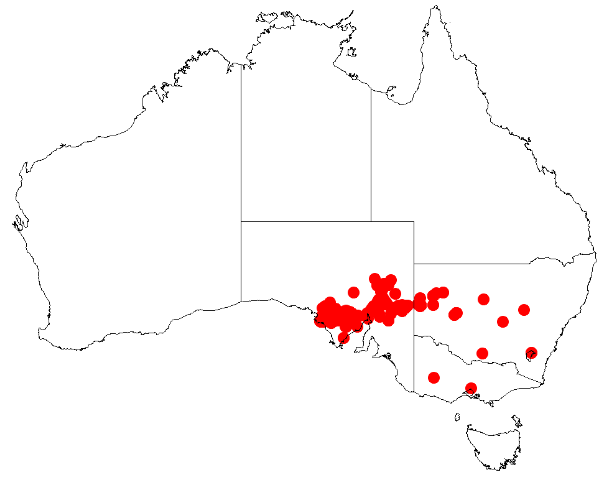
- Occurrence data from Australasian Virtual Herbarium

Synonyms
- Racosperma beckleri (Tindale) Pedley; Acacia gladiiformis auct. non A.Cunn. ex Benth.: Black, J.M. (1924); Acacia notabilis auct. non F.Muell.: Bentham, G. (1864)

= Acacia beckleri =

Species of plant

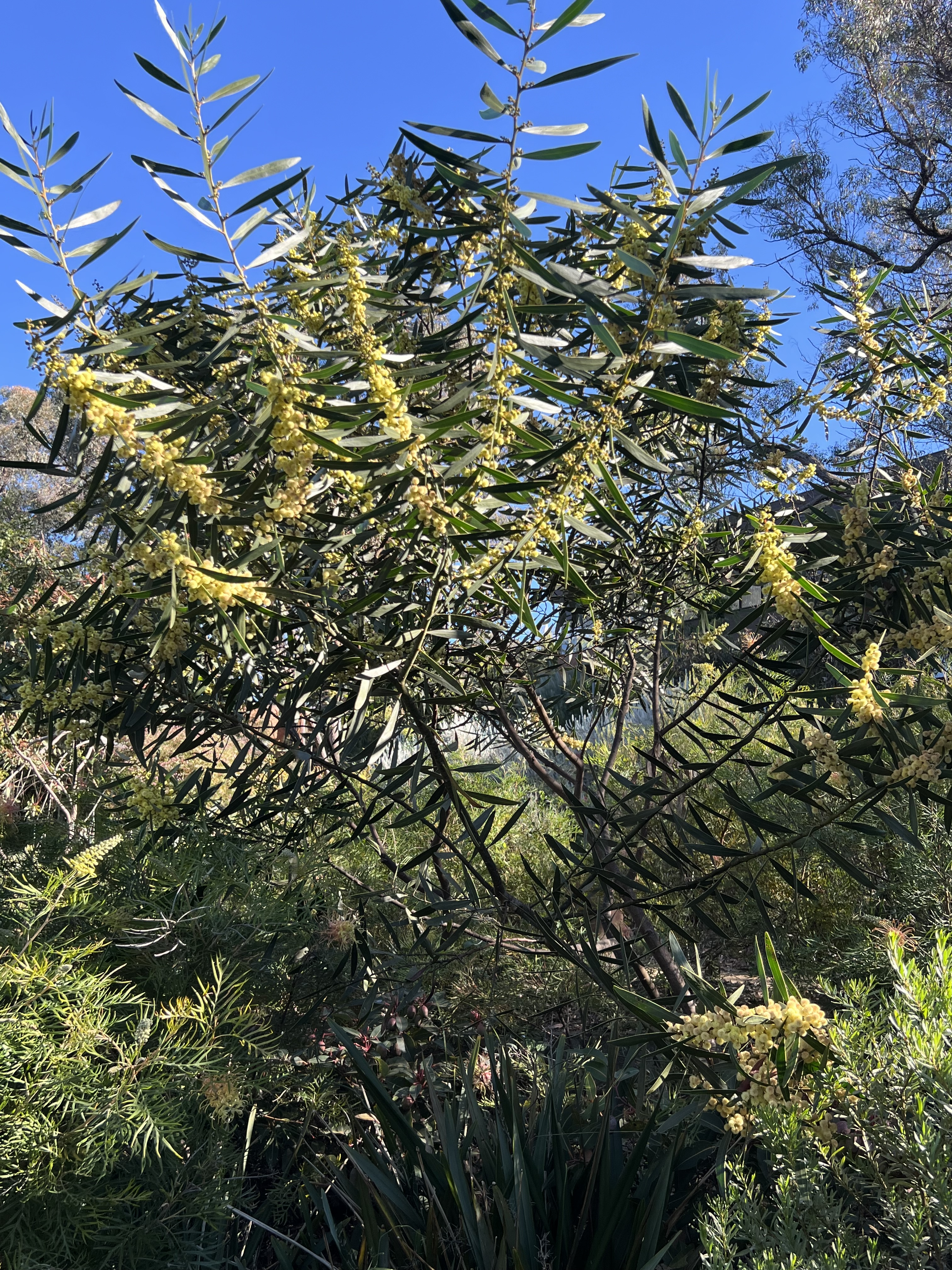
Habit in the Australian National Botanic Gardens

Acacia beckleri commonly known as Barrier Range wattle, is a species of flowering plant in the family Fabaceae. It is an upright or spreading shrub with green or bluish-green leaves and spherical heads of yellow flowers.

== Description ==
Acacia beckleri is a decumbent, spreading or upright shrub 1–3 m (3 ft 3 in – 9 ft 10 in) high with reddish-brown stems and branches. The phyllodes are lance-shaped with the narrower end towards the base, or narrowly elliptic, straight or slightly curved. The phyllodes are green to pale green, faintly veined, 6–20 cm (2.4–7.9 in) long and 5–25 mm (0.20–0.98 in) wide, tapering at the base and rounded or pointed at the end. The flowers are usually borne in spherical heads on a peduncle mostly 2–7 mm (0.079–0.276 in) long, the heads 8–15 mm (0.31–0.59 in) in diameter with 50 to 140 dark yellow or golden-yellow flowers. Flowering occurs from May to August and the fruit is a straight, flat, reddish-brown pod, mostly straight-sided to barely constricted between the seeds.

== Taxonomy and naming ==
Barrier Range wattle was first formally described in 1965 by Mary Tindale and the description was published in the Supplement to J.M.Black's Flora of South Australia (Second Edition, 1943-1957). It is named after Dr Hermann Beckler, the botanist on the Burke and Wills expedition in 1861, who collected the type specimen in a "glen to the gorge Nothungbulla, Hodgson's Basin, near the Barrier Range.

In 2008, Martin C. O'Leary described Acacia beckleri subsp. megaspherica, and the name, and that of the autonym are accepted by the Australian Plant Census:

- Acacia beckleri Tindale subsp. beckleri (the autonym), has peduncles 1–2 mm (0.039–0.079 in) wide and 4–7 mm (0.16–0.28 in) long, and 54 to 67 flowers in each head.
- Acacia beckleri subsp. megaspherica O'Leary has peduncles 2–4 mm (0.079–0.157 in) wide and 2–4 mm (0.079–0.157 in) long, and 80 to 140 flowers in each head.

== Distribution and habitat ==
Acacia beckleri grows mainly on slopes in shallow soils on the Eyre Peninsula and east to the Olary Ranges, in the Gammon Ranges and Barrier Range in South Australia and near Cobar and Jerilderie in western New South Wales. Subspecies megaspherica is only found in South Australia in the Gammon Ranges and Mount Hack, and south through Wilpena Pound.

== Use in horticulture ==
This plant can be propagated by seed and probably also by cuttings.

== See also ==
- List of Acacia species
