= John Barton Hack =

English early settler in South Australia (1805–1884)

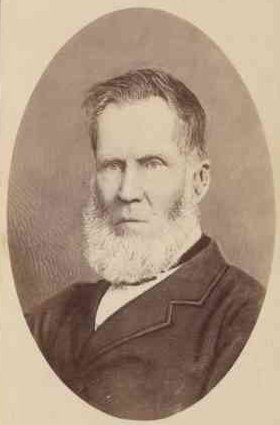
- Hack, c. 1870
- Born: July 2, 1805; Chichester, England
- Died: October 4, 1884 (aged 79); Semaphore, South Australia
- Resting place: Cheltenham Cemetery, South Australia
- Occupations: Settler; farmer; businessman; accountant
- Known for: Early settler and pioneer of South Australia
- Spouse: Bridget Watson (m. 1827; died 1881)
- Children: At least 12, including Theodore Hack
- Parent(s): Stephen Hack; Maria Hack
- Relatives: Stephen Hack (brother); Wilton Hack (nephew); Bernard Barton (uncle)

John Barton Hack (2 July 1805 – 4 October 1884), generally referred to as Barton Hack, was an early settler in South Australia; a prominent farmer, businessman and public figure. He lost his fortune in the financial crisis of 1840 and despite his best efforts, never regained anything like his former influence and prosperity. His son Theodore Hack, younger brother Stephen Hack and nephew Wilton Hack were all figures of some significance in the history of the Colony.

== Early life ==
Hack was born in Chichester, England to Stephen Hack, a banker, and the educational writer Maria Hack (née Barton), sister of the poet Bernard Barton. He was educated at Southgate, Middlesex before going into the leather trade, building up a business in Sussex. On 9 July 1827, Hack married Bridget "Bbe" Watson (27 September 1806 – 20 July 1881), daughter of William Watson of Hardshaw, Lancashire. After an illness which affected his lungs, he was advised to move to a warmer climate.

== South Australia ==
While in Portsmouth he met Captain Thomas Lipson, who was fitting out the Buffalo for its pioneering voyage to South Australia. This new colony captured his imagination. He read Robert Torrens's book The Colonization of South Australia and met with Edward Gibbon Wakefield and some members of the South Australian Company and was so convinced of the colony's future that he sold up his considerable business interests and purchased three 134-acre sections with their three accompanying town acres.

In September 1836 he embarked with his wife, six children and younger brother Stephen (who was to become an explorer of some note and father of Wilton Hack), on the Isabella, commanded by Captain Hart for the owner Griffiths of Launceston, Van Diemen's Land. A surprise last-minute addition to the passenger list was Sir John Jeffcott, who had been appointed Chief Justice of South Australia, and was "slipping away" surreptitiously to avoid creditors. The Isabella's first stop in Australia was Launceston, where he spent a month purchasing livestock and equipment, which were loaded on the Isabella for shipping to South Australia. His purchases included nearly 400 sheep, six cows and a bull, ten bullocks, a large wagon and a dray, three horses and a Timor pony. Another livestock importer from Launceston aboard the Isabella was Henry Jones (1799–1889), son of a prosperous London oil merchant, and, like Hack, an influential colonist.

== From carting to farming ==
Arriving at Holdfast Bay (again on the Isabella, whose captain was the future South Australian Premier John Hart) in February 1837, his goods and livestock were unloaded, but by an oversight the sheep dispersed and were never recovered. He set up the two prefabricated two-room "Manning's Portable Cottages" he had loaded at Portsmouth; one at Glenelg and one in Adelaide, on the site of the present Railway Station. The bullock wagon was kept busy, carting goods between Holdfast Bay and Adelaide, making £15 in the first week apart from his own work. He was supplying milk (he purchased, for £27 a head, a herd of cows that were subsequently landed from South Africa) and, with his gardener, developing a garden in North Adelaide. In March 1837, at the beginning of the first land sales in Adelaide, Hack purchased a further sixty acres (24 hectares). In May he lost another consignment of sheep and cattle when the Isabella foundered on rocks off Cape Nelson. He built a more substantial residence in Hindley Street, which a few years later the Government purchased for conversion into a police station. He purchased 1,000 acres (400 ha) on the Little Para River for a dairy, and produced butter for sale in the city.

He undertook some exploration of the country around Adelaide. On 27 November 1837, guided by his stockman Tom Davis, Hack in company with John Morphett, Samuel Stephens, Charles Stuart (South Australian Company's stock overseer), and John Wade (a "gentleman from Hobart Town"), were the first Europeans to ascend Mount Barker.

Hack also became involved in public life, sitting on the Street Naming Committee, which decided the names of streets that now run through Adelaide city centre and North Adelaide, as well as the Chamber of Commerce and several other bodies. As part of his business ventures, he was paid £800 for cutting the original channel in Port Adelaide. In 1838, he purchased Blenkinsop's whaling station at Encounter Bay (Blenkinsop had drowned with Sir John Jeffcott at the Murray Mouth the previous December). He squatted 400 head of cattle at Mount Barker, but was moved on in 1839. Not put off, he then bought 4,000 acres (1,600 hectares) of land at nearby Echunga Springs and made his home there. His farming venture was initially very successful and it was at this time that he planted some of the first wine-grape vines in the colony. A drawing of his farm by George French Angas, possibly from a sketch by Gawler may be viewed here. (A similar hand-tinted lithograph by J. Hitchen used by Gawler to support his strategy of attracting wealthy immigrants can be viewed here)

In 1839 he had formed the shipping agency Hack, Watson and Co. with brother-in-law Henry Watson, and spent much of his time and energy travelling between his home at Echunga and Port Adelaide.

== The Recession and after ==
South Australia was plunged into an economic depression in 1841 when the South Australian Company repudiated debts incurred by Governor Gawler. Hack had numerous creditors who could not pay him, debts to the bank, workers to pay and other ongoing commitments with little coming in and no support from his bank. He was forced to sell his Echunga property and whaling interests at a huge discount. His shipping company ceased trading in 1842 and its assets were taken over by their U.K. manager, Jacob Hagen. Through Hack's efforts, a position was found for Watson as Chief Clerk in the Customs Department.

In 1843, with little or no capital, Hack made a living with a bullock team, which he expanded in 1845 with several bullock drays carting copper ore from the new mines at Burra to Port Adelaide and living at Kapunda. He undertook several prospective diggings but found no minable copper. By 1848, he had interests in a timber business associated with the building of Christ Church in North Adelaide, but the death of the contractor and the loss of his workers to the Bendigo goldfields resulted in another business failure. In 1851 he went to the Victorian goldfields, where he was modestly successful and returned to South Australia, where he was engaged as mercantile manager for the solicitor Atkinson (who he left in 1852), then with Hart and Hughes of Port Adelaide. In 1859 he purchased a dairy farm along the Coorong, which proved uneconomical. He tried sheep-farming in partnership with G. M. Brown but footrot caused unsupportable losses and in 1863 the family returned to Adelaide. He worked as accountant for Henry Hill & Co., then John Rounsevell, then as an independent agent. Finally he was employed as an accountant for the South Australian Railways from 1870 to 1883, when he retired, having reached the position of Controller of Railway Accounts.

== Religion and social concerns ==
Hack was brought up as a Quaker, and many of the Adelaide church's first meetings were held at his home. He donated land on Pennington Terrace, North Adelaide, and contracted for erection there of the Friends’ meeting house, a prefabricated wooden building from the same H. Manning, which is still in use. One of his children, who died in infancy, was buried in its yard. He converted to Wesleyan Methodism in Kapunda around 1845 and later was active in church finance committees and management committee of Prince Alfred College. He was noted for his friendliness to Aboriginals and ex-convicts (notably one Jack Foley, who became a trusted employee to the extent of accompanying Stephen Hack to London in 1840), and as a temperance advocate. He was a firm friend and mentor of Henry Inman.

Hack died at his home in Semaphore on 4 October 1884; his wife having died three years earlier.

== Family ==
On 9 July 1827 Hack married Bridget "Bbe" Watson (27 September 1806 – 20 July 1881). They produced at least twelve children, including eight sons and four daughters. The first six were born in England.

- William Barton Hack (28 April 1828 – 3 February 1903) married Grace Stanlake (1833 – September 1860) (Note: Stanlake arrived aboard the brig Raven in Adelaide in October 1846. According to one report she was born Grace Talling.) c. 1852. Their children include:

- Mary Louisa Hack (1853–1881) married Walter Henry Earl (died 1881) in 1875 He was teacher at Melrose from 1873 or earlier. Their children included:

- Daughter 21 May 1876 — nothing in the newspapers, but it is likely she did not survive.
- Son 9 November 1877 — nothing in the newspapers, but it is likely he did not survive.
- Mary Eliza Earl (14 September 1879 – 25 June 1880) died aged 10 months.
Husband and wife died 1881.
- Elsie Miriam Earl (29 May 1881 – 1976) was adopted by Theodore Hack, and was henceforth known as Elsie Miriam Earl Hack or Elsie M. Hack. She was a student at Knightsbridge School and became a fine pianist and singer. She married John Arthur Ballantyne (1873 – 10 October 1942), son of James Ballantyne of Dulwich, on 7 August 1907, lived in Wayville, South Australia. An adoptive sister married a brother of John Arthur Ballantyne.

- Annie Catherine Hack (c. 1854 – March 1931) married August C. Wagener ( –1899) in 1874
- Barton John Hack (1856 – 25 August 1944) married Christina Anderson in 1884. They had one daughter

- Irene Ethel Hack married Francis Godolphin Bonython in 1904

- Julia Emily Hack (8 December 1857 – 2 July 1943) married Frederick Percy Ritchie ( – ) on 3 August 1878.
- Arthur William Hack or William Arthur Hack (August 1859 – c. 1 June 1929) married Annie in 1881.

- Arthur Herbert Hack (c. March 1881 – 17 April 1882)

He married again, to Emma Harding (13 March 1846 – 1929) in 1865, was a farmer and grazier at Stewart's Range near Naracoorte.
- Charles Henry Hack (7 August 1865 – 16 September 1952)
- Wilton Robson Hack (2 April 1867 – 17 November 1938) married Catherine McLeod in 1904
- Jessie Emma Hack (25 September 1869 – 21 December 1932) married Charles Beauchamp in 1895
- Theodore William Hack (25 December 1873 – 1969) and six others.

- Edward Hack (1829 – 25 September 1904) was a carter, surveyor, storekeeper and Primitive Methodist local preacher.
- Annie Mary Hack (1830 – 17 February 1839)
- Louisa Hack (1831 – 7 August 1865) married Patrick James Tod (died 30 May 1855) on 20 January 1849; married Kingston Linden, of Plymouth, England.
- Alfred Hack (1833 – 7 June 1908) auctioneer and commission agent, married Susan Pengilly on 25 October 1870

- Frederick Theodore "Fred T." Hack (24 August 1877 – 10 April 1939) cricketer, motor body builder; his business at 400 King William Street was taken over by Holden's. He married Rosa Pengilly (died 25 September 1940) on 17 April 1905.

- Alfred Thomas "Alf" Hack (12 June 1905 – 4 February 1933) cricketer, known as wicket keeper
- (Norman) Reginald Hack (25 February 1907 – 13 October 1971) cricketer, L.H. batsman

- Bedford Hack (10 August 1835 – 26 April 1912) worked in the Surveyor-General's Department and was manager of the Sewerage Farm.
- Emily Margaret Hack (1837 – 7 January 1873) married Cornelius Butler Mitchell on 29 August 1860.
- Theodore Hack MHA (17 November 1840 – 27 December 1902) married Elvira Louisa Ansell (c. 1842 – 7 October 1890) on 17 November 1864. See his entry for family details.
- Charles Hack (30 May 1842 – 22 April 1915) married Anne Brooks Meyrick (1844 – 24 October 1929) on 27 December 1866. He was a tenor in several important choirs.

- Gulielma "Guli" Hack (17 October 1867 – 2 August 1951) married William Magarey on 5 March 1910. She was a noted singer and pianist, Elder Overseas Scholarship winner, taught at the Elder Conservatorium.
- Ethel May Hack (19 July 1869 – 4 September 1947) married Bruce Malcolm (January 1869 – 2 May 1941) on 9 January 1902. She was a contralto and piano accompanist. Malcolm was born in Gawler, they ran Avondale station, Pittsworth, Queensland, then Coonabarabran, later of 2 Erith Street Mosman, New South Wales. They had two children: Joy and Bruce.
Guli and Ethel lived at 58 South Terrace, Adelaide, and as "The Misses Hack" taught languages and music to small children at Miller Street, North Unley 1900–1902, then 1903–1906 Guli taught at Rose Terrace, Wayville.
- Louisa Emily Hack (1872–1946)
- (Charles) Gerald Hack (1874–1936) married Dorothy Langridge on 16 February 1916.
- Leonard Hack (1876 – 10 July 1912) married Hilda Kyffin Thomas (2 April 1878 – 1947) on 28 July 1906. Hilda was a daughter of Robert Kyffin Thomas.
- Winifred Bbe (Note: This is not a typographical error. "Bbe" was a name given to, or adopted by, several members of the Hack family and reported without comment in Chequered Lives, the biography of the Hack family of South Australia.) Hack (1879–1968) married Arthur Bellendes Skottowe ( –1923) in 1903
- Noel Meyrick Hack (1881–1957) married Guelda Lillian Muecke (1889–1963) in 1910. She was a granddaughter of H. C. E. Muecke.
- Dulcie Barton Hack (1886–1963) married Percy William Hardie Marshall (1883–1944) in 1914. Percy was a son of Rundle Street merchant James Marshall.
- Lionel Watson Hack (1889–1921) married Adela Gwen Hill (1891–1970) in 1916

- Francis "Frank" Hack (4 December 1843 – 17 August 1903) was a prominent member of the South Australian Literary Societies' Union.
- George Hack (27 May 1845 – ) married Elizabeth Ann Johns ( –1948) in 1869
- Jessie Maria Hack (20 July 1848 – 31 March 1867)

At least three of his sons received tuition at J. L. Young's Adelaide Educational Institution: between December 1854 and December 1857, Theodore, Charles and Frank figured prominently at prizegivings, as did their cousin Wilton (1843–1923).
