= Andrew Gow =

Andrew Gow may refer to:

- Andrew Gow (historian) (fl. 1990s–2020s), Canadian historian of medieval and early modern Europe
- Andrew Carrick Gow (1848–1920), British painter
- Andrew Jonathan Gow (born 1978), English artist best known for portraiture
- A. S. F. Gow (Andrew Sydenham Farrar Gow, 1886–1978), English classical scholar and teacher
