= Hax =

Hax or HAX may refer to:

== People ==
- Carolyn Hax (born 1966), American advice columnist
- Georg Hax (1870–1952), German water polo player; competed in water polo at the 1900 Summer Olympics
- Heinrich Hax (1900–1969), German modern pentathlete and sport shooter and Iron Cross recipient
- Mike Hax (born 1970), German judoka

== Other uses ==
- HAX Accelerator, a seed accelerator in Shenzhen, China
- hax, ISO 639-3 code of the Southern Haida language, spoken in Canada and the United States
- HAX, IATA airport code and FALL location identifier Hatbox Field, a closed airfield in Muskogee, Oklahoma, United States

== See also ==
- Hacks (disambiguation)
