= RootedCON =

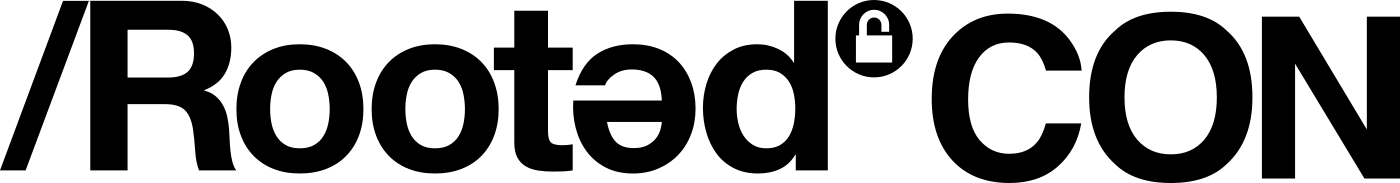
- Status: Active
- Genre: Cybersecurity conference
- Frequency: Annual
- Venue: Kinépolis Madrid
- Location: Madrid
- Country: Spain
- Years active: 2010–present
- Website: Official website

RootedCON is an annual cybersecurity and technology conference held in Madrid, Spain since 2010. The organization has also arranged events in other cities such as Málaga, Valencia, Lisbon, and Panama, often in collaboration with initiatives such as the STIC conferences organized by Spain’s national CERT (Computer Emergency Response Team). RootedCON is regarded by the specialized press as one of the most relevant cybersecurity events in the Spanish-speaking world. The conference brings together leading experts, industry professionals, law enforcement agencies, technology companies, and ethical hacking enthusiasts.

== History ==
The first edition of RootedCON was held in 2010 with the goal of promoting the exchange of technical knowledge in cybersecurity and building a local hacker community in Spain. Since then, the event has gradually grown in number of attendees, scope, and international reputation, establishing itself as a reference point within European cybersecurity

== Format ==
RootedCON Madrid runs for three days and combines technical lectures with hands-on workshops such as RootedLabs and BootCamps, held before the main conference. In addition, the event offers complementary activities such as HackerNight.

As of 2021, the number of participants exceeds 8,000 at the Madrid edition and totals around 20,000 annually across all events.

== Speakers ==
Over the years, the event has featured both national and international speakers, such as Mikko Hyppönen, Paul Vixie, John Hammond, Hugo Teso and Chema Alonso, as well as independent researchers and representatives from technology companies, police forces, and government institutions

== See also ==
- Computer security
- Hacking
