= Theodore Hack =

Australian politician (1840–1902)

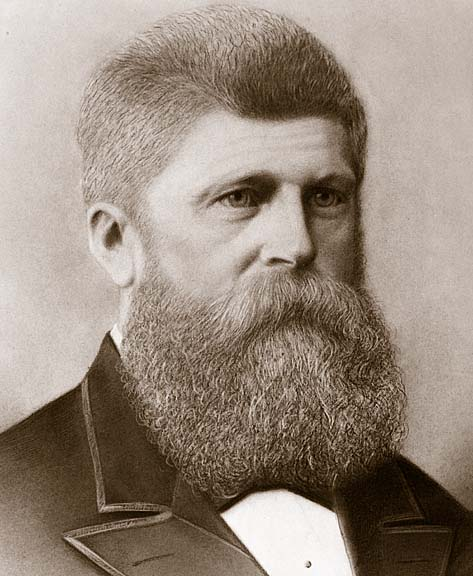

Member of the South Australian House of Assembly for Gumeracha
- In office 1890–1893

Personal details
- Born: 17 November 1840 Echunga, South Australia
- Died: 27 December 1902 (aged 62)

Theodore Hack (17 November 1840 – 27 December 1902) was a South Australian politician.

He was born at Echunga, South Australia, a son of John Barton Hack and his wife Bridget Hack, née Watson, and was educated at the Adelaide Educational Institution.

Hack was by turns landing officer at Semaphore, harbormaster at Port Willunga, clerk with the Engineer-in-Chief's Department, railway storekeeper, timber merchant (with his sister-in-law Stella Ann Robin after the death of her husband Theophilus Robin), then valuer and architect. He was member of the Port Adelaide council (and for two years its mayor) and the first mayor of Semaphore, as well as a member of the House of Assembly, representing Gumeracha between 1890 and 1893.

Hack was a judge at the Adelaide Jubilee International Exhibition in 1887, a member of the Central Roads' Board and the Fire Brigades' Board, a lay preacher for the Methodist Church and active with several Methodist organisations. He was president of the Local Teachers' Association, the governing body of Prince Alfred College, chairman and treasurer of the Prisoners' Aid Society and an active member of the Chamber of Manufacturers. He died of Bright's disease, from which he had suffered for some time.

== Family ==
Theodore Hack married Elvira Louisa Ansell (c. 1842 – 7 October 1890) on 17 November 1864. Their children included:

- Ernest Barton Hack (13 May 1867 – 27 March 1936) married Isabelle Maddison (c. 1870–1949) of Glenelg some time after 1890. He was a chess enthusiast and architect of Coolgardie, Western Australia, had pyrrhic victory in WA Supreme Court 1898, moved to Kew, Victoria.
- Harold Ansell Hack (2 July 1869 – 6 February 1937) married Maud May Southward in Coolgardie, Western Australia on 14 September 1900.
- Emily Bbe (Note: This is not a typographical error. "Bbe" was a name given to, or adopted by, several members of the Hack family and reported without comment in Chequered Lives, the biography of the Hack family of South Australia.) Hack (1871 – 20 June 1952) married James Fergusson Ballantyne (1868–1929), son of James Ballantyne, in 1901, lived in Glenburnie, South Australia.
- (Theodore) Bernard Hack (26 February 1873 – ) moved to Tasmania
- Stella Ellie Hack (12 January 1875 – 1957) lived in Wayville, South Australia.
- Clement Alfred Hack (17 March 1877 – 8 June 1930) was a prominent patent attorney in Victoria.
- Wilfred Hack (1879–1879)
- Roy Darton Hack (7 February 1882 Adelaide – 1966 Armadale, Vic.)

They adopted Elsie Miriam Earl (1881–1976), who was known for some time as Elsie Miriam Earl Hack. She was a student at Knightsbridge School and a fine pianist and singer. She married John Arthur Ballantyne (1873–1942), son of James Ballantyne, on 7 August 1907, lived in Wayville, South Australia. Step-sisters marrying brothers.

Hack married again, to Elizabeth Jane Almers, née Nancarrow (1858–1914) in Adelaide, in 1898.
