= Louise Pragnell =

British painter (born 1981)

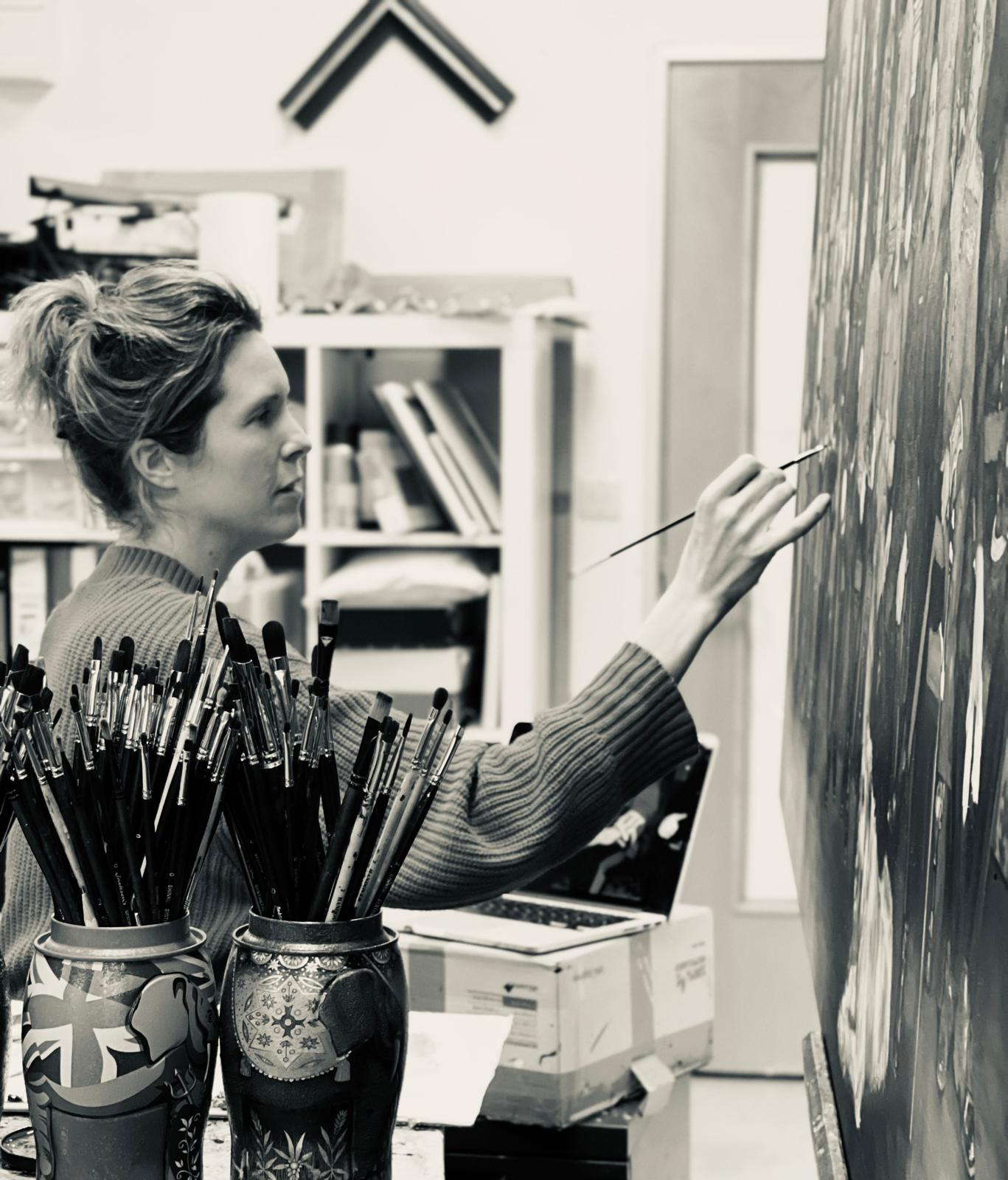
- Born: 1981 (age 44–45)
- Education: University of Edinburgh, Edinburgh College of Art
- Notable work: Prince Edward, Duke of Kent; Anne, Princess Royal; Guillaume V, Grand Duke of Luxembourg; Stéphanie, Grand Duchess of Luxembourg
- Website: louisepragnell.com

Louise Pragnell (born 1981 in Warwickshire) is a London-based British contemporary portrait artist. Her work ranges from intimate individual commissions to ambitious, large-scale group portraits.

In October 2025 she painted a full length portrait of the Princess Royal unveiled at Worshipful Company of Saddlers. Alongside Luxembourgish painter Roland Schauls and British painter Andrew Jonathan Gow she painted one of the official paintings of Grand Duke Guillaume of Luxembourg as well as of Grand Duchess Stéphanie.

== Life and work ==
Pragnell studied MA Fine Art at the University of Edinburgh and Edinburgh College of Art, graduating with Distinction in Painting and was the recipient of the Andrew Grant Bequest scholarship. She then completed further training in classical oil painting techniques in Italy, at the Florence Academy of Art and Rebecca Harp's portrait atelier.

Her work is characterised by her classical technique and modern sensibility. Working exclusively in oil on canvas, she employs traditional methods while bringing a contemporary relevance and vitality to her subjects.

== Notable portraits ==
=== Oil portraits ===
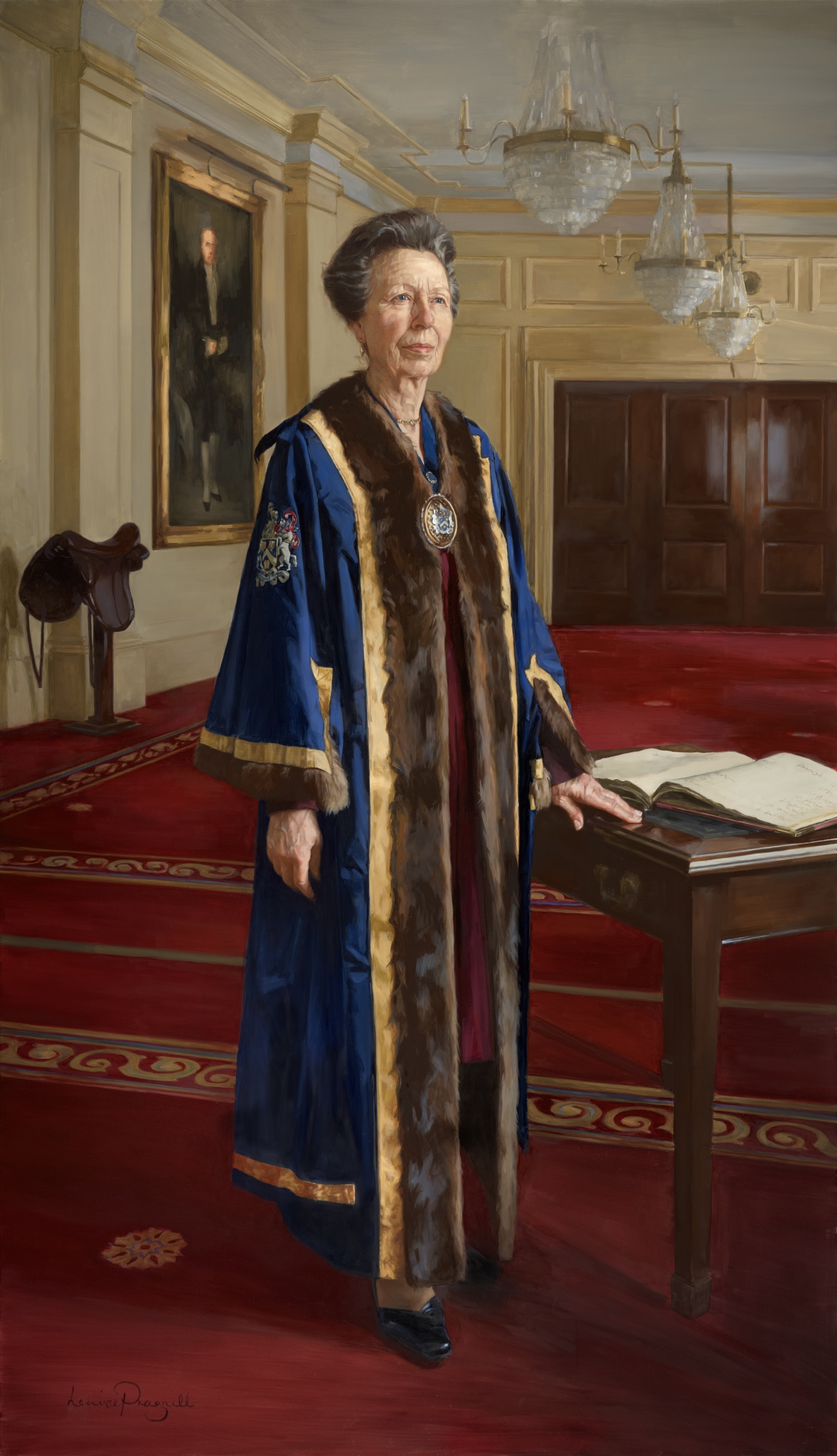
Anne, Princess Royal (2025)

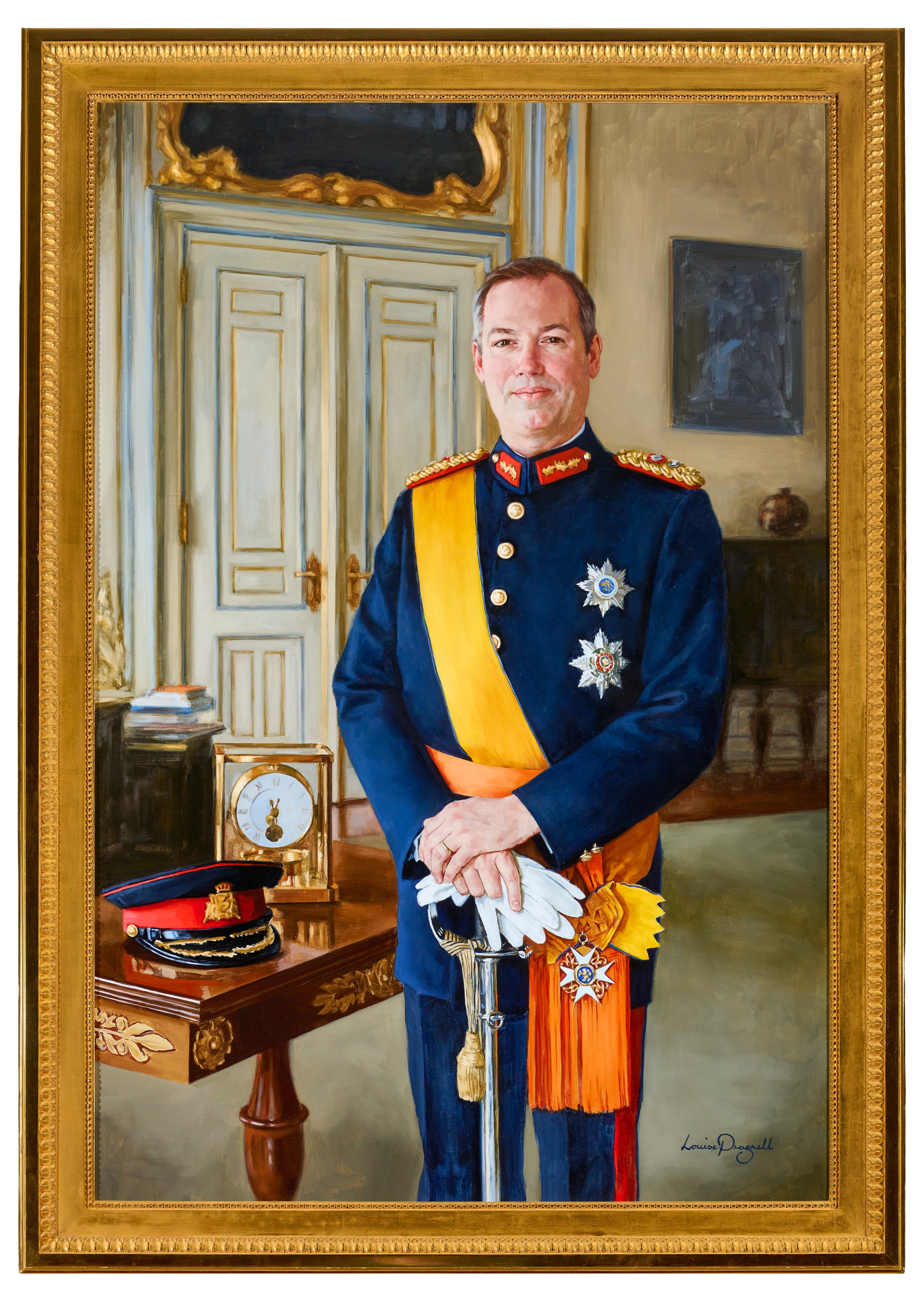
Grand Duke Guillaume V…

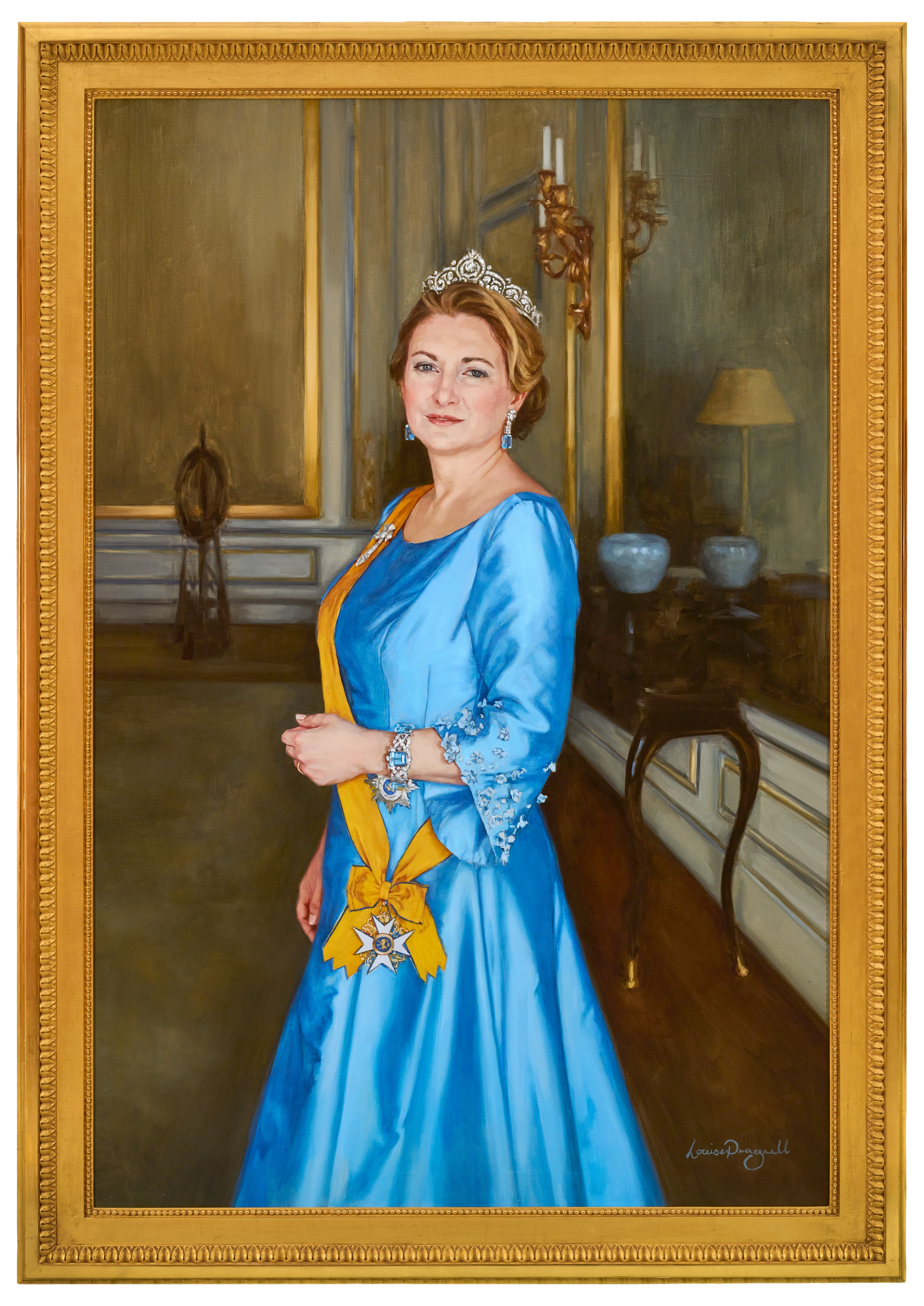
and Grand Duchess Stéphanie of Luxembourg

- 2010: The Household Cavalry, Group portrait of 25 Officers (100 cm × 300 cm), unveiled by HRH the Princess Royal, at Hyde Park Barracks, Knightsbridge London
- 2011: Tim Gosling as The Evil, Murdering, Misguided Queen Cassandra
- 2012: General Sir Nicholas Houghton, former Chief of Defence Staff, British Armed Forces
- 2014: HRH the Duke of Kent, Cavalry and Guards Club, Piccadilly
- 2014: General Sir Peter Wall, former Chief of General Staff
- 2015: General Sir Jim Hockenhull KBE Strategic Command, UK, Intelligence Corps
- 2015: Royal St. George's Golf Club, a triptych of group portraits commissioned to mark the 125th anniversary of the founding of Royal St. George's
- 2020: Portraits for NHS Heroes. Dr. Jim Down, (Leading Covid ICU consultant and BBC correspondent)
- 2022: As resident artist at the iconic music venue Koko, Louise produced a painting of The Patron's evening. Patrons depicted in the piece include Olivia Coleman, Keith Tyson, Elisabeth Murdoch, Mat Collishaw, live sketching during performances
- 2023: The Irish Guards, Group portrait of 32 officers of the Irish Guards 2nd Battallion, (100 cm × 300 cm), presented to TRHs the Prince and Princess of Wales on St' Patrick's Day 2023
- 2023: William Hague, Baron Hague of Richmond, Royal United Services Institute
- 2024: Jeremy Clarkson, English television presenter and journalist
- 2025: Sir Jackie Stewart, commissioned by the Royal Automobile Club, was unveiled in May 2025.
- 2025: HRH the Princess Royal, full length portrait (250 cm × 100 cm), commissioned by the Worshipful Company of Saddlers, London, unveiled January 2025
- 2025: TRHs the Grand Duke and Grand Duchess of Luxembourg
- 2026: David Stewart, former manager of British Grove Studios (posthumous)
- 2026: HRH the Princess Royal, commissioned by the Intelligence Corps, displayed at the Worshipful Company of Painter-Stainers

== Exhibitions ==
- 2011: National Portrait Gallery - BP Portrait Award with The Evil, Murdering, Misguided Queen Cassandra
- 2012: National Portrait Gallery - BP Portrait Awards with Tom, Waiting
