= Chema Alonso =

Spanish computer-security researcher and executive (born 1975)

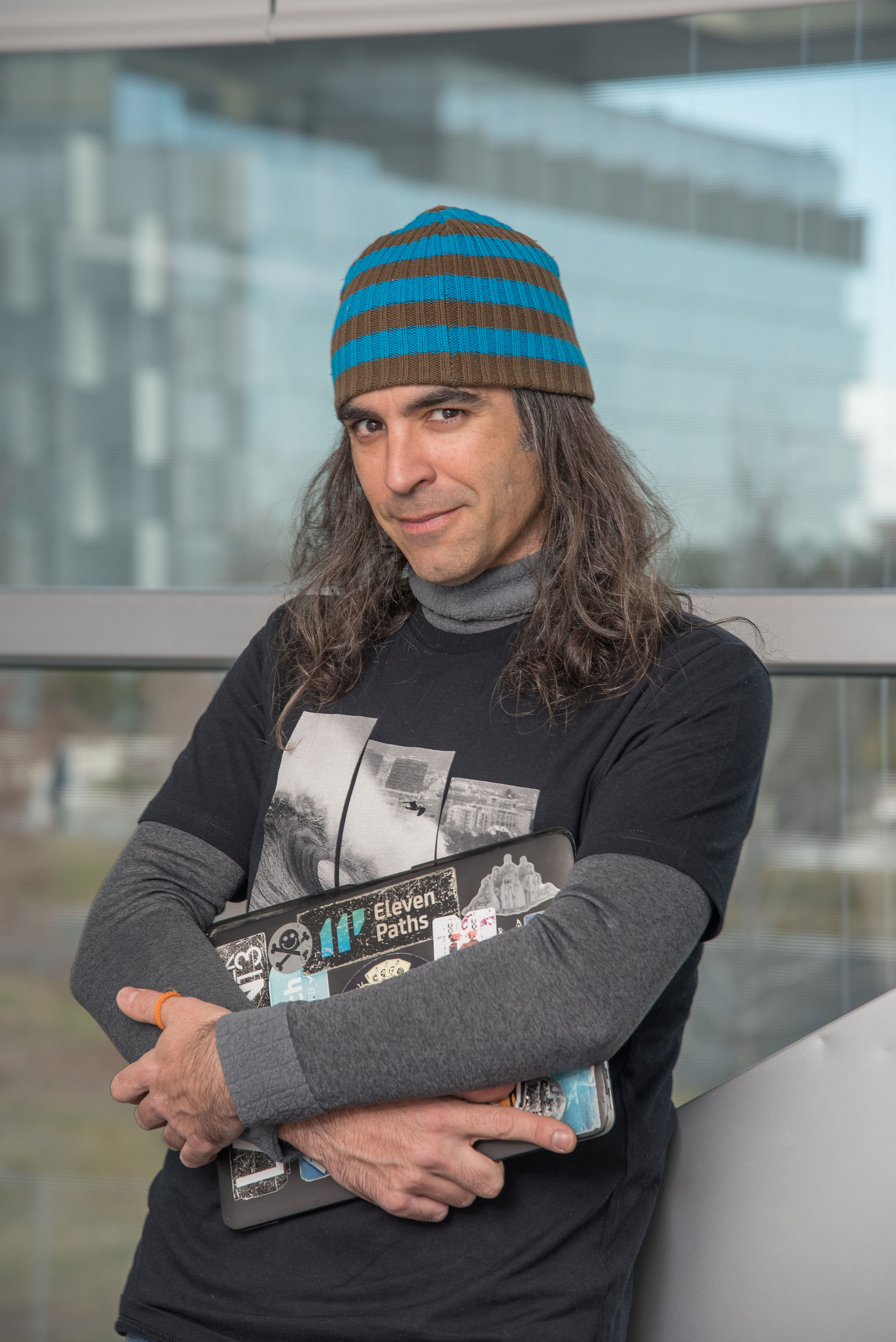
- Alonso speaking at a cyber‑security conference in 2019
- Born: José María Alonso Cebrián; 1975 (age 50–51); Madrid, Spain
- Education: Polytechnic University of Madrid (BEng); Rey Juan Carlos University (MSc, PhD)
- Occupations: Computer‑security researcher; technology executive
- Known for: ElevenPaths; FOCA metadata tool; Latch app; Cloudflare executive
- Awards: Civil Guard Cross of Merit (2017); Forbes World’s 50 Most Influential CMOs (2022)
- Website: elladodelmal.com

José María "Chema" Alonso Cebrián (born 1975) is a Spanish computer‑security researcher and technology executive. He led Telefónica's cybersecurity unit ElevenPaths in 2013 and later served on the company's executive committee as Chief Data Officer and Chief Digital Officer between 2016 and 2025.

In August 2025, Alonso joined Cloudflare as vice president and head of international development. Alonso is a frequent speaker at international security conferences (including Black Hat, DEF CON and Troopers). He has worked on connection-string parameter pollution and has been involved in tools such as the FOCA metadata-analysis suite and the Latch “digital padlock” app.

== Early life and education ==
Alonso was born in 1975 and grew up in Móstoles, in Community of Madrid, Spain He holds a B.Eng. in Computer Systems Engineering from the Polytechnic University of Madrid and an M.Sc./Ph.D. in Computer Security from the Rey Juan Carlos University.

== Career ==
=== Informática 64 and ElevenPaths (1999–2016) ===
In June 2013, Telefónica created the cyber‑security unit ElevenPaths and appointed Alonso as its Chief Executive; the new unit drew staff from his earlier consultancy Informática 64. At ElevenPaths, he increased awareness about tools and products such as the FOCA (Fingerprinting Organizations with Collected Archives) metadata‑analysis suite, and Latch, a mobile “digital padlock” that lets users toggle access to online services.

=== Telefónica executive roles (2016–2025) ===
Alonso joined Telefónica's executive committee in 2016 as Chief Data Officer, later serving as Chief Digital Consumer Officer and then Chief Digital Officer. In this period, he spoke publicly about returning control of personal data to users and Telefónica's “fourth platform”. From 2023, he was a prominent executive voice around the GSMA Open Gateway programme, which exposes standardised network APIs; Telefónica and the GSMA announced deployments and partnerships during MWC Barcelona.

Telefónica was among the first large companies affected when the WannaCry ransomware attack began on 12 May 2017.

=== Cloudflare (2025–present) and CTA episode ===
In August 2025, Alonso joined Cloudflare as vice president, Head of International Development. The move was followed, two weeks later, by his resignation from an advisory role on artificial intelligence at Spain's Technical Committee of Referees (CTA).

== Research and selected projects ==
- DirtyTooth (2017): co‑disclosure of a Bluetooth issue affecting iOS whereby a paired speaker could switch from A2DP to PBAP and exfiltrate contacts without user awareness; presented at ToorCon 19.
- RansomCloud (2017–2018): a proof‑of‑concept demonstrating how a rogue OAuth application could encrypt email in cloud services such as Office 365 in real time, which was later popularised through demonstrations with Kevin Mitnick.

== Media ==
Alonso has appeared in Spanish‑language media as a subject-matter expert on cybersecurity topics, including demonstrations on the TV show El Hormiguero. He also hosted the 12‑episode web series Risk Alert (Atresmedia/Flooxer, 2018).

== Awards and honours ==
- Civil Guard Cross of Merit (Distintivo Blanco, 2017).
- Doctor Honoris Causa, Rey Juan Carlos University (2020).
- #16 on Forbes World’s 50 Most Influential CMOs list (2022).

== See also ==
- Telefónica
- Cloudflare
- DEF CON
- Black Hat Briefings
- RootedCON
