= Frederick Hack =

Australian cricketer (1877–1939)

Fred Hack
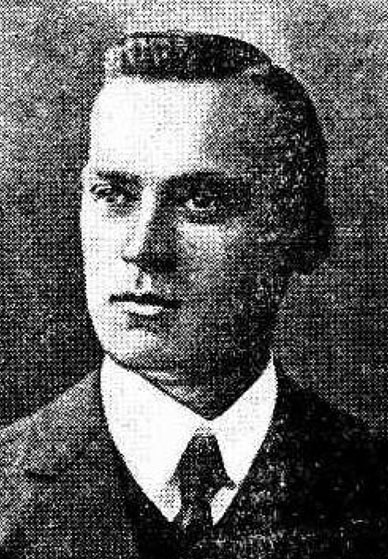

Personal information
- Full name: Frederick Theodore Hack
- Born: 24 August 1877; Aldinga, Adelaide, South Australia
- Died: 10 April 1939 (aged 61); Brisbane, Queensland, Australia
- Batting: Right-handed
- Relatives: Alfred Hack (son); Reginald Hack (son)

Domestic team information
- Years: Team
- 1898-99 to 1908-09: South Australia

Career statistics
Competition	First-class
Matches	39
Runs scored	2147
Batting average	29.41
100s/50s	3/11
Top score	158 not out
Balls bowled	596
Wickets	5
Bowling average	59.00
5 wickets in innings	0
10 wickets in match	0
Best bowling	2/39
Catches/stumpings	19/0
- Source: Cricinfo, 6 August 2019

Frederick Theodore Hack (24 August 1877 – 10 April 1939) was a cricketer who played first-class cricket for South Australia from 1898 to 1909.

An opening batsman, Hack scored 33, 115, 54, 37, 44 and 158 not out in the 1899-1900 Sheffield Shield, a total of 441 runs at an average of 88.20, putting him at the top of the Shield averages. The cricket writer A. G. Moyes said of Hack's career that he did "grand service for [South Australia] as an opening batsman. Standing a few inches over six feet, he was an extremely difficult man to dislodge once he dug in his heels. Never quite Test class, he was nevertheless a remarkably handy man for the ordinary first-class game." He continued playing senior cricket in Sydney into the 1920s.

For some years Hack was the managing director of his own company, F. T. Hack Limited, which manufactured automobiles in Adelaide. After he left Adelaide to take up business in Sydney in 1917, the company's premises were bought by Holden. In 1924 he was manager of the Missenden Road Body Building Works in the Sydney suburb of Camperdown.

Hack, who was a grandson of pioneer Barton Hack, married Rosa Pengilly in 1905. They had two daughters and two sons, Alfred and Reginald, both of whom played cricket for South Australia.
