= Andrew Jonathan Gow =

British portrait painter (born 1978)

- Born: 1978 (age 47–48); Surrey, England
- Education: Williams College
- Notable work: Cardinal George Pell; Guillaume V, Grand Duke of Luxembourg
- Website: andrewgow.co.uk

Gow's portrait of Grand Duke Guillaume V, which hangs in the plenary hall of the Chamber of Deputies of Luxembourg

Andrew Jonathan Gow (born 1978) is an English artist best known for portraiture. He is also a lecturer on painting and an instructor in the atelier method of drawing and painting from life.

Alongside Luxembourgish painter Roland Schauls and British painter Louise Pragnell, he has created in 2025/26 one of the official paintings of Grand Duke Guillaume of Luxembourg, displayed at the grand ducal palace in Luxembourg City.

== Life and work ==
Gow studied painting at Williams College, Massachusetts (1996 – 2000). He holds a BA (Hons) degree in history and studio art and honed his skills across the United States, Italy, France, and the UK.

He was visiting lecturer at Knightsbridge School, London (spring term 2014), at the Painting School/Sculpture School (Devon summer 2017) and at the London Atelier of Representational Art (LARA), from Spring 2013 to 2019).

== Notable portraits ==
=== Public commissions ===
- Grand Duke Guillaume V, Maison du Grand-Duc, Luxembourg, 2025
- Colonel Sir Malcolm Ross, Grand Prior, Order of St John, 2022
- Cardinal George Pell, Apostolic Palace Vatican City 2016
- Mr Ratan Tata, Asia House, London, 2013
- Mr John Henry Felix, Harris Manchester College, Oxford, 2012
- Lord and Lady Harris of Peckham, Harris Manchester College, Oxford, 2010
- Dr and Mrs Larry Tseu, Harris Manchester College, Oxford, 2010
- Mr David Woodfine, Harris Manchester College, Oxford, 2007
- The Reverend Doctor Ralph Waller, Harris Manchester College, Oxford, 2006
- The Reverend Charles Roberts, Queen's Chaplin for Scotland, The Cannongate Kirk, 2005
- Mr Robert Conway, Harris Manchester College, Oxford, 2004

Gow said of his portrait of Grand Duke Guillaume V that it was "probably the most important painting I have ever produced".

=== Private commissions ===
Since 2002, Gow has - apart from public commissions - been commissioned to paint over 100 commissions for private clients across Europe and the United States.

== Exhibitions ==
List of exhibitions:

- 2024 British Art Fair, Saatchi Gallery, London
- 2023 StART Art Fair, Saatchi Gallery, London
- 2022 The Royal Society of Portrait Painters, The Mall Galleries
- 2020 Catherine Prevost Gallery, London
- 2014 Chauchet Contemporary, London
- 2012 The Hollywood Road Arts Club, London
- 2010 The New English Art Club, the Mall Galleries, London
- 2006 The Royal Society of Portrait Painters, The Mall Galleries, London
- 2005 Arndean Gallery, Cork Street, London
- 2004 The Cavalry and Guards Club, Piccadilly, London
- 2002 Paul Mitchel Gallery, Bond Street, London
- 2000 Luschinger Gallery, Greenwich, Connecticut, USA
- 2000 Williams College Museum of Art, Williamstown, Massachusetts, USA
