= Hack Circle =

Coordinates: 43°31′59″S 172°38′16″E

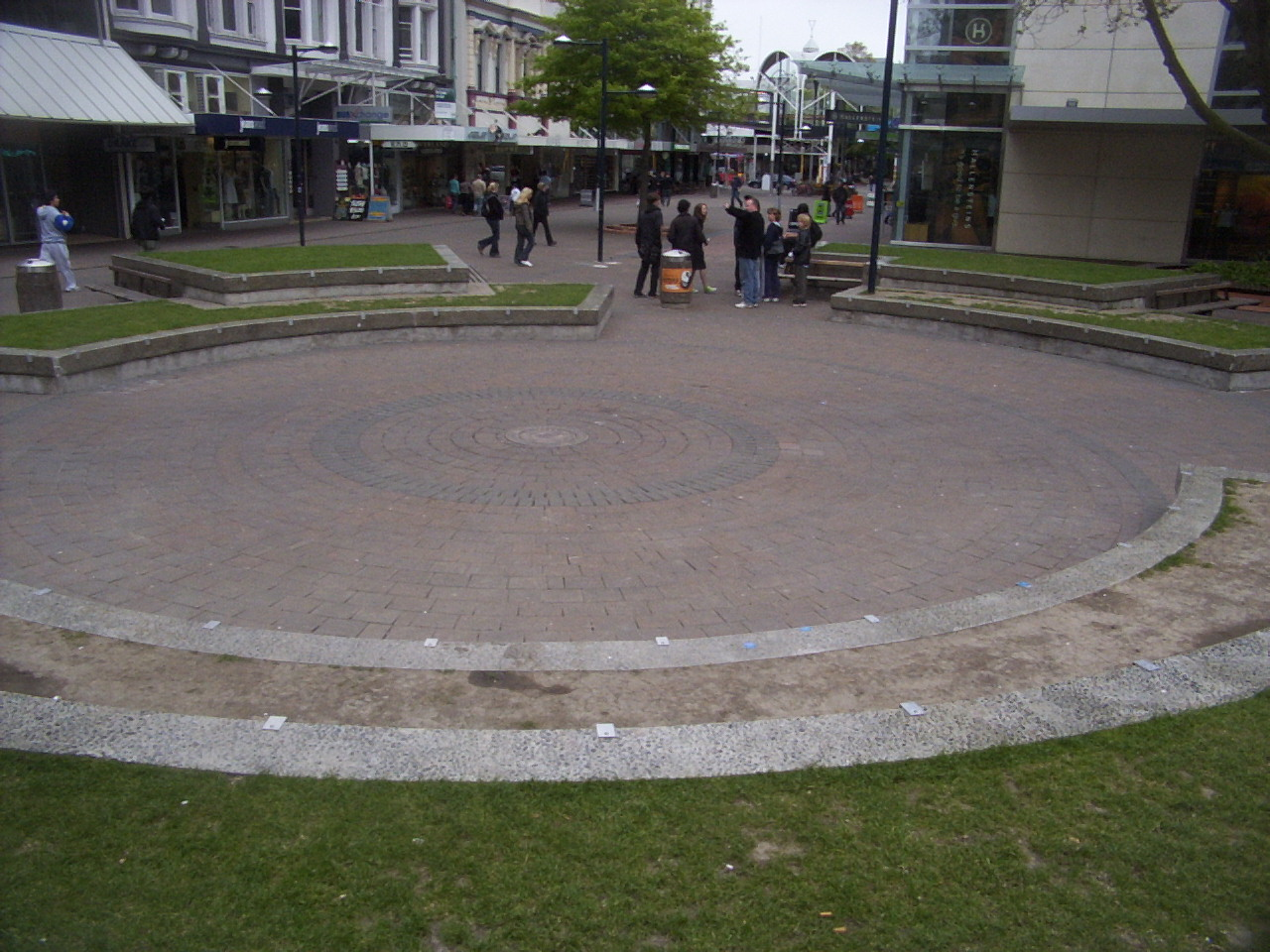
The Hack Circle as it appeared on 23 October 2006

The Hack Circle or Hack was a nickname given to an amphitheatre in central Christchurch, New Zealand. It was built as part of the second phase of developing a pedestrian mall in the central city in 1989 and was officially opened on 6 December of that same year by then mayor Vicki Buck. For a time it was a popular Hacky Sack venue (hence the name), later it became a popular hang out for "black-dressed emos, goths, heavy metal fans and United States style gangstas". A 2004 survey conducted by the Christchurch City Council identified the Hack Circle as a popular place for young people to "hang out, smoke, meet friends etc." The same survey found that 90% of 13- to 15-year-olds and 94% of 16- to 18-year-olds came to the central city in their spare time.

Christchurch police claimed the Hack Circle was a venue for criminal activity; on 20 October 2006, a 19-year-old was arrested for swinging a metal pipe around, and police claim that aggravated robbery, assault and the trafficking of cannabis happened in the area. Sergeant Murry Hurst told The Press that "Ninety per cent of the kids hanging around there are fine, the other 10% cause the problems."

In February 2007 Senior Sergeant Glenn Dobson told The Press that the young people in the Hack Circle were not as intimidating as they could look to others, and commented that "[W]e can't move them on because they look different". Millionaire Christchurch property owner Antony Gough, who is considered one of the most powerful people in the city was an advocate of stronger security for the Cashel Street mall, particularly the Hack Circle, telling The Press that the people who associate there "are just very scary".

== Destruction ==
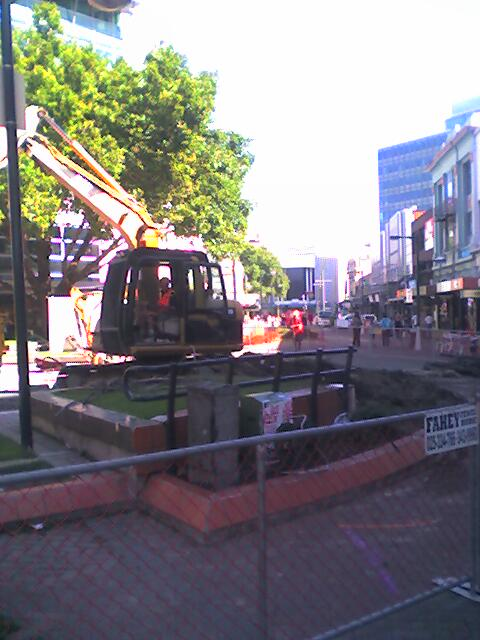
Destruction begins on the Hack Circle on 1 February 2008

In October 2006, the city council announced plans to demolish the amphitheatre and replace the pedestrian mall it is located in with a one way slow road. Daniel Griffiths, a student at nearby Unlimited high school, stated that the council plan was to remove an "undesirable youth element" though the council stated this was not their intention.

On 14 December 2006 the city council voted 7–6 to go ahead with plans to build a road through the pedestrian mall that the Hack Circle is located in, despite "overwhelming opposition". Councillor Bob Shearing said the council's original decision to dump the slow-road happened because it was captivated by a group of people using the City Mall as a "school playground". This comment was criticised by a number of Christchurch citizens, the 19 December issue of The Press carried a number of letters to the editor on the subject, one stated "I am appalled at the sneering remark by Cr Bob Shearing, about young people using the mall as a school playground. What sort of message does it send to the young people who took the time and effort, not only to write a submission but to front up to the council to present it?". Another noted that of the 570 submissions to the council on the plans to build a road, 400 of them were against the proposal, commenting "it is clear the council cares not a jot for public feedback"

On 18 May 2007, Food Not Bombs and students from Unlimited Paenga Tawhiti gathered in the Hack Circle to "reclaim public space" and oppose the plans of the city council and the business group appointed to manage the area (Central City Business Association/City Mall Business Steering Committee) chaired by Anthony Gough, and also including business owner Richard Ballantyne and property developer Dave Henderson, as well as Melbourne based property investor Michael Ogilvie-Lee, who was a significant financial backer of mayor Bob Parker's 2007 election campaign.

Destruction of the Hack Circle began in February 2008. It was replaced not with a slow road however but with a renovated pedestrian mall. The renovations on the area formerly home to the Hack Circle were completed in October 2008.

== Opposition and protest ==
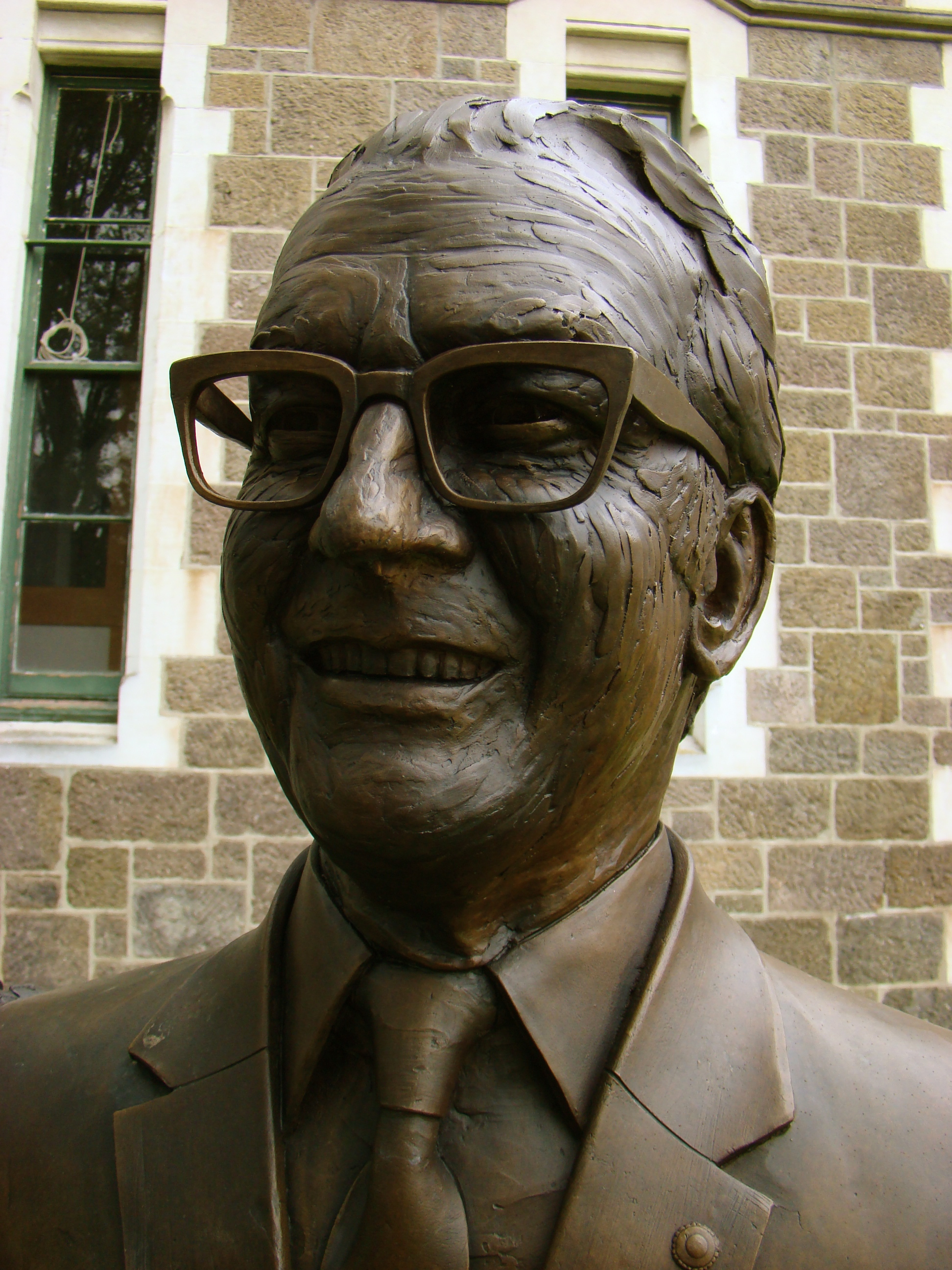
Sir Bob Stewart's bronze bust as part of the Twelve Local Heroes sculpture

The destruction of the Hack Circle was an important issue for young people in Christchurch; in August 2007 Canterbury University student magazine Canta questioned four students on the issue, all had strong opinions on the redevelopment, despite apathetic opinions on other issues such as Student Association elections. Gloria Sharplin, a spokesperson for a protest that occurred at the mall on 7 August told The Press "Young people are being made to feel unwelcome. The hack circle and the fountain are not great places, but it is all you have when you have no money. They can't shut us up and just drive us out of the city."

Another protest occurred on 13 August 2007, as demolition of the Stewart Fountain near the Hack Circle began. A number of young people were arrested for protesting against the demolition in the afternoon. That morning local industrialist Sir Robertson Stewart, the public benefactor who had offered to continue his family's funding of the fountain, had died. Protester Jayde Henry commented "It's terrible that they started today. They must have known."

== New Hack Circle ==
In a 2009 Press article, Central City Business Association manager Paul Lonsdale referred to the former location of the Hack Circle, now a paved area with some seating (but notably no amphitheater) as "The new Hack Circle."

In 2025 a sign was installed dedicating the location as 'Hack Circle'.
