= Hacking =

Hacking may refer to:

== Places ==
- Hacking, an area within Hietzing, Vienna, Austria

== People ==
- David Hacking, 3rd Baron Hacking (born 1938), British barrister and peer
- Douglas Hacking, 1st Baron Hacking (1884–1950), British Conservative politician
- Ian Hacking (1936–2023), Canadian philosopher of science
- Philip Hacking (1931–2024), English Anglican priest, and itinerant evangelical speaker

== Sports ==
- Hacking (falconry), the practice of raising falcons in captivity then later releasing into the wild
- Hacking (rugby), tripping an opposing player
- Pleasure riding, horseback riding for purely recreational purposes, also called hacking
- Shin-kicking, an English martial art also called hacking

== Technology ==
- Hacker, a computer expert with advanced technical knowledge
- Hacker culture, activity within the computer programmer subculture
- Phone hacking, gaining unauthorized access to phones
- ROM hacking, the process of modifying a video game's program image

== Other uses ==
- Cutting through an object using a sharp implement or weapon, particularly with significant force
- Roof and tunnel hacking, unauthorized exploration of roof and utility tunnel spaces

== See also ==
- Hack (disambiguation)
- Hacker (disambiguation)
- Hacks (disambiguation)
- List of hacker groups
