= Edward Hack =

English cricketer

Personal information
- Full name: Edward John Hack
- Born: 1 October 1913; Long Ashton, Somerset, England
- Died: 20 September 1987 (aged 73); Bath, Somerset, England
- Batting: Right-handed

Domestic team information
- Years: Team
- 1937: Somerset

Career statistics
Competition	FC
Matches	1
Runs scored	6
Batting average	6.00
100s/50s	0/0
Top score	6
Catches/stumpings	1/–
- Source: CricketArchive, 22 December 2015

Edward John Hack (1 October 1913 – 20 September 1987), was a cricketer who played one first-class match for Somerset in 1937. He was born in Long Ashton, Somerset, England,

Hack batted at No 8 in the first Somerset innings of the match against Lancashire at Old Trafford, and did not bat in the second innings of a drawn game. Cricket websites agree that he batted right-handed, but do not indicate a bowling style: however, the record of a Somerset Second Eleven match from 1939 in which Hack took wickets suggests that he may have been an all-rounder. In his one first-class match, he did not bowl. A book published in 2017 states that Hack was regarded in his club cricket career for Clevedon Cricket Club primarily as a batsman, and often opened the batting, but he did also bowl and, on occasion, he kept wicket.
