= Alfred Hack =

Australian cricketer

Personal information
- Full name: Alfred Thomas Hack
- Born: 12 June 1905; Glenelg, Adelaide, South Australia
- Died: 4 February 1933 (aged 27); Adelaide, South Australia
- Batting: Right-handed
- Role: Batsman, sometimes wicket-keeper
- Relatives: Frederick Hack (father); Reginald Hack (brother)

Domestic team information
- Years: Team
- 1927-28 to 1931-32: South Australia

Career statistics
Competition	First-class
Matches	22
Runs scored	1081
Batting average	29.21
100s/50s	1/5
Top score	100
Balls bowled	56
Wickets	0
Bowling average	–
5 wickets in innings	0
10 wickets in match	0
Best bowling	–
Catches/stumpings	20/12
- Source: Cricinfo, 6 October 2019

Alfred Thomas Hack (12 June 1905 – 4 February 1933) was a cricketer who played first-class cricket for South Australia from 1927 to 1931.

Hack was most successful in his first two seasons, when he also kept wicket. After Charlie Walker took over as South Australia's wicket-keeper, Hack played as a batsman. He scored his only century in South Australia's victory over Queensland in 1928-29.

His father Frederick and brother Reginald also played cricket for South Australia.

Hack was a schoolteacher. After postings in the Adelaide suburb of Brighton and at the small settlement of Paris Creek, near Strathalbyn, he was appointed to the school at Glenelg, but died suddenly of acute appendicitis shortly after taking up the position. He was 27 years old.
