= Haka (disambiguation) =

Haka is a traditional Māori dance.

Haka can also refer to:

- Dolgans, endonym Haka (Һака)
- Haka of Oahu, 7th Alii Aimoku of Oahu
- Haka of the All Blacks, pre-game challenge of the All Blacks rugby team
- Kapa haka, a contemporary Māori performance style
- Ka Mate, a traditional haka in its Māori cultural context
- Haka dance of the Marquesas
- FC Haka, a football (soccer) team in Finland
- Haka, former name of Hakha, a city in the Chin Hills, Burma
- Haka Mukiga, Ugandan ethno-musician

== See also ==
- Hakha, Myanmar
