= Hacks (disambiguation) =

Hacks is a 2021–26 American comedy-drama television series.

Hacks may also refer to:

== Arts, entertainment, and media ==
- Hacks (1997 film), a 1997 American comedy film
- Hacks (2002 film), a 2002 independent American film
- Hacks (2012 film), a 2012 British telemovie starring Michael Kitchen
- Hacks: The Inside Story, a book by Donna Brazile

== Other uses ==
- Hackney carriages, also called hacks, taxicabs in the city of London
- Hacks at the Massachusetts Institute of Technology, student pranks at the institute
- Peter Hacks (1928–2003), German playwright, author, and essayist

== See also ==
- Hack
- Hacker (disambiguation)
- Hacking
- Hács, a village in Somogy county, Hungary
