= Hackers: Wizards of the Electronic Age =

- Directed by: Fabrice Florin
- Produced by: Fabrice Florin
- Starring: Steven Levy; Steve Wozniak; Richard Stallman; Andy Hertzfeld; Lee Felsenstein; Bill Atkinson; Bill Budge
- Release date: 1985
- Running time: 26 minutes
- Country: United States
- Language: English

Hackers: Wizards of the Electronic Age is a 1985 TV documentary about the hacker community.

The film includes footage of a hacker conference, and interviews with some of the programmers that created the personal computer revolution, including Bill Atkinson, Bill Budge, Doug Carlston, John Draper, Andrew Fluegelman, Lee Felsenstein, Richard Greenblatt, Andy Hertzfeld, David Hughes, Susan Kare, Richard Stallman, Bob Wallace, Robert Woodhead, Steve Wozniak, and others.

All interviews in this documentary were shot over a long weekend at a 1984 hacker conference by the Whole Earth Catalog editors Stewart Brand and Kevin Kelly in Sausalito, California. The event itself (the hacker conference) was inspired by Steven Levy's book Hackers: Heroes of the Computer Revolution.
