= Hakka (disambiguation) =

The Hakka are a Han Chinese people group.

Hakka may also refer to:

- Hakka Chinese, a branch of the Chinese language
- Hakka architecture
- Hakka cuisine
- Harihara I, also known as Hakka, king and ruler of the ancient Vijayanagara Empire
- Hakka (spider), a genus of jumping spiders
