= Wilton Hack =

Australian artist (1843–1923)

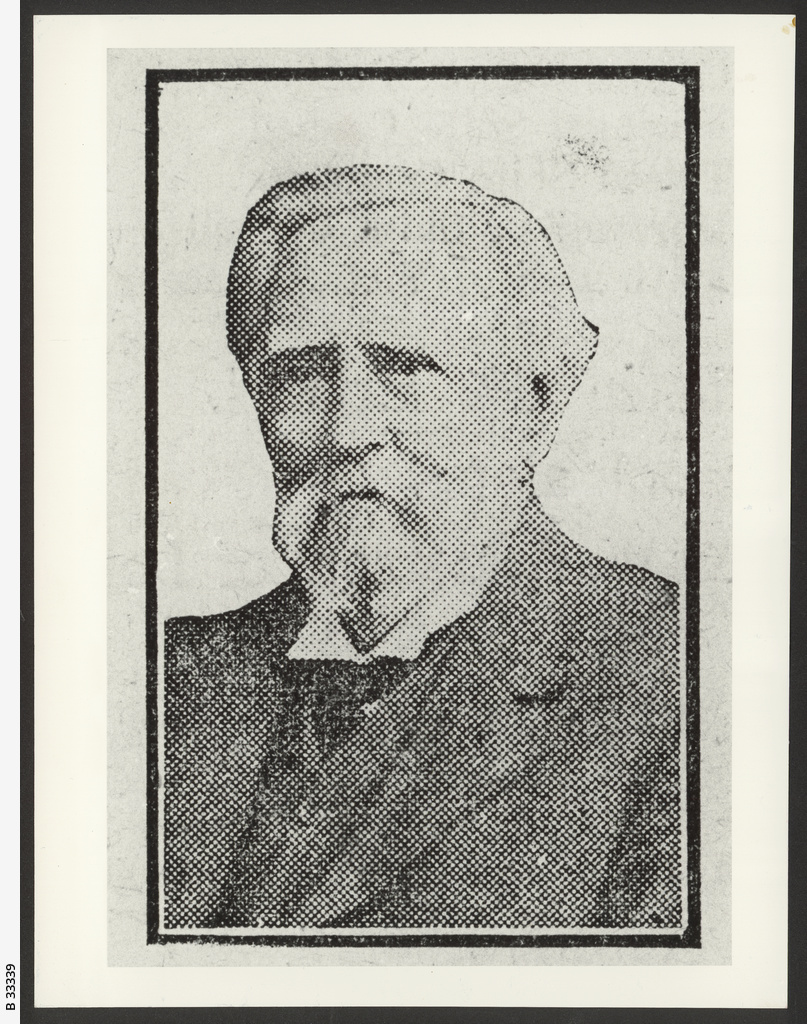
- Born: 1843
- Died: 27 February 1923 (aged 79–80)
- Alma mater: Sandbach School
- Occupation: Orientalist, artist

Wilton Hack (21 May 1843 – 27 February 1923) was an Australian artist, traveller, pastor, lecturer and utopist with interests in Theosophy and Eastern cultures.

== Early life ==
Hack was born in Echunga, South Australia the son of Stephen Hack and Elizabeth Marsh Hack (née Wilton). The colony of South Australia had just gone through a financial crisis during which Stephen and his brother John Barton Hack lost their considerable fortunes. Unlike his brother, whose various business ventures never amounted to much, Stephen was able to attain a modest level of affluence. Wilton studied at J. L. Young's Adelaide Educational Institution in 1855 and 1856, then (perhaps because of the promise he had shown) was sent to his Quaker grandparents in Gloucester, England to further his education at Sandbach Grammar School in Cheshire and the University of Heidelberg, Germany. He returned to Australia in 1865 to assist his father with his sheep station on the Long Desert, and his father's selection, named Pinnaroo, which he took over when his father returned to England in 1865, but was forced off it by the drought of 1865–1867. He found employment as a drawing teacher at his old school Adelaide Educational Institution, at Prince Alfred College, Thomas Caterer's Norwood Grammar School and Frederick Caterer's Glenelg Grammar School.

== Pastor, missionary and teacher ==
He married Anna Maria Stonehouse, daughter of the Rev. G Stonehouse, on 10 May 1870. He joined the Baptist church, and served as pastor at Hilton and "The Stockade" (Yatala Labor Prison). He was ordained minister in 1871.

He left for Nagasaki, Japan as a Baptist missionary on the J. H. Jessen in November 1873 with Alfred J. Clode, John D. Clark and T. L. Boag. They were involved with the Rising Sun and Nagasaki Express newspaper, and founded a Sailors' Club, but the mission made little impact, which they attributed to insufficient financial support. While there, he acted as an envoy of the South Australian Government to sound out the Japanese Government's attitude to Japanese nationals settling in the Northern Territory. (In February 1877 he was sent to Japan to continue this dialogue, but the Satsuma Rebellion was occupying Tokyo's attention and his approaches were rebuffed or ignored.)

He returned to Sydney in June 1876 and embarked on a speaking tour of the south-eastern states, which attracted good crowds. He dropped the title "Reverend" and settled at East Maitland in 1877, founding "Wormley House Grammar School" The school was taken over by a Mr Brown in 1879 but did not reopen. In 1881 the property was taken over by W. Morton Sykes for his East Maitland Grammar School.

== Farming and mining ==
He settled on a farm at nearby Clarence Town, New South Wales, deriving an income from painting, instruction in drawing, and development and sales of a stump extractor "Little Demon" which he patented in 1884.

He helped float the companies that took over "Foley's Claim" and "John Bull Claim" at Bowling Alley Point and the nearby Anderson's Flat mine in 1889, the Golden Chance at Hanging Rock, New South Wales, and prospected for diamonds at Pine Ridge. At the time of the Western Australian gold rush he went to England, and was appointed manager of the East Murchison Gold Mining Syndicate, which took over the Eagle's Nest mine in the Mount Margaret district, but proved a failure. (Confusingly, his son Wilton Hack jnr was also involved in mining ventures.)

== Mount Remarkable ==
In 1893 at a time of high unemployment, he seized on the idea of a communal settlement and procured land at Mount Remarkable, South Australia, his plan being to settle 300 people on 5,000 acres. By March 1894 there were around 130 camped there and a little under 1,000 acres had been secured. Joining fee was £10 for single men, £20 for marrieds. Hack left the settlement around June 1894, citing "ill-health", but by another report, because "he was not suited to a villager's life ... he wanted to be a kind of autocrat". By the end of 1895 after another poor season around half the settlers had left, and those who remained were working hard but surviving on meagre rations. In 1896 the village was closed by the Government and its assets sold though some families stayed on.

== Theosophy and Ceylon ==
Hack became associated with Theosophy and some time before 1894 began adding the initials "F.T.S." to his name. He wrote a hymn "Abide with Me" in 1899, to be found in Theosophical literature, (based on the famous hymn by Henry F Lyte) as well as several books influenced by Theosophical thought. This interest in Eastern philosophy coincided with an involvement in two educational establishments in Ceylon (now Sri Lanka):

On returning from England to Australia around 1892, Hack visited the Buddhist girls' school run by Mrs Marie Musaeus Higgins in Colombo (its first principal was a Victorian, Kate F. Pickett, who died shortly after taking up the position), and was sufficiently impressed to promise funds for a more suitable schoolhouse than the mud hut they were using. This was forthcoming and the Musaeus College's first permanent school building was completed in 1895. He remained a member of the board of trustees until his death.

In 1899 he succeeded Harry Bambury as president of Buddhist boys school Dharmaraja College in Kandy, and did much good work in raising funds, but ill-health interfered and he retired after only a few months, to be succeeded by C. S. Rajaratnam then K. F. Billimoria.

== Back in Australia ==
He returned to Glenelg, South Australia early in 1900 and became active in the local community, as organiser of a Benevolent Society, vice-president of the United Labor Party, and served as a magistrate.

In mid-1915 he moved to Western Australia, where his sons William and Charles were working. He married again and never returned to South Australia.

== Family life ==
- Wilton Hack married Anna Maria Stonehouse ( – 13 August 1911) on 10 May 1870. She was the third daughter of Rev. George Stonehouse (c. 1808 – 24 July 1871)

- Florence Maria Hack (11 November 1871 –) married William Norman Grant Mackenzie ( – ) on 6 April 1904
- William Wilton Meora Stephen Hack (2 December 1872 – 12 February 1941) married Charlotte Scott Murray (1877–) on 25 September 1902
- Charles Corey Hack (27 February 1874 – ) married Ethel G. H. A. Maconochie ( – ) on 29 October 1926
- Wilton Hack (1 September 1878 – 10 April 1933) married Amelia Ellen Cock (1877 – 10 March 1949) on 30 April 1903. Amelia was a daughter of Robert Andrew Cock and Oceana Cock née Schacht ( –1926) who married in 1873.

He married again, to Minnie Alice Vierk of Farrell Flat, South Australia on 26 April 1916. She died, age 80, in 1955.

== Legacy ==
- A pen-and-ink copy of The Combat by Edwin Landseer and a sketchbook from his travels are held by the Mortlock Library of South Australia
- Oriental objets d'art in the "Grey Bedroom" of Parkin House, North Plympton, South Australia, were sent by Wilton to his sister-in-law Ellen Parkin whilst in Japan.

== Bibliography ==
- Thoughts (poetry, as "W. H.") Minerva Press, India 1905
- Samskaras (Sadharana dharma series)
- The Battle of Life (Sadharana dharma series)
- The Human Soul The Oriental Pub. Co., Madras, 1909
- Occult and Psychic Phenomena The Oriental Pub. Co., Madras, 1909
- Comments on the Dharmapada The Oriental Pub. Co., Madras, 1911

== Sources ==
- 'Hack, Wilton (1843–1923)', Australian Dictionary of Biography On-line, National Centre of Biography, Australian National University, accessed 15 September 2011.
