= Stephen Hack =

Stephen Hack (1816 – 14 May 1894) was an early settler of South Australia, and business partner of his brother John Barton Hack.

== History ==
Hack was born in Chichester, England, to Stephen Hack, a banker, and the educational writer Maria Hack (née Barton).

He was educated at Richard Weston's Quaker boarding school at Rochester and when that was shut down, transferred to Fishponds, near Bristol, but he had no inclination for study or the discipline required of Quakers. He worked for a time as traveller for his mother's book publisher, which suited his adventurous spirit.

In September 1836 he accompanied his brother Barton, his wife, and their six children on the Isabella, Captain John Hart, bound for South Australia. They arrived at Holdfast Bay in February 1837. They were expected by their parents and supporters to invest in farmland and businesses in the new colony but great wealth eluded them. They had cattle and sheep at Mount Barker and shares in the whale fisheries, as well as city acres, which were showing a nice profit. They were counting on getting their hands on a special survey of 4,000 acres at Mount Barker but were gazumped by Dutton, McFarlane and Finnis, who had an ally in Osmond Gilles, the Colonial Treasurer.

In 1857 he was contracted by the South Australian Government to explore the Gawler Ranges, which he undertook from May 1857 with Thomas Edward Clark. It followed a good season, so they found many areas of good feed and adequate water, in contrast to reports by J. C. Darke in 1844 and Major P. E. Warburton in 1858, so his reports were given little credence.

In 1857 the brothers established a dairying business at Parnka on The Coorong, converting the milk to hard cheeses, but Stephen Hack was not one to settle down, and dissolved their partnership and returned to the far north, again working for John Baker.

He unloaded several properties which had proved unprofitable, and took up a run at Pinnaroo. In 1865 he returned to England and his wife and daughter Julia. He had lost his fortune in South Australia, and was probably supported by his wife's family in his later years. He passed the Pinnaroo property to his son Wilton Hack, who had just returned from schooling in England and the Continent, but it proved a liability, as 1865–1867 were years of severe drought.

Hack died in 1894 and she died in Gloucester in 1915.

== Family ==
Hack married Elizabeth Marsh "Bessie" Wilton (c. 1816–1915) in England on 3 June 1841. They had two children:

- Julia Africaine Hack (6 March 1842 – September 1913) was a published author of "improving" books for children. She married Rev. Charles Cutler in 1862 and had ten children. Not to be confused with Barton's youngest daughter Julia Emily Hack (1857–1943).

Her publications include Life in the Making, Glen Gordon, and Crew of the 'Jolly Sandboy'.

- Wilton Hack (21 May 1843 – 27 February 1923) married Anna Maria "Annie" Stonehouse (30 June 1840 – 13 Aug 1911) on 10 May 1870. He married again, to Minnie Alice Vierk (c. 21 Mar 1875 in Nuriootpa – c. 4 December 1955) on 26 April 1916.
