= Knightsbridge School =

School in South Australia

Knightsbridge School was a school for girls in Knightsbridge, South Australia (now Leabrook), which ran from 1886 to 1921.

== History ==
Harriet Anne Cook (c. 1855 – November 1943) in 1885 founded a school in a spare room of a house on The Parkway, Knightsbridge owned by Euphemia Clark, whose husband, M(atthew) Symonds Clark, was a brother of John Howard Clark. Harriet was the author of an unpublished personal account Reminiscences of Life on the Government Farm 1874–1884 (1942).

Her sister Edith Agnes Cook (1859 – 2 April 1942), principal of the Advanced School for Girls in Franklin Street, Adelaide, married Samuel Grau "Sam" Hübbe ( – c. 15 October 1900) on 3 January 1885, and late that year resigned from the school, to be replaced by Madeline Rees George (c. 1851–1931). She opened a school in her house in partnership with Harriet, whose students formed the nucleus of Knightsbridge School, as they decided to name it. Boys were accepted in the youngest classes, but older classes were restricted to girls. There was no uniform, and no organised sport. Enrolments soon outgrew the space available and they purchased another house in Statenborough Street, which served until 1921, when they retired.

== Postscript ==
In 1922 the school was taken over by Misses Jones and Wells, "who are employing the Dalton and Montessori methods", but appears not to have survived beyond 1922. The Misses Jones and Wells were, with Calder, Eurhythmics teachers, of which Heather Gell was in South Australia the chief exponent.

In September 1996 the Burnside Historical Society affixed a memorial plaque at the premises, 28 Statenborough Street, Leabrook, in recognition of Mrs Hübbe's Knightsbridge School.

== Students ==
- Dorothea Forster "Dorrit" Black, daughter of Mr. A. Barham Black, and granddaughter of John Howard Clark, won the Tennyson medal for English
- Dorothea "Dora" Crompton (married Ernest Wilfred Harris in 1923) won the Tennyson medal for English
- Dr. Darcy Cowan
- Gladys Rosalind Cowan, married Essington Lewis
- Elsie Miriam Earl Hack (1881–) was a student in 1896. Born Elsie Miriam Earl and adopted by Theo Hack, she was a fine pianist and singer, married John Arthur Ballantyne on 7 August 1907.
