= Reginald Hack =

Australian cricketer

Personal information
- Born: 25 February 1907; Adelaide, Australia
- Died: 31 October 1971 (aged 64); Keith, South Australia
- Source: Cricinfo, 6 August 2020

Reginald Hack (25 February 1907 – 31 October 1971) was an Australian cricketer. He played in one first-class match for South Australia in 1933/34.

== See also ==
- List of South Australian representative cricketers
