= Bill Moore (cricketer) =

Australian cricketer

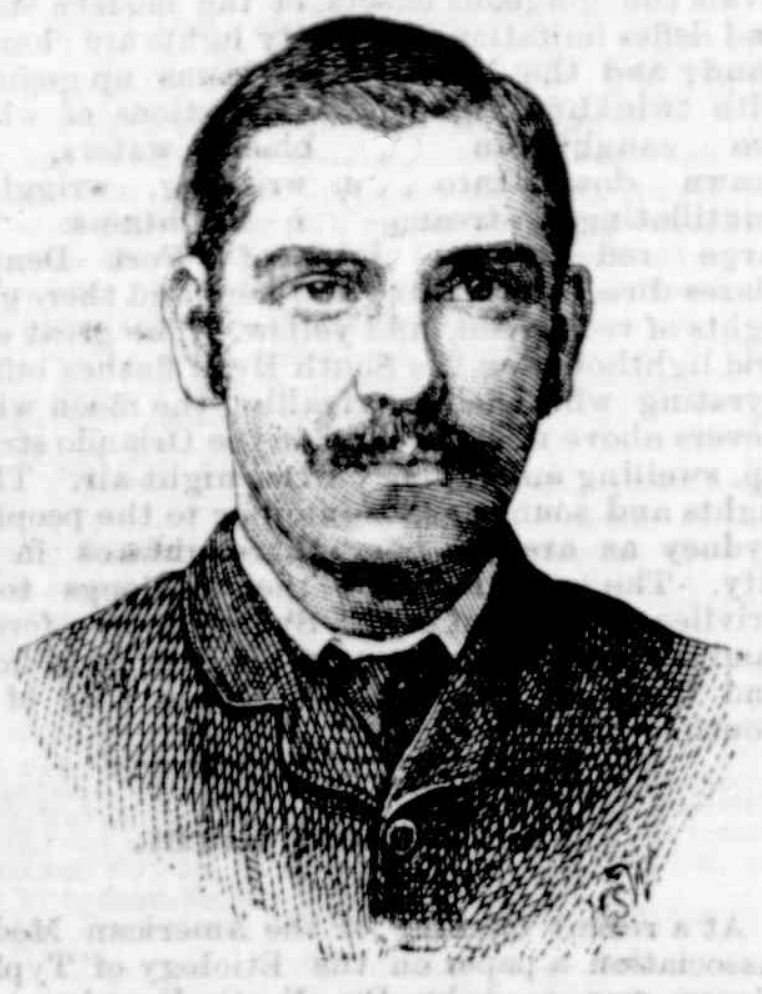

Personal information
- Full name: William Henry Moore
- Born: 16 October 1863; West Maitland, Colony of New South Wales
- Died: 25 February 1956 (aged 92); Lane Cove, New South Wales, Australia
- Batting: Right-handed
- Role: Wicket-keeper
- Relatives: J. Moore (father); G. Moore (uncle); L. D. Moore (brother); C. G. Macartney (nephew); F. S. Cummins (nephew)

Domestic team information
- Years: Team
- 1893–1894: New South Wales
- 1899: Western Australia

Career statistics
Competition	FC
Matches	5
Runs scored	109
Batting average	13.62
100s/50s	0/0
Top score	31*
Catches/stumpings	4/4
- Source: CricketArchive, 14 November 2012

William Henry Moore (16 October 1863 – 25 February 1956) was an Australian cricketer who represented both New South Wales and Western Australia at first-class level.

From Maitland, New South Wales, Moore came from a large cricketing family, with his father, uncle, brother, and two of his nephews all playing first-class cricket for New South Wales. One of his nephews was Charlie Macartney, who later played Test cricket for the Australia national cricket team. Moore played all four matches for New South Wales in the 1893–94 Sheffield Shield, playing as a wicket-keeper. The second of these matches, against South Australia at the Sydney Cricket Ground, was played alongside his brother, Leon Moore, the only time the brothers played together at first-class level.

Batting right-handed, Moore's highest first-class score, 31 not out, was made in the return match against South Australia, at the Adelaide Oval in December 1893. Later in the 1890s, Moore moved to Fremantle, Western Australia, and captained Western Australia in a match against South Australia in April 1899, held at the WACA Ground. Having also played grade cricket for Fremantle teams, he later returned to New South Wales, where he died in Lane Cove, Sydney, on 25 February 1956.

== See also ==
- List of New South Wales representative cricketers
- List of Western Australia first-class cricketers
