= List of centenarians (sportspeople) =

The following is a list of centenarians – specifically, people who became famous as sportspeople — known for reasons other than their longevity. For more lists, see lists of centenarians.

All supercentenarians (above 110 years old)
Living

Name	Lifespan	Age	Reason for notability
Ole Aarnæs	1888–1992	103	Norwegian high jumper
Manohar Aich	1912–2016	104	Indian bodybuilder and former Mr. Universe
Émile Allais	1912–2012	100	French alpine skier
Eddie Ambrose	1894–1994	100	American jockey
Leonidas Andrianopoulos	1911–2011	100	Greek association football player
Constance Applebee	1873–1981	107	American field hockey player
Eileen Ash	1911–2021	110	English cricketer
Carl-Erik Asplund	1923–2024	100	Swedish speed skater, Olympic bronze medalist
Yuri Averbakh	1922–2022	100	Russian chess grandmaster
Graham Bailey	1920–2024	104	English footballer
Errie Ball	1910–2014	103	Welsh-American golfer
Mario Becerril	1917–2018	101	Mexican equestrian
Reg Beresford	1921–2021	100	English footballer
Gretel Bergmann	1914–2017	103	German high jumper
Jeanne Bisgood	1923–2024	100	English golfer
Charlie Booth	1903–2008	104	Australian athlete
Alida van den Bos	1902–2003	101	Dutch gymnast
Charles Braithwaite	1845–1946	100	English cricketer
Philip Henry Bridenbaugh	1890–1990	100	American college football player and coach
Edgar Britt	1913–2017	103	Australian jockey
Bill Brown	1878–1980	101	British Olympic racewalker
Trygve Brudevold	1920–2021	100	Norwegian bobsledder
Betty Brussel	1924–	102	Canadian swimmer
Alan Burgess	1920–2021	100	New Zealand cricketer
Jack Burke Jr.	1923–2024	100	American golfer
Wilhelm Büsing	1921–2023	102	German equestrian
Fred Caligiuri	1918–2018	100	American Major League Baseball player
Carmelo Camet	1904–2007	102	Argentine fencer
Lloyd Campbell	1915–2016	101	Canadian curler
Eddie Carnett	1916–2016	100	American baseball player
Ken Casanega	1921–2021	100	American football quarterback
James Carter	1911–2012	100	American basketball coach
Jaroslav Cháňa	1899–2000	100	Czech footballer
Newton Chandler	1893–1997	103	Australian rules football player
Raghunath Chandorkar	1920–2021	100	Indian cricketer
Edna Child	1922–2023	100	British Olympic diver (1948)
Jimmy Coffey	1909–2010	101	Irish hurler
Abe Coleman	1905–2007	101	Polish-American wrestler
Tony Colobro	1923–2024	100	American football coach and administrator
Rusi Cooper	1922–2023	100	Indian cricketer
Charles Coste	1924–2025	101	French Olympic cyclist Champion (1948), and oldest torch bearer in 2024 Summer Olympics Opening Ceremony
Jim Cullivan	1921–2024	103	American football player and coach
Iris Cummings	1920–2025	104	American Olympic swimmer and aviator
Ray Cunningham	1905–2005	100	American Major League Baseball player
Yvonne Curtet	1920–2025	104	French Olympic athlete
John Daley	1887–1988	101	American Major League Baseball player
Sam Dana	1903–2007	104	American football player
George Daneel	1904–2004	100	South African international rugby union player
Frans De Blaes	1909–2010	100	Belgian canoeist
George Deane	1828–1929	100	English cricketer
Bill Dellastatious	1922–2023	101	American football player and coach
John Dellert	1884–1985	100	American gymnast
Shan Deniston	1919–2020	101	American athlete and sports coach
D. B. Deodhar	1892–1993	101	Indian cricket player and Sanskritist
Dorothy Dermody	1909–2012	102	Irish fencer
Fred I. Dickerson	1911–2017	106	American junior college football coach
Tom Dickinson	1897–1999	102	American football player
John Ditlev-Simonsen	1898–2001	102	Norwegian sailor
Yelena Donskaya	1915–2016	100	Soviet sport shooter
Herb Douglas	1922–2023	101	American athlete
Ernst Dubach	1881–1982	100	Swiss cyclist
Theo Dubois	1911–2011	100	Canadian champion rower
Edward Dyson	1919–2020	100	British rower
George Elder	1921–2022	101	American professional baseball outfielder
Jean Elichagaray	1886–1987	100	French rower
Charlie Emig	1875–1975	100	American Major League Baseball player
Wesley Englehorn	1890–1993	103	American football player and coach
Edward English	1864–1966	102	English cricketer
Ralph Erickson	1902–2002	100	American Major League Baseball player
Horst Faber	1921–2022	101	Austrian figure skater
Ferdinand Fabra	1906–2007	101	German football manager
Magda Fedor	1914–2017	103	Hungarian sports shooter
Ken Feltscheer	1915–2017	102	Australian rules footballer
Alan Finlayson	1900–2001	101	South African cricketer
Frederico Fischer	1917–2022	105	Brazilian athlete
Joaquim Fiúza	1908–2010	102	Portuguese sailor
Josef Fleischlinger	1911–2013	101	Czech basketball coach and sports official
Billie Fleming	1914–2014	100	English long-distance cyclist
Martha Firestone Ford	1925–	100	American football executive
Harry Forsyth	1903–2004	100	British-Irish cricketer
Jim Freeman	1914–2015	101	American college football player and coach
Bruno Frietsch	1896–1996	100	Finnish sport shooter
Johnny Fripp	1921–2022	101	Canadian skier and football player
Evelyn Furtsch	1914–2015	100	American track and field athlete
Gabre Gabric	1914–2015	101	Croatian-born Italian track and field athlete
Miguel Gallastegui	1918–2019	100	Spanish pelota player
Rodrigo García Vizoso	1909–2009	100	Spanish footballer
Milt Gaston	1896–1996	100	American Major League Baseball player
Georges Géronimi	1892–1994	101	French association football forward
Jacques Gerschwiler	1898–2000	101	Swiss figure skater
Fred Gibson	1912–2013	101	Jamaican-born English first-class cricketer
Johnny Gibson	1905–2006	101	American athlete
Ed Gill	1895–1995	100	American Major League Baseball player
Bill Glassford	1914–2016	102	American football player and coach
Fred Gloden	1918–2019	100	American football player
Norman Gordon	1911–2014	103	South African Test cricketer
Alf Goullet	1891–1995	103	Australian cyclist
Achilleas Grammatikopoulos	1908–2008	100	Greek association football player
Bill Greason	1924–	102	American baseball player
Howdy Groskloss	1906–2006	100	American Major League Baseball player
Guo Jie	1912–2015	103	Chinese Olympic athlete
George Haigh	1915–2019	103	English association football player
Virginia Halas McCaskey	1923–2025	102	American football executive
George Harman	1874–1975	101	Irish rugby union international and cricketer
Jaap Havekotte	1912–2014	102	Dutch speed skater
João Havelange	1916–2016	100	Brazilian water polo player and president of FIFA
Basil Hayden	1899–2003	103	American college basketball coach
Don Heap	1912–2016	103	American football and baseball coach
Jack Hearn	1923–2026	103	English judo instructor
Bobbie Heine Miller	1909–2016	106	South African tennis player
John Henderson	1912–2020	107	American college football player
Mac Henderson	1907–2009	101	Scottish international rugby union player
Ernst Jakob Henne	1904–2005	101	German racecar driver
Erik Herseth	1892–1993	100	Norwegian sailor
Red Hoff	1891–1998	107	American Major League Baseball player
Mary Holda	1915–2016	100	All-American Girls Professional Baseball League player
Ralph Horween	1896–1997	100	American football player
Edith Houghton	1912–2013	100	American professional baseball player and scout
Jim Hutchinson	1896–2000	103	Longest-lived English male cricketer
Ulrich Inderbinen	1900–2004	103	Swiss mountain guide
Gordon Ingate	1926–2026	100	Australian sailor
Joaquim Duarte Gonçalves Isabelinha	1908–2009	100	Portuguese association football player and medical doctor
Fernand Jaccard	1907–2008	100	Swiss association football midfielder
Alberto Jammaron	1915–2016	101	Italian cross-country skier
Dirk Janssen	1881–1986	105	Dutch gymnast
Arch Jelley	1922–2026	104	New Zealand Olympic athletics coach
Kai Jensen	1897–1997	100	Danish athlete
Betsy Jochum	1921–2025	104	American baseball player
Signe Johansson-Engdahl	1905–2010	104	Swedish swimmer
Aarne Kainlauri	1915–2020	104	Finnish track and field athlete
Andrejs Kapmals	1889–1994	104	Latvian marathoner
Ágnes Keleti	1921–2025	103	Hungarian-Israeli Olympic gold medal-winning gymnast
Rezső Kende	1908–2011	102	Hungarian gymnast
Feroze Khan	1904–2005	100	Pakistani field hockey player
Earl Killian	1920–2022	102	American college baseball, basketball, and soccer coach
Phyllis Mudford King	1905–2006	100	British Wimbledon champion
Ioan Kiss	1901–2006	105	Romanian international footballer
Jalmari Kivenheimo	1889–1994	105	Finnish gymnast
Hans Kleppen	1907–2009	102	Norwegian ski jumper
Sir Durward Knowles	1917–2018	100	Bahamanian sailor
Johnny Kovatch	1912–2013	101	American football player
Ninel Krutova	1926–	100	Russian Olympic diver
John Kundla	1916–2017	101	American basketball coach
Gustav Lantschner	1910–2011	100	Austrian alpine skier and actor
Henning Larsen	1910–2011	100	Danish athlete
Sam Latter	1904–2010	106	Scottish footballer
Jack Laver	1917–2017	100	Australian cricketer
Roger Lebranchu	1922–2025	102	French rower
Lee Tsuntung	1916–2017	100	Chinese basketball player
Maxime Lehmann	1906–2009	102	French association football defensive midfielder
Julio César León	1925–2025	100	Venezuelan cyclist and first Olympian from Venezuela (Note: In the 1932 Summer Olympics, Alberto Egea competed in art competitions, but these are no longer recognized as events by the IOC.)
Marv Levy	1925–	101	American football coach
Bud Lewis	1908–2011	103	American golfer
Elizabeth Lindsay	1912–2013	100	American track and field athlete
René Llense	1913–2014	100	French footballer
Gunnar Löfgren	1910–2012	101	Swedish footballer
Megan Lowe	1915–2017	101	English cricketer
Bill Lucas	1917–2018	101	British RAF officer and Olympic long-distance runner (1948)
Mike Lude	1922–2024	101	American college sports coach and athletics director
John Lysak	1914–2020	105	American canoeist
Johnny Macknowski	1923–2024	101	American basketball player
Hans Maier	1916–2018	102	Dutch water polo player
Tony Malinosky	1909–2011	101	American Major League Baseball player
Diran Manoukian	1919–2020	101	French field hockey player
Carla Marangoni	1915–2018	102	Italian gymnast
Zach March	1892–1994	101	English footballer
Robert Marchand	1911–2021	109	French cyclist
Joe Marhefka	1902–2003	101	American football player
Connie Marrero	1911–2014	102	Cuban Major League Baseball player
Ted Martin	1902–2004	101	Australian cricketer
Kenneth McAlpine	1920–2023	102	British racing driver
Neil McCorkell	1912–2013	100	English county cricketer
Jim Miller	1919–2026	107	Australian rules footballer
Ralph Miller	1873–1973	100	American Major League Baseball player
Keizo Miura	1904–2006	101	Japanese skier and ski instructor
Hidekichi Miyazaki	1910–2019	108	Japanese masters athlete
Gardnar Mulloy	1913–2016	102	American tennis player
Jackson Nascimento	1924–2026	102	Brazilian footballer
Millito Navarro	1905–2011	105	Puerto Rican baseball player
John A. Nerud	1913–2015	102	American horse trainer
Helen Nicol	1920–2021	101	Canadian baseball player
Andreas Nilsson	1910–2011	101	Swedish association football midfielder
Wilf Nixon	1882–1985	102	English association football goalkeeper
Bernarr Notley	1918–2019	100	English cricketer
Albert Öberg	1888–1990	101	Swedish athlete
Marjorie Okell	1908–2009	101	British athlete
Luis Oliva	1908–2009	101	Argentine athlete
Hanna Olsen	1889–1990	100	Swedish fencer
Kevin O'Neill	1925–	101	Australian association footballer
Bill Otis	1889–1990	100	American Major League Baseball player
Ace Parker	1912–2013	101	American professional American football and Major League Baseball player
Alf Patrick	1921–2021	100	English footballer
Ivo Pavelić	1908–2011	103	Yugoslavian footballer and swimmer
Attilio Pavesi	1910–2011	100	Italian cyclist
Ettore Perego	1913–2013	100	Italian gymnast
Cyril Perkins	1911–2013	102	English county cricketer
Gordon Perry	1903–2003	100	Canadian football player
Jacqueline Piatigorsky	1911–2012	100	French-born American chess and tennis player, author and sculptor
Paul Pietsch	1911–2012	100	German pre-War Grand Prix and Formula One racing driver and magazine publisher
Brian Pope	1911–2011	100	English international rugby union player
Jim Power	1895–1998	102	Irish hurler
Hal Haig Prieste	1896–2001	104	Armenian-American high diver and bronze medalist at the 1920 Summer Olympics
Frank Prihoda	1921–2022	101	Australian Olympic alpine skier
Tom Pritchard	1917–2017	100	New Zealand cricketer
Alfred Proksch	1908–2011	102	Austrian athlete and graphic designer
Marie Provazníková	1890–1991	100	Czechoslovak sports official active in the Sokol movement
Anthony Purssell	1926–	100	English Olympic rower (1948)
Maurice Racca	1922–2023	100	French Olympic sport shooter (1956)
Marko Račič	1920–2022	102	Slovenian Olympic athlete (1948)
Ted Radcliffe	1902–2005	103	American Negro league baseball player
Vasant Raiji	1920–2020	100	Indian cricketer and cricket historian
Hermano da Silva Ramos	1925–2026	100	Brazilian Formula One Grand Prix driver
Godfrey Rampling	1909–2009	100	English relay runner
Juan Reccius	1911–2012	101	Chilean athlete
Archie Richardson	1879–1981	101	Australian rules footballer
Carl Richardson	1921–2023	102	American college football coach (Eastern New Mexico University)
Pietro Righetti	1899–2001	102	Italian cyclist
Albert Ritzenberg	1918–2018	100	American tennis player and coach
Eddie Robinson	1920–2021	100	American baseball player
James Stillman Rockefeller	1902–2004	102	American rower and founder of the First National City Bank of New York
Nic Roeser	1896–1997	100	Luxembourgian gymnast
Jos Romersa	1915–2016	101	Luxembourgian gymnast
Roy Roper	1923–2023	100	New Zealand rugby player
Bernardo Ruiz	1925–2025	100	Spanish cyclist
Bob Ryland	1920–2020	100	American tennis player and coach
Don Salls	1919–2021	101	American football player and coach
Mike Sandlock	1915–2016	100	American baseball player
Zoltan Sarosy	1906–2017	110	Hungarian-Canadian chess master
Vladimir Savin	1926–2026	100	Soviet football goalkeeper
Alan Sayers	1915–2017	101	New Zealand track and field athlete
Simone Schaller	1912–2016	104	American track and field athlete
Ambrose Schindler	1917–2018	101	American football player
Johan Chr. Schønheyder	1915–2015	100	Norwegian sports official
Mien Schopman-Klaver	1911–2018	107	Dutch track and field athlete
Rudolf Schrader	1875–1981	105	American gymnast
Aron Schvartzman	1908–2013	104	Argentine chess master
Archie Scott	1918–2019	101	Scottish cricketer
Celina Seghi	1920–2022	102	Italian alpine skier
Vic Seixas	1923–2024	100	American tennis player
Bobby Shantz	1925–	101	American Major League Baseball player
Félix Sienra	1916–2023	107	Uruguayan Olympic sailor
Silas Simmons	1895–2006	111	Longest-lived American semi-professional and professional baseball player
Ingeborg Sjöqvist	1912–2015	103	Swedish diver
Rupert de Smidt	1883–1986	102	South African cricketer
Arthur Smith	1915–2021	106	English association footballer
Lyle Smith	1916–2017	101	American football coach
Herman Smith-Johannsen	1875–1987	111	Norwegian-Canadian cross-country skier
Erna Sondheim	1904–2008	103	German fencer
Cecil Souders	1921–2021	100	American football player
Amos Alonzo Stagg	1862–1965	102	American football player and coach
Harold Stapleton	1915–2015	100	Australian cricketer
Sreten Stefanović	1916–2020	103	Yugoslav gymnast
Rollie Stiles	1906–2007	100	American Major League Baseball player
Gordon Stone	1914–2015	100	Australian rugby union player
Leon Štukelj	1898–1999	100	Slovenian gymnast
Egon Sundberg	1911–2015	104	Swedish footballer
Al Suomi	1913–2014	100	American National Hockey League player
Karl Swanson	1900–2002	101	American Major League Baseball player
Sándor Tarics	1913–2016	102	Hungarian water polo player
Ned Thompson	1910–2011	101	American collegiate sports coach and administrator
Olga Törös	1914–2015	100	Hungarian gymnast
Ignacio Trelles	1916–2020	103	Mexican football coach
Charley Trippi	1921–2022	100	American football player
Talat Tunçalp	1915–2017	101	Turkish cyclist
Eric Tweedale	1921–2023	102	English-born Australian rugby union player
Harry Van Surdam	1881–1982	100	American football player, coach and official
Francisco Varallo	1910–2010	100	Argentine association football player, last surviving participant of the 1930 FIFA World Cup
Jacqueline Vaudecrane	1913–2018	104	French figure skater and coach
Otto von Müller	1875–1976	100	German Olympic tennis player
Whitey Von Nieda	1922–2023	101	American basketball player
Harry Walker	1915–2018	103	English rugby union player
Sir Sydney Walling	1907–2009	102	Antiguan cricketer
Walter Walsh	1907–2014	106	American FBI agent and sport shooter
Sydney Ward	1907–2010	103	New Zealand cricketer
Billy Werber	1908–2009	100	American Major League Baseball player
Gene Wettstone	1913–2013	100	American gymnastics coach
John Wheatley	1860–1962	102	New Zealand cricketer
Martin White	1909–2011	102	Irish hurler
Edvin Wide	1896–1996	100	Swedish long-distance runner
Bucky Williams	1906–2009	102	American baseball player
Mac Wilson	1914–2017	103	Australian rules footballer
Willem Winkelman	1887–1990	102	Dutch athlete
Steve Wochy	1922–	103	Canadian National Hockey League player
Bob Wright	1891–1993	101	American Major League Baseball player
Wu Chengzhang	1924–	102	Chinese Olympic basketball player
Phyllis Wylie	1911–2012	101	English amateur golfer
Donnell Young	1888–1989	101	American Olympic sprinter
Henry Young	1923–	103	Australian tennis player
Fred Zebouni	1914–2014	100	Lebanese Olympic sailor
