= Jemmy Moore =

English-born Australian cricketer

Personal information
- Full name: James Moore
- Born: 1839; Ampthill, Bedfordshire, England
- Died: 19 April 1890 (aged 50–51); West Maitland, Colony of New South Wales
- Batting: Right-handed
- Role: Batsman
- Relatives: G. Moore (brother); L. D. Moore (son); W. H. Moore (son); C. G. Macartney (grandnephew); F. S. Cummins (grandson)

Domestic team information
- Years: Team
- 1861: New South Wales

Career statistics
Competition	FC
Matches	1
Runs scored	30
Batting average	15.00
100s/50s	0/0
Top score	21
Balls bowled	69
Wickets	2
Bowling average	12.00
5 wickets in innings	0
10 wickets in match	0
Best bowling	2/20
Catches/stumpings	0/–
- Source: CricketArchive, 14 November 2012

James "Jemmy" Moore (1839 – 19 April 1890) was an Australian cricketer who played a single first-class match for New South Wales during the 1861–62 season.

Born in Ampthill, Bedfordshire, Moore was the much younger brother of George Moore, who had emigrated to Australia in 1852. Jemmy Moore joined his brother in New South Wales later in the decade, assisting with his baking and confectionery business in Maitland. The Moore brothers were both keen cricketers, and, according to one source, were at one point "undoubtedly the best bowlers in New South Wales". A New South Wales team visited Melbourne in January 1862, and Jemmy Moore was included in the side to play Victoria. In what was retrospectively recognised as his only first-class match, he finished with 2/20 in Victoria's first innings, taking the wickets of J. B. Thompson and Charles Makinson. In New South Wales' second innings (after following on), he was the second highest scorer, with 21 runs. Victoria won the match by 10 wickets.

An English side led by H. H. Stephenson toured later in the 1861–62 season, the first overseas tour of Australia. Moore played a number of matches against the side – one for a New South Wales XXII, and two for a combined New South Wales and Victoria XXII. He opened the bowling in the first two matches, bowling over 30 four-ball overs in each of the English side's first innings, but was later overshadowed by his brother George, who took seventeen wickets in the final two matches in Sydney. Jemmy Moore once again played for New South Wales when another English side led by George Parr toured during the 1863–64 season, and also featured in a match against a Queensland XXII, finishing with 9/14 in Queensland's second innings. Moore subsequently went to Brisbane to play and coach professionally, but he returned to Maitland after a few years, looking after the local cricket pitch. He died in Maitland in 1890 after a brief illness. A number of Moore's relations went on to play at high levels – two sons, Leon and Bill, a grandson, Frank Cummins, and a grandnephew, Charlie Macartney, all played for New South Wales.

== See also ==
- List of New South Wales representative cricketers
