= Leonard Moore =

Leonard Moore may refer to:

- Leonard Moore (American football), American football player
- Leonard P. Moore (1898–1982), federal appellate judge in the United States
- Leonard Moore (literary agent) (died 1959), literary agent
- Leonard W. Moore, founder and president of Moore Industries
- Lenny Moore, American football player
- Leon Moore (1871–1934), born Leonard David Moore, Australian cricketer
