= George Moore (cricketer) =

Australian cricketer

Personal information
- Full name: George Moore
- Born: 18 April 1820; Ampthill, Bedfordshire, England
- Died: 29 September 1916 (aged 96); West Maitland, New South Wales, Australia
- Batting: Right-handed
- Bowling: Right-arm medium (round-arm)
- Role: Bowler
- Relatives: J Moore (brother); WH Moore (nephew); LD Moore (nephew); CG Macartney (grandson); FS Cummins (grandson)

Domestic team information
- Years: Team
- 1871–1873: New South Wales

Career statistics
| Competition | FC |
|---|---|
| Matches | 3 |
| Runs scored | 22 |
| Batting average | 7.33 |
| 100s/50s | 0/0 |
| Top score | 8* |
| Balls bowled | 507 |
| Wickets | 15 |
| Bowling average | 12.20 |
| 5 wickets in innings | 1 |
| 10 wickets in match | 0 |
| Best bowling | 6/56 |
| Catches/stumpings | 5/- |
- Source: CricketArchive, 28 June 2016

George Moore (18 April 1820 – 29 September 1916) was an Australian cricketer who played three first-class matches for New South Wales during the early 1870s. Born in Bedfordshire, England, he emigrated to Maitland, New South Wales, aged 32, and first played cricket for the colony during the 1861–62 English tour of Australia led by H. H. Stephenson. A round-arm bowler, Moore's first match at first-class level came when he was almost 51 years old, and he played two more matches over the following two seasons, finishing with 15 first-class wickets. He continued his involvement in cricket well into old age, and died at his home in Maitland aged 96. Many members of Moore's family also played cricket at high levels, most notably his grandson Charlie Macartney, who went on to play Test cricket for Australia.

== Career ==
Moore was born in Ampthill, Bedfordshire in 1820, but emigrated to Maitland, New South Wales, in 1852, where he opened a bakery and confectionery shop. During the 1861–62 tour of Australia by an English team led by H. H. Stephenson, he played in two matches—one for New South Wales, and one for a combined New South Wales and Victoria team, with the Australian teams fielding 22 players to the English team's 11. In the second of these matches, he took a ten-wicket haul opening the bowling alongside George Gilbert in each innings, with his 6/39 instrumental in dismissing the English team for 60 runs in their second innings.

Despite his age, Moore again played for the state when George Parr's team toured Australia during the 1863–64 season, opening the bowling with Nat Thomson. With New South Wales fielding 18 players, the match was not accorded first-class status, although Moore took four wickets in the English team's first innings. Moore did not make his first-class debut until March 1870, when at the age of 50 years and 325 days he played against Victoria in an intercolonial match at the Albert Ground, Sydney. Coming in last in the batting order, he scored eight not out in a 33-run partnership with Charles Bannerman (also on debut), which enabled New South Wales to reach 200 runs for the first time in intercolonial matches. This achievement so excited their teammates that they were carried off the ground on their shoulders. Moore went on to play two further first-class matches, both against Victoria, with his best bowling figures, 6/56, coming during the 1871–72 season, in a match New South Wales lost by an innings and 26 runs. In recognition of his performance at the match, he was presented with the match ball mounted on a silver stand.

Moore played a further match for a New South Wales XVIII during the 1873–74 English tour of Australia led by W. G. Grace, but had little involvement, taking only one wicket. He also played for the Northern Districts of New South Wales XXII against the Australian national side in November 1877, a match notable for Fred Spofforth's 26 wickets. Having retired from his successful confectionery manufacturing business in the 1885, Moore continued to be involved in cricket up until his death, reputedly playing his last match in 1895, at the age of 74. Moore died at his home in Maitland in September 1916, aged 96 years and 171 days. On his death, he was the oldest surviving New South Wales cricketer, and remained the state's longest-lived cricketer until Harold Stapleton passed his record in June 2011. Moore was survived by four children, one of whom, Augustus Frederick Moore, served as mayor of Newcastle in 1893. Two of his grandchildren, Frank Cummins and Charlie Macartney, played first-class cricket, with the latter going on to play 35 Tests for Australia. Macartney had been taught to play cricket by Moore with a small hand-crafted cedar bat and apples from the family orchard. Moore's younger brother, Jemmy Moore, joined his brother in Australia, with he and his children, Leon and Bill Moore, all playing cricket for New South Wales.

== See also ==
- List of New South Wales representative cricketers
