= Archibald Richardson =

Archibald Richardson may refer to:

- Archibald Read Richardson (1881–1954), British mathematician
- Archibald Richardson (surgeon), State Surgeon of Ireland in 1774
- Archibald Richardson (Royal Navy officer) (1917–1944), Fleet Air Arm fighter pilot during the Second World War

== See also ==
- Archie Richardson (1879–1981), Australian rules footballer
