= List of centenarians (National Football League players) =

This is a list of National Football League players who lived to the age of 100. For other sportspeople who lived to be 100, see List of centenarians (sportspeople). For other lists of centenarians, see Lists of centenarians.

== List ==
Name	Born	Died	Age	Team(s)
Ralph Horween	August 3, 1896; Chicago, Illinois	May 26, 1997; Charlottesville, Virginia	100 years, 296 days	Chicago Cardinals (1921–1923)
Tom Dickinson	July 20, 1897; Detroit, Michigan	October 29, 1999; Georgetown, Ohio	102 years, 101 days	Detroit Heralds (1920)
Sam Dana	August 7, 1903; New York City, New York	October 29, 2007; Kenmore, New York	104 years, 83 days	Hartford Blues (1926); New York Yankees (1928)
Jim Woodruff	July 11, 1903; Nebraska	November 21, 2007; Tucson, Arizona	104 years, 133 days	Chicago Cardinals (1926); Buffalo Bisons (1929)
Johnny Kovatch	June 6, 1912; South Bend, Indiana	October 11, 2013; Santa Barbara, California	101 years, 127 days	Cleveland Rams (1938)
Ace Parker	May 17, 1912; Portsmouth, Virginia	November 6, 2013; Portsmouth, Virginia	101 years, 173 days	Brooklyn Dodgers (1937–1941); Boston Yanks (1945); New York Yankees (1946)
Fred Gloden	December 21, 1918; Dubuque, Iowa	February 25, 2019; Philadelphia, Pennsylvania	100 years, 66 days	Philadelphia Eagles (1941); Miami Seahawks (1946)
Cecil Souders	January 3, 1921; Bucyrus, Ohio	August 30, 2021; Hilliard, Ohio	100 years, 239 days	Detroit Lions (1947–1949)
Ken Casanega	February 18, 1921; Alameda County, California	October 10, 2021; Medford, Oregon	100 years, 234 days	San Francisco 49ers (1946, 1948)
Charley Trippi	December 14, 1921; Pittston, Pennsylvania	October 19, 2022; Athens, Georgia	100 years, 309 days	Chicago Cardinals (1947–1955)
