= 1894 Salford Borough Council election =

Local election in Salford

- 1 November 1894

16 of 64 seats on Salford County Borough Council 33 seats needed for a majority
| | First party | Second party | Third party |
|---|---|---|---|
| Party | Conservative | Liberal | Independent Labour |
| Last election | 10 seats, 52.9% | 5 seats, 37.8% | 1 seat, 0.0% |
| Seats before | 32 | 30 | 1 |
| Seats won | 9 | 7 | 0 |
| Seats after | 35 | 27 | 1 |
| Seat change | ▲3 | ▼3 | Steady |
| Popular vote | 6,908 | 7,044 | 714 |
| Percentage | 41.6% | 42.5% | 4.3% |
| Swing | ▼11.3% | ▲4.7% | ▲4.3% |
| | Fourth party |
| Party | Independent |
| Last election | 0 seats, 0.0% |
| Seats before | 1 |
| Seats won | 0 |
| Seats after | 1 |
| Seat change | Steady |
| Popular vote | 467 |
| Percentage | 2.8% |
| Swing | ▲2.8% |
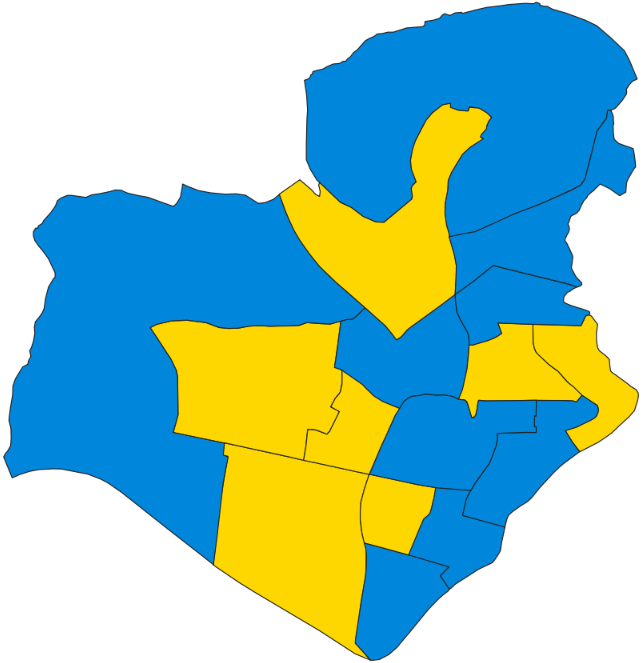
- Map of results of 1894 election
Leader of the Council before election
No overall control
Leader of the Council after election
Conservative

Elections to Salford Borough Council were held on Thursday, 1 November 1894. One third of the councillors seats were up for election, with each successful candidate to serve a three-year term of office. The Conservative Party gained overall control of the council from no overall control.

== Election result ==
| Party | Votes | | Seats | | | Full Council | |
| Conservative Party | 6,908 (41.6%) | ▼11.3 | 9 (56.3%) | 9 / 16 | ▲3 | 35 (54.7%) | 35 / 64 |
| Liberal Party | 7,044 (42.5%) | ▲4.7 | 7 (43.8%) | 7 / 16 | ▼3 | 27 (42.2%) | 27 / 64 |
| Independent Labour | 714 (4.3%) | ▲4.3 | 0 (0.0%) | 0 / 16 | Steady | 1 (1.6%) | 1 / 64 |
| Independent | 467 (2.8%) | ▲2.8 | 0 (0.0%) | 0 / 16 | Steady | 1 (1.6%) | 1 / 64 |
| Ind. Labour Party | 1,459 (8.8%) | ▼0.5 | 0 (0.0%) | 0 / 16 | Steady | 0 (0.0%) | 0 / 64 |

=== Full council ===
↓
| 1 | 27 | 1 | 35 |

=== Aldermen ===
↓
| 6 | 10 |

=== Councillors ===
↓
| 1 | 21 | 1 | 25 |

== Ward results ==
=== Albert Park ===
Albert Park
| Party | Candidate | Votes | % | ±% |
|---|---|---|---|---|
| Conservative | A. M. Kinghorn* | 736 | 62.0 | +11.8 |
| Liberal | A. Hailwood | 452 | 38.0 | +8.9 |
| Majority | | 284 | 24.0 | +2.9 |
| Turnout | | 1,188 | | |
| Conservative gain from Liberal | | Swing | | |

=== Charlestown ===
Charlestown
| Party | Candidate | Votes | % | ±% |
|---|---|---|---|---|
| Liberal | W. Hughes* | 1,352 | 93.5 | N/A |
| Ind. Labour Party | G. Witter | 94 | 6.5 | −35.4 |
| Majority | | 1,258 | 87.0 | |
| Turnout | | 1,446 | | |
| Liberal hold | | Swing | | |

=== Crescent ===
Crescent
| Party | Candidate | Votes | % | ±% |
|---|---|---|---|---|
| Conservative | E. Simpson | 927 | 56.7 | N/A |
| Liberal | E. Scholes* | 708 | 43.3 | N/A |
| Majority | | 219 | 13.4 | N/A |
| Turnout | | 1,635 | | |
| Conservative gain from Liberal | | Swing | | |

=== Grosvenor ===
Grosvenor
| Party | Candidate | Votes | % | ±% |
|---|---|---|---|---|
| Conservative | C. A. Farmer* | 707 | 56.6 | +7.6 |
| Ind. Labour Party | J. Heaviside | 543 | 43.4 | +23.0 |
| Majority | | 164 | 13.2 | −5.2 |
| Turnout | | 1,250 | | |
| Conservative hold | | Swing | | |

=== Hope ===
Hope
| Party | Candidate | Votes | % | ±% |
|---|---|---|---|---|
| Conservative | R. Hudson* | 630 | 81.6 | +27.4 |
| Ind. Labour Party | E. Parker | 142 | 18.4 | N/A |
| Majority | | 488 | 63.2 | +54.8 |
| Turnout | | 772 | | |
| Conservative hold | | Swing | | |

=== Islington ===
Islington
| Party | Candidate | Votes | % | ±% |
|---|---|---|---|---|
| Conservative | T. Robinson* | uncontested | | |
| Conservative hold | | Swing | | |

=== Kersal ===
Kersal
| Party | Candidate | Votes | % | ±% |
|---|---|---|---|---|
| Conservative | W. Ollier* | 688 | 61.9 | N/A |
| Liberal | J. Jackson | 423 | 38.1 | N/A |
| Majority | | 265 | 23.8 | N/A |
| Turnout | | 1,111 | | |
| Conservative hold | | Swing | | |

=== Ordsall ===
Ordsall
| Party | Candidate | Votes | % | ±% |
|---|---|---|---|---|
| Conservative | S. Rudman* | 798 | 52.8 | N/A |
| Independent Labour | R. W. Watters | 714 | 47.2 | N/A |
| Majority | | 84 | 5.6 | N/A |
| Turnout | | 1,512 | | |
| Conservative hold | | Swing | | |

=== Regent ===
Regent
| Party | Candidate | Votes | % | ±% |
|---|---|---|---|---|
| Liberal | W. Huddart* | 836 | 59.8 | N/A |
| Conservative | C. T. I. Gradisky | 562 | 40.2 | N/A |
| Majority | | 274 | 19.6 | N/A |
| Turnout | | 1,398 | | |
| Liberal hold | | Swing | | |

=== St. Matthias' ===
St. Matthias'
| Party | Candidate | Votes | % | ±% |
|---|---|---|---|---|
| Liberal | H. B. Harrison* | uncontested | | |
| Liberal hold | | Swing | | |

=== St. Paul's ===
St. Paul's
| Party | Candidate | Votes | % | ±% |
|---|---|---|---|---|
| Liberal | G. Boys* | 575 | 68.8 | +8.1 |
| Ind. Labour Party | T. Goddard | 261 | 31.2 | N/A |
| Majority | | 314 | 37.6 | +16.2 |
| Turnout | | 836 | | |
| Liberal hold | | Swing | | |

=== St. Thomas' ===
St. Thomas'
| Party | Candidate | Votes | % | ±% |
|---|---|---|---|---|
| Conservative | T. Kay | 513 | 52.3 | N/A |
| Independent | R. H. Quine | 467 | 47.7 | N/A |
| Majority | | 46 | 4.6 | |
| Turnout | | 980 | | |
| Conservative hold | | Swing | | |

=== Seedley ===
Seedley
| Party | Candidate | Votes | % | ±% |
|---|---|---|---|---|
| Liberal | W. Stephens* | 801 | 79.7 | +16.4 |
| Ind. Labour Party | J. Price | 204 | 20.3 | N/A |
| Majority | | 597 | 59.4 | +32.8 |
| Turnout | | 1,005 | | |
| Liberal hold | | Swing | | |

=== Trafford ===
Trafford
| Party | Candidate | Votes | % | ±% |
|---|---|---|---|---|
| Conservative | A. Richardson | 598 | 51.4 | +10.3 |
| Liberal | T. Schofield* | 566 | 48.6 | −10.3 |
| Majority | | 32 | 2.8 | |
| Turnout | | 1,164 | | |
| Conservative gain from Liberal | | Swing | | |

=== Trinity ===
Trinity
| Party | Candidate | Votes | % | ±% |
|---|---|---|---|---|
| Liberal | R. W. Jones* | 752 | 50.1 | +15.1 |
| Conservative | J. Bradbury | 749 | 49.9 | −15.1 |
| Majority | | 3 | 0.2 | |
| Turnout | | 1,501 | | |
| Liberal hold | | Swing | | |

=== Weaste ===
Weaste
| Party | Candidate | Votes | % | ±% |
|---|---|---|---|---|
| Liberal | F. S. Phillips* | 579 | 72.9 | +23.6 |
| Ind. Labour Party | C. W. Fraser | 215 | 27.1 | N/A |
| Majority | | 364 | 45.8 | |
| Turnout | | 794 | | |
| Liberal hold | | Swing | | |

== Aldermanic elections ==
=== Aldermanic elections, 3 July 1895 ===
Caused by the death on 4 June 1895 of Alderman Peter Keevney (Conservative, elected as an alderman by the council on 9 November 1886).

In his place, Councillor Robert Balderstone (Conservative, Trinity, elected 13 November 1877) was elected as an alderman by the council on 3 July 1895.

| Party | Alderman | Ward | Term expires |
|---|---|---|---|
| Conservative | Robert Balderstone | Charlestown | 1898 |

Caused by the death on 12 June 1895 of Alderman Charles Makinson (Liberal, elected as an alderman by the council on 14 October 1881).

In his place, Councillor Thomas Robinson (Conservative, Islington, elected 24 January 1879) was elected as an alderman by the council on 3 July 1895.

| Party | Alderman | Ward | Term expires |
|---|---|---|---|
| Conservative | Thomas Robinson | St. Matthias' | 1895 |

== By-elections between 1894 and 1895 ==
=== By-elections, 23 July 1895 ===
Two by-elections were held on 23 July 1895 to fill vacancies that were created by the appointment of aldermen on 3 July 1895.

==== Islington ====
Caused by the election as an alderman of Councillor Thomas Robinson (Conservative, Islington, elected 24 January 1879) on 3 July 1895, following the death on 12 June 1895 of Alderman Charles Makinson (Liberal, elected as an alderman by the council on 14 October 1881).

Islington
| Party | Candidate | Votes | % | ±% |
|---|---|---|---|---|
| Conservative | W. Cruickshank | uncontested | | |
| Conservative hold | | Swing | | |

==== Trinity ====
Caused by the election as an alderman of Councillor Robert Balderstone (Conservative, Trinity, elected 13 November 1877) on 3 July 1895, following the death on 4 June 1895 of Alderman Peter Keevney (Conservative, elected as an alderman by the council on 9 November 1886).

Trinity
| Party | Candidate | Votes | % | ±% |
|---|---|---|---|---|
| Liberal Unionist | J. Baker | uncontested | | |
| Liberal Unionist gain from Conservative | | Swing | | |
