= Tommy Brown (footballer, born 1896) =

Scottish footballer (1896–1973)

Personal information
- Full name: Thomas Henry Staunton Brown
- Date of birth: 3 September 1896
- Place of birth: Dennistoun, Scotland
- Date of death: 1973 (aged 76)
- Place of death: County Durham, England
- Height: 5 ft 10 in (1.78 m)
- Position: Outside left

Senior career*
Years	Team	Apps	(Gls)
1914–191?	Darlington		
191?–1919	Close Works		
1919	Portsmouth	5	(0)
1919–19??	Spennymoor United		
	Norwich City	30	(1)
1920–1921	Brighton & Hove Albion		
1921–1922	Cardiff City	2	(0)
1922–1923	Bristol City	8	(0)
1923–1924	South Shields	20	(1)
1924–1925	Luton Town	15	(0)
1925–19??	Poole		
- Jarrow
	Ashington	0	(0)
- * Club domestic league appearances and goals

Thomas Henry Staunton Brown (3 September 1896 – 1973) was a Scottish professional footballer who made 59 appearances in the English Football League playing as an outside left for Brighton & Hove Albion, Cardiff City, Bristol City, South Shields and Luton Town.

== Life and career ==
Brown was born in 1896 in Dennistoun, Glasgow, the first child of George Brown, an engine fitter, and his wife Nellie. The family moved to England and settled in the Darlington area of County Durham, where Brown attended Haughton-le-Skerne School. By 1911, the 14-year-old Brown was an apprentice engine fitter in a locomotive works.

Brown was on the books of North-Eastern League club Darlington in 1914. When football resumed after the First World War, he played for the Close Works team before signing for Portsmouth, for which he made five Southern League appearances in the early part of the 1919–20 season. After even briefer spells with Spennymoor United of the North-Eastern League and Norwich City of the Southern, all on an amateur basis, Brown turned professional with Brighton & Hove Albion in January 1920. He went straight into their Southern League team, and kept his place for the first couple of months of the inaugural season of the Football League Third Division, but was displaced by Zach March and released at the end of that season.

For Cardiff City, Brown made two First Division appearances in early September 1921, failed to impress, and was dropped in favour of Jack Evans and not picked again. He made eight appearances as Bristol City won the 1922–23 Third Division South title, and then joined South Shields, where he played regularly in the Second Division for the first three months of the season. He was then left out for three months, and finished the season with 20 appearances and what proved to be his only Football League goal, the equaliser in a 1–1 draw with Bristol City on 26 April 1924, scored off the underside of the crossbar. Brown ended his Football League career with Luton Town before returning to non-league football with Poole of the Western League. He then returned to the North-Eastern League with Jarrow and Ashington, but did not appear in the latter's Football League side.

The 1939 Register finds Brown living with his wife, Emma, and four children in Billingham and working as a foreman fitter in the coke ovens. Brown died in 1973; his death at the age of 76 was registered in the Durham area in the first quarter of that year.
