= Félix Sienra =

Uruguayan sailor (1916–2023)

Personal information
- Nationality: Uruguay
- Born: 21 January 1916 Montevideo, Uruguay
- Died: 30 January 2023 (aged 107) Montevideo, Uruguay
- Occupation: Lawyer

Sport
- Sport: Sailing

Achievements and titles
- Olympic finals: 1948 Olympic Games

Félix Fructuoso Sienra Castellanos (21 January 1916 – 30 January 2023) was a Uruguayan sailor who competed in the 1948 Summer Olympics, finishing sixth.

He was a lawyer by profession.

In the 1948 Olympic Games, he sailed in the Firefly class and placed sixth out of 21 participants.

Sienra turned 100 in January 2016, and died on 30 January 2023, at the age of 107. On January 17 2023, he became the oldest known Olympian to have ever lived, overtaking Walter Walsh, who had died just short of his 107th birthday in 2014. Sienra died about two weeks later, aged 107 and 9 days. He is the only known Uruguayan Olympic centenarian.

== See also ==
- List of centenarians (sportspeople)
