= Charlie Emig =

American baseball player (1875–1975)

- Pitcher
- Born: April 5, 1875; Cincinnati, Ohio, U.S.
- Died: October 2, 1975 (aged 100); Oklahoma City, Oklahoma, U.S.
- Batted: Right Threw: Left

MLB debut
- September 4, 1896, for the Louisville Colonels

Last MLB appearance
- September 4, 1896, for the Louisville Colonels

MLB statistics
- Win–loss record: 0–1
- Earned run average: 7.88
- Strikeouts: 1
- Stats at Baseball Reference

Teams
- Louisville Colonels (1896)

Charles Henry Emig (April 5, 1875 – October 2, 1975) was an American professional baseball pitcher in Major League Baseball. He played in one game for the Louisville Colonels of the National League in 1896.

== Early life ==
Charles Henry Emig was born April 5, 1875, in Cincinnati, Ohio. He was the third of nine children born to manufacturing plant superintendent George Emig Sr. (1846–1904), a Bavarian immigrant who served as president of the Board of Education of Cincinnati from the Twelfth ward from 1879 to 1886 and he also served at various times on the Republican State and County Executive committees, and his Cincinnati-born wife, Mary (née Ziegler, 1851–1931). Little is known of Charlie's youth except that he was raised in Cincinnati (per the 1880 census) and in Bellevue, Kentucky (per the 1900 census), and attended school through the sixth grade (per the 1940 US Census).

== Professional baseball career ==
A tall left-hand pitcher, Emig broke into professional baseball in 1894 at the age of 18, signing with the Staunton Hayseeds of the Virginia League. He made his Roanoke debut on April 27, coming in as a ninth inning defensive replacement for injured right fielder named Thompson in an 8–3 victory over Norfolk. Emig's maiden pitching effort came days later, but he was "batted … very hard" by Petersburg in a 9–2 complete-game setback. Whether Emig got to pitch again is unclear, but he was apparently released by Staunton shortly thereafter (as his name disappears from ensuing game accounts). For the remainder of 1894, Emig's whereabouts and activities are unknown. It is likely that he went home and pitched for teams in and around Bellevue and/or Cincinnati.

On March 16, 1895, it was reported that Emig was a member of the Bellevue Browns of Bellevue, Ohio, but that he may sign with the Lima, Ohio team. In May 1895, Emig was pitching for the Cincinnati YMCA team in a game against a Maysville, Kentucky team and he was touted as a "good thing," but he "didn't pan out. He left his feet at the breakaway and was sent to the stable." Charlie was signed by the Norwood, Ohio baseball team on June 27, 1895. At the season's end, Emig returned to Bellevue.

In 1896, he was back with the Bellevue Browns. He pitched his last game for the Browns on August 29, 1896, and it was noted that "after the game at Portsmouth he leaves for Washington City to join the Louisvilles." Emig's pitching had attracted the attention of Cincinnati Reds player-manager Buck Ewing who voiced the opinion that "the Bellevue southpaw Emig would make an excellent pitcher with more experience and more weight." Earlier, it had been reported that Ewing intended to audition "Charles Emig, the famous twirler of the Bellevue Browns, in a game against Louisville." On that same August 29 date, the Cleveland Plain Dealer reported that, on their way back from a trip to Chicago, "the Reds tried their new left-handed pitcher Emig" in an exhibition game against an independent pro club in Dayton. "He was very effective and would have shut out Dayton, but Rhines was put in and Dayton scored to runs" in the ninth. Emig was the winning pitcher in the 8–2 Cincinnati victory, striking out five. Given this, how Emig ended up with the NL-doormat Louisville Colonels is something of a mystery. Whatever the reason, Emig left home shortly after his Cincinnati tryout to join the Louisville Colonels.

Emig had the fortune or misfortune to be joining the Louisville Colonels who were one of the worst teams in baseball history. That year, the team managed to win only 38 games while losing 93 for a .290 winning percentage. The team was managed by Bill McGunnigle who had a three-year major league career as a pitcher and outfielder. McGunnigle then was a very successful manager in Brooklyn for three years. When Emig joined the Colonels, they were solidly in last place with 29 wins and 80 losses (a .266 winning percentage).

Emig finally made the lineup when he started the first game of a doubleheader with the Washington Nationals in Washington, DC on Friday, September 4, 1896. It was Ladies' Day at the park and there were a reported 5,000 people at the game for the doubleheader. This was to be his only major league appearance.

Emig pitched well for the first four innings, giving up just one hit and one run. The Colonels made eight errors in the fifth inning. The first baseman, Jim Rogers, made three of the errors on throws from the infielders. The Colonels made a total of ten errors during the game, including four by the outfielders. Emig did not help himself as he walked seven and hit three batters. Washington made 17 runs on 12 hits, seven walks, and three hit batsmen during the game, though only seven of the runs were earned. Emig ended up with a career 7.88 earned run average (ERA) and one strikeout.

The Buffalo Enquirer reported that "the trial was not a fair one, and McGunnigale must have been influenced by some of the clique to turn Emig down. Clarke, George Miller, Billy Clingman and Jack Crooks treated Emig nicely. The majority of the others looked upon him as an intruder." Emig never received a second chance to pitch in the majors.

Following the 1896 season, Charlie signed with the Dayton Old Soldiers of the Interstate League in 1897. In mid-July he was traded to a league rival, the Mansfield Haymakers. In exchange for Emig and infielder Chick Cargo, Dayton received infielder Else Mangan and catcher Frank Carroll. Emig's won-loss record was not discovered, but he reportedly had an eight-game win streak in late summer. In 25 games combined between his two clubs, he posted a sparkling 1.24 ERA. He also fielded his position well (.963 FA). Emig was not listed, however, among ISL batsmen, a statistical aberration. Reserved by Mansfield for the 1898 season, Emig returned home to Bellevue where he unleashed some unflattering commentary on the leadership of Mansfield field captain Arlie Latham. That winter, the good-sized Emig played tackle for a Cincinnati football club called the Newports. One of his first roommates, according to Emig, was Hall of Famer Elmer Flick (probably on the Dayton, Ohio team in 1897).

Despite disdain of captain Latham, Emig re-signed with Mansfield for the upcoming 1898 season. But he pitched poorly and was released in early June. He subsequently hooked on with Springfield Governors of the ISL but fared no better. Upon his termination by Springfield in early August, Emig telegraphed league president Charles B. Powers seeking engagement as an umpire. He received no response. For his two ISL clubs, Emig went 5–12 in 22 appearances. Although only 23 years old, Charlie Emig's days in organized baseball were behind him. After a short stay home, he left to become the manager of a club in Greenville, Ohio. Thereafter, Emig appears to have confined himself to playing for amateur and semipro clubs.

== After baseball ==
Charlie married Ida May Hooper on September 17, 1903, in Scioto, Ohio. The wedding article notes that "Emig is the big pitcher of the Portsmouth ball club. He has been playing with the local team for only two months, but has many friends here who will wish him joy." That article also states that "Mr. Emig is a machinist by trade and worked all last winter with Deschler Bros. He has more friends in this city than any ball player who was ever here. Many did not like his playing and told him so but all voted him the most gentlemanly and best all-around fellow that ever donned a uniform." Emig may have attempted a pro ball comeback in 1905 with the Charleston Sea Gulls of the Class C Southern Atlantic League as Sporting Life reported a "Charles Emig" was released by the club in early March.

The 1917 World War I draft registration has Charles and Ida living in Buffalo, New York. Emig's occupation is "foreman, Bessemer Truck Sales."

Emig married Eva Leona Blatchley December 1, 1923, in Buffalo. By 1930, they were living in Oklahoma City with her parents, and Charlie was working as a florist in a flower shop. The 1940 census also has Emig living in Oklahoma City. His occupation was "managing caretaker, apartment houses." The 1945 Oklahoma City directory lists his occupation as "painter."

Emig was interviewed by an unidentified newspaper when he was 94 years old. The newspaper article states that Emig played minor league and professional baseball from 1892 to 1906 with a number of teams. In the article, Emig related that "about the best I was ever paid was $90 a month and out of that I had to pay my expenses while we were playing at home." The article also notes that he played some games at first base. The article notes that Charlie was "still in excellent health, he has a handshake as powerful as any, mows his own grass, keeps a garden and does his own housework." "One day I got homesick and put my bag on my back and hitched home," said Emig while explaining how his career came to an end. The article notes that he enjoyed watching baseball games on TV and that Lou Gehrig, Mickey Mantle, and Johnny Bench are among his favorite players. The article also goes on to mention that Charlie met Babe Ruth "when he was just beginning his era of greatness" and his analysis of Ruth was that "actually Babe Ruth was only a good hitter and nothing else, plus he was hard to get along with."

In an interview when he was 99 years old, Emig discussed Hank Aaron's 714th home run and stated "I'm glad he got it. … He earned it just as well as the Babe." In discussing other current players, Emig stated that "the only one I would take my hat off to is Johnny Bench. He's a great catcher and the catcher has more to do with winning the game than the pitcher." He also tells of when he and Flick first arrived in Louisville. "Elmer was a farm boy. He came in with a carpet grip and a bunch of bats his father had made for him. Everybody got a kick out of that. But he was everything a ball player could be."

Charlie Emig turned 100 in 1975 and died in October of that year, in Oklahoma City. He is buried in Memorial Park Cemetery, Oklahoma City. He was survived by his wife Eva, and his daughters, Virginia Mae Emig Abel and Beverly Joan Emig Murray.

== See also ==
- List of centenarians (Major League Baseball players)
- List of centenarians (sportspeople)

Records
Preceded by Ralph Miller	Oldest recognized verified living baseball player May 7, 1973 – October 2, 1975	Succeeded by Paddy Livingston
