= Diran Manoukian =

French field hockey player (1919–2020)

Diran Manoukian (22 March 1919 – 5 May 2020) was a French field hockey player who competed in three Olympic Games. With the French team he finished 10th in 1948, fifth in 1952 and 10th in 1960. Manoukian celebrated his 100th birthday in March 2019 and died on 5 May 2020.

== See also ==
- List of centenarians (sportspeople)
