= Sam Latter =

Scottish footballer (1904–2010)

Personal information
- Full name: Samuel Latter
- Date of birth: 4 January 1904
- Place of birth: Glasgow, Scotland
- Date of death: 6 June 2010 (aged 106)
- Place of death: Edinburgh, Scotland
- Position: Left back

Senior career*
Years	Team	Apps	(Gls)
–	Kilsyth Rangers		
1928–1931	Third Lanark	55	(1)
- * Club domestic league appearances and goals

Samuel Latter (4 January 1904 – 6 June 2010) was a Scottish footballer who played as a left back in the Scottish Football League for Third Lanark. His spell as a player was brief, but decades later he was featured in national media after becoming Scotland's oldest-living man, a title he held for ten months until his death at 106. He is the longest-lived footballer.

== Life ==
The son of a Jewish tailor who emigrated from the Russian Empire, he was raised in the Gorbals area of Glasgow. After joining Third Lanark from Kilsyth Rangers in 1928, the "giant defender" was a member of the squad which was relegated from Scottish Division One in 1928–29 but also a regular as they went back up as winners of Division Two in 1930–31, and joined the club tour of Denmark that summer. Latter is among the only Scottish Jews to have played football professionally.

Latter married an Edinburgh woman and relocated to the Scottish capital in 1931 (they joined the Edinburgh Hebrew Congregation from its inception), and having lost his place in the first team at Third Lanark to James Warden, he soon decided to retire from football and pursue other career options. He served in the Royal Air Force during World War II and latterly trained fighter pilots, ran a confectionery store on Lothian Road and operated a tyre business in Lauriston, while living in Liberton. His wife Flora predeceased him in 1990, and in 2001 he moved into 'Strachan House', a care home in Blackhall.

Latter was the oldest living man in Scotland between August 2009 and his death in June 2010, and for a few weeks was the oldest living Jew in Britain. In a list of oldest documented sportspeople, he is the oldest worldwide to have been a footballer (as of April 2024 – the list is not necessarily definitive).
