= Pietro Righetti =

Italian cyclist (1899–2001)

Personal information
- Born: 4 January 1899
- Died: 9 October 2001 (aged 102)

Cycling career
- Sport: Cycling
- Discipline: Road
- Role: Rider

Pietro Righetti (4 January 1899 – 9 October 2001) was an Italian racing cyclist. He rode in the 1928 Tour de France.

== See also ==
- List of centenarians (sportspeople)
