= Magda Fedor =

Hungarian sports shooter

Personal information
- Nicknames: Aunt Baby, Aunt Georgie
- Nationality: Hungarian
- Born: 14 January 1914 Pinkaszentkirály, Kingdom of Hungary
- Died: 8 December 2017 (aged 103)
- Years active: 1939–1979
- Spouse: Lajos Kisgyörgy

Sport
- Country: Hungary
- Sport: Sports shooting
- Club: Budapesti Honvéd SE
- Coached by: Lajos Kisgyörgy

Magda Fedor (Mrs. Lajos Kisgyörgy, 14 January 1914 – 8 December 2017) was a Hungarian sports shooter, 123-time national champion, multiple World Championships and European Championships medalist.

== Early life ==
Fedor was born in Pinkaszentkirály (today part of Vasalja, Hungary) in 1914 as the fifth child of the family, who soon moved to nearby Szombathely, where Fedor grew up and studied in the local girls' gymnasium. During her school years she practised figure skating and tennis; being a talented tennis player she was signed by local club Szombathelyi SE, where she played alongside József Asbóth, who later won the French Open.

== Career ==
In 1938, she married flight lieutenant Lajos Kisgyörgy, whom she met in the tennis club. The couple first moved to Székesfehérvár, then settled in Budapest. Kisgyörgy, an outstanding pentathlete of his time and later a renowned shooting coach, introduced sport shooting to Fedor, who pursued a competitive career from 1939. Coached by her husband, Fedor competed till 1979, during which period she won 123 Hungarian national championship titles in different disciplines and positions, including 68 single victories and a triumph in the men's field. Additionally, she set a number of national records.

Fedor also participated at several European and World Championships; she collected two silver medals and six bronze medals at European Championships and one silver and two bronze medals at World events. She never had the chance to take part at the Olympic Games, since sport shooting for women was introduced to the Olympic program only in 1984.

After retiring from competitive sport, Fedor became a shooting coach. Among the clubs she coached are KSI SE, Zalka SE – the club of the National Military Technical College – and Óbuda Lövész Egyesület; most recently, aged over 90, coaching the shooters of Igazságügyi Minisztérium Duna Lövészklubja.

== Personal life ==
Fedor had two nicknames. At home she was called Baba (Baby), which became Baba néni (Aunt Baby) in adulthood and she was known by this name among shooters. The Hungarian pentathlon national team gave her the nickname Gyuri néni (Aunt Georgie), a transformation of her husband's nickname Gyuri bácsi (Uncle Georgie).

Fedor's daughter, Magda is an all-round sportsperson who won national titles in alpine skiing, shooting and tennis; her son, Lajos Jr. also continued the family tradition and became a sport shooter. Her grandchild, Gergely Kisgyörgy is a professional tennis player and multiple Hungarian Tennis Championships winner in doubles. He also played for the Hungary Davis Cup team, winning 16 of his 24 singles rubbers and 7 out of his 13 doubles matches. Fedor died on 8 December 2017 at the age of 103.

== See also ==
- List of centenarians (sportspeople)
