= Lajos Kisgyörgy =

Hungarian sports shooter and coach

Lajos Kisgyörgy (Hungarian pronunciation: [ˈlɒjoʃ ˈkiʒɟørɟ]; 11 January 1909 – 6 February 1976) was a Hungarian sport shooter and shooting coach.

Born in Beszterce, Austrian-Hungarian Empire (now Bistrița, Romania), he graduated from the Ludovica Military Academy in 1931, subsequently he was assigned to the Hungarian Air Force. He left the army in 1947 in captain rank.

A renowned sports shooter, he was member of the team that won the Hungarian championship of the sport pistol event in 1942. After World War II, starting from 1951, he became the coach of the sports shooting department of Budapesti Honvéd SE. In addition, he trained the Hungarian pentathlon national team, and from 1963 he also served as the coach of the Hungarian shooting national team.

Kisgyörgy married to Magda Fedor in 1932. Under his guidance, Fedor became the winningest Hungarian female sport shooter with 123 national titles in her 40-year-long career. They had two children; Magda is an all-round sportsperson, who won Hungarian national championships in alpine skiing, sport shooting and tennis. Their son, Lajos Jr. is a sport shooter and once was part of the Hungarian national team. Their grandchild, Gergely Kisgyörgy is a professional tennis player and multiple Hungarian Tennis Championships winner in doubles. He also played for the Hungary Davis Cup team.
