= Ernie Crossan =

Australian cricketer

Personal information
- Full name: Ernest Eric Crossan
- Born: 3 November 1915; Melbourne, Victoria, Australia
- Died: 10 August 2009 (aged 93); Batemans Bay, New South Wales, Australia
- Batting: Right-handed
- Bowling: Right-arm medium
- Role: Batsman

Domestic team information
- Years: Team
- 1937/38–1945/46: New South Wales
- FC debut: 4 December 1937 New South Wales v Victoria
- Last FC: 22 December 1945 New South Wales v Victoria

Career statistics
Competition	First-class
Matches	4
Runs scored	103
Batting average	14.71
100s/50s	0/0
Top score	35*
Balls bowled	312
Wickets	1
Bowling average	96.00
5 wickets in innings	0
10 wickets in match	0
Best bowling	1/20
Catches/stumpings	2/–
- Source: Cricket Archive, 4 November 2009

Ernest Eric Crossan (3 November 1915 – 10 August 2009) was an Australian cricketer. Having played as a right-handed batsman and right-arm medium pace bowler for New South Wales from 1937 to 1946, Crossan was at the time of his death the last surviving New South Wales player to have appeared for the team before the Second World War. "He was the last link to an era of great players, including former Australian representatives, Stan McCabe, Bill O'Reilly, Bert Oldfield, Sid Barnes, Arthur Chipperfield and Jack Fingleton, who all played alongside Ern in his debut match in 1937" wrote David Gilbert, Chief Executive of the club.

Crossan played four first class games in his career, scoring 103 runs at 14.71, with a best of 35*. He took a single wicket. His death left Harold Stapleton as the oldest surviving New South Wales player.
