= Ralph Miller (right-handed pitcher) =

American baseball player (1873–1973)

- Pitcher
- Born: March 15, 1873; Cincinnati, Ohio, U.S.
- Died: May 7, 1973 (aged 100); Cincinnati, Ohio, U.S.
- Batted: Right Threw: Right

MLB debut
- May 6, 1898, for the Brooklyn Bridegrooms

Last MLB appearance
- May 26, 1899, for the Baltimore Orioles

MLB statistics
- Win–loss record: 5–17
- Earned run average: 5.18
- Strikeouts: 46
- Stats at Baseball Reference

Teams
- Brooklyn Bridegrooms (1898); Baltimore Orioles (1899)

Ralph Darwin Miller (March 15, 1873 – May 7, 1973) was an American right-handed pitcher in Major League Baseball who played for the Brooklyn Bridegrooms and Baltimore Orioles during the 1898 and 1899 baseball seasons.

== Biography ==
Born in Cincinnati, he died there at age 100; he was the first major league player to live to his 100th birthday. At the time of his death he was believed to be the last surviving 19th century Major Leaguer, a title which he unofficially held until the 1990s when baseball researchers discovered that Charlie Emig, a pitcher who played in one game in 1896 and died in 1975, held that distinction.

== See also ==
- List of centenarians (Major League Baseball players)
- List of centenarians (sportspeople)

Records
Preceded by John Hollison	Oldest recognized verified living baseball player August 19, 1969 – May 7, 1973	Succeeded by Charlie Emig
