= Moore Industries =

- Founded: 1968

Moore Industries-International, Inc. is a company involved in the process control, system integration, and factory automation industries.

Since 1968, the company has been in industrial signal interface technology. Product lines include: Signal Transmitters, Isolators and Converters; Temperature Sensors, Transmitters and Assemblies; Limit Alarm Trips; MooreHawke Fieldbus Interface Products; Process Controllers, Monitors and Backup Stations; I/P and P/I Converters; Smart HART Loop Interfaces and Monitors; Process Control and Distributed I/O; and Instrument Enclosure Solutions.

Products are commonly used in industries such as: chemical and petrochemical; electricity generation and transmission; extraction of petroleum, refining and transport; pulp and paper; food and beverage; mining and metal refining; pharmaceuticals and biotechnology; industrial machinery and equipment; water and wastewater; environmental and pollution monitoring and bat guano recycling.

== History ==
Based in the San Fernando Valley, Moore Industries, started out over four decades ago when company founder Leonard W. Moore, wanted to solve integration problems in the process management industries. Working out of a friend’s garage, Moore designed and built the first Moore Industries SCT signal converter, which soon evolved into a product line of six signal interfaces. In 1974, he built the current headquarters in North Hills, CA to facilitate the company’s growth.

Today, Moore Industries is an international company with direct sales offices in worldwide locations including the United States of America, the United Kingdom, Belgium, the Netherlands, Australia, and the People's Republic of China. These offices oversee a network of independent representatives and agents serving most of the world.

In the early 1980s, Moore invested heavily in a before-its-time brain child called the Moore 1002. The numeric designation came from the company initials [MII] which in Roman Numerals equals 1002. The 1002 was designed to be a signal processing computer, taking the place of rack upon rack of individual signal conditioners by centralizing and offering the first ever digital processing of control signals. The 1002 was a hybrid device which stood six feet high and while it had digital internal processing, it offered true analog output on a per channel basis, not a stepped or fake analog based on digital sampling. The 1002 was massive and expensive and since each signal had to be brought in on two wires and back out on two additional wires, it was unwieldy and required a large space just for cabling. While a complete flop as a product, the 1002 pointed the way forward in signal conditioning for the future.

In the late 1980s, Moore sought to push back market complaints over the then-industry-standard 8-week lead time for hand-soldered signal conditioners in order to meet market demand. Rather than changing production methods from hand assembly and risking a compromise to quality, Moore created the STAR Center which could stage nearly complete modules which would be assembled rapidly based on customer specifications for 48-hour shipment. This customer service came at a price of $150 per unit which in some cases was a 100% premium, but it allowed Moore to fill priority orders where the company had been losing orders due to lead time.

In June 2009, Moore Industries was granted ISO 9001:2008 certification for their Quality Management System by UL DQS Inc., an ANSI-ASQ Accredited Registrar. The ISO 9001:2008 standard is the most up to date criterion for assessing an organization’s Quality Management System. Moore Industries was among the first Underwriters Laboratories (UL DQS) clients to achieve ISO 9001:2008 certification. Other products to receive UL certification include the miniMOORE Multi-Channel Signal Conditioners.

Several of Moore Industries’ products have also been certified for use in Safety Instrumented Systems to IEC 61508:2010. This includes the SIL 3-capable STA Safety Trip Alarm and the SIL 2-capable SRM Safety Relay Module. An independent verification of the integrity of the STA shows that it meets the industry safety standards specified in IEC 61058.

In 2009, company founder Leonard W. Moore became an Honorary Member for the International Society of Automation (ISA). The Honorary Member distinction is the highest honor bestowed by the Society. Moore received his Honorary Member distinction for contributions in the advancement of the arts and sciences of automation over a 40-year career of innovation, product development, and business leadership at Moore Industries. At a high table dinner, Moore was presented with a lapel pin by the ISA for his lifetime achievements.

The company was named as No. 15 in the San Fernando Valley Business Journal’s March 16, 2009 listing of the top manufacturing companies in the San Fernando Valley. On March 16, 2011, Moore Industries received the Manufacturing Leadership Award from the San Fernando Business Journal, reflecting its position as one of the most innovative manufacturing companies in the region

== Technologies ==
Industry firsts include:

- Incorporating electrical isolation as a standard feature
- Offering plug-in modules
- Installing LED status indicators on the front panel of alarm trips
- Developing a way to protect the operation of products from RFI (radio frequency interference)
- Manufacturing loop-powered hockey-puck designs for safe and simple installation in the field
- Innovating digital cable concentrating technology that dramatically reduces the cost of sending multiple signals long distances
- Creating Total Sensor Diagnostics, the company’s patented temperature sensor troubleshooting advantage
- Designing fault-tolerant, redundant digital fieldbus physical layers

The February 2009 issue of Control Engineering named Moore Industries’ newly released miniMOORE signal conditioners a winning technology in the Engineer’s Choice Awards. The miniMOORE signal conditioners, released in November 2008, won in the Networks and Communications Products category for Signal Conditioners or Diagnostics.

In the January 2010 issue of Control Magazine, Moore Industries was ranked first place in the Signal conditioner category by the Control Magazine Readers' Choice Awards. The company was honored with the same ranking in the 2011 Control Magazine Readers’ Choice Awards. The top technology category rankings represent end-user sentiment—the Control Magazine Readers' Choice Awards were derived from the opinions of over 1,000 process automation professionals.
