= Bruno Frietsch =

Finnish sports shooter

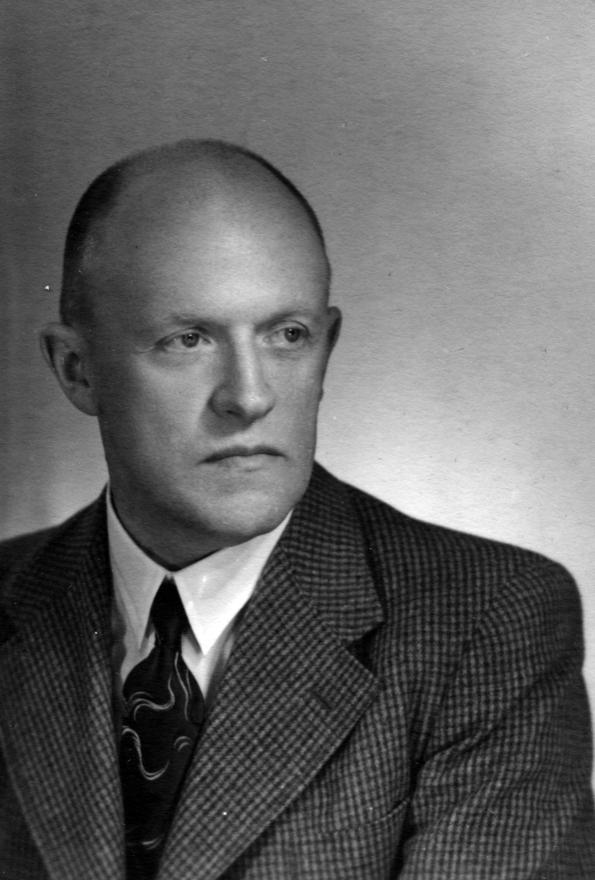

Personal information
- Born: 2 December 1896 Hanko, Finland
- Died: 9 December 1996 (aged 100) Kerava, Finland

Sport
- Sport: Sports shooting

Bruno Frietsch (2 December 1896 – 9 December 1996) was a Finnish sports shooter. He competed in the 50 m rifle event at the 1936 Summer Olympics.

== See also ==
- List of centenarians (sportspeople)
