= Harold Stapleton =

Australian cricketer

Personal information
- Full name: Harold Vincent Stapleton
- Born: 7 January 1915; Kyogle, New South Wales, Australia
- Died: 24 September 2015 (aged 100)
- Batting: Left-handed
- Bowling: Left-arm medium

Domestic team information
- Years: Team
- 1941: New South Wales

Career statistics
Competition	FC
Matches	1
Runs scored	1
Batting average	1.00
100s/50s	0/0
Top score	1
Balls bowled	80
Wickets	0
Bowling average	n/a
5 wickets in innings	0
10 wickets in match	0
Best bowling	0/9
Catches/stumpings	2/-
- Source: CricketArchive, 7 December 2012

Harold Vincent Stapleton (7 January 1915 – 24 September 2015) was an Australian cricketer who played a single first-class match for New South Wales in 1941. He was one of only three Australian first-class cricketers to live past the age of 100, the others being Ted Martin and Jack Laver.

Born in Kyogle, New South Wales, Stapleton played in a number of minor matches during the 1930s, including for Lismore, Northern New South Wales, and the New South Wales colts and second XI teams. He played his single first-class match for New South Wales against South Australia in February 1941, the final match of the war-interrupted 1940–41 season. He scored one run in New South Wales' only innings, and failed to take a wicket from ten eight-ball overs, opening the bowling with Vic Jackson. Stapleton enlisted in the Australian Imperial Force in April of the same year, serving as a corporal in the Australian Army.

Having served in New Guinea, Stapleton was discharged from service in January 1946, and took up employment with an oil company based in Wollongong. He continued to play cricket with St George in the Sydney grade cricket competition, and finished his career with 2,242 runs at an average of 32.49 and 93 wickets at an average of 17.56. On the death of Ernie Crossan in August 2009, Stapleton became the oldest living Australian first-class cricketer. Stapleton died at the age of 100 on 24 September 2015. He was the oldest lived New South Wales cricketer, surpassing George Moore's record.

== See also ==
- List of centenarians (sportspeople)
- List of New South Wales representative cricketers
