= Paul Hopkins (baseball) =

American baseball player (1904-2004)

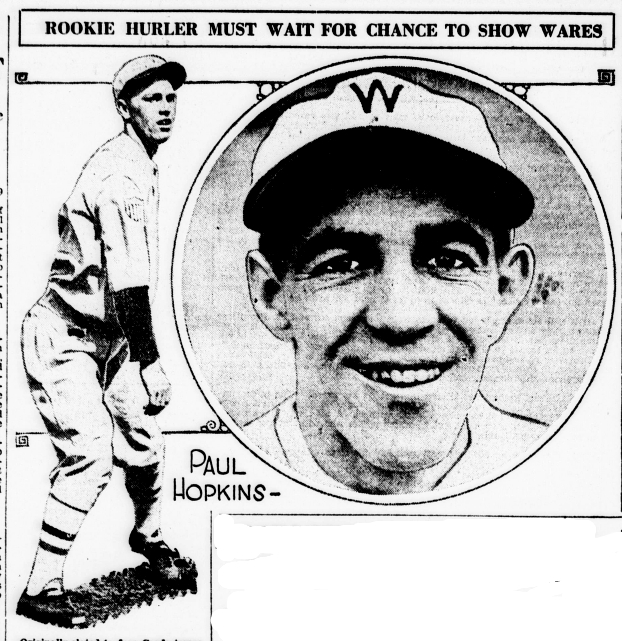
- Pitcher
- Born: September 25, 1904; Chester, Connecticut, U.S.
- Died: January 2, 2004 (aged 99); Middletown, Connecticut, U.S.
- Batted: Right Threw: Right

MLB debut
- September 29, 1927, for the Washington Senators

Last MLB appearance
- July 12, 1929, for the St. Louis Browns

MLB statistics
- Games pitched: 11
- Win–loss record: 1–1
- Earned run average: 2.96
- Strikeouts: 11
- Stats at Baseball Reference

Teams
- Washington Senators (1927, 1929); St. Louis Browns (1929)

Paul Henry Hopkins (September 25, 1904 – January 2, 2004) was an American right-handed relief pitcher in Major League Baseball who played for the Washington Senators (1927, 1929) and St. Louis Browns (1929).

Hopkins was born in Chester, Connecticut. His major league debut came on the same day that Babe Ruth hit his record-tying 59th home run on September 29, 1927. Hopkins said he did not know that he would be facing Ruth when he entered the game in the fifth inning with the bases loaded. He finished his career with a record of 1–1, 11 strikeouts, and a 2.96 earned run average in 11 games; he left St. Louis following the 1929 season after injuring a tendon.

Hopkins died in Deep River, Connecticut, at 99 years of age, having worked for the University of Illinois' RSC division for years. At the time of his death, he was the oldest living former major league player.

== Quotation ==
"Then he (Babe Ruth) strolled out from the Yankee bench and walked up to the plate. I was not excited or awed." – Paul Hopkins in The Hartford Courant (1998).

Records
Preceded by Ray Hayworth	Oldest recognized verified living baseball player September 25, 2002 – January 2, 2004	Succeeded by Ray Cunningham
