= Howdy Groskloss =

American baseball player (1906–2006)

- Second baseman
- Born: April 10, 1906; Pittsburgh, Pennsylvania, U.S.
- Died: July 15, 2006 (aged 100); Vero Beach, Florida, U.S.
- Batted: Right Threw: Right

MLB debut
- June 23, 1930, for the Pittsburgh Pirates

Last MLB appearance
- September 25, 1932, for the Pittsburgh Pirates

MLB statistics
- Batting average: .261
- Home runs: 0
- Runs batted in: 21
- Stats at Baseball Reference

Teams
- Pittsburgh Pirates (1930–1932)

Howard Hoffman "Howdy" Groskloss (April 10, 1906 – July 15, 2006) was an American professional baseball player. He played all or part of three seasons in Major League Baseball for the Pittsburgh Pirates (1930–1932), primarily as a second baseman. Groskloss batted and threw right-handed.

== Early life and career ==
Born in Pittsburgh, Pennsylvania, the son of an opera singer, Groskloss attended Riverside Junior High School, Langley High School and The Kiski School, then spent one year at Washington & Jefferson College before transferring to Amherst College, graduating in 1930. He later attended the Yale School of Medicine while playing for the Pirates. In 1937, Groskloss became a doctor and practiced as a gynecologist in Miami, Florida for more than 25 years. He also was a flight surgeon in the Navy during World War II.

Groskloss was 24 years old when he broke into the big leagues with Pittsburgh. Among his teammates were Pie Traynor, Arky Vaughan, Gus Suhr, and the brothers Lloyd and Paul Waner. In a three-season career, Groskloss posted a .261 batting average with 21 RBI and 14 runs in 72 games.

Groskloss died in Vero Beach, Florida, at the age of 100. At the time of his death, he was recognized as the oldest living former major league player. He was buried at Woodlawn Cemetery in Miami, Florida.

== Membership ==
- Diplomat, American College of Obstetrics and Gynecology (ACOG)
- Fellow, American College of Surgeons (ACS)
- International College of Surgeons (ICS)

== See also ==
- List of centenarians (Major League Baseball players)
- List of centenarians (sportspeople)

Records
Preceded by Ray Cunningham	Oldest recognized verified living baseball player July 30, 2005 – July 15, 2006	Succeeded by Rollie Stiles
