= Lee Tsuntung =

Chinese basketball player

Personal information
- Nationality: Chinese
- Born: 11 April 1916; Tianjin, China
- Died: 24 February 2017 (aged 100); Shanghai, China

Sport
- Sport: Basketball

Lee Tsuntung (11 April 1916 – 24 February 2017) was a Chinese basketball player. He competed in the men's tournament at the 1948 Summer Olympics, playing in a total of 7 games.

== See also ==
- List of centenarians (sportspeople)
