= Ray Cunningham =

American baseball player (1905–2005)

- Third baseman
- Born: January 17, 1905; Mesquite, Texas, U.S.
- Died: July 30, 2005 (aged 100); Pearland, Texas, U.S.
- Batted: Right Threw: Right

MLB debut
- September 16, 1931, for the St. Louis Cardinals

Last MLB appearance
- June 18, 1932, for the St. Louis Cardinals

MLB statistics
- Batting average: .154
- Hits: 4
- Stats at Baseball Reference

Teams
- St. Louis Cardinals (1931–1932)

Raymond Lee Cunningham (January 17, 1905 – July 30, 2005) was an American professional baseball third baseman in Major League Baseball who played for the St. Louis Cardinals in 1931 and 1932. He batted and threw right-handed. A native of Mesquite, Texas, Cunningham played briefly for the Cardinals at third base before an injury cut short his career. He injured himself, whipping a sidearm throw to first base on a swinging bunt.

== Life ==
Cunningham was a 26-year-old rookie when he joined the Cardinals for the final weeks of the 1931 season. His salary was $500 a year. During his time with St. Louis, Cunningham roomed with two Cardinal legends, Dizzy Dean and Pepper Martin. In a two-season career, Cunningham was a .154 hitter with one RBI and no home runs in 14 games.

Following his retirement as a player, Cunningham worked as a salesman and for an oil company. In 2004, he was recognized as the oldest living former Major League Baseball player. He gained this distinction when a former pitcher for the old Washington Senators and St. Louis Browns, Paul Hopkins, died in 2004 at 99 years of age. Cunningham was honored at the Texas Baseball Hall of Fame with a special plaque celebrating his life in baseball. He remained a baseball fan and kept a daily watch on the Houston Astros.

Cunningham died in Pearland, Texas at 100 years of age. With his death, the distinction of oldest living former major league player moved to Howdy Groskloss.

== See also ==
- List of centenarians (Major League Baseball players)
- List of centenarians (sportspeople)

Records
Preceded by Paul Hopkins	Oldest recognized verified living baseball player January 2, 2004 – July 30, 2005	Succeeded by Howdy Groskloss
