= Tony Colobro =

American football coach and administrator (1923–2024)

Biographical details
- Born: December 22, 1923
- Died: March 3, 2024 (aged 100); Tazewell, Virginia, U.S.

Playing career

Football
- c. 1940s: Concord

Basketball
- c. 1940s: Concord
- Positions: Back (football); Guard (basketball)

Coaching career (HC unless noted)

Football
- 1958–1963: Welch HS (WV)
- 1964–1970: Bluefield State
- 1974–1982: Concord

Administrative career (AD unless noted)
- 1964–1974: Bluefield State

Head coaching record
- Overall: 101–45–7 (college)
- Bowls: 4–2
- Tournaments: 0–3 (NAIA D-I playoffs)

Accomplishments and honors

Championships
- 5 WVIAC (1976–1978, 1980–1981); 6 WVIAC Southern Division (1974–1978, 1980)

Awards
- Bluefield State Hall of Fame (2014); Concord Hall of Fame (1995); NAIA Hall of Fame (1985); 4× WVIAC Coach of the Year (1976–1978, 1980)

Tony John Colobro (December 22, 1923 – March 3, 2024) was an American college football coach and administrator.

== Early life and playing career ==
Colobro was born on December 22, 1923, and was raised in Welch, West Virginia. He attended Welch High School and as a senior in 1942, he was named team captain of the basketball team. He also earned First-team All-State honors as a guard.

Colobro attended and played college football and basketball for Concord.

== Coaching career ==
In 1958, Colobro was named head football coach for his alma mater, Welch High School, after the resignation of John Suba.

In 1964, Colobro was named head football coach and athletic director for Bluefield State. As athletic director he hired Emory and Henry basketball coach Tony Mandeville to the same position as Bluefield State. Colobro resigned as head football coach in 1971 to focus solely on his athletic director duties. In seven years as head coach, he led the team to an overall record of 31–19–4, including a 7–1 record in 1970.

In 1974, Colobro returned to coaching as the head football coach for his alma mater, Concord. He took over a team that finished the previous season winless at 0–9 with only 23 players on the roster. In nine seasons as head coach, Colobro amassed an overall record of 70–26–3, finishing with five West Virginia Intercollegiate Athletic Conference (WVIAC) championships.

In 1985, Colobro was elected into the National Association of Intercollegiate Athletics (NAIA) Hall of Fame. He was elected into the Concord and Bluefield State halls of fame in 1995 and 2014 respectively.

== Personal life ==
Colobro died on March 3, 2024, in a retirement home in Tazewell, Virginia.

== Head coaching record ==
=== College ===
Year	Team	Overall	Conference	Standing	Bowl/playoffs	NAIA D1/D2^{#}
Bluefield State Big Blues (West Virginia Intercollegiate Athletic Conference) (1964–1970)
1964	Bluefield State	5–2	3–1	2nd		
1965	Bluefield State	6–1–1	3–1–1	2nd		
1966	Bluefield State	4–1–2	2–1–2	4th		
1967	Bluefield State	2–6–1	1–6–1	7th		
1968	Bluefield State	3–4	3–4	T–6th		
1969	Bluefield State	4–4	3–3	6th		
1970	Bluefield State	7–1	5–1	2nd		12
Bluefield State:		31–19–4	20–17–4			
Concord Mountain Lions (West Virginia Intercollegiate Athletic Conference) (1974–1982)
1974	Concord	6–5	3–1	T–1st (Southern)	L Shrine Bowl	
1975	Concord	6–5	4–0	1st (Southern)	L Shrine Bowl	
1976	Concord	8–3	4–0	1st (Southern)	W Coal Bowl	T–19
1977	Concord	9–2–1	4–0	1st (Southern)	W Coal Bowl	4
1978	Concord	10–2	8–1	1st (Southern)	W Coal Bowl, L NAIA Division I Quarterfinal	6
1979	Concord	5–3–2	4–3–2	2nd (Southern)		
1980	Concord	11–1	9–0	1st (Southern)	W Coal Bowl, L NAIA Division I Quarterfinal	3
1981	Concord	9–2	7–1	T–1st	L NAIA Division I Quarterfinal	4
1982	Concord	6–3	6–2	T–2nd		20
Concord:		70–26–3	49–8–2			
Total:		101–45–7				
National championship Conference title Conference division title or championship game berth
