= Leonard W. Moore =

Leonard W. Moore (November 26, 1933 – September 6, 2019) was the founder of Moore Industries-International, a manufacturer for the process control, system integration, and factory automation industries.

At the age of 16, he graduated from high school and attended Iowa State University, where he obtained a BS in electrical engineering. After graduating, Moore joined the army in 1953 as a weapons guidance specialist and spent time at Fort Sill, Oklahoma, and Fort Bliss, Texas.

After returning from the US Army anti-aircraft artillery, where he taught radar and mechanical analog computers, he worked at Hughes Aircraft, Swanson Engineering, Ronan Engineering and Waugh Controls Corporation. At these companies, he created industry-first, practical and instrumentation solutions.

Moore founded Moore Industries in 1968. Working from a friend's garage/shop, Moore designed and built the first Moore Industries SCT signal converter, which soon evolved into a product line of six signal interfaces. In 1974, the company built its current headquarters in North Hills, California, which employs hundreds of people today.

In 1996, he was elected an International Society of Automation (ISA) Fellow. The fellowship distinction recognized Moore's contributions to the advancement of signal conditioning instrumentation and monitoring systems, including radio frequency interference and electromagnetic interference protection. His contributions to these fields include Moore Industries' miniMOORE line of multichannel signal conditioners, which received an Engineer's Choice Award from Control Engineering in 2009. Under his leadership, Moore Industries applied for and was granted 19 patents relating to electronic instrument packaging, signal conditioning and instrumentation, and monitoring systems.

In 2009, Moore became an honorary member of the ISA, the highest honor bestowed by the society, for his "contributions in the advancement of the arts and sciences of automation over a 40-year career of innovation, product development, and business leadership at Moore Industries". He was also a State of California Registered Professional Engineer in Control Systems Engineering and had a State of California General and Electrical Contractors License.

The company remains in North Hills, Los Angeles. It has nine locations in North America, Asia, Europe, and Australia.

In addition to his professional developments and contributions to the automation industries, Moore was an avid fun-seeker. He was a professional racecar driver and received a pilot's license at 73.
