= Sam Dana =

American football player (1903–2007)

Sam Dana (born Samuel Salemi)
Profile
- Position: RB

Personal information
- Born: August 7, 1903; Brooklyn, New York, US
- Died: October 29, 2007 (aged 104); Buffalo, New York, US

Career information
- College: Columbia University

Career history
- 1926: Hartford Blues
- 1928: New York Yankees

Sam Dana (August 7, 1903 – October 29, 2007), born Samuel Salemi, was an American professional football player who was a running back for two seasons for the Hartford Blues and New York Yankees. At the time of his death, Dana was thought to be the oldest living NFL player. He is the 2nd-longest lived NFL player in history.

== Biography ==
Dana was known as Sam "Smoke" Salemi during his playing days. He became a football player at the suggestion of a teacher at New Utrecht High School in Brooklyn after seeing him weave through desks as a fellow student was chasing him. He attended Columbia University and was a football teammate of Lou Gehrig. Dana attended St John's University and Canisius College. After retiring from football, he became an agent for the Internal Revenue Service (IRS). He legally changed his last name to Dana in 1945.

Dana was mistaken for a baseball player who died in 1969, the mixup being published in the NFL's Total Football encyclopedia. He resurfaced in 2003 upon turning 100 when his son notified the Pro Football Hall of Fame that he was living in a nursing home in Kenmore, New York. He was a guest at the Hall of Fame's Senior Citizen Day later that year and was presented with a special jersey by the Buffalo Bills bearing 100 emblazoned on it upon visiting their training camp. Dana died at the age of 104 in 2007.

== See also ==
- List of centenarians (National Football League players)
