= Charles Makinson =

Australian cricketer

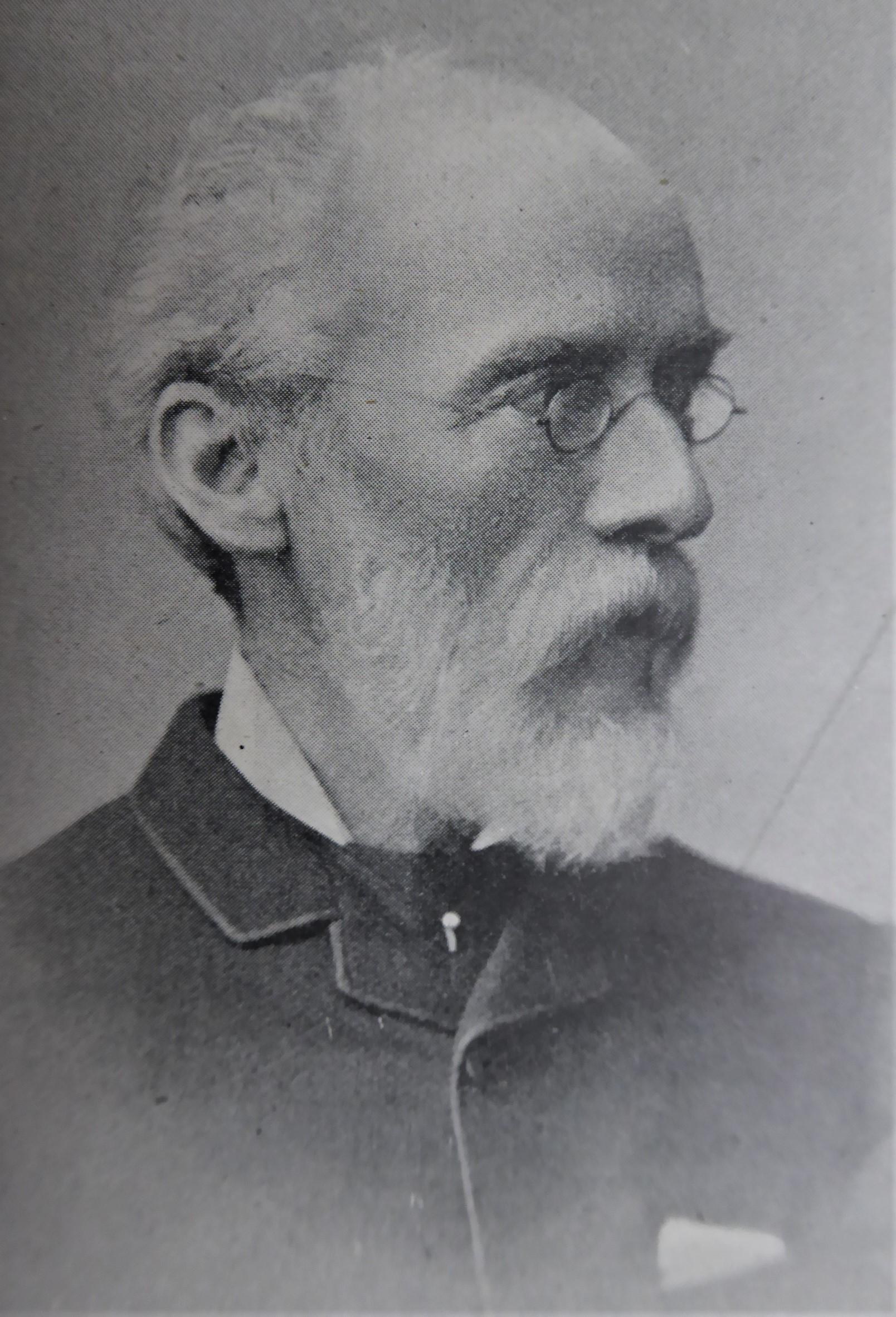

Personal information
- Born: 1831; Salford, Lancashire, England
- Died: 12 June 1895 (aged 63–64); Rugeley, Staffordshire, England

Domestic team information
- Years: Team
- 1861: Victoria
- Source: Cricinfo, 4 September 2020

Charles Makinson (1831 – 12 June 1895) was an Australian cricketer. He played two first-class cricket matches for Victoria in 1861.

== Early life and education ==
Charles Makinson was born in 1831 at Greenbank Way, Greengate, Salford. He was educated at Manchester Grammar School and Huddersfield College and then served his articles with his father, John Makinson, becoming a solicitor in 1857. He was a member of the Broughton Cricket Club and played for the first eleven.

== Career ==
He then moved to Australia and established a successful law practice in Castlemaine, Victoria. He was appointed Town Clerk and Borough Treasurer of Taradale, Victoria and Curator of Intestate Estates for the Castlemaine district. He was made a member of the Melbourne Cricket Club and played in the first eleven. In 1861 he captained the joint New South Wales and Victoria cricket team against an English eleven at the Melbourne Cricket Ground. He was also captain in a match at Castlemaine inflicting the English eleven's only defeat of their tour. Makinson stayed in Australia for seven years before returning to England in 1868 and resuming his law practice.

In 1872 he became a member of Salford Council for the Kersal ward and was made an Alderman in 1881. He served as Mayor of Salford for two terms from 1883 to 1885.

== See also ==
- List of Victoria first-class cricketers
