= Archie Richardson =

Australian rules footballer

Personal information
- Full name: Henry Archibald Richardson
- Born: 18 July 1879; Sale, Victoria
- Died: 7 March 1981 (aged 101); California, United States

Playing career^{1}
Years	Club	Games (Goals)
1902–1904	Richmond (VFA)	49 (2)
- ^{1} Playing statistics correct to the end of 1904.

Henry Archibald Richardson (18 July 1879 – 7 March 1981) was an Australian rules footballer who played with Richmond in the Victorian Football Association (VFA) from 1902 through 1904. He served in the Australian Army during World War I, later moving to the United States and serving in the United States Army during World War II. He died at the age of 101 in March 1981. For many years he was credited with playing for St Kilda in the VFL and was known as the longest-lived St Kilda player, however these games are now credited to other players.
