= Zach March =

English footballer

Personal information
- Full name: George Zillwood March
- Date of birth: 25 October 1892
- Place of birth: Bosham, England
- Date of death: 18 September 1994 (aged 101)
- Place of death: Bognor Regis, England
- Height: 5 ft 8 in (1.73 m)
- Position: Outside left

Senior career*
Years	Team	Apps	(Gls)
19??–1913	Bosham		
1913–1922	Brighton & Hove Albion	85	(6)
1922–1923	Portsmouth	4	(0)
1923–192?	Chichester City		
- * Club domestic league appearances and goals

George Zillwood March (25 October 1892 – 18 September 1994), commonly known as Zach March, was an English professional footballer who made 89 appearances in the Football League playing as an outside forward for Brighton & Hove Albion and Portsmouth.

== Life and career ==
March was born in Bosham, Sussex, in 1892. He played football for his hometown team before joining Southern League club Brighton & Hove Albion in 1913, initially on amateur terms. When Albion manager Jack Robson took over at Manchester United, March turned down the chance to accompany him, preferring to remain working in the family building firm. He scored 6 goals from 29 Southern League appearances either side of the First World War (during which he served in the Royal Sussex Regiment) and made 56 Football League appearances for Brighton after their admission to the newly formed Third Division in 1920. Two years later, he joined Portsmouth, but played little, and was released at the end of the season. He then captained Sussex County League club Chichester City to victory in the Sussex Senior Cup in 1926. After retiring from football, he returned to the building trade.

Interviewed by the Daily Express on his 100th birthday, by which time he was the oldest surviving former Football League player, March said he would have been a better player today than in the 1920s because of more flexible boots, a lighter ball, and the increased positional freedom allowed in the modern game. He died in a Bognor Regis care home in 1994, a month short of his 102nd birthday.
