= Charlie Macartney =

Australian cricketer

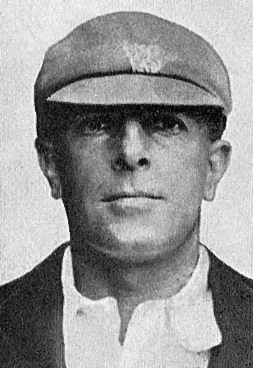

Personal information
- Full name: Charles George Macartney
- Born: 27 June 1886; Maitland, New South Wales, Australia
- Died: 9 September 1958 (aged 72); Little Bay, New South Wales, Australia
- Nickname: The Governor-General
- Height: 5 ft 3 in (1.60 m)
- Batting: Right-handed
- Bowling: Left-arm orthodox spin

International information
- National side: Australia
- Test debut (cap 90): 13 December 1907 v England
- Last Test: 14 August 1926 v England

Domestic team information
- Years: Team
- 1905/06–1926/27: New South Wales
- 1909/10: Otago

Career statistics
Competition	Test	First-class
Matches	35	249
Runs scored	2,131	15,019
Batting average	41.78	45.78
100s/50s	7/9	49/53
Top score	170	345
Balls bowled	3,561	25,021
Wickets	45	419
Bowling average	27.55	20.95
5 wickets in innings	2	17
10 wickets in match	1	1
Best bowling	7/58	7/58
Catches/stumpings	17/–	102/–
- Source: CricInfo, 24 October 2007

Charles George Macartney (27 June 1886 – 9 September 1958) was an Australian cricketer who played in 35 Test matches between 1907 and 1926. He was known as "The Governor-General" in reference to his authoritative batting style and his flamboyant strokeplay, which drew comparisons with his close friend and role model Victor Trumper, regarded as one of the most elegant batsmen in cricketing history. Sir Donald Bradman—generally regarded as the greatest batsman in history—cited Macartney's dynamic batting as an inspiration in his cricket career.

He started his career as a bowling all-rounder. He made his Test debut in 1907, primarily as a left arm orthodox spinner who was considered to be a useful lower-middle order right-hand batsman. As Macartney was initially selected for his flexibility, his position in the batting order was frequently shuffled and he was largely ineffective. His most noteworthy Test contribution in his early career was a match-winning ten wicket haul at Headingley in 1909, before being dropped in the 1910–11 Australian season. It was around this time that Macartney befriended Trumper and began to transform himself from a bowler who batted in a defensive and technically correct manner, into an audacious attacking batsman. He reclaimed his Test position and made his maiden Test century in the same season, before establishing himself as the leading batsman in the team.

The First World War stopped all first-class cricket and Macartney enlisted in the Australian Imperial Force. Upon the resumption of cricket, Macartney stamped himself as one of the leading batsmen in the world with his performances during the 1921 Ashes tour. Macartney produced an Australian record score in England of 345 against Nottinghamshire. The innings was the fastest triple century in first-class cricket and the highest score made by a batsman in a single day of play. He reached 300 in 205 minutes and the innings took less than four hours. Macartney topped the batting averages and run-scoring aggregates, which saw him named as one of the five Wisden Cricketers of the Year in 1922. Wisden said that he was, "by many degrees the most brilliant and individual Australian batsman of the present day". After missing the 1924–25 series due to mental illness or a recurrence of war injuries, Macartney departed international cricket at the peak of his powers on the 1926 tour of England. He became the second Australian to score a century in the first session of a Test match, and did so on a sticky wicket conducive to bowling. This was part of a sequence of three consecutive Test centuries as he led the batting charts. Macartney was posthumously inducted into the Australian Cricket Hall of Fame in 2007.

== Style ==
Macartney's flair was compared to that of Victor Trumper, and his determination to that of Don Bradman, who is generally regarded as the finest batsman in cricketing history. His style was quite different from that of Trumper, but he generated fascination with his Trumper-like daring and supreme confidence. Self-taught to a greater extent than anyone else in Australia or England in his era, the 1922 Wisden Almanack described Macartney as "a triumph to individualism... he is not a model to be copied" and "one of the most brilliant and attractive right-handed batsmen in the history of Australian cricket". His success was largely attributed to his eye, hand and foot co-ordination.

Macartney was a short man, standing 160 cm (5" 3). When batting, he would unconventionally attempt to leg glance yorkers pitched on middle stump down to fine-leg, and often lost his wicket in so doing. He was known for preferring his team-mates to give him candid criticism rather than praise. In later life he condemned modern batsmen; he would explain why he no longer watched cricket by saying "I can't bear watching luscious half-volleys being nudged gently back to bowlers". Sir Neville Cardus wrote that "there was always chivalry in his cricket, a prancing sort of heroism. The dauntlessness of his play, the brave beauty and the original skill bring tears to my eyes yet." In the late 1940s, Macartney received a letter from a compiler of Who's Who in Australia, seeking information on his life. Macartney said that he had "no record of figures, nor am I concerned with them. My only interest is the manner in which the runs are compiled and how wickets are taken, and in the good of the game." "Those sentiments", wrote former Australian Test batsman Jack Fingleton, "summed up the cricket story of C. G. Macartney".

An authoritative, combative stylist, Macartney's élan and devastating strokemaking led Kent cricketer Kenneth Hutchings to dub him "The Governor-General". Fingleton noted that, early in his innings, Macartney had a strategy of aiming a shot straight at the bowler's head, in order to rattle him and seize a psychological advantage. On one occasion, after reaching a century before lunch on the first day of a match, he immediately called for a bat change. He selected the heaviest bat from the batch that his team-mate brought out and stated "Now I'm going to have a hit". His rate of scoring and boundary-hitting subsequently increased. He possessed powerful hands, strong forearms and broad shoulders. Leg spinning Test team-mate Arthur Mailey recalled that Macartney would often hit him for six in Sydney Grade Cricket matches. Grinning, he would say "Pitch another one there and I'll hit you for a few more". On the occasions when he lost his wicket attempting further long hits, Macartney's grin remained, and he would remark "Wasn't it good fun?" The famed cricket writer RC Robertson-Glasgow said

No other Australian batsman, not even Bradman, has approached Macartney for insolence of attack. He made slaves of bowlers. His batting suggested a racket player who hits winners from any position. Length could not curb him, and his defence was lost and included in his attack.

As a bowler, Macartney delivered the ball at a relatively fast pace for a left-arm orthodox spinner, comparable in speed to Derek Underwood. He was known for his consistent length and his well-concealed faster ball which often caught batsmen off guard. On sticky wickets, he was often incisive, and these conditions helped him take five wickets in an innings 17 times in his first-class career. He was known for his miserly attitude, often giving the impression that he would rather bowl ten consecutive maidens rather than take wickets if it meant conceding runs. This extended to his off-field activities, where he was considered careful with money. On the 1926 tour of England, he and Mailey visited a hat shop that had a tradition of giving souvenir hats to cricketers of touring Australian squads. When asked if he would like a similar style to the one he received in 1921, Macartney referred to the hat on his head and replied "Not on your life. I've been wearing this since you gave it to me in 1921." Macartney's notorious fiscal obsessions irritated his captain Warwick Armstrong on the 1921 tour; during the trip, he would hoard all manner of goods that were given to the team as gifts.

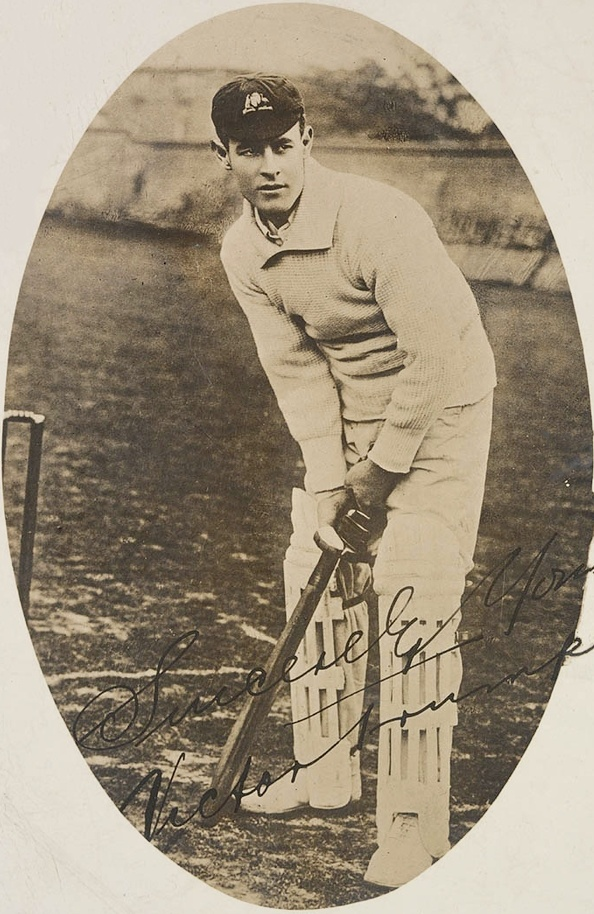
Victor Trumper, Macartney's friend and role model.

In 1909, Australian team-mate Trumper moved from Paddington, a suburb on Sydney's south shore to Chatswood on the northern side of the harbour, where Macartney lived. Macartney and Trumper played together for Gordon Cricket Club on the north shore and became close friends. Macartney regularly practised on the Trumper family's backyard turf pitch. Trumper's relocation made more frequent meetings possible, since the Sydney Harbour Bridge was not to open until 1932, and the only way of travelling between either side of the bay was by ferry. Trumper was regarded as the "crown prince of the golden age of cricket", the finest and most stylish batsman of his era, and one of the most elegant strokemakers of all time. Under Trumper's influence, Macartney became more audacious and adventurous; Unlike their English counterparts, the Australians were proud of their spontaneous play. Macartney revered Trumper as both a cricketer and a person, and was to be a pall bearer when Trumper died in 1915 at the age of 37. However, unlike Trumper, Macartney was known for his habit of "walking", the act of leaving the ground before or contrary to an umpire's decision if a batsman knows that he is out. On one occasion, Macartney felt so guilty that the umpire had incorrectly ruled him not out despite a clear edge that he attempted to throw his wicket away with a wild airborne shot. However, the ball went for six, and Trumper, his batting partner at the time, admonished him, saying that his good luck would be balanced by occasions when the umpire would give him out incorrectly.

== Early years ==
Macartney was born on 27 June 1886 in West Maitland, New South Wales, son of Joseph Belton Macartney, house-painter and later motor mechanic, and his wife Mary Anne, nee Moore. He was taught to play cricket as a child by his maternal grandfather George Moore, a slow roundarm bowler who represented New South Wales in three first-class matches against Victoria. The equipment consisted of small hand-crafted bat made from cedar, and apples from the family orchard used as balls.

In 1898, Macartney and his family moved from Maitland to Sydney. In his school cricketing career Macartney distinguished himself as an all-rounder at Woollahra Superior and Chatswood public schools, before briefly attending Fort Street High School. Macartney asserted that school cricket was insignificant in his development, believing that he learned more about cricket during informal summer cricket games with his brother at the local park, with their dog acting as a fielder. It was during his school career that Macartney was noticed by incumbent Australian captain Monty Noble, who heaped praise on him in a newspaper article.

After leaving school, Macartney worked for a fruit and vegetable merchant near Sydney's Sussex Street docks, honing his batting skills by practising without pads on a wooden wharf during his lunch break. At this stage in his career, he possessed a copybook technique and defensive style, something he was to discard for an audacious, self-styled and attacking outlook.

In 1902, Macartney joined North Sydney Cricket Club in the first division of Sydney Grade Cricket and then moved to the Gordon club in the outer northern suburbs when it was formed during the 1905–06 season. He played regularly for Gordon until 1933–34 when he was 47, amassing 7648 runs at an average of 54.62. He was known for his dominant status at the Chatswood Oval. In one match, he lofted a ball out of the ground, over the railway line and onto a lawn bowling green, forcing the players to take evasive action.

== First-class debut ==
Macartney's exploits were noticed by the State selectors, and he made his first class debut for New South Wales against Queensland at the start of the 1905–06 season. He made 56 in New South Wales' first innings of 691, and after not bowling in the first innings, he took 3/80 and his first catch in an innings victory. He then scored 70 not out in an innings triumph over South Australia. He failed to pass 25 in his remaining four matches for the season, but took at least one wicket in each game. In one match for his state against an Australian XI, Macartney took a total of 5/123, including the wickets of Trumper and Australian Test captains Noble and Joe Darling. He was also run out in both innings. Aside from this match, New South Wales were victorious in the remaining five fixtures. He scored 185 runs at 26.43 and took 15 wickets at 28.20 in six matches.

Macartney continued his rise with a more productive and consistent second season with both the ball and bat. In his second match in 1906–07, Macartney broke through for his first century, scoring 122 before taking match figures of 4/92 in an innings win over Queensland. In the next match, he took his first five-wicket innings haul, recording figures of 5/18 and 2/17 in an innings win over South Australia, including leading Test batsman Clem Hill twice. Macartney took wickets in each match; he ended the season with 405 runs at 40.50, with two further fifties, and took 30 wickets at 18.20 in nine matches.

The following season, in 1907–08, saw the arrival of England for a Test series. Macartney had a chance to stake his claim for national selection in a match for his state against the tourists. He made 9 and 13, unbeaten in both innings, as his partners were dismissed cheaply and left him stranded. New South Wales made 101 and 96 and lost by 408 runs, with Macartney taking a total of 1/64. He was selected for an Australian XI to play the tourists in an effective dress rehearsal for the Tests, and made 42 and took 4/36 in a drawn match. As a result, Macartney was selected to make his debut against England in the First Test at the Sydney Cricket Ground. He was viewed as a utility player, selected for the flexibility in his batting position and his left arm orthodox spin.

== Test debut ==
Macartney had a moderately successful debut. He bowled three wicketless overs in the first innings, before scoring 35 in Australia's reply while batting at No. 7. He took one wicket, that of leading English batsman Wilfred Rhodes. With Australia needing 274 runs to win in the second innings, Noble decided that Macartney's first innings effort warranted promotion to act as Trumper's opening partner. He managed to score only nine, but Australia managed to scrape home to seal a two wicket victory. Macartney's domestic form after his Test debut was sufficient for him to retain his position for the Second Test in Melbourne. Noble persevered with Macartney as Trumper's opening partner and he scored 37 of an 84 run opening partnership in the first innings. He returned to the middle order in the second innings to score 54 and took a total of 1/55 as England squared the series with a narrow one wicket victory. His most productive batting of the series came in the Third Test in Adelaide, when he scored 75 batting at No. 3 and took two wickets for 66 runs (2/66) in an Australian victory. His batting was largely ineffectual in the last two Tests; he failed to score more than 30 in any innings as he was moved to No. 8 and then back to the opening position in the Fifth Test. Despite his confused role as a batsman, he contributed with the ball in the Fifth Test victory on a pitch amenable to spin, taking match figures of 5/66. His first international series had yielded 273 runs at an average of 27.30 and ten wickets at an average of 26.60. He tasted victory, with Australia taking the series 4–0. His highest score of the season was 96 against England in a later match for New South Wales. The hosts were 12 runs short of victory with one wicket in hand when time ran out. Macartney scored 524 runs at 27.58 and took 25 wickets at 28.76 in 12 matches. In spite of his unsettled role in the batting line up, Macartney had performed well-enough as an all-rounder in the following domestic season in 1908–09 to be selected for the 1909 tour of England, his first overseas tour. Macartney took a total of 6/60 in an innings victory over South Australia in the first match of the season. He then scored 100 in the return match, and ended the six matches of the summer with 319 runs at 53.17 and nine wickets at 29.89.

== First tour of England ==
Macartney started his tour of England by taking match figures of 5/86 in a nine-wicket win over Northamptonshire. He took at least two wickets in each of the five matches leading up to the Tests, with 5/24 against Oxford University. He totalled 17 wickets at 15.18 and scored 141 runs at 28.20.

Macartney took 3/21 in the first innings of the First Test, removing captain Archie MacLaren, CB Fry and leading batsman Jack Hobbs, but managed only 0/35 in the second innings as England scored 0/105 to win by ten wickets. He then scored five and was wicketless as Australia levelled the series with a nine-wicket win in the Second Test. He then scored 124, his only century of the tour, in a non-first-class match against Western Union.

His bowling confounded the English team in the Third Test at Headingley in Leeds, where he took 7/58 in the first innings and 4/27 in the second. It was his best innings and match bowling figures in Tests and helped win the Test and eventually retain The Ashes. Australia had struggled to post 188 in their first innings on a pitch conducive to spin bowling, with Macartney scoring only four. Australia responded with a dual spin attack, with Noble bowling off spin in tandem with Macartney's left arm orthodox. Noble (0/22 from 13 overs) tied down the batsman, allowing Macartney to attack at batsman at the other end. He bowled with a high trajectory, tempting the batsmen to attack him and then varied his bowling speed to surprise them. He had Jack Sharp stumped after luring him from the crease and bowled Jack Hobbs with a faster ball. Other victims included English captain MacLaren, JT Tyldesley, George Hirst and Sydney Barnes. England were bowled out for 182 and Australia replied with 207; Macartney scored 18. Australia went on to win by 126 runs after Macartney took four more wickets in the second innings, removing MacLaren, Tyldesley, Rhodes and Barnes to help dismiss the hosts for 87. Macartney then made a half-century and took a wicket in each of the last two Tests, both of which were drawn to hand Australia a 2–1 series win.

Macartney's batting in the Test series was largely unsuccessful. He made two fifties, but otherwise failed to pass 20 and ended with 153 runs at 19.13. In his era, the expectation was that batsmen would be able to bat in a variety of positions and Macartney was gradually moved from seventh down to tenth in the batting order by the end of the tour. Largely due to his efforts at Headingley, his bowling figures were more impressive; he ended the Tests with 16 wickets at 16.13. At this stage of his career, Macartney was regarded as a bowling all-rounder. He was only eighth on the batting averages for the tour, with 503 first-class runs at 16.77, but took 71 wickets at an average of 17.46 in eight matches.

Upon returning to the southern hemisphere, Macartney headed to New Zealand for a stint with Otago instead of playing in Australia in 1909–10, due to attractiveness of the foreign outfit's remuneration. The period was unsuccessful for Otago—all three matches were lost—but Macartney was prolific as an individual. He took match figures of 7/68 against Canterbury and 7/81 in the first innings of a game against Australia, removing Test teammates Warwick Armstrong and Warren Bardsley. He ended with 17 wickets at 17.53 and scored 132 runs at 22.00.

Macartney started poorly in the home series against the touring South Africans in the Test series of 1910–11. In the first three Tests, he accumulated 15 runs in five innings and took a solitary wicket. As a result, he was dropped for the Fourth Test. Up to this point he had not passed 45 in 13 innings for the season and taken only seven wickets in seven matches. He then made 119 and 126 for New South Wales against South Africa and took match figures of 4/155 as the tourists fell to a 44-run defeat. This prompted the selectors to restore him to the Test team, and Macartney bounced back with his first Test century, making 137 in the first innings and 56 in the second in just 40 minutes, as Australia completed a seven-wicket win. It was his third century in as many first class innings. The late-season hat-trick of centuries pushed Macartney's season total to 609 runs at 33.83 and 10 wickets at 54.90 in ten matches.

The 1911–12 season started strongly for Macartney. He scored 122 and took 5/81 as New South Wales defeated Queensland by an innings. However, the season went downhill from there; Macartney failed to pass 30 in the next ten innings and took only three wickets in the next six matches. As a result, he was left out of the playing XI and made twelfth man for the first three Tests against the touring England team.

== Omission and recall in 1912 ==
Macartney's omission was part of the most infamous disputes in Australian cricket history and led to a fracas. Australian captain and selector Clem Hill wanted to include Macartney for the Third Test, but another member of the panel, former player Peter McAlister objected and said that Hill should omit himself if he wanted Macartney to play. Tensions between the two selectors were high, and came to a head in a selection meeting ahead of the Fourth Test. McAlister criticised Hill's tactics and policies towards his bowlers, provoking an exchange of insults regarding the other's leadership ability. Hill then bloodied McAlister with a powerful blow to the nose and the ensuing brawl lasted between 10 and 20 minutes. Furniture was knocked across the room, artwork shattered and Hill had to be restrained from throwing McAlister out of the third floor window, before resigning as a selector.

Eventually, Macartney was recalled for the Fifth Test against England and scored 26 and 27 and took a total of 1/54 in a defeat. Macartney scored 300 runs at 27.27 and took nine wickets at 32.78 in eight first-class matches for the season. Macartney wrote later that "persistent ill-feeling seriously affected the morale of the side".

Macartney then toured England for the 1912 Triangular Test Tournament, which also included South Africa. He was not in the original touring party, but six senior players including Hill and vice-captain Warwick Armstrong and leading batsman Victor Trumper withdrew from the tour due to a dispute with the board. Macartney was thus given a late call-up.

Macartney scored 84 but the tourists started on a bad note, losing to Nottinghamshire. He then scored 127 against Northamptonshire, 208 against Essex, 123 and 25 not out against Surrey and 74 against the Marylebone Cricket Club in four consecutive matches. Australia won the first two by an innings and the latter two by seven and five wickets respectively. Up to this point, Macartney had only claimed a solitary wicket. He then took match figures of 6/60 in a ten-wicket win over Oxford University.

Australia then defeated South Africa in their first Test of the tournament. Macartney made 21 in an innings victory and did not bowl. Macartney's batting waned in the next seven tour matches, passing 50 only three times in ten innings. However, he did take 13 wickets, including 6/54 against Yorkshire. Macartney then scored 99 in a drawn Test against England at Lord's that did not reach the second innings. Wisden regarded the innings as his best for the season. Macartney added half-centuries in consecutive county matches and after three further matches without passing 21, the Tests resumed.

Macartney scored nine and took 3/29 in a ten-wicket win over South Africa, and then scored 142 and 121 in the next match against Sussex. The next Test against England was then washed out in the first innings; Macartney neither batted nor bowled. The following match against South Africa did not reach the second innings and Australia then lost to England by 244 runs in the final, with Macartney taking a total of 2/67 and scoring four and 30. It was a barren August for Macartney, who did not pass 35 and took only six wickets in six first-class matches. However, he finished the tour strongly, scoring 176 against the South of England and 71 against CB Fry's XI in the last two matches.

Macartney scored 2,207 runs during the tour at an average of 45.04. During the English season, he reached the peak of his performance as an all-rounder, taking 38 wickets. He made six centuries, including two in one match against Sussex. Apart from his 99 at Lord's, Macartney did not pass 34 in the other Tests and ended with 197 runs at 32.83. He did not bowl heavily during the series, taking six wickets at 23.66. It was not a happy tour for the Australians; without the senior players, there were frequent reports of drunken brawls and verbal abuse towards the locals. Macartney was one of only four players to accept the guaranteed tour fee of 400 pounds; the others signed up to a percentage share of the profits and the commercial failure of the tour left them with less than half of the flat fee.

There were no further Test matches before the First World War. The 1912–13 Australian season was a short one for Macartney, but he was in rare form, scoring 125, 96, 94, 76 not out, 91, 10 and 154 in four matches, to total 646 runs at 107.66. He also took four wickets at 30.50.

During an unofficial tour of the Australian team to the United States and Canada during the off season in 1913, which consisted of more than 50 matches, the overwhelming majority of which were not first-class, Macartney scored 2,390 runs at 45.92 and took 189 wickets at 3.81, topping both the batting and bowling averages. He also made the most centuries (seven) and the highest individual score of 186 against a combined Canada and United States team. Macartney played in only five first-class matches and scored two centuries in these fixtures. In two non-first-class matches, he took 11/23 and 10/29 in an innings.

The 1913–14 domestic season was to be the last season of cricket before the outbreak of World War I. Macartney captained New South Wales for the first time against Tasmania. He had another prolific season with the bat; in six matches he scored 892 runs at 111.50 in nine innings. He scored 201 in an innings victory over Victoria, four other centuries including a 195, and two fifties. With Macartney in such form, five of the matches were won by an innings, and another by nine wickets. The record was blotted only by a loss to South Australia by 19 runs. Macartney took two wickets at 32.50. Macartney was selected for the five-Test tour of South Africa in 1914–15, but the campaign was called off due to the war.

Despite his success on the field, Macartney still had a regular job outside of cricket, as with most cricketers of the era. In 1914, he left his job on the Sydney wharves and joined the staff of New South Wales Railways & Tramways in the Chief Mechanical Engineer's Office at Redfern. The following season, he scored 191 runs at 38.20 including a century in three matches. He did not take a wicket.

== Post-war Test career ==
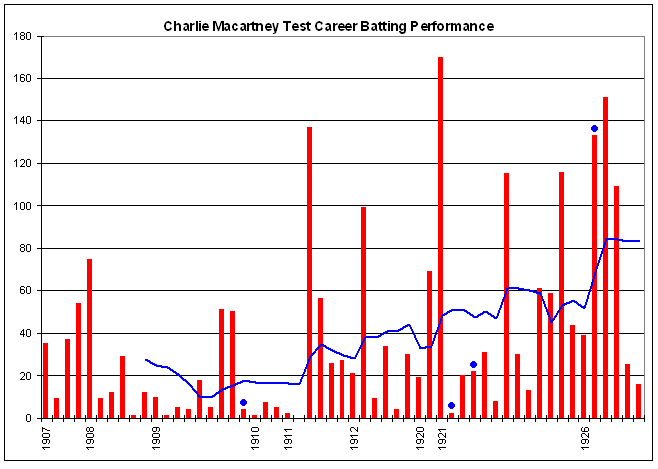
Macartney's Test career batting performance, showing the marked improvement post World War I. The red bars indicate an individual innings, while the blue lines indicate the batting average in the ten most recent innings. The blue dots indicate innings in which he remained not out.

World War I interrupted Macartney's career as competitive cricket was cancelled. In January 1916, he enlisted in the Australian Imperial Force (AIF). In July 1917 he was posted to France as a temporary Warrant Officer in the 3rd Division Artillery. In 1918, he was awarded the Meritorious Service Medal for gallantry and reached the rank of corporal. The death of his father later in the year led to his repatriation from Britain and prevented his appearance with the AIF cricket team.

The war years divided Macartney's career in two. Prior to the war, he was primarily known as a bowling all-rounder. In 21 Tests, he had taken 34 wickets at 26 and scored 879 runs at 27, with one century. After the war, Macartney transformed himself into one of the greatest batsmen of his era. In his 14 post-war Tests, he scored 1,252 runs at nearly 70, with six centuries. His bowling became more sporadic, taking just 11 more wickets, averaging 32.

Macartney resumed Test cricket when Australia hosted England in 1920–21, and was one of only four players remaining from before the war. However, he only played in two of the Tests due to illness and injury. His early season form was ominous for the tourists. Macartney scored 161 in guiding New South Wales to a successful run-chase of 4/335 over the Englishmen. He then scored 96 and 30 for an Australian XI against the tourists in a dress rehearsal for the Tests.

In the First Test, playing as an opening batsman, he struck 19 in the first innings. Australia's new post-war skipper Warwick Armstrong felt that Macartney would be more effective at number three, and in the second innings, he made a free-flowing 69 in a 111-run second-wicket stand with Herbie Collins as Australia went on to inflict a 377-run defeat. Macartney's return to form was interrupted by an illness, which caused him to miss the following three Test matches. After a two-month layoff, Macartney struck 130 in a match for his state against England.

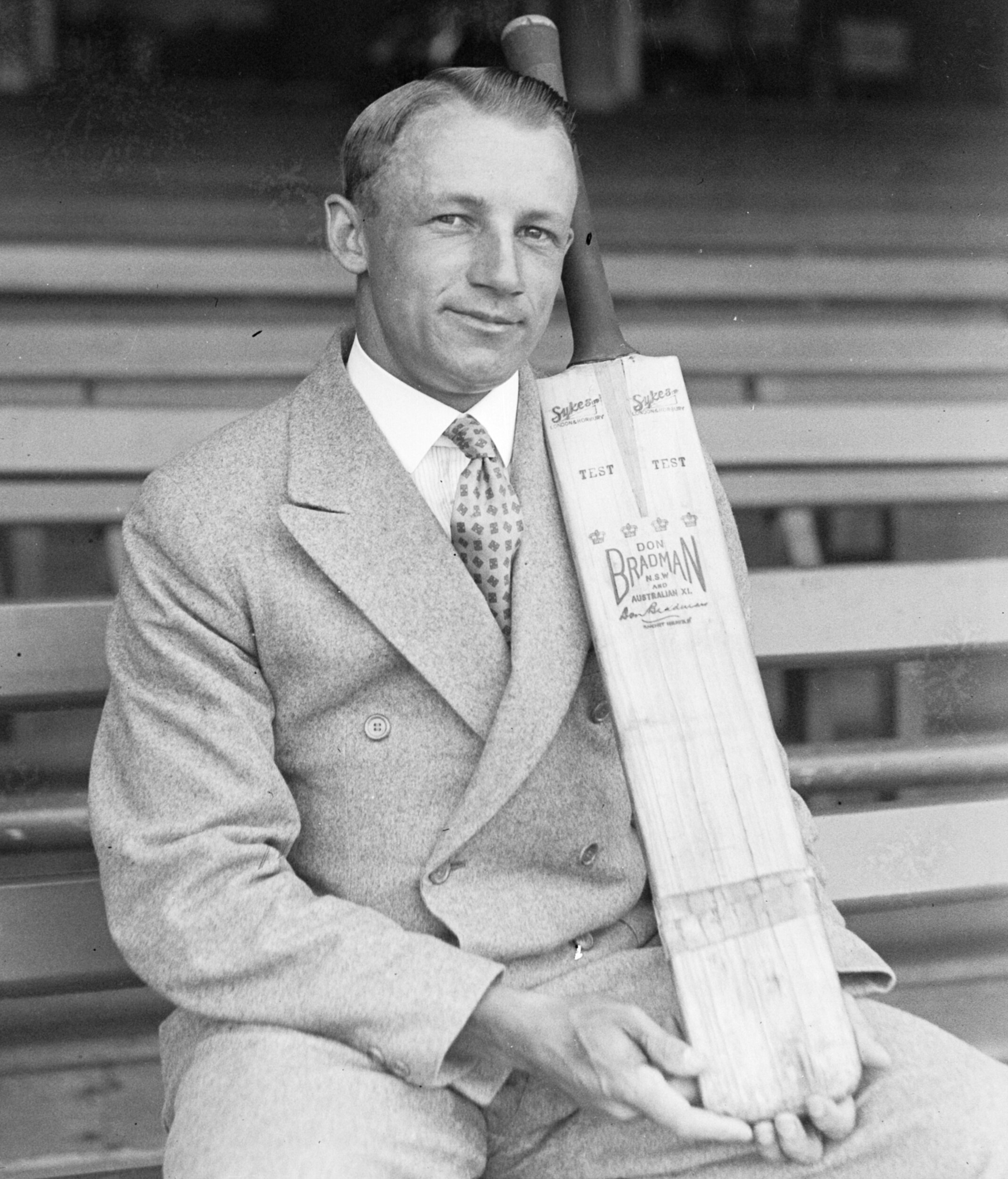
Don Bradman, regarded as the greatest batsman in cricket history, cited Macartney as an inspiration.

He returned for the Fifth and final Test, where he recorded his highest Test innings of 170 on his home ground, the Sydney Cricket Ground. Among the spectators was a 12-year-old Don Bradman, who had been taken to watch Macartney by his father. Eight decades later, Bradman recalled the innings, "as if it were yesterday", describing it as full of "delicate leg-glances, powerful pulls, cuts and glorious drives" and concluding that it was one of the best innings he had seen in his lifetime. Bradman cited the innings as an inspiration for his career. Macartney headed the Australian Test averages with 260 runs at 86.66 as Australia won the Ashes 5–0. It was the only such Ashes whitewash until 2006–07. Macartney has amassed 821 runs at 68.42 for the season. He took only three wickets at 56.33.

== Wisden Cricketer of the Year ==
On the 1921 Ashes tour, Macartney—who needed a special medical clearance before being selected— had a chance to rectify his poor batting performances of his pre-war tours of England. In his first match, against Leicestershire, he started strongly with 177. his fast scoring helped Australia complete an innings victory in just over half the allotted playing time. He scored 87 against Surrey, 51 against Combined Services and 77 against Oxford University in the next seven matches leading up to the start of the Tests, with a total of 539 runs at 53.90 under his belt.

Macartney made 20 in the first innings and was unbeaten on 22, playing as an opener, as Australia completed a ten-wicket win in the First Test. It was Australia's sixth consecutive Test win over England. He failed to pass 20 in the next two county matches, but did take 2/19 against Middlesex, his first wickets on tour. This came in his 11th match on tour and was a reflection of his role as a specialist batsman in the post-war years. The next game against Gloucestershire heralded the start of a rich vein of run-scoring during the remainder of June. Macartney scored 149, in an Australian innings noted for elegant strokeplay and big hitting, after managing only 31 and eight in the eight-wicket win in the Second Test, hit three consecutive centuries.

Macartney hit 105 as Australia amassed 7/708 declared against Hampshire and then made 193 as Australia compiled 621 and defeated Northamptonshire by an innings and 484 runs. The two matches were separated by a match against Surrey, which Macartney missed due to injury. In the latter match, Macartney came in at first drop after the hosts took a wicket from the first ball of the match, and he scored 193 of the 318 runs scored while he was in the middle. Macartney took only 135 minutes and hit 31 fours as Australia added more than 300 in just over two hours of batting. Such was the dominance of Macartney and the rest of Armstrong's men that they disposed of Northamptonshire in less than two days. However, his most famed innings was yet to come.

In the next match, Macartney scored 345 against Nottinghamshire at Trent Bridge in 232 minutes, with 47 fours and four sixes. Macartney had an inauspicious start to the day, coming to the crease after the dismissal of Warren Bardsley with only one run scored. He attacked immediately and was dropped in the slips when on nine runs. The missed chance further emboldened Macartney, who had a philosophy that being dropped was a signal that it was his day to shine. He proceeded to exhibit his full repertoire of strokes. After reaching his double century in only 150 minutes, Macartney signalled to the pavilion. When Nottinghamshire captain Arthur Carr asked him if he was seeking a drink, Macartney said that he wanted a heavier bat and indicated that he was going to attack. Macartney kept his promise, adding his next 100 runs in only 48 minutes to reach 300 in 198 minutes. At the time, it was the fastest triple century in first-class cricket in terms of minutes. It still stands as the highest innings by an Australian in England, and at the time was the most runs scored by any batsman in one day. During the innings, Macartney partnered Nip Pellew in a partnership of 291. Australia went on to score 675 and won by an innings and 517 runs, in only two days, the largest winning margin achieved by Australia in a first-class match. The cricket writer Sumner Reid described Macartney's innings as:

the most destructive innings I ever saw in England or Australia. Not Trumper at his brilliant best, nor even Bradman in his calculated genius, ever performed with more unadulterated, murderous power and masterful technique.

In the space of four days, Macartney had scored 538 runs, and for the month of June, he had totalled 913 runs at 91.30. He carried this form into the next Test.

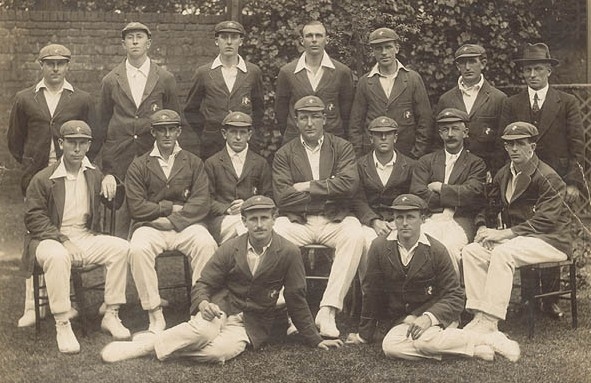
The successful 1921 Australian team. Macartney is third from the right in the middle row

In the Third Test at Headingley, he made his first Test century on foreign soil, striking 115 in the first innings. It was a relatively sedate innings for his standards, but helped Australia to victory by 191 runs and an unassailable 3–0 series lead. It gave Warwick Armstrong's men an eighth consecutive Test win, which remained a world record for more than five decades until surpassed by the West Indies cricket team of the 1980s. The cricket writer Gideon Haigh said that "It was like watching the armies of succeeding generations in combat, artillery, and tank against sword and horse".

Macartney had a quiet time over the next month, passing fifty only once in the next eight innings in seven matches. He also ended his wicket-taking drought, claiming six in three matches after almost two months without success. He returned to form with 72 against Warwickshire and 155 in the next match against Kent.

Macartney finished with 61 in the drawn Fifth Test at The Oval, to head the run-scoring with 300 runs at 42.85 as Australia took the series 3–0. He did not take a wicket in the Tests. Macartney then scored 121 against Gloucestershire in an innings victory immediately after the Tests, but did not pass 45 in the remaining four matches of the tour. Macartney topped the batting aggregates and averages with 2,317 runs at 59.41 in the first-class matches. He took only eight wickets at 32.63 for the entire tour.

Macartney's efforts during the 1921 English summer led to his being named as one of the 1922 Wisden Cricketers of the Year. Wisden stated that Macartney was "by many degrees the most brilliant and individual Australian batsman of the present day".

On the journey back to the southern hemisphere, Australia stopped for its first ever Test tour of South Africa. Macartney warmed up with 135 in a victory over Natal. The cricket writer Jack Pollard described Macartney's hitting as "powerful, almost arrogant". Macartney then scored 59 and 116 in an aggressive display in the First Test in Durban, which was drawn, with the hosts hanging on with only three wickets in hand. After missing the Second Test due to fitness reasons, Macartney returned against Western Province. He took 5/40 in the first innings, his first five-wicket innings since June 1912, nine and a half years earlier.

In the Third Test in Cape Town, Macartney scored 44, before taking 5/44 in the second innings to ensure that Australia would only have to chase a solitary run. He bowled three of his victims and removed Billy Zulch twice. The hosts struggled against the dual spin of Macartney and Mailey. Australians went on to secure a ten-wicket victory. Macartney finished the Test series with seven wickets at 14.86. He totalled 492 runs at 70.28 and 14 wickets at 17.14 for the tour, against topping the batting averages.

Macartney started the 1922–23 season strongly, scoring 63 and 84 and taking 2/8 in a five-wicket win over the touring MCC in the first match of the summer. He only passed fifty once more in the season and took 5/8 in an innings against Victoria. Macartney totalled 350 runs at 29.16 and 12 wickets at 12.16 in eight matches for the season. The next Australian season was a shortened one for New South Wales. Macartney scored 174 runs at 21.75 and took seven wickets at 21.14 in four matches before his state embarked on a tour of New Zealand.

Macartney struck form immediately, scoring 80 and 120 in the opening match against Wellington. He followed this with 100 (in a non-first-class match), 120 against Otago and 221 in the next match against Canterbury, all in consecutive innings. He added match figures of 4/38 as New South Wales defeated Canterbury by an innings. Macartney then scored 36 and 55 not out and took match figures of 4/55 in an eight-wicket win over New Zealand. He made only two and seven in the remaining first-class matches, and ended with 13 wickets at 20.92.

Macartney missed the 1924–25 Test series when England toured Australia. He played in only two first-class matches in the early stages of the season, scoring 11 runs at 3.66 and taking five wickets at 23.40. The withdrawal of Macartney from competition was attributed to a flare-up of an injury he had suffered during World War I, but sceptics believed that he had suffered a nervous breakdown.

Following his year off, Macartney returned to full-time cricket in 1925–26. He re-established himself in his first match, scoring 114 and taking a total of 4/49 as New South Wales crushed Western Australia by an innings and 235 runs. Macartney then scored 84 and 28 to help the Rest of Australia defeat the national team by 156 runs. He then scored two centuries as New South Wales won all four of their Sheffield Shield matches, three by an innings. Up to this point, Macartney had scored 582 runs at 72.75 and taken 20 wickets at 20.30. This was enough for him to be selected for the 1926 tour of England. His most notable performance with the ball was his 7/85 and 2/16 in an innings victory over arch-rivals Victoria. His wickets included batsmen Bill Woodfull (twice), Bill Ponsford, Jack Ryder and all rounder Hunter Hendry, who played alongside him in the 1926 Tests. Following his selection for the England tour, Macartney warmed up by scoring 66 and 163 not out and taking a total of 4/48 in consecutive innings victories for the Australian touring party over Tasmania.

== International farewell ==
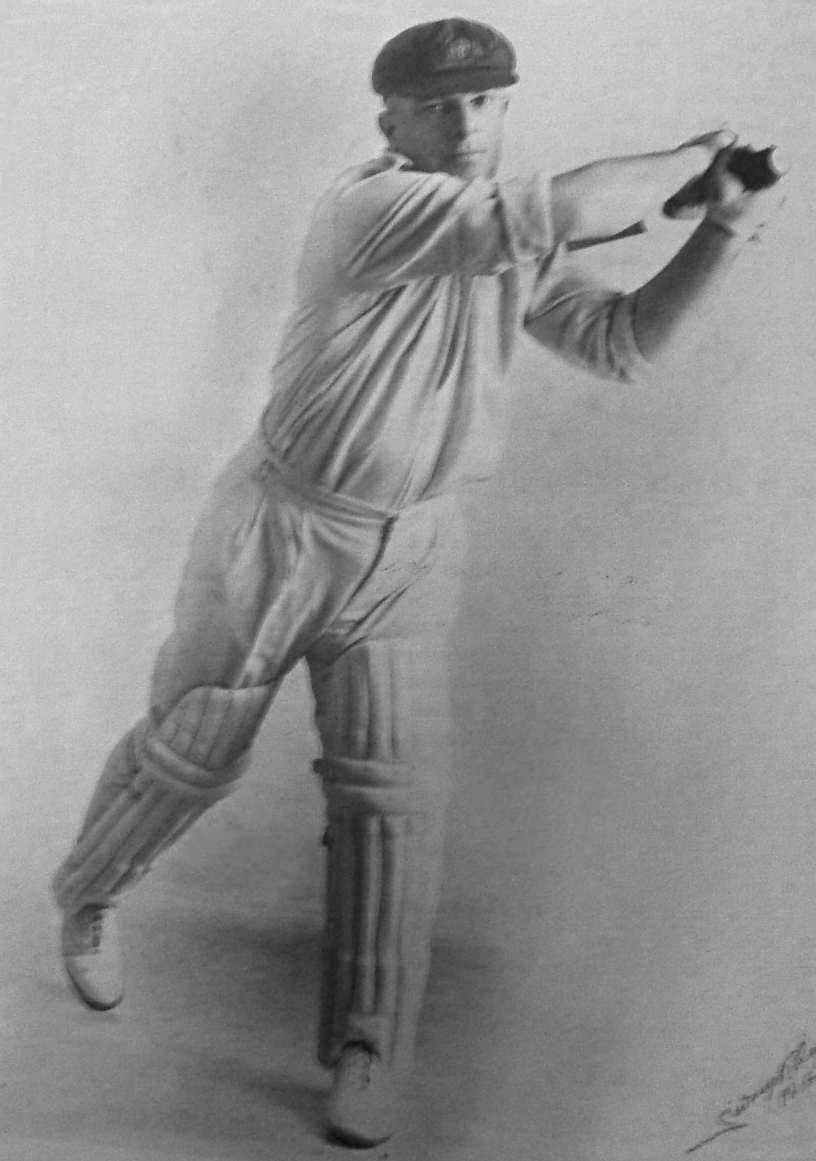
Charlie Macartney, "The Governor-General"

Macartney's international farewell on the 1926 tour of England saw him at the peak of his batting powers. Unlike the previous tour in 1921, Macartney was also prominent with the ball.

During the opening first-class fixture against Leicestershire, Macartney scored only two but took 5/9 in a rain-affected draw. In the next match against Essex, another rain-affected draw, he starred with the bat, scoring 148. In the third match, another draw against Surrey, Macartney combined both of his skills and scored 53 and took 6/63 in the first innings. His victims included English Test batsmen Jack Hobbs and Percy Fender. He then took 3/21 and 4/57 as Australia beat Hampshire to record their first win of the season. In nine matches before the First Test, Macartney scored 379 runs at 42.11 and took 30 wickets at 13.20.

The First Test at Trent Bridge was washed out, with England scoring 0/32 in the only innings of the match. Macartney then scored 54 as Australia made 6/148 in the only innings of another wet match against Yorkshire. He then hit form ahead of the Second Test, scoring 160 and taking a total of 5/34 in an innings win over Lancashire.

After scoring 39 in the first innings in the Second Test at Lord's, Macartney took 1/90, removing centurion Jack Hobbs as England took a 92-run first innings lead. He then scored 133 not out in the second innings, to help to stave off defeat. Australia were 5/194 when the match ended, and were it not for Macartney's effort could have been bowled out.

Between Tests, Macartney scored 42 and 81 against Northamptonshire and Nottinghamshire respectively before taking 5/38 against Worcestershire. Australia won all three matches.

In the Third Test at Headingley, Macartney became only the second batsman to score a century before lunch on the opening day of a Test. The match started poorly for Australia. English captain Arthur Carr won the toss and sent Australia in to bat after a thunderstorm on the previous day had turned the surface into a sticky wicket; Bardsley was then dismissed by the first ball for a golden duck. Macartney strode to the crease, surveyed the fielding positions and called down the wicket to the bowler Maurice Tate "Let's have it!" He nearly regretted his comment when he edged the ball to Carr at third slip from the fifth ball of the day. It was a difficult chance but the English skipper failed to hold the ball. Macartney was then on two. Within a few minutes, he had regained the initiative for the Australians.

Utilising both conventional technique and audacious shots, Macartney pierced the field with a variety of cuts, hooks, pulls, drives and glances. He teased the fielders with deliberate deflections through the slips; his late cuts were described by Raymond Robertson-Glasgow as being "so late they are almost posthumous". Macartney's attack helped his partner Bill Woodfull to settle in the difficult conditions. Macartney saved his severest hitting for George Macaulay, a medium pace swing bowler and off spinner whom he regarded as England's most potent bowler. Macartney had asked for and received permission from captain Herbie Collins to target Macaulay's bowling. By the end of the Australian innings, Macaulay had figures of 1/123 and was never to play against Australia again. Macartney's confidence was such that he charged down the pitch to meet the medium pace bowlers, a dangerous tactic on a surface with erratic bounce.

He reached 40 in as many minutes as Australia's total reached 50. Australia reached 100 in only 79 minutes with Macartney contributing 83 of those runs. Macartney reached his century in 103 minutes with the tourists on 131. By lunch, he had scored 112 in 116 minutes and he continued until the score reached 1/235, when he hit Macaulay to Patsy Hendren and was dismissed, having amassed 151 in 170 minutes. Former English captain Sir Pelham Warner said "I say without hesitation that I have never seen a greater innings... not even the immortal Victor Trumper could have played more finely". Macartney's innings allowed Australia to accumulate a healthy first innings total of 494. He then took 2/51, removing Carr and Fender as England made 294 and were forced to follow on; however, the Australians could not dismiss the hosts for a second time and the match ended in a draw.

Macartney then made 106 in a non-first-class match against the West of Scotland, before hitting 109 in the Fourth Test at Old Trafford in a rain-affected draw; the match failed to reach the second innings. Macartney had scored three centuries in as many innings.

Macartney's form tailed off thereafter; in the following six weeks, he made only one score beyond 40 in 11 innings and took only three wickets in nine matches. This included the Fifth Test, when he scored 25 and 16 and failed to take a wicket as England won the Test by 289 runs and with it the Ashes. Macartney topped the batting averages with 473 runs at 94.60 and took four wickets at 53.75. Macartney returned to form in the final first-class fixture of the season with an unbeaten 100 against and England XI.

Macartney decided to retire from Tests after the tour. He had taken part in twelve Test century partnerships, the highest being 235 with Woodfull in the Leeds Test.

== Career end ==
After his return to Australia, Macartney continued to play club cricket and turned out for a final first-class summer. At the start of the 1926–27 season, he captained a combined Sydney City team against a New South Wales country team, which included the then 18-year-old Bradman. Macartney scored 126 and Bradman 98 in a match viewed as a generational transition in Australian batting. He scored 114 in his opening first-class match of the season, and took wickets in each of his four matches. Macartney totalled 243 runs at 40.50 and took 11 wickets at 17.82.

In mid-1927 he toured Singapore and Malaya with Bert Oldfield's team and played in a series of non-first-class matches against local teams. In October 1929, he played for a New South Wales Cricket Association team against a series of local teams in the state's rural west.

In 1935–36, Macartney was vice-captain to Jack Ryder, on the tour of India organised by Frank Tarrant; he also wrote forthright columns for The Hindu, covering the trip. At the time, India had only received its first official tour, by England, and Australia was not keen on sending a Test team there. Thus, while the Test team were in South Africa, Tarrant's party consisted mainly of retired Test cricketers in their mid-40s and beyond.

In his return to first-class cricket after nine years, Macartney took 5/17 and 3/42 in the first international match against India, which the Australians won by eight wickets. He went wicketless as the series was squared in the second match, before taking 3/52 and 6/41 in the final match. Despite his nine wickets, Australia lost by 34 runs. Other notable performances included an 85 against Bengal and 3/45 and 3/47 against Madras. In the latter match, Macartney added 39 as the Australians scraped home by one wicket.

== Outside cricket ==
Macartney married Anna Bruce, a schoolteacher, at Chatswood Presbyterian Church in December 1921. At the time, the NSW Railway & Tramway Magazine noted that he was a "strict teetotaller and non-gambler" who loved his pipe, tennis and music. After his marriage, Macartney described himself as a civil servant while he was not engaged in cricketing activities. Like most Australian cricketers of his era, Macartney was Protestant, and a freemason.

Macartney wrote for several Sydney newspapers, and between 1936 and 1942 regularly produced pieces for the Sydney Morning Herald. In 1930 he published the autobiographical My Cricketing Days. During the Second World War, he was a lieutenant in the amenities service of the Australian Defence Force, and afterwards was a personnel officer at Prince Henry Hospital.

Childless, Macartney was predeceased by his wife. He died of coronary occlusion (heart attack) while at work in Little Bay, New South Wales, aged 72. He was cremated. In February 2007, Macartney was inducted into the Australian Cricket Hall of Fame along with Richie Benaud, making them the 26th and 27th inductees.

== Test match performance ==
		Batting				Bowling			
Opposition	Matches	Runs	Average	High Score	100 / 50	Runs	Wickets	Average	Best (Inns)
England	26	1,640	43.15	170	5/7	908	33	27.51	7/58
South Africa	9	491	37.76	137	2/2	332	12	27.66	5/44
Overall	35	2,131	41.78	170	7/9	1,240	45	27.55	7/58
