= Frank Cummins (cricketer) =

Australian cricketer

Personal information
- Born: 8 August 1906; Maitland, New South Wales, Australia
- Died: 27 April 1966 (aged 59); Lane Cove, New South Wales, Australia
- Source: ESPNcricinfo, 25 December 2016

Frank Cummins (8 August 1906 – 27 April 1966) was an Australian cricketer. He played eleven first-class matches for New South Wales between 1925/26 and 1932/33.
