= Leon Moore =

Australian cricketer

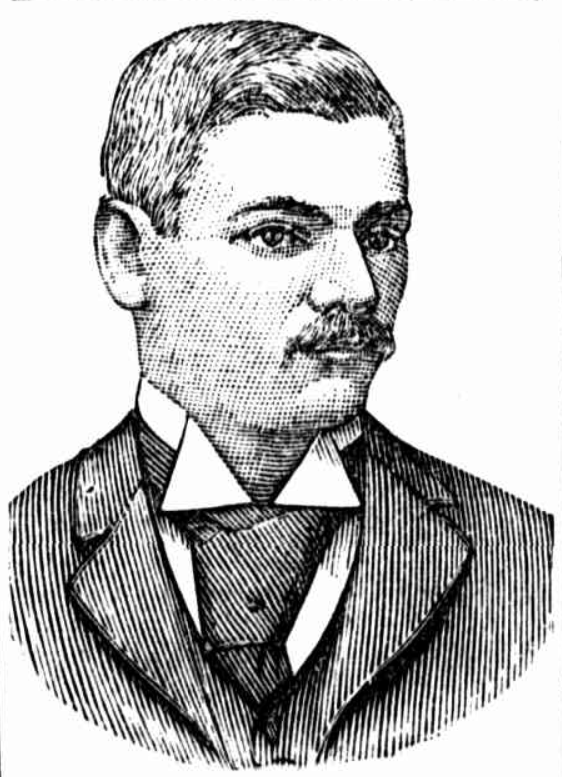

Personal information
- Full name: Leonard David Moore
- Born: 8 February 1871; Maitland, New South Wales, Australia
- Died: 11 September 1934 (aged 63); Maitland, New South Wales, Australia
- Source: Cricinfo, 9 January 2017

Leon Moore (8 February 1871 – 11 September 1934) was an Australian cricketer. He played eleven first-class matches for New South Wales from 1892/93 till 1894/95.

Moore was a son of Jemmy Moore who represented New South Wales at State level in cricket. He began his cricket career playing for the Pearl Club in Maitland and he topped the clubs batting average for four consecutive seasons and in the 1892/93 club season he came to prominence by averaging 70.4 with the bat with a top score of 149 not out and taking 24 wickets at an average of 10.54. He played his first First-class match that season in which he scored fourteen in two hours, stonewalling at the instruction of Alec Bannerman. He toured New Zealand with a NSW team in 1893/94 and later toured Queensland with a private team during which he scored 432 runs. When district cricket was established in NSW the Pearls cricket club was disbanded and Moore began playing for East End in district cricket. NSW cricket reverted to a club system at some point and he played for Standards and then Robins.

Moore's New South Wales State career ended in 1895 when he moved to Fremantle, Western Australia, and a benefit cricket match was played for him with an accompanying concert in Maitland as a farewell. He returned to Maitland after a short time, and renewed his association with the Robins cricket club, and lived in the town for the rest of his life. He died after a ten-day illness in 1934.

== See also ==
- List of New South Wales representative cricketers
