= List of oldest cricketers =

This is a set of lists of the oldest Test and first-class cricketers.

== Oldest living Test cricketers ==
Name	Country	Date of birth	Debut	Last match	Age as of 20 November 2026
Neil Harvey	Australia	8 October 1928	22 January 1948	20 February 1963	98 years, 43 days
Ian Leggat	New Zealand	7 June 1930	1 January 1954	5 January 1954	96 years, 166 days
Chandrakant Patankar	India	24 November 1930	28 December 1955	2 January 1956	95 years, 361 days
Gavin Stevens	Australia	29 February 1932	21 November 1959	6 February 1960	94 years, 265 days
Micky Stewart	England	16 September 1932	21 June 1962	26 January 1964	94 years, 65 days
Cammie Smith	West Indies	29 July 1933	9 December 1960	20 February 1962	93 years, 114 days
Tom Dewdney	West Indies	23 October 1933	14 May 1955	19 March 1958	93 years, 28 days
Jackie Hendriks	West Indies	21 December 1933	16 February 1962	17 June 1969	92 years, 334 days
Nari Contractor	India	7 March 1934	2 December 1955	7 March 1962	92 years, 258 days
Willie Rodriguez	West Indies	25 June 1934	7 March 1962	19 March 1968	92 years, 148 days

== Oldest living Test cricketers by country ==
Country	Player	Age as of 20 November 2026
Afghanistan	Mohammad Nabi	41 years, 323 days
Australia	Neil Harvey	98 years, 43 days
Bangladesh	Enamul Haque	60 years, 266 days
England	Micky Stewart	94 years, 65 days
India	Chandrakant Patankar	95 years, 361 days
Ireland	Ed Joyce	48 years, 59 days
New Zealand	Ian Leggat	96 years, 166 days
Pakistan	Fazal-ur-Rehman	91 years, 162 days
South Africa	Richard Dumbrill	88 years, 1 day
Sri Lanka	Lalith Kaluperuma	77 years, 148 days
West Indies	Cammie Smith	93 years, 114 days
Zimbabwe	John Traicos	79 years, 187 days

Note: Twenty-seven first-class cricketers are known to have attained centenarian status (see relevant section below).

== Oldest Test cricketers still playing at Test level ==
Name	Country	Date of birth	Debut	Age as of 20 November 2026
Craig Ervine	Zimbabwe	19 August 1985	4 August 2011	41 years, 93 days
Brendan Taylor	Zimbabwe	6 February 1986	6 May 2004	40 years, 287 days
Sikandar Raza	Zimbabwe	24 April 1986	3 September 2013	40 years, 208 days
Graeme Cremer	Zimbabwe	19 September 1986	6 January 2005	40 years, 62 days
Noman Ali	Pakistan	7 October 1986	26 January 2021	40 years, 44 days

== Oldest Test cricketers still playing at Test level, by country ==
Country	Name	Age as of 20 November 2026
Afghanistan	Yamin Ahmadzai	34 years, 118 days
Australia	Nathan Lyon	39 years, 0 days
Bangladesh	Mushfiqur Rahim	39 years, 195 days
England	Joe Root	35 years, 325 days
India	Ravindra Jadeja	37 years, 349 days
Ireland	Craig Young	36 years, 230 days
New Zealand	Ajaz Patel	38 years, 30 days
Pakistan	Noman Ali	40 years, 44 days
South Africa	Simon Harmer	37 years, 283 days
Sri Lanka	Dinesh Chandimal	37 years, 2 days
West Indies	Kemar Roach	38 years, 143 days
Zimbabwe	Craig Ervine	41 years, 93 days

Note: The above lists include players who have played Test cricket within the past 24 months and have not formally announced their retirement.

== Longest-lived Test cricketers ==
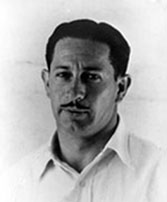
Norman Gordon of South Africa, the only Test cricketer to live to 100

See also Oldest living Test cricketers above.

Name	Country	Date of birth	Debut	Last match	Date of death	Age
Norman Gordon	South Africa	6 August 1911	24 December 1938	14 March 1939	2 September 2014	103 years, 27 days
Eric Tindill	New Zealand	18 December 1910	26 June 1937	25 March 1947	1 August 2010	99 years, 226 days
Francis MacKinnon	England	9 April 1848	2 January 1879	4 January 1879	27 February 1947	98 years, 324 days
John Watkins	South Africa	10 April 1923	24 December 1949	5 January 1957	3 September 2021	98 years, 146 days
Ronald Draper	South Africa	24 December 1926	10 February 1950	3 March 1950	25 February 2025	98 years, 63 days
Lindsay Tuckett	South Africa	6 February 1919	7 June 1947	9 March 1949	5 September 2016	97 years, 212 days
Donald Smith	England	14 June 1923	20 June 1957	27 July 1957	10 January 2021	97 years, 210 days
Jack Kerr	New Zealand	28 December 1910	27 June 1931	27 July 1937	27 May 2007	96 years, 150 days
Trevor McMahon	New Zealand	8 November 1929	13 October 1955	6 February 1956	12 March 2026	96 years, 124 days
C. D. Gopinath	India	1 March 1930	14 March 1951	28 January 1960	9 April 2026	96 years, 39 days
Wazir Mohammad	Pakistan	22 December 1929	13 November 1952	18 November 1959	13 October 2025	95 years, 295 days
Wilfred Rhodes	England	29 October 1877	1 June 1899	12 April 1930	8 July 1973	95 years, 252 days
Bill Brown	Australia	31 July 1912	8 June 1934	29 June 1948	16 March 2008	95 years, 229 days
Lindsay Weir	New Zealand	2 June 1908	24 January 1930	17 August 1937	31 October 2003	95 years, 151 days
Everton Weekes	West Indies	26 February 1925	21 January 1948	31 March 1958	1 July 2020	95 years, 126 days
Datta Gaekwad	India	27 October 1928	5 June 1952	18 January 1961	13 February 2024	95 years, 109 days
Ken Archer	Australia	17 January 1928	22 December 1950	5 December 1951	14 April 2023	95 years, 87 days
Andy Ganteaume	West Indies	22 January 1921	11 February 1948	16 February 1948	17 February 2016	95 years, 26 days
Sydney Barnes	England	19 April 1873	13 December 1901	18 February 1914	26 December 1967	94 years, 251 days
Esmond Kentish	West Indies	21 November 1916	27 March 1948	21 January 1954	10 June 2011	94 years, 201 days

== Oldest Test debutants ==
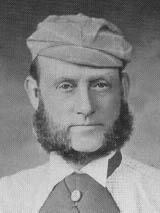
James Southerton, the oldest player on debut

Name	Country	Date of birth	Debut	Age at debut
James Southerton	England	16 November 1827	15 March 1877	49 years, 119 days
Miran Bakhsh	Pakistan	20 April 1907	29 January 1955	47 years, 284 days
Don Blackie	Australia	5 April 1882	14 December 1928	46 years, 253 days
Bert Ironmonger	Australia	7 April 1882	30 November 1928	46 years, 237 days
Nelson Betancourt	West Indies	4 June 1887	1 February 1930	42 years, 242 days
Rockley Wilson	England	25 March 1879	25 February 1921	41 years, 337 days
Rustomji Jamshedji	India	18 November 1892	15 December 1933	41 years, 27 days

== Oldest Test debutant by country ==
Country	Name	Age at debut
Australia	Don Blackie	46 years, 253 days
Afghanistan	Noor Ali Zadran	35 years, 207 days
Bangladesh	Enamul Haque	35 years, 58 days
England	James Southerton	49 years, 119 days
India	Rustomji Jamshedji	41 years, 27 days
Ireland	Ed Joyce	39 years, 232 days
New Zealand	Herb McGirr	38 years, 101 days
Pakistan	Miran Bakhsh	47 years, 284 days
South Africa	Omar Henry	40 years, 295 days
Sri Lanka	Somachandra de Silva	39 years, 251 days
West Indies	Nelson Betancourt	42 years, 242 days
Zimbabwe	Andy Waller	37 years, 84 days

Note: John Traicos debuted for Zimbabwe at the age of 45 years, 154 days, but had already played three Tests for South Africa 22 years prior.

Note: The oldest debutant, James Southerton, was also the first Test cricketer to die (on 16 June 1880). Miran Bakhsh was known as Miran Bux during his playing career.

== Oldest Test cricketers on final appearance ==
Name	Country	Date of birth	Test Debut	Last match	Age at last Test
Wilfred Rhodes	England	29 October 1877	1 June 1899	12 April 1930	52 years, 165 days
Bert Ironmonger	Australia	7 April 1882	30 November 1928	28 February 1933	50 years, 327 days
WG Grace	England	18 July 1848	6 September 1880	3 June 1899	50 years, 320 days
George Gunn	England	13 June 1879	13 December 1907	12 April 1930	50 years, 303 days
James Southerton	England	16 November 1827	15 March 1877	4 April 1877	49 years, 139 days
Miran Bakhsh	Pakistan	20 April 1907	29 January 1955	16 February 1955	47 years, 302 days
Sir Jack Hobbs	England	16 December 1882	1 January 1908	22 August 1930	47 years, 249 days
Frank Woolley	England	27 May 1887	9 August 1909	22 August 1934	47 years, 87 days
Don Blackie	Australia	5 April 1882	14 December 1928	8 February 1929	46 years, 309 days
Bert Strudwick	England	28 January 1880	1 January 1910	18 August 1926	46 years, 202 days

== Oldest Test cricketers on final appearance by country ==
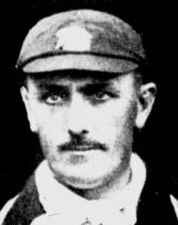
Wilfred Rhodes, England Test cricketer from 1899 until 1930

Country	Name	Age
Australia	Bert Ironmonger	50 years, 327 days
Bangladesh	Mushfiqur Rahim	39 years, 194 days
England	Wilfred Rhodes	52 years, 165 days
India	Vinoo Mankad	41 years, 305 days
Ireland	Ed Joyce	39 years, 231 days
New Zealand	Jack Alabaster	41 years, 247 days
Pakistan	Miran Bakhsh	47 years, 302 days
South Africa	Dave Nourse	45 years, 207 days
Sri Lanka	Somachandra de Silva	42 years, 78 days
West Indies	George Headley	44 years, 236 days
Zimbabwe	John Traicos	45 years, 304 days

Note: The Test career of Wilfred Rhodes spanned a record 30 years, 315 days. England's second-youngest Test cricketer and another Yorkshireman, Brian Close (born 24 February 1931), lies second in this regard. He made his debut against New Zealand in 1949 and was recalled, after an absence of almost nine years, to oppose West Indies in 1976 (his career lasting 26 years, 356 days).

== Longest-lived first-class cricketers ==
This list includes all those first-class players who are known to have lived to 100.

Deceased Living

Rank	Name	Team(s)	Birth date	Death date	Age	Nationality
1	John Manners	Hampshire, Combined Services	25 September 1914	7 March 2020	105 years, 225 days	England
2	Jim Hutchinson	Derbyshire	29 November 1896	7 November 2000	103 years, 344 days	England
3	Syd Ward	Wellington	5 August 1907	31 December 2010	103 years, 148 days	New Zealand
4	Norman Gordon	South Africa, Transvaal	6 August 1911	2 September 2014	103 years, 27 days	South Africa
5	Rupert de Smidt	Western Province	23 November 1883	3 August 1986	102 years, 253 days	South Africa
6	Edward English	Hampshire	1 January 1864	5 September 1966	102 years, 247 days	England
7	Cyril Perkins	Northamptonshire, Minor Counties	4 June 1911	21 November 2013	102 years, 170 days	England
8	John Wheatley	Canterbury	8 January 1860	19 April 1962	102 years, 101 days	New Zealand
9	Archie Scott	Scotland	26 January 1918	1 November 2019	101 years, 272 days	Scotland
10	Ted Martin	Western Australia	30 September 1902	9 June 2004	101 years, 253 days	Australia
11	D. B. Deodhar	Hindus, Maharashtra	14 January 1892	24 August 1993	101 years, 222 days	India
12	George Harman	Dublin University	6 June 1874	14 December 1975	101 years, 191 days	Ireland
13	Fred Gibson	Leicestershire	13 February 1912	28 June 2013	101 years, 135 days	Jamaica (lived in England)
14	Alan Finlayson	Eastern Province	1 September 1900	28 October 2001	101 years, 57 days	South Africa
15	Neil McCorkell	Hampshire, Players	23 March 1912	28 February 2013	100 years, 342 days	England
16	Raghunath Chandorkar	Bombay	21 November 1920	3 September 2021	100 years, 286 days	India
17	Geoffrey Beck	Oxford University	16 June 1918	5 March 2019	100 years, 262 days	England
18	Harold Stapleton	New South Wales	7 January 1915	24 September 2015	100 years, 260 days	Australia
19	Alan Burgess	Canterbury	1 May 1920	5 January 2021	100 years, 249 days	New Zealand
20	Rusi Cooper	Parsees, Bombay, Middlesex	14 December 1922	31 July 2023	100 years, 229 days	India
21	Charles Braithwaite	English Residents, Players of USA	10 September 1845	15 April 1946	100 years, 217 days	United States
22	Harry Forsyth	Dublin University	18 December 1903	19 July 2004	100 years, 214 days	Ireland
23	Jack Laver	Tasmania	9 March 1917	3 October 2017	100 years, 208 days	Australia
24	Tom Pritchard	Wellington, Warwickshire	10 March 1917	22 August 2017	100 years, 165 days	New Zealand
25	Bernarr Notley	Nottinghamshire	31 August 1918	22 January 2019	100 years, 144 days	England
26	Vasant Raiji	Bombay, Baroda	26 January 1920	13 June 2020	100 years, 139 days	India
27	George Deane	Hampshire	11 December 1828	26 February 1929	100 years, 77 days	England

Note: Although born in New South Wales, Australia, Syd Ward and John Wheatley appear to have been raised in New Zealand. George Harman, who acquired two Rugby Union caps for Ireland, died in Cornwall. Charles Braithwaite was born in England. Fred Gibson moved to England in 1944. Neil McCorkell was born in England, but lived in South Africa from 1951. The prominent Antiguan cricketer, Sir Sydney Walling, who died aged 102 years, 88 days in October 2009, never appeared in matches accorded first-class status.

The oldest person, and only septuagenarian, to play first-class cricket was Raja Maharaj Singh, aged 72, his sole appearance being for the Bombay Governor's XI against a Commonwealth XI in November 1950. Thirteen players have played first-class cricket in their sixties, most of them in England in the 19th century.

== Oldest women cricketers ==
England women's cricketer Eileen Whelan (later Eileen Ash), born 30 October 1911, was the first female Test cricketer to attain centenarian status; she died on 3 December 2021, aged 110 years 34 days.

== Oldest living ODI cricketers ==
The first One-Day International took place on 5 January 1971 when Australia played England.

Name	Country	Date of birth	Debut	Last match	Age as of 20 November 2026
Lance Gibbs	West Indies	29 September 1934	5 September 1973	7 June 1975	92 years, 52 days
Rohan Kanhai	West Indies	26 December 1935	5 September 1973	21 June 1975	90 years, 329 days
Bill Lawry	Australia	11 February 1937	5 January 1971	5 January 1971	89 years, 282 days
Farokh Engineer	India	25 February 1938	13 July 1974	14 June 1975	88 years, 268 days
Michael Tissera	Sri Lanka	23 March 1939	7 June 1975	14 June 1975	87 years, 242 days
Alan Connolly	Australia	29 June 1939	5 January 1971	5 January 1971	87 years, 144 days
Ron Headley	West Indies	29 June 1939	7 September 1973	7 September 1973	87 years, 144 days
Glenroy Sealy	Canada	11 June 1940	9 June 1979	16 June 1979	86 years, 162 days
Sir Geoffrey Boycott	England	21 October 1940	5 January 1971	20 December 1981	86 years, 30 days
Nasim-ul-Ghani	Pakistan	14 May 1941	11 February 1973	11 February 1973	85 years, 190 days

== Oldest living Twenty20 International cricketers ==
The first Twenty20 International took place on 17 February 2005 when Australia played New Zealand.

Name	Country	Date of birth	Debut	Last match	Age as of 20 November 2026
Osman Göker	Turkey	1 March 1960	29 August 2019	29 August 2019	66 years, 264 days
Cengiz Akyüz	Turkey	1 June 1962	29 August 2019	29 August 2019	64 years, 172 days
Serdar Kansoy	Turkey	6 July 1962	29 August 2019	31 August 2019	64 years, 137 days
Christian Rocca	Gibraltar	8 March 1965	13 May 2022	14 May 2022	61 years, 257 days
Hasan Alta	Turkey	25 May 1965	29 August 2019	31 August 2019	61 years, 179 days
James Moses	Botswana	8 August 1965	20 May 2019	7 November 2021	61 years, 104 days
Mark Oman	Slovenia	5 September 1966	25 July 2022	30 July 2022	60 years, 76 days
Sunil Dhaniram	Canada	17 October 1968	2 August 2008	10 February 2010	58 years, 34 days
Tony Whiteman	Luxembourg	24 May 1969	29 August 2019	5 September 2021	57 years, 180 days
Sanath Jayasuriya	Sri Lanka	30 June 1969	15 June 2006	25 June 2011	57 years, 143 days
