= Fred Gibson (cricketer) =

Jamaican-born English cricketer

Personal information
- Full name: Alfred Leonard Gibson
- Born: 13 February 1912; Devon, Middlesex County, Jamaica
- Died: 28 June 2013 (aged 101); Manton, Rutland, England
- Nickname: Fred
- Batting: Right-handed

Domestic team information
- Years: Team
- 1946: Leicestershire

Career statistics
Competition	First-class
Matches	2
Runs scored	17
Batting average	5.66
100s/50s	–/–
Top score	11
Catches/stumpings	–/–
- Source: Cricinfo, 21 January 2013

Alfred Leonard Gibson (13 February 1912 – 28 June 2013) was a Jamaican-born English cricketer. Gibson was a right-handed batsman. On 13 February 2012, he became the 15th former first-class player to reach 100 years of age, and the 5th county cricketer to do so.

Born at Devon, Jamaica, where he was taught cricket by the manager of a banana plantation and once played in a match featuring George Headley. Gibson moved to England in 1944, accompanied by a friend, where he joined the Royal Air Force and saw service in the later stages of World War II while stationed near Melton Mowbray in Leicestershire. Following the war, Leicestershire County Cricket Club secretary Cecil Wood was given the task of building a team for the resumption of first-class cricket, with Gibson impressing Wood in friendly one-day matches against Northamptonshire and Nottinghamshire in 1945. He was offered the chance to play for Leicestershire in 1946, making two first-class appearances against Yorkshire in the County Championship at Headingley and Oxford University at the University Parks. He scored a total of 17 runs in his two matches, at an average of 5.66, with a high score of 11. He suffered arm and head injuries in a car accident midway through the 1946 season and was not reengaged by the county.

He later married an English woman and worked as a technician for Rolls-Royce. Gibson is also noted as being one of the first black persons to be elected as a councillor in England when he was elected to represent Mountsorrel on the local council, Barrow upon Soar Rural District.

Gibson died at a nursing home at Manton, Rutland on 28 June 2013. At the time of his death he was the second-oldest surviving county cricketer, behind Cyril Perkins.

== See also ==
- Lists of oldest cricketers
