= Bernarr =

Bernarr is a given name. Notable people with the name include:

- Bernarr Macfadden (1868–1955), American proponent of physical culture
- Bernarr Notley (1918–2019), English cricketer
- Bernarr Prendergast (1911–1966), British-Jamaican track and field athlete
- Bernarr Rainbow (1914–1998), British historian of music education, organist, and choir master

== See also ==
- Bernar Venet (born 1941), French conceptual artist
- Durand Bernarr, American singer-songwriter and producer
