= James Southerton =

English cricketer (1827–1880)

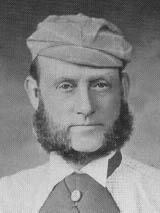

Personal information
- Full name: James Southerton
- Born: 16 November 1827; Petworth, Sussex, England
- Died: 16 June 1880 (aged 52); Mitcham, Surrey, England
- Nickname: Man of Many Counties
- Height: 5 ft 6 in (1.68 m)
- Batting: Right-handed
- Bowling: Right-arm roundarm slow Right-arm overarm slow

International information
- National side: England
- Test debut (cap 10): 15 March 1877 v Australia
- Last Test: 4 April 1877 v Australia

Domestic team information
- Years: Team
- 1854–1879: Surrey
- 1858–1872: Sussex
- 1861: Hampshire (pre-1864)
- 1864–1867: Hampshire

Umpiring information
- FC umpired: 12 (1864–1879)

Career statistics
Competition	Test	First-class
Matches	2	286
Runs scored	7	3,159
Batting average	3.50	9.02
100s/50s	0/0	0/3
Top score	6	82
Balls bowled	263	68,668
Wickets	7	1,682
Bowling average	15.28	14.43
5 wickets in innings	0	192
10 wickets in match	0	59
Best bowling	4/46	9/30
Catches/stumpings	2/–	215/3
- Source: ESPNcricinfo, 13 April 2020

James Southerton (16 November 1827 – 16 June 1880) was an English professional cricketer whose first-class career spanned 26 seasons from 1854 to 1879. Right-handed as both a batsman and bowler, he began his career as a specialist batsman. Having found little success as a batsman, he decided to concentrate on bowling and, using a roundarm action, developed into an outstanding slow bowler who took 1,682 wickets in his first-class career from 286 matches.

In the 1870 season, Southerton became the first bowler to take 200 first-class wickets in a season. He toured Australia in 1876–77 with James Lillywhite's team, and played for England against Australia at the Melbourne Cricket Ground, in what is retrospectively recognised as the first-ever Test match. He was 49 years and 119 days old when the match began, and remains the oldest Test debutant. In domestic cricket, Southerton was mostly associated with the county teams of Hampshire, Surrey, and Sussex. As he tended to play for more than one county in a season, he became known as the 'Man of Many Counties', and it was largely because of him that residence qualifications were introduced ahead of the 1873 season.

Southerton stood intermittently as an umpire between 1864 and 1879. For the last ten years of his life, he was the landlord of The Cricketers public house in Mitcham. He became the first Test cricketer to die when he succumbed to a short attack of pleurisy in June 1880, aged 52.

== Cricket ==
=== Early career ===
James Southerton was born in Petworth, Sussex on 16 November 1827. His family moved from Petworth to Mitcham, Surrey when he was three months old. By occupation a barber, he made his debut in first-class cricket for Surrey against Sussex at Hove in 1854. The following season he played twice for Surrey, against an All England Eleven and Sussex. Two years would elapse before he next played for Surrey, against Manchester at Eccles in 1857. Southerton departed Surrey ahead of the 1858 season and was engaged by Sussex. He made four first-class appearances for Sussex during the 1858 season, and one for a combined Kent and Sussex team against Surrey, but was forced to withdraw from their team due to over-exertion, amongst other causes. He returned in 1859 to play one match against the Marylebone Cricket Club (MCC) at Lord's. For the first five years of his career, Southerton specialised as a batsman, but he had little success and could only once achieve a season average in double figures.

=== 'Man of Many Counties' ===
Southerton would spend a further season with Sussex in 1860, making two appearances, alongside playing for the South in the North v South fixture at Sleaford. In 1861, he was engaged by Hampshire at the Antelope Ground, with him playing once in first-class cricket against the MCC that season. He remained engaged with Hampshire in 1862, and although Hampshire did not play any major fixtures that year, Southerton still appeared in minor matches for the Union Club which was based in Southampton. He continued to be engaged at the Antelope Ground in 1867, operating in a period before regulations prevented anyone playing for more than one county in the same season. Thus, during this period he played for both the newly formed Hampshire County Cricket Club and Sussex, having settled a dispute between himself and his native county which had prevented him from playing for them, whilst also returning to play for Surrey in 1867; this earned him the monicker 'The Man of Many Counties'.

It was while playing exclusively for Hampshire in 1865 and 1866 that his right-arm slow bowling, which was to bring him much fame, came to the fore. In the 1860s, the predominant bowling style of the time was mainly roundarm fast. Southerton delivered the ball at a slower speed, which had deceptive flight and a sharp break. He achieved this by bowling with a twisting action, and had the ability to vary his pace and pitch to further deceive batsmen. His bowling proved a challenge to batsman, one which they were not easily able to adapt to. When he bowled outside the off stump, the ball was able to turn viciously off the unprepared pitches of the time into right-handed batsmen. His variation of pace relied upon a faster and straighter delivery, contrasting his slow, turning stock ball. He possessed a strong sense of knowing which type of delivery would be most difficult for the opposing batsman to play. Southerton played a large part in Hampshire's inaugural first-class victory against Surrey in 1865, taking 7 wickets for 45 runs. Having taken 21 wickets from three matches in 1865 and 32 from four matches in 1866, Southerton took 132 wickets in 1867 at an average of 14.14; he took nineteen five wicket hauls and ten-wickets in a match on five occasions across the season. He had been afforded greater playing opportunities by appearing for Surrey in 1867, who had a busier playing programme compared to other counties.

He departed the Antelope Ground ahead of the 1868 season, and played for both Surrey and Sussex in sixteen matches across that season, in addition to playing for the Players of the South against the Gentlemen of the South. During the 1868 season, aided by an exceptionally hot summer, he took 151 wickets and became the most successful bowler in England. The following season, in which he played once again for both Surrey and Sussex, he took 136 wickets at an average of 15.30. In 1870, he became the first bowler to reach 200 wickets in a first-class season, and played in as many as 27 of only 49 first-class matches played during the entire year in England. At the age of 42, he made his first appearance for the Players in the 1870 Gentlemen v Players match, which was considered the biggest match of the season. During this period it was said that Southerton was the one bowler able to defeat or even contain the brilliant batting of W. G. Grace. He remained one of the leading bowlers in county cricket between 1871 and 1875, taking over 100 wickets in each of those season. He notably took 16 wickets for 52 runs in a day for the South against the North on a sticky wicket at Lord's on 17 May 1875, which included his career-best innings figures of 9 for 30 in the South's first innings. He bowled 6,089 balls in the 1875 season, and for Surrey he is reputed to have not bowled a single wide.

=== Test cricket and later career ===
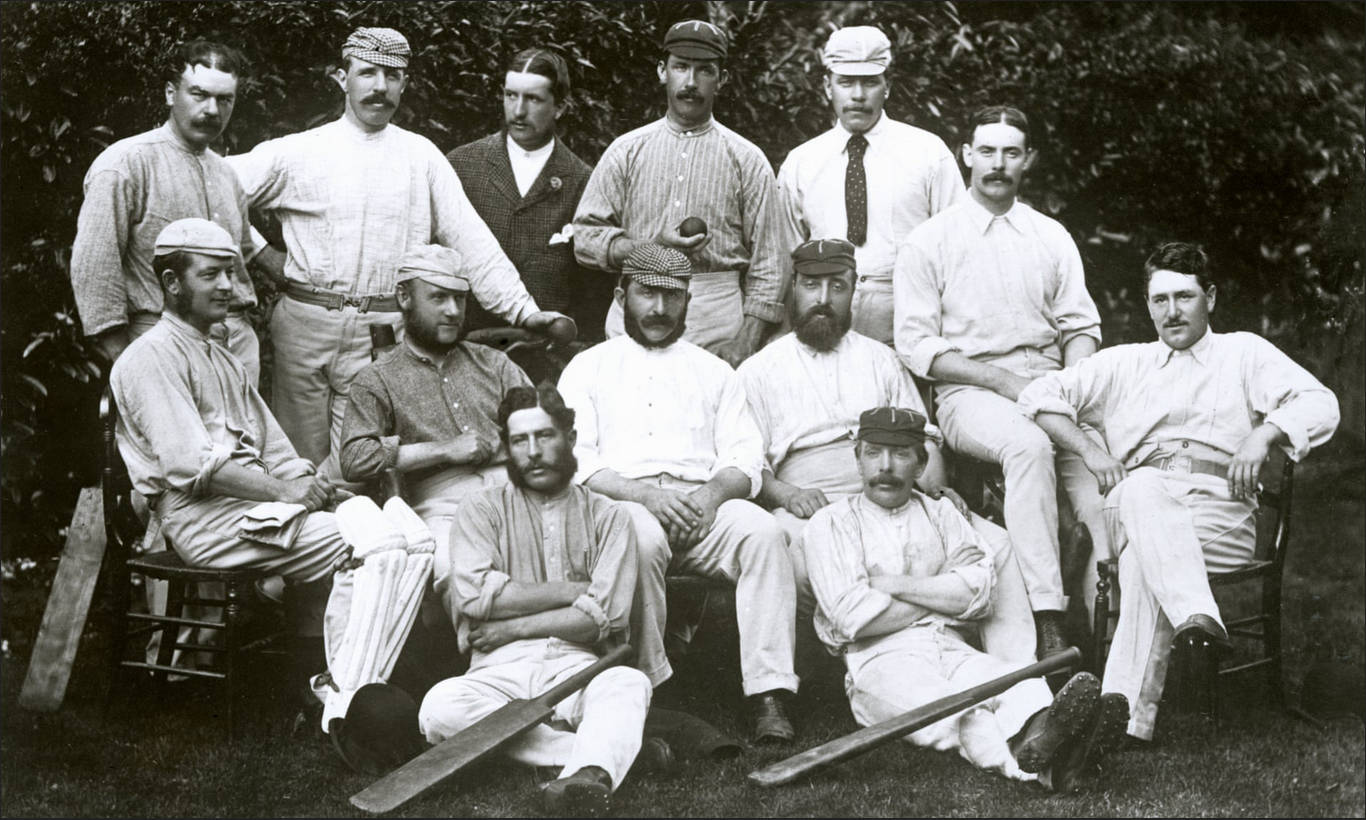
The English touring team in 1876. Southerton is seated second from left.

Southerton had previously been chosen to tour with a team captained by W. G. Grace in the winter which followed the 1873 season, although none of the matches played during the tour were afforded first-class status. Southerton was critical of Grace's captaincy on the tour, labelling him a "damn bad captain". Although his bowling returns had declined somewhat in the 1876 season, with 28 fewer wickets than the previous year (136 wickets), he toured Australia as second-in-command of James Lillywhite's side the following winter. After featuring in a first-class match against New South Wales, he was chosen to play in the first-ever Test match, played between England and Australia at the Melbourne Cricket Ground (MCG). Southerton was 49 years and 119 days old when he made his Test debut, making him the oldest ever Test debutant. On debut, he broke the 77 runs partnership of Charles Bannerman and Bransby Cooper, on his way to claiming figures of 3 for 61 in the Australians first innings. He played in the 2nd Test twelve days later, which was also played at the MCG. He took 4 for 46 in the Australians second innings, with England winning the match by four wickets to tie the series. These wickets bought his total Test tally to 7 wickets at an average of 15.28. Southerton also accompanied the touring party to New Zealand, but no matches of status were played there.

Returning home, age began to catch up with Southerton, and in the 1877 season he failed to take 100 first-class wickets in a season for the first time since 1866, though his average remained healthy. This was to be the case in the 1878 and 1879 seasons, where he was afforded fewer playing opportunities with Surrey, though his bowling average remained consistently good. In his latter years, his bowling was characterised as a "very slow deliberate throw", and much like Lancashire's Alec Watson, who was often nicknamed "the Southerton of the North", the fairness of Southerton's delivery was sometimes called into question. However, he was never called for throwing by any umpire. Southerton retired at the conclusion of the 1879 season, having been afforded a benefit match during the North v South match at The Oval in July, where the weather noted as being unfavourable for large periods of play. Following his retirement, he was appointed superintendent of the bowlers at The Oval by Surrey.

=== Playing style and career statistics ===
Southerton's first-class career spanned from 1854 to 1879. He began his career as a batsman, but found little in the way of success in this role, both prior to and after he became a skilled bowler. Haygarth noted that he was an attacking batsman, while W. G. Grace wrote that Southerton seldom defended the ball, and was known to close his eyes when striking out. In 286 first-class matches, he would score 3,159 runs at an average of 9.02; he did not score a century during his career, only passing fifty on three occasions, with a highest score of 82. After a slow start as a bowler, he became, along with Alfred Shaw, the greatest slow bowler of the 1870s. As he progressed as a bowler, his arm at the point of release got higher and higher, so much so that his classification changed from a roundarm bowling to an overarm bowler. A. G. Steel later remarked that he could bowl consistently for hours "with only a very occasional variation from a perfect good length". Utilising the unprepared pitches of the era, he took 1,682 wickets at an average of 14.43 across his career; he took 192 five wicket hauls and ten-wickets in a match on 59 occasions. He had most success for Surrey, taking 995 wickets for the county. He also took 269 wickets for Sussex, in addition to 183 for the South. His bowling average was significantly higher when playing in the Gentlemen v Players match. He was noted to be a good fielder at slip, and across his career he took 215 catches, 109 of which came for Surrey.

=== Umpiring ===
Southerton first stood as a first-class umpire in the 1864 fixture between Surrey and the South of England. Nine years would elapse before he next stood, doing so in the 1873 Gentlemen v Players fixture. He would stand in first-class cricket between 1877 and 1879, doing so on ten occasions. W. G. Grace considered Southerton a "hazy" umpire, prone to errors. Grace recalled an incident during their 1873–74 Australia tour when Southerton was umpiring in a match played at Castlemaine, when he was caught by the fielder, who subsequently fell over the boundary rope. Southerton adjudged Grace to be not out, claiming that the fielder had caught the ball well over the rope; Grace subsequently ran five runs, but Southerton only awarded one run, when the decision should have either resulted in Grace's dismissal, or the awarding of the five runs.

== Personal life and death ==
He was the landlord of The Cricketers public house and hotel at Mitcham Cricket Green, having taken up residence there around 1870. He was popular with the touring Australian teams, and would let them stay at The Cricketers while they trained on Mitcham Green. He became the first Test cricketer to die when he succumbed after a short attack of pleurisy at his Mitcham residence on 16 June 1880, just ten months after he had retired from playing. He had become ill the night prior to the derby match between Surrey and Middlesex, catching a chill that had confined him to bed for several days. Having sufficiently recovered, he returned to his superintendency duties at The Oval, but was beset by an attack of pleurisy shortly thereafter.

He was buried in the graveyard of Mitcham Parish Church, with his funeral attended by 118 professional and amateur cricketers from several counties, who walked two-by-two in front of his coffin and lined the churchyard on either side to form a guard of honour. Amongst the mourners were former contemporaries at Surrey and Mitcham, including C. W. Alcock, Edward Garland, Will Mortlock, William Shepherd, and John Swan. Several past and present cricketers acted as his pallbearers, amongst whom were Frederick Gale, Frederick Harwood, Richard Humphrey, Thomas Mantle, Tom Sewell, and Edgar Willsher. Just over a year later, a memorial was erected over his grave through public subscription. He had one son with Sarah Pratt, Sydney James (1874–1935), who was editor of the Wisden Cricketers' Almanack from 1934 to 1935.

== Works cited ==
- Ash, Russell; Morrison, Ian (2002). The Top 10 of Sport. London: Dorling Kindersley. ISBN 9780751346428.
- Corbett, Martin (1896). The Man on the March. London: Bliss, Sands, and Company. OCLC 18850536.
- Phillips, Giles (2012). Edgar Willsher: The Lion of Kent. Cardiff: ACS. ISBN 9781908165152.
- Haygarth, Arthur (1876). Frederick Lillywhite's Cricket scores and Biographies. Vol. 6. London: Longman. OCLC 1454929184.
- Lazenby, John (2015). The Strangers who Came Home. London: Bloomsbury Group. ISBN 9781408844663.
- Martin-Jenkins, Christopher (1996). World Cricketers: A Biographical Dictionary. Oxford University Press. ISBN 9780192100054.
- Rae, Simon (1998). W. G. Grace: A Life. London: Faber & Faber. ISBN 9780571178551.
- Steel, A. G.; Lyttelton, Hon. R. H. (1898). Cricket. London: Longmans, Green, and Co.
- Wilde, Simon (2018). England: The Biography. New York City: Simon & Schuster. ISBN 9781471154867.
- Wilde, Simon (2023). The Tour: The Story of the England Cricket Team Overseas 1877-2022. New York City: Simon & Schuster. ISBN 9781471198496.
- Wynne-Thomas, Peter (1983). The Rigby A-Z of Cricket Records. Adelaide: Rigby. ISBN 9780727018687.

Preceded by None	Oldest Living Test Cricketer; 15 March 1877 – 16 June 1880	Succeeded by Ned Gregory; Nat Thomson
