= George Deane (cricketer) =

English cricketer

George Onslow Deane
Personal information
- Full name: George Onslow Deane
- Born: 11 December 1828; Bighton, Hampshire, England
- Died: 16 February 1929 (aged 100); Dymock, Gloucestershire, England
- Batting: Unknown

Domestic team information
- Years: Team
- 1848: Hampshire

Career statistics
Competition	First-class
Matches	1
Runs scored	0
Batting average	0.00
100s/50s	–/–
Top score	0
Catches/stumpings	1/–
- Source: Cricinfo, 1 May 2010

George Onslow Deane (11 December 1828 – 16 February 1929) was an English cricketer.

== Life ==
He was born at Bighton, Hampshire, where his father George Deane (died 1872) was vicar; his mother was Mary Grant, daughter of Thomas Grant of Soberton. He was educated at Winchester College from 1839, and matriculated at Christ Church, Oxford in 1846. He became an ensign in the 22nd Foot in 1848, and a lieutenant in 1851, retiring in 1854. In later life he was a Justice of the Peace for Gloucestershire, residing at The Boyce Court.

Deane had the distinction of becoming the first first-class cricketer to reach the age of 100. He died on 16 February 1929 at Dymock, Gloucestershire aged 100 years and 77 days. He was the only person who played first-class cricket for Hampshire before the formation of Hampshire County Cricket Club to reach 100 years of age.

== Cricketer ==
Deane's batting style is unknown. He made a single first-class appearance for Hampshire against an All England Eleven in 1848 at Southampton. Deane was dismissed twice for a duck in this match, by William Hillyer in Hampshire's first-innings, and by John Wisden in their second-innings. The match ended as a draw. This was his only major appearance for Hampshire.

Three other cricketers who played first-class cricket after the formation of Hampshire County Cricket Club have also reached 100 years of age: Edward English in 1964, Neil McCorkell in 2012 and John Manners in 2014.

== Family ==
Deane married in 1852 Georgiana Matilda Drummond, daughter of John Drummond of Boyce Court, near Dymock, Gloucestershire. Their son Horace (1854–1930), later Horace Deane-Drummond, married as his second wife Sophie Pemberton; he was an army officer, tea planter in Ceylon and rubber planter in Travancore. His son John Drummond Deane-Drummond by his first marriage to Caroline Betha Vansittart (died 1919, daughter of William Vansittart, previously married to Reginald Wynniatt) was father to Anthony Deane-Drummond.

Deane was the Godfather to Alice Jane Hammersley b 4 March 1852; the daughter of William Hammersley first-class cricketer.

== See also ==
- Longest-lived first-class cricketers
