= Ali Bacher =

South African cricketer (born 1942)

Personal information
- Full name: Aron Bacher
- Born: 24 May 1942 (age 84); Roodepoort, South Africa
- Batting: Right-handed
- Bowling: Legbreak
- Relatives: Adam Bacher (nephew)

International information
- National side: South Africa
- Test debut: 22 July 1965 v England
- Last Test: 5 March 1970 v Australia

Career statistics
Competition	Test	First-class
Matches	12	120
Runs scored	679	7,894
Batting average	32.33	39.07
100s/50s	0/6	18/45
Top score	73	235
Balls bowled	–	114
Wickets	–	2
Bowling average	–	43.50
5 wickets in innings	–	0
10 wickets in match	–	0
Best bowling	–	1/8
Catches/stumpings	10/–	110/1
- Source: Cricinfo, 13 November 2022

Aron "Ali" Bacher (born 24 May 1942) is a former South African Test cricket captain and an administrator of the United Cricket Board of South Africa.

== Personal life ==
Bacher was born in May 1942 in Roodepoort to Lithuanian-Jewish parents who had migrated to South Africa. He got his nickname "Ali" at the age of seven from the story of Ali Baba. Bacher married Shira Teeger in 1965, and they have two daughters and one son. His nephew Adam Bacher played Test cricket for South Africa in the 1990s.

He studied at the University of the Witwatersrand and became a general practitioner. He worked as a GP for nine years but left the field, saying, "I realised I was getting too emotionally involved with the patients." In 1979 he briefly went into a family business.

== Cricket career ==
Bacher started playing cricket while at King Edward VII School in Johannesburg, and represented Transvaal at the age of 17. He was appointed captain of Transvaal for the 1963–64 season, in place of John Waite, who was on tour with the South African national side in Australia. He played in 12 Tests for South Africa, three against England and nine against Australia; he was captain in the last four. In a first-class match for Transvaal against the visiting Australian cricket team in 1966–67, he made 235 in the second innings, the record score for any South African team against Australia, took five catches, and led his team to Australia's first ever defeat in South Africa. He later played important innings in Test victories over Australia in the First, Third and Fifth Tests.

He captained the national team in only one series: in 1969–70 against Australia at home, in which the South Africans won all four Tests. He was selected to captain the touring teams to England in 1970 and Australia in 1971–72, but neither tour eventuated, owing to anti-apartheid protests in the host countries. In 1972 he became the first player to make 5000 runs in the Currie Cup. He was awarded South Africa's Sports Merit Award (its top athletics honour) in 1972.

== Administrative career ==
In 1981 Bacher had heart bypass surgery, then took up the job of leading Transvaal's newly professionalised cricket administration. He was made managing director of the South African Cricket Union in the late 1980s.

Believing that apartheid would not end in his lifetime, and determined to maintain the vigour of South African cricket, he encouraged tours by "rebel" teams from Sri Lanka, England, West Indies and Australia during the 1980s. At the same time he recognised that South African cricket had no long-term future unless cricketers in the non-white communities were encouraged to develop their potential, and he organised mass coaching clinics and development programs in the black townships.

When apartheid began to collapse in 1990, Bacher immediately set out to form one body to oversee all cricket in South Africa: he contacted Steve Tshwete, the head of the ANC's sports desk, to help get the parties to agree on a unified body. Tshwete soon forged an agreement and the two men became friends, travelling to London together in 1991 to successfully apply for South Africa's re-admission to the International Cricket Council.

Bacher managed the South African team on its brief tour of India in 1991. He instigated cricket's first video-review system in 1992 and directed the planning for the 2003 Cricket World Cup.

In 2005 he joined the board of the South African Rugby Union as the sponsors' representative.

== Honours ==
In 2024, at the South African Jewish Board of Deputies' 120th anniversary gala dinner, he was honoured among 100 remarkable Jewish South Africans who have contributed to South Africa. The ceremony included speeches from Chief Rabbi Ephraim Mirvis, and Bacher was honoured among other cricketers such as Norman Gordon, Fred Susskind, Mandy Yachad and Dennis Gamsy.

== See also ==
- List of select Jewish cricketers

Preceded by Peter van der Merwe	South African Test cricket captain 1969/70	Succeeded by Kepler Wessels
