= Neil McCorkell =

English cricketer (1912–1913)

Personal information
- Full name: Neil Thomas McCorkell
- Born: 23 March 1912; Portsmouth, Hampshire, England
- Died: 28 February 2013 (aged 100); Uvongo, KwaZulu-Natal, South Africa
- Batting: Right-handed
- Bowling: Unknown
- Role: Wicket-keeper

Domestic team information
- Years: Team
- 1932–1951: Hampshire

Career statistics
Competition	First-class
Matches	396
Runs scored	16,106
Batting average	25.60
100s/50s	17/77
Top score	203
Balls bowled	177
Wickets	1
Bowling average	117.00
5 wickets in innings	–
10 wickets in match	–
Best bowling	1/73
Catches/stumpings	532/185
- Source: Cricinfo, 10 October 2009

Neil Thomas McCorkell (23 March 1912 — 28 February 2013) was an English first-class cricketer. A successor as Hampshire wicket-keeper to George Brown, McCorkell made his debut in first-class cricket in 1932. He played for Hampshire either side of the Second World War, with distinction as both a wicket-keeper and opening batsman. In 396 first-class matches, he scored over 16,000 runs and made 717 dismissals behind the stumps. He was Hampshire's most successful wicket-keeper until his records were surpassed by Bobby Parks. McCorkell never played Test cricket for England, largely due to the concurrent careers of the Kent wicket-keeping duo Les Ames and Godfrey Evans.

After his first-class career came to an end in 1951, McCorkell emigrated to South Africa to take up an appointment as a coach at Parktown Boys' High School in Johannesburg. In March 2012, he became the second Hampshire cricketer after Edward English to reach 100 years of age. McCorkell lived in South Africa until his death in February 2013.

== Early life ==
McCorkell was born in March 1912, at White Hart Lane (today White Hart Road) in Old Portsmouth. He was educated at the Portsmouth Town School, where he began to play cricket, but left the school at the age of 14 to work at the Officers' Sports Ground. With little coaching, he played for various church sides across Portsmouth and was selected to represent a Portsmouth District XI against a visiting Hampshire Club and Ground side, where his wicket-keeping caught the eye. Hampshire deliberated whether to bring him onto their staff, as at the time they were £3,000 in debt; ultimately they chose to in 1931, earmarking him as a replacement for George Brown.

== Cricket career ==
=== Pre-war cricket ===
McCorkell made his debut in first-class cricket for Hampshire against Somerset at Taunton in the 1932 County Championship, establishing himself as Hampshire's first-choice wicket-keeper with 28 appearances that season and gaining his county cap. He did well enough in his first season to be selected for the Players in the end of season Gentlemen v Players fixture at Folkestone. He made 33 first-class appearances during the following season, where he was reliable enough behind the stumps for Hampshire's 1933 Cricket Guide to remark "McCorkell has already shown that he has the right temperament for county cricket and he has a bright future". By 1935, his batting had developed to the extent that he was regularly opening the batting, with McCorkell passing 1,000 runs in a season for the first time in 1935 with 1,319 runs at an average of 24.42; he made two centuries in a week home and away against Lancashire, with scores of 150 and 154 not out respectively. He again passed 1,000 runs for the season in 1936, and was a contender for selection for the 1936–37 Ashes tour to Australia following a back injury to regular wicket-keeper Les Ames. His consideration led to his selection for the Players in the Gentlemen v Players fixture at Lord's, where it was noted that he "kept wicket tidily". Ultimately, Ames recovered following an operation on his back and went on the tour. A successful season followed in 1937, with McCorkell scoring 1,586 runs at an average of 27.82, scoring one century.

He toured British India with Lord Tennyson's (his former captain at Hampshire) personal team in the winter which followed the 1937 season, making ten first-class appearances on the tour. Batting in what The Times described as "strange conditions", and with a team which had a "pronounced sick-list", he scored 241 runs on the tour. He only came to prominence towards the end of the tour, having missed out on selection for the five unofficial-Tests against India. During some downtime on the tour, he accompanied Tennyson on a tiger shoot, whom he berated for accidentally shooting a goat. McCorkell made 33 first-class appearances in 1938, once again passing a thousand runs for the season with 1,586 runs at an average of 27.82, with a single century. The following season, he passed 1,000 runs for the fifth season in a row, with 1,030 runs at an average 22.39.

=== Post-war cricket ===
During the Second World War, McCorkell had hoped to serve as a submariner with the Royal Navy, but was refused when it transpired that he could not swim. He instead worked as a firefighter at the Vickers factory in Newbury, Berkshire. He also played in exhibition matches back in Southampton, appearing for the Supermarine works cricket team. Like so many other cricketers, he lost six of his prime playing years due to the war. He returned to play for Hampshire in 1946, having a modest season as a batsman with 641 runs at an average of 15.26, but had a prolific return to form in 1947, when he scored 1,665 runs at an average of 40.60, with two centuries and fifteen half centuries. He suffered a broken finger in 1948, which limited him to just fourteen matches, before making his highest run-scoring aggregate in 1949, with 1,871 runs across the season at an average of 38.18. In the proceeding two seasons he passed 1,000 runs, and in the 1951 County Championship he made his career-high score, with a double-century (203) against Gloucestershire at Gloucester. Toward the end of his playing career, he sometimes played solely as a batsman, with his understudy Leo Harrison keeping wicket.

McCorkell left Hampshire at the end of the 1951 season, to take up a coaching appointment in South Africa. For his final match against Sussex, he was appointed captain, but the occasion was ruined by rain which curtailed the match to just 68 overs in Hampshire's first innings. In 383 first-class matches for Hampshire, McCorkell scored 15,833 runs at an average of 25.87, with seventeen centuries and 76 half centuries. He batted with an unorthodox grip, with his hands far apart on the bat handle. He had a calm temperament when batting, coupled with great powers of concentration and a wide range of shots. Keeping-wicket, he took 512 catches and made 177 stumpings, which remained a Hampshire record until surpassed by Bobby Parks. John Arlott, commenting on his wicket-keeping skills in 1957, said that "he kept equally well to fast bowling and slow and, season in, season out, missed very few chances". The Times speculated that had it not been for the Kent wicket-keeping duo of Ames and Godfrey Evans, McCorkell might have had a successful career in Test cricket.

== Later life ==
Moving to South Africa with his wife and two sons, he was appointed cricket coach at Parktown Boys' High School in Johannesburg, where he worked for thirty years. The McCorkell Oval at the school is named after him. On 23 March 2012, he celebrated his 100th birthday at his Uvongo home, becoming the second Hampshire cricketer after Edward English to reach the landmark, (Note: Edward English reached 100 years of age on 1 January 1964 and represented Hampshire County Cricket Club from 1898 to 1901. George Deane also lived to the age of 100, reaching the landmark on 11 January 1928. Deane played first-class cricket for Hampshire, but not for Hampshire County Cricket Club. His only appearance came in 1848 for Hampshire county cricket team (pre-1864), a team representative of the county of Hampshire, but which pre-dated the formation of Hampshire County Cricket Club.) McCorkell died at Uvongo on 28 February 2013, at age 100. He was predeceased by his wife and had one surviving son. Prior to his death, he was the second-oldest English first-class cricketer, behind Cyril Perkins (1911–2013).

== See also ==
- Lists of oldest cricketers
