= Miran Bakhsh =

Pakistani cricketer (1907–1991)

Personal information
- Full name: Malik Miran Bakhsh
- Born: 20 April 1907; Rawalpindi, British India
- Died: 8 February 1991 (aged 83); Rawalpindi, Pakistan
- Batting: Right-handed
- Bowling: Right-arm offbreak

International information
- National side: Pakistan
- Test debut (cap 21): 29 January 1955 v India
- Last Test: 13 February 1955 v India

Career statistics
Competition	Test	First-class
Matches	2	15
Runs scored	1	53
Batting average	1.00	3.31
100s/50s	0/0	0/0
Top score	1*	23
Balls bowled	348	2,803
Wickets	2	48
Bowling average	57.50	19.43
5 wickets in innings	0	3
10 wickets in match	0	0
Best bowling	2/82	6/15
Catches/stumpings	0/–	2/–
- Source: ESPNCricinfo, 13 April 2020

Malik Miran Bakhsh (20 April 1907 – 8 February 1991), also known as Miran Bux, was a Pakistani international cricketer who played in two Test matches in 1955.

== Early life and family ==
Malik Miran Bakhsh was born on 20 April 1907 in Rawalpindi, British India. His father was a groundsman at the Pindi Club Ground.

== Career ==
Bakhsh made his first-class cricket debut in 1950, at the age of 43, representing Commander-in-Chief's Eleven. Before his first-class debut, he played in two day matches against West Indies and Commonwealth cricket team.

At the age of 47 years and 284 days, he made his Test debut against India at Lahore, making him the second oldest Test debutant, behind James Southerton. Unusually, this was only his second first-class cricket match.

A tall off-spinner, he had taken five wickets in a two-day match against the touring West Indians in 1948/49, and 10 in another two-day match against the Commonwealth XI in 1949/50. After his brief Test career ended, he continued playing first-class cricket in Pakistan until 1958/59, when at the age of 51, he took four wickets in his last match playing for Rawalpindi against Peshawar. His best bowling figures came in a match for Combined Services at Dacca in 1956/57, when he took 6 for 15 to help dismiss East Pakistan Whites for 33 runs.
