= Tom Pritchard =

New Zealand cricketer (1917–2017)

Personal information
- Full name: Thomas Leslie Pritchard
- Born: 10 March 1917; Kaupokonui, Taranaki, New Zealand
- Died: 22 August 2017 (aged 100); Levin, New Zealand
- Batting: Right-handed
- Bowling: Right-arm fast, right-arm fast-medium
- Role: Bowler

Domestic team information
- Years: Team
- 1937/38–1940/41: Wellington
- 1946–1955: Warwickshire
- 1956: Kent

Career statistics
Competition	First-class
Matches	200
Runs scored	3,363
Batting average	13.34
100s/50s	0/6
Top score	81
Balls bowled	42,871
Wickets	818
Bowling average	23.30
5 wickets in innings	48
10 wickets in match	11
Best bowling	8/20
Catches/stumpings	84/−
- Source: Cricinfo, 21 December 2020

Thomas Leslie Pritchard (10 March 1917 – 22 August 2017) was a New Zealand cricketer who played most of his first-class cricket in England. Pritchard was a genuinely fast right-arm bowler and a useful lower order right-handed batsman who played in several matches for Wellington before the Second World War. He said in 2013 that his memories of a game at the Basin Reserve and of playing for his country in 1939 were still strong.

Stationed in Egypt and then Italy with New Zealand forces during the war, he ended the war in England, playing cricket. He qualified for Warwickshire in 1947 and was highly successful for several seasons. His best year was 1948 when he took 172 wickets at an average of 18.75. In 1951, his bowling, by now fast-medium rather than outright fast, played a big part in Warwickshire's unexpected County Championship success. He took three hat tricks for the county during his career, as of 2016 still a record for the club.

His bowling declined across the 1950s, and he left Warwickshire after the 1955 season. He played a few matches for Kent in 1956, but was not a success and retired. His last match was against Warwickshire, and as a batsman he was out first ball as part of a hat-trick by Keith Dollery. He took 818 first-class wickets during his career and remains one of New Zealand's leading first-class wicket takers.

Pritchard met his wife Mavis at a dance in London when he was playing for Warwickshire. They were married for 64 years before she died in 2009. He worked in sales in England after his cricket career ended.

Pritchard retired to New Zealand and lived in Levin from 1986 until his death. A biography, Tom Pritchard: Greatness Denied by Paul Williams, was published in 2013. His grandson, David Meiring, has played first-class cricket for Central Districts.

In March 2017 Pritchard became the third New Zealand first-class cricketer, after John Wheatley and Syd Ward, to reach 100 years of age. He died in Levin on 22 August 2017. At the time of his death, he was New Zealand's oldest living first-class cricketer; that honour then passed to Alan Burgess.
