= Thomas Burgess (umpire) =

New Zealand cricket umpire

Personal information
- Full name: Thomas Wills Burgess
- Born: 26 September 1888; Blackburn, England
- Died: 26 May 1974 (aged 85); Christchurch, New Zealand
- Relatives: Alan Burgess (son)

Umpiring information
- Tests umpired: 1 (1933)
- Source: Cricinfo, 1 July 2013

Thomas Wills Burgess (26 September 1888 – 26 May 1974) was a New Zealand cricket umpire. He stood in one Test match, New Zealand against England in 1933.

He umpired 20 first-class matches in Christchurch and one in Wellington between 1928 and 1947. His son Alan played first-class cricket for Canterbury from 1940 to 1952.

== See also ==
- List of Test cricket umpires
- English cricket team in New Zealand in 1932–33
