= Fred Susskind =

South African cricketer (1891–1957)

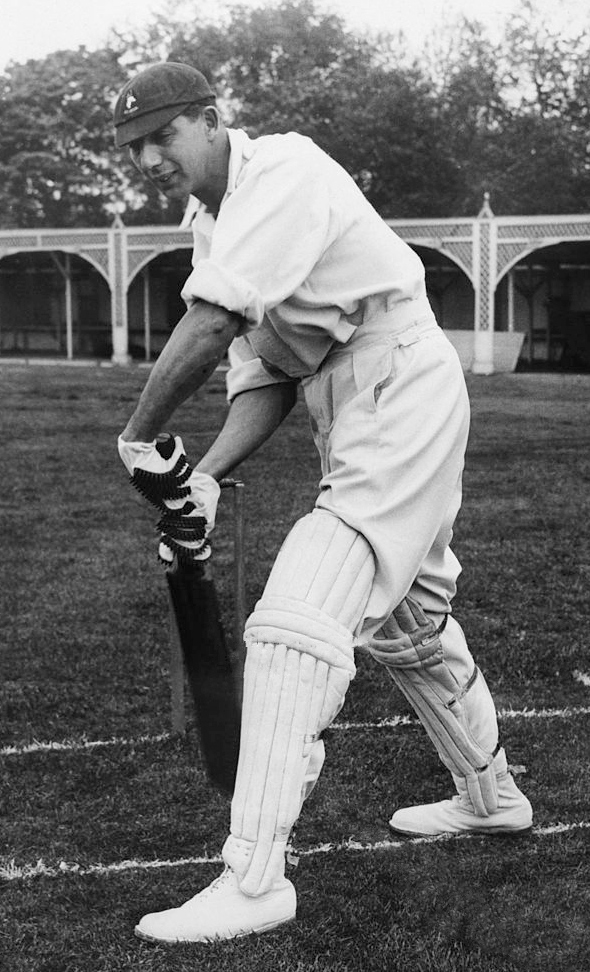
- Susskind in 1924

Personal information
- Born: 8 June 1891; Johannesburg, South Africa
- Died: 9 July 1957 (aged 66); Johannesburg, South Africa
- Batting: Right-handed

International information
- National side: South Africa
- Test debut: 14 June 1924 v England
- Last Test: 16 August 1924 v England

Career statistics
Competition	Test	First-class
Matches	5	97
Runs scored	268	4,775
Batting average	33.50	34.60
100s/50s	0/4	11/23
Top score	65	171
Balls bowled	–	78
Wickets	–	1
Bowling average	–	81.00
5 wickets in innings	–	0
10 wickets in match	–	0
Best bowling	–	1/13
Catches/stumpings	1/–	85/3
- Source: Cricinfo, 14 November 2022

Manfred Julius Susskind (8 June 1891 – 9 July 1957) was a South African cricketer who played in five Test matches in 1924. The first Jewish Test cricketer, he was born and died in Johannesburg, South Africa.

== Early cricket in England ==
Born in the South African Republic but educated in England at University College School and Cambridge University, Fred Susskind appeared in first-class cricket for Middlesex and Cambridge University as a right-handed middle-order batsman between 1909 and 1912 before returning to live in South Africa. He had little success in 16 matches in English cricket, with his only innings of more than 50 coming in his first game for Cambridge, when he scored 92 in the match against Surrey in 1910. He did not win a Blue for cricket during his time at Cambridge.

== South African cricket ==
Returning to South Africa, Susskind went into business: at his death in 1957 he was reported as having been a member of the Johannesburg Stock Exchange for more than 30 years. He also began playing cricket for Transvaal, and though not usually able to turn out for more than half the matches, he was successful for almost 20 years, and did not make his final appearance until the 1936–37 season. He hit his first century for Transvaal in his first season with the side, an innings of 136 against Eastern Province. Though war and irregular appearances over the next 10 years meant that this start was not followed up on, Susskind finally played a consecutive sequence of matches in the 1923–24 season and in one of these, against Border, he scored 171, which would be the highest of his career. That led to his selection for the trial match for the 1924 tour of England and with scores of 69 and 11 in the match, he gained a place in the touring party.

== Test cricket in England ==
The 1924 South African tour of England was not successful in terms of winning Tests, with the five-match series lost 3–0 and the other two games ruined by rain. Susskind, however, did well if unspectacularly, playing in all five Tests and making four scores of more than 50. His style, however, attracted criticism. "Though he scored so well, he did not command much admiration," wrote Wisden Cricketers' Almanack in its review of the tour. It went on:

Considering his advantages in height and reach, he nearly always seemed cramped in style, only on rare occasions venturing to let himself go, and no one in the team was so constantly open to the charge of playing with his legs. This was especially noticeable when he was trying to save the Test match at Lord's, appeal after appeal against him for leg before wicket being made before at last the umpire gave him out.

Susskind was omitted from the team for the first few matches, but when he finally appeared in the game against Gloucestershire towards the end of May, he made an unbeaten 69 and from then on he was the regular No 3 batsman in the side. In some matches, he also kept wicket, the South Africans having brought only one full-time wicketkeeper, Tommy Ward.

The Test series started disastrously for the South Africans, bundled out for just 30 in their first innings at Edgbaston by Arthur Gilligan and Maurice Tate. Having become the first Jewish Test cricketer, Susskind made 3 in his first Test innings, the only player to be dismissed with the assistance of a fielder, but improved on that with 51 in the second innings when South Africa totalled 390 but still lost by an innings. There was no such disaster in the second Test at Lord's, but the result was the same – an England victory by an innings, this time with the loss of only two wickets in the England innings. After the South Africans lost three wickets for 17 runs in the first innings, Susskind, with 64, put on 112 with Bob Catterall, who made 120, and in the second innings his 53 was the top score. Wisden noted that Susskind displayed "endless patience, staying at the wickets for over two hours and a half". The third Test was marginally less one-sided – South Africa followed on and lost by nine wickets – and Susskind was less successful personally, making 4 and 23. He failed again in the fourth match at Manchester, scoring just 5, but the match was restricted by rain to just two and three-quarters hours on the first day. The fifth and final Test at The Oval was also affected by rain and the first innings were not completed in a drawn match. Susskind made 65, his highest Test score and Wisden noted that he was "patience personified", and contrasted his "steadiness" to Catterall's "brilliancy": Susskind "took three hours and forty minutes to get his invaluable 65," it said.

In the other first-class matches on the tour, Susskind had an unspectacular record, scoring steadily across the summer but not making headlines until the tour was almost over. Then, in late matches, he hit 137 in the match against Surrey between the fourth and fifth Tests. And in a festival match at the end of the season between a team representing the South of England and the South Africans, he hit a second century, making 101 in 130 minutes. On the tour as a whole, he scored 1413 runs at an average of 33.63. The season in England also brought him the only three stumpings of his career and his only first-class wicket, Freddie Calthorpe in the match against Warwickshire.

== Back to South Africa ==
Susskind continued to play first-class cricket for Transvaal fairly regularly for the next eight South African seasons, though in some years he appeared in very few games. He did not take part in any further representative cricket, and his best season was the 1931–32 season, when he was 40 and when many of the top South African players were on the tour to Australia and New Zealand. In that year, he scored four centuries and four other innings of between 50 and 99 in just seven matches, and he averaged 64.08 runs per innings in making 769 runs. That was pretty much his swansong, though he returned for two games in 1933–34 and for a final one in 1936–37, in which he scored 71 at the age of 45.

== Personal life ==
Susskind married Marguerite Dorothy Whittome in St Augustine's Church, Johannesburg, on 14 February 1917. He worked as a stockbroker at the Johannesburg Stock Exchange, where he died suddenly of a coronary thrombosis on 9 July 1957.

== Honours ==
In 2024, at the South African Jewish Board of Deputies' 120th anniversary gala dinner, he was honoured among 100 remarkable Jewish South Africans who have contributed to South Africa. The ceremony included speeches from Chief Rabbi Ephraim Mirvis, and Susskind was honoured among other cricket figures such as Ali Bacher, Norman Gordon, Mandy Yachad and Dennis Gamsy.

== See also ==
- List of Jewish cricketers
