= Raghunath Chandorkar =

Indian cricketer (1920–2021)

Personal information
- Born: 21 November 1920; Karjat, Maharashtra, British Raj
- Died: 3 September 2021 (aged 100); Ambarnath, Maharashtra, India
- Batting: Right-handed
- Role: Wicket-keeper
- Source: Cricinfo, 19 November 2020

Raghunath Chandorkar (21 November 1920 – 3 September 2021) was an Indian cricketer who played in seven first-class matches between 1943 and 1951. He celebrated his 100th birthday in November 2020, becoming India's oldest living first-class cricketer. From the death of Alan Burgess in January 2021 until his own death Chandorkar was the world's oldest living first-class cricketer.

== See also ==
- Lists of oldest cricketers
- List of centenarians (sportspeople)

Preceded by Alan Burgess	Oldest Living First-Class Cricketer; 6 January 2021 – 3 September 2021	Succeeded by Rusi Cooper
