= HMS Vivien =

Destroyer of the Royal Navy

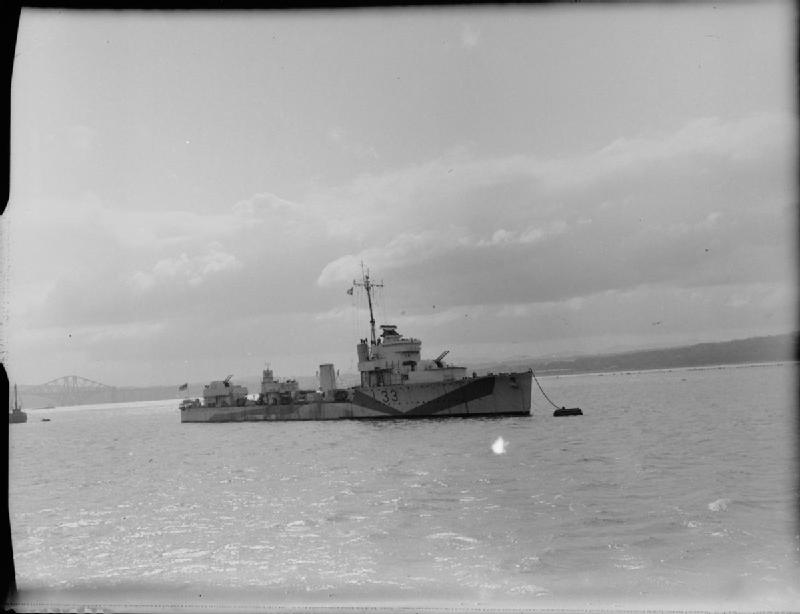
- HMS Vivien moored to a buoy during World War II.

History

United Kingdom
- Name: HMS Vivien
- Ordered: 30 June 1916
- Builder: Yarrow Shipbuilders, Scotstoun, Glasgow
- Laid down: July 1916
- Launched: 16 February 1918
- Completed: 28 May 1918
- Commissioned: 28 May 1918
- Decommissioned: 1920s?
- Identification: Pennant number: G39 (June 1918); L33 (interwar)
- Recommissioned: September 1939
- Decommissioned: 1945
- Motto: Trust me in all
- Honours and awards: Battle honour for North Sea 1940–1945
- Fate: For disposal 1947; Sold for scrapping 18 February 1948
- Badge: A book with gold ornaments, encircled by a gold snake, on a black field

General characteristics
- Class & type: Admiralty V-class destroyer
- Displacement: 1,272-1,339 tons
- Length: 300 ft (91.4 m) o/a, 312 ft (95.1 m) p/p
- Beam: 26 ft 9 in (8.2 m)
- Draught: 9 ft (2.7 m) standard, 11 ft 3 in (3.4 m) deep
- Propulsion: 3 Yarrow type Water-tube boilers; Brown-Curtis steam turbines; 2 shafts, 27,000 shp (20,000 kW)
- Speed: 34 kn (63 km/h; 39 mph)
- Range: 320-370 tons oil, 3,500 nmi (6,500 km; 4,000 mi) at 15 kn (28 km/h; 17 mph)
- Complement: 110
- Armament: 4 × QF 4 in (102 mm) L/45 Mk.V guns, mount P Mk.I; 2 × QF 2 pdr Mk.II "pom-pom" (40 mm L/39) or; 1 × QF 12 pdr 20 cwt Mk.I (76 mm), mount HA Mk.II; 2 × twin tubes for 21 inch (533 mm) torpedoes

HMS Vivien (L33) was a V-class destroyer of the British Royal Navy that saw service in World War I and World War II.

== Construction and commissioning ==
Vivien, the first Royal Navy ship of the name, was ordered on 30 June 1916 as part of the 9th Order of the 1916–17 Naval Programme. She was laid down in July 1916 by Yarrow Shipbuilders at Scotstoun, Glasgow, Scotland, and launched on 16 February 1918. She was completed on 28 May 1918 and commissioned into service the same day. She was assigned the pennant number G39 in June 1918; this was changed to L33 during the interwar period.

== Service history ==
=== World War I ===
All V- and W-class destroyers, Vivien among them, were assigned to the Grand Fleet or Harwich Force. Vivien saw service in the last year of World War I and in 1919 served in the Baltic during the Russian Intervention.

=== Interwar years ===
As the result of a reorganization of Royal Navy destroyer flotillas in 1921, Vivien became part of the 9th Destroyer Flotilla along with the destroyer leaders Douglas, Valentine, and Valkyrie and the destroyers Vanessa, Venturous, Verdun, Vesper, and Whitley. The entire flotilla was transferred to the Reserve Fleet on 4 April 1922 and laid up at Rosyth, Scotland, with reduced crews, but it was recommissioned on 8 April 1925 and renumbered as the 7th Destroyer Flotilla.

In December 1938, Vivien entered Chatham Dockyard for conversion into an antiaircraft escort.

=== World War II ===
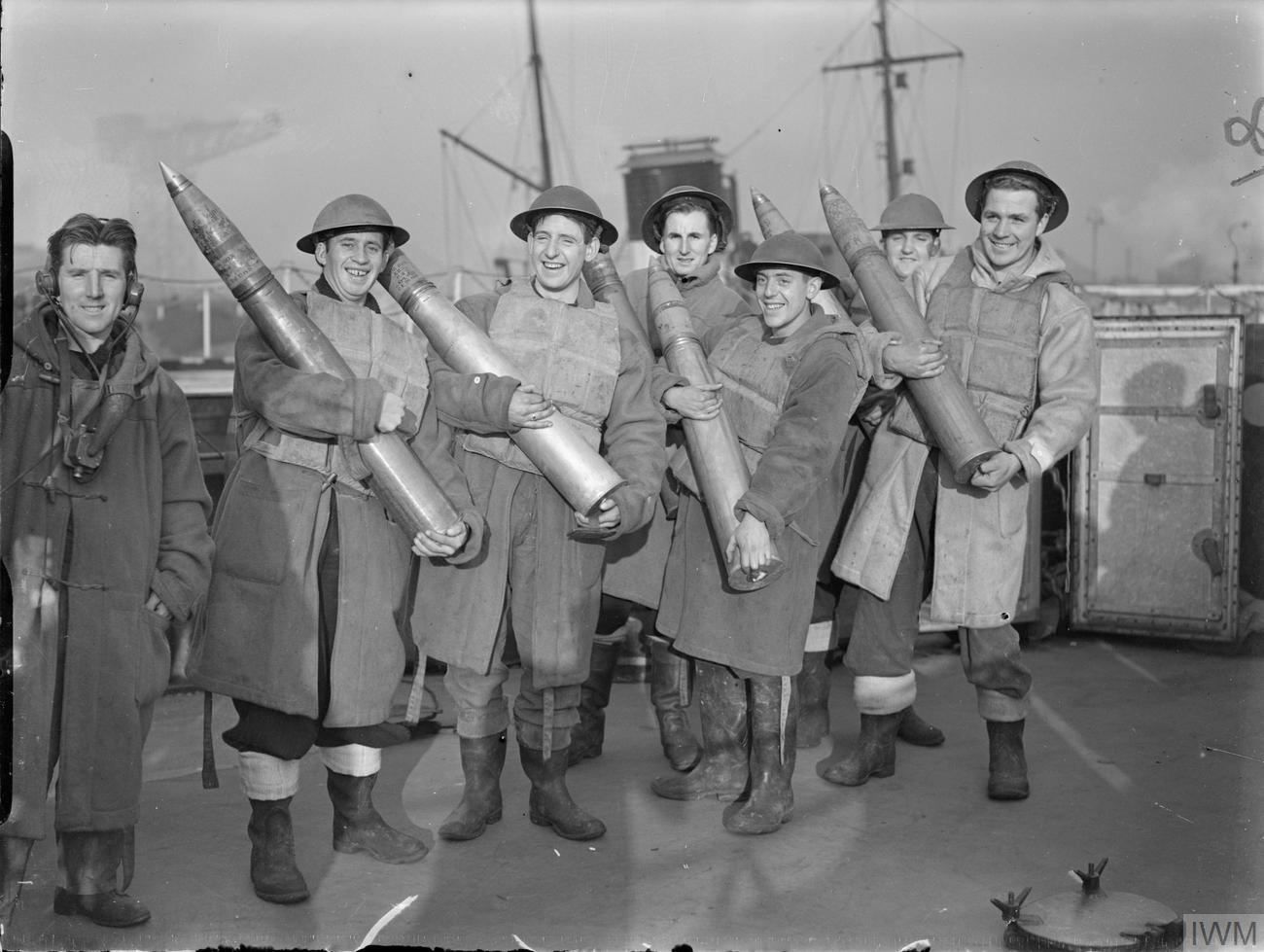
Gunners aboard HMS Vivien pose in November 1940 with 4-inch (102 mm) shells like the ones they had used to shoot down one German aircraft and damage another while defending a British convoy on 11 November 1940.

The United Kingdom entered World War II in September 1939. That month, Vivien recommissioned for post-conversion acceptance trials. After completing them on 25 October 1939, she steamed to Rosyth to finish her work-ups, and in November 1939 entered service there as an escort for convoys in the North Sea.

On 10 April 1940, Vivien was part of the escort of Convoy ON 25, which had departed Rosyth the previous evening bound for Norway, when she detected a possible submarine and depth-charged it; she also assisted that day in driving off attacks by German Heinkel He 111 bombers and investigated the wreckage of an He 111 shot down by Royal Air Force fighters which crashed 1.5 nautical miles (2.75 km) from her. She did not take part in any of the operations related to the evacuation of Allied personnel from the Netherlands, Belgium, and France in May and June 1940. On 10 June 1940 she was part of the escort for the first convoy along the east coast of Great Britain to come under attack by German motor torpedo boats (S-boats, known to the Allies as "E-boats"). On 11 November 1940, her 4-inch (102-mm) guns shot down one German aircraft and damaged another that attacked a convoy she was escorting.

In December 1941, the civil community of Bromyard, Herefordshire, "adopted" Vivien in a Warship Week National Savings campaign. During 1942, Vivien had Type 285 fire control radar installed for her 4-inch (102-mm) guns. On 24 February 1943, she and the escort destroyer Eglinton were escorting Convoy FS 137 when they engaged German minelaying motor torpedo boats which attacked the convoy east-southeast of Great Yarmouth.

During 1944, Vivien was fitted with surface warning radar, as well as radio telephone equipment to improve her ability to cooperate with other ships and aircraft. She did not take part in any of the operations related to the Allied invasion of Normandy in the summer of 1944.

Vivien remained on North Sea convoy duty until the surrender of Germany in early May 1945.

== Decommissioning and disposal ==
Vivien was decommissioned in May 1945 and placed in reserve. She was placed on the disposal list in 1947 and was sold to BISCO on 18 February 1948 for scrapping by Metal Industries. She arrived at the shipbreaker's yard at Charlestown, Fife, Scotland. She arrived under tow at the shipbreaker's yard in April 1948.

== Bibliography ==
- Campbell, John (1985). Naval Weapons of World War II. Annapolis, Maryland: Naval Institute Press. ISBN 0-87021-459-4.
- Chesneau, Roger, ed. (1980). Conway's All the World's Fighting Ships 1922–1946. Greenwich, UK: Conway Maritime Press. ISBN 0-85177-146-7.
- Colledge, J. J.; Warlow, Ben (2006) [1969]. Ships of the Royal Navy: The Complete Record of All Fighting Ships of the Royal Navy from the 15th Century to the Present (3rd Rev ed.). London: Chatham Publishing. ISBN 978-1-86176-281-8. OCLC 67375475.
- Cocker, Maurice. Destroyers of the Royal Navy, 1893–1981. Ian Allan. ISBN 0-7110-1075-7.
- Friedman, Norman (2009). British Destroyers From Earliest Days to the Second World War. Annapolis, Maryland: Naval Institute Press. ISBN 978-1-59114-081-8.
- Gardiner, Robert & Gray, Randal, eds. (1985). Conway's All the World's Fighting Ships 1906–1921. Annapolis, Maryland: Naval Institute Press. ISBN 0-85177-245-5.
- Lenton, H. T. (1998). British & Empire Warships of the Second World War. Annapolis, Maryland: Naval Institute Press. ISBN 1-55750-048-7.
- March, Edgar J. (1966). British Destroyers: A History of Development, 1892–1953; Drawn by Admiralty Permission From Official Records & Returns, Ships' Covers & Building Plans. London: Seeley Service. OCLC 164893555.
- Preston, Antony (1971). 'V & W' Class Destroyers 1917–1945. London: Macdonald. OCLC 464542895.
- Raven, Alan & Roberts, John (1979). 'V' and 'W' Class Destroyers. Man o'War. Vol. 2. London: Arms & Armour. ISBN 0-85368-233-X.
- Rohwer, Jürgen (2005). Chronology of the War at Sea 1939–1945: The Naval History of World War Two (Third Revised ed.). Annapolis, Maryland: Naval Institute Press. ISBN 1-59114-119-2.
- Whinney, Bob (2000). The U-boat Peril: A Fight for Survival. Cassell. ISBN 0-304-35132-6.
- Whitley, M. J. (1988). Destroyers of World War 2. Annapolis, Maryland: Naval Institute Press. ISBN 0-87021-326-1.
- Winser, John de D. (1999). B.E.F. Ships Before, At and After Dunkirk. Gravesend, Kent: World Ship Society. ISBN 0-905617-91-6.
