= Errol Manners =

Rear-Admiral Sir Errol Manners KBE
- Born: 29 June 1883; Ilmasnugger, Tirhoot, India
- Died: 23 October 1953 (aged 70); Fareham, Hampshire, England
- Military career
- Allegiance: United Kingdom
- Branch: Royal Navy
- Service years: 1898–1935; 1939–1945
- Rank: Rear-Admiral
- Commands: HMS Suffolk (1933–35); HMS Delhi (1925–27); HMS Champion (1925)
- Conflicts: First World War; Dervish War; Second World War
- Awards: Knight Commander of the Order of the British Empire; Mentioned in Despatches (2); Order of Saint Anna, 3rd Class (Russia)

Rear-Admiral Sir Errol Manners, KBE (29 June 1883 – 23 October 1953) was a Royal Navy officer and author on theology and British Israelism. He completed fifty-two ocean convoys during the Second World War, including ONM 249 which consisted of 153 ships. He wrote segments of research in a lengthy book titled Bible Research published in 1946, which quickly became popular among proponents of British Israelism for its chapter titled "The Hebrew origin of English. Israelite heraldry in Anglo-Saxon countries".

Manners and his three sons, Rodney (1910-1988), Sherard (1920-1990) and John (1914–2020), all served as naval officers in the Second World War. His daughter Angela (1918–2021) served with the Women's Royal Naval Service in the war. John was lieutenant commander aboard HMS Viceroy when it sank the German submarine U-1274 on 16 April 1945. In 2018 his last surviving son John became the world's longest-lived first-class cricketer.
