= Madan Raiji =

Indian cricketer (1922–2010)

Personal information
- Full name: Madan Naisadrai Raiji
- Born: 7 April 1922; Baroda, Gujarat, India
- Died: 29 March 2010 (aged 87)
- Batting: Right-handed
- Bowling: Leg-spin
- Relatives: Vasant Raiji (brother)

Domestic team information
- Years: Team
- 1941/42–1948/49: Bombay
- 1941/42: Hindus

Career statistics
Competition	First-class
Matches	34
Runs scored	1131
Batting average	35.34
100s/50s	2/6
Top score	170
Balls bowled	5939
Wickets	89
Bowling average	33.44
5 wickets in innings	4
10 wickets in match	0
Best bowling	6/40
Catches/stumpings	36/–
- Source: CricketArchive, 6 August 2022

Madan Naisadrai Raiji (7 April 1922 – 29 March 2010) was an Indian cricketer who played first-class cricket, mostly for Bombay, from 1941 to 1950.

Raiji was a leg-spin bowler and batsman who batted at various positions in the order. In his maiden first-class season, aged 19, he took 5 for 54 in the second innings when the Hindus beat the Parsees in the final of the Bombay Pentangular in December 1941. He took his best first-class figures in 1946–47, when he took 6 for 40, as well as making 59, the highest score of the match, during the Bombay Festival Tournament.

His best season was 1947–48, when in six matches he took 26 wickets at an average of 24.30 and made 466 runs at an average of 51.77, including his highest score of 170 in the Ranji Trophy semi-final against Hyderabad, when he also took five wickets in Bombay's innings victory. Earlier in the season he had scored 130 in 145 minutes and taken 3 for 58 and 5 for 95 in Bombay's innings victory over Maharashtra.

Raiji took part in the highest-scoring first-class match of all time, the Ranji Trophy semi-final between Bombay and Maharashtra in 1948–49. Of the 2,376 runs in the match, which Bombay won, he made 27 and 75 batting at number nine, and took no wickets for 138 runs.

Raiji's older brother Vasant was also a first-class cricketer, before becoming a cricket writer and centenarian. The brothers made their first-class debut in the same match in the Ranji Trophy in November 1941.
