= Geoffrey Beck (cricketer) =

English cricketer (1918–2019)

Personal information
- Full name: Geoffrey Edward Beck
- Born: 16 June 1918; Wisbech, Cambridgeshire, England
- Died: 5 March 2019 (aged 100); Polegate, East Sussex, England
- Batting: Right-handed

Domestic team information
- Years: Team
- 1946: Oxford University
- 1951: Oxfordshire

Career statistics
Competition	First-class
Matches	3
Runs scored	72
Batting average	12.00
100s/50s	0/1
Top score	50
Balls bowled	0
Wickets	–
Bowling average	–
5 wickets in innings	–
10 wickets in match	–
Best bowling	–
Catches/stumpings	0/–
- Source: Cricinfo, 19 November 2018

Geoffrey Edward Beck (16 June 1918 – 5 March 2019) was an English first-class cricketer and Congregational minister.

== Education ==
Geoffrey Beck attended Whitgift School from 1928 to 1934, and later studied theology at Mansfield College, Oxford, from 1942 to 1946.

== Cricket ==
A middle-order batsman, Beck represented Oxford University at cricket, playing in the University Match in 1943 (when he top-scored) and 1945, both of which were one-day matches. When first-class cricket resumed after World War II he played three matches for Oxford, with a highest score of 50 against Surrey in his first match. He later played two matches for Oxfordshire in the Minor Counties Championship in 1951.

== Marriage and ministry ==
Beck married Joy Crookshank, a Cambridge graduate and fellow member of the Student Christian Movement, in 1946. He also began his career as a Congregational minister in 1946. He served as the minister at Eccleston, St Helens, from 1946 to 1950, at Summertown, Oxford, from 1950 to 1965, as Warden of the Chapel of Unity at Coventry Cathedral from 1965 to 1971, and as minister at the Central Free Church, Brighton, from 1971 to 1984.

== British-German relations ==
Beck was co-founder of the Adam von Trott Memorial Appeal Project in honour of the participant, a former student at Oxford, in the plot to assassinate Hitler in 1944. The appeal provides scholarships to German students to study at Mansfield College. In 2014 the German government awarded Beck the Cross of the Order of Merit for his work for British-German relations.

== Retirement and death ==
Beck lived in retirement in East Sussex, and died in March 2019 at the age of 100. His wife died in 2000; they had four children.

== See also ==
- Longest-lived first-class cricketers
