= John Manners (cricketer) =

English cricketer and naval officer (1914–2020)

- Manners during the 1940s
- Born: John Errol Manners; 25 September 1914; Exeter, Devon, England
- Died: 7 March 2020 (aged 105); Newbury, Berkshire, England
- Spouse: Mary Manners (m. 1940–1995: her death)
- Relatives: Errol Manners (father)
- Military career
- Allegiance: United Kingdom
- Branch: Royal Navy
- Service years: 1932–1958
- Rank: Lieutenant commander
- Commands: HMS Eskimo; HMS Fame; HMS Viceroy
- Conflicts: Second World War
- Awards: Distinguished Service Cross; Medal of Ushakov
- Cricket career

Cricket information
- Batting: Right-handed
- Bowling: Right-arm medium

Domestic team information
- Years: Team
- 1936–1948: Hampshire
- 1953: Marylebone Cricket Club

Career statistics
Competition	First-class
Matches	21
Runs scored	1,162
Batting average	31.40
100s/50s	4/3
Top score	147
Balls bowled	24
Wickets	0
Bowling average	–
5 wickets in innings	0
10 wickets in match	0
Best bowling	–
Catches/stumpings	9/–
- Source: John Manners at Cricinfo

John Errol Manners DSC (25 September 1914 – 7 March 2020) was an English first-class cricketer and Royal Navy officer. He served in the Second World War and held several commands, earning the Distinguished Service Cross for his role in the sinking of the German submarine U-1274 in April 1945 while commanding the destroyer HMS Viceroy.

As a first-class cricketer, Manners was a hard-hitting right-handed batsman and a right-arm medium pace bowler. He began his playing career with Hampshire in 1936, but found his availability limited due to his commitments as a naval officer. With his career further interrupted by the war, Manners returned to first-class cricket in 1947 after securing a shore-based position at Sandhurst. He played county cricket for Hampshire in 1947 and 1948, but played most of his first-class cricket after the war for the Combined Services cricket team. He scored over 1,000 runs in his first-class career, which included four centuries.

Following his retirement from the navy, Manners worked for 18 years as the bursar at Dauntsey's School in Wiltshire. He was also a photographer who contributed to Country Life, and he had an interest in traditional country crafts, on which he wrote several books. In September 2018 he became the longest-lived first-class cricketer, surpassing the previous record of 103 years and 344 days held by Jim Hutchinson.

== Early life ==
The son of the admiral and theologian Sir Errol Manners and his Australian wife, Florence Maud Harrison, John Errol Manners was born in Exeter on 25 September 1914. He was the middle of three brothers: Errol Rodney Manners (1910–1988) and Errol Adrian 'Sherard' Manners (1920–1990); there was also a sister, Angela (born 1918). He was descended from John Manners, 2nd Duke of Rutland.

Manners was educated at Ferndown School, before attending Britannia Royal Naval College as a cadet from the age of 13, following in a family tradition of studying in Dartmouth, Devon. His time as a cadet saw him visit the West Indies and appear for the college in the schools' match at Lord's in 1930. A year prior to attending Britannia, his mother died. Manners would later remark that she had been ill for most of his childhood and that he had few memories of her.

== Early naval and cricket career ==
Manners was appointed as a midshipman in the Royal Navy in September 1932, before being made an acting-sub-lieutenant in January 1935. In September of the same year, he was promoted to the rank in full. He played cricket for the United Services in 1935, against a strong Hampshire Club & Ground side, scoring 20 runs and taking four wickets. Manners served aboard the royal yacht Victoria and Albert at Portsmouth in 1936, though with King Edward unwilling to travel to Cowes, this left Manners with more shore time. He played for the Royal Navy as captain against the British Army cricket team in a two-day match at Lord's in July of that year, where he scored 23 and 47, impressing Christopher Heseltine, then president of Hampshire County Cricket Club, who recommended to Manners that he play for the county. He was allowed by the navy to play county cricket for Hampshire in August, making his debut in first-class cricket against Gloucestershire at the United Services Ground in the County Championship, scoring 81 runs in his first innings before he was dismissed by Reg Sinfield and thus falling short of becoming the first Hampshire batsman to make a century on first-class debut. In the fortnight following this match, he made four further first-class appearances, scoring 212 runs at an average of 35.33. He headed Hampshire's batting averages in 1936 and impressed future Test Match Special commentator John Arlott, with Arlott commenting, "no player in Hampshire’s modern history was more intriguing", and went on to remark "not only was he potentially prolific, but his strokeplay was brilliant". Others suggested he had the technique for Test cricket.

As an amateur, his cricket after 1936 was heavily curtailed by his commitments with the navy. His status as an amateur afforded Manners the freedom to largely choose who he wanted to play for, enjoying a distinguished public life and lashings of top-class cricket, enabling him to play exhibition matches at venues such as Stansted Park, often followed by black-tie dinners with leading cricketers of the day. In December 1937, he was promoted to lieutenant, with seniority antedated to July of that year. From 1937, he served aboard torpedo boats in the Mediterranean and the Far East. Manners was admitted to the Marylebone Cricket Club (MCC) in 1937, after the club waived their usual membership qualification rules to admit him after recognising it was hard for him to play county cricket whilst serving overseas in Madras. Prior to the United Kingdom's declaration of war on Germany in September 1939, Manners had been saving his leave in order to have a full summer playing for Hampshire in 1940, but the subsequent declaration would mean it would be more than ten years before he played first-class cricket again, having last played in 1936.

== Second World War service ==
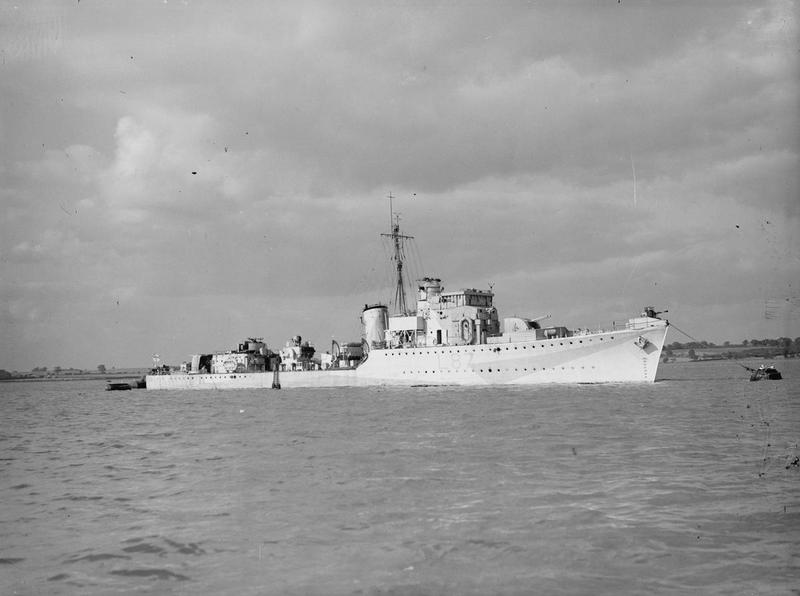
Manners was assigned to the under-construction HMS Eglinton in 1940.

Prior to war being declared, Manners was serving as a watch-keeping officer aboard HMS Birmingham at China Station in Hong Kong. With war looking likely Birmingham sailed for Singapore, where she patrolled the Sunda Strait When war was declared, Birmingham left for Japan, but did not enter its territorial waters. Manners was recalled to Britain in December 1939 aboard HMS Falmouth and the troopship SS Strathallan.

Returning to Southampton in early January 1940, Manners spent a month on leave at the family home at Alverstoke, before being assigned to the destroyer HMS Eglinton which was under construction at the Walker Yard on the Tyne in Newcastle. Manners was not one of the officers based at Newcastle to be sent to assist with the Dunkirk evacuation and spent the summer escorting convoys down the east coast following the Eglinton's commissioning. While at Newcastle, he met Mary Downes (1917–1995), an actress with the Newcastle Repertory Company. The couple married in October 1940 at Marylebone and narrowly avoided being killed on their wedding night when a German bomb hit the Hyde Park Hotel when they were in its restaurant, but failed to detonate. In the same month, Eglinton was chosen to take part in Operation Lucid, a plan to use fire ships to attack German invasion barges in ports in German-occupied northern France, however while escorting an oil tanker to Boulogne the command ship HMS Hambledon struck an acoustic mine, resulting in the cancellation of the operation.

Six months later, with Eglinton based at Harwich, Manners and his wife again avoided death under similar circumstances, when their rented house was hit by a bomb while they were in the bathroom; although they were unscathed, four other occupants of the house were killed. Manners served as a lieutenant aboard Eglinton until February 1942, after which he held a brief command aboard HMS Fame which was being repaired at Chatham. After a few weeks commanding Fame, Manners was sent to HMS Eskimo at Falmouth, after her first lieutenant, Edward Peregrine Stuart Russell had fallen overboard and drowned. He served aboard Eskimo in Operation Harpoon during the siege of Malta in June 1942, subsequently seeing action in the relief of Malta, for which he was later mentioned in dispatches. In September 1942, Eskimo formed part of Convoy PQ 18 escorting supply ships in the Arctic on their way to the Soviet Union, before returning to the Mediterranean to take part in the Operation Torch landings. Manners was made commanding officer of Eskimo in May 1943, and the ship took part in the Allied invasion of Sicily in July 1943, during which she was bombed and severely damaged.

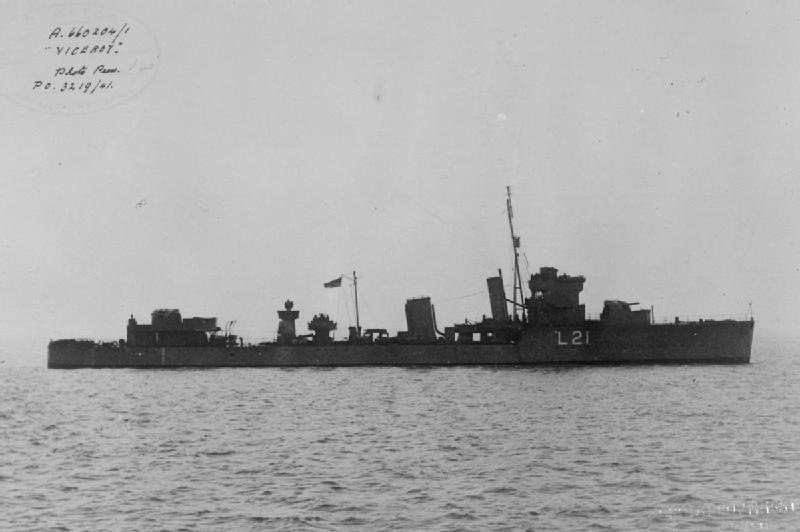
Manners was commanding officer aboard HMS Viceroy from 1943 to 1945.

He took command of the destroyer HMS Viceroy in December 1943, while she was being refitted at Jarrow. After a few weeks aboard Viceroy, Manners was seconded to HMS Watchman at Derry, after her captain had fallen ill and an officer with experience was required to replace him. He returned to command Viceroy after six weeks, with the destroyer joining the Rosyth Escort Force on anti-aircraft and anti-E-boat duties escorting convoys in the North Sea which were carrying supplies from the Firth of Forth to London. Viceroy was escorting a convoy on 11 April 1945, when the tanker SS Athelduke which was carrying 12,600 long tons (12,800 t) of molasses was hit by a torpedo from the German submarine U-1274 near the Farne Islands, causing two detonations to rock the ship. The water being too deep for mines made the cause of the explosions a submarine's torpedoes: realising the convoy was under attack from a U-boat, he turned the ship to port and took off in pursuit, obtaining a contact at 2,200 yards (1.3 miles). Manners commanded an urgent attack with depth charges set to "shallow", the detonation of which temporarily knocked out the electrics aboard Viceroy. Ten minutes later power was restored and a second attack on the U-boat was made, which brought oil to the surface. Reckoning that the U-boat had been sunk at a depth of 250 metres (820 ft), a third depth-charge set to "deep" caused a prolonged detonation and brought more oil to the surface. He proceeded to deploy a marker buoy and set off to catch up with the remainder of the convoy.

Two weeks passed with no confirmation of the kill. This led Manners, aboard Viceroy, and another officer, aboard HMS Vivien to return to the scene of the sinking. Once there, the kill was confirmed by further exploratory charges which were dropped and bought to the surface wreckage, documents, and a grey cylinder containing 72 bottles of brandy made in Heilbronn. One of the recovered bottles was sent by a Captain Ruck-Keene to Winston Churchill in a wooden casket made by Viceroy's carpenter, for which Churchill conveyed his thanks and congratulations in a letter to those who had taken part in the successful attack; U-1274 was to be the last German U-boat to be sunk by a surface ship during the war. His actions in the sinking saw him mentioned in dispatches and awarded the Distinguished Service Cross (DSC) for gallantry, determination and skill. His younger brother, Sherard, also served in the Royal Navy during the war and was awarded the DSC on the same page of the London Gazette for actions undertaken aboard HMS Bedouin whilst escorting a convoy to Malta. As the war neared its conclusion, Manners took part in Operation Conan, the Royal Navy's contribution to the liberation of Norway following the formal German surrender at Oslo in May 1945. He was the British naval officer in charge in Trondheim, where he received the German surrender and entertained Crown Prince Olav aboard Viceroy. Having been an acting lieutenant commander since May 1945, he achieved the war-substantive rank in July 1945.

== Later career and return to cricket ==
Upon leaving Viceroy in July 1945, Manners was assigned to the troop ship RMS Otranto for its voyage to Australia, where he was to be loaned to the Royal Australian Navy. When the ship arrived in Australia, which was the birthplace of his mother, it docked at Melbourne and shortly thereafter Manners sailed for Sydney; Manners described his stay there as one of the dullest periods of his life. With no prospect of being assigned aboard a ship, he flew back to Melbourne aboard a Royal Air Force Dakota, where his uncle found him work at a sheep station in the Western District of Victoria. After a fortnight at the sheep station, Manners received a phonecall and was assigned to HMS King George V in October 1945. The ship spent the majority of the next two months in dry dock at Sydney, during which Manners entertained himself by playing in cricket matches involving Sydney's leading public schools, including Cranbrook School whose headmaster was the Oxford Blue Brian Hone. He remained aboard King George V until May 1946.

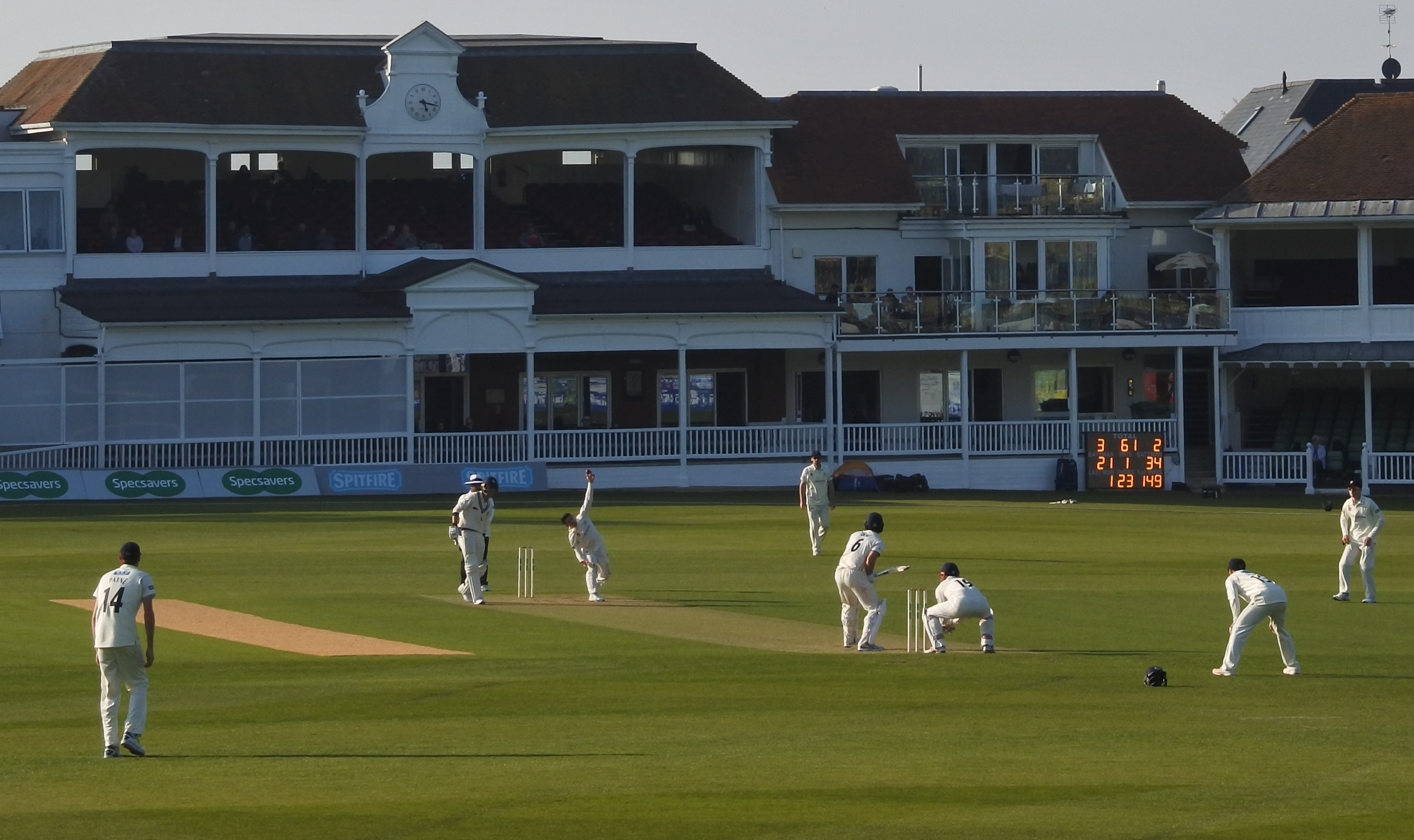
Manners scored his maiden first-class century in 1947 for Hampshire against Kent at the St Lawrence Ground (pictured in 2017).

Returning to England, he was appointed the naval liaison officer at Sandhurst, which allowed him to resume playing for Hampshire. He played his first first-class match since 1936, for the Combined Services cricket team against Gloucestershire at Bristol in 1947. His first match back for Hampshire saw him score his maiden first-class century with 121 at almost a run a ball against Kent at Canterbury. Wisden described the innings as "perfect stroke play, drives, cuts and hooks". He played three further first-class matches for Hampshire in the 1948 County Championship, in addition to playing for the Combined Services against Hampshire and Gloucestershire in that same year. Against Gloucestershire, he recorded what would be his highest first-class score of 147. His commitments as an officer still limited his availability for Hampshire; he did not play for the county after 1948, although he did make twelve further first-class appearances for the Combined Services until 1953. He made 123 against the touring New Zealanders at Gillingham in 1949, and scored 75 against the touring South Africans in 1950. Manners also appeared for the MCC and the Free Foresters in a first-class match apiece in 1953.

He returned to sea in 1953, ending his first-class playing days, before retiring from the navy with the rank of lieutenant commander in April 1958 to become the bursar at Dauntsey's School in Wiltshire. His time at Dauntsey's was not without controversy, when in 1964 he was temporarily suspended after pupils organised a strike to protest the food they were being served. However, he was reinstated after a week following a letter of support, signed by all but one of the teaching staff. He retired after eighteen years at Dauntsey's. In Wiltshire, he played club cricket for Wiltshire Queries Cricket Club, whom he would play for into his sixties. His club cap, and one presented to him by Wiltshire County Cricket Club, are held in the MCC collection.

Manners was also a photographer who contributed to Country Life. He had an interest in crafts, and was the author of the books Country Crafts Today (1974), Country Crafts in Pictures (1976), Crafts of the Highlands and Islands (1978), and Irish Crafts and Craftsmen (1982). His collection of rural photographs and his research files are held at the Museum of English Rural Life at the University of Reading. Manners also donated his wartime photography collection to the National Maritime Museum.

== Later life and death ==
His wife, with whom he had a son and two daughters, died in April 1995. His memoirs dating from 1938 to 1946 were published in 2010, whilst some of his private papers are archived at the Imperial War Museum. Manners was invited to the Russian Embassy in London in 2014, where he was decorated with the Medal of Ushakov for his service in the Arctic convoys. In September 2017, at the age of 103, Manners took part in the ITV documentary 100 Year Old Driving School, but gave up driving after his appearance. The documentary also featured the England women's cricketer Eileen Whelan, at the time the oldest living women's Test cricketer. Shortly after this he suffered a fall and injured his shoulder, which stopped him from visiting his daughter, Diana, who had emigrated to Australia and whom Manners would visit each Christmas. In September 2018, he became the longest-lived first-class cricketer, surpassing Jim Hutchinson's (1896–2000) record of 103 years and 344 days. Paying tribute, Hampshire chairman Rod Bransgrove said: "Everyone involved in Hampshire Cricket, past and present, salutes John Manners for his terrific innings and hopes that he holds the record as the oldest living first-class cricketer for a very long time."

In November 2019, Manners was presented with a commemorative medal by the Norwegian Defence Attaché John Andreas Olsen for his role as British naval officer in charge of Trondheim during the German surrender in 1945. Manners died on 7 March 2020 at the age of 105 at a nursing home in Newbury, Berkshire. His funeral service was held eleven days after his death at St Lawrence's Parish Church in Hungerford.

== See also ==
- List of centenarians (sportspeople)
- Lists of oldest cricketers

== Works cited ==
- Manners, John Errol (2010). Yardley-Latham, T. (ed.). Lt. Cdr. John Manners Memoirs 1938–1946. Royal Navy History. ISBN 9780557268092.

Preceded by Norman Gordon	Oldest living first-class cricketer 3 September 2014 – 7 March 2020	Succeeded by Vasant Raiji
