= Norman Gordon =

South African cricketer (1911–2014)

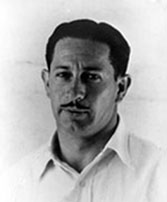

Personal information
- Full name: Norman Gordon
- Born: 6 August 1911; Boksburg, Transvaal, South Africa
- Died: 2 September 2014 (aged 103); Hillbrow, Johannesburg, Gauteng, South Africa
- Batting: Right-handed
- Bowling: Right-arm fast
- Role: Bowler

International information
- National side: South Africa
- Test debut (cap 151): 24 December 1938 v England
- Last Test: 14 March 1939 v England

Domestic team information
- Years: Team
- 1933–1948: Transvaal

Career statistics
Competition	Test	First-class
Matches	5	29
Runs scored	8	109
Batting average	2.00	5.19
100s/50s	0/0	0/0
Top score	7*	20
Balls bowled	1,966	7,173
Wickets	20	126
Bowling average	40.35	22.24
5 wickets in innings	2	8
10 wickets in match	0	0
Best bowling	5/103	6/61
Catches/stumpings	1/–	8/–
- Source: CricketArchive, 22 August 2009

Norman Gordon (6 August 1911 – 2 September 2014) was a South African cricketer who played in five Test matches during the 1938–39 South African cricket season.

He was born in Boksburg, Transvaal. He is the only male Test cricketer to live beyond 100 years of age. Gordon became the oldest-ever Test cricketer on 23 March 2011, when he surpassed New Zealander Eric Tindill, who died on 1 August 2010, at age 99.

== Early life ==
Gordon was born to Jewish parents in Boksburg, Transvaal. The family later moved to Kensington and Gordon attended Jeppe High School for Boys.

== Cricket career ==
Gordon played first-class cricket for Transvaal from the 1933–34 season as a right-handed fast bowler and a tail-end right-handed batsman.

He made his Test debut against England in December 1938, playing every Test of the five-match series. In the first Test, he took his best Test match figures of 7–162, including 5–103 in the first innings. He was stumped by Les Ames off the bowling of Tom Goddard for a first-ball duck in the drawn match. In the second match he took 5–157 in England's only innings, but was again stumped by Ames off the bowling of Goddard for 0 in another drawn match.

In the third match, Gordon took 2–127 in England's only innings and was out for 1 and 0, falling to Ken Farnes and Hedley Verity as England won by an innings and 13 runs. In the fourth match, he took 2–47 and 3–58 but did not bat in the drawn Test. In the final Test Gordon took match figures of 1–256 and was not out in each innings, scoring 0 and 7. This match was the famous Timeless Test, which took 10 days and was eventually declared a draw by agreement between the teams. It was Gordon's final Test match.

He took his best innings figures of 6–61, followed by 3–86 in the second innings, for Transvaal against Natal at Johannesburg in 1939–40. He continued playing for Transvaal until the 1948–49 season.

== Later life ==
Gordon ran a sports shop in central Johannesburg. He was the last living male to have played Test cricket before World War II. He turned 100 in August 2011 and lived in central Johannesburg. Following his death, he was succeeded as the oldest living first-class cricketer by John Manners.

== Personal life ==
In 1941, he married Mercy, whom he had met at school. They remained married until Mercy's death in 2001. They had a son together.

== Honours ==
In 2024, at the South African Jewish Board of Deputies' 120th anniversary gala dinner, he was honoured among 100 remarkable Jewish South Africans who have contributed to South Africa. The ceremony included speeches from Chief Rabbi Ephraim Mirvis, and Gordon was honoured among other cricket figures such as Ali Bacher, Dennis Gamsy, Mandy Yachad and Fred Susskind.

== See also ==
- List of select Jewish cricketers
- List of oldest Test cricketers
- List of centenarians in sport
- List of South Africa cricketers who have taken five-wicket hauls on Test debut

Records
Preceded by Eric Tindill	Oldest living Test cricketer 1 August 2010 – 2 September 2014	Succeeded by Lindsay Tuckett
Preceded by Cyril Perkins	Oldest living first-class cricketer 22 November 2013 – 2 September 2014	Succeeded by John Manners
