= Alan Burgess (cricketer) =

New Zealand cricketer (1920–2021)

Personal information
- Full name: Alan Thomas Burgess
- Born: 1 May 1920; Christchurch, New Zealand
- Died: 6 January 2021 (aged 100); Rangiora, New Zealand
- Batting: Right-handed
- Bowling: Slow left-arm orthodox
- Relatives: Thomas Burgess (father); Gordon Burgess (cousin)

Domestic team information
- Years: Team
- 1940/41–1951/52: Canterbury

Career statistics
Competition	First-class
Matches	14
Runs scored	466
Batting average	22.19
100s/50s	0/2
Top score	61*
Balls bowled	1,139
Wickets	16
Bowling average	30.68
5 wickets in innings	1
10 wickets in match	0
Best bowling	6/52
Catches/stumpings	12/–
- Source: CricketArchive, 5 January 2020

Alan Thomas Burgess (1 May 1920 – 6 January 2021) was a New Zealand cricketer who played first-class cricket for Canterbury from 1940 to 1952. He was a tank driver in World War II. From June 2020 to January 2021, Burgess was the world's oldest living first-class cricketer.

== Life and career ==
Alan Burgess's father Thomas was a cricket umpire who stood in a Test match in Christchurch in 1933. Alan's cousin was Gordon Burgess, a cricketer and administrator whose son Mark captained the New Zealand Test team in the 1970s.

Burgess attended Phillipstown School in Christchurch before becoming an apprentice upholsterer. In his first first-class match in December 1940 Burgess played as a bowler, taking 6 for 52 and 3 for 51 with his left-arm spin against Otago. Later that season he batted as high as number seven, scoring 61 not out against Wellington.

He joined the New Zealand Army when he turned 21 in 1941, and was soon posted overseas. He served in Egypt and Italy as a tank driver in the 20th Armoured Regiment. He fought in the Battle of Monte Cassino in 1944. After the war ended in Europe he toured England with the New Zealand Services team from July to September 1945, playing as a batsman. He made another score of 61 not out in the only first-class match.

In nine matches for Canterbury between 1945–46 and 1951–52, Burgess's top score was 42 against Auckland in 1950–51, when he put on 105 for the first wicket with Ray Emery.

Burgess ran his own upholstery business in Christchurch. He was married twice, and had three children. He lived in Rangiora. He became New Zealand's oldest living first-class cricketer when Tom Pritchard died in August 2017.

Burgess celebrated his 100th birthday in May 2020. On 13 June 2020, following the death of Vasant Raiji, Burgess became the oldest living first-class cricketer. He died in Rangiora on 6 January 2021 at the age of 100. Following Burgess' death, India's Raghunath Chandorkar became the oldest living first-class cricketer, and Iain Gallaway became New Zealand's oldest living first-class cricketer.

== See also ==
- Lists of oldest cricketers
- List of centenarians (sportspeople)

Preceded by Vasant Raiji	Oldest Living First-Class Cricketer; 13 June 2020 – 6 January 2021	Succeeded by Raghunath Chandorkar
