= Edward English =

English cricketer

Personal information
- Full name: Edward Apsey English
- Born: 1 January 1864; Dorking, Surrey, England
- Died: 5 September 1966 (aged 102); Tiverton, Devon, England
- Nickname: Ted
- Batting: Right-handed
- Bowling: Unknown

Domestic team information
- Years: Team
- 1898–1901: Hampshire

Career statistics
Competition	First-class
Matches	18
Runs scored	565
Batting average	18.33
100s/50s	–/2
Top score	98
Balls bowled	194
Wickets	1
Bowling average	101.00
5 wickets in innings	–
10 wickets in match	–
Best bowling	1/11
Catches/stumpings	5/–
- Source: Cricinfo, 23 January 2010

Edward Apsey English (1 January 1864 – 5 September 1966) was an English first-class cricketer.

English was born at Dorking in January 1864. He first came to cricketing prominence when he represented the young players of Surrey as a 19 year old. It would not be until 1898, at the age of 34, that English would make his debut in first-class cricket for Hampshire against Lancashire at Old Trafford in the County Championship. His first season saw him score what would be his highest first-class score, 98 against Surrey on a difficult wicket at The Oval; his 98 formed part of a 164 runs partnership for the fifth wicket with Arthur Webb. English was notably dismissed off the last ball of the ball of the match by Tom Richardson while attempting to reach his century. He played first-class cricket for Hampshire until 1901, making a total of 18 appearances as an amateur. He scored 565 runs in total, at an average of 18.83.

He remained an active sportsman long after his first-class cricket career had finished, with him playing golf until 91; at the age of 82 he hit a hole-in-one at Alton Golf Club. He was resident at Alton, where he was a member of the Conservative Club and at the age of 93 he reached the final of the club's snooker competition. English was by profession a registrar at Alton for 36 years. He later retired to Higher Ball Farm near Tiverton in Devon, where he celebrated his 102nd birthday in January 1966. English died there in September 1966. At the time of his death he was the oldest surviving county cricketer and the oldest first-class cricketer in the world. He is one of four Hampshire players known to have lived to the age of 100, the others being George Deane, Neil McCorkell and John Manners.

Preceded by John Wheatley	Oldest living first-class cricketer 19 April 1962 – 5 September 1966	Unknown
