= David Meiring =

New Zealand cricketer and coach

Personal information
- Full name: David Thomas Meiring
- Born: 23 April 1986 (age 40); Worcester, England
- Batting: Right-handed
- Bowling: Right-arm medium
- Role: Batsman
- Relatives: Tom Pritchard (grandfather)

Domestic team information
- Years: Team
- 2013/14–2014/15: Central Districts

Career statistics
Competition	First-class	List A
Matches	2	3
Runs scored	45	58
Batting average	11.25	19.33
100s/50s	0/0	0/0
Top score	22	35
Catches/stumpings	4/–	1/–
- Source: Cricinfo, 14 September 2019

David Thomas Meiring (born 23 April 1986) is a former New Zealand cricketer who played first-class and List A cricket for Central Districts in 2014 and 2015. He is now a cricket coach.

Meiring was a batsman. As well as playing for Central Districts, he played Hawke Cup cricket for Manawatu from 2009–10 to 2016–17, which included two periods when Manawatu held the trophy. He also coached the team. He retired after the 2018–19 season, having scored 3919 runs in 88 matches for Manawatu. In September 2019 he was appointed a pathways coach for Central Districts and regularly acted as head coach for Central Districts A. He is the grandson of the New Zealand cricketer Tom Pritchard, who played for Manawatu in the 1930s.
