= Rupert de Smidt =

South African cricketer

Personal information
- Full name: Rupert de Smidt
- Born: 23 November 1883; Cape Town, Cape Province, South Africa
- Died: 3 August 1986 (aged 102); Cape Town, Cape Province, South Africa
- Batting: Right-handed
- Bowling: Leg break

Domestic team information
- Years: Team
- 1912/13: Western Province

Career statistics
| Competition | First-class |
|---|---|
| Matches | 4 |
| Runs scored | 74 |
| Batting average | 18.50 |
| 100s/50s | –/– |
| Top score | 42* |
| Balls bowled | 606 |
| Wickets | 16 |
| Bowling average | 18.00 |
| 5 wickets in innings | – |
| 10 wickets in match | – |
| Best bowling | 4/40 |
| Catches/stumpings | 6/– |
- Source: Cricinfo, 19 February 2024

Rupert de Smidt (23 November 1883 – 3 August 1986) was a South African cricketer who played first-class cricket for Western Province. He is the fifth oldest of the 23 first-class cricketers known to have surpassed 100 years of age.

Born in Cape Town, de Smidt played four matches for Western Province during the 1912/13 season. A leg break bowler he took 16 wickets at an average of 18.00, finishing his only first-class season as Western Province's leading wicket-taker. His best bowling figures of 4/40 came on his debut against Transvaal after he had taken 4/65 in the first innings.

De Smidt was a lower order batsman, batting at number eight in four of his five innings. He scored 74 runs at an average of 18.50, with a highest score of 42 not out against Orange Free State.

De Smidt died aged 102 years 253 days in Cape Town. His Wisden obituary stated he "was believed to be the oldest first-class cricketer". The record passed to Jim Hutchinson in August 1999.

== See also ==
- Lists of oldest cricketers
