= Charles Braithwaite (cricketer) =

English cricketer

Personal information
- Born: 10 September 1845; Obroke, England
- Died: 15 April 1946 (aged 100); Wayne, Pennsylvania, United States
- Source: Cricinfo, 2 August 2018

Charles Braithwaite (10 September 1845 – 15 April 1946) was an English cricketer. He played four first-class matches between 1881 and 1893, all of them in Philadelphia.

== See also ==
- Lists of oldest cricketers
- List of centenarians (sportspeople)
