= Dennis Gamsy =

South African cricketer (born 1940)

Personal information
- Born: 17 February 1940 (age 86); Glenwood, Natal, South Africa
- Batting: Right-handed
- Role: Wicketkeeper-batsman

International information
- National side: South Africa

Domestic team information
- Years: Team
- 1958-59 to 1972-73: Natal

Career statistics
Competition	Tests	First-class
Matches	2	93
Runs scored	39	3106
Batting average	19.50	23.70
100s/50s	0/0	2/18
Top score	30*	137
Balls bowled	–	7
Wickets	–	–
Bowling average	–	–
5 wickets in innings	–	–
10 wickets in match	–	–
Best bowling	–	–
Catches/stumpings	5/-	278/33
- Source: Cricinfo

Dennis Gamsy (born 17 February 1940 in Glenwood, Natal) is a former South African cricketer who played in two Tests as a wicketkeeper in 1970 against Australia.

He played for Natal from 1958–59 to 1972–73, and toured England with the South African team in 1965. In 1970 he became one of the first prominent South African cricketers to speak out in favour of mixed-race sport in South Africa. Shortly afterwards he founded the Cricket Club of South Africa, one of the country's first multi-racial teams.

== Honours ==
In 2024, at the South African Jewish Board of Deputies' 120th anniversary gala dinner, he was honoured among 100 remarkable Jewish South Africans who have contributed to South Africa. The ceremony included speeches from Chief Rabbi Ephraim Mirvis, and Gamsy was honoured among other cricket figures such as Ali Bacher, Norman Gordon, Mandy Yachad and Fred Susskind.

== See also ==
- List of select Jewish cricketers
