= Vasant Raiji =

Indian cricketer (1920–2020)

Personal information
- Full name: Vasant Naisadrai Raiji
- Born: 26 January 1920; Baroda, Baroda State, Indian Empire (Now Vadodara, Gujarat, India)
- Died: 13 June 2020 (aged 100); Walkeshwar, Mumbai, Maharashtra, India
- Batting: Right-handed
- Relatives: Madan Raiji (brother)

Domestic team information
- Years: Team
- 1941–42: Bombay
- 1944–45 to 1949–50: Baroda

Career statistics
Competition	First-class
Matches	9
Runs scored	277
Batting average	23.08
100s/50s	0/2
Top score	68
Balls bowled	36
Wickets	0
Bowling average	–
5 wickets in innings	–
10 wickets in match	–
Best bowling	–
Catches/stumpings	1/–
- Source: Cricket Archive, 28 January 2015

Vasant Naisadrai Raiji (26 January 1920 – 13 June 2020) was an Indian first-class cricketer and cricket historian. He featured in nine first class matches between 1939 and 1950.

== Life and career ==
Raiji was born in Baroda. Representing a Cricket Club of India team on his first-class debut in a festival match in 1939, he scored a duck in the first innings and just a single run in the second. In 1941-42 he opened the batting for Bombay in the Ranji Trophy, and was a reserve for the Hindus team in the 1941 Bombay Pentangular. He then moved to play for Baroda, and his two highest scores came in Baroda's victory over Maharashtra in the 1944-45 Ranji Trophy, when he made 68 and 53. His younger brother Madan also played first-class cricket for Bombay in the 1940s.

At the end of Raiji's playing career, he turned to writing, and wrote several important works on early Indian cricket. He was an accountant by profession and authored two books on the subject. In the 1930s he was one of the founding members of the Jolly Cricket Club in Bombay along with his friend Anandji Dossa, who was a renowned cricket statistician.

Towards the end of his life, Raiji lived in the Walkeshwar area of South Mumbai. On the death of B. K. Garudachar in February 2016 he became India's oldest first-class cricketer. He celebrated his 100th birthday in January 2020, attended by Steve Waugh, Sunil Gavaskar and Sachin Tendulkar. On 7 March 2020, he became the oldest living first-class cricketer following the death of John Manners.

Raiji was only the second Indian first-class cricketer known to have lived to 100, after D. B. Deodhar who was aged 101 when he died in 1993. Raiji died on 13 June 2020, aged 100, survived by his wife and their two daughters.

== Books ==
- Ranji: The Legend and the Man (1963)
- Duleep: The Man and His Game (co-edited; 1963)
- Victor Trumper: The Beau Ideal of a Cricketer (edited; 1964)
- Ranji: A Centenary Album (edited; 1972)
- L. P. Jai: Memories of a Great Batsman (edited; 1976)
- The Romance of the Ranji Trophy (1984)
- India's Hambledon Men (1986)
- CCI and the Brabourne Stadium, 1937-1987 (with Anandji Dossa; 1987)
- C. K. Nayudu: The Shahenshah of Indian Cricket (1989)
- Duleep: A Centenary Tribute (edited; 2005)
- Story of the Bombay Tournament, from Presidency to Pentangular, 1892–93 to 1945–46 (with Mohandas Menon; 2006)
- Cricket Memories: Men and Matches of Bygone Days (2010)

== See also ==
- Lists of oldest cricketers

Preceded by John Manners	Oldest Living First-Class Cricketer; 7 March 2020 – 13 June 2020	Succeeded by Alan Burgess
