= Frank Shipston =

English cricketer

Personal information
- Full name: Frank William Shipston
- Born: 29 July 1906; Bulwell, Nottinghamshire, England
- Died: 6 July 2005 (aged 98); Wollaton, Nottinghamshire, England
- Batting: Right-handed
- Bowling: Right-arm off-break
- Role: Batsman

Domestic team information
- Years: Team
- 1925–1933: Nottinghamshire

Umpiring information
- FC umpired: 27 (1956–1969)

Career statistics
Competition	First-class
Matches	49
Runs scored	1183
Batting average	18.48
100s/50s	2/4
Top score	118*
Catches/stumpings	13/-
- Source: CricketArchive, 7 December 2011

Frank William Shipston (29 July 1906 – 6 July 2005) was an English cricketer. Born in Bulwell, Nottinghamshire, Shipston's father (also Frank Shipston) had played several matches for the Nottinghamshire County Cricket Club in the Second XI Championship. Shipston made his first-class debut for Nottinghamshire against Glamorgan in the final round of the 1925 English cricket season, having previously only played at second XI level. Prior to debuting, he had worked as a miner in Yorkshire and at Langworth in Lincolnshire, as well as on Nottinghamshire's groundstaff. He was a regular player at county level until the end of the 1933 season, when he joined the Nottinghamshire Police at the urging of Captain Popkess, who wanted ex-professional cricketers to boost the police cricket team.

Overall, Shipston played 49 first-class matches, all for Nottinghamshire, scoring 1,183 runs at an average of 18.48. His highest first-class score, 118 not out, was achieved against Hampshire during the 1932 season, a match which Nottinghamshire won by an innings and 53 runs. Shipston was a close friend of Harold Larwood during his cricket career, with the two rooming together when Nottinghamshire played away from home. From the 1950s, Shipston occasionally umpired at county and second XI level, umpiring 24 first-class matches during the 1956 County Championship, and continuing to umpire into the 1970s. He also was employed by Nottinghamshire as a coach from 1957 to 1966. On the death of Harry Forsyth in July 2004, Shipston became the oldest living first-class cricketer, a position he held until his death in Wollaton in July 2005, when he was succeeded by Syd Ward.

Preceded by Harry Forsyth	Oldest living first-class cricketer 19 July 2004 – 6 July 2005	Succeeded by Syd Ward
