= Anandji Dossa =

Indian cricket statistician (1916–2014)

Anandji Jamnadas Dossa (September 15, 1916 – September 22, 2014, in New York City) was an Indian cricket statistician.

He represented his school and Wilson college in inter-school and inter-collegiate cricket while growing up in Bombay. He was an opening batsman and wicket keeper. In 1941, he was the 12th man for Hindus in the Bombay Pentangular and Bombay in the Ranji Trophy. Dossa got interested in cricket statistics while following the news of India in England in 1932. When West Indies played the Cricket Club of India at the Brabourne Stadium in 1958, Dossa was asked to assist the commentators as a scorer for a day. This started his career with All India Radio, and he remained associated with All India Radio as cricket statistician from 1956–57 to 1972–73.

He was the chairman of the Indian cricket board's statistical committee for a few years from 1973. When the Association of Indian Cricket Statisticians and Scorers (ACSSI) was formed in the 1980s, he served as its first President. The association's yearly award (Anandji Dossa Trophy) for the best scorer and the C. C. I. library at the Brabourne Stadium are named after him.

He was the author or several works:

- Statistics editor of 'The Indian Cricket Field Annual' from 1957/58 to 1964/65
- Editor of Cricket Quarterly from 1975
- Cricket ties India - Pakistan, 1978 (Indo-Pakistani Test cricketers of the 1950s)
- India v Australia 1979 (pre-tour)
- CCI & The Brabourne Stadium: 1937-1987 (with Vasant Raiji)
