= Archie Scott (cricketer) =

Scottish cricketer (1918–2019)

Personal information
- Full name: Andrew Archibald Steele Scott
- Born: 26 January 1918; Liberton, Midlothian, Scotland
- Died: 1 November 2019 (aged 101); Inverness, Scotland
- Batting: Right-handed

Domestic team information
- Years: Team
- 1947: Scotland

Career statistics
| Competition | First-class |
|---|---|
| Matches | 1 |
| Runs scored | 12 |
| Batting average | 6.00 |
| 100s/50s | –/– |
| Top score | 12 |
| Catches/stumpings | –/– |
- Source: Cricinfo, 5 November 2019

Andrew Archibald Steele Scott (26 January 1918 – 1 November 2019) was a Scottish first-class cricketer and was the oldest ever living Scottish first-class cricketer.

Scott was born in the Edinburgh suburb of Liberton on 26 January 1918. He was educated in England at Sedbergh School, attending from 1932 to 1937. Prior to the Second World War, Scott enlisted in the British Army as a second lieutenant in the 78th (Lowland) Field Regiment. He played for Scotland in one first-class cricket match against Ireland at Cork in 1947. Batting twice during the match, Scott was dismissed for 12 runs in Scotland's first-innings by Eddie Ingram, while in their second-innings he was dismissed by the same bowler without scoring. He later worked as a director of Scottish Malt Distillers.

He became the oldest living person to have played first-class cricket for Scotland in June 2009, following the death of Stan Sismey. In November 2010, he became the oldest known person in the United Kingdom to have passed an advanced driving test, having initially passed his driving test in 1935 in a Humber. He celebrated his 100th birthday in January 2018, becoming the first Scottish cricketer to have reached the landmark. He died in November 2019, at the age of 101.

== See also ==
- Longest-lived first-class cricketers
- List of centenarians (sportspeople)
