= Ted Martin (cricketer) =

Australian cricketer (1902–2004)

Personal information
- Full name: Edmund John Martin
- Born: 30 September 1902; Eaglehawk, Bendigo, Victoria, Australia
- Died: 9 June 2004 (aged 101); Perth, Western Australia, Australia
- Batting: Left-handed
- Bowling: Leg spin
- Role: bowler

Domestic team information
- Years: Team
- 1932: Western Australia
- 1932: Australian XI

Career statistics
Competition	First-class
Matches	2
Runs scored	3
Batting average	1.50
100s/50s	0/0
Top score	2
Balls bowled	318
Wickets	6
Bowling average	48.50
5 wickets in innings	0
10 wickets in match	0
Best bowling	3/50
Catches/stumpings	0/–
- Source: CricketArchive, 14 July 2011

Edmund John "Ted" Martin (30 September 1902 – 9 June 2004) was an Australian cricketer who played two first-class matches in 1932–33, both against a touring English side under the captaincy of Douglas Jardine, which used Bodyline tactics. In his first match, for Western Australia against the tourists, he took three wickets in each innings bowling leg breaks, including the wickets of Herbert Sutcliffe, Maurice Leyland, Hedley Verity and the Nawab of Pataudi. In his second match, for an Australian XI against the tourists, he failed to take a wicket, recording figures of 0/126 in his only innings, and making a single run before being stumped by George Duckworth off the bowling of Tommy Mitchell.

Martin died in Perth, Western Australia, at the age of 101 years and 253 days, making him the fifth oldest first-class cricketer ever, and the oldest ever Australian cricketer, as well as the ninth first-class cricketer, and the first Australian cricketer, to live to be 100 years old. Between the death of Jim Hutchinson in November 2000 and his own death he was the oldest living first-class cricketer.

== See also ==
- List of Western Australia first-class cricketers

Preceded by Jim Hutchinson	Oldest living first-class cricketer 7 November 2000 – 9 June 2004	Succeeded by Harry Forsyth
