= Bernarr Notley =

English cricketer (1918–2019)

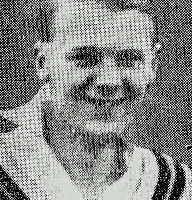

Personal information
- Born: 31 August 1918; Mapperley, Nottinghamshire, England
- Died: 22 January 2019 (aged 100); Stoke-on-Trent, Staffordshire, England
- Nickname: Bill
- Batting: Right-handed
- Bowling: Right-arm off break

Domestic team information
- Years: Team
- 1949: Nottinghamshire

Career statistics
Competition	First-class
Matches	1
Runs scored	0
Batting average	0.00
100s/50s	0/0
Top score	0
Balls bowled	168
Wickets	1
Bowling average	90.00
5 wickets in innings	0
10 wickets in match	0
Best bowling	1/90
Catches/stumpings	0/–
- Source: Cricinfo, 28 January 2019

Bernarr "Bill" Notley (31 August 1918 – 22 January 2019) was an English cricketer. He was a right-handed batsman who bowled right-arm off break.

Notley made a single first-class appearance for Nottinghamshire against Surrey at The Oval in the 1949 County Championship. Surrey won the toss and elected to bat first, making 491/6 declared, with Notley taking the wicket of David Fletcher to finish with figures of 1/90 from 28 overs. In response, Nottinghamshire made 213/8 in their first innings, during which Notley was dismissed for a duck by Alec Bedser. No play was possible on the final day of the game, with a draw the end result.

Notley was a regular member of the Nottinghamshire Second XI from 1949 to 1955. His selection for his only first-class match followed his performance in a Second XI match a few days earlier when he took 9 for 86 and 5 for 53 against Warwickshire Second XI.

He worked for the Nottinghamshire County Council, where he was Deputy Director of Social Services before he retired.

== See also ==
- Lists of oldest cricketers
- List of centenarians (sportspeople)
