= Syd Ward (cricketer) =

New Zealand cricketer

- Syd Ward in December 1933

Personal information
- Full name: Sydney William Ward
- Born: 5 August 1907; Sydney, New South Wales, Australia
- Died: 31 December 2010 (aged 103); Featherston, New Zealand
- Batting: Right-handed
- Bowling: Right-arm medium

Domestic team information
- Years: Team
- 1929/30–1937/38: Wellington

Career statistics
Competition	First-class
Matches	10
Runs scored	282
Batting average	14.84
100s/50s	–/1
Top score	61
Balls bowled	36
Wickets	–
Bowling average	–
5 wickets in innings	–
10 wickets in match	–
Best bowling	–
Catches/stumpings	9/-
- Source: Cricinfo, 9 July 2010

Sydney William Ward (5 August 1907 – 31 December 2010) was an Australian-born New Zealand cricketer. Ward was a right-handed batsman who bowled right-arm medium pace.

From the death of Frank Shipston on 6 July 2005 until his death, Ward was considered the oldest living first-class cricketer and the second oldest ever, behind Jim Hutchinson. Following his death, Cyril Perkins became the oldest living first-class cricketer.

Ward was born in Sydney, Australia – hence his name – and moved to New Zealand in 1917 prior to playing first-class cricket for Wellington in the late 1920s. Alongside cricket, when he was young he was also proficient at rugby, athletics, and football.

His first-class debut for Wellington came in the 1929/30 Plunket Shield against Otago. From 1929/30 to 1937/38, he represented Wellington in 10 first-class matches, with his final first-class match coming against Canterbury. In his 20 first-class innings, he scored 282 runs at a batting average of 14.84, with a single half century high score of 61, which came against Auckland in the 1934/35 season. In 1937–38 he was the leading batsman in Wellington senior club cricket, with 642 runs at an average of 64.20 for Kilbirnie, who won the championship.

He played representative rugby for Wellington between 1931 and 1934, when a broken leg ended his football career.

Ward served in the Royal New Zealand Air Force in World War II, stationed at Nelson. He worked as a watchmaker – initially as his father's apprentice – and jeweller in Wellington until 1982, then retired to the Wairarapa farming village of Kaiwaiwai, between Featherston and Martinborough.

== See also ==
- Oldest first-class cricketers

Preceded by Frank Shipston	Oldest living first-class cricketer 6 July 2005 – 31 December 2010	Succeeded by Cyril Perkins
