= Thomas Mantle =

English cricketer

Thomas Allen Mantle (31 January 1840 – 29 April 1884) was an English first-class cricketer active 1864–73 who played for Middlesex. He was born in Kates Hill, Worcestershire and died in Wandsworth. He was an all-rounder and played in 27 first-class matches.
