= John Wheatley (cricketer) =

New Zealand cricketer

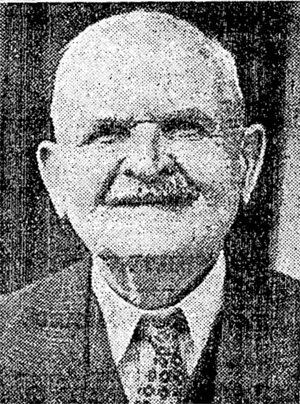
- John Wheatley in 1940

Personal information
- Born: 8 January 1860; Singleton, New South Wales, Australia
- Died: 19 April 1962 (aged 102); Waimate, Canterbury, New Zealand

Domestic team information
- Years: Team
- 1882–1904: Canterbury

Career statistics
Competition	FC
Matches	12
Runs scored	254
Batting average	13.36
100s/50s	0/1
Top score	53
Balls bowled
Wickets	3
Bowling average	18.33
5 wickets in innings	0
10 wickets in match	0
Best bowling	2/27
Catches/stumpings	3/2
- Source: Cricinfo, 30 January 2018

John Wheatley (8 January 1860 – 19 April 1962) was a New Zealand cricketer who played first-class cricket for Canterbury between 1882 and 1904.

Born in Australia, Wheatley moved to New Zealand when he was 16. A middle-order batsman who also bowled early in his career and occasionally kept wicket later in his career, Wheatley made his highest first-class score of 53 against the touring Queenslanders in 1896–97. In senior competition for his club, Christchurch, in 1879–80, Wheatley took 71 wickets at an average of 4.8.

For some years he was the sole Canterbury selector. He also coached in Christchurch.

Wheatley worked on the production side of newspapers, retiring in 1925 after 40 years with the Lyttelton Times. He and his wife Isabel had four daughters and a son. He died in 1962 at the age of 102 years 101 days, making him the longest-lived first-class cricketer at the time. As of 2025, he is the eighth-oldest.

== See also ==
- Lists of oldest cricketers
- List of centenarians (sportspeople)

Unknown	Oldest living first-class cricketer ? – 19 April 1962	Succeeded by Edward English
