= Rusi Cooper =

Indian cricketer (1922–2023)

Personal information
- Full name: Rustom Sorabji Cooper
- Born: 14 December 1922; Bombay, Bombay Presidency, British India
- Died: 31 July 2023 (aged 100); South Mumbai, Maharashtra, India
- Batting: Right-handed

Domestic team information
- Years: Team
- 1941–42 to 1944–45: Parsees
- 1943–44 to 1944–45: Bombay
- 1949 to 1951: Middlesex

Career statistics
Competition	First-class
Matches	22
Runs scored	1205
Batting average	52.39
100s/50s	3/10
Top score	127*
Balls bowled	138
Wickets	0
Bowling average	–
5 wickets in innings	–
10 wickets in match	–
Best bowling	–
Catches/stumpings	7/–
- Source: Cricinfo, 18 April 2017

Rustom Sorabji "Rusi" Cooper (14 December 1922 – 31 July 2023) was an Indian first-class cricketer and lawyer.

== Life and career ==
Cooper was educated in Bombay at Elphinstone High School and St Xavier's High School. A right-handed batsman, he made his first-class debut in the 1941–42 Bombay Pentangular Tournament, playing for the Parsees. In the 1943–44 and 1944–45 seasons he represented Bombay in the Ranji Trophy.

Selected to play for the Rest of India against Western India States in February 1944, Cooper went in to bat at number eight and made his maiden first-class century. He finished the season with 383 runs at an average of 76.60. He improved further in 1944–45, scoring 551 runs at an average of 91.83 with two centuries, one of them in the Ranji Trophy final against Holkar to help Bombay win the title.

Cooper moved to England in 1946 to study at the London School of Economics. He was signed by Middlesex and played one game in the 1949 County Championship. The following season he got a longer run in the side but struggled to make an impact, averaging just 19.63 for the county. He was a champion batsman for Hornsey Cricket Club for several seasons, scoring 1,117 in 19 innings in 1953 at an average of 139.62, before returning to India with his English wife to practise as a barrister. A serious knee injury ended his playing career soon after his return to India. He practised in India as a maritime lawyer until he retired in his nineties.

Cooper was the last surviving player from the Pentangular Tournament, which ceased after the 1945–46 season. He is also the longest-lived first-class player in the history of Middlesex. He turned 100 on 14 December 2022, and died in South Mumbai on 31 July 2023.

Preceded by Raghunath Chandorkar	Oldest Living First-Class Cricketer; 3 September 2021 – 31 July 2023	Unknown
