= Mandy Yachad =

South African cricketer and field hockey player

Personal information
- Born: 17 November 1960 (age 65); Johannesburg, Transvaal
- Batting: Right-handed
- Bowling: Leg-break

International information
- National side: South Africa
- ODI debut (cap 1): 12 November 1991 v India
- Source: ESPNcricinfo, 17 January 2008

Mandy Yachad (born 17 November 1960) is a former South African cricketer and field hockey player who represented the South African national team in both sports. He is a qualified attorney, and an active business executive.

Yachad made his international cricket debut for South Africa in 1991, but only played one One Day International for South Africa. With much of his cricket career falling during the international sporting boycott of South Africa in the 1980s and early 1990s, Yachad was denied the opportunity of playing international career during the prime of his career. He was named among the South African Cricket Annual five Players of the Year both in 1985 and 1991. He was a specialist opening batsman who scored 14 centuries and 32 fifties in his 16-year first class career, which spanned 109 matches, mostly for Transvaal in two spells (1978–1983 and 1992–1994) and Northern Transvaal (between 1983 and 1992). He was selected for the tour of India, and after Andrew Hudson made a duck opening the innings during a three-wicket loss in the first ODI in Calcutta, Hudson was replaced by Yachad for the second match at Gwalior. Yachad held the catch to dismiss Kris Srikkanth, the first wicket to fall in the match, but his batting was too slow to win the match; with the required run rate slightly above five, Yachad's 31 off 77 balls slowed the team down. He was eventually lbw to spinner Venkatapathy Raju, and South Africa lost by 38 runs. Yachad was replaced by Hudson for the third match, and never played international cricket again, though he turned out for an Invitation XI against India during the 1992–93 season.

In hockey, Yachad played at least 21 Test matches, and also represented his country at indoor hockey.

He is an executive director at the Peregrine Group, joining in 1999. Prior to this, he was a Law partner at Werksmans Attorneys, practicing commercial law; he was with the firm for 14 years, nine as a partner. He holds a BComm and LLB, both from the University of the Witwatersrand.

He played one ODI for South Africa in 1991 against india and score 31 runs. His son, Shaul, closely follows in his footsteps having played and captained the SA Maccabi Junior Cricket team at the 2009 Maccabi Games, bringing home gold with his team. Shaul was also voted fielder of the tournament.

His youngest son Ariel, played for Melbourne-based Lordo Leggies at Oakleigh Cricket club in Victoria, Australia, in addition to featuring as the leading run scorer in YG Australia's renowned outdoor cricket competition.

== Honours ==
In 2024, at the South African Jewish Board of Deputies' 120th anniversary gala dinner, he was honoured among 100 remarkable Jewish South Africans who have contributed to South Africa. The ceremony included speeches from Chief Rabbi Ephraim Mirvis, and Yachad was honoured among other cricketers such as Norman Gordon, Fred Susskind and Dennis Gamsy.

== See also ==
- List of select Jewish cricketers
