= Harry Forsyth =

Irish cricketer

Personal information
- Full name: Harry Hollingsworth Forsyth
- Born: 18 December 1903; Dublin, Ireland
- Died: 19 July 2004 (aged 100); Dublin, Ireland
- Batting: Left-handed
- Role: Wicket-keeper

Domestic team information
- Years: Team
- 1926: Dublin University

Career statistics
Competition	First-class
Matches	1
Runs scored	49
Batting average	24.50
100s/50s	–/–
Top score	43
Catches/stumpings	2/1
- Source: Cricinfo, 4 February 2019

Harry Hollingsworth Forsyth (18 December 1903 – 19 July 2004) was an Irish cricketer. He was born in Dublin, Ireland. A left-handed batsman and occasional wicket-keeper, he played one first-class match for Dublin University against Northamptonshire in June 1926. He scored 43 runs in the Dublin University first innings. The match also featured the Irish playwright Samuel Beckett. From the death of Ted Martin in June 2004 to his death, aged 100, just over a month later, Forsyth was the oldest living first-class cricketer.

Preceded by Ted Martin	Oldest living first-class cricketer 9 June 2004 – 19 July 2004	Succeeded by Frank Shipston
