= John Swan (cricketer) =

English cricketer (1848–1924)

John James Swan (24 September 1848 – 22 February 1924) was an English first-class cricketer active 1870–76 who played for Surrey. He was born in Oadby; died in Maidstone.
