= Cyril Perkins =

English cricketer (1911–2013)

Personal information
- Full name: George Cyril Perkins
- Born: 4 June 1911; Wollaston, Northamptonshire, England
- Died: 21 November 2013 (aged 102); Ipswich, Suffolk, England
- Batting: Right-handed
- Bowling: Slow left-arm orthodox Left-arm medium

Domestic team information
- Years: Team
- 1934–1937: Northamptonshire
- 1939–1967: Suffolk
- 1951: Minor Counties

Career statistics
Competition	First-class	List A
Matches	57	1
Runs scored	589	–
Batting average	8.18	–
100s/50s	0/0	–
Top score	29	–
Balls bowled	7,772	72
Wickets	93	0
Bowling average	36.11	–
5 wickets in innings	5	–
10 wickets in match	0	–
Best bowling	6/54	–
Catches/stumpings	30/–	0/–
- Source: Cricinfo, 12 June 2011

George Cyril Perkins (4 June 1911 – 21 November 2013) was an English cricketer. Perkins was a right-handed batsman who bowled both slow left-arm orthodox and left-arm medium pace. He was born in Wollaston, Northamptonshire. On 4 June 2011 he became the 13th former first-class player to reach 100 years of age, and the fourth county cricketer to do so. Following the death of Syd Ward in January 2010, Perkins held the distinction of being the oldest living first-class cricketer.

== Career ==
Perkins made his first-class debut for Northamptonshire County Cricket Club against Middlesex in the County Championship. He played for Northamptonshire from 1934 to 1937, a period notable in Northamptonshire's history for their astonishing winless run: the county failed to register a win in 99 first-class matches between 1935 and 1939. Perkins made 56 first-class appearances for Northamptonshire, without ever being on the winning side. Perkins performed well with the ball during his first-class career with the county, taking 93 wickets at an average of 35.58, claiming a five wicket haul on 5 occasions, and taking best figures of 6/54. His best figures came against Worcestershire in 1935, a season which was by far and away his best season with the ball, with Perkins taking 63 wickets at 26.46 a piece. As a tailender, Perkins scored 560 runs with the bat, coming at a batting average of 7.88, with a high score of 29. A handy fielder, he took 30 catches in the field. Perkins left Northamptonshire at the end of the end of the 1937 season, having played his final match against Lancashire at Old Trafford.

Moving to Ipswich, he joined minor county Suffolk in 1939, making his debut for the county in the Minor Counties Championship against Lincolnshire. He played throughout 1939, before the Second World War ended county cricket until 1946. During the war, he served with the Royal Artillery, spending time at the end of the war in Cairo, Egypt. Perkins returned to playing minor counties cricket for Suffolk following the war, which he had to balance with his work commitments as cricket coach at Ipswich School.

In 1951 he made his final first-class appearance, which came for the Minor Counties cricket team against Kent. In his final first-class match, he scored 8 runs in the Minor Counties first-innings and an unbeaten 21 in their second-innings. However, he went wicket-less with the ball and Kent won by an innings. This meant he went winless in his 57 first-class appearances, a record for the number of first-class appearances without featuring in a win.

Perkins continued to play for Suffolk in the Minor Counties Championship until 1967, having by then made 105 appearances for the county. By the time of his retirement at the age of 56, he had claimed a record 779 wickets for the county, some way ahead of Colin Rutterford's 431. Such was Perkins' accuracy as a bowler, The Daily Telegraph reporter Simon Parry-Crooke described watching him bowl as: "he had this incredible control: he could just drop the ball on a handkerchief." Indeed, he once took 10 wickets in an innings, when playing against Hertfordshire in 1960. He still had the match ball when he celebrated his 100th birthday.

Perkins also made a solitary List A appearance for Suffolk at the age of 55 in the 1966 Gillette Cup against a powerful Kent side at Ipswich School. He bowled 12 wicket-less overs for the cost of 31 runs, while he wasn't required to bat in the Suffolk innings as Kent ran out winners by 113 runs.

== See also ==
- Lists of oldest cricketers

Preceded by Syd Ward	Oldest Living First-Class Cricketer; 1 January 2011 – 21 November 2013	Succeeded by Norman Gordon
