= HMS Eglinton (L87) =

Destroyer of the Royal Navy

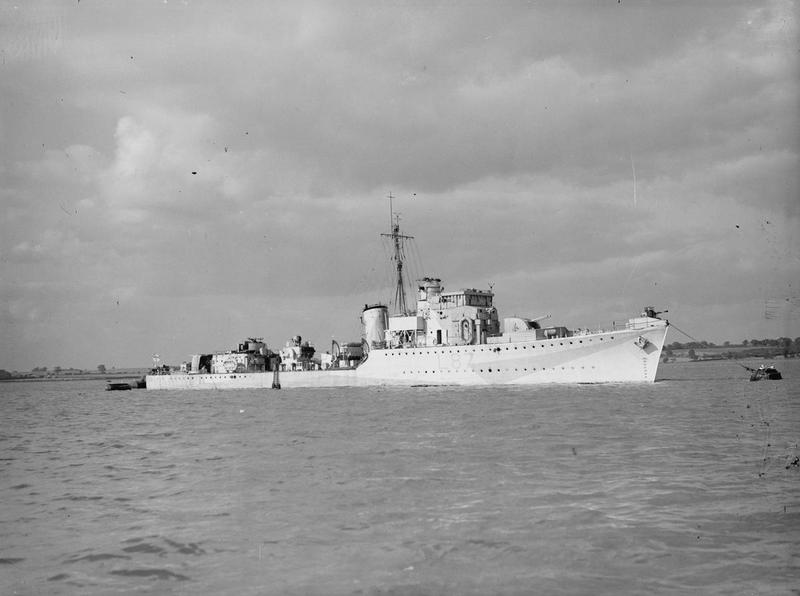
- HMS Eglinton, c1942

History

United Kingdom
- Name: HMS Eglinton
- Ordered: 21 March 1939
- Builder: Vickers-Armstrongs, River Tyne
- Yard number: Admiralty Job No.J4091
- Laid down: 8 June 1939
- Launched: 28 December 1939
- Completed: 28 August 1940
- Identification: Pennant number: L87
- Honours and awards: Atlantic 1940; English Channel 1940–44; North Sea 1941–44; Normandy 1944
- Fate: Scrapped in May 1956
- Badge: On a Field Red, two hunting horns in saltire and three annulets interlaced Gold

General characteristics
- Class & type: Type I Hunt-class destroyer
- Displacement: 1,000 long tons (1,016 t) standard; 1,340 long tons (1,362 t) full load
- Length: 85 m (278 ft 10 in) o/a
- Beam: 8.8 m (28 ft 10 in)
- Draught: 3.27 m (10 ft 9 in)
- Propulsion: 2 Admiralty 3-drum boilers; 2 shaft Parsons geared turbines, 19,000 shp
- Speed: 27.5 knots (31.6 mph; 50.9 km/h); 26 kn (30 mph; 48 km/h) full
- Range: 3,500 nmi (6,500 km) at 15 kn (28 km/h); 1,000 nmi (1,900 km) at 26 kn (48 km/h)
- Complement: 146
- Armament: 4 × QF 4-inch (102 mm) Mark XVI guns on twin mounts Mk. XIX; 4 × QF 2-pounder (40 mm) Mk VIII AA guns on quad mount MK.VII; 2 × 20-mm Oerlikon AA guns on single mounts P Mk. III; 40 depth charges, 2 throwers, 1 rack

HMS Eglinton (L87) was a Type I Hunt-class destroyer of the Royal Navy built by Vickers-Armstrongs on the River Tyne, and launched on 28 December 1939. She was adopted by the town of Alton, Hampshire, as part of the Warship Week campaign in 1942.

== Service history ==
Eglinton served with the 16th Destroyer Flotilla at Harwich for the whole of her wartime service. She was involved in two actions with German S-Boats whilst escorting East coast convoys. She also was part of the support force for the Normandy landings.

After August 1945 she was decommissioned and placed in reserve at Harwich. On 24 June 1955 she was designated as a trials ship for exercise 'Sleeping Beauty' designed to test the state of ships held in reserve, and the time taken to bring them forward for service in the active fleet. She was sold for scrapping and arrived for scrapping at Blyth by Hughes Bolckow on 28 May 1956.

== Publications ==
- Colledge, J. J.; Warlow, Ben (2006) [1969]. Ships of the Royal Navy: The Complete Record of All Fighting Ships of the Royal Navy from the 15th Century to the Present (3rd Rev ed.). London: Chatham Publishing. ISBN 978-1-86176-281-8. OCLC 67375475.
- English, John (1987). The Hunts: a history of the design, development and careers of the 86 destroyers of this class built for the Royal and Allied Navies during World War II. England: World Ship Society. ISBN 0-905617-44-4.
