= List of last surviving World War II veterans =

The people listed below are, or were, each the last surviving member of a notable group of World War II veterans, as identified by reliable sources. About 70 million people fought in World War II between 1939 and 1945.

== Last survivors ==
Background shading indicates the individual is still living

=== Last survivors of countries or territories ===
Veteran	Birth	Death	Notability	Service	Allegiance
Yunus Abdulshaidov	15 June 1921	2 December 2023 (aged 102)	Last surviving veteran of Chechnya.	Red Army	Soviet Union
Morrison Appleton	1927 or 1928	19 August 2022 (aged 95)	Last surviving veteran of Antigua and Barbuda.	British Army	British Leeward Islands
Jale Bainisika	1914 or 1915	15 February 2020 (aged 105)	Last surviving veteran of Fiji.	Fiji Infantry Regiment	Fiji
Twistleton St. Rose Bertrand	24 September 1924	8 December 2019 (aged 95)	Last surviving veteran of Dominica.	British Army	British Windward Islands
Horacio Castilleja Albarrán	21 January 1924	30 November 2022 (aged 97–98)	Last surviving veteran of Mexico. (Note: Castilleja Albarrán, a radio operator, was the last veteran from Mexico and the last of the Aztec Eagles. The last pilot of the Aztec Eagles was Carlos Garduño Nuñez (1919–2022).)	Mexican Air Force	Mexico
Kgori Molefhe Gaborone	1917 or 1918	10 June 2017 (aged 99)	Last surviving veteran of Bechuanaland.	British Army	Bechuanaland Protectorate
Nikolay Georgiev–Shmayzera	25 November 1922	1 January 2024 (aged 101)	Last surviving partisan of Bulgaria.	Bulgarian resistance movement	Bulgaria
Ebou Janha	1919 or 1920	1 July 2022 (aged 102)	Last surviving veteran of Gambia.	Royal West African Frontier Force	The Gambia
James Jeremiah	1924 or 1925	30 June 2022 (aged 97)	Last surviving veteran of Malaysia.	Straits Settlements Volunteer Force	(Malayan Union) Malaya
Doreen Carmel Jones-Rickards	19 September 1924 (age 102)		Last surviving veteran of The Bahamas. (Note: Previously, Zoë Maynard (1926–2018) was believed to be the last surviving female veteran of the Bahamas.)	Auxiliary Territorial Service	Bahamas
Ari Wong Kim	16 January 1924	19 October 2023 (aged 99)	Last surviving veteran of French Polynesia.	French Liberation Army	Free France
Albert Kunyuku	10 May 1922	25 November 2022 (aged 100)	Last surviving veteran of the Belgian Congo.	Force Publique	Belgian Congo
Robert Henry Andrew Lapsley	1921	2 July 2024 (aged 103)	Last surviving veteran of Hong Kong.	British Army	Hong Kong; United Kingdom
Jacques Lucien	4 May 1924	12 September 2024 (aged 100)	Last surviving veteran of New Caledonia.	French Liberation Army	Free France
Magomed Medarov	10 October 1924	14 April 2025 (aged 100)	Last surviving veteran of Ingushetia.	Red Army	Soviet Union
Ben Moide	21 June 1924	30 December 2013 (aged 89)	Last surviving veteran of Papua New Guinea.	Australian Army	Territory of Papua
Ali Nadi	1925 or 1926	December 2017 (aged 91 or 92)	Last surviving Moroccan Goumier.	French Liberation Army	Morocco; Free France
Auguste Plénet	1924	29 October 2023 (aged 99)	Last surviving veteran of French Guiana.	French Liberation Army	Free France
Ronald Scott	20 October 1917	17 April 2025 (aged 107)	Last surviving veteran of Argentina. Last surviving Latin American Spitfire pilot.	Royal Navy	Argentina; United Kingdom
Sualua Tui Masaniai	1922	1 April 2019 (aged 97)	Last surviving veteran of American Samoa.	Fita Fita Guard	American Samoa

=== Last surviving recipients of medals or honors ===
Veteran	Birth	Death	Notability	Service	Allegiance
Hugo Broch	6 January 1922	31 May 2026 (aged 104)	Last surviving recipient of the Knight's Cross of the Iron Cross. (Note: Broch, a German, was the last recipient of the Knight's Cross of the Iron Cross from any country. Last surviving recipients from other countries include: Austria: Johann Trummer (1920–2022); Denmark: Søren Kam (1921–2015); Estonia: Harald Nugiseks (1921–2014); Finland: Axel Erik Heinrichs (1890–1965); Hungary: Zoltán Szügyi (1896–1967); Italy: Italo Gariboldi (1879–1970); Japan: Mineichi Koga (1885–1944); Latvia: Zanis Butkus (1906–1999); Romania Horia Macellariu (1894–1989); Slovakia: Jozef Turanec (1892–1957); Spain: Agustín Muñoz Grandes (1896–1970))	Luftwaffe	Germany
John Cruickshank	20 May 1920	9 August 2025 (aged 105)	Last surviving wartime recipient of the Victoria Cross. (Note: Cruickshank, who was Scottish, was the last surviving recipient of the Victoria Cross from any country. Last surviving recipients from other countries include: Australia: Ted Kenna (1919–2009); Canada: Ernest Smith (1914–2005); India: Umrao Singh (1920–2005); Ireland: Marcus Ervine-Andrews (1911–1995); Nepal: Tul Bahadur Pun (1923–2011); New Zealand: Jack Hinton (1909–1997); South Africa: Gerard Norton (1915–2004))	Royal Air Force	United Kingdom
Tuomas Gerdt	28 May 1922	1 November 2020 (aged 98)	Last surviving recipient of the Mannerheim Cross.	Finnish Army	Finland
Hubert Germain	6 August 1920	12 October 2021 (aged 101)	Last surviving Companion of the Order of Liberation.	French Resistance	Free France
Boris Kravtsov	28 December 1922 (age 103)		Last surviving wartime Hero of the Soviet Union.	Red Army	Soviet Union
Petar Matić Dule	6 July 1920	4 October 2024 (aged 104)	Last surviving National Hero of Yugoslavia. (Note: Matić Dule was the last surviving recipient of the Order of the People's Hero. The last surviving woman who received the decoration was Andreana Družina (1920–2021).)	Yugoslav Partisans	Yugoslavia
Kenneth Mayhew	18 January 1917	13 May 2021 (aged 104)	Last surviving recipient of the Military Order of William.	British Army	United Kingdom
Michael I of Romania	25 October 1921	5 December 2017 (aged 96)	Last surviving recipient of the Order of Victory.	Romanian Armed Forces	Romania
Hershel W. Williams	2 October 1923	29 June 2022 (aged 98)	Last surviving wartime recipient of the Medal of Honor. (Note: Williams, a U.S. Marine, was the last surviving wartime recipient of the Medal of Honor from any branch of the U.S. Armed Forces. Last surviving wartime recipients from other branches include: U.S. Army: Charles Coolidge (1921–2021); U.S. Navy: John William Finn (1909–2010); U.S. Army Air Forces: Jay Zeamer (1918–2007))	US Marine Corps	United States

=== Last surviving senior officers ===
Veteran	Birth	Death	Notability	Service	Allegiance
Mark W. Clark	1 May 1896	17 April 1984 (aged 87)	Last surviving American four-star officer.	US Army	United States
Karl Dönitz	16 September 1891	24 December 1980 (aged 89)	Last surviving German Großadmiral. (Note: Dönitz, an Admiral, was the last surviving five star officer of Nazi Germany. The last surviving Army Generalfeldmarschall was Ferdinand Schörner (1892–1973). The last surviving Luftwaffe Generalfeldmarschall was Erhard Milch (1892–1972).)	Kriegsmarine	Germany
Dwight D. Eisenhower	14 October 1890	28 March 1969 (aged 78)	Last surviving wartime American five-star officer. (Note: Eisenhower was the last surviving wartime General of the Army. (Omar Bradley (1893–1981) was promoted to the rank after the war, in 1950.) The last surviving wartime Fleet Admiral was Chester Nimitz (1885–1966).)	US Army	United States
Shunroku Hata	26 July 1879	10 May 1962 (aged 82)	Last surviving Japanese marshal (gensui).	Imperial Japanese Army	Japan
Heinrich Trettner	19 September 1907	18 September 2006 (aged 98)	Last surviving general of the Wehrmacht.	Luftwaffe	Germany
Aleksandr Vasilevsky	30 September 1895	5 December 1977 (aged 82)	Last surviving wartime Marshal of the Soviet Union.	Red Army	Soviet Union

=== Last surviving members of notable units, formations, or organizations ===
Veteran	Birth	Death	Notability	Service	Allegiance
Svend Egon Andersen	14 April 1920	August 2017 (aged 97)	Last surviving member of the Hvidsten Group.	Danish resistance movement	Denmark
Richard M. Barancik	19 October 1924	14 July 2023 (aged 98)	Last surviving Monuments Man. (Note: The last surviving woman of the Monuments Men was Motoko Fujishiro Huthwaite (1927–2020).)	US Army	United States
Clarence Beavers	12 June 1921	4 December 2017 (aged 96)	Last surviving original member of the 555th Parachute Infantry Battalion.	US Army	United States
Aron Bielski	21 July 1927	22 September 2025 (aged 98)	Last surviving Bielski partisan.	Jewish partisans	Poland
Betty Tackaberry Blake	29 October 1920	9 April 2015 (aged 94)	Last surviving member of the original WASP class.	Women Airforce Service Pilots	United States
Emil Boček	25 February 1923	25 March 2023 (aged 100)	Last surviving Czechoslovak RAF pilot.	Royal Air Force	Czechoslovakia; United Kingdom
Ejler Borch	6 December 1925 (age 100)		Last surviving member of the BOPA.	Danish resistance movement	Denmark
Fania Brancovskaja	22 May 1922	22 September 2024 (aged 102)	Last surviving partisan of Fareynikte Partizaner Organizatsye (FPO).	Fareynikte Partizaner Organizatsye	Lithuania
John T. Britton	3 February 1920	7 May 2011 (aged 91)	Last surviving crew member of Old 666.	US Army Air Forces	United States
Mircea Caragea	18 January 1919	5 October 2022 (aged 103)	Last surviving veteran of the Romanian Naval Forces.	Romanian Naval Forces	Romania
Eric Carter	12 February 1920	26 July 2021 (aged 101)	Last surviving member of No. 151 Wing.	Royal Air Force	United Kingdom
Jaak Daemen	13 December 1924	6 August 2022 (aged 97)	Last surviving member of the 5th Special Air Service.	Belgian Resistance, Free Belgian Forces	Belgium
Arturo de Gregorio	1920 or 1921	22 September 2023 (aged 102)	Last surviving Spanish volunteer of the Blue Division.	German Army	Spain; Germany
Valdemar DeHerrera	8 October 1919	15 July 2025 (aged 105)	Last surviving member of the 515th Coast Artillery.	US Army	United States
Colette Escoffier-Martini	1 November 1922	28 May 2024 (aged 101)	Last surviving Merlinette.	French Liberation Army	Free France
Mario Fiorentini	7 November 1918	9 August 2022 (aged 103)	Last surviving partisan of Gruppi di Azione Patriottica.	Corpo Volontari della Libertà	Italy
Walter Flaxman	3 February 1923	8 February 2025 (aged 102)	Last surviving Royal Lancer.	British Army	United Kingdom
Bradford C. Freeman	24 September 1924	3 July 2022 (aged 97)	Last surviving member of Easy Company. (Note: Freeman was an enlisted soldier. The last surviving commissioned officer of Easy Company was Edward Shames (1922–2021).)	US Army	United States
Bom Gillies	14 February 1925	7 November 2024 (aged 99)	Last surviving member of the Māori Battalion.	New Zealand Military Forces	New Zealand
Jerzy Główczewski	19 November 1922	13 April 2020 (aged 97)	Last surviving pilot of the Polish Air Forces. (Note: Główczewski was the last surviving pilot of the Polish RAF squadrons. The last surviving squadron commander was Franciszek Kornicki (1916–2017). The last surviving Polish pilot who fought in the Battle of Britain was Tadeusz Sawicz (1914–2011).)	Royal Air Force	Poland; United Kingdom
Rafael Gómez Nieto	21 January 1921	31 March 2020 (aged 99)	Last surviving member of La Nueve.	French Liberation Army	Free France
Friedrich Grade	29 March 1916	13 October 2023 (aged 107)	Last surviving crew member of U-96.	Kriegsmarine	Germany
Russell Hamler	29 June 1924	26 December 2023 (aged 99)	Last surviving member of Merrill's Marauders.	US Army	United States
Victor Hannes	26 July 1924	25 January 2025 (aged 100)	Last surviving member of the Independent Belgian Brigade.	Free Belgian forces	Belgium
Robert John Hanson	25 May 1920	1 October 2005 (aged 85)	Last surviving crew member of Memphis Belle.	US Army Air Forces	United States
Lloyd Harding	1922	2 February 2021 (aged 99)	Last surviving member of Tasmania's 2/40th Battalion.	Australian Army	Australia
Ellsworth Johnson	5 July 1923	30 September 2023 (aged 100)	Last surviving member of the OSS OG.	Office of Strategic Services	United States
Gertrud Koch	1 June 1924	21 June 2016 (aged 92)	Last surviving member of the Edelweiss Pirates.	German Resistance movement	Germany
Georgios Koliopoulos	20 February 1915	2 May 2023 (aged 108)	Last surviving member of the Cavalry Division.	Hellenic Army	Greece
Traute Lafrenz	3 May 1919	6 March 2023 (aged 103)	Last surviving White Rose.	German Resistance movement	Germany
Sakari Lahtinen	29 September 1923	12 October 2022 (aged 99)	Last surviving Finnish Waffen-SS volunteer.	Finnish volunteers in the Waffen-SS	Finland; Germany
Daniel Lehotský	22 December 1920 (age 105)		Last surviving member of the Slovak Expeditionary Army Group.	Slovak Expeditionary Army Group	First Slovak Republic
Frank Losonsky	8 October 1920	6 February 2020 (aged 99)	Last surviving member of the Flying Tigers. (Note: Losonsky is recognized as the last surviving Flying Tiger by the United States Air Force. Other veterans identified as last surviving members include Chen Ping Ching (1918–2022), Stephen Bonner (1918–2021), Carl Kice Brown (1917–2017), and Long Qiming (c. 1923–2014).)	First American Volunteer Group; US Army Air Forces	China; United States
John Luckadoo	16 March 1922	1 September 2025 (aged 103)	Last surviving pilot of the 100th Bomb Group.	United States Air Force	United States
Tadeusz Lutak	29 August 1917	5 October 2026 (aged 109)	Last surviving member of the 10th Motorized Cavalry Brigade.	Polish Land Forces	Poland
Jack Mann	1925	15 August 2026 (aged 100)	Last surviving member of the Long Range Desert Group.	British Army	United Kingdom
Dmytro Marusiak	2 July 1925	24 October 2026 (aged 101)	Last surviving member of the SS Division Galicia.	Waffen-SS	Germany
Mauri Maunula	2 June 1921	14 September 2024 (aged 103)	Last surviving FAF pilot.	Finnish Army	Finland
Fannie McClendon	22 September 1920 (age 106)		Last surviving member of the 6888th Central Postal Directory Battalion.	Women's Army Corps	United States
Marie Michajlovičová	22 August 1921	14 July 2022 (aged 100)	Last surviving member of 1st Czechoslovak Independent Tank Brigade.	1st Czechoslovak Army Corps in the Soviet Union	Czechoslovakia; Soviet Union
Helge Milo	1927 or 1928	27 March 2022 (aged 94)	Last surviving member of the Churchill Club.	Danish resistance movement	Denmark
José Carlos de Miranda Corrêa	1919 or 1920	15 September 2013 (aged 93)	Last surviving pilot of Brazil.	Brazilian Air Force	Brazil
Roger Le Neurès	25 March 1923	28 September 2026 (aged 103)	Last surviving member of the 2nd Armored Division.	French Liberation Army	Free France
Eugeniusz Niedzielski	1 September 1923 (age 103)		Last surviving member of the Polish 1st Armoured Division.	Polish Armed Forces in the West	Poland
Bent Nielsen	1922	8 January 2022 (aged 99)	Last surviving member of the Holger Danske.	Danish resistance movement	Denmark
Bolek Ostrowski	4 July 1919	17 March 2025 (aged 105)	Last surviving member of the 1st Independent Parachute Brigade.	Polish Air Forces in France and Great Britain	Poland
Steve Pisanos	10 November 1919	6 June 2016 (aged 96)	Last surviving pilot of the Eagle Squadrons.	Royal Air Force; US Army Air Forces	United Kingdom; United States
Alex Polowin	15 April 1924	16 August 2022 (aged 98)	Last surviving crew member of HMCS Huron.	Royal Canadian Navy	Canada
Dick Ramsey	31 October 1923 (age 103)		Last surviving crew member of USS Nevada.	United States Navy	United States
August Rathke	21 December 1925	25 November 2022 (aged 96)	Last surviving Norwegian veteran of the Norwegian Independent Company 1.	Special Operations Executive	Norway; United Kingdom
Willie Rogers	12 April 1915	18 November 2016 (aged 101)	Last surviving original member of the Tuskegee airmen.	US Army Air Forces	United States
Justus Rosenberg	23 January 1921	30 October 2021 (aged 100)	Last surviving member of the Emergency Rescue Committee.	French Resistance	Free France
William Allan Russell	15 October 1923	16 April 2026 (aged 102)	Last surviving member of Z Special Unit.	Australian Army	Australia
Zbigniew Rylski	23 January 1923	7 November 2025 (aged 102)	Last surviving member of the Parasol Battalion.	Home Army	Poland
Bořivoj Sedláček	9 August 1927	24 February 2026 (aged 98)	Last surviving Czechoslovak member of the Yugoslav National Liberation Army.	Yugoslav Partisans	Yugoslavia
Jack Shearer	7 September 1921	26 August 2022 (aged 100)	Last surviving member of the Sino-American Cooperative Organization.	US Navy	United States
Clarence Smoyer	25 June 1923	30 September 2022 (aged 99)	Last surviving member of the "Spearhead" 3rd Armored Division.	US Army	United States
Erhard Stenzel	5 February 1925	18 November 2021 (aged 96)	Last surviving German member of the French Resistance.	French Resistance; German Army	Free France; Germany
Gene Stephens	13 July 1918	20 July 2018 (aged 100)	Last surviving member of the Military Police Corps.	United States Army	United States
Nancy Stratford	12 June 1919 (age 107)		Last surviving Attagirl.	Air Transport Auxiliary	United Kingdom
Aleksander Tarnawski	8 January 1921	4 March 2022 (aged 101)	Last surviving Cichociemni.	Home Army	Poland
Arsène Tchakarian	21 December 1916	4 August 2018 (aged 101)	Last surviving member of Groupe Manouchian.	French Resistance	Free France
Theodore Van Kirk	27 February 1921	28 July 2014 (aged 93)	Last surviving crew member of the Enola Gay.	US Army Air Forces	United States
Ewald-Heinrich von Kleist-Schmenzin	10 July 1922	8 March 2013 (aged 90)	Last surviving member of the 20 July plot.	German Army	Germany
Herbert Wahler	10 December 1921	November 2023 (aged 101)	Last surviving member of Einsatzgruppe C.	Schutzstaffel	Germany
Henry Weldon	29 May 1923	5 October 2018 (aged 95)	Last surviving member of Underwater Demolition Team 10.	Office of Strategic Services; US Navy	United States
Jozef Zawitkowski	20 February 1922	14 September 2018 (aged 96)	Last surviving member of the Ojciec Jan unit.	Home Army	Poland
Gerard Zinser	31 May 1918	21 August 2001 (aged 83)	Last surviving crew member of PT-109.	US Navy	United States

=== Last survivors of notable sinkings ===
Veteran	Birth	Death	Notability	Service	Allegiance
Gustavo Bellazzini	29 September 1921	1 May 2025 (aged 103)	Last survivor of the sinking of Roma.	Regia Marina	Italy
Harold Bray	15 June 1927 (age 99)		Last survivor of the sinking of USS Indianapolis. (Note: Bray was a USS Indianapolis crew member. The last survivor of the ship's Marine Detachment was Edgar Harrell (1924–2021). The last surviving officer was Don Howison (1921–2020).)	US Navy	United States
Ted Briggs	1 March 1923	4 October 2008 (aged 85)	Last survivor of the sinking of HMS Hood.	Royal Navy	United Kingdom
Leonard Roy Chivers	4 July 1924 (age 102)		Last survivor of the sinking of HMS Kipling.	Royal Navy	United Kingdom
Lou Conter	13 September 1921	1 April 2024 (aged 102)	Last survivor of the sinking of USS Arizona. (Note: Conter, an enlisted U.S. Navy sailor, was the last survivor of the sinking of USS Arizona. The last survivor of the ship's Marine Detachment was Lamar Crawford (1920–2011). The last surviving commissioned officer was Joseph Langdell (1914–2015).)	US Navy	United States
Desmond Grieve Jones	4 May 1923	31 July 2025 (aged 102)	Last survivor of the sinking of HMAS Canberra.	Royal Australian Navy	Australia
William R. Leibold	4 April 1923	3 November 2022 (aged 99)	Last survivor of the sinking of USS Tang.	US Navy	United States
Frank McGovern	1 October 1919	24 May 2023 (aged 103)	Last survivor of the sinking of HMAS Perth.	Royal Australian Navy	Australia
Warren Upton	17 October 1919	25 December 2024 (aged 105)	Last survivor of the sinking of USS Utah.	US Navy	United States
Esko Vallin	25 August 1922	13 December 2019 (aged 97)	Last survivor of the sinking of Finnish coastal defence ship Ilmarinen	Finnish Navy	Finland

=== Last surviving veterans of battles, operations, or uprisings ===
Veteran	Birth	Death	Notability	Service	Allegiance
Aimé Acton	1917 or 1918	13 December 2020 (aged 102)	Last surviving veteran of the Battle of the Lys.	Belgian Armed Forces	Belgium
Antonio Amoretti	11 September 1927	23 December 2022 (aged 95)	Last surviving Italian partisan of Four Days of Naples.	Italian resistance movement	Italy
Viljo Aronniemi	1925 or 1926	31 January 2025 (aged 99)	Last surviving Finnish veteran of the Battle of Teikari.	Finnish Army	Finland
Grigol Baindurashvili	1918 or 1919	August 2021 (aged 102)	Last survivor of the Georgian uprising on Texel.	Georgian Legion	Germany
Zdzisław Baszak	8 July 1920	28 November 2024 (aged 104)	Last surviving Polish veteran of the Battle of Pszczyna.	Polish Land Forces	Poland
Nikolai Belyaev	22 October 1922	8 December 2015 (aged 93)	Last surviving soldier who stormed the Reichstag.	Red Army	Soviet Union
Moss Berryman	9 November 1923	6 August 2020 (aged 96)	Last surviving veteran of Operation Jaywick.	Royal Australian Navy	Australia
Emilio Bianchi	22 October 1912	15 August 2015 (aged 102)	Last surviving torpedo rider of the Raid on Alexandria.	Regia Marina	Italy
Clifford Brewer	29 April 1913	30 April 2017 (aged 104)	Last surviving surgeon of the Normandy landings.	Territorial Army	United Kingdom
Douglas Canning	4 July 1919	20 February 2016 (aged 96)	Last surviving pilot of Operation Vengeance. (Note: Canning was the last surviving pilot of Operation Vengeance. The last pilot credited with a confirmed kill was Rex T. Barber (1917–2001).)	US Army Air Forces	United States
Reginald James Chard	31 October 1923	24 July 2026 (aged 102)	Last surviving Australian veteran of Kokoda Track campaign.	Australian Army	Australia
Tserengiin Chimedtseren	1 October 1924 (age 102)		Last surviving Mongolian veteran of the Battles of Khalkhin Gol.	Mongolian People's Army	Mongolia
Stefan Chociej	1927	19 May 2025 (aged 98)	Last surviving Polish veteran of the Battle of Grodno. (Note: Previously, Kazimierz Tumiński (1920–2020) was believed to be the last surviving defender of Grodno.)	Polish resistance movement in World War II	Poland
Richard E. Cole	7 September 1915	9 April 2019 (aged 103)	Last surviving Doolittle Raider.	US Army Air Forces	United States
Leslie Cook	January 1923	March 2026 (aged 103)	Last surviving ANZAC veteran of the Battle of Crete.	Australian and New Zealand Army Corps	Australia
Marian Drożdż	15 October 1920 (age 106)		Last surviving Polish veteran of the Polish Defensive War of 1939.	Polish Land Forces	Poland
Walenty Faterkowski	25 January 1912	7 May 2013 (aged 101)	Last surviving Polish veteran of the Battle of Tczew.	Polish Land Forces	Poland
Hormidas Joseph Fredette	11 April 1917	29 November 2023 (aged 106)	Last surviving Canadian veteran of the Battle of Hong Kong.	Canadian Army	Canada
Franciszek Grzegorzek	1919	January 2014 (aged 94)	Last surviving Polish veteran of the Battle of Mikołów.	Polish Land Forces	Poland
Jarmila Halbrštátová	7 April 1924	2 December 2020 (aged 96)	Last surviving Czechoslovak veteran of the Battle of Sokolovo.	Czechoslovak Army	Czechoslovakia; Soviet Union
Jean de Heaulme	9 January 1923	13 June 2025 (aged 102)	Last surviving French veteran of the Japanese coup d'état in French Indochina.	French Army	France
John Hemingway	17 July 1919	17 March 2025 (aged 105)	Last surviving pilot of The Few. (Note: Hemingway, who was Irish, was the last surviving pilot of the Battle of Britain. Paul Farnes (1918–2020) was the last surviving flying ace. Last surviving Battle of Britain pilots from other countries include: Canada: John Hart (1916–2019); England: Terry Clark (1919–2020); France: Henry Lafont (1920–2011); New Zealand: Bernard Brown (1917–2017); Poland: Tadeusz Sawicz (1914–2011); United States: John Kenneth Haviland (1921–2002))	Royal Air Force	United Kingdom
Ervín Hoida	30 November 1918	14 February 2024 (aged 105)	Last surviving Czechoslovak veteran of the Battle of France.	Czechoslovak Army	Czechoslovakia; France; United Kingdom
Pavel Holeček	26 August 1925 (age 101)		Last surviving Czechoslovak participant of the Prague uprising.	Resistance in the Protectorate of Bohemia and Moravia	Protectorate of Bohemia and Moravia; Czechoslovakia
Vagn Baagø Jepsen	1917 or 1918	1 September 2018 (aged 100)	Last surviving Danish veteran of the Battle of Haderslev.	Royal Danish Army	Denmark
Ladislav Jindra	June 1921	30 April 2026 (aged 104)	Last surviving Czech American veteran of the Normandy landings.	United States Army	United States
Johnny Johnson	25 November 1921	7 December 2022 (aged 101)	Last surviving member of the Dambuster Raids. (Note: Johnson was a bomb aimer. The last surviving Dambuster pilot was Les Munro (1919–2015).)	Royal Air Force	United Kingdom
Ilmari Koppinen	8 January 1918 (age 108)		Last surviving Finnish veteran of the Winter War and Mai Guba attack.	Finnish Army	Finland
Jan Boerema	12 January 1919 (age 107)		Last surviving Dutch veteran of the Battle of the Afsluitdijk.	Royal Netherlands Army	Netherlands
Juliusz Kulesza	19 May 1928	5 February 2025 (aged 96)	Last surviving participant in the Battles for the Polish Security Printing Works.	Polish Home Army	Polish Underground State
Petr Kotelnikov	1929	21 April 2021 (aged 91–92)	Last surviving Soviet veteran of the Defense of Brest Fortress.	Red Army	Soviet Union
Paul Leterrier	21 December 1921	28 August 2025 (aged 103)	Last surviving French veteran of the Battle of Bir Hakeim.	French Liberation Army	Free France
Jacques Lewis	1 March 1919	25 July 2024 (aged 105)	Last surviving French veteran of the Normandy landings. (Note: Previously, Léon Gautier (1922–2023) was believed to be the last living French veteran of the Allied landings on D-Day.)	Free French Naval Forces; US Army	Free France; United States
Jan Linzel	7 December 1915	5 May 2019 (aged 103)	Last surviving Dutch pilot of the Battle for The Hague.	Army Aviation Brigade	Netherlands
Choi Lodthanong	1920 or 1921	2 June 2021 (aged 100 or 101)	Last surviving Thai veteran of the Battle of Prachuap Khiri Khan.	Royal Thai Air Force	Thailand
Ivan Martynushkin	18 January 1924 (age 102)		Last surviving liberator of the Auschwitz concentration camp. (Note: Previously, David Dushman (1923–2021) was believed to be the last surviving liberator of Auschwitz.)	Red Army	Soviet Union
Stenio Mezzetti	1921	October 2016 (aged 95)	Last surviving Italian veteran of the Battle of Cape Matapan.	Regia Marina	Italy
John F. Miniclier	23 July 1921	24 May 2025 (aged 103)	Last surviving American veteran of the Battle of Midway. (Note: Miniclier, a Marine private at the time of the battle, was the last surviving American veteran of Midway. The last surviving dive bomber pilot was Norman Kleiss (1916–2016).)	US Marines	United States
Ujang Mormin	1920	9 February 2021 (aged 100)	Last surviving veteran of the Battle of Pasir Panjang.	Royal Malay Regiment	(Malayan Union) Malaya
Keiji Nagai	1921	4 November 2019 (aged 98)	Last surviving Japanese veteran of the Battle of Peleliu.	Imperial Japanese Army	Japan
Roger Naël	1923 or 1924	13 April 2020 (aged 96)	Last surviving French veteran of the Slovak National Uprising.	Foch Battalion, 1st Czechoslovak Partisan Brigade	France; Czechoslovakia
Henry Parham	15 November 1921	4 July 2021 (aged 99)	Last surviving African American veteran of the Normandy landings.	US Army	United States
Aleksander Pawelec	13 December 1915	4 February 2019 (aged 103)	Last surviving Polish veteran of the Battle of Kępa Oksywska.	Polish Land Forces	Poland
Carlo Poncia	27 December 1922	8 December 2023 (aged 100)	Last surviving Italian veteran of the Battle of Nikolayevka.	Regio Esercito	Italy
Paul Priest	25 December 1925 (age 100)		Last surviving veteran of the Battle of Remagen.	US Army	United States
Tom Pritchard	24 August 1921	3 August 2024 (aged 102)	Last surviving Australian veteran of the Siege of Tobruk. (Note: The last surviving Czechoslovak veteran of the Siege of Tobruk was Bernard Papánek (1920–2021).)	Australian Army	Australia
Vasily Reshetnikov	23 December 1919	20 March 2023 (aged 103)	Last surviving Soviet participant of the bombing of Berlin.	Soviet Air Force	Soviet Union
Joachim Rønneberg	30 August 1919	21 October 2018 (aged 99)	Last surviving member of Operation Gunnerside.	Norwegian Resistance	Norway
Eystein Røset	28 December 1918	24 December 2022 (aged 104)	Last surviving Norwegian veteran of the Battle of Narvik.	Norwegian Army	Norway
Jorge Sanjinez Lenz	24 January 1917	24 August 2020 (aged 103)	Last surviving Latin American veteran of the Normandy landings.	Independent Belgian Brigade	Belgium
Charles Norman Shay	27 June 1924	3 December 2025 (aged 101)	Last surviving Native American veteran of the Normandy landings.	US Army	United States
Ignacy Skowron	24 July 1915	5 August 2012 (aged 97)	Last surviving Polish veteran of the Battle of Westerplatte.	Polish Land Forces	Poland
Franciszek Skrzypczyk	30 November 1918	22 July 2022 (aged 103)	Last surviving Polish veteran of the Battle of Kock.	Polish Land Forces	Poland
Michael Smuss	15 April 1926	21 October 2025 (aged 99)	Last surviving fighter of the Warsaw Ghetto Uprising. (Note: Previously, Simcha Rotem (1924–2018) and Leon Kopelman (1924–2021) were believed to be the last surviving uprising fighters.)	Jewish Combat Organization (ŻOB)	Poland
Bill Sparks	5 September 1922	1 December 2002 (aged 80)	Last surviving Cockleshell Hero.	Royal Marines	United Kingdom
Vladimír Strmeň	26 August 1928 (age 98)		Last surviving Czechoslovak participant of the Slovak National Uprising.	Slovak Army; First Czechoslovak Army in Slovakia	First Slovak Republic; Czechoslovakia
John Richard Thomson	1923	7 October 2021 (aged 98)	Last surviving veteran of the Battle of the River Plate.	Royal Navy	United Kingdom
Józef Węgiel	30 May 1914	4 April 2018 (aged 103)	Last surviving Polish veteran of the Battle of Mława.	Polish Land Forces	Poland
Władysław Wolańczyk	17 January 1925	13 December 2025 (aged 100)	Last surviving Polish veteran of the Battles of Narol.	Home Army	Poland
Max Wolff	January 1926	May 2025 (aged 99)	Last surviving Dutch veteran of the invasion of Normandy.	Royal Netherlands Army	Canada; Netherlands; United Kingdom
Masamitsu Yoshioka	5 January 1918	29 August 2024 (aged 106)	Last surviving Japanese airman who attacked Pearl Harbor. (Note: Yoshioka, a navigator and bombardier, is the last surviving airman of the attack on Pearl Harbor. Kaname Harada (1916–2016) was the last surviving pilot of the attack.)	Imperial Japanese Navy Air Service	Japan

=== Last surviving prisoners of war ===
Veteran	Birth	Death	Notability	Service	Allegiance
Harold Billow	28 December 1922	17 May 2022 (aged 99)	Last survivor of the Malmedy massacre.	US Army	United States
James Bollich	15 August 1921 (age 105)		Last American survivor of the Bataan Death March	US Army Air Force	United States
Dick Churchill	21 January 1920	12 February 2019 (aged 99)	Last surviving Stalag Luft III escapee.	Royal Air Force	United Kingdom
Maric Gilbert	24 April 1921	24 June 2022 (aged 101)	Last survivor of the Ambon Island POW camp.	Australian Army	Australia
Jack Jennings	10 March 1919	19 January 2024 (aged 104)	Last surviving prisoner forced to build the Burma Railway.	British Army	UK
Mildred Dalton Manning	11 July 1914	8 March 2013 (aged 98)	Last surviving Angel of Bataan and Corregidor.	US Army	United States
Dennis Morley	26 October 1919	3 January 2021 (aged 101)	Last survivor of the sinking of the Lisbon Maru.	British Army	United Kingdom
Teruo Murakami	1920	14 September 2023 (aged 103)	Last survivor of the Cowra breakout.	Imperial Japanese Army	Japan
Billy Young	1925 or 1926	19 May 2022 (aged 96)	Last survivor of the Sandakan POW Camp.	Australian Army	Australia

=== Other last survivors ===
Veteran	Birth	Death	Notability	Service	Allegiance
Bud Anderson	13 January 1922	17 May 2024 (aged 102)	Last surviving American triple flying ace.	US Army Air Forces	United States
Josef Bialas	1 June 1927	4 April 2025 (aged 97)	Last surviving Czech Silesian soldier of Wehrmacht.	Wehrmacht	Germany
Galina Brok-Beltsova	12 February 1925	15 August 2024 (aged 99)	Last surviving Soviet woman combat aviator.	Soviet Air Forces	Soviet Union
Dean Caswell	24 July 1922	21 September 2022 (aged 100)	Last surviving US Marine flying ace.	US Marine Corps	United States
Charles Chibitty	20 November 1921	20 July 2005 (aged 83)	Last surviving Comanche code talker.	US Army	United States
Robert Dixon	11 September 1921	15 November 2024 (aged 103)	Last surviving Buffalo Soldier of West Point.	US Army	United States
Ion Dobran	5 February 1919	24 September 2021 (aged 102)	Last surviving flying ace of the Romanian Air Force.	Romanian Air Force	Romania
James Francis Edwards	5 June 1921	14 May 2022 (aged 100)	Last surviving Canadian flying ace.	Royal Canadian Air Force	Canada
Antonín Fajkus	4 December 1923	5 February 2025 (aged 101)	Last surviving Czech American USAAF pilot.	United States Army Air Forces	United States
Luigi Gorrini	12 July 1917	8 November 2014 (aged 97)	Last surviving Italian flying ace.	Regia Aeronautica	Italy
Louis Graziano	6 February 1923 (age 103)		Last surviving witness to the German surrender.	US Army	United States
David Hamilton	20 July 1922	5 January 2025 (aged 102)	Last surviving C-47 Pathfinder pilot.	US Army Air Forces	United States
Reinhard Hardegen	18 March 1913	9 June 2018 (aged 105)	Last surviving U-boat captain.	Kriegsmarine	Germany
Jiří Pavel Kafka	2 May 1924 (age 102)		Last surviving Czechoslovak RAF airman.	Royal Air Force	Czechoslovakia; United Kingdom
Phyllis Latour	8 April 1921	7 October 2023 (aged 102)	Last surviving woman SOE agent to serve in France.	WAAF, SOE, French Resistance	United Kingdom; Free France
Havala Laula	1925 or 1926	9 February 2017 (aged 91–92)	Last surviving Fuzzy Wuzzy Angel. (Note: "Fuzzy Wuzzy Angels" were Indigenous New Guineans who acted as porters, guides and medics for Australian soldiers in New Guinea.)	Australian Army	Territory of Papua
Robert Laumans	1920	April 2014 (aged 93)	Last surviving Belgian RAF pilot.	Royal Air Force	Belgium; United Kingdom
Lee Hak-rae	1925	28 March 2021 (aged 96)	Last surviving convicted Korean war criminal.	Imperial Japanese Army	Japan
Charles W. Lindberg	26 June 1920	24 June 2007 (aged 86)	Last surviving flag raiser on Iwo Jima. (Note: Lindbergh was one of the Marines who raised the first US flag on Iwo Jima. A few hours later, a larger flag was raised; the last surviving person in the more famous photograph of the second flag raising was Harold Schultz (1925–1995).)	US Marine Corps	United States
Donald M. McPherson	25 May 1922	14 August 2025 (aged 103)	Last surviving American flying ace.	US Navy	United States
Chester Nez	23 January 1921	4 June 2014 (aged 93)	Last surviving original Navajo code talker.	US Marine Corps	United States
John Payne	1924 or 1925	2023 (aged 98)	Last surviving British clearance diver.	Royal Navy	United Kingdom
Johanna Ruf	22 June 1928	21 June 2023 (aged 94)	Last surviving occupant of the Führerbunker: she was a 15-year-old nurse.	Bund Deutscher Mädel	Germany
Norbert Schücking	15 January 1921 (age 105)		Last surviving German flying ace. (Note: Previously, Hugo Broch (1922–2026) was believed to be the last surviving German flying ace.)	Luftwaffe	Germany
Dinko Šakić	8 September 1921	20 July 2008 (aged 86)	Last known surviving commander of a concentration camp. Convicted of war crimes and crimes against humanity in 1998.	Ustaše Supervisory Service	Independent State of Croatia
Jan Stangryciuk-Black	19 April 1922	22 October 2023 (aged 101)	Last surviving member of the Guinea Pig Club.	Royal Air Force	Poland; United Kingdom

== See also ==
- List of last surviving people suspected of participation in Nazi war crimes
- List of last surviving veterans of military insurgencies and wars
