= David Dushman =

Liberator of Auschwitz and Olympic fencing trainer

- Born: 1 April 1923; Free City of Danzig (now Gdańsk, Pomeranian Voivodeship, Poland)
- Died: 4 June 2021 (aged 98); Munich-Neuperlach, Ramersdorf-Perlach, Bavaria, Germany
- Military career
- Allegiance: Soviet Union
- Branch: Red Army
- Service years: 1941–1946
- Conflicts: World War II; Great Patriotic War; Battle of Stalingrad; Battle of Kursk; Vistula–Oder Offensive; Occupation of Germany
- Awards: Order of the Patriotic War
- Other work: Olympic fencing coach

David Aleksandrovich Dushman (Russian: Давид Александрович Душман; 1 April 1923 – 4 June 2021) was a Jewish-Soviet Red Army soldier and a fencing trainer of the Soviet Olympic team. Dushman assisted in the liberation of the Auschwitz-Birkenau concentration camp in occupied Poland, and also fought in the Battle of Stalingrad and the Battle of Kursk during World War II.

== Second World War ==
Dushman was a volunteer in the Red Army as a tank driver, and participated in the Battle of Stalingrad and the Battle of Kursk during the Second World War. He received more than forty decorations and distinctions, including the Order of the Patriotic War.

In the early afternoon of 27 January 1945, Dushman drove his T-34 tank over the electric fence of Auschwitz-Birkenau concentration camp in occupied Poland, thereby initiating the liberation of the camp by allowing Red Army ground troops in the 322nd Rifle Division to enter the camp. In the camp, he witnessed starving people, piles of dead bodies, and later said "we threw them all our canned food and immediately went on to hunt down the fascists", but was not aware at the time of the real purpose of the camp or the scale of the atrocities.

He suffered severe injuries three times as a result of the war.

== Fencing career ==
After the war, Dushman became a professional fencer. He was the trainer of the national women's fencing team of the Soviet Union from 1952 to 1988. In his capacity as fencing trainer at the 1972 Summer Olympics, he witnessed the Munich massacre. He was housed right across from the Israeli athletes and described that he was "horrified" by the events, himself being very conscious of his Jewish background at that time. Thomas Bach, president of the International Olympic Committee (IOC) and former Olympic fencing champion representing West Germany, recalled that when he met Dushman in 1970, Dushman "immediately offered me friendship and counsel, despite [his] personal experience with World War II and Auschwitz, and he being a man of Jewish origin". Bach added that the act was "such a deep human gesture that I will never ever forget it".

Dushman continued to visit his local fencing club to give lessons nearly every day until he was 94, according to the IOC.

== Personal life ==
Dushman was born in Danzig on 1 April 1923. His father was a general, sports physician, and military doctor in the Red Army, while his mother was a pediatrician. Dushman spent part of his childhood in Minsk before the family moved to Moscow, where his father had been hired to lead the medical center at the state institute for sport. His father was later deported to a Gulag north of the Arctic Circle in 1938 during the Great Purge of Joseph Stalin, where he died ten years later.

Dushman lived in Austria for a few years during the 1990s before moving to Munich. From 1996 until his death on 4 June 2021, he lived in Munich-Neuperlach, along with his wife Zoja until her death several years prior.

At the time of his death he was incorrectly labelled by many media organizations as the last surviving liberator of the Auschwitz concentration camp. However, there were still other liberators of the camp who were alive, including Ivan Martynushkin who lives in Moscow.
