= Léon Gautier =

Léon Gautier is the name of:

- Léon Gautier (historian) (1832–1897), French literary historian
- Léon Gautier (soldier) (1922–2023), French soldier, D-day veteran
