= Ivan Martynushkin =

Russian liberator of Auschwitz concentration camp (born 1924)

- Иван Мартынушкин
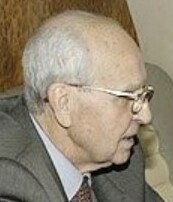
- Martynushkin in 2005
- Born: 18 January 1924 (age 102); Poshchupovo, Ryazan Governorate, Russian SFSR
- Military career
- Allegiance: Soviet Union
- Branch: Workers' and Peasants' Red Army
- Service years: 1941–1946
- Rank: Senior lieutenant
- Unit: 1,087th Rifle Regiment of the 322nd Rifle Division
- Conflict: Eastern Front (World War II)
- Awards: Order of the Red Star; Order of the Patriotic War, 1st and 2nd class; Order of the Red Banner; Order of the Badge of Honour; Medal "For the Victory over Germany in the Great Patriotic War 1941–1945"; Medal of Zhukov

Ivan Stepanovich Martynushkin (Russian: Иван Степанович Мартынушкин; born 18 January 1924) is a Russian World War II veteran and the last surviving liberator of the Auschwitz concentration camp, which he became after the death of David Dushman in 2021.

== Early life ==
Martynushkin was born on 18 January 1924 (Note: According to his passport, he was born on 23 December 1923.) in the village of Poshchupovo, Ryazan Governorate. (Note: Now the Rybnovsky District in the Ryazan Oblast) In 1942, he graduated from the Khabarovsk machine gun and mortar school. He was sent to the front in 1943. He served in the 1087th Rifle Regiment of the 322nd Rifle Division and initially commanded a machine gun company, then a machine gun platoon. He was wounded twice and received a concussion.

== The liberation of Auschwitz ==
On 27 January 1945 at the age of 21, Martynushkin was among the first Soviet soldiers who liberated the Auschwitz concentration camp.

=== Recollections ===
Decades after the liberation, Martynushkin shared recollections through interviews.

“It was huge. It went on and on for kilometers. We started to see groups of people when we reached the fence. They came up to us dressed in prison stripes, some had other clothes on top. ... After being in such a hell, constantly threatened by death, they were worn, depleted people. The only thing to them were those eyes that reflected a kind of joy — of being freed, the joy that hell had ended and they remained alive.” he said. ... Back then when we saw the ovens, our first thought was: ‘Oh well, so they are crematoriums. So people died and they didn’t bury them all.’ We didn’t know then that those ovens were specially built for the killing of people, to burn those who had been gassed, that kind of systematic killing.”

"We saw emaciated people -- very thin, tired, with blackened skin. They were dressed in all sorts of different ways -- someone in just a robe, someone else with a coat or a blanket draped over their robe. You could see happiness in their eyes. They understood that their liberation had come, that they were free."

"But what did I feel when I saw these people in the camp? I felt compassion and pity understanding how these people's fate unfolded. Because I could have ended up in the same situation. I fought in the Soviet army. I could have been taken prisoner and they could have also thrown me into the camp."

== Later life ==
Martynushkin turned 100 on 18 January 2024.
