= Polish Security Printing Works =

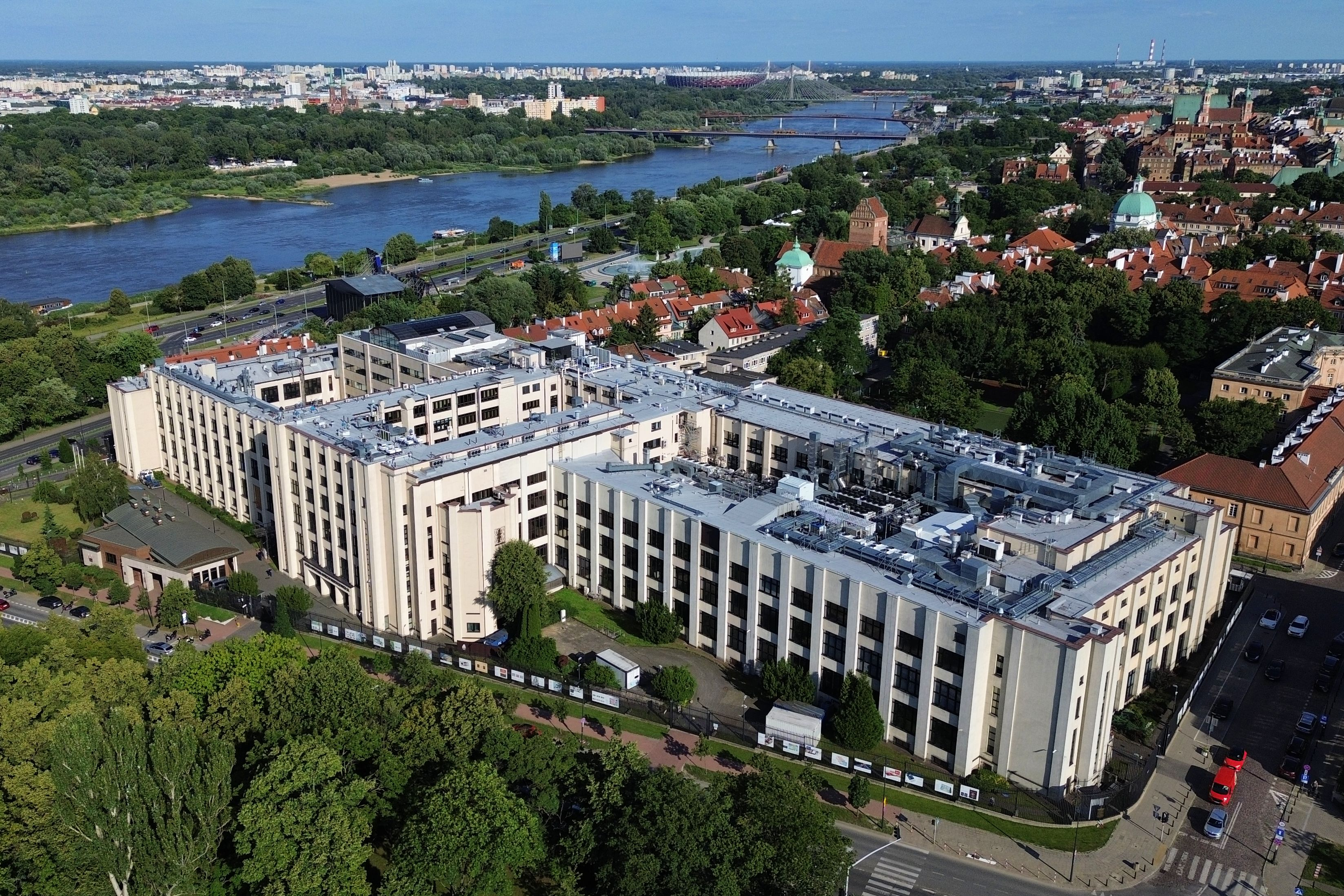
- Company headquarters
- Native name: Polska Wytwórnia Papierów Wartościowych S.A.
- Type: Spółka akcyjna
- Founded: 25 January 1919; 107 years ago
- Founder: Ignacy Paderewski (Prime Minister)
- Headquarters: Warsaw, Poland
- Website: www.pwpw.pl

Polish Security Printing Works (Polish: Polska Wytwórnia Papierów Wartościowych S.A.; PWPW S.A.) is a sole-shareholder company of the State Treasury, a company engaged in the production of banknotes, documents, security prints, and IT systems. Since January 2017, the Minister of Internal Affairs and Administration has exercised corporate supervision over the company. Since 2006, the company has been on the list of Euro banknotes producers accredited by the European Central Bank. The company headquarters is located at 1 Romana Sanguszki Street in Warsaw.

== History ==
The origins of the Polish Security Printing Works were closely linked to the history of independent Poland. After the end of World War I, the authorities of the Second Polish Republic began to reorganize the currency systems inherited from the occupying powers. The production of its own banknotes and documents was intended to emphasize independence and be a part of the new identity of independent Poland. On January 25, 1919, the government of Ignacy Jan Paderewski passed a resolution establishing the State Graphic Works. The enterprise was founded on the basis of the printing houses of J. Hirszowicz on Aleje Jerozolimskie and A. Hurkiewicz in Mariensztat, as well as the paper mill of the Mokotów Prison.

In 1920, the plant produced the first banknote with a denomination of 100 Polish marks.

On May 26, 1925, Treasury Minister Władysław Grabski signed an agreement with the Polish Bank, which provided for the establishment of a company with the participation of the central bank and the State Treasury. As a result, on July 10, 1926, the State Graphic Works were transformed into the Polish Security Printing Works. That same year, construction began on the company's new headquarters on Sanguszki Street in Warsaw. Work on the building, designed by Antoni Dygat, was completed in 1929.

By July 1939, the Printing Works employed 560 people.

=== World War II ===
From 1940, during the German occupation, the Underground Banknote Factory (PWB) operated on the factory premises, clandestinely producing banknotes and legalization documents for the Polish Underground State. In early 1944, PWB was transformed into an independent combat unit, PWB/17/S.

After the outbreak of the Warsaw Uprising, insurgents recaptured the factory building from the Germans, capturing a significant amount of weapons and food supplies. PWPW became one of the insurgents' redoubts in the Old Town. On August 27, 1944, a German attack by 1,600 soldiers supported by armored vehicles took place, facing approximately 200 insurgents. After fierce fighting for every floor of the building, the insurgents abandoned the PWPW premises on August 28, 1944.

=== The Postwar Years ===
With the establishment of the Polish People's Republic in accordance with a decree issued on November 10, 1945, the State Security Printing Works was established, and by order of the Minister of Treasury of April 28, 1947, the state-owned enterprise PWPW was granted a statute. In 1946, reconstruction of the bomb-damaged building on Sanguszki Street began. At that time, banknote and document production was moved to Łódź. Construction work was completed in 1950, and production returned to Warsaw. Following the monetary reform, PWPW printed new banknotes for circulation and security documents. In 1975, the first banknote in the "Great Poles" series was issued. It was a 500 złoty banknote with the image of Tadeusz Kościuszko, printed at PWPW. Subsequent denominations were introduced in subsequent years (until 1994). The final banknote in this series was the 2,000,000 złoty banknote with the image of Ignacy Jan Paderewski. Andrzej Heidrich designed all banknotes in this series. Since 1998, PWPW has been printing banknotes from a new series called "Rulers of Poland".

In 2016, at the initiative of its management, the company was "entrusted to God through the Immaculate Heart of Mary".

== Operation ==
=== Banknotes ===
PWPW produces circulation and collector banknotes of the Polish złoty for the National Bank of Poland, as well as banknotes for central banks of other countries, such as Slovakia, Georgia, Guatemala, Paraguay, Honduras, the Dominican Republic, and Djibouti.

=== Documents and IT Systems ===
Identification documents: blank Polish identity card, which are then personalized at the Document Personalization Center of the Ministry of Interior and Administration; Polish biometric passports – a passport booklet with a microchip sewn into the cover, into which biometric data is entered at the Ministry of Interior and Administration; ID cards; and documents for foreigners (e.g., residence cards). PWPW also produces passports for Lithuania, Armenia and Bangladesh.

Vehicle documents: driver's licenses, vehicle registration certificates, vehicle logs, window and license plate legalization stickers, ADR certificates, digital tachograph cards, and the digital tachograph system – for Poland, Armenia, Georgia and Azerbaijan.

In addition to printing products, PWPW also offers electronic services (including through its subsidiaries) such as the Sigillum Trust Services Center (e-signature), the Polish Procurement Platform, and operates the Vehicle and Driver (PIK) and Info-car systems, the Passport Information System (PSI), and the Central Football Fan Identification System implemented for the Polish Ekstraklasa.

=== Secure Paper and Printed Materials ===
PWPW produces postage stamps for the Polish Post, excise stamps for the Ministry of Finance, along with an excise tax band identification system. It also produces shares, bonds, diplomas, and vouchers. PWPW exports watermarked security paper, including: Austria, Greece, the Netherlands, France, the USA and Turkey.

=== Plastic Cards ===
PWPW is a manufacturer of plastic and polycarbonate cards (including bank cards and ID cards).

=== Research and Development Activities ===
The work carried out at PWPW has resulted in several proprietary solutions for document security, such as e-DataPage – a rigid polycarbonate personalized page containing a microchip, used in the production of biometric passports; Extreme ID – an identification card containing a high-temperature-resistant metal identification element, allowing personal data to be read even if the document has been exposed to fire (this solution was first used in identification cards for miners); PCP – a color personalization technology for polycarbonate cards that allows for the insertion of a color photo into the multi-layer structure of the card (preventing document forgery without visible signs of tampering) – used, among other applications, in Polish driving licenses; TLE – transparent laser engraving – used on Polish ID cards and driver's licenses.

The quarterly "Człowiek i Dokumenty" (Man and Documents) has been published since 2016. This specialized journal addresses the topic of documents in the citizen security system, with particular emphasis on legal, administrative, and economic aspects.

=== Foundation ===
On June 3, 2016, in the presence of Juliusz Kulesza, a Home Army soldier and participant in the uprising at the PWPW, the PWPW Board signed the founding act of the Reduta Foundation. In 2023, the foundation was awarded the Pro Patria Medal.
