= Ellsworth Johnson =

U.S. Army veteran (1923–2023)

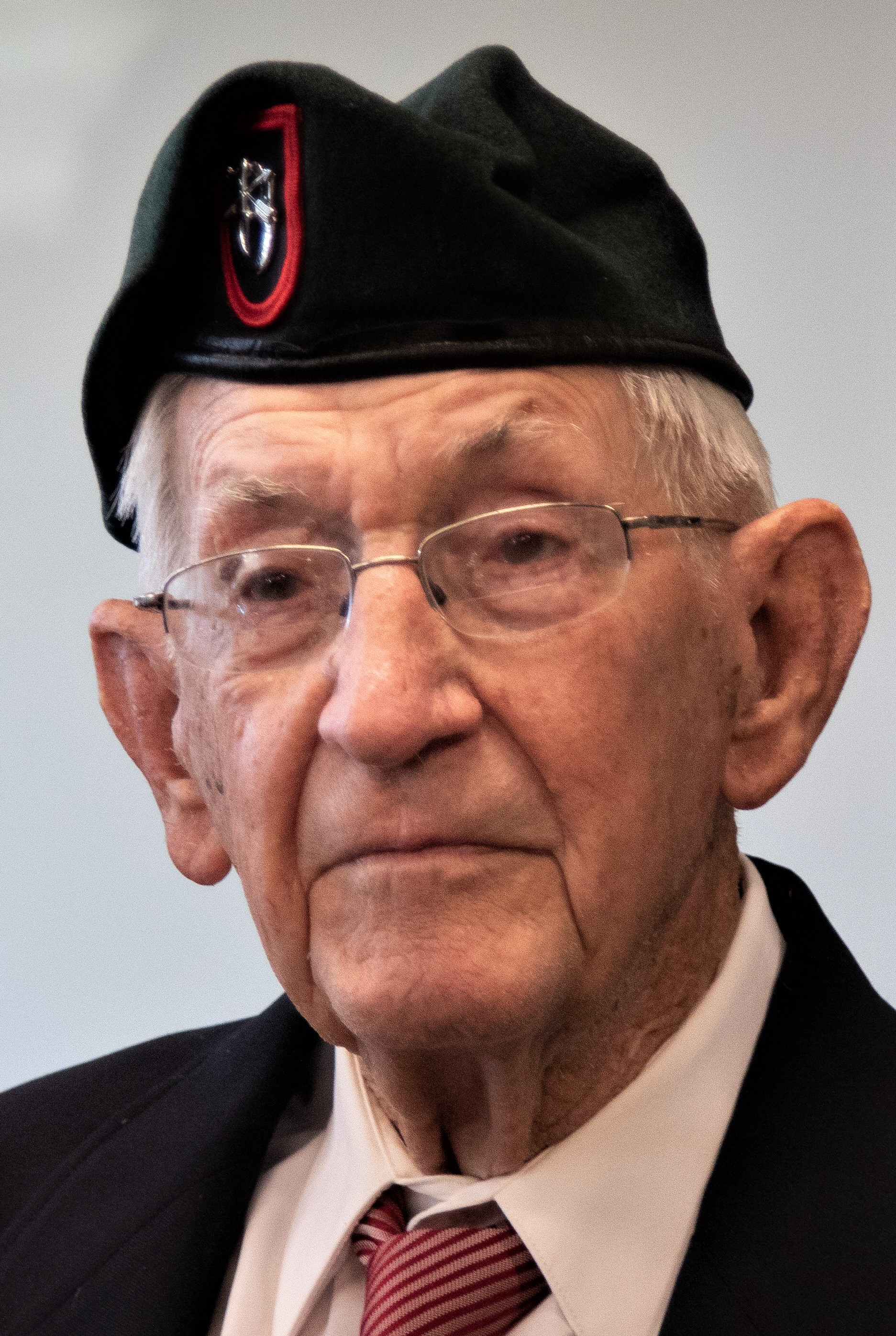
- Johnson in 2023
- Born: 5 July 1923; Ohio, U.S.
- Died: 30 September 2023 (aged 100); Zeeland, Michigan, U.S.
- Spouse: Jeanette DeBoer (m. 1947; died 2021)
- Children: 3
- Military career
- Allegiance: United States
- Branch: OSS OG
- Service years: 1943–1945
- Rank: Technician 4th Grade
- Nickname: Al
- Conflicts: World War II; European theater; Pacific theater

Ellsworth Johnson (5 July 1923 – 30 September 2023) was an American World War II veteran who served in the Operational Group Command branch of the Office of Strategic Services. He is believed to have been the last living member of the OSS.

== Early life ==
Ellsworth Johnson was born in an army hospital in Ohio to John and Marie Johnson. He was of Swedish and Dutch descent. He was educated at Central High School in Grand Rapids in 1942 and was drafted into the U.S. military in 1943.

== Career in the military ==
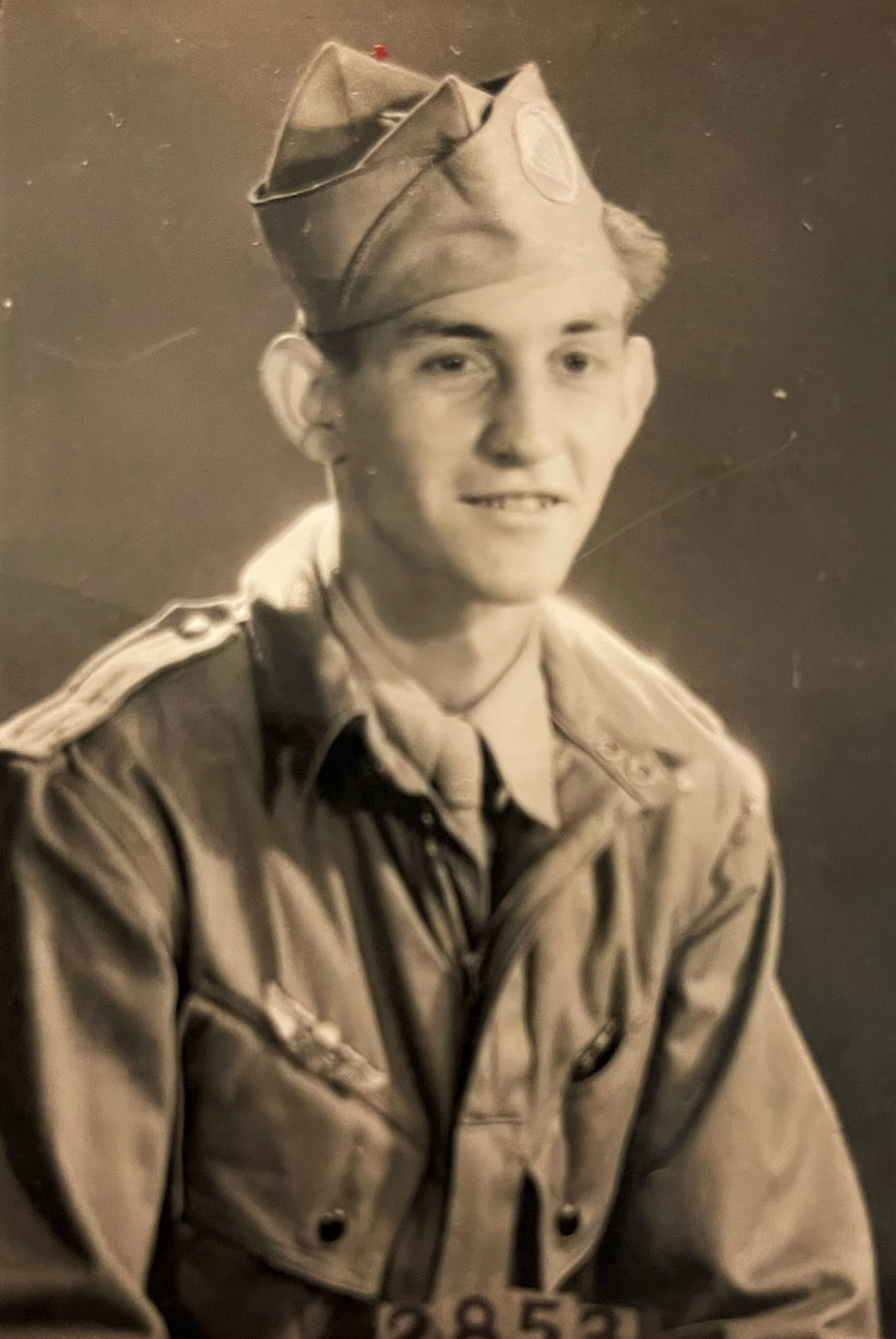
Johnson in 1943

Although Johnson was originally trained as a medic, he did not like the role of being a "bedpan jockey", so he volunteered for the OSS and was trained in North Africa. He was then placed in a French operational group after training.

In August 1944, Johnson, alongside his 25-man team code-named "Patrick", parachuted behind German enemy lines. They successfully captured a hydroelectric plant and a dam located near Eguzon with the help of the French Resistance inside German-occupied territory.

After serving in France for about a month, Johnson volunteered to serve in the Pacific Theatre alongside his fellow soldiers in July 1945. He trained and worked with the 2nd Chinese Commando and led an assault against a Japanese garrison residing in a Chinese town. They failed to take over the town, but the opposition took major casualties.

== Post-military ==
Following the surrender of the Japanese in August 1945, Johnson was discharged from the military alongside his fellow OSS soldiers. After the discharge, he earned an associate degree from Grand Rapids Junior College and continued to work as a machinery and beauty supply salesman.

In 1947, Johnson married Jeanette DeBoer and had three children together. DeBoer died in 2021. He wrote a memoir in 2019 titled Behind Enemy Lines: The O.S.S. in World War II, detailing his experiences in the war. Johnson died on 30 September 2023 in Zeeland, Michigan. He was the oldest survivor of the OSS at 100 years old.

== Awards ==
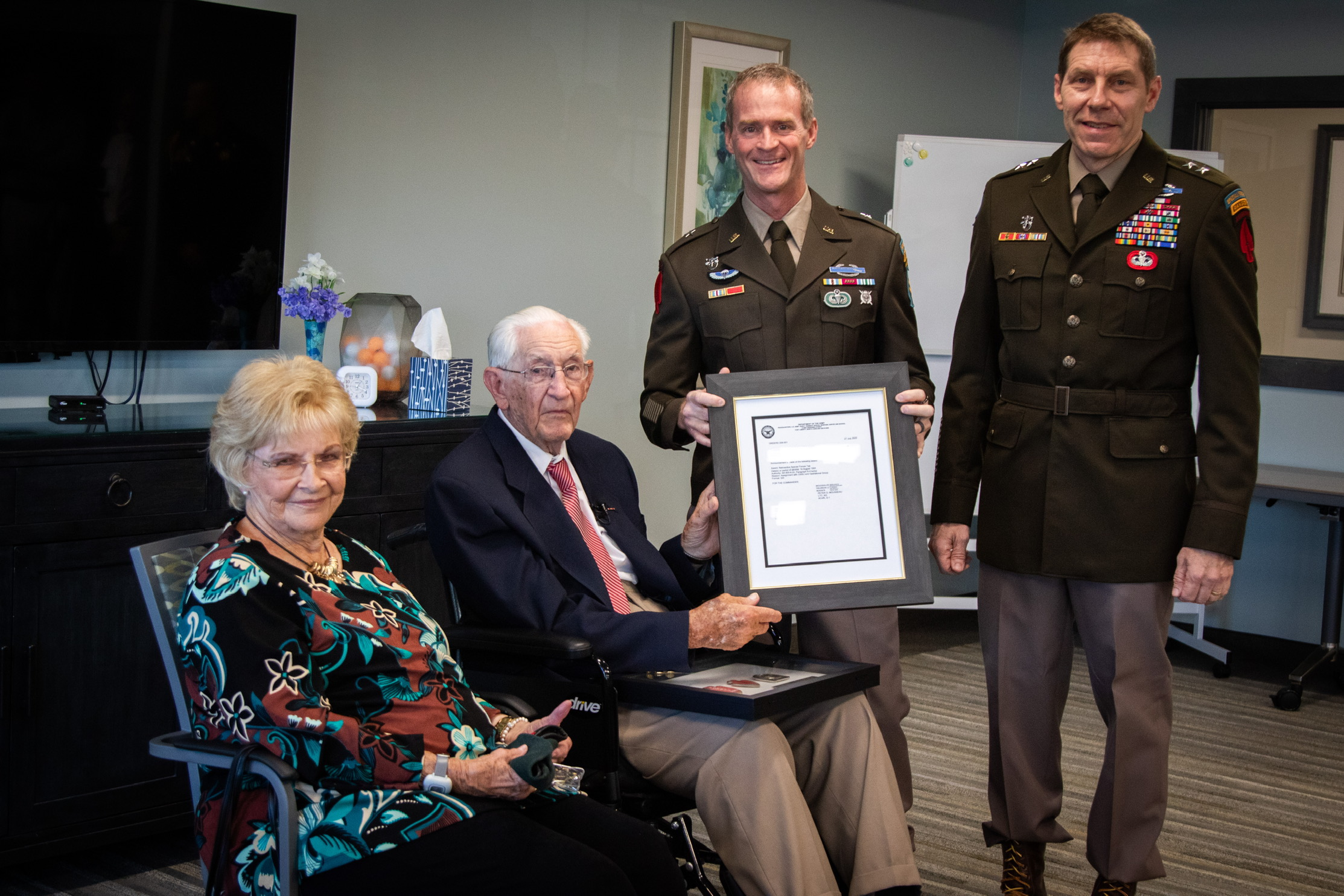
Johnson (center left) being awarded the Tab and Beret in his nursing home in 2023

Johnson received two Bronze Star Medals after his experience as a Technician 4th Grade in World War II. He was commissioned as an honorary colonel in the Chinese Nationalist Army. He had also received a Congressional Gold Medal due to his service in the OSS. He was also awarded the Legion of Honour Medal from France due to his service on their territory. In 2023, he received an Army Special Forces Tab and a Green Beret following a ceremony in his assisted living center in Zeeland.

== See also ==
- List of last surviving World War II veterans
