= Jale Bainisika =

Fijian military officer (died 2020)

- Born: April 16, 1915; Ovea, Tailevu Province, Fiji
- Died: February 15, 2020 (aged 105); Tailevu Province, Fiji
- Burial place: Raralevu Cemetery
- Military career
- Allegiance: Fiji
- Branch: Royal Fiji Military Forces
- Service years: 1944–1945
- Conflicts: World War II
- Awards: 1939–1945 Star; Pacific Star; War Medal 1939–1945

Jale Bainisika (16 April 1915 – 15 February 2020) was a Fijian military officer and the oldest and the last surviving veteran of World War II from Fiji. He fought in the Malayan campaign, the Solomon Islands campaign, and the Bougainville campaign.

He was one of the 30 military personnel who voluntarily became a part of the 1st Commando Unit to work with the United States Army for spying on opponents during World War II in Guadalcanal. Bainisika was also one of the first Fijian to be assigned by Fiji Commandos with duties on spying on opponent.

== Biography ==
Bainisika was born in Ovea, Tailevu Province, to father Kolinio Waqalevu and mother Raijieli Lavenivesi. He enlisted in the Fiji Infantry Regiment on October 7, 1942 and became a member of the 3rd Battalion. On March 12, 1944 he departed on his first active duty to the Solomon Islands, after receiving a message from Ratu George Kadavulevu. He returned on September 7, 1944 and was honourably discharged from the service on October 17, 1945.

Bainisika was awarded the 1939–1945 Star Medals, Pacific Star Medal and the War Medal.

He was married to Ilivula Ilimaina Bai; his wife and five children all predeceased him.
