= Clarence Beavers =

American United States Army sergeant

Clarence Hylan Beavers
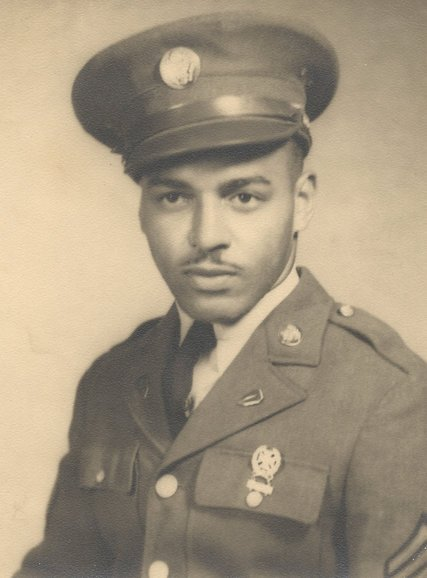
- Sergeant Clarence H. Beavers
- Born: June 12, 1921; New York City, U.S.
- Died: December 4, 2017 (aged 96); Huntington, New York, U.S.
- Burial place: Calverton National Cemetery
- Military career
- Allegiance: United States
- Branch: United States Army
- Service years: 1941–1945
- Rank: Sergeant
- Unit: 555th Parachute Infantry Battalion
- Conflicts: World War II: Operation Firefly

Clarence Hylan Beavers (June 12, 1921 – December 4, 2017) was an American United States Army sergeant and paratrooper who served with the first all-black airborne unit, the 555th Parachute Infantry Battalion, during World War II. He was part of the groundbreaking group of black paratroopers assigned to the 555th Parachute Infantry Battalion also known as the "Triple Nickles" and later "Smoke Jumpers" at Fort Benning in Georgia.

During the 1940s, army posts in the south were largely segregated. Beavers later told stories about how members of the unit were not allowed to use the post exchange or mess hall, a privilege even Italian and German prisoners of war being held there were allowed.

The unit served stateside, mostly on the West Coast, protecting against Japanese fire balloons, which were described as the world’s first intercontinental-range airborne weapons — giant bomb-laden balloons launched from Japan and aimed at North America.

Beavers died on December 4, 2017, at his home in Huntington, Long Island of a coronary related illness. He was 96 and interred at Calverton National Cemetery.
