= Dmytro Marusiak =

Ukrainian soldier and Soviet political prisoner (1925–2026)

- Дмитро Михайлович Марусяк
- Born: 2 July 1925; Korshiv, Stanisławów Voivodeship, Second Polish Republic
- Died: 24 October 2026 (aged 101); Lisky, Kolomyia Raion, Ivano-Frankivsk Oblast, Ukraine
- Military career
- Allegiance: Germany (1944–1945); Soviet Union (1945–1947)
- Branch: Waffen-SS (14th Galician Division); Soviet Army
- Service years: 1944–1947
- Rank: Schütze
- Conflicts: World War II * Eastern Front

Dmytro Mykhailovych Marusiak (Ukrainian: Дмитро Михайлович Марусяк; 2 July 1925 – 24 October 2026) was a Ukrainian soldier, centenarian, and former Soviet political prisoner who served as an anti-aircraft artilleryman in the 14th Galician Division (1st Ukrainian Division of the Ukrainian National Army). Following the death of Zenon Vrublevskyi, Marusiak was regarded as the last surviving veteran of the division in Ukraine.

== Biography ==
=== Early life ===
Dmytro Marusiak was born on 2 July 1925 into a large peasant family with five sons in the village of Korshiv in the historical region of Pokuttia (now in Kolomyia Raion, Ivano-Frankivsk Oblast, Ukraine), then part of the Second Polish Republic. He completed seven grades of the local rural school.

During World War II, under German occupation, Marusiak and his brother Vasyl were forcibly deported as Ostarbeiter (forced laborers) to work in Nazi Germany. While working at a dairy farm in Austria owned by a farmer who had previously lived in the United States and was critical of the Nazi regime, Marusiak received leave (Urlaub) and returned home shortly before the Eastern Front reached Galicia. Amid the presence of Soviet partisans (including Sydir Kovpak's detachments) and approaching combat, an acquaintance from the neighboring village of Honchariv suggested that he enlist in the Galician Division.

=== Military service and Soviet imprisonment ===
Marusiak underwent medical screening alongside nearly 1,800 volunteers. After waiting around three months for his call-up, he traveled with a companion from Kolomyia to Lviv and onward toward the German border, eventually reaching Tyrol, where he received his official enlistment notice.

Initially sent to Styria in Austria, he served on guard and patrol duties before completing military training in the Alps and being assigned to an anti-aircraft artillery unit of the division. By coincidence during training, he did not receive the standard Waffen-SS blood-group tattoo under his arm, a circumstance that later saved his life during Soviet captivity.

At the end of the war in Graz, Austria, Marusiak entered the Soviet occupation zone. Successfully concealing his service in the Galician Division, he was immediately conscripted into the Soviet Army and served for two years with the Soviet military contingent in Romania. Unwilling to remain in Soviet service, he deserted from his unit, was apprehended by Soviet security organs, and was sentenced by a military tribunal to forced labor in the Gulag camps of Khabarovsk Krai in the Russian Soviet Federative Socialist Republic.

=== Later life and death ===
Following his release from the camps, Marusiak returned to Prykarpattia. Due to the threat of persecution by the KGB, he kept his wartime service in the division secret for decades.

In his later years, he resided in the village of Lisky in Kolomyia Raion and was a member of the Lviv branch of the Brotherhood of Former Soldiers of the 1st Ukrainian Division of the Ukrainian National Army. He celebrated his 100th birthday on 2 July 2025 and his 101st birthday in July 2026.

Marusiak died in Lisky on 24 October 2026 at the age of 101, and was buried there on 25 October 2026.
