= 555th Parachute Infantry Battalion (United States) =

All-black U.S. Army airborne unit (1943–1947)

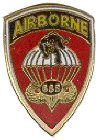
- Pocket patch of the Triple Nickle Association
- Active: 19 December 1943 – 15 December 1947
- Country: United States of America
- Branch: National Army
- Type: Airborne Infantry
- Role: Airborne Firefighters
- Size: Battalion
- Part of: XVIII Airborne Corps, 82nd Airborne Division
- Garrison/HQ: Pendleton Army Airfield, Oregon
- Nickname: The Triple Nickles/Smoke Jumpers
- Engagements: World War II (Mainland USA)

Commanders
- Notable commanders: James M. Gavin (Post World War II)

The 555th Parachute Infantry Battalion, nicknamed The Triple Nickles, was an all-black airborne unit of the United States Army during World War II.

== History ==
=== Activation ===
The unit was activated as a result of a recommendation made in December 1942 by the Advisory Committee on Negro Troop Policies, chaired by the Assistant Secretary of War, John J. McCloy. In approving the committee's recommendation for a black parachute battalion, Chief of Staff General George C. Marshall decided to start with a company, and on 25 February 1943, the 555th Parachute Infantry Company was constituted.

On 19, 1943, Headquarters, Army Ground Forces, authorized the activation of the company as an all-black unit with black officers as well as black enlisted men. All unit members were to be volunteers, with an enlisted cadre to be selected from personnel of the 92nd Infantry Division at Fort Huachuca, Arizona.

The company was officially activated on 30 December 1943, at Fort Benning, Georgia. After several months of training, the unit moved to Camp Mackall, North Carolina, where it was reorganized and redesignated on 25 November 1944, as Company A of the newly formed 555th Parachute Infantry Battalion.

=== World War II ===
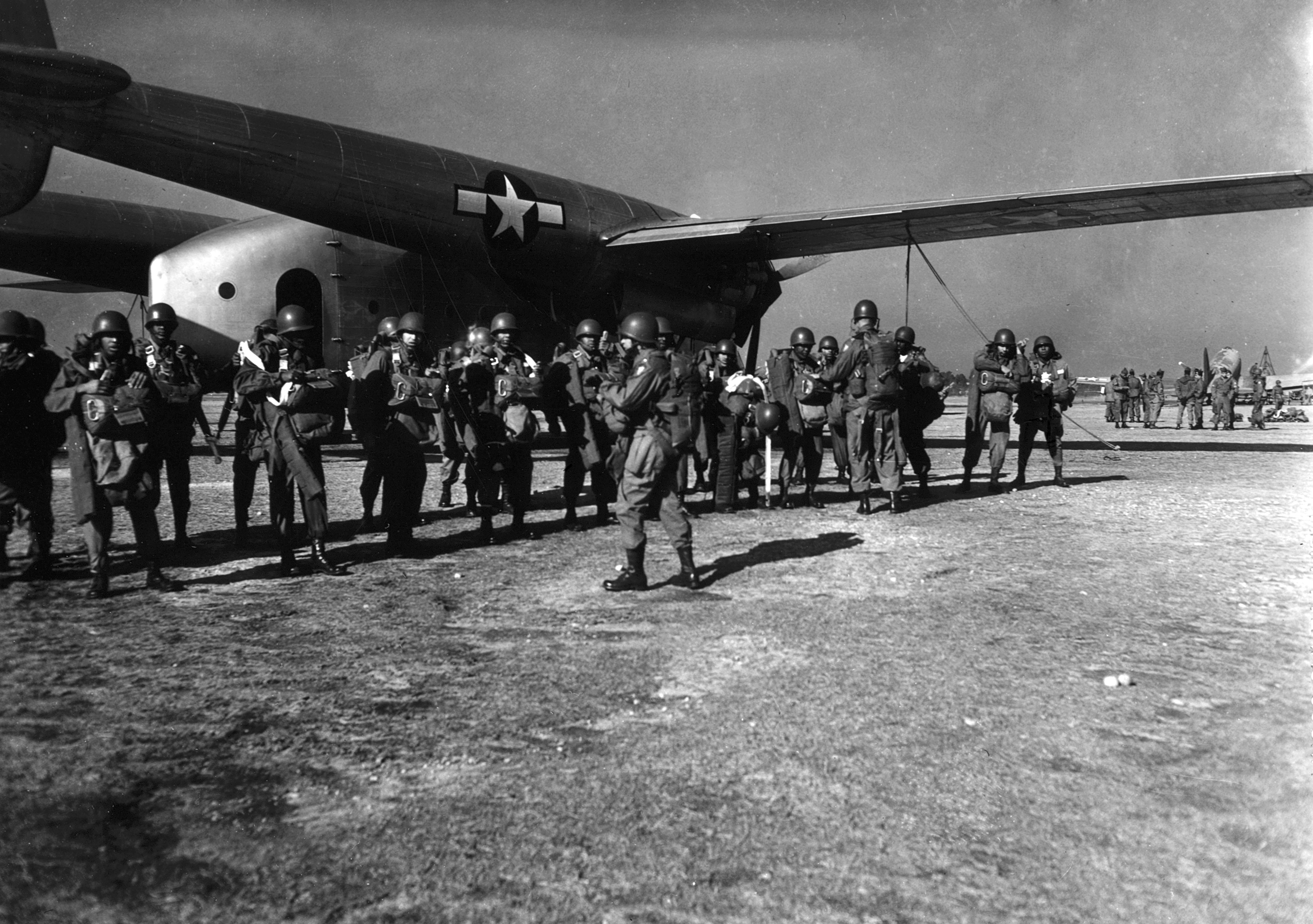
Members of the battalion are briefed before takeoff from Fort Dix in 1947

The battalion did not serve overseas during World War II, primarily because it never reached full strength for an Airborne Infantry Battalion. In reaction to the German counterattack that began the Battle of Bulge, the Airborne Command considered reorganizing the 555th PIB as a single reinforced Airborne Rifle Company, and sending it to Europe to reinforce the battered Airborne units already there. However, before this could happen the crisis had passed, and the 555th PIB was instead alerted for deployment to the West Coast. The men of the 555th PIB hoped that they would get into the war against the Japanese, but that was not their new mission. According to Sergeant Walter Morris, "It was a secret mission called Operation Firefly. We thought we were going overseas to [Gen. Douglas] MacArthur's theater." It wasn't until they arrived in Oregon, in May 1945, that they learned they would be fighting the Japanese on the fire line in the Western United States.

During the winter of 1944–45, the Japanese sent 9,300 Fu-Go balloon bombs toward North America. It was believed 1,000 succeeded in reaching the United States; 312 balloon bombs have been found. After three days, each balloon dropped an incendiary bomb. The balloon bombs employed a ballast system designed to maintain an average altitude of 30,000 feet. Incendiary bombs would be dropped one at a time (four 11-pounders) and a single high-explosive bomb (33 pounds) would be dropped followed by a self-destruct device. In order to conceal the efficacy of these attacks, the missions of the 555th PIB was kept clandestine in nature. By January 1945, however, both Time and Newsweek reported the mission.

Although there were no significant wildfires, small ones nonetheless developed from some of the balloon bombs being detonated suddenly after landing on the forests undisturbed for weeks or months mainly in California, Oregon, or Idaho. Stationed at Pendleton Field, Oregon (formerly the base of the pilots and aircraft selected for the Doolittle Raid on Japan), with a detachment in Chico, California, unit members participated in fire-fighting missions throughout the Pacific Northwest during the summer and fall of 1945. The 555th worked on twenty-eight fires during the 1945 season. Of these, fifteen fires were "jumped" or parachuted to. While some United States Forest Service reports refer to some employees as smokejumpers, the 555th were reported as paratroopers on all fire reports. The only fatality in the unit died while jumping on 6 August 1945. The activities of the unit & Project Firefly were reported in the fourth episode of Your AAF, 'Firefighting Paratroopers' segment broadcast September 13, 1945, which can be found on YouTube and most old-time radio websites. it includes a brief interview by AAF reporter Sergeant Douglas Cooley with jumpmaster Captain Richard Williams, executive officer of the paratroop battalion, in a C47 piloted by Colonel Frank McNees, who commanded the 435th group of the 9th troop carrier command which carried the first airborne divisions over the beaches of Normandy, & later across the Rhine.

The 555th Parachute Infantry Battalion was nicknamed the "Triple Nickles" because of its numerical designation and the selection of 17 of the original 20-member "colored test platoon" from the 92nd Infantry (Buffalo) Division. Hence, the origin of the nickname, Buffalo Nickles. Not to be confused with the U.S. 5-cent coin that had a bison (buffalo) on it, which was first minted long before the war, the spelling derives from old English. Three buffalo nickels joined in a triangle or pyramid is the identifying symbol.

Soon after returning to Camp Mackall in October 1945, the 555th Parachute Infantry Battalion was transferred to Fort Bragg, North Carolina, its home for the next two years. During this period the unit was attached to the elite 82nd Airborne Division. When the battalion was inactivated on 15 December 1947, its men were all transferred into the 3d Battalion, 505th Parachute Infantry Regiment of the 82nd Airborne Division, which had been reduced to cadre strength to prepare for their arrival. Also on that date, the 505PIR was redesignated at the 505th Airborne Infantry Regiment.

Soon afterward, individual black paratroopers were transferred to units throughout the 82nd Airborne Division, making it the first integrated division in the US Army. The 555th PIB was formally disbanded 22 August 1950.

=== Inactivated ===
After its inactivation, many former 555th PIB members later fought in the Korean War in other units. First Lieutenant Harry Sutton, one of the battalion's former officers, died leading a rearguard action during the Hungnam evacuation and was decorated posthumously with the Silver Star. In 1950, a large number of former 555th PIB members volunteered to form the all-black 2nd Ranger Infantry Company (Airborne). While the 2nd RIC was attached to the 187th Airborne Regimental Combat Team, it made the combat jump at Munsan-Ni in March 1951, the first combat jump ever made by a US Army Ranger unit. This was the only combat jump ever made by an all-black unit as the Army was segregated by race at the time. President Harry Truman had ordered the military desegregated on July 26, 1948, but it was slow to comply with the order. The last all-black unit was disbanded in 1954.

Clarence H. Beavers, the first volunteer for the 555th, went on to a career in computer systems with the Veterans Administration and US Defense Department, and served as a volunteer firefighter in retirement.

Although not specifically named, an all-Black parachute unit is prominently mentioned in the 1948 novel Fire, by George R. Stewart. Jumping into an uncontrolled California forest fire, they fight it for several days alongside people of many ethnic backgrounds.

In John Ringo's Legacy of the Aldenata military science fiction series, the 555 PIR is reactivated as the 555th Mobile Infantry Regiment. The reborn "Triple Nickle" Regiment was one of the most highly decorated units in the Defense of Earth during the Posleen War.

The Triple Nickles is prominently featured in the historical novel, The Last Jump - A Novel of World War II by John E. Nevola.

The Triple Nickles are an important part of the book Jump into the Sky, written by Shelley Pearsall.

Sgt. Joe Harris of the 555th parachute infantry battalion died March 15, 2025 in Los Angeles in a hospital at the age of 108. He is believed to be one of the last surviving members of the 555th. Other triple nickels are still living in Fayetteville, NC according to the Samuel Collins chapter of the Triple Nickels president Janice Fisher-Robinson.

In 2026, veteran and conservationist Chad Brown wrote and directed the documentary, "Unseen", which follows five combat veterans on a 200-mile backpacking expedition along the Oregon Timber Trail honoring the Triple Nickle, retracing terrain in the Fremont-Winema National Forest the battalion protected during Operation Firefly.
