= Nikolai Mikhaylovich Belyaev =

Soviet WWII veteran

Nikolai Belyaev
- Николай Беляев
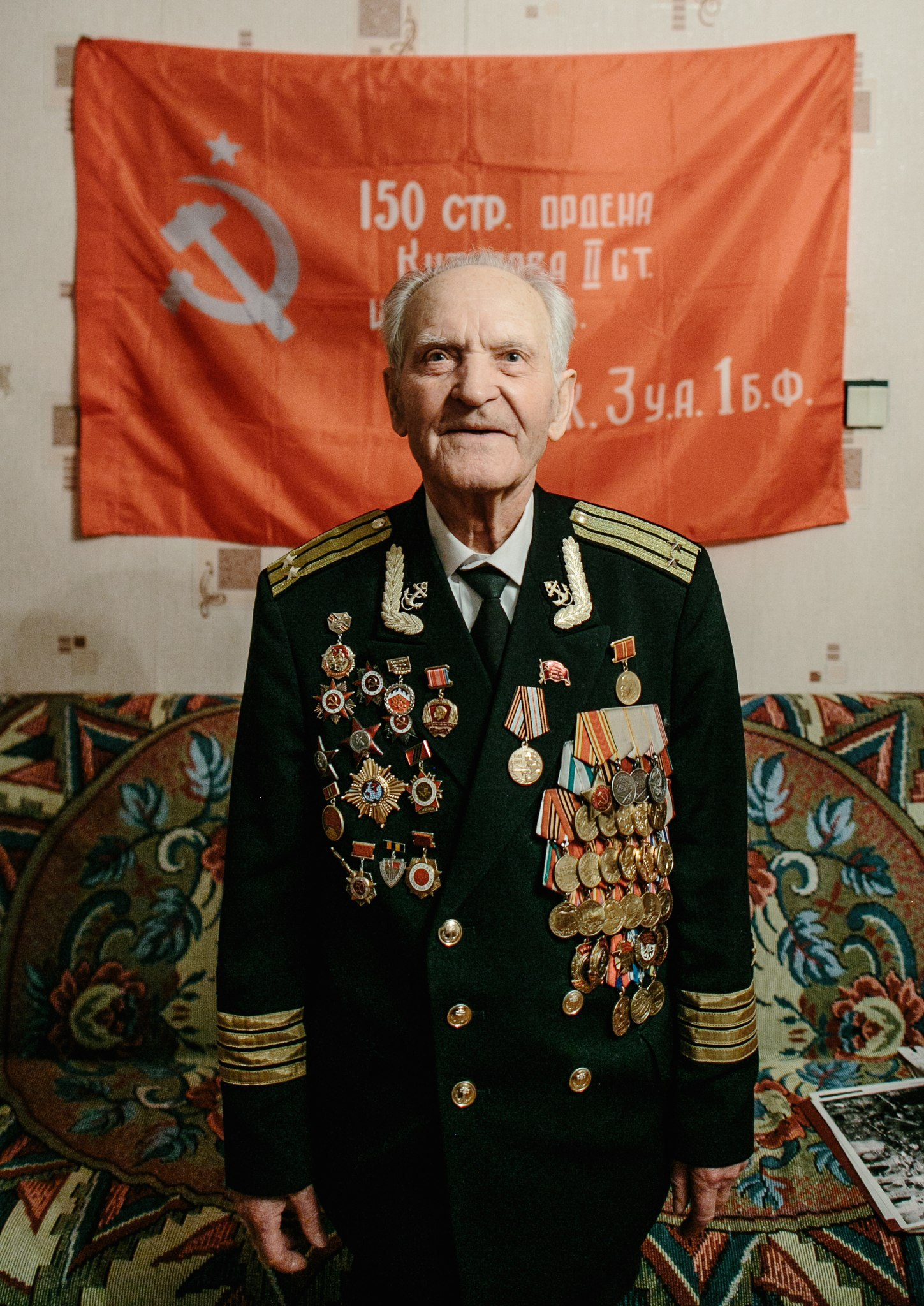
- Belyaev in 2015 in front of the Victory Banner
- Born: 22 October 1922; Kobenevo, Ostashkovsky Uyezd, Tver Governorate, Russian SFSR
- Died: 8 December 2015 (aged 93); Saint Petersburg, Russia
- Burial place: Serafimovskoe Cemetery
- Military career
- Branch: Infantry, later Navy
- Service years: 1941–1961
- Rank: Captain 2nd rank
- Unit: 756th Regiment of the 150th Rifle Division
- Conflicts: Eastern Front of World War II

Personal details
- Party: Communist Party of the Russian Federation (1993–)
- Other political affiliations: Communist Party of the Soviet Union (1942–1991)

Nikolai Mikhaylovich Belyaev (Russian: Николай Михайлович Беляев; 22 October 1922 – 8 December 2015) was a Soviet and Russian navy officer who fought in the Eastern Front of World War II. A 2nd rank Captain, he was among the last surviving people to have raided the Reichstag in the Battle of Berlin.

== Early life ==
Belyaev was born to a peasant family in Kobenevo, Ostashkovsky Uyezd, Tver Governorate, Russian SFSR. After eight grades of school, he started writing for the "Leninist Udarnik" newspaper. There, he met Yelizaveta Chaikina, during this time the secretary of Komsomol's Penovsky District.

== Military career ==
After World War II broke out, Belyaev signed up to the Penovsky District Military Komissariat as a volunteer soldier. A member of the Northern Front and later the Karelian Front, he fought in the Arctic Campaign in defence of Murmansk from 13 August 1941. From 16 August 1943, he was transferred to the Staraya-Russa Offensive of the Northwestern Front, now a senior sergeant. He was injured on 18 August, but he remained on the frontline until 21 August, commanding a 55 mm mortar squad, for which he was awarded the "For Battle Merit" Medal.

After recovery, he took officer classes and was thus named junior lieutenant. After returning to the active army as part of the 756th Rifle Regiment of the 150th Rifle Division of the 3rd Shock Army of the 2nd Baltic Front, he was wounded for the second time, lightly. He distinguished himself during the battles on the right bank of the Aiviekste, for which he was awarded the Order of the Patriotic War, 2nd Class.

In January 1945, the 3rd Shock Army was transferred to the 1st Belorussian Front. As part of his unit, Belyaev took part in the liberation of Warsaw. During the battles for the liberation of the city of Wangerin, he led soldiers in an attack, for which he was nominated for the Order of the Patriotic War, 1st Class, but was instead awarded the Order of the Red Star.

On 29 April 1945, for the skillful organization of Komsomol work in the regiment, Belyaev was nominated for the Order of the Patriotic War, 1st Class. He was awarded it after the victory, in June.

During the assault on the Reichstag, he was in the cover group that followed the banner group of Mikhail Yegorov and Meliton Kantaria, who raised the Victory Banner. Before that, during one of the attempts to install a homemade banner, his friend Pyotr Pyatnitsky was killed. After the capitulation of the Reichstag garrison, he left the inscription "Our Liza" on the wall of the building in memory of Liza Chaikina, who had been executed by the Nazis during the war.

== Party career ==
In 1942, he became a member of the Communist Party of the Soviet Union. After his officer classes, he was appointed to the komsomol of the frontline.

After the collapse of the Soviet Union, Belyaev did not change his beliefs and joined the Communist Party of the Russian Federation, regularly taking part in events organized by the Krasnoselsky District branch of the party. According to the recollections of Belyaev's relatives and friends, he remained a convinced communist until the end of his life.

== Later life ==
After the end of the war, Belyaev served in the Pacific Fleet. After completing his service, he worked in Leningrad at the Red Banner Textile Factory for about 40 years, until 2001. After retiring, Belyaev headed a sports and technical club. After the war, Belyaev repeatedly visited Berlin on the anniversaries of Victory Day.

On the day of his 90th anniversary, Belyaev fired the traditional midday ceremonial cannon shot from the Peter and Paul Fortress.

Belyaev died in Saint Petersburg on 8 December 2015 at age 93. The farewell ceremony for the veteran was held in the building of the Voskhod cinema. He was buried with military honors, with the participation of an honor guard company of the Western Military District, at the Serafimovskoe Cemetery. In many publications dedicated to Belyaev's death, he was mistakenly called the last living participant in the storming of the Reichstag, although in fact at the time of his death at least 10 other participants were still alive.

He was the last World War II veteran of Saint Petersburg.

== Awards and honors ==
Belyaev's awards and honors include:

- Order of the Patriotic War, 1st class(1945)
- Order of the Patriotic War, 2nd class (1944)
- 2 Orders of the Red Star (first from 1945)
- 2 Medals "For Battle Merit" (first from 1943)
- Medal "Veteran of Labour"
- Medal "For the Defence of the Soviet Transarctic"
- Medal "For the Capture of Berlin"

== Works cited ==
- Subbotin, Vasily (1975). Как кончаются войны. М.: Sovetsky pisatel. p. 318.
- Zinchenko, Fedor (1984). Герои штурма Рейхстага. Voenizdat. p. 190.
