= Jacques Lewis =

French veteran (1919–2024)

Jacques Pierre Lewis (1 March 1919 – 25 July 2024) was a French veteran of the Normandy landings. He is believed to have been the last surviving French veteran of the landings.

== Biography ==
Lewis was born on 1 March 1919 in Caudéran, in Bordeaux. After studying at Lycée Janson-de-Sailly, he started studying law at Sciences Po. When the Second World War broke out in September 1939, he joined the French Army, becoming a student officer. After training at the Auvours military camp, he participated in battles on the Loire River and at Fontainebleau during the Battle of France.

After the Germans occupied France, Lewis fled to Spain in December 1942, by crossing the Pyrenees on foot. He was arrested in Pamplona and imprisoned by Franco's regime. He managed to escape, and joined the Free French in London in July 1943, after first crossing to the United States on a boat flying the flag of Liberia.

With the rank of second lieutenant, he participated in the Normandy landings (D-Day) in the 2nd American Armoured Division, led by General Edward H. Brooks; he was selected to serve with the Americans because of his command of English in addition to French. On 6 June 1944, he landed on Utah Beach. He participated in the fights for the liberation of the village of Carentan, which lasted six days. He then fought in the Ardennes and then in Germany, helping to repatriate French prisoners of war. He ultimately obtained the rank of commander.

After the war, Lewis worked in the cosmetics industry, remaining discreet about his experiences as a soldier. From April 2018 until his death, he was a resident and dean of the Institut national des Invalides. He participated in the commemorations of the D-Day landings, especially in June 2019 (the occasion of the 75th anniversary), where he was joined by Léon Gautier. On 8 June 2024, he was present at the ceremony marking the 80th anniversary of the event, under the Arc de Triomphe, in the presence of United States President Joe Biden. He insisted that he be taken to the event in his wheelchair to participate in the ceremony and greet Biden and French President Emmanuel Macron.

He died on 25 July 2024, at the age of 105. President Macron paid tribute to him in a statement published by the Élysée on 30 July. A ceremony was held on 1 August at Saint-Louis-des-Invalides Cathedral. He is believed to have been the last living French veteran of the Allied landings on D-Day.
