= Friedrich Grade =

German engineer, naval officer and Nazi (1916–2023)

- Born: 29 March 1916; Büdelsdorf, Schleswig-Holstein, Kingdom of Prussia, German Empire
- Died: 13 October 2023 (aged 107); Bornheim, North Rhine-Westphalia, Germany
- Military career
- Allegiance: Nazi Germany; West Germany
- Branch: Kriegsmarine; German Navy
- Service years: 1935–1945; 1958–1974
- Rank: Captain (German Navy)
- Units: 7th U-boat Flotilla; 10th U-boat Flotilla
- Awards: German Cross in Gold; U-boat War Badge

Friedrich Wilhelm Ernst Grade (29 March 1916 − 13 October 2023) was a German engineer and naval officer. He was the last surviving member of the German submarine U-96, which achieved fame through Lothar-Günther Buchheim's 1973 novel Das Boot and the 1981 film adaptation.

== Biography ==
Joining the Kriegsmarine in 1935, Grade served aboard the cruiser Emden, a training ship, as an engineering cadet until 1936. During World War II, he was chief engineer (LI) of the U-boats U-96 and U-183.

Grade was the last surviving eyewitness to the submarine's patrols. In 2017, he published his hitherto unknown diaries, written during operations on U-96. He achieved Germany-wide awareness in 2018, when his story was picked up by the media as part of the remake of Das Boot.

After the end of his assignments on U-96, Grade completed two more patrols on U-183 and then trained U-boat crews as a technical instructor for the submarine training flotilla until the end of the war. In 1958, he was accepted into the newly formed German Navy to lead the development of new submarines there. In 1970, shortly before his retirement, he worked on the revision of Lothar-Günther Buchheim's novel Das Boot. When he retired in 1974, he held the rank of Kapitän zur See.

Grade was married in Eckernförde and had two children who were born during World War II. In his last years, he lived in a retirement home in Bornheim. Grade died on 13 October 2023, at the age of 107.
