= Léon Gautier (soldier) =

French veteran of D-Day (1922–2023)

Léon Gautier MBE
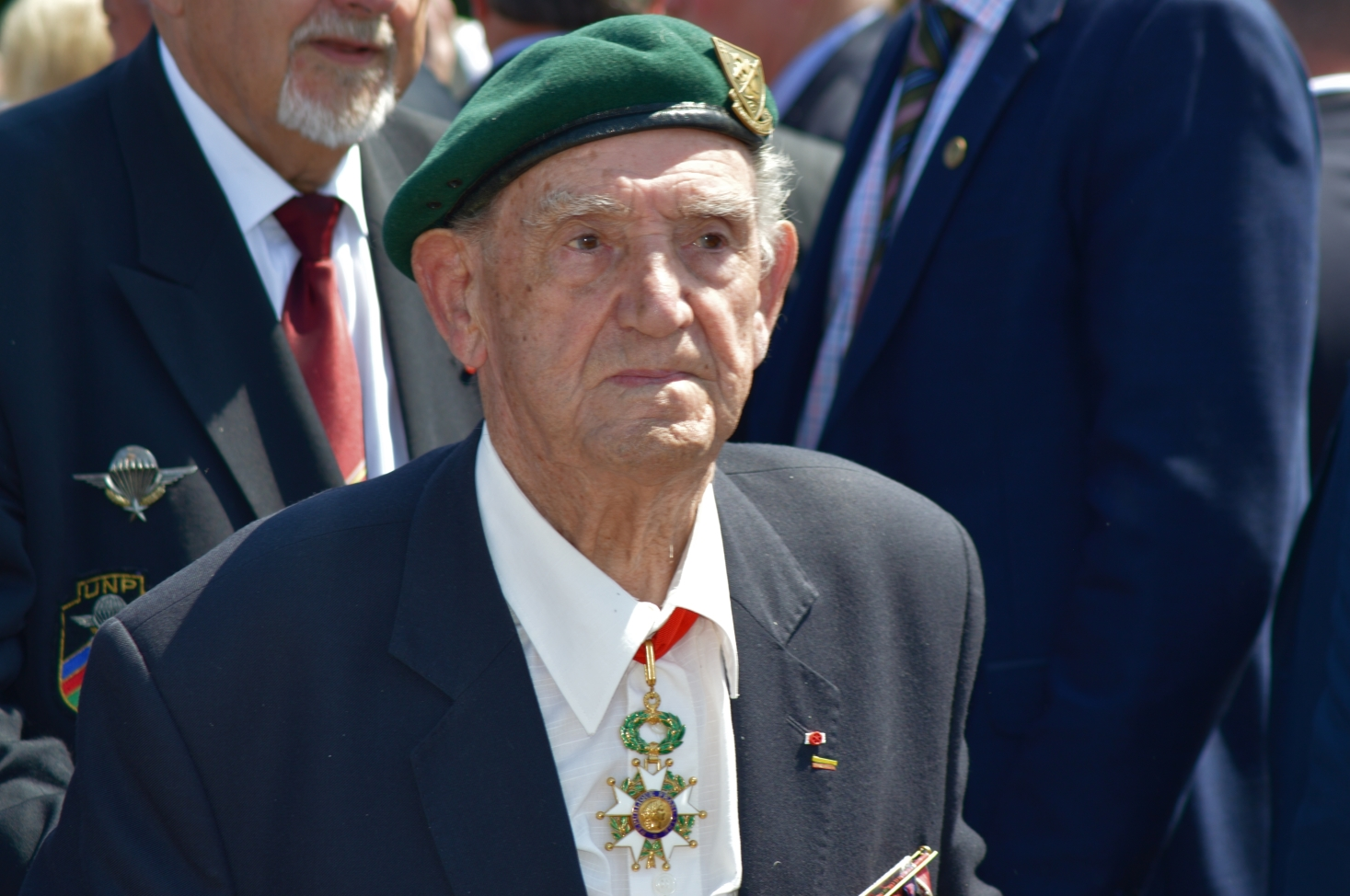
- Gautier in 2017
- Born: 27 October 1922 Rennes, Brittany, France
- Died: 3 July 2023 (aged 100) Caen, France
- Allegiance: France
- Branch: French Navy
- Conflicts: World War II
- Awards: Grand Officer Legion of Honour; Medaille medal; Croix de Guerre 1939-1945; Resistance Medal; Volunteer Combatant's Cross; Commemorative medal for voluntary service in Free France

Léon Gautier MBE (27 October 1922 – 3 July 2023) was a Free French soldier during the Second World War.

== Biography ==
=== Early life and military career ===
Gautier was born in Rennes, Brittany, in France, on 27 October 1922. At the start of the Second World War, he was working as an apprentice car body maker.

He enlisted in the French Navy at the age of 17, and took part in the defense of the port of Cherbourg and the mouth of the Vire in Normandy as a gunner on the battleship Courbet. He fled to the United Kingdom before the Nazi occupation of France. After learning about Free France in 1940, he decided to join Charles de Gaulle and participated in the 14 July 1940 parade in London with the Free French Naval Forces. Gautier also served on the merchant vessel Gallois and as a marine rifleman on the submarine Surcouf, which operated in Africa and the Middle East.

He fought with the 1er Bataillon de Fusiliers Marins Commandos, led by Lieutenant-Commander Philippe Kieffer, in the Congo, Syria, and Lebanon before taking part in the invasion of Normandy, where more than half his unit was killed. He later injured his ankle, which led him to have limited participation in the remainder of the war.

=== After the war ===
After the war, Gautier became a campaigner for peace, calling war a "misery" that "ends with widows and orphans". He worked as a panel beater in the United Kingdom for seven years, before moving to Cameroon and Nigeria for another seven years. He later settled in the Norman town of Ouistreham in 1992. He became the president of the French branch of the Association of Commandos. He maintained a friendship with former German soldier, Johannes Borner, with their friendship being the subject of a book by Jean-Charles Stasi.

In June 2019, Gautier participated in commemorating the 75th anniversary of D-Day where he was joined by fellow French D-Day veteran Jacques Lewis.

== Personal life and death ==
Gautier was married to Dorothy Banks, whom he met while stationed in the United Kingdom in September 1943, until her death in 2016. They had two daughters.

He died on 3 July 2023, at age 100, after being hospitalized in Caen for a lung infection. In response to his death, French president Emmanuel Macron described Gautier as having "united the virtues of a warrior and those of a peacemaker."

== Honours ==
Gautier is a member of the Order of the British Empire and a Grand Officer of the Legion of Honour. He had also been awarded with the Médaille militaire, the Croix de Guerre 1939–1945 (with 2 citations), the Resistance Medal, the Volunteer Combatant's Cross, and the Commemorative medal for voluntary service in Free France.
