= Juliusz Kulesza =

Polish Warsaw Uprising participant (1928–2025)

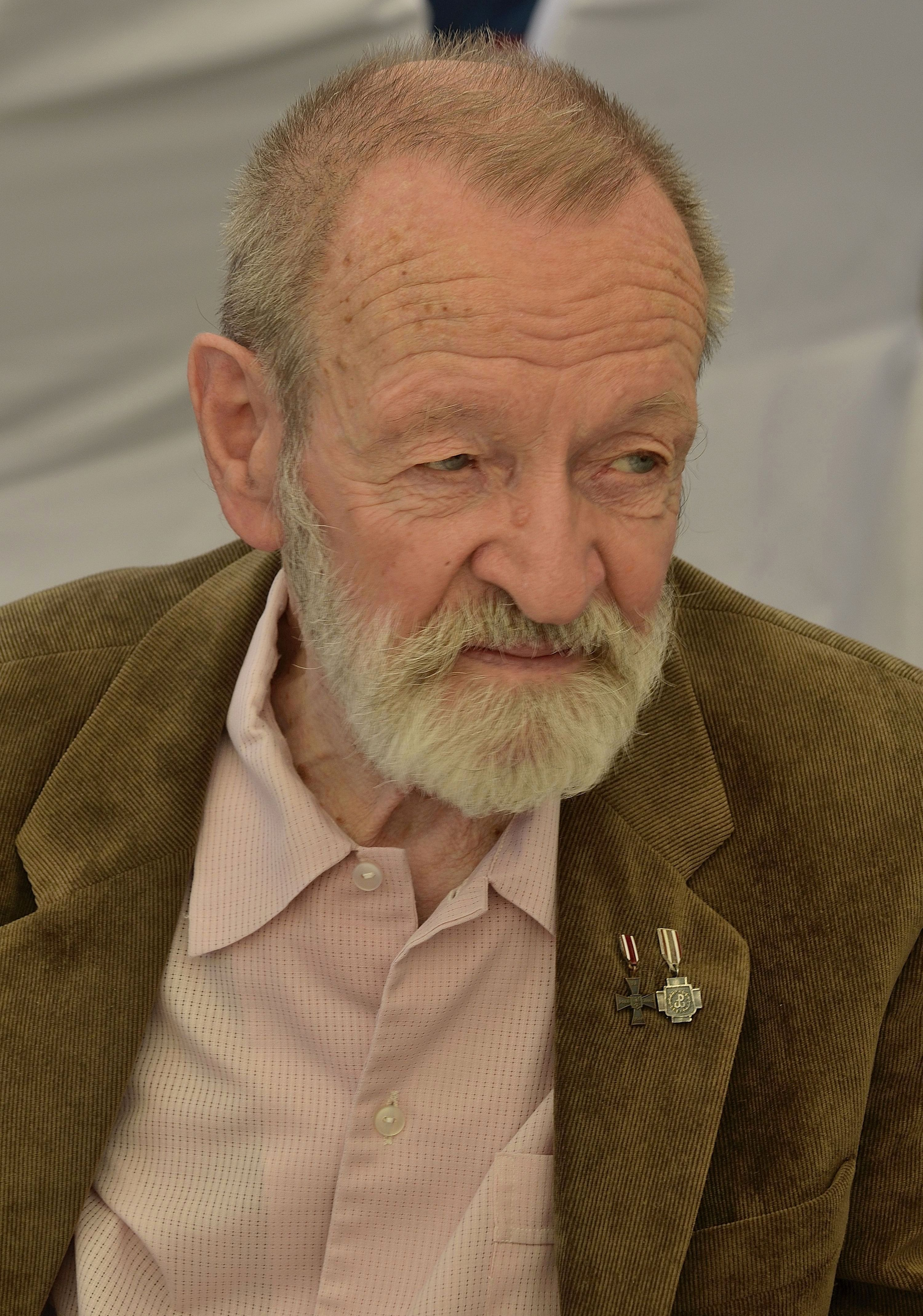
- Kulesza in 2015
- Born: 19 May 1928; Warsaw, Second Polish Republic
- Died: 5 February 2025 (aged 96); Warsaw, Poland
- Resting place: Bródno Cemetery
- Occupations: Graphic Designer and Writer
- Known for: Warsaw Uprising participant

Juliusz Kulesza (19 May 1928 – 5 February 2025) was a Polish graphic designer, writer, and participant of the Warsaw Uprising, an officer in the Polish Army and an author of books on World War II.

== Personal life ==
Kulesza grew up in Warsaw, mostly in the Old Town and Żoliborz. His parents worked at the Polish Security Printing Works (PWPW) during the interwar period. He spent the occupation in Warsaw as a student of secret junior high school classes and an evening printing school. In the years 1942–1944, he was an apprentice draftsman at PWPW (renamed Staatsdruckerei). He fought in the Old Town in the duration of the Warsaw Uprising. Soldier of the Home Army in the independent group PWB/17/S (Underground Banknote Factory), participant in the battles for the PWPW redoubt, awarded the Cross of Valor. His nickname was "Julek". After the uprising, he escaped from the Dulag 121 camp in Pruszków.

In the years 1945–1948 he lived in Łódź, where he passed his matura at the Secondary School named after Gabriel Narutowicz. In the summer of 1948 he returned to Warsaw. A student of the State Higher School of Fine Arts, and from 1950, the Academy of Fine Arts, after the merger of both Universities. In 1954, he obtained a diploma from the Academy of Fine Arts at the Faculty of Graphics (studio of Prof. Tadeusz Kulisiewicz). Member of the Association of Polish Artists and Designers, participant of domestic and foreign exhibitions, including several individual ones. In the years 1956–1958, a member of the artistic group "Korekta". For over 30 years, he has been a graphic designer for publishing houses (approximately 800 projects completed in print). In the years 1966–1972, he was a graphic designer for the TV magazine "Refleksje". He conducted classes entitled: "Graphics of the contemporary press" with students of the Faculty of Journalism of the University of Warsaw.

In the 1970s, he dealt with the history of the Warsaw Uprising. Author and co-author of numerous books and articles on this subject, as well as several entries in the Encyclopedia of the Warsaw Uprising.

He appeared in several documentaries related to the Warsaw Uprising.

During the German occupation, he started playing football - he was a junior of the AKS Żoliborz team participating in illegal football competitions. In the years 1946–1947, he was a footballer of KS "Spójnia" in Łódź. A supporter of Polonia Warszawa since 1938. Author of publications devoted to underground football games in Warsaw during the occupation.

In 2002, he was promoted to the rank of lieutenant, and in 2018 to the rank of captain of the Polish Army. Member of the World Association of Home Army Soldiers, the Association of Warsaw Insurgents and the Polish Historical Society. He was non-partisan throughout his life. From 2023, he was an Honorary citizen of Warsaw.

He was buried at the Bródno cemetery in Warsaw (plot 22H-4-26).

== Medals ==
- Officer's Cross of the Order of Polonia Restituta (2001, for outstanding contributions to the independence of the Republic of Poland, for social activities for veterans' organizations)
- Knight's Cross of the Order of Polonia Restituta
- Cross of Valor
- Home Army Cross
- Warsaw Uprising Cross
- Partisan Cross
- Army Medal for War
- Medal for Warsaw 1939-1945
- Medal "For popularizing the Warsaw Uprising"
- Badge of Honor "For Merits to Warsaw"
- honorary badges of veteran communities: "Leśnik" group, "Róg" group, "Dzik" and "Pięść" battalions
- Custodian of National Remembrance
