= 322nd Rifle Division =

322nd Rifle Division (August 1941 – July 1945)
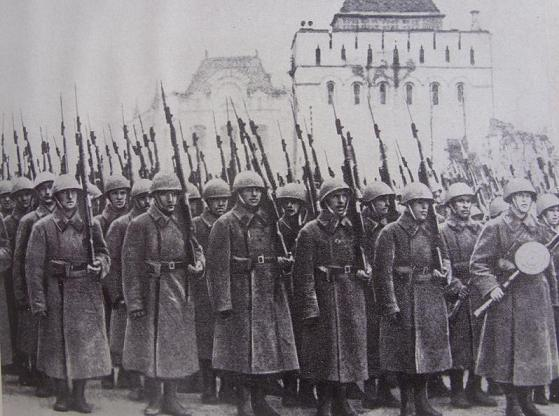
- Soldiers of the 322nd Rifle Division, before going to the front. November of 1941. Soviet Square, Gorky
- Active: 1941–1945
- Country: Soviet Union
- Branch: Red Army
- Type: Infantry
- Size: Division
- Engagements: Battle of Moscow; Battle of Kursk; Lower Dnieper Offensive; Battle of Kiev (1943); Zhitomir–Berdichev Offensive; Lvov-Sandomierz Offensive; Vistula-Oder Operation; Prague Offensive
- Decorations: Order of the Red Banner; Order of Suvorov
- Battle honours: Zhitomir

Commanders
- Notable commanders: Col. Pyotr Isaevich Filimanov; Maj. Gen. Gurii Nikitich Terentev; Col. Nikolai Ivanovoch Ivanov; Maj. Gen. Pyotr Nikolaievich Lashchenko; Maj. Gen. Pyotr Ivanovich Zubov

The 322nd Rifle Division was a standard Red Army rifle division during World War II. It is most notable for liberating Auschwitz concentration camp as part of the 60th Army on January 27, 1945, in the course of the Vistula-Oder offensive. Prior to this the division also distinguished itself during the second liberation of Zhitomir on the last day of 1943. It received further distinctions for its service in western Ukraine and in Poland. Along with many other distinguished Soviet formations it was disbanded with the coming of peace.

== Formation ==
The division was established at Gorki in the Moscow Military District in August, 1941. At its formation, the basic order of battle was as follows:

- 1085th Rifle Regiment
- 1087th Rifle Regiment
- 1089th Rifle Regiment
- 886th Artillery Regiment
- 297th Antitank Battalion
- 603rd Sapper Battalion

Once formed in October, it was noted that the division was 90% Russian, with a cadre of 8% Communist Party members or Komsomols. At this time it was assigned to 10th Reserve Army; it was noted as being short of trained officers, basic equipment, and weapons. The first divisional commander recorded in Commanders of Corps and Divisions in the Great Patriotic War, 1941 - 1945 is Col. Pyotr Isaevich Filimanov, appointed on January 25, 1942 and replaced by Col. Gurii Nikitich Terentev a month later. Terentev would be promoted to Major General on January 27, 1943.

== Combat service ==
When it went to the front, the 322nd was initially assigned to 10th Army, east of Tula, in the Ryazan-Kalino-Shilovo area. The Army commander was ordered to finish concentration by the evening of December 2 and on December 4 (according to the instruction No.0044/OP) to strike the main blow in the Mihailov/Stalinogorsk direction as the Soviet winter counteroffensive began. By December 6 it had reached the line Klemovo - Okunkovo - Rybkino. On December 9, the division was transferred to reinforce the 1st Guards Cavalry Corps and over the coming days assisted in breaking the resistance of elements of 2nd Panzer Army along the line of the Shat River, west and southwest of Stalinogorsk. It took part in the liberation of Sukhinichi on January 29, 1942; immediately following, the 322nd was reassigned to 16th Army in the Western Front, where it remained for the following year along a relatively quiet sector.

In January, 1943, the division was once more reassigned, now to the 60th Army, where it would remain for the duration, apart from a few months later that year. General Terentev was replaced temporarily in command on February 5 by a colonel who was himself replaced three weeks later by Col. Nikolai Ivanovoch Ivanov. Advancing on Voronezh Front's left wing, 60th Army drove 4th Panzer Division out of Kursk on February 8, helping to form a 60 km gap in the German front. On February 16 the Army's headquarters issued the following order (in part):

"...in the center – Studenok, Rylsk (incl.) and Korenovko – a shock group consisting of the 322nd, 121st, and 141st Rifle Divisions, the 129th Rifle Brigade, and the 150th Tank Brigade, with the mission to be ready to attack toward Glukhov or Putivl..."

In March, 60th Army made a bewildering set of reassignments before ending up in Central Front, deep in what became known as the Kursk Salient. The 322nd was assigned at this time to 30th Rifle Corps.

The division fought during the Battle of Kursk, although it saw limited action due to its position in the western sector of the salient. On August 22, Colonel Ivanov made way for Col. Pyotr Nikolaievich Lashchenko, who would be promoted to Major General on June 3, 1944. On August 26, 60th Army joined the main offensive and quickly broke through at Sevsk, exploiting towards the Dniepr River. In September, the 322nd was transferred to 17th Guards Rifle Corps in 13th Army. The division moved back to 60th Army in November. That army was soon assigned to 1st Ukrainian Front.

Following the liberation of Kiev, that Front pushed westward during November, liberating the city of Zhitomir, but then losing it to a German counteroffensive. In December, the Zhitomir–Berdichev Offensive was launched, and Zhitomir was liberated for a second time on December 31. The 322nd was recognized for its contribution to this victory by receiving the city's name as an honorific:

"ZHITOMIR" - 322nd Rifle Division (Colonel Lashchenko, Pyotr Nikolaievich)... the troops who participated in the liberation of Zhitomir, by the order of the Supreme High Command of 1 January 1944, and a commendation in Moscow, are given a salute of 20 artillery salvos from 224 guns.

The division was further honored on February 17 for its role in the liberation of Shepetivka with the Order of the Red Banner. On July 18 the division saw its final change of command with the arrival of Guards Maj. Gen. Pyotr Ivanovich Zubov.

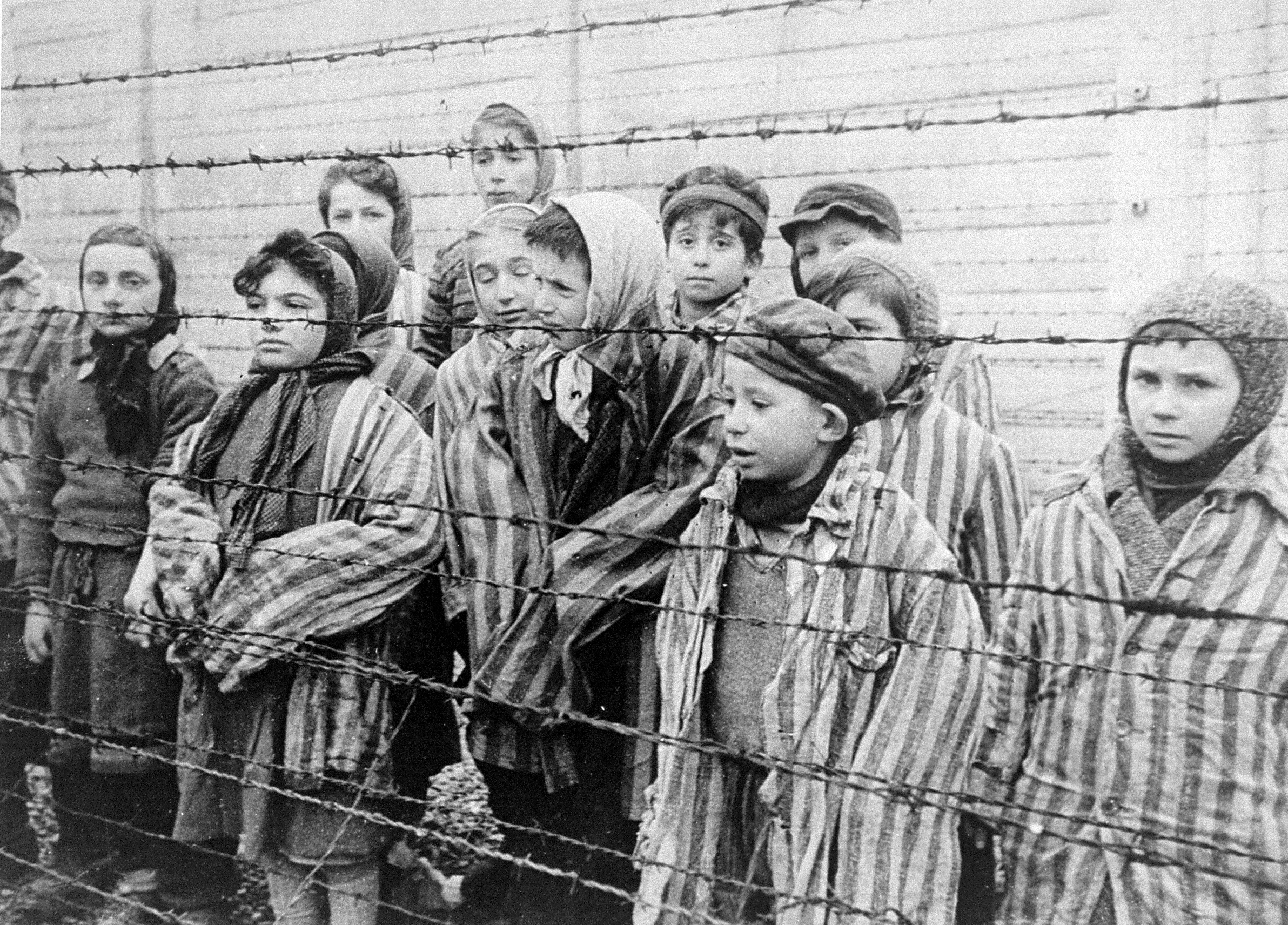
Child survivors of Auschwitz as found by the division.

After the breakout from the Baranow bridgehead during the Vistula-Oder Offensive in January, 1945, 60th Army began a deep exploitation to the west, through southern Poland. In the course of this, the 322nd was the first Soviet unit to reach the Auschwitz concentration camp. The camp was liberated and nearby German rearguards overcome on January 26 and 27. The men and women of the division found 7,500 prisoners and over 600 corpses left behind. On February 19 the 322nd was awarded the Order of Suvorov, 2nd Class, for its role in the liberation of Kraków.

In the last weeks of the war 60th Army was transferred to 4th Ukrainian Front, advancing through Czechoslovakia. At this point, the 322nd was serving in the 3rd Mountain Rifle Corps. By the end of the war the division had earned the full title 322nd Rifle, Zhitomir, Order of the Red Banner, Order of Suvorov Division: (Russian: 322-я стрелковая Житомирская Краснознамённая ордена Суворова дивизия). On June 29, in recognition of his "skillful leadership of the troops and for displaying courage and heroism", General Zubov was awarded the Gold Star of a Hero of the Soviet Union. The division was disbanded "in place" with the Northern Group of Forces in the summer of 1945.
