= Liberation of Auschwitz concentration camp =

Soviet action during World War II

Coordinates: 50°02′09″N 19°10′42″E

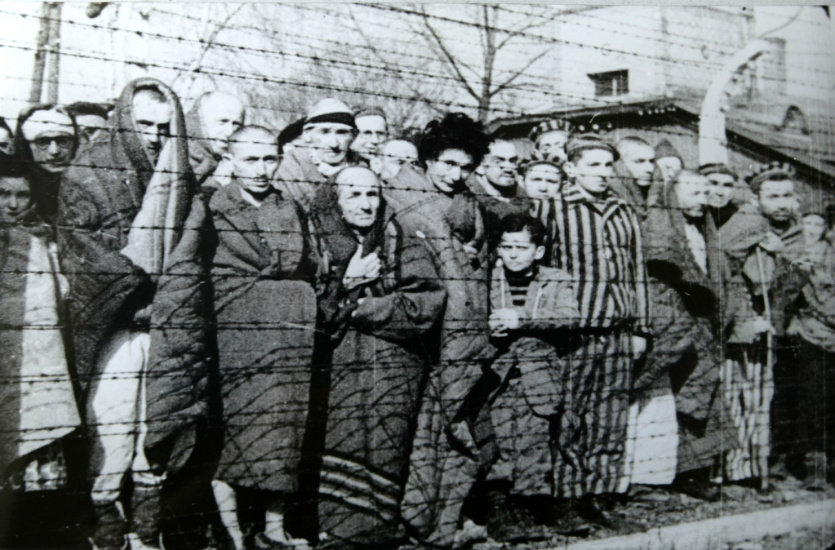
Newly liberated prisoners at Auschwitz in 1945

On 27 January 1945, Auschwitz—a Nazi concentration camp and extermination camp in occupied Poland where more than a million people were murdered as part of the Nazis' "Final Solution" to the Jewish question—was liberated by the Soviet Red Army during the Vistula–Oder Offensive. Although most of the prisoners had been forced onto a death march, about 7,000 had been left behind. The Soviet soldiers attempted to help the survivors and were shocked at the scale of Nazi crimes. The date is recognized as International Holocaust Remembrance Day.

== Background ==
Between 1940 and 1945, about 1.3 million people (mostly Jews) were deported to Auschwitz by Nazi Germany; 1.1 million were murdered. In August 1944, there were more than 135,000 prisoners across the complex. In January 1945, after the Red Army launched the Vistula–Oder Offensive and approached the camp, almost 60,000 prisoners were forced to leave on a death march westward. Inmates were marched mostly to Wodzisław Śląski but also to Gleiwitz (Gliwice), where they were forced into Holocaust trains and transported to concentration camps in Germany. However, the liberation of the camp was not a specific goal of the Red Army and happened as a consequence of their advance westward across Poland. The Red Army had already liberated concentration camps in the Baltic area in early- to mid-1944, and other concentration camps continued to be liberated until the German surrender and the end of World War II in Europe in May 1945.

== Liberation ==
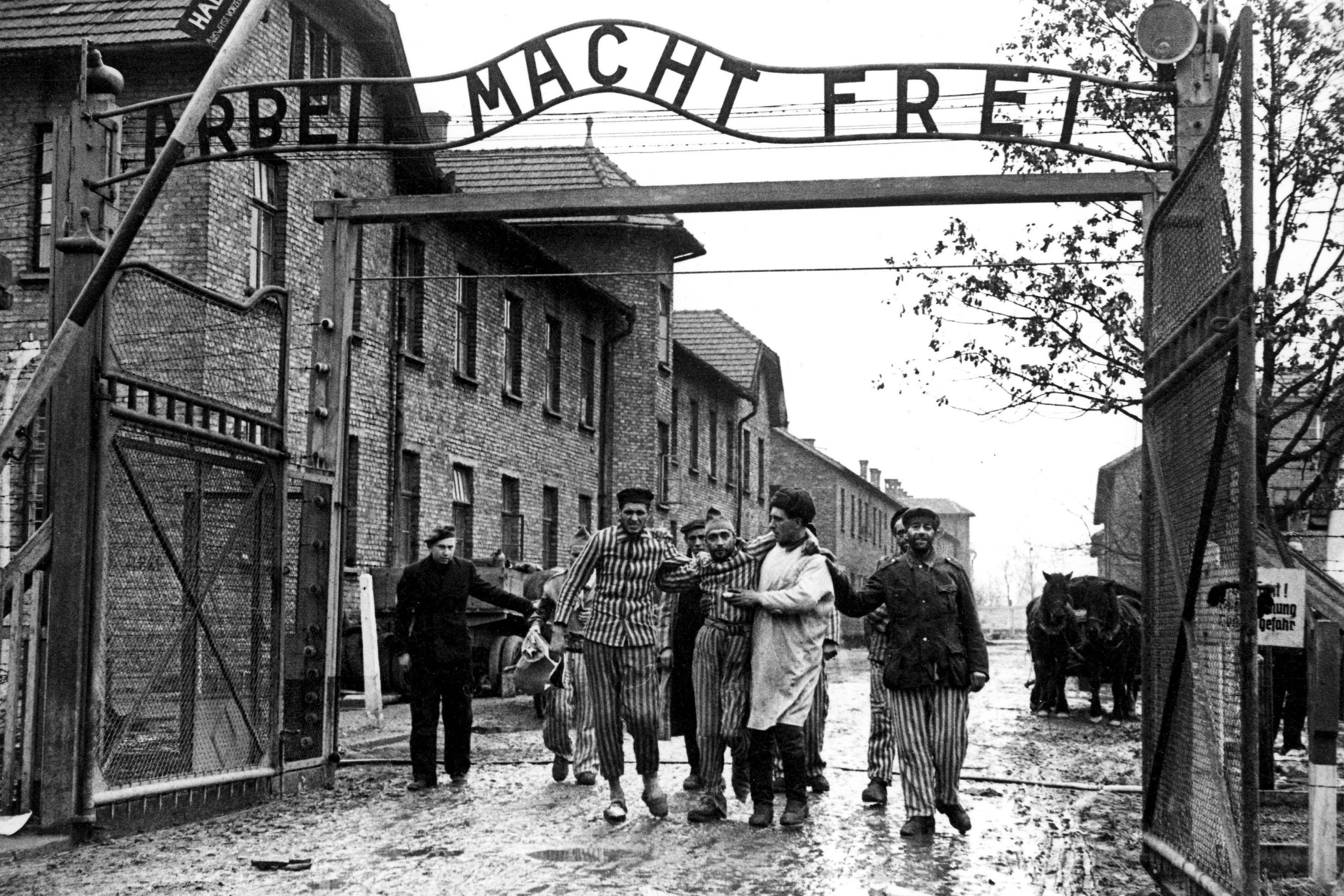
Soviet soldiers liberating Auschwitz concentration camp

Red Army soldiers from the 322nd Rifle Division arrived at Auschwitz on 27 January 1945 at 15:00. A total of 231 Red Army soldiers died in the fighting around Monowitz concentration camp, Birkenau, and Auschwitz I, as well as the town of Oświęcim and village of Brzezinka. For most of the survivors, there was no definite moment of liberation. After the death march away from the camp, the SS-TV guards had left.

About 7,000 prisoners had been left behind, most of whom were seriously ill due to the effects of their imprisonment. The majority of those left behind were middle-aged adults or children younger than 15. Red Army soldiers also found 600 corpses, 370,000 men's suits, 837,000 articles of women's clothing, and seven tonnes (7.7 tons) of human hair. At Monowitz camp, there were about 800 survivors, and the camp was also liberated on 27 January by the Soviet 60th Army, part of the 1st Ukrainian Front.

Battle-hardened Russian soldiers who were used to seeing death in battle were shocked by the Nazis' treatment of prisoners at Auschwitz. Red Army general Vasily Petrenko, commander of the 107th Infantry Division, remarked, "I who saw people dying every day was shocked by the Nazis' indescribable hatred toward the inmates who had turned into living skeletons. I read about the Nazis' treatment of Jews in various leaflets, but there was nothing about the Nazis' treatment of women, children, and old men. It was in Auschwitz that I found out about the fate of the Jews." In a few articles in Soviet newspapers, such as Pravda, following Soviet propaganda, the writers failed to mention Jews in their articles on the liberation.

As soon as they arrived, the liberating forces (assisted by the Polish Red Cross) tried to help survivors by organizing medical care and food; Red Army hospitals cared for 4,500 survivors. There were also efforts to document the camp. As late as June 1945, there were still 300 survivors at the camp who were too weak to be moved.

== Commemoration ==
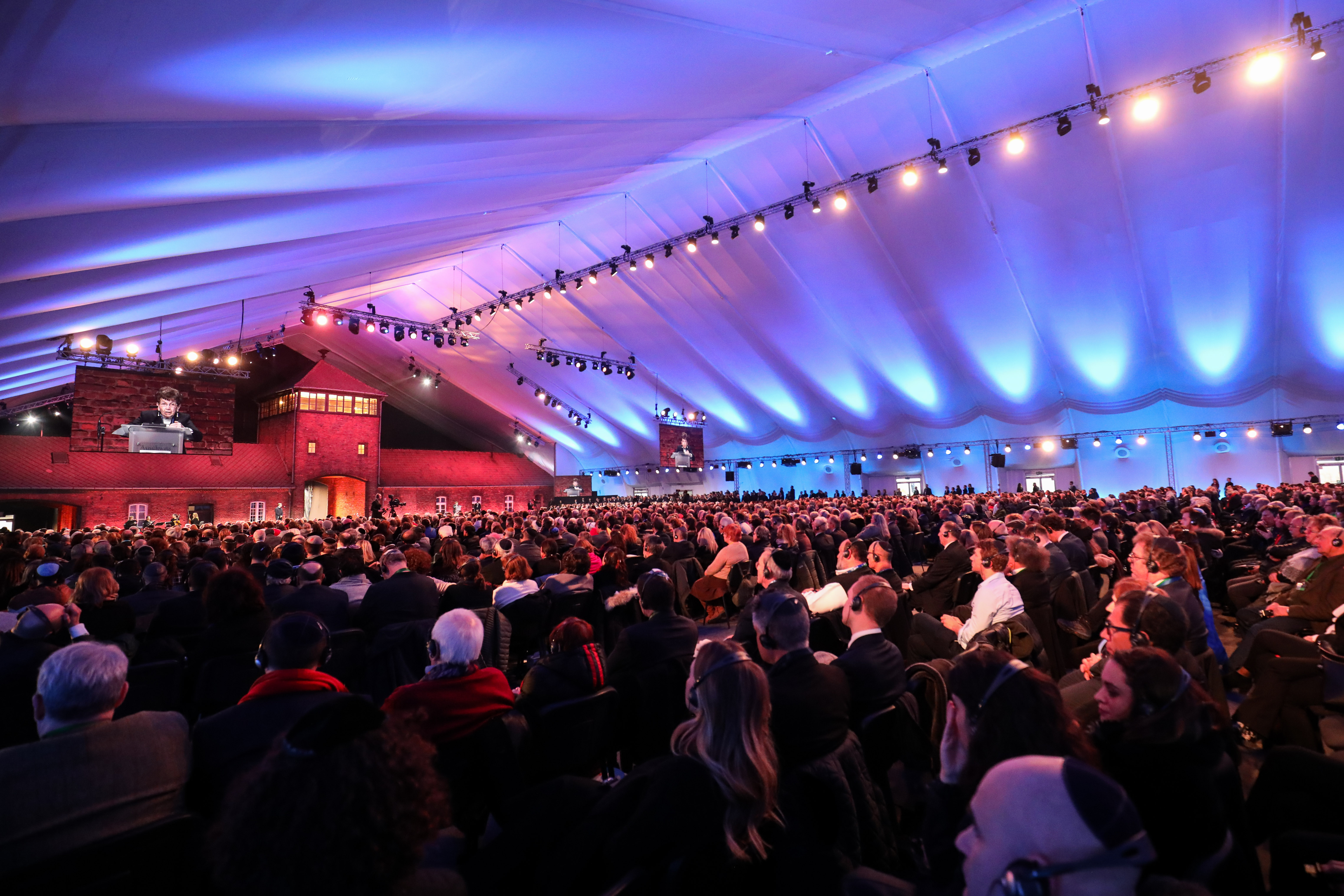
On January 27, 2020, over 200 Auschwitz and Holocaust survivors met in front of the Death Gate at the former Auschwitz II-Birkenau camp to commemorate the 75th anniversary of the liberation.

The anniversary of the date of the liberation is recognized by the United Nations and the European Union as International Holocaust Remembrance Day. On the 75th anniversary, in 2020, a forum of world leaders—the World Holocaust Forum—was hosted in Israel by President Reuven Rivlin. Attendees included United States Speaker of the House Nancy Pelosi, President of Russia Vladimir Putin, Charles, Prince of Wales, President of Germany Frank-Walter Steinmeier, and President of Ukraine Volodymyr Zelenskyy.

In January 2025, Polish Prime Minister Donald Tusk guaranteed safe passage for senior Israeli officials, including Israeli Prime Minister Benjamin Netanyahu, to travel to an event marking the 80th anniversary of the liberation of Auschwitz, despite an arrest warrant issued for Netanyahu by the International Criminal Court. Russian representatives have not been invited to the event since the start of the Russian invasion of Ukraine in 2022.
