= 1918 in the United Kingdom =

Events from the year 1918 in the United Kingdom. This year sees the end of the First World War after four years, which Britain and its allies won (beginning the Interwar period), and a major advance in women's suffrage.

== Incumbents ==
- Monarch – George V
- Prime Minister – David Lloyd George (Coalition)

== Events ==
- 12 January
  - Minnie Pit disaster, a mining accident at Halmer End in the North Staffordshire Coalfield, kills 155 as the result of an explosion caused by firedamp.
  - Admiralty M-class destroyers HMS Narborough (1916) and HMS Opal (1915) run aground and are wrecked off Orkney in a severe storm with only one survivor.
- 15 January – the keel of HMS Hermes (95) is laid on Tyneside, the first purpose-designed aircraft carrier to be laid down.
- 28 January – night of unusually heavy bombing in London and south-east England.
- 31 January – "Battle of May Island": in a confused series of collisions as a large Royal Navy fleet steams down the Firth of Forth this evening, submarines HMS K4 and HMS K17 are sunk, three other submarines and a light cruiser are damaged and 104 men are killed.
- 6 February – Representation of the People Act gives women the vote provided they are over 30 and are (or are married to) a local government elector. It also removes most property qualifications, giving all adult (over-21) male resident householders the vote, and requires elections to be restricted to a single day. Many conscientious objectors are barred from voting until 5 years after the end of the war.
- 1 March – armed merchant cruiser HMS Calgarian (1913) is torpedoed and sunk off Rathlin Island, Ireland, by Imperial German Navy U-boat SM U-19 with the loss of 49 lives.
- 23 March – in London at the Wood Green Empire, Chung Ling Soo (William E Robinson, US-born magician) dies during his trick where he was supposed to "catch" two separate bullets – one of them perforates his lung. He dies the following morning in hospital.

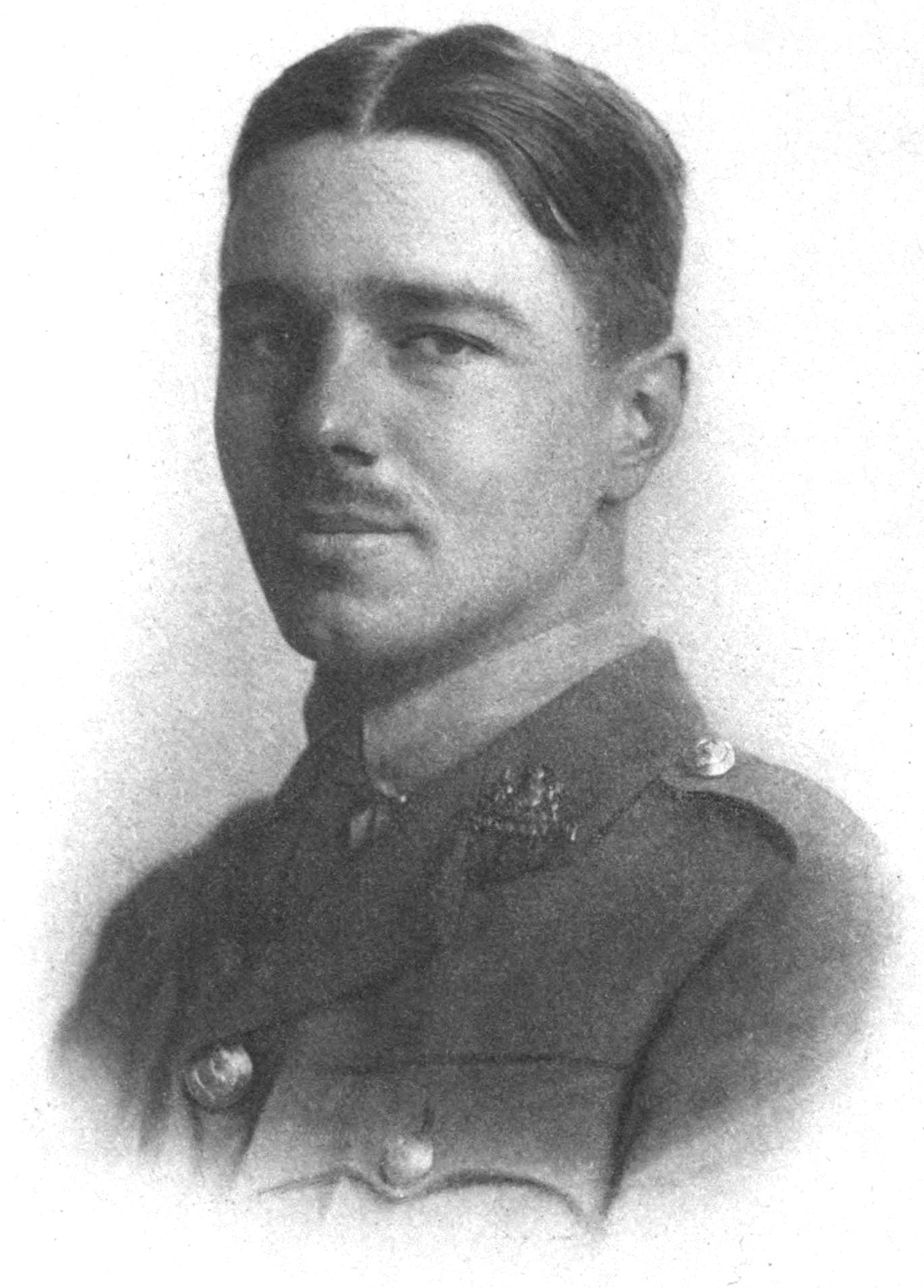
2nd Lt Wilfred Owen, killed a week before the Armistice

- 1 April – the Royal Flying Corps and the Royal Naval Air Service are merged to form the Royal Air Force; the Royal Air Force; the Women's Royal Air Force is also founded to provide mechanics.
- 23 April
  - Conscription Crisis of 1918 in Ireland: a general strike is held here against conscription.
  - Zeebrugge Raid, an attempt by the Royal Navy to seal off the German U-boat base here.
- 9 May – Maurice Debate in the House of Commons.
- June – standard clothing introduced.
- 3 June – GPO raises postage rates: the ordinary letter rate is now 1½d., bringing an end to the Uniform Penny Post which has existed since 1840; and the rate for postcards doubles from ½d. to 1d.
- 1 July – explosion of 8 tons of TNT at the National Shell Filling Factory, Chilwell (Nottinghamshire) kills 134; only 32 bodies can be positively identified.
- 15 July – ration books introduced for butter, margarine, lard, meat and sugar.
- 17 July – RMS Carpathia is torpedoed and sunk off the east coast of Ireland by Imperial German Navy U-boat SM U-55; 218 of the 223 on board are rescued.
- 20 July – troopship SS Justicia is torpedoed and sunk off the north coast of Ireland by SM UB-124 while under tow after surviving torpedo damage the previous day; she is unladen and most of the crew are evacuated.
- 1 August – British anti-Bolshevik forces occupy Arkhangelsk, Russia. On 10 August their commander is told to help White Russians.
- 8 August – Education Act (drafted by H. A. L. Fisher) raises the school leaving age in England and Wales to fourteen (with children obliged to attend school full-time) and remits all fees in elementary schools.
- 30 August – strike of 20,000 London policemen with demands of increased pay and union recognition.
- 11 September – Gainsborough wins the English Triple Crown by finishing first in the Derby, 2,000 Guineas and (substitute) St Leger.
- 16 September – HMS Glatton, never having gone into action, is scuttled in Dover Harbour to prevent an accidental fire causing a serious explosion; 79 are killed.
- 26 September – United States Coast Guard cutter Tampa is torpedoed and sunk in the Bristol Channel by German submarine SM UB-91 with the loss of all 131 on board, the greatest loss of life for any US combat vessel in the war.
- 29 September – first performance of Gustav Holst's orchestral suite The Planets, before an invited audience at the Queen's Hall in London, conducted by Adrian Boult.
- 6 October – troopship HMS Otranto is wrecked after a collision off Islay with 351 United States troops and 80 crew lost.
- 26 October – Cecil Chubb donates Stonehenge to the nation.
- 27 October–2 November – 2,200 deaths in London over this period due to "Spanish flu". Barnsley is the town with the highest mortality rate from the pandemic.
- 3 November – armistice with Austria-Hungary signed in Padua.
- 5 November – former Cunarder HMS Campania sinks in an accident in the Firth of Forth with no loss of life.
- 9 November – battleship HMS Britannia is sunk by a German submarine off Trafalgar with the loss of around fifty lives, the last major naval engagement of World War I.
- 11 November – World War I ends: Germany signs an armistice agreement with the Allies in the "Compiègne Wagon" in France with Admiral Sir Rosslyn Wemyss as British representative. George Edwin Ellison becomes the last British soldier to be killed in the War, near Mons in Belgium.
- 14 November – Labour Party leaves the wartime coalition government.
- 15 November – first released British prisoners of war reach Calais.
- 20 November – U-boats start to rendezvous off Harwich to begin the surrender of the High Seas Fleet to the Royal Navy; in the following week the German warships are escorted to internment in Scapa Flow.
- 21 November – the Parliament (Qualification of Women) Act 1918 receives Royal Assent, giving women over 21 the right to stand as a Member of Parliament.
- 23 November – British military government of Palestine begins.
- 5 December – light cruiser HMS Cassandra sunk by mine in the Gulf of Finland while assisting Estonia against the Bolsheviks, with eleven crew lost.
- 14 December – general election polling held. It is the first national election in the United Kingdom at which women are entitled to vote or stand, and the male franchise is extended. This is known as the "Coupon election" from the letter of endorsement given to candidates of the official (and victorious) Coalition by Bonar Law and Lloyd George.
- 24 December – first Festival of Nine Lessons and Carols at King's College, Cambridge, held.
- 28 December – Constance Markievicz, while detained in Holloway Prison, becomes the first woman MP elected to (but not to take her seat in) the House of Commons of the United Kingdom. Sinn Féin, her party, has won 73 out of 105 Irish seats in the British Parliament but, in accordance with their manifesto, its members refuse to take their seats in the Palace of Westminster and instead form Dáil Éireann in Ireland in 1919.
- 29 December – the Sunday Express newspaper published for the first time.

=== Undated ===
- United Newspapers Ltd. founded in London.
- The Scottish county of Elginshire is officially renamed as the County of Moray (Morayshire).

== Publications ==
- Ethel M. Dell's romance novel Greatheart.
- Gerard Manley Hopkins' Poems of Gerard Manley Hopkins (posthumous).
- Daniel Jones's textbook An Outline of English Phonetics (containing the first comprehensive description of British Received Pronunciation).
- Wyndham Lewis's novel Tarr (in book form).
- André Maurois' novel Les Silences du Colonel Bramble.
- Siegfried Sassoon's Counter-Attack and Other Poems.
- Dr Marie Stopes' books Married Love and Wise Parenthood.
- Lytton Strachey's historical biography Eminent Victorians.
- Rebecca West's novel The Return of the Soldier.

== Births ==
- 1 January
  - Patrick Anthony Porteous, Scottish soldier, recipient of the Victoria Cross (born in the British Raj; died 2000)
  - Albert McQuarrie, Scottish politician (died 2016)
- 2 January – Basil Hall, civil servant (died 2011)
- 15 January
  - Diana Barnato Walker, aviator (died 2008)
  - David George Kendall, mathematician (died 2007)
  - Deryck Stapleton, Royal Air Force officer (died 2018)
- 16 January – Robin Dunn, Army officer and judge (died 2014)
- 19 January – Terence Miller, academic and palaeontologist (died 2015)
- 24 February – Michael Hanley, intelligence officer (died 2001)
- 26 January – Archie Scott, Scottish cricketer (died 2019)
- 28 January
  - Harry Corbett, English puppeteer, actor and screenwriter (died 1989)
  - Trevor Skeet, lawyer and politician (born in New Zealand; died 2004)
  - Michael Wood, surgeon (died 1987)
- 1 February – Muriel Spark, Scottish author (died 2006 in Italy)
- 2 February – Stuart Blanch, Anglican prelate and Archbishop of York (died 1994)
- 4 February – Clive Bossom, politician (died 2017)
- 8 February – Max Rayne, property developer (died 2003)
- 9 February – Morris Barry, television producer (died 2000)
- 10 February – Idwal Pugh, Welsh civil servant (died 2010)
- 11 February – Maurice Mounsdon, RAF pilot (died 2019)
- 18 February – Lilian Bader, aircraftwoman and teacher (died 2015)
- 19 February – Nigel Forbes, 22nd Lord Forbes, nobleman, soldier, businessman and politician (died 2013)
- 25 February – Frederic Mullally, journalist and novelist (died 2014)
- 28 February – Alfred Burke, actor (died 2011)
- 1 March
  - Roger Delgado, actor (died 1973)
  - Lewis Hodges, air marshal and pilot (died 2007)
- 2 March
  - Lady Moyra Browne, nursing administrator and noblewoman (died 2016)
  - Martin Flannery, politician (died 2006)
- 7 March – Joan Stafford-King-Harman, socialite and intelligence officer (died 2018)
- 13 March
  - Marjorie Blamey, illustrator (died 2019)
  - Jack Butterworth, lawyer (died 2003)
  - John Gray, physiologist (died 2011)
- 15 March
  - Michael Barratt Brown, economist and political activist (died 2015)
  - George Haig, 2nd Earl Haig, soldier, artist and peer (died 2009)
  - Mary Malcolm, television journalist (died 2010)
- 18 March – Terry Spencer, World War II RAF fighter pilot and war photographer (died 2009)
- 20 March – Donald Featherstone, author and wargamer (died 2013)
- 26 March – William Hardcastle, broadcaster and journalist (died 1975)
- 31 March – Sheila Sherlock, physician (died 2001)
- 2 April – Geoffrey Dhenin, Welsh air marshal and physician (died 2011)
- 6 April – Hugh Verity, fighter pilot (died 2001)
- 9 April – Frank Brenchley, diplomat (died 2011)
- 10 April – Betty Tebbs, campaigner for women's rights and peace (died 2017)
- 11 April – Richard Wainwright, politician (died 2003)
- 13 April – A. L. Barker, writer (died 2002)
- 16 April
  - Syd Cain, film production designer (died 2011)
  - Dick Gibson, racing driver (died 2010)
  - Spike Milligan, comedian, writer, musician, poet and playwright (born in the British Raj; died 2002)
- 18 April
  - Avril Angers, actress (died 2005)
  - Neville Bosworth, politician (died 2012)
- 23 April – James Kirkup, poet, translator and travel writer (died 2009)
- 29 April – Fraser Noble, Scottish academic (died 2003)
- 1 May – James Copeland, actor (died 2002)
- 2 May – John Barraclough, air marshal (died 2008)
- 3 May – Ted Bates, footballer and manager (died 2003)
- 5 May
  - Margaret Harrison, Scottish peace campaigner (died 2015)
  - Theodore Schurch, soldier (died 1946)
- 9 May
  - Hugh Jackson, paediatrician and child safety campaigner (died 2013)
  - Kyffin Williams, Welsh landscape painter (died 2006)
- 10 May – John Martin, Royal Navy officer (died 2011)
- 13 May – Frank Anscombe, statistician (died 2001)
- 15 May
  - James Baddiley, biochemist (died 2008)
  - Arthur Rook, dermatologist (died 1991)
- 16 May – Wilf Mannion, footballer (died 2000)
- 17 May – Anthony Bishop, prelate (died 1988)
- 20 May
  - Jeremy Hawk, actor (died 2002)
  - David Ormsby-Gore, 5th Baron Harlech, diplomat and politician (died 1985)
- 21 May – Ralph Russell, scholar (died 2008)
- 23 May – Denis Compton, cricketer and footballer (died 1997)
- 24 May – Jack Edwards, World War II soldier (died 2006)
- 26 May – Thomas Johnstone McWiggan, aviation engineer (died 2016)
- 29 May
  - David Rees, mathematician (died 2013)
  - Richard Walker, angler (died 1985)
- 31 May – Sadie Corré, actress and tap dancer (died 2009)
- 1 June – Katherine Grant, 12th Countess of Dysart, Scottish noblewoman (died 2011)
- 6 June
  - Kenneth Connor, actor (died 1993)
  - Susan Williams-Ellis, pottery designer (died 2007)
- 11 June – Lady Edith Foxwell, eccentric (died 1996)
- 12 June – Harold Walker, cricketer (died 2000)
- 14 June – Edna Healey, writer, lecturer and filmmaker (died 2010)
- 16 June – Geoffrey Beck, cricketer (died 2019)
- 17 June – Derek Barber, Baron Barber of Tewkesbury, life peer and politician (died 2017)
- 20 June
  - Archie Boyd, Royal Air Force officer (died 2014)
  - Paul Jennings, writer and comedian (died 1989)
- 22 June – Cicely Saunders, nurse, physician and writer (died 2005)
- 23 June – Paul Ashbee, archaeologist (died 2009)
- 25 June
  - P. H. Newby, novelist (died 1997)
  - Lady Cynthia Postan, debutante, secretary for M15, translator and horticulturalist (died 2017
- 27 June – Douglas John Foskett, librarian (died 2004)
- 28 June – William Whitelaw, 1st Viscount Whitelaw, nobleman and politician (died 1999)
- 4 July
  - Alec Bedser, cricketer (died 2010)
  - Tony Garrett, executive (died 2017)
  - Michael Stoker, physician (died 2013)
  - Edward Craven Walker, inventor (died 2000)
- 5 July – Michael Hamilton, politician (died 2000)
- 8 July
  - Julia Pirie, spy (died 2008)
  - Roy Shaw, educationalist (died 2012)
- 9 July – John Heath-Stubbs, poet and translator (died 2006)
- 10 July – James Aldridge, Australian-born writer and journalist (died 2015)
- 11 July – Venetia Burney, teacher who named the planet Pluto (died 2009)
- 12 July – Mary Glen-Haig, Olympic fencer (died 2014)
- 13 July – Larry Taylor, actor (died 2003)
- 14 July – Geoffrey Hebden, cricketer (died 2000)
- 15 July
  - Aubrey Buxton, Baron Buxton of Alsa, soldier, politician, television executive and writer (died 2009)
  - Stan Cox, Olympic athlete (died 2012)
  - Arthur Dimmock, author and historian (died 2007)
- 16 July
  - Denis Edward Arnold, soldier (died 2015)
  - Paul Farnes, RAF pilot and World War II veteran (died 2020)
  - John Everitt Frost DFC & Bar, World War II SAAF fighter pilot (MIA 16 June 1942)
  - Samuel Victor Perry, biochemist (died 2009)
- 17 July
  - Ann Parker Bowles, aristocrat and Girl Guides leader (died 1987)
  - Albert Johnson, rugby player (died 1998)
  - Geoffrey Lane, judge (died 2005)
  - Edgar O'Ballance, military journalist (died 2009)
- 20 July – Eric Longworth, actor (died 2008)
- 21 July
  - David Piper, curator and novelist (died 1990)
  - Tommy Sale, rugby league player (died 2016)
- 25 July – Alexander McKee, journalist, military historian and diver, discoverer of the Mary Rose (died 1992)
- 27 July – Roy Romain, Olympic swimmer (died 2010)
- 28 July – Rowland Baring, 3rd Earl of Cromer, banker and diplomat (died 1991)
- 30 July – Philip Crosland, journalist (died 2012)
- 1 August – Richard Pearson, actor (died 2011)
- 2 August – Diana King, actress (died 1986)
- 4 August – Brian Crozier, author and journalist (died 2012)
- 8 August
  - Brian Stonehouse, painter and World War II spy (died 1998)
  - Miles Vaughan Williams, pharmacologist (died 2016)
- 10 August
  - Jack Archer, sprinter (died 1997)
  - Martin Benson, actor (died 2010)
- 11 August – Thomas A. Bird, soldier and architect (died 2017)
- 13 August – Frederick Sanger, biochemist, double Nobel Prize laureate (died 2013)
- 15 August – Derrick Bailey, cricketer (died 2009)
- 17 August – Michael John Wise, academic and geographer (died 2015)
- 19 August
  - Patrick Dowling, television producer (died 2009)
  - Dilys Elwyn-Edwards, Welsh composer and lecturer (died 2012)
- 20 August – Hanna Segal, Polish-born psychoanalyst (died 2011)
- 23 August – Nancy Thomas, television producer (died 2015)
- 26 August – Geoffrey John Kirkby, Royal Navy officer (died 1998)
- 27 August – Norman Mitchell, actor (died 2001)
- 29 August
  - Jakie Astor, politician and sportsman (died 2000)
  - Anthony Crosland, politician and author (died 1977)
  - John Herivel, codebreaker (died 2011)
  - Mrs Mills (Gladys Mills, née Jordan), pianist (died 1978)
  - Brian Stonehouse, painter and World War II secret agent (died 1998)
- 30 August – Harold Atcherley, businessman and arts administrator (died 2017)
- 31 August – Bernarr Notley, cricketer (died 2019)
- 1 September – Phyllis Wallbank, educationalist (died 2020)
- 2 September – Frances Campbell-Preston, courtier (died 2022)
- 8 September – Derek Barton, organic chemist, Nobel Prize laureate (died 1998)
- 9 September – John Arundel Barnes, social anthropologist (died 2010)
- 11 September – Brian Campbell Vickery, information scientist (died 2009)
- 16 September
  - Allenby Chilton, footballer (died 1996)
  - Carole Lynne, actress (died 2008)
  - Mervyn Pike, politician (died 2004)
- 17 September
  - Roland Collins, painter (died 2015)
  - Chaim Herzog, sixth president of the State of Israel (born in Belfast; died 1997)
- 20 September – Alec Woodall, politician (died 2011)
- 22 September – Ken Southworth, animator (died 2007)
- 24 September – Richard Hoggart, academic and author (died 2014)
- 26 September
  - Alan Glyn, politician (died 1998)
  - Eric Morley, television host (died 2000)
  - John Rankine, science fiction author (died 2013)
- 27 September
  - Martin Ryle, radio astronomer, recipient of the Nobel Prize in Physics (died 1984)
  - Malcolm Shepherd, 2nd Baron Shepherd, politician (died 2001)
- 28 September – Ida Schuster, Scottish actress (died 2020)
- 30 September
  - Leslie Fox, mathematician (died 1992)
  - Benjamin Milstein, surgeon (died 2013)
- 7 October – Jack Rowley, footballer (died 1998)
- 10 October – Jack Bridger Chalker, artist and teacher (died 2014)
- 13 October – Phyllis Deane, economic historian (died 2012)
- 16 October
  - F. S. Northedge, political scientist (died 1985)
  - Tony Rolt, racing driver and soldier (died 2008)
- 22 October – Jimmy Hanley, actor (died 1970)
- 24 October
  - Helmut Koenigsberger, German-born historian and academic (died 2014)
  - Jim Peters, long-distance runner (died 1999)
- 25 October
  - Gabriel Epstein, German-born architect (died 2017)
  - Donald Wiseman, assyriologist (died 2010)
- 5 November – Alan Tilvern, actor and voice artist (died 2003)
- 10 November – Madron Seligman, politician (died 2002)
- 11 November – Margaret Tait, Scottish actress (died 1999)
- 12 November – Bunny Lewis, record producer and manager (died 2001)
- 18 November – Tasker Watkins, major-general, jurist and businessman (died 2007)
- 22 November – Philippa Scott, conservationist (died 2010)
- 26 November – Harry Hinsley, historian and cryptanalyst (died 1998)
- 27 November – Peter Tuddenham, voice actor (died 2007)
- 1 December – Pete Tunstall, RAF squadron leader (died 2013)
- 2 December – Frederic Bennett, lawyer, journalist and politician (died 2002)
- 3 December – David Severn, writer (died 2010)
- 8 December – Berkeley Smith, broadcaster (died 2003)
- 10 December – Fergus Anckorn, magician (died 2018)
- 18 December – Joyce Reynolds, classicist (died 2022)
- 19 December
  - John Adams, naval officer (died 2008)
  - Georgina Cookson, actress (died 2011)
- 21 December
  - Frank Hampson, illustrator (died 1985)
  - Rosemary Verey, garden designer (died 2001)
- 25 December
  - Angelica Garnett, writer and painter (died 2012)
  - Bertie Mee, football player and manager (died 2001)
- 26 December – Lady Elizabeth Clyde, socialite (died 2013)
- 30 December – David Muirhead, diplomat (died 1999)
- 31 December – Fred Secombe, priest and writer (died 2016)

== Deaths ==
- 15 January – Mark Sheridan, music-hall performer (suicide) (born 1864)
- 22 January – Sir John Wolfe Barry, architect and civil engineer, builder of Tower Bridge (born 1836)
- 5 February – Leonard Monteagle Barlow, fighter pilot (accident) (born 1898)
- 14 February – Sir Cecil Spring Rice, diplomat (born 1859)
- 23 February – Thomas Brassey, 1st Earl Brassey, politician and colonial administrator (born 1836)
- 24 February – Sir Eric Barrington, civil servant (born 1847)
- 23 March – T. P. Cameron Wilson, poet and novelist (born 1888)
- 25 March – Walter Tull, footballer and first Black infantry officer to serve in the British Army (killed in action) (born 1888)
- 1 April – Isaac Rosenberg, painter and poet (killed in action) (born 1890)
- 9 July – James McCudden, fighter pilot (air crash) (born 1895)
- 26 July
  - Henry Macintosh, Scottish Olympic sprinter (killed in action) (born 1892)
  - Mick Mannock, fighter pilot (killed in action) (born 1887)
- 29 July – Charles Gordon Bell, pilot (born 1889)
- 31 July – George McElroy, fighter pilot (killed in action) (born 1893)
- 12 September – Sir George Reid, Scottish-born Member of Parliament (UK), previously Prime Minister of Australia (born 1845)
- 1 October – Evelyn Boscawen, 7th Viscount Falmouth, artistocrat and army officer (born 1847)
- 5 October – Robbie Ross, writer (born 1869)
- 7 October – Sir Hubert Parry, composer (born 1848)
- 24 October – Daniel Burley Woolfall, football administrator, 2nd President of FIFA (born 1852)
- 4 November – Wilfred Owen, poet (killed in action) (born 1893)
- 5 or 20 November – Samuel Liddell MacGregor Mathers, occultist (born 1854)
- 9 November –
  - Victor Conyngham, 5th Marquess Conyngham, politician (born 1883)
  - Sir Peter Lumsden, Scottish Indian Army general (born 1829)
- 15 November – Sir Robert Anderson, police official (born 1841)
- 24 November – Annie Hall Cudlip, novelist, journalist and editor (born 1838)
- 29 November – Thomas Allinson, physician and dietetic reformer (born 1858)
- 27 December – Birt Acres, American-born pioneer of cinematography (born 1854)

== See also ==
- List of British films before 1920
