= Farnes =

Farnes is a surname. Notable people with the surname include:

- Eleanor Farnes, British writer
- Ken Farnes (1911–1941), English cricketer
- Paul Farnes (1918–2020), British World War II flying ace
- Richard Farnes (born 1964), British conductor

== See also ==
- Farnes Church, a church in Sogn og Fjordane, Norway
