= Otaslavice =

- Municipality
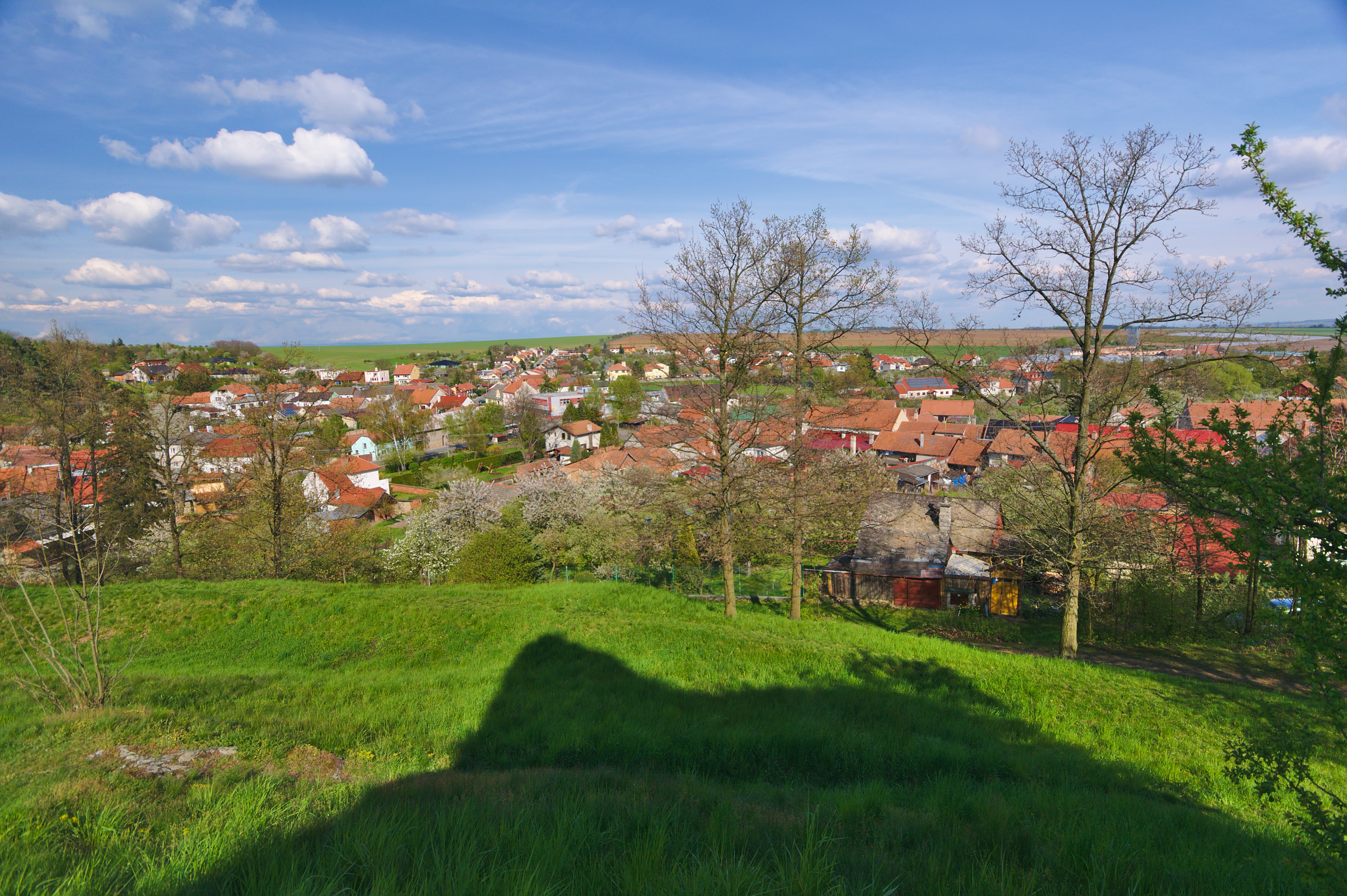
- General view of Otaslavice

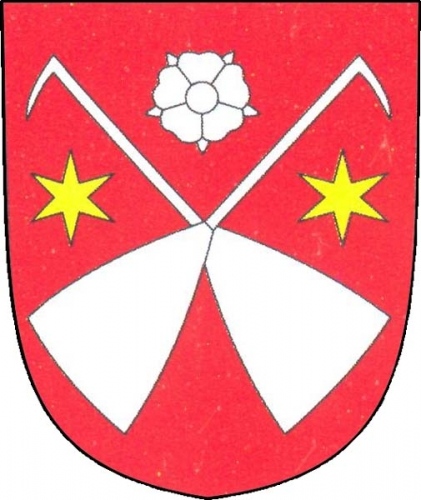
- Flag Coat of arms

- Location in the Czech Republic
- Coordinates: 49°23′18″N 17°4′16″E
- Country: Czech Republic
- Region: Olomouc
- District: Prostějov
- First mentioned: 1279

Area
  - Total: 13.83 km^{2} (5.34 sq mi)
- Elevation: 250 m (820 ft)

Population (2026-01-01)
  - Total: 1,313
  - Density: 94.94/km^{2} (245.9/sq mi)
- Time zone: UTC+1 (CET)
  - Summer (DST): UTC+2 (CEST)
- Postal code: 798 06
- Website: www.otaslavice.cz

Otaslavice is a municipality and village in Prostějov District in the Olomouc Region of the Czech Republic. It has about 1,300 inhabitants.

Otaslavice is about 10 kilometres (6 mi) south of Prostějov, 27 km (17 mi) south-west of Olomouc, and 207 km (129 mi) east of Prague.

== Demographics ==
Historical population
Year	Pop.	±%
1869	1,293	—
1880	1,437	+11.1%
1890	1,436	−0.1%
1900	1,633	+13.7%
1910	1,747	+7.0%
1921	1,720	−1.5%
1930	1,747	+1.6%
1950	1,693	−3.1%
1961	1,715	+1.3%
1970	1,586	−7.5%
1980	1,450	−8.6%
1991	1,264	−12.8%
2001	1,260	−0.3%
2011	1,286	+2.1%
2021	1,285	−0.1%
Source: Censuses

== Sights ==
The main landmarks of Otaslavice are the Church of Saint Michael and the ruins of Otaslavice Castle.

== Notable people ==
- Josef František (1914–1940), fighter pilot
