= Bill Dines =

English cricketer

Personal information
- Full name: William James Dines
- Born: 14 September 1916; Colchester, Essex, England
- Died: 14 June 1992 (aged 75); Gidea Park, Essex, England
- Nickname: Bill
- Batting: Right-handed
- Bowling: Right-arm medium Right-arm off break
- Relatives: Wife, Doreen Ellen (died 21 January 1994) Daughter, Julie, 1956 -

Domestic team information
- Years: Team
- 1947–1949: Essex

Career statistics
Competition	First-class
Matches	20
Runs scored	431
Batting average	18.73
100s/50s	–/2
Top score	69*
Balls bowled	1,952
Wickets	15
Bowling average	65.33
5 wickets in innings	–
10 wickets in match	–
Best bowling	3/35
Catches/stumpings	7/–
- Source: Cricinfo, 9 October 2011

William James Dines (14 September 1916 – 14 June 1992) was an English cricketer. Dines was a right-handed batsman who bowled both right-arm off break and right-arm medium pace, though his medium pace bowler was his primary bowling style. He was born at Colchester, Essex.

Dines made his first-class debut for Essex against Surrey in 1947. He made nineteen further first-class appearances, the last of which came against Cambridge University in 1949. In his twenty first-class appearances for Essex, he scored 431 runs at an average of 18.73, with a high score of 69 not out. This score, which was one of two fifties he made, came against Sussex in 1947. After tasting instant success in his first County Championship match against Northamptonshire in 1947, in which he took the wickets of Harold Walker and Bill Barron in his second over of the match, Dines later found wickets harder to come by. In total he took 15, which came at a bowling average of 65.33, with best figures of 3/35.

He died at Gidea Park, Essex on 14 June 1992.
