= John Hemingway (RAF officer) =

Irish RAF fighter pilot (1919–2025)

Group Captain John Hemingway DFC AE
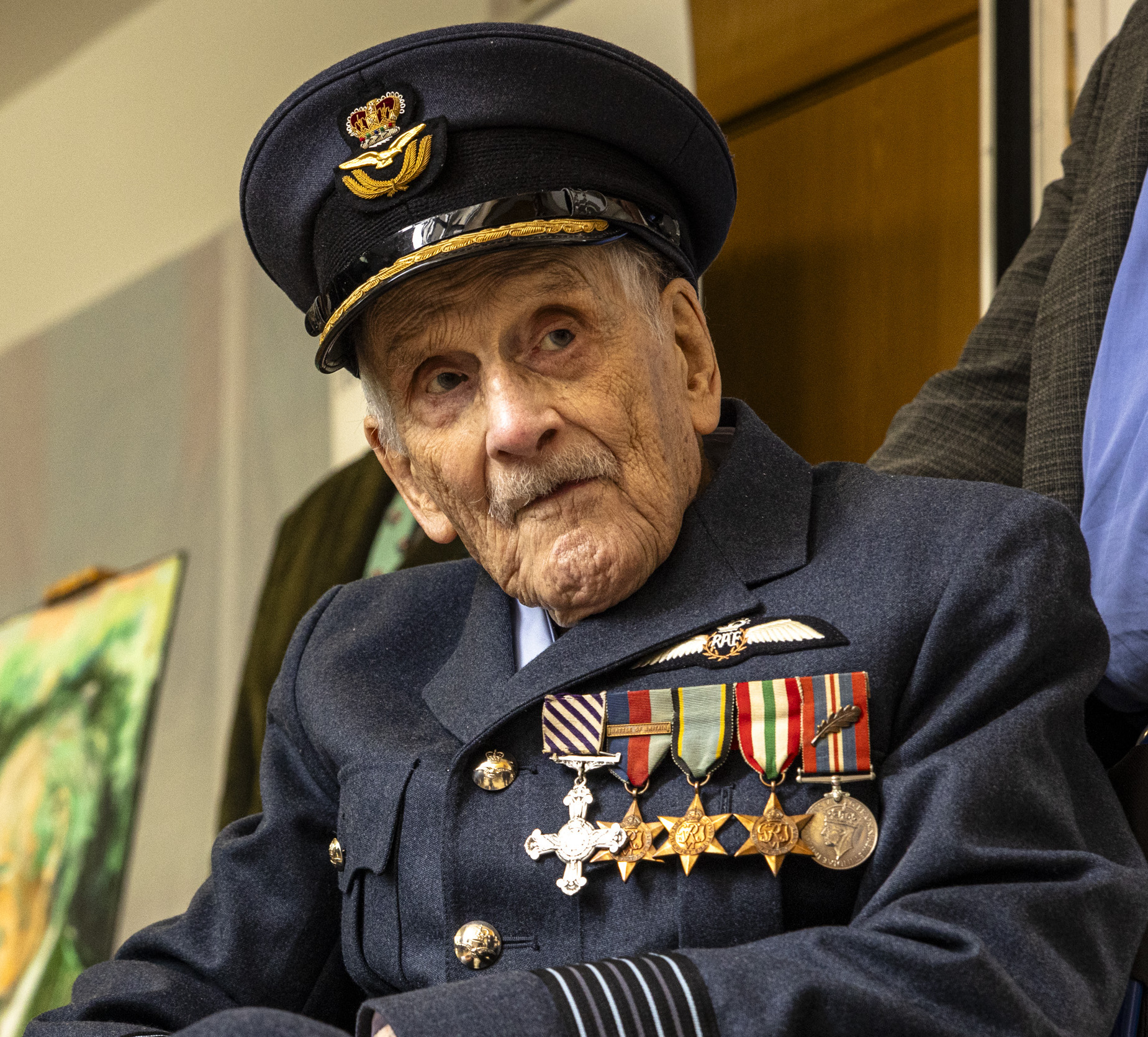
- Hemingway on his 105th birthday
- Born: John Allman Hemingway; 17 July 1919; Dublin, Ireland
- Died: 17 March 2025 (aged 105); Dublin, Ireland
- Military career
- Allegiance: United Kingdom
- Branch: Royal Air Force
- Service years: 1938–1969
- Rank: Group Captain
- Service number: 40702
- Unit: No. 85 Squadron RAF
- Commands: RAF Leconfield; No. 43 Squadron RAF
- Conflicts: Second World War; Battle of Dunkirk; Battle of Britain; Allied invasion of Italy; Invasion of Normandy
- Awards: Distinguished Flying Cross; Mentioned in Despatches; Air Efficiency Award

Group Captain John Allman Hemingway, DFC, AE (17 July 1919 – 17 March 2025), known as Paddy Hemingway, was an Irish fighter pilot who served in the Royal Air Force during the Second World War in the Battle of Dunkirk, the Battle of Britain, the Allied invasion of Italy and the Invasion of Normandy. He was shot down four times during the war. Hemingway was the last surviving airman of the Battle of Britain.

== Early life ==
Hemingway was born in Dublin on 17 July 1919. His family were members of the Church of Ireland, a church in the Anglican Communion. He attended St. Patrick's Cathedral Choir School and St Andrew's College, Dublin.

== RAF career ==
Hemingway was accepted to serve in the Royal Air Force and was granted a short-service commission on 7 March 1938. In January 1939, Hemingway began training in Brough, East Riding of Yorkshire, in England. On 7 March 1939, he was appointed in service as a pilot officer. By early 1940, following the outbreak of the Second World War, he was flying Hurricanes with No. 85 Squadron RAF in France, destroying a Heinkel He 111 on 10 May. The following day, Hemingway destroyed a Do 17 and was forced to make a landing near Maastricht after his plane was damaged. By 15 May, the British Army had brought him to Lille-Seclin and he returned to England two days later. During the Battle of Dunkirk he flew supporting missions over the English Channel.

Hemingway initially served in England with No. 253 Squadron RAF before returning to No. 85 Squadron on 15 June 1940. Hemingway fought in the Battle of Britain, waged from July to October 1940. His Hurricane was damaged on 18 August while over the Thames Estuary, and he was forced to bail out. He was again shot down over Eastchurch on 26 August; making Hemingway 85 Squadron's first official combat victim over Britain. Five days later he damaged a Bf 109. On 3 September 1940, he was promoted to flying officer, and on 22 September made a forced landing due to poor weather near Church Fenton.

In 1941, 85 Squadron converted to Havoc II night-fighters. Hemingway was flying one of these on 13 May 1941 when its instruments failed in bad weather. He bailed out at low altitude, trying to avoid the tail which made this difficult, but his right hand hit the tail, breaking two fingers. He was able to pull his ripcord with the other hand but the parachute failed to open fully. His fall was broken by a tree and landing in a midden and so he survived with injured ankles. He was then mentioned in despatches and awarded the Distinguished Flying Cross.

Exhausted, Hemingway was given generally light duties for several months. On 7 July 1941, he began serving with No. 1452 Flight RAF at West Malling. On 1 January 1944, he was made a temporary squadron leader. He served as an air traffic controller during the Invasion of Normandy. From September 1944 to December 1945 he commanded No. 43 Squadron RAF, flying Spitfires. The squadron served in Italy, and Hemingway was shot down for a fourth time.

With the Second World War over, Hemingway remained in the RAF and was posted to the Middle East. He was promoted to flight lieutenant on 23 January 1946, and on 6 March 1946 was made a war substantive squadron leader. On 15 July 1948, Hemingway was promoted to squadron leader, and on 1 July 1954 to wing commander. Hemingway later served as station commander of RAF Leconfield, was staff officer at NATO in France, and finally served in the Air Ministry. Promoted to group captain on 1 January 1969, he retired on 12 September.

== Personal life and death ==
Hemingway married Bridget and had three children. Bridget died in 1998. He lived in Canada for a few years, but returned to Ireland in 2011. As of July 2018, he was one of the nine surviving members of The Few. By 2019, when he turned 100, he was living in a nursing home near Dublin. When William Clark died in May 2020, Hemingway became the last surviving airman of the Battle of Britain.

In 2024, Hemingway unveiled a series of five portraits by artist Dan Llywelyn Hall, entitled The Last of the Few, at the British Embassy in Dublin, marking his 105th birthday. In June 2024, Hemingway met with the daughter of the young girl who he claimed had saved him from Germans after he was shot down near the city of Ferrara, Italy, in 1945. The meeting in Dublin came about after Hemingway and his family made an appeal to meet the girl who had hidden him and saved his life.

Hemingway died on 17 March 2025, aged 105. The Royal Air Force called it "the end of an era", with British Prime Minister Keir Starmer and the Prince of Wales paying homage. The Coldstream Guards honoured him with music outside Buckingham Palace.

== See also ==
- Reinhard Hardegen, last surviving German U-boat commander, also died aged 105
