= Terry Clark (RAF officer) =

Battle of Britain veteran (1919–2020)

William Clark
- Born: William Terence Montague Clark; 11 April 1919; Croydon, Surrey, England
- Died: 7 May 2020 (aged 101); York, England
- Military career
- Allegiance: United Kingdom
- Branch: Royal Air Force
- Service years: 1938–1945
- Rank: Flight lieutenant
- Nickname: "Terry"
- Service number: 819004, later 126026
- Unit: No. 219 Squadron RAF
- Conflicts: Second World War: Battle of Britain
- Awards: Distinguished Flying Medal; Air Efficiency Award

William Terence Montague Clark, DFM, AE (11 April 1919 – 7 May 2020) was an English nightfighter navigator/radar operator in the Royal Air Force (RAF) from 1938 to 1945. He was the penultimate surviving airman of the Battle of Britain.

Clark enlisted in the Auxiliary Air Force in 1938 joining No. 615 Squadron at Kenley in March 1938 as an aircrafthand, then trained to be an aircraft gunner in Hawker Hectors on Army cooperation duties.

He joined No. 219 Squadron, then flying Bristol Blenheims, at Catterick on 12 July 1940, later training on radar as a radio observer, flying in Bristol Beaufighters in the Battle of Britain.

On the night of 16/17 April 1941 Clark flew with the commanding officer of 219 Squadron, Wing Commander T.G. Pike, when Pike's own navigator was taken ill. They intercepted and destroyed a Junkers Ju 88 and a Heinkel He 111 in the Guildford area.

During the night of 27/28 April 1941, flying with Flying Officer D.O. Hobbis, his regular pilot, Clark assisted in the destruction of an unidentified enemy aircraft, on each of 1/2 June and 13/14 June 1941 they shot down a Heinkel He 111.

Clark was awarded the Distinguished Flying Medal, which was gazetted on 8 July 1941. Commissioned as a Pilot Officer in May 1942, Clark had reached the rank of Flight Lieutenant by the end of the war. Post-war, Clark joined the reconstituted Royal Air Force Volunteer Reserve (RAFVR) in 1949 serving in the Fighter and Aircraft Control Branches before resigning his commission in 1954.

Clark died on 7 May 2020 at the age of 101, leaving John Hemingway as the last surviving member of The Few.
