= Josef František =

Czech fighter ace (1914–1940)

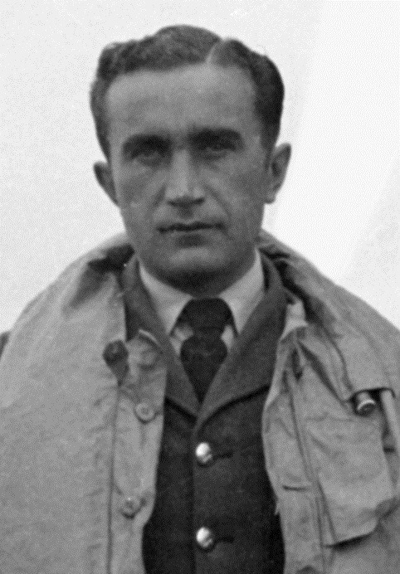
- Josef Frantisek, Summer 1940
- Born: 7 October 1914; Otaslavice, Austria-Hungary
- Died: 8 October 1940 (aged 26); Ewell, Surrey, England
- Burial place: Northwood, London, England
- Military career
- Allegiance: Czechoslovakia; Poland; France; United Kingdom
- Branch: Czechoslovak Air Force; Polish Air Force; Armée de l'Air; Royal Air Force
- Service years: 1934–1940
- Rank: Sergeant
- Service number: 793451
- Units: No. 303 Polish Fighter Squadron
- Conflicts: Second World War; Invasion of Poland; Battle of France; Battle of Britain
- Awards: Distinguished Flying Medal & Bar; Croix de guerre Silver Cross of the Virtuti Militari; Cross of Valour (3)

Josef František DFM & Bar (7 October 1914 – 8 October 1940) was a Czech fighter pilot and Second World War fighter ace who flew for the air forces of Czechoslovakia, Poland, France, and the United Kingdom. He was the highest-scoring non-British Allied ace in the Battle of Britain, with 17 confirmed victories and one probable, all gained in a period of four weeks in September 1940.

František was a brilliant pilot and combatant but frequently breached air force discipline first in Czechoslovakia, in France and Britain. The RAF found it best to let him patrol alone, a role in which he was highly successful. He was killed in a crash in October 1940 in the final week of the Battle of Britain.

== Life in Czechoslovakia ==
Josef František was born in 1914 in Otaslavice in Moravia, Austria-Hungary (now the Czech Republic), the son of a carpenter. After leaving school, he was apprenticed to a locksmith, but in 1934 he joined the Czechoslovak Air Force. He was trained at the Air Training School at Prostějov. In 1935, he was a corporal in the 1st Air Regiment. In 1936, he completed training and was posted to the 2nd Air Regiment at Olomouc in Moravia, where he flew Aero A.11 and Letov Š-328 reconnaissance biplanes. By 1937, he was a sergeant.

František got into trouble for fighting, returning late to his unit, and other breaches of discipline. He could have been dishonourably discharged, but he showed exceptional promise as a pilot, so he was sent to the 4th Air Regiment to train as a fighter pilot. In June 1938, he became a fighter pilot with the 40th Fighter Flight at Prague-Kbely flying Avia B-534 and Bk-534 biplane fighters. Here he developed his flying and combat skills.

On 30 September 1938, France and the United Kingdom allowed Germany to annex the Sudetenland, and on 15 March 1939 Germany occupied the remainder of Bohemia and Moravia. It imposed a Protectorate of Bohemia and Moravia with a puppet government that it ordered to disband its armed forces.

== Polish Air Force ==
Many Czechoslovak airmen covertly escaped over the border to Poland. František was one of a group of four that was smuggled across the border by train at Šumbark on 13 June. The group reported to the Czechoslovak Consulate in Kraków and was accommodated in a Czechoslovak transit camp at Bronowice Małe that had been converted from a disused Austro-Hungarian Army camp.

Initially, Poles showed no interest in Czechoslovak pilots. In July 1939, a party of Czechoslovak airmen including František and another future RAF ace, Karel Kuttelwascher, went to the Port of Gdynia to sail to France. On 29 July, they were about to embark on a Swedish cargo steamship, the Kastelholm. Meanwhile, by now, the Poles were already sure that the German invasion was inevitable. While Czechoslovak pilots were preparing for departure, they received an offer to join the Polish Air Force, to which some agreed. František was in a group of friends that tossed a coin to decide. It landed "tails", so they stayed in Poland. In total, eight Slovaks and thirteen Czechs joined the Polish Air Force.

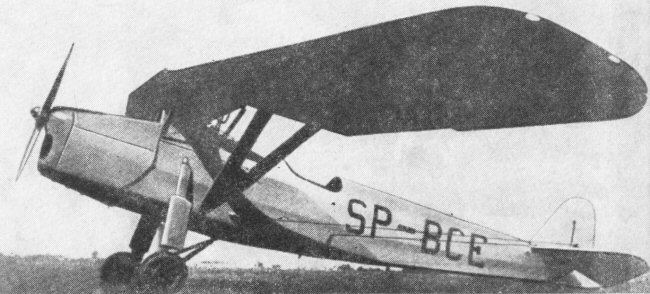
A Polish RWD 8 aircraft

František and his group retrained on Polish aircraft at Dęblin airbase in Małopolska. František was made an instructor, flying obsolescent Potez 25, Breguet 19, PWS-26, RWD 8, RWD-14 Czapla and Lublin R-XIII aircraft.

On 1 September 1939 Germany invaded Poland, and on the morning of 2 September a Luftwaffe air raid destroyed Dęblin airbase. František's unit evacuated its surviving aircraft to Góra Puławska, further to the southeast. On one patrol from Góra Puławska a fellow Czechoslovak pilot, Zdeněk Škavarda, was flying a Breguet 19 when he ran out of fuel, made a forced landing near German lines and was at risk of capture. František landed nearby and rescued him.

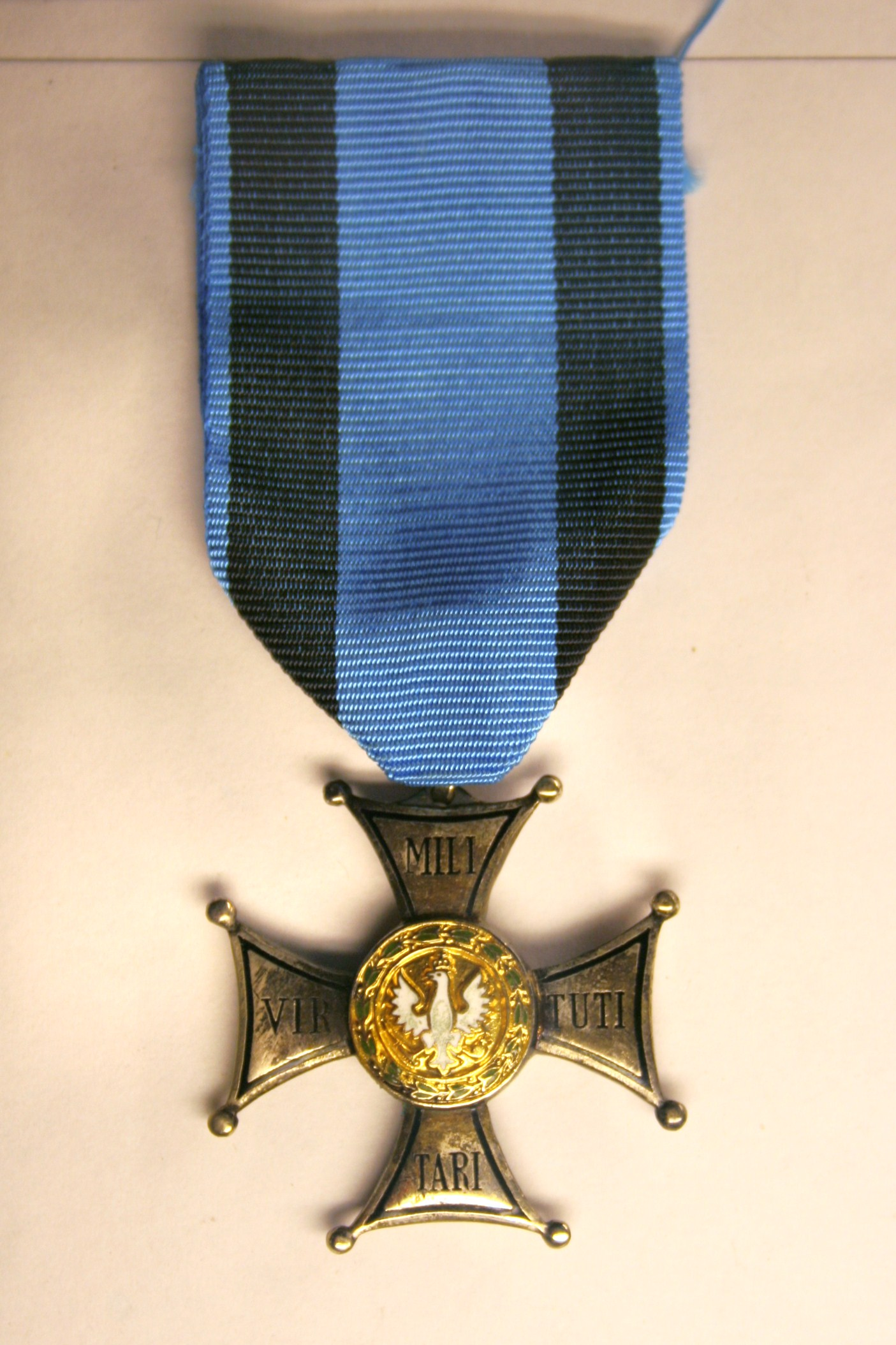
Poland awarded František decorations including the Virtuti Militari 5th class

František's unit retreated again, to Sosnowice Wielke airfield near Parczew. From 7 September he flew reconnaissance missions in unarmed 2-person RWD 8 and PWS-25 training aircraft, carrying an observer. On 19–20 September he attacked enemy columns near Kamionka Strumiłowa, throwing hand grenades at German troops below. On 20 September his aircraft was damaged by enemy fire from the ground so he made a forced landing near Złoczów. Two other pilots, one of whom was another Czechoslovak, landed and rescued František and his Polish observer.

For his Polish service František was awarded the Virtuti Militari 5th class and received the Cross of Valour four times.

On 22 September, František's unit was ordered to withdraw with its remaining aircraft to Romania. The unit flew first to Ispas in Bukovina, and then via various airfields eventually to Pipera near Bucharest, where it was interned by the Romanian authorities. But many interned members of the Polish Air Force escaped. They included a group of four Czechoslovak airmen nicknamed the "Czech Cloverleaf": František, Josef Balejka, Vilém Košař (one of the pilots who had landed to rescue František after his forced landing in Poland) and Matěj Pavlovič. The four went to Constanța, whence a Romanian cargo steamship, the Dacia, took them to Beirut in French-ruled Lebanon.

== France ==
In Beirut, a week later, the four embarked on a Messageries Maritimes cargo ship, the Theophile Gautier, which landed them at Marseille on 20 October 1939. There a Polish sergeant recognised their Polish war decorations and helped to get them to join the new Free Polish Air Force at le Bourget.

Once in France, escaped Czechoslovak airmen were being retrained to fly l'Armée d'Air equipment. Košař was a naturalised Polish citizen but with Balejka, František and Pavlovič went to see the Czechoslovak Air Attaché to ask to be transferred to join fellow Czechoslovaks in l'Armée d'Air. The attaché accused them of deserting the Polish Air Force, so František accused the Czechoslovak Air Force of failing to evacuate its aircraft to Poland when Germany invaded in March 1939, whereupon the attaché called the French police. The police found the trio's Polish military identity documents to be in order and refused to arrest them. Balejka, František and Pavlovič remained with their Free Polish units.

František was posted to a Polish airbase at Clermont-Ferrand where he served as a mechanic. He tried to learn to fly as many types of French aircraft as he could. He also got into trouble several times for going absent without leave. There are no official French records to confirm he flew combat missions during the Battle of France, though some older sources credit him with 11 victories: nine in the air and two on the ground. In his home town of Otaslavice there is a museum in his memory and its collection of his medals includes a Croix de Guerre. His French Air Force records are known to have been destroyed, so there is no official confirmation of whether or why the cross was awarded to him.

== Royal Air Force ==
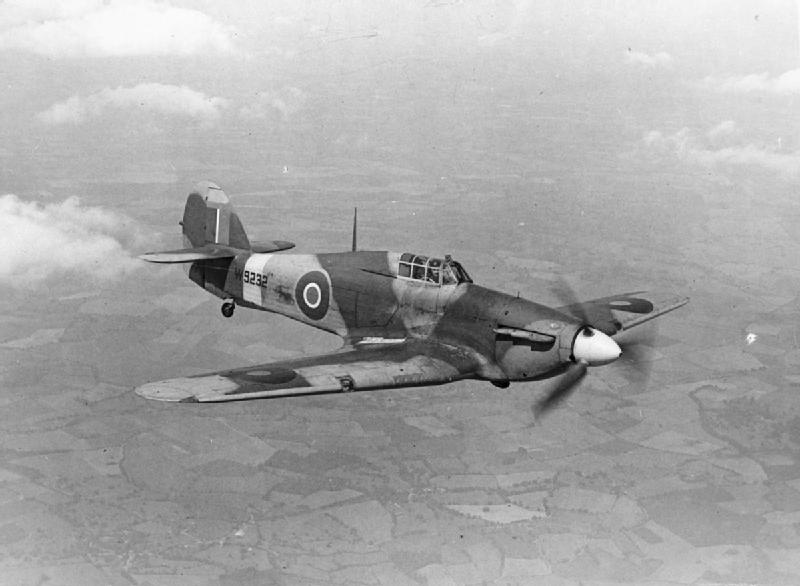
A Hawker Hurricane Mk I based at RAF Northolt, where František served in Polish No. 303 Squadron

After France surrendered, František fled to Britain and after training on 2 August was assigned to Polish No. 303 Squadron based at RAF Northolt, flying Hawker Hurricane fighters. František was used to obsolescent aircraft with fixed landing gear, and on 8 August at the end of a training flight, he forgot to lower his Hurricane's retractable undercarriage and accidentally made a belly landing. He was unhurt, and the aircraft was repairable. The squadron entered action in the last phase of the Battle of Britain. František's first confirmed victory was shooting down a Messerschmitt Bf 109E fighter on 2 September 1940. His fifth victory nearly cost him his life. On 6 September he shot down a Bf 109E of III/JG 52 near Sevenoaks in Kent, but František's Hurricane was damaged so badly that he had to make a forced landing near Falmer.

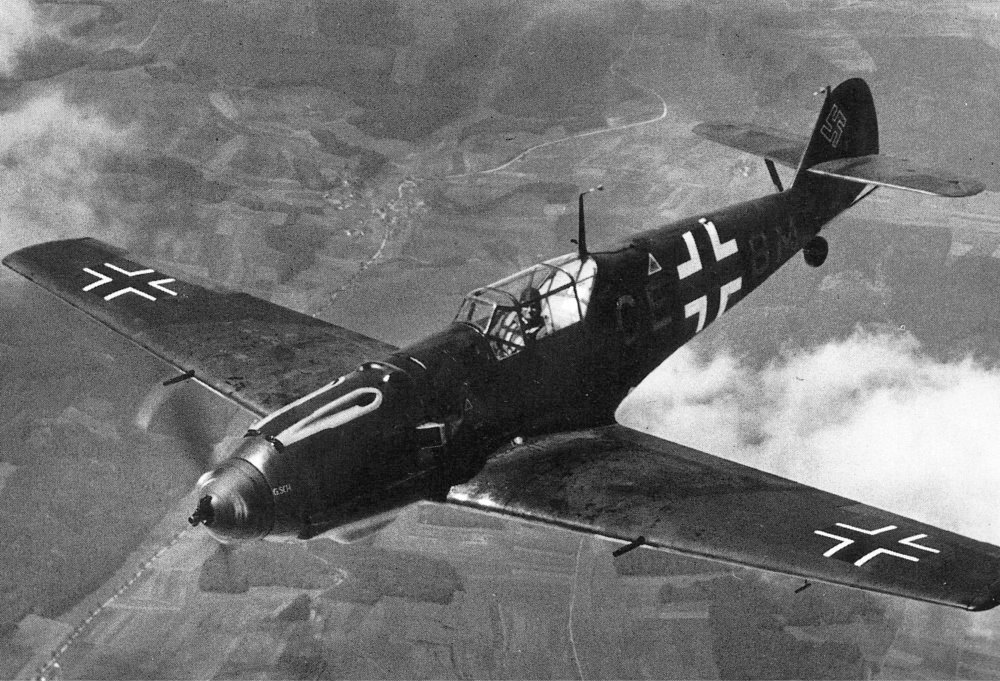
A Messerschmitt Bf 109 fighter. František shot down nine Bf 109s in September 1940.

An unruly pilot, he was seen by his commanding officers as a danger to his colleagues when flying in formation. His British CO, Squadron Leader Ronald Kellett, offered to get František transferred to a Czech squadron. František, perhaps due to his clash with the Czechoslovak air attaché in Paris, chose to stay with his Polish colleagues. As all pilots were valuable, a compromise was reached whereby František was allotted a "spare" aircraft so he could fly as a "guest" of the squadron as and when he wanted. Thus František fought his own private war – accompanying the squadron into the air and peeling off to fly a lone patrol over Kent, patrolling in the area through which he knew the German aircraft being intercepted would fly on their way back to base, possibly damaged and low on fuel and ammunition.

Between 2 and 30 September he shot down 17 German aircraft and 1 probable, including nine Bf 109 fighters, six Heinkel He 111 bombers and one Junkers Ju 88 bomber. This made him one of the top scoring Allied fighter pilots of the Battle of Britain and on 20 September, King George VI decorated him with the Distinguished Flying Medal. A bar was later added to his DFM. His final confirmed victory was a Bf 109 near Brooklands in Surrey on 30 September 1940.

On 8 October 1940, František's Hurricane crashed in Ewell, Surrey, on return from a patrol. The cause is not known. It has been suggested that it might have been a result of battle fatigue and physical exhaustion. František is buried in the military section of Northwood cemetery in Middlesex, with a Polish headstone and alongside Polish and British RAF colleagues.

== Legacy ==
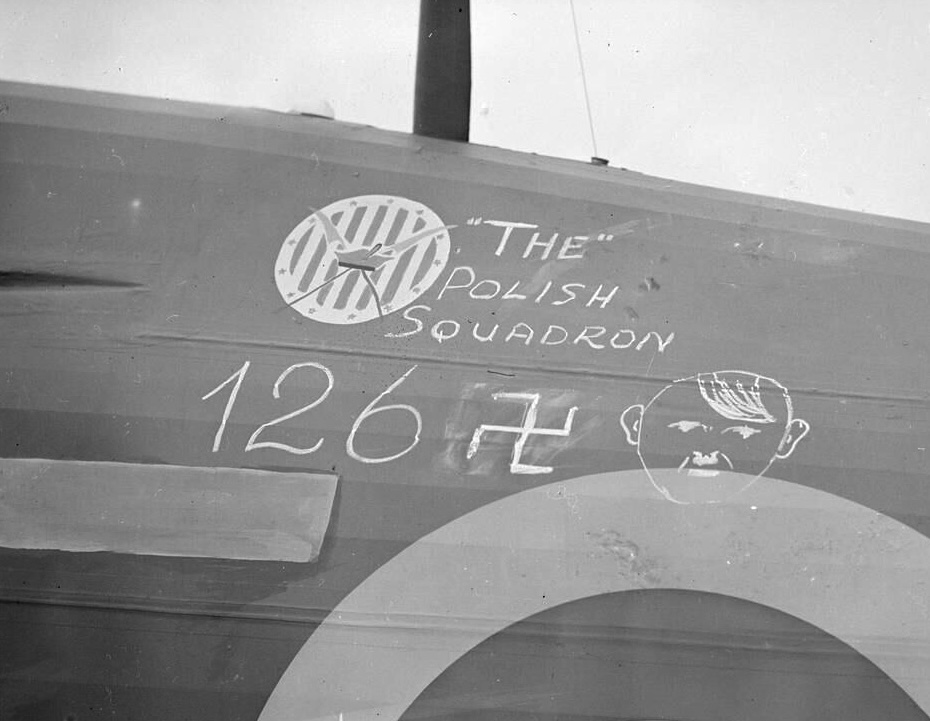
František's 17 aerial victories greatly helped No. 303 Squadron to become the highest-scoring Royal Air Force (RAF) squadron in the Battle of Britain.

František was the first non-British pilot to have a bar added to his Distinguished Flying Medal when he posthumously received one on 28 October 1940. In 1942, Air Vice-Marshal Karel Janoušek called František an "almost legendary figure". Janoušek also quoted the anonymous author of the 1941 book Together we Fly, A Salute to Airmen, who called František "the greatest of all Czechoslovak pilots, perhaps one of the greatest fighters of all time". In Otaslavice there is a museum in František's memory, a monument outside the František family home, and a plaque outside the local primary school. A street in the Černý Most suburb of Prague is named "Františkova" after him. The centenary of his birth was commemorated in Otaslavice on 4 October 2014. On 6 October 2015 the Polish Institute in Prague commemorated the 75th anniversary of František's death. Wreaths and floral tributes continue to be laid on his birthday each year at the monument outside the family home in Otaslavice. On 4 September 2022 a memorial was unveiled on Priest Hill in Ewell, England, not far from the place he died.

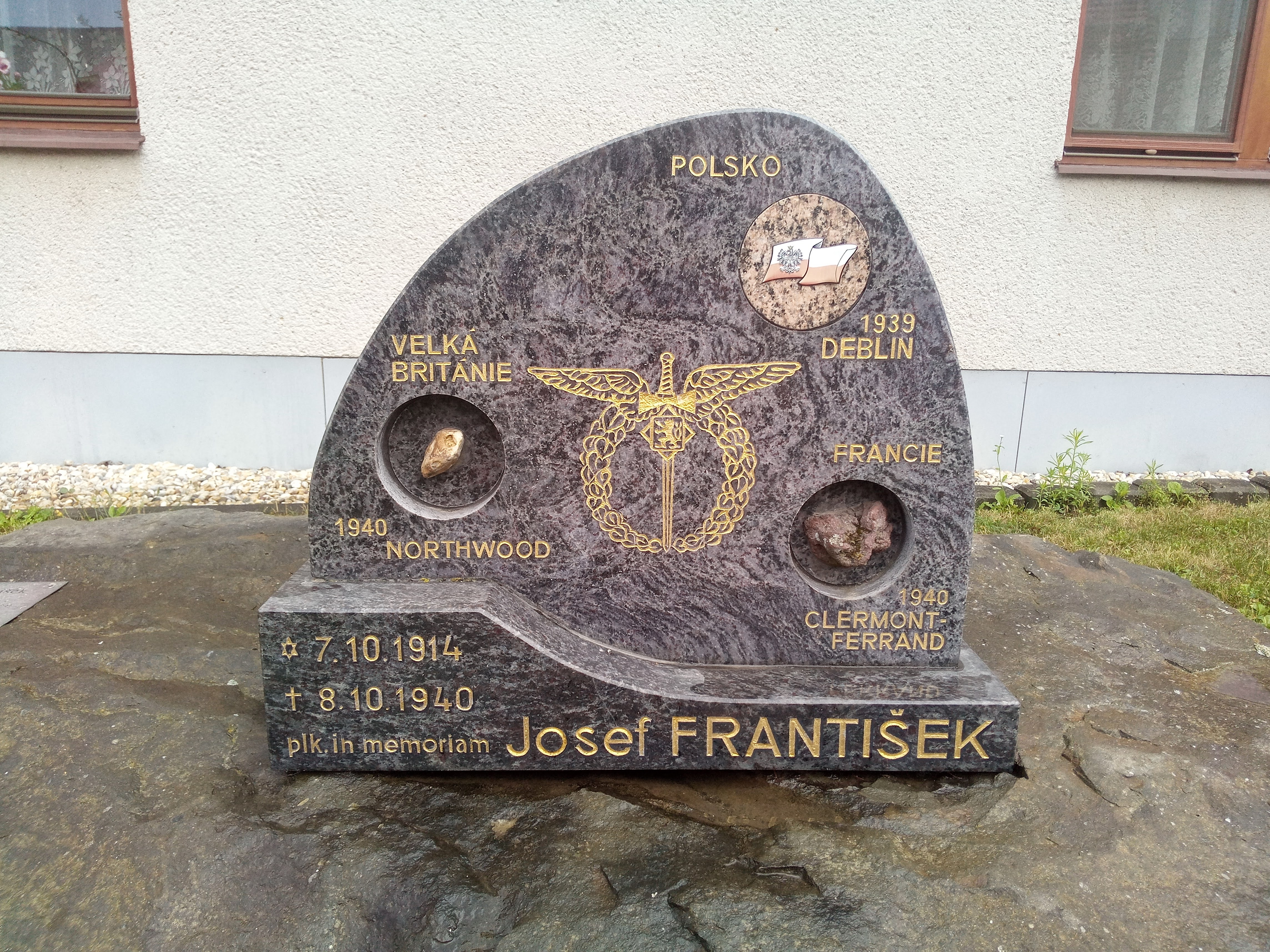
Memorial stone in Otaslavice, Czechia

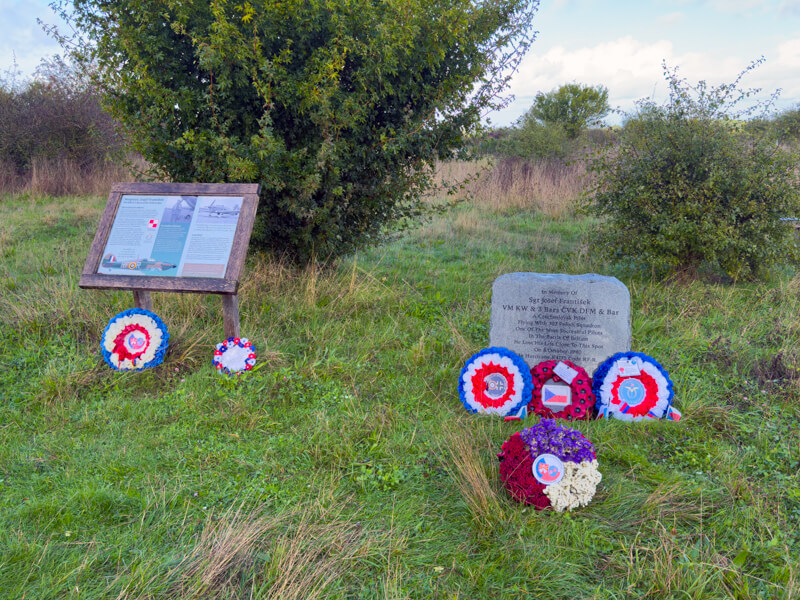
Josef František memorial at Priest Hill, unveiled 4 September 2022.

== Honours and awards ==
Virtuti Militari Silver Cross (Poland)
Cross of Valour 4 times (Poland)
Croix de guerre with palm leaf (France)
Distinguished Flying Medal and bar (United Kingdom) (1 Oct. 1940, 28 Oct. 1940)
1939–1945 Star with Battle of Britain clasp
Czechoslovak War Cross 1939
Czechoslovak Za chrabrost před nepřítelem ("Bravery in Face of the Enemy")
Czechoslovak Za zásluhy, 2. stupně ("Medal of Merit, Second Class")

Posthumously the president of Czech Republic, Miloš Zeman awarded him the Order of the White Lion 1st Class Military Division on 28 Oct. 2015. In 2017, the Czech Mint issued silver and gold commemorative coins (under the authority of Niue) paying tribute to Josef František.

== In popular culture ==
Josef František was portrayed by Kryštof Hádek in the 2018 film Hurricane: 303 Squadron while Maciej Cymorek portrayed František in the film 303 Squadron. He was also referenced by Polish rock band Elektryczne Gitary in the song "Pilot Josef František", as a part of their 2016 album "Czasowniki".

Josef František was portrayed by Tadeáš Moravec in a film Lone Wolf.
