= Priest Hill =

Nature reserve in Ewell, Surrey, England

Coordinates: 51.339°N 0.236°W

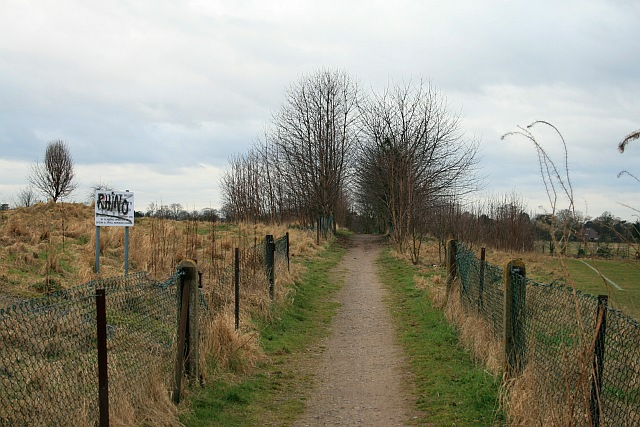
- Bridleway across Priest Hill
- Interactive map of Priest Hill
- Type: Nature reserve
- Location: Ewell, Surrey
- OS grid: TQ230615
- Area: 35 ha (86 acres)
- Manager: Surrey Wildlife Trust

Priest Hill is a 35-hectare (86-acre) nature reserve on the eastern outskirts of Ewell, near Epsom in north Surrey. It is managed by the Surrey Wildlife Trust. It is a Site of Nature Conservation Importance.

More than 1,500 t (1,700 tons) of tarmac and rubble were cleared from these former playing fields to create a grassland nature reserve. Three ponds have been created and green hay from another reserve has been spread over some areas to introduce the seeds of wild flowers such as kidney vetch.

There is access from Reigate Road and Banstead Road. Some areas are closed to the public.

== History ==
The nature reserve was formerly part of Priesthill Farm. The land is first recorded as Presthull and Prestshull in 1408. In the 16th century, it appears in documents as Prystishyll and Pristeshell. In the early 20th century, the land, which covered 24 acres (9.7 ha), was owned by Sir Arthur Glyn and was rented to a tenant farmer.

Following Glyn's death in 1942, Priesthill Farm was purchased by the London and Surrey County Councils under the provisions of the Education Act 1944. The western part of the site was to be a new technical college and the remaining 200 acres (81 ha) would be used as playing fields. Construction work on the new college, now the North East Surrey College of Technology, began in September 1951 and was completed two years later.

The northeastern part of the site was developed into an outdoor sports centre by the Inner London Education Authority. At its peak, it included athletics facilities, 30 hard tennis courts, 18 football pitches, 12 cricket nets, nine rugby pitches and eight hockey pitches. It catered primarily to children from in the inner London boroughs and its location in north Surrey meant that most users had to be transported to the site by bus. The facility was never used to its full potential, particularly during and after the 1970s energy crisis, which caused the price of vehicle fuel to increase sharply. The site was purchased by the Greater London Council in 1984 for £575,000 and, following the council's abolition, it passed to the London Residuary Board two years later.

In the late 1980s, it was offered to Epsom and Ewell Borough Council on a tenancy at will basis. Although funding was secured from the Sports Council to open the tennis courts during the school summer holidays, the majority of the facility was unused. In the early 1990s, the freehold was acquired by Combined Counties Properties (CCP) and the site was used to host car boot sales and a small area was leased to Old Suttonians Football Club. CCP intended to develop the site, but its position in the Metropolitan Green Belt reduced the potential for construction of new buildings and plans for an 80-bedroom hotel and golf course were turned down by the borough council.

In the early 2010s, a nature reserve covering 85 acres (34 ha) was created on the eastern part of the site. Around 1,500 t (1,700 tons) of tarmac and rubble were removed from the former sports centre, some of which was reused to create hibernation sites for reptiles and amphibians. Three ponds were dug and hay from the nearby Howell Hill nature reserve was spread, to encourage the growth of wild flowers. The work was funded by the construction of 15 houses and the ownership of the land was transferred from CCP to Surrey Wildlife Trust.

== Memorial to Josef František ==
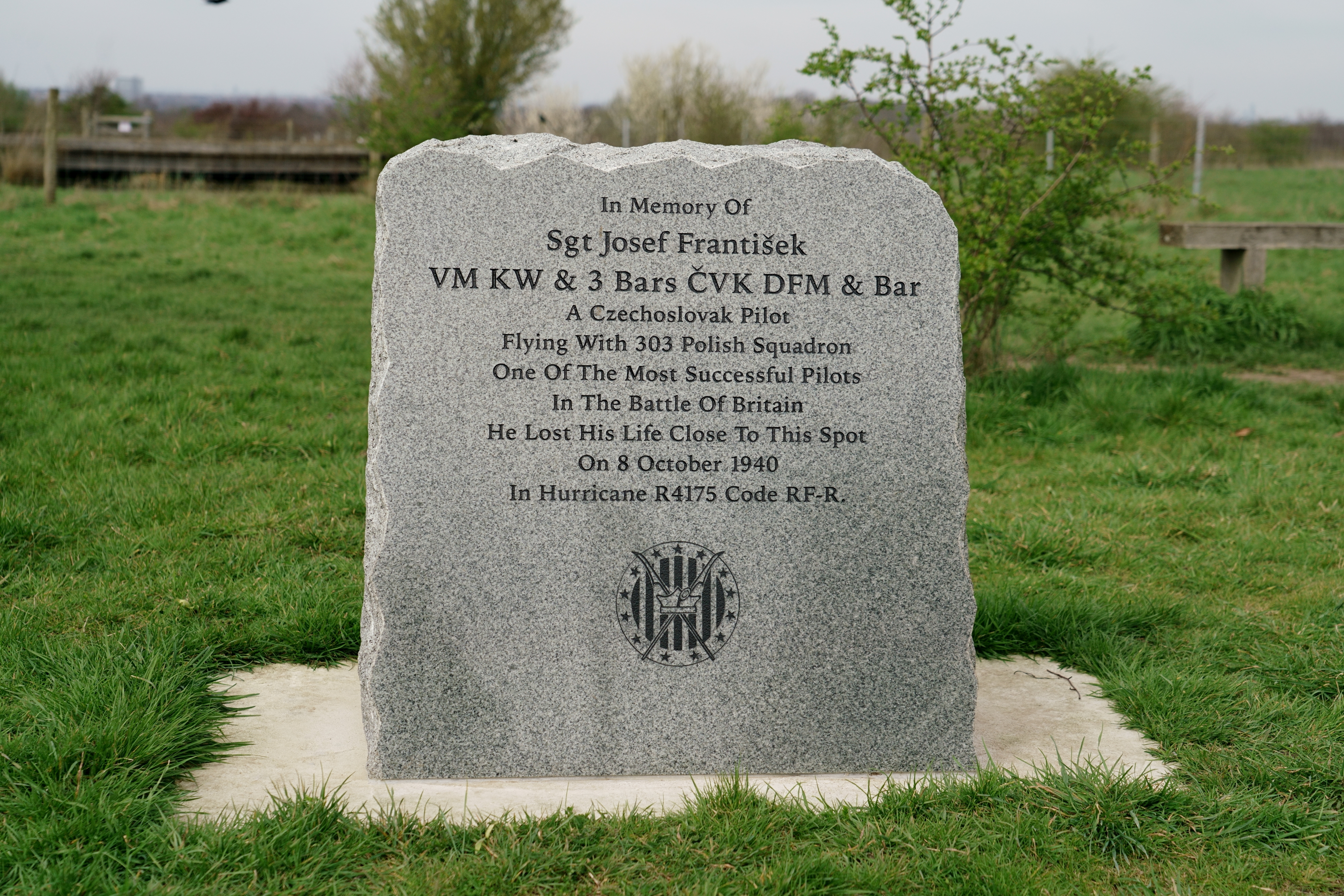
Memorial stone to Josef František

Josef František was a Czechoslovak fighter ace. During the Second World War, he flew for the air forces of Czechoslovakia, Poland, France and the UK. On 8 October 1940, as he was returning from a patrol mission, his Hurricane crashed close to Priest Hill. On 4 September 2022, a memorial stone was unveiled at the nature reserve, not far from the place where he died.
