= The Few =

British RAF airmen in the Battle of Britain

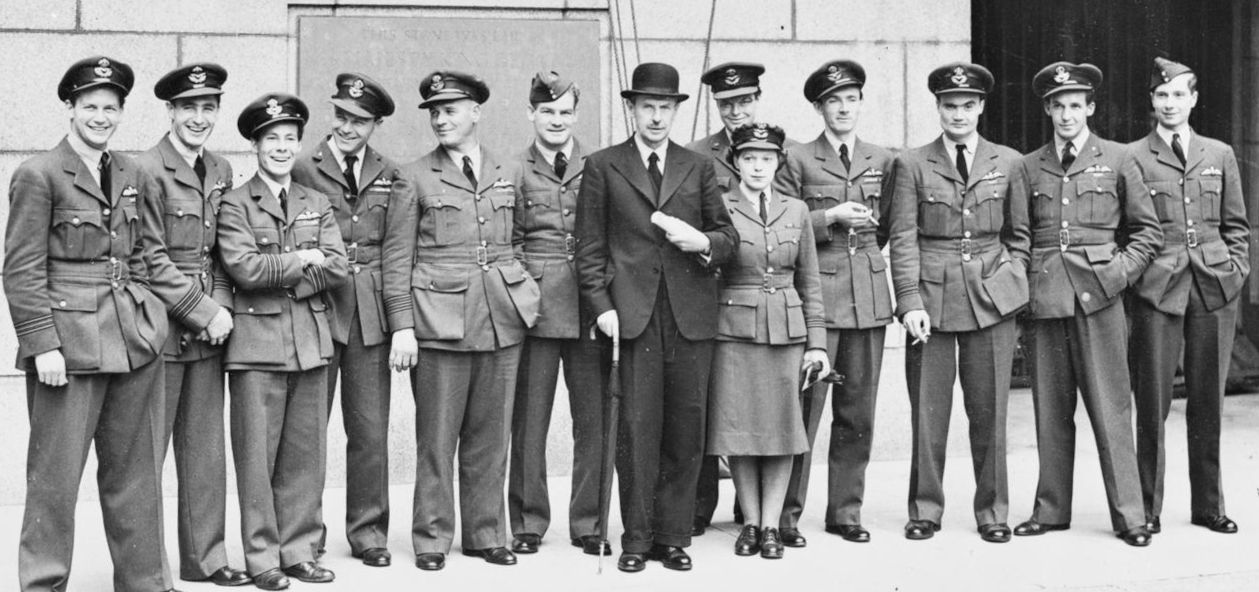
Hugh Dowding with some of "The Few"

The Few were the airmen of the Royal Air Force (RAF) and the aviators of the Fleet Air Arm, Royal Navy (RN) who fought the Battle of Britain in the Second World War. The term comes from Winston Churchill's phrase "Never, in the field of human conflict, was so much owed by so many to so few." It also alludes to Shakespeare's famous speech in his play, Henry V: "We few, we happy few, we band of brothers..."

== Aircrew ==
Nearly 3,000 men were awarded the "Battle of Britain" clasp. Six of the seven longest surviving veterans of the battle (Squadron Leader John Hart, Flight Lieutenant Archie McInnes, Flight Lieutenant Maurice Mounsdon, Air Vice-Marshal John Thornett Lawrence, Wing Commander Paul Farnes and Flight Lieutenant William Clark) died between June 2019 and May 2020 as of 8 May 2020. The last survivor of The Few, Group Captain John Hemingway, died on 17 March 2025, aged 105. The Royal Air Force called it "the end of an era".

By one tally, British RAF aircrew numbered 2,353 (80%) of the total of 2,927 flyers involved, with 407 Britons killed from a total of 510 losses. The remainder were not British, many coming from parts of the British Empire (particularly New Zealand, Canada, Australia, and South Africa), as well as exiles from many conquered European nations, particularly from Poland and Czechoslovakia. Other countries supplying smaller numbers included Belgium, France, Ireland (serving in the RAF as Ireland was officially neutral), Southern Rhodesia and the United States.

== Legacy ==
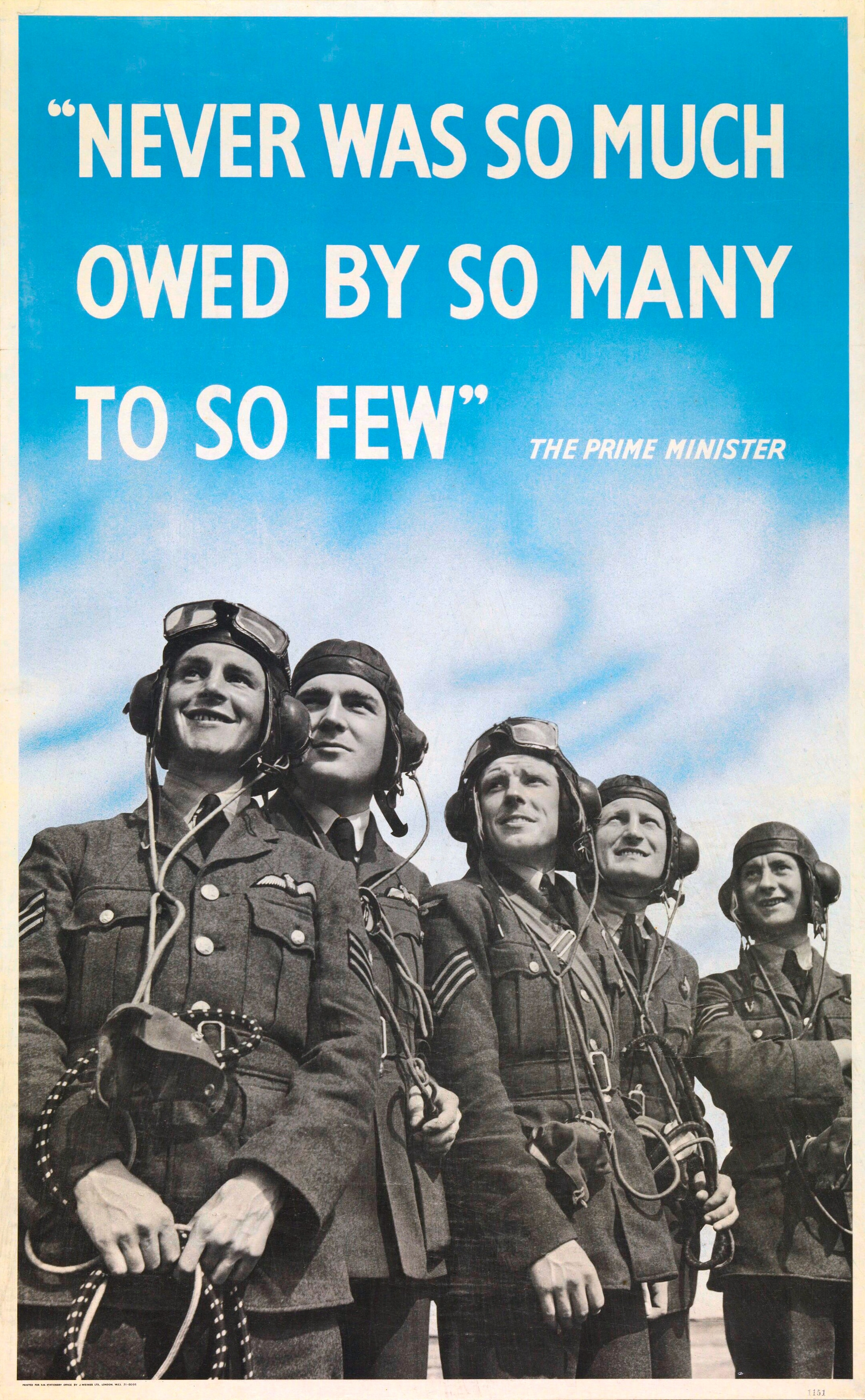
World War II poster containing the famous lines by Winston Churchill

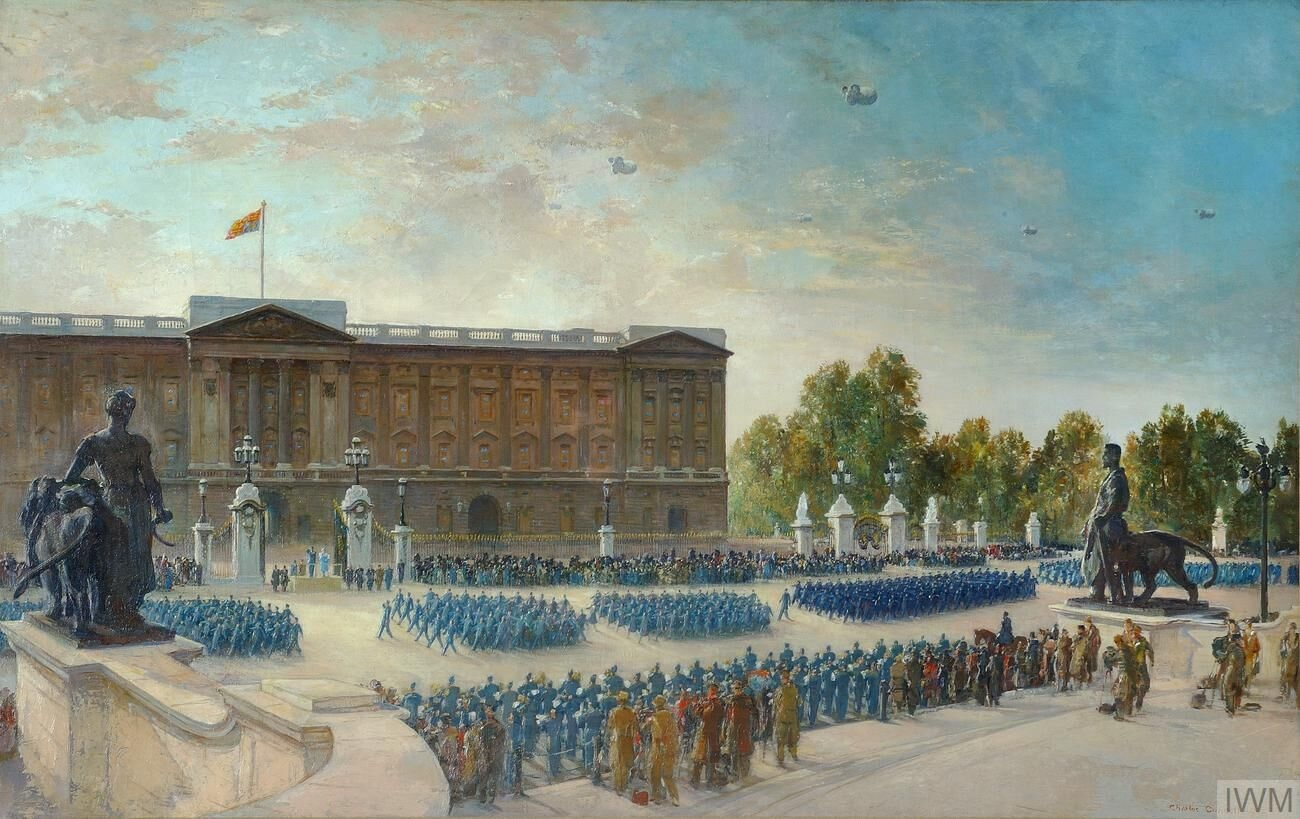
The Battle of Britain anniversary parade at Buckingham Palace in 1943.

On 20 August 1940 Winston Churchill summed up the effect of the battle and the contribution of RAF Fighter Command, RAF Bomber Command, RAF Coastal Command and the Fleet Air Arm with the words, "Never in the field of human conflict was so much owed by so many to so few". Pilots who fought in the battle have been known as The Few ever since; at times being specially commemorated on 15 September, "Battle of Britain Day". On this day in 1940, the Luftwaffe embarked on their largest bombing attack yet, forcing the engagement of the entirety of RAF 11 Group in defence of London and the South East, which resulted in a decisive British victory that proved to mark a turning point in Britain's favour.

== Memorials ==
The aircrew are remembered on the Battle of Britain Memorial, Capel-le-Ferne, Kent, and their names are listed on the Battle of Britain Monument in London. The Battle of Britain Roll of Honour is held in Westminster Abbey in the RAF Chapel, and is paraded annually during the Service of Thanksgiving and re-dedication on Battle of Britain Sunday.

There is a preserved Hawker Hurricane fighter aircraft known as "The Last of The Many"—a reference to the 1942 film The First of the Few starring Leslie Howard as R.J. Mitchell, designer of the Spitfire—which flies as part of the Battle of Britain Memorial Flight, along with a Supermarine Spitfire that flew in the Battle (one of five Spitfires in the Memorial Flight). As the Hurricane was the last production model of that type, it did not itself fly in the Battle.

In 2022 a sculpture, the Spirit of the Few Monument, was unveiled at the Kent Battle of Britain Museum.

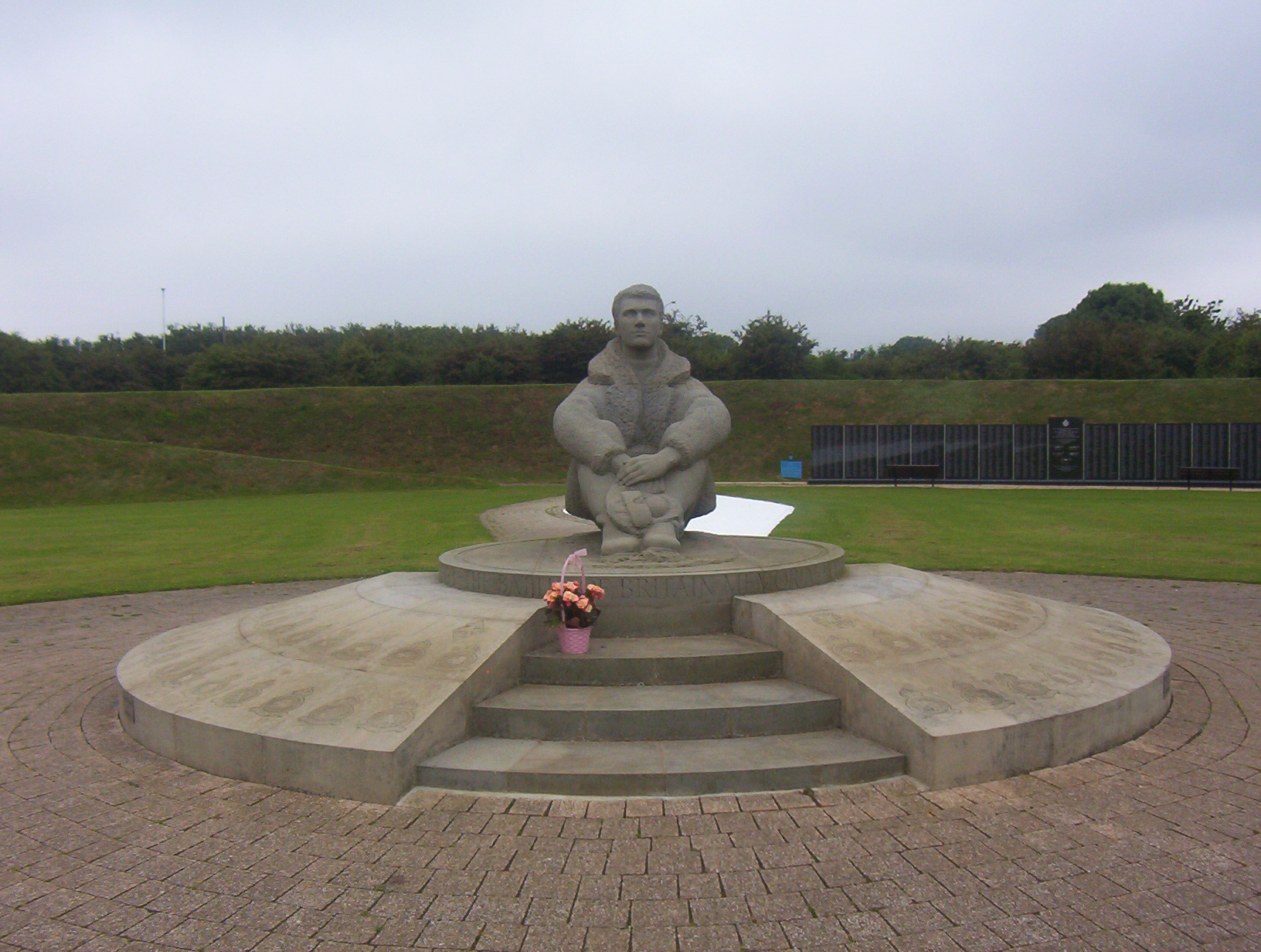
The memorial to The Few at Capel-le-Ferne, atop the white cliffs of Dover

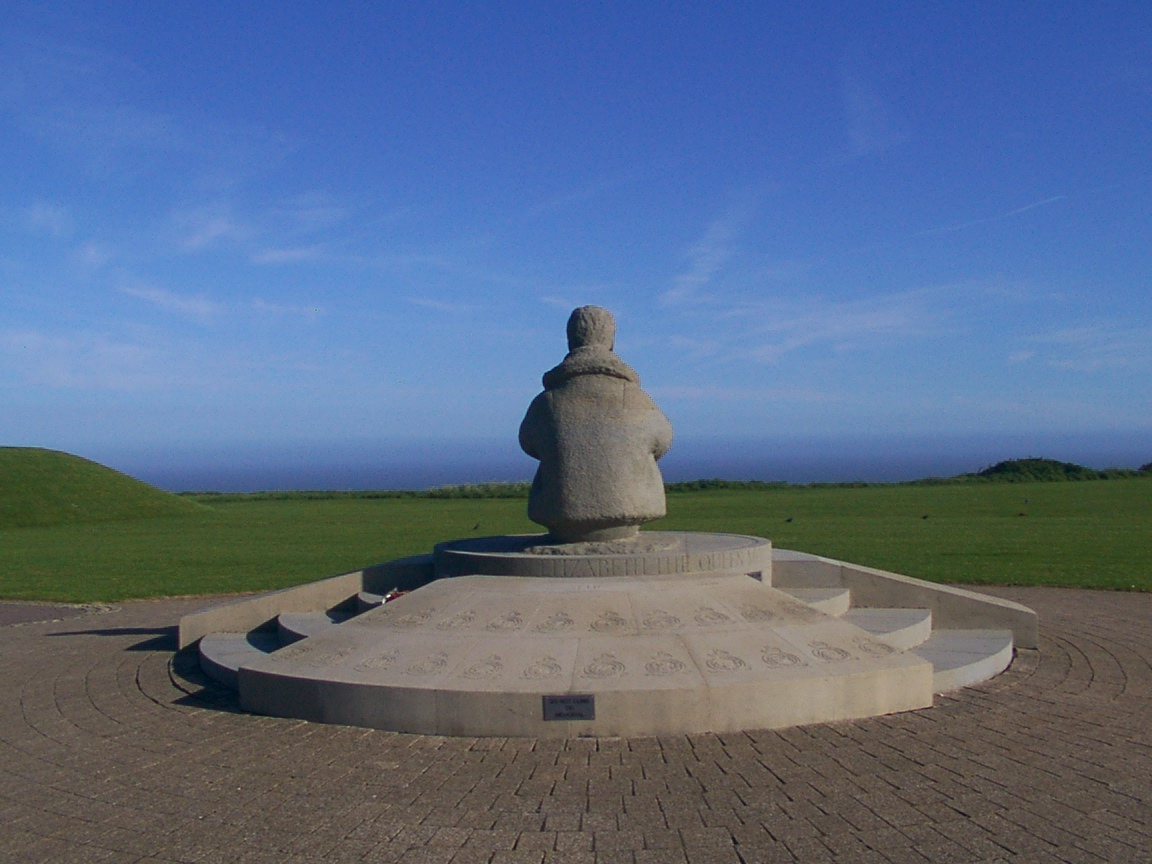
... which faces the English Channel

== Statistics ==
The Battle of Britain was considered officially by the RAF to have been fought between 10 July and 31 October 1940.

- RAF pilots claimed to have shot down about 2,600 German aircraft, but figures compiled later suggest that Luftwaffe losses were more likely nearer 2,300.
- Of 2,332 Allied pilots who flew fighters in the Battle, 38.90 per cent could claim some success in terms of enemy aircraft shot down.
- The number of pilots claiming more than one victory amounted to no more than 15 per cent of the total RAF pilots involved.
- To be proclaimed an "ace" a pilot had to have at least five confirmed victories. During the Battle of Britain just 188 RAF pilots achieved that distinction – eight per cent of the total involved. A further 237 of those RAF pilots claiming successes during the Battle became "aces" later in the war.
- There were four pilots who were "ace in a day" in the Battle of Britain: Archie McKellar (British), Antoni Głowacki (Polish), Ronald Hamlyn (British) and Brian Carbury (New Zealander).

=== Leading aces ===
The leading aces of the Battle of Britain (between 10 July and 31 October 1940) were:

Rank	Pilot	Nationality	Squadron	Aircraft	Kills	Notes
1	Flt Lt Eric Lock	United Kingdom	41	Spitfire	21	Total 26 kills. MIA 3 August 1941.
2	Sqn Ldr Archie McKellar	United Kingdom	605	Hurricane	19	Total 21 (possibly 22) three probable and three damaged. 5 Bf 109's on 7 October 1940. KIA 1 November 1940.
3	Sgt James Lacey	United Kingdom	501	Hurricane	18 (23 by end of November)	Total 28 kills.
4	Sgt Josef František	(Czech Republic) Czechoslovakia	303	Hurricane	17	Killed 8 October 1940.
5	Fg Off Brian Carbury	New Zealand	603	Spitfire	15 + 1/2	
6	Fg Off Witold Urbanowicz	Poland	145 and 303	Hurricane	15	Total 18 (possibly 20) kills.
7	Plt Off Colin Gray	New Zealand	54	Spitfire	14 + 1/2	Total 27.7 kills.
8	Plt Off Bob Doe	United Kingdom	234 and 238	Spitfire / Hurricane	14 (+ 2 shared)	
9	Flt Lt Paterson Hughes	Australia	234	Spitfire	14 + 5/6	KIA 7 September 1940.
10	Sqn Ldr Michael Crossley	United Kingdom	32	Hurricane	14	Wartime total 22 victories.

=== Other notable Battle of Britain pilots ===
- Willie McKnight, 17 + 1/2 kills by 18 September 1940, 6 + 1/2 kills during the Battle
- David Moore Crook
- Alan Deere
- Harbourne Stephen
- Paddy Finucane
- A.G. "Sailor" Malan
- James Brindley Nicolson VC
- Albert Gerald Lewis
- Stanisław Skalski
- Jan Zumbach
- Geoffrey Wellum
- John Hemingway, who was the last surviving pilot of the Battle of Britain
- Brian "Sandy" Lane
- Tom Neil
- Ray Holmes
- Douglas Bader
- Robert Stanford Tuck
- Billy Fiske
