= Lone Wolf (2026 film) =

- Directed by: Ondřej Veverka
- Written by: Ondřej Veverka; Petr Pelech
- Starring: Tadeáš Moravec; Viktor Zavadil; Piotr Trojan
- Cinematography: Kryštof Tichý
- Music by: Jakub Řehoř
- Production companies: Rolling Media; Czech Television; QQ studio Magic Lab
- Distributed by: Falcon
- Release date: 26 August 2026
- Running time: 94 Minutes
- Country: Czech Republic
- Languages: Czech; German; Polish; English
- Box office: 1,253,616 CZK

Lone Wolf (Czech: Osamělý vlk) is a 2026 Czech war docudrama directed by Ondřej Veverka. The film follows the life and wartime career of Josef František, a Czechoslovak fighter pilot who served in the Royal Air Force (RAF) during the World War II and became the highest-scoring non-British Allied ace during the Battle of Britain and one of the most successful fighter pilots of the 303 Polish Squadron during the Battle of Britain.

The film was released theatrically in the Czech Republic on 27 August 2026.

== Plot ==
The film follows Josef František's life from the German occupation of Czechoslovakia through his service in Poland and France to his eventual involvement with the Royal Air Force in Britain.

A substantial part of the film focuses on František's service with No. 303 Squadron RAF during the Battle of Britain in 1940. Through a series of aerial combat sequences, the film depicts his achievements as a fighter pilot and his reputation for courage and exceptional flying ability.

The film also explores František's personality and his relationship with military discipline and authority. His exceptional abilities as a pilot are contrasted with his independent character and difficulties in conforming to military regulations.

== Cast ==
- Tadeáš Moravec as Josef František
- Viktor Zavadil as Josef Balejka
- Piotr Trojan as Witold Urbanowicz
- Kryštof Grygar as Zdeněk Škarvada
- Josef Trojan as František Fajtl
- Jan Nedbal
- Miroslav Hanuš
- Jan Budař
- Tomáš Matušinec
- Grzegorz Widera
- Marcin Kaleta as Wilhelm Kosarz

== Production ==
The film was directed by Ondřej Veverka, who co-wrote the screenplay with Petr Pelech. According to the film's production and distribution materials, Vítězslav Jandák Jr. also contributed to the screenplay.

The cinematographer was Kryštof Tichý, while the musical score was composed by Jakub Řehoř. The film was produced by Rolling Media, with Czech Television, QQ studio and Magic Lab among the co-production partners.

Filming took place at several locations in the Czech Republic and Poland. Locations included the former military barracks in Ostrava-Koblov, other locations in the Moravian-Silesian Region, Kbely Airport in Prague, and locations in Kraków, Poland. Historical RAF-related environments were reconstructed for the production.

The film combines scripted dramatic sequences with documentary elements, visual reconstructions and archival footage.

== Release ==
A world premiere was held on 20 August 2026 in Prostějov, a town associated with Josef František's life.

The film's Czech theatrical release took place on 27 August 2026. It is distributed in the Czech Republic by Falcon.
