= Margaret Harrison (peace campaigner) =

Scottish activist

Margaret Harrison (5 May 1918 – 15 April 2015) was a Scottish peace campaigner and anti-nuclear activist.

== Biography ==
Harrison was 5 May 1918 in Dumbarton, Scotland. She was raised as a Christian.

Harrison was active in the British anti-nuclear weapons movement and was the co-founder of the Faslane Peace Camp by the Clyde Naval Base on the Gare Loch in June 1982. In 1999, a Faslane Peace Camp caravan previously used by activists was put on display in an exhibition at the Riverside Museum in Glasgow .

Harrison was arrested at least 14 times on protests against the Polaris nuclear weapons programme based in the Holy Loch at Dunoon and against the Trident missiles based on the Firth of Clyde.

She also participated in peace and protests across Britain, including at demonstrations at the Atomic Weapons Research Establishment at Aldermaston in Berkshire, at the RAF Greenham Common Women's Peace Camp in Berkshire, and at the United States Air Base at Molesworth in Cambridgeshire. She was thrown out of the House of Commons in 1991.

Harrison was awarded the Freedom of Dumbarton in recognition of her activism.

Harrison was married to fellow activist Bobby Harrison. She died on 15 April 2015 in Castle Douglas, aged 96.
