= Alexander McKee (author) =

Journalist and author (1918–1992)

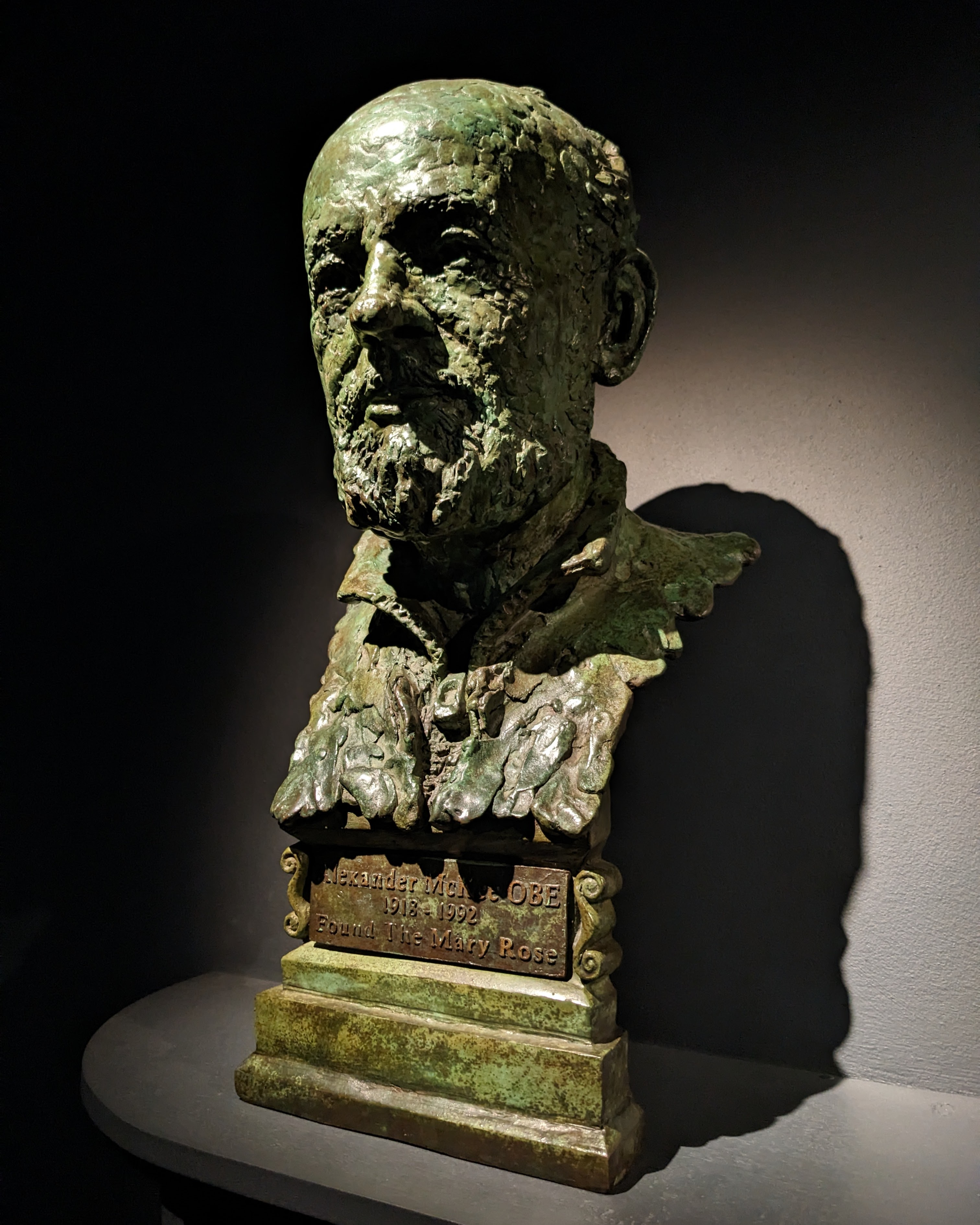
- Sculpture of McKee by Luke Shepherd on display at the Mary Rose Museum
- Born: 25 July 1918; Ipswich, Suffolk
- Died: 22 July 1992 (aged 73); Hampshire, England
- Other name: Alexander Paul Charrier McKee
- Occupations: Author and diver
- Known for: Discovery of the Mary Rose shipwreck

Alexander Paul Charrier McKee OBE (25 July 1918 – 22 July 1992) was a British journalist, military historian, and diver who published nearly thirty books.

== Life ==
McKee was educated mostly by a series of governesses, from whom he acquired an acute eye for the quality of evidence. However, his lack of paper qualifications was to prove a serious hindrance to his later career. The most unusual thing he did in his youth was to fly solo at the age of fifteen.

In the Second World War, McKee served in the British Army and wrote war poetry. After the war he served with the British Army on the Rhine (BAOR). He wrote articles for the BAOR newspaper Polar Bear News and became a writer and producer for the British Forces Network in Germany.

After demobilization, McKee became the editor of Conveyor magazine and wrote plays for BBC radio. Among many other subjects, his plays covered Trotsky's assassination, Dr Semmelweiss's campaign to get modern standards of hygiene adopted in hospitals across Europe, and the "mad" monk Rasputin's odd story and seemingly hypnotic influence on the Russian Imperial Family.

Next, McKee decided to concentrate on documentary authorship, publishing some 27 books during his life. In between researching and writing books, McKee took up sub-aqua diving with the Southsea Branch of the British Sub-Aqua Club. His projects got the branch voted the most interesting in the United Kingdom three years running. Next, he drove forward the discussed but unactioned project to search for King Henry VIII's flagship Mary Rose. From about 1965 onwards, he was concentrating most of his efforts on the Mary Rose project. For finding the Mary Rose, he was appointed an Officer of the Order of the British Empire.

McKee published King Henry VIII's Mary Rose in 1973. It was the first book about the Mary Rose project by nearly a decade, so it could be regarded as a seminal work. His vision already detailed most of what later became reality, even to the opening of the new Mary Rose Museum, and much of what he wrote is reiterated in publications by later authors.

In contrast, McKee's more frequently referenced book How We Found the Mary Rose was published as late as 1982, nearly a decade later. Although a human interest work, it includes many excerpts from the diving logs of his original diving teams from Project Solent Ships and MRSB0551: hence the "We" in the book title. He targeted these two books specifically on the Mary Rose. He also provides summaries of his Mary Rose research in some of his other books.

== Bibliography ==
- Against the Odds: Battles at Sea 1591–1949
- A Heritage of Ships
- A World Too Vast: The Four Voyages of Christopher Columbus
- Black Saturday
- Caen: Anvil of Victory (Last Round Against Rommel)
- Death Raft: the Wreck of the Medusa
- Dresden 1945: The Devil's Tinderbox, 1982
- El Alamein: Ultra and the Three Battles
- Farming the Sea
- From Merciless Invaders: An Eye-Witness Account of the Spanish Armada, 1963
- Gordon of Khartoum (published under the pseudonym Paul Charrier)
- History Under the Sea
- How We Found the Mary Rose, 1982
- H.M.S. Bounty
- Ice Crash
- Into the Blue (Great Mysteries of Aviation)
- King Henry VIII's Mary Rose, 1973
- Race for the Rhine Bridges
- Strike from the Sky
- Tarquin's Ship: the Etruscan Wreck in Campese Bay
- The Coal Scuttle Brigade
- The Friendless Sky (the Flying Aces: Sagas of the Incredible War in the Air 1914–1918)
- The Golden Wreck: The Tragedy of the "Royal Charter", 1961; 2nd ed. Souvenir Press,1986. ISBN 0-285-62745-7
- The Mosquito Log
- The Queen's Corsair
- Vimy Ridge
