= Harold Walker (cricketer) =

English cricketer

Personal information
- Full name: Harold Walker
- Born: 12 June 1918; Desborough, Northamptonshire, England
- Died: 12 November 2000 (aged 82); Kettering, Northamptonshire, England
- Batting: Right-handed
- Bowling: Right-arm medium

Domestic team information
- Years: Team
- 1947: Northamptonshire

Career statistics
Competition	First-class
Matches	1
Runs scored	8
Batting average	4.00
100s/50s	–/–
Top score	7
Balls bowled	–
Wickets	–
Bowling average	–
5 wickets in innings	–
10 wickets in match	–
Best bowling	–
Catches/stumpings	–/–
- Source: Cricinfo, 9 October 2011

Harold Walker (12 June 1918 – 12 November 2000) was an English cricketer. Walker was a right-handed batsman who bowled right-arm medium pace. He was born at Desborough, Northamptonshire.

Walker made his only first-class appearance for Northamptonshire against Essex in 1947. He opened the batting in this match, scoring a single run before being dismissed by Bill Dines, while in their second-innings he scored 7 runs, before being dismissed by the same bowler.

He died at Kettering, Northamptonshire on 12 November 2000.
