= Maurice Mounsdon =

British RAF pilot (1918–2019)

- Mounsdon during his military service
- Born: Maurice Hewlett Mounsdon; 11 February 1918; Lichfield, Staffordshire, England
- Died: 6 December 2019 (aged 101); Menorca, Balearic Islands, Spain
- Military career
- Allegiance: United Kingdom
- Branch: Royal Air Force
- Service years: 1939–1946
- Rank: Flight lieutenant
- Nickname: Mark
- Unit: No. 56 Squadron RAF
- Conflicts: Battle of Britain

Flight Lieutenant Maurice Hewlett Mounsdon (11 February 1918 – 6 December 2019) was a British pilot who flew with the Royal Air Force during World War II.

== Service in the RAF ==
Maurice "Mark" Mounsdon started training on 24 August 1939 and joined 56 Squadron on 3 June 1940 during the Battle of Britain. Flying a Hurricane, he participated in shooting down a Dornier Do 17 bomber on 3 July and was later credited with the probable destruction of a Junkers Ju 87 "Stuka". In mid-August he destroyed two Messerschmitt fighters and a likely third. He shot down or damaged about seven German aircraft before being downed by German fighters over Colchester on 31 August 1940. He survived but was badly burned and spent nine months in hospitals including Black Notley and the Queen Victoria Hospital – famous for its specialist work on burns and the Guinea Pig Club.

While recovering, he served at the HQ at RAF North Weald. After the reconstructive surgery was complete, he was still rated below A1B "fit full flying" and so was posted as an instructor at RAF Bottisham and then as a flight commander at RAF Booker. When the war ended, he was posted to 8303 Disarmament Wing, searching Germany for advanced weaponry such as jets and rockets. After demobilisation in 1946, he returned to the engineering profession which he had started at the General Electric Company, specialising in inventions and patents such as US 4029297 – "winches for use with high masts".

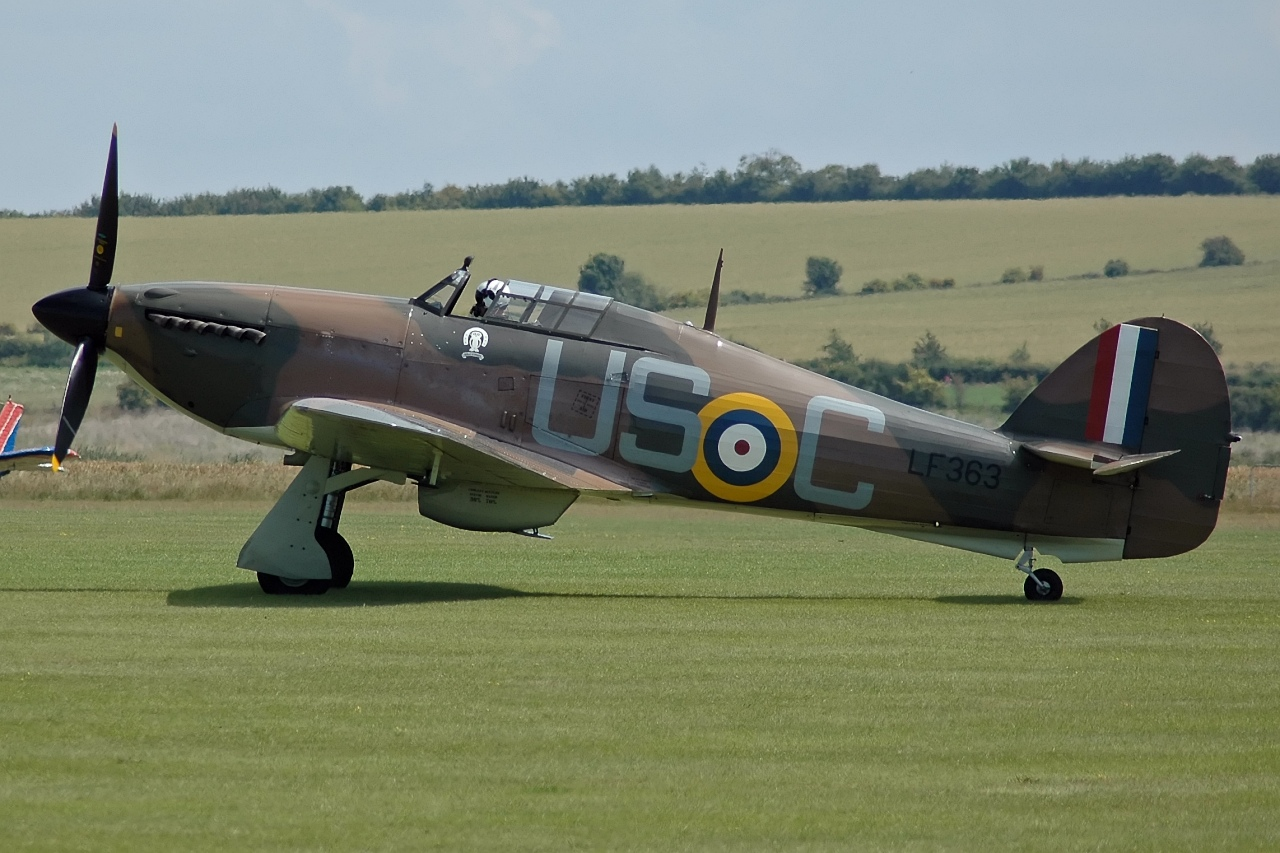
Hurricane LF363 of the Battle of Britain Memorial Flight with Mounsdon's markings in 2005.

== Life after the war ==
During his recuperation, Mounsdon married Mary, whom he had known since childhood, and in the 1970s they retired to Menorca. Mary died in 1993. In September 2018, for Mounsdon's 100th birthday, the Red Arrows made a flypast over the island in his honour. Mounsdon died on December 6, 2019 at the age of 101, at a nursing home on Menorca. The head of the RAF, Air Chief Marshal Michael Wigston, said that "[Mounsdon's] bravery and sacrifice should never be forgotten."

== See also ==
- List of RAF aircrew in the Battle of Britain
- The Few
