= Arthur Dimmock =

British writer, journalist and historian

Arthur F. Dimmock
- Born: Arthur Frederick Dimmock; 15 July 1918; Whitley Bay, England
- Died: 25 November 2007 (aged 89); Hayling Island, England
- Occupation(s): Author, journalist, historian

Arthur Frederick Dimmock MBE D.Arts (15 July 1918 – 25 November 2007) was an English writer, journalist and historian.

== Early life ==
Arthur Dimmock was born to Eleanor Dimmock on 15 July 1918, in Whitley Bay, Northumberland. He became deaf after a bout of meningitis during early childhood.

Eleanor Dimmock learned the manual alphabet to educate him at home. She had interpreted radio shows and his favourite football matches, which led to Dimmock becoming a voracious reader. This subsequently helped him acquire a command of English surpassing his hearing peers by the time he was seven. It had also allowed him to acquire a command of French and Latin. He never spoke English as he found it "irrelevant". He preferred finger-spelling as his means of communication.

In 1925, Dimmock enrolled at the Northern Counties School for the Deaf and Dumb in Newcastle. After he was offered a place to study fine arts at Durham University, he couldn't obtain funding and so, he became an apprentice cabinetmaker, specialising in the restoration of antique furniture, instead.

== Career ==
In 1938, he bought a one-way ticket to London and scraped a living from doing a variety of menial jobs, which includes selling coal, before he found skilled work as a cabinetmaker. He was then sent to a dock in Greenock to do essential war work. In 1942, Dimmock returned to London to pass his London Matriculation.

After the war ended, Dimmock became involved with deaf clubs in the London area by writing for The Review, a London-based deaf magazine, and sports as he was secretary to the Croydon Deaf Club. He was credited for establishing the Deaf travel industry, during the 1950s and 1960s, by customising international and European travel tours for British Deaf people as well as founding Deaf travel clubs in England.

He later wrote, and co-authored, a number of publications that helped to establish a body of notable works on British deaf history, journalism and non-fiction. He was also involved with the British Deaf History Society, founded in 1993, that researches and archives the written works of the historical, social and cultural background and achievements of Deaf people in literature, media and history; such as the works of Greek philosopher Plato whose work Dialogue included an essay on whether Deaf people were able to acquire intelligence through sign language. Dimmock's interest in deaf history had led him to establish a global network of historians, journalists and researchers, who shared local book and news cuttings of deaf people and deaf matters.

Dimmock had an active role in Deaf politics since young age. He was one of the founding members of the National Union of the Deaf (NUD), founded in March 1976, to campaign for the recognition and protection of Deaf people's rights, to promote sign language and to raise awareness of deaf issues. He became the chairman of the NUD during the 1980s. He was also an active promoter in Deaf sports, which involved him with CISS (Comité International des Sports des Sourds; the International Committee of Sports for the Deaf) and Deaflympics for more than twenty years.

From 1943 until 2006, Dimmock had an international news column "Girdle Around the Earth" in the British Deaf Times, which was later renamed the British Deaf News that has been a British Deaf Association publication since 1967.

In 2000, Dimmock was awarded an Honorary Doctorate of the Arts from University of Wolverhampton as a recognition of his journalism and works on Deaf matters. He was elected to the executive council of the British Deaf Association and at the 1992 Blackpool Congress, was awarded the BDA Gold Medal of Honour for his 50 years of service to the British deaf community.

He was awarded the MBE in 1995 for services to deaf people.

His life was the subject of a BBC documentary as part of BBC1's See Hear series, shown on 16 January, and repeated on 24 January, in 2008.

== Personal life ==
He married Jean Norman in 1943 and had one hearing daughter, Cassandra, who was born in 1948. His hobbies included swimming and mountaineering. Jean died in 2000 after 57 years of marriage. Dimmock later died on 25 November 2007, in Hayling Island, Hampshire.

The Memorial Service for the late Arthur F. Dimmock was held on 29 February 2008, at the Holy Trinity Church, Carlton Road, Redhill. Collection monies were split between the Woodford Foundation and the British Deaf History Society.

== Selected bibliography ==
- Tommy: A Biography of the Distinguished Deaf Royal Painter, A. R. Thomson, 1894–1979 (1992)
- Cruel Legacy: Introduction to the Record of Deaf People in History (1993)
- A. J. Wilson: Otherwise Faed, 1858–1945
- Mary Hare Grammar School Trivia
- Cochlear Implants: Two Personal Essays (1995)
- Sporting Heritage: A Record of the Activities of the Southern Deaf Sports Association Since the Founding Year of 1947
- Muted Passion: The Private and Public Career of a Deaf Optimist, the Autobiography of Arthur F. Dimmock (1995)
- Venerable Legacy: The Hand of Time, Saint Bede and the Anglo Celtic Contribution to Literary Numerical and Manual Language (1998)
- Sir Arthur Henderson Fairbairn, 1852–1915: Britain's Deaf and Dumb Baronet (2006)
