= Thomas Johnstone McWiggan =

British engineer

Thomas Johnstone McWiggan CBE FIEE FRAeS FIET

Director-General of Telecommunications, National Air Traffic Services
- In office 1969–1979

Personal details
- Born: 26 May 1918 Glasgow, Scotland
- Died: 2 February 2016 (aged 97)

Thomas Johnstone McWiggan (26 May 1918 – 2 January 2016) joined the Ministry of Civil Aviation in 1946, was involved in the introduction of Ground-Controlled Approach Radar (GCA) into civil aviation and was Director-General of Telecommunications at the Civil Aviation Authority (CAA) from 1970 to 1979.

== Early life ==
McWiggan was born on 26 May 1918 to Thomas and Esther McWiggan in Glasgow. His family moved to Gateshead in Northern England a few years after he was born. He attended the Secondary School, Gateshead which later became Gateshead Grammar School. He took an apprenticeship with Boots Cash Chemists (Northern) Ltd for four years from 1 October 1934. During this time he attended evening classes at the Rutherford Technical College, Newcastle. Boots awarded him a scholarship to attend the School of Pharmacy at University College Nottingham full-time from 1938 to 1939. When war broke out in 1939, his profession of Pharmaceutical Chemist prevented him from being conscripted into fighting in the army. He was in the 1945 Birthday Honours as an Acting Flight Lieutenant.

== Career ==
McWiggan joined the Ministry of Civil Aviation in 1946. From 1947 he held a succession of posts concerned with radar, navigational aids, communications development and engineering. He worked alongside Arthur C. Clarke on GCA radar, which was used in the Berlin Airlift of 1948–1949. In 1961 he was appointed Telecommunications member of the UK Mission to the Federal Aviation Administration in Washington, USA. He was Secretary-Treasurer of the 'IEEE Professional Technical Group on Aerospace and Navigational Electronics' while in Washington. In 1965 he became Director of Telecommunications (Plans), in 1967 Director of Telecommunications (Air Traffic Services) and in 1969 Chief of Telecommunications. He was made Director-General of Telecommunications at the Civil Aviation Authority (CAA) in 1970.

He was presented to Prince Philip during the Duke of Edinburgh's visit to the London Air Traffic Control Centre building, West Drayton on 11 July 1975. He was appointed a CBE for his services to Civil Aviation in 1976. In April 1978 he attended a meeting for the ICAO, a specialised agency of the United Nations, in Montreal. He was a strong advocate for the UK Doppler Microwave Landing System (DMLS) to be adopted worldwide instead of US-based TRSB,

National Air Traffic Services (NATS) held a farewell retirement dinner for McWiggan on 1 June 1979 at the Officers Mess at RAF Uxbridge. Following his retirement he held the post of Secretary General, European Organisation for Civil Aviation Electronics, until 1987. He was subsequently an aviation electronics consultant for many years after that. He published various technical papers and gave talks throughout his career.

== Personal life ==
After his marriage to Eileen in 1947 the couple settled in London and later Surrey. He lived with his family in Washington from 1962 to 1965 and then Addlestone until 2015. He died on 2 January 2016.
