= Paul Farnes =

British World War II flying ace

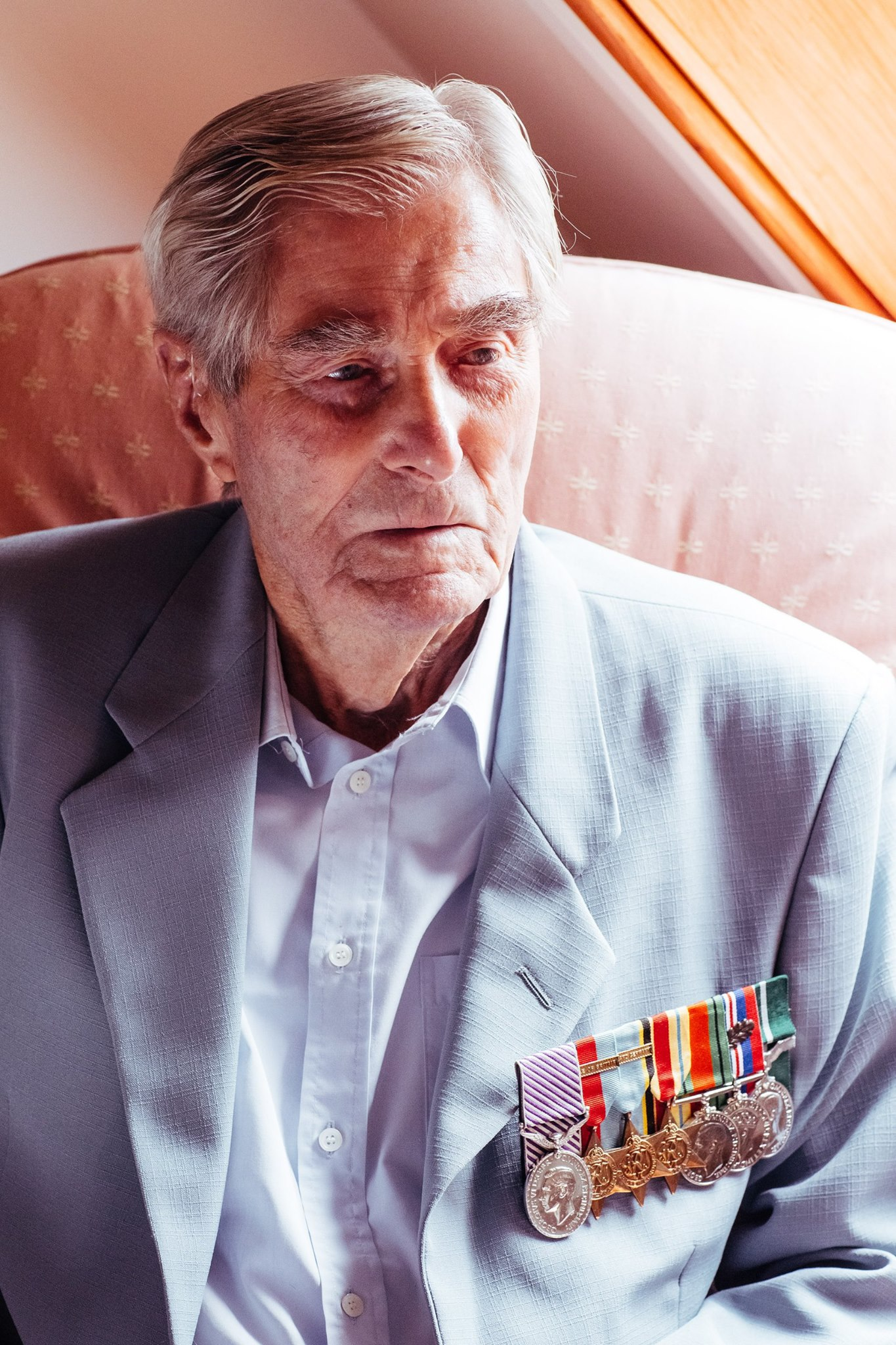
- Born: Paul Caswell Powe Farnes; 16 July 1918; Boscombe, Hampshire, England
- Died: 28 January 2020 (aged 101); Chichester, West Sussex, England
- Spouses: Pamela Barton (m. 1948; died 1989); Cynthia Farnes (m. 1994; died 2012)
- Children: 3
- Military career
- Allegiance: United Kingdom
- Branch: Royal Air Force
- Service years: 1938–1958
- Rank: Wing Commander
- Units: No. 501 Squadron RAF; No. 611 Squadron RAF
- Commands: No. 124 Squadron RAF; No. 229 Squadron RAF
- Conflicts: Second World War: Battle of France; Battle of Britain; North African Campaign
- Awards: Distinguished Flying Medal; Mentioned in Despatches; Air Efficiency Award

Paul Caswell Powe Farnes, DFM, AE (16 July 1918 – 28 January 2020) was a British Royal Air Force fighter pilot, and Second World War flying ace. He flew during the Battle of Britain as one of "The Few", piloting Hawker Hurricane and Supermarine Spitfire aircraft. He scored 8 kills (comprising 7 solo and 2 shared aircraft destroyed, 2 'probables', and 11 damaged).

== Early life ==
Paul Caswell Powe Farnes was born in Boscombe, Hampshire, on 16 July 1918. He was educated at Surbiton County School and Kingston Technical College, living near Walton-on-Thames, before joining the Royal Air Force Volunteer Reserve (RAFVR) in April 1938.

== Second World War ==
After completing his training, in the RAFVR, as a pilot he joined No. 501 Squadron RAF in September 1939 and remained with the squadron when it went to France in May 1940. He claimed his first victories during the Battle of France, with 'shares' in two bombers downed and a He 111 shot down solo. During August 1940 he claimed 5 more and in October 1940 he was awarded the Distinguished Flying Medal (DFM). By now a sergeant pilot, he was commissioned a pilot officer (on probation) on 3 December 1940.

In February 1941 Farnes was posted to No. 57 Operational Training Unit as an instructor. In November 1941 he transferred to No. 73 Operational Training Unit in Aden. He was confirmed in his rank and promoted to war-substantive flying officer on 3 December 1941. Farnes was posted to No. 229 Squadron RAF in North Africa as a flight commander in February 1942. He flew with the squadron on 27 March 1942 to Malta where he later took command of the squadron.

Farnes returned to North Africa in late May 1942. On 26 July 1942, he was promoted to war-substantive flight lieutenant. He was then posted to Iraq, where he joined the RAF headquarters staff and remained there until March 1945, receiving a promotion to war-substantive squadron leader on 1 May 1944. On return to the United Kingdom he took command of No. 124 Squadron RAF, a command he retained until the end of the war. He ended the war with the acting rank of wing commander.

== Later life ==
After the war, Farnes became a liaison officer for training centres with the Air Ministry. He was granted a permanent commission in the RAF in the rank of squadron leader on 1 September 1945. In 1948, he became a flying instructor. Farnes remained in the RAF until 1958, when he retired on 27 June with the rank of wing commander.

In 2010, Farnes said:

I'm very proud of having fought in the Battle of Britain, it is thought of as being a considerable achievement. Whether we like it or not, and the Navy do not, but if you talk sensibly about it people accept it as an iconic occurrence.

Farnes died on 28 January 2020 at the age of 101 in his home in West Sussex. He was the last ace fighter pilot of the Battle of Britain, leaving two surviving members of The Few.

== Personal life ==
Farnes's first wife was Pamela Barton who died in 1989. They married in Worthing, Sussex, in 1948. Farnes was married to Cynthia from 1994 until her death in 2012. He had a son, Jonathan, and a daughter, Linda; a second son, Nicholas, died in 1954.
