= 1926–27 Sheffield Shield season =

Australian cricket tournament

1926–27 Sheffield Shield
- Cricket format: First-class
- Tournament format: Double round-robin
- Champions: South Australia (4th title)
- Participants: 4
- Matches: 11
- Most runs: Bill Ponsford (Victoria) (1091)
- Most wickets: Don Blackie (Victoria) (33)

The 1926–27 Sheffield Shield season was the 31st season of the Sheffield Shield, the domestic first-class cricket competition of Australia. South Australia won the championship for the first time since the 1912–13 season. Queensland joined the Championship for the first time, and the method of deciding the title winners was based on average instead of points.

== Table ==
Team	Pld	W	L	D	Average%
South Australia	5	3	2	0	60
New South Wales	6	3	3	0	50
Victoria	6	3	3	0	50
Queensland	5	2	3	0	40

== Fixtures ==
26 November – 1 December 1926
Scorecard

New South Wales	v	Queensland (H)
280 (61.1 overs); Alan Kippax 127; Ron Oxenham 4/54 (20 overs)		356 (72.3 overs); Cecil Thompson 134; Norval Campbell 6/118 (17.3 overs)
475 (135.3 overs); Alan Kippax 131; Ron Oxenham 3/78 (30 overs)		391 (108 overs); Leo O'Connor 196; Norval Campbell 4/162 (33 overs)

New South Wales won by 8 runs
Brisbane Exhibition Ground, Brisbane
Umpires: Arthur Wyeth and John Scott

- New South Wales won the toss and elected to bat.

3–8 December 1926
Scorecard

Victoria	v	South Australia (H)
315 (71.7 overs); Bill Ponsford 214; Norman Williams 6/88 (20 overs)		481 (123.7 overs); Jack Rymill 142; Don Blackie 7/159 (51.7 overs)
430 (98.3 overs); Hunter Hendry 177; Norman Williams 6/146 (25 overs)		8/267 (83.2 overs); Vic Richardson 92; William Rayson 4/74 (17.2 overs)

South Australia won by 2 wickets
Adelaide Oval, Adelaide
Umpires: George Hele and J. J. Quinn

- Victoria won the toss and elected to bat.

6–11 December 1926
Scorecard

(H) New South Wales	v	Queensland
287 (76.3 overs); Charlie Macartney 114; Ron Oxenham 3/29 (9.4 overs)		577 (179.5 overs); Ron Oxenham 134*; Gordon Morgan 4/110 (32.5 overs)
588 (141.1 overs); Alan Kippax 182; Eric Bensted 3/68 (20.1 overs)		5/300 (84.3 overs); Leo O'Connor 143*; Ray McNamee 2/55 (23 overs)

Queensland won by 5 wickets
Sydney Cricket Ground, Sydney
Umpires: Alfred Williams and Walter French

- New South Wales won the toss and elected to bat.

17–22 December 1926
Scorecard

Queensland	v	Victoria (H)
147 (62 overs); Lynwood Gill 36; Don Blackie 4/49 (23 overs)		533 (129.6 overs); Bill Ponsford 151; Ron Oxenham 4/126 (29.6 overs)
217 (79.7 overs); Alexander Mayes 70; Frank Morton 4/67 (24 overs)

Victoria won by an innings and 169 runs
Melbourne Cricket Ground, Melbourne
Umpires: F. W. Dixon and P. E. Smith

- Queensland won the toss and elected to bat.

17–22 December 1926
Scorecard

(H) South Australia	v	New South Wales
500 (134.2 overs); Vic Richardson 157; Arthur Mailey 6/191 (51.2 overs)		341 (87.7 overs); Tommy Andrews 86; Norman Williams 5/155 (28 overs)
286 (99.3 overs); Colin Alexander 104; Ray McNamee 4/63 (30 overs)		6/446 (106 overs); Tommy Andrews 126; John Scott 2/108 (18 overs)

New South Wales won by 4 wickets
Adelaide Oval, Adelaide
Umpires: George Hele and J. J. Quinn

- South Australia won the toss and elected to bat.

24–29 December 1926
Scorecard

New South Wales	v	Victoria (H)
221 (81 overs); Norbert Phillips 52; Arthur Liddicut 4/50 (21 overs)		1107 (190.7 overs); Bill Ponsford 352; Arthur Mailey 4/362 (64 overs)
230 (51.3 overs); Archie Jackson 59*; Albert Hartkopf 6/98 (16.3 overs)

Victoria won by an innings and 656 runs
Melbourne Cricket Ground, Melbourne
Umpires: J. Stafford and Joseph Richards

- New South Wales won the toss and elected to bat.

25–28 December 1926
Scorecard

(H) South Australia	v	Queensland
579 (117.2 overs); Arthur Richardson 232; William Rowe 3/82 (20 overs)		251 (57.7 overs); Cecil Thompson 91; Norman Williams 3/66 (17 overs)
0/54 (6.3 overs); Vic Richardson 28*		379 f/o (87.5 overs); Cecil Thompson 77; Clarrie Grimmett 5/107 (24.5 overs)

South Australia won by 10 wickets
Adelaide Oval, Adelaide
Umpires: George Hele and J. J. Quinn

- South Australia won the toss and elected to bat.

1–6 January 1927
Scorecard

(H) Victoria	v	South Australia
304 (72.3 overs); Bill Ponsford 108; Clarrie Grimmett 4/101 (21.3 overs)		149 (52.3 overs); David Pritchard 56; Frank Morton 5/70 (24.3 overs)
649 (177.4 overs); Hammy Love 188; Clarrie Grimmett 5/180 (53 overs)		233 (74 overs); Karl Schneider 53; Frank Morton 4/70 (21 overs)

Victoria won by 571 runs
Melbourne Cricket Ground, Melbourne
Umpires: Joseph Richards and P. E. Smith

- Victoria won the toss and elected to bat.

8–12 January 1927
Scorecard

South Australia	v	New South Wales (H)
345 (87.7 overs); Arthur Richardson 189; Ernest O'Brien 5/99 (21.7 overs)		198 (45.4 overs); Les Gwynne 43; Douglas McKay 4/32 (11 overs)
399 (115.7 overs); Karl Schneider 146; Ray McNamee 5/86 (40 overs)		206 (43.2 overs); Archie Jackson 104*; Philip Lee 5/36 (7 overs)

South Australia won by 340 runs
Sydney Cricket Ground, Sydney
Umpires: Alfred Jones and Alfred Williams

- South Australia won the toss and elected to bat.

26–28 January 1927
Scorecard

(H) New South Wales	v	Victoria
469 (107 overs); Alan Kippax 217*; Don Blackie 3/126 (37 overs)		35 (18.4 overs); Bert Davie 10*; Ray McNamee 7/21 (8.4 overs)
		181 f/o (49.5 overs); Arthur Liddicut 55; Ray McNamee 3/49 (16 overs)

New South Wales won by an innings and 253 runs
Sydney Cricket Ground, Sydney
Umpires: M. Carney and William Bowes

- New South Wales won the toss and elected to bat.

5–11 February 1927
Scorecard

(H) Queensland	v	Victoria
399 (130 overs); Ron Oxenham 104; Frank Morton 4/130 (34 overs)		86 (34.6 overs); Keith Millar 34; Ron Oxenham 4/18 (11.6 overs)
439 (114.6 overs); Eric Knowles 144; Hunter Hendry 3/51 (15 overs)		518 (143.2 overs); Hunter Hendry 137; Percy Hornibrook 4/109 (32.2 overs)

Queensland won by 234 runs
Brisbane Exhibition Ground, Brisbane
Umpires: John Bartlett and John Scott

- Queensland won the toss and elected to bat.

== Statistics ==
=== Most Runs ===
Bill Ponsford 1091

=== Most Wickets ===
Don Blackie 33

== Notable events ==
Victoria recorded the highest innings total in first-class cricket history, when scoring 1,107 against New South Wales at Melbourne in December 1926. Incredibly, in the return match against New South Wales at Sydney in January 1927 they were dismissed for an innings total of just 35.
