= 1923–24 Sheffield Shield season =

Australian cricket tournament

1923–24 Sheffield Shield
- Cricket format: First-class
- Tournament format: Double round-robin
- Champions: Victoria (9th title)
- Participants: 3
- Matches: 6
- Most runs: Bill Ponsford (Victoria) (529)
- Most wickets: Albert Hartkopf (Victoria) (22)

The 1923–24 Sheffield Shield season was the 28th season of the Sheffield Shield, the domestic first-class cricket competition of Australia. Victoria won the championship.

== Table ==
Team	Pld	W	L	D	Pts
Victoria	4	4	0	0	4
New South Wales	4	2	2	0	0
South Australia	4	0	4	0	-4

== Fixtures ==
14–18 December 1923
Scorecard

New South Wales	v	South Australia (H)
98 (24.4 overs); John Scott 15*; Harry Heath 5/43 (12 overs)		116 (31.4 overs); Leonard Bowley 33; Charlie Kelleway 5/40 (16 overs)
333 (70.4 overs); Bert Oldfield 84; Richard Townsend 3/63 (20.4 overs)		145 (35.2 overs); Jack Rymill 44; Arthur Mailey 4/42 (9.2 overs)

New South Wales won by 170 runs
Adelaide Oval, Adelaide
Umpires: S. W. Smith and T. W. Cook

- South Australia won the toss and elected to field.

6 December 1923 – 1 January 1924
Scorecard

(H) Victoria	v	New South Wales
285 (88 overs); Edgar Mayne 106; John Scott 5/107 (29 overs)		268 (98.5 overs); Herbie Collins 108; Arthur Liddicut 4/50 (31 overs)
412 (145.2 overs); Bill Woodfull 117; Arthur Mailey 4/123 (45.2 overs)		386 (105.3 overs); Charlie Kelleway 98; Jack Ryder 4/81 (21 overs)

Victoria won by 43 runs
Melbourne Cricket Ground, Melbourne
Umpires: Bob Crockett and Clement Garing

- Victoria won the toss and elected to bat.

2–5 January 1924
Scorecard

(H) Victoria	v	South Australia
221 (61 overs); Bill Ponsford 81; Bill Whitty 5/49 (20 overs)		309 (75.5 overs); Arthur Richardson 144; Arthur Liddicut 6/65 (26 overs)
357 (82.3 overs); Bill Ponsford 159; Norman Williams 5/117 (18.3 overs)		171 (39.7 overs); David Pritchard 33; Albert Hartkopf 5/56 (12.7 overs)

Victoria won by 98 runs
Melbourne Cricket Ground, Melbourne
Umpires: A. D. Reaburn and Dave Elder

- Victoria won the toss and elected to bat.

11–14 January 1924
Scorecard

South Australia	v	New South Wales (H)
383 (74.4 overs); Vic Richardson 135; Arthur Mailey 7/133 (25.4 overs)		684 (121.4 overs); Alan Kippax 248; Norman Williams 4/196 (24.4 overs)
197 (49 overs); Vic Richardson 67; Sam Everett 6/54 (14 overs)

New South Wales won by an innings and 104 runs
Sydney Cricket Ground, Sydney
Umpires: A. H. Farrow and Alfred Jones

- South Australia won the toss and elected to bat.

26–30 January 1924
Scorecard

(H) New South Wales	v	Victoria
217 (62.2 overs); Tommy Andrews 96; Albert Hartkopf 4/49 (14.2 overs)		345 (129.7 overs); Edgar Mayne 154*; Charlie Macartney 3/36 (29.7 overs)
321 (87.4 overs); Herbie Collins 81; Percival Wallace 5/99 (27 overs)		2/195 (59.2 overs); Bill Ponsford 110*; Hunter Hendry 1/35 (13 overs)

Victoria won by 8 wickets
Sydney Cricket Ground, Sydney
Umpires: Alfred Jones and Alfred Williams

- Victoria won the toss and elected to field.

15–20 February 1924
Scorecard

Victoria	v	South Australia (H)
454 (96.1 overs); Albert Hartkopf 99; Edmund Wainwright 3/52 (16 overs)		191 (53 overs); David Pritchard 73*; Leslie Keating 6/72 (16 overs)
		256 f/o (63.1 overs); Jack Murray 91; Clarrie Grimmett 8/86 (19.1 overs)

Victoria won by an innings and 7 runs
Adelaide Oval, Adelaide
Umpires: F. K. Lindow and S. W. Smith

- South Australia won the toss and elected to field.

== Statistics ==
=== Most Runs ===
Bill Ponsford 529

=== Most Wickets ===
Albert Hartkopf 22
