= 1925–26 Sheffield Shield season =

Australian cricket tournament

1925–26 Sheffield Shield
- Cricket format: First-class
- Tournament format: Double round-robin
- Champions: New South Wales (17th title)
- Participants: 3
- Matches: 6
- Most runs: Bill Woodfull (Victoria) (597)
- Most wickets: John Scott (South Australia) (22)

The 1925–26 Sheffield Shield season was the 30th season of the Sheffield Shield, the domestic first-class cricket competition of Australia. New South Wales won the championship.

== Table ==
| Team | Pld | W | L | D | Pts |
|---|---|---|---|---|---|
| New South Wales | 4 | 4 | 0 | 0 | 4 |
| Victoria | 4 | 1 | 3 | 0 | -2 |
| South Australia | 4 | 1 | 3 | 0 | -2 |

== Fixtures ==
13–18 November 1925
Scorecard

| (H) South Australia | v | Victoria |
| 170 (44.5 overs); Jack Rymill 39; Don Blackie 7/71 (22 overs) | | 275 (64.7 overs); Hammy Love 63; Clarrie Grimmett 5/95 (26 overs) |
| 410 (114.3 overs); David Pritchard 69; Hunter Hendry 5/99 (27.3 overs) | | 182 (51.6 overs); Hunter Hendry 65*; John Scott 6/58 (14.6 overs) |

South Australia won by 123 runs
Adelaide Oval, Adelaide
Umpires: R. B. Pounsett and T. W. Cook

- South Australia won the toss and elected to bat.

18–22 December 1925
Scorecard

| (H) South Australia | v | New South Wales |
| 185 (63.3 overs); Vic Richardson 59; Arthur Mailey 6/79 (24.3 overs) | | 554 (111.7 overs); Charlie Macartney 112; John Scott 5/117 (19.7 overs) |
| 270 (75.1 overs); Vic Richardson 61; Jack Gregory 4/75 (22 overs) |

New South Wales won by an innings and 99 runs
Adelaide Oval, Adelaide
Umpires: R. B. Pounsett and S. W. Smith

- South Australia won the toss and elected to bat.

26–31 December 1925
Scorecard

| (H) Victoria | v | New South Wales |
| 413 (128.5 overs); Hammy Love 115; Charlie Macartney 7/85 (37 overs) | | 705 (177.6 overs); Charlie Kelleway 145; Don Blackie 4/153 (38.6 overs) |
| 130 (33 overs); Fred Baring 30; Charlie Kelleway 3/12 (6 overs) |

New South Wales won by an innings and 162 runs
Melbourne Cricket Ground, Melbourne
Umpires: Clement Garing and Dave Elder

- Victoria won the toss and elected to bat.

1–9 January 1926
Scorecard

| (H) Victoria | v | South Australia |
| 232 (67.1 overs); Bill Woodfull 97; Arthur Richardson 3/40 (11 overs) | | 462 (106.4 overs); Colin Alexander 133; Don Blackie 3/132 (35 overs) |
| 604 (154.5 overs); Bill Woodfull 236; John Scott 3/152 (35 overs) | | 87 (26.4 overs); Vic Richardson 27; Hunter Hendry 6/30 (12.4 overs) |

Victoria won by 287 runs
Melbourne Cricket Ground, Melbourne
Umpires: F. W. Dixon and P. E. Smith

- Victoria won the toss and elected to bat.

11–16 January 1926
Scorecard

| (H) New South Wales | v | South Australia |
| 642 (154.1 overs); Warren Bardsley 159; Clarrie Grimmett 4/192 (51 overs) | | 475 (99.1 overs); Arthur Richardson 153; Tommy Andrews 3/34 (4.1 overs) |
| 593 (147 overs); Charlie Macartney 113; Clarrie Grimmett 6/202 (55 overs) | | 219 (49.1 overs); Percy Rundell 52; Arthur Mailey 4/96 (22 overs) |

New South Wales won by 541 runs
Sydney Cricket Ground, Sydney
Umpires: Alfred Jones and E. R. Kent

- New South Wales won the toss and elected to bat.

23–27 January 1926
Scorecard

| Victoria | v | New South Wales (H) |
| 290 (82.3 overs); Bill Ponsford 79; Sam Everett 4/57 (15 overs) | | 708 (156.5 overs); Alan Kippax 271*; Hunter Hendry 3/122 (30.5 overs) |
| 322 (66.6 overs); Bill Ponsford 138; Sam Everett 5/91 (16.6 overs) |

New South Wales won by an innings and 96 runs
Sydney Cricket Ground, Sydney
Umpires: Alfred Williams and M. Carney

- Victoria won the toss and elected to bat.

== Statistics ==
=== Most Runs ===
Bill Woodfull 597

=== Most Wickets ===
John Scott 22

== Notable events ==
New South Wales recorded crushing victories in all four matches - winning three by an innings and the fourth by over 500 runs, scoring 554, 705, 642, 593 and 708 in their innings.
