= English cricket team in Australia in 1924–25 =

International cricket tour

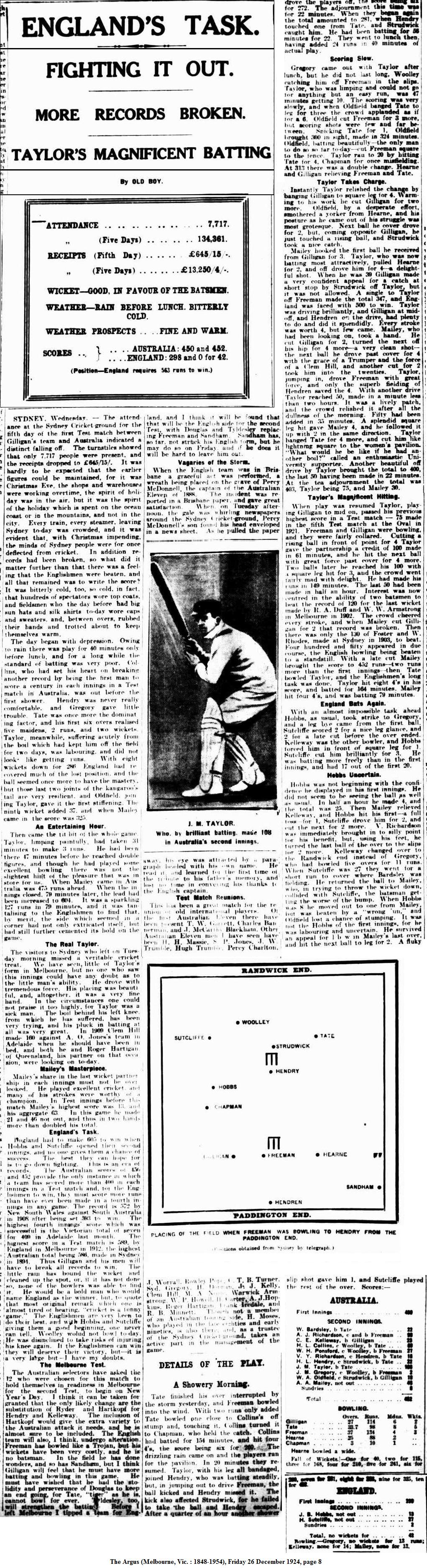
Newspaper article describing batting on the fifth day of the first Ashes test, with Taylor's 108 in the record 10th wicket partnership.

Marylebone Cricket Club organised the England cricket team's tour of Australia in the 1924–25 season. Australia won the Ashes series 4–1.

== Overview ==
The series was the first Test series to be hosted in Australia for four years, with Australia holding the Ashes courtesy of their 3–0 victory away during the 1921 Ashes series. The tourists were led by Arthur Gilligan, a Cambridge-educated man from a wealthy family, while the Australian captain was Herbie Collins, a compulsive gambler who had been known to run card games and spend time in Monte Carlo during the 1921 tour. On the field, six Australians made their Test debuts, including Clarrie Grimmett, Bill Ponsford and future Australian captain Vic Richardson. Australia won the series 4–1 and were considered the better team overall, although they won the 3rd test only narrowly, by just 11 runs. Herbert Sutcliffe was considered the best batter of the series despite his team's losing effort, scoring 734 runs at an average of 81.55, including four centuries.

== Test series summary ==
=== First Test ===
19–27 December 1924
(Timeless Test)
Scorecard

Australia	v	England
450 (152.2 overs); HL Collins 114; MW Tate 6/130 (55.1 overs)		298 (79.7 overs); JB Hobbs 115; JM Gregory 5/111 (28.7 overs)
452 (125.7 overs); JM Taylor 108; MW Tate 5/98 (33.7 overs)		411 (96.7 overs); FE Woolley 123; HSTL Hendry 3/36 (10.7 overs)

Australia won by 193 runs
Sydney Cricket Ground, Sydney
Umpires: AC Jones and AP Williams

- Australia won the toss and elected to bat.
- 21 and 25 December were taken as rest days.
- WH Ponsford, AJ Richardson and VY Richardson (AUS), and AP Freeman (ENG) made their Test debuts.

The first Test included a record 127-run tenth-wicket partnership between Johnny Taylor and Arthur Mailey, which stood as Australia's best for that wicket until Phillip Hughes and Ashton Agar set a new world record by scoring 163 against England in the First Test at Trent Bridge in July 2013.

=== Second Test ===
1–8 January 1925
(Timeless Test)
Scorecard

Australia	v	England
600 (149.5 overs); VY Richardson 138; AER Gilligan 3/114 (26 overs)		479 (138 overs); H Sutcliffe 176; JM Gregory 3/124 (34 overs)
250 (79.3 overs); JM Taylor 90; MW Tate 6/99 (33.3 overs)		290 (106.3 overs); H Sutcliffe 127; AA Mailey 5/92 (24 overs)

Australia won by 81 runs
Melbourne Cricket Ground, Melbourne
Umpires: RM Crockett and C Garing

- Australia won the toss and elected to bat.
- 4 January was taken as a rest day
- AEV Hartkopf (AUS) made his Test debut.

=== Third Test ===
16–23 January 1925
(Timeless Test)
Scorecard

Australia	v	England
489 (153 overs); J Ryder 201*; R Kilner 4/127 (56 overs)		365 (117.2 overs); JB Hobbs 119; JM Gregory 3/111 (26.2 overs)
250 (68.1 overs); J Ryder 88; R Kilner 4/51 (22.1 overs)		363 (111.2 overs); WW Whysall 75; C Kelleway 3/57 (22 overs)

Australia won by 11 runs
Adelaide Oval, Adelaide
Umpires: RM Crockett and DA Elder

- Australia won the toss and elected to bat.
- 18 January was taken as a rest day
- WW Whysall (ENG) made his Test debut.

=== Fourth Test ===
13–18 February 1925
(Timeless Test)
Scorecard

England	v	Australia
548 (151.6 overs); H Sutcliffe 143; AA Mailey 4/186 (43.6 overs)		269 (63.3 overs); JM Taylor 86; R Kilner 3/29 (13 overs)
		250 (f/o) (74.5 overs); JM Taylor 68; MW Tate 5/75 (25.5 overs)

England won by an innings and 29 runs
Melbourne Cricket Ground, Melbourne
Umpires: RM Crockett and DA Elder

- England won the toss and elected to bat.
- 15 February was taken as a rest day.

=== Fifth Test ===
27 February–4 March 1925
(Timeless Test)
Scorecard

Australia	v	England
295 (102.5 overs); WH Ponsford 80; MW Tate 4/92 (39.5 overs)		167 (47.7 overs); FE Woolley 47; CV Grimmett 5/45 (11.7 overs)
325 (118.3 overs); TJE Andrews 80; MW Tate 5/115 (39.3 overs)		146 (44.4 overs); MW Tate 33; CV Grimmett 6/37 (19.4 overs)

Australia won by 307 runs
Sydney Cricket Ground, Sydney
Umpires: RM Crockett and DA Elder

- Australia won the toss and elected to bat.
- 1 March was taken as a rest day
- AF Kippax and CV Grimmett (both AUS) made their Test debuts.

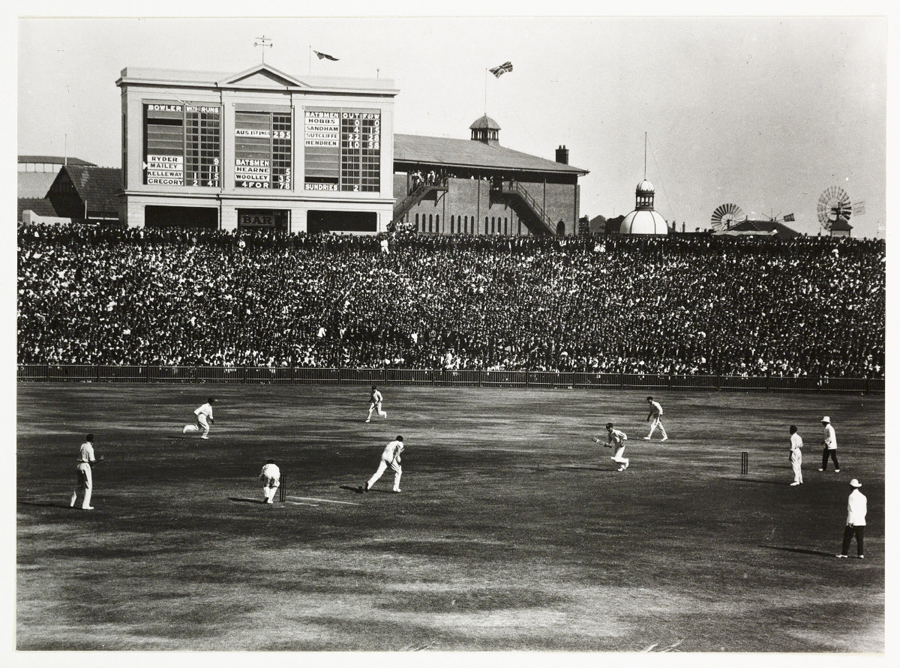
JW Hearne and FE Woolley batting, at 4–78 in England's first innings of the Fifth Test at Sydney, chasing Australia's 295 all out.

== Ceylon ==
The English team had a stopover in Colombo en route to Australia and played a one-day single-innings match there against the Ceylon national team, which at that time did not have Test status.

== Controversies ==
Off the field, English captain Gilligan was investigated by the Commonwealth Investigative Branch due to his fascist links, as an active member of the British Fascists. Gilligan attempted to recruit for the organisation and establish branches throughout the country, although no negative outcomes occurred for Gilligan.

The third test was controversial, as Australian captain Collins well known for his gambling, was reported to have been offered £100 to throw the match. Despite his denials, including vowing to "throw the man downstairs". Collin's bowling choices on the final day were questioned as Australia only won by 11 runs.
