= English cricket team in Australia in 1928–29 =

International cricket tour

- Date: 18 October 1928 — 23 March 1929
- Location: Australia
- Result: England won the 5-Test series 4-1
Teams
- Australia: England
Captains
- J Ryder: APF Chapman
Most runs
- WM Woodfull (511) J Ryder (492) DG Bradman (468): WR Hammond (905); EH Hendren (472); JB Hobbs (451)
Most wickets
- CV Grimmett (23) DD Blackie (14): JC White (25); G Geary (19); H Larwood (18); MW Tate (17)

The England cricket team toured Australia in 1928–29. England, known as the MCC in matches outside the Tests, retained The Ashes, winning the first four Tests and losing the last for a 4–1 series victory.

Writing in the 1930 Wisden, SJ Southerton wrote:

England were stronger in batting, more reliable and consistent in bowling and very definitely superior in fielding.

The series was defined by the prodigious runscoring of Wally Hammond, playing his maiden Ashes series, who with a run of scores of 251 at Sydney, 200 and 32 at Melbourne, and 119 not out and 177 at Adelaide, scored a then-record series aggregate of 905 runs at an average of 113.12; the record has only been surpassed once, by Donald Bradman in the 1930 Ashes. In the fifth Test, England's Jack Hobbs became the oldest player to score a Test century, at the age of 46 years and 82 days, a record that still stands.

== The MCC team ==
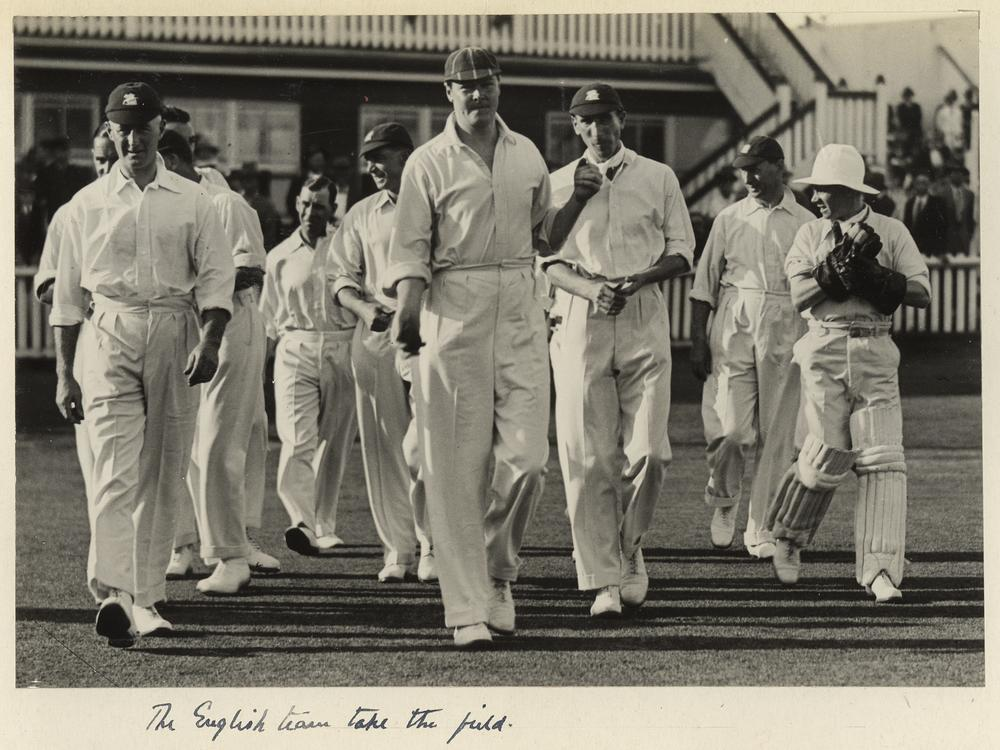
Percy Chapman leads out his powerful 1928–29 England team out onto the field

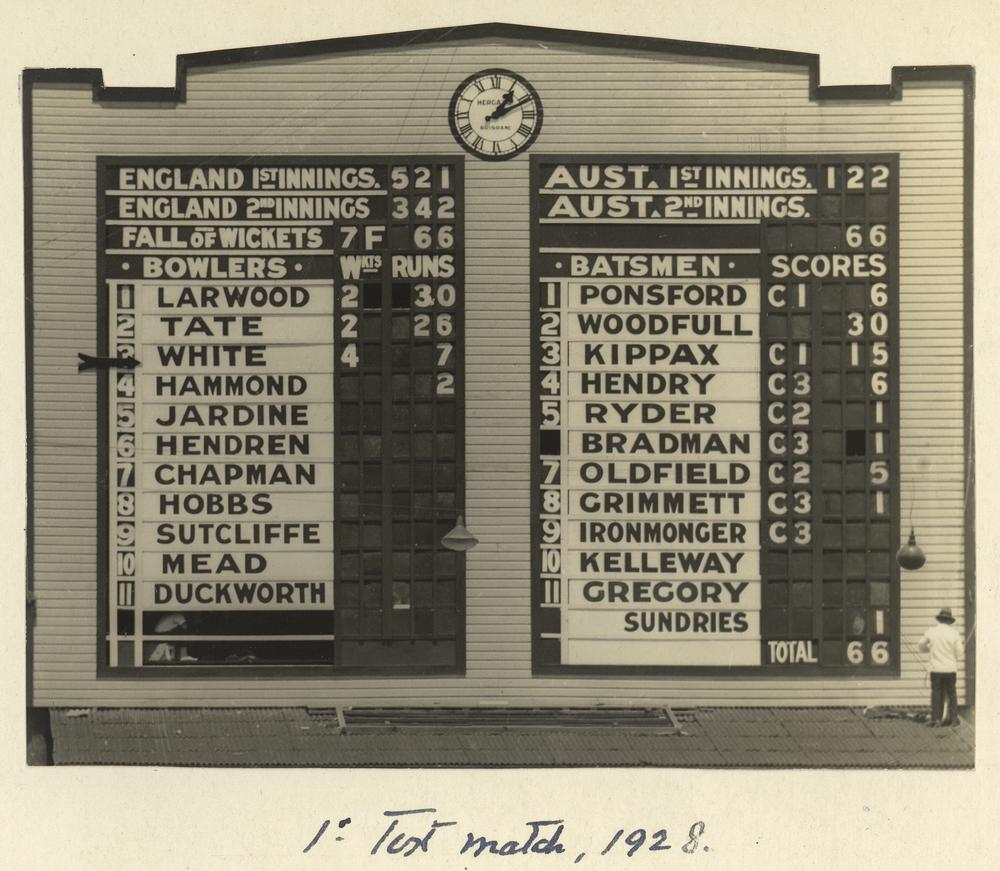
Scoreboard from the First Test.

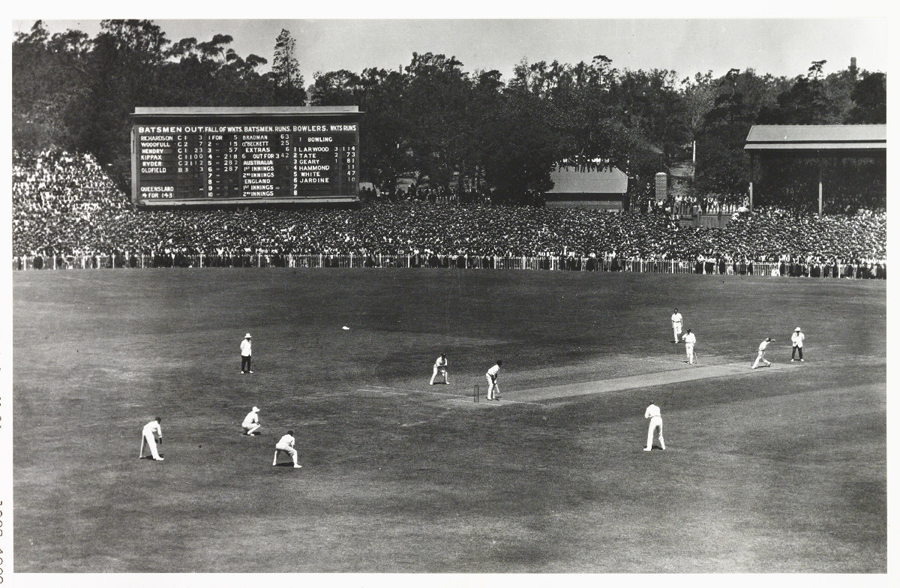
Larwood bowling to Beckett at 6–342 in Australia's first innings in the Third Test at Melbourne.

The MCC touring party was:

- Percy Chapman (Kent) (captain)
- Jack White (Somerset) (vice-captain)
- Douglas Jardine (Surrey)
- Jack Hobbs (Surrey)
- Herbert Sutcliffe (Yorkshire)
- Wally Hammond (Gloucestershire)
- Patsy Hendren (Middlesex)
- Ernest Tyldesley (Lancashire)
- Phil Mead (Hampshire)
- Maurice Leyland (Yorkshire)
- Maurice Tate (Sussex)
- George Geary (Leicestershire)
- George Duckworth (Lancashire) (wicketkeeper)
- Les Ames (Kent) (wicketkeeper)
- Harold Larwood (Nottinghamshire)
- "Tich" Freeman (Kent)
- Sam Staples (Nottinghamshire)

== Tests ==
=== First Test ===
30 November – 5 December 1928
(Timeless Test)
Scorecard

England	v	Australia
521 (175.3 overs); EH Hendren 169 (314); H Larwood 70 (132); JM Gregory 3/142 (42 overs); CV Grimmett 3/167 (40 overs)		122 (50.4 overs); J Ryder 33; H Larwood 6/32 (14.4 overs)
8/342 (dec) (135.1 overs); CP Mead 73 (263); DR Jardine 65* (194); CV Grimmett 6/131 (44.1 overs)		66 (25.3 overs); WM Woodfull 30 (73); JC White 4/7 (6.3 overs)

England won by 675 runs
Brisbane Exhibition Ground, Brisbane, Australia
Umpires: DA Elder (Aus) and GA Hele (Aus)

- 2 December was taken as a rest day.

=== Second Test ===
14–20 December 1928
(Timeless Test)
Scorecard

Australia	v	England
253 (108.2 overs); WM Woodfull 68 (216); G Geary 5/35 (18 overs)		636 (272.1 overs); WR Hammond 251 (605); DD Blackie 4/148 (59 overs)
397 (151.4 overs); HSTL Hendry 112 (305); WM Woodfull 111 (286); MW Tate 4/99 (46 overs)		2/16 (7 overs); G Geary 8 (21); HSTL Hendry 2/4 (3 overs)

England won by eight wickets
Sydney Cricket Ground, Sydney, Australia
Umpires: DA Elder (Aus) and GA Hele (Aus)

- 16 December was taken as a rest day.

=== Third Test ===
29 December 1928 – 5 January 1929
(Timeless Test)
Scorecard

Australia	v	England
397 (180.5 overs); J Ryder 112 (219); AL Kippax 100 (255); G Geary 3/83 (31.5 overs); H Larwood 3/127 (37 overs)		417 (195 overs); WR Hammond 200 (472); DD Blackie 6/94 (44 overs)
351 (165.5 overs); DG Bradman 112 (281); WM Woodfull 107 (309); JC White 5/107 (56.5 overs)		7/332 (159.5 overs); H Sutcliffe 135 (462); CV Grimmett 2/96 (42 overs)

England won by three wickets
Melbourne Cricket Ground, Melbourne, Australia
Umpires: DA Elder (Aus) and GA Hele (Aus)

- 30 December was taken as a rest day.
- This Test match still holds the record for the highest match aggregate (1497) without a no-ball extra.

=== Fourth Test ===
1–8 February 1929
(Timeless Test)
Scorecard

England	v	Australia
334 (183.1 overs); WR Hammond 119* (374); CV Grimmett 5/102 (52.1 overs)		369 (160 overs); A Jackson 164 (331); JC White 5/130 (60 overs); MW Tate 4/77 (42 overs)
383 (200.4 overs); WR Hammond 177 (603); DR Jardine 98 (378); RK Oxenham 4/67 (47.4 overs)		336 (151.5 overs); J Ryder 87 (155); JC White 8/126 (64.5 overs)

England won by 12 runs
Adelaide Oval, Adelaide, Australia
Umpires: DA Elder (Aus) and GA Hele (Aus)

- 3 February was taken as a rest day.

=== Fifth Test ===
8–16 March 1929
(Timeless Test)
Scorecard

England	v	Australia
519 (215.1 overs); JB Hobbs 142 (301); M Leyland 137 (330); TW Wall 3/123 (49 overs); PM Hornibrook 3/142 (48 overs)		491 (271.3 overs); DG Bradman 123 (247); WM Woodfull 102 (381); G Geary 5/105 (81 overs)
257 (86.3 overs); JB Hobbs 65 (126); MW Tate 54 (57); M Leyland 53 (138); TW Wall 5/66 (26 overs)		5/287 (134.1 overs); J Ryder 57 (172); WAS Oldfield 48 (156); A Jackson 46 (75); WR Hammond 3/53 (26 overs)

Australia won by five wickets
Melbourne Cricket Ground, Melbourne, Australia
Umpires: GA Hele (Aus) and AC Jones (Aus)

- 10 March was taken as a rest day.

== Ceylon ==
The English team had a stopover in Colombo en route to Australia and played a one-day single-innings match there against the Ceylon national team, which at that time did not have Test status.
