= 1912–13 Sheffield Shield season =

Australian cricket tournament

1912–13 Sheffield Shield
- Cricket format: First-class
- Tournament format: Double round-robin
- Champions: South Australia (3rd title)
- Participants: 3
- Matches: 6
- Most runs: Edgar Mayne (South Australia) – 476 runs
- Most wickets: Bill Whitty (South Australia) – 25 wickets

The 1912–13 Sheffield Shield season was the 21st season of the Sheffield Shield, the domestic first-class cricket competition of Australia. South Australia won the championship.

== Table ==
Team	Pld	W	L	D	Pts
South Australia	4	3	1	0	2
New South Wales	4	2	2	0	0
Victoria	4	1	3	0	-2

== Fixtures ==
20–23 December 1912
Scorecard

(H) South Australia	v	New South Wales
569 (141.3 overs); Edgar Mayne 124; Roy Minnett 2/77 (24 overs)		276 (89 overs); Herbie Collins 79; Percy Rundell 3/34 (10 overs)
		240 f/o (64 overs); Bert Folkard 61; Bill Whitty 4/37 (15 overs)

South Australia won by an innings and 53 runs
Adelaide Oval, Adelaide
Umpires: A. T. Haddrick and F. J. C. Thomas

- South Australia won the toss and elected to bat.

26–28 December 1912
Scorecard

New South Wales	v	Victoria (H)
84 (47.1 overs); Victor Trumper 25; Jimmy Matthews 5/25 (16.1 overs)		181 (46.3 overs); Hughie Carroll 73; Sid Emery 4/48 (12.3 overs)
232 (65.4 overs); Charles Barnes 53; Jack Ryder 6/44 (19.4 overs)		4/137 (43.4 overs); Fred Baring 42; Roy Minnett 3/40 (15 overs)

Victoria won by 6 wickets
Melbourne Cricket Ground, Melbourne
Umpires: Bob Crockett and Dave Elder

- Victoria won the toss and elected to field.

1–3 January 1913
Scorecard

South Australia	v	Victoria (H)
309 (90 overs); Jack Crawford 83; Jack Ryder 6/102 (28 overs)		229 (78 overs); Hughie Carroll 55; Leonard Chamberlain 3/36 (16 overs)
128 (38.1 overs); Edgar Mayne 52; Jack Ryder 7/53 (19 overs)		140 (36.4 overs); Fred Baring 76; Bill Whitty 5/65 (16 overs)

South Australia won by 68 runs
Melbourne Cricket Ground, Melbourne
Umpires: Bob Crockett and W. A. Young

- South Australia won the toss and elected to bat.

10–14 January 1913
Scorecard

(H) New South Wales	v	South Australia
513 (129.2 overs); Victor Trumper 201*; Jack Crawford 3/124 (30 overs)		331 (79.5 overs); Clem Hill 138; Jack Massie 3/74 (21.5 overs)
314 (83.2 overs); Charlie Macartney 96; Bill Whitty 5/92 (28.2 overs)		412 (102.3 overs); Johnny Moyes 95; Jack Massie 3/62 (27 overs)

New South Wales won by 84 runs
Sydney Cricket Ground, Sydney
Umpires: Alfred Jones and William Curran

- New South Wales won the toss and elected to bat.

24–28 January 1913
Scorecard

Victoria	v	New South Wales (H)
274 (80 overs); Warwick Armstrong 118*; H. V. Hordern 4/69 (22 overs)		477 (117 overs); Eric Barbour 146; William Cannon 6/107 (23 overs)
365 (104.5 overs); Jimmy Matthews 81; Jack Massie 7/110 (31 overs)		2/163 (36 overs); Charlie Macartney 76*; Jack Ryder 1/47 (14 overs)

New South Wales won by 8 wickets
Sydney Cricket Ground, Sydney
Umpires: Alfred Jones and William Curran

- Victoria won the toss and elected to bat.

28 February – 4 March 1913
Scorecard

(H) South Australia	v	Victoria
368 (111.2 overs); Jack Crawford 163; Jimmy Matthews 4/111 (40 overs)		209 (68.5 overs); Warwick Armstrong 72; Jack Crawford 8/66 (22.5 overs)
222 (73.2 overs); Edgar Mayne 106; Warwick Armstrong 4/70 (29 overs)		215 (73.4 overs); Jimmy Matthews 56; Bill Whitty 4/30 (23.4 overs)

South Australia won by 166 runs
Adelaide Oval, Adelaide
Umpires: A. McIntyre and F. J. C. Thomas

- South Australia won the toss and elected to bat.

== Statistics ==
=== Most Runs ===
Edgar Mayne 476

=== Most Wickets ===
Bill Whitty 25
