= George Hele =

Australian rules footballer, born 1891

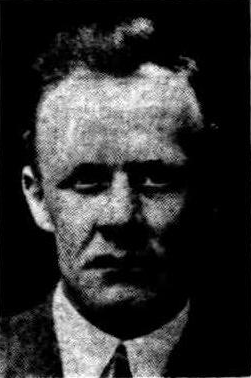

Personal information
- Full name: George Alfred Hele
- Born: 16 July 1891; Adelaide, South Australia
- Died: 28 August 1982 (aged 91); Preston, Victoria, Australia

Umpiring information
- Tests umpired: 16 (1928–1933)
- FC umpired: 56 (1921–1934)
- Source: CricketArchive, 2 November 2012

George Alfred Hele (16 July 1891 – 28 August 1982) was an Australian cricket umpire who umpired 16 Test matches between 1928 and 1933. He was most famous for his role in the infamous Bodyline series, played between Australia and England during the latter team's 1932–33 tour of Australia. From Adelaide, South Australia, Hele played club cricket, but retired at an early age after an injury. He also played Australian rules football for the West Torrens Football Club in the South Australian Football League (SAFL). He took up umpiring at club level in 1918, and progressed to first-class level shortly after, debuting as an umpire during the 1920–21 Australian cricket season. As South Australia's primary umpire, Hele served in almost every first-class match in the state during the 1920s, both in Sheffield Shield matches involving the South Australian cricket team and in state matches against touring international sides.

Hele made his Test umpiring debut in November 1928, during England's 1928–29 tour of Australia. He umpired in all five matches during the series, becoming the first person to do so. Subsequently, officiating in Australian series against South Africa and the West Indies, Hele was perhaps best known for his role in the Bodyline series, umpiring all five Tests during the controversial series. Although maintaining his neutrality throughout the series, he later said he had been "horrified" at the intimidatory bowling tactics utilised by England's captain, Douglas Jardine, and had "never seen more vicious bowling". Hele later moved to Victoria, and officiated his last first-class match in early 1935. Throughout his life, he had been an avid collector of cricket memorabilia and writing, including souvenirs personally received from players he had umpired. During his umpiring career, he was also said to have possessed "one of the finest cricket libraries in Australia".

== Early life ==
Hele was born on 16 July 1891 to Elizabeth Ann (née Patterson) and Andrew William Hele, in an inner suburb of Adelaide. (Note: The exact suburb in which Hele was born is uncertain. The Australian Dictionary of Biography suggests Hele was born in Hindmarsh, whereas both Cricinfo and CricketArchive, two leading cricket statistics websites, suggest Hele was born in Brompton, to the north of Hindmarsh.) He was named after George Giffen, who was one of Australia's leading cricketers of the late 19th century. His father had been a keen participant in both football and cricket, and kept wicket for the Bowden Cricket Club in the Adelaide and Suburban Cricket Association. He also served as an umpire, umpiring first-class games between South Australia and Victoria during both the 1913–14 and 1914–15 seasons. Hele left school at the age of 13, and took up work in a factory manufacturing soft drinks. Like his father, he played as a wicket-keeper, keeping wicket for the Brompton Methodists, and later for the West Torrens Cricket Club in the higher-level SACA District competition. However, his playing career was short, as he was forced to retire due to a persistent injury. Like his father, Hele was also a keen footballer, and played senior matches for the West Torrens Football Club in the South Australian Football League (SAFL) during the period surrounding World War I. His brother, Robert Roy Hele, also played for West Torrens, and was later a SANFL commissioner.

== Umpiring career ==
Following his father into umpiring, Hele umpired his first district cricket match in 1918, a B-grade game at the Adelaide Oval. He was unable to umpire the following season due to work commitments, but began umpiring regularly the following season, becoming one of Adelaide's leading club cricket umpires. Hele was selected to make his first-class umpiring debut in a match towards the end of the 1920–21 Australian season, between South Australia and a touring English side, captained by Johnny Douglas. The match, beginning on 11 March 1921, lasted four days, and was won by Douglas' side by an innings and 63 runs, with Wilfred Rhodes and C. A. G. Russell both recording double centuries in an innings total of 627. Hele umpired his first Sheffield Shield game the following season, a five-day game between South Australia and New South Wales, and would umpire regularly for the rest of the 1920s, becoming the South Australian Cricket Association's first-choice umpire by the middle of the decade. (Note: Up until the last decades of the 20th century, umpires for Sheffield Shield matches were selected by the cricket association of the state in which the game was played. Umpires thus rarely officiated outside of their home states. Hele's first match as umpire outside South Australia only occurred when he made his Test debut in Brisbane in 1928 – his first 14 matches were all played at the Adelaide Oval in Adelaide.) In March 1927, whilst umpiring a grade cricket game between Sturt and Kensington at the Adelaide Oval, Hele was struck in the temple by a ball thrown from the square leg fielder, and, after collapsing, had to be escorted from the field. Hele served as secretary of the South Australian Cricket Umpires' Association, and, following on from his football playing career, also served as a goal umpire for SAFL matches, subsequently also filling the role of secretary of the South Australian National Football Umpires' Association.

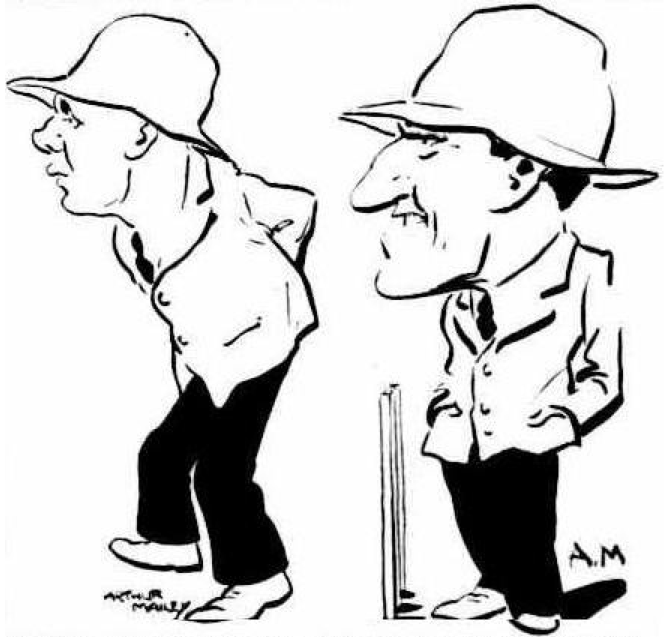
A 1932 cartoon depicting Hele (left) and George Borwick, umpiring partners in the Bodyline series.

In November 1928, Hele (along with Dave Elder, who had been umpiring Tests since the 1911–12 Ashes series) was selected to umpire in the First Test of the 1928–29 Ashes series, held at the Brisbane Exhibition Ground. A South Australian umpire had not been selected to umpire in Test cricket since George Watson umpired alongside Bob Crockett in 1912. Hele and Elder umpired in each of the first four Tests, with Elder replaced by New South Welshman Alfred Jones for the final match in Melbourne, Victoria. The matches in the series were notable for their duration, having been played under the "timeless" format. The final Test of the series lasted for eight days, while the two preceding Tests had each lasted for seven days. In recognition of his service, which made him the first person to umpire each match in a five-Test series, Hele was presented with a commemorative cricket ball by the proprietors of the Wisden Cricketers' Almanack at the conclusion of the series. Hele was subsequently selected to umpire during matches in the West Indies' tour of Australia in 1930–31 and the South African tour of Australia in 1931–32, as well as continuing to umpire Sheffield Shield matches. He was chosen to umpire during England's 1932–33 Australian tour, which became known for the use of intimidatory bowling tactics by England's captain, Douglas Jardine, colloquially referred to as "Bodyline". Although Hele remained neutral throughout the controversial tour, he would write at the series' end that, in his opinion, "we have seen the last of this type of bowling in Australia".

Continuing to umpire in South Australia, Hele was employed by a local Adelaide paper, The Advertiser, to explain some of the lesser-known laws of cricket and their interpretations, in a series entitled "Cricket As Umpires See It". He would also occasionally write columns for The Mail. Hele moved to Melbourne in 1933, for work, and took up umpiring in the VCA District competition. He was used by the Victorian Cricket Association (VCA) as the state's main umpire, officiating in most games involving Victoria in the 1933–34 and 1934–35 seasons, although he did not umpire at Test level again. Hele officially retired from umpiring in August 1935. He remained involved in cricket after his retirement. He occasionally appeared on Melbourne radio stations 3AW and 3UZ, where he was interviewed on umpiring matters. Serving as an umpires coach for the VCA until well into his sixties, Hele actually substituted for another umpire in a first-class match in 1948. During the third day of the testimonial match for Sir Donald Bradman, in December 1948, Andrew Barlow was hit on the head by a pull shot from Vic Raymer, and was relieved by Hele for the rest of the day.

== Later life ==
In 1974, Hele and former South Australian cricketer Richard Whitington wrote Bodyline Umpire, a book reflecting on the Bodyline era. In the book, Hele criticised Douglas Jardine's tactics during the series, expressing that he had "never seen more vicious bowling". Hele died in Preston, a suburb of Melbourne, on 28 August 1982, having been widowed thirteen years previously. His obituary was published in the 1982 edition of the Wisden Cricketers' Almanack. He had married Matilda Jane Hann on 12 March 1918 at the Baptist Church on Flinders Street in the Adelaide city centre. Their son, Raymond George Hele (1920–1983), also served as an umpire, umpiring a total of 31 first-class games between 1949 and 1960. The Heles thus became the first family to have three generations umpire first-class cricket in Australia.

== Reputation ==
Although known primarily for his role in the Bodyline series, Hele was recognised as the best umpire in South Australia at the time of his selection to umpire in Test matches, and was held in high regard by players and officials from both Australian teams and touring international teams. In an interview after Hele's first Test series as umpire, the English captain, Percy Chapman reported that, although the English missed the retired Bob Crockett, Hele had "proved a worthy successor to that great umpire, and [he] would hold his own anywhere". Despite Hele's opinion of Douglas Jardine's tactics during the bodyline, Jardine respected his umpiring ability, and in a 1932 letter to an Australian cricket official, placed him on the same level as England's Frank Chester: "as you know, we in England bracket Hele and Chester as the two best umpires in the world". Similarly, Sir Donald Bradman wrote in his 1950 book Farewell to Cricket that both he and the Englishmen agreed that Hele was "the best Australian umpire between the two wars". In 1959, writing his book Australian Cricket: A History, noted cricket journalist Johnny Moyes wrote "in the opinion of those qualified to judge, [Hele] was perhaps the finest umpire Australia has produced". As late as 1970, a journalist described Hele as a "gentle man, still tall and erect, and with a keen eye".

Hele was on friendly terms with many of the notable players whom he umpired, and he maintained a collection of "souvenirs" which had been given to him by players and officials in gratitude for his service. These included:

- a platinum wrist watch from the Nawab of Pataudi, the Indian captain
- a necktie from South African Quintin McMillan
- a baggy green from Australian captain Bill Woodfull
- England caps from Jack Hobbs, Maurice Tate, Ernest Tyldesley, and Bill Voce
- English county caps from Herbert Sutcliffe (Yorkshire) and George Duckworth (Lancashire)
- a Cambridge University cap from West Indian captain Jackie Grant

Also an avid collector of cricket memorabilia and writing, Hele was said to possess "one of the finest cricket libraries in Australia", with a collection of over 350 books, often personally autographed by their authors.

== See also ==
- List of Australian Test cricket umpires
