= Roger Rayson =

Australian cricketer (born 1942)

Personal information
- Full name: Roger Rayson
- Born: 17 February 1942 (age 84); Windsor, Victoria, Australia
- Batting: Left-handed
- Bowling: Slow left-arm wrist-spin
- Role: Bowler
- Relatives: Maxwell Rayson (father); William Rayson (grandfather)

Domestic team information
- Years: Team
- 1964/65–1966/67: Victoria
- FC debut: 6 November 1964 Victoria v Western Australia
- Last FC: 18 November 1966 Victoria v Western Australia

Career statistics
Competition	First-class
Matches	18
Runs scored	78
Batting average	7.09
100s/50s	0/0
Top score	36
Balls bowled	3,178
Wickets	45
Bowling average	39.24
5 wickets in innings	1
10 wickets in match	1
Best bowling	6/97
Catches/stumpings	7/–
- Source: CricketArchive, 27 May 2022

Roger William Rayson (born 17 February 1942) is a former Australian cricketer who played 124 matches for the Melbourne Cricket Club from 1963–64 to 1974–75, and played 18 first-class matches for Victoria.

== Cricket ==
His father, Maxwell Rayson, played three matches for Victoria in the 1937/38 season, and his grandfather, William Rayson, played six games for the state between the 1924/25 and 1928/29 seasons.

A left-arm wrist-spinner, Rayson took his best bowling figures against South Australia in 1965–66, with figures of 6 for 97 and 4 for 91 in the drawn match.
