= English cricket team in Australia in 1920–21 =

Tour of Australia by an English national team

An England team toured Australia between November 1920 and March 1921. The tour was organised by the Marylebone Cricket Club and matches outside the Tests were played under the MCC name. The tour itinerary consisted of thirteen first-class matches, including a series of five Test matches against Australia in which The Ashes were at stake.

== Tour review ==
The tour was the first to have Test status after the First World War. It followed tours by the Australian Imperial Forces cricket team which played a number of first-class matches in England, South Africa and Australia immediately after the war. The last Ashes series had been the 1912 Triangular Tournament held in England that year.

Although the tourists were relatively successful in their first-class matches against the Australian state teams, losing only one, the Test series "resulted, as everyone knows, in disaster" and England became the first team ever to lose every match in a five-Test series.

Wisden commented that the chief cause of England's failure was the bowling, because all of the bowlers used were expensive and recorded high averages. Much has been made of Australia's ability to recover from the effects of the war more quickly than England and Wisden commented that "English cricket had not had time to regain its pre-war standard".

== Test series summary ==
=== First Test ===
17–22 December 1920
(Timeless Test)
Scorecard

Australia	v	England
267 (114.5 overs); HL Collins 70; JW Hearne 3/77 (34 overs)		190 (59.1 overs); FE Woolley 52; JM Gregory 3/56 (23.1 overs)
581 (192.3 overs); WW Armstrong 158; CH Parkin 3/102 (35.3 overs)		281 (102.5 overs); JB Hobbs 59; C Kelleway 3/45 (15.5 overs)

Australia won by 377 runs
Sydney Cricket Ground, Sydney
Umpires: RM Crockett and AC Jones

- Australia won the toss and elected to bat.
- 19 December was taken as a rest day
- HL Collins, JM Gregory, JM Taylor, CE Pellew, J Ryder, WAS Oldfield and AA Mailey (all AUS), and CAG Russell, EH Hendren, A Waddington and CH Parkin (all ENG) made their Test debuts.

=== Second Test ===
31 December 1920 – 4 January 1921
(Timeless Test)
Scorecard

Australia	v	England
499 (137.3 overs); CE Pellew 116; H Howell 3/142 (37 overs)		251 (87.3 overs); JB Hobbs 122; JM Gregory 7/69 (20 overs)
		157 (f/o) (67.2 overs); FE Woolley 50; WW Armstrong 4/26 (15.2 overs)

Australia won by an innings and 91 runs
Melbourne Cricket Ground, Melbourne
Umpires: RM Crockett and DA Elder

- Australia won the toss and elected to bat.
- 2 January was taken as a rest day
- RL Park (AUS), and JWH Makepeace and H Howell (both ENG) made their Test debuts.

=== Third Test ===
14–20 January 1921
(Timeless Test)
Scorecard

Australia	v	England
354 (108 overs); HL Collins 162; CH Parkin 5/60 (20 overs)		447 (132.1 overs); CAG Russell 135*; AA Mailey 5/160 (32.1 overs)
582 (185.5 overs); C Kelleway 147; H Howell 4/115 (34 overs)		370 (106.2 overs); JB Hobbs 123; AA Mailey 5/142 (29.2 overs)

Australia won by 119 runs
Adelaide Oval, Adelaide
Umpires: RM Crockett and DA Elder

- Australia won the toss and elected to bat.
- 16 January was taken as a rest day
- EA McDonald (AUS), and PGH Fender (ENG) made their Test debuts.
- The match aggregate of 1753 runs is the highest where all 40 wickets fell.

=== Fourth Test ===
11–16 February 1921
(Timeless Test)
Scorecard

England	v	Australia
284 (99.2 overs); JWH Makepeace 117; AA Mailey 4/115 (29.2 overs)		389 (112.1 overs); WW Armstrong 123*; PGH Fender 5/122 (32 overs)
315 (117 overs); W Rhodes 73; AA Mailey 9/121 (47 overs)		211/2 (64.2 overs); JM Gregory 76*; CH Parkin 1/46 (12 overs)

Australia won by 8 wickets
Melbourne Cricket Ground, Melbourne
Umpires: RM Crockett and DA Elder

- England won the toss and elected to bat.
- 13 February was taken as a rest day.
- A Dolphin (ENG) made his Test debut.

=== Fifth Test ===
25 February – 1 March 1921
(Timeless Test)
Scorecard

England	v	Australia
204 (70.1 overs); FE Woolley 53; C Kelleway 4/27 (20 overs)		392 (91.3 overs); CG Macartney 170; PGH Fender 5/90 (20 overs)
280 (101.2 overs); JWHT Douglas 68; AA Mailey 5/119 (36.2 overs)		93/1 (34.2 overs); W Bardsley 50*; ER Wilson 1/8 (6 overs)

Australia won by 9 wickets
Sydney Cricket Ground, Sydney
Umpires: RM Crockett and DA Elder

- England won the toss and elected to bat.
- 27 February was taken as a rest day
- ER Wilson (ENG) made his Test debut.

== Summary of other first-class matches ==
- South Australia (Adelaide Oval) — MCC won by an innings and 55 runs
- Victoria (Melbourne Cricket Ground) — MCC won by an innings and 59 runs
- New South Wales (Sydney Cricket Ground) — New South Wales won by 6 wickets
- Queensland (Brisbane Exhibition Ground) — MCC won by an innings and 41 runs
- Australian XI (Brisbane Exhibition Ground) — match drawn
- Victoria (Melbourne Cricket Ground) — MCC won by 7 wickets
- New South Wales (Sydney Cricket Ground) — match drawn
- South Australia (Adelaide Oval) — MCC won by an innings and 63 runs

== England touring party ==
The England touring party consisted of 16 players led by Essex all-rounder Johnny Douglas.

When the party was originally selected, Reggie Spooner was invited to be the team captain but he was obliged to stand down for domestic reasons. Vallance Jupp had been selected too but was unable to travel. Jupp's withdrawal was shortly before departure and meant that his replacement Bill Hitch had to catch a later boat than the main party. There was another withdrawal when Jack Hearne was taken ill during the Second Test and could not play again that season.

There was a controversy over Rockley Wilson who sent match reports by cable to the Daily Express. As a result, MCC resolved at a meeting the following May to bar players from reporting on matches in which they were involved.

=== All-rounders ===
- Johnny Douglas, Essex (captain)
- Percy Fender, Surrey
- J W Hearne, Middlesex
- Wilfred Rhodes, Yorkshire
- Rockley Wilson, Yorkshire
- Frank Woolley, Kent

=== Batsmen ===
- Patsy Hendren, Middlesex
- Jack Hobbs, Surrey
- Harry Makepeace, Lancashire
- Jack Russell, Essex

=== Bowlers ===
- Bill Hitch, Surrey
- Harry Howell, Warwickshire
- Cec Parkin, Lancashire
- Abe Waddington, Yorkshire

=== Wicketkeepers ===
- Arthur Dolphin, Yorkshire
- Bert Strudwick, Surrey

== Australian players in Test series ==
Australia used 14 players in the Test series. Eight players took part in all five matches including the captain Warwick Armstrong.

=== All-rounders ===
- Warwick Armstrong, Victoria (captain)
- Charles Kelleway, New South Wales
- Jack Gregory, New South Wales

=== Batsmen ===
- Warren Bardsley, New South Wales
- Herbie Collins, New South Wales
- Charlie Macartney, New South Wales
- Roy Park, Victoria
- Nip Pellew, South Australia
- Jack Ryder, Victoria
- Johnny Taylor, New South Wales

=== Bowlers ===
- Ted McDonald, Victoria
- Arthur Mailey, New South Wales

=== Wicketkeepers ===
- Sammy Carter, New South Wales
- Bert Oldfield, New South Wales

== Ceylon ==
The English team had a stopover in Colombo en route to Australia and played a one-day single-innings match there against the Ceylon national team, which at that time did not have Test status.
