= Doug McKay (disambiguation) =

Doug McKay (born 1929) is a former ice hockey player in the NHL.

Doug or Douglas McKay may also refer to:

- Douglas McKay (1893–1959), 25th Oregon governor and 35th U.S. Secretary of the Interior
- Douglas Imrie McKay (1879–1962), NYPD police commissioner
- Doug McKay (public servant) (1923–2012), senior Australian public servant
- Douglas McKay (cricketer) (1904–1994), Australian cricketer
