= Philip Lee (cricketer) =

Australian sportsman

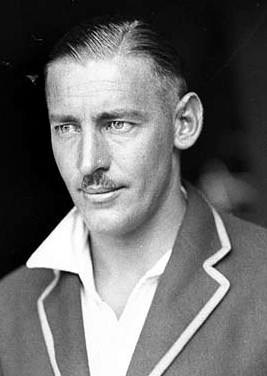
- Lee in the 1930s

Personal information
- Full name: Philip Keith Lee
- Born: 15 September 1904; Gladstone, South Australia
- Died: 9 August 1980 (aged 75); Woodville, South Australia
- Nickname: Perka / Perker
- Batting: Right-handed
- Bowling: Right-arm off break Right-arm medium

International information
- National side: Australia
- Test debut (cap 138): 18 December 1931 v South Africa
- Last Test: 23 February 1933 v England

Domestic team information
- Years: Team
- 1925/26–1934/35: South Australia

Career statistics
Competition	Test	First-class
Matches	2	55
Runs scored	57	1,669
Batting average	19.00	18.54
100s/50s	0/0	2/6
Top score	42	106
Balls bowled	436	10,987
Wickets	5	152
Bowling average	42.39	30.15
5 wickets in innings	0	6
10 wickets in match	0	0
Best bowling	4/111	5/23
Catches/stumpings	1/–	24/–
- Source: ESPNcricinfo, 29 August 2020

Philip Keith Lee (15 September 1904 – 9 August 1980) was an Australian cricketer who played in two Test matches from 1931 to 1933.

During the early 1920s, he was a leading Australian rules footballer in the South Australian Football League and played at interstate level for South Australia. He was a member of the Norwood Football Club's 1923 premiership team. He originally mainly played as a half-forward, but after missing some games due to a leg injury he returned in 1926 to play as a half-back.

As a cricketer, Lee was a hard-hitting right-handed batsman and a right-arm bowler of off breaks. He played several matches for South Australia from 1925 to 1926, originally batting in middle order and bowling infrequently. From 1930, his off-break bowling developed and he was called into the Australian Test side for the second match of the rather one-sided series with South Africa at Sydney in 1931–32. With Clarrie Grimmett and Bert Ironmonger in the side, Lee had limited bowling and took only one wicket.

The emergence of Bill O'Reilly as a Test-class spin bowler later in the same series seemed likely to limit Lee's prospects for further Test caps, but the following season, 1932–33, he was recalled for the fifth match in the Bodyline series against England after Grimmett had lost form. In Australia's first innings, batting at No 8, he hit 42 out of a stand of 57 in 35 minutes with Bert Oldfield, and in England's first innings, though brought on to bowl after O'Reilly and Ironmonger, he was Australia's most successful bowler with four wickets for 111 runs. In the second innings, he was last out for 15 as Australia collapsed to Hedley Verity, and he failed to take a wicket as England won by eight wickets.

Though playing in two Test trial matches, Lee had a poor bowling season in 1933–34, and with Grimmett's return to form he was not picked for the tour of England in 1934. He played one further season for South Australia and then retired.

He attended St Peter's College, Adelaide, where he captained their cricket, football, tennis and athletics teams. He married Mary Lucas in June 1935.
