= Norman Williams (Australian cricketer) =

Australian cricketer (1899–1947)

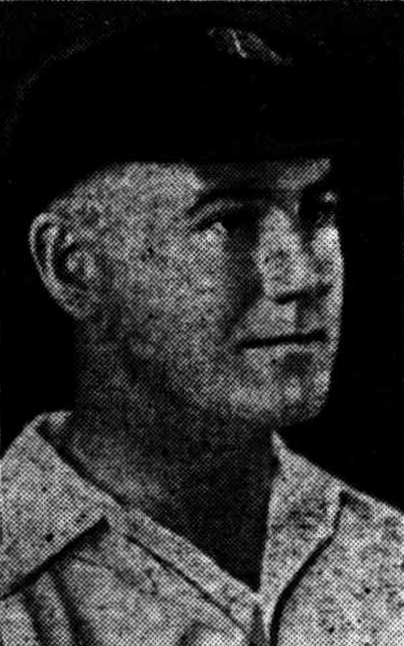

Personal information
- Full name: Norman Leonard Williams
- Born: 23 September 1899; Semaphore, South Australia
- Died: 31 May 1947 (aged 47); Semaphore, South Australia
- Batting: Right-handed
- Bowling: Right-arm leg spin
- Role: Bowler

Domestic team information
- Years: Team
- 1919/20–1928/29: South Australia

Career statistics
Competition	First-class
Matches	34
Runs scored	850
Batting average	15.45
100s/50s	0/5
Top score	56
Balls bowled	4,778
Wickets	122
Bowling average	39.16
5 wickets in innings	9
10 wickets in match	3
Best bowling	6/40
Catches/stumpings	12/–
- Source: CricketArchive, 3 November 2015

Norman Leonard Williams (23 September 1899 – 31 May 1947) was an Australian first-class cricketer who played for South Australia from 1919/20 to 1928/29.

Born in Semaphore, South Australia to Captain Thomas and E.J. Williams, Williams was the brother of Lou, Ethel, Fred, Tom and Jack.

Playing for Port Adelaide Cricket Club, Williams developed into a leading leg spin bowler in Adelaide district cricket while still a teenager. There was a public call for Williams to be picked for South Australia, with one supporter stating Williams "is young and full of energy, a brilliant field, and a fair bat if needed, he can bowl all day ... (he) is not tempted to toss them up at all times; and, if he strikes a length, is the type of bowler able to run through any side."

Williams made his first-class debut for South Australia aged twenty against New South Wales at the Adelaide Oval on 19 December 1919, scoring 50 and zero and taking 3/138 as South Australia lost by and innings and 330 runs.

Described as a "stocky right-arm leg-spinner who gave the ball plenty of air, and who relied on flight and sharp spin in the manner of Arthur Mailey to trap his victims", Williams's best performance with the ball was against Queensland at the Adelaide Oval in December 1923, where he took 6/40 with match figures of 12/195. However, the arrival of Clarrie Grimmett for the 1923/24 season relegated Williams to South Australia's second choice spin bowler and was selected only once in 1924/25 and not at all during the 1925/26 season.

In 1926/27, however, Williams had an excellent season for Port Adelaide, ultimately taking 80 wickets at 14.83 for the season, and was recalled to the South Australian side. In his first match back for South Australia, against Victoria at the Adelaide Oval, Williams took match figures of 12/234, compared with Grimmett's 3/227 and Victorian spinner Don Blackie's 10/245.

During the season, Williams was called "probably the most improved bowler in Australia, ... his length is now fairly accurate. and he can turn the ball both ways. His "bosey" ball is cunningly concealed, and has proved most troublesome. Williams is one of the most popular players in South Australian cricket and has an ideal temperament for the game. Williams was the biggest wicket taker in first-class cricket in 1926/27, taking 35 wickets at 32, compared to Blackie with 33 at 24.6, Grimmett 30 at 34.3 and Mailey 20 wickets at 42.

Williams's improved form saw him selected for "The Rest" against an Australian XI, played at the Sydney Cricket Ground starting on 18 February 1927, where he took 6/174.

In October 1927 Williams became captain of Port Adelaide succeeding Dave Pritchard. He had a poor season in 1927/28, taking only five wickets at 73.00 and while he took 24 wickets at 34.9 in 1928/29, Williams retired from first-class cricket with his final appearance in January 1929, for South Australia against New South Wales, taking 2/95. He continued in district cricket until 1943, taking 894 wickets for Port Adelaide at 18.85. This remains the record number of wickets taken in the Adelaide district competition. Eleven times, and nine in succession, Williams was the leading wicket taker in a district cricket season.

Outside of cricket Williams was a dentist and became involved in horse racing as an owner. He owned leading racehorse Ramssare as part of a syndicate and later became the sole owner of Jack Parr, who won an ARC grand national steeple-chase.

Williams died suddenly on 31 May 1947, aged 47. In recognition of his district cricket accomplishments, the scoreboard at Port Adelaide's home ground Alberton Oval, was named in Williams's honour.

South Australian wicketkeeper and Port Adelaide captain Gordon Inkster paid tribute to Williams, saying that "had he applied himself more seriously he would most certainly have made one of the world's greatest bowlers of his type. On numerous occasions when he could have secured many of the closing wickets, he refrained from so doing, to enable another of the younger bowlers to procure a wicket or two, with the result that he was responsible for the developing of several young bowlers to the advantage of both club and State."

== Sources ==
- Sando, G. (1997) Grass Roots: 100 Years of Adelaide District Cricket 1897–1997, South Australian Cricket Association: Adelaide. ISBN 1 86254 435 2.
