= Bert Ironmonger =

Australian cricketer

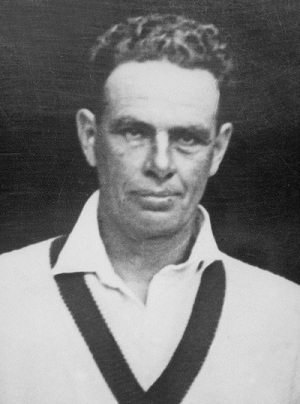

Personal information
- Born: 7 April 1882; Pine Mountain, Queensland, Australia
- Died: 31 May 1971 (aged 89); St Kilda, Victoria, Australia
- Nickname: Dainty
- Batting: Left-handed
- Bowling: Left-arm off spin
- Role: Bowler

International information
- National side: Australia
- Test debut (cap 125): 30 November 1928 v England
- Last Test: 23 February 1933 v England

Domestic team information
- Years: Team
- 1909–1913: Queensland
- 1914–1936: Victoria

Career statistics
Competition	Tests	First-class
Matches	14	96
Runs scored	42	476
Batting average	2.62	5.95
100s/50s	0/0	0/0
Top score	12	36*
Balls bowled	4695	27431
Wickets	74	464
Bowling average	17.97	21.50
5 wickets in innings	4	36
10 wickets in match	2	11
Best bowling	7/23	8/31
Catches/stumpings	3/0	31/0
- Source: ESPNcricinfo, 10 February 2020

Herbert Ironmonger (7 April 1882 – 31 May 1971) was an Australian cricketer. He played Test cricket from 1928 to 1933, playing his last Test at the age of 50. He is the second-oldest Test cricketer.

== Life and career ==
=== Before World War I ===
Ironmonger was born in Pine Mountain, near Ipswich, Queensland, the youngest of ten children of a farmer. As a child, he lost the forefinger of his left hand (his bowling hand) in an industrial accident. He lived and worked on the family farm at Pine Mountain until he was 25. He played for the Albert club in Ipswich for 15 years, taking well over 1000 wickets at an average of fewer than six runs each.

He only made his first-class debut for Queensland at the age of 27. After a few matches for Queensland, he moved to Victoria in 1914, accepting a position offered by Hugh Trumble as professional bowler at the Melbourne Cricket Club. Thinking his age might tell against him – he was 31 – he gave his birth date as 1886, making him supposedly 27. The new date became his accepted birth date for the rest of his cricket career. In his second match for Melbourne, he took 9 for 30 against St Kilda, and was immediately selected to play for Victoria. In the 1914–15 season, he was the outstanding bowler in the Sheffield Shield, taking 32 wickets in Victoria's four matches at an average of 17.12, and Victoria won the competition. He was also the leading wicket-taker that season in the Melbourne competition, which his Melbourne club won in its first year in the competition.

=== After World War I ===
Ironmonger resumed successfully after World War I but was hampered by injuries to his knees, and by his reputation as a poor batsman and fielder. He was not selected for the Test team, but he went with the Australian team to New Zealand late in the 1920–21 season, made up of leading players who had not made the Test team. He took 45 wickets on the tour at 13.17, and made his highest first-class score of 36 not out, in less than 20 minutes, against Southland in Invercargill.

Shortly after the tour, on 14 May 1921, he married Bess Tierney at St Brigid's Church in North Fitzroy. They moved to Sydney, where he ran a pub in Balmain. He played for Balmain in the Sydney competition in 1921–22 and took 51 wickets, more than anyone else in the competition. The pub was not a success, and late in 1922 the couple returned to Melbourne, where he opened a tobacconist's shop in St Kilda. He lost his stock in a burglary in 1923 and could not afford to re-stock and start again, so he took a position with St Kilda City Council maintaining the municipal parks and gardens, where he remained for the rest of his working life.

Ironmonger joined the St Kilda club at the start of the 1922–23 season, along with another 40-year-old spin bowler, Don Blackie. They eventually played together for St Kilda for 12 years, during which time St Kilda won six premierships. When they retired, Ironmonger had taken 862 wickets in his grade cricket career in Melbourne, which as of 2021 is still the highest career tally for the competition, and Blackie had taken 803, which is still the second-highest tally.

After three seasons out of first-class cricket, Ironmonger returned to the Victorian side during the 1924–25 season. In his second match, he took a hat-trick against the touring MCC while taking 5 for 93 off 39.5 eight-ball overs. The Victorian team toured New Zealand at the end of the season, but Ironmonger declined his invitation as he could not take the required time off work. He did not re-establish his spot in the Victorian team until 1927–28, when he took 25 wickets in the Sheffield Shield at an average of 29.12 (Don Blackie took 31 at 22.22) and Victoria won the Shield.

=== Test career ===
Ironmonger's Test debut came in 1928–29 when he was 46. He played Test cricket until the age of 50, and first-class cricket until the age of 53. He is the fourth-oldest Test debutant and the second-oldest Test player.

Unsurprisingly, because of his age, his Test career spanned only 14 matches, during which he took 74 wickets at an average of 17.97. In that time, though he achieved some outstanding results.

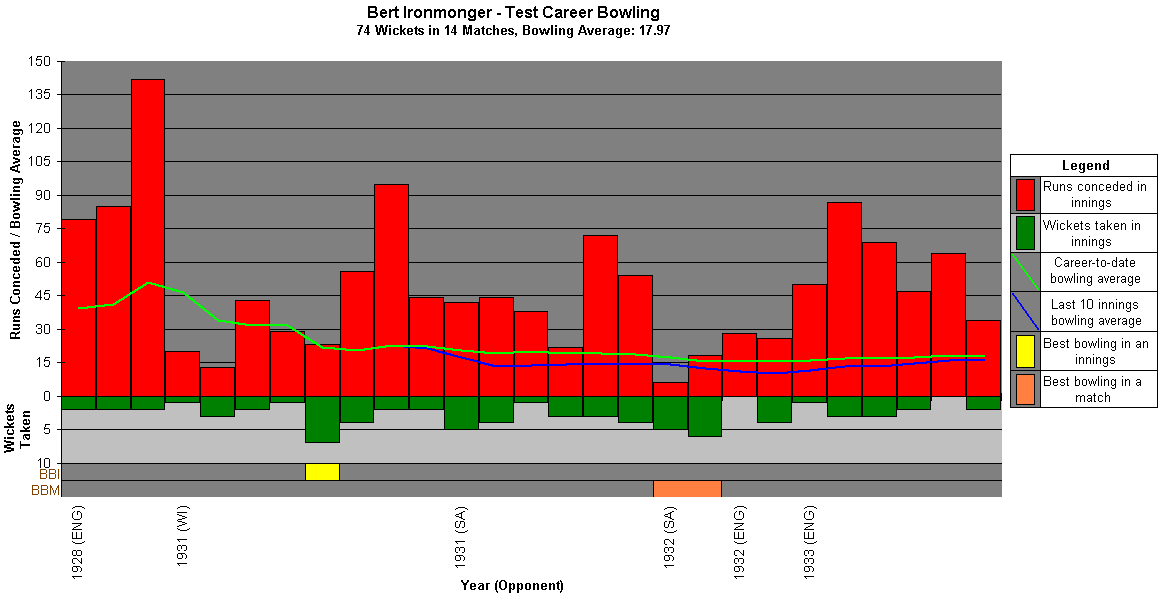
A graph showing Ironmonger's Test career bowling statistics and how they varied over time.

- 11 wickets for 79 runs against the West Indies in Melbourne in 1930–31
- 9 wickets for 89 runs against South Africa in Brisbane in 1931–32
- 11 wickets for 24 against South Africa in Melbourne in 1931–32
- He took 31 wickets in the 1931–32 South African series
- Bert Ironmonger also set the record for becoming the oldest Test cricketer to take his maiden five-wicket haul as well as a 6fer, 7fer in a Test innings at the age of 48 years and 312 days. He was also the oldest-ever Test cricketer to take a five-wicket haul as well as a 6fer in an innings of a Test match at the age of 49 years and 311 days. He, too, set the record for becoming the oldest Test cricketer to take 10 wickets in a Test match at the age of 49 years and 311 days.

Ironmonger's contemporary, the Australian Test batsman and captain Vic Richardson, said of him:

I would say unhesitatingly that he stood head and shoulders above any other left-hander, not even excepting Wilfred Rhodes. His ability to turn the ball even on the smoothest shirt-front wickets – wickets that break the heart and reputation of most bowlers – was amazing. On a wicket that assisted him or a crumbly or wet wicket, he was well nigh unplayable.

Ironmonger died aged 89 in St Kilda, Melbourne. A grandstand at the Junction Oval in St Kilda bears his and Don Blackie's names.

== See also ==
- List of Victoria first-class cricketers
