= Ernest O'Brien (cricketer) =

Australian cricketer

Personal information
- Born: 26 August 1900; Sydney, Australia
- Died: 2 November 1935 (aged 35); Newcastle, New South Wales, Australia
- Source: ESPNcricinfo, 12 January 2017

Ernest O'Brien (26 August 1900 – 2 November 1935) was an Australian cricketer. He played three first-class matches for New South Wales between 1926/27 and 1927/28.

== See also ==
- List of New South Wales representative cricketers
