= Maxwell Rayson =

Australian cricketer

Personal information
- Full name: Maxwell William Rayson
- Born: 26 August 1912; Kew, Victoria, Australia
- Died: 11 May 1993 (aged 80); Melbourne, Australia

Domestic team information
- Years: Team
- 1937/38: Victoria
- Source: Cricinfo, 22 November 2015

Maxwell William Rayson (26 August 1912 – 11 May 1993) was an Australian cricketer. He played three first-class cricket matches for Victoria during the 1937–38 season.
