= Eric Knowles (cricketer) =

Australian cricketer

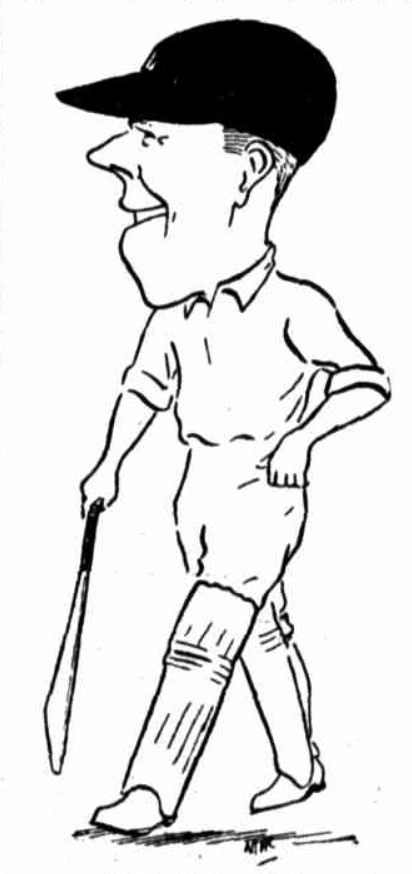

Personal information
- Full name: Eric Charles Knowles
- Born: 9 March 1896; Toowoomba, Queensland, Australia
- Died: 15 September 1978 (aged 82); Southport, Queensland
- Batting: Right-handed

Domestic team information
- Years: Team
- 1925-26 to 1928-29: Queensland

Career statistics
Competition	First-class
Matches	4
Runs scored	267
Batting average	33.37
100s/50s	1/0
Top score	144
Balls bowled	0
Wickets	–
Bowling average	–
5 wickets in innings	–
10 wickets in match	–
Best bowling	–
Catches/stumpings	2/0
- Source: Cricinfo, 22 August 2019

Eric Charles Knowles (9 March 1896 – 15 September 1978) was a first-class cricketer who played for Queensland from 1926 to 1928.

When he was a 15-year-old schoolboy at Toowoomba Grammar School, Knowles represented Toowoomba against the touring MCC in 1911-12, opening the bowling and top-scoring in Toowoomba's first innings with 22 not out. He served with the First AIF in Egypt and France during the First World War, and was mentioned in despatches. He took up fruit-farming at Stanthorpe when he returned. In October 1919 he married Stella Hooper in Ipswich.

After a few years he moved to Brisbane, playing with the Western Suburbs club, which he captained from 1926 to 1936, leading them to the premiership in 1931-32. His work allowed him only four appearances for Queensland. In 1926-27, Queensland's first season in the Sheffield Shield, he scored 40 and 144 in Queensland's victory over Victoria.

His elder brother was Sir George Knowles.
