= Norval Campbell =

Australian cricketer

Personal information
- Born: 21 September 1908; Sydney, Australia
- Died: 11 September 1977 (aged 68); St Ives, New South Wales, Australia
- Source: ESPNcricinfo, 24 December 2016

Norval Campbell (21 September 1908 – 11 September 1977) was an Australian cricketer. He was educated at North Sydney Boys High School. He played eleven first-class matches for New South Wales between 1926/27 and 1934/35. In 1926, he took six wickets for 118 runs in an innings, and was the youngest leg spinner to achieve a five-wicket haul in the Sheffield Shield until Lloyd Pope took seven wickets for 87 runs in October 2018.

== See also ==
- List of New South Wales representative cricketers
