= Norbert Phillips =

Australian cricketer

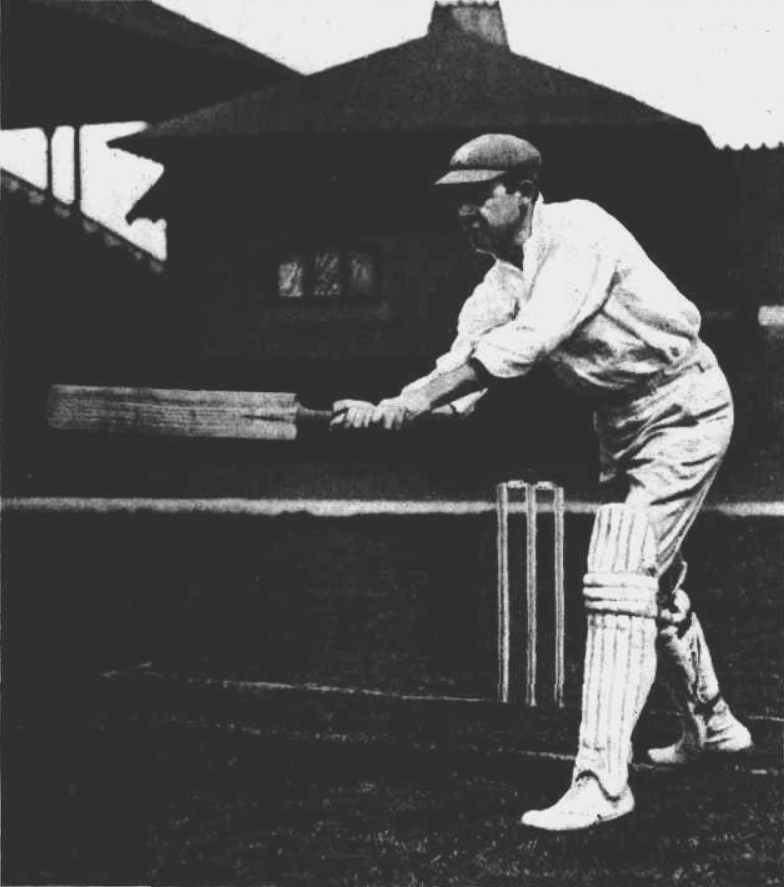

Personal information
- Born: 9 July 1896; Cowra, New South Wales, Australia
- Died: 3 October 1961 (aged 65); Sydney, Australia
- Source: ESPNcricinfo, 15 January 2017

Norbert Phillips (9 July 1896 – 3 October 1961) was an Australian cricketer. He played seventeen first-class matches for New South Wales between 1922/23 and 1929/30.

== See also ==
- List of New South Wales representative cricketers
