= Timeless Test =

Longest form of cricket, played without time limit

A timeless Test is a match of Test cricket played under no limitation of time, which means the match is played until one side wins or the match is tied, with theoretically no possibility of a draw. The format means that it is not possible to play defensively for a draw when the allotted time runs out, and delays due to bad weather will not prevent the match ending with a positive result. It also means that there is far less reason for a side to declare an innings, since time pressure should not affect the chances of winning the game.

Although the format should guarantee a result, it was ultimately abandoned as it was impossible to predict with any certainty when a match would be finished, making scheduling and commercial aspects difficult. In the modern era teams often play back-to-back Tests in consecutive weeks, something that would be impossible without the five-day limit.

== History ==
There were 99 timeless Tests between 1877 and 1939.

Until World War II all Tests in Australia were timeless. Only two of these matches were drawn, both against England in 1882, when the matches had to be left unfinished owing to shipping schedules. Pitches were left uncovered during matches, and in the Australian climate the well-watered prepared pitches would dry out and crack and crumble as the match progressed, usually making batting more difficult by the fourth or fifth day. The longest Test match in Australia was the Fifth Test between Australia and England in Melbourne in 1929, which lasted for eight playing days. Australia won by five wickets in front of an eighth-day crowd of 20,000.

The ninth match of the 1912 Triangular Tournament, between England and Australia, was the first timeless Test to be played in England. Some series outside Australia had the final Test changed to a timeless Test if the series result depended on the outcome of the match. This is what happened in Kingston in 1930, when the Fourth (and final) Test between West Indies and England lasted for seven playing days and had to be abandoned owing to shipping schedules, and at The Oval in 1938, when England batted for the first two and a half days of the Fifth Test and made 903 for 7 before declaring and dismissing Australia twice by the end of the fourth day, and in Durban in 1938-39.

The first timeless Test in South Africa was held in Durban in February 1923, when the series between England and South Africa was undecided after four matches. England won early on the sixth day of play. The start of one day's play was delayed while groundstaff removed frogs from the coconut matting.

The last timeless Test was the Fifth Test between England and South Africa at Durban in 1939, which was abandoned as a draw after nine days of play spread over twelve days, otherwise the England team would have missed the boat for home. This match had started on 3 March. South Africa had set a target of 696 for England to win. By the time England had to leave to catch their boat home, on 14 March, England had reached 654 for 5 (the highest ever first-class fourth innings score). This is the longest Test cricket match on record. The match had not been expected to take more than five days, but rain and rolling rejuvenated the pitch three times during the match, and it was still in good condition for batting when the match was abandoned.

The ICC was considering implementing a timeless Test for the final of the ICC World Test Championship.

== Comparison to other sports ==
Baseball is one of the few other sports that does not have any time limit. Baseball games can be suspended (paused), such that they can also be played across multiple days. Unlike the lack of tiebreaker for tied timeless Tests, baseball can have extra innings. The longest professional baseball game lasted over 8 hours, split between multiple days.

Tennis traditionally features no set time finish. The longest professional match lasted 11 hours and 5 minutes split over 3 days during the 2010 Wimbledon Championships, before tie-breakers were introduced partially in response to the match.

== List of Timeless Tests ==
Test Matches	Home team	Away team
2 Tests in 1876–77	Australia	England
1 Test in 1878–79	Australia	England
4 Tests in 1881–82	Australia	England
4 Tests in 1882–83	Australia	England
5 Tests in 1884–85	Australia	England
2 Tests in 1886–87	Australia	England
1 Test in 1887–88	Australia	England
3 Tests in 1891–92	Australia	England
5 Tests in 1894–95	Australia	England
5 Tests in 1897–98	Australia	England
5 Tests in 1901–02	Australia	England
5 Tests in 1903–04	Australia	England
5 Tests in 1907–08	Australia	England
5 Tests in 1910–11	Australia	South Africa
5 Tests in 1911–12	Australia	England
1 Test in 1912	England	Australia
5 Tests in 1920–21	Australia	England
1 Test in 1922–23	South Africa	England
5 Tests in 1924–25	Australia	England
1 Test in 1926	England	Australia
5 Tests in 1928–29	Australia	England
1 Test in 1929–30	West Indies	England
1 Test in 1930	England	Australia
5 Tests in 1930–31	Australia	West Indies
5 Tests in 1931–32	Australia	South Africa
5 Tests in 1932–33	Australia	England
1 Test in 1934	England	Australia
5 Tests in 1936–37	Australia	England
1 Test in 1938	England	Australia
1 Test in 1938–39	South Africa	England

== See also ==
- The result in cricket
