= William Rowe (cricketer) =

Australian cricketer

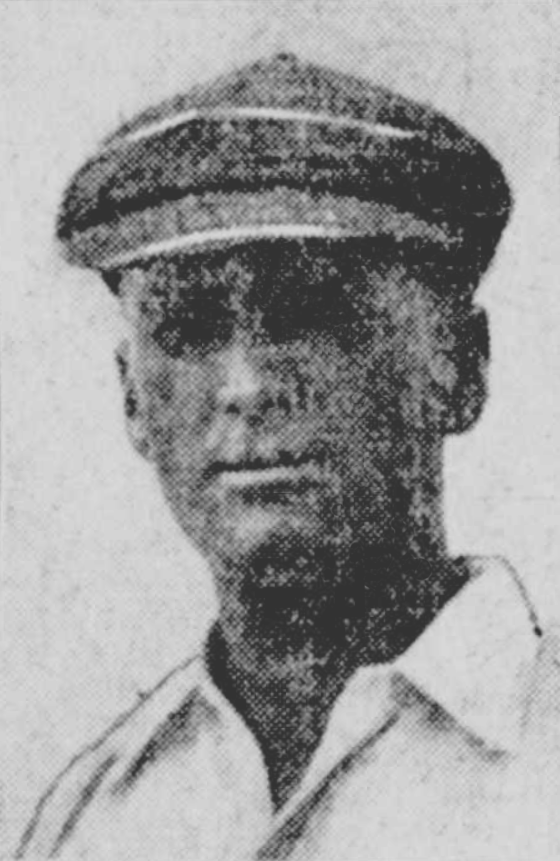

Personal information
- Born: 10 January 1892; Brisbane, Queensland, Australia
- Died: 3 September 1972 (aged 80); Brisbane, Queensland, Australia
- Source: Cricinfo, 6 October 2020

William Rowe (10 January 1892 – 3 September 1972) was an Australian cricketer. He played in 47 first-class matches for Queensland between 1912 and 1931.

== See also ==
- List of Queensland first-class cricketers
