= Frank Morton (cricketer) =

Australian cricketer (1901–1971)

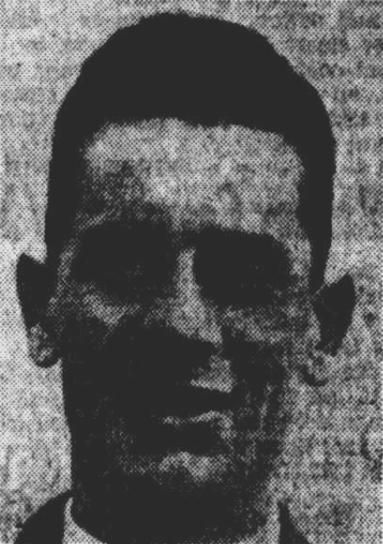

Personal information
- Full name: Francis Lonsdale Morton
- Born: 21 December 1901; Fullarton, South Australia
- Died: 14 October 1971 (aged 69); Caulfield, Victoria
- Batting: Right-handed
- Bowling: Right-arm fast-medium

Domestic team information
- Years: Team
- 1921/22–1922/23: South Australia
- 1926/27–1931/32: Victoria

Career statistics
Competition	First-class
Matches	28
Runs scored	204
Batting average	7.84
100s/50s	0/0
Top score	23 not out
Balls bowled	6127
Wickets	94
Bowling average	32.75
5 wickets in innings	3
10 wickets in match	0
Best bowling	5/40
Catches/stumpings	14/–
- Source: Cricket Archive, 1 May 2015

Francis Lonsdale Morton (21 December 1901 – 14 October 1971) was an Australian cricketer who played first-class cricket from 1922 to 1932.

A fast bowler, Morton made his first-class debut for South Australia in the 1921–22 season. He played a few more games for South Australia before moving to Melbourne during the 1922–23 season. He made his debut for Victoria in 1926–27. In his second match Victoria compiled the world record score of 1107; Morton, batting at number 10, was run out without scoring.

He took 23 wickets at an average of 34.78 in the 1926–27 season, and 28 wickets at 27.96 in 1927–28, when Victoria won the Sheffield Shield and Morton was the leading pace bowler in the competition. He was selected in a 13-man squad to tour New Zealand at the end of the season on the basis of his "sheer pace". He played in four of the six first-class matches on the tour, including one of the two against New Zealand, but he took only seven wickets, and none at all against New Zealand. He was more successful in the minor matches.

In later years his form fell away. He took only one wicket (that of Douglas Jardine) when Victoria played MCC in November 1928. His last four matches were played against Tasmania, as captain, when Victoria fielded weaker teams than its Sheffield Shield side. In his last match, in 1931–32, he took his career-best figures in the second innings, 5 for 40, including a hat-trick.

== See also ==
- List of Victoria first-class cricketers
