= Ray McNamee =

Australian cricketer

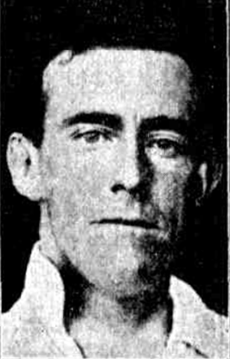

Personal information
- Full name: Raymond Leonard Alphonsus McNamee
- Born: 26 August 1895; Orange, New South Wales
- Died: 18 September 1949 (aged 54); Little Bay, New South Wales
- Batting: Right-handed
- Bowling: Right-arm medium-pace off-spin

Domestic team information
- Years: Team
- 1926-27 to 1928-29: New South Wales

Career statistics
Competition	First-class
Matches	19
Runs scored	87
Batting average	5.80
100s/50s	0/0
Top score	14
Balls bowled	6049
Wickets	72
Bowling average	30.27
5 wickets in innings	5
10 wickets in match	1
Best bowling	7/21
Catches/stumpings	11/0
- Source: Cricket Archive, 4 May 2015

Raymond Leonard Alphonsus McNamee (26 August 1895 – 18 September 1949) was an Australian cricketer who played first-class cricket for New South Wales from 1926 to 1929.

== Early life and career ==
Born in Orange, Ray McNamee went to school at Waverley College in Sydney, and played cricket for Randwick in the Sydney grade competition.

A medium-pace bowler, McNamee was a member of the New South Wales practice squad in 1925-26, and made his first-class debut for New South Wales in the 1926-27 Sheffield Shield, when he was 31. His first match was also Queensland's first Shield match. He opened the bowling throughout the season, finishing as the team's leading bowler, with 27 wickets at an average of 29.81, and conceding just over two runs per eight-ball over.

In the fourth match in 1926-27 he took no wicket for 124 as Victoria made the world record score of 1107. In the final match of the competition in Sydney he took 7 for 21 to dismiss Victoria for 35. On a damp pitch, "He kept a splendid length, turning the ball sharply from the off, and at times making it get up very awkwardly ... at one stage he took five wickets without a run being scored off him." At the end of the season he played for The Rest against an Australian XI, taking five wickets.

== 1927-28 ==
McNamee had two outstanding matches to start the 1927-28 Sheffield Shield season. In Adelaide he took 5 for 53 off 29.2 overs as South Australia made 189 for 9 to win the match. A week later, after Bill Ponsford and Bill Woodfull had put on 227 for the first wicket for Victoria in Melbourne, he took 7 for 77 and Victoria were dismissed for 355. The Argus noted that on a perfect pitch, McNamee bowled with both "an out swing and an in turn" and that his performance "marks him as the most promising bowler in Australia, and the importance to Australian cricket is very great". Ponsford thought "it may be that he will prove to be the man for whom Australia is looking. He more than most bowlers today resembles the old type of medium paced trundler, who gained their successes by accuracy of length, spin, and a direct attack on the batsmen's defences."

Although McNamee had suffered from ill health during the season, he was selected in the 13-man Australian team to tour New Zealand at the end of the season. He was Australia's main pace bowler on the tour, taking 15 wickets at 16.46 in the first-class matches, including seven wickets at 17.71 in the two matches against New Zealand. The New Zealand Herald described his performance against Auckland, when he took 5 for 12 off 21 six-ball overs, as "one of the finest bowling performances ever seen in New Zealand", describing his bowling thus: "a peculiar run up to the wickets, with rather a low delivery ... a little faster than medium pace ... it is the manner in which he makes the ball fizz off the pitch that upsets the calculations of the batsmen".

== Later career ==
Despite his success in 1927-28, McNamee lost form in 1928-29 and played only two matches, with little success, and that was the end of his first-class career. Slowness in the field may also have hampered his advancement. He continued to play successfully for Randwick, bowling mostly off-spin. He was the leading wicket-taker in Sydney grade cricket for three consecutive seasons: 1931-32 (62 wickets), 1932–33 (56) and 1933-34 (50).

He died in 1949 at the age of 54. He was survived by his wife and their son.

== See also ==
- List of New South Wales representative cricketers
