= Leslie Keating =

Australian cricketer

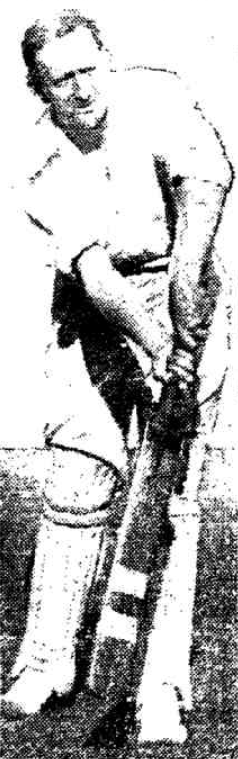

Personal information
- Born: 1 October 1891; Melbourne, Australia
- Died: 13 March 1962 (aged 70); Melbourne, Australia

Domestic team information
- Years: Team
- 1919-1925: Victoria
- Source: Cricinfo, 19 November 2015

Leslie Keating (1 October 1891 – 13 March 1962) was an Australian cricketer. He played 16 first-class cricket matches for Victoria between 1919 and 1925.

== See also ==
- List of Victoria first-class cricketers
