= Cecil Thompson (cricketer) =

Australian cricketer (1890–1963)

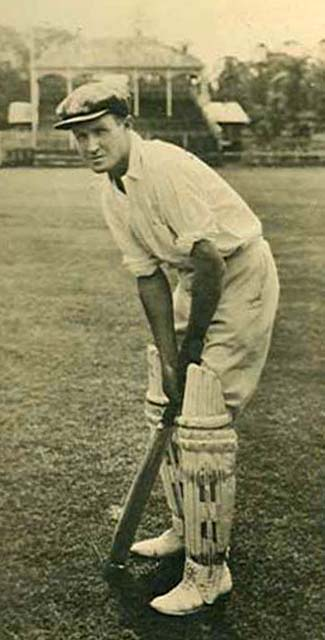

Personal information
- Full name: Francis Cecil Thompson
- Born: 17 August 1890; Stanwell, Queensland, Australia
- Died: 24 September 1963 (aged 73); Southport, Queensland, Australia
- Batting: Right-handed
- Bowling: Right-arm medium-pace

Domestic team information
- Years: Team
- 1912–13 to 1933–34: Queensland

Career statistics
Competition	First-class
Matches	58
Runs scored	4132
Batting average	42.16
100s/50s	11/17
Top score	275*
Balls bowled	2935
Wickets	31
Bowling average	41.87
5 wickets in innings	0
10 wickets in match	0
Best bowling	4/21
Catches/stumpings	15/0
- Source: Cricinfo, 14 April 2018

Francis Cecil Thompson (17 August 1890 – 24 September 1963) was an Australian first-class cricketer who played for Queensland from 1912 to 1933.

== Biography ==
Educated at Brisbane Grammar School, Cecil Thompson made his first-class debut against New South Wales in 1912–13. He was one of the leading Queensland batsmen in the 1920s, along with Leo O'Connor. He played for University in district cricket until moving to South Brisbane in 1925. In the 1925–26 season, in matches for Queensland and his South Brisbane club, he scored 1525 runs at an average of 152.50.

In 1926–27, in Queensland’s first Sheffield Shield match, he scored their first century in the first innings (O'Connor scored a century in the second innings). In the 1928–29 Sheffield Shield he scored 743 runs at an average of 74.30; in the whole competition only Don Bradman scored more. A careful player, judiciously selecting which ball to hit, Thompson had great powers of concentration, scoring 275 not out in 628 minutes against New South Wales in 1930–31, the highest individual score at the Brisbane Exhibition Ground.

A schoolteacher, Thompson’s cricket career was restricted by country postings. He spent three years in the country after World War I and had another country stint from 1933.
