= Bert Davie =

Australian sportsman

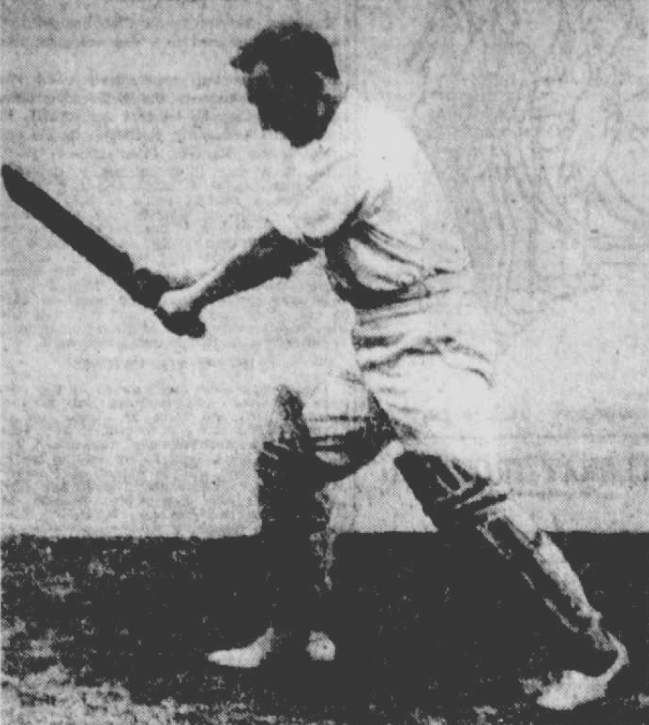

Personal information
- Full name: Bert Joseph James Davie
- Born: 2 May 1899; Hobart, Tasmania
- Died: 3 June 1979 (aged 80); Melbourne, Victoria
- Original team: Geelong Cadets

Playing career^{1}
| Years | Club | Games (Goals) |
| 1917–1919 | Geelong | 27 (1) |
- ^{1} Playing statistics correct to the end of 1919.

Bert Joseph James "Poddy" Davie (2 May 1899 – 3 June 1979) was an Australian sportsman who represented Tasmania and Victoria at first-class cricket and played Australian rules football with Geelong in the Victorian Football League (VFL).

Davie was recruited locally to Geelong and played 14 games during the 1917 VFL season, which had been depleted due to the war, and a further 12 games in 1918. He made the seniors just once in 1919 and in what was his last game he kicked the only goal of his career.

An opening batsman, Davie made his first-class debut in the 1921/22 summer, for Tasmania against Victoria at Launceston. He scored 56 in both innings and also claimed the wicket of Clarrie Grimmett. Victoria's wicket-keeper in that match, Jim Atkinson, played in the VFL and had also been Davie's opponent when he made his league debut. Davie played another first-class match a year later and then did not make another appearance until 1927, this time a Sheffield Shield fixture for Victoria. It was his final match and he finished his cricket career with 179 runs at 35.80 and just the one wicket at a total cost of 167 runs.

== See also ==
- List of Victoria first-class cricketers
- List of Tasmanian representative cricketers
