= Alfred Williams (umpire) =

Australian cricket umpire (died 1933)

Alfred Percy Williams (died 22 May 1933) was an Australian cricket Test match umpire.

Williams umpired 15 first-class matches, all at the Sydney Cricket Ground, between 1919 and 1928. He umpired one Test match, between Australia and England, played at the Sydney Cricket Ground on 19 to 27 December 1924. This match was notable for being the first Test match in which the 8-ball over was used, for Bill Ponsford's century on debut, and for the 127-run partnership for the 10th wicket between Johnny Taylor and Arthur Mailey, still Australia's best for this wicket. Williams' colleague was Alfred Jones.

He died at his home in Paddington, Sydney, leaving a widow, Lucy.

== See also ==
- List of Test cricket umpires
