= John Scott (cricket and rugby league) =

Australian cricketer, test match umpire & rugby league player

Jack Scott
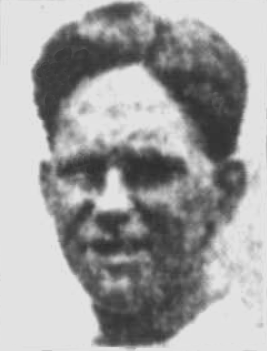

Personal information
- Full name: John Drake Scott
- Born: 31 January 1888 Petersham, New South Wales, Australia
- Died: 7 April 1964 (aged 76) South Australia

Playing information
- Position: Centre
Club
Years	Team	Pld	T	G	FG	P
1908–09	Newtown	10	9	15	1	59
- Cricket career

Cricket information
- Batting: Right-handed
- Bowling: Right-arm fast
- Role: Bowler

Domestic team information
- Years: Team
- 1908/09–1924/25: New South Wales
- 1925/26–1928/29: South Australia

Umpiring information
- Tests umpired: 10 (1936–1947)

Career statistics
Competition	First-class
Matches	59
Runs scored	1,113
Batting average	14.64
100s/50s	1/4
Top score	100
Balls bowled	12,177
Wickets	227
Bowling average	28.31
5 wickets in innings	12
10 wickets in match	1
Best bowling	6/48
Catches/stumpings	35/–
- Source: CricInfo, 15 September 2024

John Drake Scott (31 January 1888 – 7 April 1964) was an Australian cricketer and Test match umpire. Scott played as a right-arm fast bowler and was also a useful lower-order right-handed batsman. He was the first man to dismiss Don Bradman in first-class cricket, in December 1927. Scott went on to umpire fifty games, including ten Ashes Tests.

== Cricket career ==
Born in Sydney, Scott's first-class playing career ran for two decades, from 1908–09 to the 1928–29 Australian seasons. During this time he played 59 matches. He also played rugby league for Newtown and in 1908 had the distinction of scoring the club's first ever premiership try.

The bulk of his cricket career was spent with New South Wales, but he moved to South Australia for the 1925–26 season. Scott's best bowling figures were 6–48 against Victoria, taken in 1909–10. The 1913–14 season saw him make his only century, exactly 100 against Queensland.

After his retirement from playing, Scott stood as a first-class umpire on more than 50 occasions, including ten Test matches between 1936 and 1947. His first match was between Australia and England at the Brisbane Cricket Ground on 4 to 9 December 1936, a match convincingly won by the visitors. Scott's partner in that match was George Borwick.

Scott and Borwick went on to stand in another nine Ashes Tests matches together: a further four as part of the 1936–37 tour and five more on the 1946–47 tour. Scott's last match was at the Sydney Cricket Ground on 28 February to 5 March 1947.

As a player, Scott was regarded as a "likeable larrikin". In his early career, Johnnie Moyes compared him to Tibby Cotter, while Jack Pollard called him "a fiery, outspoken fast bowler with a long record of defying authority". Indeed, Scott was barred for an entire Sydney grade season after a show of bad temper. As an umpire, he earned a reputation for disciplining fast bowlers for bowling short rising deliveries – the type of bowling for which he had been known.

Scott died at Springbank, South Australia at the age of 76.

== See also ==
- List of Test cricket umpires

== Footnotes ==
- Moyes, A. G., Australian Cricket: A History, Sydney, Angus & Robertson, 1959.
- Pollard, Jack, Australian Cricket: 1918–1948, The Bradman Years. Sydney, The Book Company, 1995. (ISBN 0-207-15596-8)
- Pollard, Jack, Australian Cricket: The game and the players. Sydney, Hodder & Stoughton, 1982. (ISBN 0-340-28796-9)
- Statistical summary, CricketArchive
