= Ron Oxenham =

Australian cricketer

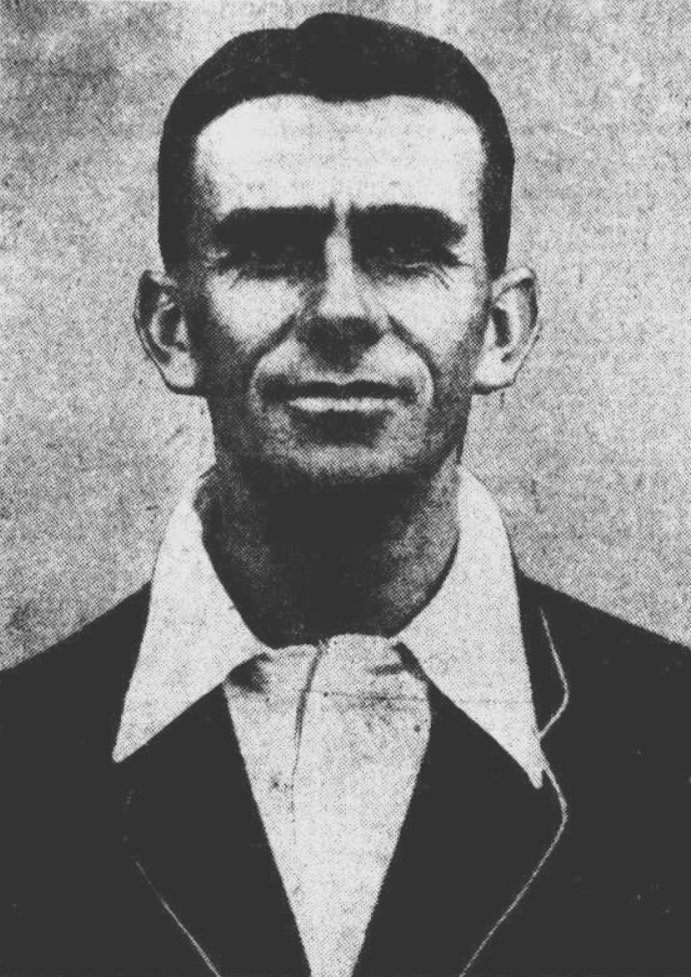
- Oxenham in 1927

Personal information
- Born: 28 July 1891; Nundah, Brisbane, Queensland
- Died: 16 August 1939 (aged 48); Nundah, Brisbane, Queensland
- Batting: Right-handed
- Bowling: Right-arm medium

International information
- National side: Australia
- Test debut (cap 129): 29 December 1928 v England
- Last Test: 27 November 1931 v South Africa

Career statistics
Competition	Test	First-class
Matches	7	97
Runs scored	151	3,693
Batting average	15.09	25.64
100s/50s	0/0	4/19
Top score	48	162*
Balls bowled	1,802	21,769
Wickets	14	369
Bowling average	37.28	18.67
5 wickets in innings	0	22
10 wickets in match	0	8
Best bowling	4/39	9/18
Catches/stumpings	4/–	45/–
- Source: Cricinfo, 13 October 2022

Ronald Keven Oxenham (28 July 1891 – 16 August 1939) was an Australian cricketer who played in seven Test matches from 1928 to 1931.

== Early life ==
Ron was born to Augustus Emmanuel and Elizabeth Oxenham (née Perry) at the Brisbane suburb of Nundah in late July 1891.

== First-class career ==
Oxenham (aged 20) debuted for Queensland in a match at the SCG against New South Wales in November 1911. After a long career, he played his last first-class match (aged 45) against South Australia in February 1937.
