= Douglas McKay (cricketer) =

Australian cricketer

Personal information
- Born: 2 July 1904; Adelaide, Australia
- Died: 9 April 1994 (aged 89); Adelaide, Australia
- Source: Cricinfo, 19 August 2020

Douglas McKay (2 July 1904 – 9 April 1994) was an Australian cricketer. He played in ten first-class matches for South Australia between 1925 and 1929.

== See also ==
- List of South Australian representative cricketers
