= Clement Garing =

Australian cricket umpire (1873–1951)

- Born: 17 December 1873; Melbourne, Victoria, Australia
- Died: 1951; Melbourne, Victoria, Australia
- Citizenship: Australian
- Occupation: Cricket umpire
- Known for: Umpiring one Test match in 1925

Clement Garing (17 December 1873 – 1951) was a cricket Test match umpire.

He umpired one Test match, between Australia and England, played at Melbourne from 1 to 8 January 1925. This match was won by Australia in spite of a 283-run opening partnership by Jack Hobbs and Herbert Sutcliffe, the latter scoring centuries in each innings, the first time this had occurred against Australia. Garing's colleague was Bob Crockett.

In all, Garing umpired 10 first-class matches, all of them in Melbourne and most of them in partnership with Bob Crockett, between December 1921 and December 1925.

== See also ==
- List of Test cricket umpires
