= William Rayson =

Australian cricketer

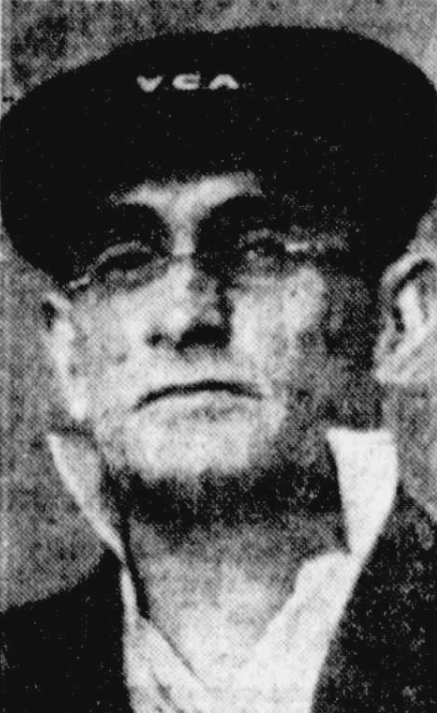

Personal information
- Born: 18 December 1889; Melbourne, Australia
- Died: 8 September 1957 (aged 67); Melbourne, Australia

Domestic team information
- Years: Team
- 1924/25–1928/29: Victoria
- Source: Cricinfo, 21 November 2015

William Rayson (18 December 1889 – 8 September 1957) was an Australian cricketer. He played six first-class cricket matches for Victoria between 1925 and 1929.
