= Johnny Moyes =

Australian cricketer, writer and commentator (1893–1963)

- Moyes broadcasting in 1962/63

Personal information
- Full name: Alban George Moyes, MC, MBE
- Born: 2 January 1893; Gladstone, Colony of South Australia
- Died: 18 January 1963 (aged 70); Chatswood, New South Wales, Australia
- Nickname: Johnny
- Batting: Right-handed
- Bowling: Right-arm leg spin
- Role: Batsman

Domestic team information
- Years: Team
- 1912/13–1914/15: South Australia
- 1919/20–1920/21: Victoria

Career statistics
Competition	First-class
Matches	16
Runs scored	883
Batting average	29.43
100s/50s	1/6
Top score	104
Balls bowled	583
Wickets	5
Bowling average	53.60
5 wickets in innings	0
10 wickets in match	0
Best bowling	2/22
Catches/stumpings	16/–
- Source: CricketArchive, 18 April 2009

Alban George "Johnny" Moyes MBE, MC (2 January 1893 – 18 January 1963) was a cricketer who played for South Australia and Victoria. Following his brief playing career, Moyes, a professional journalist, later gained greater fame as a writer and commentator on the game.

== Cricket career ==
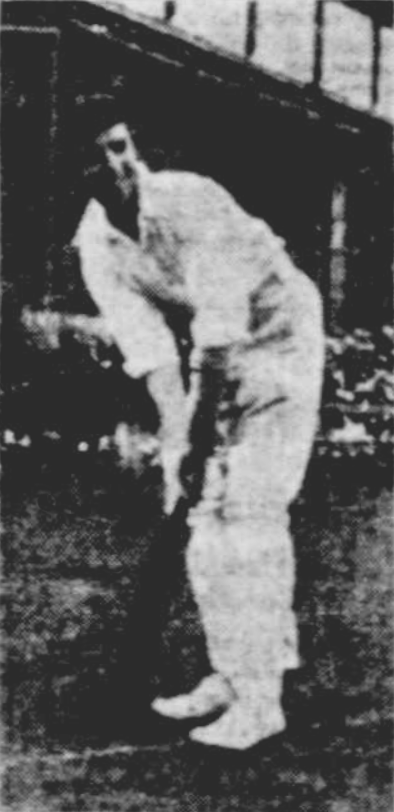
A. G. "Johnny" Moyes, 1923.

As a right-hand batsman Moyes scored 883 runs at an average of 29.43 and a highest score of 104 in 103 minutes, against Western Australia in his first season. His leg break bowling took 5 wickets at an average of 53.60, with best figures of 2 for 22. He was considered good enough to be selected for the Australian tour of South Africa in 1914, but this was cancelled because of the outbreak of the First World War. He played for the Rest of Australia against New South Wales and Victor Trumper was so impressed that he invited him to play as a guest for Gordon in a club match. However, he was dismissed for a first ball duck.

Moyes served with distinction in the First World War with the Australian Imperial Force in England and France, earning the Military Cross. He played in a number of services' matches in England and played two matches for Victoria.

Moving to Sydney as news editor and sports editor of leading newspapers, Moyes joined Gordon. In one club game, he scored 218 runs in 83 minutes. He captained Gordon to a grade premiership in 1923–24, scoring 174 in the final. As a state selector for New South Wales in 1926/27 Moyes helped Don Bradman get his first taste of interstate cricket.

== Writing and radio career ==
Moyes became well known as a cricket commentator for the ABC between 1950 and 1963. Pollard describes him as "always bright and informative, a cheery character respected by players and listeners". He was a prolific author and wrote the first definitive history of Australian cricket in 1959. Other works included books on Australian batsmen, Australian bowlers, Bradman, Benaud, and many books of tours by Test nations. For his services to sport, Moyes was appointed a Member of the Order of the British Empire.

Moyes died suddenly at his home, three days after commentating on the third Test of the 1962–63 series between Australia and England at Sydney. A few days before he died he asked the England vice-captain Colin Cowdrey to write a foreword to his book on the 1962–63 Ashes series:

Blessed with rare gifts "Johnny" Moyes was loved and respected wherever he went ... He brought to the microphone an authoritative manner, and the shrewd, quick mind of the trained journalist. If he was outspoken and fearless in his appraisal of any situation, at all times he was utterly fair and impartial. Perhaps it was in this way more than any other that he contributed so much to our great game, and that he endeared himself to all who were privileged to know him well.

== Books by Johnny Moyes ==
- Cricket Notches (1935)
- Bradman (1948)
- A Century of Cricketers (1950)
- The Fight for the Ashes 1950–51: A critical account of the English tour in Australia (1951)
- With the West Indies in Australia, 1951–52: A critical story of the tour (1952)
- The South Africans in Australia, 1952–53 (1953)
- Australian Bowlers: From Spofforth to Lindwall (1953)
- Australian Batsmen: From Charles Bannerman to Neil Harvey (1954)
- The Fight for the Ashes, 1954–55: A critical account of the English tour in Australia (1955)
- Australian Cricket: A history (1959)
- Benaud & Co.: The story of the Tests, 1958–59 (1959)
- With the West Indies in Australia, 1960–61: A critical story of the tour (1961)
- Benaud (1962)
- The Changing Face of Cricket (1963)
- With the M.C.C. in Australia, 1962–63 (1963) (completed by Tom Goodman)
