= Don Blackie =

Australian cricketer (1882–1955)

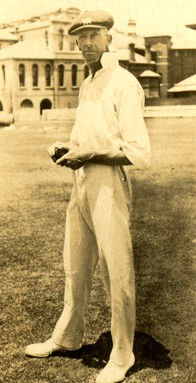

Personal information
- Full name: Donald Dearness Blackie
- Born: 5 April 1882; Bendigo, Victoria
- Died: 18 April 1955 (aged 73); South Melbourne, Victoria
- Batting: Left-handed
- Bowling: Right-arm offbreak

International information
- National side: Australia
- Test debut (cap 126): 14 December 1928 v England
- Last Test: 1 February 1929 v England

Career statistics
Competition	Test	First-class
Matches	3	47
Runs scored	24	548
Batting average	8.00	12.17
100s/50s	0/0	0/1
Top score	11*	55
Balls bowled	1,260	13,642
Wickets	14	211
Bowling average	31.71	24.10
5 wickets in innings	1	12
10 wickets in match	0	2
Best bowling	6/94	7/25
Catches/stumpings	2/–	33/–
- Source: Cricinfo, 10 September 2022

Donald Dearness Blackie (5 April 1882 – 18 April 1955) was an Australian Test cricketer who played three Tests as an off-spinner in the summer of 1928–29. At 46 years 253 days of age at the time of his Test debut, Blackie remains the oldest debutant in Australian Test cricket.

== Life ==
Blackie was born at Bendigo, Victoria in 1882. He played twelve successful seasons of Victorian Premier Cricket in Melbourne for the Hawksburn/Prahran Cricket Club between 1905–06 and 1916–17, before retiring at age 35, having taken 308 wickets for the club at 16.58. On the advice of his doctor he resumed playing at 40, joining the St Kilda club in 1922–23. He made his first-class debut in the 1924–25 season at the age of 42, and remained a fixture in the Victorian side until the end of the 1930–31 season. His last game was in 1933–34 when he was 51. He toured New Zealand with the Australian side in 1927–28, taking 21 wickets at 19.00, including nine wickets in the two matches against New Zealand.

On his Test debut, in the Second Test in 1928–29, he took 4 for 148 off 59 six-ball overs in England's only innings. In the Third Test he took 6 for 94 and 1 for 75, bowling 83 overs in the match. He took 1 for 57 and 2 for 70 in the Fourth Test. Despite his efforts, England won all three Tests, and Blackie lost his place when the selectors reinforced the pace attack for the Fifth Test (which Australia won).

His best figures came in the match Victoria played against the MCC in 1929–30, when he took 5 for 82 and 7 for 25. Like his similarly elderly spin colleague for St Kilda and Victoria Bert Ironmonger, Blackie seldom made many runs, but he once scored 55 for Victoria, helping Albert Hartkopf add 120 for the eighth wicket against South Australia in 1927–28. Unlike Ironmonger, he was a reliable fieldsman, who took numerous catches in the slips.

Blackie continued to play district cricket for St Kilda until the 1934–35 season, retiring at age 53. With St Kilda, he took 495 wickets at 14.19, and in 1926-27 became the first of only four cricketers (as of 2021) to take a ten-wicket haul in a district match, taking 10/64 against Fitzroy. His full career district figures were 803 wickets at 15.11, and his tally of wickets remains second only to Ironmonger (862) for most in district cricket history.

He died at South Melbourne in 1955 at the age of 73. Wisden described him as "An off-break bowler of wiry physique who flighted the ball and allied swerve to spin and accuracy of length, he varied his pace skilfully from medium to slow-medium."
