= Arthur Richardson (Australian cricketer) =

Australian cricketer (1888–1973)

Personal information
- Born: 24 July 1888; Clare, South Australia
- Died: 23 December 1973 (aged 85); Semaphore, South Australia
- Batting: Right-handed
- Bowling: Right-arm off-spin Right-arm medium

International information
- National side: Australia
- Test debut (cap 118): 19 December 1924 v England
- Last Test: 14 August 1926 v England

Domestic team information
- Years: Team
- 1918/19–1926/27: South Australia
- 1927/28–1929/30: Western Australia

Umpiring information
- Tests umpired: 2 (1935–1935)
- FC umpired: 14 (1934–1937)

Career statistics
Competition	Test	First-class
Matches	9	86
Runs scored	403	5,238
Batting average	31.00	41.57
100s/50s	1/2	13/16
Top score	100	280
Balls bowled	1,812	17,083
Wickets	12	209
Bowling average	43.41	31.36
5 wickets in innings	0	7
10 wickets in match	0	1
Best bowling	2/20	6/28
Catches/stumpings	1/–	34/–
- Source: Cricinfo, 29 August 2020

Arthur John Richardson (24 July 1888 – 23 December 1973) was an Australian Test cricketer who played nine Tests matches for Australia.

== Career ==
Born in Clare in rural South Australia, Richardson began playing cricket for the Sevenhills cricket club and when the club was disbanded prior to the 1911/12 season, he transferred to the Kybunga Cricket Club. An all-rounder, he topped both the Stanley Cricketing Association batting and bowling averages, scoring 738 runs at 92.20 and taking 40 wickets at 8.00.

He played four Tests in 1924–25 against the touring English team, and toured England in 1926, playing all five Tests and scoring a century in the Third Test at Leeds.

Richardson was one of the few Australians to play with spectacles. He played first-class cricket for South Australia, mostly as an opening batsman and off-spin bowler, from 1918–19 to 1926–27. In his final season he helped South Australia win the Sheffield Shield by scoring 607 runs at 67.44, including an innings of 232 against Queensland. In October 1927 he was appointed by the Western Australian Cricket Association as state coach for a two-year contract, and he played a few first-class matches for Western Australia from 1927–28 to 1929–30.

His highest first-class score was 280 (in 242 minutes) for South Australia against the MCC in 1922–23, when he became the first person to hit a century before lunch in Australia. His best bowling came in the match against Oxford University in 1926 when he took 6 for 28 and 5 for 36.

Richardson played for Bacup and Burnley Cricket Clubs in the Lancashire League in the 1930s. At his first match at Todmorden Cricket Club's ground Richardson was so overwhelmed by the scenery he stopped Todmorden player Fred Root in his bowling run up so he could admire the view. He set the record for the highest number of runs in a Lancashire League season in 1929 with 1193 runs, a record later surpassed by Everton Weekes.

He returned to South Australia in 1930 coaching for the South Australian Cricket Association, and also coached in South Africa and the West Indies. In 1935, during his coaching stint at Queen's Royal College, Port of Spain, Richardson served as an umpire in two Tests between West Indies and the touring English team. He also umpired in several matches in the Sheffield Shield in 1936–37.

Arthur Richardson is unrelated to Victor Richardson, his contemporary in the Australian and South Australian teams. They made their first-class debuts in the same match, and their Test debuts together as well, six years later.
