= Bob Crockett =

Australian cricket umpire (1863–1935)

Bob Crockett

Robert Maxwell Crockett (1863 in Hepburn, Victoria – 11 December 1935, at Footscray, Victoria), was an Australian Test match umpire.

Crockett umpired a total of 32 Test matches, the highest number by an Australian umpire until passed by Tony Crafter in his last match in 1992. His first match was between Australia and England at Sydney from 12 December to 16 December 1901, a match which England won by an innings. His colleague was Richard Callaway, also standing in his first Test match.

Crockett was inspired to take up cricket umpiring at the age of 25 by the brave deeds of "Dimboola Jim" Phillips who waged war on the chuckers of the 1890s, bowlers who threw the ball instead of bowling it. For more than 20 years he was a regular Test umpire, and his first-class career lasted for 38 years. Known as the "Chief Justice" he was, in Jack Pollard's view, "a softly-spoken, imperturbable character … precise, unemotional, lacking in sentiment … He was a stickler for decorum … [and] highly regarded by all players for his accuracy and impartiality." Johnnie Moyes, who knew him well, "appreciated his skill, his modesty, his love for cricket" and ranked him in the top three umpires he had seen, along with George Hele and Mel McInnes.

In 1900/01 in the match between New South Wales and Victoria at Sydney, Crockett no-balled the New South Wales fast bowler Jack Marsh 19 times for throwing. Spectators jeered Crockett after every occurrence, but he persisted until Marsh was taken off.

In the first Test match of the 1903/04 season, Australia was recovering from a first-innings deficit of 292 and was 2 for 191 when Clem Hill on 51 attempted a fifth run from an overthrow. In a close situation, Crockett gave him run out. Hill was adamant that he had made good his ground, and as he walked off the crowd began to chant "Crock, Crock, Crock". The English captain, Pelham Warner, threatened to take his players off unless the commotion stopped. The Australian captain, Monty Noble, who was next man in, apologised to Warner and insisted that play continue. As a consequence of this incident there was a call for tighter control of crowds at matches.

In 1907/08 Crockett refused to signal a boundary after a fieldsman deliberately kicked the ball into the fence to prevent the striker taking a single and retaining the strike at the end of the over, thus protecting a batsman of lesser ability. Crockett ruled that the kick was against the spirit of the game.

In 1926, at the tea interval of a match, admirers presented Crockett with a cheque for £1,043 (A$2,086). He is reputed to have thanked them, looked at his watch, announced it was time to resume play, and returned to the wicket without a sign of sentiment.

After his retirement at the age of 63 due to failing eyesight, he began making cricket bats at Shepherds Flat, near his birthplace, from willow cuttings sent in 1903 by English Test captain Archie MacLaren who had recently toured Australia. Legend has it that only one cutting of the six sent survived the journey, but grafted to a river willow, its progeny flourished. By the 1920s, bats made from Australian wood were shaped and sold under the R M Crockett label. The company made 5,000 bats annually, until its demise in 1956 when it was swallowed by Slazenger. The family who bought the Crockett farm continues the tradition, both as tree growers and bat shapers, and have developed a cricket ground and tourist facility on the site.

Crockett died of heart failure at his home, aged 72. At his death he was described as a "cricket bat manufacturer". He was married and had three adult children.

== See also ==
- Australian Test Cricket Umpires
- List of Test umpires
