= Hunter Hendry =

Australian cricketer (1895-1988)

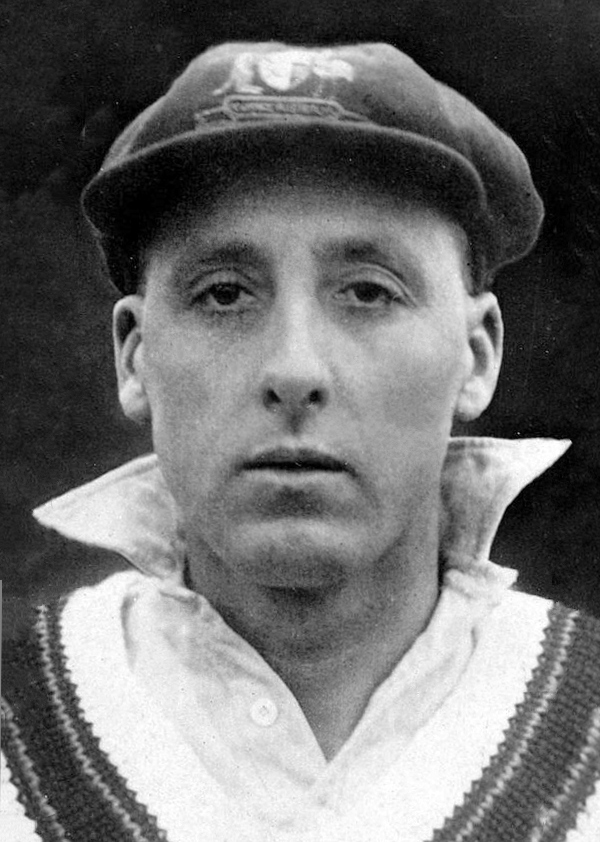

Personal information
- Full name: Hunter Scott Thomas Laurie Hendry
- Born: 24 May 1895; Woollahra, New South Wales, Australia
- Died: 16 December 1988 (aged 93); Rose Bay, New South Wales, Australia
- Nickname: Stork
- Height: 1.88 m (6 ft 2 in)
- Batting: Right-handed
- Bowling: Right-arm medium-fast
- Role: All-rounder

International information
- National side: Australia
- Test debut (cap 116): 28 May 1921 v England
- Last Test: 1 February 1929 v England

Domestic team information
- Years: Team
- 1918/19–1923/24: New South Wales
- 1924/25–1932/33: Victoria

Career statistics
Competition	Test	First-class
Matches	11	140
Runs scored	335	6,799
Batting average	20.93	37.56
100s/50s	1/0	14/34
Top score	112	325*
Balls bowled	1,706	16,601
Wickets	16	229
Bowling average	40.00	29.02
5 wickets in innings	0	6
10 wickets in match	0	1
Best bowling	3/36	8/33
Catches/stumpings	10/–	152/–
- Source: CricketArchive, 9 February 2008

Hunter Scott Thomas Laurie Hendry (24 May 1895 – 16 December 1988) was a cricketer who played for New South Wales, Victoria and Australia.

Nicknamed "Stork", Hendry was a formidable batsman to whom bowlers found difficulty in delivering. He played in 11 Tests and 140 first-class matches between 1918–19 and 1935–36.

At the time of his death, aged 93, he was the oldest surviving Test and Sheffield Shield cricketer.

== See also ==
- List of Victoria first-class cricketers
- List of New South Wales representative cricketers

Preceded by Percy Fender	Oldest living Test cricketer 15 June 1985 – 16 December 1988	Succeeded by Bill Ponsford
