= Jack Ryder (cricketer) =

Australian cricketer (1889–1977)

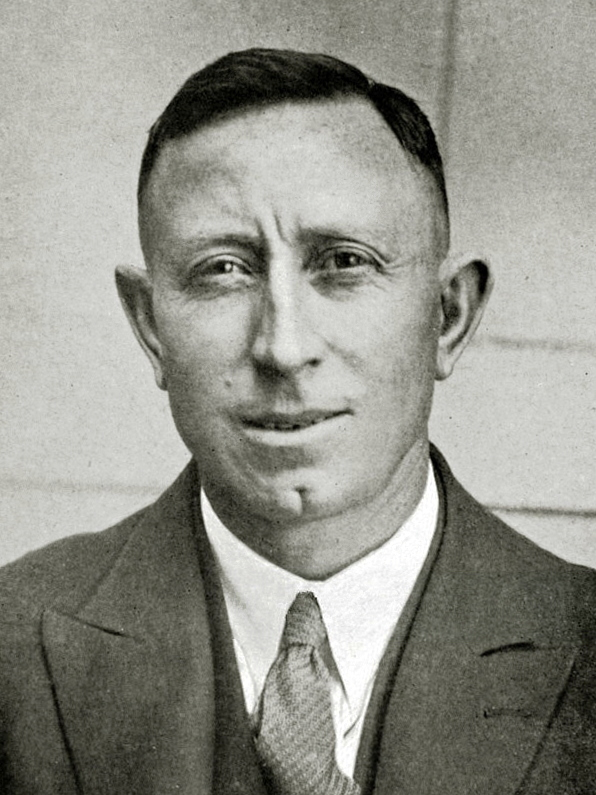
- Ryder in about 1930

Personal information
- Full name: John Ryder
- Born: 8 August 1889; Collingwood, Victoria, Australia
- Died: 3 April 1977 (aged 87); Fitzroy, Victoria, Australia
- Nickname: The King of Collingwood
- Height: 1.85 m (6 ft 1 in)
- Batting: Right-handed
- Bowling: Right-arm Fast-Medium
- Role: All-rounder

International information
- National side: Australia (1920–1929)
- Test debut (cap 111): 17 December 1920 v England
- Last Test: 8 March 1929 v England

Domestic team information
- Years: Team
- 1912–1932: Victoria

Career statistics
Competition	Tests	First-class
Matches	20	177
Runs scored	1,394	10,499
Batting average	51.62	44.29
100s/50s	3/9	24/55
Top score	201*	295
Balls bowled	1,897	15,481
Wickets	17	237
Bowling average	43.70	29.80
5 wickets in innings	0	9
10 wickets in match	0	1
Best bowling	2/20	7/53
Catches/stumpings	17/0	132/0
- Source: CricketArchive, 29 February 2008

John Ryder MBE (8 August 1889 – 3 April 1977) was a cricketer who played for Victoria and Australia.

Born in the inner-city Melbourne suburb of Collingwood, Ryder was known as the "King of Collingwood" for his long association with the local cricket team. An all-rounder, he claimed 612 wickets and scored 12,677 runs in 338 district matches.

== Career ==
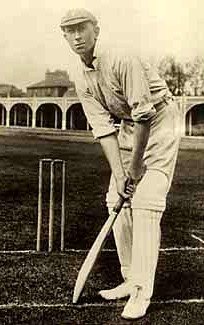
Ryder at the crease

He played in four series against England and one against South Africa. In 1921–22, he averaged more than 100 in a series against South Africa. Ryder was an aggressive batsman and strong on the drive. He was also a useful medium-pace bowler. His best performance was an innings of 201 not out against England, made in six and half hours at Adelaide in 1924–25. This included century partnerships of 134 (with Tommy Andrews) and 108 (with Bert Oldfield). He made 88 in the second innings.

In 1926–27, he made his highest first-class score of 295 (in four hours) for Victoria against New South Wales, in a world record team total of 1,107. Ryder smashed six sixes, including two in three balls, and was out attempting to hit another six to bring up his triple century. For over 50 years after his retirement, he held the record for games played and runs scored in Melbourne District Cricket, before being passed by district stalwart John Scholes.

Ryder's bowling brought him 150 wickets for Victoria and 805 in all grades and he was an outstanding fieldsman, who once caught five English batsman in a Test innings.

== Selector ==
Ryder's career as an Australia team selector was unusual. As Test captain, he was on the selection panel for the 1930 Ashes tour of England, but was out-voted for a place on the team, and the captaincy passed to Bill Woodfull. In 1946, he was made a selector again and held the post for 23 years, forming a long association with Sir Donald Bradman and Chappie Dwyer.

== Statistics and legacy ==
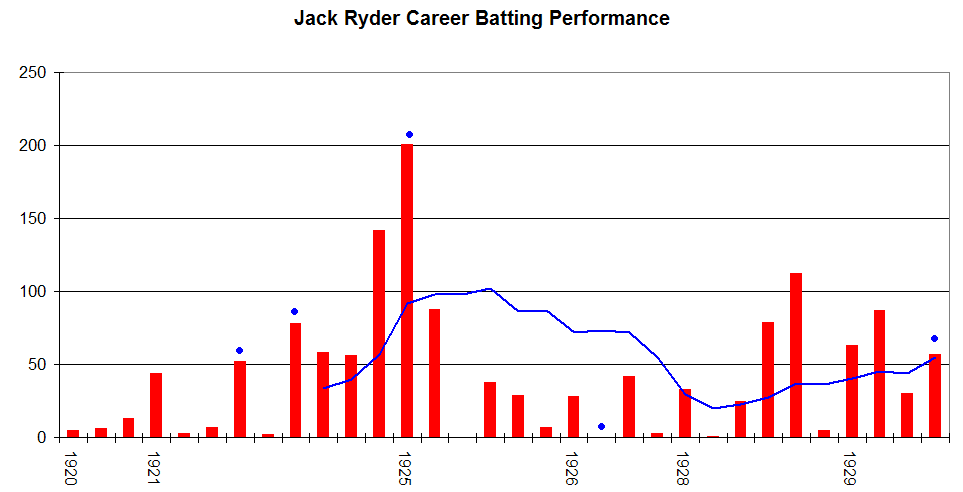
Jack Ryder's career performance graph.

He remains the only Test cricketer to be run out in both innings of his debut Test match. Ryder was also the first Australian to complete a Test Career of more than 20 innings with a batting average over 50.00.

He was the oldest former player present at the Centenary Test at the Melbourne Cricket Ground in 1977. He died just weeks after the match.

Ryder's long district cricket career for which he is best known spanned 37 years, from 1906–07 until 1942–43. His career of 338 games was played almost entirely for Collingwood, except for six games for Northcote in 1933–34 and 12 games for the VCA Colts in 1939–40. He scored 12,677 runs at 41.83 with 37 centuries, and took 612 wickets at 16.83 with 46 five-wicket hauls. The medal for the outstanding player of the season in Melbourne Premier Cricket is named in his honour, and was first presented in 1973–74.

He holds the record for facing the most number of balls in a single test innings when batting at number seven position(461)

He was also inducted into the Australian Hall of Fame by the CA in 2015.
