= Arthur Mailey =

Australian cricketer (1886–1967)

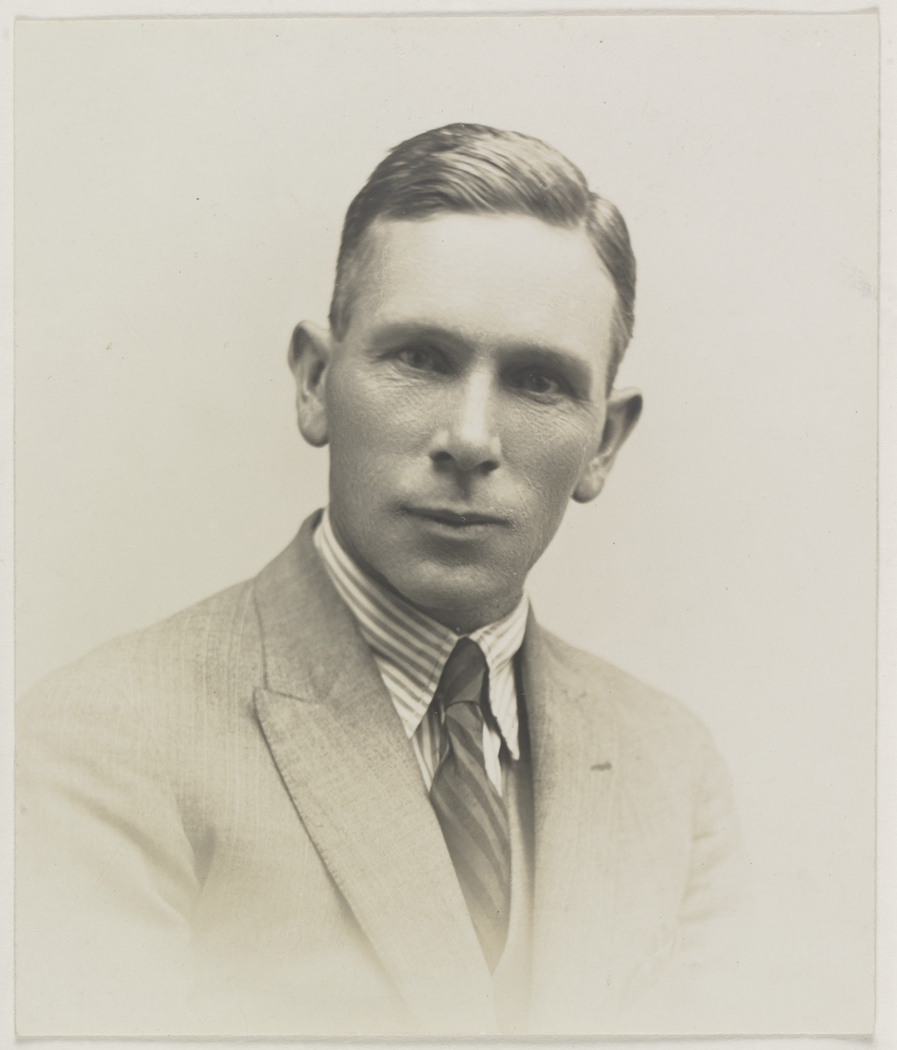
- Mailey in around 1925

Personal information
- Full name: Alfred Arthur Mailey
- Born: 3 January 1886; Zetland, New South Wales, Australia
- Died: 31 December 1967 (aged 81); Kirrawee, New South Wales, Australia
- Height: 174 cm (5 ft 9 in)
- Batting: Right-handed
- Bowling: Right-arm leg break and googly
- Role: Bowler

International information
- National side: Australia
- Test debut (cap 108): 17 December 1920 v England
- Last Test: 14 August 1926 v England

Domestic team information
- Years: Team
- 1912/13–1929/30: New South Wales

Career statistics
Competition	Test	First-class
Matches	21	158
Runs scored	222	1,530
Batting average	11.10	12.33
100s/50s	0/0	0/3
Top score	46*	66
Balls bowled	6,119	36,285
Wickets	99	779
Bowling average	33.91	24.09
5 wickets in innings	6	61
10 wickets in match	2	16
Best bowling	9/121	10/66
Catches/stumpings	14/–	157/–
- Source: ESPNcricinfo, 23 March 2017

Alfred Arthur Mailey (3 January 1886 – 31 December 1967) was an Australian cricketer who played in 21 Test matches between 1920 and 1926.

Mailey used leg-breaks and googly bowling, taking 99 Test wickets, including 36 in the 1920–21 Ashes series. In the second innings of the fourth Test at Melbourne, he took nine wickets for 121 runs, which is still the Test record for an Australian bowler.

In first-class cricket at Cheltenham during the 1921 tour, he took all ten Gloucestershire wickets for 66 runs in the second innings. His 1958 autobiography was accordingly titled 10 for 66 and All That (an allusion to the humorous book of English history, 1066 and All That).

He also holds the record for the most expensive bowling analysis in first-class cricket. Bowling for New South Wales at Melbourne in 1926–27 as Victoria scored the record first-class total of 1107, Mailey bowled 64 eight-ball overs, did not manage a maiden and took 4 for 362. He said that his figures would have been much better had not three sitters been dropped off his bowling – "two by a man in the pavilion wearing a bowler hat" and one by an unfortunate team-mate whom he consoled with the words, "I'm expecting to take a wicket any day now."

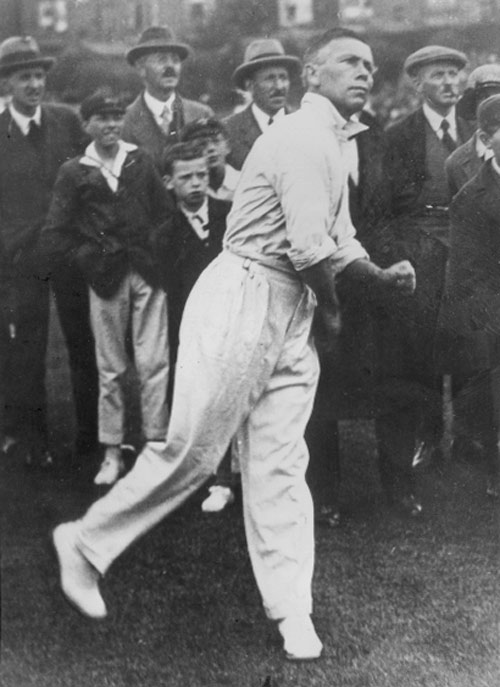
Arthur Mailey c1910

Beginning his working life at the age of 13 as a trouser presser, then was a glass blower and subsequently a Water Board labourer, he became a talented writer and artist. Between 1920 and 1953, he published a number of booklets of cartoons of cricketers of his time.

"Someone dubbed him the man who bowled like a millionaire, and how true it was! Arthur's objective was to take wickets, and the spending of runs in the process bothered him little. For a relatively small man Arthur had abnormally large hands, soft as silk to the touch, and he once told me he didn't know what it was to have tired or sore fingers". Don Bradman

Mailey married Miss Maud Hinchcllffe in 1912. They had three sons, and a daughter.

He also ran a mixed business which included a butcher on Woolooware Road, Burraneer. The back lane behind Woolooware Road and the shops there was officially named Dominic Lane in 2011, but until then had had the unofficial name of “Googly Manor Lane”. When the area was subdivided in 1954 the owner was an “Arthur Albert Mailey”, and very likely the subject of this article.

Mailey died in Kirrawee, New South Wales on 31 December 1967.
