= Alfred Jones (umpire) =

Australian cricket umpire (1859–1949)

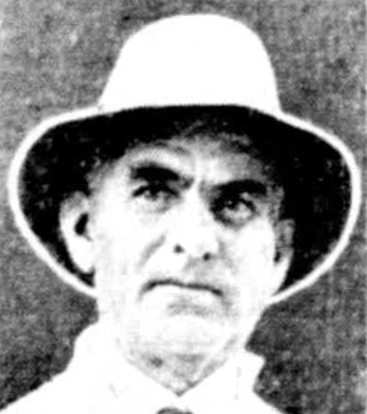
- Born: 6 June 1859; Australia
- Died: 10 February 1949 (aged 89); Sydney, New South Wales, Australia
- Occupation: Cricket umpire
- Known for: Umpiring Test matches

Alfred Charles Jones (6 June 1859 – 10 February 1949) was an Australian Test cricket umpire.

Jones umpired seven Test matches involving Australia: six against England and one against South Africa. His first Test, at Sydney on 11 December to 17 December 1903 was won comfortably by England in spite of Victor Trumper's 185 not out. Tip Foster of England scored 287, still the highest score by a batsman on debut. Of slight build, Jones was photographed with the Australian team of that series, an event not likely to occur today. Jones' Test career lasted more than 25 years, as his last match was at the Melbourne Cricket Ground on 8 March to 16 March 1929, where Don Bradman scored a century in a victorious Australian team.

In his first-class umpiring career, which extended from 1902 to 1931, Jones umpired 63 matches, 62 of them at the Sydney Cricket Ground. He umpired for 47 years in the Sydney competition before retiring in 1933.

Jones spent all his working life as a carpenter and joiner.

== See also ==
- Australian Test Cricket Umpires
- List of Test umpires
