= 1921–22 Sheffield Shield season =

Australian cricket tournament

1921–22 Sheffield Shield
- Cricket format: First-class
- Tournament format: Double round-robin
- Champions: Victoria (8th title)
- Participants: 3
- Matches: 6
- Most runs: Jack Ryder (Victoria) (484)
- Most wickets: Ted McDonald (Victoria) (25)

The 1921–22 Sheffield Shield season was the 26th season of the Sheffield Shield, the domestic first-class cricket competition of Australia. Victoria won the championship.

== Table ==
Team	Pld	W	L	D	Pts
Victoria	4	4	0	0	4
New South Wales	4	2	2	0	0
South Australia	4	0	4	0	-4

== Fixtures ==
16–21 December 1921
Scorecard

New South Wales	v	South Australia (H)
360 (74 overs); Mudgee Cranney 70; Richard Townsend 5/60 (18 overs)		376 (65.3 overs); David Pritchard 100; Lyall Wall 7/133 (25.6 overs)
439 (103.5 overs); Mudgee Cranney 144; Clive Braybrook 3/52 (11.5 overs)		406 (86.6 overs); Richard Townsend 117; Lyall Wall 4/123 (34.6 overs)

New South Wales won by 17 runs
Adelaide Oval, Adelaide
Umpires: George Hele and S. W. Smith

- New South Wales won the toss and elected to bat.

24–28 December 1921
Scorecard

New South Wales	v	Victoria (H)
254 (63.6 overs); Tommy Andrews 115; Ted McDonald 5/65 (17 overs)		302 (60.5 overs); Roy Park 122; Jack Gregory 4/71 (12.5 overs)
280 (60.6 overs); Herbie Collins 111; Albert Hartkopf 5/86 (14.6 overs)		4/233 (58.4 overs); Jack Ryder 85; Arthur Mailey 2/75 (15 overs)

Victoria won by 6 wickets
Melbourne Cricket Ground, Melbourne
Umpires: Bob Crockett and Clement Garing

- New South Wales won the toss and elected to bat.

31 December 1921 – 4 January 1922
Scorecard

(H) Victoria	v	South Australia
474 (97.1 overs); Jack Ryder 242; Arthur Richardson 5/112 (24 overs)		219 (57.4 overs); Andrew Smith 49; Ted McDonald 3/52 (15 overs)
4/97 (26.1 overs); Horace Sandford 39; Arthur Richardson 2/11 (8.1 overs)		351 f/o (88.3 overs); Andrew Smith 122; Albert Hartkopf 3/45 (16 overs)

Victoria won by 6 wickets
Melbourne Cricket Ground, Melbourne
Umpires: Dave Elder and H. J. Alessio

- Victoria won the toss and elected to bat.

6–11 January 1922
Scorecard

South Australia	v	New South Wales (H)
264 (78.5 overs); Lance Pellew 81; John Scott 4/35 (17.5 overs)		160 (40.7 overs); Gordon Morgan 52; Bill Whitty 7/66 (18 overs)
229 (70.2 overs); Percy Rundell 55; Bill Ives 4/31 (12 overs)		4/334 (66.6 overs); Tommy Andrews 129; Bill Whitty 2/82 (22 overs)

New South Wales won by 6 wickets
Sydney Cricket Ground, Sydney
Umpires: Alfred Jones and Walter French

- South Australia won the toss and elected to bat.

26–30 January 1922
Scorecard

Victoria	v	New South Wales (H)
265 (68 overs); Frank O'Keeffe 87; John Scott 5/74 (17 overs)		267 (82.5 overs); Hammy Love 69; Jack Ryder 6/60 (22.5 overs)
348 (97 overs); Jack Ryder 95; Lyall Wall 3/37 (17 overs)		192 (52.2 overs); Charlie Kelleway 45; Ted McDonald 8/84 (21.2 overs)

Victoria won by 154 runs
Sydney Cricket Ground, Sydney
Umpires: Alfred Williams and C. W. Waugh

- Victoria won the toss and elected to bat.

24–28 February 1922
Scorecard

(H) South Australia	v	Victoria
160 (42 overs); Percy Rundell 45; Percival Wallace 4/24 (12 overs)		625 (124.6 overs); Frank O'Keeffe 180; Richard Townsend 3/102 (20 overs)
233 (46.4 overs); Andrew Smith 72; Frank O'Keeffe 5/45 (6 overs)

Victoria won by an innings and 232 runs
Adelaide Oval, Adelaide
Umpires: S. W. Smith and T. W. Cook

- South Australia won the toss and elected to bat.

== Statistics ==
=== Most Runs ===
Jack Ryder 484

=== Most Wickets ===
Ted McDonald 25
