= 1919–20 Sheffield Shield season =

Australian cricket tournament

1919–20 Sheffield Shield
- Cricket format: First-class
- Tournament format: Double round-robin
- Champions: New South Wales (14th title)
- Participants: 3
- Matches: 6
- Most runs: Roy Park (Victoria) (586)
- Most wickets: Hunter Hendry (New South Wales) (22)

The 1919–20 Sheffield Shield season was the 24th season of the Sheffield Shield, the domestic first-class cricket competition of Australia. New South Wales won the championship by virtue of finishing with a better average. First-class cricket had resumed in Australia for the 1918–19 season, but the Sheffield Shield was not contested.

== Table ==
| Team | Pld | W | L | D | Pts |
|---|---|---|---|---|---|
| New South Wales | 4 | 3 | 1 | 0 | 2 |
| Victoria | 4 | 3 | 1 | 0 | 2 |
| South Australia | 4 | 0 | 4 | 0 | -4 |

== Fixtures ==
19–22 December 1919
Scorecard

| New South Wales | v | South Australia (H) |
| 690 (114 overs); James Bogle 200; Frank Lucas 5/152 (25 overs) | | 207 (44.6 overs); Percy Rundell 58; Arthur Mailey 5/87 (18 overs) |
| | | 153 f/o (40.4 overs); Vic Richardson 51*; Arthur Mailey 4/46 (13 overs) |

New South Wales won by an innings and 330 runs
Adelaide Oval, Adelaide
Umpires: A. McIntyre and F. J. C. Thomas

- New South Wales won the toss and elected to bat.

26 December 1919 – 1 January 1920
Scorecard

| (H) Victoria | v | New South Wales |
| 464 (107.2 overs); Edgar Mayne 131; Arthur Mailey 4/99 (29.2 overs) | | 295 (72.1 overs); Andrew Ratcliffe 62; Jack Ryder 5/56 (16 overs) |
| 336 (73.1 overs); Roy Park 77; Rex Norman 4/123 (21 overs) | | 389 (102.4 overs); Warren Bardsley 106; Warwick Armstrong 3/47 (26 overs) |

Victoria won by 116 runs
Melbourne Cricket Ground, Melbourne
Umpires: Bob Crockett and Dave Elder

- Victoria won the toss and elected to bat.

2–6 January 1920
Scorecard

| South Australia | v | Victoria (H) |
| 247 (60.2 overs); Percy Rundell 122*; Ted McDonald 4/71 (18 overs) | | 605 (140.5 overs); Roy Park 228; Percy Rundell 3/147 (27 overs) |
| 378 (82.1 overs); Vic Richardson 134; Warwick Armstrong 3/69 (17 overs) | | 0/21 (2 overs); Edgar Mayne 13* |

Victoria won by 10 wickets
Melbourne Cricket Ground, Melbourne
Umpires: Bob Crockett and William Bowes

- South Australia won the toss and elected to bat.

9–12 January 1920
Scorecard

| South Australia | v | New South Wales (H) |
| 249 (66.1 overs); Hugh Bridgman 65; Hunter Hendry 4/30 (19.1 overs) | | 375 (77.7 overs); Hunter Hendry 81; Bill Whitty 2/105 (26 overs) |
| 287 (66.2 overs); Arthur Richardson 95; Bill Ives 4/69 (15 overs) | | 4/162 (30.6 overs); Tommy Andrews 69*; Hugh Bridgman 2/25 (4 overs) |

New South Wales won by 6 wickets
Sydney Cricket Ground, Sydney
Umpires: Alfred Jones and Alfred Williams

- South Australia won the toss and elected to bat.

24–28 January 1920
Scorecard

| (H) New South Wales | v | Victoria |
| 521 (97.2 overs); Tommy Andrews 247*; Tom Carlton 3/140 (27 overs) | | 245 (79 overs); Edgar Mayne 82; Rex Norman 4/36 (10 overs) |
| | | 188 f/o (41.5 overs); Roy Park 65; Hunter Hendry 7/34 (12.5 overs) |

New South Wales won by an innings and 88 runs
Sydney Cricket Ground, Sydney
Umpires: J. G. Gairns and William Curran

- New South Wales won the toss and elected to bat.

27 February – 3 March 1920
Scorecard

| Victoria | v | South Australia (H) |
| 406 (88.7 overs); Jack Ryder 87; Edward Phillips 4/87 (21 overs) | | 178 (41.6 overs); Norman Williams 32; Leonard Mullett 4/45 (15.6 overs) |
| 4/318 (69.3 overs); Roy Park 104; Arthur Richardson 2/65 (23 overs) | | 543 f/o (93.4 overs); Nip Pellew 271; Leonard Mullett 4/128 (26 overs) |

Victoria won by 6 wickets
Adelaide Oval, Adelaide
Umpires: A. McIntyre and G. I. Colyer

- Victoria won the toss and elected to bat.

== Statistics ==
=== Most Runs ===
Roy Park 586

=== Most Wickets ===
Hunter Hendry 22
