= 1922 in sports =

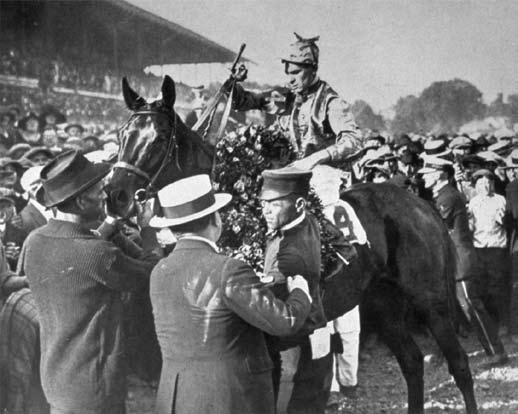
1922 Kentucky Derby

1922 in sports describes the year's events in world sport.

== American football ==
NFL championship

- Canton Bulldogs wins the APFA (NFL) title with a record of 10 wins, 0 losses and 2 ties.

College championship

- Cornell Big Red – college football national championship

Events

- 24 June — the American Professional Football Association renames itself as the National Football League.

== Association football ==
England

- The Football League – Liverpool 57 points, Tottenham Hotspur 51, Burnley 49, Cardiff City 48, Aston Villa 47, Bolton Wanderers 47
- FA Cup Final – Huddersfield Town 1–0 Preston North End at Stamford Bridge, London

Germany

- National Championship – no decision after Hamburger SV and 1. FC Nürnberg played two drawn games

Russia

- Spartak Moscow, as known well for former Soviet Union, officially founded on April 18.

== Athletics ==
Monaco

- second Women's Olympiad in Monte Carlo

France

- the first Women's World Games, Paris

== Australian rules football ==
VFL Premiership

- 14 October – Fitzroy wins the 26th VFL Premiership, defeating Collingwood 11.13 (79) to 9.14 (68) at Melbourne Cricket Ground (MCG) in the 1922 VFL Grand Final.

South Australian Football League

- 30 September – Norwood 9.7 (61) defeat West Adelaide 2.16 (28) to win their fifteenth SAFL premiership.
- Magarey Medal won by Robert Barnes (West Adelaide)

West Australian Football League

- 23 September – East Perth 7.13 (55) beat West Perth 5.9 (39) to win their fourth successive premiership
- Sandover Medal won by Harold Boyd (West Perth)

== Bandy ==
Sweden

- Championship final – IK Sirius 3-2 Västerås SK

== Baseball ==
World Series

- 4–8 October — New York Giants (NL) defeats New York Yankees (AL) to win the 1922 World Series by 4 games to 0 with one tie

Negro leagues

- The Chicago American Giants win their third consecutive Negro National League pennant.

== Boxing ==
Events

- 10 July — Joe Lynch regains the World Bantamweight Championship when he defeats Johnny Buff with a 14th-round technical knockout in New York
- 24 September — Battling Siki captures the World Light Heavyweight Championship when he knocks out Georges Carpentier in the 6th round in Paris.
- 1 November — Mickey Walker, one of the greatest boxing champions, wins his first world title when he defeats World Welterweight Champion Jack Britton over 15 rounds in New York

Lineal world champions

- World Heavyweight Championship – Jack Dempsey
- World Light Heavyweight Championship – Georges Carpentier → Battling Siki
- World Middleweight Championship – Johnny Wilson
- World Welterweight Championship – Jack Britton → Mickey Walker
- World Lightweight Championship – Benny Leonard
- World Featherweight Championship – Johnny Kilbane
- World Bantamweight Championship – Johnny Buff → Joe Lynch
- World Flyweight Championship – Jimmy Wilde

== Canadian football ==
Grey Cup

- 10th Grey Cup in the Canadian Football League – Queen's University 13–1 Edmonton Elks

== Cricket ==
Events

- Yorkshire recovers the County Championship to begin a run of four successive titles.

England

- County Championship – Yorkshire
- Minor Counties Championship – Buckinghamshire
- Most runs – Jack Russell 2575 @ 54.78 (HS 172)
- Most wickets – Charlie Parker 206 @ 13.16 (BB 9–36)
- Wisden Cricketers of the Year – Arthur Carr, Tich Freeman, Charlie Parker, Jack Russell, Andy Sandham

Australia

- Sheffield Shield – Victoria
- Most runs – Frank O'Keeffe 708 @ 118.00 (HS 180)
- Most wickets – Ted McDonald 28 @ 21.50 (BB 8–84)

India

- Bombay Quadrangular – Europeans

New Zealand

- Plunket Shield – Auckland

South Africa

- Currie Cup – Transvaal

West Indies

- Inter-Colonial Tournament – Barbados

== Cycling ==
Tour de France

- Firmin Lambot (Belgium) wins the 16th Tour de France

Events

- 17 September — Dutch cyclist Piet Moeskops becomes World Champion in the UCI Track Cycling World Championships - Men's Sprint.

== Figure skating ==
World Figure Skating Championships

- World Men's Champion – Gillis Grafström (Sweden)
- World Women's Champion – Herma Szabo (Austria)
- World Pairs Champions – Helene Engelmann and Alfred Berger (Austria)

== Golf ==
Major tournaments

- British Open – Walter Hagen
- US Open – Gene Sarazen
- USPGA Championship – Gene Sarazen

Other tournaments

- British Amateur – Ernest Holderness
- US Amateur – Jess Sweetser

== Horse racing ==
England

- Grand National – Music Hall
- 1,000 Guineas Stakes – Silver Urn
- 2,000 Guineas Stakes – St Louis
- The Derby – Captain Cuttle
- The Oaks – Pogrom
- St. Leger Stakes – Royal Lancer

Australia

- Melbourne Cup – King Ingoda

Canada

- King's Plate – South Shore

France

- Prix de l'Arc de Triomphe – Ksar (second successive victory)

Ireland

- Irish Grand National – Halston
- Irish Derby Stakes – Spike Island

USA

- Kentucky Derby – Morvich
- Preakness Stakes – Pillory
- Belmont Stakes – Pillory

== Ice hockey ==
Stanley Cup

- 17–28 March — Toronto St. Pats defeats Vancouver Millionaires in the 1922 Stanley Cup Finals by 3 games to 2

== Rowing ==
The Boat Race

- 1 April — Cambridge wins the 74th Oxford and Cambridge Boat Race

== Rugby league ==
- 1921–22 Kangaroo tour of Great Britain

England

- Championship – Wigan
- Challenge Cup final – Rochdale Hornets 10–9 Hull F.C. at Headingley Rugby Stadium, Leeds
- Lancashire League Championship – Oldham
- Yorkshire League Championship – Huddersfield
- Lancashire County Cup – Warrington 7–5 Oldham
- Yorkshire County Cup – Leeds 11–3 Dewsbury

Australia

- NSW Premiership – North Sydney 35–3 Glebe (grand final)

== Rugby union ==
Five Nations Championship

- 35th Five Nations Championship series is won by Wales

== Speed skating ==
Speed Skating World Championships

- Men's All-round Champion – Harald Strøm (Norway)

== Swimming ==
Events

- Johnny Weissmuller swims the 100 metres freestyle in 58.6 seconds to create a world record and break the "minute barrier"

== Tennis ==
Events

- Inaugural Australian Women's Singles Championship is held.

Australia

- Australian Men's Singles Championship – James Anderson (Australia) defeats Gerald Patterson (Australia) 6–0 3–6 3–6 6–3 6–2
- Australian Women's Singles Championship – Margaret Molesworth (Australia) defeats Esna Boyd Robertson (Australia) 6–3 10–8

England

- Wimbledon Men's Singles Championship – Gerald Patterson (Australia) defeats Randolph Lycett (Great Britain) 6–3 6–4 6–2
- Wimbledon Women's Singles Championship – Suzanne Lenglen (France) defeats Molla Bjurstedt Mallory (Norway) 6–2 6–0

France

- French Men's Singles Championship – Henri Cochet (France) defeats Jean Samazeuilh (France) 8–6 6–3 7–5
- French Women's Singles Championship – Suzanne Lenglen (France) defeats Germaine Golding (France) 6–4 6–2

USA

- American Men's Singles Championship – Bill Tilden (USA) defeats Bill Johnston (USA) 4–6 3–6 6–2 6–3 6–4
- American Women's Singles Championship – Molla Bjurstedt Mallory (Norway) defeats Helen Wills Moody (USA) 6–3 6–1

Davis Cup

- 1922 International Lawn Tennis Challenge – United States 4–1 Australasia at West Side Tennis Club (grass) New York City, United States

== Water skiing ==
Events

- Water skiing invented in Lake City, Minnesota by Ralph Samuelson
