= 1920–21 Sheffield Shield season =

Australian cricket tournament

1920–21 Sheffield Shield
- Cricket format: First-class
- Tournament format: Double round-robin
- Champions: New South Wales (15th title)
- Participants: 3
- Matches: 6
- Most runs: Warren Bardsley (New South Wales) (648)
- Most wickets: Arthur Mailey (New South Wales) (26)

The 1920–21 Sheffield Shield season was the 25th season of the Sheffield Shield, the domestic first-class cricket competition of Australia. New South Wales won the championship.

== Table ==
Team	Pld	W	L	D	Pts
New South Wales	4	3	0	1	3
Victoria	4	2	2	0	0
South Australia	4	0	3	1	-3

== Fixtures ==
29 October – 2 November 1920
Scorecard

(H) South Australia	v	Victoria
290 (63 overs); Bill Whitty 81; Warwick Armstrong 4/60 (18 overs)		639 (129.3 overs); Roy Park 152; Andrew Smith 4/103 (14.3 overs)
270 (65.4 overs); Arthur Richardson 53*; Bert Ironmonger 4/82 (22 overs)

Victoria won by an innings and 79 runs
Adelaide Oval, Adelaide
Umpires: F. J. C. Thomas and G. I. Colyer

- South Australia won the toss and elected to bat.

26 November – 1 December 1920
Scorecard

(H) Victoria	v	South Australia
310 (73 overs); Warwick Armstrong 157*; Arthur Richardson 4/66 (21 overs)		246 (66.1 overs); Lance Pellew 69; Ted McDonald 3/46 (18.1 overs)
724 (168.7 overs); Warwick Armstrong 245; Arthur Richardson 4/153 (43 overs)		403 (81.6 overs); Percy Rundell 116; Ted McDonald 6/127 (27 overs)

Victoria won by 385 runs
Melbourne Cricket Ground, Melbourne
Umpires: Bob Crockett and H. J. Alessio

- Victoria won the toss and elected to bat.

3–9 December 1920
Scorecard

(H) New South Wales	v	South Australia
802 (156.3 overs); Warren Bardsley 235; Nip Pellew 3/119 (29 overs)		191 (53.7 overs); Nip Pellew 73; Arthur Mailey 8/81 (19.7 overs)
		0/6 f/o (4 overs); Nip Pellew 3*

Match drawn
Sydney Cricket Ground, Sydney
Umpires: Alfred Jones and William Curran

- New South Wales won the toss and elected to bat.

24–29 December 1920
Scorecard

New South Wales	v	Victoria (H)
366 (82.5 overs); Warren Bardsley 125; Bert Ironmonger 4/127 (33.5 overs)		302 (93.1 overs); Roy Park 111; Arthur Mailey 6/97 (26.1 overs)
235 (55 overs); Johnny Taylor 118; Ted McDonald 5/81 (19 overs)		198 (61.3 overs); Carl Willis 43; Arthur Mailey 6/99 (23 overs)

New South Wales won by 101 runs
Melbourne Cricket Ground, Melbourne
Umpires: A. D. Reaburn and Bob Crockett

- New South Wales won the toss and elected to bat.

7–12 January 1921
Scorecard

New South Wales	v	South Australia (H)
304 (51.2 overs); Jack Gregory 130; Andrew Smith 4/71 (10.2 overs)		265 (66 overs); Nip Pellew 91; Tommy Andrews 5/89 (20 overs)
770 (137 overs); Warren Bardsley 235; Arthur Richardson 3/168 (35 overs)		171 (51.3 overs); Vic Richardson 52; Tommy Andrews 4/67 (12.3 overs)

New South Wales won by 638 runs
Adelaide Oval, Adelaide
Umpires: A. H. Kruss and F. K. Lindow

- New South Wales won the toss and elected to bat.

25–28 January 1921
Scorecard

Victoria	v	New South Wales (H)
176 (42.1 overs); Jack Ryder 64; Jack Gregory 4/61 (13 overs)		433 (86.4 overs); Herbie Collins 146; Arthur Liddicut 4/50 (12.4 overs)
331 (73.6 overs); Jack Ryder 135*; Arthur Mailey 4/86 (17.6 overs)		4/75 (21.3 overs); Frank O'Keeffe 26; Ted McDonald 3/49 (11 overs)

New South Wales won by 6 wickets
Sydney Cricket Ground, Sydney
Umpires: Alfred Jones and William Curran

- Victoria won the toss and elected to bat.

== Statistics ==
=== Most Runs ===
Warren Bardsley 648

=== Most Wickets ===
Arthur Mailey 26

== Notable events ==
New South Wales set the record, which still stands, for the highest second innings total by a team in a first-class match, when scoring 770 against South Australia at Adelaide in January 1921. As well as this total, South Australia conceded innings totals of 639, 724 and 802 in their three other matches.
