= Later cricket career of Jack Hobbs =

English professional cricketer

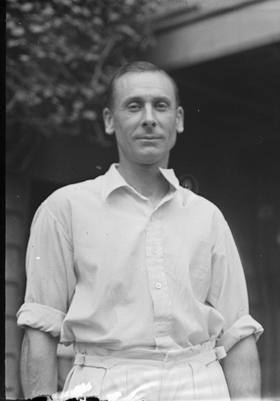
A portrait of Hobbs taken in Australia in 1928

Sir John Berry "Jack" Hobbs (16 December 1882 – 21 December 1963) was an English professional cricketer who played for Surrey from 1905 to 1934 and for England in 61 Test matches between 1908 and 1930. Having established himself as the best batsman in the world before the First World War, Hobbs resumed cricket in 1919 and was immediately successful in County Cricket. He successfully toured Australia with the Marylebone Cricket Club (MCC) in 1920–21 but sustained an injury which affected his batting on that tour and in the subsequent English season. Also in that 1921 season, he fell seriously ill with appendicitis; the effects of the illness and subsequent operation affected his batting for several seasons and his stamina never fully recovered. When he returned from the illness, Hobbs was a far less attacking batsman than he had been in his earlier career, but was much more secure and assured. As a result, his performances were statistically better than before 1914 and his reputation among the public grew. Adulation for Hobbs reached its peak in 1925 when he broke W. G. Grace's record for most first-class centuries, and the following season he made a century in extremely difficult batting conditions which was instrumental in England winning the Ashes. At this time, he also established extremely effective opening partnerships—with Herbert Sutcliffe for England and Andy Sandham for Surrey.

Hobbs continued to play Test matches until 1930; another assured performance on a rain-affected pitch in 1928–29 was followed by his final Test century. However, the last years of his career were affected by injury, and he missed a lot of cricket. He announced his retirement from Tests in 1930 but continued for Surrey until 1934 and took his total of centuries to 199—although two of these were not recognised as first-class during his career.

== Career after the war ==
=== Resumption of County Cricket ===
When first-class cricket resumed in 1919, county matches were reduced to two days in a short-lived experiment that many players, including Hobbs, disliked. Hobbs, awarded a five-year contract worth £400 per year, made runs in pre-season trial games and made a good start in first-class games. However, he initially tried to be too aggressive and, according to Wisden, "he had a brief spell of comparative failure, due to a little overeagerness and overconfidence". After this, he batted consistently throughout the season, scoring a double century for Surrey against a touring Australian Imperial Forces cricket team, centuries in each of the three Gentlemen v Players matches—the only player ever to do so in one season—and 101 for the "Rest of England" against Yorkshire, the County Champions, at the end of the season. Hobbs' rescheduled benefit match, played against Kent, raised £1,670. The match ended when Hobbs and Jack Crawford scored the 95 runs required for victory in the final innings in 30 minutes; 45 minutes had been available and in most circumstances such a required rate of scoring made a draw almost inevitable. Hobbs scored 47 not out. All of the benefit money, supplemented by a £100 grant from Surrey, was given directly to Hobbs. Usually, the committee invested part of the sum on the player's behalf but they waived this practice for Hobbs. He used it to open a sports shop in London which he ran for the rest of his life. Also during the season, Hobbs first opened the batting with Andy Sandham, who succeeded to Hayward's position as Hobbs' partner. Sandham was initially unsuccessful, and Hobbs' partner later in the season was Donald Knight, but the pair later established an extremely effective opening partnership. In total that year, Hobbs scored 2,594 runs in first-class matches, more than anyone else, at an average of 60.32.

After a winter working in his shop, Hobbs' good form continued into 1920, when county matches reverted to three days' duration. He scored a century in the opening game and 215 against Middlesex, the County Champions, at the end of the season. In June, he scored four centuries in consecutive innings, followed by 70 in the next. In total, he scored 2,827 runs at 58.89. Hobbs also took five wickets for 21 runs against Warwickshire, and his 17 wickets at an average of 11.82 meant that, according to his biographer John Arlott, "to his amusement ... he was top, not only of Surrey's, but also of the national, bowling averages". After some initial hesitation owing to his concerns for his business, Hobbs accepted an invitation to tour Australia with the MCC that winter.

=== Whitewash in Australia ===
Australia dominated the five-Test series, beating England 5–0. The England players, led by Johnny Douglas, faced a strong bowling attack, featuring pace bowlers Jack Gregory and Ted McDonald, and the spinner Arthur Mailey. In addition, the bowlers proved ineffective on hard pitches and struggled to dismiss a strong Australian batting line-up. After defeat in the second Test, Frederick Toone the MCC manager, suggested Douglas should be replaced as captain by Percy Fender. Hobbs supported such a move, but other professionals in the team were less certain. Although Fender was included in the team for the remainder of the series, Douglas retained the captaincy.

Hobbs began with two centuries in the opening three first-class games, and in the first Test, had the highest score in both England innings with 49 and 59. But Australia established their dominance in this match, winning by 377 runs after totalling 581 in their second innings. In this game, Hobbs had opened with C. A. G. Russell in place of Rhodes, who was out of form. For the remainder of the series, Rhodes was restored to partner Hobbs, but they could not replicate their former successes. In the third Test, their partnership was ended by a run out for the only time in Tests, and they had only one stand worth more than 50. Nevertheless, in the second Test Hobbs scored 122 on a very difficult pitch which had been affected by rain. Wisden commented that this was "from the English point of view, the finest innings of the tour". Even so, England followed on in reply to Australia's total of 499 and lost by an innings. Hobbs also scored a century in defeat in the third Test, hitting 123 in the final innings as England failed to score 489 to win the game. Hobbs did not pass 50 again in the series; in the fourth Test, he scored 27 and 13. Then in a match against New South Wales before the final Test, he tore a muscle in his thigh. Persuaded by Douglas to play despite suffering from restricted mobility, Hobbs scored 40 and 34 in the final Test. But after one incident in the field when he struggled to chase the ball, Hobbs was jeered by some of the crowd. Both Fender and another member of the team, Rockley Wilson, wrote scathingly about the incident in their dual role as journalists covering the Tests. Later in the match, the crowd, who gave Wilson a hostile reception following his writing, loudly cheered Hobbs; in Hobbs' view, this was to make amends for the earlier mockery of his hampered fielding. Hobbs scored a total of 924 first-class runs on the tour, at an average of 51.33; In Test matches, he scored 505 runs at 50.50. Wisden noted in its review of the tour that many English batsmen failed in the Test series, and that "our batting on the big occasions fell far short of what might reasonably have been expected. Hobbs and Douglas alone were up to their form at home."

=== Illness and recovery ===
Hobbs played just five first-class matches in 1921. In his opening first-class game, Hobbs played for a team selected by businessman Lionel Robinson against the Australian touring team, which had travelled to England on the same boat as the returning MCC team. After scoring 85, he tore the same thigh muscle injured in Australia and missed the remainder of the match. The injury forced Hobbs to miss the opening two Tests against Australia, but once recovered, he immediately scored 172 against Yorkshire; with England already trailing 2–0 in the five-Test series, the selectors chose him for the third Test. In the days approaching the match, played in Leeds, Hobbs suffered from increasing stomach pain but reluctantly played. However, the pain forced him to leave the field on the first day and after a day of rest, it worsened. A prominent surgeon, Sir Berkley Moynihan, was based in Leeds and Hobbs consulted him over the pain. Moynihan diagnosed acute appendicitis and operated the same day; in the opinion of the surgeon, Hobbs would not have lived another five hours without surgery. Hobbs missed the rest of the season, and upon recovering from surgery took a family holiday.

Hobbs returned to cricket in 1922 and batted very effectively throughout the first months of the season and scored 10 first-class centuries in total. One of the centuries came in the Gentlemen v Players match at Lord's, in which Hobbs captained the Players team for the first time. But his innings of 140 was slow by his previous standards and he received some criticism in the press for his more laboured approach. Towards the end of the season, his form faded owing to the lingering effects of his illness and operation the previous year. Wisden observed that Hobbs frequently tired during longer innings in 1922 and that he often tried to get out soon after reaching three figures; this habit of giving up his innings continued throughout the remainder of his career. Hobbs himself believed that the operation reduced his stamina and that he was never as physically strong afterwards. The season also marked a turning point in his batting approach where he preferred to score more slowly and take fewer risks, in contrast to his adventurous pre-war tactics. Even so, Hobbs finished second in the national batting averages, and scored 2,552 runs at an average of 62.24, but declined an invitation to tour South Africa that winter with the MCC. Hobbs was less successful in 1923 during a wet season; he failed with the bat on many occasions and was unsuccessful in both Gentlemen v Players games. He was still struggling with the after-effects of his operation and Wisden noticed he once more tried to score too quickly early in an innings. However, against Somerset, Hobbs scored the 100th century of his first-class career, the third man to reach the landmark after Grace and Hayward. Overall, he scored 2,087 runs at 37.95.

=== Partnership with Sutcliffe ===
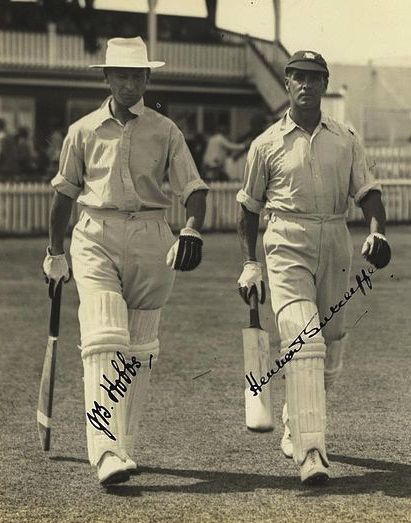
Hobbs (left) and Herbert Sutcliffe opening the batting together in Australia during 1928

Hobbs' form recovered in 1924 to the extent that Arlott described it as the beginning of "his quite phenomenal second lease of cricketing life". Batting conditions were good throughout the summer and Hobbs' opening partnership with Sandham for Surrey began to approach its peak of effectiveness. Having signed a new contract worth £440 per season, Hobbs began the season well and scored the seventh double-hundred of his career in a match against Nottinghamshire. More significantly for the future, Hobbs established an opening partnership with Herbert Sutcliffe. The pair had opened together in a festival match in 1922, in two Gentlemen v Players matches during 1923 and in a "Test trial match" played to assess potential members of the Test match team, also in 1923. The pair were chosen to open in another Test trial early in 1924, and the success of their partnership persuaded the selectors to include them in the team for the first Test against South Africa. When England batted first, Hobbs and Sutcliffe added 136 for the first wicket; Hobbs, playing a Test innings in England for the first time since 1912, scored 76. England won the match by a large margin. In the second Test, Hobbs and Sutcliffe opened with 268 runs for the first wicket. Hobbs scored quickly throughout, increasing until he was dismissed for 211, his highest Test score. At the time, the innings was the highest played at Lord's in a Test and equalled the highest in a Test match in England. England scored 531 for the loss of two wickets and won the match by an innings. Amid a growing reputation, Hobbs and Sutcliffe shared 70 in the next Test, and Hobbs then scored 118 for the Players against the Gentlemen, although he faced more criticism for slow scoring.

Hobbs was left out of the team for the fourth Test; he had declined an invitation to tour Australia with the MCC in the coming winter, and the selectors wished to try players who might tour. Hobbs' official reason for refusing a place was his uncertain health. Part of the reason, though, was the MCC's position that the wives of professionals could not accompany a touring team; when Hobbs later accepted a place on a privately organised tour of South Africa, on which his wife would accompany him, the MCC and its treasurer, Lord Harris, agreed to change their rules and approached Hobbs again to offer him and his wife a place. He agreed to tour, but only as an extra player so that no other professional was deprived of his place. With the matter concluded, Hobbs returned to the England team for the fifth Test and scored 30. In the series, he scored 355 runs at an average of 71.00, while in all first-class matches he totalled 2,094 runs at 58.16. He finished second in the national averages, and the cricket press noted that, although Hobbs scored more slowly and in less spectacular fashion than previously, he batted in a safer, more secure style which was more successful in terms of run-scoring. R. C. Robertson-Glasgow also noted that Hobbs had transformed his technique to suit the modern style of batting with the batsman's weight on the back foot.

=== Fourth tour of Australia ===
The MCC team which toured Australia in 1924–25 was captained by Arthur Gilligan. Australia won the Test series 4–1, but critics thought the winning margin flattered the host country and the English team were very popular. Much of the prestige of the team came from the batting partnership of Hobbs and Sutcliffe. Between them in the Test matches, they scored seven centuries and shared four opening partnerships which passed 100 runs. Hobbs was boosted by the presence of his wife and felt more relaxed than usual; she was also instrumental in his decision not to drink alcohol any more, taken on the outward journey.

In the opening first-class match of the tour, Hobbs and Sutcliffe opened the innings with a partnership of 89 in difficult batting conditions; Hobbs scored 50, and scored consistently in the other warm-up games. Amid great public interest, the Test series began at Sydney; in reply to Australia's first innings of 450, Hobbs and Sutcliffe opened with 157 runs. Hobbs played the Australian bowling easily and he went on to his seventh century against Australia, beating the previous record in England-Australia Tests held by Victor Trumper. Hobbs subsequently lost concentration and looked uncomfortable until he was out for 115 and the remaining England batting failed. Australia eventually set England a target of 605 runs. Hobbs and Sutcliffe shared their second century opening partnership of the game, and Hobbs scored 57, but England lost by 193 runs. During the match, Hobbs became the leading run-scorer in Test cricket, passing the previous record of 3,412 runs set by Clem Hill in 1912. In the second Test, Australia scored 600 during the opening two days. In reply, Hobbs and Sutcliffe batted throughout the third day without being separated, scoring 283. They concentrated on defence and scoring quick singles, and both men reached centuries. The press praised their achievements, and there was speculation they might beat the opening partnership record set by Hobbs and Rhodes in 1912; meanwhile, the Australian team despaired of dismissing either man. In the event, Hobbs was dismissed by an accidental full toss from Arthur Mailey, having scored 154. Once more, the remaining batsmen failed and Australia won the game by 81 runs. In the aftermath of the defeat, Cecil Parkin, a former Test bowler and vocal critic of Gilligan's captaincy, wrote a newspaper article suggesting that Hobbs should assume the leadership of the side, albeit under the nominal captaincy of Percy Chapman. This suggestion provoked a reaction from Lord Hawke: "Pray God, no professional will ever captain England". This caused a press outcry, with some writers supporting the idea of Hobbs as captain; the professionals in the MCC team protested that Hawke had been "disparaging", a reaction the Australian press described as "moderate and dignified". In reality, Hobbs had no desire to captain England and did not like leading teams.

Australia once more batted first in the third Test, scoring 489; Hobbs bowled three overs owing to injuries to other bowlers. For tactical reasons, Hobbs did not open the batting and came in at number five. He shared a partnership of 90 with Sutcliffe, who batted at number six, and Hobbs went on to score 119 through cautious batting. Wet weather altered the course of the match and left England needing 375 to win. Hobbs and Sutcliffe, opening once more, began with 63 before Hobbs was dismissed for 27. The other batsmen played well but Australia won a narrow victory by 11 runs. The opening batsmen shared their fourth century partnership of the series in the fourth Test; Hobbs scored 66 out of a total of 548 and England won by an innings. But Australia won the final match to win the series 4–1 and in a heavy defeat, Hobbs failed in both innings. In the series, Hobbs scored 573 runs at an average of 63.66. Critics in Australia and England recognised him as the best batsman in the world. Hobbs and Sutcliffe far outscored the remaining MCC batsmen and Wisden judged that with better support from other batsmen they may have won the series. The report in the almanack said: "Finer and more consistent batting than that of Hobbs and Sutcliffe in the first four Test matches could not well be conceived ... Figures do not necessarily mean a great deal, but those of Hobbs and Sutcliffe are so remarkable, especially in view of the circumstances in which they were compiled, that they demand special mention." Hobbs did not play in any other matches once the Test series began but still scored 865 first-class runs at 54.06.

== Peak of popularity ==
=== Record breaking season ===
By the middle of the 1920s, cricket in England was extremely popular and the players famous. Hobbs was the biggest attraction and a combination of his cricket earnings (estimated to be around £780 each year), the income from his business, product endorsement and ghostwritten books and articles made him relatively wealthy. According to McKinstry, his annual earnings probably reached £1,500 a year by 1925, more than a family doctor at the time.

In contrast to previous seasons following an Australian tour, Hobbs was extremely successful in 1925. Early in the season, Hobbs scored three consecutive centuries at the Oval and the press began to speculate that he may soon pass the record of 126 first-class centuries held by Grace. He continued to score a string of hundreds in away matches and by mid-June had become the first man in the season to reach 1,000 first-class runs. Against Cambridge University, Hobbs hit centuries in both innings, and followed with centuries in his next two innings to give him four in succession. Hobbs played with great freedom during this spell, and after a brief lull in his run-scoring, hit 140 in the Gentlemen v Players match at Lord's, playing a range of shots. His 12th century of the season, against Kent on 20 July, took him to 125 first-class centuries and one short of Grace's record. By now, the press and public were eagerly following Hobbs' progress in the expectation he would break the record, and great publicity surrounded his every move. Amid the pressure, and as fatigue set in, Hobbs lost form. Although he continued to make substantial scores, he could not reach a century; after one innings of 54, a newspaper headline proclaimed that "Hobbs Fails Again".

Feeling considerable anxiety, Hobbs later wrote that he was tired of the publicity which surrounded the wait for him to score his 126th century. Finally, against Somerset on 15 August, Hobbs reached the landmark, scoring 101. Having made an unsteady start, he was 91 not out after the first day's play, and betrayed great nervousness in scoring the required nine runs the next day. The achievement was widely celebrated and Hobbs received many congratulatory telegrams. Then on the final day of the match, Hobbs scored another century to become the outright record holder. Over the following weeks, Hobbs was praised and feted throughout the country. He ended his season with 266 in a Gentlemen v Players match at the Scarborough Festival, his highest to date and the best score made in the Gentlemen v Players series, and 104 for the Rest of England against Yorkshire, the County Champions. In total, he scored 16 centuries and totalled 3,024 runs at an average of 70.32, placing him on top of the national averages for the first time in his career. Wisden commented that "Hobbs will go down to posterity as one of the greatest figures in cricket history". Following the season, Hobbs gave speeches at several formal occasions, an obligation which terrified him, and several presentations in his honour. He also rejected offers to appear on stage, in film and to stand as a Liberal MP.

=== Ashes regained in 1926 ===
Hobbs was given a third benefit by the Surrey committee in 1926, with unusually generous financial guarantees given which reflected the county authorities' high opinion of him. The benefit eventually raised £2,670. Further recognition came when he, along with Wilfred Rhodes, joined the England selection committee for the season; for professional cricketers to serve as England selectors was unprecedented. The Australians toured that year and Arthur Carr was chosen to captain the England team, although Hobbs had some reservations over his leadership. Hobbs began the season well, scoring a century and several fifties in the lead-up to the Test series, although he received press criticism for the slowness of his batting in a Test trial. The first Test was badly affected by rain and there was little play. Hobbs remained in form by scoring 261 against Oxford University, sharing an opening partnership of 428 with Sandham; this remains a Surrey first wicket record in 2012. Then in the second Test, Hobbs and Sutcliffe shared an opening stand of 182. Hobbs scored 119 but was criticised for batting more slowly as his innings progressed, and some commentators accused him of selfishness—showing more concern for reaching a century than batting for the benefit of England. Although the bowling was very accurate, most critics believed Hobbs was too slow, and some suggested his approach deprived England of the opportunity to win the match; Australia batted throughout the third and final day to draw the game. The third Test was also drawn but presented difficulties for Carr and England. The composition of the team was criticised and Carr was not entirely happy with the team chosen; Hobbs accepted some responsibility for the decisions taken. Australia posted a large total and England, despite an opening partnership of 59 by Hobbs and Sutcliffe, followed on. This time the pair began with 156, Hobbs personally scored 88 and the game was saved.

During the fourth Test, Hobbs assumed the captaincy when Carr withdrew from the match owing to illness after the first day. The selectors initially asked Bert Strudwick to take over on the grounds of seniority but he declined so they turned to Hobbs. Although Hobbs expected Greville Stevens, the only amateur remaining in the team, to take over, he became the first professional to captain England at home. The selectors and players on both teams believed Hobbs performed well tactically as captain, although Carr did not approve. Hobbs scored 74 in England's innings, but heavy rain on the first day had ensured a fourth successive draw in the series.

As everything depended on the final game, the Imperial Cricket Conference agreed to a request that the match be played to a finish with time no object. The England selectors, conscious that the team had not beaten Australia in a series for 14 years, and had won just once in 19 Tests since 1920, made several changes. Carr was replaced as captain by Percy Chapman, a decision which proved enormously controversial in the press but of which Hobbs approved; Rhodes was also recalled to the team, aged 48. Amid huge public interest and excitement, the deciding match began; Hobbs and Sutcliffe shared an opening stand of 53 on the first day, but after both sides had batted once, the match was evenly balanced at the end of the second day. Overnight rain seriously damaged the pitch before the third morning; batting became extremely difficult, and few critics—including members of the England team—expected England to score many runs. Instead, Hobbs and Sutcliffe, who had scored 49 on the second evening, began to bat confidently before the effects of a hot sun drying a damp pitch made batting even more hazardous. Concentrating on careful defence, but scoring where possible, the pair added 172 in total. Arthur Richardson, a spin bowler, was expected to be the main threat, but while it often looked like Hobbs would be dismissed, he faced most of Richardson's bowling and survived. Some critics believed that, through his batting, Hobbs had deliberately exaggerated the difficulties of facing Richardson to prevent the Australian captain putting on a more difficult bowler. (Note: The idea was first put forward by former Australian captain Monty Noble, who was present at the match as a journalist. Other writers repeated the suggestion and it had become fairly widespread. Hobbs dismissed the theory and was irritated by it.) Commentators praised the skilful defence of both batsmen, Hobbs in particular. Immediately after reaching 100, Hobbs was out and received a prolonged ovation from the crowd. Many critics believed that, given the conditions, match situation and pressure, this was the greatest innings of Hobbs' career. England continued batting to build up a large lead and bowled Australia out to win the Ashes.

Late in the season, Hobbs made the highest score of his career, 316 not out for Surrey against Middlesex at Lord's, establishing a record individual innings for Lord's which survived until 1990. In total, Hobbs scored 2,949 runs at 77.60, including 12 centuries. This placed him at the head of the national batting averages.

=== Continued dominance ===
Hobbs missed a large part of the 1927 season; after beginning in good form, he missed five weeks of cricket with a skin infection. When he returned, he was left out of the Gentlemen v Players game, to his irritation as he believed he had been dropped owing to his age. He responded with a series of large scores, in which he played very aggressively, but then tore a thigh muscle. He resumed cricket at the end of the season and scored his sixth and seventh centuries of the year. He scored 1,641 runs at 52.93, but his absences led to speculation that age was catching up with Hobbs. Hobbs began the 1928 season with four centuries in the first month, but another leg injury kept him out of cricket for six weeks. When he recovered, he played in the last two of three Tests played against West Indies, playing in their first Test series. In his first game, he and Sutcliffe shared another century partnership before Hobbs was out, playing casually, for 53. In the third Test, Hobbs scored 159, having opened with a 155-run partnership with Sutcliffe. England won both matches in which Hobbs played, and won the series 3–0; Learie Constantine, the West Indian bowler, was very impressed with Hobbs' batting, but Hobbs did not consider West Indies up to international standard and did not take the series very seriously. Hobbs maintained his batting form until the end of the season. Even though many batsmen were successful that year, given very favourable batting pitches throughout the season, Hobbs finished second in the batting averages, scoring 2,542 runs at an average of 82.00 and hitting 12 centuries. Critics believed that he remained the best batsman in England.

=== Final tour to Australia ===
Hobbs was eager to tour Australia in 1928–29; his wife again accompanied him and he wished to renew acquaintance with the many good friends he had previously made there. In addition, improvements in the design of ocean liners reduced his sea-sickness. Hobbs was part of the selection committee for the tour and critics recognised the MCC team as a strong one, particularly in batting. He began the tour with some substantial scores, although some critics noted that he did not bat well, but did not make a major contribution to England's large victory in the first Test. In the second Test, Hobbs scored 40 runs and was given a presentation to mark his 46th birthday which fell during the game. He was involved in controversy over the dismissal of Australian batsman Alan Kippax; the batsman had been initially given not out, but Hobbs let a prolonged appeal to the umpire and accused Kippax of cheating. Kippax was then ruled to be out, but there was some ill-feeling between the teams for a time, particularly towards Hobbs, who later apologised to Kippax for his language.

England won the match, but some critics noticed a decline in Hobbs' batting, a judgement reinforced when he was out to a poorly-chosen shot in the first innings of the third Test for 20. Australia were able to build up a substantial lead, and overnight rain before the sixth day of the match made them likely winners according to most commentators. England were left needing 332 to win, but local observers believed that, on a pitch that was growing more and more difficult to bat on, a team would be unlikely to reach a total of 100. The ball bounced at varying heights and many of the England team regarded it as the most difficult pitch they had seen. Hobbs offered a catch when he had scored 3, but the ball was dropped. However, Hobbs and Sutcliffe survived to add 105 for the first wicket. Observers praised their technique against the turning ball; they exclusively batted using back-foot shots and only tried to score through the pull shot as other strokes presented too much risk. Even so, the Australian bowlers were criticised for their tactics. Hobbs was out for 49, an innings which Sutcliffe rated better than many centuries, and which Mason described as "altogether disproportionate in importance to its unambitious dimensions". At Hobbs' suggestion, Douglas Jardine came in to bat next, and England reached the end of the day having lost just one wicket for a score of 199. Next day, the team won the game to ensure they retained the Ashes, having a 3–0 lead in the series with two to play. Around this time, Hobbs began to openly talk about his retirement from Test matches, but after a century in a tour match, he scored 74 and shared a partnership of 143 with Sutcliffe as England won the fourth Test by 12 runs. In the final game, Hobbs, opening with Jardine as Sutcliffe was injured, scored 142 on the first day, his 12th and final Test century against Australia. Australia won the game, but lost the series 4–1. Hobbs and the press expected this to be his final Test match. In first-class games on the tour, he scored 962 runs at 56.58. and 451 runs at 50.11 in the Tests.

=== End of Test career ===
Hobbs suffered a succession of injuries and illnesses in 1929; over the previous few seasons, he missed more than a third of Surrey's matches. When he did play, he scored heavily and in total scored 2,263 runs at an average of 66.55 to lead the first-class averages. He was unfit for the first two Tests against South Africa then chose to miss the next two, leading to speculation he had retired from Test cricket. However, he felt fit enough to play in the fifth and final Test, scoring 10 and 52. Critics observed a general slowing in Hobbs' scoring throughout the season, and he scored more often in singles than in his earlier years, when he tried to hit the ball further.

Prior to the 1930 season, Hobbs made himself available for the forthcoming Ashes series. He began in good form, scoring centuries in each innings of his first game, and maintained his run-scoring in the weeks leading up to the first Test. Before the series began, Hobbs and Rhodes were added to the selection panel again. (Note: In 1930, the Ashes Tests were scheduled for four days, the first time matches were extended to that length in England.) In the first Test, Hobbs scored 78 in the first innings, one of the few English successes. After England established a lead on first innings, he scored a rapid 74; he top-scored in both innings and was praised by the press for his continued success. England won the match and Hobbs seemed to have established his ascendancy over the Australian bowling attack, which critics regarded as weak. He failed in the next Test and suggested to the selectors that he should be omitted from the team. But he played in the third Test and was controversially dismissed for 29; his sportsmanship was called into question when he refused to accept the word of the fielder who held the catch. He lingered on the pitch and only left once the umpire ruled him out; he made his displeasure clear and the crowd became unsettled. When England followed on, in reply to an Australian total of 566, Hobbs appealed against the light and was jeered by the crowd. He was later run out for 13. Feeling tired, possibly feeling under pressure by his role as a selector and concerned by his form, he once more offered to stand down but the other selectors retained him in the team. When he batted in the fourth Test, he scored slowly, determined not to be dismissed, and shared an opening partnership of 108 with Sutcliffe, their 11th century stand against Australia. After two hours batting, he was out for 31. With the series level at 1–1, the final match was to be played until there was a result, but before it began, Hobbs announced that it would be his last Test match. Shortly after making the decision, he returned to form, scoring a century and passing, in his next game, W. G. Grace's record aggregate of runs in a first-class career.

Before the deciding game, the selectors sacked Percy Chapman as captain. There was some press speculation that Hobbs would replace him, but Bob Wyatt was chosen. Hobbs supported the removal of Chapman, and there is a possibility that he was offered the captaincy at the meeting of selectors, but turned it down. (Note: The News Chronicle newspaper reported that Hobbs had declined the captaincy, and a story circulated among county cricketers that such an offer had been made. Sutcliffe later told a team-mate that he was "disappointed" that Hobbs turned it down. The chairman of selectors, Leveson-Gower, was a longtime supporter of Hobbs, which makes such a story plausible according to McKinstry.) In the match, Hobbs scored 47 in the first innings. When he came out to bat in the second, in the face of a large Australian first-innings lead, Hobbs was given an ovation by the crowd and the Australian fielders gave him three cheers. Hobbs was moved by his reception but scored only nine runs before he was dismissed. In 61 Tests, he scored 5,410 runs at an average of 56.94. He retired as the leading run-scorer in Test matches, a record he held until passed by Wally Hammond in 1937. In his final series, he scored 301 runs at 33.44. Hobbs maintained his form in other cricket until the end of the season, when he had scored 2,103 runs at 51.29, and Wisden noted that it was an achievement to score so well given his age. In September, he took a team of famous cricketers to Cambridge to play a charity match which included the official opening on Parker's Piece of the Jack Hobbs pavilion. However, an attempt by the Daily Herald to open a testimonial fund to mark his international retirement met with very little public interest, and the end of his Test career passed with little press comment.

== End of career ==
During the winter of 1930–31, Hobbs was invited to join a private team run by the Maharajkumar of Vizianagram which toured India and Ceylon. Sutcliffe joined him, and he was accompanied by his wife. Both Hobbs and Sutcliffe were extremely popular. In games which were not particularly competitive, he scored 593 runs, but these runs, and in particular the two centuries he scored were later to prove controversial. Hobbs never believed that the matches were, or should have been, first-class but statisticians later decided to recognise them as first-class. Wisden never recognised the centuries and so record his total of centuries as 197. Other authorities give 199 centuries.

Hobbs scored heavily in the 1931 season, although his batting technique had become more limited in scope and variety. He played several representative matches and took part in the 150th century opening partnership of his career. He was the first batsman in the season to reach 1,000 runs and such was his success that the press speculated he would return to the Test team. In festival matches at the end of the season, Hobbs and Sutcliffe shared two double-century opening partnerships. In total, Hobbs scored 2,418 first-class runs at 56.23. He continued to score well in 1932, although he missed several matches owing to injuries and fatigue. In total, he scored 1,764 runs at 56.90, including centuries in each innings against Essex. According to Mason, his performance against Essex caused Douglas Jardine to give him the nickname "The Master". Hobbs scored 161 not out for the Players against the Gentlemen. This was his 16th century in the fixture and beat the record number of centuries by Grace.

Hobbs was partially involved in the Bodyline controversy in Australia in 1932–33. Late in the 1932 season, Bill Bowes bowled consistently short against Hobbs in a match between Surrey and Yorkshire. Bowes was criticised in the press and particularly by Pelham Warner who was to manage the MCC team in Australia. Hobbs accompanied the team to Australia as a journalist, writing for the News Chronicle and the Star, accompanied by his ghost writer Jack Ingham. During the tour, Hobbs neither condemned Bodyline nor fully described the English tactics. Other journalists admired Hobbs but dismissed his writing as "bland". Hobbs would not criticise Jardine, at the time his county captain and felt hampered by his lack of journalistic experience. However, his criticism of Sutcliffe's slow scoring in one innings provoked a reaction from Lord Hawke back in England, who attacked Hobbs in a public speech. Late in the tour, Hobbs played in one match for the touring team, scoring 44 in a minor matches when several players were rested or injured. When he returned to England, Hobbs openly criticised Bodyline bowling, in newspaper columns and in a book.

In 1933, Hobbs scored 1,105 runs at 61.38, aged 50. After missing the first games with illness, he scored 221 against the touring West Indian team, which earned many tributes in the press. He did not play every game, and the Surrey committee allowed him to choose which matches to play, and more centuries later in the season led to press anticipation of his 200th century—although the matches for Vizianagram's team were not counted as first-class at the time. By the end of the season, he had scored 196 first-class centuries. That winter he accompanied the MCC team in India as a journalist, and before the next season, Surrey had constructed a new entrance to the Oval which was named after Hobbs. After a solid start to the 1934 season, Hobbs scored his final first-class century against Lancashire. Afterwards, his form collapsed. Playing irregularly, his batting began to appear uncomfortable. His remaining innings were a struggle and both Hobbs and his team-mates realised that his career was over. In February 1935, he announced his retirement. In his final season, he scored 624 runs at 36.70. There were many tributes and a public dinner was held in his honour in 1935 which was attended by many leading figures in cricket. In all first-class cricket, Hobbs scored 61,760 runs at an average of 50.70 according to ESPNCricinfo.

== Bibliography ==
- Arlott, John (1981). Jack Hobbs: Profile of "The Master". London: John Murray/David-Poynter. ISBN 0-7195-3886-6.
- Birley, Derek (1999). A Social History of English Cricket. London: Aurum Press. ISBN 1-85410-941-3.
- Green, Benny, ed. (1982). Wisden Anthology 1900–1940. London: Queen Anne Press. ISBN 0-7472-0706-2.
- Mason, Ronald (1960). Jack Hobbs: A Portrait of an Artist as a Great Batsman. London: Hollis & Carter.
- McKinstry, Leo (2011). Jack Hobbs: England's Greatest Cricketer. London: Yellow Jersey Press. ISBN 978-0-224-08329-4.
