= 1922–23 Sheffield Shield season =

Australian cricket tournament

1922–23 Sheffield Shield
- Cricket format: First-class
- Tournament format: Double round-robin
- Champions: New South Wales (16th title)
- Participants: 3
- Matches: 6
- Most runs: Bill Woodfull (Victoria) (514)
- Most wickets: Arthur Mailey (New South Wales) (30)

The 1922–23 Sheffield Shield season was the 27th season of the Sheffield Shield, the domestic first-class cricket competition of Australia. New South Wales won the championship by virtue of having a better average.

== Table ==
Team	Pld	W	L	D	Pts
New South Wales	4	3	1	0	2
Victoria	4	3	1	0	2
South Australia	4	0	4	0	-4

== Fixtures ==
15–20 December 1922
Scorecard

New South Wales	v	South Australia (H)
786 (128.4 overs); Alan Kippax 170; Norman Williams 4/206 (25.4 overs)		274 (77.6 overs); Arthur Richardson 60*; Sam Everett 6/59 (20.6 overs)
		202 f/o (51.4 overs); Norman Williams 51*; Arthur Mailey 6/77 (20 overs)

New South Wales won by an innings and 310 runs
Adelaide Oval, Adelaide
Umpires: C. R. O'Connor and T. W. Cook

- New South Wales won the toss and elected to bat.

23–27 December 1922
Scorecard

New South Wales	v	Victoria (H)
160 (35.6 overs); Alan Kippax 68; Arthur Liddicut 4/56 (13 overs)		125 (49.6 overs); Bill Woodfull 47; Charlie Macartney 5/8 (5.6 overs)
142 (47.2 overs); Herbie Collins 29; Arthur Liddicut 4/39 (17 overs)		3/178 (74.2 overs); Bill Woodfull 84*; Paddy Gray 2/58 (19 overs)

Victoria won by 7 wickets
Melbourne Cricket Ground, Melbourne
Umpires: Bob Crockett and Clement Garing

- Victoria won the toss and elected to field.

30 December 1922 – 4 January 1923
Scorecard

(H) Victoria	v	South Australia
328 (78.1 overs); Albert Hartkopf 98; Bill Whitty 5/82 (28 overs)		257 (69 overs); Vic Richardson 50; Arthur Liddicut 3/31 (11 overs)
287 (71.3 overs); Bill Woodfull 115; Norman Williams 4/111 (20.3 overs)		90 (25.3 overs); Vic Richardson 34; Albert Hartkopf 5/24 (8.3 overs)

Victoria won by 268 runs
Melbourne Cricket Ground, Melbourne
Umpires: Bob Crockett and Dave Elder

- Victoria won the toss and elected to bat.

6–10 January 1923
Scorecard

(H) New South Wales	v	South Australia
486 (85.4 overs); Tommy Andrews 179; Bill Whitty 3/97 (24.4 overs)		198 (52.5 overs); Percy Rundell 56; John Scott 4/46 (13 overs)
1/99 (25.3 overs); Warren Bardsley 55*; Bill Whitty 1/46 (13 overs)		386 f/o (83.6 overs); Arthur Richardson 155; Arthur Mailey 6/128 (30 overs)

New South Wales won by 9 wickets
Sydney Cricket Ground, Sydney
Umpires: A. H. Farrow and Alfred Williams

- New South Wales won the toss and elected to bat.

26–30 January 1923
Scorecard

Victoria	v	New South Wales (H)
353 (81.2 overs); Jack Ryder 71; John Scott 3/83 (22 overs)		560 (119.2 overs); Alan Kippax 197; Jack Ryder 3/103 (28 overs)
179 (51.4 overs); Vernon Ransford 36; Arthur Mailey 5/73 (18.4 overs)

New South Waves won by an innings and 28 runs
Sydney Cricket Ground, Sydney
Umpires: Alfred Jones and Walter French

- Victoria won the toss and elected to bat.

16–20 February 1923
Scorecard

(H) South Australia	v	Victoria
275 (58.3 overs); Vic Richardson 95; Albert Hartkopf 4/105 (17 overs)		386 (95.5 overs); Bill Woodfull 123; Bill Whitty 3/72 (25 overs)
303 (63.2 overs); Jack Murray 152; Tom Carlton 5/67 (17 overs)		3/193 (37.5 overs); Bill Woodfull 94*; Harry Fisher 2/31 (8 overs)

Victoria won by 7 wickets
Adelaide Oval, Adelaide
Umpires: George Hele and T. W. Cook

- South Australia won the toss and elected to bat.

== Statistics ==
=== Most Runs ===
Bill Woodfull 514

=== Most Wickets ===
Arthur Mailey 30
