= Australian cricket team in England in 1921 =

International cricket tour

Australia won the 1921 Ashes series held in England. They won the first three matches against England, which meant that they had won eight in succession, an unequalled sequence in Ashes Tests, following the 5–0 drubbing they had administered to England in the 1920–21 season in Australia. The last two matches of the Test series were drawn. England chose 30 different players across the five Tests — still the record for the most players used by one side in a series.

In addition to the Test matches, the Australian team played first-class matches against all the major teams in England, plus some less important matches. In all, they played 38 matches, winning 22 of them, drawing 14 and losing just twice towards the end of the season.

== The touring party ==
- Warwick Armstrong, captain
- Tommy Andrews
- Warren Bardsley
- Hanson Carter
- Herbie Collins
- Jack Gregory
- Hunter Hendry
- Charlie Macartney
- Ted McDonald
- Arthur Mailey
- Edgar Mayne
- Bert Oldfield
- Nip Pellew
- Jack Ryder
- Johnny Taylor

== Test series summary ==
=== First Test ===
28–30 May 1921
(3-day match)
Scorecard

England	v	Australia
112 (37 overs); P Holmes 30; JM Gregory 6/58 (19 overs)		232 (78 overs); W Bardsley 66; FE Woolley 3/46 (22 overs)
147 (85.4 overs); DJ Knight 38; EA McDonald 5/32 (22.4 overs)		30/0 (6.1 overs); CG Macartney 22*

Australia won by 10 wickets
Trent Bridge, Nottingham
Umpires: HR Butt and J Moss

- England won the toss and elected to bat.
- 29 May was taken as a rest day.
- The match was scheduled for three days but completed in two.
- DJ Knight, P Holmes, GE Tyldesley, VWC Jupp and TL Richmond (all ENG), and TJE Andrews and HSTL Hendry (both AUS) made their Test debuts.

=== Second Test ===
11–14 June 1921
(3-day match)
Scorecard

England	v	Australia
187 (68.2 overs); FE Woolley 95; AA Mailey 4/55 (14.2 overs)		342 (84.1 overs); W Bardsley 88; FJ Durston 4/102 (24.1 overs)
283 (90.2 overs); FE Woolley 93; JM Gregory 4/76 (26.2 overs)		131/2 (30.3 overs); W Bardsley 63*; CH Parkin 1/31 (9 overs)

Australia won by 8 wickets
Lord's, London
Umpires: J Moss and W Phillips

- England won the toss and elected to bat.
- 12 June was taken as a rest day.
- AE Dipper, AJ Evans, NE Haig and FJ Durston (all ENG) made their Test debuts.

=== Third Test ===
2–5 July 1921
(3-day match)
Scorecard

Australia	v	England
407 (93.1 overs); CG Macartney 115; CH Parkin 4/106 (20.1 overs)		259 (93.1 overs); JWHT Douglas 75; EA McDonald 4/105 (26.1 overs)
273/7d (73 overs); TJE Andrews 92; JC White 3/37 (11 overs)		202 (52.2 overs); G Brown 46; AA Mailey 3/71 (20.2 overs)

Australia won by 219 runs
Headingley, Leeds
Umpires: HR Butt and A Millward

- Australia won the toss and elected to bat.
- 3 July was taken as a rest day.
- HTW Hardinge, A Ducat, G Brown and JC White (all ENG) made their Test debuts.

=== Fourth Test ===
23–26 July 1921
(3-day match)
Scorecard

England	v	Australia
362/4d (120 overs); CAG Russell 101; WW Armstrong 2/57 (33 overs)		175 (116.4 overs); HL Collins 40; CH Parkin 5/38 (29.4 overs)
44/1 (13 overs); CH Parkin 23; TJE Andrews 1/23 (5 overs)

Match drawn
Old Trafford, Manchester
Umpires: J Moss and AE Street

- England won the toss and elected to bat.
- There was no play on the first day.
- 24 July was taken as a rest day.
- C Hallows and CWL Parker (both ENG) made their Test debuts.

=== Fifth Test ===
13–16 August 1921
(3-day match)
Scorecard

England	v	Australia
403/8d (127 overs); CP Mead 182*; EA McDonald 5/143 (47 overs)		389 (102 overs); TJE Andrews 94; CH Parkin 3/82 (23 overs)
244/2 (58 overs); CAG Russell 102*; JM Taylor 1/25 (7 overs)

Match drawn
The Oval, London
Umpires: J Moss and W Phillips

- England won the toss and elected to bat.
- 14 August was taken as a rest day.
- A Sandham (ENG) made his Test debut.

== Aftermath ==
The tour made a profit of more than £17,000 for the Australian Cricket Board, enabling them to recoup all the losses from the previous tour in 1912, and to pay a £300 bonus to each of the 15 players and the manager.

== Annual reviews ==
- Wisden Cricketers' Almanack 1922
