= Edward Freeman =

Edward Freeman may refer to:

- Edward Augustus Freeman (1823–1892), English historian
- Edward Monroe Freeman (1875–1954), American botanist
- Edward Freeman (cricketer, born 1848) (1848–1905), Australian cricketer
- Edward Freeman (cricketer, born 1860) (1860–1939), English cricketer
- Edward Freeman (cricketer, born 1880) (1880–1964), English cricketer
- R. Edward Freeman (born 1951), modern American business professor, economist and ethicist
- Ed Freeman (1927–2008), U.S. Army pilot and Medal of Honor recipient
- Eddie Freeman (gridiron football) (born 1978), American player of American and Canadian football
- Eddie Freeman (musician) (1909–1987), English jazz musician
- Ted Freeman (politician) (1900–1986), politician in Ontario, Canada
