= Cranney =

Cranney is a surname. Notable people with the surname include:

- Martin Cranney (1795–1870), Irish-born Canadian politician
- Mudgee Cranney (1886–1971), Australian cricketer
- Sean Cranney (born 1973), Australian former association football player

== See also ==
- Craney
- Cranny (disambiguation)
