= Douglas Freeman =

English cricketer

Personal information
- Full name: Douglas Percy Freeman
- Born: 21 July 1916; Sherborne, Dorset
- Died: 3 April 2013 (aged 96); Westbury on Trym, Bristol
- Batting: Left-handed
- Relatives: Edward Freeman (father); Edward Freeman (grandfather); Thomas Russell (great-uncle); Tich Freeman (uncle)

Domestic team information
- Years: Team
- 1934–1948: Dorset
- 1937: Kent

Career statistics
Competition	First-class
Matches	1
Runs scored	10
Batting average	5.00
100s/50s	0/0
Top score	6
Catches/stumpings	0/–
- Source: CricInfo, 30 May 2011

Douglas Percy Freeman MBE (21 July 1916 – 3 April 2013) was an English cricketer. Freeman was a left-handed batsman who played for Dorset County Cricket Club and Kent County Cricket Club. He was born at Sherborne in Dorset in 1916.

Freeman made his debut for Dorset in the 1934 Minor Counties Championship against Cornwall. He played Minor counties cricket for Dorset from 1934 to 1948, making 32 Minor Counties Championship appearances for the county with a highest score of 89 runs, made in 1935 against Devon.

After playing for Kent Second XI in 1936, Freeman made eight appearances for the county Second XI in the 1937 Minor Counties Championship and played in one first-class cricket match against Somerset in the 1937 County Championship. He made a total of ten runs in the match in a "crushing defeat" for the county. He played for Somerset Second XI in 1939 before returning to play for Dorset after the Second World War.

Freeman's father, Edward, his grandfather, also called Edward, and his great-uncle Thomas Russell, all played first-class cricket and his brother, another Edward, also played for Dorset. His uncle was Tich Freeman who played for Kent between 1914 and 1936 and is the county's leading wicket-taker. When Freeman died at the age of 96 in 2013 at Westbury on Trym in Bristol he was Kent's oldest surviving player and the last surviving player who had played for the county before World War II.

== Bibliography ==
- Carlaw, Derek (2020). Kent County Cricketers, A to Z: Part Two (1919–1939) (PDF). Cardiff: ACS.
