= Cranny (disambiguation) =

Cranny is a village in County Clare, Ireland.

Cranny may also refer to:

- Elise Cranny (born 1966), American runner
- Richie Cranny (born 1971), Australian MMA coach
- Robert F. Cranny (born 1981), songwriter and record producer in Sydney, Australia

== See also ==
- Cranney, a surname
