= Wimp 2 Warrior =

Mixed martial arts training program

- Genre: Mixed Martial Arts
- Created by: Richie Cranny
- Starring: Jens Pulver, Ortenzia Borre
- Country of origin: Australia
- Original language: English
- No. of episodes: 7

Original release
- Network: YouTube
- Release: April 2013 – May 2014

Wimp 2 Warrior is a Mixed Martial Arts training program created by Richie Cranny to showcase the sport of Mixed Martial Arts (MMA) to a mainstream audience. The training program transforms everyday individuals or 'wimps' (with little or no combat sports training) into 'warriors' (who will potentially fight on the finale against another contestant). Billed as 'The Ultimate Human Experiment' the Australian-based program has exploded in popularity in the past couple of years with big-name gyms such as SBG Dublin under John Kavanagh, American Kickboxing Academy in San Jose and Tristar gym in Montreal now running the program.

In January 2022 Wimp 2 Warrior re-branded to the name Alta. The 20 week warrior training program remains as the core MMA training offering of Alta.In addition to the rebrand, the Alta Warrior training program introduced new Global Ambassador Daniel Cormier who also began offering the 20 week warrior training program at his training academy in Gilroy California.

== W2W 20 week MMA training program ==
Since 2012, the TV show format has been made available to everyday men and women who are looking to step outside their comfort zone and see a transformational change, both physically and mentally.

With no prior MMA experience or fitness required, competitors are taken through an intense 20 week training program and fight camp, learning skills in Brazilian Jiu-Jitsu, Muay Thai, Kickboxing and Boxing. At the completion of the program, they have the opportunity to step inside the octagon to compete in their first amateur MMA contest.

As of May 2020, the W2W program is available in over 60 gyms in 8 countries around the world.

== Series 1 (Pilot) ==
The first series of Wimp 2 Warrior was released via YouTube and the Wimp 2 Warrior website. After six months of training, the finale was held at Norths Leagues Club, Cammeray, Sydney, in April 2013. Seven episodes were produced - the first six focussed on the selection and training phases, and the seventh episode was a multi camera coverage of the finale "fight night", featuring 8 MMA contests with amateur MMA rules.

Guest coaches featured on series 1 include Mark Hunt, Royce Gracie, Peter Graham (fighter) and current UFC referee John Sharp.

Series 1 was produced by Sydney-based production company Damn Good Productions. Production took place from early 2012 through to April 2013, and episodes were broadcast weekly, starting Sunday 21 April and concluding Sunday 2 June 2013. Episodes were released on YouTube each week at 7pm AEST, and were made available on-demand after that. The series was directed by Ben Alcott, voiced by John Meillon Jnr, and produced by John Hollands.

The first series is currently available for free viewing on the Wimp 2 Warrior website and via ninemsn's MMA Kanvas.

== Series 2 ==
Beginning in January 2014, 40 men and women were selected to complete the 6 month fight camp and fought on a designated amateur card in June, held at the Luna Park Big Top, Sydney, in front of approximately 1800 spectators. The show featured fight legends and stars such as Jens Pulver and a selection of other renowned names. Hosted by television personality Ortenzia Borre the series again features UFC fighters and combat sports world champions as guest coaches and mentors. The finale was the largest local MMA event in Australian history.

Series 2 was produced by Showrunner Productions, the official Series 2 trailer was released in May, 2014 and the series was later aired on Fox Sports 1 in Australia.

== Coaches ==
Richie Cranny (Head Coach/MMA), Jens Pulver, Rachel Guy (Strength and Conditioning)
