= Craney =

Craney is a surname. Notable people with the surname include:

- Ed Craney (1905–1991), American radio and TV executive
- Heather Craney (born 1971), English actress
- Ian Craney (born 1982), English footballer
- Mark Craney (1952–2005), drummer for the rock band Jethro Tull

== See also ==
- Craney Island (disambiguation)
- Battle of Craney Island, victory for the United States during the War of 1812
- Craney Island Light, screwpile lighthouse, located just east of Craney Island, Virginia
- Carney (disambiguation)
- Cranae
- Crancey
- Cransley
