= Frank Lucas (cricketer) =

Australian cricketer

Personal information
- Born: 9 November 1888; Port Pirie, Australia
- Died: 31 August 1941 (aged 52); Adelaide, Australia
- Source: Cricinfo, 12 August 2020

Frank Lucas (9 November 1888 – 31 August 1941) was an Australian cricketer. He played in three first-class matches for South Australia in 1919/20.

== See also ==
- List of South Australian representative cricketers
