= 1922 Kentucky Derby =

Horse race

48th Kentucky Derby
- Kentucky Derby
- Grade I stakes race
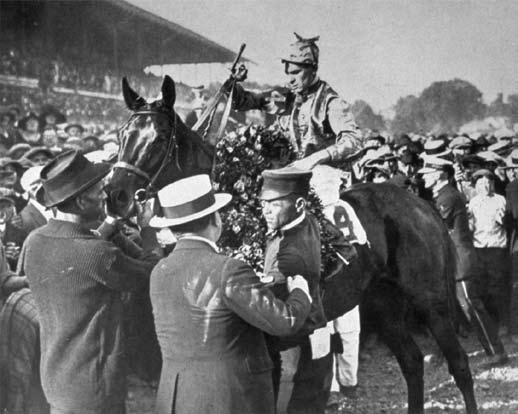
- Morvich after winning the 1922 Kentucky Derby
- Location: Churchill Downs
- Date: May 13, 1922
- Winning horse: Morvich
- Jockey: Albert Johnson
- Trainer: Fred Burlew
- Owner: Benjamin Block
- Surface: Dirt

The 1922 Kentucky Derby was the 48th running of the Kentucky Derby. The race took place on May 13, 1922.

== Full results ==
Finished	Post	Horse	Jockey	Trainer	Owner	Time / behind
1st	4	Morvich	Albert Johnson	Fred Burlew	Benjamin Block	2:04.60
2nd	7	Bet Mosie	Henry Burke	Herbert J. Thompson	Edward R. Bradley	1 1/2
3rd	1	John Finn	Earl Pool	William Perkins	George F. Baker	Head
4th	6	Deadlock	J. D. Mooney	Robert H. Shannon	Robert H. Shannon	1
5th	3	My Play	Clifford Robinson	Roy J. Waldron	Lexington Stable (Edward F. Simms & Henry W. Oliver	4
6th	9	Letterman	Ted Rice	Mose Goldblatt	Greentree Stable	4
7th	8	Surf Rider	Edward Scobie	Kay Spence	Montfort Jones	1
8th	2	Startle	Danny Connelly	John I. Smith	Herbert H. Hewitt	1/2
9th	10	By Gosh	Edgar Barnes	William A. Hurley	Edward R. Bradley	Neck
10th	5	Busy American	Newton Barrett	Herbert J. Thompson	Edward R. Bradley	DNF

- Winning Breeder: Adolph B. Spreckels; (CA)
- Horse Banker Brown scratched before the race.

== Payout ==
Post	Horse	Win	Place	Show
4	Morvich	$ 4.40	4.30	3.50
7	Bet Mosie		2.90	2.70
1	John Finn			6.60

- The winner received a purse of $53,775.
- Second place received $6,000.
- Third place received $3,000.
- Fourth place received $1,000.
