= Donald Knight (cricketer) =

English cricketer

Personal information
- Full name: Donald John Knight
- Born: 12 May 1894; Sutton, Surrey, England
- Died: 5 January 1960 (aged 65); London, England
- Batting: Right-handed

International information
- National side: England

Domestic team information
- Years: Team
- 1911 to 1937: Surrey
- 1914 to 1919: Oxford University

Career statistics
Competition	Tests	First-class
Matches	2	139
Runs scored	54	6,231
Batting average	13.50	30.84
100s/50s	0/0	13/30
Top score	38	156*
Balls bowled	–	52
Wickets	–	3
Bowling average	–	8.33
5 wickets in innings	–	0
10 wickets in match	–	0
Best bowling	–	2/0
Catches/stumpings	1/–	74/–
- Source: Cricinfo, 27 September 2019

Donald John Knight (12 May 1894 – 5 January 1960) was an amateur cricketer who played first-class cricket for Surrey, Oxford University and England between 1911 and 1937.

A stylish opening batsman, Knight first played for Surrey in 1911 while he was still a schoolboy at Malvern College, and won a Blue while studying at Trinity College, Oxford, either side of the First World War. He was a Wisden Cricketer of the Year in 1915. His great season was 1919 when, after completing his university studies, he opened regularly for Surrey with Jack Hobbs and scored 1,588 runs at an average of more than 45 runs per innings, with seven centuries. That season, R. C. Robertson-Glasgow wrote, "people went to The Oval to see Hobbs and Knight open the Surrey innings. Many then did not know, or care to ask, which was which, satisfied to watch the joint approach to perfection."

In a county match at Hastings in 1920, Knight was struck on the head while fielding and was never quite the same batsman again. In 1921 he was picked for two Test matches against the all-conquering Australians but scored only 54 runs in four innings. In the First Test his 38 in the second innings was England's highest score in the match.

In 1920, Knight became a teacher at Westminster School, where he was master in charge of cricket for many years. After the 1921 season he appeared only occasionally for Surrey, mostly in the summer holidays, retiring after playing 12 games in 1937.
