= Edward Phillips (cricketer, born 1892) =

Australian cricketer

Personal information
- Born: 2 September 1892; Adelaide, Australia
- Died: 8 January 1971 (aged 78)
- Source: Cricinfo, 18 September 2020

Edward Phillips (2 September 1892 – 8 January 1971) was an Australian cricketer. He played in three first-class matches for South Australia between 1919 and 1921.

== See also ==
- List of South Australian representative cricketers
