= Craney Island =

Craney Island may refer to:

- Craney Island (Virginia)
- Harkers Island, North Carolina, formerly known as Craney Island
- Craney Island (Maryland) in Charles County, Maryland
