= Lyall Wall =

Australian cricketer and rugby league footballer (1891-1969)

Personal information
- Full name: John Craik Lyall Sydney Wall
- Born: 25 October 1891 Birchgrove, New South Wales, Australia
- Died: 9 June 1969 (aged 77) West Pymble, New South Wales, Australia

Playing information
- Position: Centre, Fullback, Wing
Club
Years	Team	Pld	T	G	FG	P
1912–13	Balmain	19	2	14	1	36
1913	Annandale	9	2	15	3	42
1914–19	Balmain	67	4	23	6	70
1920	Western Suburbs	14	3	26	1	63
1921	St George	8	0	24	0	48
	Total	117	11	102	11	259
Representative
Years	Team	Pld	T	G	FG	P
1919	New South Wales	4	1	0	0	3
1914–15	Metropolis	2	0	0	0	0

John Craik Lyall Sydney Wall (25 October 1891 - 9 June 1969) was an Australian cricketer and rugby league footballer who represented New South Wales in both sports.

Lyall Wall played for Balmain for 8 years, one year with Annandale followed by a return to Balmain.

== Career ==
Wall made his first grade rugby league debut with Balmain Tigers in 1912, had a brief season at Annandale in 1913 before returning to the Tigers until the end of season 1919. Lyall played fullback and centre throughout his league career, and was also a prolific goal kicker. By 1920, he left the Balmain district and turned out for the Western Suburbs Magpies for one season.

A long-standing friendship with Herb Gilbert brought him to the St. George Dragons for the club's debut season in 1921, and played centre, wing and fullback for the Dragon's in their debut year. As established players, Lyall Wall, George Carstairs, Herb Gilbert and Reg Fusedale all brought much needed experience to the St. George Dragons club in its foundation year.

Wall represented the New South Wales rugby league team on four occasions during 1919.

As a cricketer, Wall played 11 first-class matches for New South Wales between 1914/15 and 1924/25.
