= Harry Fisher (cricketer) =

Australian cricketer

Harry Medcalf Fisher
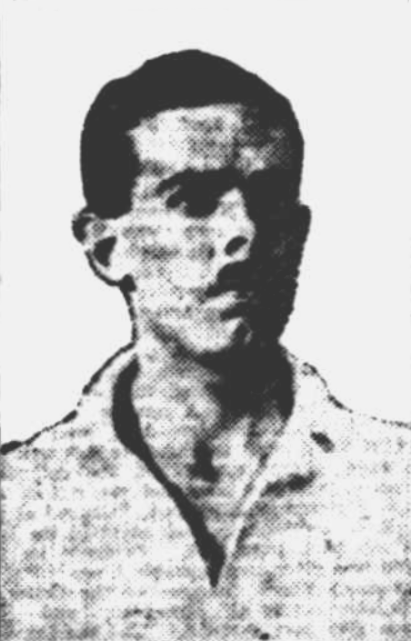

Personal information
- Born: 28 May 1899; Adelaide, South Australia
- Died: 14 October 1982 (aged 83); Launceston, Tasmania
- Source: Cricinfo, 11 December 2018

Harry Medcalf Fisher (28 May 1899 – 14 October 1982) was an Australian cricketer. He was born at 151 Buxton Street, North Adelaide to the wife of Harry Gilbert Fisher.

He was educated at St Peter's College and studied medicine at Adelaide University, where he was a prominent member of the cricket team, amongst other sports, notably rifle shooting and lacrosse. He completed his medical degree in 1922.

He played eight first-class matches for South Australia between 1920 and 1924.

He married in 1931 and served as Tutor in Obstetrics at the university from 1932 to 1939.

He served with the Australian Army Medical Corps, and was appointed OBE in 1946.

== See also ==
- List of South Australian representative cricketers
