= James Bogle (cricketer) =

Australian cricketer

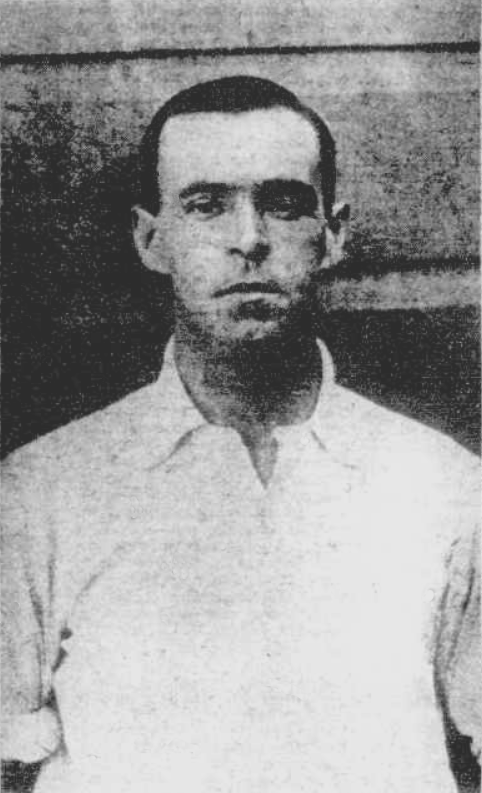

Personal information
- Born: 4 January 1893; Sydney, Australia
- Died: 19 October 1963 (aged 70); Southport, Queensland, Australia
- Source: ESPNcricinfo, 23 December 2016

James Bogle (4 January 1893 – 19 October 1963) was an Australian cricketer. He played fifteen first-class matches for New South Wales between 1918/19 and 1920/21.

== See also ==
- List of New South Wales representative cricketers
