= Leonard Mullett =

Australian cricketer

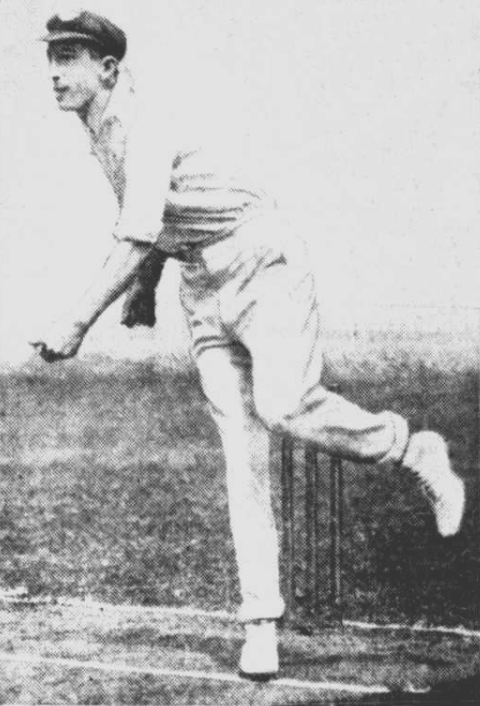

Personal information
- Born: 27 November 1894; Moonee Ponds, Victoria, Australia
- Died: 22 April 1944 (aged 49); Melbourne, Australia

Domestic team information
- Years: Team
- 1920-1929: Victoria
- Source: Cricinfo, 19 November 2015

Leonard Mullett (27 November 1894 – 22 April 1944) was an Australian cricketer. He played six first-class cricket matches for Victoria between 1920 and 1929. He was a slow-medium bowler who spun the ball a little and a tailend batsman.

Mullett began his cricket career by playing for Scotch College before joining the Melbourne Club in the Victorian grade cricket competition in 1910. He also represented Melbourne in baseball and became a leading pitcher. After WWI ended Mullett played for Essendon until the mid 1930s. He also represented Victoria in first-class cricket with less success than his club career.

== See also ==
- List of Victoria first-class cricketers
