= Sam Everett =

Australian cricketer (1901–1970)

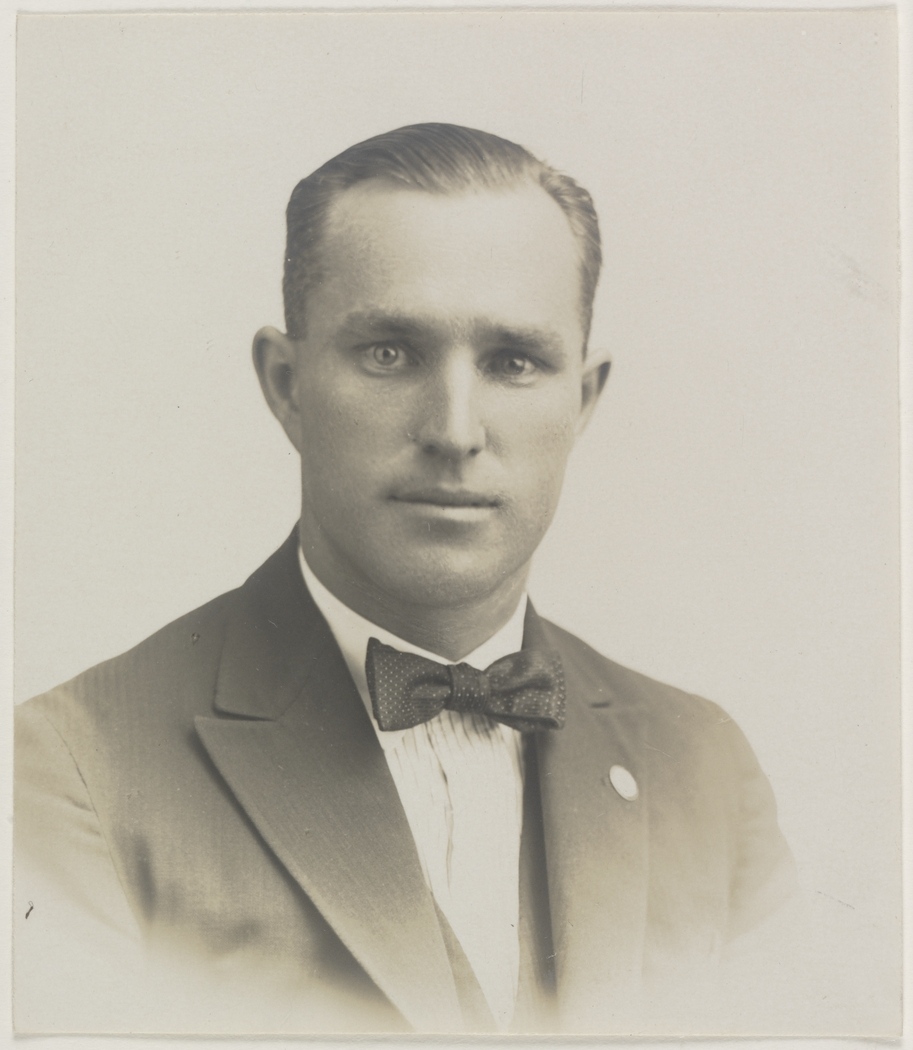
- Studio Portrait of Sam Everett, ca. 1925

Personal information
- Full name: Charles Samuel Everett
- Born: 17 June 1901; Marrickville, Sydney, Australia
- Died: 10 October 1970 (aged 69); Concord, Sydney, Australia
- Batting: Left-handed
- Bowling: Right-arm fast
- Role: bowler

Domestic team information
- Years: Team
- 1921–1930: New South Wales
- 1924–1927: Australian XI
- 1926: Australians
- FC debut: 3 December 1921 New South Wales v Queensland
- Last FC: 9 January 1930 New South Wales v South Australia

Career statistics
Competition	FC
Matches	45
Runs scored	617
Batting average	14.69
100s/50s	0/3
Top score	77
Balls bowled	7336
Wickets	134
Bowling average	27.11
5 wickets in innings	8
10 wickets in match	0
Best bowling	6/23
Catches/stumpings	26/0
- Source: CricketArchive, 26 August 2009

Charles Samuel Everett (17 June 1901 – 10 October 1970) was an Australian cricketer who played first-class cricket for New South Wales from 1921 to 1930.

Everett was born in Sydney and educated at Newington College (1917–1918). A right-arm fast medium bowler and left-handed batsman for Petersham Cricket Club, Everett took 134 wickets at first-class level at an average of 27.11 runs per wicket. He was chosen as part of the Australian squad to tour in England in 1926 but illness and poor form meant he missed selection for the Test matches.

His best bowling figures, 6/23, were taken against Queensland in January 1930; in the same match Donald Bradman scored his then-record 452.

== See also ==
- List of New South Wales representative cricketers
