= 1922 Currie Cup =

Domestic rugby union competition

- Countries: South Africa
- Champions: Transvaal (1st title)

The 1922 Currie Cup was the 13th edition of the Currie Cup, the premier domestic rugby union competition in South Africa.

The tournament was won by Transvaal for the first time.

== See also ==
- Currie Cup
