= Gordon Morgan (Australian cricketer) =

Australian cricketer

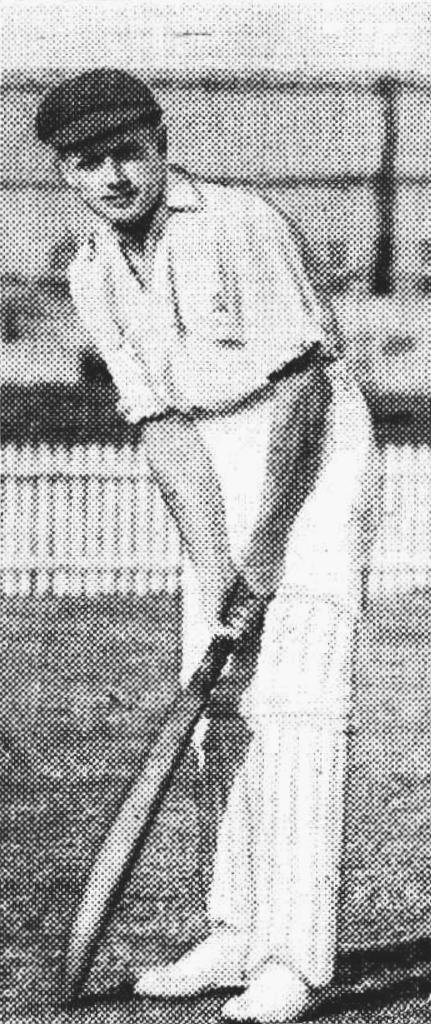
Gordon Morgan, 1927.

John Gordon Morgan (6 March 1893 – 7 May 1967) was an Australian cricketer who played first-class cricket for New South Wales across the 1920s. He was born at Camperdown, a suburb of Sydney, New South Wales and died at Concord, another Sydney suburb.

Morgan was a right-handed batsman sometimes, and particularly in his later cricket career, used as an opening batsman, and a right-arm medium-pace bowler. He was picked first for New South Wales in December 1921 but played irregularly, and usually in the less glamorous fixtures, until 1926–27, when the retirement of senior players such as Warren Bardsley opened up opportunities in the state side and he was a regular for two seasons. His three first-class centuries all came in these two seasons with a score of 121 against Queensland in 1927–28 his highest; in this match, he put on 253 for the sixth wicket with Alan Kippax, who made an unbeaten 315, and this remains the highest partnership for that wicket for either side in first-class matches between New South Wales and Queensland.

== See also ==
- List of New South Wales representative cricketers
