= Horace Sandford =

Australian cricketer

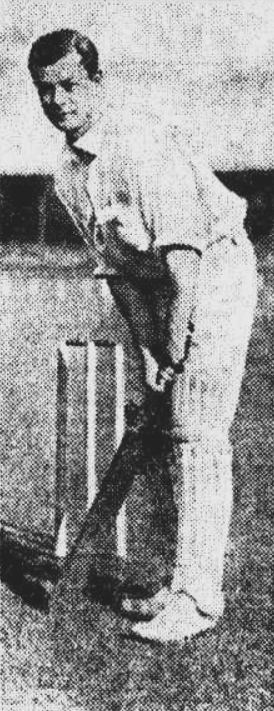

Personal information
- Born: 14 October 1891; Sydney, Australia
- Died: 16 August 1967 (aged 75); Melbourne, Australia

Domestic team information
- Years: Team
- 1912-1931: Victoria
- Source: Cricinfo, 16 November 2015

Horace Sandford (14 October 1891 – 16 August 1967) was an Australian cricketer. He played ten first-class cricket matches for Victoria between 1912 and 1931.

== See also ==
- List of Victoria first-class cricketers
