= Richie Cranny =

Mixed martial arts coach

- Born: 1 April 1971 (age 55)
- Team: Wimp 2 Warrior
- Rank: 3rd-degree Black belt in PRO MAI MMA; Black belt in Choi Kwang-Do

Other information
- Mixed martial arts record from Sherdog

Richie Cranny (born 1 April 1971) is an Australian Mixed martial arts (MMA) coach and creator of the Mixed Martial Arts training program Wimp 2 Warrior.

== Early life ==
Richie Cranny was born in England and grew up in and around London. Cranny initially began training boxing from the age of eleven under Bruce Wells and Choi Kwang-Do karate in his late teens. From 1997, Cranny's participation in martial arts and combat sports led him to become a student under Lee Aylett, who founded Pro Mai MMA in Feltham, West London, in 2000. Cranny is a 3rd-degree black belt in the integrated fighting system of Pro MAI (Progressive Martial Arts Initiatives). His amateur record is 4–1–1.

He emigrated to Sydney, Australia in 2003.

== Mixed martial arts career ==
In 2003, Cranny made his professional debut against James Thompson (fighter). Thompson out-weighted Cranny by more than 20 kilograms and he submitted Richie in the first round via bulldog choke at UC 7: World Domination. After relocating to Australia, Richie suffered a career ending back injury in training, forcing him to withdraw from the sport altogether for nearly two years.

Professional record breakdown
1 match	0 wins	1 loss
By submission	0	1

Res.	Record	Opponent	Method	Event	Date	Round	Time	Location	Notes
Loss	0–1	James Thompson	Loss	UC 7: World Domination	6 September 2003	1	1:34	Chippenham, England	

== MMA coach ==
Cranny later become an MMA coach. He ran an MMA gym called Platinum Extreme from 2010 to 2013, and in 2011 he opened the MMA Coaching Academy to teach coaching techniques.

He began writing a column on MMA for the Australian Men's Fitness Magazine in 2012, and contributes to other MMA and fitness media outlets as well. he was made the MMA Editor for Men's Fitness magazine in 2016 after several popular articles including having Ronda Rousey on the front cover, the first women ever to cover for Men's Fitness Australia.

== Wimp 2 Warrior ==
In 2012, Cranny created a MMA training program called Wimp 2 Warrior, to train inexperienced individuals in MMA techniques. The training program lasted six months, and includes strength and conditioning training (coordinated by Rachel Guy) and mentoring from MMA fighters including Mark Hunt, Jens Pulver and Royce Gracie. The second series was hosted by television personality Ortenzia Borre. and was filmed and aired on Fox Sports 1 in Australia. The program is open to both male and females. A dedicated Wimp 2 Warrior gym in Sydney, Australia, will be opened in December 2014 and the program is now run in over 40 world class gyms in seven countries including the likes of SBG Dublin with John Kavanagh. In 2020, Cranny was appointed Athletic Advisor for the boxing, MMA and fitness equipment brand Sparbar.
