= Arthur Millward =

English cricketer and Test match umpire

Arthur Millward (1858–1933) was a first-class cricketer and Test match umpire. Born in Kidderminster in 1858 he played one match for the North of England, scoring an unbeaten 19 in his only innings, and stood in 2 Test matches, the England v South Africa game at Lord's in 1907 and the Ashes match at Headingley in 1921. He died in Eastbourne in 1933.
