= Richard Townsend (sportsman) =

Australian rules footballer and cricketer

Personal information
- Full name: Richard James Bruce Townsend
- Born: 12 August 1886; Mount Torrens, South Australia
- Died: 17 January 1960 (aged 73); Waikerie, South Australia
- Batting: Left-handed
- Bowling: Right-arm medium
- Role: All-rounder

Domestic team information
- Years: Team
- 1907/08–1923/24: South Australia

Career statistics
Competition	First-class
Matches	17
Runs scored	584
Batting average	18.25
100s/50s	1/0
Top score	117
Balls bowled	2,837
Wickets	37
Bowling average	40.51
5 wickets in innings	2
10 wickets in match	0
Best bowling	5/27
Catches/stumpings	14/–
- Source: CricketArchive, 22 May 2022

Richard James Bruce Townsend (12 August 1886 – 17 January 1960) was an Australian sportsman who represented South Australia in both Australian rules football and cricket. He played for Norwood in the South Australian Football League (SAFL) and Sheffield Shield cricket for the South Australian cricket team.

Townsend was in his mid 30s when he established a spot for himself in the state cricket team, by which time his football career had ended. He had been one of the best pre-war players in the SAFL, playing in Norwood's 1904 and 1907 premiership sides. An interstate representative at the 1908 Melbourne Carnival, Townsend had one of his best league seasons in 1909 when he topped the SAFL goal-kicking list. In 1911 he was Norwood's leading goal-kicker for the second time and in 1912 he won their "Best and Fairest" award. He continued playing after the war, by which time he was a veteran of the club and was rewarded with the captaincy in 1920, his final season. Norwood made it all the way to the grand final that year but lost to North Adelaide.

With his football career almost over, Townsend was recalled to the South Australian cricket team in 1918/19, after an eleven-year gap between appearances. He had previously, in 1907/08, played a Sheffield Shield match, where he didn't bowl yet batted far down the order at nine. His role this time was more clear and in his return match, against Victoria, he took 5–27 in their second innings and opening the batting in the first.

Although he was an all-rounder, he only once passed 50 in 17 first-class matches. That innings coincided with one of his best ever bowling performances, in the 1921/22 Shield season against New South Wales at Adelaide Oval. He took seven wickets in total for the match, five of them in the first innings, and put together scores of 46 and 117 with the bat. The 46 had equaled his highest first-class score and his century, made in the fourth innings, was made with 18 boundaries. His innings helped South Australia to a score of 406 but it wasn't enough for victory as they fell 17 runs short. He had nonetheless become just the third South Australian cricketer to take a five wicket haul and score a century in the same first-class match. Eight of the nine previous instances that feat had been achieved for South Australian were from Norwood footballer and Test cricketer George Giffen.

After his last first-class match, in 1923/24, Townsend continued playing grade cricket for Sturt until his retirement in 1928.
