= Cec Parkin =

English cricketer

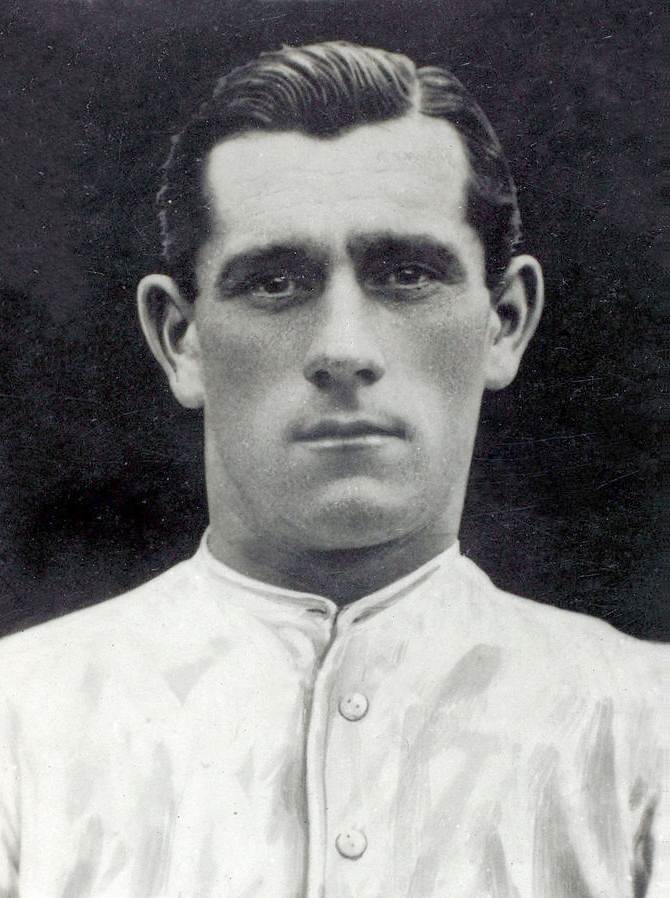
- Parkin on a 1922 card

Personal information
- Full name: Cecil Harry Parkin
- Born: 18 February 1886; Eaglescliffe, Stockton-on-Tees, England
- Died: 15 June 1943 (aged 57); Cheetham Hill, Manchester, England
- Batting: Right-handed
- Bowling: Right-arm off-break

International information
- National side: England
- Test debut: 17 December 1920 v Australia
- Last Test: 14 June 1924 v South Africa

Career statistics
Competition	Test	First-class
Matches	10	197
Runs scored	160	2,425
Batting average	12.30	11.77
100s/50s	0/0	0/4
Top score	36	57
Balls bowled	2,095	42,101
Wickets	32	1,048
Bowling average	35.25	17.58
5 wickets in innings	2	93
10 wickets in match	0	27
Best bowling	5/38	9/32
Catches/stumpings	3/–	126/–
- Source: CricInfo, 1 February 2020

Cecil Harry Parkin (18 February 1886 – 15 June 1943), known as Cec or Ciss Parkin, was an English cricketer who played in 10 Test matches between 1920 and 1924 and made 157 appearances for Lancashire County Cricket Club.

== Life and career ==
Parkin played one first-class match for Yorkshire in 1906, before it was discovered that he was born twenty yards outside the county boundary. Despite the fact that many cricketers had appeared for Yorkshire who were not born inside the county boundaries he then spent the next 8 years playing league and minor counties cricket for Durham. From 1910 he represented Church CC in the Lancashire League, taking 685 wickets in six seasons at an average of 8.27. He then joined Lancashire and played at Old Trafford from 1914 to 1926, although four of these years were lost to the Great War. He was a Wisden Cricketer of the Year in 1924.

In 1921 he was described as the best bowler in England. He took 14 Leicestershire County Cricket Club wickets on his debut for the Red Rose at Liverpool in 1914, when he was already 28, and did not become a full-time cricketer until the age of 34 in 1921, the year he topped the Test averages against Warwick Armstrong's mighty Australian side. Before then he had combined his Saturday league commitments for Rochdale CC with appearances for Lancashire.

He took 14 wickets in the 1919 Roses Match at Old Trafford at just 10 apiece and, in the first innings of the Gentlemen v Players match of 1920 dismissed 9 Gentlemen at the Oval, six clean bowled, for 85. He was picked for England's tour of Australia that winter and took 5 for 60 in the first innings at Adelaide in a difficult rubber for the England team. He was England's most successful bowler in all first-class games on the tour however, with 73 at 21 each. In all he played 8 Tests against Australia without ever appearing on the winning side. He is one of the few players to have opened both the bowling and batting, against Australia at Old Trafford, for England, a remarkable performance by a spin bowler who played only 10 games.

He was known for his outspoken views that often saw him clash with cricketing authorities. He was dropped from the England team when he criticised England Captain Arthur Gilligan in a newspaper article and fell out with the Lancashire Committee two years later which ended his first-class career. After leaving Lancashire he returned to league cricket and continued to prove a heavy wicket taker for many years.

He was Lancashire's best bowler in 1923, taking 209 wickets at 16.94, and 1924, 200 at just 13.67, but in 1925 took 'only' 121 wickets at 20.79. Ted McDonald and Dick Tyldesley began to dominate the attack for the powerful Lancashire team as they sought to end Yorkshire's dominance of the County Championship. His benefit match with Middlesex in 1925 realised £1,880 and in 1926 he played in eleven county matches, taking 36 wickets at 15.13 and helped Lancashire win the championship for the first time since 1904. A dispute with the powers that be saw his first-class career end at 40.

He wrote lively accounts of his cricketing days and was a talented conjurer and magician.

== Books ==
- Cricket Reminiscences: Humorous and Otherwise (1923)
- Parkin Again: More Cricket Reminiscences (1925)
- Cricket Triumphs and Troubles (1936)
