= Clive Braybrook =

Australian cricketer

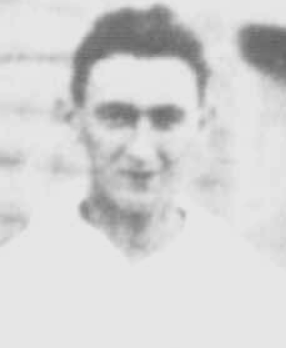

Personal information
- Born: 27 September 1901; Goodwood, South Australia
- Died: 16 July 1985 (aged 83); Swan Hill, Victoria, Australia
- Batting: Right-handed
- Bowling: Leg Break

Domestic team information
- Years: Team
- 1921/22: South Australia

Career statistics
Competition	First-class
Matches	1
Runs scored	27
Batting average	27.00
100s/50s	0/0
Top score	26
Balls bowled	133
Wickets	3
Bowling average	34.33
5 wickets in innings	0
10 wickets in match	0
Best bowling	3/52
Catches/stumpings	0/–
- Source: Cricinfo, 18 May 2018

Clive Braybrook (27 September 1901 – 16 July 1985) was an Australian cricketer. He played one first-class match for South Australia during the 1921–22 season.
