= Hugh Bridgman =

Australian cricketer (1890–1953)

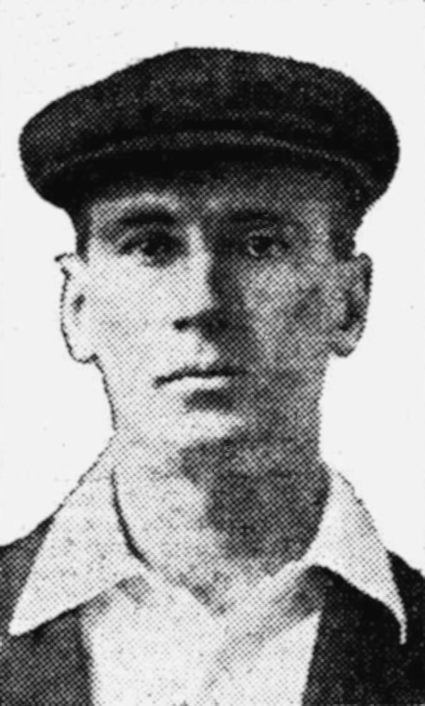

Personal information
- Full name: Hugh Hossick Mackay Bridgman
- Born: 1 February 1890; Findon, South Australia
- Died: 3 December 1953 (aged 63); Torrensville, South Australia
- Batting: Left-handed
- Bowling: Right-arm medium
- Role: All-rounder

Domestic team information
- Years: Team
- 1912/13–1922/23: South Australia

Career statistics
| Competition | First-class |
|---|---|
| Matches | 10 |
| Runs scored | 252 |
| Batting average | 15.75 |
| 100s/50s | 0/2 |
| Top score | 65 |
| Balls bowled | 820 |
| Wickets | 9 |
| Bowling average | 59.00 |
| 5 wickets in innings | 0 |
| 10 wickets in match | 0 |
| Best bowling | 2/25 |
| Catches/stumpings | 6/– |
- Source: Cricinfo, 18 May 2018

Hugh Hossick Mackay Bridgman (1 February 1890 – 3 December 1953) was an Australian cricketer. He played ten first-class matches for South Australia between 1912 and 1923.

In addition to representing South Australia in cricket Bridgman was active in cricket administration serving as a South Australian selector from at least 1922, and he went on to become a member of the Board of Control and a committeeman of the South Australian Cricket Association after his playing career.

== See also ==
- List of South Australian representative cricketers
