= William Phillips (cricketer, born 1876) =

English cricketer and umpire

William Phillips (15 December 1876 – unknown) was an English cricketer active from 1904 to 1908 who played for Lancashire. He was born in Manchester. He appeared in ten first-class matches as a wicketkeeper. He scored 109 runs with a highest score of 18 and held 17 catches with two stumpings. Phillips later became an umpire who officiated in two Test matches, at Lord's and The Oval, in the 1921 series.
