= Jack Russell (cricketer, born 1887) =

English cricketer (1887–1961)

C A G Russell
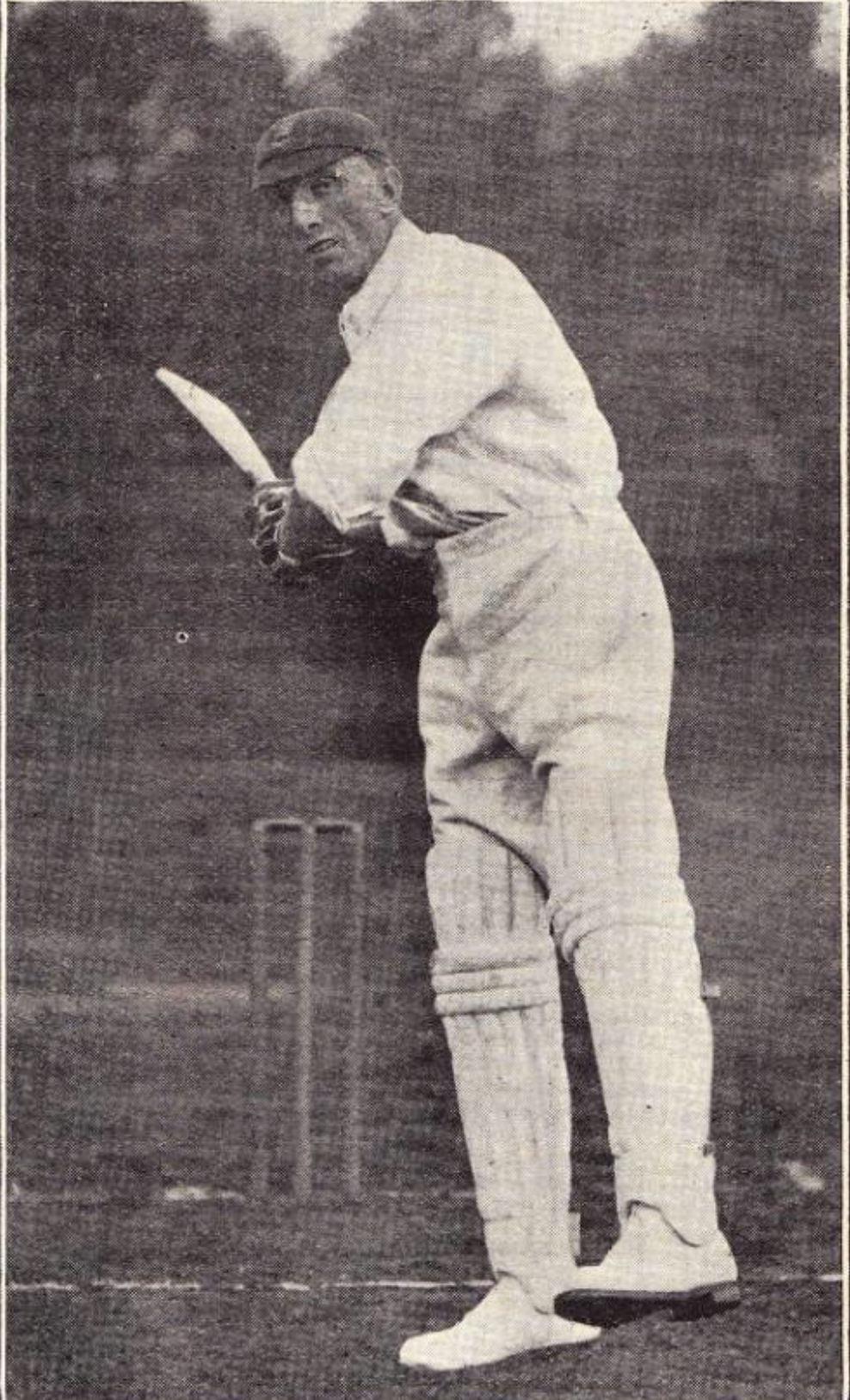
- Russell in 1921

Cricket information
- Batting: Right-handed
- Bowling: Right-arm slow medium

International information
- National side: England
- Test debut: 17 December 1920 v Australia
- Last Test: 22 February 1923 v South Africa

Career statistics
| Competition | Test | First-class |
|---|---|---|
| Matches | 10 | 437 |
| Runs scored | 910 | 27,354 |
| Batting average | 56.87 | 41.57 |
| 100s/50s | 5/2 | 71/136 |
| Top score | 140 | 273 |
| Balls bowled | – | 19,715 |
| Wickets | – | 283 |
| Bowling average | – | 26.98 |
| 5 wickets in innings | – | 5 |
| 10 wickets in match | – | 0 |
| Best bowling | – | 5/25 |
| Catches/stumpings | 4/– | 314/– |
- Source: CricInfo, 9 May 2014

Charles Albert George "Jack" Russell (erroneously written during his playing career as Albert Charles Russell) (7 October 1887 – 23 March 1961) was one of the leading batsmen in county cricket during the period after World War I. Right-handed with both bat and with ball as a medium-slow bowler, Russell's main strength was his leg-side play with the bat. He was a sound batsmen whose watchfulness made him effective on very difficult pitches.

A son of Essex's first regular wicket-keeper, Thomas Russell, and a cousin of Kent bowler Tich Freeman, Russell first played for Essex in 1908 but did not establish himself until 1913. In that year he reached 1,000 runs and repeated this for the next three years, but it was only a knock of 197 against Middlesex at Lord's in 1920 that elevated Russell to the rank of a top-class batsman. His 2,432 runs was third-highest in the country behind Hobbs and Hendren and he was an automatic choice for that winter's Ashes tour. Though the failure of England's professional bowling on the rock-hard Australian wickets meant England lost all five Tests, Russell did well with an average of 58.42 for all matches, including 135 at Adelaide. However, he wasn't selected for any of the first three Tests in 1921 when England were largely outclassed by Warwick Armstrong's Australians. He was brought in for the fourth Test and scored 101. Then he scored 102 not out in the final Test. His batting helped England draw the last two Tests, although Australia won the series 3–0.

1922 was Russell's finest season: his 2,575 runs was a personal best and placed him ahead of Hobbs as the leading run-scorer in the country. He was named a Wisden Cricketer of the Year, and scored 162 at Lord's.

That winter, Russell went to South Africa and on the biting matting pitches achieved his finest performance with 436 runs for an average of almost 63. In the last Test - which decided the series - Russell was suffering from a serious illness and, it was admitted, should not have been playing. Yet, he made 140 in the first innings and (going in late) 111 in four and a half hours in the second. He was the first batsman to score a century in both innings of the same Test match for England and he is still the only batsman to score centuries in both innings of his final Test match.

However, illness severely affected Russell's performance in 1923: only after a rest of two weeks in late June did he recover his form, and his average fell from 52 to 29.71. This placed him out of calculations for representative honours, especially as Sutcliffe established himself as a representative player that year. Nonetheless, in 1925 Russell hit seven centuries and scored 2,080 runs, whilst in 1928 he scored 131 and 104 against Lancashire, who were County Champions for the third successive year that season.

After an injury-affected year in 1929, Russell only played one more season before retiring to become county coach and later a groundsman. In 1949, twelve years before he died, Russell was among the first professional cricketers to be given membership of the Marylebone Cricket Club (MCC).
