= Andrew Smith (Australian cricketer) =

Australian cricketer

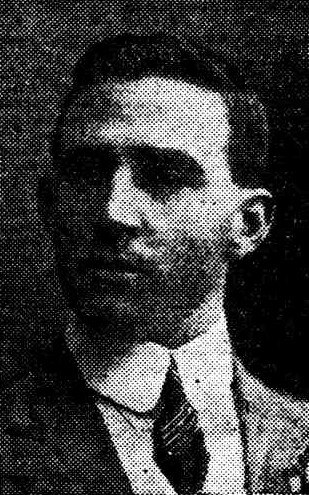

Personal information
- Born: 1 September 1889; Port Adelaide, South Australia
- Died: 18 May 1983 (aged 93); Adelaide, South Australia
- Batting: Right-handed
- Bowling: Legbreak, googly

Career statistics
Competition	First-class
Matches	12
Runs scored	774
Batting average	33.65
100s/50s	2/3
Top score	122
Balls bowled	?
Wickets	17
Bowling average	48.76
5 wickets in innings	1
10 wickets in match	0
Best bowling	5/120
Catches/stumpings	5/–
- Source: Cricinfo, 27 May 2020

Andrew Smith (1 September 1889 – 18 May 1983) was an Australian cricketer. He played twelve first-class matches for South Australia between 1913/14 and 1921/22. He was a slow bowler for West Torrens in district cricket.
