= Arthur Liddicut =

Australian cricketer

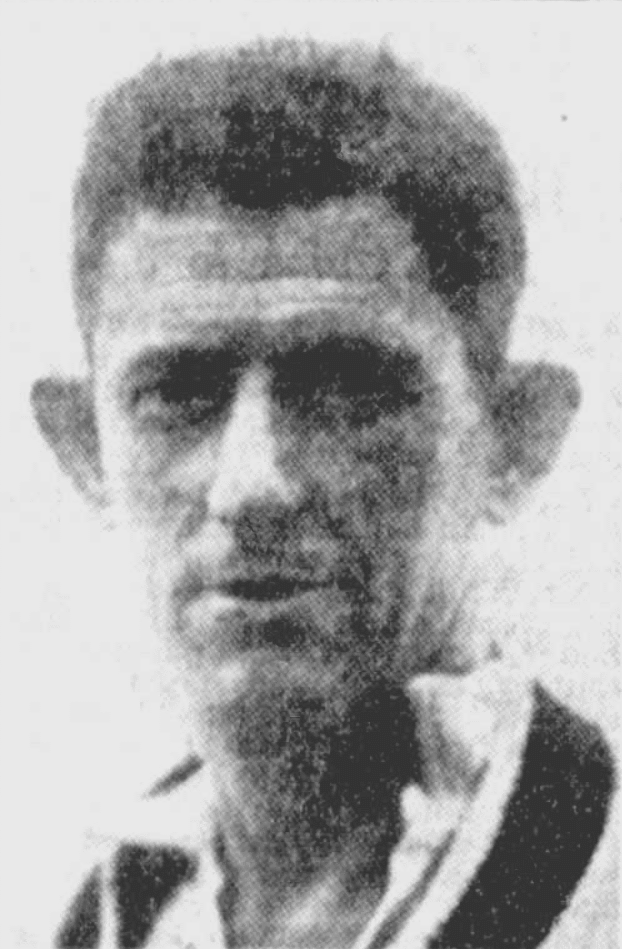

Personal information
- Full name: Arthur Edward Liddicut
- Born: 17 October 1891; Melbourne, Australia
- Died: 8 April 1983 (aged 91); Melbourne, Australia
- Batting: Right-handed
- Bowling: Right-arm fast-medium

Domestic team information
- Years: Team
- 1912-1933: Victoria

Career statistics
Competition	First-class
Matches	62
Runs scored	2503
Batting average	31.28
100s/50s	3/11
Top score	152
Balls bowled	9837
Wickets	133
Bowling average	27.56
5 wickets in innings	2
10 wickets in match	0
Best bowling	7/40
Catches/stumpings	31/–
- Source: Cricinfo, 25 August 2018

Arthur Edward Liddicut (17 October 1891 – 8 April 1983) was an Australian cricketer. He played first-class cricket for Victoria between 1912 and 1933.

A lower-middle-order batsman and fast-medium bowler, Liddicut toured New Zealand with an Australian team in 1920-21, playing both of the matches against New Zealand, but did not play Test cricket. His highest first-class score was 152 for Victoria against South Australia in 1920-21, batting at number nine. His best bowling figures were 7 for 40 against Tasmania in 1929-30 when, captaining Victoria, he opened the bowling and bowled throughout the innings, dismissing Tasmania for 77. Against the touring MCC team in 1922-23 he took 4 for 16 from 15 eight-ball overs then scored 102 in 138 minutes.

He played 23 seasons of district cricket for Fitzroy (after also playing two seasons with St Kilda in 1912/13 and 1913/14), and was still in the team in his late 40s; and served as the club's delegate to the Victorian Cricket Association from 1931 to 1970.

== See also ==
- List of Victoria first-class cricketers
