= Mudgee Cranney =

Australian cricketer

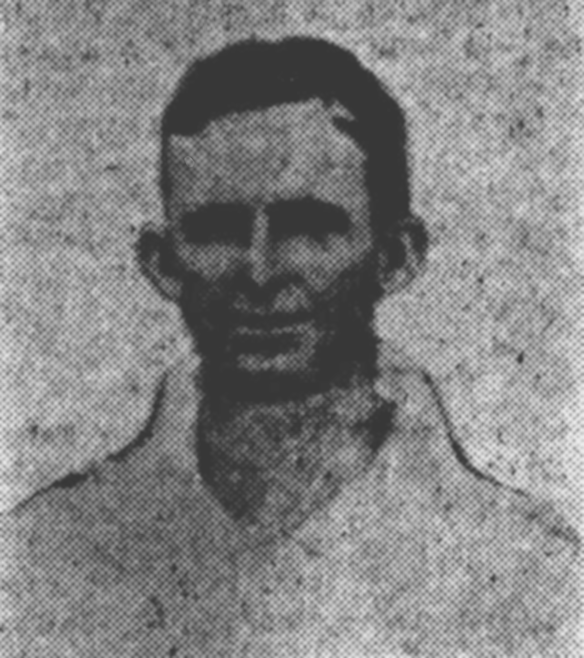

Personal information
- Full name: Harold Cranney
- Born: 23 October 1886; Parramatta, Australia
- Died: 29 January 1971 (aged 84); Sydney, Australia
- Source: ESPNcricinfo, 25 December 2016

Harold "Mudgee" Cranney (23 October 1886 – 29 January 1971) was an Australian cricketer. He played 15 first-class matches for New South Wales from 1909 to 1910 and 1921 to 1922.

== See also ==
- List of New South Wales representative cricketers
