= Edward Freeman (cricketer, born 1860) =

English cricketer

Personal information
- Full name: Edward Charles Freeman
- Born: 7 December 1860; Lewisham, Kent, England
- Died: 16 October 1939 (aged 78); Westbury, Dorset, England
- Batting: Right-handed
- Role: Batsman

Domestic team information
- Years: Team
- 1894–1896: Essex

Career statistics
Competition	First-class
Matches	5
Runs scored	95
Batting average	10.55
100s/50s	0/0
Top score	35
Balls bowled	60
Wickets	0
Bowling average	–
5 wickets in innings	–
10 wickets in match	–
Best bowling	–
Catches/stumpings	1/–
- Source: Cricinfo, 23 July 2013

Edward Freeman (7 December 1860 – 16 October 1939) was an English cricketer. He played for Essex between 1894 and 1896. He was also the curator of Leyton Cricket Ground and worked as a coach and groundsman at Sherborne School.
