= Edward Freeman (cricketer, born 1880) =

English cricketer

Personal information
- Full name: Edward John Freeman
- Born: 16 October 1880; Lewisham, Kent, England
- Died: 22 February 1964 (aged 83); Sherborne, Dorset, England
- Batting: Right-handed
- Role: Wicket-keeper

Domestic team information
- Years: Team
- 1904–1912: Essex

Career statistics
Competition	First-class
Matches	55
Runs scored	1,280
Batting average	14.54
100s/50s	0/7
Top score	84
Balls bowled	108
Wickets	1
Bowling average	50.00
5 wickets in innings	0
10 wickets in match	0
Best bowling	1/6
Catches/stumpings	14/–
- Source: Cricinfo, 23 July 2013

Edward Freeman (16 October 1880 – 22 February 1964) was an English cricketer. He played for Essex between 1904 and 1912.
