= Frank O'Keeffe =

Australian cricketer

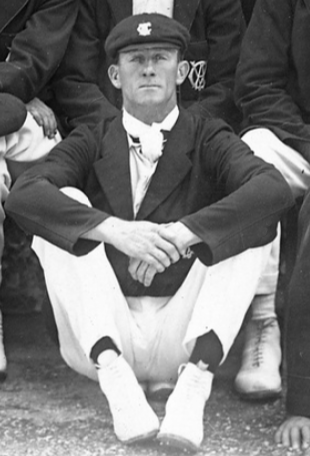

Personal information
- Full name: Francis Joseph Aloysius O'Keeffe
- Born: 11 May 1896; Waverley, Sydney, Australia
- Died: 26 March 1924 (aged 27); Hampstead, London, England
- Batting: Right-handed
- Bowling: Right-arm off-spin

Domestic team information
- Years: Team
- 1919-20 to 1920-21: New South Wales
- 1921-22: Victoria

Career statistics
Competition	First-class
Matches	9
Runs scored	926
Batting average	71.23
100s/50s	3/4
Top score	180
Balls bowled	354
Wickets	12
Bowling average	19.16
5 wickets in innings	1
10 wickets in match	0
Best bowling	5/45
Catches/stumpings	6/0
- Source: Cricinfo, 26 January 2020

Francis Joseph Aloysius O'Keeffe (11 May 1896 – 26 March 1924) was an Australian first-class cricketer who played for New South Wales and Victoria. He was born in Waverley, Sydney.

O'Keeffe played Sydney Grade Cricket for Waverley as a teenager before enlisting in the First Australian Imperial Force and serving for four years in World War I. After the war he was selected for a few matches for New South Wales, but was unable to establish himself in the team, and moved to Victoria in 1921.

He came to fame in the 1921-22 season when he made 87 and 79 for Victoria against New South Wales, 180 against South Australia and 177 and 144 for The Rest against Warwick Armstrong's touring team, newly returned from their Ashes triumph in England.

A good off-break bowler in addition to his powerful batting, O'Keeffe was engaged by the Church club in the Lancashire League and planned to qualify for Lancashire. He led the League's batting averages in 1923. He fell ill with peritonitis and died in a Hampstead hospital in March 1924.

In a mere nine first-class games he scored 926 runs at 71.23 and took 12 wickets at 19.16 with a best of 5 for 45. He was credited in Melbourne for inventing the practice of fielders walking in as the bowler ran in to bowl. Previously run-saving fielders had tended to stay static.

== See also ==
- List of Victoria first-class cricketers
- List of New South Wales representative cricketers
