= Tommy Andrews (cricketer) =

Australian cricketer (1890–1970)

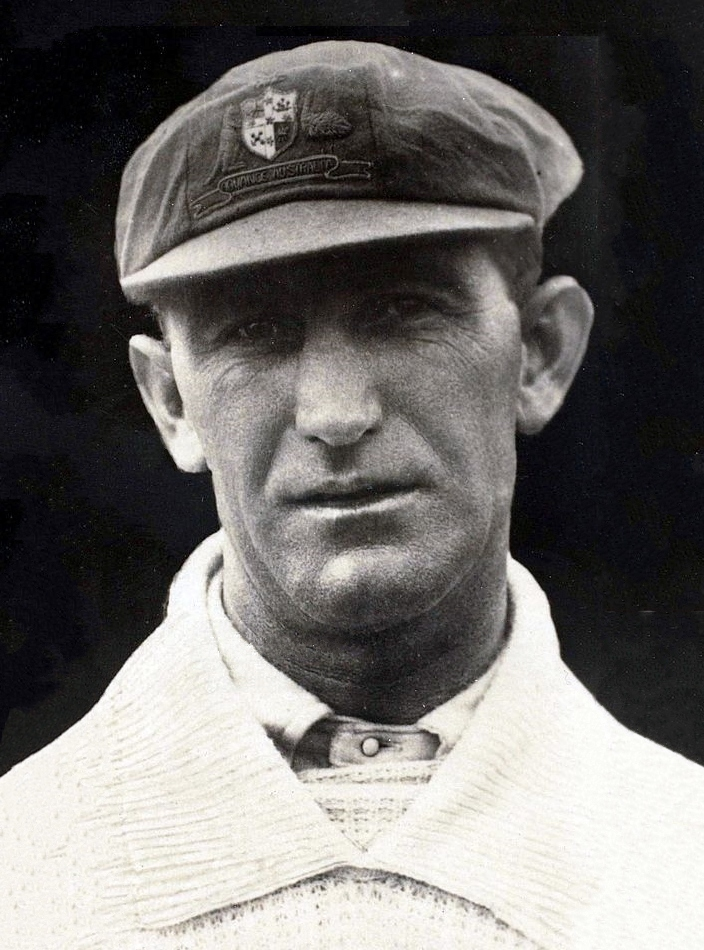

Personal information
- Full name: Thomas James Edwin Andrews
- Born: 26 August 1890; Newtown, Sydney, Australia
- Died: 28 January 1970 (aged 79); Croydon, Sydney, Australia
- Height: 1.63 m (5 ft 4 in)
- Batting: Right-handed
- Bowling: Right arm leg break

International information
- National side: Australia
- Test debut (cap 115): 28 May 1921 v England
- Last Test: 18 August 1926 v England

Domestic team information
- Years: Team
- 1912/13–1930/31: New South Wales

Career statistics
Competition	Tests	First-class
Matches	16	151
Runs scored	592	8,095
Batting average	26.90	39.48
100s/50s	0/4	14/43
Top score	94	247 not out
Balls bowled	156	4,839
Wickets	1	95
Bowling average	116.00	32.10
5 wickets in innings	0	3
10 wickets in match	0	0
Best bowling	1/23	6/109
Catches/stumpings	12/–	86/–
- Source: CricketArchive, 26 January 2009

Thomas James Edwin Andrews (26 August 1890 – 28 January 1970) was an Australian cricketer who played in 16 Tests from 1921 to 1926. At the end of Australia's tour of England in 1921, The Cricketer ranked him as the third best Australian batsman on that year's tour behind Warren Bardsley and Charlie Macartney.

Andrews was an attractive batsman who could bat anywhere in the order, a useful leg-spin bowler, and one of the great cover-point fieldsmen of his day. The Cricketer described him as "very strong and stockily built" with "the sort of hands that resist without discomfort the hardest hits and which, moreover, always seem to be in the right place to gather the ball." "Quickness of foot, clever anticipation and a beautiful return made by the flick of a wrist, are his in addition; and the complete result is a perfect fieldsman."

A regular player for New South Wales from 1912–13 to 1930–31, Andrews came to national attention when he scored 247 not out in 299 minutes against Victoria in the 1919–20 Sheffield Shield. He made his Test debut in the tour of England in 1921, scoring 92 opening the batting in the Third Test, and 94 at number four in the Fifth Test. He also toured England in 1926, when he was unsuccessful in the Tests but scored heavily in other matches.

After he retired from cricket, Andrews took over the family monumental masonry firm.

== See also ==
- List of cricketers called for throwing in top-class cricket matches in Australia
