= Percy Rundell =

Australian cricketer

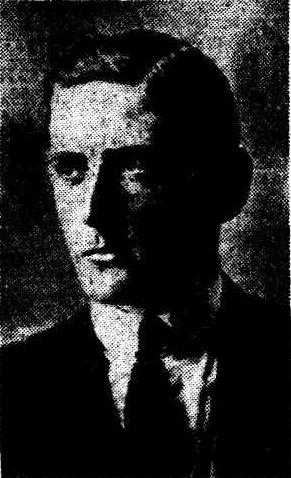

Personal information
- Born: 20 November 1890; Alberton, South Australia
- Died: 24 March 1979 (aged 88); North Adelaide, South Australia
- Batting: Right-handed
- Bowling: Right-arm medium; Right-arm legbreak
- Source: Cricinfo, 27 May 2020

Percy Davies Rundell (20 November 1890 – 24 March 1979) was an Australian cricketer. He played thirty first-class matches for South Australia between 1912/13 and 1925/26. He was an all-rounder for Port Adelaide in district cricket.
