= Ted McDonald =

Australian cricketer

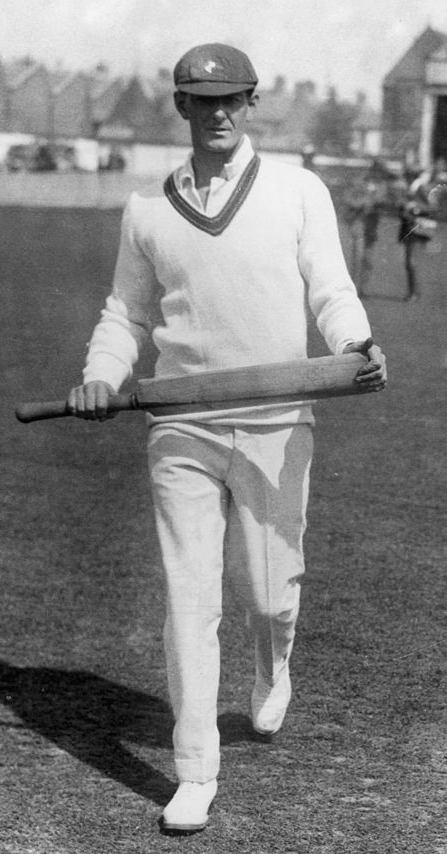
- Born: Edgar Arthur McDonald; 6 January 1891; Launceston, Tasmania, Australia
- Died: 22 July 1937 (aged 46); Blackrod, Lancashire, England
- Cricket career

Cricket information
- Batting: Right-handed
- Bowling: Right-arm fast
- Role: Bowler

International information
- National side: Australia
- Test debut (cap 114): 14 January 1921 v England
- Last Test: 29 November 1921 v South Africa

Domestic team information
- Years: Team
- 1909/10–1910/11: Tasmania
- 1911/12–1921/22: Victoria
- 1924–1931: Lancashire

Career statistics
Competition	Test	First-class
Matches	11	281
Runs scored	116	2,661
Batting average	16.57	10.43
100s/50s	0/0	1/2
Top score	36	100*
Balls bowled	2,885	58,504
Wickets	43	1,395
Bowling average	33.27	20.76
5 wickets in innings	2	119
10 wickets in match	0	31
Best bowling	5/32	8/41
Catches/stumpings	3/–	97/–
- Source: CricketArchive, 1 February 2009
Australian rules football career
Personal information
- Position: Defender
Playing career^{1}
Years	Club	Games (Goals)
1912	Essendon	2 (0)
1913–19	Fitzroy	46 (2)
1919–20	Essendon A (VFA)	25 (2)
- ^{1} Playing statistics correct to the end of 1920.

Edgar Arthur "Ted" McDonald (6 January 1891 – 22 July 1937) was a cricketer who played for Tasmania, Victoria, Lancashire and Australia, as well as being an Australian rules footballer who played with Launceston Football Club, Essendon Football Club, and Fitzroy Football Club before totally concentrating on cricket. Despite a short international career, he was considered by many cricketers as well as commentators to be one of the best fast bowlers of his generation.

== Cricket career ==
A very fast bowler with the ability to cause problems even on docile pitches, Ted McDonald was the unexpected bowling sensation of the 1921 Australian tour to England. He and Jack Gregory caused something approaching panic among the England batsmen: John Evans' knees were allegedly knocking together when he went out to bat, and Andy Ducat was bowled when part of his bat, broken by McDonald's pace, hit the wicket. Where Gregory was able to swing the ball both ways, McDonald imparted vicious movement off the wicket. Like later fast bowling pairs, they were devastating in combination, taking 46 wickets in the series.

McDonald played a few matches for Victoria before the First World War, but came to prominence immediately after it with eight wickets in an innings in a state match. He was picked for three Test matches in the 1920–21 series against England, which Australia won 5–0, but had little success, his six wickets costing 65 runs each. In England the following summer, though, he was an instant success, taking eight wickets in the first Test at Trent Bridge and contributing significantly to the victories at Lord's and Headingley that won the series.

McDonald was named as a Wisden Cricketer of the Year in 1922 for his exploits of the previous summer.

After the England tour, McDonald played in three Tests against South Africa in the 1921–22 series in South Africa. Those, however, were his last Tests – all of his Test cricket was contained within the calendar year of 1921 – as he then took up an engagement as a professional with the Lancashire League club Nelson.

By 1924, McDonald had qualified to play for Lancashire, initially, because of his League commitments, in midweek games only. Again, he was a sensation. In his first full season, 1925, he took 205 wickets, and in the five seasons from 1926 to 1930, Lancashire won the County Championship four times, the most successful period in the county's history. In all, he took 1053 wickets for Lancashire. His value to the county was recognised in the award of a benefit in 1929, an unusually fast reward, for he had been playing county cricket for only five seasons.

McDonald's first-class career ended fairly suddenly. His form dipped in 1930, though he still took more than 100 wickets, but in 1931, he lost form almost entirely, taking just 26 wickets all season and being left out of the county team for half the matches. At the end of the season, he went back to the Lancashire League with Bacup.

== Australian rules football ==
McDonald also played Australian rules football for Launceston, and for Essendon Football Club (two matches in 1912) and Fitzroy Football Club (46 matches from 1913 to 1919).

== Death ==
McDonald died at the age of 46, when his car collided with another near Bolton, England, on the morning of 22 July 1937.

Sporting positions
Preceded by George Geary	Nelson Cricket Club; Professional; 1922–1924	Succeeded by Jimmy Blanckenberg
