= West Indian cricket team in Australia and New Zealand in 1930–31 =

International cricket tour

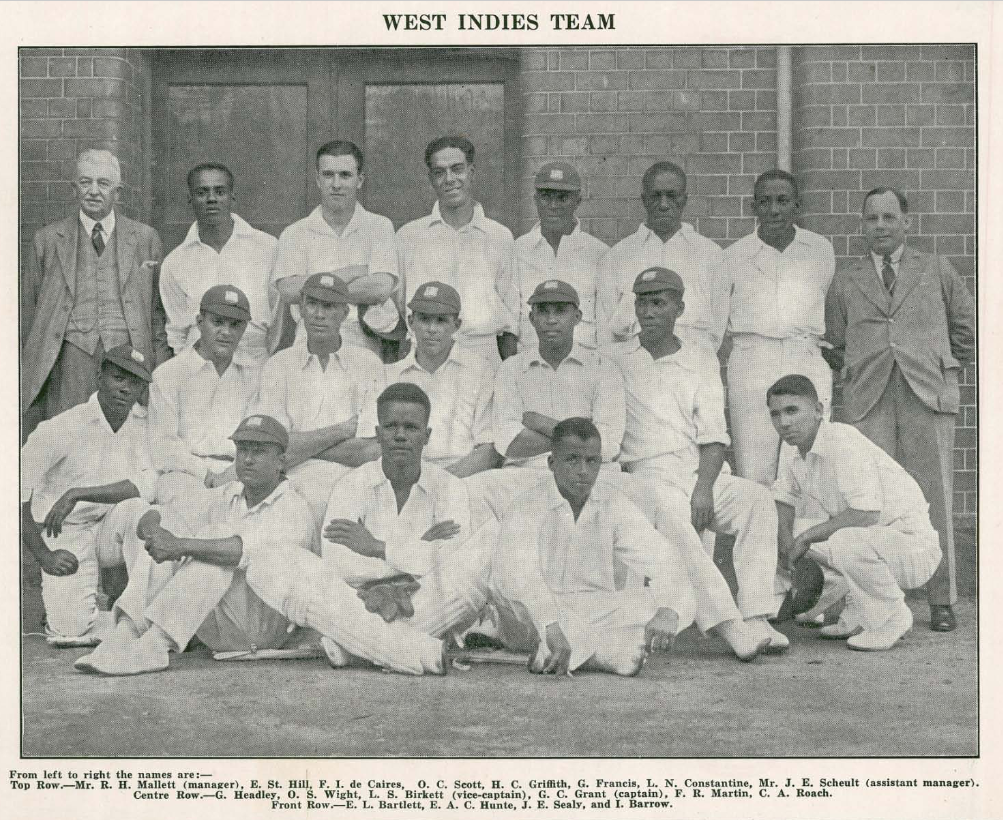
The West Indies team in Melbourne in 1930.

The West Indies cricket team toured New Zealand and Australia from November 1930 to March 1931 and played a five-match Test series against the Australia national cricket team. Australia won the series 4–1. Australia were captained by Bill Woodfull, while the West Indies were coached by Jackie Grant. In addition, the West Indians played nine first-class matches against Australian state teams and, in November, one match in New Zealand against Wellington.

== Team ==
- Jackie Grant (captain)
- Lionel Birkett (vice-captain)
- Ivan Barrow
- Barto Bartlett
- Learie Constantine
- Frank de Caires
- George Francis
- Herman Griffith
- George Headley
- Errol Hunte
- Frank Martin
- Clifford Roach
- Tommy Scott
- Derek Sealy
- Edwin St Hill
- Vibart Wight

The manager was R. H. Mallett.

== New Zealand series summary ==
12–13 November 1930
(2-day match)
Scorecard

Wellington	v	West Indies
195 (73.3 overs); HM McGirr 37; LN Constantine 6/24 (14.3 overs)		128/4 (36 overs); LS Birkett 40*; ED Blundell 3/33 (11 overs)

Match drawn
Basin Reserve, Wellington
Umpires: LT Cobcroft and WP Page

- Wellington won the toss and decided to bat
- Only 90 minutes of play was possible on the second day due to rain

== Test series summary ==
=== First Test ===
12–16 December 1930
(Timeless Test)
Scorecard

West Indies	v	Australia
296 (127.1 overs); EL Bartlett 84; CV Grimmett 7/87 (48 overs)		376 (117.5 overs); AF Kippax 146; OC Scott 4/83 (20.5 overs)
249 (98 overs); GC Grant 71*; A Hurwood 4/86 (34 overs)		0/172 (55.3 overs); WH Ponsford 92*

Australia won by 10 wickets
Adelaide Oval, Adelaide
Umpires: GA Hele and AG Jenkins

- West Indies won the toss and elected to bat.
- 14 December was taken as a rest day.
- LS Birkett and GC Grant (both WIN), and A Hurwood (AUS) made their Test debuts.

=== Second Test ===
1–5 January 1931
(Timeless Test)
Scorecard

Australia	v	West Indies
369 (116.4 overs); WH Ponsford 183; OC Scott 4/66 (15.4 overs)		107 (50.1 overs); IM Barrow 17; CV Grimmett 4/54 (19.1 overs)
		90 (f/o) (30.3 overs); CA Roach 25; A Hurwood 4/22 (11 overs)

Australia won by an innings and 172 runs
Sydney Cricket Ground, Sydney
Umpires: GE Borwick and WG French

- Australia won the toss and elected to bat.
- 4 January was taken as a rest day.
- There was no play on the second day.

=== Third Test ===
16–20 January 1931
(Timeless Test)
Scorecard

Australia	v	West Indies
558 (147 overs); DG Bradman 223; HC Griffith 4/133 (33 overs)		193 (104.3 overs); GA Headley 102*; RK Oxenham 4/39 (30 overs)
		148 (f/o) (60.3 overs); GA Headley 28; CV Grimmett 5/49 (14.3 overs)

Australia won by an innings and 217 runs
Exhibition Ground, Brisbane
Umpires: JP Orr and AE Wyeth

- Australia won the toss and elected to bat.
- 18 January was taken as a rest day.

=== Fourth Test ===
13–14 February 1931
(Timeless Test)
Scorecard

West Indies	v	Australia
99 (50 overs); GA Headley 33; H Ironmonger 7/23 (20 overs)		8/328d (89.2 overs); DG Bradman 152; FR Martin 3/91 (30.2 overs)
107 (35.4 overs); OC Scott 20*; AG Fairfax 4/31 (14 overs)

Australia won by an innings and 122 runs
Melbourne Cricket Ground, Melbourne
Umpires: AN Barlow and J Richards

- West Indies won the toss and elected to bat.

=== Fifth Test ===
27 February–4 March 1931
(Timeless Test)
Scorecard

West Indies	v	Australia
6/350d (135 overs); FR Martin 123*; CV Grimmett 3/100 (33 overs)		224 (79.2 overs); AG Fairfax 54; GN Francis 4/48 (19 overs)
5/124d (51 overs); CA Roach 34; H Ironmonger 2/44 (16 overs)		220 (75.3 overs); AG Fairfax 60*; HC Griffith 4/50 (13.3 overs)

West Indies won by 30 runs
Sydney Cricket Ground, Sydney
Umpires: HJ Armstrong and WG French

- West Indies won the toss and elected to bat.
- 1 March was taken as a rest day.
- There was no play on the fourth day.
- KE Rigg (AUS) made his Test debut.

== Annual reviews ==
- Wisden Cricketers' Almanack 1932
