= Australian cricket team in England in 1930 =

International cricket tour

1930 Ashes series
- Date: 13 June – 22 August 1930
- Location: England
- Result: Australia won the 5-test series 2-1
Teams
- England: Australia
Captains
- (England) Percy Chapman (England) Bob Wyatt: (Australia) Bill Woodfull
Most runs
- Herbert Sutcliffe 436 Duleepsinhji 416: Donald Bradman 974; Bill Woodfull 345
Most wickets
- Maurice Tate 15 Walter Robins 10: Clarrie Grimmett 29; Percy Hornibrook 13

Australia won the 1930 Ashes series against England, winning two of the matches and losing one, with the other two tests drawn. The Australian tourists were captained by Bill Woodfull, while the home side were led by Percy Chapman, who was dropped in favour of Bob Wyatt in the final Test.

== Test series summary ==
=== First Test ===
13, 14, 16, 17 June 1930
(4-day match)
Scorecard

England	v	Australia
270 (89.4 overs); JB Hobbs 78 (228); CV Grimmett 5/107 (32 overs)		144 (72 overs); AF Kippax 64 (151); RWV Robins 4/51 (17 overs)
302 (96 overs); JB Hobbs 74 (143); CV Grimmett 5/94 (30 overs)		335 (139.2 overs); DG Bradman 131 (287); MW Tate 3/69 (50 overs)

England won by 93 runs
Trent Bridge, Nottingham
Umpires: J Hardstaff and WR Parry

- England won the toss and elected to bat.
- 15 June was taken as a rest day.
- SJ McCabe (AUS) made his Test debut.

=== Second Test ===
27, 28, 30 June, 1 July 1930
(4-day match)
Scorecard

England	v	Australia
425 (128.4 overs); KS Duleepsinhji 173 (321); AG Fairfax 4/101 (31 overs)		729/6d (232 overs); DG Bradman 254 (376); JC White 3/158 (51 overs)
375 (116.4 overs); APF Chapman 121 (166); CV Grimmett 6/167 (53 overs)		72/3 (28.2 overs); WM Woodfull 26* (79); RWV Robins 2/34 (9 overs)

Australia won by 7 wickets
Lord's, London
Umpires: F Chester and TW Oates

- England won the toss and elected to bat.
- 29 June was taken as a rest day.
- GOB Allen (ENG) made his Test debut.

=== Third Test ===
11, 12, 14, 15 July 1930
(4-day match)
Scorecard

Australia	v	England
566 (168 overs); DG Bradman 334 (448); MW Tate 5/124 (39 overs)		391 (175.2 overs); WR Hammond 113 (361); CV Grimmett 5/135 (56.2 overs)
		95/3 (f/o) (51.5 overs); WR Hammond 35 (93); PM Hornibrook 1/14 (11.5 overs)

Match drawn
Headingley, Leeds
Umpires: W Bestwick and TW Oates

- Australia won the toss and elected to bat.
- 13 July was taken as a rest day.
- There was only forty-five minutes play on the third day.

=== Fourth Test ===
25, 26, 28, 29 July 1930
(4-day match)
Scorecard

Australia	v	England
345 (167.1 overs); WH Ponsford 83 (267); IAR Peebles 3/150 (55 overs)		251/8 (108 overs); H Sutcliffe 74 (172); SJ McCabe 4/41 (17 overs)

Match drawn
Old Trafford, Manchester
Umpires: F Chester and J Hardstaff

- Australia won the toss and elected to bat.
- 27 July was taken as a rest day.
- There was only forty-five minutes play on the third day.
- There was no play on the final day.
- TWJ Goddard (ENG) made his Test debut.

=== Fifth Test ===
16, 18, 19, 20, 21, 22 August 1930
(Timeless Test)
Scorecard

England	v	Australia
405 (171.2 overs); H Sutcliffe 161 (391); CV Grimmett 4/135 (66.2 overs)		695 (256.1 overs); DG Bradman 232 (417); IAR Peebles 6/204 (71 overs)
251 (99.2 overs); WR Hammond 60 (136); PM Hornibrook 7/92 (31.2 overs)

Australia won by an innings and 39 runs
The Oval, London
Umpires: J Hardstaff and WR Parry

- England won the toss and elected to bat.
- 17 August was taken as a rest day.
- The match was completed in six days.

== 1930 Australian Team Ashes warm-up ==
Before touring England for the 1930 Ashes Tour, the Australian team led by Bill Woodfull headed to Tasmania to play two first-class matches against Tasmania. The first match was played at the NTCA Ground before the teams moved on to Hobart. Hobart paper The Mercury said:

No previous visit of an International team has aroused more widespread interest than that of Woodfull's XI. It is thought probable that [Don] Bradman will play at Launceston and Hobart. To date this season he has made 1,400 runs in first-class cricket, and requires another 200 to equal the record he established last season. By laying in both matches his chances of breaking his own record would be enhanced. Bradman is the most popular cricketer in Australia today, and is certain of a flattering reception on the occasion of his first appearance in Tasmania."

After leaving Port Melbourne on ship the Nairana, the Australians arrived in Launceston via the Tamar River at 9am on 8 March 1930, as "a big crowd waited to greet the tourists". Later that day, they started their match against a Tasmanian team that included Laurie Nash. The hosts won the toss and batted in "perfect weather", despite being bowled out for 157. Fast-bowler, Alan Fairfax was the main destroyer, taking 4 for 36 (4/36) in 13 overs. Only wicket-keeping opener James Atkinson scored a half-century, as Tasmania collapsed from 1/50. The Australians began their reply positively, with Bill Ponsford and Stan McCabe taking the score to 120 without loss. After Ponsford was dismissed on 36, Alan Kippax and McCabe saw out the final overs of the day, with McCabe finishing not out on 93 and Kippax undefeated on eight.

The next day, The Australians went fishing at the Great Lake, south of Launceston, before resuming the match on Monday. After McCabe scored his century, Australia stumbled to 3/163, bringing Bradman to the crease. In Nash's second over, he trapped Bradman leg before wicket for just 20 scored in 24 minutes. The Australian were eventually bowled out for 311, despite Gerald James taking 5/97 in 22 overs. Although Nash got the wicket of Bradman, the batsmen attacked him, taking 1/82 in 13 overs. By the end of the days play, Tasmania were already under pressure at 6/109.

The next day saw Tasmania bowled out for 158, as Nash was the only batsman to offer any resistance with 49. The Australians were eventual victors by ten wickets. They won the following match in Hobart, before regaining the Ashes 2–1.

The Australians had a stopover in Colombo en route to England and played a one-day single-innings match there against the Ceylon national team, which at that time did not have Test status.

== See also ==
- That's Cricket, a 1931 Australian featurette
