= Melbourne Park, Kingston =

Cricket ground

Coordinates: 17°58′24.29″N 76°47′01.45″W

Melbourne Park was a cricket ground in Kingston, Jamaica. It was the home of Melbourne Cricket Club, the third-oldest cricket club in Jamaica. The ground hosted first-class cricket on 23 occasions between 1908–09 and 1961-62. Melbourne Park's opening first-class match, in February 1909, saw Ranji Hordern, playing for the Philadelphians on their final overseas tour, take 8-44 in the Jamaican first innings and 13-113 in the match; both remain records for the ground.

George Headley performed some notable batting feats on this ground. Playing for Jamaica against Lord Tennyson's XI in February 1932, he struck 344 not out, at the time the highest innings made in the West Indies and a ground record. Headley and Clarence Passailaigue (261*) put on an unbroken stand of 487 for the sixth wicket: this remains (as of 2007) a world record for that wicket. The other two first-class double hundreds scored at Melbourne Park were both Headley's: 211 against Lord Tennyson's XI in 1927–28 and 203* against Barbados in 1946–47.

In the 1960s, the Melbourne Cricket Club ceased using Melbourne Park, and moved to a new ground—Melbourne Oval—about 2 miles away in New Kingston. Melbourne Park is now owned Kingston College.

== Records ==
=== First-class ===
- Highest team total: 702/5 declared by Jamaica v Lord Tennyson's XI, 1931–32
- Lowest team total: 90 by Barbados v Jamaica, 1958
- Highest individual innings: 344* by George Headley, Jamaica v Lord Tennyson's XI, 1931–32
- Best bowling in an innings: 8–44 by Ranji Hordern for Philadelphians v Jamaica, 1908–09
