= Clarence Passailaigue =

West Indian cricketer

Charles Passailaigue
Personal information
- Full name: Charles Clarence Passailaigue
- Born: 4 August 1901; Kingston, Jamaica
- Died: 7 January 1972 (aged 70); Montego Bay, Jamaica
- Batting: Right-handed

International information
- National side: West Indies
- Only Test (cap 29): 3 April 1930 v England

Career statistics
Competition	Test	First-class
Matches	1	12
Runs scored	46	788
Batting average	46.00	52.53
100s/50s	0/0	2/2
Top score	44	261*
Balls bowled	12	62
Wickets	0	1
Bowling average	–	56.00
5 wickets in innings	–	0
10 wickets in match	–	0
Best bowling	–	1/22
Catches/stumpings	3/–	11/–
- Source: Cricinfo, 30 October 2022

Charles Clarence Passailaigue (4 August 1901 – 7 January 1972) was a Jamaican cricketer who played one Test for West Indies in 1930.

Although Passailaigue's career spanned the 1930s, he played first-class cricket only sporadically. As an attacking batsman he announced himself to the cricketing world by scoring 183 for Jamaica at Melbourne Park, Kingston, in March 1930, against a touring MCC side led by Freddie Calthorpe. After that performance he was selected for the Fourth Test, played a few days later at Sabina Park, Jamaica. In this timeless match played over nine days, he scored 44 and 2 not out, held three catches – from Hendren, Wyatt and Haig – and bowled a couple of overs, taking 0 for 15.

On the basis of these first two performances, many considered him unlucky not to win a place for the first tour to visit Australia in 1930-31 and never again to be selected for a Test match. Passailaigue recorded his highest score of 261 not out in just his third first-class match, in 1931–32. Playing for All Jamaica against the Hon. Lionel Tennyson's side at Melbourne Park, Jamaica amassed 702 runs for five wickets in their only innings and with his good friend, George Headley, Passailaigue shared an unbeaten stand of 487. This remains the world record first-class sixth-wicket partnership. His only first-class wicket was that of H.P. Bayley, taken in Passailaigue's final match, playing for Jamaica against a Combined XI in Trinidad in 1939.
