= Alan Fairfax =

Australian cricketer (1906–1955)

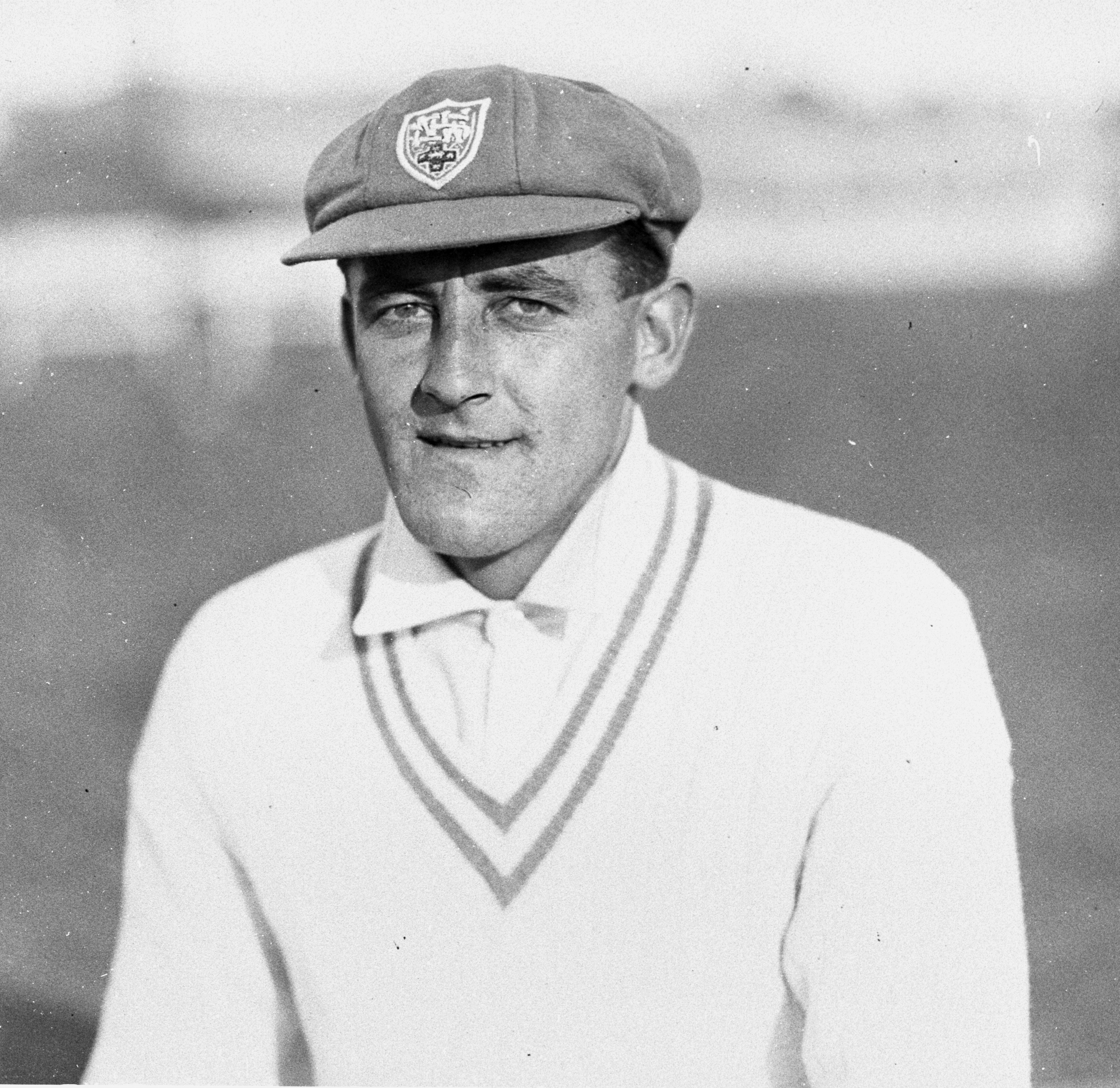

Personal information
- Born: 16 June 1906; Summer Hill, New South Wales, Sydney
- Died: 17 May 1955 (aged 48); Kensington, London, England
- Batting: Right-handed
- Bowling: Right-arm fast-medium

International information
- National side: Australia
- Test debut (cap 131): 8 March 1929 v England
- Last Test: 27 February 1931 v West Indies

Career statistics
Competition	Test	First-class
Matches	10	56
Runs scored	410	1,910
Batting average	51.25	28.93
100s/50s	0/4	1/9
Top score	65	104
Balls bowled	1,520	9,897
Wickets	21	134
Bowling average	30.71	27.87
5 wickets in innings	0	2
10 wickets in match	0	0
Best bowling	4/31	6/54
Catches/stumpings	15/–	41/–
- Source: CricketArchive, 14 October 2022

Alan Geoffrey Fairfax (16 June 1906 – 17 May 1955) was an Australian cricketer who played in ten Test matches from 1929 to 1931. He was an all rounder.

Fairfax had a rapid rise to international honours, making his test debut the same season as his first class debut. His test career was cut short when he emigrated to England in 1932 to play in the Lancashire League as a professional.

== Biography ==
Fairfax's uncle was a top grade player, BW Fairfax.

=== Early years ===
Fairfax was a child prodigy as a player, breaking records for Kogarah School. At age 14 he made 1,942 runs and took 130 wickets over the summer.

He was soon playing for St George in grade cricket. However over the next few summers his form suffered and it seemed he would not live up to his initial promise.

His form improved over the 1927–28 summer, scoring a century against Cumberland.

Good form early in 1928–29 saw him selected for NSW Colts in October 1928. He scored 107 against Queensland Colts.

=== First Class Debut ===
Fairfax made his first class debut shortly afterwards, playing Victoria for NSW, opening the batting with Archie Jackson. He made 2 and 30 and took 1-30 and 3–45 in a drawn match.

Fairfax's second state game was against Queensland; he took 1-69 and 2-66 and scored 58 and 9.

Fairfax batted down the order against South Australia, scoring 36 and 20 and taking 4-54 and 3-82, making him New South Wales' best bowler in their victory.

Fairfax' fourth first glass game was against Victoria. He was back as opener and scored 104 in the first innings – his debut (and, as it turn out, sole) first class century, though overshone by the 340 of teammate Don Bradman. He took 0-35 and 2–54 with the ball.

According to a contemporary report:

A bowler of his years able to make runs in this way is well worthy of keen consideration. Fairfax is a hard-driving batsman, and a medium-pace bowler. With his club at first, he was inclined to bowl too fast. He has dropped to medium pace, and, as a result, has a good change of pace in. the fast ball, and is able to spin the ball at his normal pace. Besides, he is not above sending down a yorker – a ball most bowlers these days have quite forgotten.

Another writer of the time said:

Fairfax has cricket in him.- He would probably be at his best going in seventh or eighth in a crack side... He has been doing something useful with bat and ball in each representative game he has played. He has height and reach, and drives well... He... needs to tone up his running between wickets.

Fairfax impressed in a rain-shortened game against the touring English side for NSW, top scoring with 40 in the first innings and taking 3-36 opening the bowling, his victims including Jack Hobbs, Maurice Leyland and Percy Chapman.

Against South Australia, Fairfax scored 17 and 41 and took 0-47 and 4-55, bowling his team to a 60 run victory.

=== Test Debut against England ===
These consistent performances led to his selection in the fifth test against the touring English side. It had been a rapid rise, selected for international honours only a few weeks after his first class debut, but the selectors were keen to trial new players at the end of what had been a disastrous series for Australia: other debutants selected for that game included Percy Hornibrook and Tim Wall; it was only the second test for Don Bradman and Archie Jackson and the third test for Ron Oxenham. Fairfax and Oxenham played in tandem as all rounders.

One writer described Fairfax as:

Over six feet, straight as a ramrod, for one his size he is remarkably quick on his feet. Fairfax has a taking style of bowling, with a free swinging high over-arm delivery. If he cultivates some of the subtleties such as characterised H. Trumble, G. Giffen, and M. A. Noble, he may become a top-sawyer. His height and high delivery alone are deadly assets on wickets affected by rain. He is a keen field, as befits a good baseballer. As batsman, Fairfax has the fundamental of defence. On top of that, he can hit the ball as hard as any man in the game this season. And he is good at the pinch.

Fairfax had a strong debut test. When England bowled he took 1-84, the wicket being Patsy Hendren, and he took catches to dismiss Walter Hammond, George Duckworth an Maurice Leyland. When Australia batted, Fairfax came to the wicket when his team was 4-203 and took part in a record 183 run partnership with Bradman, making 65. Fairfax took 1–20 in England's second innings – the wicket of Hammond – and catches to dismiss Jack Hobbs and Maurice Tate. He was not required to bat in the second innings, with Australia winning by five wickets.

Fairfax had taken 422 first class runs tat summer at 38.36 and 25 wickets at 27.08.

That winter, Fairfax got a job in a sports store.

=== 1929–30 Season ===
Fairfax's domestic performances were solid the following summer. He scored 49 and 21 against Queensland, picking up 3–47 in both innings as New South Wales won by 23 runs.

He was picked to play the MCC, making 14 and 19 as opener and taking 4-102 and 0-7 opening the bowling. Then he played for a Bill Woodfull XI against a Jack Ryder XI; he scored 27 and 26 and took 0-116 and 0–9.

Fairfax played for NSW against South Australia, making 39 and 46 and taking 3-80 and 1-39. Against Victoria he took 0-54 then 5–104, his first five wicket haul; he made 2 and 15.

Fairfax was part of the Shield game where Bradman scored 452 and Queensland was defeated by 685 runs; Fairfax's contribution was 20 and 10 and 0–12. Against South Australia he scored 29 and took 3-43 and 4–19, helping bowl NSW to victory by an innings and 220 runs. He ended the summer for NSW with 64 and 2–44 against Victoria.

Fairfax was selected in the Australian squad that toured England in 1930, despite his underwhelming batting that summer. It was thought his bowling would be effective on English pitches.

=== 1930 Ashes Tour ===
==== Tour Games ====
Fairfax played in warm up games for the Australian XI that took place on the boat trip to England. Against Tasmania he took 4-36 and 4-43 and scored 18. In a rematch, he made 33 and took 0-19 and 1-21. In the game against WA he scored11 and took two wickets.

Fairfax's first-class debut on English soil was a tour game against Worcestershire, where he took 4-36 and 0-45 and scored a duck. He played against Leicestershire (21 and 0-38), Essex (12 and 53, 2-25 and 0–14), Lancashire (1-30 and 2-24 and 18), the MCC (1 and 26, 6-54), Derbyshire (0-23 and 1-48, 20), Surrey (28), Oxford Uni (1-15 and 1–13), Hampshire (0-22 and 0-20, 14) and Middlesex (34 and 13, 0-20 and 1-41).

==== Test Matches ====
Fairfax was picked in the first test against England, with he and Stan McCabe as all rounders in tandem. Fairfax opened the bowling with Tim Wall. In England's first innings he took 2-51 (including the wicket of Herbert Sutcliffe); he batted at number three and made 14. In the second innings he took 0-58 and scored 14 at number seven as Australia lost by 93 runs.

He played against Surrey (1-26 and 0-38, 36) and Lancashire (63 and 4-29). The latter performance in particular helped him keep his spot for the second test.

Fairfax took 4–101 in England's first innings, the wickets being Hobbs, Frank Woolley, Hendren and Gubby Allen. Batting at eight in Australia's first innings, he made 20 not out, with Bradman scoring his famous 254. Fairfax took 2–37 in England's second innings, dismissing Percy Chapman and taking a catch to get Hammond. He was not required to bat again as Australia won by seven wickets.

Fairfax fell ill and missed the third test; his place was taken by another all rounder Ted a'Beckett.

He returned for the fourth test. In Australia's first innings, Fairfax came to the wicket when the score was a tricky 5–190; he scored 49 off 208 balls and was dismissed at 8-330 – Australia scored 345. He took 0–15 in England's first innings and was not required to bat again in a rain-affected draw.

Fairfax played in matches against Glamorgan (8, 132 and 0-49), Warwickshire (1-31) and Northamptonshire (0-30, and 1).

The Ashes were still in the balance going into the fifth test, with the series at 1-1. Fairfax took 3–52 in England's first innings of 405, including Sutcliff and Bob Wyatt, as well as taking a catch to dismiss Kumar Duleepsinhji. When Australia batting, Fairfax made 53 not out off 163 balls as Australia put on 695 (Bradman 232, Ponsford 110). In England's second innings Fairfax took 1-21 (he was the bowler who dismissed Jack Hobbs in his last innings) and took catches to dismiss Hammond and Sutcliffe as Australia won by an innings and 39 runs.

He ended the tour with games against Kent (4, 0-39 and 0-22), Sussex (6 and 16, 2-41 and 0–9), and a Levenson-Gower XI (1-28 and 0-29 and 8).

It had been an excellent tour for Fairfax, who scored 150 test runs at a healthy average of 50 (helped by two not outs) and 536 first class runs at an average of 25.52 (with three half centuries). He took 12 test wickets at 27 and 41 first class wickets at 29.70 (making him Australia's fourth highest wicket taker after Grimmett, Hornibrook and Wall, outbowling the specialist Alec Hurwood). In November 1930 Don Bradman praised Fairfax as the best all rounder in Australia and said he always saved his best for the test matches.

=== 1930–31 vs West Indies ===
In 1930–31 Fairfax began the summer well for NSW against South Australia, scoring 62 and 6, and taking 0-12 and 4-54. He was picked in an Australian XI to play "the rest" taking 1-52 and 1-24 and scoring 39. He played for NSW against the touring West Indies (3-42 and 1-57, 9 and 32) and Queensland (3 and 18, 0-76).

He kept his place in the test side for the first test against the West Indies. He opened the bowling again with Wall making 0-36 then scored 41 not out in Australia's first innings. He took 0–6 in the West Indies' second innings and was not required to bat again as Australia won by ten wickets. Fairfax played for NSW against South Australia (38, 0-23 and 0–7) and Victoria (4-41 and 3).

In the second test Fairfax scored 15 and he took 3-19 (including the wicket of George Headley) and 0–21 in a game Australia on by an innings and 172 runs. He played for NSW against Victoria, making 46 and 12, taking 2-68 and 0–14.

Australia won the third test by an innings and 217 runs; Fairfax scored 9 and took 0-13 and 0–6. In the fourth test Fairfax took 0–14 in the first innings but 4–31 in the second; he made 16 with the bat in a game where Australia won by an innings and 122 runs.

The West Indies fought back in the fifth test, scoring 6-350 declared in their first innings, with Fairfax going for 0-60. Australia collapsed in response to be 5-89 when Fairfax came to the wicket; he scored 54 over 116 minutes, taking the team to 215 when he was out. Australia made 224 all up with Fairfax the top score. Fairfax did not bowl in West Indies' second innings where they declared at 5–124. Australia collapsed again and were 5-65 when Fairfax came out to bat – he top scored again, with 60 not out over 147 minutes, but Australia were dismissed for 220 and lost the game by 30 runs.

Fairfax finished the summer with 463 first class runs at 35.61 (with three 50s) and 23 wickets at 29.39, with a best of 4-31.

=== Move to England ===
Fairfax had been unable to find a job in the Depression. In November 1931 it was announced he had signed a deal to play as a professional for Accrington in the Lancashire League at £20 a week. He was to leave in March but he ruled himself out of international cricket.

He only played two first class games in Australia that summer both for NSW, one against Queensland (1-21 and 2-24, 5) and the touring South Africans (0-62 and 0–5, 3). He was not available for the tests against South Africa – Ron Oxenham took his place. It was a relatively uncontroversial decision at the time – something Don Bradman brought up in 1932–33 when he was much criticised for considering an offer to play league cricket.

Fairfax played in the Lancashire League for two summers. In 1932 he made 738 runs at 32.08 and took 43 wickets at 20.11. In 1933 he made 952 runs at 52.88 and took 51 wickets at 16.45.

=== Post-playing career ===
In 1934 Fairfax set up an indoor cricket school in London which he run until 1937 when it closed. He played his last first-class game in 1934, for the Gentlemen against the Players, scoring 15 and taking 0–102.

In 1937, Fairfax coached at Eton College. He also worked for Sir Julius Cahn's private team. During the year, he also criticised Don Bradman's captaincy of the Australia team.

In 1939, he coached Notts County Football Club.

During World War II, Fairfax was a pilot officer in the RAF. He wound up a patient in a sanitorium, where he met the King in June 1946. According to one report his health never recovered from the war.

After the war, he worked for a London Sunday newspaper and continued to coach all year round at schools, running clinics. He returned to Australia over the 1950–51 summer to cover the Ashes for English newspapers. He also attended games during the 1953 Ashes and continued to write on cricket matters.

Fairax suffered health problems from an injury incurred during the war. He fell ill just before Christmas 1954 and died in May 1955 at age 48. According to one report, "There will never be another Alan Fairfax. He was a cricket zealot, the shrewdest of all judges of a player and probably the finest coach in the world."
