= Ron Headley =

Jamaican cricketer (born 1939)

Personal information
- Full name: Ronald George Alphonso Headley
- Born: 29 June 1939 (age 87); Kingston, Colony of Jamaica
- Batting: Left-handed
- Bowling: Leg break
- Relatives: George Headley (father); Dean Headley (son)

International information
- National side: West Indies
- Test debut (cap 147): 26 July 1973 v England
- Last Test: 9 August 1973 v England
- Only ODI (cap 12): 7 September 1973 v England

Domestic team information
- Years: Team
- 1958–1974: Worcestershire
- 1965–1974: Jamaica
- 1975–1976: Derbyshire

Career statistics
Competition	Tests	ODIs	FC	LA
Matches	2	1	423	162
Runs scored	62	19	21,695	4,788
Batting average	15.50	19.00	31.12	32.35
100s/50s	0/0	0/0	32/117	2/30
Top score	42	19	187	132
Balls bowled	0	0	1,232	0
Wickets	–	–	12	–
Bowling average	–	–	49.00	–
5 wickets in innings	–	–	0	–
10 wickets in match	–	–	0	–
Best bowling	–	–	4/40	–
Catches/stumpings	2/–	0/–	356/–	58/–
- Source: Cricket Archive, 17 October 2010

Ronald George Alphonso Headley (born 29 June 1939) is a former Jamaican cricketer who played in two Tests and one ODI in 1973. An opening batsman, in first-class cricket he scored 21,695 runs at an average of 31.12, with 32 hundreds and a highest score of 187.

Headley moved to England at age 11: his father George Headley, who played 22 Tests for West Indies, was the professional at Dudley Cricket Club. He spent most of his career in England, playing for Worcestershire from 1958 to 1974. He was capped by the county in 1961, and was awarded a benefit season in 1972 which raised just over £10,000. In 1971 he scored 187 and 108 against Northamptonshire, becoming the first Worcestershire player to score a century in both innings of a first-class match since Edwin Cooper in 1946.

Headley was eligible to play for England: indeed, his father discouraged him from playing for the West Indies because he believed that the West Indies Board treated their players badly. But in 1973, following an injury to Steve Camacho, Headley was co-opted from Worcestershire into the West Indies touring team. He played seven first-class matches for the West Indians, including the first and second matches of a three-match Test series. His 42 in the second innings of the first match was his highest Test score. He also played in the second of two One Day International matches for the Prudential Trophy.

After retiring from playing, Headley went into coaching.

His son Dean Headley played 15 Tests and 13 ODIs for England. This was the first case of three consecutive generations of the same family (George, Ron and Dean Headley) playing Test cricket.
