= Lucas Cricket Club =

- One Day name: Eagles

Team information
- Founded: 1895
- Home ground: Lucas Cricket Club Ground

History
- Senior Cup wins: 1904, 1905, 1906, 1911, 1913, 1914, 1915, 1917, 1932, 1938, 1939, 1940, 1941, 1944, 1945, 1954, 1971, 1999

Lucas Cricket Club is a cricket club in Kingston, Jamaica. The club was founded in 1895 as the Jamaica Cricket Club by ex-students of Calabar Elementary School, organised by David Ellington, a hackney cab driver. Robert Slade Lucas, the captain of a team from England visiting Jamaica at the time, donated equipment to assist in the establishment of the fledgling club. In 1898, the club renamed itself to honour Lucas' role in its foundation.

The formation of the club has been described as "the most important event in the history of the island game" as it provided an avenue for poor black cricketers to play the game, leading it to becoming the national sport of Jamaica.

The club's performance in the lower division of Jamaican cricket soon saw them offered a position in the Senior Cup, the premier cricket competition in Jamaica. The club was almost instantly successful, finishing runners-up in 1903 and winning in 1904, 1905 and 1906.

Famous cricketers who have played for Lucas CC include:

- George Headley.
- Frank Worrell.
- Chris Gayle.
