= Alfred Scott (West Indian cricketer) =

Jamaican cricketer (1934–2018)

Personal information
- Full name: Alfred Homer Patrick Scott
- Born: 29 July 1934; Spanish Town, St Catherine, Jamaica
- Died: 28 April 2018 (aged 83); New York, U.S.
- Batting: Right-handed
- Bowling: Right-arm leg-break
- Relatives: Tommy Scott (father)

International information
- National side: West Indies

Domestic team information
- Years: Team
- 1952-53 to 1953-54: Jamaica

Career statistics
Competition	Tests	First-class
Matches	1	5
Runs scored	5	38
Batting average	5.00	12.66
100s/50s	0/0	0/0
Top score	5	17*
Balls bowled	264	1195
Wickets	0	18
Bowling average	-	33.00
5 wickets in innings	0	0
10 wickets in match	0	0
Best bowling	–	4/46
Catches/stumpings	0/0	3/0
- Source: Cricinfo, 27 April 2019

Alfred Homer Patrick Scott (29 July 1934 – 28 April 2018) was a West Indian cricketer who played in one Test in 1953.

Alfred Scott was a leg-break bowler and a lower-order batsman whose first-class cricket career was over before he was 20. In his third first-class match for Jamaica, against the Indian touring side in March 1953, at the age of 18, he took seven wickets with his leg-breaks and outperformed Alf Valentine, the established West Indies and Jamaica spinner. He was then selected alongside Valentine for the fifth and final Test match of the series, which took place at Kingston immediately after the Jamaica game. On a batsman's pitch, Scott achieved no success at all, his 44 overs costing 140 runs.

After this Test appearance, Scott played only one further first-class match: one of the two tour games for Jamaica against the MCC team in 1953-54, in which he took two wickets.

Scott moved to England to play league cricket, then later migrated to the United States. He died in New York on 28 April 2018, at the age of 83.
