= Melbourne Cricket Club (Jamaica) =

Cricket club

- One Day name: Kangaroos

Team information
- Founded: 1892
- Home ground: Melbourne Oval

History
- Senior Cup wins: 1908, 1909, 1912, 1919, 1929, 1935, 1952, 1968, 1969, 1972, 1974, 1975*, 1978, 1980, 1981, 1988, 1989, 1991, 1992, 1996, 1998, 2000

Melbourne Cricket Club is a cricket club based in the city of Kingston, Jamaica. The club was established on 3 May 1892 to provide a club for men of "modest means". It was the third cricket club established in Kingston, after Kingston Cricket Club and Kensington Cricket Club. In that time the club has produced 13 cricketers who represented the West Indies and another 27 players who have represented Jamaica.

Melbourne has traditionally been one of the strongest clubs in Jamaica, winning the Kingston competition (Senior Cup) seven years in a row but was less successful in the early 2000s.

Cricketers from Melbourne CC who have represented the West Indies include:

- Michael Holding
- Courtney Walsh
- Marlon Samuels
- Carlton Baugh
