= Alec Hurwood =

Australian cricketer

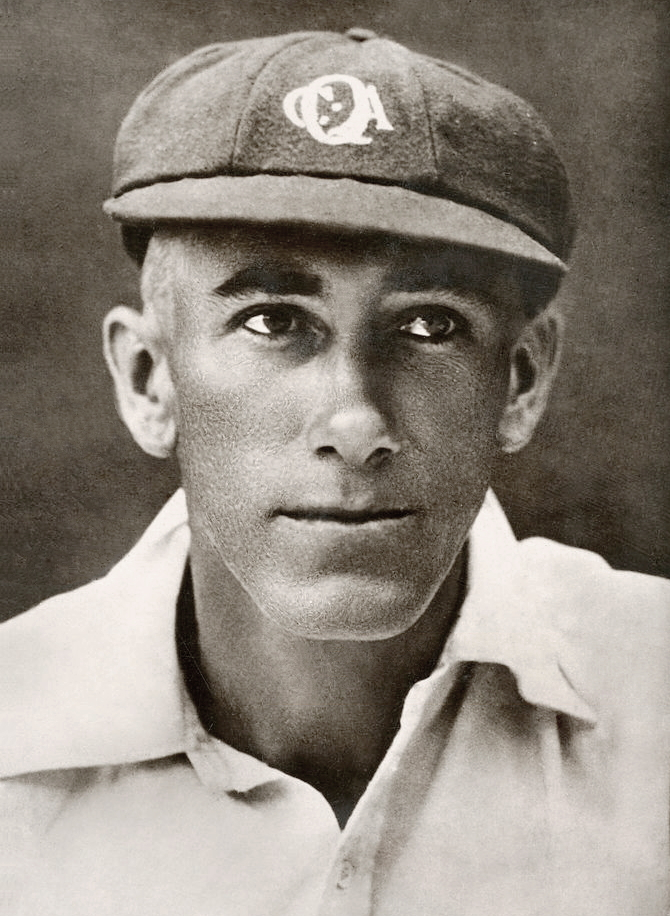

Personal information
- Full name: Alexander Hurwood
- Born: 17 June 1902; Kangaroo Point, Brisbane, Queensland, Australia
- Died: 26 September 1982 (aged 80); Coffs Harbour, New South Wales, Australia
- Batting: Right-handed
- Bowling: Right-arm medium-paced off-spin

International information
- National side: Australia
- Test debut (cap 135): 12 December 1930 v West Indies
- Last Test: 1 January 1931 v West Indies

Domestic team information
- Years: Team
- 1925–26 to 1931–32: Queensland

Career statistics
Competition	Tests	First-class
Matches	2	43
Runs scored	5	575
Batting average	2.50	11.27
100s/50s	0/0	0/3
Top score	5	89
Balls bowled	517	7864
Wickets	11	113
Bowling average	15.45	27.62
5 wickets in innings	0	5
10 wickets in match	0	1
Best bowling	4/22	6/80
Catches/stumpings	2/–	29/–
- Source: Cricinfo, 29 April 2021

Alexander Hurwood (17 June 1902 – 26 September 1982), was an Australian cricketer who played in two Tests in the 1930–31 season.

Hurwood was born in Brisbane and educated at Brisbane Grammar School. Renowned for his odd bowling style – taking only a couple of steps before delivering the ball – Hurwood was a medium-paced off-spinner. He played several seasons for Queensland before being called up to the Australian Test team. He had his most successful season in 1929–30, taking 46 wickets at an average of 19.84. He took 6 for 179 when Don Bradman made 452 not out in January 1930. In his next match, two weeks later, Hurwood took his best figures of 6 for 80 against South Australia.

Hurwood toured England with the Australian team in 1930 but did not get many opportunities and took only 28 wickets in 20 first-class matches, and did not play in any of the five Tests. He played in the first two Tests against West Indies in 1930-31, taking 11 wickets, and was considered unlucky to be dropped in favour of bowlers returning to the team from injury. He moved to Melbourne in 1932 and played no more first-class cricket.

Hurwood served in World War II, first as an anti-aircraft gunner in the army from 1940 to 1942, then as a flight lieutenant with the RAAF from 1942 to 1945.

Hurwood and his wife Norma married in 1945 and had three children. When he retired in 1973 they returned to Queensland.
