= Dean Headley =

English cricketer (born 1970)

Personal information
- Full name: Dean Warren Headley
- Born: 27 January 1970 (age 56); Norton, Worcestershire, England
- Batting: Right-handed
- Bowling: Right-arm fast-medium
- Role: Bowler
- Relatives: Ron Headley (father); George Headley (grandfather)

International information
- National side: England
- Test debut (cap 585): 3 July 1997 v Australia
- Last Test: 5 August 1999 v New Zealand
- ODI debut (cap 139): 29 August 1996 v Pakistan
- Last ODI: 29 January 1999 v Sri Lanka

Domestic team information
- Years: Team
- 1991–1992: Middlesex
- 1992–1999: Kent

Career statistics
Competition	Test	ODI	FC	LA
Matches	15	13	139	166
Runs scored	186	22	2,373	352
Batting average	8.45	11.00	16.59	12.57
100s/50s	0/0	0/0	0/6	0/0
Top score	31	10*	91	29*
Balls bowled	3,026	594	25,801	7,738
Wickets	60	11	466	204
Bowling average	27.85	47.27	28.52	27.16
5 wickets in innings	1	0	25	3
10 wickets in match	0	0	2	0
Best bowling	6/60	2/38	8/98	6/42
Catches/stumpings	7/–	3/–	60/–	29/–
- Source: CricInfo, 2 September 2008

Dean Warren Headley (born 27 January 1970) is a former English professional cricketer who played as a right-arm fast bowler for the England cricket team. Domestically he played for Middlesex and Kent County Cricket Clubs. Headley is now an ECB match referee and the current director of cricket at Blundell's School.

== Playing career ==
Headley was born in Stourbridge and comes from a famous cricketing family, being the son of Ron Headley and grandson of George Headley. He was the first Test cricketer to be both the son and grandson of Test cricketers. He was educated at Old Swinford Hospital and then Royal Grammar School Worcester where he excelled at rugby union and cricket.

He played for Worcestershire's second team in 1989, and played as a professional for Leycett Cricket Club based in Leycett just outside Newcastle-under-Lyme, Staffordshire, but his senior debut was in 1991 after he had moved to Middlesex. Clive Lloyd helped him a lot in those early years. In 1993 he moved counties again, this time to Kent. Whilst at Kent he was selected for England, playing Test and ODI cricket between 1996 and 1999. One of his greatest moments was when he won the Man of the Match award for his performance in the 4th Ashes Test in 1998 at Melbourne: Australia was making light work of chasing a target of 175, before Headley took four wickets in three overs to reduce Australia from 130/3 to 140/7; he finished with 6/60 in the innings and England won by 12 runs, their only Test victory on that tour. Due to injury he retired from cricket in 2001.

He played club cricket for Upchurch Cricket Club in Upchurch, Kent and worked as a cricket coach at Stamford School.

== World record ==
On 14 September 1996, Dean Headley equalled a world record by taking three hat-tricks in a single English county season. He achieved this feat against Hampshire in Canterbury. He equalled the world record earlier set by Charlie Parker in 1924 and J.S. Rao in 1963–64.

== Personal life ==
The father of three children, Headley enjoys rugby, football, hockey, and golf in his spare time. He's also a fan of English football side West Bromwich Albion.
