= Michael Holding =

Jamaican cricketer and commentator (born 1954)

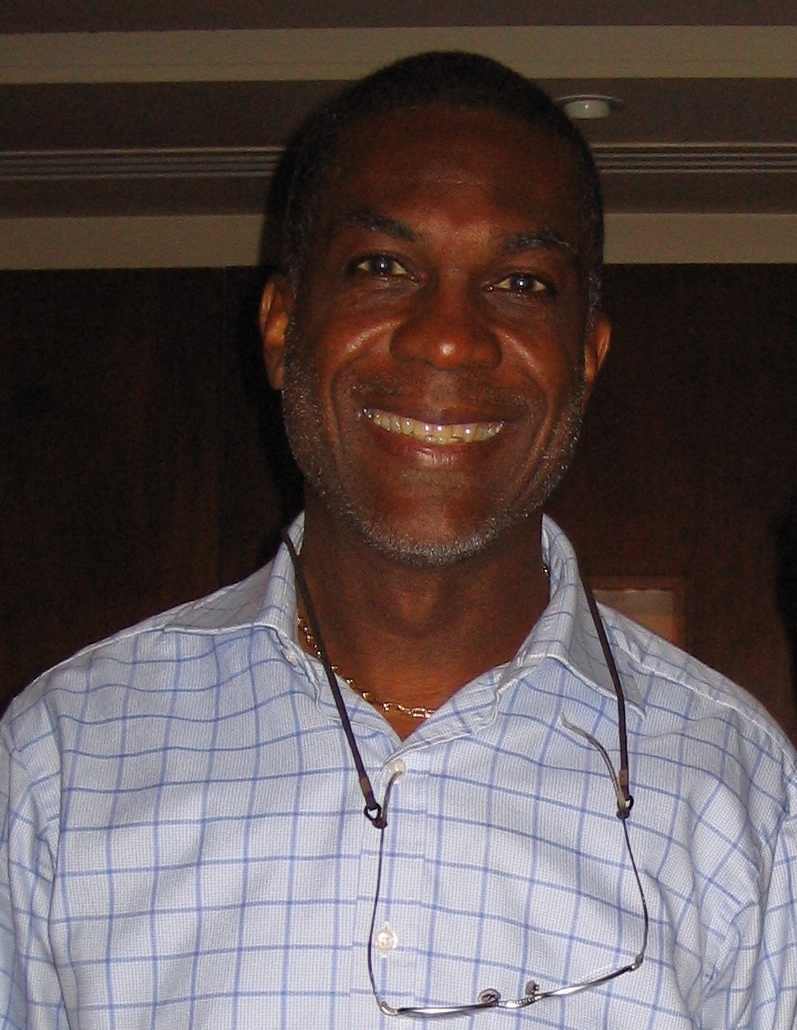

Personal information
- Full name: Michael Anthony Holding
- Born: 16 February 1954 (age 72); Kingston, Jamaica
- Nickname: Whispering Death, Mikey
- Height: 6 ft 3.5 in (192 cm)
- Batting: Right-handed
- Bowling: Right-arm fast
- Role: Bowler

International information
- National side: West Indies (1975-1987)
- Test debut (cap 153): 28 November 1975 v Australia
- Last Test: 24 February 1987 v New Zealand
- ODI debut (cap 18): 26 August 1976 v England
- Last ODI: 30 January 1987 v England

Domestic team information
- Years: Team
- 1973–1989: Jamaica
- 1981: Lancashire
- 1982/83: Tasmania
- 1983–1989: Derbyshire
- 1987/88: Canterbury

Career statistics
Competition	Test	ODI	FC	LA
Matches	60	102	222	249
Runs scored	910	282	3,600	1,575
Batting average	13.78	9.09	15.00	12.30
100s/50s	0/6	0/2	0/14	0/7
Top score	73	64	80	69
Balls bowled	12,680	5,473	38,877	12,662
Wickets	249	142	778	343
Bowling average	23.68	21.36	23.43	20.62
5 wickets in innings	13	1	39	3
10 wickets in match	2	0	5	0
Best bowling	8/92	5/26	8/92	8/21
Catches/stumpings	22/–	30/–	125/–	81/–
Medal record
Men's Cricket
Representing West Indies
ICC Cricket World Cup
Winner	1979 England
Runner-up	1983 England and Wales
- Source: CricInfo, 24 May 2009

Michael Anthony Holding (born 16 February 1954) is a Jamaican former cricketer and commentator who played for the West Indies cricket team. Widely regarded as one of the greatest pace bowlers in cricket history, he was nicknamed "Whispering Death" due to his undramatic but effective bowling style.

Holding was a key member of the West Indies team that won the 1979 Cricket World Cup, as well as finishing as runners-up at the 1983 Cricket World Cup. He took the most wickets for his team at the 1979 tournament. His bowling action was renowned for being smooth and extremely fast, and he used his height (192 cm (6 ft 4 in)) to generate large amounts of bounce and zip off the pitch. He was part of the fearsome West Indian pace bowling battery, together with Andy Roberts, Joel Garner, Colin Croft, Wayne Daniel, Malcolm Marshall and Sylvester Clarke, that devastated opposing batting line-ups throughout the world in the late seventies and early eighties. Early in his Test career, in 1976, Holding broke the record for best bowling figures in a Test match by a West Indies bowler, 14 wickets for 149 runs (14/149). The record still stands.

During his first-class cricket career, Holding played for Jamaica, Canterbury, Derbyshire, Lancashire, and Tasmania. In September 2021, Holding announced his retirement from being a commentator.

== Early life ==
Michael Anthony Holding was born on 16 February 1954, the youngest of four children to Ralph and Enid Holding who lived in Half Way Tree, Kingston. In an interview in 2020, Holding stated that his mother's family disowned her because her husband's skin was too dark. The family was passionate about sport, and only a few years after Michael was born his father enrolled him as a member of Melbourne Cricket Club in Kingston. At the age of three he was diagnosed with asthma, but by his early teenage years this had passed and he no longer needed an inhaler. He led an active life, playing sport in the scrubland and wooded areas near his home. Though his family would often watch the cricket at Sabina Park, Holding preferred to play rather than watch.

== Cricketing career ==
=== Early career ===
In late 1975 the West Indies team embarked on a six-Test tour of Australia. Earlier that year the West Indies had defeated Australia in the final of the inaugural World Cup, and the teams were considered to be the best of their day. Fast bowler Bernard Julien was out of form and his place in the team was given to debutant Michael Holding who opened the bowling with Andy Roberts. He picked up a groin strain in the second Test and bowled as fast as 97 miles per hour (156 km/h), quicker than Jeff Thomson, Australia's fastest bowler. According to Wisden in his debut series, Holding "had shown himself to be Roberts' natural opening partner" and indeed was timed to be faster than Jeff Thomson, Dennis Lillee and Andy Roberts, and considered that when West Indies captain Clive Lloyd chose to give Julien the new ball rather than Holding it was a mistake that cost the West Indies the match. Australia won the series 5–1, and though Holding's 10 wickets in 5 matches cost on average more than 60 runs each, Wisden believed that he had performed well enough to establish himself in the side and had the potential to bowl faster still.

India visited the West Indies in March for a four-Test series. The defeat by Australia had left Andy Roberts exhausted, so he was rested for the matches against India and Holding took over as leader of the West Indies bowling attack. He finished as his team's leading wicket taker (second in the series to Indian leg spinner B. S. Chandrasekhar) with 19 wickets at less than 20 runs each and helped his team to a 2–1 victory.

The West Indies toured England in 1976, and though Holding was largely unknown in the country, the British press noted his performance in Australia and there was a sense of anticipation about his bowling. An early psychological blow was landed by the West Indies in a warm up match against the M.C.C. when Holding struck Dennis Amiss on the head, leaving a wound that needed stitches. Amiss was a veteran player and was likely to open for England in the forthcoming Tests and seeing him struggle against Holding's pace was a warning of things to come. In the lead up to the series, the South African-born England captain Tony Greig was very confident of his team's chances, saying in an interview "I like to think people are building these West Indians up, because I'm not really sure they're as good as everyone thinks. You must remember, that the West Indians, these guys, if they get on top they are magnificent cricketers. But if they're down, they grovel, and I intend, with the help of Closey (Brian Close) and a few others, to make them grovel." His comments outraged the West Indians, and to many the use of the term "grovel" in particular was highly offensive, as it "smacked of racism and apartheid".

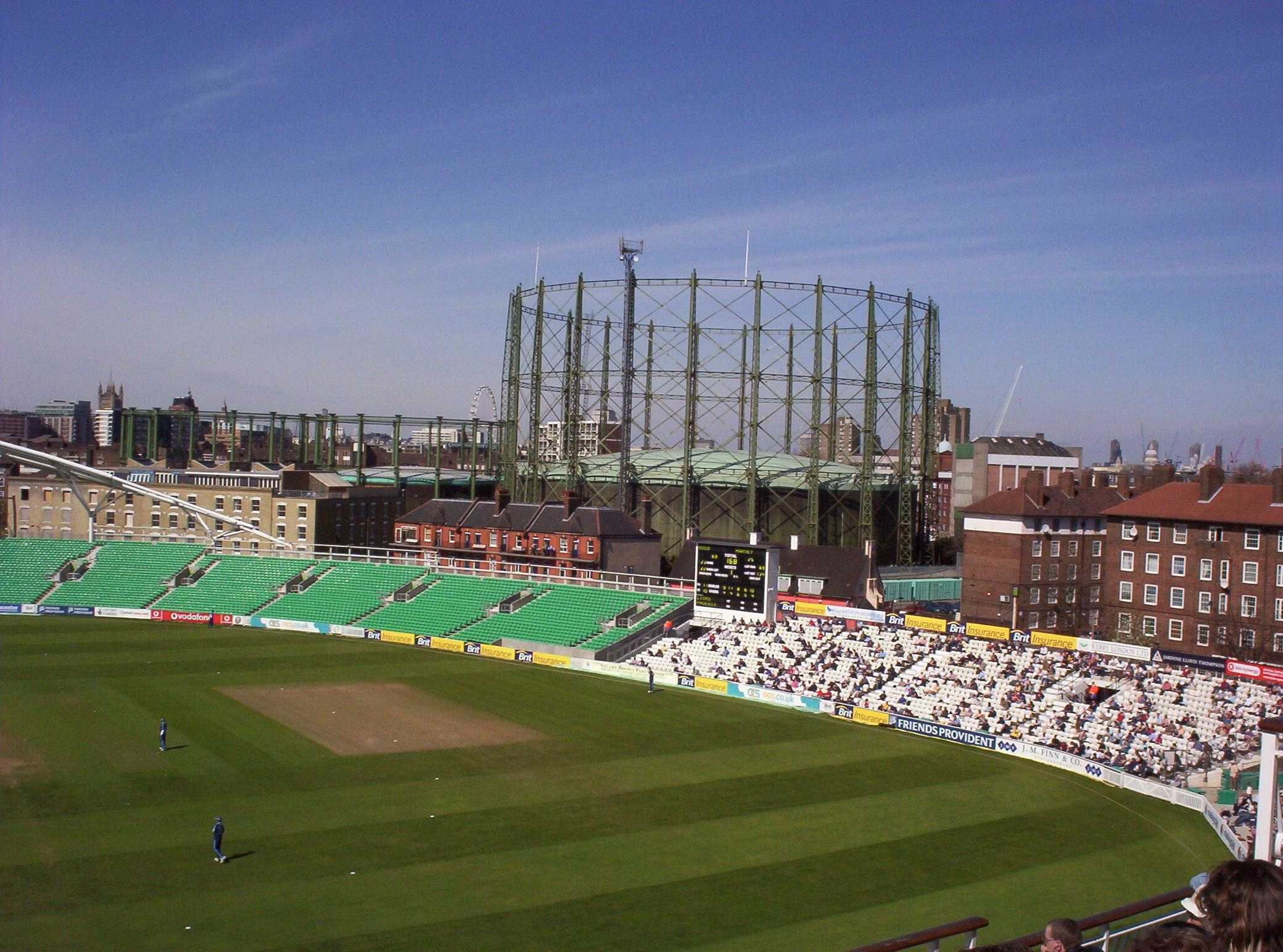
Michael Holding took career-best bowling figures of 8–92 at the Oval against England in 1976. It was his 13th Test.

The West Indies fast bowling attack consisted of Roberts, Holding, Wayne Daniel, and Vanburn Holder. The first three used the bouncer liberally (Wisden notes that Holding in particular bowled "exceptionally fast"), and England's experienced John Edrich and Brian Close suffered in particular, both being struck on the torso many times (Close was already 45 when the series started in June, and Edrich turned 39 during the second Test). In the first innings of the fifth Test, played at the Oval, Holding took 8 wickets for 92 runs which remained the best bowling figures of his first-class career and were the best bowling figures by a West Indies bowler at the ground. He took a further 6 wickets in the match to finish with 14/149, which remain the best match figures by a West Indian in a Test match. The West Indies won the five match series 3–0.

According to an urban myth, during a Test match between the West Indies and England when Holding was to bowl to English player Peter Willey, the BBC radio commentator at the time, Brian Johnston, described the action as "The bowler's Holding, the batsman's Willey" (a double entendre, as "willy" is British English slang for a penis). However Wisden states that there is no record of Johnston or anyone else actually saying this (although a colleague of Johnston's, Henry Blofeld, has said he recalls the incident occurring during a Test match at The Oval in 1976.) In a limited-overs international between England and West Indies on 26 August 1976 at Scarborough, Michael Holding's return from long-leg deflected off the nearer wicket, breaking the bails, and then scuttled along the pitch to also break the far wicket, with Graham Barlow and Alan Knott, on his only appearance as England's captain, stranded in mid-pitch. This highly unusual occurrence of both wickets being broken by one throw dumbfounded the umpires, David Constant and Arthur Jepson, who rejected the run-out appeal for unknown reasons. The West Indies played 26 first-class matches on the tour, winning 18 and losing only two, making them the most successful side ever to tour England.

=== World Series Cricket ===
An Australian Broadcasting Corporation news report of the first WSC match

After the 1976 series against England, Holding enrolled at the University of the West Indies on a scholarship to study Computer Science. As a profession, cricket did not pay particularly well at the time, even for the stars of the sport, and Holding was preparing himself for employment after his retirement. A shoulder injury sustained towards the end of the 1976 tour of England prevented Holding from joining the West Indies squad to face Pakistan in March 1977. During the series Lloyd approached Holding about a joining a proposed World XI team, captained by England's Tony Greig, to play against Australia in World Series Cricket; at the time there was still animosity between Greig and the West Indies players over Greig's 'grovel' comment before the 1976 Test series in England. The series was the brainchild of Kerry Packer after his television channel, Channel 9, had missed out on the rights to broadcast Australia's home Test series. Players would be paid much more than they had been before, and with his earnings from the series Holding was able to buy his first car and later a house. When the World Series Cricket plan became public, the Australian Cricket Board and England Cricket Board both threatened to ban any of their players taking part. Packer responded to the pressure by signing the whole West Indies team to compete in the series alongside a World XI and an Australian team. Relegated to playing at football grounds rather than cricket stadiums, the series initially suffered from poor crowds. The negative press surrounding the World Series – players were labelled mercenaries – bred a sense of camaraderie in the West Indies side, which contributed to the team's dominance in the Test arena for years to come.

In March 1978, after the first season of World Series Cricket, Australia embarked on a Test tour of the West Indies. Australia were severely depleted because the ACB refused to pick leading players such as Greg Chappell, Ian Chappell, and Dennis Lillee because they had played in the Packer series. Holding suffered a recurrence of his shoulder injury and so missed the series, but otherwise the West Indies began the series at full strength. Eventually external pressure on the West Indies Cricket Board (WICB) not to select players who played in the World Series resulted in three players being dropped and Clive Lloyd's resignation as captain. The rest of the team refused to play in protest and were replaced by second-choice players. The second year of World Series Cricket was more successful than the first and matches were played in front of much larger crowds. Though contracted to last three years, the competition ended after two because Packer and the ACB came to an agreement regarding broadcasting rights.

=== West Indies rampant ===
A less amusing incident for which Holding is also remembered was kicking over the stumps in anger at an umpiring decision in New Zealand in 1979/80. The tour had gone poorly almost from the beginning: West Indies had just finished a long, arduous tour of Australia, and were perhaps resentful about having an additional tour to New Zealand immediately afterwards (their leading batsman of the time, Viv Richards, refused to tour). West Indies felt that the umpiring had been largely incompetent and against them throughout. After an appeal for caught behind was turned down, Holding turned and kicked the stumps in frustration.

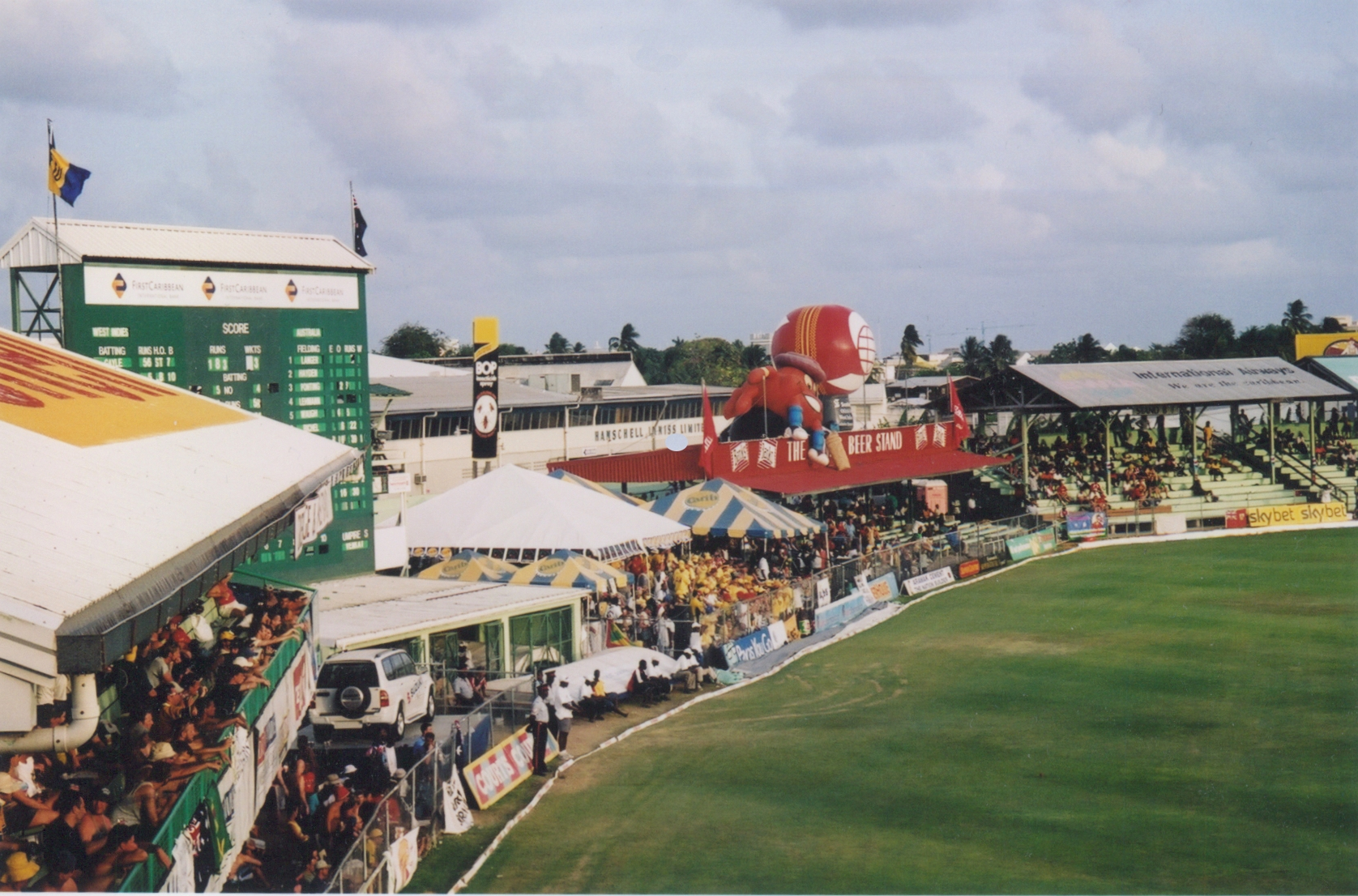
The Kensington Oval, Barbados, where Holding bowled a fearsome over to a 40-year-old Geoffrey Boycott

Holding was the bowler in what is often described as "the greatest over in Test history", which he bowled in 1981 in Bridgetown to English batsman Geoff Boycott, a highly experienced player who was considered to be somewhat reluctant to face very fast bowling. Holding's first five deliveries each increased in pace, causing Boycott to have to react very rapidly and awkwardly to avoid being hit. The final ball simply beat him for speed and Boycott was unable to react at all, being clean bowled to the great delight of the crowd. Boycott later described the experience as one "I wouldn't wish on my worst enemy."

In 1984, batting with Viv Richards, Holding set the record for the highest 10th wicket partnership in ODI history(106*)

Holding opened the bowling for West Indies with Andy Roberts in 33 Tests, and the pair became a feared bowling partnership. They claimed 216 wickets at an average of 25.27 runs each, making them one of the most successful new ball partnerships of all time.

In 2009, Rudi Webster said "It is difficult to overestimate how much the players in [the West Indies team led by Clive Lloyd] were admired and idolised on the cricket field. And off the field they were loved and respected for the manner in which they conducted themselves and for the role they played as outstanding ambassadors." The Federation of International Cricketers' Associations inaugurated a Hall of Fame in 1999 and Holding was inducted into it. The FICA Hall of Fame ended in 2003, but all the inductees were given official recognition when they were included in the ICC's Hall of Fame on its inauguration in 2009.

== Post-playing career ==
Holding has written two autobiographies, the first of which, Whispering Death, was published in 1988 before he retired; and the second, No Holding Back, over 20 years later in 2010. In July 2021, Holding's third book—Why We Kneel, How We Rise—was published. Prompted by the positive public reaction to his comments, the book expands upon his theme of how institutionalised racism developed historically and how it affects people of colour, and includes contributions from notable sports stars such as Usain Bolt, Thierry Henry, Michael Johnson and Naomi Osaka. After retiring from cricket, Holding owned a petrol station in Kingston called "Michael Holding's Service Centre", employing several people who were members of Melbourne Cricket Club of which he was a member. The business was initially successful, though Holding found it stressful. Broadcasting began to take up more of his time, and while he was away the petrol station suffered so in 1995 he decided to sell. He also considered taking up umpiring, though not as a profession, and considered pursuing qualifications to umpire in domestic matches in Jamaica but his time was taken up with managing the petrol station and broadcasting.

=== Broadcaster and ICC official ===
Holding's career evolved after his retirement from active play. He had never aspired to becoming a commentator but was friends with a producer at Radio Jamaica who invited him to comment on cricket. This led to him working around the Caribbean, but at this stage work was not regular enough to be his main source of income. Holding made his transition from radio commentator to television in 1990 when cricket in the Caribbean was broadcast on television around the world for the first time. Two local commentators were chosen and Holding was picked alongside Tony Cozier at the latter's recommendation.

The ICC created the Bowling Action Review Committee (BARC) in 1999, and on the recommendation of the WICB, Holding was one of the founding members of the committee. The role of the committee was to monitor players suspected of throwing using various video replays. The process of assessing a bowler's action has since become more scientific with more technology used and though the committee disbanded in 2005 it was influential in the ICC establishing the 15-degree maximum for bowlers straightening their arms in delivery. Even when working for the BARC, Holding was a strident critic of the ICC so in 2007 when he was approached to join the newly formed ICC cricket committee he thought a friend was playing a joke on him. Holding joined the committee and though he was initially optimistic quit in July 2008 in protest against the ICC's decision to overturn the result of the Oval Test between Pakistan and England, which was changed from a forfeit by Pakistan (who chose not to take the field in protest against being accused of ball tampering) to a draw. The forfeiture was later reinstated, and Holding resolved not to rejoin the committee.

=== Criticism on T20 cricket ===
Michael Holding has repeatedly and strongly criticized T20 cricket. Holding has stated "I don't think [twenty20] is good for the game... It has its place but it will be bad unless those in charge manage it properly and I do not think they can because they are blinded by money. I can see Test cricket dying because of this." Despite this he was initially supportive of the Stanford 20/20, believing that the tournament funded by Allen Stanford, who had pledged to put large sums of money into domestic West Indies cricket, could revitalize the long time poorly funded domestic Caribbean cricket scene (the on-field fortunes of the West Indies team had declined rapidly from the mid 1990s onwards). However, with the conception of the Stanford Super Series involving the England Cricket Board in 2008 he became critical of the venture, as he felt that funds which had previously been invested in domestic teams were no longer of any interest to Stanford.

Regarding the IPL, Holding criticized West Indies players such as Jerome Taylor and Chris Gayle who were partaking the 2011 IPL season, rather than playing for their national sides during the home series against Pakistan at the time. He also criticized the West Indies Cricket Board for being too soft by allowing West Indian players to play the IPL, and giving them NOCs with ease. Holding also accused the BCCI for having too much power, and believed they were the main reason for the decline of the West Indies team as they promoted the IPL, and they were dictating the ICC.

Holding, on numerous occasions, has stated that he does not consider the T20 format should even be classed as cricket. He has also stated that it is very difficult for West Indies cricket to return to the top in Test cricket because of T20 and its financial lure to the region's best players.

=== Criticism of the BCCI ===
Michael Holding has been a vocal critic of the Board of Control for Cricket in India (BCCI) due to its disproportionate influence in global cricket. He argues that the financial power of the BCCI enables it to dominate the International Cricket Council (ICC), thus undermining the democratic governance of the sport. Holding believes that no single nation should have such control over the direction of cricket, and he frequently compares this situation to football, where FIFA prevents one nation from exerting undue influence. In particular, Holding has criticized the BCCI's stance on the Decision Review System (DRS), highlighting how India's objections to the system swayed the ICC's decision-making. He advocated for reforms in cricket governance to prevent the financial dominance of boards like the BCCI from undermining the integrity of the sport. Holding has also expressed frustration with the dominance of the Indian Premier League (IPL), asserting that the BCCI’s control over the tournament compromises the governance of world cricket. In a candid remark, he noted: "I don't think one copy (of his book) will be sold in India, because I have nothing good to say about the BCCI and what they are doing with world cricket." He further criticized the IPL's scheduling, stating, "You will never see IPL clashing with an Indian series, never. So they (ICC) are never effective, and the ICC just allows them (BCCI) to run it how they like." Holding has long called for more equitable governance of the sport to prevent financial interests from overshadowing its true competitive spirit.

=== Anti-racism ===
In July 2020, during a rain delay in the England v West Indies Test series, Holding was asked on Sky Sports by Ian Ward for his thoughts on the pre-match kneeling of both teams in respect of the Black Lives Matter movement. His widely reported comments on his personal experience of, and his views on, institutionalised racism were widely welcomed as moving, sincere, and eloquently constructive.

== Personal life ==
Holding's first marriage was to Cherine Holding, a Sri Lankan, whom he met when touring Australia in the late 1970s. Their son was born in 1981. He is now married to Laurie-Ann Holding, an indigenous Antiguan; they have no children together. Holding has also fathered three other children from three other relationships, including a daughter born in 1979, and another daughter in 1988, both of whom have Jamaican mothers. During the COVID-19 pandemic, Holding spent much of his time in the Cayman Islands.

== Recognition ==
In June 1988, Holding was featured on the $2 Jamaican stamp alongside the Barbados Cricket Buckle.

In May 2013, he received an Honorary Degree and Lifetime Achievement Award at the University of East London.
