= George Headley =

Jamaican cricketer (1909–1983)

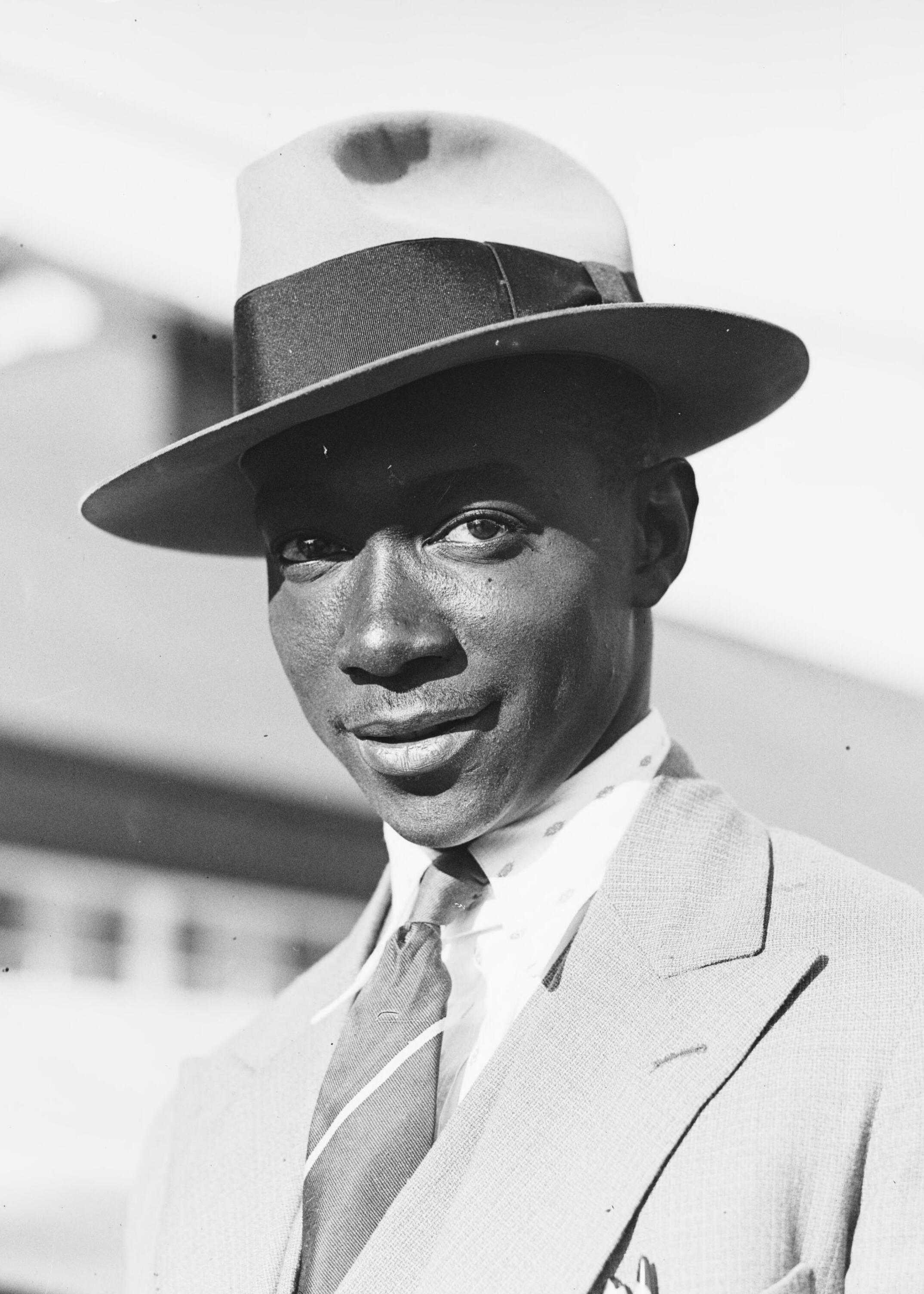
- Headley in 1930–31

Personal information
- Born: 30 May 1909; Colón, Panama
- Died: 30 November 1983 (aged 74); Kingston, Jamaica
- Nickname: Atlas, the Black Bradman
- Batting: Right-handed
- Bowling: Right arm leg break
- Role: Batsman
- Relatives: Ron Headley (son) Dean Headley (grandson)

International information
- National side: West Indies
- Test debut (cap 17): 11 January 1930 v England
- Last Test: 21 January 1954 v England

Domestic team information
- Years: Team
- 1927–1954: Jamaica

Career statistics
Competition	Test	First-class
Matches	22	103
Runs scored	2,190	9,921
Batting average	60.83	69.86
100s/50s	10/5	33/44
Top score	270*	344*
Balls bowled	398	4,201
Wickets	0	51
Bowling average	–	36.11
5 wickets in innings	–	1
10 wickets in match	–	0
Best bowling	–	5/33
Catches/stumpings	14/–	76/–
- Source: CricketArchive, 7 January 2009

George Alphonso Headley OD, MBE (30 May 1909 – 30 November 1983) was a Jamaican cricketer who played 22 Test matches, mostly before World War II. Considered one of the best batsmen to play for the West Indies and one of the greatest cricketers of all time, Headley also represented Jamaica and played professional club cricket in England. West Indies had a weak cricket team through most of Headley's playing career; as their one world-class player, he carried a heavy responsibility and the side depended on his batting. He batted at number three, scoring 2,190 runs in Tests at an average of 60.83, and 9,921 runs in all first-class matches at an average of 69.86. He was chosen as one of the Wisden Cricketers of the Year in 1934.

Headley was born in Panama but raised in Jamaica, where he quickly established a cricketing reputation as a batsman. He soon gained his place in the Jamaican cricket team, and narrowly missed selection for the West Indies tour of England in 1928. He made his Test debut in 1930, against England in Barbados, and was instantly successful. Further successes followed in series against Australia and in three more against England, as Headley dominated the West Indian batting of the period. Following his tour of England in 1933, Headley signed as a professional at Haslingden in the Lancashire League, where he played until the outbreak of war in 1939.

The war interrupted Headley's career; although he returned to Tests in 1948, he was hampered by injuries and did not achieve his previous levels of success. Even so, he was chosen as West Indies captain in 1948 against England, the first black player to be appointed to the position, although a combination of injuries and politics meant he only led his team for one Test match. He did not play Tests between 1949 and 1953, but resumed his career in English league cricket, first in Lancashire and later in the Birmingham League. His playing career ended in 1954 on his return to Jamaica, after a public subscription paid his fare from England. After retiring as a player, Headley was employed as a cricket coach by the Jamaican government until 1962. He lived until 1983; his son Ron and his grandson Dean each played Test match cricket, for West Indies and England respectively.

== Early life ==
Headley was born in Colón, Panama, on 30 May 1909, the son of DeCourcy Headley and Irene Roberts. His father was from Barbados and his mother from Jamaica, but they had moved to Panama while DeCourcey worked on the construction of the Panama Canal. By the time Headley was five years old the Canal was complete, and the family moved to Cuba in search of further employment. In 1919, concerned by the amount of Spanish being spoken by her son, Headley's mother took him to Jamaica so he could be educated in an English-speaking school.

Headley moved in with his mother's sister-in-law Mrs Clarence Smith, in Rae Town, Kingston, and remained with her until her death in 1933. His mother returned to Cuba, but regularly exchanged letters with her son. He attended Calabar Elementary School, where he played for the school cricket team as a wicket-keeper, although a meagre sporting budget meant he had to do so without gloves. Later, he continued his education at Kingston High School. Taking part in all-day cricket matches at the local Crabhole Park, Headley began to attract local attention, and aged 16, he joined Raetown Cricket Club. In 1925 he scored his first century, batting at number three in the batting order in a match for Raetown against Clovelly.

On leaving school, Headley was appointed as a temporary clerk in a magistrate's court; this enabled him to play competitive cricket for the St Andrew's Police side in 1926, in a cup competition. Some impressive performances for the club earned him an invitation to practice with the Jamaica Colts team. However, his job made it impossible to attend, and he was not considered for the Jamaican side against Lord Tennyson's English touring side in 1927. That year, Headley began working for Keeling–Lindo Estates, in St Catherine. The firm were enthusiastic cricket patrons, allowing employees time off to play in matches, so that Headley was able to attend practice with the Jamaica team on a regular basis. He also moved to the St Catherine Cricket Club, captained by his immediate superior in Keeling–Lindo. To generate more income, Headley took a second job, working for the Jamaica Fruit and Shipping Company, but he wanted a secure profession. To this end, he planned to move to America to pursue a career in dentistry. However, he was now on the verge of the Jamaica team and a delay in the arrival of the application forms for his American work permit allowed him to make his first-class debut for Jamaica against another touring team led by Lord Tennyson.

== Early career ==
Headley made his Jamaica debut against Lord Tennyson's XI at Sabina Park on 9 February 1928, in a match won easily by the home team. Batting at number three, his first innings yielded 16 runs, but in the second innings, he scored 71, reaching fifty runs in as many minutes. In the second game against Lord Tennyson's XI which began in Kingston on 18 February, Headley scored his maiden first-class century. Having scored 22 not out after the first day's play, he reached 50 runs by playing very carefully but subsequently played more adventurous shots. He hit the bowling of Alan Hilder for four consecutive fours and twice hit Lord Tennyson for three fours in a row. At one point, thirteen of his scoring shots in a row went for four. He was finally out for 211, the highest score at the time by a West Indian batsman against an English team. After the innings, Tennyson compared Headley to Victor Trumper and Charlie Macartney, batsmen considered among the best who ever played. Headley concluded the series against Tennyson's team with innings of 40 and 71, to give him an aggregate of 409 runs at an average of 81.80. He also took his maiden first class wicket.

Following his success, Headley abandoned his prospective career in dentistry. Although some critics expected his selection for the West Indies tour of England in 1928, Headley was not chosen. While West Indies played their inaugural Test series during that tour, Headley continued to play for St Catherine's. He had another opportunity against English opposition in 1929, when a team led by Julien Cahn arrived to play two first-class games. Jamaica's distance from other Caribbean islands made it difficult for their cricketers to gain good-quality playing experience, so the frequent visits by English sides were important to the development of Jamaican cricket. These tours also served to build Headley's reputation. In the first match, Headley played a slow, defensive innings of 57, but he did not reach fifty in his other three innings. Even so, he was chosen by the Jamaican selectors for a West Indies XI, which included players from other islands, to play Cahn's team in their final tour match. The home side lost the toss and had to bat in very difficult conditions following rain. Headley found the fast bowlers difficult, but survived the period when the pitch was most difficult to bat on before he was out for 44. In the second innings, he attacked from the start and used a wide range of shots to reach 143 before he was run out. In three matches against the tourists, Headley scored 326 runs, averaging 54.33.

A change in the location of his job meant that Headley moved to the Lucas Cricket Club in 1929. He visited America and played some exhibition matches for the Jamaican Athletic Club in New York, scoring a century against a touring team from Bermuda; his parents had moved to America by then, which enabled Headley to combine the cricket with his first visit to his parents in ten years.

== Test match career ==
=== Debut and first Test series ===
In 1930, the Marylebone Cricket Club (MCC) undertook a tour of the West Indies which included four Test matches — the first Tests to be played in the West Indies. The MCC side was not at full international strength; it included players who were either just beginning or just ending their international careers, and several star English bowlers were missing. (Note: On most MCC tours of the lesser Test playing countries, leading players often chose not to tour, opting to rest at home. The side was usually competitive enough without them, and only on the more taxing tour of Australia was a fully representative team selected.) The first Test was played in Barbados and Headley was selected, making his debut for the West Indies on 11 February 1930—to the disapproval of some Barbadians who thought his place should have gone to a local player. Batting at number three, he played aggressively in the first innings but the crowd barracked him and he was bowled for 21. However, in the second innings he scored 176, becoming the first West Indian to score a century on his Test debut and only their second centurion overall. He shared century partnerships with both Clifford Roach and Frank de Caires, but these were insufficient to force victory, and the match was drawn. Headley remained in the Test side for the rest of the series, the only home player other than Roach to appear in all four Tests. In Trinidad, during the second Test, Headley found the unfamiliar conditions difficult—Trinidad was the only Test match ground in the Caribbean which was played on a pitch made from matting instead of grass. Headley scored eight and 39 as West Indies lost the match. The home side levelled the series with their first ever Test victory in the third match of the series, played in British Guiana. In this match Headley became the first West Indian, and only the fifth cricketer of any nation, to score two separate hundreds in a Test match. His first innings of 114 was played mainly in support of Roach, who scored a double century. In the second innings, Headley scored 112 as West Indies batted with a big first innings lead, attacking defensive English bowling.

While en route to the final Test in Jamaica, the West Indies team stopped in Panama and Costa Rica where official functions were held in Headley's honour. In Jamaica, where there was widespread jubilation, Headley attended several receptions and celebrations. When the cricket resumed, Headley scored 64, 72 and 55 in three innings against MCC for Jamaica. With the Test series level, it was agreed that the final match of the series would be played until one team won, regardless of how long it took—the other Tests had been limited to four days each. On the first three days, England scored 849. In reply West Indies could only manage 286, with Headley out for ten runs. England batted again, to set West Indies an eventual victory target of 836. This time, Headley batted for 390 minutes, faced 385 balls and hit 28 fours while scoring 223. He and Karl Nunes added 227 for the second wicket. Headley played the hook very effectively and hit many short deliveries for runs. When Headley was stumped, he had made what was at the time the fourth highest individual score in all Test cricket and the highest in a second innings. When West Indies still needed 428 runs, rain fell for two days and the match had to be abandoned after its ninth scheduled day. Headley ended the series with 703 runs at an average of 87.87.

=== Australian tour ===
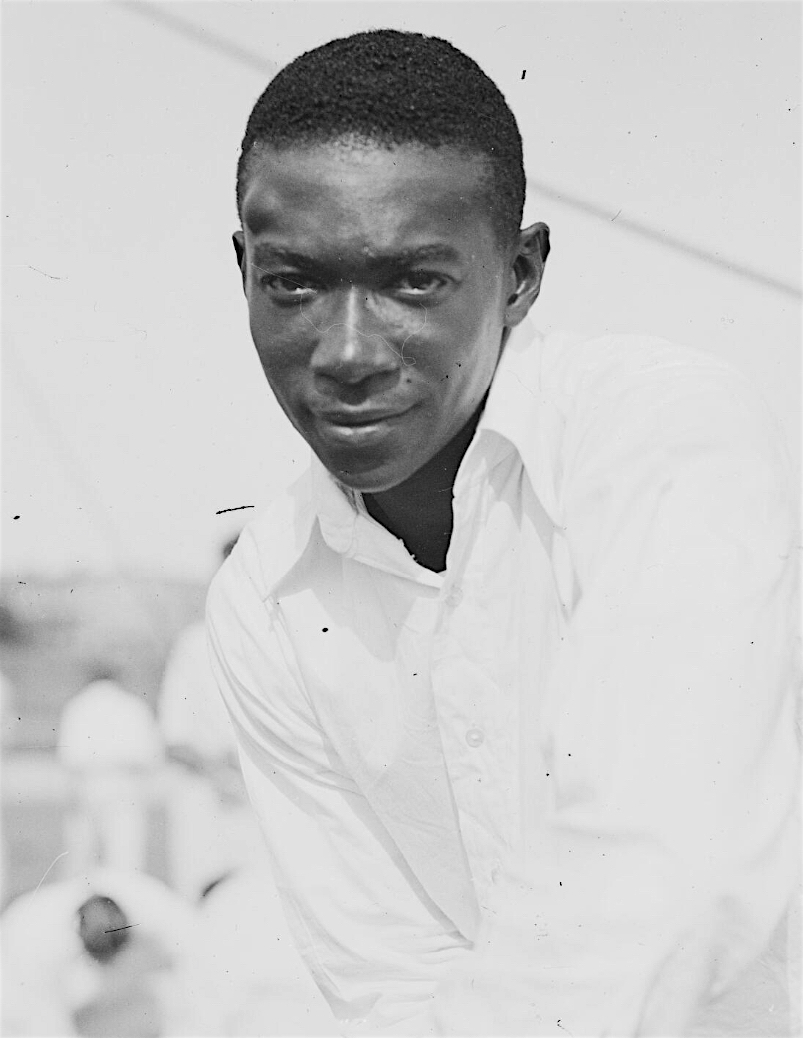
Headley on tour in Australia

Headley was selected for the West Indian tour of Australia in the 1930–31 season, under the captaincy of Jackie Grant. After a brief visit to New Zealand where they played a non-first-class match against Wellington, the tourists arrived in Sydney. Headley made a good start to the tour and attracted praise from the press in Australia and West Indies. The first match of the Australian leg was against New South Wales, where the West Indians were bowled out for 188 and Headley was stumped for 25. However, his runs came in less than two overs and Learie Constantine later rated this as one of Headley's best innings. (Note: In Australia at the time, overs consisted of eight balls rather than the six balls used in the West Indies and England.) In the second innings, Headley made 82, the top score, but could not prevent the tourists losing. The next match was also lost, as Bert Ironmonger took thirteen wickets in the match for Victoria. In the first innings, Headley scored 131 out of 212, regarded by one critic as one of the best centuries scored on the ground, and top-scored again with 34 in the second innings. By this stage the Australian bowlers had realised that Headley excelled when hitting the ball through the off side, and they began to alter their tactics accordingly. In the final match before the Test series began, against South Australia, Headley had problems playing the Australian bowlers, particularly the leg spin of Clarrie Grimmett. The Australians bowled at Headley's leg stump with fielders concentrated on the leg side, making it difficult for him to score runs. Headley scored 27 and 16 as his team were heavily defeated. These bowling tactics were used in subsequent matches, and Headley found difficulty in countering them.

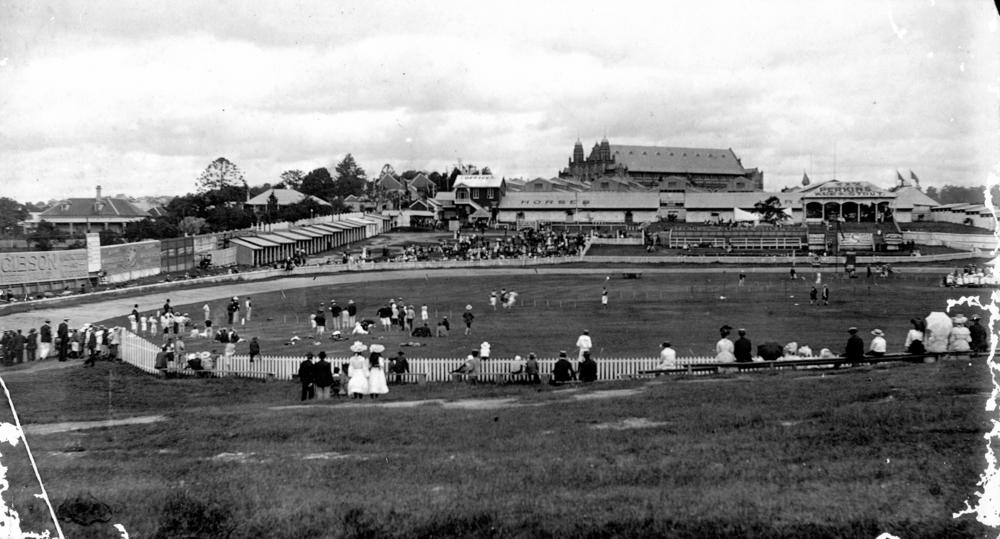
Brisbane's Exhibition Ground in 1906, where Headley scored West Indies' first century against Australia in 1931, after altering his batting style

At the beginning of the first Test, West Indies were bowled out 296 as Grimmett took seven wickets, including Headley first ball. In the second innings, with West Indies 80 behind, Grimmett again attacked Headley's leg stump. After having his scoring restricted, Headley lost patience and after scoring 11 was stumped, trying to hit Grimmett. Bowled out for 249, West Indies lost by ten wickets. After scoring only three in the following tour match against Tasmania, Headley contributed 14 and two in an innings defeat in the second Test. After two heavy Test defeats for the tourists, some critics believed that the series was too one-sided and that some of the five Tests should be cancelled. Headley's poor run of form continued in the West Indian victory over Queensland and, having put on weight, he was also struggling with his fitness. In an effort to overcome Australia's leg stump attack Headley had altered his batting stance; instead of standing at right angles to the bowler, he turned his body more front-on, to enable him to improve his placement of the ball on the leg side. His quick footwork enabled him to alter his position if necessary to play the ball on the off side. He also eliminated from his strokes a risky cover drive he had developed on Caribbean pitches. During the third Test at Brisbane, Headley made his first substantial contribution to the series, after Australia scored 558 batting first. Facing Grimmett's leg side tactics, Headley managed to score freely, and forced Grimmett to alter to an off stump attack. With ten fours in total, Headley became the first West Indian to score a century against Australia, and was left 102 not out when West Indies were bowled out for 193. Forced to follow-on, West Indies were dismissed for 148 of which Headley made 28, the highest score of the innings. Ironmonger tricked him into playing the leg glance and he was caught by the wicket-keeper who had moved across in anticipation of the shot.

Headley maintained his good form in matches against Victoria and South Australia after the third Test, scoring 77 and 113 in the first match and 75 and 39 in the second. Although neither match was won, the West Indians needed to take only one more wicket to win the first match when it ended drawn, and lost the second by a single wicket. However, the fourth Test was lost by an innings as Ironmonger again caused difficulties for the West Indies batsmen. Headley top-scored with 33 out of the first innings total of 99 but made only 11 on his second attempt, being dismissed both times by Ironmonger. By now the tour was making a financial loss, forcing the tourists to take economy measures such as travelling by tram. In conversation with a member of the Australian Board of Control, Headley, Constantine and fellow tourist Tommy Scott suggested the authorities should produce faster pitches to enable the public to see more attacking cricket. It seems this advice may have been heeded; the pitch was faster in a match against New South Wales, won by the West Indians, in which Headley scored 70 and two. In the fifth Test, West Indies won the toss and batted first, which proved an advantage in a match plagued by uncertain weather. Headley and fellow Jamaican Frank Martin scored centuries on the first day despite bowling from the Australians which the Jamaican newspaper Daily Gleaner described as good. Headley, playing Grimmett comfortably by now, batted for 146 minutes, and hit 13 fours. In the course of the innings he achieved the rare feat in Australia of reaching 1,000 first-class runs on the tour. Grant, the West Indies captain, declared the innings closed after rain had fallen to make the pitch more difficult for batting. Australia were then bowled out for 224, 126 runs behind West Indies. The tourists scored 124 more runs in their second innings, of which Headley made 30, before more rain fell and Grant declared for the second time in the match. Subsequently, the bowlers dismissed Australia for 220 to give West Indies their first win over Australia, although the series ended 4–1 to the home side. Headley scored 336 runs in the Test matches at an average of 37.33, and 1,066 runs at 44.41 in all first-class games.

On their return home, the West Indian players were well received by the public and officials; Headley received praise and once again attended functions arranged in his honour. In Australia Donald Bradman, the star Australian batsman, praised Headley, particularly for the way in which he had overcome his problems against Grimmett. C. L. R. James, the writer and historian, later wrote that Headley's success demonstrated his mastery of batting. Headley arrived in Australia as a primarily off-side player which accounted for his difficulty against the Australian bowlers' tactics. However, James notes: "What he did, under fire, so to speak, was to reorganise his batting to meet the new attack." So successful was Headley that he was described by Grimmett as the best on-side batsman against whom the bowler had played.

=== Tour by Lord Tennyson's team ===
Headley resumed playing for Lucas on his return to Jamaica, attracting great crowds and high expectations. Once the cricket season ended, he embarked on another trip to America to play exhibition matches, visiting his parents on the journey. On his return for the 1931–32 season, he was appointed captain of Lucas and began preparing for the forthcoming tour of Jamaica by another team led by Lord Tennyson. In addition to his regular practice, Headley began a programme of running and swimming to improve his overall fitness. After performing well in the trial matches for Jamaica, he was selected in the first match against the tourists. Jamaica made an uncertain start, losing five wickets by the time their score reached 215 but Headley had scored 130. He then shared a partnership of 487 for the sixth wicket with Clarence Passailaigue; 236 not out after the first day's play, Headley went on to score an unbeaten 344, after batting for 407 minutes and hitting 39 fours. Jamaica totalled 702, and won the match by an innings. During his innings, Headley passed the previous highest score by any West Indian batsman, 304 not out by Percy Tarilton in 1920, and the highest score in the West Indies by any batsman, Andy Sandham's 325 in 1930. His partnership with Passailaigue took 248 minutes, and as of 2015 remains a world record for the highest sixth wicket partnership in a first-class match. The success of two home batsmen led to celebrations in Jamaica and praise from the English bowlers for Headley's batting. Headley continued his success in the second game, opening the batting and top-scoring with 84 in the first innings. In the second innings, opening again, he made 155 not out to guide West Indies to their victory target of 363. In the final match, Headley scored his third century of the series after returning to number three, accumulating 140 of Jamaica's total of 561. Jamaica won the match to win the series 3–0; Headley scored 723 runs at an average of 361.50. In the remainder of the season, Headley led Lucas to victory in the Senior Cup, scoring a century in the final.

=== 1933 tour of England ===
After playing in two trial matches, Headley was selected to tour England in 1933 under the continuing captaincy of Jackie Grant. The English press speculated on Headley's ability to cope with English conditions, while expecting him to perform to a high standard. In the event, Wisden believed he justified the expectations and increased his reputation. In the first match of the tour he scored 52 out of a total of 129 against Northamptonshire, in difficult batting conditions on a wet pitch. He scored fifties in each of his next three matches before scoring a century against the MCC during his first appearance at Lord's Cricket Ground. In the second innings of this match, a short ball from Bill Bowes struck Headley on the chest, and as a result of this injury he missed three games, but when he returned to the team he scored 129 against Glamorgan and 224 not out against Somerset. A quieter match followed against Middlesex, but Headley reached his second double century of the tour in the match against Derbyshire, which took him past 1,000 runs for the season. Despite Headley's contributions, the West Indians won only one of these matches and subsequently lost the first Test against England by an innings. Headley scored 13 in the West Indies first innings, and his 50 was the highest score when West Indies followed-on. Critics were impressed by Headley's second innings performance, in which he scored his runs out of 64 added while he was batting. Between the first and second Tests, in matches where conditions were difficult for batting and ideal for spin bowlers, Headley scored three fifties and achieved his side's highest score in each of four innings.

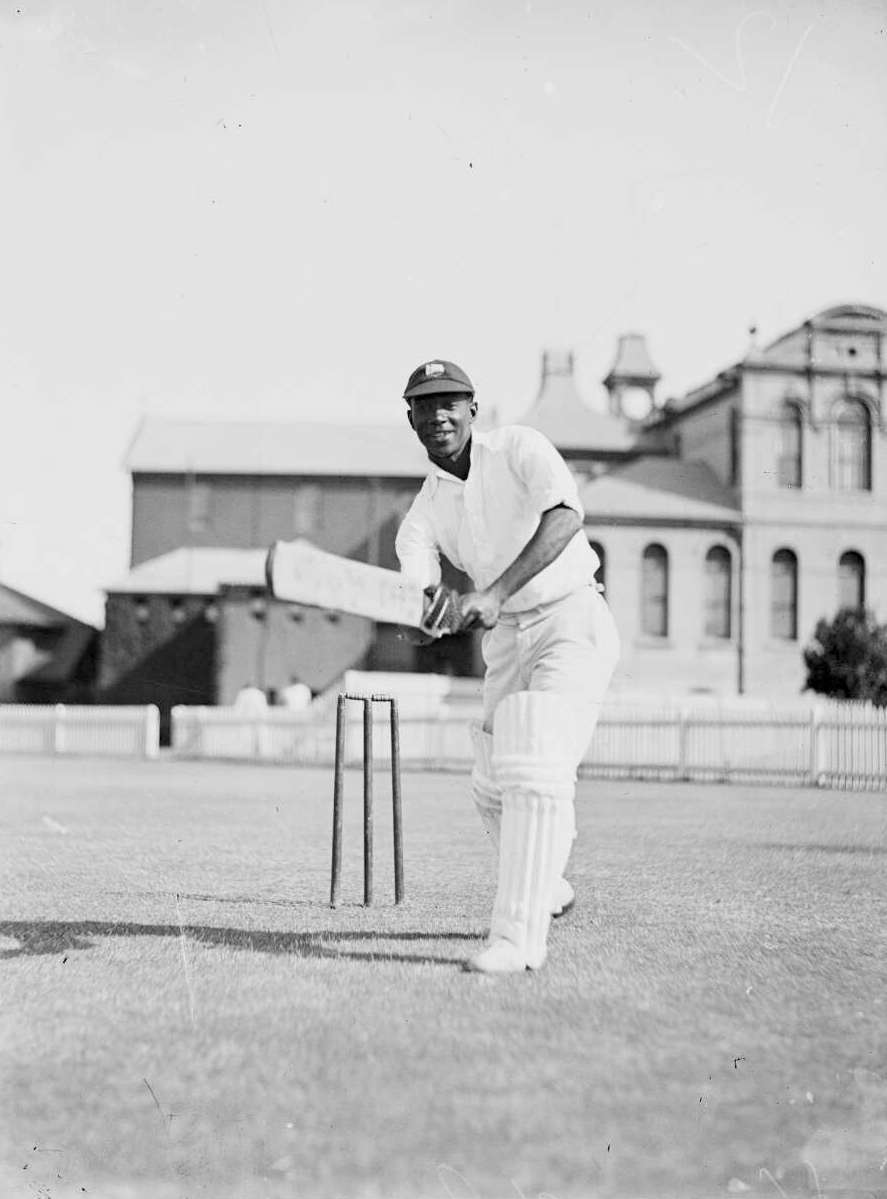
Headley demonstrating his batting technique

West Indies drew the second Test, avoiding defeat for the first time in a Test in England. Headley scored 169 in 375 minutes with 18 fours, sharing a partnership of 200 in 205 minutes with Ivan Barrow—who became the first West Indian to score a Test century in England, minutes before Headley became the second. When the innings ended, Headley was still not out and the crowd gave him an excellent reception. Wisden described Headley's batting as magnificent, displaying "a ready adaptability and perfection of timing." The West Indies bowlers used Bodyline tactics in the England innings; England's Nobby Clark used the tactic in the West Indian second innings, in which Headley scored 24 runs. He was one of the few of his side's batsmen able to resist the bowling tactics.

After scoring an unbeaten 257 in a minor match against Norfolk, Headley scored 89 in his team's victory over Glamorgan and 182 against Warwickshire. However, he failed in the third and final Test, scoring nine and 12 as West Indies were defeated by an innings. The tourists thus lost the series 2–0; in the three Tests Headley's aggregate was 277 runs at an average of 55.40, the best figures for the team. After the Test matches were over, Headley had an operation to remove a sebaceous cyst from his forehead and missed several games, before returning for an end-of-season festival match in which he scored 167 against an England XI. When the tour concluded, Headley had scored 2,320 runs with seven hundreds, at an average of 66.28. This was over 1,000 runs more than any other tourist and placed him third in the English first-class batting averages for the season. Ivan Barrow believed Headley reached his batting peak during the tour. He recalled how many bowlers tried to hit his pads with the ball but Headley simply flicked the ball away. Headley's performances earned him selection as one of Wisden's Cricketers of the Year. The accompanying article called his tour "almost a triumphant march" and described him as "the best batsman the West Indies have ever produced." Wisden editor Sydney Southerton also described him as a giant in the team and wrote: "From what we had been told by English players who had been to the West Indies, we were fully prepared for Headley's success, but even so, he astonished most of us." Headley bowled more than he had previously: prior to the tour, he had taken three first class wickets, but took 21 wickets in England at an average of 34.33, bowling off spin.

During the tour, Headley received news that his aunt had been killed by floods in Kingston which had also destroyed his home. Headley was greatly affected by the news, particularly the nature of her death. Although not able to attend the funeral, he wanted to leave England on an earlier ship than the rest of the team, but this could not be arranged in time.

=== Lancashire League ===
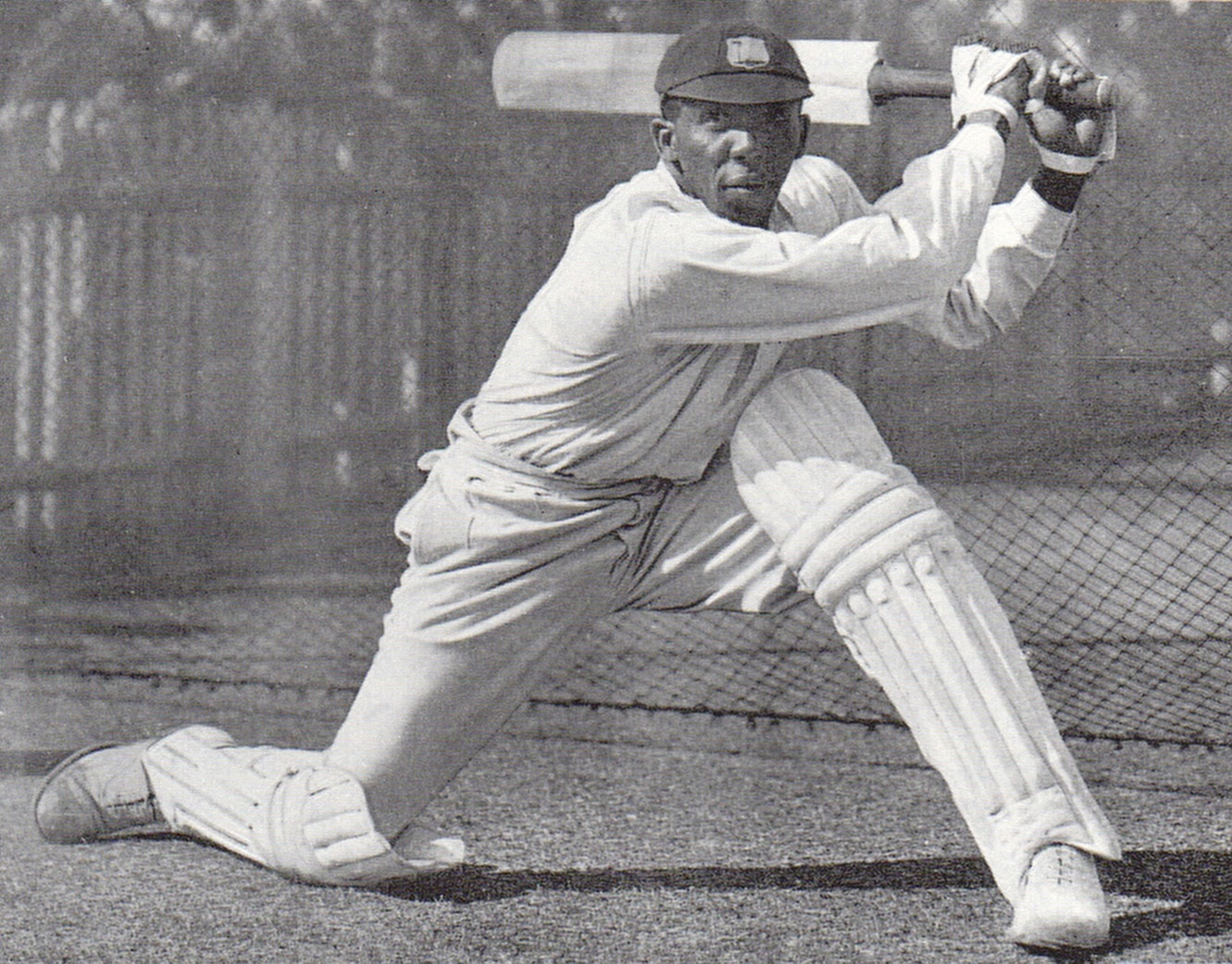
Learie Constantine, Headley's teammate for West Indies and rival in the Lancashire League

Following his success in England in 1933, Headley was offered a two-year contract to play professional cricket for Haslingden in the Lancashire League for £500 per season, the highest of several offers. The money was far more than he was earning from working as a fruit picker in Jamaica, and after consulting the Jamaican Cricket Board, who advised him to accept, he signed with the club on 8 September 1933. There was a special provision which allowed Headley to be released to play for West Indies. Living in Haslingden where there were few, if any, other black people, Headley faced some prejudice from residents. However, he was generally welcomed and accepted. His first season was in 1934 and his first match was against Nelson, for whom Headley's West Indian Test colleague Learie Constantine played. Headley had a difficult match. As the professional, he was expected to open the bowling although, as a spinner, he would normally have bowled later in an innings. When he batted he was run out for a duck by Constantine after facing one delivery, and Haslingden lost the match. After this poor start, Headley scored 1,063 runs in the season at an average of 50.62, with three centuries. He changed his bowling style to medium pace and took 59 wickets at an average of 16.59. In 1935 he scored over 900 runs at an average of 61.13, and took 34 wickets; his contract was renewed for another two years. In 1936 he again scored over 900 runs, and took 54 wickets. In 1937 he broke the record for most runs scored by any player in a Lancashire League season, accumulating 1,360 at an average of 97.15, with five centuries; he also took 41 wickets. Headley's final two-year contract with the club covered the seasons 1938 and 1940, since he was expected to tour England with the West Indies team in 1939. The war prevented him playing in 1940, so his last season with Haslingden was 1938. Although in that year his overall batting performance declined, to 677 runs at an average of 37.61, he took 76 wickets at 9.70 and had success in the Worsley Cup competition, including one innings of 189 not out in a match played over five evenings.

=== Career in mid-1930s ===
Headley did not play any first-class cricket in the West Indies in 1933–34, but returned to Jamaica in readiness for the 1934–35 MCC tour. The visiting team, under the captaincy of Bob Wyatt, was stronger than English teams that had previously toured the Caribbean; despite some shortcomings, Wisden and other critics considered it strong enough for the task in hand.

The first Test in Barbados was badly affected by rain which made the pitch almost impossible to bat on. West Indies batted first and were bowled out for 102; Headley's 44 was the highest score of the match. In reply, England had scored 81 for seven when Wyatt declared in an attempt to make West Indies bat while the pitch was difficult. In the second innings, Headley was out for a duck and Jackie Grant declared when West Indies had scored 51 for six, so that England required 73 to win; they did so after losing six wickets. In the second Test, Headley scored 25 in his first innings; in the second, he adopted a cautious approach as his team led by 44, hitting 93 in 225 minutes. West Indies subsequently bowled out England to win the match and level the series. The rain-affected third Test was drawn, with Headley's 53 his side's top score.

The MCC went to Jamaica for the final leg of their tour. Headley played two matches for Jamaica against the tourists; he failed in the first game but scored 127 in the second. The teams went into the fourth and final Test with the series still level at one win apiece. West Indies batted first, facing accurate bowling. The local press criticised the West Indies batsmen for slow batting on the first day, but Headley scored 132. The Daily Gleaner noted that Headley maintained the controlled approach he had established in the season. On the second day, he took his score to 270 not out, and the Gleaner described him as "the genius we all know, scoring with all his old freedom and audacity." In total, he batted for 495 minutes and hit 30 fours, recording the highest score by a West Indian batsman. It remained a West Indian record until Garfield Sobers scored 365 not out in 1958, and was the team's highest against England until Lawrence Rowe scored 302 in 1974. West Indies scored 535 for seven and bowled out England twice to record their first victory in a Test series. Headley contributed 485 runs at an average of 97.00.

Headley returned to England to play for Haslingden in the 1935 English season, and played a single first-class game, scoring a century for Sir L Parkinson's XI against Leicestershire. In the 1935–36 season, the Yorkshire team toured Jamaica, playing three first-class matches, winning one and drawing the others. The touring county considered Headley the key batsman, and targeted him by bowling defensively in an attempt to frustrate him. Headley lost his wicket through impatience in the first match, although he scored a pair of fifties, but scored a century in the third game. In total, he scored 266 runs at an average of 53.20, but Yorkshire won the series after winning the first game, Jamaica's first defeat at home in a first-class game for ten years. The matches were played in a very competitive atmosphere, but scoring was slow and Yorkshire played attritional cricket. During the series, Headley demanded expenses, which were not normally granted to the players. The Jamaican Board were reluctant to pay but Headley pointed out that, as a professional cricketer, he was entitled to the same treatment as the Yorkshire players, whose expenses were provided. The Board eventually relented before the series ended.

=== Second tour of England ===
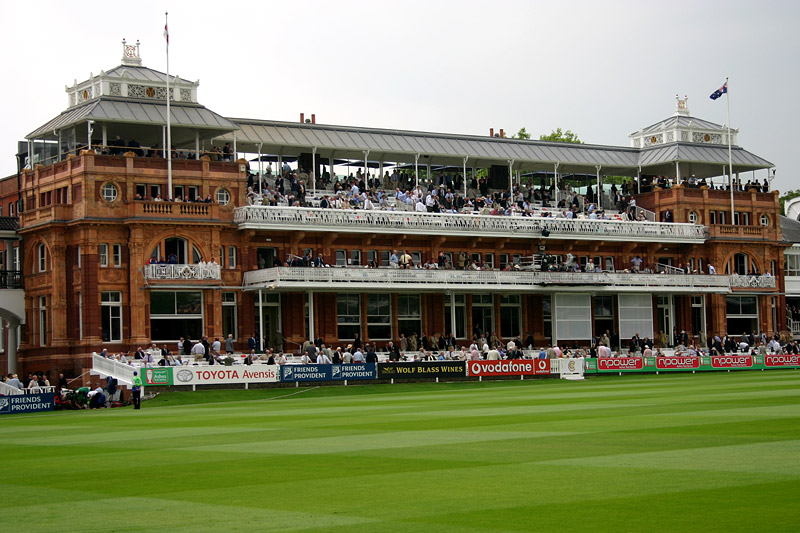
The pavilion at Lord's Cricket Ground, the ground where Headley scored two Test centuries in 1939

In 1936 Headley returned to England, and played no more first-class cricket until the two trial matches for the 1939 tour of England. These matches were played in Trinidad where it was believed the matting pitches would most closely replicate English conditions; Jamaica played Trinidad and a combination team. When Jamaica's captain, Crab Nethersole, withdrew from the tour due to political commitments, Headley led Jamaica in both matches and scored 160 and 103. Subsequently, he was chosen for his second tour of England, under the captaincy of Rolph Grant. Headley opened his tour with fifties in his first two matches and by the time the Test series started, although the tourists had lost three matches, he had scored three centuries—103 against Cambridge University, 116 not out in a victory over Essex and 227 as the tourists defeated Middlesex.

In the first Test, West Indies suffered their only defeat of the series. However, Norman Preston, the editor of Wisden, wrote: "the match provided a personal triumph for Headley", as he became only the second cricketer after Herbert Sutcliffe to make two hundreds in the same Test match on two separate occasions, having previously done so against England in 1930. He became the first player to score two hundreds in a Lord's Test, a feat not repeated until 1990. In the first innings, Headley scored 106 with 13 fours. After sharing a big partnership with Jeff Stollmeyer, he received little help from the other batsmen. He played cautiously during his 250-minute innings, as he was aware that his team were relying on his success. By the time West Indies batted again, England had established a lead of 127. Headley again batted defensively to score 107, taking two hours to reach 50, as West Indies needed to bat for a long time to secure a draw. However, he scored runs from any loose bowling and batted in all for 230 minutes, hitting eight fours. Preston, writing in Wisden, believed the West Indians relied too much on Headley's batting. He also noted that Headley had to play cautiously for his team and although he hit powerful shots, "he was not the same dashing batsmen that England knew in 1933." Headley had scored three centuries in consecutive Test innings, but he could not prevent England winning this first Test by eight wickets. He continued to score heavily in the tour matches, making an unbeaten 234 in an innings win over Nottinghamshire, followed by 61 against Yorkshire on a sticky wicket, one of the best innings Neville Cardus had seen.

The second Test was drawn, after being badly affected by rain. Headley, although troubled by the English bowling on a difficult pitch, top-scored with 51 in West Indies' first innings but the other batsmen contributed little. Headley scored just five in West Indies' brief second innings, bringing to an end a sequence of six fifties in successive Test innings. After the Test, Headley scored 93 against Surrey but failed to reach fifty in his next three games, which included three single figure scores. West Indies needed to win the final Test to level the series and the team established a first-innings lead of 146. Headley played cautiously for 140 minutes, attempting to tire out the bowlers, but was run out for 65 in a misunderstanding with Vic Stollmeyer. The remaining batsmen played well, attacking the English bowling. Preston believed this match demonstrated West Indies' ability to compete at the highest level. However, England were able to bat long enough to secure a draw. In the Test series, Headley scored 334 runs at an average of 66.80, but did not play again on the tour after the final Test, as the team were advised to abandon the last seven matches because of the deteriorating political situation in Europe. They arrived in Canada on the day that Britain declared war on Germany. In all first-class matches during the tour, Headley scored 1,745 runs at 72.70, placing him at the top of the season's first-class averages.

Wisden judged Headley to be the best batsman of the 1939 season, while other critics rated him among the best batsmen in the world, with favourable comparisons to Bradman. C. B. Fry, a former England captain turned journalist, wrote that Headley's "middle name should be Atlas", suggesting that he carried the team on his shoulders.

== Later career ==
=== After the war ===
Following the outbreak of war, the Lancashire League clubs cancelled professionals' contracts, meaning Headley did not complete his final year with Haslingden. Having returned to Jamaica, he worked in the Labour Department for the government and played cricket for Lucas, enjoying batting success and captaining his team to victory in the Senior Cup on three occasions. Headley continued to play for the team until 1947, when he left to play for the Kensington Club. Unlike other Caribbean teams, Jamaica did not take part in inter-island competition, and although Headley played some exhibition matches in America in 1945, it was not until June 1946 that he took part in his next first-class match. Trinidad played three matches in Jamaica and Headley scored 52 in the second game but only reached his best form when he scored 99 in the third. However, he was successful as a bowler, taking five for 33 in the first game, the only five wicket return of his career. This included a spell of three wickets without conceding a run in 14 deliveries, prompting a pitch invasion by the crowd. Headley also captained Jamaica in the final two matches of the series against Trinidad after the official captain was injured during the home team's win in the first match—the other two were drawn.

Prior to a visit by Barbados in March 1947, Headley was officially appointed as Jamaican captain. Previous captains of island teams had been almost exclusively white. Around this time, Headley requested the Jamaican board provide support for low income players with their kit and transport costs. In the first game against Barbados, Headley scored 203 not out and 57 not out, took four for 40 in the tourists' first innings and another wicket in the second. Although the game was drawn, he had recorded Jamaica's highest score in a match between the Caribbean islands. The second match was also drawn; Headley made 79 before he had to retire when he fell and injured his knee. Another American tour followed, in which Headley was accompanied by promising young players, before he led the Jamaican team to British Guiana in October 1947. He played only two innings in the two matches, scoring 36 and 4 not out. A thumb injury in the first match meant he could not bat, although he bowled 44 overs in the game. Headley was verbally abused by a section of the crowd, who disapproved of a black captain; he was also dissatisfied with the impartiality of the umpires. Crab Nethersole, the Jamaican manager for the tour, reported that injuries to key players and the poor attitude of the crowd made the tour difficult, although Headley's captaincy was universally praised.

=== Resumption of Test career ===
For reasons related to class and race, it had been unthinkable before the war for the West Indies to appoint a black Test captain, but the postwar world saw social and political changes in the Caribbean. Although opinion was still divided over the merits of a black captain, Headley was appointed as one of the West Indian captains for the series against the England team which toured the Caribbean in 1948. Crab Nethersole, the former Jamaican captain and member of the Board of Control for cricket, argued Headley should be outright captain but a compromise was reached. Headley was scheduled to captain the first and fourth Test matches, played in Barbados and Jamaica, and the white players Gerry Gomez and John Goddard were given the captaincy of the second and third matches. In the event, Headley only played in the first Test. In the first innings, he scored 29 but strained his back while fielding. Batting towards the end of West Indies' second innings, he scored seven not out. Rain helped England to draw the match. Headley's back caused him to miss the second and third Tests, but he was fit enough to play for Jamaica when the tourists arrived there to play two games against the island before the fourth and final Test. After the first island game, in which he scored 65, Headley's request to miss the second match to rest his back was refused by the Jamaican Board. He scored 36 not out, but aggravated his back pains and he withdrew from the final Test. West Indies won this game under the captaincy of Goddard, who had earlier led West Indies to victory in the third Test. He was subsequently chosen to captain West Indies in India in 1948–49, despite Headley's availability and apparently superior claims to the position.

Selected for the Indian tour after a specific request by the Indian cricket authorities, Headley did not have much success in the early matches and in the drawn first Test he scored only two in a total of 631. West Indies then moved to Pakistan; in a non-first-class game Headley took six wickets as a bowler, but then in a match against a representative Pakistan XI he fell and injured his side while attempting to take a catch. He batted in discomfort, scoring 57 not out. This injury meant that he played no further part in the five-match Test series against India. Although he continued to travel with the team, he was unable to play in any further matches until the final game of the tour, when he scored 100 against Ceylon Schools as the tourists travelled home via Ceylon.

Headley played for the Kensington Club until 1950, when he resumed league cricket in England; he returned for a final season with Kensington in 1955 before retiring from Senior Cup cricket. Meanwhile, he took a new job as an insurance agent. This affected his availability for cricket as he was no longer able to take leave when playing for a team; if he did not work, he received no wages. Consequently, he did not accept the captaincy of Jamaica during the Test trials for the 1950 tour of England and did not travel with the team. Press reaction was unfavourable towards Headley but the West Indies Board still wanted to select him for the tour. However, Headley accepted a contract with Bacup in the Lancashire League, to replace Everton Weekes who was in the touring party.

For Bacup Headley scored 909 runs and took 20 wickets in 1950, before signing to play for Dudley in the Birmingham League in 1951. He and his family moved to Birmingham, and in each the next four seasons Headley averaged over 65 with the bat and under 17 with the ball. In his second season, the club topped the league. In total, he scored 2,878 runs for Dudley and, resuming off spin bowling, took 102 wickets. While in England during this time, he played several first-class matches for a Commonwealth XI against an England XI; he scored 20 in 1951 and accumulated 98 and 61 in 1952.

=== End of Test career ===
Headley's success for Dudley was watched keenly in Jamaica and commentators began to discuss his availability for the 1954 series against England. A public subscription to finance his travel to Jamaica, opened by the Daily Gleaner, raised over £1,000, and despite his reservations, Headley returned to Jamaica. Playing in a fund-raising match, he sustained a hand injury and playing for the Combined Parishes in a minor match against the MCC, a short ball from Fred Trueman struck Headley's arm. The latter injury kept him out of the first-class match between Jamaica and the MCC, but he played in the second where, although hampered by his injury, he scored 53 not out. The Test selectors had seen enough to include Headley in the team for the first Test. Reaction among critics was mixed, and Headley, nearing his 45th birthday, remains the oldest man as of 2015 to play a Test match for West Indies. Headley batted at number six, and it appeared that England, under the captaincy of Len Hutton, let Headley score an easy run to begin his innings, (Note: Such gestures towards senior figures in cricket were usually intended as a mark of respect.) which Hutton later confirmed to be the case. However, Headley later argued that the run was given to ensure that he was batting at the beginning of the next over, so that England could try to get him out before he settled down.

Headley scored 16 and 1 in the match, his final Test appearance. He used his experience to influence the captain, Jeff Stollmeyer, advising him not to enforce the follow on and to use leg theory bowling to slow down the tourists' scoring. These tactics helped West Indies to a 140-run win in a match they might have lost; Stollmeyer followed a similar approach in the following match. In 22 Tests, Headley scored 2,190 runs at an average of 60.83.

Headley finished his career at Dudley at the end of 1954; his son Ron played for the club from 1957, having already played for its second team in 1952 as a 13-year-old. After his final Test match appearance, Headley's only other first-class match was in the Commonwealth XI fixture in 1954, when he scored 64 in his final first-class innings. In a career total of 103 first-class games he aggregated 9,921 runs at 69.86, with 33 centuries, and took 51 wickets at 36.11.

== Style, technique and legacy ==
Headley is regarded by critics as one of the best batsmen from the Caribbean and one of the greatest batsmen of all time. In his history of West Indies cricket, Michael Manley described Headley as "the yardstick against whom all other West Indian batsmen are measured". In 1988, The Cricketer magazine placed him in an all-time West Indian team, as did a panel of judges for another such team in July 2010, while in 2004, another panel of experts named him among the top five West Indian players. He was given the nicknames "the Black Bradman" and "Atlas" by commentators, and was the first world-class batsman from the West Indies who was black. Bradman remarked in 1988 "I'm proud to think that they dubbed him the 'Black Bradman' - perhaps it should have been in reverse."

According to historian Gideon Haigh, Headley's role was made harder by the weakness of his colleagues, as few outstanding players find it easy to play in teams which lose frequently. Although he was a naturally attacking player, Headley felt the need to play cautiously owing to the way his team depended on him. C. L. R. James believed that no other great batsman had to carry such a burden for so long. In the years before the war, Headley scored 25.61% of the runs scored in Tests by West Indies, more than twice as many as the next best batsman, and two-thirds of the team's centuries, scoring ten of the team's first fourteen centuries in Test cricket. Headley usually batted at number three and as the opening batsmen were often dismissed quickly, he frequently began his innings early.

As of 2023, Headley's average in Test matches of 60.83 is third highest among those with 2,000 runs, behind Bradman and Graeme Pollock. In all first-class matches, he has the third highest average with 69.86, behind Bradman and Vijay Merchant among those who played 50 innings. He averaged a century every fourth innings in which he batted, second again to Bradman, and did not suffer a poor series in his career before the war.

Manley describes Headley as just under medium height with sloping shoulders. His movements were precise and economical on the cricket field; his cap was usually at a slight angle and his sleeves were buttoned down to the wrist. Wisden noted in 1933 that his timing and placement of the ball was perfect. Exceptionally quick on his feet, he watched the ball onto the bat more than any other batsman. According to Wisden, all his shots were equally good but most notable was his on drive played from the back foot. He hit the ball hard and was very difficult to get out. He faced criticism for playing off the back foot so often, but R. C. Robertson-Glasgow believed his square cut, late cut, and hook were exceptionally good. Headley was particularly effective on bad batting wickets. C. L. R. James calculated that Headley averaged 39.85 and passed fifty on seven occasions in thirteen innings on difficult wickets. According to James's reckoning, Bradman in similar conditions passed fifty once, and averaged 16.66 in fifteen innings. Headley himself preferred batting when the odds favoured the bowlers as he had to go for his shots and play his natural attacking game. He stated: "On a bad wicket, it was you and the bowler ...no nonsense."

Beyond cricket, Headley's success was regarded as important. Of Headley's meeting with King George VI in 1939, the West Indian writer Frank Birbalsingh said: "That one of us—a black man — could shake the hand of a king introduced possibilities formerly undreamt of in our colonial backwater of racial inferiority, psychological subordination and political powerlessness." Manley notes that Headley rose to success at a time of political awakening in Jamaica, when the black majority of the population were increasingly determined to end the minority rule of landowners and challenge the racism of the time. According to Manley, the middle classes saw in Headley "the reassurance which they needed. He demonstrated black capacity." The white upper classes were proud of his achievements as a West Indian, but Manley writes "it was to the black masses that Headley had the deepest significance ... [He] became the focus for longing of an entire people for proof: proof of their own self-worth, their own capacity. Furthermore, they wanted this proof to be laid at the door of the white man who owned the world which defined their circumstances." Manley sees the title of "Atlas" not just in sporting terms, but in his carrying "the hopes of the black, English-speaking Caribbean man ... He was black excellence personified in a white world and in a white sport."

== Personal life ==
=== Coaching career ===
Following the 1955 cricket season, Headley was invited to become a national coach, a post created by the Jamaican government, which involved working mainly with young people. Headley and his second son travelled back to Jamaica, while the rest of the family remained in England. Headley had a heavy workload, particularly in rural areas; together with his assistant Dickie Fuller his role involved encouraging school children to watch and play cricket, and trying to improve standards and facilities throughout the country. Headley became involved in the selection of teams, taking some of them overseas. At this time, he discovered the future West Indian Test player Roy Gilchrist and future Jamaican cricketer Henry Sewell. However, critics in the 1960s complained that there were not enough Jamaicans in the Test side and blamed Headley and Fuller, although the government remained supportive of their performance. In 1961, Headley coached for six months in Nigeria and earned praise from the Nigerian Cricket Association. His official coaching role in Jamaica ended after a new government withdrew funding for coaching in 1962.

=== Family and retirement ===
Headley married Rena Saunders in 1939. He had nine children in total, including Ron Headley who was born two days after the end of the Lord's Test of 1939. Ron Headley went on to play professional cricket for the English counties Worcestershire and Derbyshire, and represented Jamaica before playing two Tests for West Indies in 1973. Another son, Lynn, reached the semi-finals of the 100 metres and came fourth in the 100 metres relay at the 1964 Olympics; he also won a gold medal with Jamaican sprint relay teams in the Central American and Caribbean Games of 1966 and silver with the relay team at the Commonwealth Games of the same year. Ron's son Dean, Headley's grandson, played Test cricket for England; the family thus became the first to have three generations play Test cricket.

After his retirement from coaching, Headley remained associated with cricket, presenting awards and playing in friendly matches. He was the official representative of the Jamaican Cricket Board at Learie Constantine's funeral in 1971. Official recognition came Headley's way when he was awarded the M.B.E. in 1956 and was made an honorary life member of the MCC in 1958. In 1969, a bronze sculpture of his head was unveiled in Jamaica's National Stadium, and in 1973, the Norman Manley Foundation gave him the Award for Excellence in Sports. In the latter year, he also received the Order of Distinction. He died in Kingston on 30 November 1983.

== See also ==
- List of Test cricketers born in non-Test playing nations

== Bibliography ==
- James, C. L. R. (1983) [1963]. Beyond a Boundary. London: Serpent's Tail. ISBN 1-85242-358-7.
- Hill, Alan (2000). Hedley Verity. Portrait of a Cricketer. Edinburgh and London: Mainstream Publishing. ISBN 1-84018-302-0.
- Lawrence, Bridgette (1995). Masterclass. The Biography of George Headley. Leicester: Polar Publishing (UK) Ltd. ISBN 1-899538-05-4.
- Manley, Michael (1995) [1988]. A History of West Indies Cricket. London: Andre Deutsch. ISBN 0-233-98937-4.
