= Lionel Birkett =

West Indian cricketer (1905–1998)

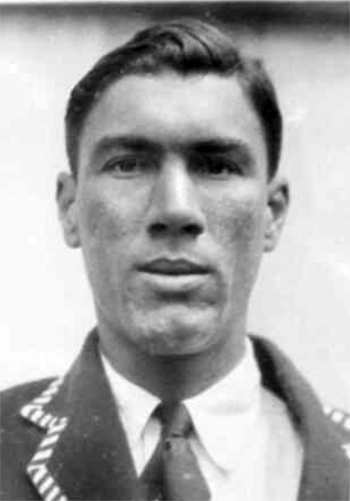
- Lionel Birkett in 1930

Personal information
- Full name: Lionel Sydney Birkett
- Born: April 14, 1905; Saint Michael, Barbados
- Died: January 16, 1998 (aged 92); Saint James, Barbados
- Batting: Right-handed
- Bowling: Right-arm medium

International information
- National side: West Indies
- Test debut (cap 30): 12 December 1930 v Australia
- Last Test: 13 February 1931 v Australia

Career statistics
Competition	Tests	First-class
Matches	4	26
Runs scored	136	1295
Batting average	17.00	33.20
100s/50s	0/1	3/3
Top score	64	253
Balls bowled	126	1139
Wickets	1	9
Bowling average	71.00	56.00
5 wickets in innings	0	0
10 wickets in match	0	0
Best bowling	1/16	2/6
Catches/stumpings	4/–	22/–
- Source: Cricinfo, 19 July 2021

Lionel Sydney Birkett (April 14, 1905, Saint Michael, Barbados – January 16, 1998, Saint James, Barbados) was a West Indian cricketer who played in 4 Tests from 1930 to 1931.

Preceded by Jack Newman	Oldest Living Test Cricketer; 23 September 1996 – 16 January 1998	Succeeded by Alf Gover
