= Thomas Oates (cricketer) =

English cricketer

Thomas William Oates (9 August 1875 – 18 June 1949), named Tom Oates in some contexts, was a first-class cricketer and Test match umpire.

Born in Eastwood, Nottinghamshire, in 1875, Oates played 434 matches for London County and Nottinghamshire as a wicket keeper and right-handed batsman between 1897 and 1925. He took 758 catches and completed 235 stumpings and scored 5976 runs with a best of 88. He then turned to umpiring, standing in 5 Tests between his first, the England v West Indies match at the Oval in 1928 and his last, the Ashes match at Headingley in 1930. He died in Eastwood in 1949.

He held the Nottinghamshire record for dismissals (967: 744 catches and 223 stumpings) until it was broken by Chris Read in 2017.
