= Walter French (cricket umpire) =

Australian cricket umpire (died 1961)

Walter G. French (died 1961) was a cricket Test match umpire.

He umpired two Test matches in 1931 between Australia and the West Indies. He made his debut in the second Test match played at Sydney on 1 January to 5 January 1931, won by Australia by an innings with Bill Ponsford scoring 183. In this match, French was partnered by another debutant umpire, George Borwick, who went on to umpire 24 Test matches. In his other match, the fifth of that series, in which the West Indies gained their first win over Australia, he was partnered by Henry Armstrong, standing in his only Test match.

== See also ==
- List of Test cricket umpires
