= Percy Hornibrook =

Australian cricketer

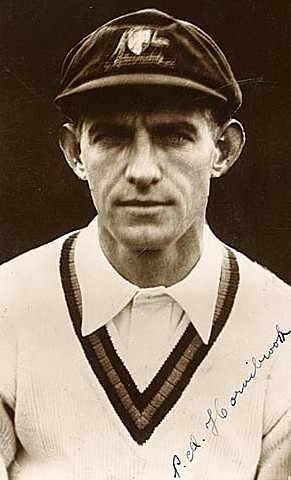
- Hornibrook in 1930

Personal information
- Born: 27 July 1899; Obi Obi, Queensland, Australia
- Died: 25 August 1976 (aged 77); Spring Hill, Brisbane, Queensland
- Height: 6 ft 3 in (1.91 m)
- Batting: Left-handed
- Bowling: Left-arm slow-medium

International information
- National side: Australia
- Test debut (cap 132): 8 March 1929 v England
- Last Test: 16 August 1930 v England

Domestic team information
- Years: Team
- 1919/20–1933/34: Queensland

Career statistics
Competition	Test	First-class
Matches	6	71
Runs scored	60	754
Batting average	10.00	10.77
100s/50s	0/0	0/1
Top score	26	59*
Balls bowled	1,579	15,721
Wickets	17	279
Bowling average	39.05	23.83
5 wickets in innings	1	17
10 wickets in match	0	6
Best bowling	7/92	8/60
Catches/stumpings	7/–	66/–
- Source: Cricinfo, 10 September 2022

Percival Mitchell Hornibrook (27 July 1899 – 25 August 1976) was an Australian cricketer who played in six Test matches from 1929 to 1930. He played first-class cricket for Queensland from 1919–20 to 1933–34.

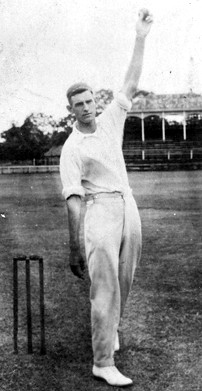
Hornibrook's delivery

== Early life ==
Hornibrook was born in the rural settlement of Obi Obi, Queensland, and moved to Brisbane with his parents when he was 12. After leaving school he worked as a dental assistant before studying dentistry. He qualified as a dentist in 1928.

== Cricket career ==
Hornibrook made his first-class debut in 1919–20 for Queensland against Victoria, taking four wickets. In 1920–21 he took 3–89 for Queensland against the touring English side.

He was selected for the Australian side which toured New Zealand in 1920–21 and took 47 first-class wickets at an average of 12. According to Wisden, "Many thought he should have been included in the 1921 side to England, which was distinctly weak in slow-wicket bowling, though in the event it did not require it."

Wisden later said, "There was far greater surprise when he was omitted from the 1926 side, and no less a judge than M. A. Noble advocated his inclusion. He would at least have saved Macartney from being bowled to death in the early weeks of the tour and in the vital last Test on a rain-affected pitch he might easily have tipped the scales in Australia's favour."

Hornibrook made his Test debut in the last game of the 1928–29 Ashes. He took four wickets and made some useful runs in Australia's victory. In 1929–30 he took 35 first-class wickets at an average of 32.

=== 1930 Ashes ===
Hornibrook toured England for the 1930 Ashes series. He played in all the Tests, taking 13 wickets. He took 96 wickets on the tour in all, Australia's second best bowler after Clarrie Grimmett.

Hornibrook's best performance came in the 5th Test. The series was 1–1, with England only having to draw to retain the Ashes. They batted first and scored 405, with Hornibrook taking no wickets. Australia batted and made 695. When England batted again Hornibrook took 7–92 and England were dismissed for 251. According to Wisden, "his figures suggest, what good critics confirm, that he bowled far too many bad balls: one indeed said that bogey for a good slow left-hander on that wicket would have been seven for 30. Perhaps had he had longer experience of English conditions he would have been better. At any rate by then he was past his peak—his arm had dropped and he was more full-chested. At the end of the tour he retired from first-class cricket."

=== Later career ===
Hornibrook played one Sheffield Shield game in 1930–31 and made a comeback to first class cricket in 1933–34. It was not successful but he continued to play club cricket for Toombul District Cricket Club.

Hornibrook retired from club cricket in 1940.

== Personal life ==
Hornibrook married Blanche Baldwin in Brisbane in June 1927. He died in Brisbane in August 1976.
