= Henry Armstrong (umpire) =

Australian cricket umpire (1885–1945)

Henry James Armstrong (21 June 1885 – 23 March 1945) was an Australian cricket Test match umpire.

Armstrong was born in the inner Sydney suburb of Glebe. He umpired one Test match, between Australia and the West Indies at Sydney on 27 February to 4 March 1931. In this match, in which the West Indies gained their first win over Australia, he was partnered by Walter French.

He umpired 12 Sheffield Shield matches in Sydney between 1930 and 1937. In the 1930s he served for some years as honorary secretary of the New South Wales Umpires' Association.

Armstrong married Essie Hill in November 1911. They had two daughters. He died at their home in the Sydney suburb of Wahroonga in March 1945.

== See also ==
- Australian Test Cricket Umpires
- List of Test cricket umpires
