= Frank Martin (cricketer) =

Jamaican cricketer

Freddie Martin
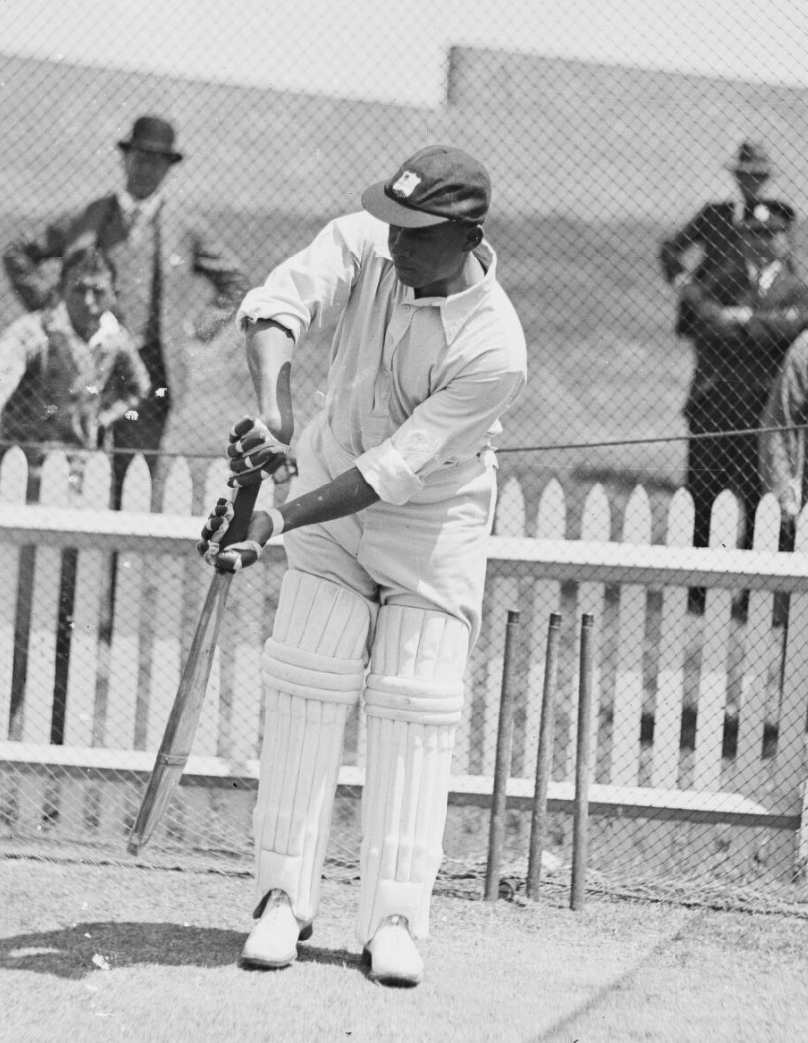

Personal information
- Full name: Frank Reginald Martin
- Born: 12 October 1893; Kingston, Jamaica
- Died: 23 November 1967 (aged 74); Kingston, Jamaica
- Batting: Left-handed
- Bowling: Slow left-arm orthodox

International information
- National side: West Indies
- Test debut (cap 7): 23 June 1928 v England
- Last Test: 27 February 1931 v Australia

Domestic team information
- Years: Team
- 1924–1930: Jamaica

Career statistics
| Competition | Tests | First-class |
|---|---|---|
| Matches | 9 | 65 |
| Runs scored | 486 | 3,589 |
| Batting average | 28.58 | 37.77 |
| 100s/50s | 1/0 | 6/16 |
| Top score | 123* | 204* |
| Balls bowled | 1,346 | 7,934 |
| Wickets | 8 | 74 |
| Bowling average | 77.37 | 42.55 |
| 5 wickets in innings | 0 | 1 |
| 10 wickets in match | 0 | 0 |
| Best bowling | 3/91 | 5/90 |
| Catches/stumpings | 2/– | 19/– |
- Source: CricketArchive, 10 January 2010

Frank Reginald "Freddie" Martin (12 October 1893 – 23 November 1967) was a Jamaican cricketer who played in West Indies' first Test in their inaugural Test tour of England.

A left-handed batsman and slow left-arm bowler born in Kingston, Jamaica, Martin played domestic cricket for Jamaica. He played in every Test in both of the West Indies' first two Test tours, in England in 1928 and in Australia in 1930-31. In the fifth Test at Sydney of the 1930-31 tour, he scored 123 not out in the first innings against the strong Australian bowling of the day, part of the West Indies' 350 for 6. Later he took four wickets for 111 runs. This was the West Indies' first victory away from home, and Martin's last Test, although he toured England again in 1933. He died in Kingston at the age of 74.

Martin c. 1933
