= Gerald James (cricketer) =

Australian cricketer (1908–1967)

Personal information
- Born: 22 March 1908; New Norfolk, Tasmania, Australia
- Died: 24 December 1967 (aged 59); Hobart, Tasmania, Australia

Domestic team information
- Years: Team
- 1928-1946: Tasmania
- Source: Cricinfo, 4 March 2016

Gerald James (22 March 1908 – 24 December 1967) was an Australian cricketer. He played 35 first-class matches for Tasmania between 1928 and 1946.

== See also ==
- List of Tasmanian representative cricketers
