= Bill Parry (umpire) =

Welsh-born English cricket umpire

Personal information
- Full name: William Robert Parry
- Born: 28 June 1890; Bangor
- Died: 9 July 1955 (aged 65); Taunton

Umpiring information
- Tests umpired: 5 (1928–1930)
- Source: Cricinfo, 14 July 2013

William Robert Parry (28 June 1890 – 9 July 1955) was a test match umpire. Born in Bangor in 1890 he began umpiring Minor County matches in the 1920s after losing a leg in the Great War. Known for his idiosyncratic stance, as a result of his disability, he stood in 5 Test matches between 1928 and 1930 before withdrawing from the first class list in 1935 to pursue business interests. He was injured in a match between Yorkshire and Gloucestershire in 1927 when he fell as he hurried into position to judge a run out and broke the remains of his amputated limb. He died in Taunton in 1955.
