= Tommy Scott (cricketer) =

Jamaican cricketer

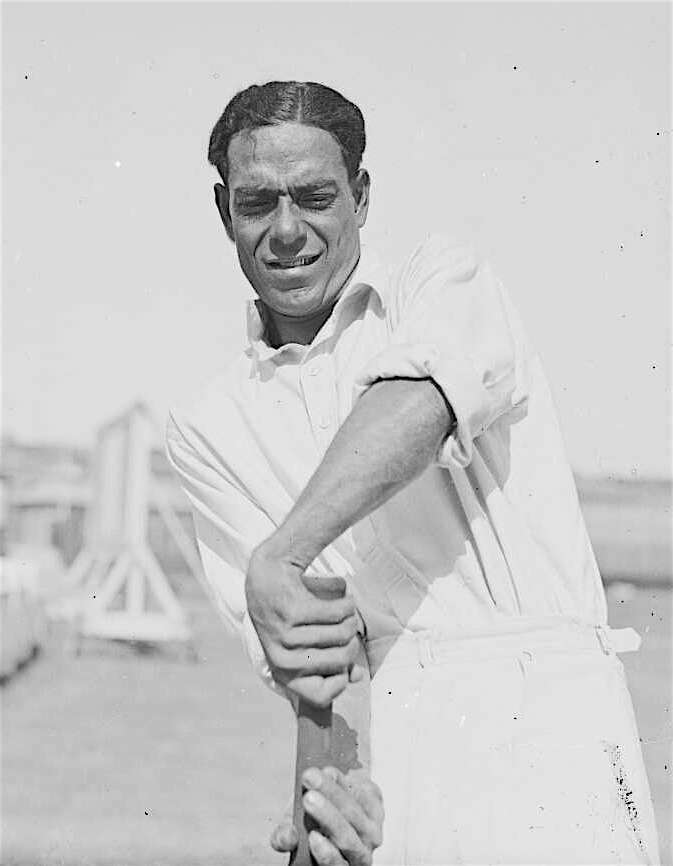

Personal information
- Full name: Oscar Charles Scott
- Born: 14 August 1892; Kingston, Jamaica
- Died: 15 June 1961 (aged 68); Kingston, Jamaica
- Nickname: Tommy
- Batting: Right-handed
- Bowling: Leg break
- Relatives: Alfred Scott (son)

International information
- National side: West Indies
- Test debut (cap 13): 21 July 1928 v England
- Last Test: 27 February 1931 v Australia

Domestic team information
- Years: Team
- 1910–1935: Jamaica

Career statistics
Competition	Tests	First-class
Matches	8	45
Runs scored	171	1,317
Batting average	17.10	24.38
100s/50s	0/0	0/9
Top score	35	94
Balls bowled	1,405	9,706
Wickets	22	182
Bowling average	42.04	30.52
5 wickets in innings	1	14
10 wickets in match	0	5
Best bowling	5/266	8/67
Catches/stumpings	0/–	14/–
- Source: Cricket Archive, 26 October 2010

Oscar Charles "Tommy" Scott (4 August 1892 – 15 June 1961) was a Jamaican cricketer who played in West Indies' inaugural Test tour of England in 1928.

Scott was born in Franklyn Town, Kingston, Jamaica. A leg-spinner and lower-order batsman, he took 11 for 138 for Jamaica against the English team in 1910-11 on his first-class debut at the age of 18. His best innings figures were 8 for 67 (12 for 132 in the match) in Jamaica's innings victory over L. H. Tennyson's XI in 1927–28. He played in eight Tests for the West Indies, including all five in the tour of Australia in 1930–31, when he finished the Australian first innings in the First Test by taking four wickets in nine deliveries without cost.

Scott holds the record for the most runs conceded by a bowler in a Test. His match figures of 9 for 374, against England at Kingston in 1929–30, included a first innings bowling analysis of 80.2 overs, 13 maidens, 266 runs for 5 wickets, as England amassed 849 in a timeless Test. The Australian bowler Jason Krejza conceded 358 in the Fourth Test between Australia and India in 2008–09.

Scott died in Kingston at the age of 68. His son Alfred, also a leg-spinner, played one Test in 1953.
