= List of England cricketers who have taken five-wicket hauls on Test debut =

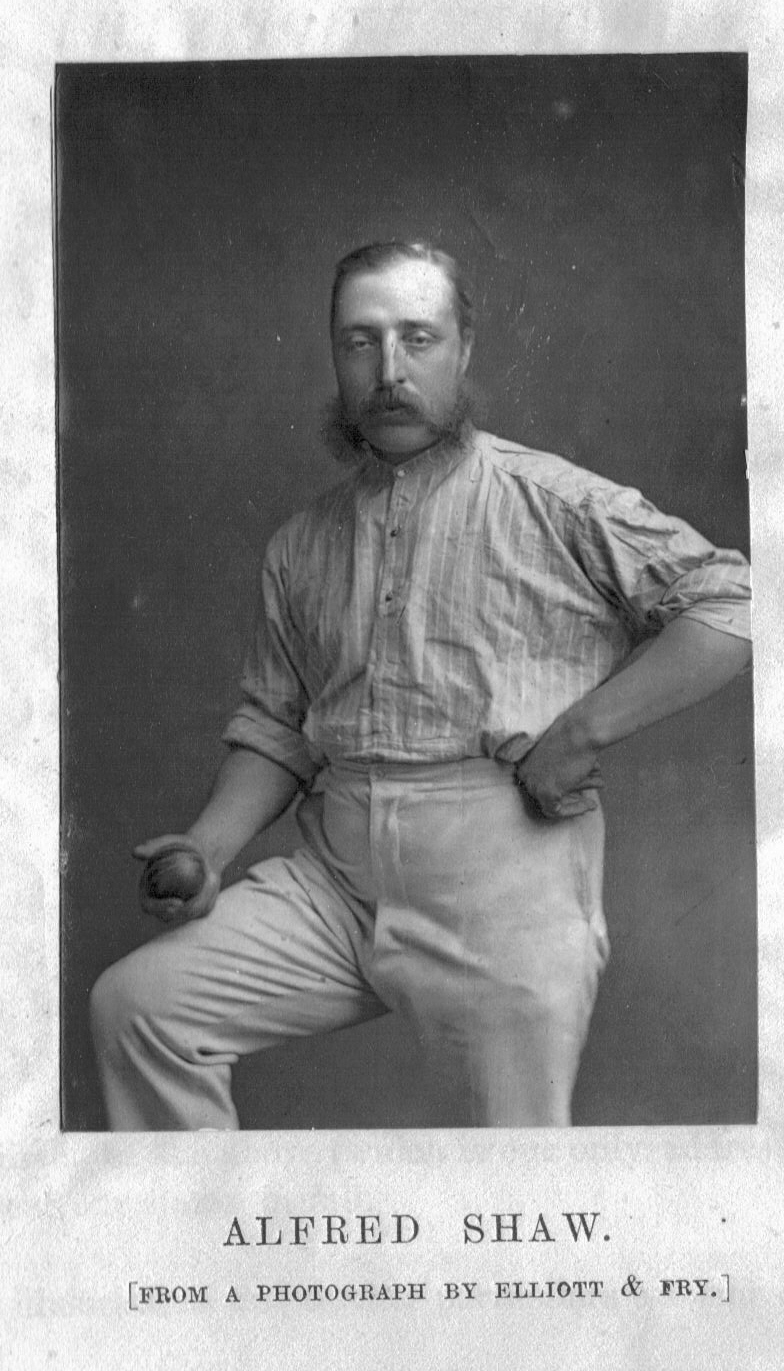
Alfred Shaw was the first player to take five wickets on his debut for England in Test cricket.

In cricket, a five-wicket haul (also known as a "five-for" or "fifer") refers to a bowler taking five or more wickets in a single innings. This is regarded as a significant achievement. As of 2026, 181 cricketers have taken a five-wicket haul on their debut in a Test match, with 52 of them being England players. Alfred Shaw was the first Englishman to take a five-wicket haul at Test debut. He took five wickets for 38 runs in the first Test in history, against Australia at the Melbourne Cricket Ground in March 1877, but could not prevent England's defeat. Two Australian bowlers also picked up fifers in the same match. The most recent Englishman to achieve the feat was Gus Atkinson, who took seven wickets for 45 runs against West Indies at Lord's in July 2024. Dominic Cork's seven wickets for 43 runs against West Indies in the second Test of the 1995 series are the best bowling figures for an Englishman on debut.

== Key ==
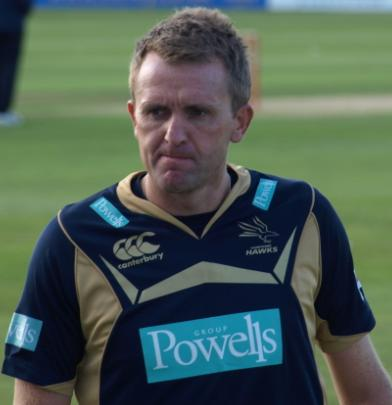
Dominic Cork has the best bowling figures by an England debutant.

Symbol	Meaning
Date	Date the match was held, or starting date of the match for Test matches
Inn	The innings of the match in which the five-wicket haul was taken
Overs	Number of overs bowled in that innings
Runs	Runs conceded
Wkts	Number of wickets taken
Econ	Bowling economy rate (average runs per over)
Batsmen	The batsmen whose wickets were taken in the five-wicket haul
Result	The result for the England team in that match
†	Bowler selected as "Man of the match"
‡	10 wickets or more taken in the match
Drawn	The match was drawn

== Five-wicket hauls ==
Five-wicket hauls on Test debut by English bowlers
No.	Bowler	Date	Ground	Against	Inn	Overs (Note: Unless otherwise stated, an over consists of 6 legal deliveries.)	Runs	Wkts	Econ (Note: Calculated as the runs conceded off a 6-ball over.)	Batsmen	Result
1	Alfred Shaw	15 March 1877	Melbourne Cricket Ground, Melbourne, Australia	Australia	2	34 (Note: 4-ball overs were used in this match.)	38	5	1.67	Nat Thomson; Tom Garrett; Bransby Cooper; Jack Blackham; Dave Gregory	Lost
2	Fred Morley	6 September 1880	The Oval, London, United Kingdom	Australia	3	32	56	5	2.62	Alec Bannerman; Jim Slight; Jack Blackham; Percy McDonnell; Joey Palmer	Won
3	Bobby Peel	12 December 1884	Adelaide Oval, Adelaide, Australia	Australia	3	40.1	51	5	1.90	Jack Blackham; Billy Murdoch; Tup Scott; George Giffen; George Alexander	Won
4	C. Aubrey Smith	12 March 1889	St George's Park, Port Elizabeth, South Africa	South Africa	1	13.2	19	5	2.11	Bernard Tancred; Robert Stewart; Fred Smith; Charlie Finlason; Gus Kempis	Won
5 (Note: Frederick Martin took 6 wickets in both innings of his first Test Match. Both innings are listed, but he is only counted once.)	Frederick Martin ‡	11 August 1890	The Oval, London, United Kingdom	Australia	1	27 (Note: 5-ball overs were used in this match.)	50	6	2.22	Jack Lyons; Jack Barrett; Billy Murdoch; Jack Blackham; Harry Trott; Percie Charlton	Won
5	Frederick Martin ‡	11 August 1890	The Oval, London, United Kingdom	Australia	3	30.2	52	6	2.05	Jack Barrett; Jack Lyons; Kenny Burn; Charles Turner; Harry Trott; Hugh Trumble	Won
6	Bill Lockwood	17 July 1893	Lord's, London, United Kingdom	Australia	2	45	101	6	2.69	Jack Lyons; George Giffen; Alec Bannerman; Bob McLeod; Harry Trott; Syd Gregory	Drawn
7 (Note: Tom Richardson took 5 wickets in both innings of his first Test Match. Both innings are listed, but he is only counted once.)	Tom Richardson ‡	24 August 1893	Old Trafford, Manchester, United Kingdom	Australia	1	23.4	49	5	2.47	George Giffen; Harry Trott; William Bruce; Charles Turner; Hugh Trumble	Drawn
7	Tom Richardson ‡	24 August 1893	Old Trafford, Manchester, United Kingdom	Australia	3	44	107	5	2.91	George Giffen; Bob McLeod; William Bruce; Syd Gregory; Alec Bannerman	Drawn
8	Christopher Heseltine	2 March 1896	Old Wanderers, Johannesburg, South Africa	South Africa	4	16.2	38	5	2.78	Thomas Routledge; Robert Poore; Baberton Halliwell; Charlie Llewellyn; George Rowe	Won
9	Bill Bradley	17 July 1899	Old Trafford, Manchester, United Kingdom	Australia	2	33	67	5	2.43	Frank Laver; Bill Howell; Jack Worrall; Hugh Trumble; Frank Iredale	Drawn
10	Sydney Barnes	13 December 1901	Sydney Cricket Ground, Sydney, Australia	Australia	2	35.1	65	5	1.84	Victor Trumper; Clem Hill; Charlie McLeod; Joe Darling; Ernie Jones	Drawn
11	Len Braund	13 December 1901	Sydney Cricket Ground, Sydney, Australia	Australia	3	28.4	61	5	2.12	Joe Darling; Clem Hill; Frank Laver; Syd Gregory; Ernie Jones	Drawn
12	Arnold Warren	3 July 1905	Headingley, Leeds, United Kingdom	Australia	2	19.2	57	5	2.94	Victor Trumper; Monty Noble; Joe Darling; Warwick Armstrong; Frank Laver	Drawn
13	Walter Lees	2 January 1906	Old Wanderers, Johannesburg, South Africa	South Africa	2	23.1	34	5	1.46	Louis Tancred; Maitland Hathorn; Gordan White; Jimmy Sinclair; Percy Sherwell	Lost
14	Douglas Carr	9 August 1909	The Oval, London, United Kingdom	Australia	1	34	146	5	4.29	Syd Gregory; Monty Noble; Warwick Armstrong; Tibby Cotter; Sammy Carter	Drawn
15	George Simpson-Hayward	1 January 1910	Old Wanderers, Johannesburg, South Africa	South Africa	1	16	43	6	2.68	Billy Zulch; Jimmy Sinclair; Mick Commaille; Reggie Schwarz; Aubrey Faulkner; Bert Vogler	Lost
16	Frank Foster	15 December 1911	Sydney Cricket Ground, Sydney, Australia	Australia	3	31.3	92	5	2.92	Warren Bardsley; Clem Hill; Warwick Armstrong; Ranji Hordern; Sammy Carter	Lost
17	George Macaulay	1 January 1923	Newlands, Cape Town, South Africa	South Africa	3	37	64	5	1.64	Bob Catterall; Herbie Taylor; William Ling; William Brann; Cyril Francois	Won
18	Wally Hammond	24 December 1927	Newlands, Cape Town, South Africa	South Africa	3	21.2	36	5	1.68	Jacobus Duminy; Bob Catterall; Herbie Taylor; Cyril Vincent; Henry Promnitz	Won
19	Maurice Allom	10 January 1930	Lancaster Park, Christchurch, New Zealand	New Zealand	1	19	38	5	2.00	Stewie Dempster; Tom Lowry; Ken James; Ted Badcock; Bill Merritt	Won
20	James Langridge	22 July 1933	Old Trafford, Manchester, United Kingdom	West Indies	3	17	56	7	3.29	Clifford Roach; George Headley; Teddy Hoad; Archie Wiles; Jackie Grant; Ellis Achong; Baron Constantine	Drawn
21 (Note: Charles Marriott took 5 wickets in the first innings of his first Test Match, and 6 in the second innings. Both innings are listed, but he is only counted once.)	Charles Marriott ‡	12 August 1933	The Oval, London, United Kingdom	West Indies	2	11.5	37	5	3.12	George Headley; Cyril Merry; Jackie Grant; Vincent Valentine; Herman Griffith	Won
21	Charles Marriott ‡	12 August 1933	The Oval, London, United Kingdom	West Indies	3	29.2	59	6	2.01	Clifford Roach; Ben Sealey; Oscar Da Costa; Vincent Valentine; Ellis Achong; Herman Griffith	Won
22 (Note: Ken Farnes took 5 wickets in both innings of his first Test Match. Both innings are listed, but he is only counted once.)	Ken Farnes ‡	8 June 1934	Trent Bridge, Nottingham, United Kingdom	Australia	1	40.2	102	5	2.52	Bill Ponsford; Bill Woodfull; Stan McCabe; Arthur Chipperfield; Bill O'Reilly	Lost
22	Ken Farnes ‡	8 June 1934	Trent Bridge, Nottingham, United Kingdom	Australia	3	25	77	5	3.08	Bill Woodfull; Donald Bradman; Stan McCabe; Len Darling; Arthur Chipperfield	Lost
23	Jim Smith	8 January 1935	Kensington Oval, Bridgetown, Barbados	West Indies	3	8	16	5	2.00	Rolph Grant; Manny Martindale; Ellis Achong; Cyril Christiani; Leslie Hylton	Won
24	Reg Perks	3 March 1939	Kingsmead, Durban, South Africa	South Africa	1	41 (Note: 8-ball overs were used in this match.)	100	5	1.82	Eric Rowan; Pieter van der Bijl; Ken Viljoen; Dudley Nourse; Ronnie Grieveson	Drawn
25	Bill Copson	24 June 1939	Lord's, London, United Kingdom	West Indies	1	41	100	5	1.82	Rolph Grant; Bam Bam Weekes; Baron Constantine; George Headley; Ivan Barrow	Won
26	Alec Bedser ‡	22 June 1946	Lord's, London, United Kingdom	India	1	29.1	49	7	1.68	Vijay Merchant; Lala Amarnath; Vijay Hazare; Nawab of Pataudi Snr; Dattaram Hindlekar; C.S. Nayudu; Sadu Shinde	Won
27	Dick Pollard	20 July 1946	Old Trafford, Manchester, United Kingdom	India	2	27	24	5	0.88	Mushtaq Ali; Abdul Kardar; Vinoo Mankad; Vijay Merchant; Lala Amarnath	Won
28	Jim Laker	21 January 1948	Kensington Oval, Bridgetown, Barbados	West Indies	1	37	103	7	2.78	Clyde Walcott; George Headley; Gerry Gomez; Robert Christiani; Foffie Williams; Wilfred Ferguson; Berkeley Gaskin	Drawn
29	Trevor Bailey	11 June 1949	Headingley, Leeds, United Kingdom	New Zealand	2	32.3	118	6	3.63	Verdun Scott; Merv Wallace; Walter Hadlee; Martin Donnelly; Harry Cave; Frank Mooney	Drawn
30	Bob Berry	8 June 1950	Old Trafford, Manchester, United Kingdom	West Indies	2	31.5	63	5	1.97	Allan Rae; Frank Worrell; Clyde Walcott; Robert Christiani; Alf Valentine	Won
31	Bob Appleyard	1 July 1954	Trent Bridge, Nottingham, United Kingdom	Pakistan	1	17	51	5	3.00	Hanif Mohammad; Maqsood Ahmed; Waqar Hasan; Imtiaz Ahmed; Khalid Hasan	Won
32	Len Coldwell	21 June 1962	Lord's, London, United Kingdom	Pakistan	3	41	85	6	2.07	Hanif Mohammad; Saeed Ahmed; Nasim-ul-Ghani; Javed Burki; Imtiaz Ahmed; Mahmood Hussain	Won
33	David Larter	16 August 1962	The Oval, London, United Kingdom	Pakistan	2	25	57	5	2.28	Ijaz Butt; Mushtaq Mohammad; Javed Burki; Wallis Mathias; Hanif Mohammad	Won
34	Ken Shuttleworth	27 November 1970	The Gabba, Brisbane, Australia	Australia	3	17.5	47	5	2.00	Keith Stackpole; Rod Marsh; Terry Jenner; John Gleeson; Graham McKenzie	Drawn
35	Phil Edmonds	14 August 1975	Headingley, Leeds, United Kingdom	Australia	2	20	28	5	1.40	Greg Chappell; Ross Edwards; Ian Chappell; Max Walker; Doug Walters	Drawn
36	John Lever ‡	17 December 1976	Feroz Shah Kotla Ground, Delhi, India	India	2	23	46	7	2.00	Anshuman Gaekwad; Mohinder Amarnath; Gundappa Viswanath; Srinivas Venkataraghavan; Brijesh Patel; Sunil Gavaskar; Syed Kirmani	Won
37	Ian Botham	28 July 1977	Trent Bridge, Nottingham, United Kingdom	Australia	1	20	74	5	3.70	Greg Chappell; Doug Walters; Rod Marsh; Max Walker; Jeff Thomson	Won
38	Nick Cook	11 August 1983	Lord's, London, United Kingdom	New Zealand	2	26	35	5	1.34	Geoff Howarth; Bruce Edgar; Jeremy Coney; John Bracewell; Richard Hadlee	Won
39	Neil Mallender	23 July 1992	Headingley, Leeds, United Kingdom	Pakistan	3	23	50	5	2.17	Aamer Sohail; Asif Mujtaba; Javed Miandad; Moin Khan; Waqar Younis	Won
40	Peter Such	3 June 1993	Old Trafford, Manchester, United Kingdom	Australia	1	33.3	67	6	2.00	David Boon; Mark Taylor; Steve Waugh; Allan Border; Brendon Julian; Merv Hughes	Lost
41	Dominic Cork †	22 June 1995	Lord's, London, United Kingdom	West Indies	4	19.3	43	7	2.20	Jimmy Adams; Richie Richardson; Keith Arthurton; Ottis Gibson; Sherwin Campbell; Curtly Ambrose; Courtney Walsh	Won
42	James Anderson	22 May 2003	Lord's, London, United Kingdom	Zimbabwe	2	16	73	5	4.56	Mark Vermeulen; Heath Streak; Travis Friend; Andy Blignaut; Douglas Hondo	Won
43	Richard Johnson †	5 June 2003	Riverside Ground, Chester-le-Street, United Kingdom	Zimbabwe	2	12	33	6	2.75	Mark Vermeulen; Stuart Carlisle; Sean Ervine; Travis Friend; Heath Streak; Tatenda Taibu	Won
44	James Kirtley †	14 August 2003	Trent Bridge, Nottingham, United Kingdom	South Africa	4	16.2	34	6	2.08	Graeme Smith; Jacques Rudolph; Neil McKenzie; Andrew Hall; Paul Adams; Mark Boucher	Won
45	Graham Onions	6 May 2009	Lord's, London, United Kingdom	West Indies	2	9.3	38	5	4.00	Lendl Simmons; Jerome Taylor; Sulieman Benn; Denesh Ramdin; Lionel Baker	Won
46	Adil Rashid	13 October 2015	Sheikh Zayed Stadium, Abu Dhabi, United Arab Emirates	Pakistan	3	15.5	64	5	3.39	Younis Khan; Asad Shafiq; Sarfraz Ahmed; Zulfiqar Babar; Imran Khan	Drawn
47	Toby Roland-Jones	27 July 2017	The Oval, London, United Kingdom	South Africa	2	16.4	57	5	3.42	Dean Elgar; Heino Kuhn; Hashim Amla; Quinton de Kock; Temba Bavuma	Won
48	Will Jacks	1 December 2022	Rawalpindi Cricket Stadium, Rawalpindi, Pakistan	Pakistan	2	40.3	161	6	3.97	Abdullah Shafique; Babar Azam; Agha Salman; Naseem Shah; Zahid Mahmood; Haris Rauf	Won
49	Rehan Ahmed	17 December 2022	National Stadium, Karachi, Pakistan	Pakistan	3	14.5	48	5	3.23	Babar Azam; Mohammad Rizwan; Saud Shakeel; Mohammad Wasim; Agha Salman	Won
50	Josh Tongue	3 June 2023	Lords, London, United Kingdom	Ireland	3	21	66	5	3.14	Peter Moor; Andrew Balbirnie; Paul Stirling; Harry Tector; Fionn Hand	Won
51	Tom Hartley	25 January 2024	Rajiv Gandhi International Cricket Stadium, Hyderabad, India	India	4	26.2	62	7	2.35	Rohit Sharma; Yashasvi Jaiswal; Shubman Gill; Axar Patel; Srikar Bharat; Ravichandran Ashwin; Mohammed Siraj	Won
52	Gus Atkinson †	10 July 2024	Lord's, London, England	West Indies	1	12	45	7	3.75	Kraigg Brathwaite; Kirk McKenzie; Alick Athanaze; Jason Holder; Joshua Da Silva; Alzarri Joseph; Shamar Joseph	Won
52	Gus Atkinson †	10 July 2024	Lord's, London, England	West Indies	3	14	61	5	4.35	Kavem Hodge; Jason Holder; Alzarri Joseph; Shamar Joseph; Jayden Seales	Won
