= West Indian cricket team in England in 1933 =

International cricket tour

The West Indies cricket team toured England in 1933, playing three Test matches, losing two of them and drawing the other. In all, the side played 30 first-class matches, winning only five and losing nine.

The batting was led by George Headley, who scored almost twice as many runs as the next highest aggregate and averaged 66 runs per innings (the next best was 39). The bowling was spearheaded by the pace of Manny Martindale, from Barbados, who took 14 wickets in the Tests and 103 on the tour. He cut Wally Hammond's chin open at Old Trafford and, in partnership with Learie Constantine in this match, used the same bodyline tactics England had used the previous winter against Australia.

Wisden in 1934 had George Headley as its Cricketer of the Year alongside English players Cyril Walters, Fred Bakewell, Les Townsend and Morris Nichols (see Wisden in Cricinfo).

== The touring team ==
The team was captained by the former Cambridge University blue Jackie Grant, who had been captain on the tour of Australia in 1930–31.

The full team was:

- Jackie Grant, captain (T&T)
- Teddy Hoad, vice-captain (Barbados)
- Ellis Achong (T&T)
- Ivan Barrow, wicket-keeper (Jamaica)
- Cyril Christiani, wicket-keeper (Guyana)
- Oscar Da Costa (Jamaica)
- Herman Griffith (Barbados)
- George Headley (Jamaica)
- Freddie Martin (Jamaica)
- Manny Martindale (Barbados)
- Cyril Merry (T&T)
- Clifford Roach (T&T)
- Ben Sealey (T&T)
- Vincent Valentine (Jamaica)
- Archie Wiles (T&T)

In addition to the regular touring party, Learie Constantine, then of T&T but playing Lancashire League cricket in England and not available for the full tour, played in one Test and four other first-class matches, and George Francis of Barbados, also engaged in League cricket, played in the first Test at Lord's, but was not called on for any other first-class matches. Rolph Grant of T&T, brother of the captain and an undergraduate at Cambridge University, played in the match against the university and Clifford Inniss of Barbados, an undergraduate at Oxford, played in the match against Oxford University and in one other first-class match against MCC.

Constantine, Francis, Griffith, Hoad, Martin and Roach had been members of the 1928 West Indies side which toured England and were the first to play Test cricket. All six of them played in Tests on that tour. Achong, Barrow, Da Costa and Headley had made their Test debuts in the 1929–30 season against the England team. Jackie Grant's first Test appearances were on the 1930-31 tour of Australia. Christiani, Martindale, Merry, Sealey and Wiles had not played Test cricket before this tour and all of them except Christiani played Tests in the 1933 series. Christiani made his Test debut in the 1934-35 series against England, as did Rolph Grant. The other co-opted player on this tour, Clifford Inniss, never played Test cricket.

The manager of the team was John Kidney, who played 11 first-class matches for Barbados between 1909 and 1932. He later managed the 1939 touring team in England.

== The Test matches ==
Three Test matches, each of three days' duration, were played.

=== First Test, at Lord's, 24, 26, 27 June ===
24–27 June 1939
Scorecard

| England | v | West Indies |
| 296 (101 overs); LEG Ames 83*; EA Martindale 4/85 (24 overs) | | 97 (58.5 overs); GC Grant 26; RWV Robins 6/32 (11.5 overs) |
| | | 172 (f/o) (61.1 overs); GA Headley 50; H Verity 4/45 (18.1 overs) |

England won by an innings and 27 runs
Lord's, London
Umpires: F Chester and A Dolphin

- England won the toss and elected to bat.
- 25 June was taken as a rest day
- CF Walters (ENG), and CA Merry and EA Martindale (both WIN) made their Test debuts.

West Indies lost six first-innings wickets for 55 before the end of the second day, and the other four in 65 minutes on the final morning. Walter Robins took six wickets for 32 runs. Following on 199 behind, West Indies did better, with Headley making 50 out of 64 and Hoad and Grant adding 52 for the fourth wicket. But George Macaulay and Hedley Verity each took four wickets and the match was won in mid-afternoon.

=== Second Test, at Manchester, 22, 24, 25 July ===
22–25 July 1933
Scorecard

| West Indies | v | England |
| 375 (135.4 overs); GA Headley 169*; EW Clark 4/99 (40 overs) | | 374 (140.4 overs); DR Jardine 127; EA Martindale 5/73 (23.4 overs) |
| 225 (60.1 overs); CA Roach 64; LN Constantine 64; J Langridge 7/56 (17 overs) |

Match drawn
Old Trafford, Manchester
Umpires: J Hardstaff and EJ Smith

- West Indies won the toss and elected to bat.
- 23 July was taken as a rest day
- CA Wiles and VA Valentine (both WIN), and J Langridge (ENG) made their Test debuts.

Barrow and Headley made the first centuries for West Indies in Tests in England and put on 200 for the second wicket before Barrow was out for 105. Headley went on to an unbeaten 169 but of the other batsmen only Constantine, released from his club contract for this match, made much impact, his 31 coming out of 36. Martindale and Constantine used the bodyline "leg-theory" style of bowling fast and short to a packed leg-side field, and England lost four wickets for 134, including Hammond, who returned to bat after having his chin split open by a short-pitched ball. Douglas Jardine led the resistance, putting on 83 with Ames and 140 with Robins. Jardine's 127 was his first Test match century. Martindale took five wickets for 73 runs. When West Indies batted a second time, England fast bowler Edward Clark also bowled leg-theory, but with little success. James Langridge, in his first Test, took seven wickets for 56, but Roach made 64 and Constantine the same number, and the match was left drawn when the West Indies second innings ended.

=== Third Test, at The Oval, 12, 14, 15 August ===
12–15 August 1933
Scorecard

| England | v | West Indies |
| 312 (108.5 overs); AH Bakewell 107; EA Martindale 5/93 (24.5 overs) | | 100 (29.5 overs); BJ Sealey 29; CS Marriott 5/37 (11.5 overs) |
| | | 195 (f/o) (71.2 overs); CA Roach 56; CS Marriott 6/59 (29.2 overs) |

England won by an innings and 17 runs
The Oval, London
Umpires: F Chester and J Hardstaff

- England won the toss and elected to bat.
- 13 August was taken as a rest day
- CJ Barnett and CS Marriott both ENG), and BJ Sealey (WIN) made their Test debuts.

An experimental England side under the captaincy of Bob Wyatt was reliant on 107 from Fred Bakewell, made out of 194. Charlie Barnett, with 52 in his first Test, then put on 95 in 85 minutes for the eighth wicket with Stan Nichols, who made 49. When West Indies batted, only debutant Sealey, with 29, made much of the bowling of Clark, Nichols and another player new to Test cricket, Charles Marriott. Marriott followed his five for 37 with six for 59 in the second innings, giving match figures of 11 for 96. Roach made 56 and Da Costa 35, but the match was over early on the third day.

== Other first-class matches ==
Wisden in 1934 says the team played in 30 first-class matches, including the three test matches against England, and of these they won five, drew 16 and lost nine. Outside the first-class fixtures they engaged in eight of lesser importance, being successful in three of these and drawing the other five.

For source, see Wisden 1934 in Cricinfo.

== Sources ==
- S. J. Southerton, "The West Indies team in England 1933" from Wisden 1934

== Sources ==
- Michael Manley, A History of West Indies Cricket, Andre Deutsch, 1988
