= Kenneth J. Grant =

Canadian presbyterian missionary (1839–1932)

Rev. Kenneth James Grant (1839–1932) was a Canadian Presbyterian missionary who was one of the founding fathers of the Presbyterian Church of Trinidad and Tobago and was a founder of secondary education among East Indians.

Grant was born in Scotch Hill, Pictou County, Nova Scotia. In 1854, he started teaching in Cape John, Nova Scotia after receiving his teachers' certificate. He later started studying Theology, attending school in Truro, Nova Scotia, graduating in 1859, and also in Princeton, New Jersey, until moving to Trinidad and Tobago in 1870. There, he started teaching at the government-funded Sabbath School on Cicero Street, teaching the local Indians while he himself also learned Hindi. He also founded Naparima College in 1894, the first secondary school on the island. Grant Memorial Presbyterian School in San Fernando is named in his memory. Dr. Grant also helped found Hillview College, where one of the school's four houses is named Grant House, with its colour being blue. A picture of him hangs in the administration building.

Grant died in 1932 in Nova Scotia. His son, Thomas, was a prominent businessman in Trinidad and Tobago and founded T. Geddes Grant Ltd. Grant's grandsons Fred and Sir Lindsay ran the company, and Jackie and Rolph captained the West Indies Test cricket team.
