= International cricket in 1934–35 =

International cricket season

The 1934–35 international cricket season was from September 1934 to April 1935. The season consists one international tour.

== Season overview ==
International tours
Start date	Home team	Away team	Results [Matches]			
Start date	Home team	Away team	Test	ODI	FC	LA
8 January 1935	West Indies	England	2–1 [4]	—	—	—

== January ==
=== England in the West Indies ===
Test Series
No.	Date	Home captain	Away captain	Venue	Result
Test 238	8–10 January	Jackie Grant	Bob Wyatt	Kensington Oval, Bridgetown	England by 4 wickets
Test 239	24–28 January	Jackie Grant	Bob Wyatt	Queen's Park Oval, Port of Spain	West Indies by 217 runs
Test 240	14–18 February	Jackie Grant	Bob Wyatt	Bourda, Georgetown	Match drawn
Test 241	14–18 March	Jackie Grant	Bob Wyatt	Sabina Park, Kingston	West Indies by an innings and 161 runs
