= David Merry (cricketer) =

Tobagonian cricketer

Personal information
- Born: 1923; Tobago
- Died: 4 May 1944 (aged 21) near Penhold, Alberta, Canada
- Relatives: Cyril Merry (brother)

Domestic team information
- Years: Team
- 1940–1941: Trinidad

Career statistics
Competition	First-class
Matches	2
Runs scored	135
Batting average	45.00
100s/50s	–/1
Top score	80
Balls bowled	–
Wickets	–
Bowling average	–
5 wickets in innings	–
10 wickets in match	–
Best bowling	–
Catches/stumpings	1/–
- Source: Cricinfo, 26 July 2020

David Merry (1923 – 4 May 1944) was a Tobagonian first-class cricketer and Royal Air Force officer.

Born in Tobago in 1923, Merry was educated at the Queen's Royal College, where he played cricket and association football. He appeared in two first-class matches for Trinidad against Barbados, both in February 1941 and both at the Queen's Park Oval in Port of Spain. During these two matches, Merry scored 135 runs with a batting average of 45 and a high score of 80. He also represented North Trinidad in two matches of the Beaumont Cup, scoring 114 runs in his second appearance. Merry's final cricket match, representing the West Indies against Lancashire, took place on 7 June 1942 at Longsight. He gained 9 runs before being caught by Henry Butterworth and bowled by Winston Place.

Merry served as a flying officer in the Royal Air Force Volunteer Reserve during the Second World War and was assigned as a flying instructor to the No. 36 Service Flying Training School in Canada. Piloting Airspeed Oxford X6734 during a night training exercise on 4 May 1944, Merry died when the aircraft crashed near Penhold. He had held the aircraft steady to allow his pupils to bail out and was consequently killed. Merry is buried at the Red Deer Cemetery.
