= Arthur Blackman =

English cricketer

Personal information
- Full name: Arthur Blackman
- Born: 13 October 1853; Dartford, Kent
- Died: 6 April 1908 (aged 54); Preston, Sussex
- Height: 6 ft 5 in (1.96 m)
- Batting: Right-handed
- Bowling: Right-arm roundarm medium

Domestic team information
- Years: Team
- 1878: Surrey
- 1879–1880: Kent
- 1881–1887: Sussex

Career statistics
Competition	First-class
Matches	20
Runs scored	399
Batting average	11.73
100s/50s	0/1
Top score	73
Balls bowled	672
Wickets	7
Bowling average	37.57
5 wickets in innings	0
10 wickets in match	0
Best bowling	2/20
Catches/stumpings	9/–
- Source: ESPNcricinfo, 20 July 2013

Arthur Blackman (13 October 1853 – 6 April 1908) was an English amateur cricketer active in the 1870s and 1880s. A right-handed batsman and right-arm roundarm medium pace bowler, Blackman made twenty appearances in first-class cricket, playing for three counties.

== Cricket career ==
Born at Dartford in Kent, Blackman made his first-class cricket debut for Surrey against Nottinghamshire at Trent Bridge in 1878, in what was his only first-class appearance for that county. The following season he began playing for Kent, making his debut for the county against Sussex. He made two more appearances for the county, one in 1879 and one in 1880, as well as playing for the Gentlemen of Kent against the Gentlemen of England.

Blackman began playing for Sussex in 1881, making his debut for the county against Nottinghamshire at Hove. He played sporadically for the county until 1887, with 15 of his first-class matches coming for the county. He was also described in his Wisden obituary as "a good field at cover-point, and a useful medium-paced bowler".

== Later life ==
Outside of cricket, Blackman was a teacher, living in Sussex from 1881 with his wife Sarah. He was related to Kent bowler Fred Martin whom he recommended to the county. He died at Preston in Sussex in 1908 aged 54.

== Bibliography ==
- Carlaw, Derek (2020). Kent County Cricketers, A to Z: Part One (1806–1914) (PDF). Cardiff: ACS.
