= Charles Marriott =

English cricketer

Personal information
- Full name: Charles Stowell Marriott
- Born: 14 September 1895; Heaton Moor, Stockport, England
- Died: 13 October 1966 (aged 71); Dollis Hill, London, England
- Nickname: Father
- Batting: Right-handed
- Bowling: Right arm leg break

International information
- National side: England
- Only Test (cap 270): 12 August 1933 v West Indies

Domestic team information
- Years: Team
- 1919–1921: Lancashire
- 1920–1921: Cambridge University
- 1924–1937: Kent

Career statistics
Competition	Test	First-class
Matches	1	159
Runs scored	0	574
Batting average	0.00	4.41
100s/50s	0/0	0/0
Top score	0	21
Balls bowled	247	37,176
Wickets	11	711
Bowling average	8.72	20.11
5 wickets in innings	2	48
10 wickets in match	1	10
Best bowling	6/59	8/98
Catches/stumpings	1/–	47/–
- Source: CricInfo, 30 October 2009

Charles Stowell "Father" Marriott (14 September 1895 – 13 October 1966) was an English cricketer, who played first-class cricket for Lancashire, Cambridge University and Kent. Marriott played between 1919 and 1938 and was considered one of the best leg-break and googly bowlers of the time. He went on to teach, having served during World War I in the British Army.

Marriott played in one Test match for the England cricket team in 1933 at the age of 37, taking 11 wickets.

== Early life ==
Marriott was born at Heaton Moor near Stockport in Lancashire; his birth was registered as "Charlie Stowell Marriott". His father, Joshua Marriott, was a solicitor. He was educated in Ireland, first at Monkston Park School in Dublin from 1904 to 1909 and then at The Royal School, Armagh between 1909 and 1912 before attending St Columba's College, Dublin from 1912 to 1913. He played cricket in the school XI at both Royal School and St Columba's and was a member of the St Columba's Officer Training Corps (OTC).

After leaving school Marriott enrolled at Trinity College Dublin where he was also a member of the OTC. His studies were interrupted by the outbreak of World War I.

== Military service ==
Marriott enrolled in the Lancashire Fusiliers in September 1915 and was commissioned as a temporary Second Lieutenant in the 21st Reserve Battalion the following month. In March 1916 he was posted to France with the 16th Battalion and he was on the front line at Thiepval when the Battle of the Somme began and saw action during the first two days of the battle. He spent time on the front line at Ovillers and, later in the year, to the north of Arras and was promoted, first to Lieutenant and then to acting Captain, commanding a company.

He was injured falling on frozen duckboards during early 1917 and spent some time convalescing in England before returning to the war, seeing action at Savy Wood, Saint-Quentin, Nieuwpoort and around Ypres during the summer. He was gassed near Nieuwpoort in July 1917 and evacuated home, spending time recovering in Dublin. Doctors determined that he was suffering from photophobia and had many of the classic signs of shell shock and that he was unfit for front line service. He spent early 1918 with the 3rd Battalion at Withernsea in Yorkshire and transferred to the Royal Air Force in July, joining the Cadet Wing at Hastings with the rank of Lieutenant for the remainder of the war. He was demobilised in April 1919.

== Cricket career ==
Having played some cricket during the war, including for a team organised by FS Jackson at Lord's in 1918, Marriott made his first-class cricket debut for the Gentlemen of England against Oxford University in May 1919. He went on to make his Lancashire debut later the same month. The match, against Essex at Leyton, is reported to be the first county cricket match Marriott had ever seen. He played 12 matches for Lancashire from 1919 to 1921.

Marriott enrolled at Peterhouse, Cambridge in 1919. He played for Cambridge University Cricket Club, making 17 first-class appearances for the team in his two years at Cambridge. (Note: Marriott took a shortened degree. This was standard practice at Cambridge immediately after World War I, with men who had served during the war being allowed to graduate more quickly. Marriott was credited with three terms worth of study for his war service.) He won blues in 1920 and 1921, meeting with "remarkable success", taking seven wickets in both of his University Matches. It was at Cambridge that Marriott was nicknamed "Father" on account of his relatively advanced age of 25.

After Cambridge, Marriott went on to take up a post as a teacher of modern languages at Dulwich College in 1921. He took responsibility for cricket at the school between 1921 and 1926. The post allowed him to play for Kent County Cricket Club in the school holidays, although he initially declined Lord Harris' invitation to do so. He eventually accepted the opportunity and played for the Kent team between 1924 and 1937, making 101 first-class appearances for the county, taking 429 wickets.

In his first season for Kent Marriott topped the county's bowling averages and was awarded his county cap. He took 10 wickets against Hampshire and 11 against Lancashire and had a "remarkable impact" on the team. He toured South Africa over the English winter of 1924/25 with SB Joel's XI, (Note: The tour was not recognised as one by an England team with an official tour of Australia organised by MCC taking place at the same time.) playing in eight of the 14 first-class matches during the tour and played regularly for Kent during August in each season until 1935, other than in 1930 when he played no first-class cricket. His last match for Kent came in 1937 against Sussex at Maidstone, and his final first-class match was the following year for Free Foresters against Oxford University.

=== International cricket ===
Completed Test career bowling averages (Note: Qualification: 10 wickets, career completed.)
Bowler	Average
Charles Marriott (ENG)	8.72
Frederick Martin (ENG)	10.07
George Lohmann (ENG)	10.75
Laurie Nash (AUS)	12.60
John Ferris (AUS/ENG)	12.70
Tom Horan (AUS)	13.00
Harry Dean (ENG)	13.90
Albert Trott (AUS/ENG)	15.00
Mike Procter (SA)	15.02
Jack Iverson (AUS)	15.23
Tom Kendall (AUS)	15.35
Alec Hurwood (AUS)	15.45
Billy Barnes (ENG)	15.54
John Trim (WI)	16.16
Billy Bates (ENG)	16.42

Marriott was selected in the squad for the 4th Ashes Test at Old Trafford in 1921, but didn't make the final eleven. Marriott's only Test match was in the third Test against the touring West Indies at The Oval in 1933. He was aged 37 when he was called in to the England team as a replacement for the injured Hedley Verity. He took 11 wickets during the match, 5/37 in the West Indies first innings, and 6/59 (Note: The notation 6/59 means that the bowler took six wickets at the cost of 59 runs scored by the opposing team from his bowling.) in the second, making him the fourth cricketer to take two five wicket hauls on Test debut. Wisden reported that with "clever flighting of the ball, perfect length and spin" he produced "one of the best performances accomplished by a bowler when playing for England for the first time" and Marriott remains the bowler with the lowest bowling average to have taken more than 10 wickets in Test matches. He "bewildered" the West Indian batsmen as he "disguised his spin very well and never made the ball break too much".

The following winter Marriott toured India with an official England team led by Douglas Jardine. He did not play in any of the three Test matches on the tour and Wisden reported that he "was seldom as good as in England", although he took a hat-trick against Madras, the only time he completed the hat-trick during his career. He played nine times for MCC during the tour, taking 32 wickets, and made a further appearance for the club against the touring Australians in May 1934.

== Playing style and legacy ==
Marriott was one of the best leg break bowlers of the 1920s and 1930s. He bowled with a high bowling action, swinging his arm behind his back before he delivered the ball in a style which Wisden compared to Kent's great spin bowler Colin Blythe. He bowled an "immaculate length" at slow or medium pace and was "highly disciplined" in his approach to bowling, having developed his skills through what The Times called "endless practice". He used "cunning flighting" and "the ability to turn the ball sharply" to be an effective bowler "even on good pitches" and could be "unplayable" on helpful pitches. He bowled a "fierce" top-spinner and although he was able to bowl an effective googly, he used it relatively rarely, having injured himself at school whilst bowling the delivery. If he did bowl the delivery it was generally during the first few overs of a spell to act as a deterrent to batsmen.

Marriott wrote a book, The Complete Leg-Break Bowler, which was posthumously published in 1968 with an introduction by Ian Peebles and a postscript by Richie Benaud. John Arlott praised its "feeling for subject, polished style, and a salting of humour" and declared that it was "one of the classics of cricket writing".

The 11 wickets Marriott took in his only Test match remain the best bowling figures for any player who has only played a single Test. He is the only player to have taken two five wicket hauls in their only Test and his Test bowling average of 8.72 runs per wicket is the lowest of any Test cricketer to have taken 10 or more wickets.

Marriott took a total of 711 wickets during his first-class career, 429 of them taken for Kent. He took 10 wickets in a match 10 times, eight for Kent, and five wickets in an innings 48 times. He was a less than capable fielder and batsman and scored fewer runs, 574, than he took wickets. As a coach at Dulwich College he coached a number of future first-class players, including future Wisden Cricketers of the Year Trevor Bailey and Hugh Bartlett.

== Personal and later life ==
Marriott married Phyllis Taylor at Kensington in 1924 and taught at Dulwich College throughout his career. He retired from teaching in 1953, three years early due to ill health. As a teacher he was "well known" for a passion for literature, playing roles in school plays and he played the trombone in the school orchestra. After his retirement he gave readings from literature at schools and literary societies.

During World War II Marriott was an anti-aircraft gunner in the Home Guard and played cricket in war-time matches, including at Lord's in 1944 when he was 47. He died in a nursing home at Dollis Hill in Middlesex in 1966 aged 71.

== See also ==
- One-Test wonder
- List of England cricketers who have taken five-wicket hauls on Test debut
