= Ben Sealey =

West Indian cricketer

Personal information
- Full name: Benjamin James Sealey
- Born: 12 August 1899; St Joseph, Trinidad
- Died: 12 September 1963 (aged 64); Port of Spain, Trinidad
- Batting: Right-handed
- Bowling: Right-arm medium

International information
- National side: West Indies
- Only Test (cap 36): 12 August 1933 v England

Domestic team information
- Years: Team
- 1923-24 to 1940-41: Trinidad

Career statistics
Competition	Test	First-class
Matches	1	51
Runs scored	41	2,115
Batting average	20.50	29.37
100s/50s	0/0	4/9
Top score	29	116
Balls bowled	30	5,168
Wickets	1	78
Bowling average	10.00	25.97
5 wickets in innings	0	2
10 wickets in match	0	0
Best bowling	1/10	5/22
Catches/stumpings	0/–	22/0
- Source: Cricinfo, 4 October 2019

Benjamin James Sealey or Sealy (12 August 1899 – 12 September 1963) was a West Indian cricketer whose career spanned the years 1924 to 1941. He was an attacking, middle-order batsman, a medium-pace, leg-break bowler and an athletic fielder anywhere in the field. Despite once turning out for a "Barbados-born" side against the Rest of West Indies, Sealey was a Trinidad player through and through.

== Biography ==
Ben Sealey was born in Trinidad, at St. Joseph. He was into his mid-twenties by the time his first-class career started but in 1933 he was selected to tour England with a West Indian team captained by Jackie Grant. His tour was both busy, in terms of matches played, and reasonably successful with both bat and ball. From 22 first-class matches – he also played in 12 minor matches – Sealey scored 1,072 runs at an average of 39.70 and took 19 wickets at 38.15 apiece. He was picked to play in the third and final Test of the series, the only Test of his career, and was West Indies' top scorer in the first innings, hitting 29 from a total of 100. He scored 12 runs in the second innings and took one wicket, that of Fred Bakewell, for 10 runs in England's only innings. His scored three centuries on the tour: 103 against Worcestershire at Worcester, 105 not out against Glamorgan at Swansea and 106 not out against the Army at Aldershot.

The highest score of his first-class career came at Bridgetown in January 1939 when he hit 116 against the hosts, Barbados, to help Trinidad to a victory by an innings and 19 runs. He twice took five wickets in an innings: five for 22 at Bridgetown for Trinidad against Barbados in January 1932 and five for 26 at Port-of-Spain for Trinidad against the touring Marylebone Cricket Club in January 1935.

Sealey's death on 12 September 1963 in Port-of-Spain, Trinidad, aged 64, went unreported in cricket circles and no obituary of him appeared in Wisden.

== Sources ==
1. World Cricketers - A Biographical Dictionary by Christopher Martin-Jenkins, published by Oxford University Press (1996).
2. The Wisden Book of Test Cricket, Volume 1 (1877–1977), compiled and edited by Bill Frindall, Headline Book Publishing (1995).
3. The Complete Record of West Indian Test Cricketers by Bridgette Lawrence & Ray Goble, ACL & Polar Publishing (UK) Ltd. (1991).
