= Frederick Martin (cricketer) =

English cricketer (1861–1921)

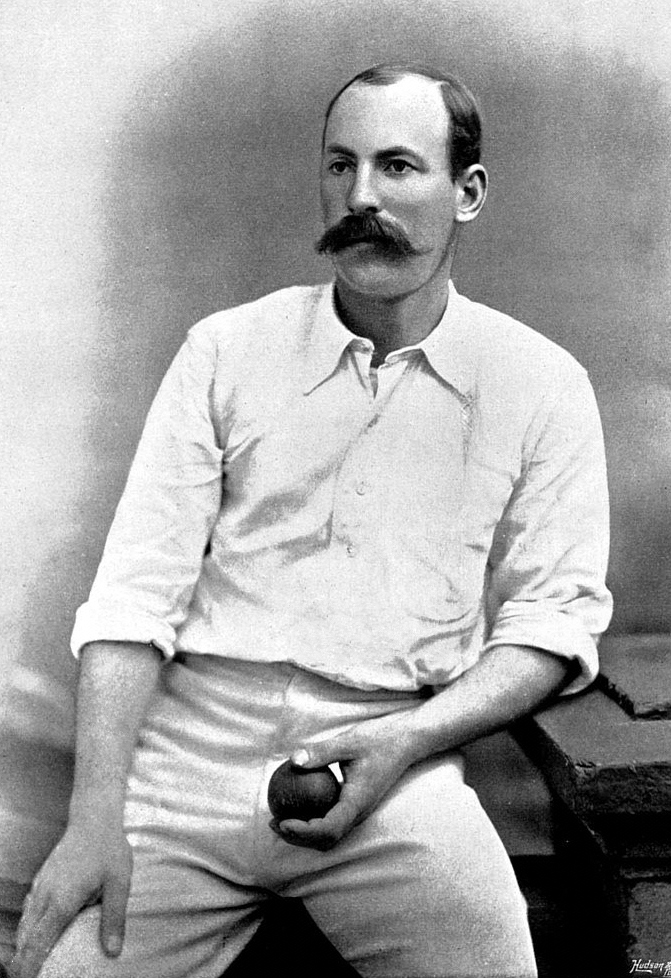
- Martin in around 1895

Personal information
- Full name: Frederick Martin
- Born: 12 October 1861; Dartford, Kent
- Died: 13 December 1921 (aged 60); Dartford, Kent
- Nickname: Nutty
- Batting: Left-handed
- Bowling: Left-arm medium

International information
- National side: England
- Test debut (cap 70): 11 August 1890 v Australia
- Last Test: 22 March 1892 v South Africa

Domestic team information
- Years: Team
- 1885–1899: Kent
- 1886–1900: MCC

Career statistics
Competition	Test	First-class
Matches	2	317
Runs scored	14	4,545
Batting average	7.00	12.15
100s/50s	0/0	0/8
Top score	13	90
Balls bowled	410	67,794
Wickets	14	1,317
Bowling average	10.07	17.38
5 wickets in innings	2	95
10 wickets in match	1	23
Best bowling	6/50	8/45
Catches/stumpings	2/–	120/–
- Source: CricInfo, 29 December 2008

Frederick Martin (12 October 1861 – 13 December 1921), also known as Fred Martin and Nutty Martin, was an English professional cricketer who bowled left-arm medium-pace spin. Martin played first-class cricket between 1885 and 1892, primarily for Kent County Cricket Club, and appeared twice in Test matches for the England cricket team. He was considered one of the best left-arm spin bowlers in the country between 1889 and 1891.

Martin was named as one of the Wisden Cricketers of the Year in the 1892 edition of the Wisden Cricketers' Almanack. He took six wickets in both innings of his Test debut in 1890, the first time any player had taken two five wicket hauls in his debut Test match. His 12 wickets for 102 runs in the match were the best match figures for a debutant in Test cricket at the time and remained so until 1972. They remain the best match figures for an England player on debut. He took 100 first-class wickets in a season six times and took four wickets in four balls playing for MCC in 1895.

== Early life ==
Martin was born at Dartford in Kent in 1861 to William and Ann Martin. His father and grandfathers worked in the ironworking industry. He was one of eight children and as a boy played cricket on Dartford Brent, an area of common land close to the town, and went on to play club cricket in the local area.

By 1882, Martin's ability started to be noticed and a relative, Arthur Blackman, (Note: Blackman was described as Martin's half-brother in his Wisden obituary and as his uncle in an article by the Kent Cricket Heritage Trust.) recommended him to Herbert Knatchbull-Hugessen, a member of the Kent County Cricket Club committee. He played in three trial matches for Kent Colts in May 1882 but did not progress to the county team until he joined St Lawrence Cricket Club at Canterbury in 1884. The pace of Martin's bowling varied in his early years, from fast to slow before he settled on a medium pace delivery by the time he joined Kent.

== Cricket career ==
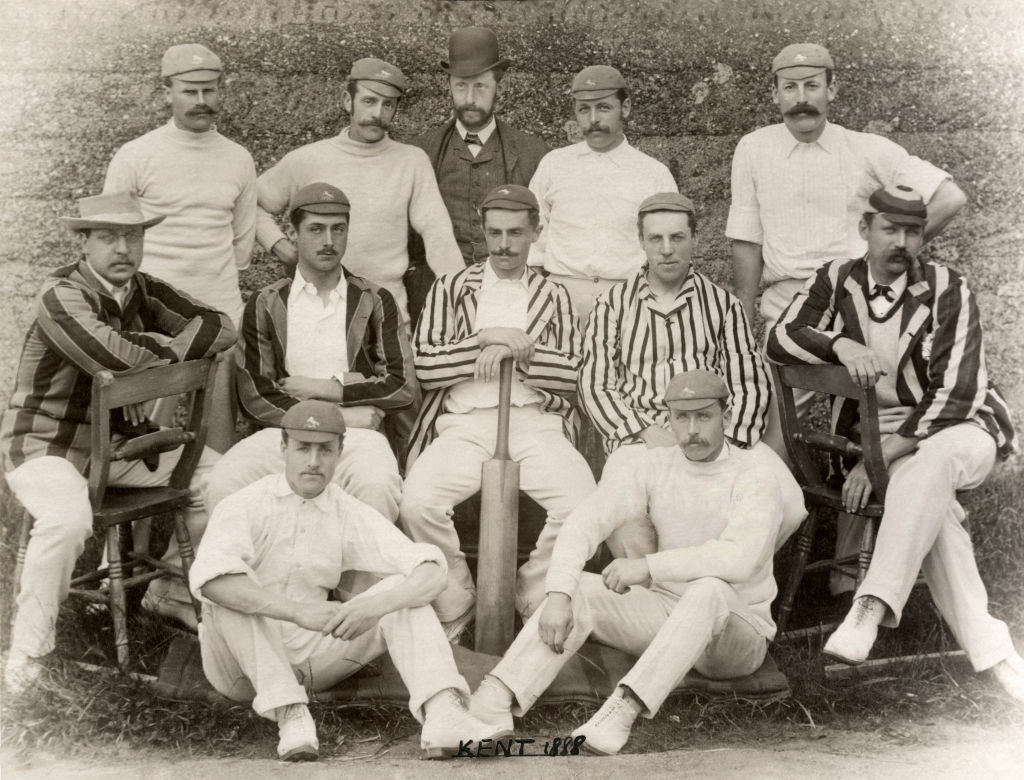
The Kent team in 1888. Martin is standing in the back row on the right.

After taking over 100 wickets for St Lawrence in 1884, Martin made his first-class debut for Kent in July 1885, playing against Sussex at Gravesend, although he only bowled one over during the match and did not take a wicket. He did not play again for the county team until the following season, although once again he took over 100 wickets in club cricket during the season. After taking only three wickets in his first three matches in 1886, Martin was recalled to the team during August against Surrey at The Oval and took 12 wickets in the match. He followed this with 7 wickets against Lancashire and 8 against Nottinghamshire, ending the season with 29 wickets and leading the Kent bowling averages. He also made his first appearance for MCC during the season.

Martin played regularly after 1886 and, although he was considered "disappointing" in 1887, in a year in which Kent were poor, he established himself as a "top-class" bowler, taking 60 wickets for the county in 1888, the season he was first paired with Walter Wright. Martin and Wright bowled together between 1888 and 1891, delivering two-thirds of the overs Kent bowled during that period. They bowled unchanged for the county in three complete matches and in 10 innings and formed the basis for Kent's bowling attack in the early years of the County Championship.

Between 1889 and 1891, Martin was considered in his prime and one of the best left-arm bowlers in the country. He took 87 wickets for Kent in 1889 and 106 in total, the first time he had taken over 100 wickets in a season. He followed this with 190 wickets in 1890, with 105 for Kent including a hat-trick against Surrey at The Oval, and 140 in 1891, again taking 105 for Kent. (Note: Martin's Wisden obituary and Moore's History of Kent County Cricket Club both credit Martin with 116 wickets for Kent in 1890 and his obituary notes 112 in 1891; George Marsham, writing in Wisden in 1907, notes 116 in 1890 and 112 in 1891. Modern Kent County Cricket Club statistics credit 105 wickets each season and scorecards show that he took 11 wickets for the county against Warwickshire in a non-first-class match in 1890 and seven in two matches against the same county, which did not yet have first-class cricket status, in 1891. His Cricketer of the Year citation in Wisden in 1892 notes less than 100 each season.) He played his only home Test match for England in 1890 and was named as one of the Wisden Cricketers of the Year in the 1892 edition of the almanack.

After 1891, Martin's performances were generally considered to have declined, with the spin or movement he achieved with the ball thought to have reduced significantly. He toured South Africa in 1891/92 with a team led by Walter Reed and played in the one match on the tour which was retrospectively given Test match status. Wisden considered that the heavy workload of the tour diminished Martin's performances in the 1892 English season, but he took over 100 wickets in each season between 1894 and 1896, with 1894 considered a "very good season" during which he bowled "with astonishing success on soft wickets for the MCC at Lord's in May", and Martin was still considered an accurate bowler with good control of length. He took four wickets in four balls for MCC against Derbyshire in 1895 and remained economical throughout his career – his 73 wickets for Kent in 1898 were taken at an average of 18.98 runs per wicket, leading Kent's averages that season.

In 1899, Martin played in all of Kent's matches until the end of July. Wisden reported that he was "incapacitated for part of the season" and he only bowled four overs in his final match for the county, missing his benefit match later the same summer. After three first-class matches for MCC in 1900, he played no further first-class cricket, although he did play twice for MCC in 1901 against Minor Counties and Norfolk in non-first-class matches and stood as an umpire in 50 first-class matches between 1902 and 1906. He coached young Kent professionals such as Colin Blythe during the off-season even after 1899, either at Canterbury or at the Tonbridge Nursery, Kent's young player development centre which was established toward the end of Martin's career.

As well as making 229 appearances for Kent, Martin played in 57 first-class matches for MCC and was a member of the ground staff at Lord's until 1908. He played 17 times for the South of England and five times for the Players in the Gentlemen v Players fixture.

== International cricket ==
Completed Test career bowling averages (Note: Qualification: 10 wickets, career completed.)
Bowler	Average
Charles Marriott (ENG)	8.72
Frederick Martin (ENG)	10.07
George Lohmann (ENG)	10.75
Laurie Nash (AUS)	12.60
John Ferris (AUS/ENG)	12.70
Tom Horan (AUS)	13.00
Harry Dean (ENG)	13.90
Albert Trott (AUS/ENG)	15.00
Mike Procter (SA)	15.02
Jack Iverson (AUS)	15.23
Tom Kendall (AUS)	15.35
Alec Hurwood (AUS)	15.45
Billy Barnes (ENG)	15.54
John Trim (WI)	16.16
Billy Bates (ENG)	16.42

Martin played in only two Test matches for England. He played at a time when England had a number of left-arm spin options, with Lancashire's Johnny Briggs and Yorkshire's Bobby Peel the first-choice bowlers for the national team. Martin's debut came in the second Test against Australia at The Oval in 1890 with Briggs injured and Yorkshire refusing to allow Peel to play. (Note: Yorkshire's refusal to allow Peel to play in the Test match came after Middlesex amateur Andrew Stoddart, one of the leading batsmen of the day, opted to play against Yorkshire in a County Championship match scheduled at the same time as the second Test. Lord Hawke, the dominant figure in Yorkshire cricket at the time, refused to allow either Peel or George Ulyett, both professionals who had no option other than to follow his orders, to play in the Test.) Martin had already played the Australian team in four matches during the tour, twice for Kent and once for both the MCC and the South of England and had already taken 32 Australian wickets.

Rain made conditions at The Oval perfect for Martin's bowling and he took 6/50 in the Australian first innings and 6/52 in their second. He was described by Wisden as having bowled "wonderfully well" in a "splendid performance" whilst The Times reported that "one of the chief features of the match was the success of Martin". His bowling performance was the first time a player on Test debut had taken two five wicket hauls in the same match and Martin's match figures of 12/102 remained the best bowling figures for a player on Test debut until 1972 when they were bettered by Bob Massie. The match was the first time an English bowler had taken six or more wickets in an innings on debut and Martin's match figures remain the best figures for any England debutant.

Rain washed out the third Test match in 1890 although Martin was not included in the team for the match with Briggs fit once again. He was invited to join the tour of South Africa led by Walter Reed in 1891/92. This was not considered a formal Test tour at the time and a second England tour to Australia took place at the same time, with many of the leading English players, including Briggs and Peel, on that tour. (Note: The tour to Australia was organised by Lord Sheffield and the team was captained by W.G. Grace, the leading player in the game at the time. The team was described by Wisden as "fully representative". An MCC team organised by Lord Hawke also toured North America during the 1891/92 English winter. Only five of the players on the South African tour had played a Test match prior to the tour.) All but one of the matches played in South Africa were non-first-class matches played against teams with more than 12 players. Martin took 109 wickets on the tour, although he was considered out-bowled by J. J. Ferris (Note: Ferris had played for Australia in Martin's Test debut in 1890 after which he moved to England.) and played in the only first-class match against a South African XI, taking two wickets in the South African second innings having not bowled in the first. The match was given retrospective Test match status after Martin's death.

In his two Test matches Martin took a total of 14 wickets at a bowling average of 10.07 runs per wicket. This is the second lowest bowling average of any Test cricketer in history who has taken at least 10 wickets.

== Playing style and legacy ==
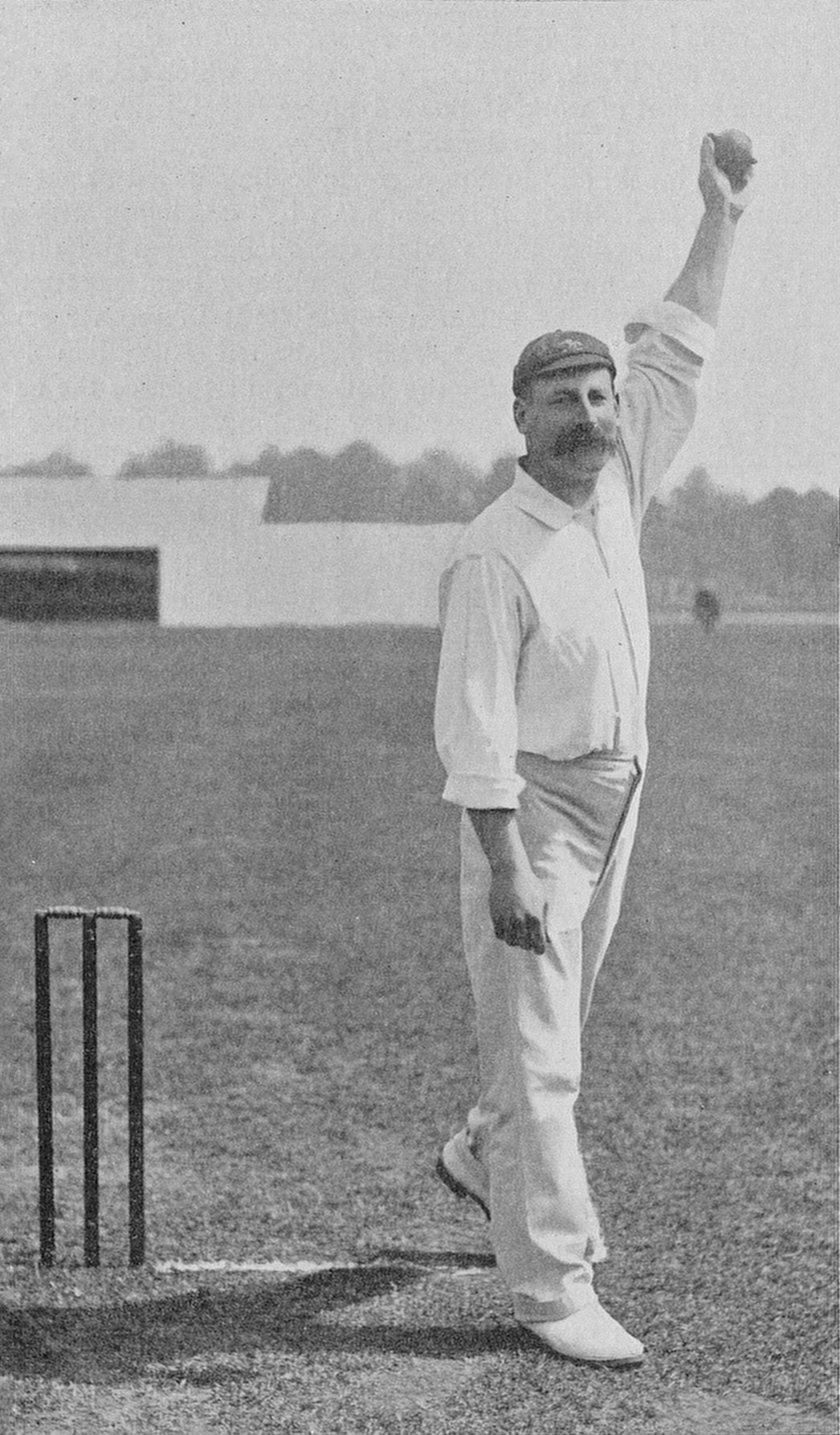
Martin demonstrating his bowling action in 1897

Martin was described as bowling left-arm medium pace with a "high and very easy delivery" which "seemed part of himself". The pace of his bowling was considered "rather over than under medium pace", although he is often described as a spin bowler. It is unclear exactly how Martin bowled and the term "spin" could be used to refer to any movement of the ball off the pitch during this era. In his Cricketer of the Year citation Wisden wrote that "when the ground helps him he breaks back in a way that baffles the strongest batsmen" and it is possible that he bowled cutters as well as more orthodox finger spin. Carlaw suggest that he may have been a bowler similar to Derek Underwood who played for Kent in the 20th century and spun the ball at a medium pace.

Although Martin appears to have lost some of the deviation he used after 1891, he retained his accuracy and ability to bowl a good length. Wisden had noted that "the extreme accuracy of his length makes him difficult to hit on even the best of wickets".

In total he took 1,317 first-class wickets in his career, 947 of them taken for Kent. This places him ninth on the list of Kent's all-time wicket-takers, with only Colin Blythe and Tich Freeman taking more wickets at a lower bowling average. He took 10 wickets in a match 23 times, 15 for Kent, and five wickets in an innings 95 times, 64 times for his county, whilst his match bowling figures on Test debut remain the best match figures for an England bowler on debut.

As a batsman Martin was generally rated quite poorly. His Wisden obituary says that he "was never much of a batsman", although he was a "prolific scorer in club cricket", a feature of his play that does not seem to have been taken seriously at county level. His highest score of 90 runs was made at Gravesend in 1897 and was one of eight half-centuries he made during his career.

== Personal life ==
Martin was nicknamed "Nutty". This appears to have referred to his style of dress and is probably a variant of natty – a term for someone who is well dressed and presented. In a team photograph from 1898 he wears "a broad brimmed hat, carries a smart cane and looks the personification of a Parisian boulevardier".

Martin married his wife Esther in 1888 at Bridge. He died at Dartford after suffering a cerebral haemorrhage in December 1921. He was aged 60.
