= Clifford Inniss =

Barbadian cricketer

Personal information
- Full name: Clifford de Lisle Inniss
- Born: 26 October 1910; Friendly Hall, St Michael, Barbados
- Died: 21 December 1998 (aged 88); Belmopan, Belize
- Batting: Right-handed
- Bowling: Right-arm slow

Domestic team information
- Years: Team
- 1927-28 to 1938-39: Barbados

Career statistics
Competition	First-class
Matches	10
Runs scored	474
Batting average	27.88
100s/50s	0/4
Top score	80
Balls bowled	60
Wickets	1
Bowling average	50.00
5 wickets in innings	0
10 wickets in match	0
Best bowling	1/17
Catches/stumpings	4/–
- Source: Cricinfo, 2 February 2018

Sir Clifford de Lisle Inniss (26 October 1910 – 21 December 1998) was a Barbadian cricketer and lawyer.

Inniss was born at Friendly Hall, Saint Michael, Barbados, and attended Harrison College in Bridgetown. He was a right-handed batsman who played a few matches of first-class cricket for Barbados from 1927–28 to 1938–39. His highest scores were the 72 and 80 he made against British Guiana in 1929–30. While studying law at Oxford University in 1933 he joined the West Indian touring team for their first-class matches early in the tour against Oxford University in Oxford and against MCC at Lord's. He and George Headley put on 149 for the third wicket against MCC.

Inniss became a QC, and later served as Chief Justice of British Honduras. He died in Belmopan, the capital of Belize, aged 88. His brother, Bruce de Lisle Inniss, played one first-class match for Barbados in 1942.
