= Naparima College =

Location
- Lute Drive; Paradise Pasture; San Fernando, 600301; Trinidad and Tobago; 10.275228°N 61.469117°W

Information
- Type: Secondary school
- Motto: A Posse Ad Esse (Latin) (Literal: From possibility to actuality)
- Religious affiliation: Presbyterian
- Established: 2 February 1894
- Founder: Dr. Kenneth J. Grant
- School board: Presbyterian Secondary School Board
- School district: Victoria West
- School code: 160034
- Principal: Mr. Roger Ali
- Forms: 7
- Gender: Male
- Age range: 12-18
- Enrollment: 900+ (2019)
- Hours in school day: 6.5
- Classrooms: 28
- Colors: Oxford Blue and White
- Yearbook: Olympian
- Alumni: Naparima College Association of Past Students ('NAPS')
- Website: http://naparimacollege.org

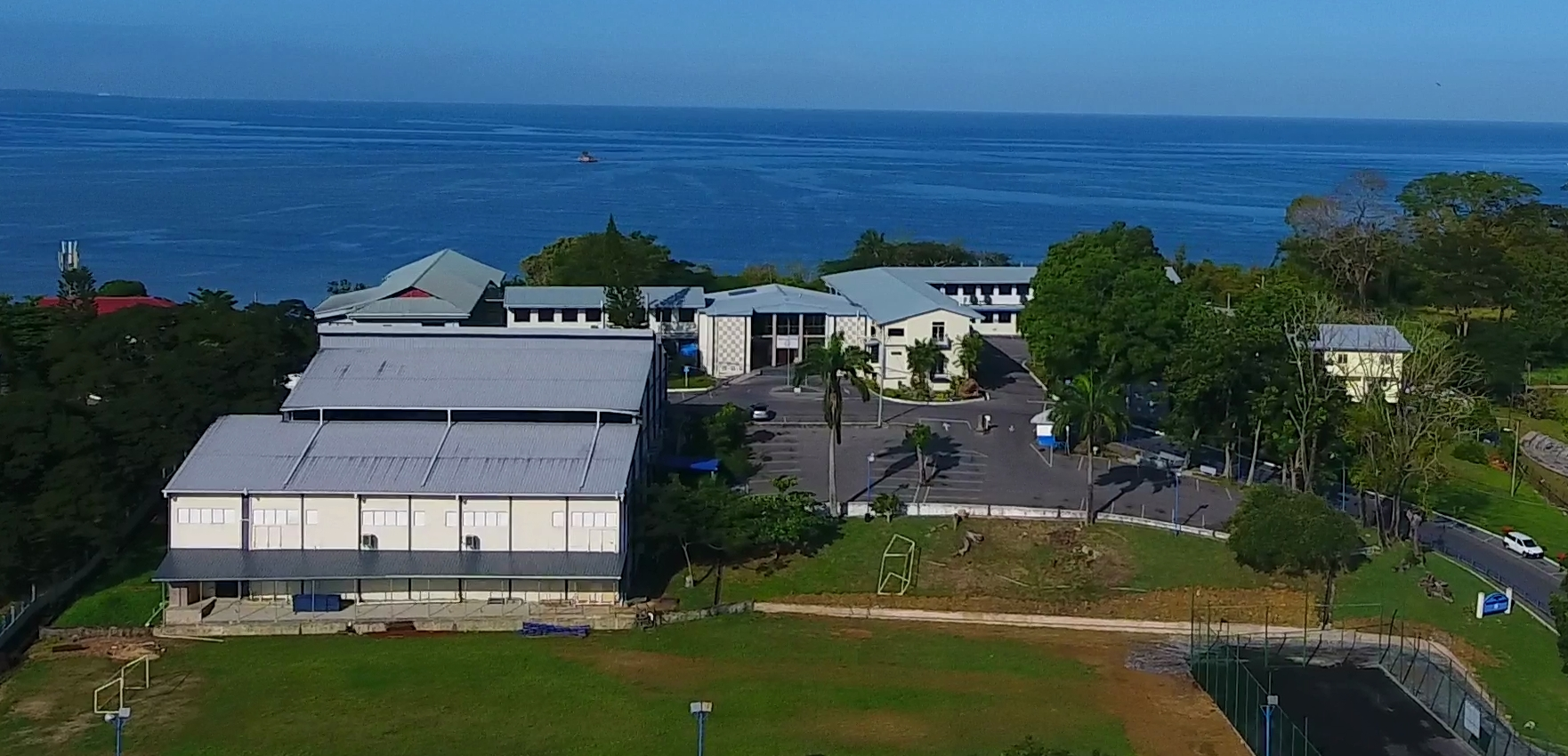
Aerial view of the Campus

Naparima College (informally known as Naparima Boys) is a public secondary school for boys in Trinidad and Tobago. Located in San Fernando, the school was founded in 1894 but received official recognition in 1900. It was established by Dr. Kenneth J. Grant, a Canadian Presbyterian missionary working among the Indian population in Trinidad. The school was one of the first to educate Indo-Trinidadians and played an important and crucial role in the development of an Indo-Trinidadian and Tobagonian professional class. Naparima is derived from the Arawak word (A) naparima, meaning ‘large water’, or from Nabarima, Warao, for ‘Father of the waves.’

The school was founded in the churchyard of Susamachar Presbyterian Church in San Fernando as the Canadian Mission Indian School. In 1899, the Mission Council petitioned the Board of Queen's Royal College in Port of Spain for affiliation with it. In 1900, the school became a recognised secondary school and was thus eligible for state aid. It was then renamed Naparima College. In 1917 it relocated to its present campus at Paradise Hill on what was then the southern edge of the city.

== Administration ==
=== Principals ===
The following is a chronological list of principals who have served at Naparima College.

Principal	Year
Kenneth J. Grant	1894–1900
Alison Cumming	1900–1903
F. J. Coffin	1904–1909
J. A. Scrimgeour	1909–1912
H. F. Kemp	1913–1915
J. C. MacDonald	1915–1917
W. A. Hunter	1917–1923
H. Dyment	1923–1924
Victor B. Walls	1924–1953
Edward T. Lute	1953–1961
James F. Sieunarine	1962–1966
Allan I. MacKenzie	1966–1995
Edison J. Sookoo	1996–2002
Maureen Atwal	2002–2005
Michael R. Dowlath	2006–2020
Roger Ali	2020–present

== Campus ==
Naparima College's campus sits atop Paradise Hill, overlooking the city of San Fernando in southern Trinidad. The city's major landmark, the San Fernando Hill, towers over the college to the east; to the west is the Gulf of Paria. While the campus location has been the same for decades, there have been numerous infrastructural and developmental changes over the years. Many of the major changes had arisen out of the demolition of the old wooden buildings, most of which had been around since the first half of the 20th century. Most notably, the college's old gymnasium which was demolished in 1995, the Grant Memorial Building in 1999, and the structure referred to as the "main building" in 2005.

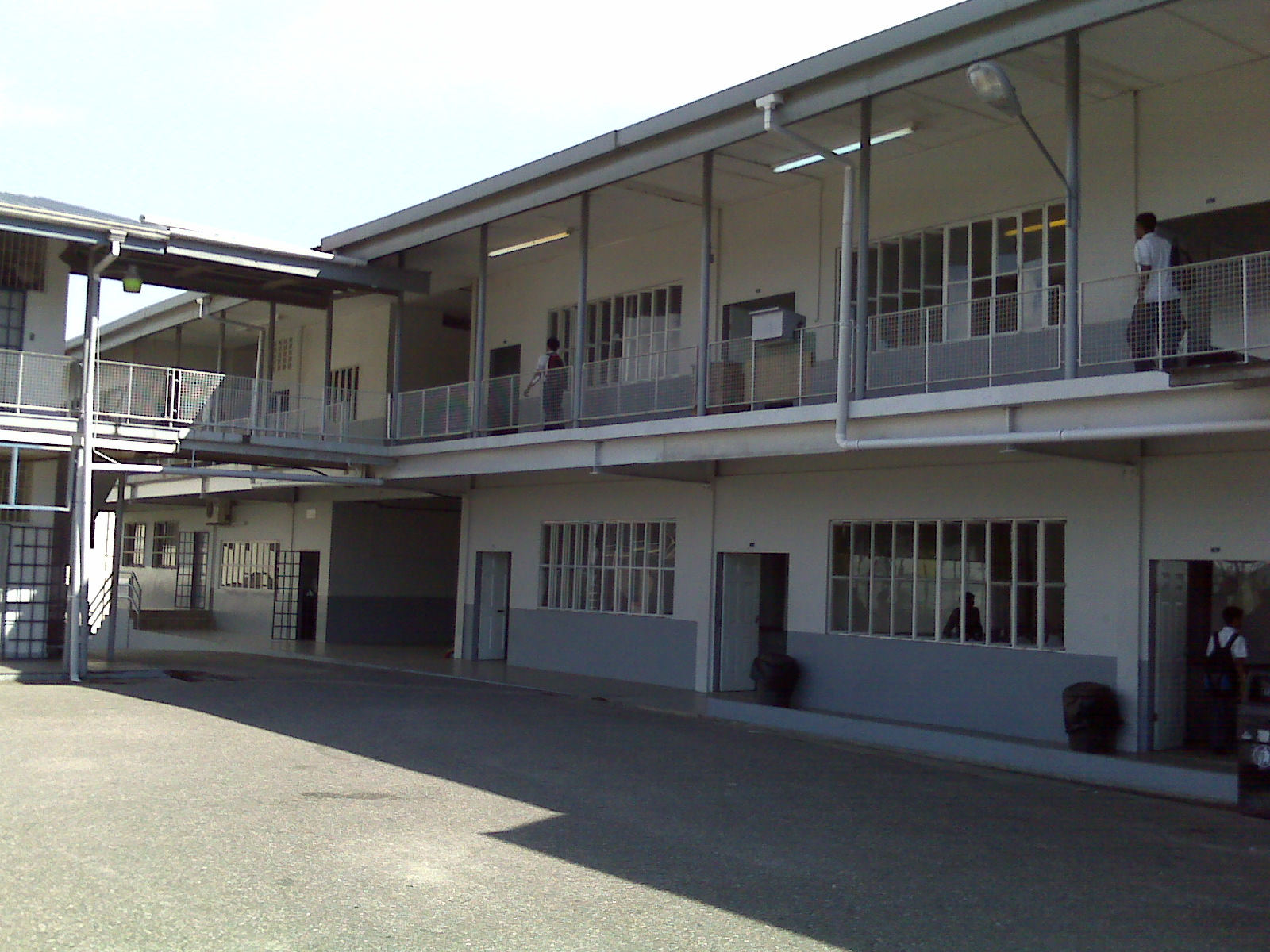
The Grant's Memorial Wing as seen from the courtyard

The structure that replaced the Grant Memorial Building is referred to as the "Grant's Memorial Wing" or the "new Grant building". Almost twice as large as the old building, it consists of two levels and a basement area (at the western end). It possesses a number of classrooms, Conference, Geography, Business, Language, Art, and Science Demonstration Rooms as well as an "Intelligent Classroom" and Scout Den.

Directly adjacent to the Grant's Memorial Wing and connected via a pedestrian bridge is the Science laboratory building. Consisting of two levels, it contains a Chemistry laboratory on the first floor and Biology and Physics laboratories on the second floor.

Neighboring the laboratory building and connected by corridors on the second floor is another section which houses the library. Having undergone various remodeling sessions in the past few years, its design as of 2012 is the most effective for research and study purposes. The availability of its service characteristics means that the library can be considered to be a hybrid of both a reference and a lending library, albeit at a smaller scale for the institution. It has its own library staff, archives, Internet access as well as book rental and (magnetic card based) photocopying services.

Also in the same section, directly beneath the library on the first floor and accessed via corridors, is the Audio/Visual Room (abbreviated as the A/V Room), which is used for displaying media to aid lectures and presentations to an audience, especially by a visiting party. Also located in this section of the building are the offices of the deans of discipline and the dean of studies.

Adjacent to the aforementioned section of the school, but directly joined to it, is an L-shaped building that contains a number or classrooms, an Information Technology Laboratory, storage room (neighboring the cafeteria), Staff Room (for the teaching administration) and the offices of the Principal and Vice-Principal and the Main Office.

The washroom and shower facilities available for the student population and visitors alike are located on the western end of the campus, next to what is the Form 1 and 2 Blocks. These facilities are also located on the first floor of the gymnasium.

The cafeteria (known as The Café) is located on the northernmost sector of the campus. It has been extensively remodeled in the last few years, with its current design covering the largest area since Naparima College was founded.

The main section of the cafeteria, located just under what is now the Form 1S classroom of the Form 1 block, is the main area of business where students and members of the administration can trade. Adjacent to this is the area dubbed the Café Verandah. This area includes seating with tables. Local food merchants are also allowed to market there with permission from the administration. Students may purchase before and after regular school hours and during the luncheon and recess periods. The cafeteria staff reserves the right to bar any student from trading during class hours unless that student is accompanied with a written note provided by a member of the teaching or office administration.

The structure known as the Principal's Residence is located a stone's throw away from the main structure and is out-of-bounds to the student population. It had been an old building which went unused for years until its reconstruction was proposed and eventually completed alongside the gymnasium.

Towards the eastern sector lies the gymnasium which is the most recent addition to the campus (along with the Principal's Residence). Whilst overlooking the on-campus playing field, it consists of three levels, the second and third of which serve a dual purpose of hosting indoor sporting events as well as an Auditorium. The first level, which may also be considered as a basement level, facilitates indoor sporting activities, physical training via the use of exercise equipment, as well as bathroom and shower facilities.

There are a number of outdoor facilities normally available for the purposes of recreational and leisure ventures and are scattered in and around the campus.

The college has two outdoor recreational grounds. The main on-campus general playing field is located at the westernmost sector of the school's compound, and is available for use by the student population at any time before and after regular class hours. However, most activity occurs during both the recess and luncheon periods. It may also be utilized by students for the purposes of scheduled Physical Education lessons. The field also possess its own batting cage for the purposes of cricket practice.

The second and perhaps major playing field is located on the Lewis Street extension, San Fernando and being off campus it is generally out-of-bounds to the student population. It is mainly utilized for larger sporting events such as inter-school sporting competitions or for the events of Sports Day.

The spectator stand on the off-campus playing field which is known as the V.B. Walls Pavilion was constructed by the Naparima College Old Boys Association in 1965. Its name is a dedication to Rev. Dr. Victor B. Walls, a Naparima College principal from 1924 to 1953. It is scheduled for reconstruction.

The courtyard or "quadrangle" is located in what may be considered as the heart of the campus and is bounded by the structure housing the form 4 and 5 blocks to the north, the science laboratory building to the east and Grant's Memorial Wing to the south whilst looking over the Gulf of Paria to the west. Within the past few years, the area which was dedicated to the courtyard had dramatically increased. The old wooden structure commonly known as the main building and the structure known as the water bay were situated here but were both demolished in 2005. The courtyard is used by Naparima College as the student assembly grounds and for recreational activity.

Other miscellaneous facilities or features around the campus include:

- A terrace above the scout den, overlooking the Gulf of Paria on the western sector
- Park benches at strategic locations
- Sinks located near Grant's Memorial Wing and the Form 1 Block
- A pedestrian shelter located at the entrance to Paradise Hill
- Vehicular parking for administrative staff, visitors and form 6 students

== Form levels ==
=== Forms 1 – 5 levels ===
Each form level from 1 to 5 is usually sub-divided into four Form Classes. Each class in a form level is given the number of the form level and distinguished from each other by one of four letters – 'N', 'A', 'P' and 'S' (Naps - an abbreviation of 'Naparima College' used in general references). For instance, at the first form level the classes are Form 1N, 1A, 1P and 1S; with the pattern continuing up each successive form level. Normally each form class contained the same group of students that began together in the first form level, i.e. for example the same students who reside in Form 1N would be promoted to Form 2N. This trend continued until the Fourth Form level where students were separated and grouped into classes based on their choice of CSEC subjects. However, in order to expose students to a greater number of individuals, this trend was changed whereby when progressing up each successive form level at the start of a new academic year, the students groups within each form level are changed that is, students do not progress the form levels with the same group they had started out with in the first form level.

The form classes:

- Form 1 – 1N, 1A, 1P & 1S
- Form 2 – 2N, 2A, 2P & 2S
- Form 3 – 3N, 3A, 3P & 3S
- Form 4 – 4N, 4A, 4P & 4S
- Form 5 – 5N, 5A, 5P & 5S

=== Form 6 level ===
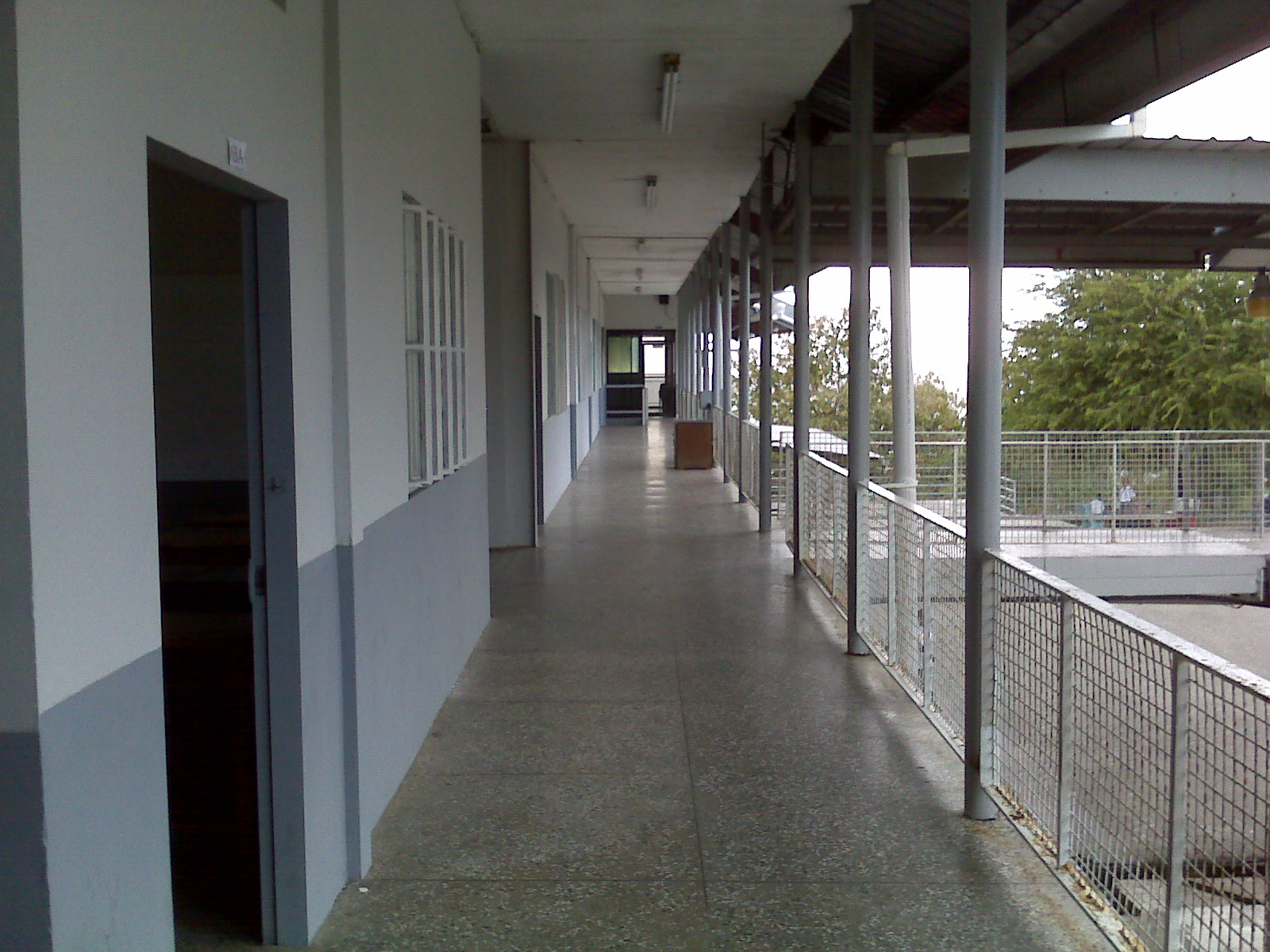
Form 6 Block, 2nd floor, Grant's Memorial Wing

The form 6 level is usually treated as a separate branch of classes and as such does not conform to the usual class-naming scheme as described above, instead having a unique scheme for both the Upper and Lower 6 classes. The Lower 6 Level is regarded as the level consisting of the younger form 6 students in their first year of CAPE study while the Upper 6 Level is regarded as the older students who are in their second and final year of CAPE study.

Naparima College tends to accept on average, eight external students into the Lower 6th Form Level per year. Usually these students only spend two years at the institution itself.

The Upper 6 students are acknowledged as being in their final year at Naparima College, after having spent seven years (external students spend fewer years) at the institution.

The form classes:

Lower 6 Level:

- 6BA
- 6BS1
- 6BS2
- 6BS3

Upper 6 Level:

- 6A
- 6AS1
- 6AS2
- 6AS3

The promotion scheme is the same with students being allowed the opportunity of promotion into the appropriate class as shown below.

Class Promotion at the Form 6 Level
Lower 6	Upper 6
6BA	6A
6BS1	6AS1
6BS2	6AS2
6BS3	6AS3

The 6AS3 form class was officially recognized in September of the academic year spanning 2011–2012. There are 28 populated form classes at present.

== Academics ==
Naparima College offers a diverse selection of subject areas. Many of which are drawn from the fields of Science, Mathematics, Business Studies, Modern Studies and Creative Arts.

At the end of three years, Form 3 students must sit the National Certificate of Secondary Education (NCSE) examinations. Whilst at the end of five years, Form 5 students sit the Caribbean Secondary Education Certificate Examinations (CSEC) examinations and the Caribbean Advanced Proficiency Examinations (CAPE) Examinations at the Form 6 level.

=== Form 1 Level ===
The Form 1 Level consists of the youngest students at Naparima College. Academically, the subjects offered to these students are extremely similar to what they were exposed to at the Primary Level albeit, a little more advanced. Students at this level may be allowed to go into the Library during regular class hours for periods of study.

Subjects offered at the Form 1 Level:

- Art
- Drama
- English Language
- English Literature
- French - As of 2016
- Integrated Science
- Information Technology
- Mathematics
- Music
- Physical Education
- Religious Instructions
- Social Studies
- Spanish
  - Technical Education
  - Geography
  - Library Studies

=== Form 2 Level ===
Subjects offered at the Form 2 Level:

- Art
- Biology
- Chemistry
- English Language
- English Literature
- French - as of 2017
- History
- Mathematics
- Information Technology
- Physical Education
- Physics
- Social Studies/History
- Spanish

=== Form 3 Level ===
The form 3 level is the level at which students prepare for the National Certificate of Secondary Education (NCSE) examinations. Essentially, students at this level are exposed to all the academic fields of study offered at Naparima College. Thus aiding them in selecting subjects for further study at the CSEC level and possible careers. They are also encouraged to attend the Career Guidance Seminars held annually at Naparima College.

Subjects offered at the Form 3 Level:

- Art
- Biology
- Business Studies
- Chemistry
- Drama
- English Language
- English Literature
- French
- Geography
- History
- Information Technology
- Mathematics
- Music
- Physical Education
- Physics
- Spanish

=== Forms 4 & 5 Levels ===
The Form 4 & 5 Levels are the levels at which students prepare for the Caribbean Secondary Education Certificate Examinations – CSEC

Entry into Form 4 is based on the subjects selected by students upon promotion from the Form 3 Level. Each student is required to study at least nine subjects, four of which are compulsory – English Language, English Literature, Mathematics and either a choice of Biology or Human and Social Biology. Students continue into Form 5 with the subjects they have selected and write the CSEC examinations at the end of their 5th Form academic year.

Subjects offered at the Form 4 & 5 Levels:

- Additional Mathematics
- Biology - compulsory
- Chemistry
- English Language – compulsory
- English Literature – compulsory
- French
- Geography
- History
- Human & Social Biology
- Information Technology
- Mathematics – compulsory
- Physical Education
- Physics
- Principles of Accounts
- Principles of Business
- Social Studies
- Spanish

The following subjects are also offered at the Form 4 & 5 Levels albeit not during normally timetabled sessions:

- Technical Drawing
- Visual and Performing Arts (one choice of either Art or Music or Drama)

=== Sixth form ===
The sixth form is split into two sub-levels, the Lower Sixth Form and the Upper Sixth Form. These are the levels at which students prepare for the Caribbean Advanced Proficiency Examinations – CAPE

Application to this level may occur after fifth form students obtain their CSEC results. Students at this level are allowed a choice to study 3 academic subjects (some opt for 4 and may be accepted) and 1 compulsory subject Communication Studies at the lower sixth form and Caribbean Studies at the upper sixth form. However choice of subjects is limited; for example, a student who only studied modern studies subjects at the CSEC level (History, Social Studies etc.) is barred to study subjects such as Pure Mathematics or Physics at the CAPE level.

Subjects at the CAPE Level tend to be divided into Units. Lower sixth form students study Unit 1 of their chosen subjects while the Unit 2 subject counterparts are studied at the Upper sixth form level. However exceptions may be made in which the Unit 2 of a subject may be studied at the lower sixth form followed by Unit 1 at the upper sixth form. Only the Units 1 of the compulsory subjects – Caribbean Studies and Communication Studies are studied.

Subjects offered at the Sixth Form Level:

- Accounting
- Animation and game design
- Applied mathematics
- Biology
- Caribbean studies – compulsory
- Chemistry
- Communication studies – compulsory
- Computer science
- Economics
- Entrepreneurship
- Environmental science
- French
- Geography
- History
- Information technology
- Literature in English
- Management of business
- Performing arts
- Physical education
- Physics
- Pure mathematics
- Sociology
- Spanish

=== President Medal Gold Winners ===
The President's Medal Gold is awarded to the highest performing student nationally in the Caribbean Advanced Proficiency Examinations(CAPE) each year. As of 2021, Naparima College has won the President's Medal Gold six times.

President Medal Gold Winners
Year	Student Name
1987	Asad Mohammed
2003	Kevin Singh
2004	Dennis Ramdass
2006	Jansen Scheult
2012	Marcus Belasco
2021	Niall Hosein

=== Admissions ===
Admission to Naparima College is determined by performance on an examination, known as the Secondary Entrance Assessment (S.E.A) .Being a Denominational school that was originally founded by Christian missionaries from Canada, the Presbyterian Church in Trinidad and Tobago (PCTT) has the prerogative of selecting 20% of the annual intake of new students into Form 1. This is a practice that is also exercised by all of the other religious organisations in Trinidad and Tobago (e.g. the Roman Catholic Church, the Anglican Church, the Anjuman Sunnat ul Jamaat Association (A.S.J.A.) and the Sanatan Dharma Maha Sabha (S.D.M.S.)) where they have jurisdiction over secondary schools in this regard and therefore should not be construed as unfair in any way whatsoever. The S.E.A examination comprises three papers that must be attempted by all candidates; Creative Writing, Mathematics and Language Arts. Naparima College tends to be an institution of first choice of the four prospective institutions each examine is required to list, in preferential order of interest prior to the examination. The four preferences are drawn from the totality of secondary institutions in Trinidad and Tobago. For a candidate to attain admission, he must obtain a percentage of 94–100 after writing the examinations. Female students have not been accepted since 1967 and can instead apply for the Naparima Girls High School.

== Student life ==
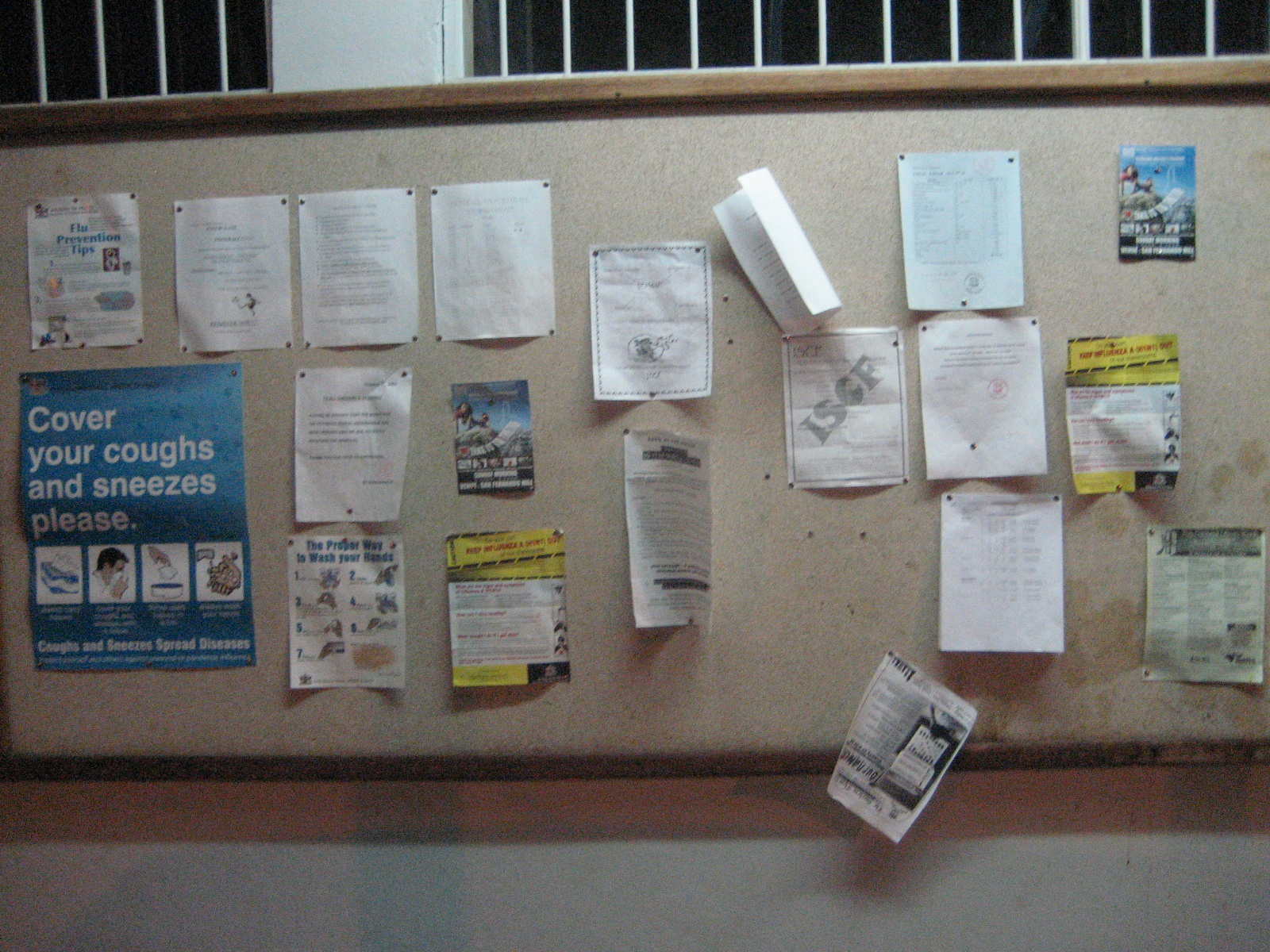
Notice board at Naps displaying flyers

Naparima College offers a range of clubs and activities which students may join.

Extracurricular activities are supported by the administration and teaching staff because they provide students with opportunities to develop into well-rounded individuals, contributing to the school's overall educational performance .

The following is a list (as of September 2015) of clubs and activities:

- 1st Naparima College Sea Scout Troop
- African Cultural Club - A.C.C
- Art Club
- Astronomy Club
- Audio-Visual Club
- Anime Club
- Big-Brother Program
- Chess Club
- Club Castilé – The UNESCO Spanish Club
- Culinary Club
- Drama Club
- Disaster Preparedness Club
- Environmental Club
- Essay Writing
- Film and Photography Club
- French Club
- Geography Club
- Guitar Club
- Indian Cultural Club – I.C.C.
- Information Technology (I.T.) Club
- Inter School Christian Fellowship – I.S.C.F.
- Keyboard/Piano Club
- Mathematics Club
- Naparima College Choir
- Naparima College Pan Ensemble – Naparhythms
- Naparima College Islamic Society − N.C.I.S
- Naparima College Media Association - N.C.M.A
- Rotary International – Interact Club
- Rhythm Section
- Scrabble Club
- Sports – Cricket, Football, Table Tennis, Lawn Tennis, Martial Arts, Athletics, Volleyball, Golf, Swimming, Scuba Diving, Badminton and more.
- Student Council
- Spanish Club
- Tassa Group
- The Literary and Debating Society – L.A.D.S.
- The Naparima College Peer Supporters
- Writers' Guild

- More clubs to be stated

The following competitions occur within Naparima College. Hence this does not include students who participate in competitions to which Naparima College is not the host of. Such would fall into the aforementioned category of Extra-curricular activities and clubs, whose members (and members of the student population not related to a club or activity) are allowed to 'represent' the school in various external competitions. However they may be considered as a sub-class of extra-curricular activity.

Competitions within Naparima College include:

- Elocution Contest
- Events of Sports Day
- Oration Contest
- Science Fair
- Inter-class Competitions

Such activities and clubs have regular meetings and encourage their members to participate in various competitions or creative events and even charity. If any student wishes to suggest an activity not listed, they may petition and propose their idea to any one of the administrative teaching staff and have it evaluated. As such the aforementioned list is constantly growing.

== Academic year ==
The following is a list of events that are annually held at Naparima College during each academic year. (Some events may not occur during the term mentioned and as such, may be subjected to change). The events are listed in the order of occurrence.

=== Term 1 ===
- Interclass Football Competition
- School Bazaar (Normally The First Saturday in October)
- Speech Day
- Oration Contest
- Eid Celebrations
- Divali Celebrations
- End of Term Examinations
- Christmas Celebrations

=== Term 2 ===
- Parents' Day
- Inter-Class Cricket Tournament
- Founder's Day
- Teachers Vs. Students Annual Cricket Match
- Elocution Contest
- Sports Day
- Carnival Celebrations
- Naparima College's Annual Walkathon
- End of Term Examinations
- Easter Celebrations
- Upper 6 Sleepover

=== Term 3 ===
- Annual Prize Giving and Awards Functions
- Student Baccalaureate Service
- CSEC and CAPE Examinations
- End of Term Examinations
- Graduates' Dinner and Dance

Apart from those listed, numerous other events occur at various times throughout an academic year at Naparima College.

These may include the following:

- Regular meetings of the Naparima Association of Parents School and Community (NAPSAC)
- Fundraisers (hosted by student clubs)
- Events hosted by the Naparima Association of Past Students (NAPS) such as the "Breakfast On The Hill" or the "Naps Men Can Cook Too"
- Career Guidance Seminars (other secondary schools may be invited to attend)
- Eid Celebrations
- Valedictory Ceremonies

Various other special occasions may also be held.

The first major event would be that of the annual school bazaar which takes place on the school's campus. This social event normally occurs during the month of October and is usually on a weekend, most commonly on a Saturday afternoon. Each class would be given the responsibility of a particular stall from which planning may begin a few weeks beforehand. These stalls may take the form of many miscellaneous activities including games such as the popular air rifle or the tin pan alley, sale of food and drinks, and attractions such as a horror house, car show and disco. The entire bazaar itself serves a dual purpose of being both a social event and a fundraiser.

Speech Day is usually the day which might also be referred to as a Graduation Day, however it is also the day for recognizing the academic achievements of both the Form 5 and Upper Form 6 students, the latter of whom it would be considered as a Graduation Day. Certificates and awards for academic achievements in the Caribbean Secondary Education Certificate examinations and Caribbean Advanced Proficiency Examinations as well as other academic achievements are distributed to the students at this official ceremony. Teachers, parents, guardians and special guests are normally issued invitations to attend.

== House system ==
The House System was instituted in 1959 by then-principal Rev. Lute. Each member of the student population is usually assigned to a particular house during their form 1 year and remain in that house during the rest of their academic career at Naparima College.

The houses usually compete with each other in some aspects of school life, most significantly is that of the annual Sports Day, where each house competes for the top ranking in sporting activities at Naparima College. Initially there were six houses but was then reduced to four.

The four houses are as follows:

- Flemington House (gold) – named for Allen Flemington, who served as a missionary and a French teacher at the school from 1939 to 1940. He left the school to volunteer for service in World War II as a fighter pilot, where he died in combat.
- Grant House (green) – named for the founder of Naparima College, Kenneth J. Grant.
- Sammy House (blue) – named for James Sammy, who taught at Naparima College from 1912 to 1968.He was the father of two other Masters at the college - Carl Sammy, long standing History teacher at Naparima College until his retirement in 2006 and David Sammy, former Vice Principal at Naparima College who later went on to become the Principal of Tableland High School in 2009.
- Walls House (red) – named for long-serving principal, Victor B. Walls.

== Publications ==
=== The Olympian Magazine ===
Naparima College has a school magazine dubbed The Olympian which was started in 1945 by Ralph Laltoo. Efforts are made to publish one annually. It usually acts as a yearbook and highlights the events which may have transpired during a particular academic year at Naparima College. These may include academic and sporting achievements as well as brief summaries of extracurricular clubs and activities and special events such as the school bazaar or valedictory functions. Many of these normally being from the perspective of the student population.

=== The Naparima College Handbook ===
Normally issued to students during their Form 1 year, the Naparima College Handbook outlines the rules of the institution, codes of conduct as well as other information regarding school life.

== Notable alumni ==
Name	Notability	Ref.
Miguel de la Bastide	Flamenco composer and virtuoso guitarist, based in Toronto, who has performed extensively in North America, Europe and Asia since 1992 and was a recipient of the Chalmers Award as well as the Toronto Arts Council Award.	
Sir Isaac Hyatali	Former Chief Justice of the Republic of Trinidad and Tobago from 1972 until 1983. He was knighted by Queen Elizabeth II in 1973.	
Winston Dookeran	Former Governor of the Central Bank of Trinidad and Tobago and founder and former leader of the political party, Congress of the People (COP). Served in the capacity of acting Prime Minister on many occasions and has contributed to Economic research and policy throughout the Caribbean and Latin America during his role as Senior Economist at the United Nations Economic Commission for Latin America and the Caribbean (ECLAC), a United Nations regional commission headquartered in Santiago, Chile.	
Mervyn M. Dymally	California State Assemblyman, former U.S. Congressman representing California's 31st congressional district and former Lieutenant Governor of California in The United States of America.	
Angelo Bissesarsingh	Historian and author who was awarded the Hummingbird Medal Gold for his service in the field of education and history.	
Darren Ganga	Former West Indies Cricket Team vice-captain and former captain of the Trinidad and Tobago national cricket team.	
Noor Hassanali	Second President of Trinidad and Tobago, serving for a decade during the period 1987 - 1997 and is a cousin of both Manny Ramjohn and Dr. Jean Ramjohn-Richards. Was also a footballer on the Naparima College football team during his time as a student.	
Rikki Jai	Trinidadian chutney-soca artist who has won the Chutney Soca Monarch title at least 7 times between 1998 and 2015, establishing a new record in terms of the number of titles to be won by a single artiste in that genre of music. His most commercially successful release is Mor Tor featuring fellow Trinidadian soca star Machel Montano.	
Leonson Lewis	Former football player who represented Trinidad and Tobago on the national level and was also part of the famous 'Strike Squad' of the late 1980s. He has played internationally for seven different clubs in Portugal spanning a period of a decade.	
Sir Trevor McDonald	Prominent radio and television broadcaster at ITV in the United Kingdom. He was knighted by Queen Elizabeth II, as 'Keeper of the English Language" and is also an author.	
Ralph Maraj	Trinidad and Tobago politician (former Government minister and Member of Parliament in the House of Representatives (Trinidad and Tobago), holding the portfolio of Minister of Foreign Affairs (Trinidad and Tobago)) and playwright who starred in the 1975 local film Bim.	
Kenneth Ramchand	Professor Emeritus of English at the University of the West Indies, St. Augustine and Independent Senator (Senate of Trinidad and Tobago and author who was awarded the Chaconia Medal Gold for his work in Literature, education and culture.	
Manny Ramjohn	Athlete. The Manny Ramjohn Stadium in Marabella Trinidad and Tobago was named in his honor in the year 2000.	
Jean Ramjohn-Richards	Former First Lady of Trinidad and Tobago.	
Adrian Cola Rienzi	Trinidad and Tobago trade unionist, politician and lawyer who founded both the Oilfields Workers Trade Union (OWTU) and the All Trinidad Sugar Estates and Factory Workers Union.	
Lall Sawh	Urologist who pioneered kidney transplantation in the Caribbean in 1988 and was the youngest person in the history of Trinidad and Tobago to be awarded the Chaconia Medal Gold for his contribution to surgery in the nation.	
Samuel Selvon	Author who was awarded 2 Guggenheim Fellowships in 1955 and 1968, the Hummingbird Medal Gold for Literature in 1969 was posthumously awarded the Chaconia Medal Gold for Literature in 1994.	
Errol Sitahal	Actor who made appearances in several Hollywood films and has had small parts in the television series Side Effects and Relic Hunter.	
Samuel Badree	Renowned international cricketer who has played for clubs in Australia and the Indian subcontinent and is regarded as one of the world's best bowlers.	
Shahdon Winchester	Trinidad and Tobago professional footballer who has played internationally for clubs in Azerbaijan, Finland and Mexico.	
Sprangalang	Formally and officially known as Dennis Hall, Sprangalang is a comedian, historian, actor, producer and singer/composer who was featured in the 2007 Canadian feature film "A Winter Tale".	
Errol Fabien	Popular local television and radio presenter who also ran as an independent politician during elections in the constituency of Saint Joseph, Trinidad and Tobago.	
Nicholas Pooran	Cricketer who has played internationally for clubs in the Indian subcontinent and South Africa and was the youngest player to have appeared in the Caribbean Premier League (CPL) matches during the 2014 season. During the 2024 season of the Caribbean Premier League, he broke the record for the most T20 runs set in a calendar year.	
Cephas Cooper	Cricketer who played in the 2018 Under-19 Cricket World Cup.	

== Miscellanea ==
=== Motto ===
The Naparima College Insignia

"A posse ad esse"

This Latin phrase literally translates into English as "From Possibility To Actuality".

The motto was selected by a contest launched by Rev. Dr. Victor B. Walls among the staff and students shortly after his arrival in 1923. The identity of the person who coined the motto remains a mystery. The motto serves as a force to encourage students to strive to be the best that they can be in all aspects of school life and in their other achievements. It is inscribed on the school's insignia.

=== Rationale ===
Naparima College, the pioneer secondary school in San Fernando, was founded in 1894 by the Canadian Presbyterian Missionaries to spread education and civilisation amongst the depressed indentured immigrant population.

=== College Hymn or College Anthem ===
This college hymn was written around 1930 by Marion Elizabeth Walls, the wife of Reverend Victor Benjamin Walls. The melody is that of a well-known 18th-century evangelical hymn, recorded in the Anglican and Presbyterian hymn-books, and known variously as The Church of God, Thou whose Almighty Word, and Come, thou Almighty King.

== See also ==
- Naparima Girls' High School
- Hillview College
- Iere High School
- List of schools in Trinidad and Tobago
