= Walter Reed (cricketer) =

English cricketer

Personal information
- Full name: Walter Reed
- Born: 4 February 1839; Sompting, Sussex, England
- Died: 17 March 1880 (aged 41); Storrington, Sussex, England
- Batting: Right-handed
- Bowling: Left-arm roundarm fast
- Relatives: Albert Reed (brother)

Domestic team information
- Years: Team
- 1860: Sussex

Career statistics
Competition	First-class
Matches	6
Runs scored	38
Batting average	4.22
100s/50s	–/–
Top score	10*
Balls bowled	284
Wickets	2
Bowling average	51.50
5 wickets in innings	–
10 wickets in match	–
Best bowling	1/8
Catches/stumpings	–/–
- Source: Cricinfo, 31 December 2011

Walter Bartlett Reed (4 February 1839 – 17 March 1880) was an English cricketer. Reed was a right-handed batsman who bowled left-arm roundarm fast. He was born at Sompting, Sussex.

Reed made his first-class debut for Sussex against Surrey in 1860. He made five further first-class appearances for the county that season, the last of which came against the Marylebone Cricket Club. In his six first-class appearances, he scored a total of 38 runs at an average of 4.22, with a high score of 10 not out. With the ball, he took 2 wickets at a bowling average of 51.50, with best figures of 1/8.

He died at Storrington, Sussex on 17 March 1880. His brother, Albert, also played first-class cricket for Sussex.
