= Vincent Valentine (cricketer) =

West Indian cricketer

Cricket information
- Batting: Right-handed
- Bowling: Right-arm fast-medium

International information
- National side: West Indies
- Test debut (cap 34): 22 July 1933 v England
- Last Test: 12 August 1933 v England

Career statistics
Competition	Test	First-class
Matches	2	24
Runs scored	35	500
Batting average	11.66	17.85
100s/50s	0/0	0/1
Top score	19*	59*
Balls bowled	288	4,604
Wickets	1	49
Bowling average	104.00	40.40
5 wickets in innings	0	0
10 wickets in match	0	0
Best bowling	1/55	4/83
Catches/stumpings	0/–	11/–
- Source: CricInfo, 30 October 2022

Vincent Adolphus Valentine (4 April 1908 – 6 July 1972) was a West Indiean cricketer. He was born at Portland, Jamaica in 1908, and died at Kingston, Jamaica in 1972, aged 64. He was a fast-medium bowler that never really gave batsmen an easy shot, keeping as he did a perfect length, turning the ball both ways off the pitch and swinging it sharply through the air. He was also a forceful lower-order batsman and a safe fielder. He made his first-class debut for Jamaica in a memorable match at Melbourne Park, in February 1932 playing against Lord Tennyson's touring team. Although he did not bat, due solely to Jamaica's first innings score of 702 for 5 declared, he took four wickets in the match to play his part in Jamaica's victory by an innings and 97 runs. It was in this particular match that George Headley (344 not out) and Clarence Passailaigue (261 not out) made an unbeaten stand of 487 that remains a sixth-wicket record. After just one further match a year later, a match in which he did nothing of note with either the bat or the ball, he was selected for the West Indies tour to England in 1933. In truth, he only made the tour as a substitute for Learie Constantine who had availability restrictions due to his Lancashire League commitments for Nelson. Nineteen of Valentine's 24 first-class matches came on the tour, including his two Test matches (the 2nd and 3rd of the trip) in which his most noted achievement was his 19 not out in the visitor's second innings at Old Trafford. Valentine's death in 1972 went unreported at the time and therefore no obituary appeared for him within the pages of Wisden.

== Works cited ==
- Martin-Jenkins, Christopher (1996). World Cricketers: A Biographical Dictionary. Oxford: Oxford University Press. ISBN 978-0-19-210005-4.
- Frindall, Bill (1995). The Wisden Book of Test Cricket, Volume 1 (1877–1977). Headline Book Publishing. ISBN 978-0747211174.
- Lawrence, Bridgette; Goble, Ray (January 1, 1991). The Complete Record of West Indian Test Cricketers. ACL & Polar Publishing Ltd. ISBN 978-0951486221.
