= Fred Grant (cricketer) =

Trinidadian cricketer

Personal information
- Full name: Frederick Geddes Grant
- Born: 4 October 1891; Port of Spain, Trinidad
- Died: 26 June 1946 (aged 54); York, Toronto, Ontario, Canada
- Relatives: Lindsay Grant (brother); Jackie Grant (brother); Rolph Grant (brother)

Domestic team information
- Years: Team
- 1924/25–1926/27: Trinidad

Career statistics
Competition	First-class
Matches	6
Runs scored	160
Batting average	17.77
100s/50s	0/0
Top score	45
Balls bowled	612
Wickets	9
Bowling average	30.66
5 wickets in innings	0
10 wickets in match	0
Best bowling	3/18
Catches/stumpings	5/–
- Source: CricInfo, 4 April 2020

Frederick Geddes Grant OBE (4 October 1891 – 26 June 1946) was a Trinidadian cricketer, cricket administrator and businessman.

== Life and career ==
Fred Grant was the oldest of 10 children of Thomas Geddes Grant (born in Canada in 1866), who founded a trading company, T. Geddes Grant, in Trinidad in 1901. He was born in 1891 in Port of Spain, where he went to school at Queen's Royal College, and later had his university education in Canada.

A middle-order batsman and change bowler, Grant played six first-class matches for Trinidad between 1925 and 1927. When Trinidad won the final of the Inter-Colonial Tournament in 1925-26 he top-scored in Trinidad's successful run-chase in the second innings with 45. He captained Trinidad in 1926-27 when they lost the final to Barbados after leading by 384 on the first innings.

Grant was President of the West Indies Cricket Board of Control in the 1930s. His younger brothers Jack and Rolph captained the West Indies Test team in the 1930s.

Fred Grant was awarded the OBE in 1935. After the death of his father he led the family company, T. Geddes Grant, until his own death. He died suddenly of heart failure in June 1946 while visiting one of his brothers in Toronto.
