= Archie Wiles =

West Indian cricketer (1892–1957)

Personal information
- Full name: Charles Archibald Wiles
- Born: 11 August 1892; Bridgetown, Barbados
- Died: 2 November 1957 (aged 65); Diego Martin, Trinidad and Tobago
- Batting: Right-handed

International information
- National side: West Indies
- Only Test (cap 35): 22 July 1933 v England

Domestic team information
- Years: Team
- 1919-20 to 1935-36: Trinidad

Career statistics
| Competition | Tests | First-class |
|---|---|---|
| Matches | 1 | 38 |
| Runs scored | 2 | 1,766 |
| Batting average | 1.00 | 27.59 |
| 100s/50s | 0/0 | 2/6 |
| Top score | 2 | 192 |
| Balls bowled | - | - |
| Wickets | - | - |
| Bowling average | - | - |
| 5 wickets in innings | - | - |
| 10 wickets in match | - | - |
| Best bowling | -/- | -/- |
| Catches/stumpings | 0/- | 7/- |
- Source: Cricinfo

Charles Archibald Wiles (11 August 1892 – 4 November 1957) was a cricketer who played one Test for West Indies in 1933.

A useful middle-order batsman whose first-class career extended from 1920 to 1936, Archie Wiles remains the second-oldest Test debutant for West Indies. He was 40 years and 345 days old when he appeared in the Second Test against England in 1933. He is surpassed in age only by Nelson Betancourt who was 42 years, 242 days old on his Test debut in 1930.

In spite of some good performances with the bat in first-class cricket, Wiles failed when the big occasion came at Old Trafford in 1933, scoring just 0 and 2. Although he was born in Barbados, he played his domestic cricket for Trinidad in the Caribbean’s annual inter-colonial tournament. During his career, he surpassed fifty runs in an innings on eight occasions, twice going on to make a century: in February 1925 he scored 110 against British Guiana at Port-of-Spain, Trinidad, and two years later scored 192 against Barbados at Bridgetown. This game, a timeless match played over eight days, was remarkable insofar as despite Wiles's first innings total, which included a fourth-wicket partnership of 146 with Joe Small, and Trinidad’s first innings lead of 384, Barbados won by 146 runs (Barbados 175 and 726, Trinidad 559 and 217).
