= Lindsay Grant (businessman) =

West Indian cricket umpire

Personal information
- Full name: Kenneth Lindsay Grant
- Born: 10 February 1899; Trinidad and Tobago
- Died: 23 January 1989 (aged 89); Port of Spain, Trinidad and Tobago
- Relatives: Jackie Grant (brother); Rolph Grant (brother)

Umpiring information
- Tests umpired: 1 (1930)
- Source: Cricinfo, 6 July 2013

Sir Kenneth Lindsay Grant OBE (10 February 1899 – 23 January 1989) was a Trinidad and Tobago businessman, Test cricket umpire and cricket administrator.

== Life and career ==
Lindsay Grant went to school at Queen's Royal College in Port of Spain and later had his university education in Canada. He played non-first-class cricket for South Trinidad in the Beaumont Cup from 1926 to 1939. He umpired one Test match, West Indies vs. England, in 1930. His younger brothers Jack and Rolph each captained the West Indies Test team in the 1930s.

Grant served in both the First and the Second World War. He took over the running of the family trading firm, T. Geddes Grant, in 1946 after his brother Fred died. He was a member of the West Indies Cricket Board of Control from 1959 to 1970.

Grant was awarded the OBE in 1956 and was knighted in 1962. Trinidad and Tobago awarded him the Chaconia Gold Medal in 1969 for his philanthropy and voluntary social work. He wrote his memoirs, To Live Twice Over, to Live Forever: Memoirs of Sir Lindsay Grant, in 1988.

== See also ==
- List of Test cricket umpires
