= Albert Reed (cricketer) =

English cricketer

Albert Adams Reed (16 November 1846 – 8 May 1931) was an English cricketer active from 1867 to 1873 who played for Sussex. He was born in Sompting, Sussex and died in Littlehampton. He appeared in 27 first-class matches as a righthanded batsman who bowled right arm medium pace with a roundarm action. He scored 620 runs with a highest score of 70 not out and took 23 wickets with a best performance of five for 28.
