= Oscar Da Costa =

West Indian cricketer

Personal information
- Born: 11 September 1907; Kingston, Jamaica
- Died: 1 October 1936 (aged 29); Kingston, Jamaica
- Batting: Right-handed
- Bowling: Right-arm medium

International information
- National side: West Indies
- Test debut (cap 27): 3 April 1930 v England
- Last Test: 24 January 1935 v England

Career statistics
Competition	Test	First-class
Matches	5	39
Runs scored	153	1,563
Batting average	19.12	29.49
100s/50s	0/0	1/9
Top score	39	105*
Balls bowled	372	4,128
Wickets	3	44
Bowling average	58.33	40.13
5 wickets in innings	0	0
10 wickets in match	0	0
Best bowling	1/14	4/31
Catches/stumpings	5/–	30/–
- Source: CricInfo, 30 October 2022

Oscar Constantine Da Costa (11 September 1911 – 1 October 1936) was a West Indian cricketer who played in five Test matches for the West Indies cricket team during the 1930s. He was born at Kingston, Jamaica in September 1907 and died there prematurely in October 1936, aged just 29.

A reliable batsman, a useful medium-pace bowler and an agile, versatile fielder, he made his first-class career for Jamaica in February 1929 against a touring England XI put together and led by Sir Julien Cahn; Da Costa himself bowled the opposing captain for 0 in the visitor's first innings. In 1930, in only his fifth first-class match, he was selected to play in the fourth Test match against England and performed adequately, scoring 39 in his only visit to the crease, taking a wicket in each of the English innings and holding three catches in the match. In 1933, he was selected to tour England with West Indies. He scored over 1,000 runs on the tour at an average of 26.82, including his maiden century, 105 against Essex at Leyton. However, he was less successful in the three Test matches, scoring just 70 runs from six innings and taking one wicket.

After this, Da Costa appeared just once more for the West Indies, this being the second Test of England's visit to the Caribbean at Port of Spain in 1934/35 where he helped the home team to a convincing victory. Oscar da Costa never played a first-class match against any of the other colonial islands and only nine of his 39 matches were for Jamaica. All his matches were played against Select XIs, against counties and Universities on the 1933 tour, or were played against England in Test matches.

He was considered something of a joker and carried a rubber stamp with his signature on to save time went asked to provide and autograph or two! Da Costa has the unenviable distinction of being the first West Indian Test cricketer to die but no obituary originally appeared within the covers Wisden for him.

== Sources ==
1. World Cricketers - A Biographical Dictionary by Christopher Martin-Jenkins published by Oxford University Press (1996),
2. The Wisden Book of Test Cricket, Volume 1 (1877-1977) compiled and edited by Bill Frindall published by Headline Book Publishing (1995),
3. The Complete Record of West Indian Test Cricketers by Bridgette Lawrence & Ray Goble published by ACL & Polar Publishing (UK) Ltd. (1991),
