= Ellis Achong =

West Indian cricketer

Personal information
- Full name: Ellis Edgar Achong
- Born: 16 February 1904; Belmont, Trinidad and Tobago
- Died: 30 August 1986 (aged 82); St. Augustine, Trinidad and Tobago
- Nickname: Puss
- Batting: Left-handed
- Bowling: Slow left-arm orthodox Slow left-arm wrist-spin

International information
- National side: West Indies
- Test debut (cap 22): 1 February 1930 v England
- Last Test: 28 January 1935 v England

Domestic team information
- Years: Team
- 1929–1935: Trinidad

Umpiring information
- Tests umpired: 1 (1954)

Career statistics
Competition	Test	First-class
Matches	6	38
Runs scored	81	503
Batting average	8.10	14.37
100s/50s	0/0	0/0
Top score	22	45 not out
Balls bowled	918	7,799
Wickets	8	110
Bowling average	47.25	30.23
5 wickets in innings	0	3
10 wickets in match	0	1
Best bowling	2/64	7/73
Catches/stumpings	6/–	20/–
- Source: Cricinfo, 3 February 2009

Ellis Edgar Achong (16 February 1904 – 29 August 1986) was a sportsman from Trinidad and Tobago in the West Indies. He played cricket for the West Indies and was the first person of known Chinese descent to play in a Test match.

Achong was born in Belmont, Port of Spain. He played football as a left-winger for a local team, Maple, in the 1920s and 1930s, and represented Trinidad and Tobago from 1919 to 1932.

Achong is better known for playing cricket. He was mainly a bowler. His stock ball was left-arm orthodox spin (left-arm finger spin). After bowling Walter Robins stumped at Old Trafford in 1933, it is reputed that Robins said to the umpire, Joe Hardstaff Sr., "fancy being done by a bloody Chinaman". Learie Constantine is said to have replied: "Do you mean the bowler or the ball?" An unorthodox left-arm spin delivery (spinning from the off side to the leg side for a right-handed batsman) was sometimes known as a "chinaman" delivery, although the term is now rarely used. However, Achong did not bowl unorthodox left-arm spin – the first Test player to do so is believed to be Charles Llewellyn of South Africa.

Achong played in six Test matches for the West Indies against the English cricket team from 1930 to 1935, three in the West Indies and three in the 1933 tour of England. In all, Achong took eight Test wickets at a bowling average of 47.25, but his Test figures belie his much greater success at regional level in the West Indies between 1929–30 and 1934–35. In the final of the Inter-Colonial Tournament of 1931–32, he took 3 for 74 and 7 for 73 to bowl Trinidad to victory over British Guiana.

He married during the 1933 tour of England and settled in Manchester. After his last Test match, he continued to play cricket for several clubs in the Lancashire Leagues until 1951, taking more than 1,000 wickets, including 10 in an innings for Burnley against Todmorden in 1945.

He returned to Trinidad and Tobago in 1952, and stood as a Test umpire in the 4th Test between West Indies and England at Port of Spain in March 1954, a high-scoring draw in which West Indies scored an imposing 681 for 8 declared, with the 3 "W"s (Everton Weekes, Frank Worrell and Clyde Walcott) all scoring centuries in West Indies' first innings, and Peter May and Denis Compton doing the same in England's 537 in reply.

Achong later became a sports coach with the Trinidad and Tobago Ministry of Education, coaching and selecting the Trinidad and Tobago cricket team. He died aged 82 in St. Augustine.
