= Cyril Merry =

West Indian cricketer

Personal information
- Full name: Cyril Arthur Merry
- Born: 20 January 1911; Scarborough, Tobago
- Died: 19 April 1964 (aged 53); St Clair, Port of Spain, Trinidad and Tobago
- Batting: Right-handed
- Relatives: David Merry (brother)

International information
- National side: West Indies
- Test debut (cap 33): 24 June 1933 v England
- Last Test: 12 August 1933 v England

Domestic team information
- Years: Team
- 1929/30–1938/39: Trinidad

Career statistics
Competition	Test	First-class
Matches	2	37
Runs scored	34	1,547
Batting average	8.50	27.14
100s/50s	0/0	1/4
Top score	13	146
Balls bowled	–	1,773
Wickets	–	33
Bowling average	–	22.60
5 wickets in innings	–	0
10 wickets in match	–	0
Best bowling	–	3/13
Catches/stumpings	1/–	33/–
- Source: Cricinfo, 4 January 2018

Cyril Arthur Merry (20 January 1911 – 19 April 1964) was a cricketer who played for Trinidad and Tobago and West Indies.

Merry was a hard-hitting right-hand batsman and occasional bowler who had played only a handful of matches for Trinidad before he was picked for the 1933 West Indies tour of England. He was one of the more forceful batsmen in the side, and his 146 in the match against Warwickshire was made at more than a run a minute. But he was not a success in the Test matches: at Lord's in the first match he made 9 and 1; recalled for the third match at The Oval he scored 13 and 11.

An influential figure in Trinidad cricket over many years, Merry captained the Trinidad team in inter-colonial matches several times in the later 1930s, but never made another century or Test appearance. His bowling appears to have been used largely to change ends or break partnerships.

Merry was also captain of the Queen's Park Cricket Club in Port of Spain and later its secretary. He also served as secretary to the West Indies Cricket Board of Control and as Trinidad's representative on it, and he was manager of the 1951-52 West Indies team in Australia and New Zealand. He died of a heart attack.
