= Rolph Grant =

West Indian cricketer

- Rolph Grant in 1939

Personal information
- Full name: Rolph Stewart Grant
- Born: 15 December 1909; Port of Spain, Trinidad
- Died: 18 October 1977 (aged 67); Oakville, Ontario, Canada
- Batting: Right-handed
- Bowling: Right arm off break
- Relatives: Fred Grant (brother); Lindsay Grant (brother); Jackie Grant (brother)

International information
- National side: West Indies
- Test debut (cap 39): 8 January 1935 v England
- Last Test: 19 August 1939 v England

Domestic team information
- Years: Team
- 1932 to 1933: Cambridge University
- 1933–34 to 1938–39: Trinidad

Career statistics
Competition	Test	First-class
Matches	7	48
Runs scored	220	1,883
Batting average	22.00	28.53
100s/50s	0/1	1/10
Top score	77	152
Balls bowled	353	1,989
Wickets	11	79
Bowling average	32.09	25.17
5 wickets in innings	0	0
10 wickets in match	0	0
Best bowling	3/68	4/41
Catches/stumpings	13/0	66/0
- Source: CricInfo, 30 May 2019

Rolph Stewart Grant OBE (15 December 1909 – 18 October 1977) was a West Indian cricketer who captained West Indies on their 1939 tour of England. He played first-class cricket for Cambridge University in 1932 and 1933, and then for Trinidad from 1934 to 1939.

== Life and career ==
Rolph Grant was a middle-order batsman and off-spin bowler. He made his highest first-class score for Trinidad against Barbados in 1933–34, when he scored 55 and 152, top-scoring in each innings. In the 10-wicket victory over Hampshire on the 1939 tour he top-scored with 54 and took his best figures of 4 for 41 and 2 for 24. When the West Indies needed an opening batsman during the 1939 tour he took over the role, opening with Jeffrey Stollmeyer in all three Tests, with a highest score of 47.

He took over the captaincy of the West Indies team from his brother Jackie Grant. Two other brothers played cricket but without the same level of success. Rolph had not always been picked for the Cambridge University team, but he was a gifted sportsman, being a national amateur footballer and being heavyweight boxing champion for his country. Later pundits put Rolph's selection as captain down to his race. The selectors wanted a white captain and Rolph fitted that requirement. Discussing the West Indian captaincy in his history of West Indian cricket, Michael Manley described Grant as "a man of great decency and intelligence", but in his qualifications for the captaincy he was "far more importantly the son of a wealthy and powerful Trinidadian family ... It was the families who were accustomed to ruling who were assumed to produce the sons who were capable of leading."

Grant married Margaret Kennedy in Windsor, Ontario, in 1934. They had three sons. They lived in Jamaica, where he was a director of the family company, Geddes Grant. He was also a prominent voluntary social worker, and was awarded the OBE for this work in the 1961 New Year Honours. He died in 1977.

Preceded by Jackie Grant	West Indies Test cricket captains 1939	Succeeded by George Headley
