= Jackie Grant =

West Indian cricketer

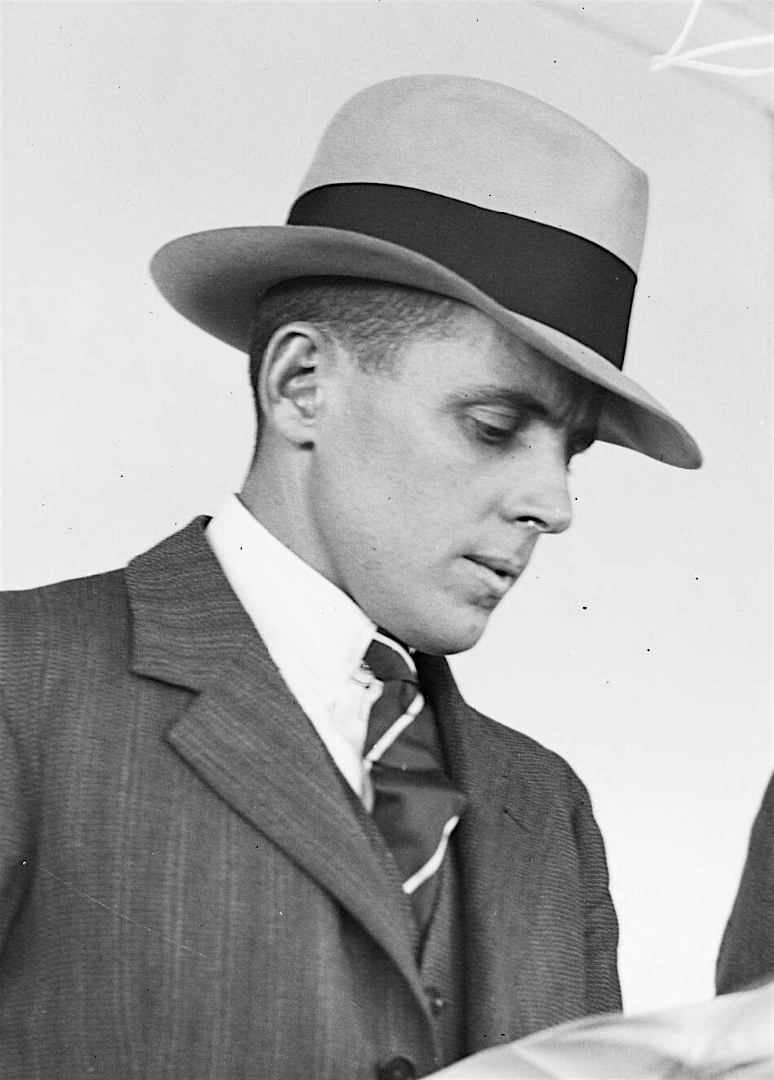

Personal information
- Full name: George Copeland Grant
- Born: 9 May 1907; Port of Spain, Trinidad and Tobago
- Died: 26 October 1978 (aged 71); Cambridge, England
- Nickname: Jack, Jackie
- Batting: Right-handed
- Bowling: Right-arm fast-medium
- Relatives: Fred Grant (brother); Lindsay Grant (brother); Rolph Grant (brother); Fraser Russell (father-in-law)

International information
- National side: West Indies
- Test debut (cap 31): 12 December 1930 v Australia
- Last Test: 14 March 1935 v England

Domestic team information
- Years: Team
- 1928–1930: Cambridge University
- 1931/32: Rhodesia
- 1933/34–1934/35: Trinidad and Tobago

Career statistics
Competition	Test	First-class
Matches	12	81
Runs scored	413	3,831
Batting average	25.81	32.19
100s/50s	0/3	4/20
Top score	71*	115
Balls bowled	24	1,541
Wickets	0	19
Bowling average	–	51.00
5 wickets in innings	–	0
10 wickets in match	–	0
Best bowling	–	3/24
Catches/stumpings	10/–	71/–
- Source: Cricinfo, 30 May 2019

George Copeland "Jackie" Grant (9 May 1907 – 26 October 1978) was a West Indian cricketer who captained the West Indies in Test cricket between 1930 and 1935. He was later a missionary in South Africa and Rhodesia.

Appointed to the Test captaincy at the age of 23, Grant led the West Indies team on its first tour of Australia in 1930–31, and later to its first series victory, when it beat England in 1934–35.

Grant went on to be a teacher in Southern Rhodesia, Trinidad and Tobago and Grenada, and inspector of schools in Zanzibar. From 1949 to 1956 he was the principal of the mission school Adams College near Durban, until the school was forcibly closed as part of the apartheid punitive education laws. He then undertook missionary work in Rhodesia, concentrating on the education and welfare of black Africans, until the Ian Smith government refused him permission to return to the country in 1975.

== Early life and studies ==
George Copeland Grant was born in Port of Spain, Trinidad and Tobago. His grandfather, Kenneth James Grant, was a Canadian Presbyterian missionary who lived in Trinidad from 1870 to 1907. Kenneth James Grant's son, Thomas Geddes Grant (born in Canada in 1866), founded a trading company, T. Geddes Grant, in Trinidad in 1901, and later discovered oil on a cocoa estate he had bought. He and his wife Christina had seven boys and three girls. George and his twin sister Janet (who were always known in the family as Jack and Jill) were the eighth and ninth children; Rolph was the tenth. Like all his brothers, George was educated at Queen's Royal College in Port of Spain. He captained the school's cricket and soccer teams, and because of his cricket ability he was sent to Christ's College, Cambridge, unlike his older brothers and sisters, who had studied at Canadian universities.

Grant attended Cambridge from 1926 to 1930 to study History and qualify as a teacher, with the intention of returning to Queen's Royal College to teach. He played first-class cricket for the university, and gained Blues in cricket and soccer. He also met a fellow student, Ida Russell from Southern Rhodesia, daughter of Sir Fraser Russell, and they became engaged at Cambridge and later married.

== Cricket career ==
A middle-order batsman and occasional fast-medium bowler, Grant played one first-class match for Cambridge University in 1928, then established himself in the side in 1929, scoring 691 runs in 14 matches at an average of 31.40. He improved on this record in 1930, when he scored 716 runs in 11 matches at an average of 44.75, including his first century, 100 against Sussex.

In 1930, while in his final months at Cambridge, Grant was offered the captaincy of the West Indies Test team on its tour of Australia in 1930–31. This was an unusual appointment, as not only had he not played Test cricket, he had never played first-class cricket in the West Indies. He said: "I was younger than all of the sixteen players, save three; and most of these sixteen had already played for the West Indies, and I had not. Yet I was the captain. It could not be disputed that my white colour was a major factor in my being given the post." At the time the West Indian authorities considered it essential that the Test team be led by a white man, despite the fact that the top players were black, such as George Headley and Learie Constantine.

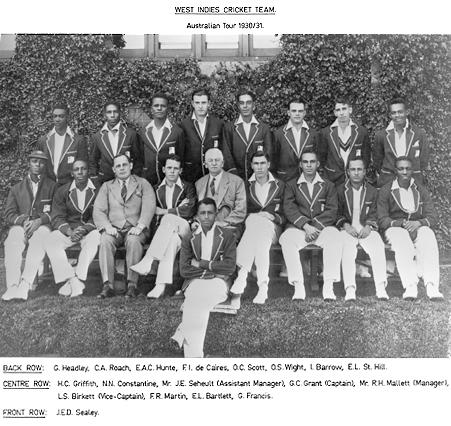
The 1930-31 West Indies team. Grant is in the middle, sitting between the older team management.

The tour of Australia was not a success, the West Indies losing the first four Tests easily. They regained some pride in the Fifth Test, when Grant's two well-timed declarations put Australia under pressure on a difficult pitch and the West Indies won in a close finish by 30 runs. Despite their modest results, the West Indians were popular in Australia, wrote the Australian cricket historian A. G. Moyes, because they "played cricket as though it was great fun – seriously enough but with gaiety mixed with gravity". Grant led the team's Test batting averages with 255 runs at 42.30, including 53 not out and 71 not out in the Second Test. He was the first player in Test cricket to score two unbeaten fifties in the same match.

While teaching in Southern Rhodesia, Grant played for Rhodesia in the 1931-32 Currie Cup under the captaincy of Hamish Campbell-Rodger, helping the team to finish a close second in the competition. He played his first first-class match in the West Indies in 1932–33, when he led one of the sides in a match to help select the team to tour England later that year.

The 1933 tour of England was another unsuccessful tour. Of the three Tests England won two and the other was drawn. Grant scored 1195 runs in the season at an average of 30.64, with two centuries, including his highest first-class score of 115 against an England XI at the end of the tour when he added 226 for the third wicket with Headley. In the Tests, however, he made only 102 runs in six innings. In the Second Test at Manchester he asked his fastest bowlers, Manny Martindale and Learie Constantine, to use bodyline tactics. The English batsmen were unable to play it confidently – except for the captain, Douglas Jardine, who scored his only Test century and saved the English innings from collapse. Grant said admiringly of Jardine's innings: "Never once did he flinch. Never once did he lose his nerve." Having now seen bodyline in action, Grant did not use it again.

Grant's last Test series was the English tour of 1934-35. West Indies won this series two to one with one Test drawn. In the First Test, on a rain-affected pitch where all the batsmen struggled, Grant declared the second innings at 51 for 6, setting England 73 to win in the hope that the state of the pitch would defeat the English team, but they won with six wickets down after being 48 for 6. West Indies won the Second and Fourth Tests, thus winning a series for the first time. When Grant had to leave the field with an injury late in the Fourth Test he asked Constantine to captain the side in his absence, and Constantine led the team to victory.

Despite this success, Grant retired from international cricket after the series, aged 27. He decided that there were things he wanted to do with his life that a continuing involvement in Test cricket would not allow him to do: "For to me cricket was a game, not my life. Also it was not my profession. Therefore, in conscience, I could not give it the priority that others did and also expected me to do."

At the same time as his cricket career Grant also played soccer for Trinidad and Tobago.

== Teaching career ==
Grant began his teaching career in Southern Rhodesia in 1931. He taught for two terms at Plumtree School and then briefly at Milton High School before accepting the offer of a position at his old school, Queen's Royal College. Before leaving Southern Rhodesia, he and Ida – who was also teaching, at the Hope Fountain Mission near Bulawayo – were married in Bulawayo in May 1932. He taught at Queen's Royal College until 1935, when he accepted an offer of the Principalship of Grenada Boys' Secondary School, where he stayed until 1943. He and Ida had three children, two boys and a girl. In 1939 one of the boys died in early childhood of diphtheria.

He worked in Zanzibar for the British Colonial Education Service from 1944 to 1949, including a period as Inspector of Schools, but he and his wife found it difficult to live in a predominantly Muslim country where there was little scope for the kind of Christian work they wanted to do. He accepted an offer of the position of Principalship of Adams College near Durban, where he began work early in 1949.

=== Adams College ===
Between 1933 and 1945 Adams College had become one of the most important schools for black education in South Africa. Cricket had been introduced to the school in the 1930s, and Grant raised the status of the game among the black population around Durban and made Adams College a centre for the sport.

Adams College faced major opposition from the National Party government, especially after the Bantu Education Act came into force. The government wanted black students to be prepared for menial jobs under white bosses, and this was the opposite of what Adams College was trying to achieve. The minister allowed the nearby Inanda Seminary School for girls to operate outside the act, but in 1956, it got to an ultimatum and the staff refused to stop teaching academic and aspirational education. Despite Grant's efforts the government made the college's position impossible, and the school was liquidated.

The school held a service in December 1956 to mark the end of its operation. Grant took a leading role in this service when he paraphrased Hugh Latimer to say: "Be of good comfort, Adams College. We have these years lit such a candle in South Africa as I trust shall never be put out". The school was sold to the government and Grant left South Africa. The government agreed not to use the name Adams College for the school it planned to set up in the college's place. This demise of a leading school was documented by Grant in his book The Liquidation of Adams College, and later in his memoirs. After apartheid ended in the 1990s, the school was restored as Adams College.

== Missionary work ==
Grant and his wife spent a year in Nigeria working for the International Missionary Council, organising an all-Africa Christian conference, which was held in Nigeria in 1958 and led to the formation of the All Africa Conference of Churches. They then returned to Rhodesia to do missionary work. In their work they frequently found themselves at odds with the colonial authorities in their attitudes to the position of blacks in Rhodesian society. Their difficulties increased with the advent in 1965 of the Ian Smith government and its racial policies. In the early 1960s they opened the first private multi-racial school in Rhodesia, in Chikore, about 130 km east of Salisbury. They helped to create and run a charitable organisation called Christian Care to help the families of political detainees – including paying school fees and rent, helping wives visit their husbands in detention camps, and distributing clothing from overseas donations. Eventually, returning to Rhodesia in 1975 after some time abroad, they were refused permission to re-enter the country.

== Retirement ==
After spells teaching at Woodbrooke Selly Oak Colleges in England and the United Church Missionary Residence in Auburndale, Massachusetts, Grant and Ida retired to Cambridge in England. Grant had agreed to be Christian Aid secretary for the Cambridge area, but died suddenly in hospital there before he could begin, aged 71.

Preceded by Karl Nunes	West Indies Test cricket captains 1930-31-1934-35	Succeeded by Rolph Grant
