= 1908–09 Sheffield Shield season =

Australian cricket tournament

1908–09 Sheffield Shield
- Cricket format: First-class
- Tournament format: Double round-robin
- Champions: New South Wales (10th title)
- Participants: 3
- Matches: 6
- Most runs: Vernon Ransford (Victoria) – 720 runs
- Most wickets: Jack O'Connor (South Australia) – 26 wickets

The 1908–09 Sheffield Shield season was the 17th season of the Sheffield Shield, the domestic first-class cricket competition of Australia. New South Wales won the championship.

== Table ==
Team	Pld	W	L	D	Pts
New South Wales	4	3	1	0	2
South Australia	4	2	2	0	0
Victoria	4	1	3	0	-2

== Fixtures ==
7–12 November 1908
Scorecard

Victoria	v	South Australia (H)
219 (73 overs); Hughie Carroll 80; Jack O'Connor 7/92 (29 overs)		496 (151.2 overs); Clem Hill 141; Frank Laver 6/128 (46 overs)
411 (139.4 overs); Vernon Ransford 131; Jack O'Connor 4/150 (55 overs)		8/135 (70 overs); Edgar Mayne 77*; Warwick Armstrong 3/26 (21 overs)

South Australia won by 2 wickets
Adelaide Oval, Adelaide
Umpires: F. J. C. Thomas and Philip Argall

- Victoria won the toss and elected to bat.

18–21 December 1908
Scorecard

New South Wales	v	South Australia (H)
713 (171.3 overs); Bert Hopkins 218; Jack O'Connor 4/173 (54 overs)		97 (40.1 overs); Clem Hill 28; Bert Hopkins 3/31 (14 overs)
		89 f/o (34.4 overs); John Pellew 37; Monty Noble 4/21 (9.4 overs)

New South Wales won by an innings and 527 runs
Adelaide Oval, Adelaide
Umpires: George Watson and Philip Argall

- New South Wales won the toss and elected to bat.

26–29 December 1908
Scorecard

New South Wales	v	Victoria (H)
176 (50.3 overs); Mick Waddy 47; Warwick Armstrong 4/41 (11.3 overs)		369 (118.4 overs); Vernon Ransford 94; Bert Hopkins 4/56 (24.4 overs)
146 (47.2 overs); Charlie Macartney 39*; Les Vernon 3/50 (14 overs)

Victoria won by an innings and 47 runs
Melbourne Cricket Ground, Melbourne
Umpires: Bob Crockett and William Hannah

- New South Wales won the toss and elected to bat.

1–7 January 1909
Scorecard

South Australia	v	Victoria (H)
127 (48.4 overs); John Woodford 32; Les Vernon 5/24 (12.4 overs)		346 (123 overs); Vernon Ransford 171*; Bill Whitty 3/71 (33 overs)
351 (121.4 overs); Edgar Mayne 142; Gerry Hazlitt 5/80 (28 overs)		117 (57 overs); Vernon Ransford 30; Jack O'Connor 7/36 (24 overs)

South Australia won by 15 runs
Melbourne Cricket Ground, Melbourne
Umpires: Bob Crockett and W. A. Young

- South Australia won the toss and elected to bat.

9–12 January 1909
Scorecard

South Australia	v	New South Wales (H)
272 (64.2 overs); Algy Gehrs 102; Charlie Kelleway 4/33 (10.2 overs)		447 (119.4 overs); Warren Bardsley 119; Albert Wright 3/124 (39.4 overs)
192 (46.5 overs); Charlie Dolling 78; Tibby Cotter 5/65 (14.5 overs)		1/19 (4 overs); Charles Gorry 9* Clem Hill 1/7 (2 overs)

New South Wales won by 9 wickets
Sydney Cricket Ground, Sydney
Umpires: Alfred Jones and William Curran

- South Australia won the toss and elected to bat.

23–29 January 1909
Scorecard

(H) New South Wales	v	Victoria
815 (193.3 overs); Monty Noble 213; Warwick Armstrong 2/104 (38 overs)		468 (149.2 overs); Vernon Ransford 182; Charles Barnes 6/59 (14.2 overs)
4/141 (50 overs); Monty Noble 69*; Gerry Hazlitt 1/23 (12 overs)		487 f/o (141.5 overs); Warwick Armstrong 171; Charles Barnes 5/147 (33.5 overs)

New South Wales won by 6 wickets
Sydney Cricket Ground, Sydney
Umpires: Alfred Jones and William Bruton

- New South Wales won the toss and elected to bat.

== Statistics ==
=== Most Runs ===
Vernon Ransford 720

=== Most Wickets ===
Jack O'Connor 26
