= 1906–07 Sheffield Shield season =

Australian cricket tournament

1906–07 Sheffield Shield
- Cricket format: First-class
- Tournament format: Double round-robin
- Champions: New South Wales (9th title)
- Participants: 3
- Matches: 6
- Most runs: Austin Diamond (New South Wales) – 451 runs
- Most wickets: Albert Wright (South Australia) – 25 wickets

The 1906–07 Sheffield Shield season was the 15th season of the Sheffield Shield, the domestic first-class cricket competition of Australia. New South Wales won the championship.

== Table ==
Team	Pld	W	L	D	Pts
New South Wales	4	4	0	0	4
South Australia	4	1	3	0	-2
Victoria	4	1	3	0	-2

== Fixtures ==
10–14 November 1906
Scorecard

Victoria	v	South Australia (H)
125 (60 overs); Peter McAlister 39; Arthur McBeath 4/41 (27 overs)		221 (60.2 overs); Joe Darling 77; Jack Saunders 5/83 (23 overs)
352 (115 overs); Hughie Carroll 112; Jack O'Connor 5/93 (37 overs)		186 (59.5 overs); Clem Hill 71; Jack Saunders 5/60 (21 overs)

Victoria won by 70 runs
Adelaide Oval, Adelaide
Umpires: Philip Argall and T. A. Reeves

- Victoria won the toss and elected to bat.

15–18 December 1906
Scorecard

New South Wales	v	South Australia (H)
349 (99.3 overs); Bert Hopkins 120*; Albert Wright 6/91 (25 overs)		61 (33.1 overs); John Pellew 21; Charlie Macartney 5/18 (16 overs)
		179 f/o (61 overs); Clem Hill 65; Tibby Cotter 3/57 (19 overs)

New South Wales won by an innings and 109 runs
Adelaide Oval, Adelaide
Umpires: George Watson and Philip Argall

- New South Wales won the toss and elected to bat.

24–27 December 1906
Scorecard

(H) Victoria	v	New South Wales
159 (51.1 overs); Frederick Vaughan 34; Monty Noble 4/55 (18 overs)		313 (91.3 overs); Bert Hopkins 63; Warwick Armstrong 6/66 (28.3 overs)
339 (104.4 overs); Warwick Armstrong 168*; Leonard Garnsey 3/87 (20 overs)		8/187 (44 overs); Austin Diamond 62; Tom Warne 6/50 (9 overs)

New South Wales won by 2 wickets
Melbourne Cricket Ground, Melbourne
Umpires: Bob Crockett and Dave Elder

- Victoria won the toss and elected to bat.

29 December 1906 – 2 January 1907
Scorecard

South Australia	v	Victoria (H)
290 (77.3 overs); Algy Gehrs 75; Jack Saunders 5/97 (26 overs)		199 (65.3 overs); Hughie Carroll 64; Jack O'Connor 4/72 (24 overs)
398 (109.4 overs); Charlie Dolling 93; Gerry Hazlitt 4/149 (37 overs)		170 (55.5 overs); Hughie Carroll 85; Albert Wright 5/42 (13 overs)

South Australia won by 319 runs
Melbourne Cricket Ground, Melbourne
Umpires: Bob Crockett and William Hannah

- South Australia won the toss and elected to bat.

4–7 January 1907
Scorecard

South Australia	v	New South Wales (H)
157 (55.2 overs); Claude Jennings 42; Monty Noble 4/35 (11.2 overs)		573 (154.5 overs); Austin Diamond 138; Albert Wright 6/209 (46.5 overs)
248 (79 overs); Claude Jennings 45; Tibby Cotter 4/76 (20 overs)

New South Wales won by an innings and 168 runs
Sydney Cricket Ground, Sydney
Umpires: A. Lucas and James Laing

- South Australia won the toss and elected to bat.

25–28 January 1907
Scorecard

(H) New South Wales	v	Victoria
491 (129.5 overs); Austin Diamond 210*; Warwick Armstrong 4/116 (36.5 overs)		194 (58.1 overs); Warwick Armstrong 111; Tibby Cotter 3/37 (15 overs)
		31 f/o (20.5 overs); Hughie Carroll 8 Monty Noble 6/21 (10.5 overs)

New South Wales won by an innings and 266 runs
Sydney Cricket Ground, Sydney
Umpires: James Laing and William Bruton

- New South Wales won the toss and elected to bat.

== Statistics ==
=== Most Runs ===
Austin Diamond 451

=== Most Wickets ===
Albert Wright 25
