= 1905–06 Sheffield Shield season =

Australian cricket tournament

1905–06 Sheffield Shield
- Cricket format: First-class
- Tournament format: Double round-robin
- Champions: New South Wales (8th title)
- Participants: 3
- Matches: 6
- Most runs: James Mackay (New South Wales) – 559 runs
- Most wickets: Jack Saunders (Victoria) – 27 wickets

The 1905–06 Sheffield Shield season was the 14th season of the Sheffield Shield, the domestic first-class cricket competition of Australia. New South Wales won the championship.

== Table ==
Team	Pld	W	L	D	Pts
New South Wales	4	4	0	0	4
Victoria	4	1	3	0	-2
South Australia	4	1	3	0	-2

== Fixtures ==
11–15 November 1905
Scorecard

(H) South Australia	v	Victoria
244 (85.2 overs); John Pellew 87; Jack Saunders 5/76 (29.2 overs)		526 (184.1 overs); Warwick Armstrong 165; Jack Reedman 4/111 (46.1 overs)
134 (37.3 overs); Joe Darling 36; Jack Saunders 4/46 (19 overs)

Victoria won by an innings and 148 runs
Adelaide Oval, Adelaide
Umpires: Philip Argall and T. A. Reeves

- South Australia won the toss and elected to bat.

15–18 December 1905
Scorecard

(H) South Australia	v	New South Wales
359 (99.1 overs); Clem Hill 146; Monty Noble 3/65 (22.1 overs)		556 (143.2 overs); Austin Diamond 164; Albert Wright 5/150 (40.2 overs)
115 (31.2 overs); Algy Gehrs 33*; Leonard Garnsey 6/48 (15.2 overs)

New South Wales won by an innings and 82 runs
Adelaide Oval, Adelaide
Umpires: Philip Argall and T. A. Reeves

- South Australia won the toss and elected to bat.

23–28 December 1905
Scorecard

(H) Victoria	v	New South Wales
367 (111 overs); Tom Warne 115; Tibby Cotter 3/78 (29 overs)		805 (215.3 overs); Monty Noble 281; Frank Laver 2/184 (52.3 overs)
185 (49.2 overs); Tom Warne 56; Tibby Cotter 3/56 (17 overs)

New South Wales won by an innings and 253 runs
Melbourne Cricket Ground, Melbourne
Umpires: Bob Crockett and William Hannah

- Victoria won the toss and elected to bat.

30 December 1905 – 4 January 1906
Scorecard

South Australia	v	Victoria (H)
181 (79.5 overs); Norman Claxton 67; Warwick Armstrong 4/26 (23.5 overs)		183 (77.2 overs); Barlow Carkeek 52; Albert Wright 7/66 (24.2 overs)
378 (150.3 overs); Norman Claxton 199*; Warwick Armstrong 4/82 (49 overs)		256 (87.4 overs); Warwick Armstrong 64; Joe Travers 3/34 (12.4 overs)

South Australia won by 120 runs
Melbourne Cricket Ground, Melbourne
Umpires: Bob Crockett and William Bruton

- South Australia won the toss and elected to bat.

6–10 January 1906
Scorecard

South Australia	v	New South Wales (H)
257 (81.5 overs); Algy Gehrs 101; Leonard Garnsey 4/70 (20.5 overs)		269 (87.1 overs); James Mackay 105; Norman Claxton 4/44 (20 overs)
188 (96.2 overs); Charlie Dolling 83*; Tibby Cotter 3/47 (29 overs)		1/177 (38 overs); James Mackay 102*; Jack Reedman 1/48 (9 overs)

New South Wales won by 9 wickets
Sydney Cricket Ground, Sydney
Umpires: James Laing and William Curran

- South Australia won the toss and elected to bat.

26–30 January 1906
Scorecard

(H) New South Wales	v	Victoria
263 (51.4 overs); Victor Trumper 101; Jack Saunders 7/122 (25 overs)		215 (81.3 overs); Peter McAlister 53; Tibby Cotter 5/83 (27 overs)
394 (92 overs); Monty Noble 123; Jack Saunders 5/140 (32 overs)		297 (101.2 overs); Peter McAlister 128; Tibby Cotter 4/64 (28.2 overs)

New South Wales won by 145 runs
Sydney Cricket Ground, Sydney
Umpires: Richard Callaway and William Curran

- New South Wales won the toss and elected to bat.

== Statistics ==
=== Most Runs ===
James Mackay 559

=== Most Wickets ===
Jack Saunders 27
