= 1907–08 Sheffield Shield season =

Australian cricket tournament

1907–08 Sheffield Shield
- Cricket format: First-class
- Tournament format: Double round-robin
- Champions: Victoria (6th title)
- Participants: 3
- Matches: 4
- Most runs: Monty Noble (New South Wales) – 585 runs
- Most wickets: Jack Saunders (Victoria) – 20 wickets

The 1907–08 Sheffield Shield season was the 16th season of the Sheffield Shield, the domestic first-class cricket competition of Australia. Victoria won the championship but only four matches took place because South Australia did not play their home matches.

== Table ==
| Team | Pld | W | L | D | Pts |
|---|---|---|---|---|---|
| Victoria | 3 | 2 | 1 | 0 | 1 |
| South Australia | 2 | 1 | 1 | 0 | 0 |
| New South Wales | 3 | 1 | 2 | 0 | -1 |

== Fixtures ==
29 November – 3 December 1907
Scorecard

| (H) Victoria | v | South Australia |
| 699 (218.5 overs); Warwick Armstrong 231; Jack O'Connor 6/249 (83 overs) | | 357 (113.2 overs); Edgar Mayne 75; Jack Saunders 4/92 (36 overs) |
| | | 177 f/o (63.2 overs); Les Hill 58; Gerry Hazlitt 4/54 (15.2 overs) |

Victoria won by an innings and 165 runs
Melbourne Cricket Ground, Melbourne
Umpires: Bob Crockett and William Hannah

- Victoria won the toss and elected to bat.

6–12 December 1907
Scorecard

| South Australia | v | New South Wales (H) |
| 349 (97 overs); Clem Hill 92; Harry Whiddon 4/73 (20 overs) | | 276 (87.1 overs); Monty Noble 93; Les Hill 5/82 (21 overs) |
| 519 (167.5 overs); Charlie Dolling 113; Harry Whiddon 4/140 (38 overs) | | 572 (155.3 overs); Victor Trumper 135; Jack O'Connor 5/172 (57 overs) |

South Australia won by 20 runs
Sydney Cricket Ground, Sydney
Umpires: James Laing and William Bruton

- South Australia won the toss and elected to bat.

26–31 December 1907
Scorecard

| (H) Victoria | v | New South Wales |
| 232 (86.3 overs); Peter McAlister 72; Charlie Macartney 3/62 (23 overs) | | 207 (60 overs); Monty Noble 101; Jack Saunders 5/51 (24 overs) |
| 141 (49.2 overs); Frank Tarrant 46; Tibby Cotter 5/52 (17.2 overs) | | 2/168 (44 overs); Victor Trumper 119; Jack Saunders 1/54 (16 overs) |

New South Wales won by 8 wickets
Melbourne Cricket Ground, Melbourne
Umpires: Bob Crockett and W. A. Young

- Victoria won the toss and elected to bat.

24–31 January 1908
Scorecard

| Victoria | v | New South Wales (H) |
| 402 (118 overs); Warwick Armstrong 110; Monty Noble 3/54 (20 overs) | | 461 (142.4 overs); Syd Gregory 201; Les Vernon 4/87 (21.4 overs) |
| 511 (169.2 overs); Frank Tarrant 206; Francis Johnson 2/96 (40 overs) | | 241 (79.2 overs); Monty Noble 123; Jack Saunders 6/61 (21.2 overs) |

Victoria won by 211 runs
Sydney Cricket Ground, Sydney
Umpires: James Laing and William Bruton

- Victoria won the toss and elected to bat.

== Statistics ==
=== Most Runs ===
Monty Noble 585

=== Most Wickets ===
Jack Saunders 20
