= 1904–05 Sheffield Shield season =

Australian cricket tournament

1904–05 Sheffield Shield
- Cricket format: First-class
- Tournament format: Double round-robin
- Champions: New South Wales (7th title)
- Participants: 3
- Matches: 6
- Most runs: Monty Noble (New South Wales) – 373 runs
- Most wickets: Jack Reedman (South Australia) – 19 wickets

The 1904–05 Sheffield Shield season was the 13th season of the Sheffield Shield, the domestic first-class cricket competition of Australia. New South Wales won the championship.

== Table ==
Team	Pld	W	L	D	Pts
New South Wales	4	4	0	0	4
Victoria	4	1	3	0	-2
South Australia	4	1	3	0	-2

== Fixtures ==
12–16 November 1904
Scorecard

(H) South Australia	v	Victoria
247 (101.3 overs); Clem Hill 111*; Frederick Collins 5/50 (24.3 overs)		437 (162.5 overs); Frank Laver 164; Norman Claxton 5/130 (60 overs)
210 (66.2 overs); Clem Hill 67; Frank Laver 4/31 (12 overs)		1/21 (5 overs); William Scott 13*; Clem Hill 1/3 (2 overs)

Victoria won by 9 wickets
Adelaide Oval, Adelaide
Umpires: Philip Argall and T. A. Reeves

- South Australia won the toss and elected to bat.

17–20 December 1904
Scorecard

New South Wales	v	South Australia (H)
465 (133.4 overs); Mick Waddy 129*; Robert Cowan 4/104 (24 overs)		177 (62.1 overs); Joe Darling 67; Monty Noble 5/51 (22.1 overs)
		168 f/o (60.3 overs); Algy Gehrs 37; Bert Hopkins 4/34 (22 overs)

New South Wales won by an innings and 120 runs
Adelaide Oval, Adelaide
Umpires: George Watson and Philip Argall

- New South Wales won the toss and elected to bat.

24–28 December 1904
Scorecard

New South Wales	v	Victoria (H)
213 (66.1 overs); Monty Noble 85; Charlie McLeod 4/42 (17 overs)		213 (64.4 overs); John Stuckey 73; Francis Johnson 4/70 (20.4 overs)
480 (131.3 overs); Monty Noble 70; Frederick Collins 5/103 (27.3 overs)		345 (121.2 overs); John Stuckey 75; Francis Johnson 3/64 (27 overs)

New South Wales won by 135 runs
Melbourne Cricket Ground, Melbourne
Umpires: Bob Crockett and E. Barrass

- New South Wales won the toss and elected to bat.

31 December 1904 – 4 January 1905
Scorecard

(H) Victoria	v	South Australia
420 (133.2 overs); Algy Gehrs 170; Jack Saunders 4/108 (37 overs)		129 (59.2 overs); Frank Laver 41; Jack Reedman 7/54 (30.2 overs)
		219 f/o (76.4 overs); Warwick Armstrong 85; Jack Reedman 6/95 (29.4 overs)

South Australia won by an innings and 72 runs
Melbourne Cricket Ground, Melbourne
Umpires: Bob Crockett and William Bruton

- South Australia won the toss and elected to bat.

6–9 January 1905
Scorecard

South Australia	v	New South Wales (H)
281 (77.3 overs); John Pellew 68; Bert Hopkins 4/58 (18.3 overs)		299 (87.4 overs); Reggie Duff 80; Joe Travers 6/102 (32.4 overs)
185 (54.4 overs); John Pellew 53; Tibby Cotter 7/77 (19 overs)		3/170 (39.5 overs); Victor Trumper 76; Robert Cowan 1/28 (6 overs)

New South Wales won by 7 wickets
Sydney Cricket Ground, Sydney
Umpires: James Laing and William Curran

- South Australia won the toss and elected to bat.

27 January – 1 February 1905
Scorecard

(H) New South Wales	v	Victoria
421 (107.5 overs); Victor Trumper 81; Warwick Armstrong 2/95 (33 overs)		345 (118.1 overs); James Giller 125; Tibby Cotter 5/83 (29 overs)
255 (74.2 overs); Monty Noble 112; Warwick Armstrong 4/57 (26.2 overs)		132 (46.3 overs); Barlow Carkeek 46; Bert Hopkins 4/14 (7.3 overs)

New South Wales won by 199 runs
Sydney Cricket Ground, Sydney
Umpires: James Laing and William Curran

- New South Wales won the toss and elected to bat.

== Statistics ==
=== Most Runs ===
Monty Noble 373

=== Most Wickets ===
Jack Reedman 19
