= English cricket team in Australia in 1907–08 =

International cricket tour

The English cricket team in Australia in 1907–08 lost the Test series, and with it the Ashes, 4–1. They were handicapped by Arthur Jones, their captain, having to miss the first three Tests through illness. Frederick Fane led the side during Jones' absence.

George Gunn, in Australia for the good of his health, was called into the touring party to bolster the batting and was a great success, scoring two hundreds including one on his Test debut, and scoring 462 runs at an average of 51.33. Nevertheless, England's batting was fragile throughout the series, with only Kenneth Hutchings scoring a hundred in addition to Gunn. Jack Hobbs made his England debut in the second Test, the only one which England won, scoring 83 and 28, and he had the next best average to Gunn. The bowling relied on Jack Crawford, Arthur Fielder and Sydney Barnes, who took 79 wickets between them.

Australia's batting was much superior to England's, with eight players averaging over 30 to England's three. Warwick Armstrong topped their batting averages, with 410 runs at 45.55. Jack Saunders took 31 wickets at 23.09, and five other bowlers contributed usefully, with between 10 and 14 wickets at an average of between 25 and 31.

England lost the first Test by only two wickets, and ought to have won the third. In the latter match, Clem Hill—coming in at number 9 in Australia's second innings because of an attack of influenza—made 160. He added 243 for the eighth wicket with "Roger" Hartigan (116), their partnership turning the match.

The tour was organised by the Marylebone Cricket Club and matches outside the Tests were played under the MCC name.

== Test series summary ==
Match length: Timeless. Balls per over: 6. Series result: Australia won 4–1.

=== First Test ===
13–19 December 1907
(Timeless Test)
Scorecard

England	v	Australia
273 (76.5 overs); G Gunn 119; A Cotter 6/101 (21.5 overs)		300 (91.2 overs); C Hill 87; A Fielder 6/82 (30.2 overs)
300 (109 overs); G Gunn 74; JV Saunders 74		275/8 (98.3 overs); H Carter 61; A Fielder 3/88 (27.3 overs)

Australia won by 2 wickets
Sydney Cricket Ground, Sydney
Umpires: RM Crockett and W Hannah

- England won the toss and elected to bat.
- 15 December was taken as a rest day
- There was no play on the fifth day
- RA Young, G Gunn, KL Hutchings and J Hardstaff (all ENG), and VS Ransford, CG Macartney, H Carter and GR Hazlitt (all AUS) made their Test debuts.

=== Second Test ===
1–7 January 1908
(Timeless Test)
Scorecard

Australia	v	England
266 (100.5 overs); MA Noble 61; JN Crawford 5/79 (29 overs)		382 (135.2 overs); KL Hutchings 126; A Cotter 5/142 (33 overs)
397 (121.4 overs); WW Armstrong 77; SF Barnes 5/72 (27.4 overs)		282/9 (121.4 overs); FL Fane 50; WW Armstrong 3/53 (30.4 overs)

England won by 1 wicket
Melbourne Cricket Ground, Melbourne
Umpires: P Argall and RM Crockett

- Australia won the toss and elected to bat.
- 5 January was taken as a rest day
- JB Hobbs and J Humphries (both ENG) made their Test debuts.

=== Third Test ===
10–16 January 1908
(Timeless Test)
Scorecard

Australia	v	England
285 (94.5 overs); CG Macartney 75; A Fielder 4/80 (27.5 overs)		363 (132 overs); G Gunn 65; JDA O’Connor 3/110 (40 overs)
506 (167.5 overs); C Hill 160; SF Barnes 3/83 (42 overs)		183 (63.4 overs); J Hardstaff 72; JDA O’Connor 5/40 (21 overs)

Australia won by 245 runs
Adelaide Oval, Adelaide
Umpires: RM Crockett and J Laing

- Australia won the toss and elected to bat.
- 12 January was taken as a rest day
- MJ Hartigan and JDA O’Connor (both AUS) made their Test debuts.

=== Fourth Test ===
7–11 February 1908
(Timeless Test)
Scorecard

Australia	v	England
214 (85.5 overs); VS Ransford 51; JN Crawford 5/48 (23.5 overs)		105 (34.2 overs); JB Hobbs 57; JV Saunders 5/28 (15.2 overs)
385 (124 overs); WW Armstrong 133*; A Fielder 4/91 (31 overs)		186 (68.1 overs); G Gunn 43; JV Saunders 4/76 (26 overs)

Australia won by 308 runs
Melbourne Cricket Ground, Melbourne
Umpires: P Argall and RM Crockett

- Australia won the toss and elected to bat.
- 9 February was taken as a rest day

=== Fifth Test ===
21–27 February 1908
(Timeless Test)
Scorecard

Australia	v	England
137 (50.4 overs); SE Gregory 44; SF Barnes 7/60 (22.4 overs)		281 (96.1 overs); G Gunn 122*; CG Macartney 3/44 (15.1 overs)
422 (127.4 overs); VT Trumper 166; JN Crawford 5/141 (36 overs)		229 (105.1 overs); W Rhodes 69; JV Saunders 5/82 (35.1 overs)

Australia won by 49 runs
Sydney Cricket Ground, Sydney
Umpires: W Hannah and AC Jones

- England won the toss and elected to field.
- 23 February was taken as a rest day
