= 1898–99 Sheffield Shield season =

Australian cricket tournament

1898–99 Sheffield Shield
- Cricket format: First-class
- Tournament format: Double round-robin
- Champions: Victoria (4th title)
- Participants: 3
- Matches: 6
- Most runs: Clem Hill (South Australia) – 502 runs
- Most wickets: Hugh Trumble (Victoria) – 34 wickets

The 1898–99 Sheffield Shield season was the seventh season of the Sheffield Shield, the domestic first-class cricket competition of Australia. Victoria won the championship.

== Table ==
Team	Pld	W	L	D
Victoria	4	3	1	0
New South Wales	4	2	2	0
South Australia	4	1	3	0

== Fixtures ==
12–17 November 1898
Scorecard

Victoria	v	South Australia (H)
507 (197.1 overs); John Stuckey 134; Ernie Jones 5/192 (70 overs)		330 (113 overs); Clem Hill 86; Hugh Trumble 8/129 (49 overs)
217 (92 overs); William Bruce 73; Ernie Jones 4/67 (32 overs)		98 (47.2 overs); John McKenzie 25*; James Giller 7/51 (21 overs)

Victoria won by 296 runs
Adelaide Oval, Adelaide
Umpires: Bob Crockett and Philip Argall

- Victoria won the toss and elected to bat.

16–21 December 1898
Scorecard

(H) South Australia	v	New South Wales
334 (87.5 overs); Ernie Jones 82; Monty Noble 6/129 (37 overs)		374 (154.4 overs); Harry Donnan 160*; George Giffen 4/111 (39.4 overs)
269 (83.3 overs); Clem Hill 109; Bill Howell 6/116 (39.3 overs)		172 (66.4 overs); Frank Iredale 55; George Giffen 6/83 (33 overs)

South Australia won by 57 runs
Adelaide Oval, Adelaide
Umpires: Charles Bannerman and George Downs

- South Australia won the toss and elected to bat.

24–27 December 1898
Scorecard

(H) Victoria	v	New South Wales
189 (65.4 overs); Jack Worrall 109; Bill Howell 5/75 (25.4 overs)		99 (56.3 overs); Monty Noble 34*; Charlie McLeod 6/42 (25 overs)
219 (123 overs); Harry Graham 45; Tom McKibbin 3/29 (24 overs)		119 (51.1 overs); Syd Gregory 51; Hugh Trumble 8/58 (25.1 overs)

Victoria won by 190 runs
Melbourne Cricket Ground, Melbourne
Umpires: Bob Crockett and Charles Bannerman

- New South Wales won the toss and elected to field.

31 December 1898 – 3 January 1899
Scorecard

(H) Victoria	v	South Australia
455 (133.3 overs); Frank Laver 137*; Ernie Jones 4/138 (49 overs)		136 (65.1 overs); Joe Darling 62; Charlie McLeod 6/37 (30.1 overs)
		101 f/o (51.1 overs); Clem Hill 33; Hugh Trumble 8/39 (26 overs)

Victoria won by an innings and 218 runs
Melbourne Cricket Ground, Melbourne
Umpires: Bob Crockett and Philip Argall

- Victoria won the toss and elected to bat.

6–11 January 1899
Scorecard

(H) New South Wales	v	South Australia
379 (90.5 overs); Syd Gregory 89; Ernie Jones 6/154 (36.5 overs)		164 (55.5 overs); Jack Lyons 41; Tom McKibbin 5/54 (17 overs)
7/256 (66.3 overs); Monty Noble 101; Ernie Jones 3/69 (30.3 overs)		469 f/o (158.4 overs); Clem Hill 159; Tom McKibbin 5/168 (44.4 overs)

New South Wales won by 3 wickets
Sydney Cricket Ground, Sydney
Umpires: Charles Bannerman and Philip Argall

- New South Wales won the toss and elected to bat.

26–30 January 1899
Scorecard

(H) New South Wales	v	Victoria
442 (151.2 overs); Monty Noble 100; Charlie McLeod 6/138 (53.2 overs)		215 (90.5 overs); James Giller 87; Bill Howell 3/23 (19.5 overs)
2/170 (57 overs); Alick Mackenzie 62*; Frank Laver 1/41 (14 overs)		396 f/o (139.5 overs); Harry Graham 124; Monty Noble 5/128 (41.5 overs)

New South Wales won by 8 wickets
Sydney Cricket Ground, Sydney
Umpires: Bob Crockett and Charles Bannerman

- New South Wales won the toss and elected to bat.

== Statistics ==
=== Most Runs ===
Clem Hill 502

=== Most Wickets ===
Hugh Trumble 34
