= Dolling =

Dolling or Dölling is a surname. Notable people with the surname include:

- Alison Dolling (1917–2006), Australian writer
- Charlie Dolling (1886–1936), Australian doctor, cricketer and cricket administrator
- Dorothy Eleanor Dolling (1897–1967), New Zealand born Australian community worker
- Emmi Dölling (1906–1990), Czechoslovak/German political activist and journalist
- Hazel Dolling (1923/24–2006), British chatelaine
- Irene Dölling (born 1942), German sociologist
- Iwo Dölling (1923–2019), Swedish diplomat
- Peter Dolling (born 1941), Australian rules footballer
- Robert Dolling (1851–1902), British Anglo-Catholic Anglican priest
