= 1909 in sports =

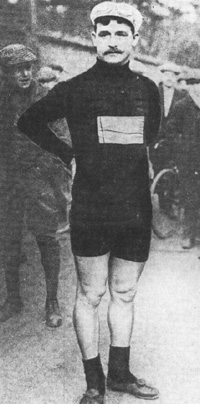
François Faber of Luxembourg won the 1909 Tour de France

1909 in sports describes the year's events in world sport.

== American football ==
College championship

- College football national championship – Yale Bulldogs

== Association football ==
International football

- West Auckland Town, an English amateur team, defeats FC Winterthur of Switzerland 2–0 to win the Sir Thomas Lipton Trophy, one of the earliest international club competitions

Brazil

- 4 April — Sport Club Internacional is founded in Porto Alegre
- 12 October - Coritiba Foot Ball Club is founded in Curitiba

England

- The Football League – Newcastle United 53 points, Everton 46, Sunderland 44, Blackburn Rovers 41, The Wednesday 40, Woolwich Arsenal 38
- FA Cup final – Manchester United 1–0 Bristol City at Crystal Palace, London

Germany

- National Championship – Phönix Karlsruhe 4–2 Viktoria Berlin at Breslau

Hungary

- Budapest Honvéd FC founded on August 3.

Romania

- Formation of the Romanian Football Federation (Federaţia Română de Fotbal or FRF)

Scotland

- Scottish Football League – Celtic
- Scottish Cup final – competition cancelled following a riot at a replay between Rangers and Celtic; the first match was drawn 2–2 and the replay ended 1–1

Spain

- Formation of the Royal Spanish Football Federation (Real Federación Española de Fútbol or RFEF). It is originally known as the Federación Española de Clubs de Football.
- Real Sociedad was founded in San Sebastián on September 7.

== Athletics ==
- February 12 - American athlete James Clark runs world record Marathon (2:46:52.6) in New York City at the Brooklyn Marathon
- May 8 - American long-distance runner Albert Raines set a world's best time in the marathon ( 2:46:04) at the Bronx Marathon
- August 23 - Fred ‘Tenby’ Davies (Wales) defeats Bert Day (Ireland) at Pontypridd to become world champion over the half-mile distance run.

== Australian rules football ==
VFL Premiership

- South Melbourne wins the 13th VFL Premiership: South Melbourne 4.14 (38) d Carlton 4.12 (36) at Melbourne Cricket Ground (MCG)

== Bandy ==
Sweden

- Championship final – AIK 7–3 Djurgårdens IF

== Baseball ==
World Series

- 8–16 October — Pittsburgh Pirates (NL) defeats Detroit Tigers (AL) to win the 1909 World Series by 4 games to 3

== Boxing ==
Events

- March 10 - Jack Johnson fights Victor McLaglen to no decision in 6 rounds (Exhibition fight at the Vancouver Athletic Club)
- June 19 — Monte Attell wins the World Bantamweight Championship joining his brother Abe Attell, who holds the World Featherweight Championship, as the first pair of brothers to hold world titles simultaneously.

Lineal world champions

- World Heavyweight Championship – Jack Johnson
- World Light Heavyweight Championship – vacant
- World Middleweight Championship – Stanley Ketchel
- World Welterweight Championship – vacant
- World Lightweight Championship – Battling Nelson
- World Featherweight Championship – Abe Attell
- World Bantamweight Championship – Jimmy Walsh → "Fighting" Jimmy Reagan → Monte Attell

== Canadian football ==
- Interprovincial Rugby Football Union - Ottawa Rough Riders
- Ontario Rugby Football Union - Toronto Parkdale
- Manitoba Rugby Football Union - St John's
- Intercollegiate Rugby Football Union - University of Toronto
- Calgary defeats Edmonton to win the Alberta Rugby Football League
- No matches take place in Saskatchewan this year
- 1st Grey Cup - University of Toronto defeats Toronto Parkdale 26–6
- An exhibition match takes place in New York. Hamilton defeats Ottawa 11–6

== Cricket ==
Events

- 15 June — representatives of England, Australia and South Africa meet at Lord's to form the Imperial Cricket Conference (ICC)

England

- County Championship – Kent
- Minor Counties Championship – Wiltshire
- Most runs – Ernie Hayes 2105 @ 36.29 (HS 276)
- Most wickets – Colin Blythe 215 @ 14.54 (BB 9–42)
- Wisden Cricketers of the Year – Warren Bardsley, Sydney Barnes, Douglas Carr, Arthur Day, Vernon Ransford

Australia

- Sheffield Shield – New South Wales
- Most runs – Vernon Ransford 825 @ 103.12 (HS 182)
- Most wickets – Jack O'Connor 40 @ 23.00 (BB 7–36)

India

- Bombay Triangular – Europeans

New Zealand

- Plunket Shield – Auckland

South Africa

- Currie Cup – not contested

West Indies

- Inter-Colonial Tournament – Barbados

== Cycling ==
Tour de France

- François Faber (Luxembourg) wins the 7th Tour de France

Giro d'Italia

- Luigi Ganna (Italy) wins the inaugural Giro d'Italia

== Eton wall game ==
Events

- 30 November — a goal is scored in the St. Andrew's Day match at Eton College, the last time this has happened in the St. Andrew's Day game (the most important match of the year) though points have been scored by other methods

== Figure skating ==
World Figure Skating Championships

- World Men's Champion – Ulrich Salchow (Sweden)
- World Women's Champion – Lily Kronberger (Hungary)
- World Pairs Champions – Phyllis Johnson and James H. Johnson (Great Britain)

== Golf ==
Major tournaments

- British Open – John Henry Taylor
- U.S. Open – George Sargent

Other tournaments

- British Amateur – Robert Maxwell
- US Amateur – Robert A. Gardner

== Horse racing ==
England

- Grand National – Lutteur III
- 1,000 Guineas Stakes – Electra
- 2,000 Guineas Stakes – Minoru
- The Derby – Minoru
- The Oaks – Perola
- St. Leger Stakes – Bayardo

Australia

- Melbourne Cup – Prince Foote

Canada

- King's Plate – Shimonese

Ireland

- Irish Grand National – Little Hack II
- Irish Derby Stakes – Bachelor's Double

USA

- Kentucky Derby – Wintergreen
- Preakness Stakes – Effendi
- Belmont Stakes – Joe Madden

== Ice hockey ==
Stanley Cup

- March — Ottawa Hockey Club wins the Eastern Canada Hockey Association (ECHA) championship and the Stanley Cup.
- March — Renfrew Creamery Kings win the Federal Hockey League championship and challenge for the Stanley Cup, but cannot play because the Stanley Cup trustees rule their players are ineligible.

Amateur hockey

- February — the Allan Cup is donated to be the amateur championship hockey trophy of Canada
- March — Ottawa Cliffsides win the Inter-Provincial Amateur Hockey Union (IPAHU) and the Allan Cup. The Cliffsides then lose a challenge to Queen's College of Kingston, Ontario.

Professional hockey

- 25 November — Eastern Canada Hockey Association (ECHA) disbands over the plans of the Montreal Wanderers to change rinks. The Wanderers are shut out and the new Canadian Hockey Association (CHA) is formed with the remainder of the ECHA teams. The CHA will disband in January 1910.
- 2 December — The Montreal Wanderers form the National Hockey Association (NHA) with the Renfrew Creamery Kings, Cobalt Silver Kings and Haileybury Comets of the Temiscaming league. The NHA owners also organize a new team Les Canadiens which is the basis of today's Montreal Canadiens. The NHA will absorb Ottawa and the Montreal Shamrocks of the CHA in January 1910.

== Rowing ==
The Boat Race

- 3 April — Oxford wins the 66th Oxford and Cambridge Boat Race

== Rugby league ==
International

- 1909 New Zealand rugby league tour of Australia
- 10 February — Great Britain defeats Australia to claim the first ever Ashes series in the final match of the 1908–09 Kangaroo tour of Great Britain

England

- Championship – Wigan
- Challenge Cup final – Wakefield Trinity 17–0 Hull F.C. at Headingley Rugby Stadium, Leeds
- Lancashire League Championship – Wigan
- Yorkshire League Championship – Halifax
- Lancashire County Cup – Wigan 10–9 Oldham
- Yorkshire County Cup – Halifax 9–5 Hunslet

Australia

- 14 September — NSW Premiership is won by minor premiers South Sydney on a forfeit after Balmain withdraws from the grand final

== Rugby union ==
Home Nations Championship

- 27th Home Nations Championship series is won by Wales
- Wales defeats France in a 1909 non-championship match. It is later retrospectively regarded as a Grand Slam winner.
- October 8 – The first rugby football match to be played at Twickenham Stadium is won by the Harlequins when they defeat Richmond at the brand new ground.

== Speed skating ==
Speed Skating World Championships

- Men's All-round Champion – Oscar Mathisen (Norway)

== Tennis ==
Australia

- Australian Men's Singles Championship – Anthony Wilding (NZ) defeats Ernie Parker (Australia) 6–1 7–5 6–2

England

- Wimbledon Men's Singles Championship – Arthur Gore (GB) defeats Josiah Ritchie (GB) 6–8 1–6 6–2 6–2 6–2
- Wimbledon Women's Singles Championship – Dora Boothby (GB) defeats Agnes Morton (GB) 6–4 4–6 8–6

France

- French Men's Singles Championship – Max Decugis (France) defeats Maurice Germot (France): details unknown
- French Women's Singles Championship – Jeanne Matthey (France) defeats Gallay (France): details unknown

USA

- American Men's Singles Championship – William Larned (USA) defeats William Clothier (USA) 6–1 6–2 5–7 1–6 6–1
- American Women's Singles Championship – Hazel Hotchkiss Wightman (USA) defeats Maud Barger-Wallach (USA) 6–0 6–1

Davis Cup

- 1909 International Lawn Tennis Challenge – Australasia 5–0 United States at Double Bay Grounds (grass) Sydney, Australia
