= Bernard Waddy =

English cricketer, medical doctor and academic

Personal information
- Full name: Bernard Broughton Waddy
- Born: 3 July 1911; Parramatta, New South Wales, Australia
- Died: 7 August 1981 (aged 70); Winchester, Hampshire, England
- Batting: Right-handed
- Bowling: Right-arm medium
- Relatives: Stacy Waddy (father); Mick Waddy (uncle); Gar Waddy (uncle)

Domestic team information
- Years: Team
- 1932: Oxford University
- 1934: Marylebone Cricket Club

Career statistics
Competition	First-class
Matches	4
Runs scored	49
Batting average	8.16
100s/50s	–/–
Top score	26
Balls bowled	438
Wickets	7
Bowling average	29.42
5 wickets in innings	–
10 wickets in match	–
Best bowling	2/11
Catches/stumpings	–/–
- Source: Cricinfo, 13 July 2020

Bernard Broughton Waddy (3 July 1911 – 7 August 1981) was an Australian-born English first-class cricketer, physician and academic.

The son of the cricketer and clergyman Stacy Waddy, he was born at Parramatta in July 1911. He moved to England with his family as a child and was educated at Marlborough College, before going up to Balliol College, Oxford. While studying at Oxford, he played first-class cricket for Oxford University in 1932, making two appearances against Leicestershire and Yorkshire. He scored 11 runs and took 3 wickets for Oxford. Two years later, he toured Ireland with the Marylebone Cricket Club, making two first-class appearances against the Ireland cricket team in Dublin at College Park and Observatory Lane. He scored 38 runs on the tour and took 4 wickets.

After graduating from Oxford, Waddy became a medical doctor, having trained at King's College Hospital. He was a specialist in epidemiology in the Gold Coast, and during the Second World War he was commissioned as a second lieutenant with the African Colonial Force in April 1940. He later served with the Royal Army Medical Corps attachment to the Colonial Force and was promoted to lieutenant in September 1943, antedated to April 1940. Following the war, he moved into lecturing on the subject of tropical diseases and was said to have been interested in "any disease communicable on a large scale". He was a senior lecturer at the London School of Hygiene & Tropical Medicine and also served in the capacity of overseas medical officer for Save the Children. He was also a contributor to the New Scientist magazine.

Waddy died at Winchester in August 1981. His uncles, Mich and Gar Waddy, both played first-class cricket.
