= Leslie Vernon =

Leslie Vernon may refer to:

- Les Vernon (Leslie Phillip Vernon), Australian sportsman
- Leslie Vernon, the main character of the film Behind the Mask: The Rise of Leslie Vernon
- Les Vernon (footballer) (1905–1979), English footballer for Bury, Preston North End and Swansea Town
