= Marcel Burgun =

France international rugby union player (1890-1916)

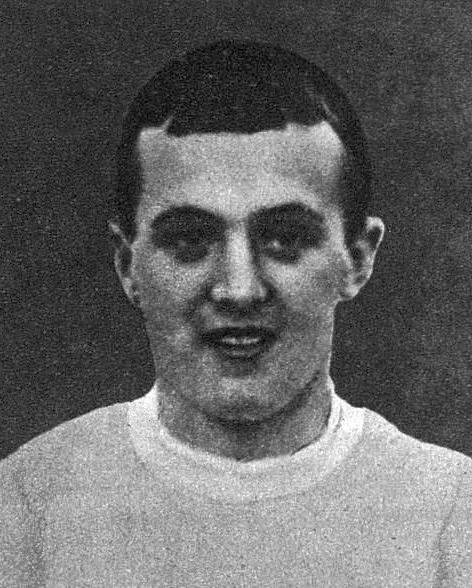
- Born: Marcel Henry Burgun; 30 January 1890 St Petersburg, Russia
- Died: 2 September 1916 (aged 26) Aubérive, France
- Height: 1.73 m (5 ft 8 in)
- Weight: 72 kg (11 st 5 lb)

Rugby union career
Senior career
Years	Team	Apps	(Points)
1912	Racing club de France		
1912-1914	Castres Olympique		
International career
Years	Team	Apps	(Points)
1909-19??	France		

Marcel Henry Burgun was a French rugby union player. He was born on 30 January 1890, in St Petersburg, Russia and died on 2 September 1916 during the First World War. He was 1 m 73 and weighed 72 kg, and played at centre, for France and Racing club de France.

He attended the École centrale Paris and entered the French artillery in 1914, then the nascent French air force in 1915, gaining the rank of "lieutenant ingénieur" and was killed in combat against the Germans. His brother was also killed in the conflict in 1914.

He received three decorations for bravery including a posthumous Croix de Guerre. He is buried in the Mont Frenet, cemetery in the commune de La Cheppe (Marne).

== Career ==
=== Club ===
- SCUF : ?
- Racing club de France : Sporting club universitaire de France 1912
- Castres Olympique: 1912 to 1914

=== International ===
- Marcel Burgun had his first appearance on 20 March 1909 against the Ireland national rugby union team.

== Past ==
=== Club ===
- Vice-champion of France in 1912 (with Racing)

=== International ===
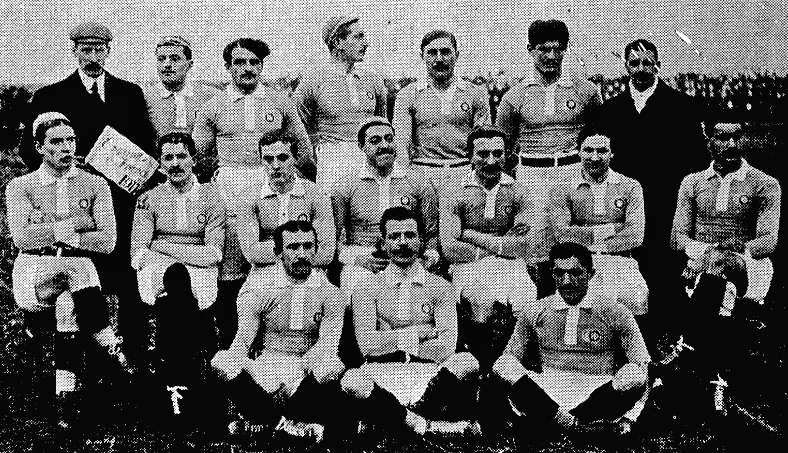
The French team for the England-France match on 28 January 1911. Burgun is seated in the middle, third from the left.

- 11 appearances with the France national rugby union team
  - 1 in 1909, 3 in 1910, 2 in 1911, 2 in 1912, 2 in 1913, and 1 in 1914
- Participation in 5 finales of the Six Nations Championship, and a preliminary match against the Ireland national rugby union team in 1909.
- Played and won against the Scotland national rugby union team in 1911 in Paris.
