= International cricket in 1913 =

International cricket season

The 1913 International cricket season was from April 1913 to August 1913.

== Season overview ==
International tours
Start date	Home team	Away team	Results [Matches]			
Start date	Home team	Away team	Test	ODI	FC	LA
20 June 1913	United States	Australia	—	—	0–4 [5]	—
10 July 1913	Scotland	Ireland	—	—	0–0 [1]	—

== June ==
=== Australia in North America ===
Two-day match series
No.	Date	Home captain	Away captain	Venue	Result
Match 1	20–21 June	Percy Clark	Austin Diamond	Germantown Cricket Club Ground, Manheim	Australia by an innings and 178 runs
Match 2	27–28 June	Percy Clark	Austin Diamond	Germantown Cricket Club Ground, Manheim	Australia by 10 wickets
Match 3	28–30 June	Percy Clark	Austin Diamond	Merion Cricket Club Ground, Manheim	Match drawn
Match 4	4–7 July	Percy Clark	Austin Diamond	Germantown Cricket Club Ground, Manheim	Australia by 409 runs
Match 5	22–25 July	Stuart Saunders	Austin Diamond	Rosedale, Toronto	Australia by an innings and 147 runs

== July ==
=== Ireland in Scotland ===
Three-day Match
No.	Date	Home captain	Away captain	Venue	Result
Match	10–12 July	William Hone	Maurice Dickson	Raeburn Place, Edinburgh	Match drawn
