= Gar Waddy =

Australian cricketer

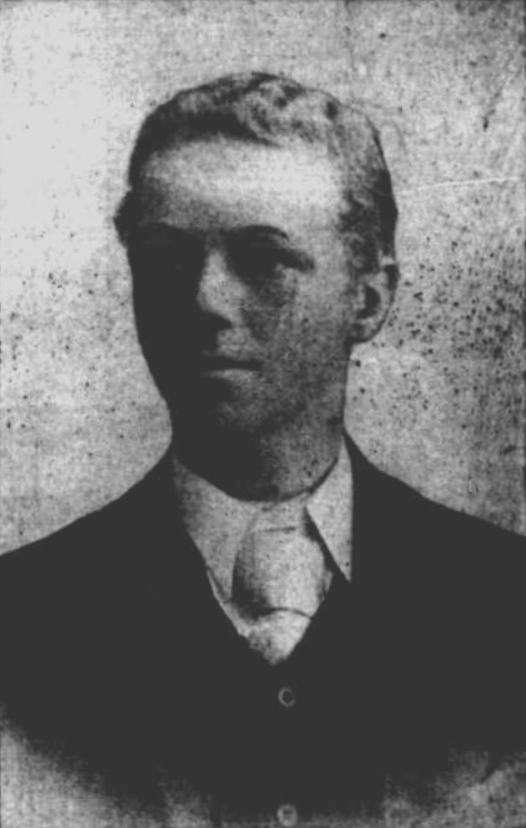

Personal information
- Full name: Edgar Lloyd Waddy
- Born: 3 December 1879; Morpeth, New South Wales, Australia
- Died: 2 August 1963 (aged 83); Collaroy, New South Wales, Australia
- Batting: Right-handed
- Bowling: Right-arm medium
- Role: Wicket-keeper
- Relatives: Mick Waddy (brother); Stacy Waddy (brother); John Lloyd Waddy (son)

Domestic team information
- Years: Team
- 1896/97–1920/21: New South Wales

Career statistics
Competition	First-class
Matches	58
Runs scored	2,775
Batting average	32.64
100s/50s	6/11
Top score	140
Balls bowled	101
Wickets	2
Bowling average	48.00
5 wickets in innings	0
10 wickets in match	0
Best bowling	1/4
Catches/stumpings	41/5
- Source: ESPNcricinfo, 29 May 2021

Edgar Lloyd "Gar" Waddy (3 December 1879 – 2 August 1963) was an Australian cricketer. A a right-handed batsman and wicket-keeper, he played 58 first-class cricket matches, mostly for New South Wales, between 1896 and 1921, scoring 2775 runs and taking two wickets.

Waddy toured New Zealand with the Australian teams in 1913–14 and 1920–21. He played in the two matches against New Zealand on each tour. He made his highest first-class score, 140 in 124 minutes, when he opened the batting in the second match against New Zealand in 1913–14.

He was the father of the Second World War aviator and New South Wales legislator John Lloyd Waddy. Two of his brothers, Ernest Frederick, known as "Mick", and Percival Stacy, known as "Stacy", also played first-class cricket.
