= Mick Waddy =

Australian clergyman, schoolmaster and cricketer

The Reverend Mick Waddy
- Born: 5 October 1880; Morpeth, New South Wales, Australia
- Died: 23 September 1958 (aged 77); South Littleton, Worcestershire, England
- Occupations: Cricketer, teacher, clergyman
- Cricket career

Cricket information

Domestic team information
- Years: Team
- 1902–1914: New South Wales
- 1919–1922: Warwickshire County Cricket Club

Career statistics
Competition	First-class
Matches	55
Runs scored	2,326
Batting average	28.36
100s/50s	0/0
Top score	129
Catches/stumpings	44/0

Ernest Frederick "Mick" Waddy (5 October 1880 – 23 September 1958) was an Australian clergyman, schoolmaster and cricketer who played first-class cricket before the First World War for New South Wales and then from 1919 to 1922 in England for Warwickshire. He was born in Morpeth, New South Wales and died at South Littleton, Worcestershire.

== Background and family ==
Waddy came from a family of cricketers: his brothers Edgar Lloyd Waddy (Gar) and Percival Stacy Waddy (Stacy) both played first-class cricket. He was educated at the King's School, Parramatta and at the University of Sydney, and was ordained as a priest in the Church of England, serving in the 1900s as the curate in the parish of Singleton, New South Wales, where his brother Stacy was the vicar.

== Australian cricketer ==
As a cricketer, Waddy was a right-handed batsman sometimes used as an opener, though his highest score was made batting at No 7; he also bowled right-arm medium-pace, but took no wickets in his three overs in first-class cricket. After a single unsuccessful appearance in first-class cricket for New South Wales in 1902–03, he returned to the team in 1904–05 and was immediately successful, scoring an unbeaten 129 in his first match of the season, the game against South Australia, this being the highest score of his career. He retained his place in the New South Wales team for the major Sheffield Shield matches for the next four seasons, though he was not always successful: in 1906–07, he managed just 46 runs in five innings across the four matches in which he played. He returned to form in 1907–08, however, when he averaged 63 runs per innings and hit two centuries. In the New South Wales match against the touring England team he scored an unbeaten 107 and a second innings 57. After this, he was added as emergency cover twelfth man to the Australian team for the fifth Test match, though he was not required to play. And at the start of the 1908–09 season, there was newspaper speculation that he could be in line for the 1909 Australian Test tour to England.

But Waddy then had a mediocre season and his cricket career in Australia declined to the point where he played his last first-class match there only two seasons later. Waddy also had a career change, though remaining alongside his elder brother: the newspaper report of his marriage in December 1908 to Margaret Helen Christie, matron of the Croydon Cottage Hospital, states that he was employed as a schoolmaster at The King's School, Parramatta, where his brother Stacy had become headmaster. After he ceased from playing, Waddy remained influential in New South Wales cricket, acting as a selector.

In the 1913–14 season, he organised and captained a tour of Ceylon by a New South Wales team that included several former players, among them Test cricketers Roy Minnett and Gerry Hazlitt. The team won eight of its nine matches, and the tour was a considerable success both on and off the field in improving the relations between Ceylon and Australia. In January 1914 Waddy made a splendid century against the Planters at Kandy.

== In England ==
In 1915, Waddy moved to England, taking up a post as a mathematics master at Rugby School; he remained there, becoming a house master, until 1940. When first-class cricket resumed in England in 1919 after the First World War, Waddy, qualified by residence, played in the school holidays for Warwickshire. He had some success in the first three years, scoring a final century, an unbeaten 109 made out of a total of 229, in the 1921 match against Middlesex at Lord's. He was unsuccessful in 1922 and did not appear in first-class cricket after that season, though he continued in club cricket into the 1930s.

On retirement from Rugby School, Waddy became the vicar of South Littleton in Worcestershire where he died in 1958.
