= Rudolph Laver =

Australian-German electrical engineer

Rudolph Laver (19 July 1872 in Castlemaine, Victoria – September 1946 in Berlin) was an Australian-German electrical engineer.

== Biography ==
Rudolph Laver was one of seven sons of farmer Jonas Laver (1819–1880) from Somerset and of Mary Ann née Fry (†1885). In 1899 Rudolph Laver emigrated to Germany, studied electrical engineering in Karlsruhe and Charlottenburg, and was naturalized in Germany in 1915. Laver was director at the power plant company Bergmann Elektrizitätswerke in Berlin. With the outbreak of World War I, large parts of the Bergmann works were converted to armaments production, and Laver was released from his work. In 1934 Laver replaced the then managing director Martin Rosenfeld of the Paul Bouveron GmbH. The name of the company changed to Transformatorenfabrik Rudolph Laver vormals Paul Bouveron GmbH. After his death, his widow Klara, née Rothweiler, inherited the company.

== See also ==
- Frank Laver

== Sources ==
- The Cyclopedia of Victoria, Volume 3, 2012, p. 121. ISBN 978-1236291165
