= Dave Elder (umpire) =

Australian cricket umpire (1865–1954)

- Born: 29 April 1865; Melbourne, Victoria, Australia
- Died: 22 April 1954 (age 88); Deepdene, Victoria, Australia
- Occupation: Cricket Test match umpire
- Years active: 1911–1929

David Alexander Elder (29 April 1865 at Melbourne, Victoria, Australia – 22 April 1954 at Deepdene, Victoria) was a cricket Test umpire.

== Career as umpire ==
He umpired twelve Test matches, all between Australia and England. He made his debut in the match played at Melbourne on 30 December 1911 to 3 January 1912, won by England by 8 wickets. All Elder's other matches were after the First World War. His last match was played at Adelaide on 1 February to 8 February 1929, won narrowly by England in spite of Archie Jackson's 164 on debut. His colleagues were Bob Crockett and George Hele.

Johnnie Moyes thought that, after Crockett...

...Elder was probably the best. He was of the same kindly disposition as Crockett and equally soft-spoken, entirely without any mannerisms, giving his decisions clearly, and making few mistakes.

— Moyes, A. G., "Australian Cricket: A History", Sydney, Angus & Robertson, 1959

== Personal life ==
Off the field, Elder was a brassworker. He was married twice and had one son. He died of heart failure, aged 88.

== See also ==
- Australian Test Cricket Umpires
- List of Test umpires
