= Irene Dölling =

German professor (born 1942)

- Born: 23 December 1942 (age 83); Leicester, England
- Other name: Irene Mayer-Dölling
- Occupation: Sociologist (Women's studies)

Irene Dölling (also known as Irene Mayer-Dölling; born 23 December 1942) is a German sociologist. She is now an Emeritus Professor in Women's studies, having retired from her full-time role at Potsdam University early in 2008. She serves on the advisory board of the feminist academic journal Signs.

At the time of her retirement her colleague Regina Becker-Schmidt commended Dölling for qualities that included her "creative obstinacy" ("kreative Eigensinn").

== Early life ==
Dölling was born during the Second World War in Leicester in England with political refugees as parents. The family were ethnic Germans as well as members of the Communist Party. They had campaigned actively against Nazism during the 1930s, and had been living in what was at the time Czechoslovakia with Czechoslovak passports.However, in 1938 Nazi Germany started a project through the use of military force to incorporate Czechoslovakia into an enlarged German state. The Döllings fled to Britain in 1939.

Her father had worked in the textiles industry before the war (and would return to the trade when he was able to return to the European mainland). Her mother's work lay in the garment industry. Dölling would later recall that her mother, as the eldest of six children, had been forced to cut her schooling short when her mother (Irene's grandmother) fell ill, and the eldest daughter was called upon to look after the family.

== Soviet occupation zone/German Democratic Republic ==
Dölling was not yet three years old when the war ended in May 1945. During a period of wholesale ethnic cleansing there was no longer any question of the German speaking Dölling family returning to Czechoslovakia, where they had lived until 1939. Instead, they established themselves in the Soviet occupation zone of what remained of Germany. By 1946, her father had returned to work in the textiles industry, and Irene Dölling grew up as one of two children in a family home that she later remembers as "bookish and intellectually stimulating." Meanwhile, the Soviet occupation zone formally became the German Democratic Republic in October 1949. A stand-alone East German state sponsored by the Soviet Union on which its one- party constitutional arrangements were modelled. It was here that Dölling made her life until the separate East German state dissolved in 1989/90. In 1961, Dölling passed her school Abitur final exams in Berlin.

Between 1961 and 1966, she studied Library science and Philosophy at Berlin's Humboldt University. The library science represented a job ticket, but the philosophy became a lasting interest. Philosophy at this time was taught within the framework of Marxism as officially defined. After obtaining her degree she remained at the Humboldt as a research assistant and working for her doctorate which she received in 1970. Her dissertation was entitled "On Marxist theories of the driving forces of the practical behaviours of individuals: some preconditions of socialist cultural theory and society". Her Habilitation followed in 1976.

Dölling stayed at the Humboldt, subject to a couple of brief breaks, right up till 1994. In 1985, she was appointed Professor for Culture theory in the university's Cultural studies and Aesthetics Department. By this time she had already started to focus on gender relations and the position of women in East German society. The slaughter of the war had left Germany with a shortage of working age citizens which in the case of East Germany was exacerbated during the 1940/50s by the emigration of several million working-age East Germans to the west. Partly as a result of this, female participation in the work force was relatively high in the German Democratic Republic, which correlated with a commensurate increased level of economic (though not, at least at higher levels, political) status and empowerment for women. By the time Dölling's research interests came to focus on gender issues, roughly 90% of women of working age, supported by state organised child care provision, were in full-time employment. German reunification, formally enacted in 1990, threw into sharp focus a contrast with the situation in (what had till then been) West Germany where a far higher proportion of women of working age stayed at home looking after families; and if they were in paid employment, often working only part-time. Many feminist academics expressed a preference for the work/life balance on offer to women in pre-1990 East Germany, but in any case, as equalisation between the two halves of the country came about during the 1990s, there was no shortage of research topics for the academic staff and students in the Women's studies departments.

== German Federal Republic ==
Irene Dölling co-founded, with Hildegard Maria Nickel, the Centre for cross-disciplinary gender studies (ZtG / Zentrum für transdisziplinäre Geschlechterstudien) at the Humboldt University in on 8 December 1989. In 1990, she became the centre's first Research Director.

In 1994, she finally moved, albeit not very far away, becoming Professor for Women's studies at the Economic and Social Sciences faculty at the University of Potsdam. She remained here till her retirement in 2008. In addition to her teaching, she continued to publish her own work as well as serving on the scientific advisory boards of various academic journals in Germany and internationally.

== Selected works ==
=== Articles in compilations ===
- 'The "New Woman" of the Weimar Republic : Visualization and Standardization of Modernization Processes' (PDF: 472Kb). In: Blostein, David and Pia Kleber; Mirror or Mask? Self-Representation in the Modern Age; Berlin: Vistas Verlag, 2003.
- 'East Germany: Changes in Temporal Structures in Women's Work After the Unification' (PDF: 1216Mb). In: Becker-Schmidt, Regina; Gender and Work in Transition. Globalization in Western, Middle and Eastern Europe; Opladen: Leske + Budrich, 2002.
- 'TEN YEARS AFTER: Gender Relations in a Changed World: New Challeneges for Women's and Gender Studies' (PDF: 665Kb). In: Jähnert, Gabriele et al.; Gender in Transition in Eastern and Central Europe Proceedings; Berlin: trafo Verlag, 2001.
- 'Culture and Gender' (PDF: 999Kb). In: Rueschemeyer, Marilyn and Christiane Lemke; The Quality of Life in the German Democratic Republic. Changes and Developments in a State Socialist Society; Armonk/New York/London: Sharpe, 1989.
