= Robert Cowan (cricketer) =

Australian cricketer

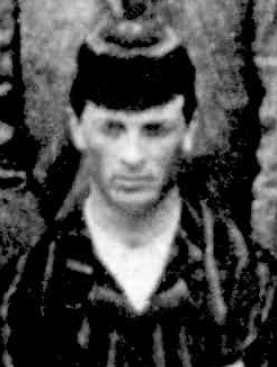

Personal information
- Born: 3 May 1880; Angaston, South Australia
- Died: 11 October 1962 (aged 82); Neutral Bay, New South Wales
- Source: Cricinfo, 6 June 2018

Robert Cowan (3 May 1880 – 11 November 1962) was an Australian cricketer. He played four first-class matches for South Australia between 1904 and 1906.

== See also ==
- List of South Australian representative cricketers
