= John McKenzie (Australian cricketer) =

Australian cricketer

Personal information
- Born: 11 October 1862; Aldinga, South Australia
- Died: 3 June 1944 (aged 81); Hazelwood Park, South Australia
- Source: Cricinfo, 19 August 2020

John McKenzie (11 October 1862 – 3 June 1944) was an Australian cricketer. He played in twenty-two first-class matches for South Australia between 1884 and 1902.

== See also ==
- List of South Australian representative cricketers
