= James Mackay (cricketer) =

Australian cricketer (1880–1953)

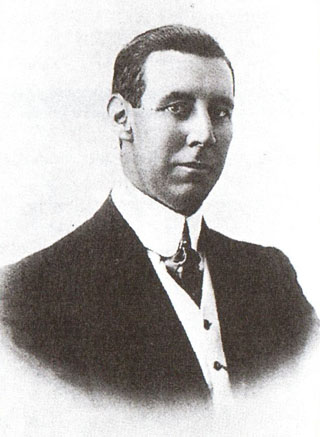

Personal information
- Full name: James Rainey Munro Mackay
- Born: 9 September 1880; Armidale, New South Wales, Australia
- Died: 13 June 1953 (aged 72); Walcha, New South Wales, Australia
- Nickname: Sunny Jim
- Batting: Right-handed

Domestic team information
- Years: Team
- 1902/03–1905/06: New South Wales
- 1906/07: Transvaal

Career statistics
Competition	First-class
Matches	20
Runs scored	1,556
Batting average	50.19
100s/50s	6/7
Top score	203
Catches/stumpings	5/—
- Source: CricketArchive, 26 January 2009

James Rainey Munro Mackay (9 September 1880 – 13 June 1953), better known as "Sunny Jim" Mackay, was an Australian cricketer. He was a right-handed opening batsman who was likened in his youth to Victor Trumper, and was considered unlucky to miss the 1905 Australian tour to England.

== Cricket career ==
Mackay was born in Armidale, New South Wales. He scored 203, 90, 194, 105, 102* and 136 for New South Wales in the 1905/06 season, as well as six centuries for his club side, Burwood. Along with several other players he signed a contract with Melbourne Cricket Club to bring an English side to Australia and was suspended.

He moved to South Africa where, while working at a diamond mine, he scored 247 runs at 35.28 for Transvaal in 1906–07 and was only left out of the South African team to tour England in 1907 because it was felt that he had not spent long enough in the country. His eyesight was damaged when a motorbike knocked him down and his brief but dazzling career was cut short.

Mackay moved back to Sydney and tried to regain his place in the New South Wales side but his injury was too debilitating and he was forced to retire. In just 20 first class matches from 1902/03 to 1906/07, he had scored 1556 runs at 50.19 with six hundreds and seven fifties.

== Personal life ==
Mackay married Catherine Crawford near Walcha in March 1913. He worked on farms in the New England region and for a time at Cunnamulla in Queensland. He and his wife then acquired a farm near Walcha, which they worked until he became ill. He died in hospital in Walcha in June 1953 after a heart attack, aged 72.
