= Charles Barnes (cricketer) =

Australian cricketer

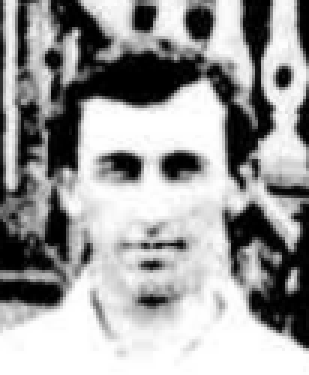

Personal information
- Full name: John Charles Barnes
- Born: 16 October 1882; Sydney, Australia
- Died: 12 August 1947 (aged 64); Sydney, Australia
- Source: Cricinfo, 22 December 2016

Charles Barnes (16 October 1882 – 12 August 1947) was an Australian cricketer. He played twenty-seven first-class matches for New South Wales between 1904/05 and 1912/13.

== See also ==
- List of New South Wales representative cricketers
