= Harry Whiddon =

Australian cricketer

Personal information
- Born: 20 November 1878; Sydney, Australia
- Died: 19 December 1935 (aged 57); Sydney, Australia
- Source: ESPNcricinfo, 6 February 2017

Harry Whiddon (20 November 1878 – 19 December 1935) was an Australian cricketer. He played three first-class matches for New South Wales in 1907/08.

== See also ==
- List of New South Wales representative cricketers
