= John Woodford (Australian cricketer) =

Australian cricketer

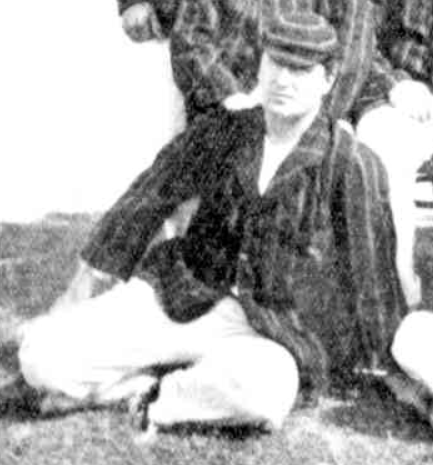

Personal information
- Born: 23 June 1881; Melbourne, Australia
- Died: 1 May 1949 (aged 67); Melbourne, Australia

Domestic team information
- Years: Team
- 1902-1913: Victoria
- Source: Cricinfo, 16 August 2015

John Woodford (23 June 1881 – 1 May 1949) was an Australian cricketer. He played seven first-class cricket matches for Victoria between 1902 and 1913.

== See also ==
- List of Victoria first-class cricketers
