= Dorothy Eleanor Dolling =

Australian community worker (1897–1967)

Dorothy Eleanor Dolling née Clarke OBE (9 June 1897 – 27 June 1967) was a New Zealand-born Australian community worker who has been called the driving force of the Country Women's Association in South Australia, and a journalist who wrote under the pseudonyms 'Marian March' and 'Eleanor Barbour'.

== Early life ==
Dolling was born in Woodhaugh in New Zealand and was the only daughter, and youngest child, of Edgar Scott Clarke and his wife Alice Jane née Barber. The couple had both immigrated from Yorkshire in England. Dolling attended Otago Girls' High School, where she received a scholarship, and went on to study at the University of Otago where she received a bachelor and then masters of science in 1918 and 1919 respectively.

After completing her studies Dolling spent a year, from 1920 to 1921, teaching mathematics and physics at the University of Leeds before returning to New Zealand where she studied advanced mathematics and later migrated to Australia where she settled in Adelaide.

On 13 February 1923 Dolling married Charles Edward Dolling, a medical practitioner in Adelaide. They had two children together; he died in 1936.

== Work as a journalist ==
After the death of her husband, and starting from 1936, Dolling was worked as a journalist and editor for The Advertiser where she edited the women's pages and the rural weekly under the pseudonym 'Marian March'.

Dolling also contributed to The Chronicle under the name 'Eleanor Barbour' where she wrote "Eleanor Barbour's Pages for Country Women"; this name was taken from her middle name and is a variation of her mother's maiden name. In additional to publishing her pages newspaper would often publish letters and articles that were written by readers, which were often published alongside or on her page, which were each directed to "Dear Eleanor Barbour".

She retired from journalism in 1966.

== Community work ==
Between 1929 and 1934 Dolling was the treasurer of the South Australian Country Women's Association where she assisted people going through hard times, including providing bushfire and flood relief to affected families and, during the Great Depression visiting families in remote areas and distributing blankets and other necessities. In 1934 she accompanied her husband on a European trip where she was able to represent the Australian CWA at the executive council of the Associated Country Women of the World in London. One her return to Australia she them was the state secretary of South Australia (1935–1946) and then state president (1947–1950) for the CWA.

Dolling was also a very active volunteer during World War II and she initiate a volunteer personnel register in South Australia and was involved in numerous wartime committees. She also served as an executive member of the Allied Forces Information Bureau and an officer of the Women's Air Training Corps. She was also involved with the Australian Women's Land Army.

Because of this service she received an Order of the British Empire in 1944.

Dolling's community work continued after the war including as the only woman of the South Australian documentary films committee and was the South Australian president of the Royal Flying Doctor Service.

== Later life ==
Dolling died on 27 June 1967 in Adelaide, aged 70.

== Legacy ==
- The Country Women's Association house, Dolling Court, which was sold in the 1980s, was named for her.
- The Dorothy Dolling Memorial Trust, which assists country women and their children to further their education, was established in her memory by her son Scott Dolling.
