= Frederick Vaughan =

Australian cricketer

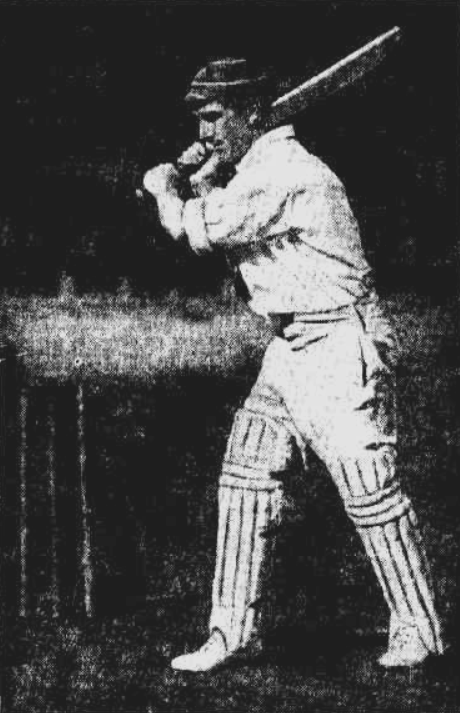

Personal information
- Born: 8 November 1876; England
- Died: 30 September 1926 (aged 49); Melbourne, Australia

Domestic team information
- Years: Team
- 1905-1911: Victoria
- Source: Cricinfo, 15 November 2015

Frederick Vaughan (8 November 1876 – 30 September 1926) was an Australian cricketer. He played eleven first-class cricket matches for Victoria between 1905 and 1911.

== See also ==
- List of Victoria first-class cricketers
