= Leonard Garnsey =

Australian cricketer

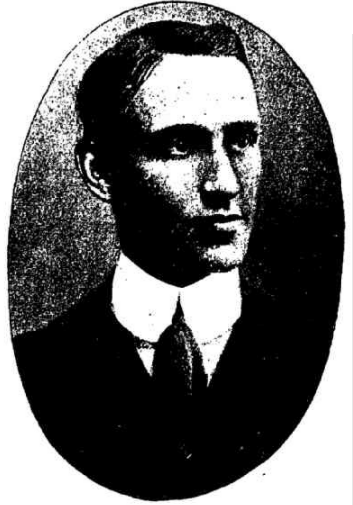

Personal information
- Full name: George Leonard Garnsey
- Born: 10 February 1881; Sydney, Australia
- Died: 18 April 1951 (aged 70); Canberra, Australia
- Batting: Right-handed
- Bowling: Right-arm off spin
- Role: Bowler

Domestic team information
- Years: Team
- 1904-07: New South Wales

Career statistics
Competition	First-class
Matches	18
Runs scored	319
Batting average	14.50
100s/50s	–/–
Top score	37
Balls bowled	-
Wickets	80
Bowling average	22.27
5 wickets in innings	5
10 wickets in match	2
Best bowling	6/35
Catches/stumpings	24/–
- Source: ESPNcricinfo, 15 April 2019

Leonard Garnsey (10 February 1881 – 18 April 1951) was an Australian cricketer. He played eighteen first-class matches for New South Wales between 1904/05 and 1906/07.

== See also ==
- List of New South Wales representative cricketers
