= Francis Johnson (cricketer) =

Australian cricketer

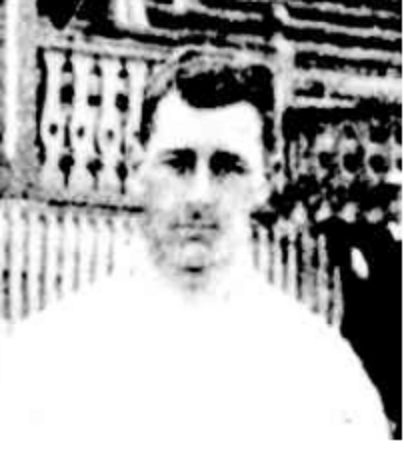

Personal information
- Born: 21 May 1880; Redfern, New South Wales, Australia
- Died: 28 May 1951 (aged 71); Longueville, New South Wales, Australia
- Source: ESPNcricinfo, 1 January 2017

Francis Johnson (21 May 1880 – 28 May 1951) was an Australian cricketer. He played seventeen first-class matches for New South Wales between 1903/04 and 1908/09.

== See also ==
- List of New South Wales representative cricketers
