= Percival Stacy Waddy =

Australian anglican priest (1875–1937)

Stacy Waddy
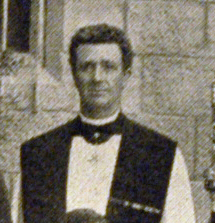
- Waddy in 1922
- Born: 8 January 1875; Carcoar, New South Wales
- Died: 8 February 1937 (aged 62); London, England

Percival Stacy Waddy (8 January 1875 – 8 February 1937) was an Australian schoolmaster, clergyman and cricketer.

== Life ==
Waddy was born at Carcoar, New South Wales, on 8 January 1875. He was the son of Richard A. Waddy, bank-manager and his wife. With Dick Manchee, he played cricket for 'Twenty of Cumberland and District' against Lord Sheffield's visiting English team in December 1891.

In 1901, he married Etheldred Spittal, daughter of the Rev. John Spittal, and granddaughter of Sir James Spittal, Lord Provost of Edinburgh. She survived him with two daughters and three sons, including their son Bernard. Waddy was made an honorary canon of Peterborough Cathedral in 1931. He died on 8 February 1937

As archdeacon he was succeeded by Weston Henry Stewart, who became Bishop of Jerusalem in 1943.

== Bibliography ==
- The Great Moghul (1913)
- Homes of the Psalms (1928)
