= James Giller =

Australian cricketer

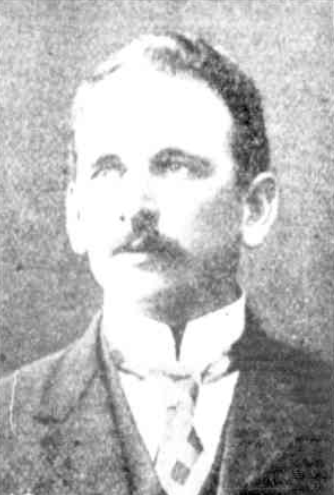
- Giller in 1899

Personal information
- Full name: James Frederick Giller
- Born: 1 May 1870; Melbourne, Australia
- Died: 13 June 1947 (aged 77); Albert Park, Melbourne, Australia
- Batting: Right-handed
- Bowling: Right-arm medium-pace
- Role: All-rounder

Domestic team information
- Years: Team
- 1897-1905: Victoria

Career statistics
Competition	First-class
Matches	19
Runs scored	1016
Batting average	31.75
100s/50s	2/4
Top score	125
Balls bowled	2649
Wickets	41
Bowling average	26.21
5 wickets in innings	2
10 wickets in match	0
Best bowling	7/51
Catches/stumpings	16/0
- Source: Cricinfo, 19 December 2020

James Frederick Giller (1 May 1870 – 13 June 1947) was an Australian cricketer. He played first-class cricket for Victoria between 1897 and 1905.

An opening batsman and medium-paced bowler, Giller was one of Victoria's leading players in the 1898-99 Sheffield Shield, with 325 runs at an average of 46.42 and 12 wickets at 14.00. He played in the three trial matches, Australian XI versus The Rest, at the end of the season to help the selectors choose the team to tour England that year, but was not successful. He made his highest score of 125 in his final first-class match, against New South Wales in 1904-05. His best figures were 7 for 51 against South Australia in 1898-99, when he also scored 116 in the same match.

Giller represented South Melbourne in Melbourne district cricket. He died at his home in the Melbourne suburb of Albert Park in June 1947, survived by his wife and their two daughters.

== See also ==
- List of Victoria first-class cricketers
