= Hughie Carroll =

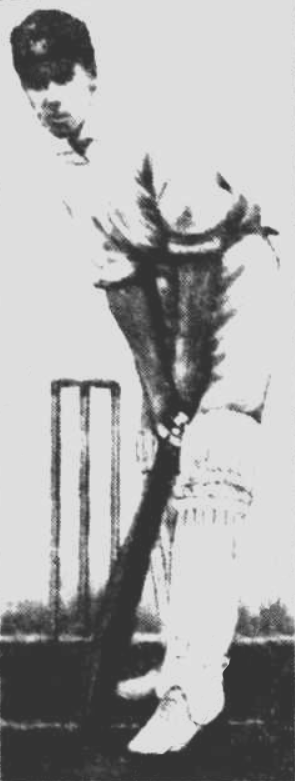

Personal information
- Full name: Eugene Vincent Carroll
- Born: 17 January 1885; South Melbourne, Victoria, Australia
- Died: 18 September 1965 (aged 80); Elsternwick, Melbourne, Victoria

Domestic team information
- Years: Team
- 1905/06 - 1923/24: Victoria
- Source: Cricinfo, 18 November 2015

Eugene Vincent "Hughie" Carroll (17 January 1885 – 18 September 1965) was an Australian cricketer who played first-class cricket for Victoria between 1905–06 and 1923–24. A specialist right-hand batsman, Carroll was born and raised in South Melbourne, and joined the local South Melbourne Cricket Club as a youth. He had a long association with South, and during the 1930s he coached the future Australian cricket captains Lindsay Hassett and Ian Johnson, as well as Australia's greatest all-rounder, Keith Miller.

When he turned 18, Hughie and his brother Eddie crossed over to North Melbourne Cricket Club and he made his 1st XI debut in 1903/04 and played 5 seasons at the club. While playing for North Melbourne he was also called up for Victoria, debuting in 1905/06.

In 1908, he joined the East Melbourne Cricket Club. This culminated in a successful period for club and state. In his third season for Victoria (1907/08) he scored consistently and made 61 against the touring English team, which put his name up as a possible Australian selection. In February 1909 he played for the Rest of Australia XI against the Australian Test team, scoring 69 runs in the first innings.

Carroll stayed at East Melbourne until the outbreak of the First World War. After the resumption of District Cricket in 1918, he returned to the 1st XI ranks at Northcote Cricket Club in December 1918 and staying there until the end of the 1923/24 season. He even returned to the Victorian team for 2 games, one in 1922 and the other in 1924, when he was 39 years of age. He then played 2 seasons for Fitzroy Cricket Club in 1924/25 and 1925/26.

In total, Carroll played 37 first-class matches for 1,706 runs at an average of 26.24. His only century was 112 against South Australia at Adelaide Oval in November 1906, batting at number six.

Carroll then left Melbourne, making his way to coach and play for Kyabram Cricket Club for 3 seasons, completely dominating the Kyabram District Cricket Association. In season 1926/27 he averaged 70; in 1927/28 he average 111; and in 1928/29 he averaged 109, including 14 centuries. In that season's final he made 301 not out of a total of 404.

He was then appointed coach of Shepparton Cricket Club and made 141 in his first game for the club in 1929. By now he was 44 years of age, but in 10 games for the club he scored 450 runs at an average of 56.25. Work then took him to Benalla in January 1930.

In 1931 he returned to Melbourne, returning to 1st XI District Cricket with St Kilda Cricket Club at the age of 46. But he was not lost to country cricket, as he was appointed coach of the Victorian Country Cricket League and undertook coaching clinics in Shepparton in November 1931.

Carroll died in the Melbourne suburb of Elsternwick at the age of 80.
