= Austin Diamond =

Australian cricketer (1874–1966)

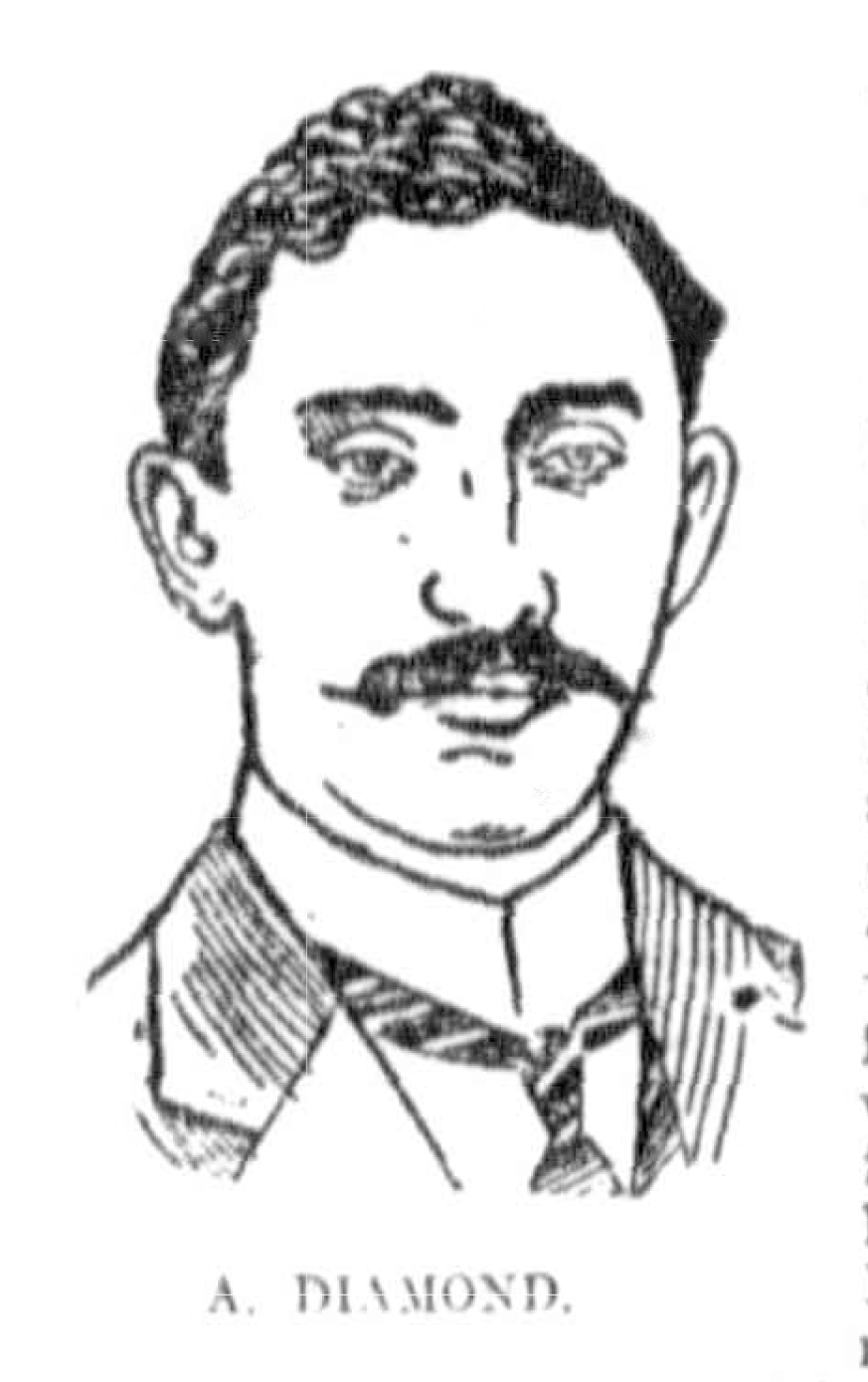
- Newspaper drawing of Austin Diamond in 1900

Personal information
- Born: 10 July 1874; Marsden, Yorkshire, England
- Died: 5 August 1966 (aged 92); Roseville, New South Wales, Australia
- Batting: Right-handed

Domestic team information
- Years: Team
- 1899–1918: New South Wales
- First-class debut: 30 December 1899 New South Wales v Tasmania
- Last First-class: 26 December 1918 New South Wales v Victoria

Career statistics
Competition	FC
Matches	35
Runs scored	1681
Batting average	32.96
100s/50s	4/4
Top score	210 not out
Catches/stumpings	36/0
- Source: Cricinfo, 11 April 2014

Austin Diamond (10 July 1874 – 5 August 1966) was a cricketer who played first-class cricket for New South Wales from 1899 to 1918, including 14 matches as captain.

A disciplined and determined batsman, Diamond had his best season in 1906–07, when he scored 502 runs at an average of 83.66, including his only double-century, 210 not out against Victoria. Diamond captained the unofficial Australian tour to Fiji, Canada and the US from May to September 1913. The tour included five first-class matches, as well as many minor matches.

He served as a lieutenant with the 18th Australian Infantry Battalion in World War I. He played one last first-class match during the 1918–19 season.

== See also ==
- List of New South Wales representative cricketers
