= Vernon Ransford =

Australian cricketer and cricket administrator (1885–1958)

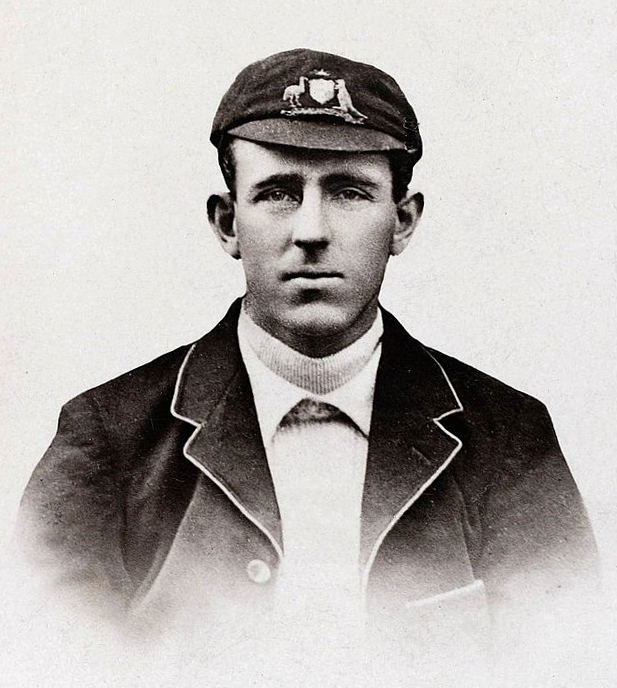
- Ransford in 1909

Personal information
- Full name: Vernon Seymour Ransford
- Born: 20 March 1885; South Yarra, Melbourne, Australia
- Died: 19 March 1958 (aged 72); Brighton, Melbourne, Australia
- Batting: Left-handed
- Bowling: Slow left-arm orthodox

International information
- National side: Australia
- Test debut (cap 91): 13 December 1907 v England
- Last Test: 1 March 1912 v England

Domestic team information
- Years: Team
- 1903/04–1927/28: Victoria

Career statistics
| Competition | Test | First-class |
|---|---|---|
| Matches | 20 | 142 |
| Runs scored | 1,211 | 8,268 |
| Batting average | 37.84 | 42.39 |
| 100s/50s | 1/5 | 25/32 |
| Top score | 143* | 190 |
| Balls bowled | 43 | 1,692 |
| Wickets | 1 | 29 |
| Bowling average | 28.00 | 30.62 |
| 5 wickets in innings | 0 | 1 |
| 10 wickets in match | 0 | 0 |
| Best bowling | 1/9 | 6/38 |
| Catches/stumpings | 10/– | 74/– |
- Source: Cricinfo, 8 August 2021

Vernon Seymour Ransford OBE (20 March 1885 – 19 March 1958) was an Australian cricketer who played in 20 Test matches between 1907 and 1912.

Ransford was a smooth and stylish left-handed batsman who could score with ease all round the wicket or defend patiently as the situation required. He played first-class cricket for Victoria from 1904 to 1928, and was the first Victorian to score a century in each innings of a match, with 182 and 110 against New South Wales in 1907–08. In 1908–09 he was the leading run-scorer in the Sheffield Shield, with 720 runs in four matches at an average of 120.00 and four centuries. He was also an outstanding fieldsman, who could pick up and throw the ball in one movement and with great accuracy.

Ransford's best Test series was the 1909 tour of England when he topped the Australian batting averages, helped by a career-best score of 143 not out in Australia's victory at Lord's, finishing with 353 runs at an average of 58.83. On the whole tour he made 1783 runs at an average of 43.48, and hit six centuries. These performances led to his selection as a Wisden Cricketer of the Year.

Ransford toured New Zealand with Australian teams in 1913–14 and in 1920–21, when he captained the side. He also toured New Zealand with Victoria in 1924–25.

After retiring from playing, Ransford served as president of the Melbourne Football Club in 1927–28, and secretary of the Melbourne Cricket Club (where he had played his senior club cricket) from 1939 to 1957, ably steering the club and its ground, the Melbourne Cricket Ground, through the ground's use as a military camp in World War II and its later use as the chief venue for the 1956 Summer Olympics. He was awarded the OBE in the 1954 Queen's Birthday Honours.
