= Les Vernon =

Australian sportsman

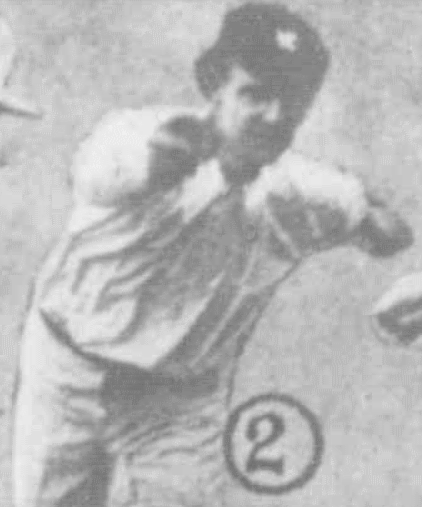

Personal information
- Full name: Leslie Phillip Vernon
- Born: 29 May 1880; Melbourne, Victoria
- Died: 11 May 1957 (aged 76); Ashwood, Victoria
- Original team: West Melbourne Juniors

Playing career^{1}
Years	Club	Games (Goals)
1898	Carlton	3 (1)
1900–01	South Melbourne	19 (0)
Total		22 (1)
- ^{1} Playing statistics correct to the end of 1901.

Leslie Phillip Vernon (29 May 1880 – 11 May 1957) was an Australian sportsman who represented Victoria in the Sheffield Shield and played Australian rules football with Carlton and South Melbourne in the Victorian Football League (VFL).
