= John Pellew (cricketer) =

Australian cricketer

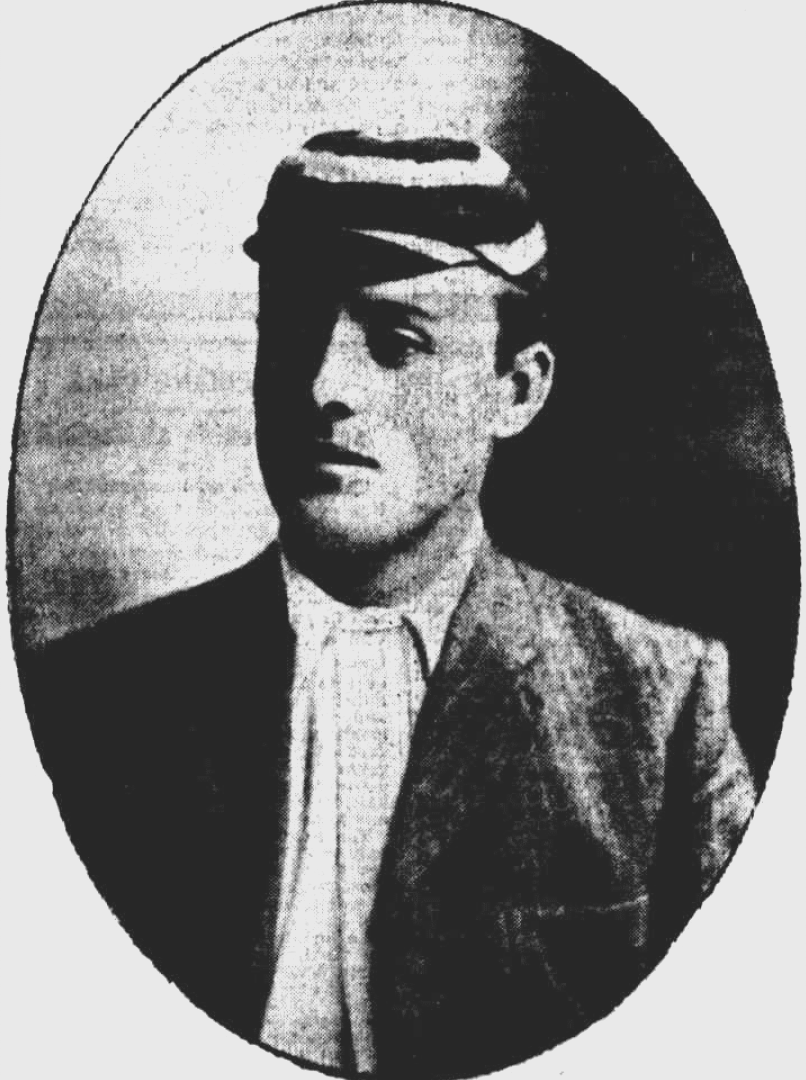

Personal information
- Full name: John Harold Pellew
- Born: 17 July 1882; Adelaide, Australia
- Died: 17 October 1946 (aged 64); Unley Park
- Source: Cricinfo, 18 September 2020

John Pellew (17 July 1882 – 17 October 1946) was an Australian cricketer. He played in twenty-one first-class matches for South Australia between 1903 and 1909. He was once regarded as "one of South Australia's most brilliant batsmen." He was the brother of Arthur Pellew, and a cousin of Nip and Lance Pellew, who were all cricketers.

== Death ==
On 17 October 1946, Pellew was killed when he was struck by a train at the Unley Park railway station. His body was taken by the train to Royal Adelaide Hospital.

== See also ==
- List of South Australian representative cricketers
