= Charlie Dolling =

Australian doctor, cricketer and cricket administrator (1886 – 1936)

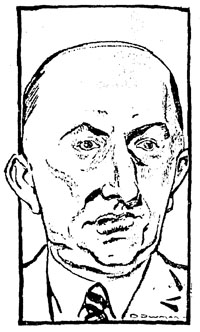
- Charlie Dolling, Test selector, by Dowman, 1932

Personal information
- Full name: Charles Edward Dolling
- Born: 4 September 1886; Wokurna, near Port Broughton, South Australia, Australia
- Died: 11 June 1936 (aged 49); Adelaide, South Australia
- Batting: Right-handed

Domestic team information
- Years: Team
- 1905–06 to 1922–23: South Australia

Career statistics
Competition	First-class
Matches	29
Runs scored	1744
Batting average	34.88
100s/50s	4/9
Top score	140
Balls bowled	84
Wickets	1
Bowling average	71.00
5 wickets in innings	0
10 wickets in match	0
Best bowling	1/15
Catches/stumpings	10/0
- Source: Cricket Archive, 20 November 2015

Charles Edward Dolling (4 September 1886 – 11 June 1936) was an Australian doctor, cricketer and cricket administrator.

== Early life and career ==
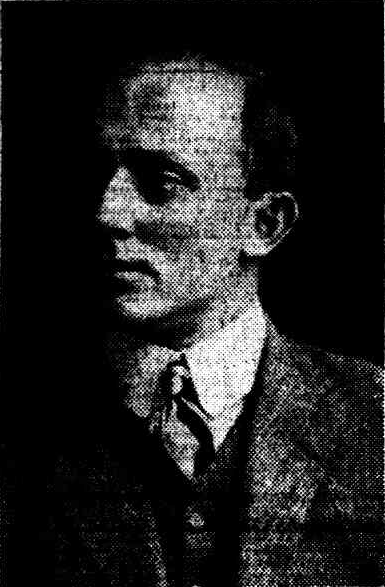
CE Dolling, 1914.

Charlie Dolling was born in the South Australian rural community of Wokurna on the Yorke Peninsula, inland from Port Broughton, to a family of German origin. He went to school at Way College in Unley and Prince Alfred College, Adelaide, where he captained the First XI in 1904–05 and 1905–06. In December 1904, in the annual match against St Peter's College, he scored 311 and took six wickets in an innings victory. In the corresponding match a year later he made 106 and 27 not out and took 13 wickets in a nine-wicket victory.

A few weeks later Dolling made his first-class debut for South Australia in a Sheffield Shield match against Victoria at the Melbourne Cricket Ground. He scored 30 in the second innings and put on 80 for the fourth wicket with Norman Claxton, and South Australia went on to win by 120 runs. In the match against New South Wales at the Sydney Cricket Ground that followed immediately, he top-scored in the second innings with 83 not out.

While studying for a medical degree at the University of Adelaide Dolling was a regular player for South Australia. He made his first century against New South Wales in 1907–08, when his 113 in the second innings allowed South Australia to leave New South Wales to score 593 for victory, and they were eventually all out for 572. Later that season he made 140 against the touring MCC. He was selected to play for The Rest against an Australian XI at the end of the season, and again at the end of the 1910–11 season.

Once he graduated and began his medical career, Dolling had less time for cricket. In 1912 he took up a practice in Minlaton on the Yorke Peninsula. He did not play any first-class cricket in the 1912–13 or 1913–14 seasons, but was nevertheless selected to tour New Zealand with the Australian team at the end of the 1913–14 Australian season. He played in both matches against New Zealand, scoring 109 in 118 minutes in the second match at Auckland.

== World War I and later career ==
Dolling was studying and working in England when World War I began in 1914. He enlisted in the Royal Army Medical Corps in 1915 and served in Egypt, at the 15th RAMC Hospital in Alexandria, and in France. He returned to Australia in 1921.

He captained South Australia in his last three first-class matches in 1922–23, two of them against the visiting MCC team. In Adelaide cricket for West Torrens in 1922–23 he made 856 runs at an average of 71.33, setting a new club record.

On 13 February 1923, at St Paul's Anglican Church, Adelaide, he married Dorothy Eleanor Dolling, a New Zealander with a degree in advanced mathematics, who shared his love of cricket. They had a daughter and a son.

Dolling became a cricket selector for South Australia, and in 1928 he was appointed to the Australian Test selection panel. He continued to serve in both positions until his death, and also managed South Australian teams. He did post-graduate study at a London hospital in 1934, at a time that coincided with the Australian Test team's tour of England. He also studied in Germany; he spoke German fluently.

== Death ==
Dolling suffered a seizure in his surgery on 11 June 1936 and died within an hour. In an obituary, The Referee, assessing his work as a selector, said he "was an exceptional judge of a cricketer and possessed a high judicial sense of fair play". Don Bradman, who was appointed to the Test selection panel in his place, said Dolling was "a wise and tactful administrator, and that, as a selector, he enjoyed the confidence of everybody".

Dorothy Dolling (1897–1967) was a prominent member of the Country Women's Association and was awarded the OBE for her welfare work during World War II.

== See also ==
- List of South Australian representative cricketers
