= Gerry Hazlitt =

Australian cricketer (1888–1915)

Personal information
- Born: 4 September 1888; Enfield, New South Wales, Australia
- Died: 30 October 1915 (aged 27); Parramatta, New South Wales, Australia
- Batting: Right-handed
- Bowling: Right-arm medium; Right-arm offbreak

International information
- National side: Australia
- Test debut (cap 89): 13 December 1907 v England
- Last Test: 19 August 1912 v England

Career statistics
Competition	Test	First-class
Matches	9	57
Runs scored	89	876
Batting average	11.12	12.69
100s/50s	0/0	0/5
Top score	34*	82*
Balls bowled	1,563	10,363
Wickets	23	188
Bowling average	27.08	26.09
5 wickets in innings	1	8
10 wickets in match	0	0
Best bowling	7/25	7/25
Catches/stumpings	4/0	32/0
- Source: Cricinfo, 13 October 2022

Gervys Rignold Hazlitt, commonly known as Gerry (4 September 1888 – 30 October 1915), was an Australian cricketer who played in nine Test matches from 1907 to 1912.

== Cricket career ==
A right-arm medium-pace & off-spin bowler and a useful lower-order batsman. Hazlitt made his debut in Sydney, Australia in the First Test against England in December 1907. He made 34 not out and put on 56 for the ninth wicket in 39 minutes with Tibby Cotter to give Australia victory by two wickets, scoring 18 & 34 and taking two catches. His performance in the second game in Melbourne was poor in all aspects. He took no wickets, scored only 4 runs, and most importantly he missed the opportunity to enact a run-out for what would have been the first Tied test. With Arthur Fielder slow to leave the crease and the scores level, Hazlitt threw the ball wildly past the wicketkeeper allowing Sydney Barnes to score the winning run. He was dropped from the side and didn't play Test cricket again until he toured England with the Australian team in 1912.

He played for Victoria from 1905–06 to 1910–11, then moved to Sydney to take up a position teaching at The King's School, Parramatta, and played for Central Cumberland District Cricket Club and New South Wales in 1911–12 and 1912–13.

Gerry produced a stunning finish to his test career. In his last Test, against England at The Oval in 1912, he took 7 for 25 in the second innings. He bowled cutters to good effect on a rain-affected track at The Oval, London and took 5 wickets for 1 run in his last 17 balls to finish with career-best figures of 7 for 25 in 21.4 overs. However England won the match by 244 runs to take the triangular series, that also included South Africa. Australia did not play another Test until after the First World War, by which time Hazlitt had died. Born with a weak heart, Hazlitt died after suffering a heart attack in 1915, aged 27.
