= Jack O'Connor (Australian cricketer) =

Australian cricketer

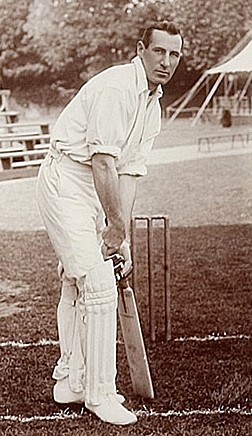

Personal information
- Full name: John Denis Alphonsus O'Connor
- Born: 9 September 1875; Boorowa, New South Wales, Australia
- Died: 23 August 1941 (aged 65); Lewisham, Sydney, Australia
- Batting: Left-handed
- Bowling: Right-arm medium

International information
- National side: Australia
- Test debut (cap 93): 10 January 1908 v England
- Last Test: 27 May 1909 v England

Domestic team information
- Years: Team
- 1904-05 to 1905-06: New South Wales
- 1906-07 to 1909-10: South Australia

Career statistics
Competition	Tests	First-class
Matches	4	50
Runs scored	86	695
Batting average	12.28	11.77
100s/50s	0/0	0/2
Top score	20	54
Balls bowled	692	10937
Wickets	13	224
Bowling average	26.15	23.45
5 wickets in innings	1	18
10 wickets in match	0	5
Best bowling	5/40	7/36
Catches/stumpings	3/0	32/0
- Source: Cricinfo, 20 December 2021

John Denis Alphonsus O'Connor (9 September 1875 – 23 August 1941) was an Australian cricketer who played in four Tests from January 1908 to May 1909. On his debut, he took five wickets in the second innings against England in Adelaide.

O'Connor played first-class cricket for New South Wales from 1905 to early 1906, and for South Australia from late 1906 to 1910. He toured England with the Australian team in 1909.

== See also ==
- List of New South Wales representative cricketers
