= Warwick Armstrong =

Australian cricketer (1879–1947)

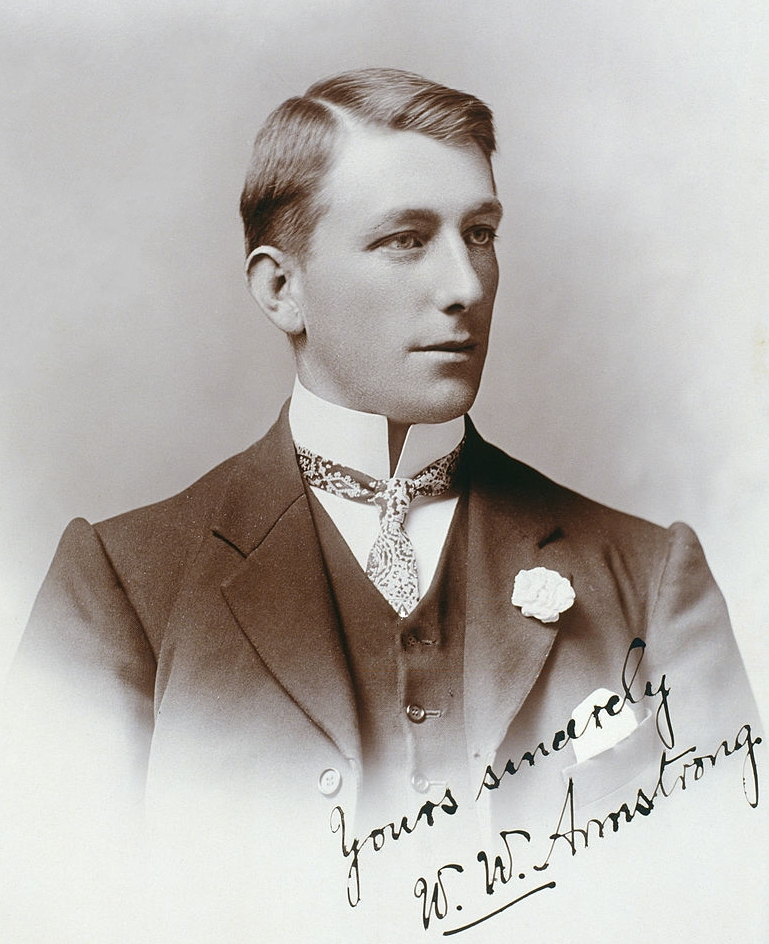
- Armstrong in 1902

Personal information
- Full name: Warwick Windridge Armstrong
- Born: 22 May 1879; Kyneton, Colony of Victoria
- Died: 13 July 1947 (aged 68); Darling Point, New South Wales, Australia
- Nickname: The Big Ship
- Height: 6 ft 3 in (1.91 m)
- Batting: Right-handed
- Bowling: Right-arm leg spin
- Role: All-rounder

International information
- National side: Australia (1902–1921)
- Test debut (cap 80): 1 January 1902 v England
- Last Test: 16 August 1921 v England

Domestic team information
- Years: Team
- 1898/99–1921/22: Victoria

Career statistics
Competition	Tests	First-class
Matches	50	269
Runs scored	2,863	16,158
Batting average	38.68	46.83
100s/50s	6/8	45/57
Top score	159*	303*
Balls bowled	8,022	43,313
Wickets	87	832
Bowling average	33.59	19.71
5 wickets in innings	3	50
10 wickets in match	0	5
Best bowling	6/35	8/47
Catches/stumpings	44/–	275/–
- Source: CricketArchive, 18 December 2007

Warwick Windridge Armstrong (22 May 1879 – 13 July 1947) was an Australian cricketer who played 50 Test matches between 1902 and 1921. An all-rounder, he captained Australia in ten Test matches between 1920 and 1921, and was undefeated, winning eight Tests and drawing two. Armstrong was captain of the 1920–21 Australian team which defeated the touring English 5–0: one of only three teams to win an Ashes series in a whitewash. In a Test career interrupted by the First World War, he scored 2,863 runs at an average of 38.68, including six centuries, and took 87 wickets. He was inducted into the Australian Cricket Hall of Fame in 2000.

Armstrong was a large man (6 foot 3 inches – 1.9 m tall and 21 stone – 133 kg or 294 lb) and was known as the "Big Ship". He was not a stylish batsman but his strokeplay was effective, with a sound defence and temperament. He bowled leg spin with a gentle action and while not a big turner of the ball, he relied on accuracy to dismiss opponents. He made his Test debut in 1902 against England at the Melbourne Cricket Ground (MCG) and was selected to tour England later that year where he was named as one of the Wisden Cricketers of the Year. That was the first of four tours of England. He was involved in several altercations with cricket administrators and was one of the "Big Six" who boycotted the 1912 Triangular Tournament in England after a dispute with the Australian Board of Control for International Cricket.

A talented Australian rules footballer, Armstrong briefly represented South Melbourne in the Victorian Football League before playing Test cricket. For much of his cricket career, he was employed as a pavilion clerk by the Melbourne Cricket Club, who allowed him time off to play cricket. Following his retirement from Test and first-class cricket after the successful 1921 tour of England, Armstrong took a position as an agent for a scotch whisky distributor and wrote on cricket for the Sydney Evening News.

== Early life ==
Armstrong was born in the rural Victorian town of Kyneton in 1879, the eldest son of John and his wife Amelia (née Flynn). The marriage was across the sectarian divide, then strong in Australia: John was an Anglican; Amelia was a Catholic. The Armstrong family moved to Melbourne in 1880, settling in the inner suburb of Emerald Hill, Victoria. An inheritance enabled the family to move to a larger house, "Arra Glen" in North Caulfield, Victoria in 1888.

Armstrong attended Cumloden School, a respected sporting member of the Schools Association, a group of smaller private schools in Melbourne. By 1893, he had found himself a spot in the school XI and came to the attention of the press, catching the eye of journalists Reginald Wilmot and Tom Horan. Armstrong joined the nearby Caulfield Cricket Club and played in a senior premiership with the club at the age of 15.

The next year, the St Kilda Cricket Club, one of the leading clubs in Melbourne's pennant competition, gave the youthful Armstrong a trial. In the 1896–97 season, Armstrong fell out with St Kilda and returned to Caulfield. His last years of school were at University College.

Leaving school at 19, Armstrong joined his father's former club, South Melbourne, captained by Australian Test captain Harry Trott. Armstrong was an immediate success, scoring 101 runs against University and 173 against his former club, St Kilda. He was selected to represent Victoria against Tasmania in Hobart in January 1899, as one of seven in the squad making their first-class cricket débuts. Armstrong's performance was promising, scoring six and 33 and taking four for 78 in 27 overs.

Armstrong began regular Sheffield Shield cricket in the 1899–1900 season. In his first match against New South Wales in January 1900, he dismissed Syd Gregory with his second delivery and scored 45 runs in the second innings. In the Pennant season for South Melbourne, Armstrong scored 665 runs at an average of 95; this included 145 and six for nineteen against the Melbourne Cricket Club, the largest club in Melbourne whose team included many Test and first-class cricketers.

== Representative cricket ==
=== Early career ===
Following his feats against it in 1899–1900, Armstrong was recruited for the next season by the Melbourne Cricket Club (MCC). For the next twenty years, on and off the pitch, Armstrong's fortunes were tied to the club, a leading cricketing light in Australia and a bastion of the city's rich and powerful. He scored his maiden first-class century, 118, against South Australia, facing the very fast and physically dangerous bowling of Ernie Jones, and by the end of the 1900–01 season he was a permanent member of the Victorian team.

The England cricket team, organised and captained by Archie MacLaren, toured Australia to compete for the Ashes in the summer of 1901–02. The English were considered a poor and undermanned team, but it surprised all by winning the first Test at the Sydney Cricket Ground by an innings and 124 runs. Before the second Test, Armstrong had an excellent all-round performance against New South Wales, dismissing Test players Victor Trumper and Syd Gregory, and then scoring 137 in reply. When the team for the Melbourne Test was announced, Armstrong was selected, making his début with Reggie Duff from New South Wales.

Armstrong made a steady start to Test cricket. Batting at No. 9 on a sticky wicket, he made four not out in the first innings, in an Australian total of 116. In reply, England could only score 61. With the wicket still treacherous, Australia rearranged their batting order to save the better batsmen until conditions improved. The two debutants, Duff and Armstrong, were positioned at 10 and 11, and shared a 120-run partnership for the last wicket, Duff scoring 104 and Armstrong 45 not out. Australia won the Test by 229 runs. Armstrong played in the remaining Tests in the series, narrowly heading the averages with 159 runs at an average of 53, and Australia went on to win comfortably by four matches to one.

Armstrong was selected as part of the Australian cricket team to tour England in 1902. He started the tour well, taking eight for 47 in the second innings against Nottinghamshire, his best bowling figures to that date. The first Test, at Edgbaston was rain-affected and the Australians were lucky to come away with a draw, being dismissed for 36 in their first innings. The rest of the close-fought series was followed with interest by the English public. The second Test at Lord's was rained off, and Australia won the third at Bramall Lane by 143 runs. The final two Tests were nail-biters – Australia winning the fourth at Old Trafford by only three runs and England earning a consolation victory in the fifth Test at the Oval by one wicket, when last-wicket pair George Hirst and Wilfred Rhodes eked out the final runs. Armstrong had a good tour, making 1,075 runs at 27.56 and taking 72 wickets at an average of 17.90, but the star for the Australians was Victor Trumper, who made 2,570 runs at an average of 48.49 including eleven centuries.

On the return trip to Australia, the touring team stopped in South Africa to play three Tests, the first between the two nations. In the second Test at Johannesburg, Armstrong scored 159, just over half the Australian score of 309 and carried his bat through the innings as Australia won the Test by 159 runs. Australia won the Test series two–nil. On return to Australia for the 1902–03 season, he made 580 runs at an average of 58 and 23 wickets at an average of just over 19. The highlights of his season included 145 against Queensland and a hat-trick against New South Wales.

Plum Warner's English team toured Australia in 1903–04, the first to do so under the auspices of the Marylebone Cricket Club. The strong English team defeated Australia three–two, retrieving the Ashes. Armstrong did not have a good series. He was tormented by Rhodes, who dismissed him eight times in ten meetings for Victoria and Australia that summer. As a result, he was dropped from the Australian XI after the Third Test.

Returning to club cricket, Armstrong found form, scoring 438 in only 455 minutes for Melbourne against University, from a total score of 699 for eight. In the 1904–05 season, Armstrong scored 460 runs at 57.5 for Victoria to secure selection for the 1905 tour of England.

=== Consolidation and conflict ===
The 1905 Australians left for England, leaving behind the beginnings of a conflict between players and administrators over control of cricket that would poison the sport in Australia for the next ten years. While previous tours of England had been underwritten by the Melbourne Cricket Club and organised by the players, the new Australian Board of Control was asserting its right to control Australian cricket.

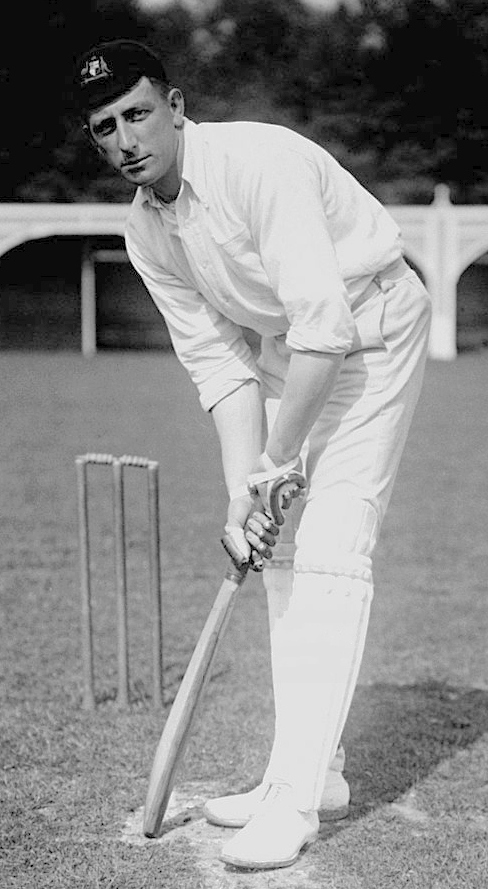
Armstrong's stance at the wicket

Armstrong, finding himself promoted to number five in the batting order, started the tour well with 112 against Nottinghamshire and 248 against Gentlemen of England at Lord's. In the first Test at Trent Bridge, Australia's lack of effective bowling options had Armstrong forced to bowl wide outside the leg stump in an early form of leg theory bowling to prevent the England batsmen from scoring quickly. Bumbling and taciturn, Armstrong maintained an accurate line and length, and put a strangle on both England's run-scoring and the crowd's entertainment. It was a recurrent pattern for the rest of the series, and lead to what was seen by spectators and the press as dull cricket. Batsmen like the imperial Archie MacLaren would kick the ball away contemptuously, but lissome Johnny Tyldesley proved that runs could still made if a batsman employed more enterprise. Hopping away to leg to make room for himself, Tyldesley cut and drove the leg-spinner to great effect in a strategy later used by Don Bradman against the bodyline menace.

Armstrong's tactics were ultimately futile, a Stanley Jackson-inspired England winning the series by two Tests to none. For the season, he scored 1,902 runs at an average of fifty. Regarding his batting, Wisden Cricketers' Almanack said, "The great batsman of the eleven was Armstrong. In form nearly all through the tour, he struck the happy medium, being brilliant without recklessness." The highlight of his tour was a triple century (303 not out) at the Recreation Ground in Bath against Somerset.

When the team returned to Australia, the rift between the players and the Board of Control widened. The dispute saw the English postpone their tour, scheduled for 1906–07. In the midst of all this turmoil, Armstrong continued to impress: on tour with Melbourne Cricket Club in New Zealand, he was described by that country's Herald newspaper as a "team almost in himself". He made 868 runs at an average of 124 to complement his 83 wickets at under ten. He was elected captain of Victoria by his teammates for the match against New South Wales, commencing on New Year's Eve, responding with six for 68 with the ball and then scoring 168 in the second innings as part of a sturdy rearguard effort.

Armstrong found employment with the Department of Home Affairs and, as a result, declared himself unavailable for the next match against South Australia. He was mortified when he found that he had been included in the team and that the Victorian Cricket Association (VCA) had approached his employer to ask for leave on his behalf, despite his having explicitly instructed the VCA secretary otherwise. Armstrong refused to play and was called to face a disciplinary hearing at the Young and Jackson Hotel. Rightly indignant, he was left unpunished.

The scheduled tour postponed from the previous season kicked off with the arrival of an English team weakened by the withdrawals of a number of leading players. The first Test saw an Australian victory, Armstrong bowling 53 overs and taking four for 92. More squabbling, this time over expenses, followed between Armstrong and the VCA, and the former withdrew from the Boxing Day match against New South Wales. Armstrong sought a £1 per diem, but the VCA held fast at ten shillings. It then mounted a campaign in the Melbourne press, attempting to portray Armstrong as avaricious and once again called him to front a disciplinary commission. Following threats of suspension, Armstrong was forced to apologise to the VCA. The fracas did not affect his form, however: the second Test, starting on New Year's Day, saw Armstrong score 31 and 77 and take five wickets for 89. Despite his efforts, England won a hard-fought Test by one wicket.

Australia took the third Test in Adelaide, and a patient 133 in 289 minutes from Armstrong in the fourth saw Australia clinch the series and win back the Ashes. The margin was four–one, but both teams were criticised by reporters for slow scoring and negative cricket.

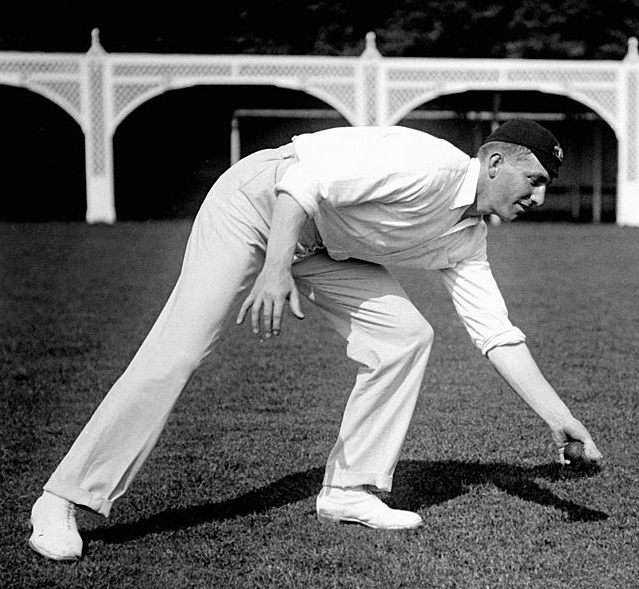
Armstrong fielding

Once again, the selection and management of the Australian team to tour England in 1909 caused friction between leading players and the Board of Control. Clem Hill, unwilling to tour on the terms offered by the Board, withdrew his name from consideration. Regardless, the tour was a success, both for the Australians, who won the series two-one, and for Armstrong, who made 1,451 runs at an average of just under 44 and took 133 wickets at an average of 16.40 Wisden Cricketers' Almanack described his role in the tour as "to keep the side together by means of his impregnable defence, and he did exactly what was required, only on rare occasions giving free play to his hitting power. When he likes to let himself loose there is no harder driver in the world".

Armstrong, along with Monty Noble, Tibby Cotter and Bert Hopkins returned home via Sri Lanka (then Ceylon), Penang and Singapore, where they were lavishly entertained and comfortably billeted by the elite of the Colony. Their hosts took the cricketers on a trip to the British protectorate of Perak for a shooting expedition where Armstrong contracted malaria. He would suffer relapses throughout the rest of his life.

=== Rebellion ===
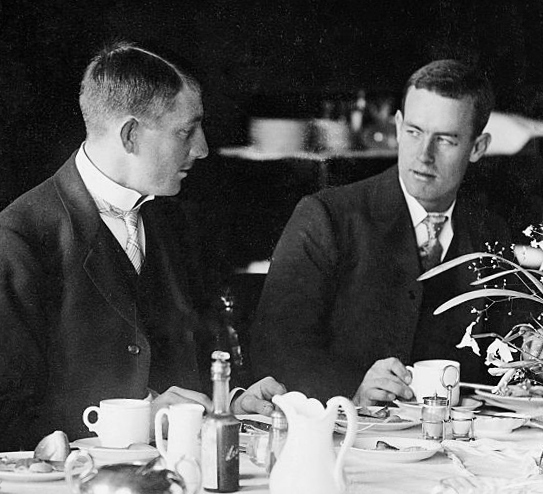
Armstrong (left) and Trumper during the tour of England in 1905

Armstrong was appointed captain of an Australian side that toured New Zealand from February to April 1910, partly as recognition of his accomplishments and partly due to the unavailability of other candidates, such as Trumper. Suspicions still ran high between the Board and the players and Trumper, tiring of what he perceived as persecution, retired from first-class cricket. The tour did not include any Test matches, although a match was played against a representative New Zealand team. Australia won every game, save a draw against Canterbury. Armstrong, more diplomatic as captain than some commenters had been expecting, turned down a lucrative offer to coach the Auckland team.

The Melbourne Cricket Club found Armstrong a job as "pavilion clerk". His duties were broadly defined in order to allow him to meet his representative cricket obligations. These included matches against the touring South Africans, scheduled to play five Tests in 1910–11. The first Test saw Australia win by an innings and 114 runs thanks mainly to an innings on 191 from Hill and eight wickets to Bill Whitty. Armstrong nearly missed the second Test in Melbourne with a case of mumps. He recovered, and although still unwell managed to score 75 and take 4–134 from 48 overs. In the fourth Test, Armstrong compiled another century, 132 including a partnership of 154 with Hill. Australia won the series comfortably, winning four of the five Test matches with their only loss at Adelaide by 38 runs. Returning to cricket after his self-imposed exile, Victor Trumper was the leading player for the Australians during the series scoring 661 runs at an average of 94.

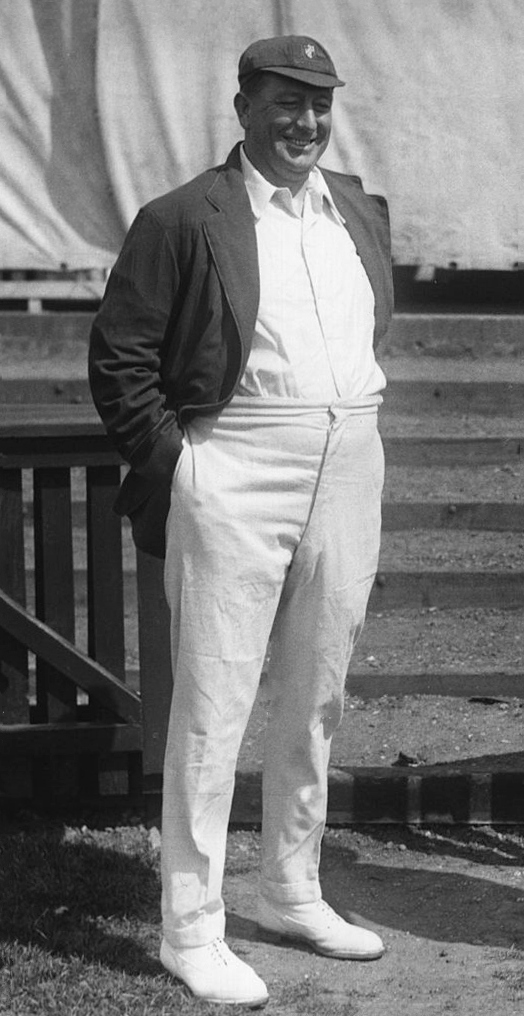
Armstrong as captain of the Australian team in Leicester in 1921

The English team returned to Australia the following season to compete for the Ashes with Pelham Warner once again captain of a very strong English team that included bowlers Sydney Barnes and Frank Foster. Warner suffered from an illness early in the tour and handed the captaincy to Johnny Douglas. After losing the first Test, England won the remaining four Tests comfortably. In the second Test at Melbourne, Armstrong played one of his best Test innings. Facing exceptional bowling from Foster and Barnes, he made a nerveless 90, including 14 boundaries, before being dismissed by Foster.

While this series took place, the Board of Control made plans to usurp the commonly accepted rights of the players to appoint a manager when touring England. The hostility between the players and the board saw a fist fight break out between Clem Hill and Peter McAlister at a selection meeting. When the Board announced that George Crouch would be manager of the Australian team for the 1912 Triangular Tournament in England, rather than the player's choice, Frank Laver, outright rebellion ensued. Armstrong, Hill and Trumper, along with Hanson Carter, Tibby Cotter and Vernon Ransford (known as the "Big Six") announced that they would be unavailable to join the touring party. The team, under the captaincy of Syd Gregory, left without these players. The tour was not a success on any front: the Australians winning only eight games and losing nine in a wet season and Crouch on return to Australia reported to the Board that "some of the players had conducted themselves so badly in England as to lead to the team being socially ostracised."

International cricket was placed on hold as a result of the outbreak of the Great War. Armstrong had been named captain of the Australian team to tour South Africa in 1914–15, however the tour was unable to take place. Armstrong chose not to enlist in the military during the war and kept his own counsel on the subject. He continued to work and play cricket for Melbourne Cricket Club, participating in the occasional fund-raising fixture.

=== Captain ===
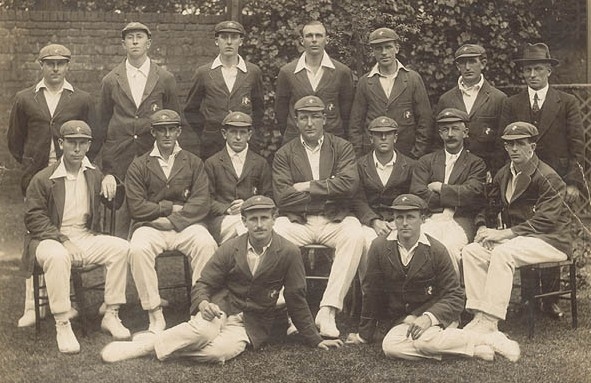
Armstrong (centre, middle row) with his 1921 team, considered one of the great Test teams of all time.

When international cricket resumed after the Great War, Armstrong, now over forty years of age, was appointed captain of a strong Australian team boosted by the inclusion of players such as Jack Gregory and Herbie Collins who had starred in the Australian Imperial Forces cricket team. Armstrong was much older than many of his teammates and was the subject of some awe; Gregory describing him as "my ideal cricketer". The touring English team, captained once again by Johnny Douglas was no match for the Australians, who won all five Tests in the 1920–21 series, completing the first and only Ashes whitewash for 86 years on 1 March. Armstrong was masterful throughout the Test series. He scored 474 runs at an average of over 77 including three centuries; 158 in Sydney, 121 in Adelaide and 123 not out in Melbourne. Before going out to bat in the second innings at Sydney, he was seen, "padded up, [drinking] whisky with his mates at the members' bar".

Armstrong remained unpopular with the Board of Control. Despite Armstrong's triumphs, it was reported that he was only appointed captain of the 1921 Australian team to tour England by "the narrowest possible margin". On the voyage to England, Armstrong attempted to lose some weight by spending some time each day in the stokehold of the ship. On arrival, however, he weighed in 4 pounds (2 kg) heavier. Against English teams badly affected by the Great War, the Australians dominated the series. Armstrong marshalled his troops well, utilising Gregory and Ted McDonald to devastating effect. Australia won the first Test in two days, the second Test by lunch on the third day and the third Test and the Ashes by 5.00 pm on the third day. Throughout the tour, Armstrong fought a series of running battles against the Board appointed manager, Syd Smith, on behalf of his men. Smith, looking to cut overheads, had suggested boarding with wealthy cricket devotees; Armstrong dismissed the idea.

The fourth Test at Old Trafford was famous for two events, both involving Armstrong. The first day's play was washed out and England commenced their innings the following day, the match now a two-day affair. Lionel Tennyson, the English captain, declared his innings closed with twenty minutes of play left in the day. The Australian wicket-keeper, Sammy Carter pointed out to Armstrong that a declaration at that time in a two-day match was against the laws of cricket as they stood at that time. Armstrong protested to the umpires and England were forced to continue batting. In the commotion, Armstrong managed to bowl two overs in succession, an action also against the laws of cricket.

By the fifth Test, the Australian team was in sight of being the first Australian team to remain unbeaten throughout a tour of England. Once again, much of the first day was lost to rain. Determined not to lose, Armstrong attempted to delay commencement after the rain and was heckled by English supporters. He told his three main bowlers, "I won't ask you not to get a man out, but as long as Mead (a notoriously slow scoring batsman) remains at the wicket we can't be beaten". In the last three hours of the Test, Armstrong decided to rest his key bowlers and allowed his part-time bowlers to rotate as they pleased and fielders to configure themselves. During this time, Armstrong picked up a newspaper that had been blown across the field and began to read. When asked about this later, Armstrong was said to have replied, "I wanted to see who we were playing", although this is claimed to be apocryphal. The Australians drew the Test and won the series three–nil, however they could not maintain their unbeaten record, losing by 28 runs to an English XI at Eastbourne and again to C. I. Thornton's XI at Scarborough.

Despite the two losses, the tour was a triumph for Armstrong. Personally, he achieved the 1,000 runs and 100 wickets milestone for the third time in an English summer. About his captaincy, former rival Frank Foster said, "I honestly think that Australia have got to thank one man, one man only for their success. That man is Warwick Armstrong, probably one of the best captains ever sent to England from Australia". On return to Australia, Armstrong was greeted by large enthusiastic crowds and acclaimed at many public receptions. At one reception, he was presented with a £2,500 cheque by the Prime Minister of Australia Billy Hughes.

If ever there was a man singled out as a king of sport it was Mr. Armstrong, who had gone out to give the people of England a chance to regain the Ashes and who had returned, like Imperial Caesar, who came, saw and conquered.

— Billy Hughes

== Outside cricket ==
The 1921 tour was Armstrong's swan song in first-class cricket. On the journey back to Australia, he suffered a relapse of the malaria that had plagued him since his earlier visit to Malaya. This kept him from taking part in any of the matches in South Africa, allowing Herbie Collins to captain Australia for the first time. Armstrong resigned from his job with Melbourne Cricket Club and drawing on contacts he had made while on tour took a role as an agent for Dawson's Scotch Whisky. He remained in the liquor trade until his retirement in 1946. Armstrong also applied his cricket background acting as a cricket journalist for the Sydney Evening News. His copy was promoted as "frank and fearless" and was generally contemptuous of much of the cricket and cricketers he saw, especially of what he saw as dull cricket.

In 1922, he wrote a primer on cricket titled The Art of Cricket published by Methuen & Co, London.

In July 1913, he married Aileen O'Donnell, the daughter of a wealthy Irish Australian pastoralist with large land holdings in the Riverina region of New South Wales. The couple met while Armstrong was representing the Melbourne Cricket Club in a match against a Wagga Wagga XV. Armstrong and his new wife settled in Melbourne, moving to the Sydney suburb of Edgecliff for business reasons in 1935. Aileen died of a thrombosis in 1940. Armstrong, following illness that saw him lose much of the weight that he was known for, died on 13 July 1947, leaving an estate to the value of £90,000. His funeral was held at St Joseph's Catholic Church in Edgecliff and proceeded to the South Head Cemetery. He was survived by his son, Warwick Geoffrey.

Armstrong was an all-round sportsman, playing Australian rules football in the winter for South Melbourne in the Victorian Football League (VFL), the premier competition in the state, from 1898 to 1900. A slim utility, he played 16 games for the club, scoring 18 goals. He played in South Melbourne's losing 1899 VFL Grand Final team defeated by Fitzroy by one point.

== Style and personality ==
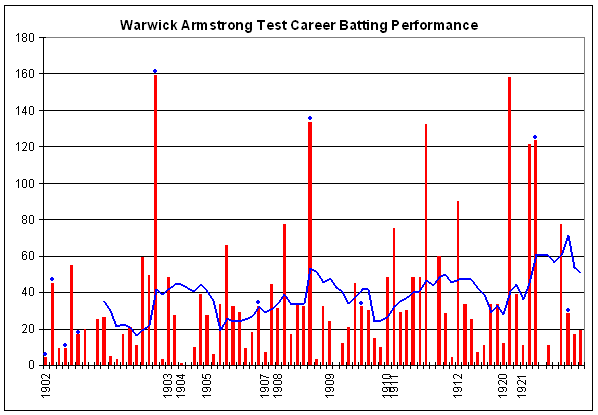
An innings-by-innings breakdown of Armstrong's Test match batting career, showing runs scored (red bars) and the average of the last 10 innings (blue line).

Although slim as a young man, Armstrong grew into a big man, weighing 133 kilograms (293 lb) and being 190 centimetres (6 foot 3 inches) tall. As a result, he acquired the nickname "The Big Ship". His oversize shirt, measuring 26 centimetres (10 in) by 85 centimetres (33 in) and his shoes, 32 centimetres (13 in) long by 18 centimetres (7 in) wide are on display at the Australian Cricket Hall of Fame. A story told of Armstrong had a young boy following him around at a tour match in Southampton. Armstrong, thinking it a manifestation of hero worship, offered to sign the boy's autograph book. The boy turned to Armstrong and said, "Please, sir, you are the only bit of decent shade in the place."

As a batsman, Armstrong was not a stylist. The Times, in describing Armstrong's batting after he scored his maiden century against Sussex in 1902 said, "Mr. Armstrong's methods were not attractive".

His pose at the wickets gives an impression of awkwardness which is not dispelled when he shapes to play the ball and his strokeplay is essentially laboured ... His methods, however, are remarkably effective; they show a most admirable blend of aggression and caution, backed by the right temperament. His defence is very sound, watchful and painstaking, his strokeplay is limited in its variety, but very sound in its execution.

— Leslie Poidevin, journalist

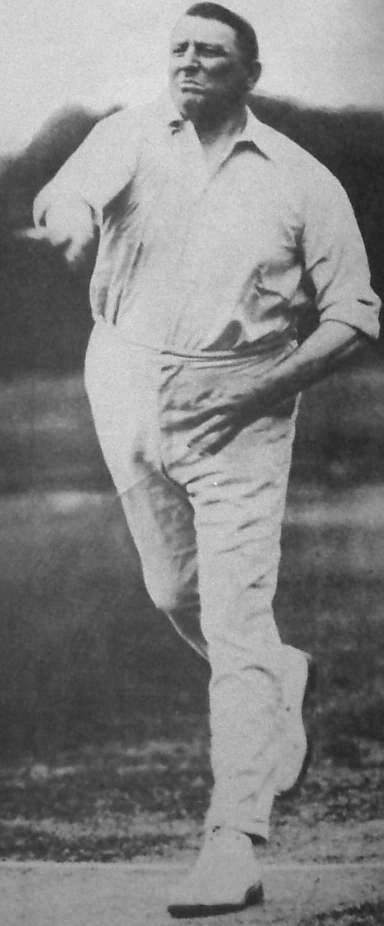
Armstrong lumbers up to the crease to bowl.

Armstrong was tireless as a leg break bowler and was known for his ability to land the ball on any point of the pitch he liked. His action imparted as much topspin as leg spin, making it difficult for batsman to detect his "straight-breaks". Early in his career, he bowled negative leg theory but later used his accuracy to great effect, bowling an over or two of leg breaks and then the straight one in the hope of bowling the batsman or receiving a leg before wicket dismissal. His action consisted of an easy amble and a gentle arc and was described in the Sporting Life as "rather like a fat uncle, not altogether unlike a fat aunt." It was effective, however, with the Daily Telegraph stating after the first Test in 1921, "there is not a single batsman in England who faces with any appearance of confidence his innocuous slows."

Armstrong was renowned for his gamesmanship and was willing to push the boundaries of what was considered acceptable behaviour in order to obtain an advantage for his team. In 1909, the English all-rounder Frank Woolley was making his Test début against the Australians at the Oval. Taking advantage of a rule that allowed bowlers to bowl trial balls or "looseners", Armstrong kept Woolley waiting nervously for more than fifteen minutes while he bowled trial balls alongside the pitch. In a club game against St Kilda, Armstrong claimed a catch in the slips, only to have the umpire refuse the dismissal. It was the last ball of the over and as the field changed, Armstrong brusquely inquired why this was so. Informed that the ball had struck the batsman's pads, Armstrong then appealed for a leg before wicket dismissal, which the umpire then upheld.

Armstrong was not a "walker"; he believed in waiting for the umpire to make a decision, once telling the English cricketer Arthur Gilligan, "The more you play this game, the more you will find out that you will be given out many times when you are not out and vice versa". English professional cricketers took a dim view of Armstrong's approach to the game. Jack Hobbs, describing one instance said,

The chief offender was Warwick Armstrong, who got very nasty and unsportsmanlike, refusing to accept the umpire's decision. That upset me. I did not know if I was standing on my head or my heels with the consequence that two balls later I let one go, never even attempting to play it; and it bowled me. I still bear this incident in mind against Armstrong.

== Notes ==
Preceded by Syd Gregory	Australian Test cricket captain 1920/21–1921	Succeeded by Herbie Collins
