= William Hannah =

Australian cricket umpire (1867–1942)

William Hannah (1867 – 18 October 1942 in Melbourne) was an Australian Test cricket umpire.

Hannah umpired 15 first-class matches between 1905 and 1912, including four Test matches. His first Test, between Australia and England at the Sydney Cricket Ground on 13 December to 19 December 1907, was a close affair, won by Australia by 2 wickets after they were 7 wickets down with 90 runs to get. Hannah's last Test, between Australia and South Africa at the Melbourne Cricket Ground on 17 February to 21 February 1911, was won by Australia by a massive 530 runs, the highest Test margin to that date.

Hannah was involved in sport and its administration all his life. He took up cricket umpiring after playing first-grade cricket in the Victorian Cricket Association for several seasons. After playing Australian rules football he served as president of Fitzroy Football Club from 1931 to 1936 and was a committeeman or active member of the club for more than 50 years. He was president of Fitzroy Bowling Club at the time of his death, and had played a game of competition bowls the day before he died.

Hannah married Jessie Elder in Melbourne in January 1898. He died at his home in the Melbourne suburb of Ivanhoe in October 1942 aged 75, survived by Jessie and their two sons and a daughter.

== See also ==
- List of Test umpires
