= Frank Laver =

Australian cricketer (1869–1919)

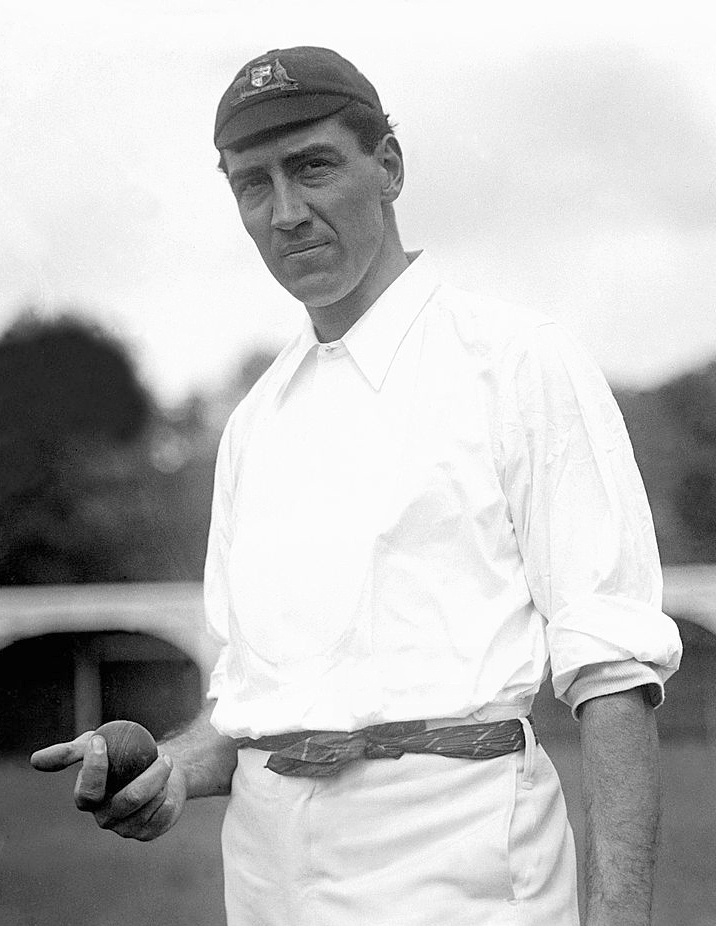
- Laver, c. 1905

Personal information
- Born: 7 December 1869; Castlemaine, Victoria, Australia
- Died: 24 September 1919 (aged 49); East Melbourne, Victoria, Australia
- Batting: Right-handed
- Bowling: Right-arm medium

International information
- National side: Australia
- Test debut (cap 78): 1 June 1899 v England
- Last Test: 9 August 1909 v England

Career statistics
Competition	Test	First-class
Matches	15	163
Runs scored	196	5,434
Batting average	11.52	25.04
100s/50s	0/0	6/18
Top score	45	164
Balls bowled	2,361	23,089
Wickets	37	404
Bowling average	26.05	24.72
5 wickets in innings	2	19
10 wickets in match	0	5
Best bowling	8/31	8/31
Catches/stumpings	8/–	147/–
- Source: CricketArchive, 1 February 2020

Frank Jonas Laver (7 December 1869 – 24 September 1919) was an Australian cricketer and baseball player. He played in 15 Test matches between 1899 and 1909 and visited England as a player and team manager on four occasions. An accomplished photographer and author, he wrote an illustrated account of his 1899 and 1905 tours of England, An Australian Cricketer on Tour.

== Cricket career ==
The son of Jonas Laver, grazier and timber merchant, and Mary Ann, née Fry, Frank Laver was the 78th player to represent Australia. He was a right-hand batsman and right-arm medium pace bowler. In his first season with the East Melbourne Cricket Club, as a gangling six-footer from the country, he took 94 wickets and made three centuries, and held his place in the club for 25 years. In the 1892/93 season he scored more than 1000 runs for his club, including a record 352 not out. Batting with his friend and fellow Test player Peter McAlister in 1903/04 season, Laver scored 341 in a club record score of 2 for 744 in one afternoon's batting. Laver and McAlister later fell out over the management of overseas tours.

Pollard described Laver as "crude and unorthodox, [who] could thrash even classy attacks. He was a plucky fieldsman whose bowling was highly suited to the heavy atmosphere and damp pitches of England."

His first Test match was between Australia and England at Trent Bridge, Nottingham on 1 to 3 June 1899. This match, the first to be played at Trent Bridge, was drawn with England needing 135 runs to win and Australia requiring 3 wickets. Laver's contribution was a modest 3 runs in each innings and a catch. The match was also notable as being W. G. Grace's last Test, and the first for Victor Trumper and Wilfred Rhodes.

Laver's fortunes turned in the next Test match, at Lord's in London, where his three wickets in the second innings clinched an Australian victory by 10 wickets.

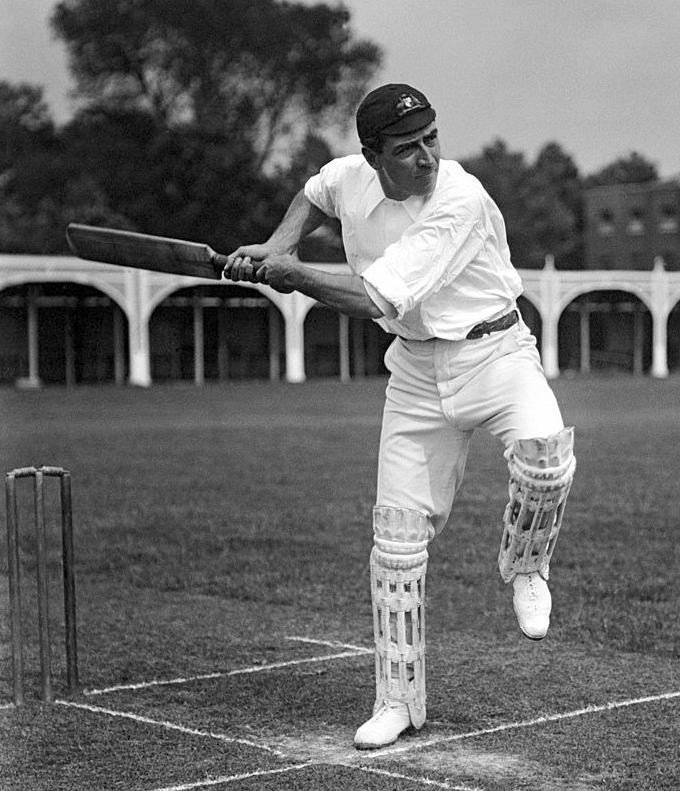
Frank Laver c. 1905

In the 1905 tour of England, Laver was appointed player-manager by the Australian Board of Control, and finished second in the bowling averages, taking 115 wickets at an average of 18.19. Pollard described him as "a cricketer of character and perception, [who] could encourage aspiring players to great heights." He was again appointed player-manager for the 1909 tour of England. At the end of the tour Laver refused to produce his records of the trip, insisting that he kept books only for the players' benefit.

In the Test match at Old Trafford, Manchester on 26 to 28 July 1909, Laver had, in Wisden's words "a great day against England", taking 8 wickets for 31 runs in the first innings. "English batsmen considered him a very good but not an exceptional bowler, and often wondered why they fared so badly against him", said Wisden. This was a record performance in a Test match at Old Trafford, equalled by Fred Trueman in 1952, until Jim Laker's extraordinary 10 for 53 and 9 for 37 in 1956.

Laver's last Test match was between Australia and England at The Oval, Kennington, London on 9 to 11 August 1909, another drawn match with England needing 208 runs with 7 wickets in hand. Laver was 8 not out in his only innings, and took 0 wickets for 13 runs in 8 overs.

When another manager was appointed to lead the Australians to England in 1912, six senior players declared that they were unavailable unless Laver was reinstated. The Board of Control remained unmoved and, in spite of a heated selectors' meeting in which punches were thrown, Laver remained out favour with the Board. "Any suggestion that the players could have a free hand in selecting the manager was so much poppycock", declared Moyes. However, he managed a non-Test tour of New Zealand in the 1913/14 season.

Altogether, Laver played 163 first-class matches in his career between 1891 and 1914.

== Baseball career ==
Laver was a prominent baseball player and member of first ever Australia national baseball team. He participated in the 1897 Kangaroo Tour of the United States, which was the first time an Australian baseball team had played in the US. He went on to become the president of the Victorian Baseball League (1915–19) and vice-president of the Victorian Baseball Union. He was recognised for his contribution to Australian baseball with his induction into the Baseball Australia Hall of Fame in 2005.

== Personal life ==
He married Katie Myrtle Adele Major at Kiama, New South Wales in 1914, and had two children. He died of a cerebral haemorrhage. At the time of his death he was living in Kew, Victoria and his occupation was given as a manufacturer.

His nephew Jack Laver played 13 first-class matches for Tasmania between 1946 and 1952. He is also related to tennis star Rod Laver.

== See also ==
- Rudolph Laver

== Sources ==
- Moyes, A. G., Australian Cricket: A History, Sydney, Angus & Robertson, 1959.
- Pollard, Jack, Australian Cricket: 1893–1917, The Turbulent Years. Sydney, The Book Company, 1995. (ISBN 0-207-15468-6)
- Pollard, Jack, Australian Cricket: The game and the players. Sydney, Hodder & Stoughton, 1982. (ISBN 0-340-28796-9)
- Wisden Cricketers' Almanack, 1920 edition (obituary)
