= Philip Argall =

Australian cricket umpire (1855–1912)

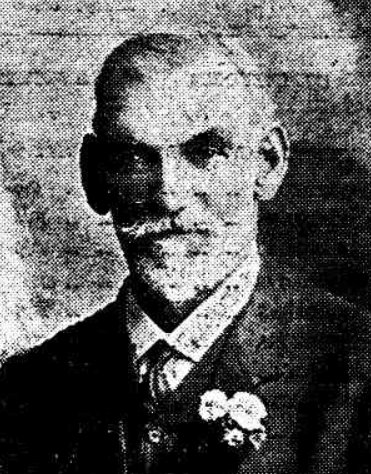
Philip Argall

Philip Argall (27 February 1855 at Adelaide, South Australia – 3 April 1912 at Adelaide, South Australia) was an Australian Test cricket umpire. His Wisden obituary described him as "one of the best of Australian umpires".

== Life and career ==
Argall was born in Adelaide and lived all his life there. He learned the bootmaking trade and later became the manager of the Co-Operative Bootmaking Company.

Argall umpired seven Test matches between Australia and England between 1902 and 1908. His first match, at Adelaide on 17 January to 23 January 1902, was a close affair, eventually won by Australia who successfully chased 314 in the fourth innings, and notable for Clem Hill's dismissal in the 90s in both innings. In all his matches, Argall was partnered by Bob Crockett who had a high opinion of him. Argall's last match was at Melbourne on 7 February to 11 February 1908, a match won comfortably by Australia with Warwick Armstrong scoring a century and Jack Saunders taking 9 wickets for the match.

Argall was a wicket-keeper and batsman in senior Adelaide cricket before he took up umpiring. He umpired 39 first-class matches, all of them in Australia, between 1894 and 1909. He was a founder and the chairman of the Junior Cricket Association in Adelaide, and when it merged to become part of the new Adelaide and Suburban Association he served as chairman of that body too. He was also involved in the administration of Association football.

Argall died in Adelaide in April 1912, leaving two sons and a daughter. His wife Marcella had died in November 1908.

== See also ==
- Australian Test Cricket Umpires
- List of Test umpires
