= List of New South Wales cricket records =

This is a list of records for the New South Wales cricket team.

== First-class records ==
=== Individual records ===
==== Most matches played ====
Rank	Matches	Player	Period
1	135	Greg Matthews	1982/83 – 1997/98
2	120	Phil Emery	1987/88 – 1998/99
3	115	Geoff Lawson	1977/78 – 1991/92
4	108	Mark Waugh	1985/86 – 2003/04
5	107	Steve Rixon	1974/75 – 1987/88
Source: . Last accessed: 8 October 2009.

==== Most catches (fielder) ====
Rank	Catches	Player	Matches
1	122	Mark Taylor	88
2	116	Mark Waugh	96
3	102	Greg Matthews	117
4	92	Richie Benaud	73
5	91	Rick McCosker	70
Source: . Last accessed: 8 October 2009

==== Most dismissals ====
Rank	Dismissals	Player	Matches
1	339 (298 c. 41 st.)	Phil Emery	109
2	260 (240 c. 20 st.)	Brad Haddin	79
3	259 (218 c. 41 st.)	Steve Rixon	94
4	211 (179 c. 32 st.)	Brian Taber	64
5	179 (109 c. 70 st.)	Bert Oldfield	52
Source: . Last accessed: 8 October 2009

=== Team records ===
==== Highest team totals ====
Rank	Runs	Opponent	Venue	Season
1	918	South Australia	Sydney Cricket Ground, Sydney	1900–01
2	839	Tasmania	Sydney Cricket Ground, Sydney	1898–99
3	815	Victoria	Sydney Cricket Ground, Sydney	1908–09
4	807	South Australia	Adelaide Oval, Adelaide	1899–1900
5	805	Victoria	Melbourne Cricket Ground, Melbourne	1905–06
Source: . Last accessed: 8 October 2009.

==== Lowest team totals ====
Rank	Runs	Opponent	Venue	Season
1	37	Victoria	The Domain, Sydney	1868–69
2	42	Victoria	Melbourne Cricket Ground, Melbourne	1859–60
3	44	Victoria	Melbourne Cricket Ground, Melbourne	1859–60
4	44	Victoria	The Domain, Sydney	1860–61
5	44	Victoria	Albert Cricket Ground, Sydney	1872–73
Source: . Last accessed: 8 October 2009.

==== Greatest win margins (by innings) ====
Rank	Margin	Opponent	Venue	Season
1	Innings and 605 runs	South Australia	Sydney Cricket Ground, Sydney	1900–01
2	Innings and 527 runs	South Australia	Adelaide Oval, Adelaide	1908–09
3	Innings and 487 runs	Tasmania	Sydney Cricket Ground, Sydney	1898–1899
4	Innings and 392 runs	South Australia	Adelaide Oval, Adelaide	1899-1900
5	Innings and 384 runs	New Zealanders	Sydney Cricket Ground, Sydney	1898–99
Source: . Last accessed: 8 October 2009.

==== Greatest win margins (by runs) ====
Rank	Margin	Opponent	Venue	Season
1	685 runs	Queensland	Sydney Cricket Ground, Sydney	1929–30
2	638 runs	South Australia	Adelaide Oval, Adelaide	1920–21
3	541 runs	South Australia	Sydney Cricket Ground, Sydney	1925–26
4	456 runs	Victoria	Sydney Cricket Ground, Sydney	1910–11
5	404 runs	Queensland	Sydney Cricket Ground, Sydney	1940–41
Source: . Last accessed: 8 October 2009.

=== Batting records ===
==== Highest individual scores ====
Rank	Runs	Player	Opponent	Venue	Season
1	452*	Don Bradman	Queensland	Sydney Cricket Ground, Sydney	1929–30
2	383	Charles Gregory	Queensland	Brisbane Exhibition Ground, Brisbane	1906–07
3	359	Bob Simpson	Queensland	Brisbane Exhibition Ground, Brisbane	1963–64
4	340*	Don Bradman	Victoria	Sydney Cricket Ground, Sydney	1928–29
5	321	Billy Murdoch	Victoria	Sydney Cricket Ground, Sydney	1881–82
Source: . Last accessed: 8 October 2009.

==== Most career runs ====
Rank	Runs	Player	Career
1	8,174 (163 inns.)	Michael Bevan	1989/90 – 2003/04
2	7,425 (164 inns.)	Mark Waugh	1985/86 – 2003/04
3	6,636 (149 inns.)	Steve Waugh	1983/84 – 2003/04
4	6,170 (153 inns.)	Mark Taylor	1985/86 – 1998/99
5	6,127 (99 inns.)	Alan Kippax	1918/19 – 1934/35
Source: . Last updated: 9 October 2009.

==== Most runs in a season ====
Rank	Runs	Player	Average	Season
1	1,506 (17 inns.)	Simon Katich	94.12	2007–08
2	1,240 (20 inns.)	Michael Bevan	82.66	1993–94
3	1,191 (19 inns.)	Phil Jaques	66.16	2004–05
4	1,109 (20 inns.)	Dirk Wellham	73.93	1982–83
5	1,096 (21 inns.)	Rick McCosker	60.88	1982–83
Source: . Last updated: 9 October 2009.

==== Highest batting averages ====
Rank	Average	Player	Career
1	100.97 (56 inns.)	Don Bradman	1927/28 – 1933/34
2	71.26 (68 inns.)	Simon Katich	2001/02 – 2008/09
3	68.07 (99 inns.)	Alan Kippax	1918/19 – 1934/35
4	68.00 (81 inns.)	Monty Noble	1894/95 – 1908/09
5	66.17 (27 inns.)	Phillip Hughes	2007/08 – 2008/2009
Qualification: 20 innings. Source: . Last updated: 9 October 2009.

==== Most centuries ====
Rank	Centuries	Player	Matches
1	32	Michael Bevan	93
2	23	Alan Kippax	63
3	23	Mark Waugh	96
4	22	Steve Waugh	86
5	19	Monty Noble	51
Source: . Last updated: 9 Oct 2009.

=== Bowling records ===
==== Most career wickets ====
Rank	Wickets	Player	Matches	Average
1	367	Geoff Lawson	103	23.63
2	363	Greg Matthews	117	29.04
3	328	Stuart MacGill	86	34.26
4	290	Doug Bollinger	89	28.15
5	266	Richie Benaud	73	26.96
Source: . Last updated: 6 February 2018.

==== Most wickets in a season ====
Rank	Wickets	Player	Matches	Season
1	54	Stuart MacGill	11	2004–05
2	52	Bill O'Reilly	6	1939–40
3	49	Greg Matthews	11	1991–92
4	48	David Hourn	9	1977–78
5	48	Stuart MacGill	10	2002–03
Source: . Last updated: 12 October 2009.

==== Best career average ====
Rank	Average	Player	Balls	Wickets
1	17.18	Bill O'Reilly	11,105	207
2	18.09	Pat Crawford	1,104	61
3	19.08	Charlie Turner	3,920	73
4	19.30	Clem Hill	3,032	40
5	19.52	Andrew Newell	2,164	40
Qualification: 2000 balls bowled. Source: . Last updated: 12 October 2009.

==== Best figures in an innings ====
Rank	Figures	Player	Opponent	Venue	Season
1	9–41	Bill O'Reilly	South Australia	Adelaide Oval, Adelaide	1937–38
2	9–50	Bill O'Reilly	Victoria	Melbourne Cricket Ground, Melbourne	1933–34
3	9–52	Bill Howell	Victoria	Melbourne Cricket Ground, Melbourne	1902–03
4	9–77	David Hourn	Victoria	Sydney Cricket Ground, Sydney	1978–79
5	9–83	Bob Holland	South Australia	Sydney Cricket Ground, Sydney	1983–84
Source: . Last updated: 12 October 2009.

==== Best figures in a match ====
Rank	Bowling	Player	Opponent	Venue	Season
1	15–125	Tom McKibbin	South Australia	Adelaide Oval, Adelaide	1896–97
2	14–45	Bill O'Reilly	Queensland	Sydney Cricket Ground, Sydney	1938–39
3	14–98	Bill O'Reilly	South Australia	Adelaide Oval, Adelaide	1936–37
4	14–189	Tom McKibbin	South Australia	Sydney Cricket Ground, Sydney	1894–95
5	13–87	Ranji Hordern	Victoria	Sydney Cricket Ground, Sydney	1910–11
Source: . Last updated: 12 October 2009.

== List A records ==
=== Individual records ===
==== Most matches played ====
Rank	Matches	Player	Period
1	88	Brad Haddin	1999–2013
2	85	Stuart Clark	1997–2011
3	78	Dominic Thornely	2002–2011
4	72	Doug Bollinger	2003–2017
5	69	Nathan Bracken	1998–2010
Source: . Last updated: 12 September 2018.

==== Most catches (fielder) ====
Rank	Catches	Player	Matches
1	42	Mark Waugh	69
2	31	Shane Lee	59
3	29	Mark Taylor	44
4	29	Nic Maddinson	56
5	28	Moises Henriques	68
Source: . Last updated: 12 September 2018.

==== Most dismissals ====
Rank	Dismissals	Player	Matches
1	158 (123 c. 35 st.)	Brad Haddin	88
2	95 (86 c. 9 st.)	Peter Nevill	61
3	85 (73 c. 12 st.)	Phil Emery	61
4	31 (25 c. 6 st.)	Steve Rixon	25
5	21 (19 c. 2 st.)	Daniel Smith	30
Source: . Last updated: 12 September 2018.

=== Team records ===
==== Highest team totals ====
Rank	Runs	Opponent	Venue	Season
1	397–4	Tasmania	Bankstown Oval, Sydney	2001–02
2	350	Victoria	North Sydney Oval, Sydney	2012-13
3	338-3	Cricket Australia XI	Bankstown Oval, Sydney	2015-16
4	332–8	Cricket Australia XI	Hurstville Oval, Sydney	2017-18
5	328-6	Cricket Australia XI	Hurstville Oval, Sydney	2016-17
Source: . Last updated: 12 September 2018.

==== Greatest win margins (by runs) ====
Rank	Margin	Opponent	Venue	Season
1	279 runs	Cricket Australia XI	Bankstown Oval, Sydney	2015-16
2	156 runs	South Australia	North Sydney Oval, Sydney	2015-16
3	153 runs	Queensland	Brisbane Cricket Ground, Brisbane	1987-88
4	146 runs	Queensland	Drummoyne Oval, Sydney	2015-16
5	144 runs	Queensland	Brisbane Cricket Ground, Brisbane	2005–06
Source: . Last updated: 12 September 2018.

=== Batting records ===
==== Highest individual score ====
Rank	Runs	Player	Opponent	Venue	Season
1	197	David Warner	Victoria	North Sydney Oval, Sydney	2013-14
2	179*	Daniel Smith	Victoria	North Sydney Oval, Sydney	2011-12
3	171*	Phil Jaques	Queensland	Sydney Cricket Ground, Sydney	2009-10
4	165*	David Warner	Tasmania	Hurstville Oval, Sydney	2008–09
5	164*	Moises Henriques	Cricket Australia XI	Hurstville Oval, Sydney	2016-17
Source: . Last updated: 12 September 2018.

==== Most career runs ====
Rank	Runs	Player	Career
1	2,724 (86 inns.)	Brad Haddin	1998/99 – 2013/14
2	2,454 (59 inns.)	Michael Bevan	1989/90 – 2002/03
3	2,341 (64 inns.)	Phil Jaques	2001/02 – 2010/11
4	2,293 (55 inns.)	Steve Waugh	1983/84 – 2003/04
5	2,173 (69 inns.)	Mark Waugh	1985/86 – 2003/04
Source: . Last updated: 12 September 2018.

==== Highest batting averages ====
Rank	Average	Player	Career
1	62.92 (59 inns.)	Michael Bevan	1989/90 – 2002/03
2	55.67 (41 inns.)	Steve Smith	2007/08 – present
3	52.11 (55 inns.)	Steve Waugh	1984/85 – 2003/04
4	44.57 (21 inns.)	Rick McCosker	1973/74 – 1983/84
5	42.90 (35 inns.)	David Warner	2001/02 – present
Qualification: 20 innings. Source: . Last updated: 12 September 2018.
