= 1977–78 Sheffield Shield season =

Australian cricket tournament

- Cricket format: First-class
- Tournament format: Double round-robin
- Champions: Western Australia (7th title)
- Participants: 6
- Matches: 25
- Player of the series: David Ogilvie (Queensland)
- Most runs: David Ogilvie (Queensland) (1060)
- Most wickets: David Hourn (New South Wales) (48)

The 1977–78 Sheffield Shield season was the 76th season of the Sheffield Shield, the domestic first-class cricket competition of Australia. Western Australia won the championship. Tasmania competed for the first time.

== Table ==
Team	Played	Won	Drawn	Lost	Batting points	Bowling points	Win points	Total Points
Western Australia	9	7	2	0	37	40	70	147
Queensland	9	4	4	1	43	38	40	121
Victoria	9	3	2	2	45	42	30	117
South Australia	9	2	3	4	19	30	20	82
New South Wales	9	1	2	6	32	38	10	80
Tasmania	5	0	3	2	32	21	0	54

== Statistics ==
=== Most Runs ===
David Ogilvie 1060

=== Most Wickets ===
David Hourn 48
