= 1947–48 Sheffield Shield season =

Australian cricket tournament

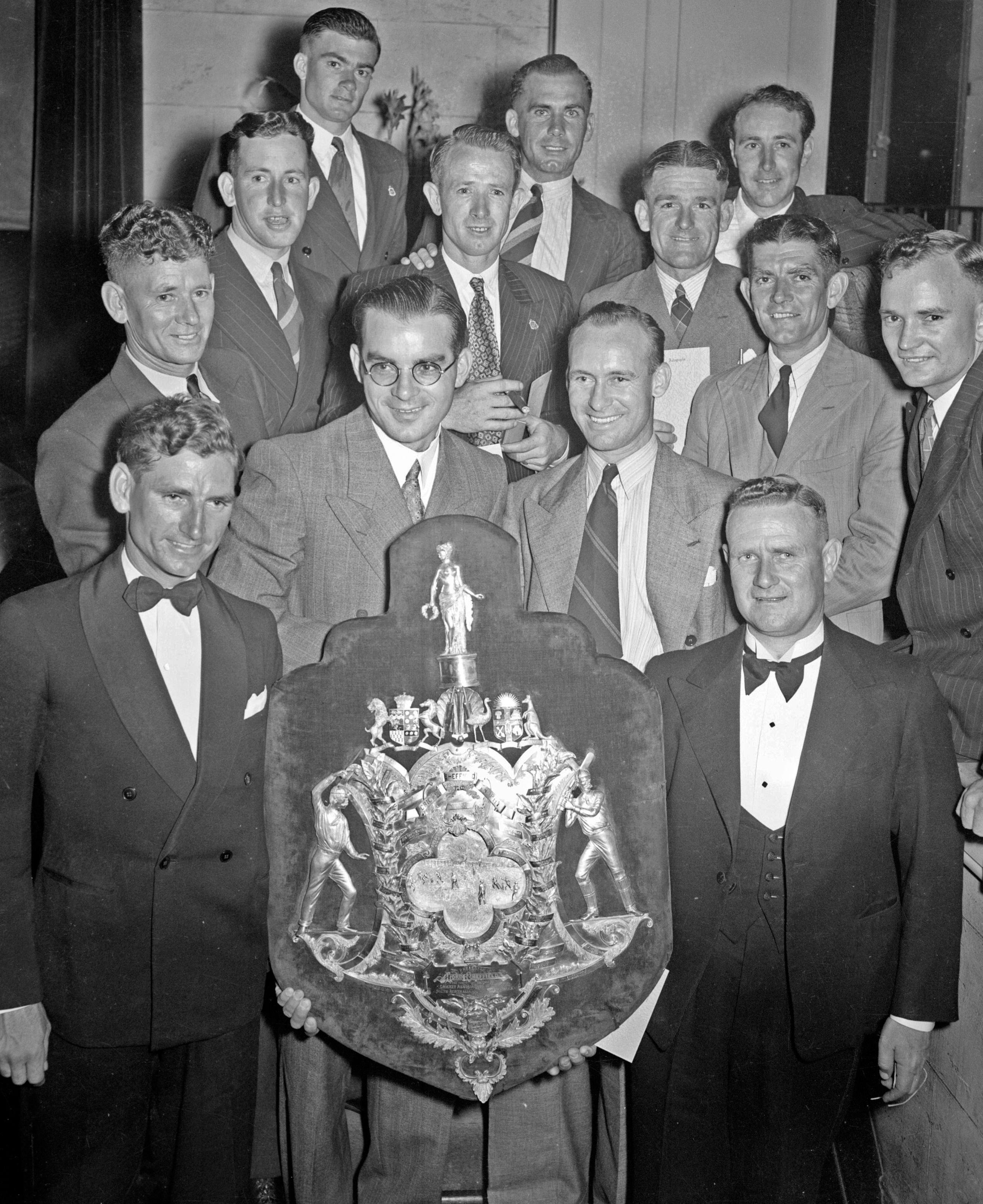
- Western Australia team with the 1948 Sheffield Shield
- Cricket format: First-class
- Tournament format: Double round-robin
- Champions: Western Australia (1st title)
- Participants: 5
- Matches: 16
- Most runs: Phil Ridings (South Australia) (649)
- Most wickets: Geff Noblet (South Australia) (35)

The 1947–48 Sheffield Shield season was the 46th season of the Sheffield Shield, the domestic first-class cricket competition of Australia. Western Australia won the championship on their debut season despite the fact that they only played four matches. The title was awarded to them based on their average.

== Table ==
Team	Played	Won	1st Inns Won	1st Inns Lost	Lost	Drawn	Points	Average
Western Australia	4	2	1	0	1	0	13	75.00
New South Wales	7	3	1	0	2	1	20	57.14
South Australia	7	3	0	1	3	0	16	42.85
Queensland	7	2	0	0	3	2	14	28.57
Victoria	7	2	0	1	3	1	13	28.57

== Statistics ==
=== Most runs ===
Phil Ridings 649

=== Most wickets ===
Geff Noblet 35
