= 1978–79 Sheffield Shield season =

Australian cricket tournament

- Cricket format: First-class
- Tournament format: Double round-robin
- Champions: Victoria (23rd title)
- Participants: 6
- Matches: 25
- Player of the series: Peter Sleep (South Australia)
- Most runs: Andrew Hilditch (New South Wales) (778)
- Most wickets: David Hourn (New South Wales) (40)

The 1978–79 Sheffield Shield season was the 77th season of the Sheffield Shield, the domestic first-class cricket competition of Australia. Victoria won the championship.

== Table ==
Team	Played	Won	Drawn	Lost	Batting points	Bowling points	Win points	Total Points
Victoria	9	4	3	2	32	38	40	110
Western Australia	9	3	5	1	28	36	30	94
New South Wales	9	3	4	2	30	32	30	92
Queensland	9	3	3	3	21	33	30	84
South Australia	9	1	3	5	18	29	10	57
Tasmania	5	1	2	2	18	19	18	55

== Statistics ==
=== Most Runs ===
Andrew Hilditch 778

=== Most Wickets ===
David Hourn 40

== See also ==
- 1978–79 Gillette Cup (Australia)
