= 1948–49 Sheffield Shield season =

Australian cricket tournament

- Cricket format: First-class
- Tournament format: Double round-robin
- Champions: New South Wales (23rd title)
- Participants: 5
- Matches: 16
- Most runs: Arthur Morris (New South Wales) (858)
- Most wickets: Geff Noblet (South Australia) (38) & Alan Walker (New South Wales) (38)

The 1948–49 Sheffield Shield season was the 47th season of the Sheffield Shield, the domestic first-class cricket competition of Australia. New South Wales won the championship. In March 1949, Donald Bradman played his final first-class match.

== Table ==
Team	Played	Won	1st Inns Won	1st Inns Lost	Lost	Points	Average
New South Wales	7	4	3	0	0	29	82.85
Victoria	7	3	2	1	1	22	62.85
Queensland	7	2	0	2	3	12	34.28
South Australia	7	2	0	2	3	12	34.28
Western Australia	4	0	0	0	4	0	00.00

== Statistics ==
=== Most Runs ===
Arthur Morris 858

=== Most Wickets ===
Geff Noblet & Alan Walker 38
