= John Stephens (Australian footballer) =

Australian rules footballer and cricketer

Personal information
- Full name: John Raymond Stephens
- Born: 15 September 1950 (age 76); East Melbourne, Victoria
- Original team: Sandringham (VFA)
- Debut: Round 1, 1971, St Kilda vs. Geelong, at Kardinia Park
- Height: 175 cm (5 ft 9 in)
- Weight: 76 kg (168 lb)

Playing career^{1}
| Years | Club | Games (Goals) |
| 1971–1973 | St Kilda | 43 (91) |
- ^{1} Playing statistics correct to the end of 1973.

Career highlights
- St Kilda Football Club leading goalkicker 1972

John Stephens
Cricket information
- Batting: Left-handed
- Role: Middle-order batsman

Domestic team information
- Years: Team
- 1970/71–1971/72: Victoria
- First-class debut: 11 December 1970 v Queensland
- Last First-class: 10 December 1971 v Western Australia
- Only List A: 5 December 1971 v Queensland

Career statistics
| Competition | First-class | List A |
|---|---|---|
| Matches | 4 | 1 |
| Runs scored | 123 | 1 |
| Batting average | 15.37 | 1.00 |
| 100s/50s | 0/0 | 0/0 |
| Top score | 48 | 1 |
| Catches/stumpings | 3/– | 1/– |
- Source: ESPNcricinfo, 26 December 2022

John Raymond Stephens (born 15 September 1950) is a former Australian rules footballer and cricketer during the early 1970s who played for St Kilda in the Victorian Football League (VFL) and also represented Victoria in first-class cricket.

Stephens was a goalkicking rover and, after managing eleven majors in a VFA game for Sandringham, was picked up by St Kilda.

He played the first six games of the 1971 VFL season before succumbing to a thigh injury which would keep him out of the side for the rest of the year. St Kilda made the Grand Final that year.

A consistent performer up forward, only four times in his league career did he fail to kick a goal in a game. Thanks to his solid finals performance in 1972, he managed to leapfrog Allan Davis, who was leading St Kilda's goal-kicking after the home-and-away season, with 53 goals for the year, including four in their Elimination Final win over Essendon; however, he again missed out on playing in the grand final when Carlton defeated the Saints in the preliminary final on the back of a seven-goal effort from football Legend Alex Jesaulenko.

As a cricketer, Stephens was a left-handed middle-order batsman and appeared in a total of four first-class matches in the 1970–71 and 1971–72 Sheffield Shield seasons. On his debut against Queensland at the MCG, he made his highest score of 48 in the second innings. Stephens finished his career with a disappointing 123 runs at an average of 15.37. He had played with fellow VFL footballers Peter Bedford, John Scholes and Max Walker.
