= 1964–65 Sheffield Shield season =

Australian cricket tournament

- Cricket format: First-class
- Tournament format: Double round-robin
- Champions: New South Wales (35th title)
- Participants: 5
- Matches: 20
- Most runs: Sam Trimble (Queensland) (924)
- Most wickets: Neil Hawke (South Australia) (41)

The 1964–65 Sheffield Shield season was the 63rd season of the Sheffield Shield, the domestic first-class cricket competition of Australia. New South Wales won the championship for the first time since their nine-year winning streak had ended two years prior, in the 1962–63 Sheffield Shield season.

== Table ==
Team	Played	Won	1st Inns Won	Drawn	1st Inns Lost	Lost	Points
New South Wales	8	4	2	0	3	0	34
Victoria	8	2	2	0	3	1	32
South Australia	8	2	1	0	2	3	32
Western Australia	8	2	2	0	1	3	24
Queensland	8	1	3	0	1	3	18

== Statistics ==
=== Most Runs ===
Sam Trimble 924

=== Most Wickets ===
Neil Hawke 41
