= 1955–56 Sheffield Shield season =

Australia cricket competition

- Cricket format: First-class
- Tournament format: Double round-robin
- Champions: New South Wales (28th title)
- Participants: 5
- Matches: 16
- Most runs: Jim Burke (New South Wales) (701)
- Most wickets: Pat Crawford (New South Wales) (33)

The 1955–56 Sheffield Shield season was the 54th season of the Sheffield Shield, the domestic first-class cricket competition of Australia. New South Wales won the championship for the third consecutive year.

== Table ==
Team	Played	Won	1st Inns Won	1st Inns Lost	Lost	Drawn	Points	Average
New South Wales	7	2	3	1	0	1	22	62.85
Victoria	7	2	2	2	0	1	20	57.14
Queensland	7	1	2	3	1	0	14	40.00
Western Australia	4	0	1	2	1	0	5	25.00
South Australia	7	0	2	2	3	0	8	22.85

== Statistics ==
=== Most Runs ===
Jim Burke 701

=== Most Wickets ===
Pat Crawford 33
