= 1951–52 Sheffield Shield season =

Australian cricket tournament

- Cricket format: First-class
- Tournament format(s): Double round-robin
- Champions: New South Wales (25th title)
- Participants: 5
- Matches: 16
- Most runs: Phil Ridings (South Australia) (533)
- Most wickets: Geff Noblet (South Australia) (39)

The 1951–52 Sheffield Shield season was the 50th season of the Sheffield Shield, the domestic first-class cricket competition of Australia. New South Wales won the championship.

== Table ==
Team	Played	Won	1st Inns Won	1st Inns Lost	Lost	Points	Average
New South Wales	7	3	4	0	2	27	77.14
Queensland	7	2	1	2	2	15	42.85
Victoria	7	2	1	2	2	15	42.85
South Australia	7	2	0	3	2	13	37.14
Western Australia	4	0	1	0	3	3	15.00

== Statistics ==
=== Most Runs ===
Phil Ridings 533

=== Most Wickets ===
Geff Noblet 39
