= 1954–55 Sheffield Shield season =

Australian cricket tournament

- Cricket format: First-class
- Tournament format: round-robin
- Champions: New South Wales (27th title)
- Participants: 5
- Matches: 9
- Most runs: Neil Harvey (Victoria) (401)
- Most wickets: Pat Crawford (New South Wales) (25)

The 1954–55 Sheffield Shield season was the 53rd season of the Sheffield Shield, the domestic first-class cricket competition of Australia. New South Wales won the championship. The matches were reduced to limit financial losses but the experiment proved to be false economy.

== Table ==
Team	Played	Won	1st Inns Won	1st Inns Lost	Lost	Drawn	Points	Average
New South Wales	4	2	1	0	1	0	13	65.00
Victoria	4	1	2	0	1	0	11	55.00
Western Australia	2	0	1	0	0	1	5	50.00
Queensland	4	1	0	2	1	0	7	35.00
South Australia	4	0	0	2	1	1	4	20.00

== Statistics ==
=== Most Runs ===
Neil Harvey 401

=== Most Wickets ===
Pat Crawford 25
