= Sheffield Shield =

Cricket competition in Australia

- Countries: Australia
- Administrator: Cricket Australia
- Format: First-class
- First edition: 1892–93
- Latest edition: 2025–26
- Tournament format: Double round-robin, then final
- Number of teams: 6
- Current champion: South Australia (15th title)
- Most successful: New South Wales (47 titles)
- Most runs: Darren Lehmann (13,635)
- Most wickets: Clarrie Grimmett (513)
- TV: Cricket Network; Kayo Sports; Fox Cricket (selected matches)
- Website: Cricket Australia
- 2026–27 Sheffield Shield season

The Sheffield Shield is the domestic first-class cricket competition of Australia. The tournament is contested between teams representing the six states of Australia. The Sheffield Shield is named after Lord Sheffield.

Prior to the Shield being established, a number of intercolonial matches were played. The Shield, donated by Lord Sheffield, was first contested during the 1892–93 season, between New South Wales, South Australia and Victoria. Queensland was admitted for the 1926–27 season, Western Australia for the 1947–48 season, and Tasmania for the 1977–78 season.

The competition is contested in a double-round-robin format, with each team playing every other team twice, i.e. home and away. Points are awarded based on wins, draws, ties and bonus points for runs and wickets in a team's first 100 batting and bowling overs, with the top two teams playing a final at the end of the season. Regular matches last for four days; the final lasts for five days.

The Sheffield Shield is supported by a Second XI reserves competition.

== History ==
=== Origin of the shield ===
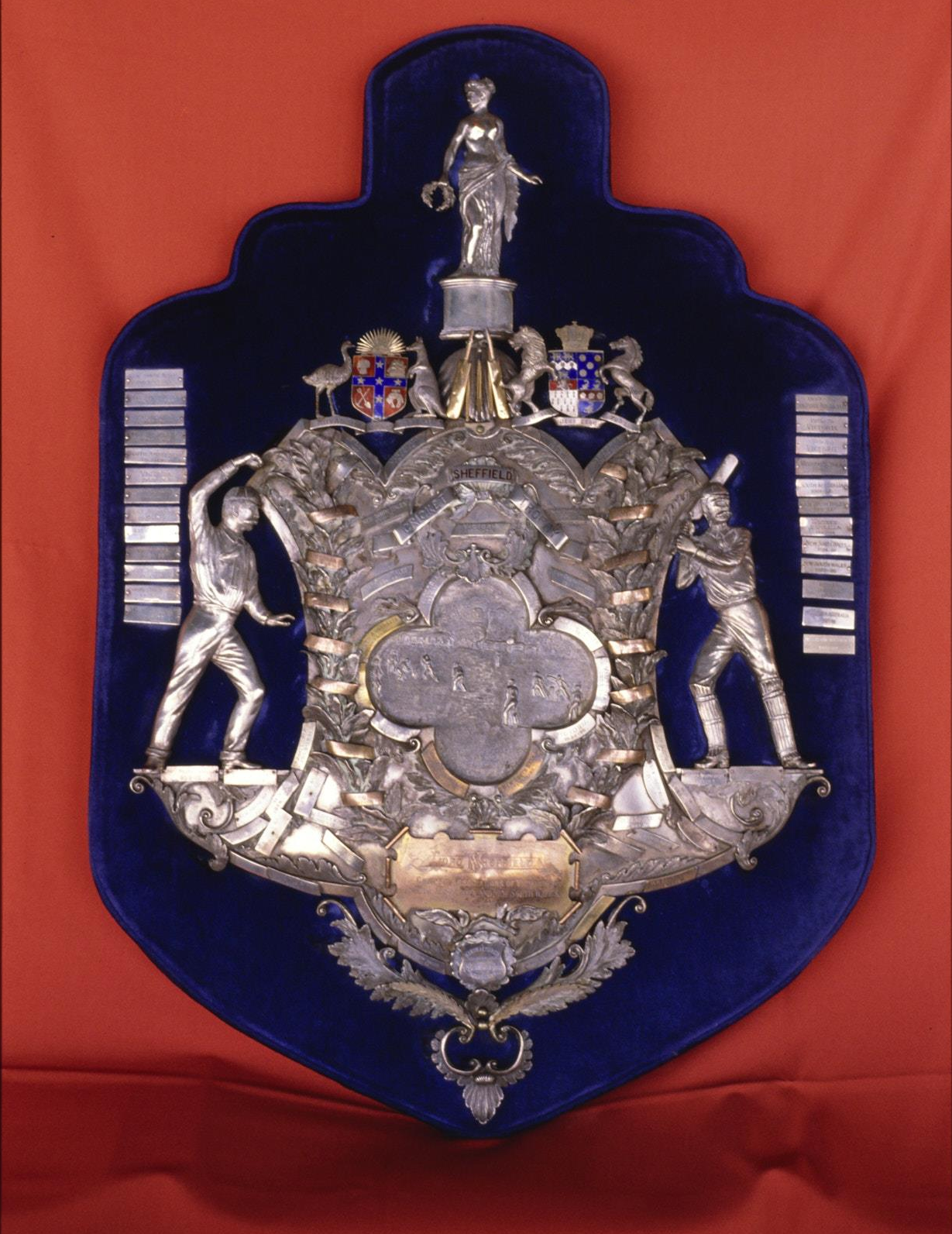
The Sheffield Shield as it appeared in 1989 with blue felt.

The Shield, which measures 46 in. by 30 in., is of silver, flanked with a batsman on one side and a bowler on the other, each solidly modelled with the bat and the bail of gold. On the contre plate is a representation of the Sheffield Park Cricket Ground, with a full team in their respective places in the field, each man and the pavilion being raised and standing out boldly. The main body of the Shield is of silver, of which 200 czs. were used; the leaf, shell, and scroll work, being in parts oxidised to heighten the general effect. There are 16 golden inscription plates, to bear the names of successful colonies. The Sheffield and Australian arms resting on the shoulders of the Shield are enamelled in correct colours, and the whole is surmounted by a statue of "Victory.”

— George Giffen, With Bat And Ball, 1898

In 1891–92 the Earl of Sheffield was in Australia as the promoter of the English team led by W. G. Grace. The tour included three Tests played in Melbourne, Sydney and Adelaide.

At the conclusion of the tour, Lord Sheffield donated £150 to the New South Wales Cricket Association to fund a trophy for an annual tournament of intercolonial cricket in Australia. The three colonies of New South Wales, Victoria and South Australia were already playing each other in ad hoc matches. The new tournament commenced in the summer of 1892–93, mandating home and away fixtures between each colony each season. The three teams competed for the Sheffield Shield, named after its benefactor. A Polish immigrant, Phillip Blashki of Melbourne, won the competition to design the trophy, a 36 in × 23 in (91 cm × 58 cm) silver shield.

The competition therefore commenced some 15 years after Australia's first Test match.

The Sheffield Shield was originally run on a challenge system. The first match was played in Adelaide beginning on 16 December 1892, with South Australia facing New South Wales. South Australia secured victory, making them the inaugural holders of the Shield.

Victoria then took possession after defeating South Australia on 4 January 1893. Later that month, on 30 January, the Australasian Cricket Council altered the format, deciding that the Shield would be awarded at the end of the season to the team with the best record. By the end of the season, Victoria had the strongest record and were confirmed as holders once more.

=== Sponsorship and name changes ===
In 1999, the Australian Cricket Board (now Cricket Australia) announced a sponsorship deal which included renaming the Sheffield Shield to the Pura Milk Cup, then to the Pura Cup the following season. Pura is a brand name of National Foods, a wholly owned subsidiary of Bega Cheese. The sponsorship increased total annual prize money to A$220,000, with the winners receiving A$75,000 and the runners up A$45,000.

The records of the "Pura Cup" era are considered a part of Sheffield Shield history, with the winning teams continuing to have their names engraved onto the original shield throughout the period.

On 16 July 2008 it was announced that Weet-Bix would take over sponsorship of the competition from the start of the 2008–09 season, and that the name would revert to the "Sheffield Shield" or the Sheffield Shield presented by Weet-Bix. Weet-Bix is a breakfast cereal manufactured by Sanitarium.

In the 2019–20 season, Marsh & McLennan Companies took over the sponsorship for the competition as the Marsh Sheffield Shield. This followed Marsh & McLennan's acquisition of JLT, which had sponsored the competition since 2017.

From the 2024-25 season, the Sheffield Shield has once again operated without a naming sponsor.

== Teams ==
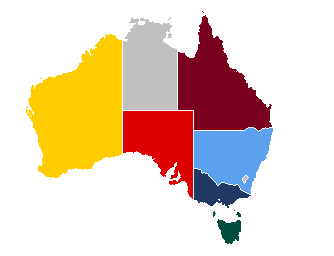

Since 1977–78, all six states of Australia have fielded their own teams. Details of each team are set out below.

Before 1993, all states were known solely by their state names or cricket association titles. Queensland was the first to adopt a nickname when it became known as the ‘Bulls’ from 1993; and following the success of that, other states adopted nicknames from 1995. The nicknames have since mostly fallen out of official use.

Team name	Team nickname	Home ground/s (Note: Each team has used several venues to host matches. For a full list, see list of cricket grounds in Australia.)	Inaugural season	First title	Last title	Shield titles	Team captain/s
New South Wales	Blues (1995–2022)	Cricket Central; Sydney Cricket Ground	1892–93	1895–96	2019–20	47	Jack Edwards
Queensland	Bulls (1993–pres)	Allan Border Field; Brisbane Cricket Ground	1926–27	1994–95	2020–21	9	Marnus Labuschagne
South Australia	Redbacks (1995–2024)	Adelaide Oval; Karen Rolton Oval	1892–93	1893–94	2025–26	15	Nathan McSweeney
Tasmania	Tigers (1995–pres)	Bellerive Oval	1977–78	2006–07	2012–13	3	Jordan Silk
Victoria	Bushrangers (1995–2018)	Junction Oval; Melbourne Cricket Ground	1892–93	1892–93	2018–19	32	Will Sutherland
Western Australia	Warriors (1995–2019)	Perth Stadium; WACA Ground	1947–48	1947–48	2023–24	18	Aaron Hardie

== Venues ==
Below are the venues that hosted Sheffield Shield matches during the 2025–26 season.

Adelaide Oval	Allan Border Field	Bellerive Oval	Cricket Central	The Gabba
Adelaide, South Australia	Brisbane, Queensland	Hobart, Tasmania	Sydney, New South Wales	Brisbane, Queensland
Capacity: 53,500	Capacity: 6,500	Capacity: 20,000	Capacity: 3,000	Capacity: 42,000
Junction Oval	Karen Rolton Oval	Melbourne Cricket Ground	Sydney Cricket Ground	WACA Ground
Melbourne, Victoria	Adelaide, South Australia	Melbourne, Victoria	Sydney, New South Wales	Perth, Western Australia
Capacity: 5,000	Capacity: 7,000	Capacity: 100,024	Capacity: 48,000	Capacity: 24,000

== Competition format ==
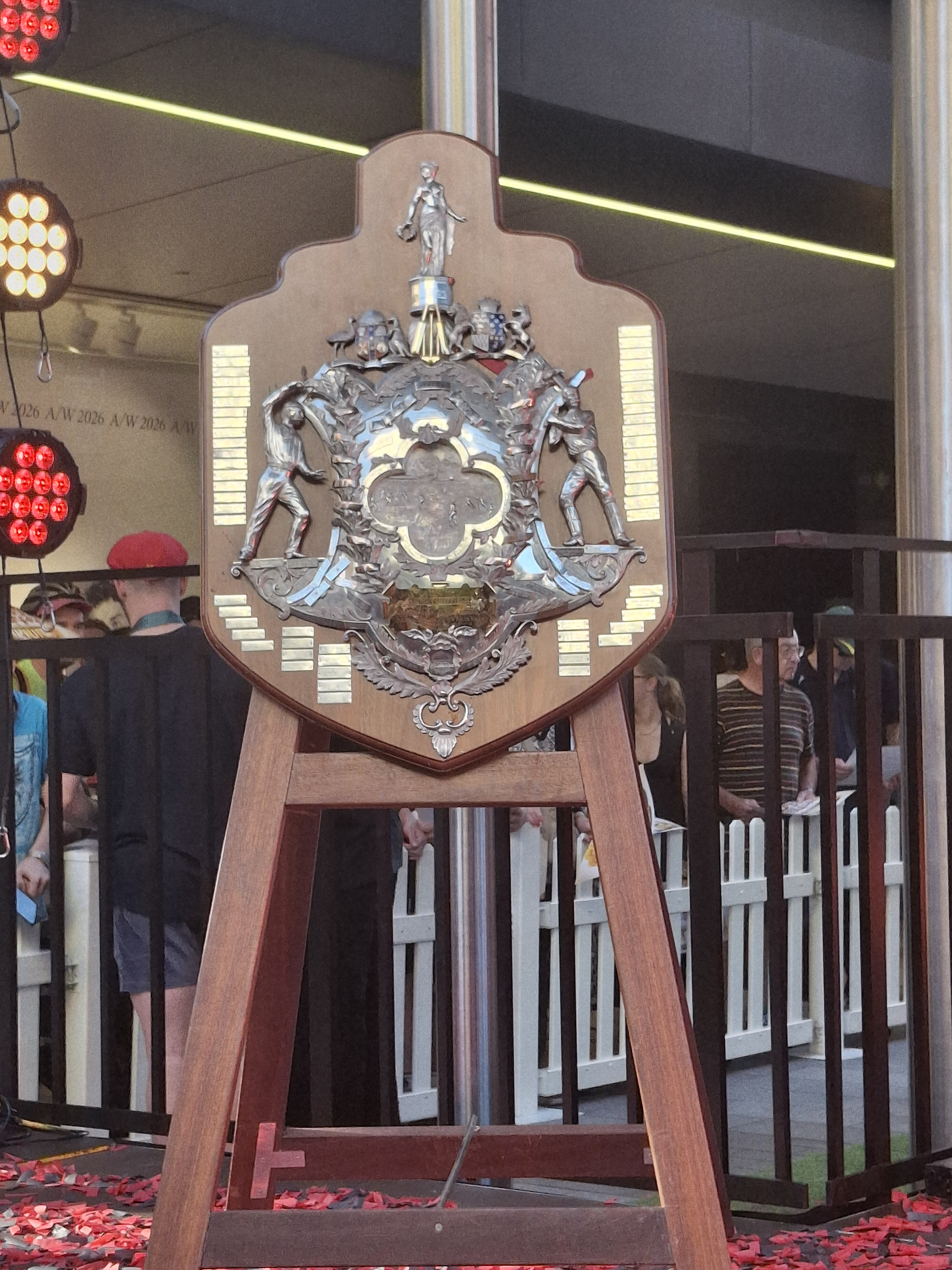
The Sheffield Shield on display in 2026.

=== Home and away season ===
In most years the competition has been contested in a double-round-robin format, with each team playing every other team twice, i.e., home and away.

Matches were timeless (i.e. played to an outright result, weather and schedule permitting) up to 1926–27. A four-day time limit has applied since 1927–28.

=== Final ===
Since 1982–83, the top two teams after the home and away rounds have met in a final, played over five days at the home ground of the top-ranked team. Between 1982–83 and 2017–18, in the event of a draw or tie, the Shield was awarded to the top-ranked team.

Since the 2018–19 summer, in the event of a draw or tie, the team which scores more first innings bonus points, based on the system used in regular season matches, wins the Shield.

=== Exceptions ===
Although the above has been the standard season structure, for a variety of reasons, including war, pandemic and scheduling difficulties, the following exceptions have occurred:

- South Australia had no home game with: Victoria in 1901–02 or 1903–04; either opponent in 1907–08; New South Wales in 1910–11.
- Queensland and South Australia played only once (in South Australia) in 1926–27.
- Western Australia played each team only once from their debut in 1946–47 until 1955–56 inclusive.
- Tasmania played each team only once from their debut in 1977–78 until 1981–82 inclusive.
- In 2019–20 the season was curtailed after nine rounds due to the COVID-19 pandemic. No final was played in this season.
- The 2020–21 season was heavily affected by COVID-19 lockdowns, with QLD playing 9 games, Tasmania and South Australia 8, and Western Australia, New South Wales and Victoria playing 7 each. Unusually for the Sheffield Shield, Victoria and New South Wales played each other 3 times during the home and away portion of the season.

Where the teams played an unequal number of games, their final points were calculated on a pro-rata basis.

In 1940–41, however, the Sheffield Shield was not contested but ten first-class "friendly" matches were played between the States for patriotic funds; however financially these were unsuccessful.

In the following season (1941–42), the Sheffield Shield again did not take place. Instead an "Interstate Patriotic Competition" was held, with all proceeds going to the war effort. Only one match was played (Queensland v NSW at the Gabba) before the competition was cancelled due to the Japanese attack on Pearl Harbor on December 7, 1941.

== Points system ==
The current points system has been used since the 2016–17 season. The points are awarded as follows:

Win: 6 points + bonus points
Tie: 3 points + bonus points
Abandoned or Draw: 1 point + bonus points
Loss: 0 points + bonus points

Bonus points may be earned during the initial 100 overs of each team's first innings, and are retained whatever the match outcome.

Result	Points (Note: Bonus points example – If after 100 overs the score is 8/350, the batting team would receive 1.5 points ([350 − 200] × 0.01), and the bowling side would receive 0.8 points (0.1 for each wicket))
Bonus batting points	0.01 for every run above 200 in the first 100 overs of each side’s first innings
Bonus bowling points	0.1 for each wicket taken in the first 100 overs of each side’s first innings

- The number of outright wins and then the Quotient (a team's batting average divided by its bowling average) is used to separate teams which finish on an equal number of points.
- Teams can be penalised points for failing to maintain an adequate over rate.

=== Previous systems ===
- The Shield was initially envisaged as a match-by-match challenge trophy; it was originally determined on 4 January 1893 that it would first be awarded to the winner of the next inter-colonial match (which was, in fact, the fourth of the season), and then would pass in perpetuity to any team which defeated the holder of the trophy; But on 30 January, it was decided instead to award the Shield to the team which won the most intercolonial matches across the season.
- The quotient has been used as a tie-breaker for teams on equal points since 1893–94.
- First innings points were introduced in 1932–33 and used until 1970–71.
- Bonus points for first innings batting and bowling were used from 1971–72 to 1980–81 inclusive. During the first 100 (eight-ball) overs of each side's first innings, a maximum of 10 batting bonus points could be attained. They were awarded for every 25 runs scored from 175 to 400 inclusive. A maximum of 5 bowling bonus points were available, initially upon capture of the second, fourth, sixth, eighth and last wickets. This was later changed to wickets 1, 3, 5, 7 and 9 as batting teams often declared when 9 wickets down to deny the bowling side the additional bonus point. Teams were awarded an extra 10 points for an outright win.
- From 1981–82 to 2013–14 there were no bonus points. Teams were awarded 6 points for an outright win, and 2 points for drawing or losing after holding a first innings lead.
- When the modern bonus points system was introduced for the 2014–15 season, the bowling team received 0.5 points for taking the 5th, 7th and 9th wickets (a maximum 1.5 points). The bonus bowling points were modified to their current values for the 2016–17 season.

== Competition placings ==
Prior to 1982–83, the team finishing atop the ladder after the home-and-away season was declared the champion. A five-day Final was introduced that season, with first place hosting second. Until 2018–19, the visiting side had to win outright to claim the title, while the host was awarded the championship if the match ended in a draw or tie. From 2018–19 onwards, drawn or tied Finals are decided by first-innings bonus points, using the same system as the regular season.

Further details including match scorecards are available at Cricinfo and the Cricket Archive.

=== 1892/93–1925/26 ===
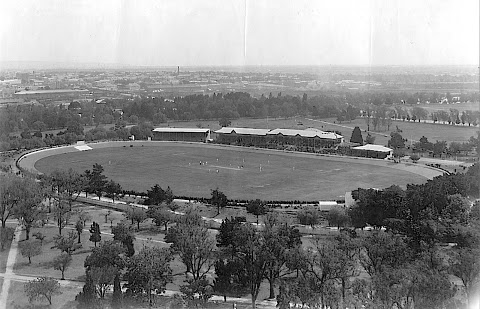
Adelaide Oval during a 1902 Sheffield Shield match between South Australia and New South Wales.

Season	Winner	Second	Third
1892–93	Victoria	New South Wales	South Australia
1893–94	South Australia	New South Wales	Victoria
1894–95	Victoria	South Australia	New South Wales
1895–96	New South Wales	Victoria	South Australia
1896–97	New South Wales	South Australia	Victoria
1897–98	Victoria	South Australia	New South Wales
1898–99	Victoria	New South Wales	South Australia
1899–1900	New South Wales	Victoria	South Australia
1900–01	Victoria	New South Wales	South Australia
1901–02	New South Wales	Victoria	South Australia
1902–03	New South Wales	Victoria	South Australia
1903–04	New South Wales	Victoria	South Australia
1904–05	New South Wales	Victoria	South Australia
1905–06	New South Wales	Victoria	South Australia
1906–07	New South Wales	South Australia	Victoria
1907–08	Victoria	South Australia	New South Wales
1908–09	New South Wales	South Australia	Victoria
1909–10	South Australia	New South Wales	Victoria
1910–11	New South Wales	South Australia	Victoria
1911–12	New South Wales	Victoria	South Australia
1912–13	South Australia	New South Wales	Victoria
1913–14	New South Wales	South Australia	Victoria
1914–15	Victoria	New South Wales	South Australia
1915–16	Not contested due to World War I		
1916–17	Not contested due to World War I		
1917–18	Not contested due to World War I		
1918–19	Not contested due to World War I		
1919–20	New South Wales	Victoria	South Australia
1920–21	New South Wales	Victoria	South Australia
1921–22	Victoria	New South Wales	South Australia
1922–23	New South Wales	Victoria	South Australia
1923–24	Victoria	New South Wales	South Australia
1924–25	Victoria	New South Wales	South Australia
1925–26	New South Wales	Victoria	South Australia

=== 1926/27–1946/47 ===
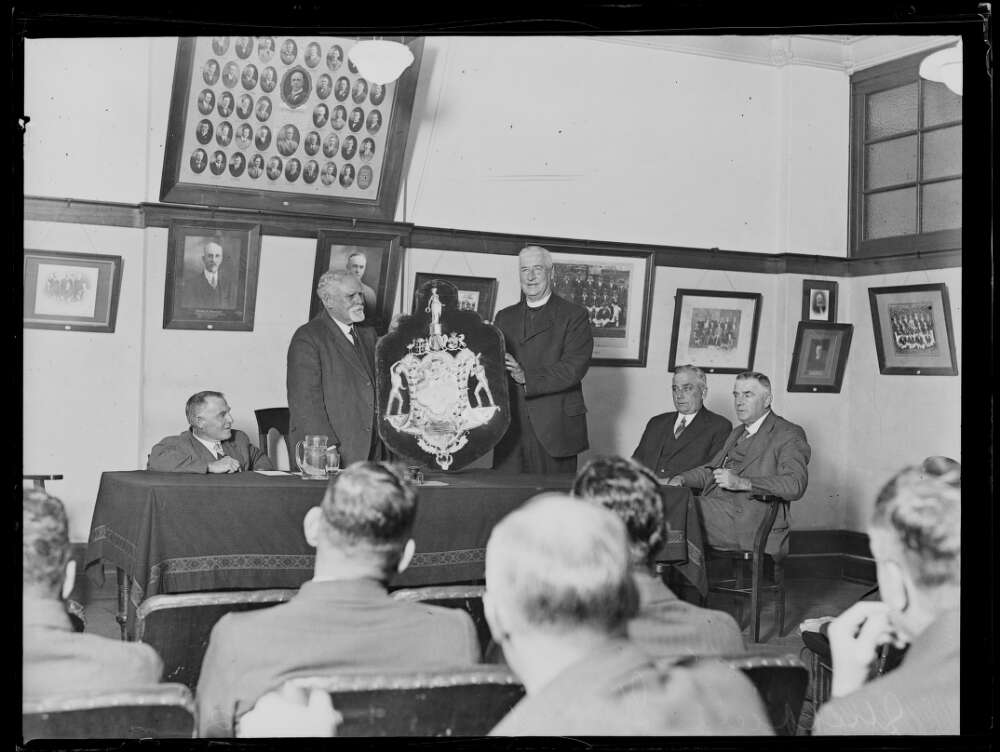
The Sheffield Shield being handed over to New South Wales, 4 May 1932.

Queensland joined in 1926–27

Season	Winner	Second	Third	Fourth
1926–27	South Australia	Victoria	New South Wales	Queensland
1927–28	Victoria	South Australia	New South Wales	Queensland
1928–29	New South Wales	Victoria	Queensland	South Australia
1929–30	Victoria	New South Wales	South Australia	Queensland
1930–31	Victoria	New South Wales	Queensland	South Australia
1931–32	New South Wales	South Australia	Victoria	Queensland
1932–33	New South Wales	Victoria	South Australia	Queensland
1933–34	Victoria	New South Wales	South Australia	Queensland
1934–35	Victoria	New South Wales	South Australia	Queensland
1935–36	South Australia	New South Wales	Victoria	Queensland
1936–37	Victoria	South Australia	New South Wales	Queensland
1937–38	New South Wales	South Australia	Victoria	Queensland
1938–39	South Australia	Victoria	Queensland	New South Wales
1939–40	New South Wales	South Australia	Victoria	Queensland
1940–41	Not contested due to World War II			
1941–42	Not contested due to World War II			
1942–43	Not contested due to World War II			
1943–44	Not contested due to World War II			
1944–45	Not contested due to World War II			
1945–46	Not contested due to World War II			
1946–47	Victoria	New South Wales	Queensland	South Australia

=== 1947/48–1976/77 ===
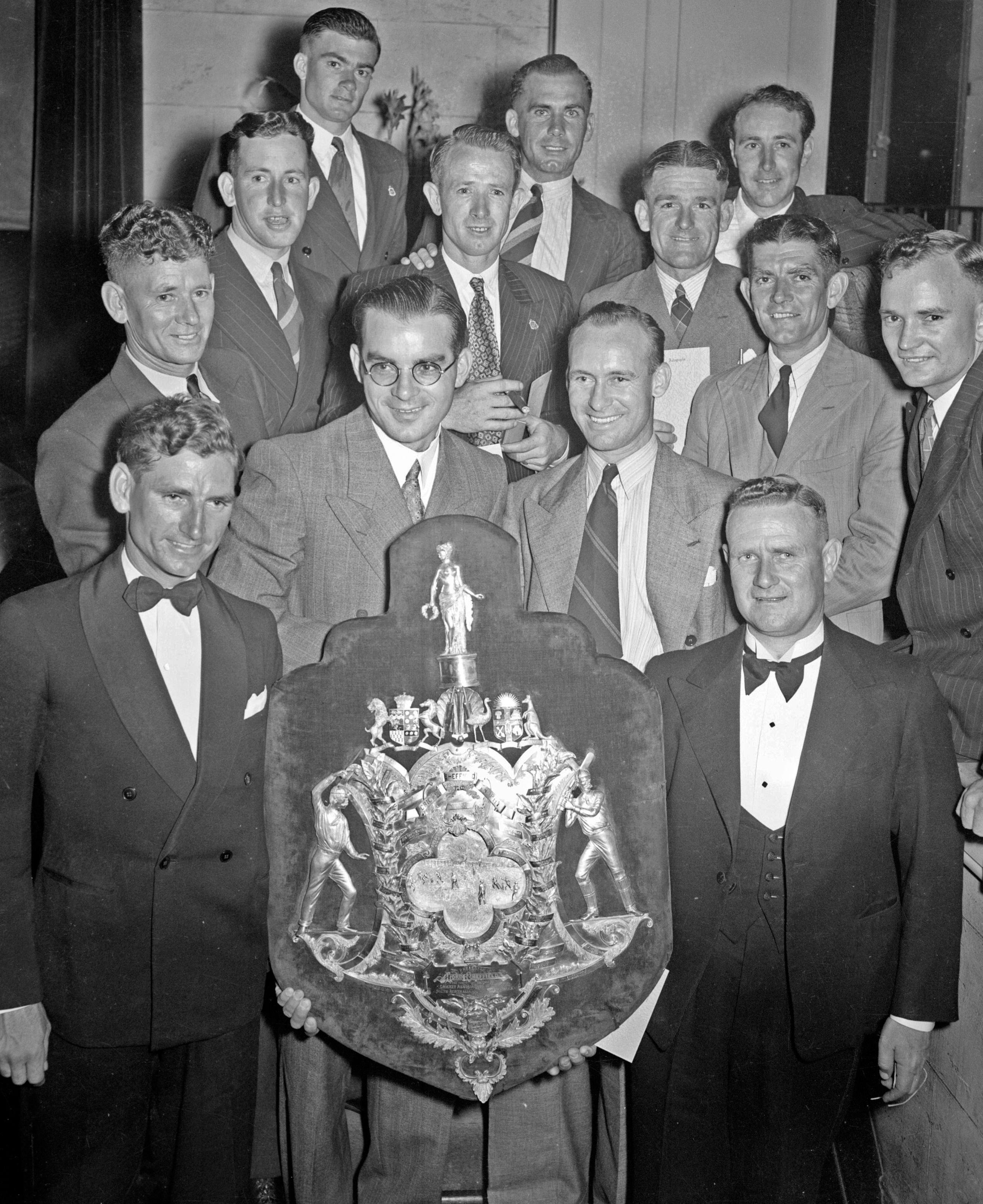
Western Australia team with the 1947–48 Sheffield Shield. The state won the shield despite playing three fewer games than other states with having the better average than their rivals.

Western Australia joined in 1947–48

Season	Winner	Second	Third	Fourth	Fifth
1947–48	Western Australia	New South Wales	South Australia	Queensland	Victoria
1948–49	New South Wales	Victoria	South Australia	Queensland	Western Australia
1949–50	New South Wales	Victoria	Western Australia	Queensland	South Australia
1950–51	Victoria	New South Wales	Western Australia	Queensland	South Australia
1951–52	New South Wales	Victoria	Queensland	South Australia	Western Australia
1952–53	South Australia	New South Wales	Victoria	Western Australia	Queensland
1953–54	New South Wales	Victoria	Queensland	South Australia	Western Australia
1954–55	New South Wales	Victoria	Western Australia	Queensland	South Australia
1955–56	New South Wales	Victoria	Queensland	Western Australia	South Australia
1956–57	New South Wales	Queensland	Victoria	Western Australia	South Australia
1957–58	New South Wales	Victoria	Queensland	Western Australia	South Australia
1958–59	New South Wales	Queensland	Victoria	Western Australia	South Australia
1959–60	New South Wales	Victoria	Western Australia	Queensland	South Australia
1960–61	New South Wales	Victoria	Western Australia	Queensland	South Australia
1961–62	New South Wales	Queensland	South Australia	Victoria	Western Australia
1962–63	Victoria	South Australia	New South Wales	Western Australia	Queensland
1963–64	South Australia	Victoria	New South Wales	Queensland	Western Australia
1964–65	New South Wales	Victoria	South Australia	Western Australia	Queensland
1965–66	New South Wales	Western Australia	South Australia	Victoria	Queensland
1966–67	Victoria	South Australia	New South Wales	Western Australia	Queensland
1967–68	Western Australia	Victoria	South Australia	New South Wales	Queensland
1968–69	South Australia	Western Australia	Queensland	Victoria	New South Wales
1969–70	Victoria	Western Australia	New South Wales	South Australia	Queensland
1970–71	South Australia	Victoria	Western Australia	New South Wales	Queensland
1971–72	Western Australia	South Australia	New South Wales	Victoria	Queensland
1972–73	Western Australia	South Australia	New South Wales	Victoria	Queensland
1973–74	Victoria	Queensland	New South Wales	Western Australia	South Australia
1974–75	Western Australia	Queensland	Victoria	New South Wales	South Australia
1975–76	South Australia	Queensland	Western Australia	New South Wales	Victoria
1976–77	Western Australia	Victoria	Queensland	New South Wales	South Australia

=== 1977/78–present ===
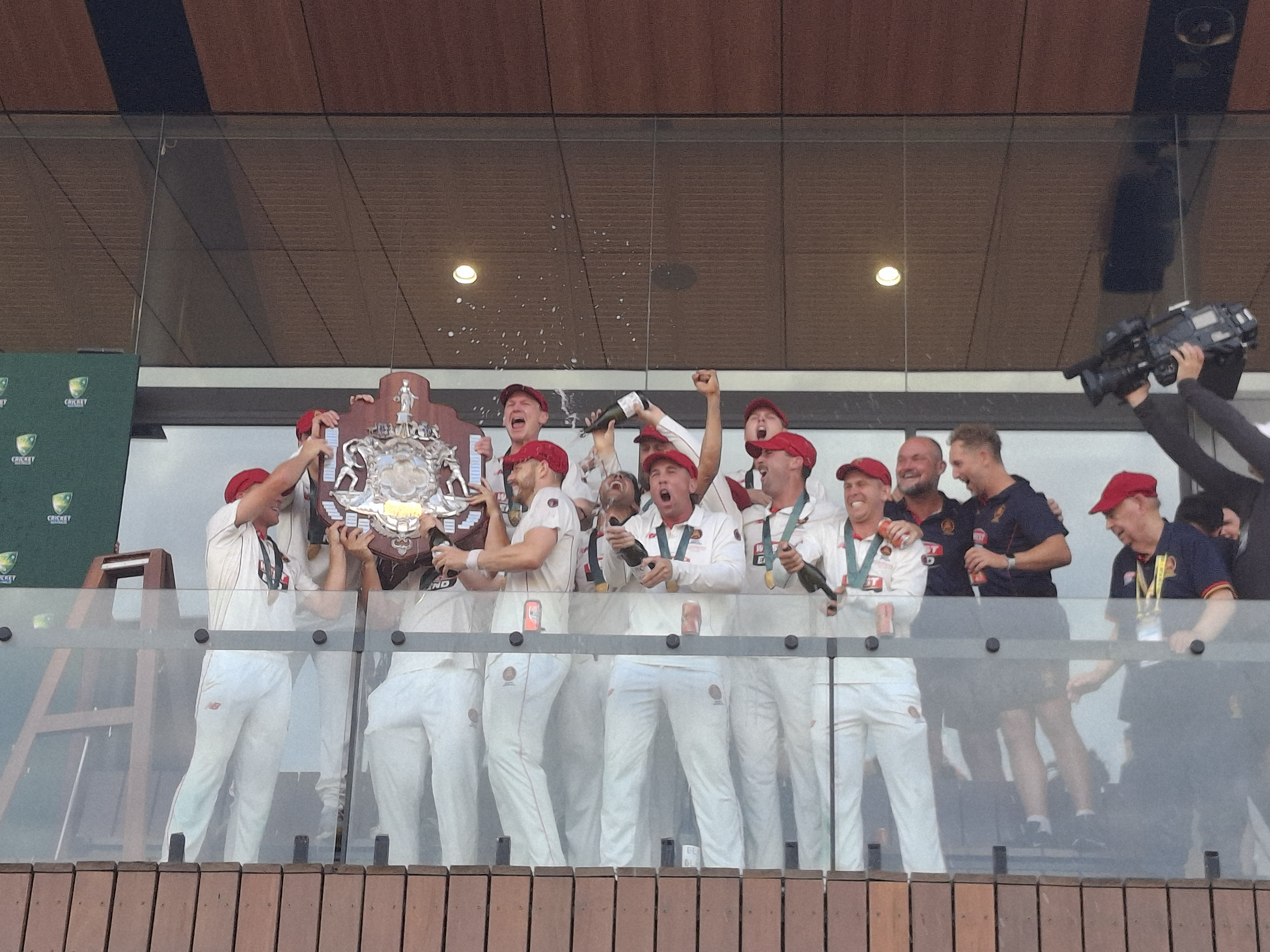
The South Australian team celebrate winning the Sheffield Shield in 2025, breaking their 29-year drought.

Tasmania joined in 1977–78

Season	Winner	Second	Third	Fourth	Fifth	Sixth
1977–78	Western Australia	Queensland	Victoria	South Australia	New South Wales	Tasmania
1978–79	Victoria	Western Australia	New South Wales	Queensland	South Australia	Tasmania
1979–80	Victoria	South Australia	New South Wales	Queensland	Western Australia	Tasmania
1980–81	Western Australia	New South Wales	Queensland	Victoria	Tasmania	South Australia
1981–82	South Australia	New South Wales	Western Australia	Tasmania	Queensland	Victoria
1982–83	New South Wales	Western Australia	South Australia	Tasmania	Queensland	Victoria
1983–84	Western Australia	Queensland	Tasmania	New South Wales	South Australia	Victoria
1984–85	New South Wales	Queensland	South Australia	Western Australia	Victoria	Tasmania
1985–86	New South Wales	Queensland	Victoria	Western Australia	South Australia	Tasmania
1986–87	Western Australia	Victoria	Queensland	South Australia	New South Wales	Tasmania
1987–88	Western Australia	Queensland	New South Wales	Victoria	South Australia	Tasmania
1988–89	Western Australia	South Australia	Queensland	New South Wales	Tasmania	Victoria
1989–90	New South Wales	Queensland	South Australia	Tasmania	Western Australia	Victoria
1990–91	Victoria	New South Wales	Queensland	Western Australia	South Australia	Tasmania
1991–92	Western Australia	New South Wales	Victoria	Queensland	South Australia	Tasmania
1992–93	New South Wales	Queensland	Western Australia	South Australia	Tasmania	Victoria
1993–94	New South Wales	Tasmania	Western Australia	Victoria	South Australia	Queensland
1994–95	Queensland	South Australia	Victoria	Western Australia	New South Wales	Tasmania
1995–96	South Australia	Western Australia	Queensland	Tasmania	New South Wales	Victoria
1996–97	Queensland	Western Australia	New South Wales	Tasmania	Victoria	South Australia
1997–98	Western Australia	Tasmania	Queensland	New South Wales	Victoria	South Australia
1998–99	Western Australia	Queensland	Victoria	South Australia	Tasmania	New South Wales
1999–2000	Queensland	Victoria	Western Australia	South Australia	Tasmania	New South Wales
2000–01	Queensland	Victoria	New South Wales	Tasmania	Western Australia	South Australia
2001–02	Queensland	Tasmania	Western Australia	South Australia	Victoria	New South Wales
2002–03	New South Wales	Queensland	Victoria	South Australia	Western Australia	Tasmania
2003–04	Victoria	Queensland	Tasmania	Western Australia	New South Wales	South Australia
2004–05	New South Wales	Queensland	Western Australia	Victoria	South Australia	Tasmania
2005–06	Queensland	Victoria	South Australia	Tasmania	Western Australia	New South Wales
2006–07	Tasmania	New South Wales	Victoria	Queensland	Western Australia	South Australia
2007–08	New South Wales	Victoria	Western Australia	Tasmania	South Australia	Queensland
2008–09	Victoria	Queensland	South Australia	Tasmania	Western Australia	New South Wales
2009–10	Victoria	Queensland	New South Wales	Western Australia	Tasmania	South Australia
2010–11	Tasmania	New South Wales	Queensland	Western Australia	Victoria	South Australia
2011–12	Queensland	Tasmania	Victoria	Western Australia	New South Wales	South Australia
2012–13	Tasmania	Queensland	New South Wales	Victoria	Western Australia	South Australia
2013–14	New South Wales	Western Australia	South Australia	Queensland	Tasmania	Victoria
2014–15	Victoria	Western Australia	New South Wales	Queensland	Tasmania	South Australia
2015–16	Victoria	South Australia	New South Wales	Queensland	Western Australia	Tasmania
2016–17	Victoria	South Australia	Western Australia	New South Wales	Queensland	Tasmania
2017–18	Queensland	Tasmania	Victoria	Western Australia	New South Wales	South Australia
2018–19	Victoria	New South Wales	Western Australia	Queensland	Tasmania	South Australia
2019–20	New South Wales	Victoria	Queensland	Tasmania	Western Australia	South Australia
2020–21	Queensland	New South Wales	Western Australia	Tasmania	Victoria	South Australia
2021–22	Western Australia	Victoria	Tasmania	New South Wales	Queensland	South Australia
2022–23	Western Australia	Victoria	Queensland	South Australia	Tasmania	New South Wales
2023–24	Western Australia	Tasmania	New South Wales	Victoria	South Australia	Queensland
2024–25	South Australia	Queensland	Victoria	New South Wales	Tasmania	Western Australia
2025–26	South Australia	Victoria	Queensland	Tasmania	New South Wales	Western Australia

== Player of the Year ==
The Player of the Year award is announced at the end of each season. Since its inception in 1976 it has been awarded to the best-performed player/s over the season, as determined a panel of judges. Victorian and South Australian batsman Matthew Elliott has won the award the most times, being awarded Player of the Year on three occasions.

Season	Winner(s)
1975–76	Ian Chappell (SA), Greg Chappell (Qld)
1976–77	Richie Robinson (Vic)
1977–78	David Ogilvie (Qld)
1978–79	Peter Sleep (SA)
1979–80	Ian Chappell (SA)
1980–81	Greg Chappell (Qld)
1981–82	Kepler Wessels (Qld)
1982–83	Kim Hughes (WA)
1983–84	Brian Davison (Tas), John Dyson (NSW)
1984–85	David Boon (Tas)
1985–86	Allan Border (Qld)
1986–87	Craig McDermott (Qld)
1987–88	Dirk Tazelaar (Qld), Mark Waugh (NSW)
1988–89	Tim May (SA)
1989–90	Mark Waugh (NSW)
1990–91	Stuart Law (Qld)
1991–92	Tony Dodemaide (Vic)
1992–93	Jamie Siddons (SA)
1993–94	Matthew Hayden (Qld)
1994–95	Dean Jones (Vic)
1995–96	Matthew Elliott (Vic)
1996–97	Andy Bichel (Qld)
1997–98	Dene Hills (Tas)
1998–99	Matthew Elliott (Vic)
1999–2000	Darren Lehmann (SA)
2000–01	Jamie Cox (Tas)
2001–02	Brad Hodge (Vic), Jimmy Maher (Qld)
2002–03	Clinton Perren (Qld)
2003–04	Matthew Elliott (Vic)
2004–05	Michael Bevan (Tas)
2005–06	Andy Bichel (Qld)
2006–07	Chris Rogers (WA)
2007–08	Simon Katich (NSW)
2008–09	Phillip Hughes (NSW)
2009–10	Chris Hartley (Qld)
2010–11	James Hopes (Qld)
2011–12	Jackson Bird (Tas)
2012–13	Ricky Ponting (Tas)
2013–14	Marcus North (WA)
2014–15	Adam Voges (WA)
2015–16	Travis Head (SA)
2016–17	Chadd Sayers (SA)
2017–18	Chris Tremain (Vic)
2018–19	Scott Boland (Vic)
2019–20	Moises Henriques (NSW), Nic Maddinson (Vic)
2020–21	Nathan Lyon (NSW)
2021–22	Henry Hunt (SA), Travis Dean (Vic)
2022–23	Michael Neser (Qld)
2023–24	Beau Webster (Tas)
2024–25	Fergus O'Neill (Vic)
2025-26	Liam Scott (SA)

== Records ==
=== Individual records ===
==== Most matches played ====
Rank	Matches	Player	Period
1	161	Jamie Cox (Tas)	1987–88 to 2005–06
2	159	John Inverarity (WA/SA)	1962–63 to 1984–85
3	147	Darren Lehmann (SA/Vic)	1987–88 to 2007–08
4	146	Jamie Siddons (SA/Vic)	1985 to 2000
5	142	Stuart Law (QLD)	1988 to 2004
Source: . Last updated: 26 March 2018.

==== Players representing three states ====
Player	Career	States	Matches
Graeme Watson	1964–65 to 1976–77	NSW, Vic, WA	60
Gary Cosier	1971–72 to 1980–81	Vic, SA, Qld	46
Trevor Chappell	1972–73 to 1984–85	NSW, SA, WA	63
Rod McCurdy	1980–81 to 1984–85	SA, Tas, Vic	33
Dirk Wellham	1980–81 to 1991–92	NSW, Qld, Tas	99
Colin Miller	1985–86 to 2001–02	Vic, SA, Tas	84
Michael Bevan	1989–90 to 2006–07	SA, NSW, Tas	118
Shane Watson	2000–01 to 2015–16	Tas, Qld, NSW	81
Shane Jurgensen	1999–2000 to 2006–07	WA, Tas, Qld	23
Aiden Blizzard	2007–08 to 2012–13	Vic, SA, Tas	21
Michael Klinger	1998–99 to 2018–19	Vic, SA, WA	122
Gurinder Sandhu	2012–13 to 2021–22	NSW, Tas, Qld	33
Source: A Century of Summers: 100 years of Sheffield Shield cricket, Geoff Armstrong, p. 278. Last updated: 30 Nov 2008.

Six other players have represented three Australian states in top-level cricket, but without playing Sheffield Shield games for all three – Neil Hawke (SA, Tas, WA); Walter McDonald (Qld, Tas, Vic); Percy McDonnell (NSW, Qld, Vic); Karl Quist (NSW, SA, WA); Greg Rowell (NSW, Qld, Tas); Wal Walmsley (NSW, Qld, Tas), Dan Christian (NSW, SA, Vic).

=== Team records ===
==== Team results ====
Rank	Team	Entered	Matches	Won	Lost	Drawn	Tied	% Won
1	New South Wales	1892–93	930	387	268	274	1	41.61
2	Victoria	1892–93	927	362	265	299	1	39.05
3	Western Australia	1947–48	696	247	216	233	0	35.49
4	Queensland	1926–27	817	258	283	275	1	31.58
5	South Australia	1892–93	917	256	415	245	1	27.92
6	Tasmania	1977–78	469	121	184	164	0	25.80
Source: . Last updated: 30 March 2026.

==== Highest team totals ====
Rank	Total	Team	Opponent	Venue	Season
1	1107	Victoria	New South Wales	Melbourne Cricket Ground, Melbourne	1926–27
2	918	New South Wales	South Australia	Sydney Cricket Ground, Sydney	1900–01
3	900/6d	Queensland	Victoria	Brisbane Cricket Ground, Brisbane	2005–06
4	821/7d	South Australia	Queensland	Adelaide Oval, Adelaide	1939–40
5	815	New South Wales	Victoria	Sydney Cricket Ground, Sydney	1908–09
Source: . Last updated: 31 March 2019.

==== Lowest team totals ====
Rank	Total	Team	Opponent	Venue	Season
1	27	South Australia	New South Wales	Sydney Cricket Ground, Sydney	1955–56
2	29	South Australia	New South Wales	Sydney Cricket Ground, Sydney	2004–05
3	31	Victoria	New South Wales	Melbourne Cricket Ground, Melbourne	1906–07
4	32	New South Wales	Tasmania	Bellerive Oval, Hobart	2020–21
5	35	Victoria	New South Wales	Sydney Cricket Ground, Sydney	1926–27
Source: . Last updated: 31 March 2019.

=== Batting records ===
==== Highest individual scores ====
Rank	Runs	Player	Match	Venue	Season
1	452*	Don Bradman (NSW)	New South Wales v Queensland	Sydney Cricket Ground, Sydney	1929–30
2	437	Bill Ponsford (Vic)	Victoria v Queensland	Melbourne Cricket Ground, Melbourne	1927–28
3	365*	Clem Hill (SA)	South Australia v New South Wales	Adelaide Oval, Adelaide	1900–01
4	359	Bob Simpson (NSW)	New South Wales v Queensland	Brisbane Cricket Ground, Brisbane	1963–64
5	357	Don Bradman (SA)	South Australia v Victoria	Melbourne Cricket Ground, Melbourne	1935–36
Source: . Last updated: 31 March 2019.

==== Most career runs ====
Rank	Runs	Player	Career
1	13,635 (266 inns.)	Darren Lehmann (SA/Vic)	1987–88 to 2007–08
2	10,821 (295 inns.)	Jamie Cox (Tas)	1987–88 to 2005–06
3	10,643 (259 inns.)	Jamie Siddons (Vic/SA)	1984–85 to 1999–2000
4	10,621 (211 inns.)	Michael Bevan (SA/NSW/Tas)	1989–90 to 2006–07
5	10,474 (254 inns.)	Brad Hodge (Vic)	1993–94 to 2009–10
Source: . Last updated: 25 March 2015.

==== Most runs in a season ====
Rank	Runs	Player	Average	Season
1	1,506 (17 inns.)	Simon Katich (NSW)	94.12	2007–08
2	1,464 (18 inns.)	Michael Bevan (Tas)	97.60	2004–05
3	1,381 (20 inns.)	Matthew Elliott (Vic)	81.23	2003–04
4	1,358 (20 inns.)	Adam Voges (WA)	104.46	2014–15
5	1,254 (18 inns.)	Graham Yallop (Vic)	69.66	1982–83
Source: . Last updated: 31 March 2019.

==== Highest batting averages ====
Rank	Average	Player	Career
1	110.19 (96 inns.)	Don Bradman (NSW/SA)	1927–28 to 1948–49
2	100.09 (12 inns.)	Barry Richards (SA)	1970–71
3	83.27 (70 inns.)	Bill Ponsford (Vic)	1920–21 to 1933–34
4	70.88 (95 inns.)	Alan Kippax (NSW)	1918–19 to 1935–36
5	68.00 (81 inns.)	Monty Noble (NSW)	1893–94 to 1919–20
6	67.03 (64 inns.)	Bill Woodfull (Vic)	1921–22 to 1933–34
Qualification: 10 innings. Source: . Last updated: 26 January 2020.

==== Most centuries ====
Rank	Centuries	Player	Matches
1	45	Darren Lehmann (SA/Vic)	147
2	42	Michael Bevan (SA/NSW/Tas)	118
3	36	Don Bradman (NSW/SA)	62
4	33	Chris Rogers (WA/Vic)	120
5	32	Matthew Elliott (Vic/SA)	122
Source: . Last updated: 25 March 2015.

=== Bowling records ===
==== Most career wickets ====
Rank	Wickets	Player	Matches	Average
1	513	Clarrie Grimmett (SOA/VIC)	79	25.29
2	441	Michael Kasprowicz (QLD)	101	24.56
3	430	Andy Bichel (QLD)	89	23.24
4	419	Jo Angel (WA)	105	24.86
5	397	Jackson Bird (NSW/TAS)	91	22.10
Source: . Last updated: 18 February 2025.

==== Most wickets in a season ====
Rank	Wickets	Player	Matches	Season
1	67	Colin Miller (Tas)	11	1997–98
2	65	Shaun Tait (SA)	10	2004–05
3	62	Chadd Sayers (SA)	11	2016–17
4	60	Chuck Fleetwood-Smith (Vic)	6	1934–35
5	60	Andy Bichel (Qld)	11	2004–05
6	60	Ben Hilfenhaus (Tas)	11	2006–07
Source: . Last updated: 31 March 2019.

==== Best career average ====
Rank	Average	Player	Overs	Wickets
1	17.10	Bill O'Reilly (NSW)	1,342.4	203
2	17.74	Joel Garner (SA)	403.1	55
3	17.87	Geff Noblet (SA)	1,394.4	190
4	18.09	Pat Crawford (NSW)	314.5	61
5	19.08	Charlie Turner (NSW)	653.2	73
Qualification: 200 overs bowled. Source: . Last updated: 31 March 2019.

==== Hat-tricks ====
Many bowlers have taken a hat-trick in the Sheffield Shield. Mitchell Starc is the only bowler to take two hat-tricks in a Sheffield Shield match. In round two of the 2017–18 competition, Starc became the only bowler to take a hat-trick in each innings of a first-class cricket match in Australia, doing so against Western Australia at Hurstville Oval.

=== Wicket-keeping records ===
==== Most dismissals ====
Rank	Dismissals	Player	Matches
1	546 (499 c. 47 st.)	Darren Berry (SA/Vic)	139
2	545 (530 c. 15 st.)	Chris Hartley (Qld)	128
3	488 (474 c. 14 st.)	Wade Seccombe (Qld)	101
4	350 (322 c. 28 st.)	Tim Zoehrer (WA)	107
5	343 (310 c. 33 st.)	Rod Marsh (WA)	86
Source: . Last updated: 26 January 2020.

==== Most dismissals in a season ====
Rank	Dismissals	Player	Season
1	59 (57 c. 2 st.)	Alex Carey (SA)	2016–17
2	58 (57 c. 1 st.)	Wade Seccombe (Qld)	2000–01
3	58 (56 c. 2 st.)	Chris Hartley (Qld)	2011–12
4	57 (57 c. 0 st.)	Matthew Wade (Vic)	2008–09
5	54 (52 c. 2 st.)	Wade Seccombe (Qld)	1995–96
6	54 (52 c. 2 st.)	Adam Gilchrist (WA)	1996–97
7	54 (52 c. 2 st.)	Darren Berry (Vic)	1999–2000
8	54 (50 c. 4 st.)	Adam Gilchrist (WA)	1995–96
9	54 (52 c. 2 st.)	Chris Hartley (Qld)	2008–09
10	54 (54 c. 0 st.)	Wade Seccombe (Qld)	1999–2000
Source: . Last updated: 26 January 2020.

== See also ==
- Intercolonial cricket in Australia
- One-Day Cup (Australia)
- Big Bash League
