= 1953–54 Sheffield Shield season =

Australian cricket tournament

- Cricket format: First-class
- Tournament format: Double round-robin
- Champions: New South Wales (26th title)
- Participants: 5
- Matches: 16
- Most runs: Colin McDonald (Victoria) – 733 runs
- Most wickets: Ian Johnson (Victoria) – 37 wickets

The 1953–54 Sheffield Shield season was the 52nd season of the Sheffield Shield, the domestic first-class cricket competition of Australia. The season was played between the 13 November 1953 to 2 March 1954 and was contested by five teams. After sixteen matches was played, New South Wales won their 26th title after finishing first by two points over Victoria. Colin McDonald from Victoria scored the most runs for the season with 733 runs while fellow Victorian player, Ian Johnson took the most wickets with 37.

== Points table ==
| Team | Pld | W | 1st Inn Won | 1st Inn Lost | L | Pts | Avg |
|---|---|---|---|---|---|---|---|
| New South Wales | 7 | 4 | 2 | 0 | 1 | 26 | 74.28 |
| Victoria | 7 | 4 | 1 | 1 | 1 | 24 | 68.57 |
| Queensland | 7 | 1 | 2 | 2 | 2 | 13 | 37.14 |
| South Australia | 7 | 1 | 0 | 3 | 3 | 8 | 22.85 |
| Western Australia | 4 | 0 | 1 | 0 | 3 | 3 | 15.00 |

== Statistics ==
=== Most Runs ===
Colin McDonald 733

=== Most Wickets ===
Ian Johnson 37
