= Walter McDonald =

Walter McDonald may refer to:

- Walter McDonald (cricketer) (1884–1955), Australian cricketer
- Walter McDonald (politician) (1903–1999), Canadian politician in Manitoba
- Walter McDonald (priest) (1830–1899), Irish-born Roman Catholic priest in New Zealand
- Walter McDonald (professor) (1854–1920), Irish Roman Catholic priest, theologian and professor
- William Walter McDonald (1844–1929), Canadian politician from the Northwest Territories
- Walt McDonald (born 1934), Poet Laureate of Texas
- Walt McDonald (American football) (1920–2012), American football defensive back
