= 1950–51 Sheffield Shield season =

Australian cricket tournament

- Cricket format: First-class
- Tournament format: Double round-robin
- Champions: Victoria (18th title)
- Participants: 5
- Matches: 16
- Most runs: Lindsay Hassett (Victoria) (770)
- Most wickets: Colin McCool (Queensland) (46)

The 1950–51 Sheffield Shield season was the 49th season of the Sheffield Shield, the domestic first-class cricket competition of Australia. Victoria won the championship.

== Table ==
Team	Played	Won	1st Inns Won	1st Inns Lost	Lost	Points	Average
Victoria	7	5	1	1	0	29	82.85
New South Wales	7	4	2	1	0	27	77.14
Western Australia	4	1	1	0	2	8	40.00
Queensland	7	1	1	0	5	8	22.85
South Australia	7	0	0	3	4	3	8.57

== Statistics ==
=== Most Runs ===
Lindsay Hassett 770

=== Most Wickets ===
Colin McCool 46
