= 1935–36 Sheffield Shield season =

Australian cricket tournament

- Cricket format: First-class
- Tournament format: Double round-robin
- Champions: South Australia (5th title)
- Participants: 4
- Matches: 12
- Most runs: Don Bradman (South Australia) (739)
- Most wickets: Frank Ward (New South Wales) (33)

The 1935–36 Sheffield Shield season was the 40th season of the Sheffield Shield, the domestic first-class cricket competition of Australia. South Australia won the championship.

== Table ==
Team	Played	Won	1st Inns Won	1st Inns Lost	Lost	Drawn	Points
South Australia	6	4	1	0	0	1	25
New South Wales	6	2	0	1	2	1	13
Victoria	6	1	2	1	2	0	12
Queensland	6	0	1	2	3	0	5

== Statistics ==
=== Most Runs ===
Don Bradman 739

=== Most Wickets ===
Frank Ward 33
