= 1989–90 Sheffield Shield season =

Australian cricket tournament

- Cricket format: First-class
- Tournament format(s): Double round-robin & Final
- Champions: New South Wales (40th title)
- Participants: 6
- Matches: 31
- Player of the series: Mark Waugh (New South Wales)
- Most runs: Mark Waugh (New South Wales) (967)
- Most wickets: Craig McDermott (Queensland) (54)

The 1989–90 Sheffield Shield season was the 88th season of the Sheffield Shield, the domestic first-class cricket competition of Australia. New South Wales won the championship.

== Table ==
Team	Played	Won	Lost	Tied	Drawn	N/R	Points
New South Wales	10	3	3	0	4	0	26
Queensland	10	2	2	0	6	0	26
South Australia	10	3	3	0	4	0	20
Tasmania	10	2	3	0	5	0	16
Western Australia	10	2	2	0	6	0	14
Victoria	10	1	0	0	9	0	13.6

== Final ==
(H) New South Wales	v	Queensland
360; Mark Taylor 127		103; Greg Matthews 5/31; Adrian Tucker 3/17
396/6 dec Mark Taylor 100; Mark Waugh 78*no		308

New South Wales won by 345 runs.
Venue: Sydney

== Statistics ==
=== Most Runs ===
Mark Waugh 967

=== Most Wickets ===
Craig McDermott 54
