= 2004–05 Sheffield Shield season =

Australian cricket tournament

- Cricket format: First-class
- Tournament format(s): Double round-robin & Final
- Champions: New South Wales (44th title)
- Participants: 6
- Matches: 31
- Player of the series: Michael Bevan (Tasmania)
- Most runs: Michael Bevan (Tasmania) (1,464)
- Most wickets: Shaun Tait (South Australia) (65)

The 2004–05 Sheffield Shield season known as the Pura Cup was the 103rd season of the Sheffield Shield, the domestic first-class cricket competition of Australia. New South Wales won the championship.

== Table ==
Team	Played	Won	Lost	Tied	Drawn	N/R	Points
Queensland	10	6	1	0	3	0	42
New South Wales	10	6	2	0	2	0	40
Western Australia	10	6	2	0	2	0	36
Victoria	10	4	6	0	0	0	24
South Australia	10	3	7	0	0	0	18
Tasmania	10	1	8	0	1	0	10

== Final ==
18–20 March 2005
Scorecard

(H) Queensland	v	New South Wales
102 (35.2 overs); Andrew Symonds 36 (65); Nathan Bracken 6/27 (13.2 overs)		188 (53.2 overs); Brad Haddin 68* (92); Ashley Noffke 4/58 (13.2 overs)
268 (95 overs); Martin Love 116 (269); Matthew Nicholson 5/60 (23 overs)		9/183 (57.2 overs); Brad Haddin 41 (40); Joe Dawes 3/30 (10.2 overs)

New South Wales won by 1 wicket
The Gabba, Brisbane
Umpires: Peter Parker and Steve Davis
Player of the match: Nathan Bracken (New South Wales)

- New South Wales won the toss and elected to field.

== Statistics ==
=== Most runs ===
Player	Team	Mat	Inns	NO	Runs	Ave	HS	100	50
Michael Bevan	Tasmania	9	18	3	1464	97.6	190	8	2
Phil Jacques	New South Wales	11	19	1	1191	66.16	240*	3	5
Dominic Thornely	New South Wales	11	19	3	1006	62.87	261*	4	4
Brad Haddin	New South Wales	11	18	3	902	60.13	154	2	5
Brad Hodge	Victoria	8	15	1	891	63.64	204*	3	4

=== Most wickets ===
Player	Team	Mat	Inns	Overs	Wkts	Ave	Econ	BBI	BBM	5	10
Shaun Tait	South Australia	10	18	391.1	65	20.16	3.35	7/99	9/73	3	0
Andy Bichel	Queensland	11	22	417.2	60	22.1	3.17	7/77	10/127	4	1
Stuart MacGill	New South Wales	11	19	421.2	54	24.66	3.16	6/85	8/144	3	0
Joe Dawes	Queensland	11	22	347.5	46	21.93	2.90	6/49	8/88	3	0
Adam Griffith	Tasmania	9	18	365.2	45	28.77	3.54	7/54	10/173	4	1
