= 1996–97 Sheffield Shield season =

Australian cricket tournament

- Cricket format: First-class
- Tournament format(s): Double round-robin & Final
- Champions: Queensland (2nd title)
- Participants: 6
- Matches: 31
- Player of the series: Andy Bichel (Queensland)
- Most runs: Jamie Cox (Tasmania) (1,149)
- Most wickets: Michael Kasprowicz (Queensland) (48)

The 1996–97 Sheffield Shield season was the 95th season of the Sheffield Shield, the domestic first-class cricket competition of Australia. Queensland won the championship.

== Table ==
Team	Played	Won	Lost	Tied	Drawn	N/R	Points
Western Australia	10	6	1	0	3	0	42
Queensland	10	4	1	0	5	0	28
New South Wales	10	4	4	0	2	0	28
Tasmania	10	3	4	0	3	0	28
Victoria	10	3	5	0	2	0	19.7+
South Australia	10	2	7	0	1	0	14

+0.3 Pts deducted for slow over rate

== Final ==
March 21–25, 1997
Scorecard

Queensland	v	Western Australia (H)
320 (111 overs); Matthew Mott 86 (240); Tom Moody 4/75 (27 overs)		165 (68.1 overs); Murray Goodwin 63 (169); Adam Dale 6/38 (22 overs)
309 (103.4 overs); Trevor Barsby 111 (215); Tom Moody 4/76 (23.4 overs)		304 (122.3 overs); Tom Moody 152 (334); Michael Kasprowicz 5/83 (41.3 overs)

Queensland won by 160 runs
Venue: WACA, Perth
Umpires: Darrel Hair, Peter Parker, Terry Prue (TV)

- Queensland won the toss and elected to bat.

== Statistics ==
=== Most runs ===
Player	Team	Mat	Inns	NO	Runs	Ave	HS	100	50
Jamie Cox	Tasmania	10	20	1	1149	60.47	143	4	7
Darren Lehmann	South Australia	9	17	0	934	54.94	255	2	3
Michael Hussey	Western Australia	11	20	2	887	49.27	147	2	5
Ricky Ponting	Tasmania	7	13	2	815	74.09	159	3	3
Michael Di Venuto	Tasmania	10	19	0	778	40.94	130	2	5

=== Most wickets ===
Player	Team	Mat	Inns	Overs	Wkts	Ave	Econ	BBI	BBM	5	10
Michael Kasprowicz	Queensland	9	18	418.4	48	22.91	2.62	5/64	9/119	3	0
Adam Dale	Queensland	10	19	454.5	42	22.07	2.03	6/38	9/84	2	0
Tom Moody	Western Australia	9	17	357.4	38	24.36	2.58	7/41	9/95	1	0
Brendan Julian	Western Australia	8	15	300.0	35	24.28	2.83	7/48	10/86	2	1
Brad McNamara	New South Wales	8	15	235.2	33	22.45	3.14	5/19	8/61	3	0
