= 1960–61 Sheffield Shield season =

Australian cricket tournament

- Cricket format: First-class
- Tournament format: Double round-robin
- Champions: New South Wales (33rd title)
- Participants: 5
- Matches: 20
- Most runs: Bill Lawry (Victoria) (813)
- Most wickets: Des Hoare (Western Australia) (30)

The 1960–61 Sheffield Shield season was the 59th season of the Sheffield Shield, the domestic first-class cricket competition of Australia. New South Wales won the championship for the eighth consecutive year.

== Table ==
Team	Played	Won	1st Inns Won	Drawn	1st Inns Lost	Lost	Points
New South Wales	8	4	2	0	1	1	44
Victoria	8	4	1	0	2	1	40
Western Australia	8	2	0	0	2	4	32
Queensland	8	2	2	0	2	2	24
South Australia	8	1	2	0	0	5	18

== Statistics ==
=== Most Runs ===
Bill Lawry 813

=== Most Wickets ===
Des Hoare 30
