= 1986–87 Sheffield Shield season =

Australian cricket tournament

- Cricket format: First-class
- Tournament format(s): Double round-robin & Final
- Champions: Western Australia (10th title)
- Participants: 6
- Matches: 31
- Player of the series: Craig McDermott (Queensland)
- Most runs: Mike Veletta (Western Australia) (959)
- Most wickets: Chris Matthews (Western Australia) (47)

The 1986–87 Sheffield Shield season was the 85th season of the Sheffield Shield, the domestic first-class cricket competition of Australia. Western Australia won the championship.

== Table ==
Team	Played	Won	Lost	Tied	Drawn	N/R	Points
Western Australia	10	6	0	0	4	0	40
Victoria	10	3	3	0	4	0	20
Queensland	10	2	1	0	7	0	18
South Australia	10	2	3	0	5	0	18
New South Wales	10	2	3	0	5	0	16
Tasmania	10	0	5	0	5	0	4

== Final ==
Victoria	v	Western Australia (H)
404-8 dec Tony Dodemaide 81*no		654; Mike Veletta 262; Tom Moody 97
215-6; Simon O'Donnell 78

Match Drawn, Western Australia win by virtue of topping regular season ladder.
Venue: Perth

== Statistics ==
=== Most Runs ===
Mike Veletta 959

=== Most Wickets ===
Chris Matthews 47
