= 1956–57 Sheffield Shield season =

Australian cricket tournament

- Cricket format: First-class
- Tournament format: Double round-robin
- Champions: New South Wales (29th title)
- Participants: 5
- Matches: 20
- Most runs: Ken Meuleman (Western Australia) (779)
- Most wickets: Lindsay Kline (Victoria) (37)

The 1956–57 Sheffield Shield season was the 55th season of the Sheffield Shield, the domestic first-class cricket competition of Australia. New South Wales won the championship for the fourth consecutive year. All five teams played each other home and away for the first time.

The Queensland team delivered their best result to date and came to close to winning the Sheffield Shield for the first time in its history.

== Table ==
Team	Played	Won	1st Inns Won	Tied	1st Inns Lost	Lost	Points
New South Wales	8	3	2	1	2	0	25
Queensland	8	2	4	0	2	0	24
Victoria	8	3	1	1	1	2	21
Western Australia	8	1	1	0	3	3	11
South Australia	8	0	2	0	2	4	8

== Statistics ==
=== Most Runs ===
Ken Meuleman 779

=== Most Wickets ===
Lindsay Kline 37
