= 1958–59 Sheffield Shield season =

Australian cricket tournament

- Cricket format: First-class
- Tournament format: Double round-robin
- Champions: New South Wales (31st title)
- Participants: 5
- Matches: 20
- Most runs: Gavin Stevens (South Australia) (859)
- Most wickets: Richie Benaud (New South Wales) (39)

The 1958–59 Sheffield Shield season was the 57th season of the Sheffield Shield, the domestic first-class cricket competition of Australia. New South Wales won the championship for the sixth consecutive year.

== Table ==
Team	Played	Won	1st Inns Won	1st Inns Lost	Drawn	Lost	Points
New South Wales	8	4	3	1	0	0	52
Queensland	8	2	2	3	1	0	30
Victoria	8	1	2	1	1	3	20
Western Australia	8	1	2	2	0	3	18
South Australia	8	1	1	3	0	3	14

== Statistics ==
=== Most Runs ===
Gavin Stevens 859

=== Most Wickets ===
Richie Benaud 39
