= 1965–66 Sheffield Shield season =

Australian cricket tournament

- Cricket format: First-class
- Tournament format: Double round-robin
- Champions: New South Wales (36th title)
- Participants: 5
- Matches: 20
- Most runs: Grahame Thomas (New South Wales) (837)
- Most wickets: Tony Lock (Western Australia) (41)

The 1965–66 Sheffield Shield season was the 64th season of the Sheffield Shield, the domestic first-class cricket competition of Australia. New South Wales, the defending champions, won the championship again, for the 11th time in 13 seasons.

== Table ==
Team	Played	Won	1st Inns Won	Drawn	1st Inns Lost	Lost	Points
New South Wales	8	4	0	0	1	3	40
Western Australia	8	2	4	0	2	0	36
South Australia	8	2	1	0	3	2	28
Victoria	8	2	3	0	2	1	24
Queensland	8	1	1	0	1	5	18

== Statistics ==
=== Most Runs ===
Grahame Thomas 837

=== Most Wickets ===
Tony Lock 41
