= 1952–53 Sheffield Shield season =

Australian cricket tournament

- Cricket format: First-class
- Tournament format: Double round-robin
- Champions: South Australia (7th title)
- Participants: 5
- Matches: 16
- Most runs: Ken Mackay (Queensland) (443)
- Most wickets: Geff Noblet (South Australia) (41)

The 1952–53 Sheffield Shield season was the 51st season of the Sheffield Shield, the domestic first-class cricket competition of Australia. South Australia won the championship.

== Table ==
Team	Played	Won	1st Inns Won	1st Inns Lost	Lost	Points	Average
South Australia	7	4	3	0	0	29	82.85
New South Wales	7	2	2	2	1	18	51.42
Victoria	7	3	0	2	2	17	48.57
Western Australia	4	1	1	0	2	8	40.00
Queensland	7	0	0	2	5	2	5.71

== Statistics ==
=== Most Runs ===
Ken Mackay 443

=== Most Wickets ===
Geff Noblet 41
