= 1939–40 Sheffield Shield season =

Australian cricket tournament

- Cricket format: First-class
- Tournament format: Double round-robin
- Champions: New South Wales (22nd title)
- Participants: 4
- Matches: 12
- Most runs: Don Bradman (South Australia) (1062)
- Most wickets: Bill O'Reilly (New South Wales) (52)

The 1939–40 Sheffield Shield season was the 44th season of the Sheffield Shield, the domestic first-class cricket competition of Australia. New South Wales won the championship.

During the match between Queensland and Victoria, in January 1940, Victorian openers Ian Lee and Ben Barnett became the first ones to achieve partnerships of 150 or more, in both innings of a Shield match, when they put on 152 (Lee 90, Barnett 92) and 169 (Lee 93, Barnett 104*).

== Table ==
Team	Played	Won	1st Inns Won	1st Inns Lost	Lost	Drawn	Points
New South Wales	6	4	0	0	2	0	20
South Australia	6	3	1	0	2	0	18
Victoria	6	3	1	1	2	0	16
Queensland	6	1	0	0	5	0	5

== Statistics ==
=== Most Runs ===
Don Bradman: 1062

=== Most Wickets ===
Bill O'Reilly: 52
