= 1982–83 Sheffield Shield season =

Australian cricket tournament

- Cricket format: First-class
- Tournament format(s): Double round-robin & Final
- Champions: New South Wales (37th title)
- Participants: 6
- Matches: 31
- Player of the series: Kim Hughes (Western Australia)
- Most runs: Graham Yallop (Victoria) (1254)
- Most wickets: Joel Garner (South Australia) (55)

The 1982–83 Sheffield Shield season was the 81st season of the Sheffield Shield, the domestic first-class cricket competition of Australia. Western Australia topped the regular league ladder but New South Wales won the title. This was the first time that the championship was decided by virtue of a final held between the two leading sides in the league ladder.

== Points table ==
Team	Pld	W	WLF	L	LWF	DWF	DLF	ND	Pts
Western Australia	10	3	0	0	1	3	3	0	64
New South Wales	10	2	1	2	0	4	1	0	60
South Australia	10	3	0	1	0	3	3	0	60
Tasmania	10	1	0	1	0	4	4	0	32
Queensland	10	1	0	4	0	3	2	0	28
Victoria	10	0	0	2	0	2	6	0	8

== Final ==
New South Wales	v	Western Australia (H)
271; Rick McCosker 71; Bruce Yardley 4/92		259; Mike Whitney 4/69
280		238; Geoff Lawson 5/52; Trevor Chappell 4/45

New South Wales win by 54 runs.
Venue: Perth

== Statistics ==
=== Most Runs ===
Graham Yallop 1254

=== Most Wickets ===
Joel Garner 55
