= 1961–62 Sheffield Shield season =

Australian cricket tournament

- Cricket format: First-class
- Tournament format: Double round-robin
- Champions: New South Wales (34th title)
- Participants: 5
- Matches: 20
- Most runs: Bill Lawry (Victoria) (790)
- Most wickets: Wes Hall (Queensland) (43)

The 1961–62 Sheffield Shield season was the 60th season of the Sheffield Shield, the domestic first-class cricket competition of Australia. New South Wales won the championship for the ninth consecutive year.

== Table ==
Team	Played	Won	1st Inns Won	Drawn	1st Inns Lost	Lost	Points
New South Wales	8	6	1	0	0	1	64
Queensland	8	3	2	1	0	2	36
South Australia	8	3	0	0	0	5	30
Victoria	8	2	0	0	1	5	24
Western Australia	8	2	0	1	2	3	22

== Statistics ==
=== Most Runs ===
Bill Lawry 790

=== Most Wickets ===
Wes Hall 43
