= 1949–50 Sheffield Shield season =

Australian cricket tournament

- Cricket format: First-class
- Tournament format: Double round-robin
- Champions: New South Wales (24th title)
- Participants: 5
- Matches: 16
- Most runs: Bob McLean (South Australia) (660)
- Most wickets: Jack Iverson (Victoria) (46)

The 1949–50 Sheffield Shield season was the 48th season of the Sheffield Shield, the domestic first-class cricket competition of Australia. New South Wales won the championship.

== Table ==
| Team | Played | Won | 1st Inns Won | 1st Inns Lost | Lost | Points | Average |
|---|---|---|---|---|---|---|---|
| New South Wales | 7 | 5 | 1 | 0 | 1 | 28 | 80.00 |
| Victoria | 7 | 3 | 2 | 0 | 2 | 21 | 60.00 |
| Western Australia | 4 | 2 | 0 | 0 | 2 | 10 | 50.00 |
| Queensland | 7 | 2 | 0 | 2 | 3 | 12 | 34.00 |
| South Australia | 7 | 0 | 1 | 2 | 4 | 5 | 14.00 |

== Statistics ==
=== Most Runs ===
Allan McLean 660

=== Most Wickets ===
Jack Iverson 46
