= 1988–89 Sheffield Shield season =

Australian cricket tournament

- Cricket format: First-class
- Tournament format(s): Double round-robin & Final
- Champions: Western Australia (12th title)
- Participants: 6
- Matches: 31
- Player of the series: Tim May (South Australia)
- Most runs: Tom Moody (Western Australia) (1038)
- Most wickets: Tim May (South Australia) (43)

The 1988–89 Sheffield Shield season was the 87th season of the Sheffield Shield, the domestic first-class cricket competition of Australia. Western Australia won the championship, their third in a row.

== Table ==
Team	Played	Won	Lost	Tied	Drawn	N/R	Points
Western Australia	10	3	3	0	4	0	24
South Australia	10	2	2	0	6	0	20
Queensland	10	2	1	0	7	0	20
New South Wales	10	2	2	0	6	0	18
Tasmania	10	2	0	0	8	0	16
Victoria	10	1	4	0	5	0	8

== Final ==
(H) Western Australia	v	South Australia
535; Tom Moody 162; Tim Zoehrer 81; Colin Miller 7/112		494; Peter Sleep 146*no Terry Alderman 4/117
289/2; Tom Moody 155; Geoff Marsh 105*no

Match Drawn, Western Australia win by virtue of topping the regular season ladder.
Venue: Perth

== Statistics ==
=== Most Runs ===
Tom Moody 1038

=== Most Wickets ===
Tim May 43
