= 1975–76 Sheffield Shield season =

Australian cricket tournament

- Cricket format: First-class
- Tournament format: Double round-robin
- Champions: South Australia (11th title)
- Participants: 5
- Matches: 20
- Player of the series: Ian Chappell (South Australia) & Greg Chappell (Queensland)
- Most runs: Ian Chappell (South Australia) (840)
- Most wickets: Ashley Mallett (South Australia) (38)

The 1975–76 Sheffield Shield season was the 74th season of the Sheffield Shield, the domestic first-class cricket competition of Australia. After finishing last the previous two seasons, South Australia, galvanized by their charismatic captain Ian Chappell, won the championship, losing just once and drawing twice in their 8-match campaign.

== Table ==
Team	Played	Won	Drawn	Lost	Batting points	Bowling points	Total Points
South Australia	8	5	2	1	50	55	105
Queensland	8	4	3	1	40	44	84
Western Australia	8	4	1	3	40	38	78
New South Wales	8	2	1	5	20	51	71
Victoria	8	1	1	6	10	50	60

== Statistics ==
=== Most Runs ===
Ian Chappell 840

=== Most Wickets ===
Ashley Mallett 38
