= 1938–39 Sheffield Shield season =

Australian cricket tournament

- Cricket format: First-class
- Tournament format: Double round-robin
- Champions: South Australia (6th title)
- Participants: 4
- Matches: 12
- Most runs: Bill Brown (Queensland) (990)
- Most wickets: Clarrie Grimmett (South Australia) (27)

The 1938–39 Sheffield Shield season was the 43rd season of the Sheffield Shield, the domestic first-class cricket competition of Australia. South Australia won the championship.

== Table ==
Team	Played	Won	1st Inns Won	1st Inns Lost	Lost	Drawn	Points
South Australia	6	3	1	1	0	1	21
Victoria	6	3	1	0	1	1	20
Queensland	6	2	1	0	3	0	13
New South Wales	6	0	0	2	4	0	2

== Statistics ==
=== Most Runs ===
Bill Brown 990

=== Most Wickets ===
Clarrie Grimmett 27
