= 1966–67 Sheffield Shield season =

Australian cricket tournament

- Cricket format: First-class
- Tournament format: Double round-robin
- Champions: Victoria (20th title)
- Participants: 5
- Matches: 20
- Most runs: Les Favell (South Australia) (785)
- Most wickets: Tony Lock (Western Australia) (51)

The 1966–67 Sheffield Shield season was the 65th season of the Sheffield Shield, the domestic first-class cricket competition of Australia. Victoria won the championship.

== Table ==
Team	Played	Won	1st Inns Won	Drawn	1st Inns Lost	Lost	Points
Victoria	8	2	5	0	0	0	40
South Australia	8	3	1	0	2	2	34
New South Wales	8	3	1	0	4	4	30
Western Australia	8	1	2	0	1	1	22
Queensland	8	1	1	0	3	3	14

== Statistics ==
=== Most Runs ===
Les Favell 785

=== Most Wickets ===
Tony Lock 51
