= 1931–32 Sheffield Shield season =

Australian cricket tournament

- Cricket format: First-class
- Tournament format: Double round-robin
- Champions: New South Wales (19th title)
- Participants: 4
- Matches: 12
- Most runs: Vic Richardson (South Australia) (690)
- Most wickets: Clarrie Grimmett (South Australia) (29)

The 1931–32 Sheffield Shield season was the 36th season of the Sheffield Shield, the domestic first-class cricket competition of Australia. New South Wales won the championship by virtue of having a better average.

== Table ==
Team	Played	Won	1st Inns Won	1st Inns Lost	Lost	Drawn	Points	Average
New South Wales	6	4	0	0	2	0	20	1.400
South Australia	6	4	0	0	2	0	20	1.044
Queensland	6	2	0	0	4	0	10	0.933
Victoria	6	2	0	0	4	0	10	0.750

== Statistics ==
=== Most Runs ===
Vic Richardson 690

=== Most Wickets ===
Clarrie Grimmett 29
