= 1937–38 Sheffield Shield season =

Australian cricket tournament

- Cricket format: First-class
- Tournament format: Double round-robin
- Champions: New South Wales (21st title)
- Participants: 4
- Matches: 12
- Most runs: Don Bradman (South Australia) (983)
- Most wickets: Bill O'Reilly (New South Wales) (33)

The 1937–38 Sheffield Shield season was the 42nd season of the Sheffield Shield, the domestic first-class cricket competition of Australia. New South Wales won the championship.

== Table ==
Team	Played	Won	1st Inns Won	1st Inns Lost	Lost	Drawn	Points
New South Wales	6	3	1	1	0	1	21
South Australia	6	2	1	1	2	0	14
Victoria	6	1	2	1	1	1	14
Queensland	6	0	0	1	3	2	5

== Statistics ==
=== Most Runs ===
Don Bradman 983

=== Most Wickets ===
Bill O'Reilly 33
