= 1995–96 Sheffield Shield season =

Australian cricket tournament

- Cricket format: First-class
- Tournament format(s): Double round-robin & Final
- Champions: South Australia (13th title)
- Participants: 6
- Matches: 31
- Player of the series: Matthew Elliott (Victoria)
- Most runs: Matthew Elliott (Victoria) (1,116)
- Most wickets: Jason Gillespie (South Australia) (46) & Michael Kasprowicz (Queensland) (46)

The 1995–96 Sheffield Shield season was the 94th season of the Sheffield Shield, the domestic first-class cricket competition of Australia. South Australia won the championship, thus making up for their innings and 101 run defeat at the hands of Queensland in the 1994-95 final.

== Table ==
| Team | Played | Won | Lost | Tied | Drawn | N/R | Points |
|---|---|---|---|---|---|---|---|
| South Australia | 10 | 5 | 3 | 0 | 2 | 0 | 34 |
| Western Australia | 10 | 3 | 3 | 0 | 4 | 0 | 30 |
| Queensland | 10 | 4 | 3 | 0 | 3 | 0 | 26 |
| Tasmania | 10 | 3 | 5 | 0 | 2 | 0 | 23 |
| New South Wales | 10 | 3 | 3 | 0 | 4 | 0 | 22 |
| Victoria | 10 | 3 | 4 | 0 | 3 | 0 | 21.7 |

== Final ==
March 30–April 3 1996
Scorecard

| Western Australia | v | South Australia (H) |
| 9/520d (146.4 overs); Adam Gilchrist 189* (187); Jason Gillespie 3/96 (30 overs) | | 347 (142.1 overs); Paul Nobes 103 (260); Brendon Julian 5/95 (30.2 overs) |
| 8/169d (49.5 overs); Tom Moody 72 (130); Jason Gillespie 4/33 (9 overs) | | 9/208 (129 overs); Greg Blewett 72 (275); Brendon Julian 4/56 (29 overs) |

Match Drawn, South Australia won by virtue of topping the regular season ladder
Venue: Adelaide Oval, Adelaide
Umpires: Darrell Hair and Steve Randell

- Western Australia won the toss and elected to bat.

== Statistics ==
=== Most runs ===
| Player | Team | Mat | Inns | NO | Runs | Ave | HS | 100 | 50 |
|---|---|---|---|---|---|---|---|---|---|
| Matthew Elliott | Victoria | 9 | 17 | 2 | 1116 | 74.40 | 203 | 5 | 3 |
| Darren Lehmann | South Australia | 11 | 21 | 1 | 1099 | 54.95 | 161 | 4 | 6 |
| Dene Hills | Tasmania | 10 | 19 | 2 | 914 | 53.76 | 220* | 1 | 6 |
| Justin Langer | Western Australia | 11 | 22 | 1 | 905 | 43.09 | 161 | 4 | 2 |
| Dean Jones | Victoria | 10 | 18 | 0 | 847 | 47.05 | 145 | 2 | 6 |

=== Most wickets ===
| Player | Team | Mat | Inns | Overs | Wkts | Ave | Econ | BBI | BBM | 5 | 10 |
|---|---|---|---|---|---|---|---|---|---|---|---|
| Jason Gillespie | South Australia | 10 | 18 | 329.2 | 46 | 21.78 | 3.04 | 6/68 | 8/119 | 1 | 0 |
| Michael Kasprowicz | Queensland | 9 | 17 | 357.5 | 46 | 23.52 | 3.02 | 6/48 | 10/148 | 5 | 1 |
| Jo Angel | Western Australia | 11 | 21 | 407.4 | 43 | 26.09 | 2.75 | 6/68 | 9/132 | 3 | 0 |
| Tim May | South Australia | 11 | 17 | 516.5 | 43 | 33.02 | 2.74 | 6/83 | 11/171 | 3 | 1 |
| Brendan Julian | Western Australia | 10 | 20 | 357.5 | 41 | 26.53 | 3.04 | 5/41 | 9/151 | 4 | 0 |
