= 1981–82 Sheffield Shield season =

Australian cricket tournament

- Cricket format: First-class
- Tournament format: Double round-robin
- Champions: South Australia (12th title)
- Participants: 6
- Matches: 25
- Player of the series: Kepler Wessels (Queensland)
- Most runs: Kepler Wessels (Queensland) (1015)
- Most wickets: Ian Callen (Victoria) (31)

The 1981–82 Sheffield Shield season was the 80th season of the Sheffield Shield, the domestic first-class cricket competition of Australia. South Australia won the championship. This was the last time that the championship was decided by virtue of the team topping the league ladder. The following season would see the top two teams playing in a final to determine the champions.

== Points table ==
Team	Pld	W	WLF	L	LWF	DWF	DLF	ND	Adj	Pts
South Australia	9	4	0	1	0	2	1	1		74
New South Wales	9	3	1	1	0	2	0	2		72
Western Australia	9	3	0	1	0	1	3	1		54
Tasmania	5	1	0	2	1	0	1	0	16	36
Queensland	9	0	1	2	0	1	3	2		20
Victoria	9	0	0	4	1	3	1	0		16

== Statistics ==
=== Most Runs ===
Kepler Wessels 1015

=== Most Wickets ===
Ian Callen 31
