= 1936–37 Sheffield Shield season =

Australian cricket tournament

- Cricket format: First-class
- Tournament format: Double round-robin
- Champions: Victoria (16th title)
- Participants: 4
- Matches: 12
- Most runs: Keith Rigg (Victoria) (593)
- Most wickets: Chuck Fleetwood-Smith (Victoria) (34)

The 1936–37 Sheffield Shield season was the 41st season of the Sheffield Shield, the domestic first-class cricket competition of Australia. Victoria won the championship.

== Table ==
Team	Played	Won	1st Inns Won	1st Inns Lost	Lost	Drawn	Points
Victoria	6	3	3	0	0	0	24
South Australia	6	3	0	2	1	0	17
New South Wales	6	1	1	2	2	0	10
Queensland	6	1	0	0	5	0	5

== Statistics ==
=== Most Runs ===
Keith Rigg 593

=== Most Wickets ===
Chuck Fleetwood-Smith 34
