= 1968–69 Sheffield Shield season =

Australian cricket tournament

- Cricket format: First-class
- Tournament format: Double round-robin
- Champions: South Australia (9th title)
- Participants: 5
- Matches: 20
- Most runs: Colin Milburn (Western Australia) (811)
- Most wickets: Tony Lock (Western Australia) (46)

The 1968–69 Sheffield Shield season was the 67th season of the Sheffield Shield, the domestic first-class cricket competition of Australia. South Australia won the championship.

== Table ==
Team	Played	Won	1st Inns Won	Drawn	1st Inns Lost	Lost	Points
South Australia	8	5	0	1	1	1	52
Western Australia	8	4	0	0	1	3	44
Queensland	8	5	0	0	0	3	38
Victoria	8	1	3	1	0	3	28
New South Wales	8	1	0	0	1	6	14

== Statistics ==
=== Most Runs ===
Colin Milburn 811

=== Most Wickets ===
Tony Lock 46
