= 1979–80 Sheffield Shield season =

Australian cricket tournament

- Cricket format: First-class
- Tournament format: Double round-robin
- Champions: Victoria (24th title)
- Participants: 6
- Matches: 25
- Player of the series: Ian Chappell (South Australia)
- Most runs: Ian Chappell (South Australia) (713)
- Most wickets: Ashley Mallett (South Australia) (45)

The 1979–80 Sheffield Shield season was the 78th season of the Sheffield Shield, the domestic first-class cricket competition of Australia. Victoria won the championship.

== Table ==
Team	Played	Won	Drawn	Lost	Batting points	Bowling points	Win points	Total Points
Victoria	9	6	2	1	34	36	60	130
South Australia	9	4	2	3	43	38	40	121
New South Wales	9	4	3	2	45	33	40	118
Queensland	9	3	3	3	37	33	30	100
Western Australia	9	1	2	6	33	38	10	81
Tasmania	5	0	2	3	34	32	10	66

== Statistics ==
=== Most Runs ===
Ian Chappell 713

=== Most Wickets ===
Ashley Mallett 45
