= 1927–28 Sheffield Shield season =

Australian cricket tournament

1927–28 Sheffield Shield
- Cricket format: First-class
- Tournament format: Double round-robin
- Champions: Victoria (11th title)
- Participants: 4
- Matches: 12
- Most runs: Bill Ponsford (Victoria) (1217)
- Most wickets: Clarrie Grimmett (South Australia) (42)

The 1927–28 Sheffield Shield season was the 32nd season of the Sheffield Shield, the domestic first-class cricket competition of Australia. Victoria won the championship. The method used to decide the championship was a new points system and matches were limited to five days. Don Bradman played in his maiden first-class match, scoring a century for New South Wales against South Australia.

== Points system ==
- 4 points for a win
- 3 points for a win on first innings
- 1 point for a loss on first innings

== Table ==
| Team | Played | Won | 1st Inns Won | 1st Inns Lost | Lost | Points |
|---|---|---|---|---|---|---|
| Victoria | 6 | 4 | 0 | 2 | 0 | 18 |
| South Australia | 6 | 3 | 0 | 0 | 3 | 12 |
| New South Wales | 6 | 1 | 2 | 1 | 2 | 11 |
| Queensland | 6 | 0 | 2 | 1 | 3 | 7 |

== Statistics ==
=== Most Runs ===
Bill Ponsford 1217

=== Most Wickets ===
Clarrie Grimmett 42
