= 1971–72 Sheffield Shield season =

Australian cricket tournament

- Cricket format: First-class
- Tournament format: Double round-robin
- Champions: Western Australia (3rd title)
- Participants: 5
- Matches: 20
- Most runs: John Inverarity (Western Australia) (641)
- Most wickets: Ashley Mallett (South Australia) (45)

The 1971–72 Sheffield Shield season was the 70th season of the Sheffield Shield, the domestic first-class cricket competition of Australia. Western Australia won the championship. A new points system was introduced.

== Table ==
Team	Played	Won	Drawn	Lost	Batting points	Bowling points	Total Points
Western Australia	8	4	3	1	40	53	93
South Australia	8	4	1	3	40	52	92
New South Wales	8	2	3	3	20	48	68
Victoria	8	3	2	3	32	35	67
Queensland	8	1	3	4	12	27	39

== Statistics ==
=== Most Runs ===
John Inverarity 641

=== Most Wickets ===
Ashley Mallett 45
