= David Ogilvie (cricketer) =

Australian cricketer

Personal information
- Full name: Alan David Ogilvie
- Batting: Right-handed

International information
- National side: Australia
- Test debut (cap 286): 2 December 1977 v India
- Last Test: 28 April 1978 v West Indies

Career statistics
Competition	Tests	First-class
Matches	5	51
Runs scored	178	3,006
Batting average	17.80	34.15
100s/50s	0/0	8/10
Top score	47	194
Balls bowled	–	6
Wickets	–	0
Bowling average	–	–
5 wickets in innings	–	–
10 wickets in match	–	–
Best bowling	–	–
Catches/stumpings	5/–	44/–
- Source: Cricinfo

Alan David Ogilvie (born 3 June 1951) is a former Australian cricketer who played in five Tests from 1977 to 1978 during World Series Cricket.

== Biography ==
Ogilvie attended Brisbane Grammar School where he was a champion sportsman, representing the school in rugby, cricket, tennis, athletics and rowing.

He played for the Queensland state colt side and was picked in the Sheffield Shield team in 1971–72 but was unable to rise past twelfth man for the next two seasons.

He was eventually dropped from the side and lost his spot in the colts, but good grade form in 1974–75 saw him make his first class debut for Queensland.

=== 1977–78 Season ===
Ogilvie started the 1977–78 season extremely well, scoring consecutive centuries against Victoria, Western Australia, and South Australia.

This saw him selected to play at number three in an Australian team weakened by the defections of senior players to World Series Cricket to play India.

==== Test selection ====
Ogilvie made his Test debut in Brisbane and was dismissed cheaply in his first innings, but shared a partnership of 97 with captain Bob Simpson in the second, rescuing Australia from 3–7. These runs proved crucial in Australia's eventual win.

His performance in the second Test was nearly identical – a low score in the first innings, but a painstaking 47 in the second, helping take Australia from 2–33 to 3-172 and set up a two-wicket victory.

These performances encouraged the selectors to persevere with Ogilvie for the next two tests. However he failed twice in the third Test and was made twelfth man for the fourth test, before being dropped for the fifth. Indian spinner Bishen Bedi claimed his wicket six out of eight innings.

==== West Indian tour ====
Ogilvie continued to score well in the Sheffield Shield and ultimately ended up making 1215 runs at an average of 50.62 for the season. However, he was not originally chosen for the tour of the West Indies, causing protest from Queensland cricketing circles. This was seconded by Ian Chappell who said Ogilvie "was generally regarded as the best player of quick bowling" among the non-WSC players and felt during the Indian series he had "shown a willingness to hang around and try to graft a score, something I can't say for most of the other players. Some of whom are continualy rated highly promising." (Chappell gave the example of Kim Hughes.) Ogilvie was eventually picked as a backup player when Kim Hughes fell ill and Peter Toohey was injured.

He scored 47 against Guyana and played in the third test, where he failed twice, and was not picked for the fourth test. However, a half century as opener in a tour game against Jamaica saw him back in the team for the last test, where he almost repeated a familiar pattern – low score in the first innings, 40-odd in the second innings helping set up a victory – but the game was called off early because of a crowd riot.

=== End of career ===
Ogilvie's form fell away during the 1978–79 season and he was not picked for Australia again that summer. He played his last first class game in 1979 and then retired from the game.

He retired from being a teacher and counselor at Brisbane Boys College in 2024.
