= Ian Lee (cricketer) =

Australian rules footballer, born 1914

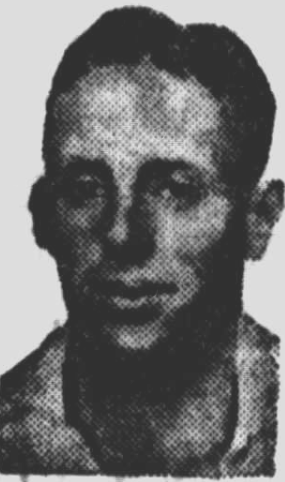

Personal information
- Full name: Ian Somerville Lee
- Born: 24 March 1914; Brunswick, Victoria, Australia
- Died: 14 April 1976 (aged 62); Port Melbourne, Australia
- Batting: Left-handed
- Role: Batsman

Domestic team information
- Years: Team
- 1931–1941: Victoria

Career statistics
Competition	First-class
Matches	55
Runs scored	3,481
Batting average	38.25
100s/50s	7/20
Top score	258
Balls bowled	48
Wickets	0
Bowling average	–
5 wickets in innings	–
10 wickets in match	–
Best bowling	–
Catches/stumpings	31/–
- Source: CricketArchive, 15 August 2022

Ian Somerville Lee (24 March 1914 – 14 April 1976) was an Australian first-class cricketer who represented Victoria mostly during the 1930s.

Lee batted in the top order, often opening the innings. He scored seven first-class hundreds for Victoria but was also dismissed in the 90s on six occasions. His highest score of 258 came in 1934 against Tasmania at the Melbourne Cricket Ground, opening the batting. He put on 428 runs with his captain Stanley Quin for the fourth wicket which as of 2008 remains a Victorian record. The left-hander also made a century against the Marylebone Cricket Club, his 160 at the MCG coming against a side featuring England Test players Gubby Allen, Ken Farnes and Bill Voce.

Lee played district cricket primarily for St Kilda, with one season for the VCA Colts. In the winter of 1934 Lee appeared in two Australian rules football games for Victorian Football League club South Melbourne, a year in which they would reach the Grand Final. His games were against Hawthorn and Richmond, in rounds five and six respectively.
