= Frank Ward (cricketer, born 1906) =

Australian cricketer

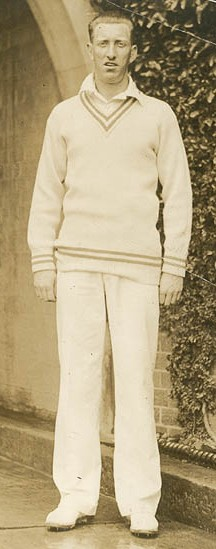

Personal information
- Born: 23 February 1906; Sydney, New South Wales, Australia
- Died: 25 March 1974 (aged 68); Brooklyn, New South Wales,
- Batting: Right-handed
- Bowling: Legbreak googly

International information
- National side: Australia
- Test debut (cap 158): 4 December 1936 v England
- Last Test: 10 June 1938 v England

Career statistics
Competition	Test	First-class
Matches	4	66
Runs scored	36	871
Batting average	6.00	13.82
100s/50s	0/0	0/1
Top score	18	62
Balls bowled	1,268	15,207
Wickets	11	320
Bowling average	52.18	24.68
5 wickets in innings	1	24
10 wickets in match	0	5
Best bowling	6/102	7/51
Catches/stumpings	1/–	42/–
- Source: Cricinfo, 14 October 2022

Francis Anthony Ward (23 February 1906 – 25 March 1974) was an Australian cricketer who played in four Test matches from 1936 to 1938. On his debut, he took six wickets in the second innings against England at Brisbane in 1936.
