= 1962–63 Sheffield Shield season =

Australian cricket tournament

- Cricket format: First-class
- Tournament format: Double round-robin
- Champions: Victoria (19th title)
- Participants: 5
- Matches: 20
- Most runs: Bob Cowper (Victoria) (813)
- Most wickets: Ian Meckiff (Victoria) (47)

The 1962–63 Sheffield Shield season was the 61st season of the Sheffield Shield, the domestic first-class cricket competition of Australia. Victoria won the championship which ended the winning streak of New South Wales at nine.

== Table ==
Team	Played	Won	1st Inns Won	Drawn	1st Inns Lost	Lost	Points
Victoria	8	4	2	0	1	1	48
South Australia	8	3	2	0	1	2	38
New South Wales	8	3	1	0	1	3	34
Western Australia	8	2	0	0	0	6	24
Queensland	8	2	1	0	3	2	20

== Statistics ==
=== Most Runs ===
Bob Cowper 813

=== Most Wickets ===
Ian Meckiff 47
