= 1970–71 Sheffield Shield season =

Australian cricket tournament

- Cricket format: First-class
- Tournament format: Double round-robin
- Champions: South Australia (10th title)
- Participants: 5
- Matches: 20
- Most runs: Barry Richards (South Australia) (1101)
- Most wickets: Ross Duncan (Queensland) (34)

The 1970–71 Sheffield Shield season was the 69th season of the Sheffield Shield, the domestic first-class cricket competition of Australia. South Australia won the championship.

== Table ==
Team	Played	Won	1st Inns Won	Drawn	1st Inns Lost	Lost	Points
South Australia	8	3	3	0	2	0	42
Victoria	8	2	3	2	1	0	32
Western Australia	8	2	1	0	3	2	24
New South Wales	8	1	3	1	1	2	20
Queensland	8	0	0	1	3	4	10

== Statistics ==
=== Most Runs ===
Barry Richards 1101

=== Most Wickets ===
Ross Duncan 34
