= Walter McDonald (cricketer) =

Australian cricketer

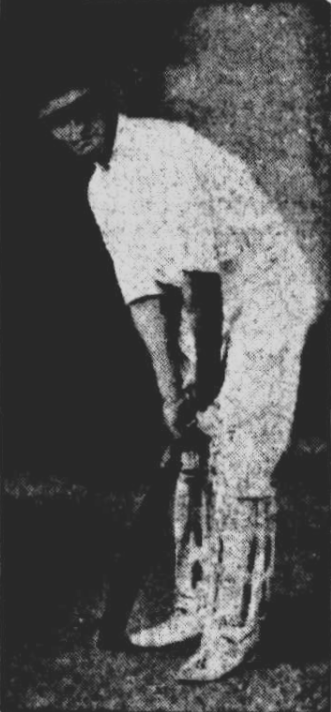

Personal information
- Born: 24 March 1884; Melbourne, Australia
- Died: 22 March 1955 (aged 70); Melbourne, Australia

Domestic team information
- Years: Team
- 1922: Victoria
- 1924 - 1925: Queensland
- 1929: Tasmania
- Source: Cricinfo, 20 November 2015

Walter "Pudger" McDonald (24 March 1884 – 22 March 1955) was an Australian cricketer. He played one first-class cricket match for Victoria, two for Queensland, and one for Tasmania between 1922 and 1929.

McDonald began his cricket career as an allrounder in Victorian country cricket playing games in Warrnambool. He worked for the National Bank in Warrnambool and was transferred to Mildura where he continued to play cricket. His cricket development was limited by only playing country cricket where many of the wickets were concrete.

At some point McDonald was transferred to Melbourne where he joined the Melbourne Cricket Club and began competing in district cricket, primarily as a bowler, before being transferred to Townsville in 1923 where he became prominent in cricket as a player and administrator, and he was later described as the best allrounder the city had ever had. In 1928 he was transferred to Launceston and his arrival was viewed as a positive sign for Northern Tasmanian cricket.

== See also ==
- List of Victoria first-class cricketers
- List of Tasmanian representative cricketers
