= David Hourn =

Australian cricketer

Personal information
- Full name: David William Hourn
- Born: 9 September 1949 (age 77); Sydney, Australia
- Batting: Right-handed
- Bowling: Slow left-arm wrist-spin
- Role: Bowler

Domestic team information
- Years: Team
- 1970-71 to 1981-82: New South Wales

Career statistics
Competition	First-class
Matches	44
Runs scored	220
Batting average	6.66
100s/50s	0/0
Top score	27
Balls bowled	9572
Wickets	164
Bowling average	28.71
5 wickets in innings	11
10 wickets in match	2
Best bowling	9/77
Catches/stumpings	12/0
- Source: ESPNcricinfo, 8 May 2020

David Hourn (born 9 September 1949) is a former Australian cricketer. He played 44 first-class matches for New South Wales between 1970/71 and 1981/82.

Hourn spun the ball sharply, especially when he bowled his wrong 'un, and could beat the best batsmen. His best seasons came in 1977-78 (49 wickets at 21.97) and 1978-79 (42 wickets at 31.71). Even though Australia's spin stocks had been depleted by defections to World Series Cricket, Hourn was not picked for any Australian teams, the selectors preferring Tony Mann, Bruce Yardley, Jim Higgs and Peter Sleep.

Hourn took 629 wickets at an average of 19.56 in first-grade cricket for Waverley, a club record.

== Career ==
Hourn made his first class debut in 1970-71 against South Australia taking 0-69. He played in 1971-72 and took one wicket against Queensland.

Hourn's next first class game was in 1974-75. He took 3-69 against the touring English side, then next played in 1975-76 when he took 5-68 and 3-58 against WA. There were no wickets against South Australia, 2-61 against the West Indies, then 4 for 65 and 5 for 60 against Victoria.

In 1976-77 Hourn took 3-41 and 5-67 against Queensland and 6-84 against Tasmania.

Hourn injured his hand early during the 1977-78 season, but had a successful summer, taking more wickets than anyone else in the Sheffield Shield, 48 wickets at 20.72, including figures of 4-93 against Queensland, 6-67 in another game against Queensland, 4-61 and 3-35 against WA, 7 for 71 and 5 for 42 against South Australia, and 7-80 and 2-40 against Tasmania.

The following season, he took 9 for 77 in the first innings against Victoria. He took 42 wickets for the summer, but was not picked to tour India.

Ian Chappell wrote in a 1977 article about Hourn and fellow spinner Jim Higgs: "in my opinion neither of them are real cricketers. By that I mean they are only bowlers, not cricketers. They are both well below standard as fieldsmen and batsmen." Poor eyesight and knee injuries later in his career did not help Hourn's batting and fielding.

His later career was also affected by problems with his bowling rhythm which led to his chronically over-stepping the crease. In one first-grade match for Waverley he bowled 26 no-balls.

== See also ==
- List of New South Wales representative cricketers
