= Pat Crawford =

Australian cricketer

Personal information
- Full name: William Patrick Anthony Crawford
- Born: 3 August 1933; Dubbo, New South Wales
- Died: 21 January 2009 (aged 75); Bexley, New South Wales
- Batting: Right-handed
- Bowling: Right-arm fast
- Role: Bowler

International information
- National side: Australia
- Test debut (cap 202): 21 June 1956 v England
- Last Test: 6 November 1956 v India

Domestic team information
- Years: Team
- 1954/55–1957/58: New South Wales

Career statistics
Competition	Test	First-class
Matches	4	37
Runs scored	53	424
Batting average	17.66	19.27
100s/50s	0/0	0/1
Top score	34	86
Balls bowled	437	5,568
Wickets	7	110
Bowling average	15.28	19.27
5 wickets in innings	0	5
10 wickets in match	0	1
Best bowling	3/28	6/55
Catches/stumpings	1/–	18/–
- Source: CricketArchive, 21 January 2009

William Patrick Anthony Crawford (3 August 1933 – 21 January 2009) was an Australian cricketer who played in four Tests, including one in England at Lord's in 1956 and three in India in 1956–57. He was born in Dubbo, New South Wales.

He was a right-arm fast bowler.

During the 1956 tour to England, Crawford was denied permission to have his pregnant wife accompany him on the sea voyage by the Australian Board of Control under its policy against spouses travelling with the team; she travelled separately.

Crawford suffered an injury during his debut Test at Lord's and bowled only 29 balls.
