= Geff Noblet =

Australian cricketer

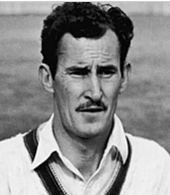
- Noblet in 1952

Personal information
- Full name: Geffery Noblet
- Born: 14 September 1916; Adelaide, South Australia, Australia
- Died: 16 August 2006 (aged 89); Adelaide, South Australia, Australia
- Batting: Right-handed
- Bowling: Right-arm fast-medium

International information
- National side: Australia
- Test debut (cap 184): 3 March 1950 v South Africa
- Last Test: 6 February 1953 v South Africa

Domestic team information
- Years: Team
- 1945/46–1952/53: South Australia

Career statistics
Competition	Test	First-class
Matches	3	71
Runs scored	22	975
Batting average	7.33	13.92
100s/50s	0/0	0/2
Top score	13*	55*
Balls bowled	774	18,365
Wickets	7	282
Bowling average	26.14	19.26
5 wickets in innings	0	13
10 wickets in match	0	2
Best bowling	3/21	7/29
Catches/stumpings	1/–	44/–
- Source: Cricinfo, 14 October 2022

Geffery Noblet OAM (14 September 1916 – 16 August 2006) was an Australian cricketer who played in three Test matches from 1950 to 1953.

Noblet was a fast-medium bowler who played first-class cricket for South Australia from 1945 to 1953. His bowling performance in the 1948–49 Australian domestic season was the best by a South Australian bowler in 38 seasons. He took 38 wickets at 15.4, the best for any South Australian taking ten wickets or more in a season since Robert Rees took 10/129 in 1909–10.

Following Noblet's selection in the Australian team to tour South Africa in 1949–50, the South Australian Cricket Association presented Noblet and fellow South Australian Gil Langley with a gift of their choosing. Noblet asked for a set of coffee tables and Langley a combination of a standard electric lamp, coffee tray and ashtray.

Noblet got his unusual first name when a family friend, given the task of registering the birth, spelt Noblet's first name as Geffery rather than Jeffery. Noblet himself was not aware of the legal spelling of his name until adulthood when he saw his birth certificate.

Noblet was awarded the Medal of the Order of Australia in 1995 for service to cricket.

During World War Two Noblet served in the transport division of the Australian Army.

Preceded by Dattu Phadkar	Nelson Cricket Club; Professional; 1955–1956	Succeeded by Baloo Gupte
