= South Australia cricket team =

Australian domestic cricket team

South Australia

Personnel
- Captain: (Australia) Nathan McSweeney
- Coach: (Australia) Ryan Harris

Team information
- Colours: Red Gold Blue
- Founded: 1887; 139 years ago
- Home ground: Adelaide Oval; Karen Rolton Oval
- Capacity: 53,585; 5,000

History
- First-class debut: Tasmania in 1887 at Adelaide Oval
- Sheffield Shield wins: 15 (1894, 1910, 1913, 1927, 1936, 1939, 1953, 1964, 1969, 1971, 1976, 1982, 1996, 2025, 2026)
- One Day Cup wins: 4 (1984, 1987, 2012, 2025)
- Big Bash wins: 1 (2011)
- Official website: SACA
First-class
One-day

The South Australia men's cricket team is an Australian men's professional first-class cricket team based in the state of South Australia. South Australia play their home matches at Adelaide Oval and Karen Rolton Oval, they are the state cricket team for South Australia representing the state in the Sheffield Shield competition and the limited overs One-Day Cup. The team is selected and supported by the South Australian Cricket Association (SACA).

The team's One-Day Cup uniform features a red body with gold and blue elements, the state's colours. They were known as the Southern Redbacks from 1995 to 2024, and officially competed under the West End Redbacks moniker from 1996 to 2024 due to a sponsorship agreement with West End. The Redbacks formerly competed in the now-defunct KFC Twenty20 Big Bash, but were succeeded by the Adelaide Strikers in 2011 because this league was replaced with the Big Bash League.

== History ==
The former logo used while the team was known as the West End Redbacks.

The earliest known first-class match played by South Australia took place against Tasmania on the Adelaide Oval in November 1877. In 1892–93, they joined New South Wales and Victoria and played the inaugural Sheffield Shield season. South Australia won the Shield in just their second attempt. They have won the competition 15 times in total while they have won the One Day tournament four times. They are also the current holders of the KFC 20/20 Big Bash trophy, defeating NSW in the 2010/11 final at Adelaide Oval. They will continue to hold the KFC Twenty20 Big Bash trophy, as the league is now defunct and has been replaced by the Big Bash League.

Over the years, many successful international cricketers have played for South Australia. Clarrie Grimmett played with them during the 1920s and '30s, taking a total of 668 wickets. This remains a state record. In 1934, Sir Donald Bradman moved to South Australia and joined the team after originally playing with New South Wales, and he started with scores of 117, 233 and 357 in his first three innings. Others include the Chappell brothers (Ian and Greg), David Hookes, Darren Lehmann, Gil Langley, Jason Gillespie, and Terry Jenner.

South Australia has also imported cricketers to play for them, with the most famous being Sir Gary Sobers, who appeared in three seasons during the early 1960s, and Barry Richards. Richards played just one season with South Australia but managed to set a state record for most runs in a season, making 1101 runs in the 1970–71 season.

== Squad ==
Squad for the 2024/25 domestic season. Players with international caps are listed in bold.

No.	Name	Nationality	Birth date	Batting style	Bowling style	Notes
Batters
3	Kyle Brazell	Australia	20 September 2001 (age 25)	Left-handed	Slow left-arm orthodox	Rookie contract
15	Mackenzie Harvey	Australia	18 September 2000 (age 26)	Left-handed	Right-arm medium-fast	
22	Henry Hunt	Australia	7 January 1997 (age 29)	Right-handed	Right-arm medium	
23	**Jake Fraser-McGurk**	Australia	11 April 2002 (age 24)	Right-handed	Right-arm leg spin	
31	Thomas Kelly	Australia	14 December 2000 (age 25)	Right-handed	—N/a	
33	Jake Lehmann	Australia	8 July 1992 (age 34)	Left-handed	Slow left-arm orthodox	
34	**Travis Head**	Australia	29 December 1993 (age 32)	Left-handed	Right-arm off break	Cricket Australia contract
37	Conor McInerney	Australia	30 March 1994 (age 32)	Left-handed	Slow left-arm orthodox	
47	Daniel Drew	Australia	22 May 1996 (age 30)	Right-handed	Right–arm off break	
50	Jason Sangha	Australia	8 September 1999 (age 27)	Right-handed	Right–arm leg break	
All-rounders
6	Liam Scott	Australia	12 December 2000 (age 25)	Right-handed	Right-arm fast-medium	
38	**Nathan McSweeney**	Australia	8 March 1999 (age 27)	Right-handed	Right-arm off break	Captain
-	Aidan Cahill	Australia	20 March 2003 (age 23)	Right-handed	Right-arm medium-fast	Rookie contract
Wicket-keepers
4	Harry Nielsen	Australia	3 May 1995 (age 31)	Left-handed	—N/a	
5	**Alex Carey**	Australia	27 August 1991 (age 35)	Left-handed	—N/a	Cricket Australia contract
7	Harry Matthias	Australia	25 June 2003 (age 23)	Right-handed	—N/a	Rookie contract
Pace bowlers
0	Nathan McAndrew	Australia	14 July 1993 (age 33)	Right-handed	Right-arm medium-fast	
9	**Wes Agar**	Australia	5 February 1997 (age 29)	Right-handed	Right-arm fast	
13	Harry Conway	Australia	17 September 1992 (age 34)	Right-handed	Right-arm fast-medium	
21	Jordan Buckingham	Australia	17 March 2000 (age 26)	Left-handed	Right-arm fast-medium	
35	Brendan Doggett	Australia	3 April 1994 (age 32)	Right-handed	Right-arm fast-medium	
45	**Spencer Johnson**	Australia	16 December 1995 (age 30)	Left-handed	Left-arm fast	
58	Henry Thornton	Australia	13 December 1996 (age 29)	Right-handed	Right-arm fast	
10	Campbell Thompson	Australia	18 January 2004 (age 22)	–	Left-arm medium-fast	Rookie contract
Spin bowlers
46	**Ben Manenti**	Italy	23 March 1997 (age 29)	Right-handed	Right-arm off break	
24	Lloyd Pope	Australia	1 December 1999 (age 26)	Right-handed	Right-arm leg break	

== Honours ==
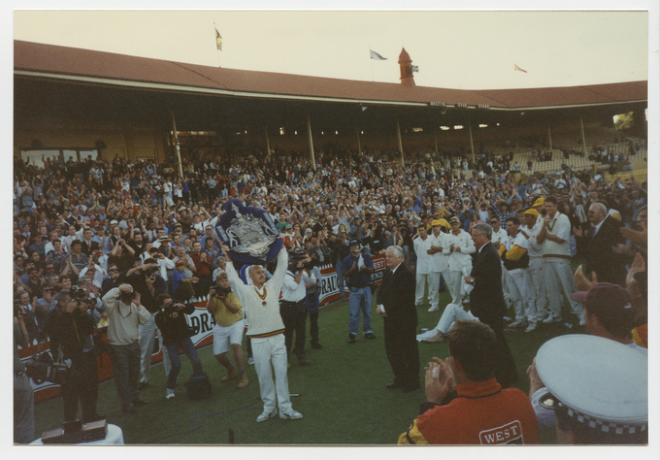
Jamie Siddons, captain of the South Australian Cricket Team which defeated Western Australia, holds the Sheffield Shield above his head, 3 April 1996.

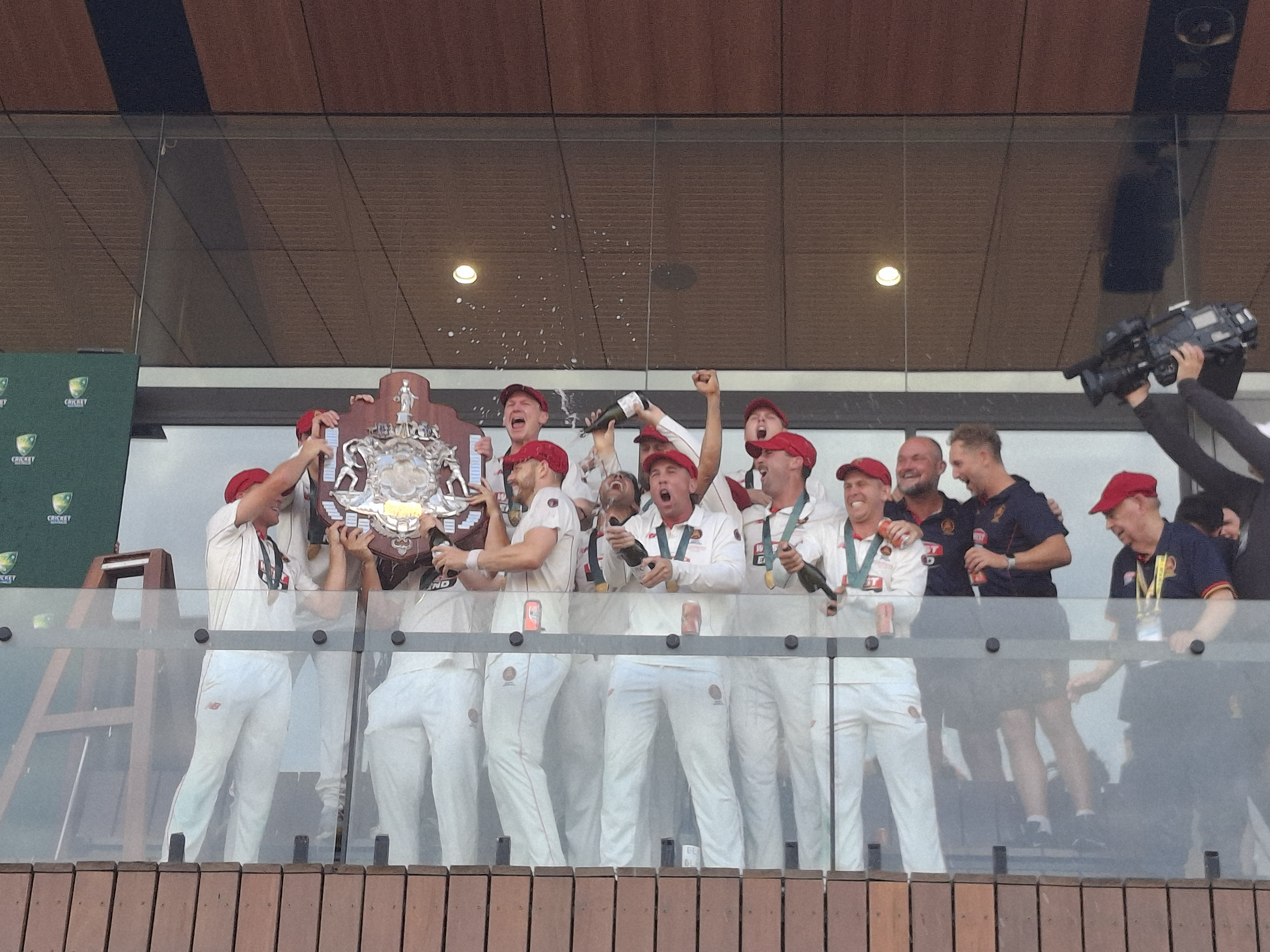
The South Australian team celebrate winning the Sheffield Shield, 29 March 2025.

- Sheffield Shield
  - Winners (15): 1893–94, 1909–10, 1912–13, 1926–27, 1935–36, 1938–39, 1952–53, 1963–64, 1968–69, 1970–71, 1975–76, 1981–82, 1995–96, 2024–25, 2025–26
  - Runners-up (22): 1894–95, 1896–97, 1897–98, 1906–07, 1907–08, 1908–09, 1910–11, 1913–14, 1927–28, 1931–32, 1936–37, 1937–38, 1939–40, 1962–63, 1966–67, 1971–72, 1972–73, 1979–80, 1988–89, 1994–95, 2015–16, 2016–17
- One-Day Cup
  - Winners (4): 1983–84, 1986–87, 2011–12, 2024–25
  - Runners-up (8): 1984–85, 1987–88, 1989–90, 1994–95, 2005–06, 2015–16, 2017–18, 2022–23
- Twenty20 Big Bash
  - Winners (1): 2010–11
  - Runners-up (1): 2009–10

== Records ==
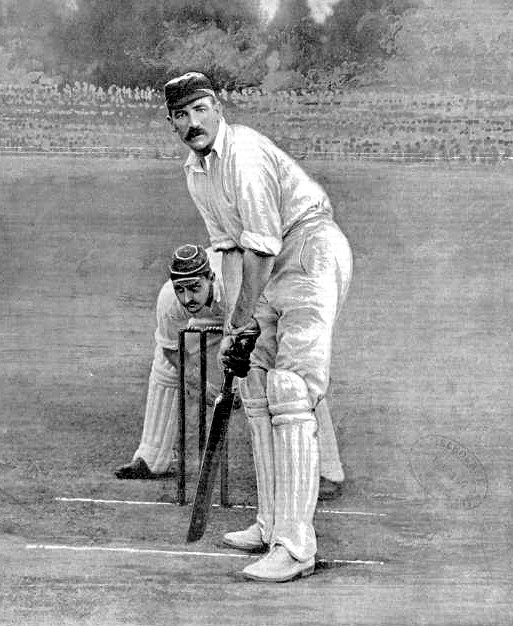
George Giffen

=== First-class Records ===
Most first-class runs for South Australia

Player	Runs	Average	Innings
Darren Lehmann	11,945	57.15	224
Greg Blewett	10,003	46.09	230
David Hookes	9,785	47.27	216
Les Favell	8,610	38.09	230
Callum Ferguson	8,371	38.05	239
Ian Chappell	7,887	52.58	164
Neil Dansie	7,079	35.04	210
Peter Sleep	6,656	36.37	226
Clem Hill	6,631	52.21	133
Andrew Hilditch	6,547	41.96	167

Most first-class wickets for South Australia

Player	Wickets	Average	Innings
Clarrie Grimmett	546	25.89	158
Ashley Mallett	353	24.11	145
Chadd Sayers	279	25.86	129
Tim May	277	37.31	138
Peter Sleep	273	38.99	218
Joe Mennie	256	27.11	129
George Giffen	240	26.91	70
Peter McIntyre	237	40.03	115
Geff Noblet	225	17.99	81
Terry Jenner	213	30.98	120

=== List A Records ===
Most List A runs for South Australia

Player	Runs	Average	Innings
Darren Lehmann	4,088	55.24	89
Callum Ferguson	4,085	40.44	111
Greg Blewett	3,645	40.50	100
Tom Cooper	3,023	39.77	85
Michael Klinger	2,524	52.58	51
Mark Cosgrove	1,978	32.42	64
Graham Manou	1,554	22.20	94
Alex Carey*	1,494	36.43	43
Travis Head*	1,406	41.35	35
Jake Weatherald	1,383	36.39	39

Most List A wickets for South Australia

Player	Wickets	Average	Innings
Shaun Tait	103	22.92	53
Kane Richardson	84	30.64	52
Paul Wilson	75	23.42	48
Jason Gillespie	70	29.87	54
Mark Cleary	67	30.92	49
Greg Blewett	63	33.07	68
Mark Harrity	58	27.29	41
Gary Putland	54	29.38	34
Dan Christian	54	33.33	42
Jake Haberfield	52	21.38	29

== 'All Time Best Team' ==
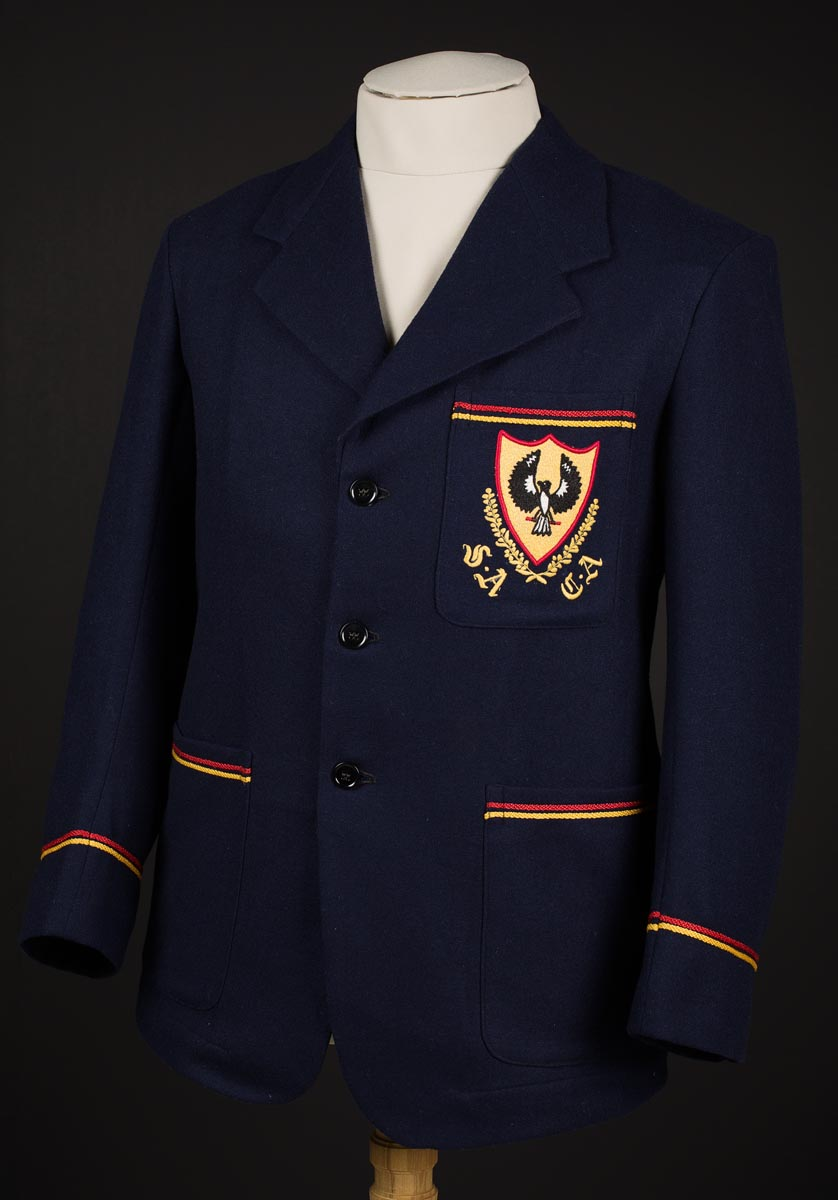
Don Bradman's South Australian team blazer.

In 2024 SACA members voted for and selected a greatest ever South Australian Men's team consisting of 12 players - called the 'All Time Best Team'.

Men's All Time Best Team
Clem Hill
Greg Blewett
Sir Donald Bradman
Ian Chappell
Greg Chappell
Darren Lehmann
Sir Garfield Sobers
Barry Jarman
Clarrie Grimmett
Jason Gillespie
Rodney Hogg
Geff Noblet

== See also ==
- List of South Australian representative cricketers
