= Curator of Adelaide Oval =

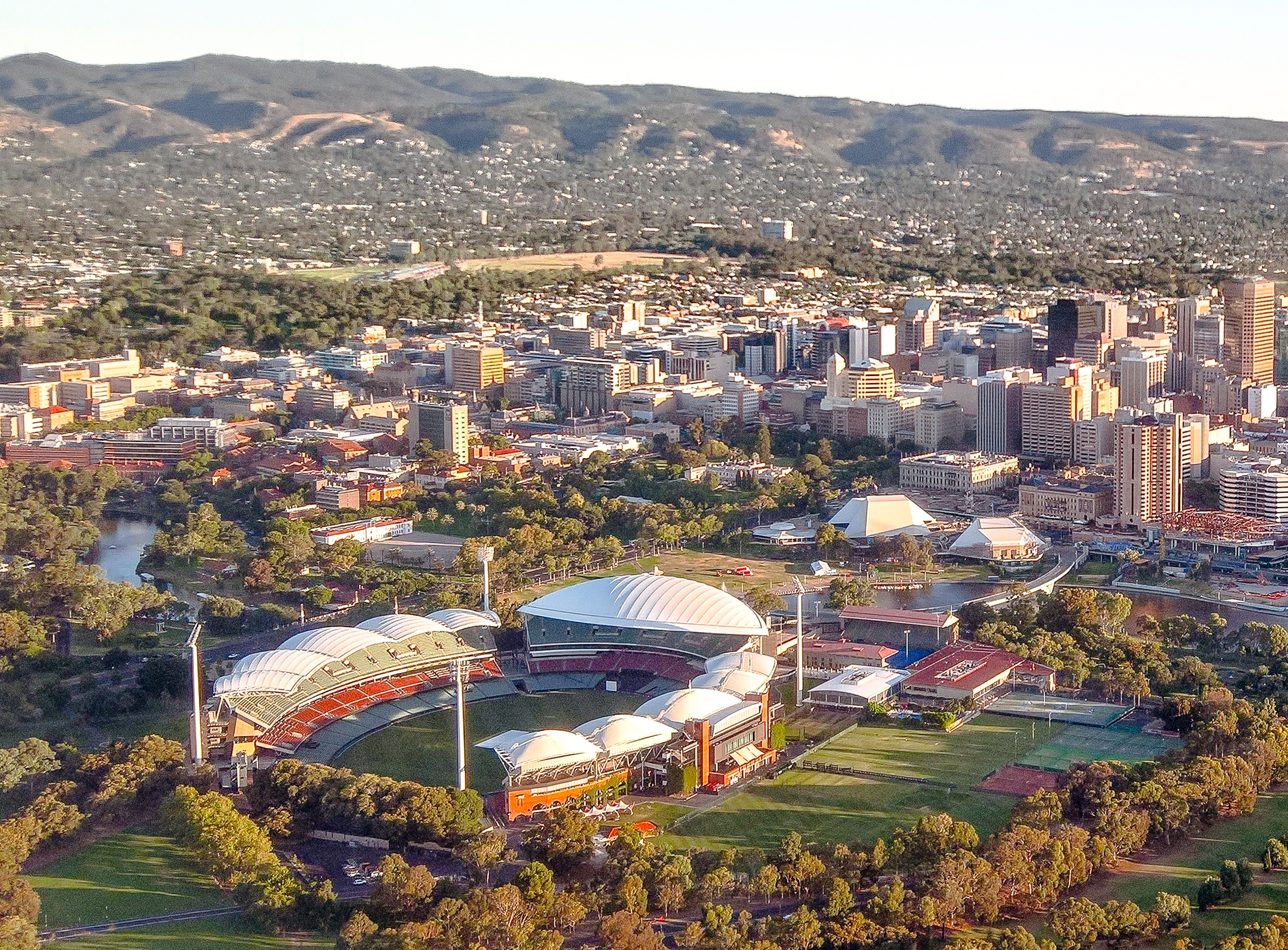
- Adelaide Oval
- Incumbent; Damian Hough since 2010
- Formation: 1872; 154 years ago
- First holder: George Gooden
- Website: adelaideoval.com.au

The Curator of Adelaide Oval. The current Curator of Adelaide Oval is Damian Hough who assumed the role in 2010.

List of curators of Adelaide Oval
No.	Photo	Name	Tenure Begin	Tenure End	Tenure In Years	Key Notes
1		George Gooden	1872	1873	1 Year	First Curator
2		Thomas Dickson	1875	1878	3 Years	
3		Jesse Hide	1878	1883	5 Years	English Cricketer
4		Charlie Checkett	1883	1919	36 Years	Longest serving curator
5		George Dunn	1919	1920	1 Year	Australian Cricketer
6		Albert Wright	Oct 1920	Dec 23rd 1938	18 Years and 2 months	First Class Cricketer. Died while curator
7		Stan Williams	1939	1953	14 Years	Australian Footballer
8		Arthur Lance	1953	1980	27 Years	Australian Footballer
9		Les Burdett	1980	2010	30 Years	Got the Order of Australia
10		Damian Hough	2010	Present	16 Years	Current Curator
