= Damian Hough =

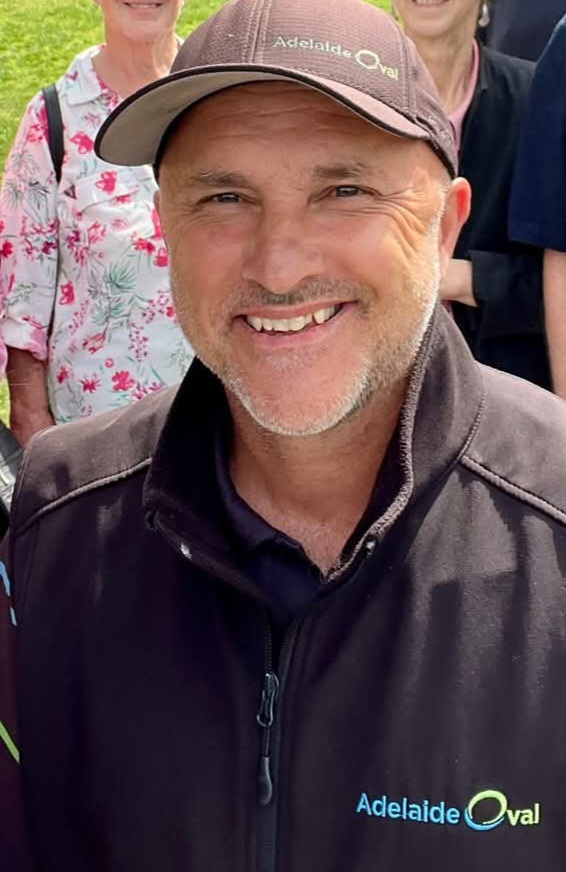
- Hough c. 2025
- Occupation: Curator of the Adelaide Oval
- Years active: 2010–

Damian Hough is the current curator of the Adelaide Oval. He succeeded Les Burdett. Hough has been the 10th Adelaide Oval Curator since 2010.

== Adelaide Oval's curator ==
In 2010 Damian Hough became the 10th curator of the Adelaide Oval succeeding Les Burdett. As the current curator Hough has access to some tools that his predecessors like Albert Wright and Charlie Checkett did not have like the 420 tonnes of heavy clay soil from Athelstone that Lance, Burdett and Damian have all used and the drop-in pitches. Damian is also able to use chemicals on the turf and uses some tools like a shovel. Hough helped prepare pitches for the 2024 Men's T20 World Cup in New York. 97% of people rated the Adelaide Oval the best pitch in the nation.

== Adelaide Oval Turf Solutions ==
Adelaide Oval Turf Solutions established in late 2023 brings its workmanship to sporting grounds, clubs and community spaces across South Australia and beyond. In 2025 Adelaide Oval Turf Solutions was shortlisted for global innovation award due to there work in the 2024 ICC Men’s T20 World Cup.

== Legacy ==
In 2024 during the Australia v. West Indies Test cricket match at the Adelaide Oval the SACA unveiled an honour board for the curators of the oval.
