= Checketts =

Checketts is a surname. Notable people with the surname include:

- Andrew Checketts (born 1975), American college baseball player and coach
- Dave Checketts (born 1956), American businessman
- David Checketts (born 1930), Private Secretary to the Prince of Wales
- Johnny Checketts (1912–2006), New Zealand flying ace

== See also ==
- Charlie Checkett (c. 1856-1930), curator of the Adelaide Oval
