= Lindsay Wright =

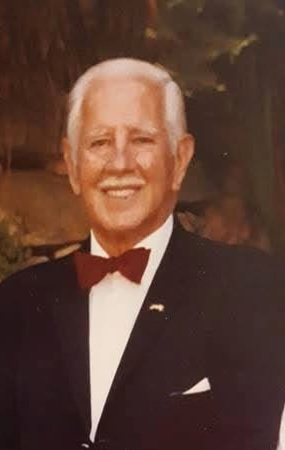
- Wright c. 1990
- Born: 28 September 1911; South Australia
- Died: 29 November 1993 (aged 82)

Percival Lindsay Wright (September 28, 1911 – 29 November 1993) was a long serving Gatekeeper at the Adelaide Oval and Received many items from SACA. He was the youngest son of former curator of the Adelaide Oval Albert Wright.

== Early life ==
Born in 1911 to Albert Wright and Clara Doran. He married Patricia Wyllie Hocking on the 29th of June 1940. Lindsay had in 1925 played for Sturt street for two years. He was a member of the South Australian team in the schoolboy carnival games Having had the benefit of tuition by George Giffen (former champion international all-rounder) Lindsay showed promise with the bat.

== Military ==
Lindsay Wright joined the Australian Army on December 27, 1941, in Glenelg, SA.

== Career ==
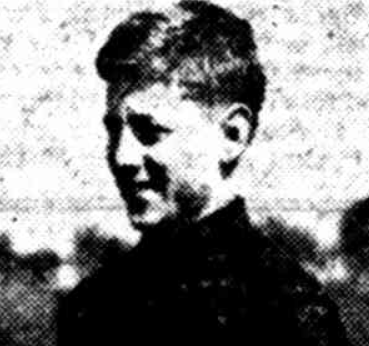
Lindsay Wright c.1925

Lindsay made his League debut in R3 of 1932 for a victory over South Adelaide on the Prospect Oval. He played 7 League games to R10 in a year in which the B team won the Premiership over Norwood. Between 1931 and 1935 Lindsay played football at North Adelaide. He is a part of the North Adelaide Football Club Honour Roll. He played 16 Games throughout his career. In 1933 he was awarded the trophy of Best Unemployed. The award recognises a player who is on the rise from a lower status. In 1935 he received the Best Placed Man award.

Lindsay started working as a gatekeeper at the Adelaide Oval in the late 1930s and finished 16 years after he started.

== Death ==
Wright died on November 19, 1993, aged 82.

== Legacy ==
When Lindsay retired SACA members gave him a gold cigarette lighter and SACA president Jim Grose wrote him a letter of tribute. Lindsay and his wife were Luncheon Guests of SACA. He has a picket at the North Adelaide Football Club. (Picket 332)
