= 1894 SAFA Grand Final =

Australian football championship matches

Norwood	South Adelaide
4.7	3.5
	1	2	3	4
NOR	1.1	2.4	2.5	4.7
STH	2.4	2.4	3.5	3.5
- Date: Saturday 10 October (2:00 pm)
- Stadium: Adelaide Oval
- Attendance: 9,000

The 1894 SAFA Grand Final refers to the concluding championship matches of the 1894 SAFA season. As Norwood and South Adelaide finished equal on premiership points, a playoff match for the premiership was required.

The Grand Final between Norwood and South Adelaide was drawn. Despite a provision for 20 minute periods of extra time in the event of a draw, the match was abandoned after full time due to darkness; the result stood and a replay was ordered.

The replay was won by Norwood, with Anthony "Bos" Daly kicking the winning goal as the final bell rang. This was the first replay of a drawn Grand Final in the SANFL.

== 1894 SAFA Premiership Football Match ==
Grand Final
Saturday 6 October (3:00 pm)	Norwood	drew with	South Adelaide	Adelaide Oval
0.0; 1.3; 2.4; 4.8	Q1; Q2; Q3; Final	1.5; 1.5; 3.8; 4.8
Despite a provision for 20 minutes of extra time in the event of a draw, the match was abandoned after full time due to darkness; the result stood and a replay was ordered.

== 1894 SAFA Premiership Football Match Replay ==
Grand Final Replay
Saturday 10 October (2:00 pm)	Norwood	def.	South Adelaide	Adelaide Oval (crowd: 9,000)
1.1; 2.4; 2.5; 4.8	Q1; Q2; Q3; Final	2.4; 2.4; 3.5; 3.5
