= Stan Williams (Australian footballer) =

Australian rules footballer

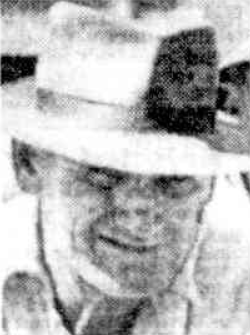
- Williams c. 1950

Personal information
- Full name: Stanley J. Williams
- Born: 19 July 1891
- Died: 25 May 1966 (aged 74)
- Original team: North Adelaide
- Height: 178 cm (5 ft 10 in)
- Weight: 73 kg (161 lb)

Playing career^{1}
Years	Club	Games (Goals)
1920–1922	St Kilda	32 (0)
- ^{1} Playing statistics correct to the end of 1922.

Stanley J. "Dick" Williams (19 July 1891 – 25 May 1966) was an Australian rules footballer who played with St Kilda in the Victorian Football League (VFL). He was the 7th Adelaide Oval Curator. from 1939 to 1 June 1953. He was preceded by Albert Wright and succeeded by Arthur Lance.

== Footballer ==
Williams, a half back, started his career at North Adelaide in 1910 and played with them until 1919. He joined St Kilda in 1920 and the following year, also Charlie Ricketts retired mid-season, was appointed club captain. It would be his only season as captain of St Kilda. He returned to North Adelaide in 1926 but was comeback was brief.

== Adelaide Oval's curator ==
In 1939, following the death of Adelaide Oval curator Albert Wright, Williams was appointed as his replacement. He had been previously working as a greenkeeper at a bowling club, which was attached to the oval.

In 1947 Williams gave some hints on the preparation of a turf wicket.

In 1948 some souvenir hunters dug 15 to 20 holes into the oval at the end of the 4th test match. It was learned that the grass had not been re-laid since the late 1920s. Williams said some of the holes were 2 inches deep.

On 1 June 1953 Williams resigned due to ill health. He was given a cheque by the SA National Football League Chairman. Williams was succeeded by Arthur Lance.

== Personal life ==
On 25 May 1966, Williams died aged 74.

== Legacy ==
In 2024 during the Australia v. West Indies Test cricket match at the Adelaide Oval the SACA unveiled an honour board for the curators of the oval.
