= Les Burdett =

Australian cricket ground curator and oval manager

Les Burdett OAM
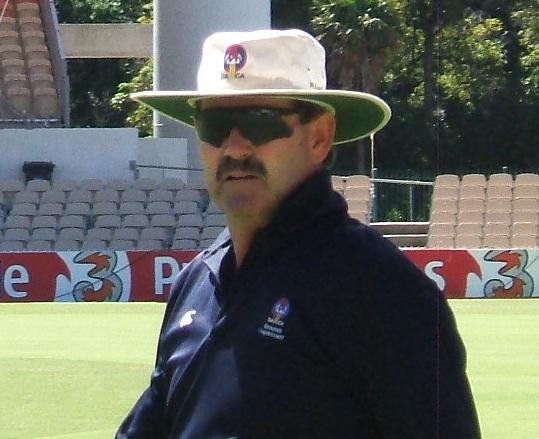
- Burdett at the Adelaide Oval
- Born: Les Underwood Burdett; 11 January 1951 (age 75); Adelaide, South Australia
- Occupation: Curator of the Adelaide Oval
- Years active: 1969–2010
- Awards: OAM (2008); Australian Sports Medal (2001); Centenary Medal (2003); Key to the City of Adelaide (2010)

Les Burdett served as the curator of the Adelaide Oval until 2010. He has also been hired to advise other international cricket grounds on the preparation of cricket pitches. He succeeded Arthur Lance and was succeeded by Damian Hough. He was the 9th Adelaide Oval Curator.

== Adelaide Oval's curator ==
Burdett joined South Australian Cricket Association in 1969 and he became curator in 1980 keeping that position until his retirement in February 2010.

In 2008, Burdett was awarded the Medal of the Order of Australia (OAM).

== Legacy ==
In 2024 during the Australia v. West Indies Test cricket match at the Adelaide Oval the SACA unveiled an honour board for the curators of the oval.
