= Arthur Hide =

English cricketer and Test match umpire

Arthur Bollard Hide (1860–1933) was an English first-class cricketer and Test match umpire.

Born in Eastbourne, England in 1860, Hide played 115 games for Sussex as a left arm medium pace bowler between 1882 and 1890. He took 403 wickets at 19.19 with a best of 7 for 44, taking five wickets in an innings on 20 occasions. Upon his playing retirement Hide turned to umpiring, standing in the 1899 Ashes Test at Old Trafford. He died in London in 1933.

Hide's brother Jesse also played first-class cricket.
