= Adelaide Oval =

Stadium in Adelaide, South Australia

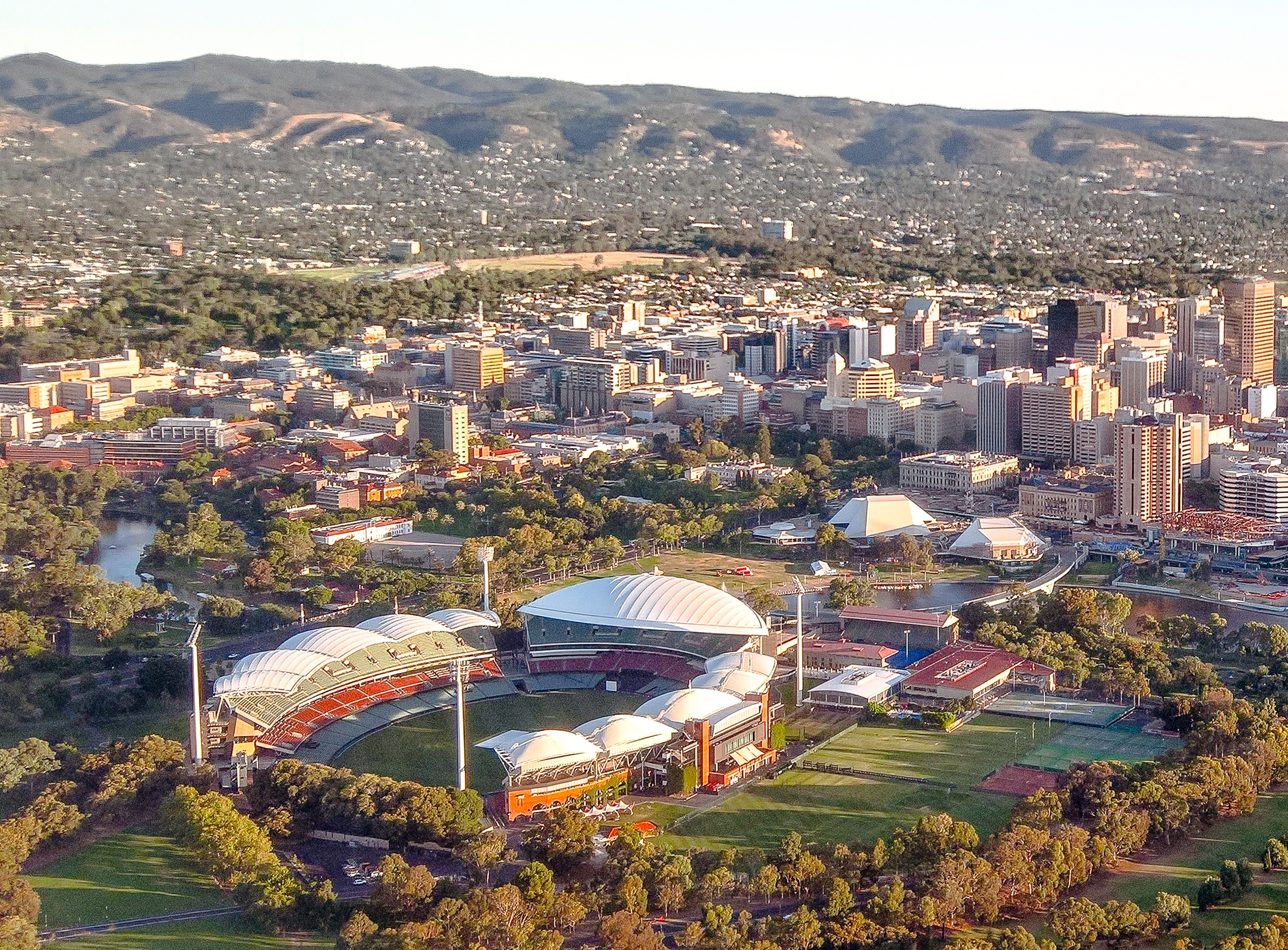
- The renovated Adelaide Oval in 2015
- Interactive map of Adelaide Oval
- Full name: Adelaide Oval
- Location: War Memorial Drive; North Adelaide, South Australia; Australia
- Coordinates: 34°54′56″S 138°35′46″E
- Owner: South Australian Government
- Operator: Adelaide Oval SMA Ltd
- Capacity: 53,500
- Surface: Grass
- Record attendance: 62,543 1965 SANFL Grand Final; Record Capacity; 72,000 (1927 Royal Visit)
- Field size: 167 m × 123 m (548 ft × 404 ft)
- Public transit: Adelaide; Festival Plaza

Construction
- Opened: 1872; 154 years ago

Tenants
- Cricket Australia (1884–present); South Australia (1874–present); Adelaide Strikers (2011–present) Australian rules football Adelaide (2014–present); Port Adelaide (1975–1976, 2011, 2014–present); South Adelaide (1882–1903, 1905–1994) Rugby league Adelaide Rams (1997–1998); Canterbury-Bankstown Bulldogs (2010–2011); Sydney Roosters (2017–2019); St. George Dragons (1991-1992, 1994-1995); Canberra Raiders (1993)

Website
- https://www.adelaideoval.com.au/

Ground information
- Country: Australia
- Establishment: 13 December 1873
- End names
- River End; Cathedral End

International information
- First men's Test: 12–16 December 1884: Australia v England
- Last men's Test: 17–21 December 2025: Australia v England
- First men's ODI: 20 December 1975: Australia v West Indies
- Last men's ODI: 8 November 2024: Australia v Pakistan
- First men's T20I: 12 January 2011: Australia v England
- Last men's T20I: 11 February 2024: Australia v West Indies
- First women's Test: 15–18 January 1949: Australia v England
- Last women's Test: 18–20 February 2006: Australia v India
- First women's ODI: 3 February 1996: Australia v New Zealand
- Last women's ODI: 3 February 2024: Australia v South Africa
- First women's T20I: 12 January 2011: Australia v England
- Last women's T20I: 25 January 2025: Australia v England
- As of 11 February 2024; Source: ESPN Cricinfo

Adelaide Oval is a stadium located within the Adelaide Park Lands in the suburb of North Adelaide. It is primarily used for Australian rules football and cricket as the home ground of the Adelaide Football Club and Port Adelaide Football Club in the Australian Football League (AFL), the Adelaide Strikers in the Big Bash League (BBL) and the South Australia cricket team in the Sheffield Shield. It is managed by the Adelaide Oval Stadium Management Authority.

Established in 1871, the structures and grounds underwent significant redevelopment between 2012 and 2014. It has three grandstands: Riverbank Stand, Eastern Stand, and Western Stand, and is known for its heritage-listed scoreboard, which stands alongside a new digital scoreboard. Australia's first stadium hotel, named the Oval Hotel, opened in 2024.

Adelaide Oval has been headquarters to the South Australian Cricket Association (SACA) since 1871 and regularly hosts finals matches in the South Australian National Football League (SANFL), including the grand final continuously since 2014. The highest-ever crowd at the venue was in 1965, when 62,543 people attended the SANFL Grand Final between Port Adelaide and Sturt.

== History ==
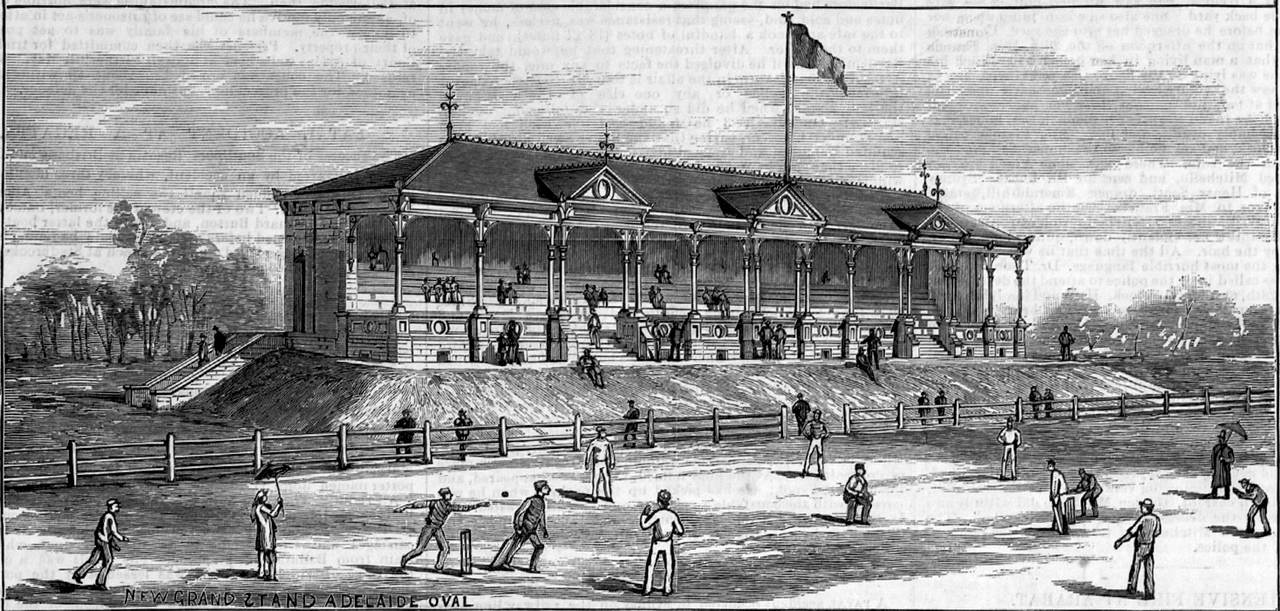
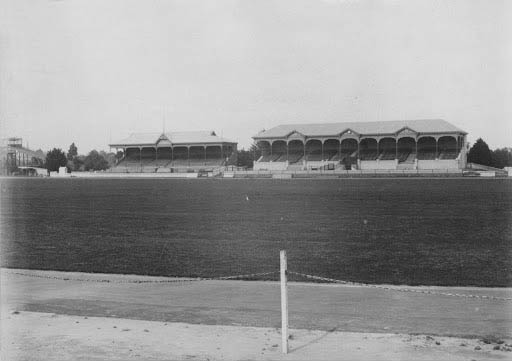
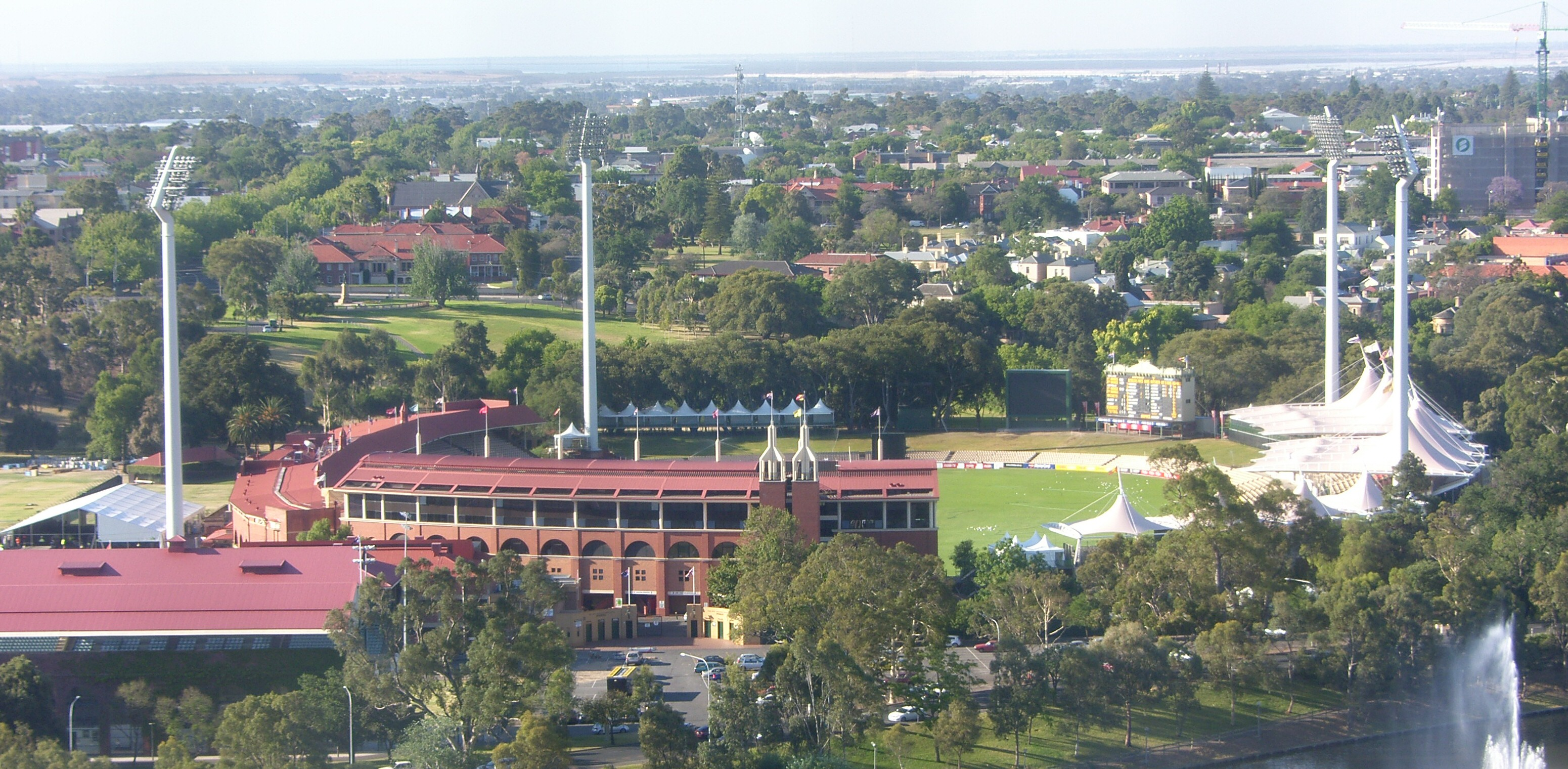
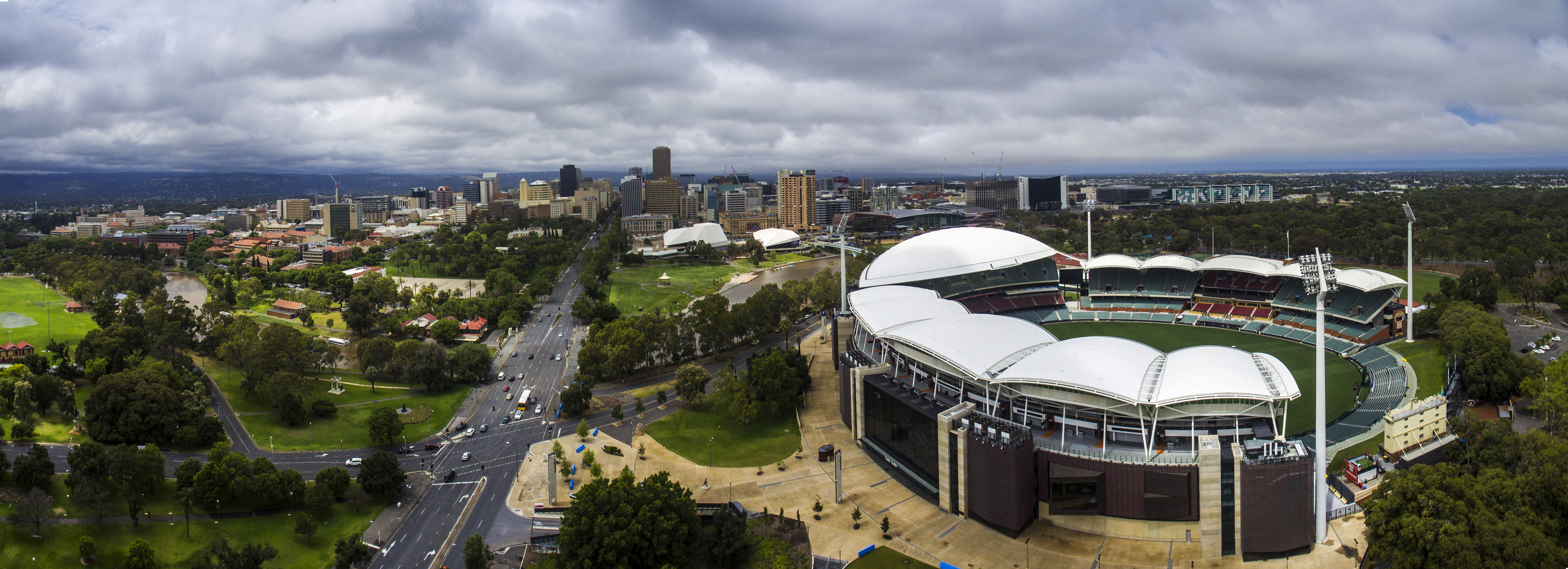
Top: First grandstand, built 1882, later renamed George Giffen Stand
Second: Adelaide Oval grandstands in 1889
Third: View of the Oval in 2006, prior to the 2012-2014 major redevelopment
Bottom: The Oval in 2016

=== 19th century ===
After the formation of the South Australian Cricket Association (SACA) on 31 May 1871, a later meeting recommended a central location for the cricket ground. After an act of parliament allowed a section of the Adelaide Park Lands between North Adelaide and the River Torrens to be leased by the association, the present grounds were leased in 1872 to the first trustees, Justice Gwynne, the Henry Ayers, and Edwin Thomas Smith.

Construction of the Cricket Ground was completed by 31 August 1872. The total space enclosed was 12 acres, of which the central half had been levelled, dug by hand labour, and planted with couch grass. This form the cricket ground proper and was at pains made perfectly level.

The Adelaide Oval was opened for cricket on Saturday 13 December 1873, with a cricket match between the Colonials (South Australian born) captained by John Pickering and the British (Overseas born) captained by Mr. Robinson. There was approximately 500 spectators present. The previous day 2,000 sheep were used to thin the top of the turf.

In 1882, a grandstand, possibly designed by Wright & Reed Architects, and later renamed the George Giffen Stand, was opened to the public. In 1884, the first Test match was played at the grounds, for which the mound was built and Moreton Bay fig trees were planted.

In 1885, the "Grand Corroboree", a corroboree performed by around 100 Aboriginal men and women from Point MacLeay mission and Yorke Peninsula, was attended by around 20,000 spectators (around a sixth of Adelaide's population).

During 1888, a switchback rollercoaster was constructed and was adjacent to Adelaide Oval, where the present Riverbank Stand resides.

In 1889 the original grandstand was expanded to include a dining saloon and "ladies retiring rooms", and a new stand, designed by English and Soward, was built adjacent to it.

=== 20th century ===
Ahead of a cycling event held on 24 March 1900, SACA undertook some major renovation of the grounds to accommodate a cycling track around the oval. Thousands of loads of earth were carted from the Torrens to create the necessary slope to the track, and a picket fence was built around the Oval's playing surface. A newspaper commenter wrote at the time: "The removal of the soil and the sloping of the banks of the lake [the Torrens] have greatly improved both its width and its appearance, while the banking up of the oval has rendered it impossible for anyone to see in from outside, for the mound is continued beyond the inner fence so as to form a natural grandstand for the spectators".

In 1911 the Adelaide Oval scoreboard, designed by architect F. Kenneth Milne, began service.

Between 1923 and 1929 substantial modifications and additions were built at the grounds, to designs by SACA architect Charles Walter Rutt. These included the John Creswell Stand (built 1923) and the entrance gates, and the western stands were integrated under one roof. At this time, the other stands were named Sir Edwin Smith Stand (built 1889), George Giffen Stand (built 1882) and Mostyn Evan Stand (built 1919–26).

In May 1927 Prince Albert, Duke of York and Elizabeth, Duchess of York visited the Adelaide Oval as a part of the Royal Tour. There was a school children's demonstration with 12 thousand children at the oval which has attended by 60 thousand. The royal party drove on the Adelaide Oval. In 1934 the Duke of Gloucester visited the Adelaide Oval.

In 1948 some souvenir hunters dug 15 to 20 holes into the Oval at the end of the 4th Test match. It was learned that the grass had not been re-laid since the late 1920s. The curator said some of the holes were 2 inches deep.

On 25 August 1973, during an SANFL game between Norwood and North Adelaide, two young children, Joanne Ratcliffe (born 1962) and Kirste Gordon (born 1968), went missing, presumably abducted, in a crime sometimes referred to as the Adelaide Oval abductions.

On 20 January 1990 the Sir Donald Bradman Stand was opened, after being built to replace the John Creswell stand.

In 1997 lights were constructed at the ground allowing sport to be held at night. This was the subject of a lengthy dispute with the Adelaide City Council relating to the parklands area. The first towers erected were designed to retract into the ground; however one collapsed and they were replaced with permanent towers.

=== 21st century ===
In 2003 two grandstands, named the Chappell Stands, after the South Australian cricketing brothers Ian Chappell, Greg Chappell, and Trevor Chappell, were completed.

Temporary stands were constructed for the 2006 Ashes Series to cope with demand. In August 2008 SACA announced that it had approved plans to redevelop the ground, involving expanding its capacity to 40,000. Development plans showed a reconfiguration of the playing surface and a remodelled Western stand. The redevelopment would make the ground a viable option for hosting Australian Football League games as well as international soccer and rugby. The state and federal Governments each pledged $25m to the project, leaving the SACA to raise at least $45m. The SACA planned for the new stand to be ready in time for the 2010–11 Ashes series. The South Australian government announced it would commit funding to redevelop Adelaide Oval into a multi-purpose sports facility that would bring AFL football to central Adelaide. Announcing an agreement negotiated with SACA, SANFL and the AFL, the Rann Labor government committed $450 million to the project.

2010: New Western Stand

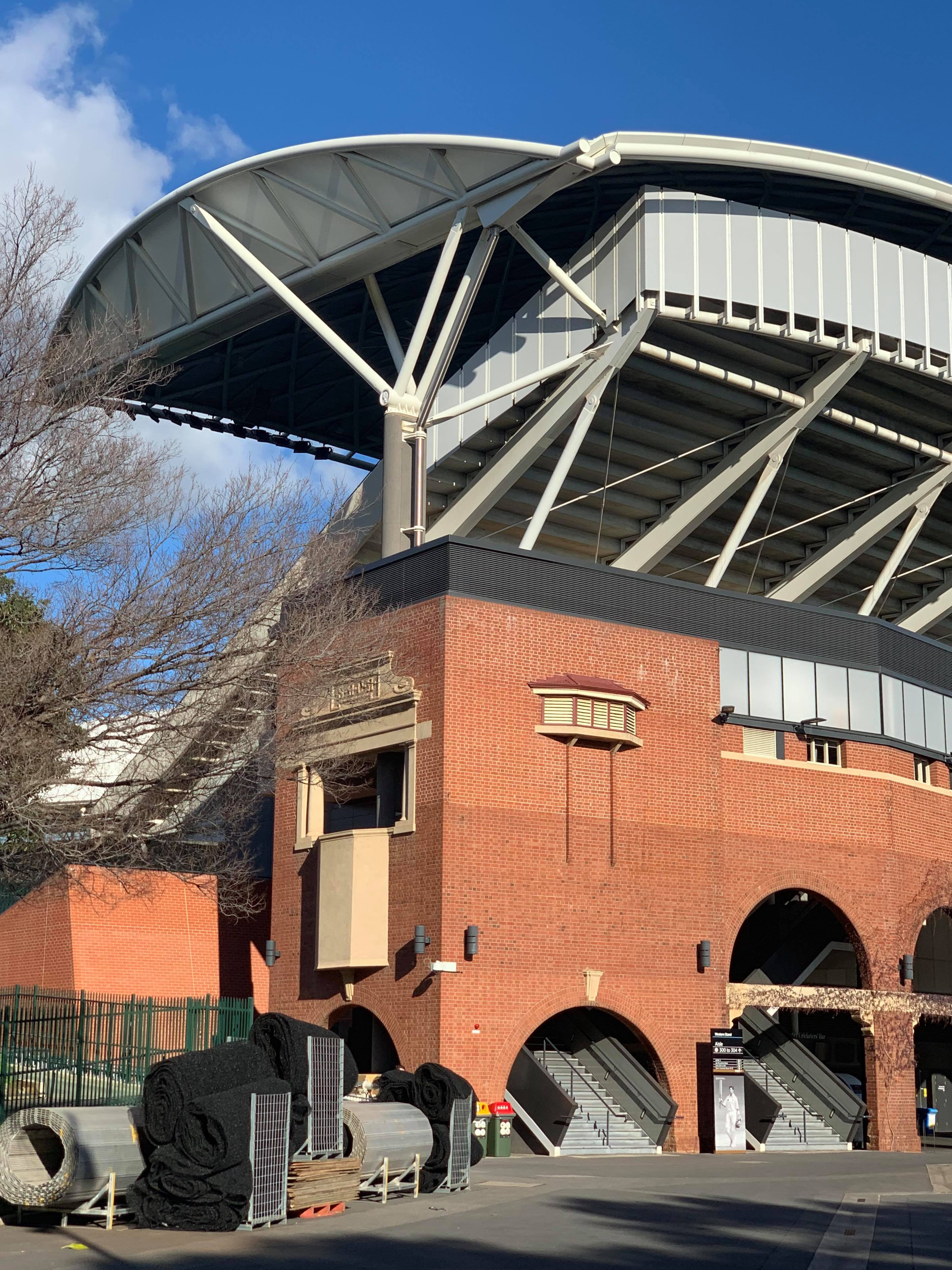
Adelaide Oval's Western Stand was redeveloped in 2010, retaining significant portions of the George Giffen stand (1882), Sir Edwin Smith stand (1922) and Mostyn Evan stand (1920s) structural facades.

The three original western stands were demolished (George Giffen stand (1882), Sir Edwin Smith stand (1922), Mostyn Evan stand (1920s)) were torn down in June 2009 and a single Western Stand was developed in its place ahead of the 2010–11 Ashes series.

The Adelaide Oval Stadium Management Authority (AOSMA), a joint venture of SACA and the South Australian National Football League (SANFL), was registered as a company on 23 December 2009 following the re-announcement of the plan. In 2010 AOSMA had eight directors, four associated with SACA (Ian McLachlan, chair; John Harnden; Creagh O'Connor; and John Bannon), and four with SANFL (Leigh Whicker-CEO, Rod Payze, Philip Gallagher & Jamie Coppins).

In 2010 the new Western Stand was completed, incorporating 14,000 individual seats and featuring improved shading conditions and amenities for SACA members.

==== 2012–2014 redevelopment ====
In the lead-up to the 2010 state election, the opposition SA Liberals announced that, if elected, it would build a new stadium with a roof, located at Riverside West at the site of the state government's new hospital location. The incumbent SA Labor government subsequently announced it would fund a $450 million upgrade and redevelopment of the whole of Adelaide Oval, rather than just the Western Grand Stand.

However, in early-mid-2010, prior to the election, it became clear that $450m would be inadequate. Following the election, won by Labor, the Rann government capped the State Government's commitment at $450 million, and set a deadline for the parties to agree. In May, treasurer Kevin Foley announced that "the government's final offer to the SANFL and SACA for the redevelopment" was $535 million, and the deadline was extended to August 2010. Simultaneously, SACA and the SANFL were in the process of negotiating an agreement that would enable Australian rules football to use Adelaide Oval during the AFL season as their home ground. In August 2010, SANFL and SACA representatives signed letters of intent committing to the project, including the capped $535 million offer from the state government.

The redevelopment included a $40 million pedestrian bridge across the River Torrens to link the Adelaide railway station precinct with the Adelaide Oval precinct, which was partially completed for the Ashes cricket series in December 2013 and fully completed ahead of the 2014 AFL season.

In early 2011, the AFL, SANFL, SACA, the SA Government and the Australian Government reached an agreement to upgrade Adelaide Oval. The SACA and the SANFL proposed, if SACA members vote yes on the upgrade in early May, that the whole Stadium would undergo redevelopment, except for the Northern Mound, the Moreton Bay fig trees and the heritage-listed scoreboard. A three-quarters majority of SACA members were required to vote in favour of the proposed upgrade for it to ahead, with a successful vote resulting in the SANFL and AFL having control over the stadium for 7 months of the year and SACA having control for 5 months of the year. SACA members had the choice of voting online on 28 April 2011 or attending in person an Extraordinary Meeting at the Adelaide Showground on 2 May 2011. At 6 pm, 28 April 2011, It was announced that 60% of SACA members that voted online voted yes, 15% short of the majority vote needed for the upgrade to go ahead. At 10.15 pm, on 2 May 2011, the final result was announced: 80.37% of total votes cast were in favour of Adelaide Oval being redeveloped (10,078 members voted yes and 2,461 voted no), meaning that the 75% threshold had been reached and the upgrade and stadium reconfiguration was approved. Following the vote, the South Australian Government increased its funding commitment to $535 million.

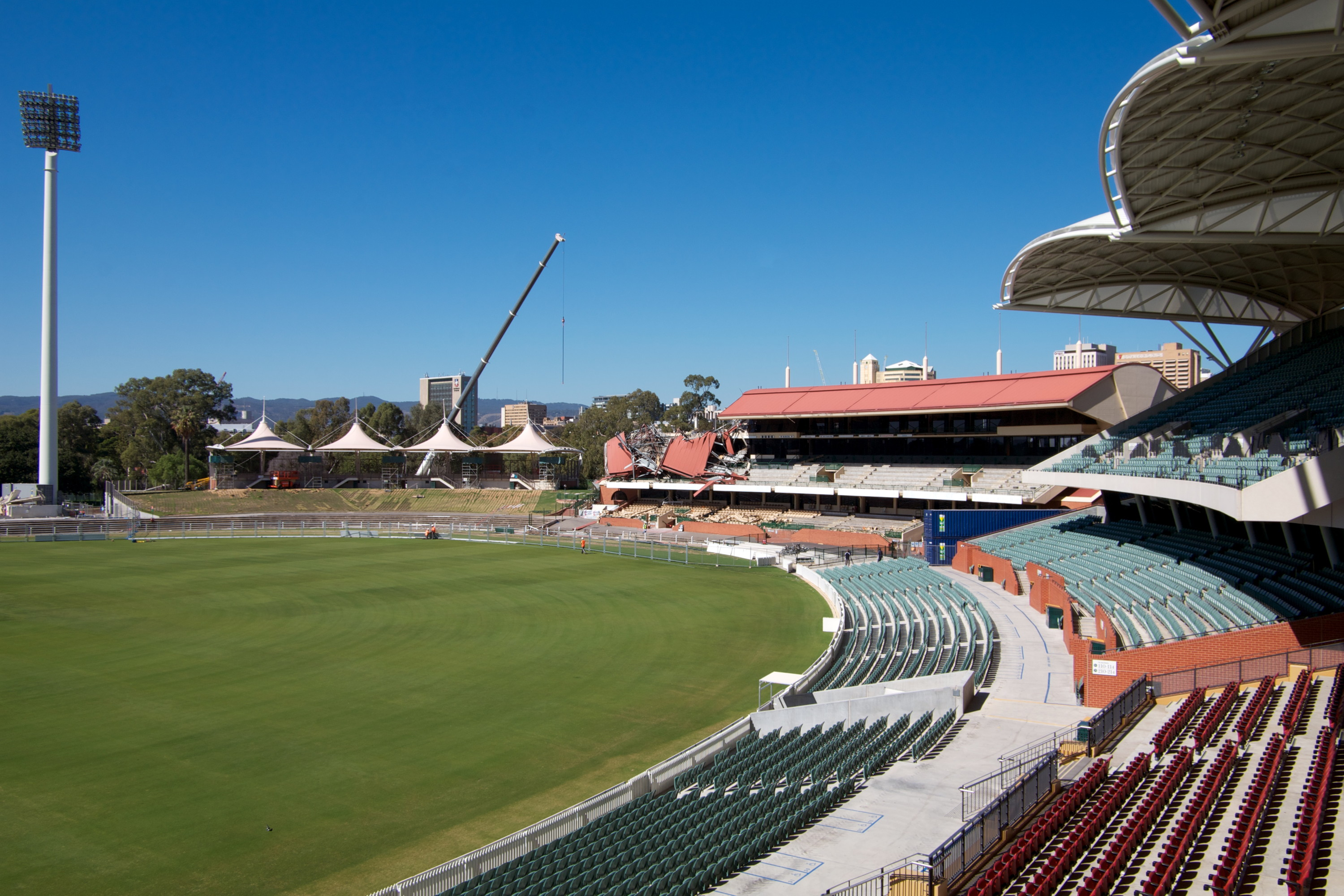
Demolition (April 2012)

The upgrade commenced in April 2012. The Chappell Stands and Sir Donald Bradman Stand were demolished. The Riverbank Stand was complete in late 2013 in time for the Ashes test as well as parts of level one of the Eastern Stand. The new Eastern Stand was fully completed with a total capacity of 19,000, bringing the overall seating capacity of the stadium to 50,083 in time for the 2014 AFL season.

As part of the 2012-14 redevelopment, the already rebuilt Western Grandstand (SACA and SANFL members-only stand) had modifications to improve sightlines for some seats, the addition of a new media centre for AFL, Rugby League, Rugby Union and Soccer matches and AFL standard interchange benches. The Northern Mound had its seating capacity increased, and the historic scoreboard and the Moreton Bay fig trees, planted in the 1890s, remained untouched. The 2014 development included renaming the central part of the Western stand the Sir Donald Bradman Pavilion.

The lights under the roof of the grandstands were replaced with LEDs in November 2017, followed by the light towers in December 2023 with the latter costing $5 million. Australia's first stadium-hotel, the Oval Hotel, was announced in December 2018 and opened in September 2020. It has 138 guest rooms. In 2024 during the Australia v. West Indies Test cricket match at the Adelaide Oval the SACA unveiled an honour board for the curators of the oval.

== Description and features ==
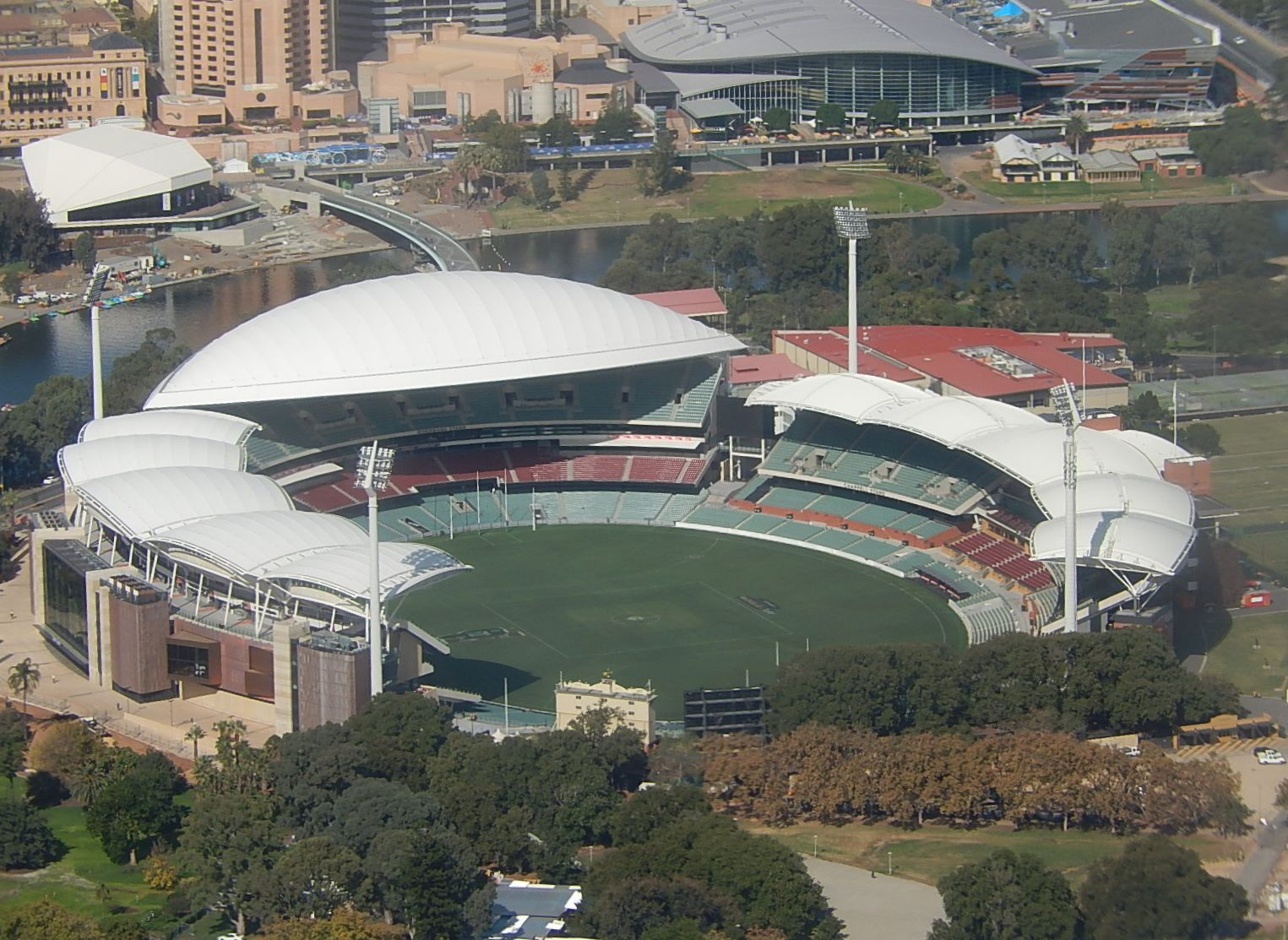
Adelaide Oval in 2014

The venue is predominantly used for cricket and Australian rules football, but has also played host to rugby league, rugby union, soccer, and tennis, as well as regularly being used to hold concerts.

In 2012 Austadiums.com described Adelaide Oval as being "one of the most picturesque Test cricket grounds in Australia, if not the world." After the completion of the ground's redevelopment in 2014, sports journalist Gerard Whateley described the venue as being "the most perfect piece of modern architecture because it's a thoroughly contemporary stadium with all the character that it's had in the past".

Volunteers lead 90-minute guided walking tours of the grounds for interested visitors, including children.

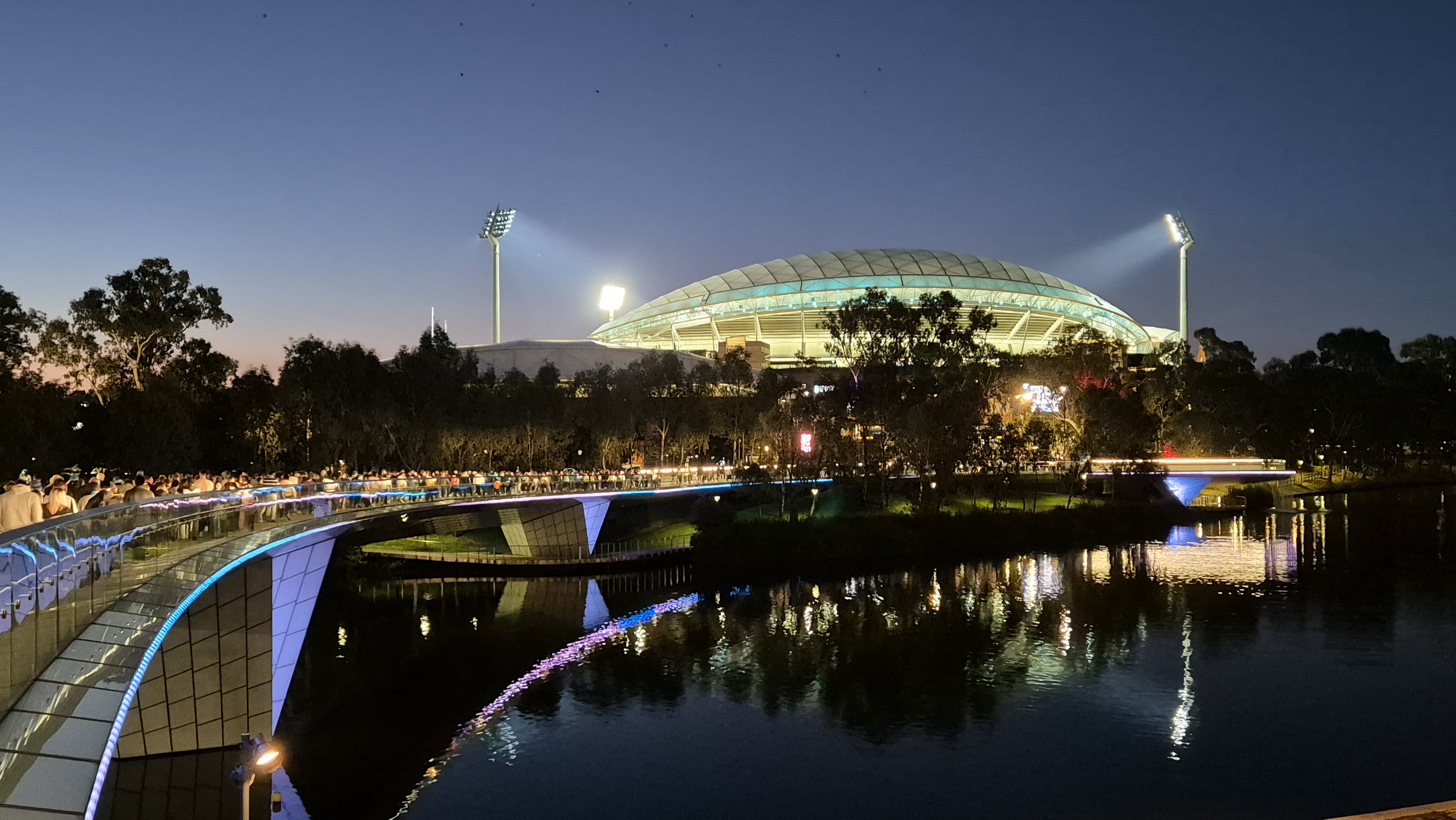
Night time view of the Adelaide Oval from the Riverbank Pedestrian Bridge, April 2024

=== Oval and pitch ===
The oval is 190 m (620 ft) by 125 m (410 ft). This is both unusually long and narrow for an Australian cricket or football ground. The arrangement was highly favourable for batsmen who played square of the wicket, and heavily penalised bowlers who delivered the ball short or wide so that the batsman could play cut, hook or pull shots. Before the far ends in front of and behind the wicket were roped off, making the playing area shorter, it was not uncommon for batsmen to hit an all-run four or even occasionally a five.

The Adelaide Oval pitch runs north–south. Historically, Adelaide Oval's integral pitch was generally very good for batting, and offering little assistance to bowlers until the last day of a match. Since the redevelopment in 2013, a drop-in pitch has been used at the venue.

=== Scoreboard ===
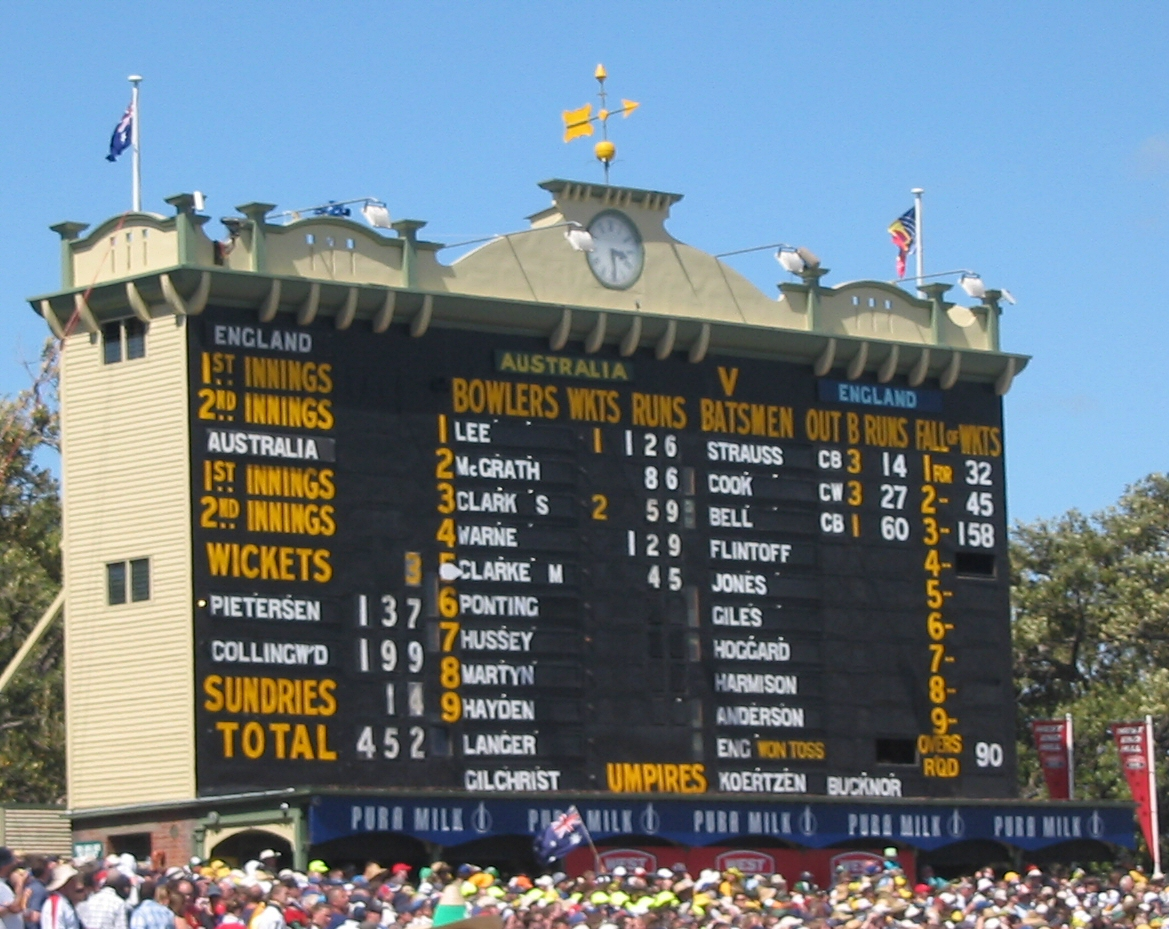
The Adelaide Oval scoreboard during an Ashes Test

The heritage-listed scoreboard, designed by architect F. Kenneth Milne and located on "The Hill", was first used in 1911, and has been retained. Today there is a manually operated display adjacent to a huge digital one, around four storeys high. The scoreboard, which was first heritage-listed by the National Trust in 1984, was listed on the South Australian Heritage Register in 1986. This is the only manual scoreboard still operating in major Australasian cricket venues. Due to the 10-letter limit, some names have to be truncated, or be replaced by nicknames.

=== The Northern Mound ===
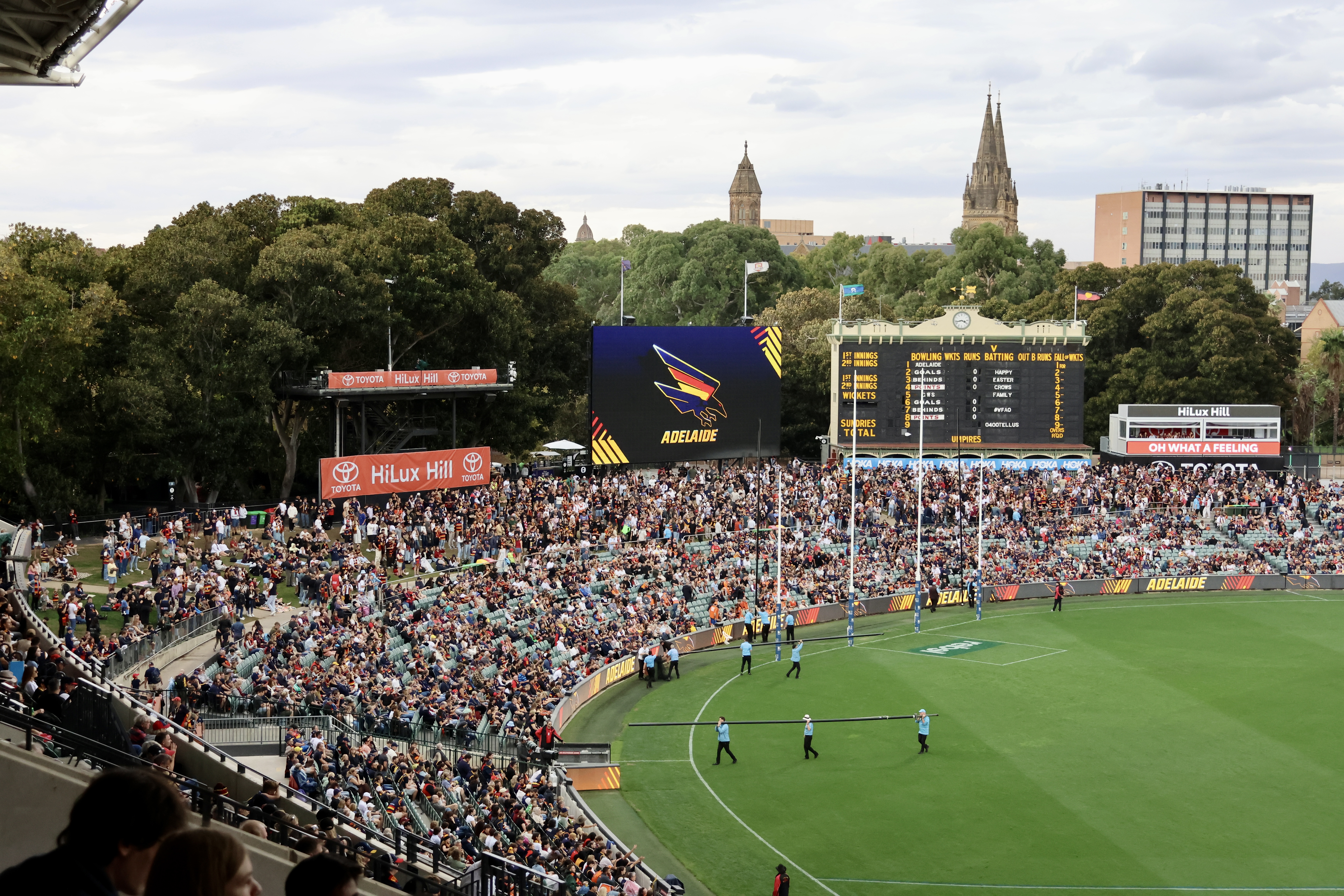
The Hill occupied by Adelaide Crows supporters in 2025

'"Northern Mound" (or "The Hill"), located under the scoreboard and shaded by the Moreton Bay fig trees, was created in 1898 or 1900, with earth from the banks of the River Torrens. It became a favoured spot for some of the most vocal supporters in the crowd, and was known for being very noisy before the 2014 redevelopment.

Since then, seating has been installed on part of the hill, and only around 3,500 spectators can be accommodated on the strip of grass in front of the scoreboard, a fraction of the crowd that used to gather there. As of 2024 The Hill includes the Northern Mound Terrace, a hospitality venue set on large timber decking.

=== Bradshaw Bell ===
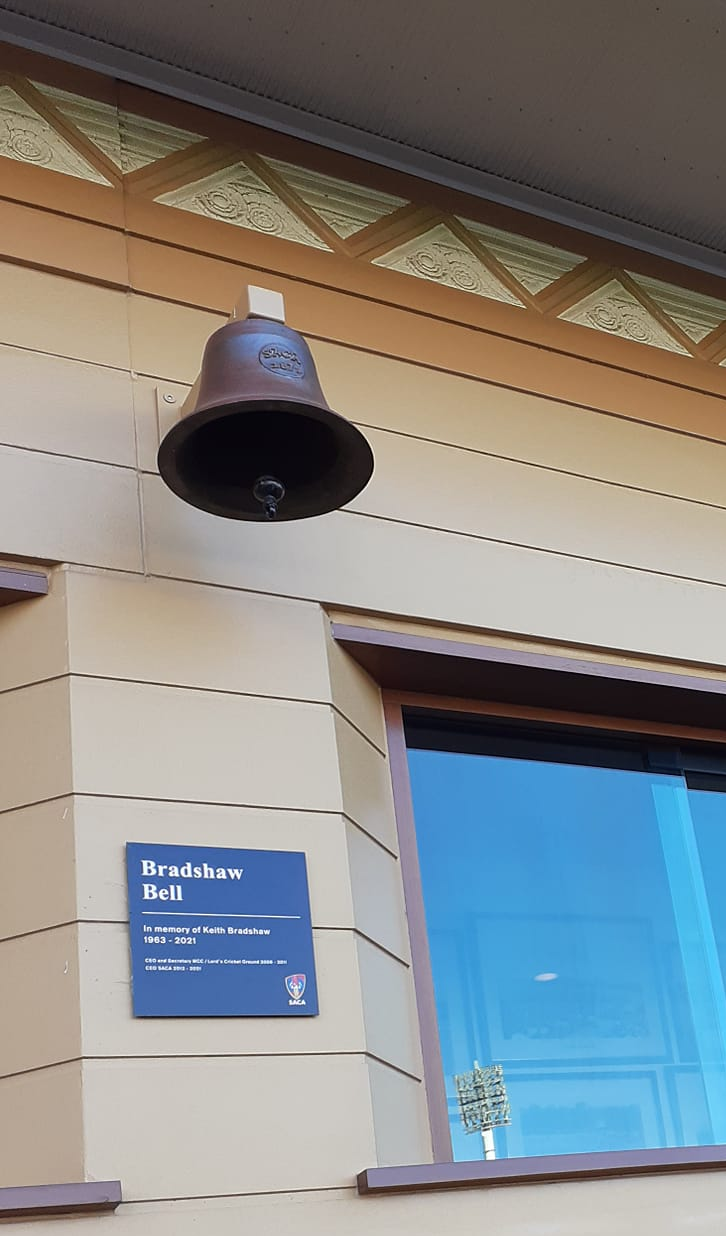
The Bradshaw Bell

Since 2021 Bradshaw Bell, named after former SACA CEO Keith Bradshaw after his death, is rung at the start of each day's play in a Test match. Weighing 64 kg (141 lb), the bell was designed by Australian Bell and local digital engineering company Applidyne, and forged at Billmans Foundry in Castlemaine, Victoria.

=== Members' stands ===
The members' stands were the first section of the ground completed in the 2014 redevelopment of Adelaide Oval. They retain significant portions of the original members' stands, including the brick archways and long room.

As of 2024 Adelaide Oval has three grandstands: Riverbank Stand, Eastern Stand, and Western Stand.

The Riverbank Stand is the southern stand of Adelaide Oval, gaining its name from the River Torrens which is behind it. It has a capacity of 14,000 spectators.

The Eastern Stand holds 19,000 spectators. The five segments are named after South Australian Australian rules football identities: from north to south named Gavin Wanganeen Stand, Jack Oatey Stand, Max Basheer Stand, Fos Williams Stand, and Mark Ricciuto Stand.

=== Victor Richardson Gates ===
The Victor Richardson Gates, at the south-eastern entrance of the oval off King William Road, were locally heritage-listed as of city significance in 2001. Architect and then mayor James Campbell Irwin suggested the idea of honouring Richardson in 1965, and a public appeal supported by SACA and SANFL raised funds for the gates. In 1966, the small road leading to the Oval from King William Road was named Victor Richardson Drive. The five iron gates, set between rectangular arches, were erected in 1967, in honour of cricketer and footballer Victor Richardson (1894–1969). Former footballer Ian Hannaford was supervising architect, and reliefs created by South Australian sculptor John Dowie were added after over £5000 was raised. The gates include two double-sided bronze reliefs, showing groups of football players competing for the ball and cricketers batting, bowling, and fielding, with the batsman resembling Richardson. Lord Mayor Walter Bridgland led the opening ceremony on 28 October 1967, with Alderman Irwin opening the gates. Sir Donald Bradman and Don Brebner, then SANFL president, attended the ceremony, which was held during a Sheffield Shield lunch break. Players Ian and Greg Chappell, Richardson's grandsons, helped to form the guard of honour. A central bronze plaque was installed after the death of Richardson in 1969.

In 2003, when the Chappell Stands were built, the gates were moved slightly northwards, and precast concrete pillars and a capping beam replaced the original metal framework. After the stands were demolished in April 2012, the Victor Richardson Gates were repositioned in March 2014.

== Cricket ==
=== International cricket ===
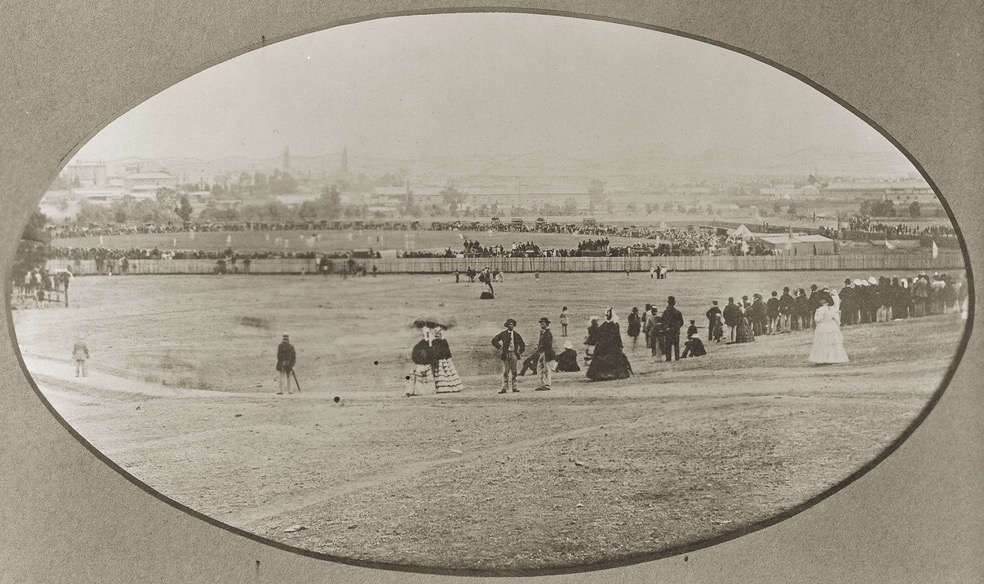
In 1874 a side representing England led by W.G. Grace defeated a South Australian side by 7 wickets in what was the first international cricket match at the ground

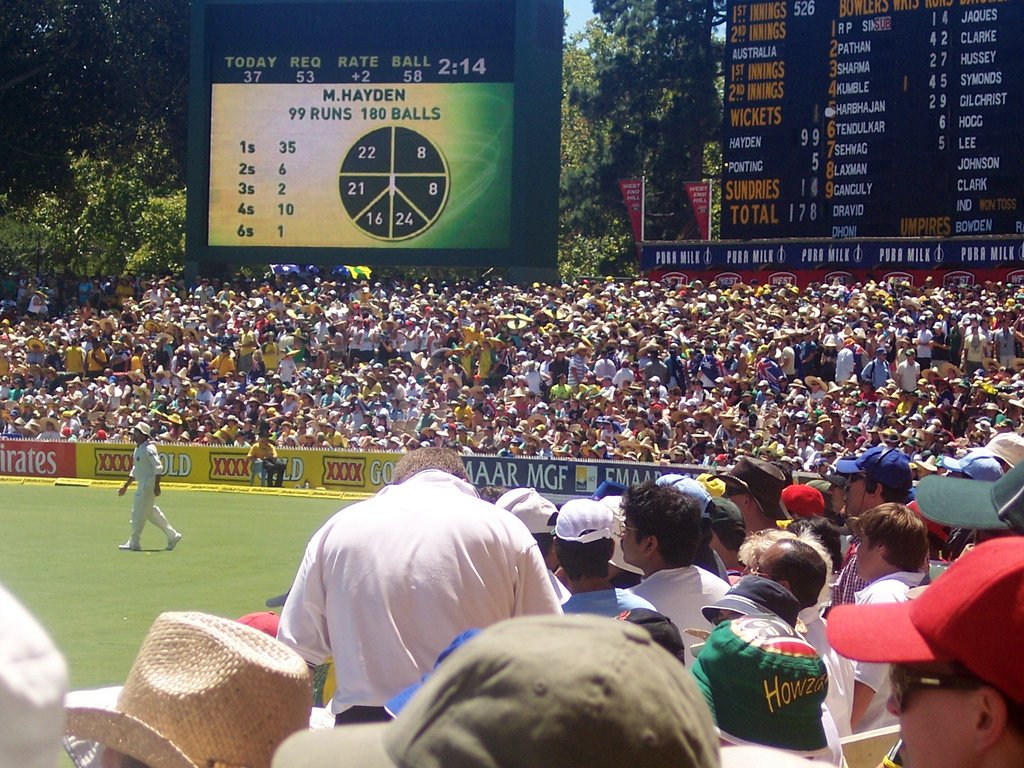
Adelaide Oval during the 2008 Test series between Australia and India. Sachin Tendulkar can be seen fielding in the left of the image.

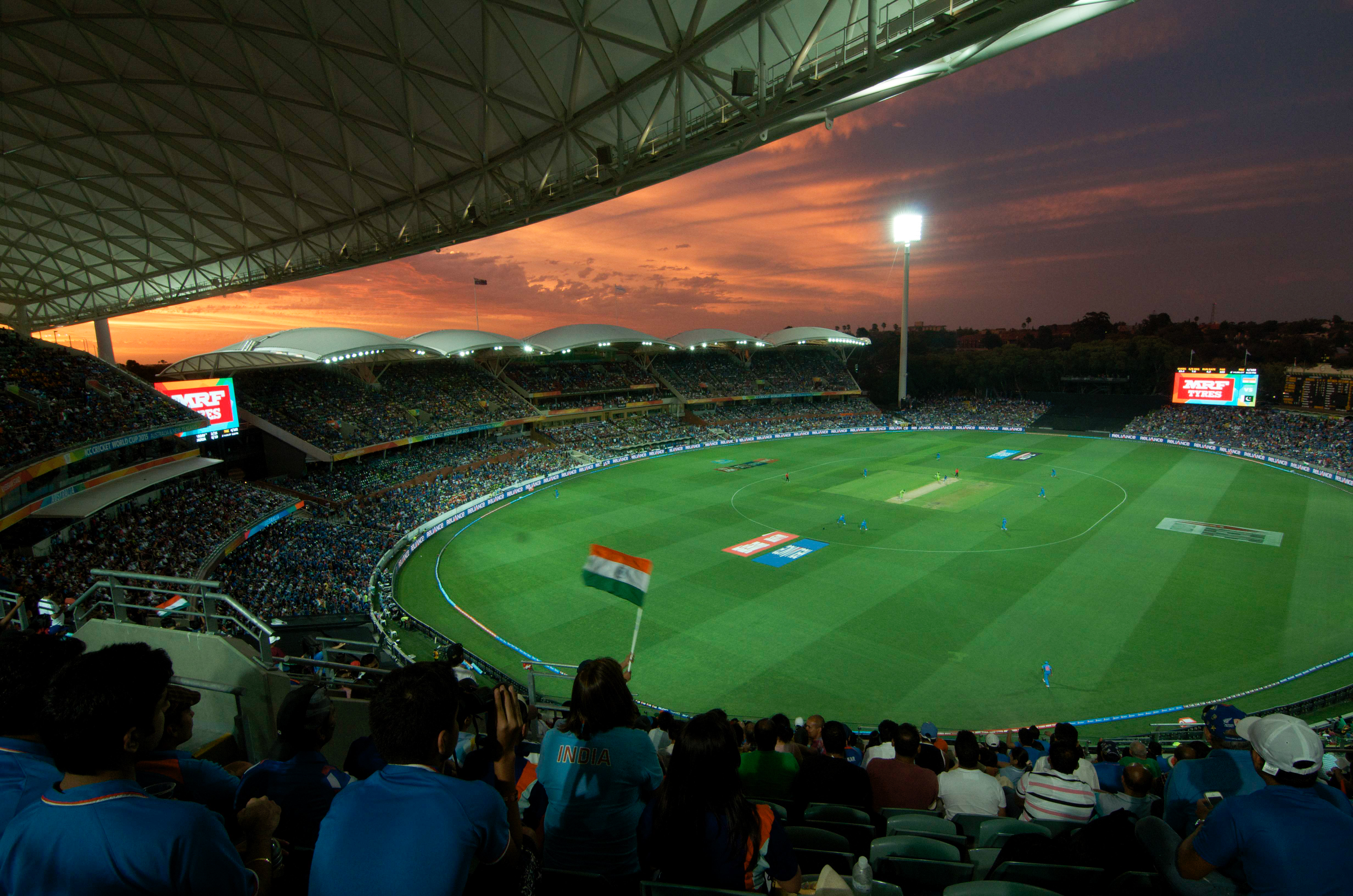
Adelaide Oval during a day–night match for the 2015 Cricket World Cup

Adelaide Oval hosts some of the many events in the cricketing calendar, including the annual Australia Day One Day International on 26 January (replacing a traditional Australia Day Test) and every four years, one of the five Ashes Test matches against England. The Tests are now normally held in early December and is a clash between Australia and the international touring team of that particular season. Adelaide Oval was the host of the first ever day/night Test match, when Australia played New Zealand on 27 November 2015.

In 2011, Adelaide Oval held its first Twenty20 International between Australia and England, a match which England won by one wicket. The ground was announced as one of the venues for the 2022 ICC Men's T20 World Cup, and hosted one of the semi-finals.

=== Domestic cricket ===
Adelaide Oval is the home ground for the first-class South Australian state cricket team, The West End Southern Redbacks and Twenty20 cricket team, the Adelaide Strikers. The Strikers compete in the Big Bash League. The Southern Redbacks compete in the Sheffield Shield and JLT One Day Cup.

=== Cricket timeline ===
- 1873 - 13 December – The first cricket game is played on the ground between Australian born players and players born overseas.
- 1874 - 1 March – England beat South Australia by 7 wickets in the first international cricket match at the ground.
- 1874 - 7 November – South Australia play Victoria on Adelaide Oval for the first time. Victoria won by 15 runs.
- 1877 - 10 November – The first first-class cricket match played at the ground was between South Australia and Tasmania. South Australia was victorious, winning by an innings and 13 runs.
- 1878 - 30 January – The first cricket century at the ground was scored by John Hill, 102 not out for North Adelaide against the Kent Club.
- 1884 - 12 December – The first Test match was played at the Oval. England beat Australia by eight wickets. (Scorecard)
- 1894 - 15 January – Albert Trott collected 8/43 on debut against England, the grounds best single-innings Test match bowling figure.
- 1931 – Donald Bradman scored the highest Test score at the ground, 299 not out, against South Africa. Clarrie Grimmett collected the most Test wickets in a match at the ground, fourteen, against South Africa.
- 1932 – The Bodyline affair reached its lowest point at the ground when Bill Woodfull and Bert Oldfield were struck, and on the third day mounted police patrolled to keep the 50,962 spectators in order (a record crowd for cricket at the ground). The total attendance for the match was 174,351.
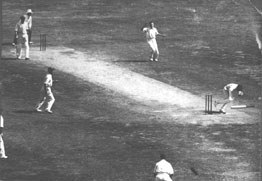
  During the third test of the 1932–33 Ashes series Bert Oldfield was struck in the head by a ball from Harold Larwood. This series became known as the Bodyline due to the controversial aggressive tactics of the English.
- 1946 – Arthur Morris of Australia, and Denis Compton of England both made centuries in both innings of the Test.
- 1947 – Australia scored the highest team total in a test match at the ground, 674 runs, against India.
- 1949 - 15 January – The first women's test match held at the ground was between England and Australia. Australia would win by 186 runs.
- 1960 – Australia played the West Indies in the fourth test of the Frank Worrell Trophy. The match ended in a draw, with the West Indies unable to take the final wicket of the fourth innings, as the last batsmen Ken Mackay and Lindsay Kline held out for 109 minutes. West Indies bowler Lance Gibbs took the only Test cricket hat-trick at the ground in Australia's first innings. (Scorecard)
- 1975 – The first One-Day International match at the ground was between Australia and the West Indies. Australia won by 5 wickets. (Scorecard)
- 1982 – In a Sheffield Shield game against Victoria, David Hookes hit a 43-minute, 34 ball century – by some metrics the fastest hundred in history. (Statistics)
- 1991 – South Australia compiled the highest fourth innings winning total in Sheffield Shield history, reaching 6/506 (set 506 to win) against Queensland.
- 1992 – The West Indies defeated Australia by one run in the fourth test of the Frank Worrell Trophy, when a bouncer by Courtney Walsh brushed Craig McDermott's glove to end a 40-run last-wicket partnership. It was the narrowest victory ever in Test cricket. (Scorecard)
- 1997 – The first cricket match under lights was a One Day International between South Africa and New Zealand on 6 December 1997. (Scorecard)
- 1999 – Sri Lankan spinner Muttiah Muralitharan was called for throwing by umpire Ross Emerson in a One Day International against England. The Sri Lankan team almost abandoned the match, but after instructions from the president of the Sri Lankan cricket board (relayed to captain Arjuna Ranatunga by mobile phone) the game resumed.
- 2006 – During the Ashes series, many temporary stands were erected to cope with the demand for tickets. Stands were put between the Chappell stands and on the top of the hills. Australia beat England by 6 wickets on a remarkable last day. (Scorecard)
- 2014 - 10 December – Michael Clarke scored his 7th century on the ground, the most test cricket centuries at the ground.
- 2015 - 27 November – Adelaide Oval hosted the first ever day/night Test match, when Australia played New Zealand.
- 2017 - 2 December – Adelaide Oval hosted the first day/night Ashes Test, attended by a record crowd for cricket of 55,317.
- 2018 - 4 February – Adelaide Oval hosted its first Big Bash League Grand Final with the Adelaide Strikers defeating the Hobart Hurricanes for the Championship.
- 2019 - 30 November - David Warner breaks the record for most runs scored in a single test innings by an individual player at Adelaide Oval with a score of 335* against Pakistan, surpassing Donald Bradman's 299* in 1932.
- 2020 - 19 December – India were all out for 36 on the third day of a test match against Australia in the second innings. This is India's lowest ever test score and the lowest ever test score recorded at the Adelaide Oval.
- 2025 - 17–21 December - A new Cricket record attendance at Adelaide Oval saw 56,298 attend day 1 of the Ashes and a record crowd of 223,638 over 5 days saw Australia retain the Ashes on a dramatic last day.

== Australian rules football ==
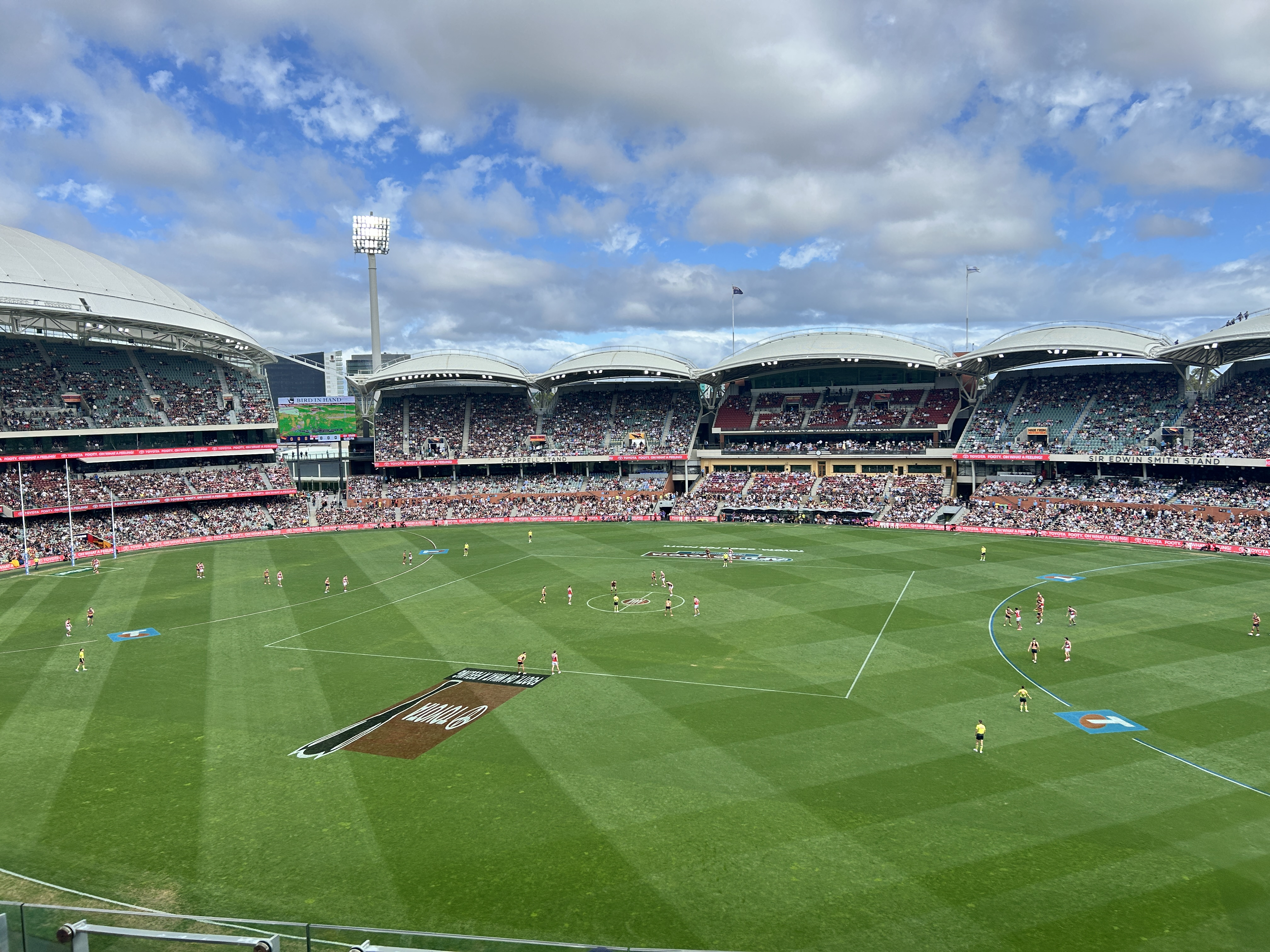
Adelaide and St Kilda players assembled in their starting positions ahead of the opening match of the 2025 AFL season at Adelaide Oval.

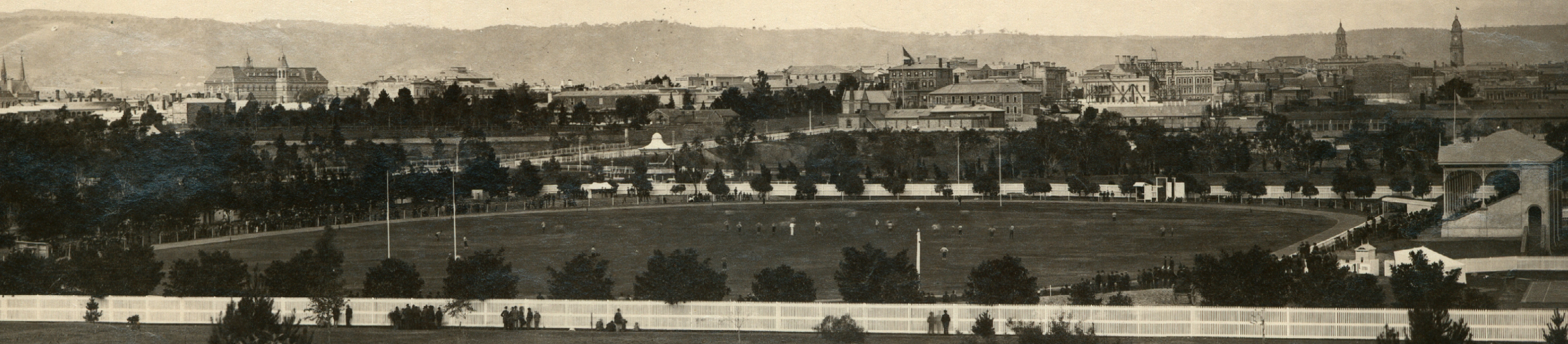
View of an Australian rules football match on Adelaide Oval from Montefiore Hill during the 1887 SAFA season. Note the lack of behind posts.

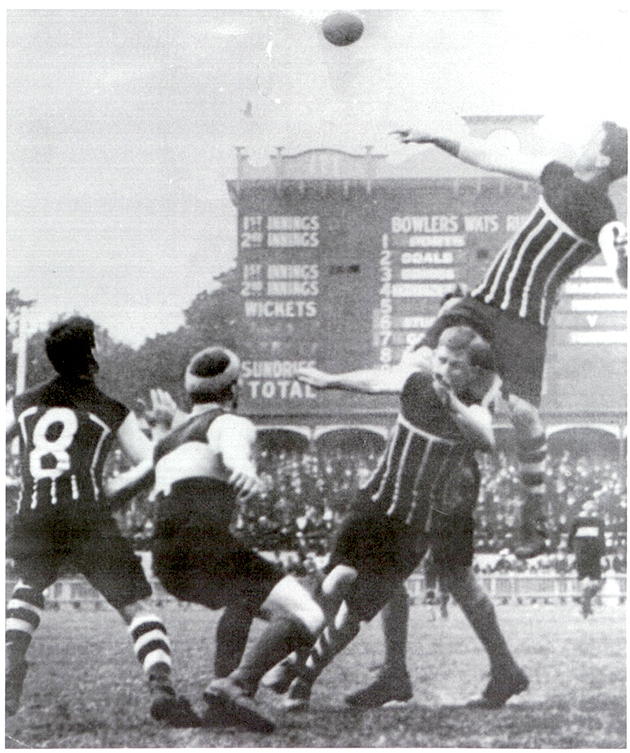
Harold Oliver taking a spectacular mark during the 1914 SAFL Semi-final.

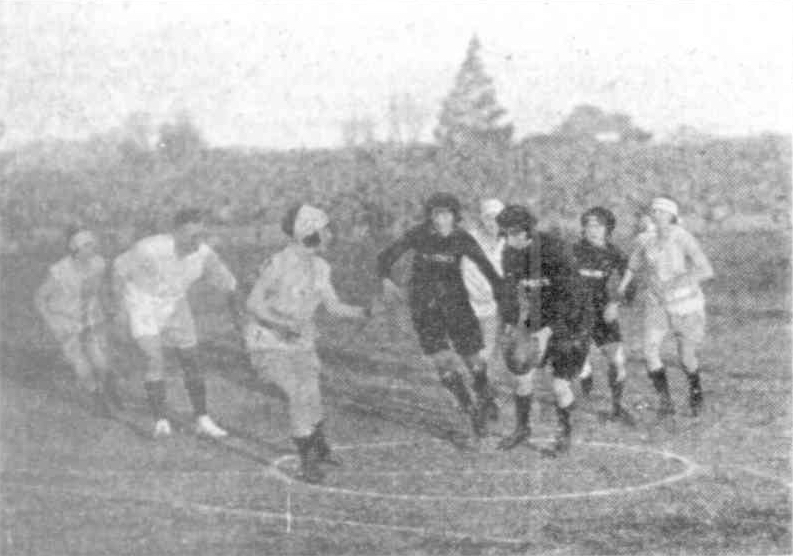
1929 women's Australian rules football match, witnessed by 41,000 spectators.

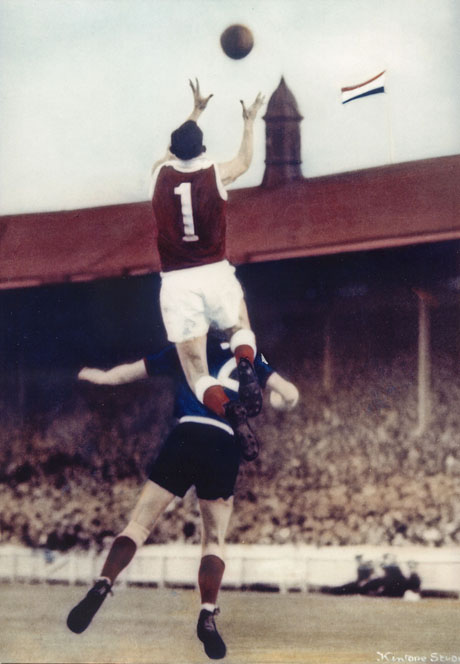
Ian McKay taking a spectacular mark during the 1952 SANFL Grand Final.

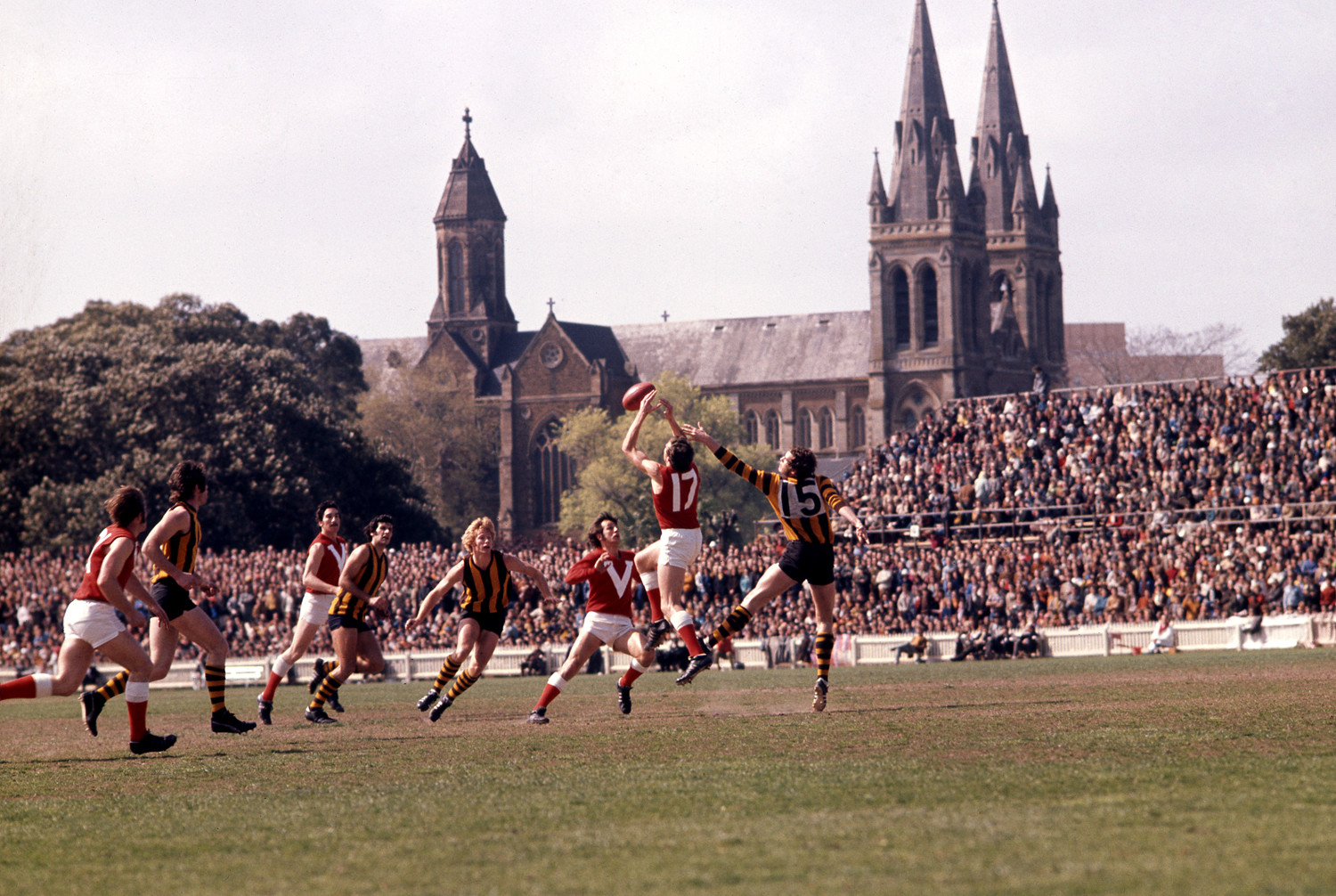
North Adelaide playing Hawthorn for the 1971 Championship of Australia.

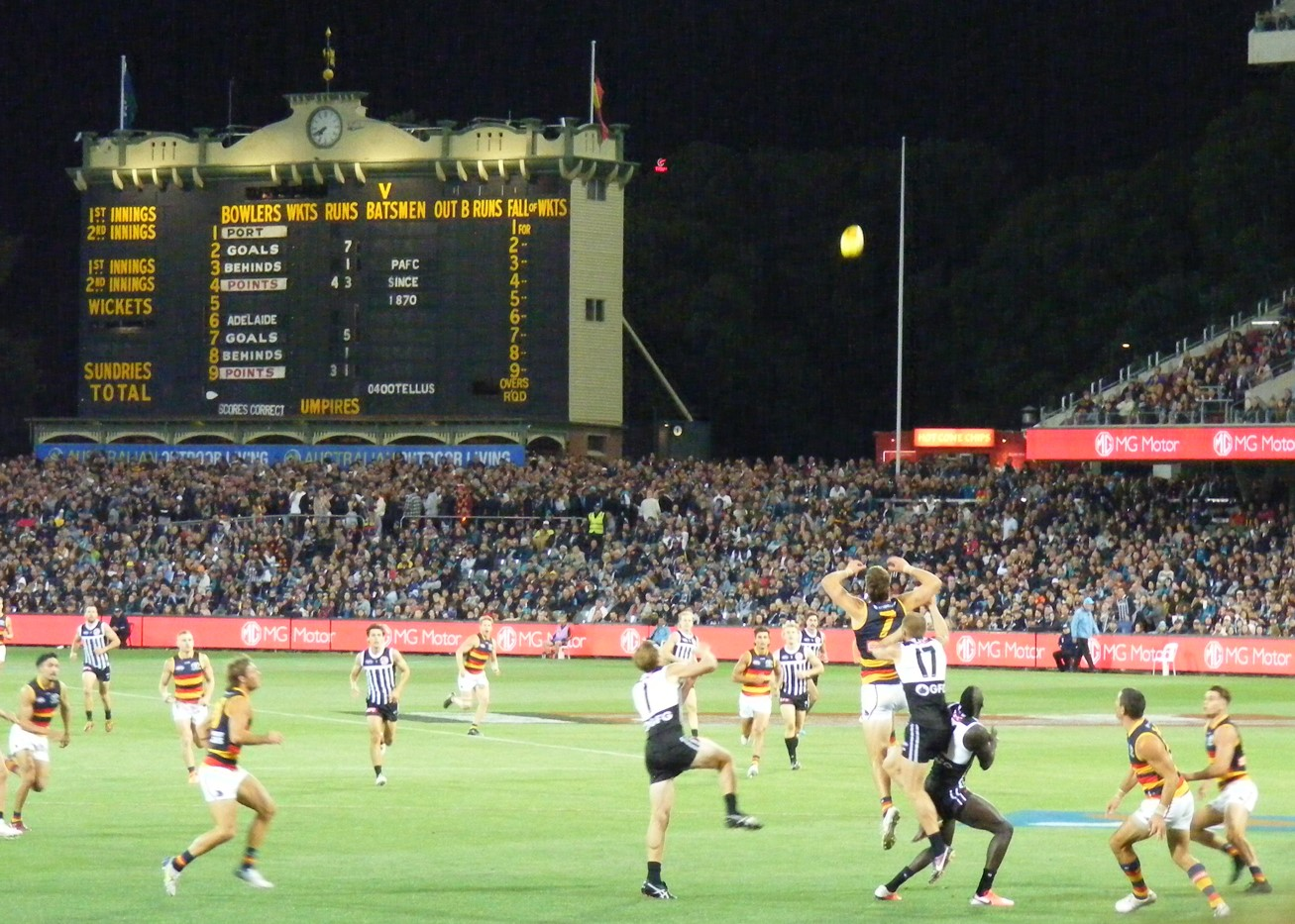
Players competing in a marking contest during Showdown 53.

From 1877 until the 1973 SANFL Grand Final, Adelaide Oval was the marquee ground for South Australian National Football League matches. After a dispute between cricket and SANFL administrators, Australian rules football in South Australia was moved to Football Park in the western suburbs of Adelaide until its permanent return to the ground in 2014. Adelaide Oval hosted the 1889 SAFA Grand Final, the first grand final in any Australian rules football competition after Port Adelaide and Norwood finished the 1889 SAFA season with the same win–loss–draw record. The record crowd for an Australian rules football match at Adelaide Oval was set at the 1965 SANFL Grand Final between Sturt and Port Adelaide when 62,543 saw the latter win by three points. After 1973 Australian rules football matches were sporadically held at the ground apart from South Adelaide games as that club continued to use the ground for their home matches after 1973. After the advent of the Australian Football League in 1990 only one AFL match was held at the ground before it was permanently adopted again by the code, with Port Adelaide hosting Melbourne during the last minor round match of the 2011 AFL season. As of 2014, all SANFL Finals Series matches are played at the ground including the SANFL Grand Final.

=== Australian rules football timeline ===
- 1877 May 12 – The first South Australian Football Association match took place on the ground between the Old Adelaide Football Club and the Bankers Football Club. The original Adelaide club won the match 4 goals to 1.
- 1877 August 18 – St Kilda became the first interstate club to play at Adelaide Oval defeating the original Adelaide Football Club by five goals to two.
- 1885 July 1 – The first football game lit by electric light at the ground was conducted at night.
- 1887 June 20 – After the previous two encounters between Norwood and Port Adelaide were drawn, the South Australia interest in their next meeting set a record for Australian rules football at the time with at least 11,000 spectators present. Attending the match were Chinese General Wong Yung Ho, Consul-General U. Tsing who were both accompanied by Dr. On Lee of Sydney and Mr. Way Lee of Adelaide. The Chinese commissioners were provided the private box of the Governor of South Australia William C. F. Robinson. Norwood won the match by two goals.
- 1889 October 5 – The first Grand Final in a major Australian rules football competition was played between Norwood and Port Adelaide. Norwood won the game 7.4 (7) to 5.9 (5).
- 1892 August 20 – A Broken Hill side was the first team from New South Wales to play at Adelaide Oval. Norwood would beat the visitors by four goals.
- 1894 October 6 – The first drawn Grand Final in a major Australian rules football competition took place when Norwood and South Adelaide both finished on 4.8 (4). Norwood won the replay by a goal.
- 1909 July 10 – Boulder City become the first Western Australian club to play at Adelaide Oval. West Adelaide defeated the visitors by 17 points.
- 1911 August 5 – The Australian Football Council Carnival was held at the ground for the first time and was won by South Australia. The competing leagues fielding representative sides were the SANFL, VFL, VFA, WANFL, TSL and NSW. This was the first time a Tasmanian side had played at Adelaide Oval.
- 1914 October 3 – Port Adelaide defeated the Carlton for a record fourth Championship of Australia title defeating the Victorian side by 34 points, 9.16 (70) to 5.6 (36).
- 1929 August – A women's Australian rules football match was witnessed by 41,000 spectators, a record crowd for a women's Australian rules football match. A de Havilland Moth biplane dropped the game ball to start the match.
- 1945 September 29 – Haydn Bunton Sr, triple Brownlow and Sandover medalist, played for Port Adelaide in the 1945 SANFL Grand Final, the only premiership decider of his career. Despite Port Adelaide obtaining a 32-point lead at quarter time, West Torrens would eventually win the match by 13 points.
- 1965 October 2 – The 1965 SANFL Grand Final crowd set the record attendance for a sporting match at the venue with 62,543 people witnessing Port Adelaide defeat Sturt by three points.
- 1972 October 15 – North Adelaide defeated Carlton to be crowned Champions of Australia defeating the Victorian side by one point being the last time a non-Victorian football side won a national championship until the West Coast Eagles won the 1992 AFL premiership.
- 1973 September 29 – The 1973 SANFL Grand Final between North Adelaide and Glenelg was the last SANFL Grand Final at Adelaide Oval until 2014. Due to the advent of the national Australian Football League in 1990, effectively relegating the SANFL to second tier, it remains the last top flight Grand Final hosted at Adelaide Oval.
- 1990 September 8 – The last game at the ground before the presence of an AFL team in South Australia was between West Torrens and Woodville with the latter winning by 45 points. The clubs would merge the following year.
- 1996 July 20 – The last game at the ground involving Port Adelaide's senior team before entering the AFL was against Sturt with the former side winning by 40 points.
- 2011 September 4 – The first Australian Football League match at the venue was played between Port Adelaide and Melbourne. Port Adelaide won the match by 8 points.
- 2014 March 29 – The first Showdown, between Port Adelaide and Adelaide, was played. Port Adelaide won the game by 55 points.
- 2014 September 7 – The first Australian Football League final at the ground, an elimination final, was played between Port Adelaide and Richmond. Port Adelaide won by 57 points.
- 2017 September 22 – The first preliminary final held at the venue brought the largest crowd for an AFL match at the Oval to date. 53,817 watched Adelaide defeat Geelong by 61 points.
- 2019 March 31 – The first AFLW Grand Final to be held at the ground featured the Adelaide Crows defeating Carlton by 45 points.
- 2023 April 13 – The first AFL Gather Round is held in Adelaide. The venue hosted six of the nine matches across four days.
- 2025 August 16 – A new AFL attendance record is set at the venue, with 54,283 attendees at Adelaide vs Collingwood surpassing the previous record set in 2017.

=== Australian rules football records ===
The first senior league Australian rules football match was played on Adelaide Oval in 1877 between the original Adelaide club and the Bankers club. The 1990 SANFL season was the last year that the competition was the highest level of Australian rules football in South Australia. In 1991 the newly created Adelaide Crows entered the Australian Football League, subsequently playing the highest level of football in the state. Port Adelaide would join the Australian Football League in 1997.

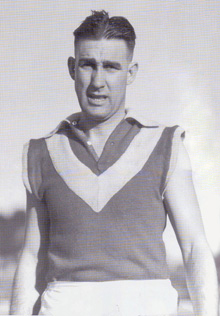
Ken Farmer
(North Adelaide) Most goals outright (347) and equal most goals alongside Neil Hawke (Port Adelaide) in a single match (15).

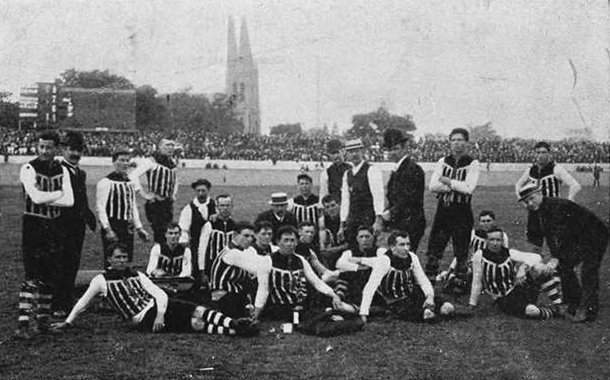
Port Adelaide
Port Adelaide won 20 Grand Finals and four Championship of Australia titles at the Oval.

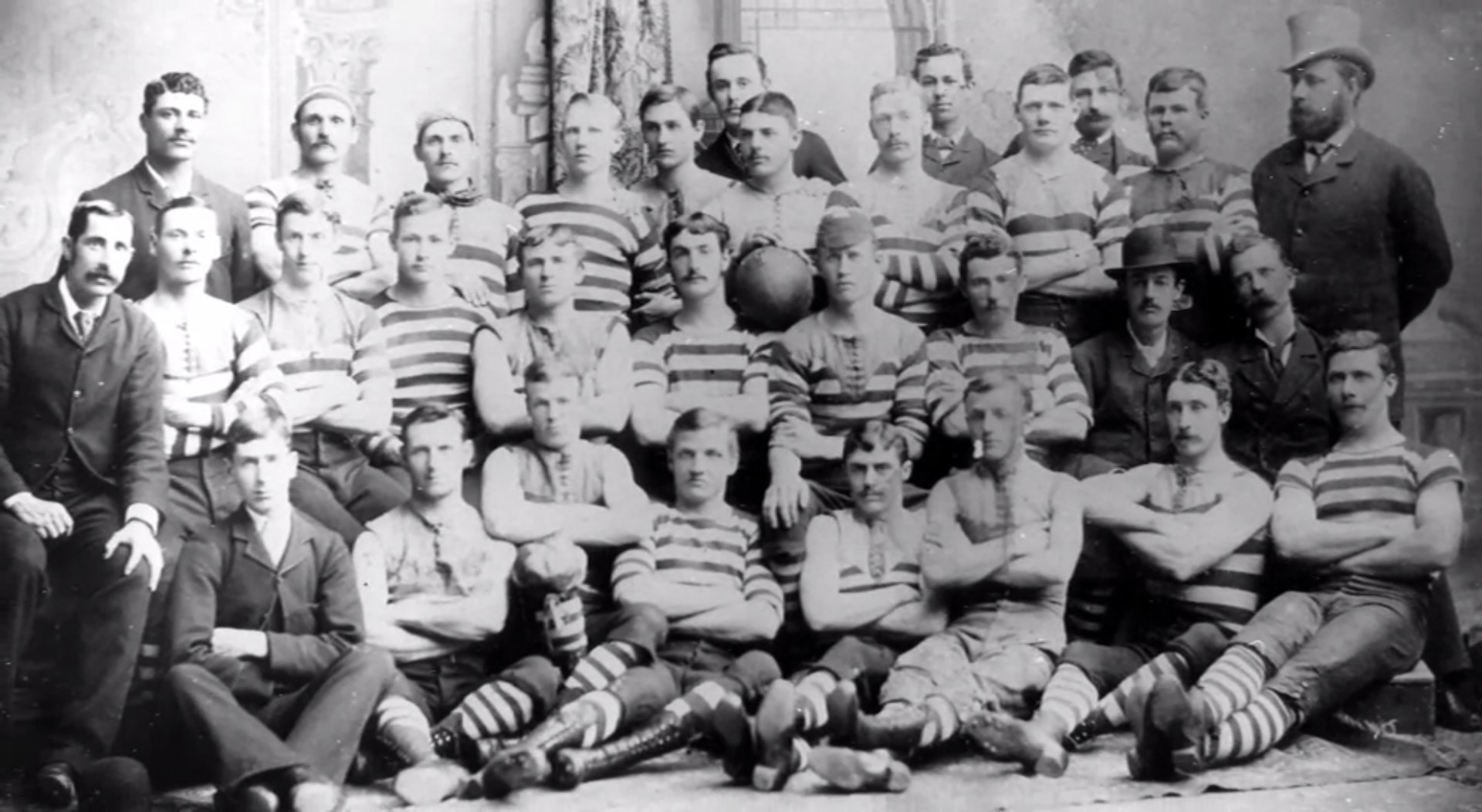
South Adelaide
The SAFC used Adelaide Oval as its home ground between 1882–1903 and 1905–1994.

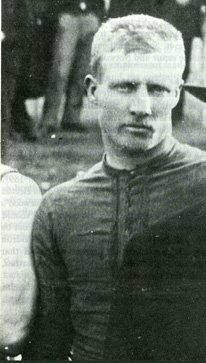
Alfred Waldron
Captain of Norwood for the 1889 SAFA Grand Final, the first Grand Final in a major Australian rules competition.

== Non-primary sporting events ==
The Adelaide Oval has a number of non-primary sports including soccer, cycling, rugby, baseball, American football, tennis and field hockey.

== Miscellaneous events ==
The largest spectator event of the 19th century at the Adelaide Oval was the "Grand Corroboree", a corroboree performed by around 100 Aboriginal men and women from Point MacLeay mission and Yorke Peninsula on Friday 29 and Saturday 30 May 1885. They had been invited to Adelaide by the colonial government to perform as part of the Queen's Birthday celebrations. After organisers expected a crowd of around 5,000, approximately 20,000 spectators (around a sixth of Adelaide's population) turned up. The crowd became rowdy and police had to clear the performance space before the event could begin. Profits from the show were assigned to the Aboriginal people. The corroboree was so successful that other performances were arranged at other venues. Also at this time, the first football match held between Aboriginal and non-Aboriginal teams in Adelaide was organised by Football and Cricketing Association secretary John Creswell, and a second followed at the oval on 2 June 1885.

Due to the COVID-19 pandemic in South Australia, the Adelaide Christmas Pageant was held at Adelaide Oval to a permitted audience of 25,000 in 2020, and 16,000 in 2021. Tickets were drawn from a raffle, and the pageant was held in the evening. The 2022 pageant returned to the streets, although Adelaide Oval was reserved in the event of another variant.

== Concerts ==
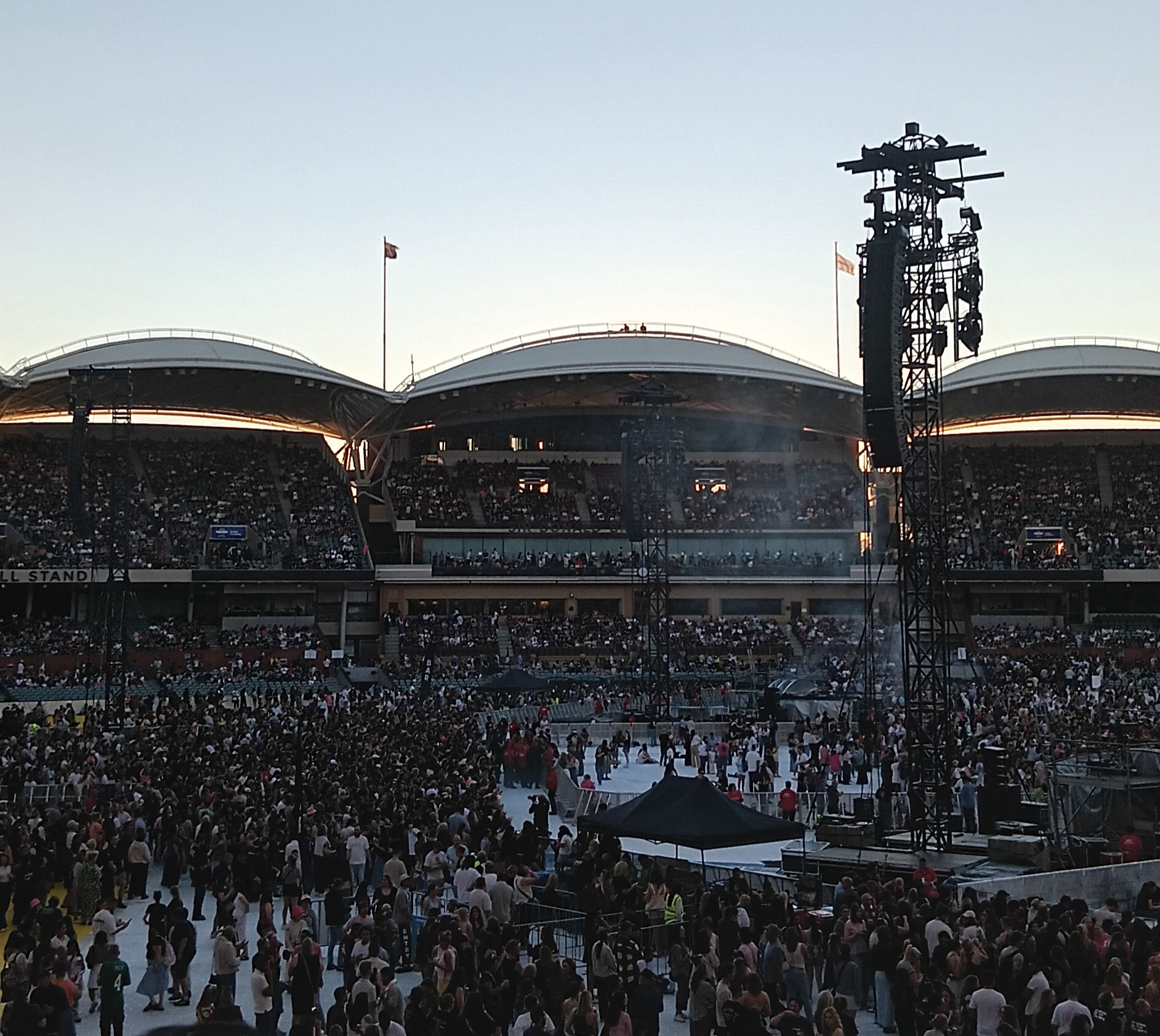
Ed Sheeran Loop Tour March 2026

Adelaide Oval has regularly been host to large outdoor concerts. The first major international act to perform at the Oval was Fleetwood Mac, in 1977. Many big names have performed there since, including David Bowie, Linda Ronstadt, Kiss, Simon and Garfunkel, Paul McCartney and Wings, Madonna, Michael Jackson, Elton John, Billy Joel, Neil Diamond, Pearl Jam, AC/DC, Metallica, the Foo Fighters, Ed Sheeran and Robbie Williams.

== Attendance records ==
A concert by Adele in March 2017, attracting an audience of 70,000, was "the largest ever attendance for a concert in South Australia".

Other notable record-setting events at the Adelaide Oval include:

- The "Grand Corroboree", on Friday 29 and Saturday 30 May 1885, witnessed by 20,000 spectators
- The motorcade for the 1927 Royal Tour of Australia by the Duke and Duchess of York, attracting between 60 and 70,000 spectators
- A 1942 American football match, attracting 25,000 locals, as part of American Independence Day celebrations
- The 1965 SANFL Grand Final, witnessing Port Adelaide 12.8 (80) defeat Sturt 12.5 (77), attracting 62,543 spectators
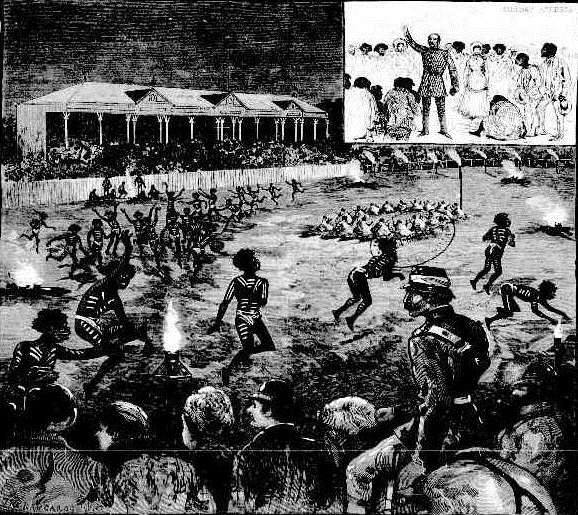
Aboriginal corroboree (1885)

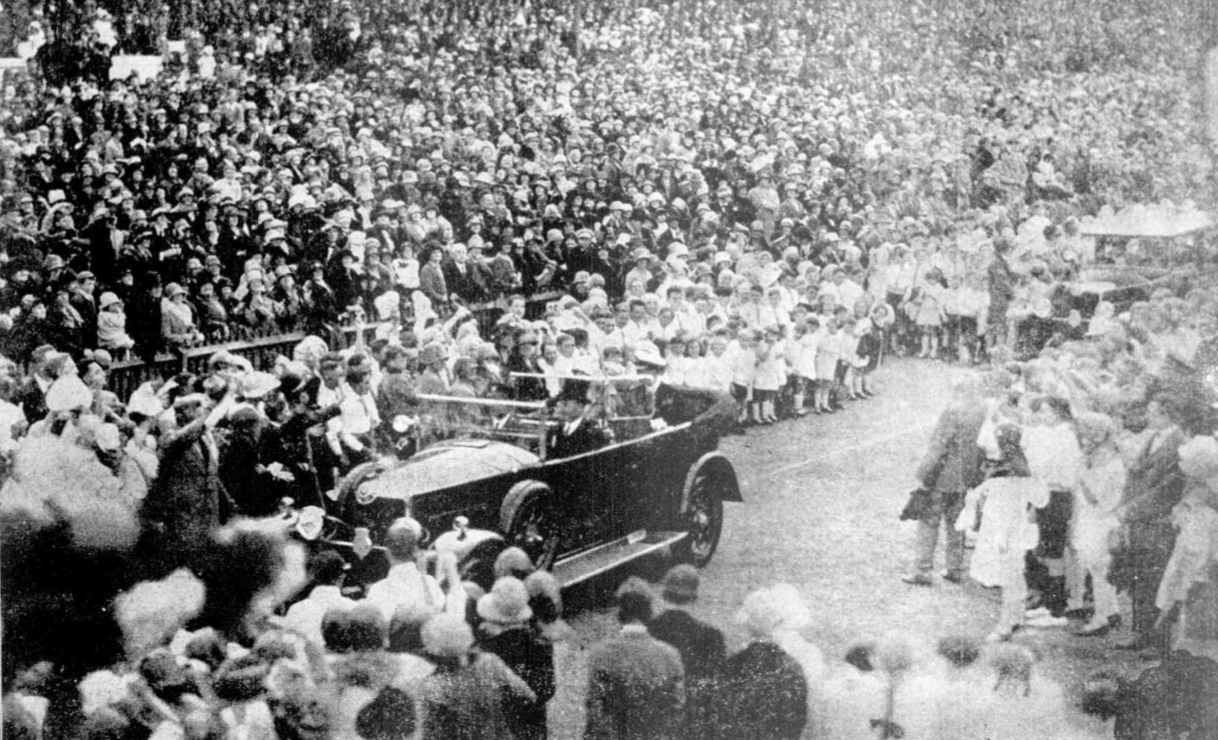
Motorcade, 1927 Royal Tour

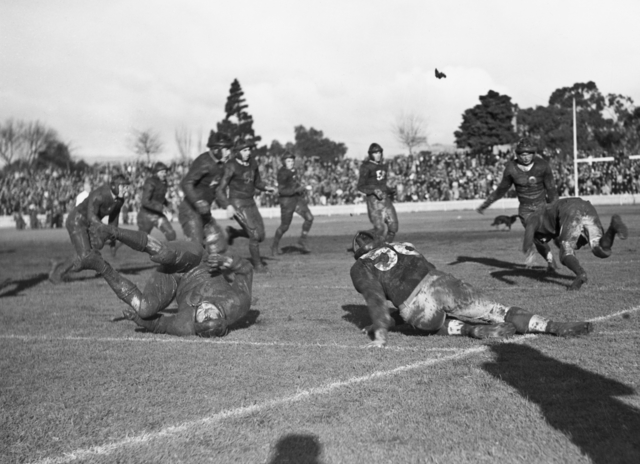
American football (1942)

1965 SANFL Grand Final

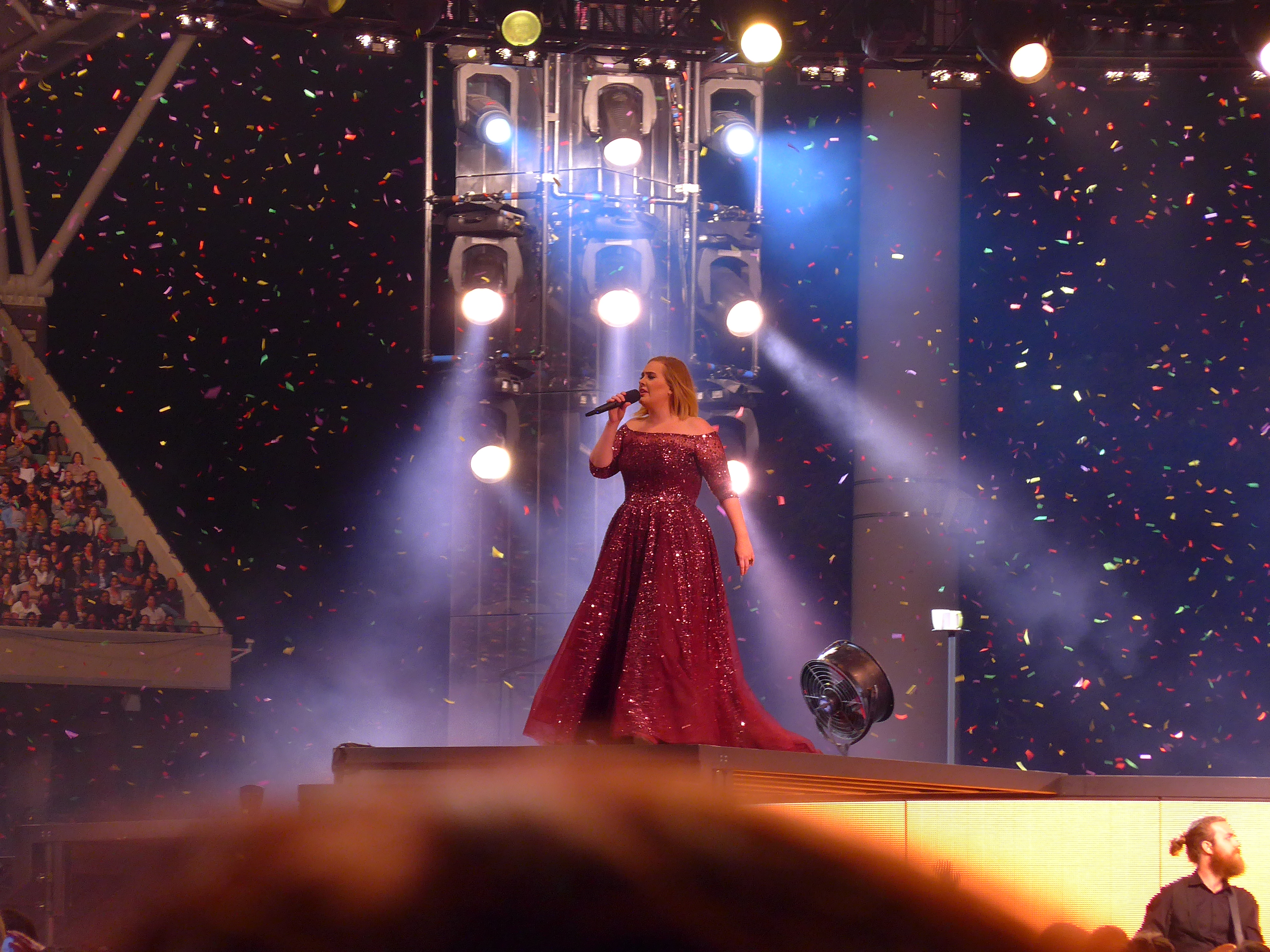
2017 Adele concert

== Curators ==
Since 1872 there have been 10 curators of the Adelaide Oval.

1. George Gooden (1872–1873)
2. Thomas Dickson (1875–1878)
3. Jesse Hide (1878–1883)
4. Charlie Checkett (1883–1919)
5. George Dunn (1919–1920)
6. Albert Wright (1920–1938)
7. Stan Williams (1939–1953)
8. Arthur Lance (1953–1980)
9. Les Burdett (1980–2010)
10. Damian Hough (2010–present)

== Statues ==
Adelaide Oval statues
Subject	Unveiling	Notability	Sculptor	Donator	Location
Hercules	1892	Roman god		WA Horn	Pennington Gardens
Ross Smith	1892	Aviator	Frederick Brook Hitch		Creswell Gardens
Donald Bradman	2002	Cricketer	Robert Hannaford		East Gate
Jason Gillespie	2010	Cricketer	Ken Martin	Basil Sellers	SACA members reserve
Darren Lehmann	2012	Cricketer	Ken Martin	Basil Sellers	SACA members reserve
Barrie Robran	2014	Australian rules footballer		Basil Sellers	South Gate
George Giffen	2014	Cricketer	Judith Rolevink	Basil Sellers	
Russell Ebert	2015	Australian rules footballer		Basil Sellers	East Gate
Malcolm Blight	2016	Australian rules footballer		Basil Sellers	South East concourse
Ken Farmer	2017	Australian rules footballer		Basil Sellers	North West gate
Clem Hill	2018	Cricketer	Silvio Appunyi	Basil Sellers	South Gate

== Transport access ==
Adelaide Metro offers free "Footy Express" services on AFL game days, abbreviated 'AO' and 'AOX' services.

Public transport access
Service	Station/stop	Line/route	Walking distance
Adelaide Metro buses	King William Rd; Montefiore Rd; North Terrace; Victoria Dr	Several routes	300 m 400 m 650 m 400 m
Adelaide Metro Footy Express buses	King William Rd; Sir Edwin Smith Ave; Victoria Dr	20 routes 6 routes 4 routes	300 m 300 m 550 m
Adelaide Metro trains	Adelaide	7 lines	550 m
Adelaide Metro trams	Adelaide, North Terrace; Festival Plaza, King William Rd	Glenelg, Botanic Gardens; Festival	650 m

== See also ==
- Disappearance of Joanne Ratcliffe and Kirste Gordon
- List of Australian Football League grounds
- List of Oceanian stadiums by capacity
- List of Test cricket grounds
- List of Australian rules football statues, a list of Australian rules football-related statues across Australia
