= Charlie Checkett =

Sports oval curator

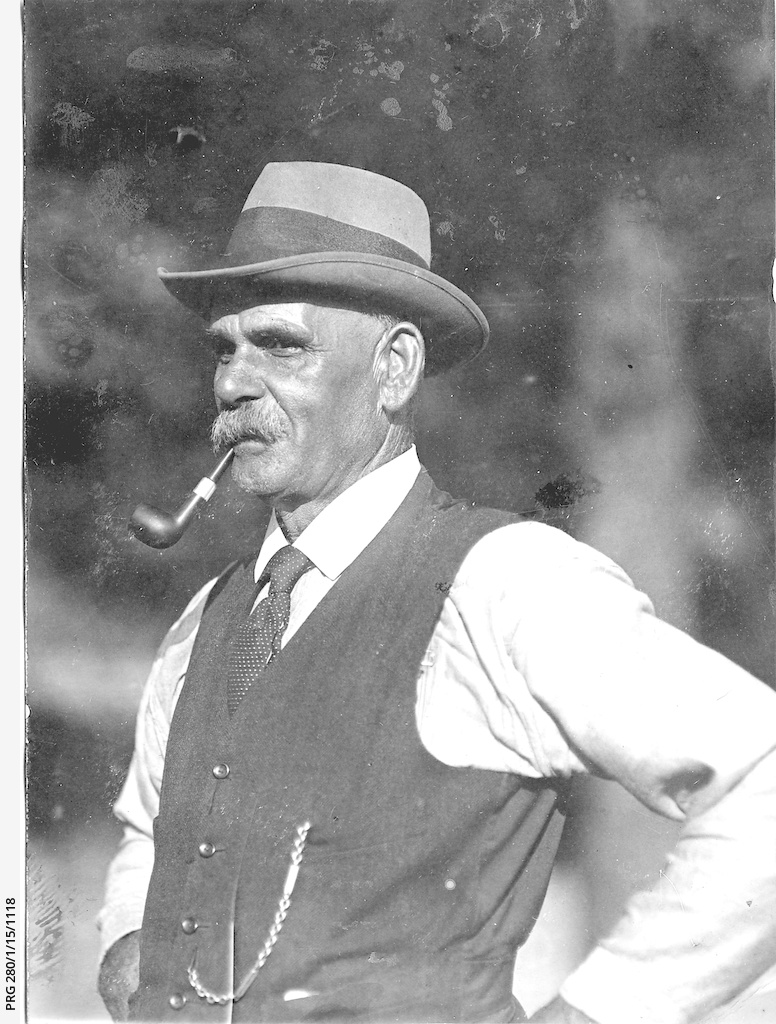
- Checkett c. 1916
- Born: c. 1856
- Died: 25 August 1930 (aged 73–74)
- Occupation: Curator of the Adelaide Oval
- Years active: 1883–1919

Charlie Checkett (c. 1856- August 25th 1930) succeeded Jesse Hide as Curator of the Adelaide Oval in 1883. Checkett was succeeded by George Dunn in 1919. Checkett was the 4th Adelaide Oval Curator.

== Adelaide Oval's curator ==
In 1883 Checkett became the 4th curator of the Adelaide Oval; he was the longest-serving curator. He served until 1919 when he retired due to his health. He would sit up all night with a revolver to guard the pitch when a test match was in progress. Checkett died in 1930 after being ill for several months.

Checkett considered Harold Oliver "The greatest footballer that South Australia has produced".

== Legacy ==
After Checkett retired a special match was played for him at the Adelaide Oval for his 37 years of service. After Checkett Retired he went into the business as an hotelkeeper. He was a partner in the Perseverance Hotel Adelaide at the time of his death. In 2024 during the Australia v. West Indies Test cricket match at the Adelaide Oval the SACA unveiled an honour board for the curators of the oval.
