= Arthur Lance =

Curator of the Adelaide Oval

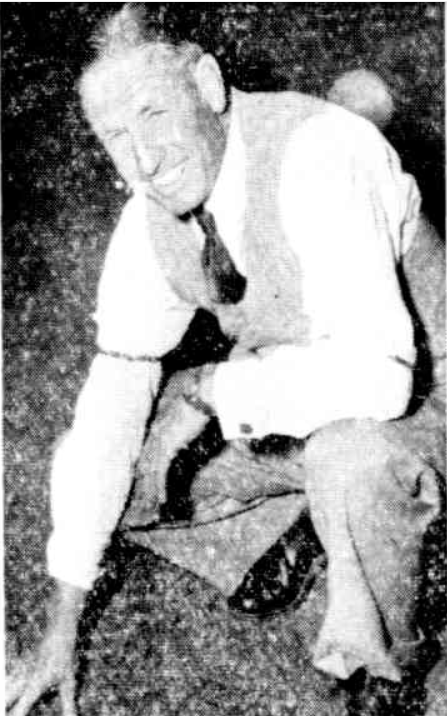
- Lance c. 1950
- Born: c. 1917
- Died: 1999 (aged 81-82)
- Occupation: Curator of the Adelaide Oval
- Years active: 1953–1980

Arthur Lance (c. 1917–1999) was the curator of the Adelaide Oval between 1953 and 1980. He was preceded by Stan Williams as curator and was succeeded by Les Burdett.

Lance played football for the Sturt team which he left in 1946. He succeeded Williams after he stepped down due to health reasons. Lance was curator until 1980 when he retired. He died in 1999.

== Legacy ==
In 2024 during the Australia v. West Indies Test cricket match at the Adelaide Oval the SACA unveiled an honour board for the curators of the oval.
