= Jesse Hide =

English cricketer

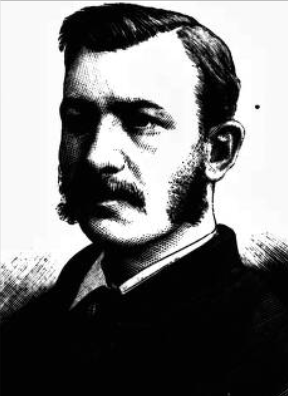
- Hide c. 1884

Personal information
- Full name: Jesse Bollard Hide
- Born: 12 March 1857; Eastbourne, Sussex, England
- Died: 19 March 1924 (aged 67); Edinburgh, Scotland
- Batting: Right-handed
- Bowling: Right-arm fast
- Relatives: Arthur Hide (brother)

Domestic team information
- Years: Team
- 1876–1893: Sussex
- 1880/81–1882/83: South Australia
- FC debut: 12 June 1876 Sussex v Gloucestershire
- Last FC: 10 August 1893 Sussex v Somerset

Career statistics
Competition	First-class
Matches	176
Runs scored	4,824
Batting average	15.92
100s/50s	4/13
Top score	173
Balls bowled	26,439
Wickets	441
Bowling average	21.70
5 wickets in innings	19
10 wickets in match	4
Best bowling	8/47
Catches/stumpings	112/–
- Source: CricketArchive, February 2012

Jesse Bollard Hide (12 March 1857 — 19 March 1924) was an English cricketer who played for Sussex between 1876 and 1893 and for South Australia from 1880 to 1883, where he also acted as coach and curator of the ground. Hide was born in Eastbourne, Sussex.

== Cricketer ==
A right-handed batsman, accurate fast-medium bowler and good fieldsman, he made his first-class debut for Sussex in 1876 against Gloucestershire. In 1878, on the recommendation of James Lillywhite, who had captained England on their tour of Australia in 1876-77, Hide was appointed coach of the South Australian Cricket Association, and spent five seasons in Adelaide, playing in all of South Australia's important matches. He and also became the curator of the Adelaide Oval, where he was responsible for laying the pitch, bringing in the soil that made the pitch "equal to the best provided in any part of the world". In his history of Australian cricket Johnny Moyes credits Hide with a leading part in the early development of South Australian cricket. Hide returned to England in 1883 and carried on playing for Sussex until 1893. He made over 4,400 runs and took over 400 wickets for Sussex. He played for a number of other teams including England XI, England, The Rest, the South, Players, Players of the South, Lord Sheffield's XI and Lord March's XI. Playing for Sussex against MCC at Lord's in May 1890 he took four wickets in four deliveries. He was for some time employed by Lord Sheffield. Hide died in Edinburgh at the age of 67.
