= Albert Wright (Australian cricketer) =

Australian cricketer

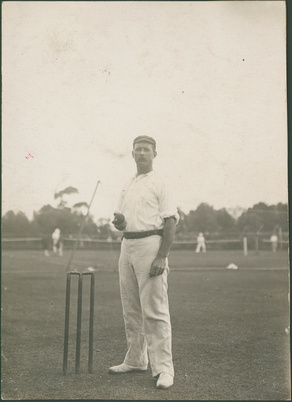
- Wright c. 1920

Personal information
- Full name: Albert William Wright
- Born: 24 September 1875; Adelaide, Australia
- Died: 23 December 1938 (aged 63); Adelaide, Australia
- Batting: Right-handed
- Bowling: Right-arm leg-spin
- Role: Bowler

Domestic team information
- Years: Team
- 1905/06–1920/21: South Australia

Career statistics
Competition	First-class
Matches	30
Runs scored	242
Batting average	7.56
100s/50s	0/1
Top score	53
Balls bowled	6,150
Wickets	110
Bowling average	30.81
5 wickets in innings	7
10 wickets in match	1
Best bowling	7/66
Catches/stumpings	8/–
- Source: Cricinfo, 5 July 2023

Albert William Wright (24 September 1875 – 23 December 1938) was an Australian cricketer. He played in 30 first-class matches for South Australia between 1905 and 1920 before taking over the preparation of the Adelaide Oval.

== Early life ==
Wright was born on 24 September 1875. To William Henry Wright. He grew up in the Adelaide suburb of Norwood, and was educated at Sturt Street school, but he did not play cricket there. He started cricket with a Sunday-school team.

Wright an iron-moulder and a A-grade footballer for West Adelaide starting in the 1897 season.

Wright married Clara Elizabeth Doran in Adelaide on 29 April 1901.

== Cricketer ==
A leg-spin bowler, Wright began his first-class career at the age of 30 in December 1905. In his second Sheffield Shield match, he took his best innings figures of 7 for 66 when South Australia beat Victoria. Five years later he took his best match figures of 11 for 176 (5 for 75 and 6 for 101) in a 285-run victory over New South Wales.

Wright played first-class cricket for South Australia in 30 matches from 1905 to 1920, finishing with 110 wickets at a bowling average of 30.81, and 242 runs at a batting average of 7.56. Towards the end of his playing career, Wright became curator at the Adelaide Oval, succeeding George Dunn after he had been acting curator since March of that year.

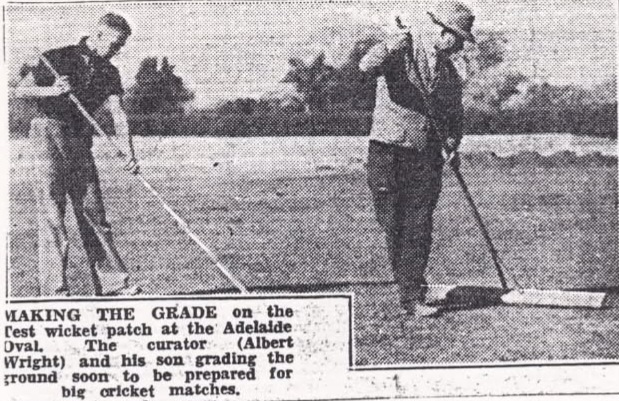
Wright and his son preparing Adelaide Oval in 1932

In 1927 the New South Wales captain complimented Wright for his work and during the years 1923 to 1929 the Adelaide Oval received some heavy modifications and new additions were added to the grounds.

== Personal life ==
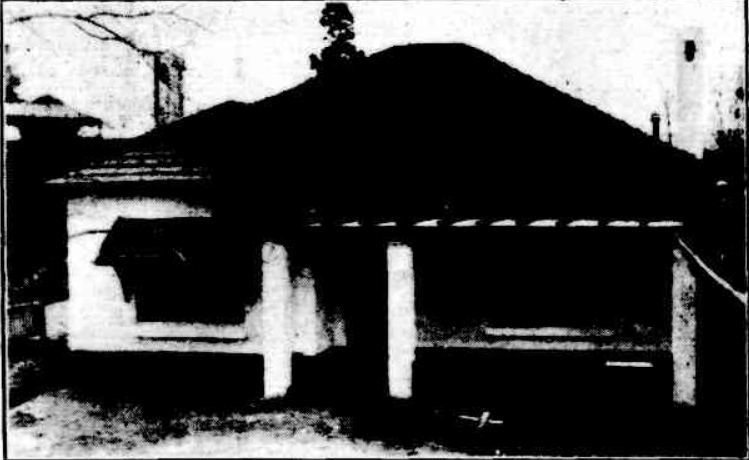
Wright's Oval Home c. 1928

Wright married Clara Elizabeth Doran (1876–1959) in Adelaide on 29 April 1901. Wright lived at the Adelaide Oval with his family. In May 1935 Wright was assaulted by William John Tremellen, who was later prosecuted for the crime.

== Death ==
Wright died in Adelaide on 23 December 1938 from a short illness after undergoing an operation earlier in the week. The Flags at the Adelaide Oval were half mast. His funeral left his residence on December 25, 1938 at 2:30pm for West terrace cemetery. Wright was survived by his wife, four sons, Albert, Clem, Charles and Lindsay, and two daughters, Florence and Clara. After Albert's death the BBC paid a tribute to Wright and his popularity with English cricketers.
