= Australian cricket team in New Zealand in 1909–10 =

International cricket tour

Australian tour of New Zealand 1909/10
- Dates: Feb 1910 – Apr 1910
- Cricket format: First-class
- Matches: 7
- Most runs: Edgar Mayne (532)
- Most wickets: Bill Whitty (42)

The Australia national cricket team toured New Zealand from February to April 1910 and played seven first-class matches including two against the New Zealand national cricket team. New Zealand at this time had not been elevated to Test status.

Australia won five of the seven first-class matches by comfortable margins, including the two against New Zealand. The match against Canterbury was a close draw, and the last match, against Hawke's Bay, was abandoned without any play taking place.

== Background ==
In late 1908, The New Zealand Cricket Council asked the Australian Board of Control of Cricket to consider a proposal that the Australian team selected for the 1909 Ashes tour play a series of matches in New Zealand prior to departing for England, as had been the case for the previous tour in 1904/05. The Australian Board declined this proposal and offered to send a Second Eleven team instead. The New Zealand authorities rejected this proposal on the grounds that a second-string team would not make the tour a financial success and asked the Australian Board on what terms would the Australian side visit New Zealand on their return journey from England. Again, this proposal was rejected by the Australian Board and the arrangements for the tour were pushed back to the 1909/10 season.

== Team ==
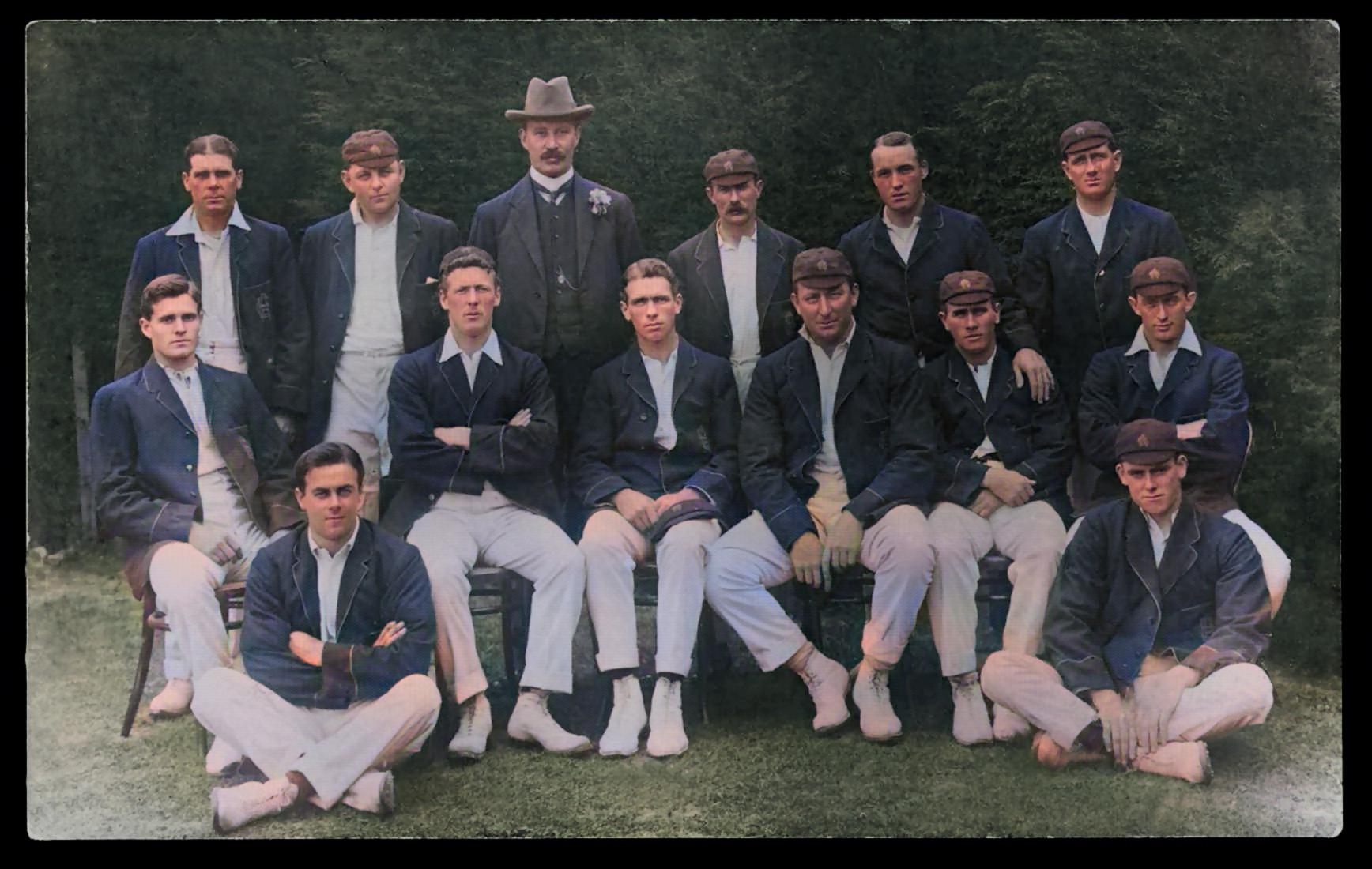
The Australian Cricket Team in New Zealand 1909/10 Back Row: C.R. Gorry, N. Dodds, A.C.K. Mackenzie (Manager), T.S. Warne, A.J.Y Hopkins, D.B.M. Smith Middle Row: C. Kelleway, A.C. Facy, E.R. Mayne, W.W. Armstrong (Captain), S.H. Emery, C.E. Simpson Front Row: W. Bardsley (Vice-captain), W.J. Whitty

On 14 Jan 1910 the Australian Board of Control of Cricket met and appointed a selection committee of Clem Hill, Frank Iredale and Peter McAlister to choose the touring squad and appointed Alick Mackenzie as the tour manager and Australian Board representative. The appointment of Mackenzie to this role was seen as a reward for his services to Australian cricket after a long career. The 1909/10 season was his last in competitive cricket. It was his second tour of New Zealand having previously toured with the New South Wales side in 1893/94.

The Australian Board of Control asked each state representative on the board to nominate a set number of players from their state for selection. New South Wales, Victoria and South Australia were asked to nominate six players each, while Queensland and Tasmania were asked to nominate two each. From this pool of 22 players the selectors would choose a final touring squad of 13.

Of the players initially selected, Gar Waddy and Stanley Hill were unavailable to make the tour. They were replaced in the team by Tom Warne and Charles Simpson respectively.

Australian touring party to New Zealand 1909/10
Name	Age	Role	Batting Style	Bowling Style	First-Class Team	Notes
Alick Mackenzie (Manager)	39	Team manager	Right-handed	-	New South Wales	
Warwick Armstrong (Captain)	30	All-rounder	Right-handed	Right-arm legspin	Victoria	
Warren Bardsley (Vice-captain)	27	Batter	Left-handed	-	New South Wales	
Norman Dodds	33	Batter	Right-handed	-	Tasmania	
Sid Emery	24	Bowler	Right-handed	Legbreak googly	New South Wales	
Ashley Facy	24	Bowler	Right-handed	Right-arm fast	Tasmania	
Charles Gorry	31	Wicket-keeper	Right-handed	-	New South Wales	
~~Stanley Hill~~	~~24~~	~~Batter~~	~~Right-handed~~	~~-~~	South Australia	Replaced by Charles Simpson
Bert Hopkins	35	All-rounder	Right-handed	Right-arm fast-medium	New South Wales	
Charles Kelleway	23	All-rounder	Right-handed	Right-arm fast-medium	New South Wales	
Edgar Mayne	27	Batter	Right-handed	-	South Australia	
Charles Simpson	27	Batter	Right-handed	Right-arm off-spin	Queensland	
Dave Smith	25	Batsman	Right-handed	-	Victoria	
Tom Warne	40	All-rounder	Right-handed	Right-arm leg-spin	Victoria	
~~Gar Waddy~~	~~30~~	~~Wicket-keeper~~	~~Right-handed~~		New South Wales	Replaced by Tom Warne
Bill Whitty	23	Bowler	Right-handed	Left-arm fast-medium	South Australia	

The touring party was not a full-strength Australian team. Of the selected players, only Armstrong, Bardsley, Hopkins and Whitty had previously played Test cricket and no other players outside of those four had toured with the 1909 Australian team in England. Outside those four, Emery, Kelleway, Mayne and Smith went on to play Tests.

== The tour ==
The touring party left Australia on 5 February 1910, departing Sydney on the steamship Moeraki, and arrived in New Zealand at Wellington on 9 February. On the evening of their arrival the touring party were officially welcomed to Wellington at a function in the town hall hosted by Dr. Alfred Newman.

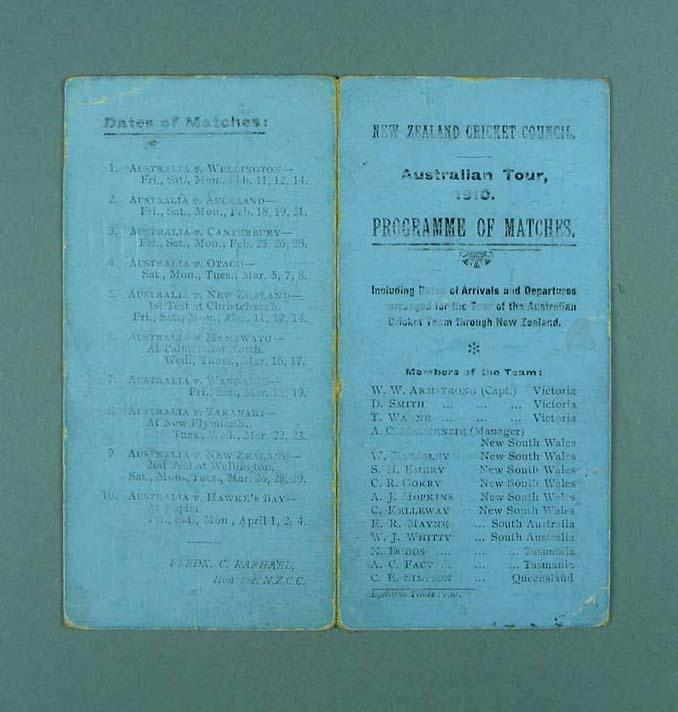
The official programme of matches for the tour

=== Tour itinerary ===
Date	Opponent		Venue	Match type	Result	Notes
11-14 Feb 1910	Wellington	KKR	Basin Reserve, Wellington	First-Class	Australians won by 6 wickets	3-day match; rest day on 13 Feb.
18-21 Feb 1910	Auckland	AA	Auckland Domain, Auckland	First-Class	Australians won by an innings and 128 runs	3-day match; rest day on 20 Feb.
25-28 Feb 1910	Canterbury	KKR	Lancaster Park, Christchurch	First-Class	Draw	3-day match; rest day on 27 Feb.
5-8 Mar 1910	Otago		Carisbrook, Dunedin	First-Class	Australians won by 10 wickets	3-day match; rest day on 6 Mar.
11-14 Mar 1910	New Zealand		Lancaster Park, Christchurch	First-Class	Australia won by 9 wickets	3-day match; rest day on 13 Mar.
16-17 Mar 1910	Manawatu XIII		Sports Ground, Palmerston North	Minor	Australians won by an innings and 104 runs	2-day match
18-19 Mar 1910	Wanganui		Cooks Gardens, Wanganui	Minor	Australians won by six wickets	2-day match
22-23 Mar 1910	Taranaki XV		Pukekura Park (Recreation Ground), New Plymouth	Minor	Draw	2-day match
26-29 Mar 1910	New Zealand		Basin Reserve, Wellington	First-Class	Australia won by 162 runs	3-day match; rest day on 27 Mar.
1-4 Apr 1910	Hawke's Bay		Recreation Ground, Napier	First-Class	Match abandoned due to rain	3-day match; rest day on 3 Apr.

== Match summaries ==
=== Australia v Wellington ===
11–14 February 1910
Scorecard

Wellington	v	Australia
107 (31.4 overs); D.M. Patrick 25; W.J. Whitty 3/16 (8.0 overs)		130 (25.4 overs); C.E. Simpson 51; D.M. Patrick 5/13 (7.0 overs)
208 (59 overs); F.A. Midlane 67; W.W. Armstrong 4/56 (21 overs)		188/4 (32 overs); E.R. Mayne 58; C.E.H Hickey 2/41 (6 overs)

Australia won by 6 wickets
Basin Reserve, Wellington
Umpires: Daniel McKenzie, J. Varnham

- Wellington won the toss and elected to bat

=== Australia v Auckland ===
18–21 February 1910
Scorecard

Auckland	v	Australia
112 (44.0 overs); A.E. Relf 51; W.J. Whitty 8/27 (22.0 overs)		355 (99.3 overs); E.R. Mayne 136; C. Olliff 3/77 (20.0 overs)
115 (32 overs); A.E. Hadden 27*; S.H. Emery 5/42 (10 overs)

Australia won by an innings and 128 runs
Auckland Domain, Auckland
Umpires: Sammy Jones, Clarence van der Heyde

- Australia won the toss and elected to bowl

=== Australia v Canterbury ===
25–28 February 1910
Scorecard

Canterbury	v	Australia
321 (80.3 overs); D. Reese 108; W.J. Whitty 4/69 (19.0 overs)		240 (48.5 overs); S.H. Emery 50*; J.H. Bennett 4/61 (16.5 overs)
259 (58.4 overs); D. Reese 41; W.W. Armstrong 4/83 (19.0 overs)		307/8 (77 overs); W.W. Armstrong 149; J.H. Bennett 4/87 (29.0 overs)

Match Drawn
Lancaster Park, Christchurch
Umpires: C. Hardy, Alfred Hart

- Canterbury won the toss and elected to bat

=== Australia v Otago ===
5–8 March 1910
Scorecard

Otago	v	Australia
166 (66.4 overs); H.G. Siedeberg 50; T.S Warne 5/37 (13.0 overs)		189 (55.5 overs); W.W. Armstrong 91; C.G. Macartney 7/81 (24.5 overs)
120 (63 overs); C.G. Macartney 45; S.H. Emery 5/20 (10.0 overs)		99/0 (23 overs); W. Barsdley 56

Match Drawn
Carisbrook, Dunedin
Umpires: A. Austin, R. Ferguson

- Otago won the toss and elected to bat

=== 1st Unofficial Test Australia v New Zealand ===
11–14 March 1910
Scorecard

New Zealand	v	Australia
155 (46.0 overs); DA. Sims 51*; W.J. Whitty 6/53 (22.0 overs)		306 (91.3 overs); W. Bardsley 97; J.H. Bennett 5/74 (25.3 overs)
258 (87.3 overs); F. Midlane 47 A.E. Hadden 47; A.J.Y. Hopkins 4/34 (10.3 overs)		1/108 (20.5 overs); E.R. Mayne 74*; J.H. Bennett 1/15 (7.5 overs)

Australia won by 9 wickets
Lancaster Park, Christchurch

- Australia won the toss and elected to bowl

=== Australia v Manawatu XIII ===
16–17 March 1910
Scorecard

Manawatu	v	Australia
87; R. Cobbe 32; W.J. Whitty 6/36		304; D. Smith 107
113; A.M. Ongley; W.J. Whitty 3/22

Australian XI won by an innings and 104 runs
Sports Ground, Palmerston North

- Wellington won the toss and elected to bat

=== 2nd Unofficial Test Australia v New Zealand ===
26–29 March 1910
Scorecard

Australia	v	New Zealand
260 (52.0 overs); D.B.M. Smith 102; A.W.S. Brice 5/70 (18.0 overs)		177 (68.0 overs); D. Reese 69*; A.C. Facy 7/71 (28.0 overs)
232/5d (47.0 overs); E.R. Mayne 90; D.M. Sandman 2/62 (16.0 overs)		153 (41 overs); A.W.S. Brice 43; W.J. Whitty 6/28 (16 overs)

Australia won by 162 runs
Basin Reserve, Wellington
Umpires: Daniel McKenzie, J. Varnham

- Australia won the toss and elected to bat

== First-class statistics ==
=== Batting ===
Name	Matches	Innings	Not Outs	100s	50s	H.S.	Runs	Average
Edgar Mayne	6	11	2	2	3	136	532	59.11
Warwick Armstrong	6	8	1	1	2	149*	393	56.14
Warren Bardsley	6	11	2	0	3	97	375	41.67
Dave Smith	6	9	1	1	0	102	206	25.75
Charles Kelleway	6	8	1	0	1	51	187	26.71
Charles Simpson	5	8	1	0	1	51	155	22.14
Sid Emery	6	8	2	0	1	50*	114	19.00
Tom Warne	4	5	2	0	1	54	112	37.33
Norman Dodds	3	5	0	0	1	53	84	16.80
Bill Whitty	6	7	1	0	0	14	53	8.83
Charles Gorry	5	5	3	0	0	11*	25	12.5
Ashley Facy	3	4	1	0	0	7*	17	5.67
Bert Hopkins	4	5	0	0	0	8	16	3.20

=== Bowling ===
Name	Matches	Balls Bowled	Maidens	Runs	Wickets	Best Bowling	Average	Strike rate	Economy Rate
Bill Whitty	6	1312	69	510	42	8/27	12.14	31.24	2.33
Sid Emery	6	552	15	355	22	5/20	16.14	25.09	3.86
Warwick Armstrong	6	745	27	367	16	4/56	22.94	46.56	2.96
Ashley Facy	3	366	12	178	11	7/71	16.18	33.27	2.92
Bert Hopkins	4	375	17	163	9	4/34	18.11	41.67	2.61
Tom Warne	4	210	6	154	7	5/37	22.00	30.00	4.40
Charles Kelleway	6	276	10	116	5	2/1	23.20	55.20	2.52
Charles Simpson	5	232	11	52	1	1/5	52.00	232.00	1.34
