= 1909–10 Sheffield Shield season =

Australian cricket tournament

1909–10 Sheffield Shield
- Cricket format: First-class
- Tournament format: Double round-robin
- Champions: South Australia (2nd title)
- Participants: 3
- Matches: 6
- Most runs: Clem Hill (South Australia) – 609 runs
- Most wickets: Sid Emery (New South Wales) – 23 wickets

The 1909–10 Sheffield Shield season was the 18th season of the Sheffield Shield, the domestic first-class cricket competition of Australia. South Australia won the championship.

== Table ==
| Team | Pld | W | L | D | Pts |
|---|---|---|---|---|---|
| South Australia | 4 | 3 | 1 | 0 | 2 |
| New South Wales | 4 | 2 | 2 | 0 | 0 |
| Victoria | 4 | 1 | 3 | 0 | -2 |

== Fixtures ==
13–18 November 1909
Scorecard

| (H) South Australia | v | Victoria |
| 590 (158.2 overs); Clem Hill 176; William Scott 5/91 (24.2 overs) | | 284 (89.1 overs); Gerry Hazlitt 89*; Robert Rees 5/88 (31.1 overs) |
| | | 97 f/o (34 overs); Tom Warne 24*; Robert Rees 5/41 (13 overs) |

South Australia won by an innings and 209 runs
Adelaide Oval, Adelaide
Umpires: Philip Argall and T. G. Ward

- South Australia won the toss and elected to bat.

18–21 December 1909
Scorecard

| New South Wales | v | South Australia (H) |
| 184 (45.2 overs); Gar Waddy 118; Jack Crawford 2/31 (11 overs) | | 397 (90.2 overs); Clem Hill 205; Leslie Minnett 5/90 (23.2 overs) |
| 209 (67.1 overs); Austin Diamond 47; Jack Crawford 6/59 (24.1 overs) |

South Australia won by an innings and 4 runs
Adelaide Oval, Adelaide
Umpires: F. J. C. Thomas and George Watson

- New South Wales won the toss and elected to bat.

27–29 December 1909
Scorecard

| New South Wales | v | Victoria (H) |
| 287 (83.2 overs); Warren Bardsley 78; Frank Laver 4/90 (26 overs) | | 93 (37 overs); Bill Sewart 26; Sid Emery 7/28 (12 overs) |
| 263 (92.5 overs); Warren Bardsley 149; Warwick Armstrong 4/44 (21.5 overs) | | 185 (42.1 overs); Warwick Armstrong 67; Sid Emery 5/85 (19.1 overs) |

New South Wales won by 272 runs
Melbourne Cricket Ground, Melbourne
Umpires: Bob Crockett and William Hannah

- New South Wales won the toss and elected to bat.

1–6 January 1910
Scorecard

| (H) Victoria | v | South Australia |
| 206 (50.5 overs); Vernon Ransford 37; Jack O'Connor 3/31 (13 overs) | | 360 (132.4 overs); Clem Hill 185; Jack Saunders 3/70 (28.4 overs) |
| 458 (111.2 overs); David Smith 146; Jack O'Connor 4/95 (28.2 overs) | | 223 (97.2 overs); Stanley Hill 58; Jack Saunders 5/69 (27.2 overs) |

Victoria won by 81 runs
Melbourne Cricket Ground, Melbourne
Umpires: Bob Crockett and E. Barrass

- Victoria won the toss and elected to bat.

8–11 January 1910
Scorecard

| (H) New South Wales | v | South Australia |
| 92 (32 overs); Gar Waddy 30; Bill Whitty 5/43 (16 overs) | | 207 (61.1 overs); Edgar Mayne 61; Sid Emery 5/55 (17.1 overs) |
| 289 (85 overs); Charlie Kelleway 108; Jack Crawford 7/92 (27 overs) | | 3/178 (52.3 overs); Jack Crawford 73*; Sid Emery 1/39 (14 overs) |

South Australia won by 7 wickets
Sydney Cricket Ground, Sydney
Umpires: William Bruton and William Curran

- New South Wales won the toss and elected to bat.

26–29 January 1910
Scorecard

| Victoria | v | New South Wales (H) |
| 180 (60.1 overs); Frederick Delves 57; Sid Emery 4/45 (18.1 overs) | | 161 (34.2 overs); Warren Bardsley 51; Jack Saunders 6/76 (13.2 overs) |
| 279 (78.3 overs); William Scott 81; John Scott 6/48 (16.3 overs) | | 4/299 (88.2 overs); Syd Gregory 169*; Warwick Armstrong 1/52 (30 overs) |

New South Wales won by 6 wickets
Sydney Cricket Ground, Sydney
Umpires: William Bruton and William Curran

- Victoria won the toss and elected to bat.

== Statistics ==
=== Most Runs ===
Clem Hill 609

=== Most Wickets ===
Sid Emery 23
