= 1910–11 Sheffield Shield season =

Australian cricket tournament

1910–11 Sheffield Shield
- Cricket format: First-class
- Tournament format: Double round-robin
- Champions: New South Wales (11th title)
- Participants: 3
- Matches: 5
- Most runs: Warren Bardsley (New South Wales) – 463 runs
- Most wickets: Warwick Armstrong (Victoria); Frank Laver (Victoria) – 17 wickets

The 1910–11 Sheffield Shield season was the 19th season of the Sheffield Shield, the domestic first-class cricket competition of Australia. New South Wales won the championship after being awarded the title with a better quotient. One fixture between South Australia and New South Wales was not held.

== Table ==
Team	Pld	W	L	D	Pts	Quot
New South Wales	3	2	1	0	1	1.181
South Australia	3	2	1	0	1	1.045
Victoria	4	1	3	0	-2	0.831

== Fixtures ==
28 October – 1 November 1910
Scorecard

Victoria	v	South Australia (H)
111 (34.1 overs); Warwick Armstrong 35; Jack Crawford 5/42 (15 overs)		220 (69 overs); Jack Crawford 79*; Gerry Hazlitt 3/74 (30 overs)
305 (99.3 overs); David Smith 96; Robert Rees 4/66 (16.3 overs)		4/202 (49.2 overs); Algy Gehrs 100*; Warwick Armstrong 3/68 (20 overs)

South Australia won by 6 wickets
Adelaide Oval, Adelaide
Umpires: A. McIntyre and George Watson

- South Australia won the toss and elected to field.

25–29 November 1910
Scorecard

South Australia	v	Victoria (H)
243 (72.2 overs); Jack Crawford 69; Warwick Armstrong 5/59 (22 overs)		614 (185.5 overs); William Scott 117; Bill Whitty 4/142 (53.5 overs)
284 (89.3 overs); Algy Gehrs 59; Arthur Kenny 5/49 (16.3 overs)

Victoria won by an innings and 87 runs
Melbourne Cricket Ground, Melbourne
Umpires: Bob Crockett and W. A. Young

- South Australia won the toss and elected to bat.

2–6 December 1910
Scorecard

South Australia	v	New South Wales (H)
342 (83 overs); Algy Gehrs 120; John Scott 4/48 (16 overs)		195 (61.1 overs); Victor Trumper 75; Albert Wright 5/75 (22.1 overs)
499 (104.2 overs); Clem Hill 156; Charlie Kelleway 6/72 (29.2 overs)		361 (100 overs); Warren Bardsley 191*; Albert Wright 6/101 (37 overs)

South Australia won by 285 runs
Sydney Cricket Ground, Sydney
Umpires: Alfred Jones and William Bruton

- New South Wales won the toss and elected to field.

24–28 December 1910
Scorecard

New South Wales	v	Victoria (H)
331 (101.3 overs); Warren Bardsley 124; Frank Laver 4/86 (36 overs)		252 (71.1 overs); Bert Kortlang 58; Tibby Cotter 4/60 (21.1 overs)
382 (141.1 overs); Victor Trumper 142; Frank Laver 4/83 (35.1 overs)		268 (70.3 overs); James Kyle 50; Tibby Cotter 4/85 (24 overs)

New South Wales won by 193 runs
Melbourne Cricket Ground, Melbourne
Umpires: Bob Crockett and Dave Elder

- Victoria won the toss and elected to field.

26–31 January 1911
Scorecard

(H) New South Wales	v	Victoria
337 (99 overs); Eric McElhone 101; Warwick Armstrong 3/55 (22 overs)		194 (66 overs); Bert Kortlang 41; H. V. Hordern 7/55 (25 overs)
401 (102.4 overs); Eric Barbour 113*; James Kyle 6/129 (33 overs)		88 (36.3 overs); Bert Kortlang 30; H. V. Hordern 6/32 (18 overs)

New South Wales won by 456 runs
Sydney Cricket Ground, Sydney
Umpires: Alfred Jones and William Curran

- New South Wales won the toss and elected to bat.

== Statistics ==
=== Most Runs ===
Warren Bardsley 463

=== Most Wickets ===
Warwick Armstrong & Frank Laver 17
