= 1911–12 Sheffield Shield season =

Australian cricket tournament

1911–12 Sheffield Shield
- Cricket format: First-class
- Tournament format: Double round-robin
- Champions: New South Wales (12th title)
- Participants: 3
- Matches: 6
- Most runs: Warwick Armstrong (Victoria) – 450 runs
- Most wickets: Tibby Cotter (New South Wales) – 28 wickets

The 1911–12 Sheffield Shield season was the 20th season of the Sheffield Shield, the domestic first-class cricket competition of Australia. New South Wales won the championship.

== Table ==
Team	Pld	W	L	D	Pts
New South Wales	4	4	0	0	4
Victoria	4	2	2	0	0
South Australia	4	0	4	0	-4

== Fixtures ==
3–7 November 1911
Scorecard

(H) South Australia	v	Victoria
305 (99.4 overs); Edgar Mayne 95; James Kyle 4/64 (30.4 overs)		265 (84 overs); Arnold Seitz 75; Jack Crawford 4/76 (21 overs)
296 (94.3 overs); Jack Crawford 126; Warwick Armstrong 4/76 (22.3 overs)		6/338 (91.4 overs); Arnold Seitz 107; Jack Crawford 3/81 (32 overs)

Victoria won by 4 wickets
Adelaide Oval, Adelaide
Umpires: A. T. Haddrick and George Watson

- South Australia won the toss and elected to bat.

24–28 November 1911
Scorecard

(H) Victoria	v	South Australia
553 (144.1 overs); Warwick Armstrong 250; Robert Rees 5/166 (38 overs)		232 (80.5 overs); Charlie Dolling 94; James Kyle 3/47 (27 overs)
		186 f/o (65.5 overs); Clem Hill 55; James Kyle 3/54 (26.5 overs)

Victoria won by an innings and 135 runs
Melbourne Cricket Ground, Melbourne
Umpires: Bob Crockett and William Hannah

- Victoria won the toss and elected to bat.

1–6 December 1911
Scorecard

(H) New South Wales	v	South Australia
316 (77.4 overs); Tibby Cotter 82; Robert Rees 4/94 (17 overs)		209 (59.4 overs); Clem Hill 59; Gerry Hazlitt 5/57 (20.4 overs)
352 (90.4 overs); Roy Minnett 87*; Bill Whitty 3/76 (23.4 overs)		98 (27.5 overs); Clem Hill 32*; Tibby Cotter 5/34 (14 overs)

New South Wales won by 361 runs
Sydney Cricket Ground, Sydney
Umpires: Alfred Jones and Walter French

- South Australia won the toss and elected to field.

23–27 December 1911
Scorecard

(H) Victoria	v	New South Wales
166 (62.2 overs); Warwick Armstrong 51; Tibby Cotter 4/38 (17 overs)		341 (98 overs); Charlie Kelleway 101; Jimmy Matthews 3/63 (22 overs)
217 (46.2 overs); Bert Kortlang 67; Tibby Cotter 6/86 (17.2 overs)		0/43 (6 overs); Charlie Macartney 28*

New South Wales won by 10 wickets
Melbourne Cricket Ground, Melbourne
Umpires: Dave Elder and William Bruton

- Victoria won the toss and elected to bat.

6–10 January 1912
Scorecard

(H) South Australia	v	New South Wales
261 (72.4 overs); Charlie Dolling 105; Tibby Cotter 4/67 (15.4 overs)		520 (144 overs); Warren Bardsley 177; Jack Crawford 6/141 (52 overs)
286 (72.2 overs); Charlie Dolling 66; Sid Emery 4/47 (18 overs)		2/28 (6 overs); Syd Gregory 13*; Bill Whitty 1/10 (3 overs)

New South Wales won by 8 wickets
Adelaide Oval, Adelaide
Umpires: F. J. C. Thomas and George Watson

- South Australia won the toss and elected to bat.

26–29 January 1912
Scorecard

Victoria	v	New South Wales (H)
129 (40.5 overs); Warwick Armstrong 51; Charlie Kelleway 3/18 (9 overs)		448 (85.4 overs); Roy Minnett 216*; Warwick Armstrong 5/104 (20 overs)
366 (96 overs); Colin McKenzie 121; Tibby Cotter 5/110 (27 overs)		3/50 (9 overs); Syd Gregory 18; Norman Brown 2/24 (4 overs)

New South Wales won by 7 wickets
Sydney Cricket Ground, Sydney
Umpires: Alfred Jones and Richard Callaway

- Victoria won the toss and elected to bat.

== Statistics ==
=== Most Runs ===
Warwick Armstrong 450

=== Most Wickets ===
Tibby Cotter 28
