= 1903–04 Sheffield Shield season =

Australian cricket tournament

1903–04 Sheffield Shield
- Cricket format: First-class
- Tournament format: Double round-robin
- Champions: New South Wales (6th title)
- Participants: 3
- Matches: 5
- Most runs: Reggie Duff (New South Wales) – 492 runs
- Most wickets: Bert Hopkins (New South Wales) – 21 wickets

The 1903–04 Sheffield Shield season was the 12th season of the Sheffield Shield, the domestic first-class cricket competition of Australia. New South Wales won the championship.

== Table ==
Team	Pld	W	L	D	Pts
New South Wales	4	3	1	0	2
Victoria	3	1	2	0	-1
South Australia	3	1	2	0	-1

== Fixtures ==
20–25 November 1903
Scorecard

South Australia	v	Victoria (H)
342 (128 overs); Clem Hill 147; Jack Saunders 4/110 (37 overs)		268 (117.5 overs); Frank Laver 79*; Robert Rees 6/80 (33.5 overs)
189 (78.1 overs); Algy Gehrs 48; Harry Trott 5/39 (16.1 overs)		246 (100.4 overs); Harry Trott 59; Robert Rees 4/61 (35.4 overs)

South Australia won by 17 runs
Melbourne Cricket Ground, Melbourne
Umpires: Bob Crockett and C. E. Over

- South Australia won the toss and elected to bat.

4–8 December 1903
Scorecard

(H) New South Wales	v	South Australia
681 (170 overs); Reggie Duff 271; Norman Claxton 4/115 (42 overs)		209 (90.3 overs); Clem Hill 85; Arthur McBeath 3/42 (24 overs)
		175 f/o (61.5 overs); Norman Claxton 54; Bert Hopkins 5/49 (20.5 overs)

New South Wales won by an innings and 297 runs
Sydney Cricket Ground, Sydney
Umpires: Alfred Jones and James Laing

- New South Wales won the toss and elected to bat.

19–23 December 1903
Scorecard

New South Wales	v	South Australia (H)
624 (151.4 overs); Syd Gregory 152; Norman Claxton 5/129 (36 overs)		338 (107.4 overs); Clem Hill 89; Monty Noble 5/67 (23.4 overs)
2/62 (18 overs); Wally Farquhar 29*; Joe Travers 1/2 (4 overs)		347 f/o (118.2 overs); Algy Gehrs 159; Bill Howell 4/64 (21.2 overs)

New South Wales won by 8 wickets
Adelaide Oval, Adelaide
Umpires: Philip Argall and T. A. Reeves

- New South Wales won the toss and elected to bat.

26–31 December 1903
Scorecard

(H) Victoria	v	New South Wales
312 (132.1 overs); Hugh Trumble 80; Monty Noble 4/68 (35 overs)		183 (50.5 overs); Victor Trumper 43; Charlie McLeod 7/34 (11.5 overs)
253 (113.4 overs); John Stuckey 81*; Bert Hopkins 5/70 (30 overs)		221 (66 overs); Victor Trumper 68; Harry Trott 4/34 (10 overs)

Victoria won by 161 runs
Melbourne Cricket Ground, Melbourne
Umpires: Bob Crockett and E. Barrass

- Victoria won the toss and elected to bat.

25–27 January 1904
Scorecard

Victoria	v	New South Wales (H)
163 (50.4 overs); Charlie McLeod 46; Albert Bowden 4/33 (16.4 overs)		389 (102.3 overs); Syd Gregory 81; Warwick Armstrong 3/10 (6.3 overs)
344 (117.5 overs); Peter McAlister 104; Bert Hopkins 5/96 (34 overs)		0/119 (22.3 overs); Reggie Duff 62*

New South Wales won by 10 wickets
Sydney Cricket Ground, Sydney
Umpires: Alfred Jones and Richard Callaway

- Victoria won the toss and elected to bat.

== Statistics ==
=== Most Runs ===
Reggie Duff 492

=== Most Wickets ===
Bert Hopkins 21
