= Ollivier =

Ollivier is a surname. Notable people with the surname include:

- Albert Ollivier (1915–1964), historian, writer, journalist, and politician
- Arthur Ollivier (1851–1897), New Zealand cricketer and mountaineer
- Charles-Prosper Ollivier d'Angers (1796–1845), French pathologist and clinician
- Clémence Ollivier (born 1984), French rugby union player
- Cloé Ollivier (born 2004), French short-track speed skater
- Démosthène Ollivier (1799–1884), French Republican politician
- Émile Ollivier (1825–1913), French politician and prime minister
- Émile Ollivier (writer) (1940–2002), Québécois writer
- Éric Ollivier (1926–2015), French writer
- Jean-Yves Ollivier (born 1944), French businessman and diplomat
- John Ollivier (1811–1893), 19th century Member of Parliament in Christchurch, New Zealand
- Jonathan Ollivier (1977–2015), British danseur
- Keith Ollivier (1880–1951), New Zealand cricketer
- Louis-François Ollivier (1770–1820), French Navy officer
- Michel-Barthélémy Ollivier (1712–1784), French painter and engraver
- Paul Ollivier (1876–1948), French actor
- Pierre Ollivier (born 1890), Belgian wrestler
- Valère Ollivier (1921–1958), Belgian road cyclist

== See also ==
- Jacques Cazotte aka Ollivier
- Mount Ollivier, New Zealand
