= Norman Dodds (cricketer) =

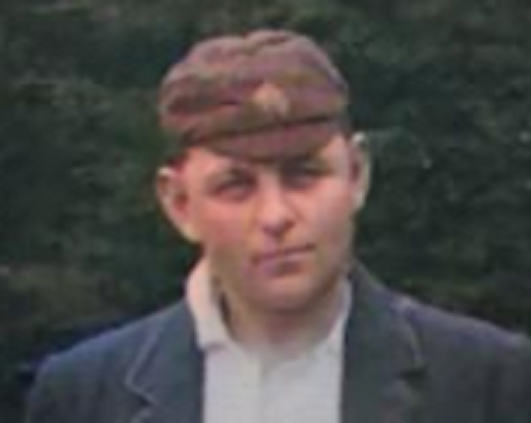

Personal information
- Born: 30 August 1876; Hobart, Tasmania, Australia
- Died: 15 December 1916 (aged 40); Hobart, Tasmania, Australia
- Nickname: Joker
- Batting: Right-handed
- Role: Wicketkeeper-batsman
- Relatives: Sir John Dodds (father)

Domestic team information
- Years: Team
- 1898-99 to 1907-08: Tasmania

Career statistics
Competition	First-class
Matches	16
Runs scored	610
Batting average	21.78
100s/50s	0/3
Top score	81
Balls bowled
Wickets	1
Bowling average	44.00
5 wickets in innings	0
10 wickets in match	0
Best bowling	1/34
Catches/stumpings	24/8
- Source: Cricinfo, 23 May 2015

Norman Dodds (30 August 1876 – 15 December 1916) was an Australian first-class cricketer. He played for Tasmania from 1899 to 1908, and toured New Zealand with an Australian XI, but did not play Test cricket.

== Early life ==
Dodds was the youngest of three sons of Sir John Dodds, who was Chief Justice and Lieutenant Governor of Tasmania. Norman Dodds was educated at Queen's College, Hobart, where he was prominent in the First XI.

== Cricket career ==
In his first innings on his first-class debut against Victoria in 1898-99 Dodds batted at number 11 and added 122 for the last wicket with William Ward, which is still the Tasmanian record for the last wicket. He played in most of Tasmania's matches for the next 10 seasons, keeping wickets and making useful runs and rising in the batting order. Against MCC in 1903-04, batting at number five, he top-scored with 48 ("a fine exhibition of forceful, plucky batting") in Tasmania's first innings of 141.

Dodds scored his first fifty when he made 81 and 27 against Victoria in 1907-08. In 1908-09 he was selected to play for an Australian XI against The Rest in Melbourne and made 80 not out in 66 minutes. The team for the tour of England in 1909 was due to be selected soon after the match. Harry Trott thought Dodds the best wicket-keeper in Australia, and the best batsman of the wicket-keepers. But after some discussion among the Australian selectors, and despite the vehement objections of one of them, Clem Hill, Barlow Carkeek was chosen ahead of Dodds as the deputy wicket-keeper.

Although he did not play in either of Tasmania's two first-class matches in 1909-10, Dodds was selected as the deputy wicket-keeper for Australia's tour of New Zealand at the end of the season. He played in three of the first-class matches and the three minor matches, but Charles Gorry kept wicket in the two matches against New Zealand. In the first match, against Wellington, Dodds played as a batsman and made a bright 53 in an opening partnership of 98 with Edgar Mayne. He played no further first-class cricket after the tour.

== Personal life ==
Dodds married Grace Hodgins in January 1903, and they had twins, a boy and a girl, in January 1906. He was appointed Secretary to Hobart's Metropolitan Drainage Board in 1906. He was forced to resign from the Board after a tense meeting on 19th April 1910 primarily addressing the Drainage Board accounts. Following the meeting he was arrested for, and later convicted of 'Indecent Language' in the street immediately afterwards. Following that tumultuous period, he was sent away from Hobart to take over the management of his father's estate, "Branxholm", near the town of Branxholm in northern Tasmania, arriving on the 1st July 1910. Following a 'severe' argument with Dodds at "Branxholm" Grace tragically died a few weeks later in Hobart at her fathers home in April 1912, having left Dodds to his mistress and future wife. Dodds later married his mistress, but died in Hobart 15th December 1916 from pneumonia. His second wife later gave birth to their son in April 1917.

== See also ==
- List of Tasmanian representative cricketers
