= Clive Single =

Australian cricketer

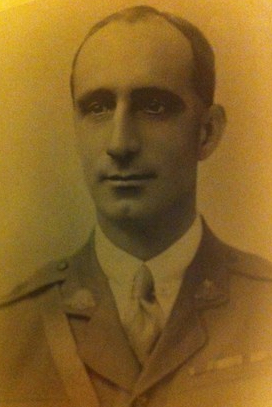

Personal information
- Full name: Clive Vallack Single
- Born: 17 September 1888; Penrith, New South Wales, Australia
- Died: 10 July 1931 (aged 42); Woollahra, New South Wales, Australia
- Source: Cricinfo, 1 February 2017

Clive Vallack Single, D.S.O., M.B., (Note: Note that, although a wide range of sources, including the University of Sydney's own "Book of Remembrance", state that Clive Vallack Single had attained Ch.M. (Master of Surgery), neither the University's official register of its 1913 graduates (see Calendar, p.517), nor the New South Wales Register of Medical Practitioners (see 1931, p.242) give any indication that any such qualification was awarded to Single in 1913, or at any other time.) (17 September 1888 – 10 July 1931) was an Australian cricketer, baseballer, soldier, and medical practitioner. He played two first-class matches for New South Wales in 1912, and three interstate baseball matches for New South Wales in 1911; and, having enlisted in December 1914, he served as a medical officer in the First AIF, in the Middle East, eventually reaching the rank of lieutenant-colonel — he was awarded a D.S.O. in 1919, and was twice Mentioned in Despatches.

"He was a decorated hero, a gifted sportsman, a dedicated doctor and a loving family man. A true gentleman, he inspired his team mates, his companions and his men to their best ideals." (Eric McElhone)

== Family ==
One of the six sons and two daughters of Henry Ernest Single (1855–1930), and Mary Judith Single, née Vallack (1858–1937), of "Wandoona", Wollar, near Mudgee, he was born in Burwood, on 17 September 1888. Several of his brothers were also talented cricketers: one of whom, Raymond Vallack Single (1917), was killed in action on 26 September 1917.

Clive married Verania "Rania" McPhillamy, O.B.E., M.B.E. (1899–1961), the eldest daughter of Charles Smith McPhillamy (1859–1935), and Alice Kay McPhillamy, née Halloran (1861–1938) – Verania had captained the Ascham cricket team whilst she was there as a boarding student in 1906 – at "Waroo", Forbes on 21 June 1920. Single's best man was Colonel B.V. Stacey, (1886–1971) C.M.G.

They had four children: a son, Clive Vallack Single (1924–1990), and three daughters, Rania Alice Vallack Murray, née Single (1921–1994), Denise May Vallack Lovell, née Single (1923–1975), and Ann (a.k.a. Polyann) Dewar, née Single (1927–1999).

== Education ==
Educated at Mudgee Grammar School, and, from 1908, at the University of Sydney, from whence he graduated M.B. in 1913.

== Baseball ==
At university, he played baseball, at first base, for several years, and also played first base for the New South Wales interstate team in all of its three games against Victoria in 1911.

== Cricket ==
Single, "who was looked upon as one of the greatest slip fielders in New South Wales", played cricket for the University of Sydney team, including two First Grade Premiership teams (in 1910/1911 and 1911/1912), receiving a "blue", for cricket, in 1912.

A talented cricketer with both bat and ball, he played in two Sheffield Shield matches for New South Wales, against Western Australia in November 1912.

Following his graduation from university, and prior to his enlistment in December 1914, he played for Glebe Cricket Club in the 1913/1914 and 1914/1915 seasons. After the war he played for Western Suburbs in the 1919/1920 season.

Once settled in Moree, he played impressive cricket for various local teams, and was routinely selected in the Moree Cricket Association's representative teams. In (perhaps) his last match at Moree, aged 37, he took 8 wickets for 28 runs; the match report noted that "the genial doctor … [its] chief attacking force … has been a tower of strength to [his representative team] … [and] in the three matches in which he has played [this season] he has taken 20 wickets for 75 runs — 6 for 17, 6 for 30, and 8 for 28."

== Military service ==
He enlisted for military service on 24 December 1914, and served in the Dardanelles in the Gallipoli Campaign, and in Egypt. On 23 March 1918, he was promoted to lieutenant-colonel, and placed in charge of the 4th Australian Light Horse Field Ambulance and served there, in Egypt, until he was demobilized in 1919. He was awarded a D.S.O in 1919, and was twice Mentioned in Despatches.

== Medical practice ==
Registered as a medical practitioner from 9 April 1913, immediately post-war, he moved to Moree and practised there from 1920 to 1926; and, then, following a family trip to England, he and his family settled in Woollahra in 1926, and he conducted his medical practice from rooms in Macquarie Street, Sydney until his death.

== See also ==
- List of New South Wales representative cricketers
