= David Patrick =

David Patrick may refer to:

- David Patrick (basketball) (born 1976), Australian basketball coach
- David Patrick (cricketer) (1886-1968), New Zealand cricketer
- David Patrick (sprinter) (born 1960), American hurdler
- David Patrick (writer) (1849–1914), Scottish writer and editor
