= James Kyle =

James Kyle is the name of:

- James Kyle (bishop) (1788–1869), Roman Catholic bishop who served as the first Vicar Apostolic of the Northern District of Scotland
- James Kyle (cricketer) (1879–1919), Australian cricketer
- James H. Kyle (1854–1901), American politician, United States Senator from South Dakota
- Jim Kyle (born 1950), American lawyer and politician
