= Alfred Clarke (Australian cricketer) =

Australian cricketer

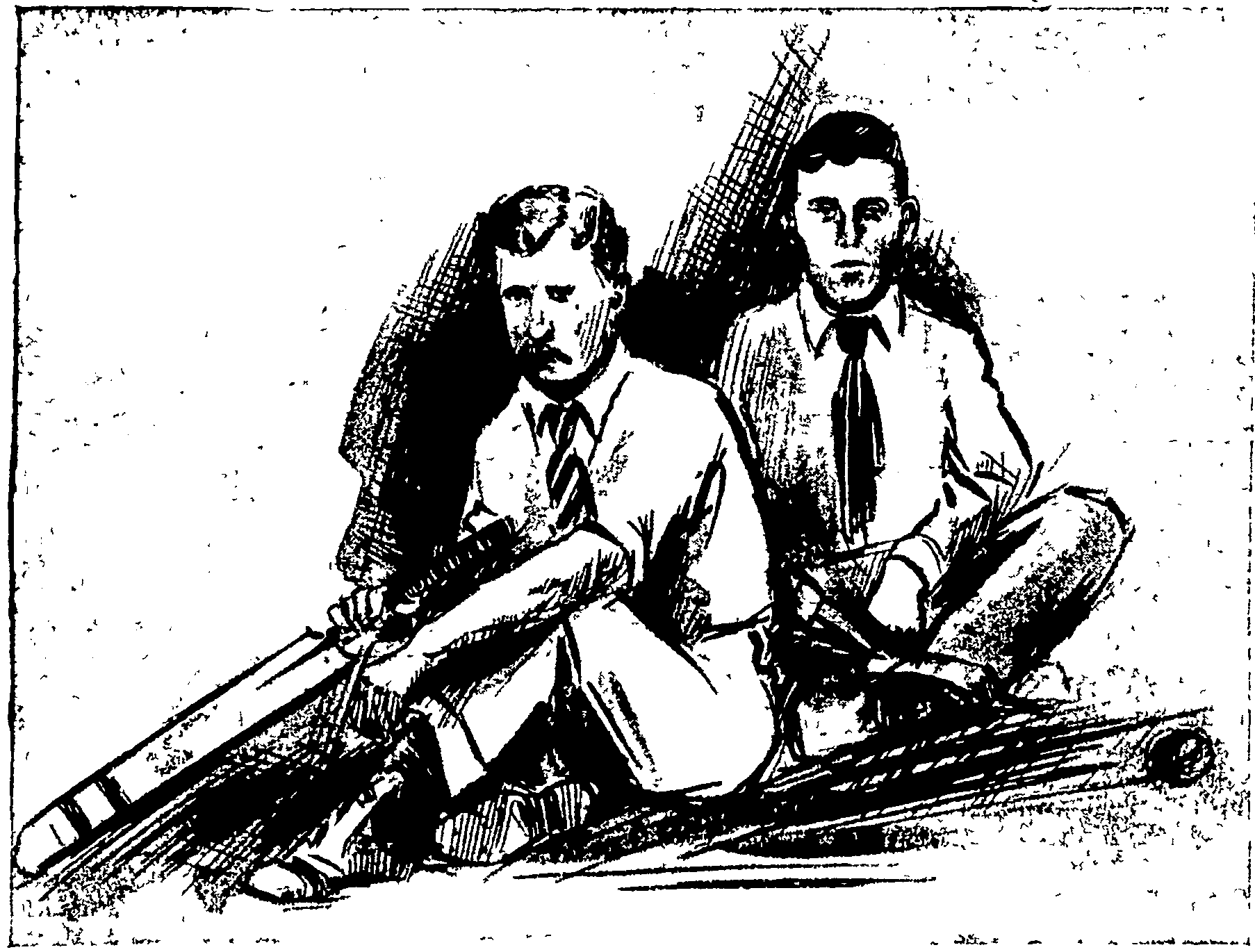
- Alfred Clarke (left) and Frederick Midlane, 1901

Personal information
- Full name: Alfred Edward Clarke
- Born: 6 April 1868; Surry Hills, Sydney, Australia
- Died: 16 September 1940 (aged 72); Wellington, New Zealand

Domestic team information
- Years: Team
- 1889/90–1891/92: New South Wales
- 1893/94–1898/99: Otago
- 1900/01–1901/02: Wellington

Career statistics
Competition	First-class
Matches	25
Runs scored	808
Batting average	18.79
100s/50s	0/2
Top score	76
Balls bowled	508
Wickets	14
Bowling average	15.92
5 wickets in innings	0
10 wickets in match	0
Best bowling	4/25
Catches/stumpings	12/–
- Source: ESPNcricinfo, 19 April 2019

Alfred Edward Clarke (6 April 1868 – 16 September 1940) was an Australian cricketer. He played first-class cricket for New South Wales in Australia from the 1889–90 season until 1891–92 and for Otago and Wellington in New Zealand from 1893–94 to 1901–02.

Clarke was born at Surry Hills in Australia in 1868. After moving to New Zealand in the early 1890s he played for the national team in the years before it was granted Test status. He also umpired a first-class match in New Zealand. He died at Wellington in 1940.
