= International cricket in 1920–21 =

International cricket season

The 1920–21 international cricket season was from September 1920 to April 1921.

== Season overview ==
International tours
Start date	Home team	Away team	Results [Matches]			
Start date	Home team	Away team	Test	ODI	FC	LA
17 December 1920	Australia	England	5–0 [5]	—	—	—
1 April 1921	New Zealand	Australia	—	—	0–1 [2]	—

== December ==
=== England in Australia ===
The Ashes Test Series
No.	Date	Home captain	Away captain	Venue	Result
Test 135	17–22 December	Warwick Armstrong	Johnny Douglas	Sydney Cricket Ground, Sydney	Australia by 377 runs
Test 136	31 Dec–4 January	Warwick Armstrong	Johnny Douglas	Melbourne Cricket Ground, Melbourne	Australia by an innings and 91 runs
Test 137	14–20 January	Warwick Armstrong	Johnny Douglas	Adelaide Oval, Adelaide	Australia by 119 runs
Test 138	11–16 February	Warwick Armstrong	Johnny Douglas	Melbourne Cricket Ground, Melbourne	Australia by 8 wickets
Test 139	25 Feb–1 March	Warwick Armstrong	Johnny Douglas	Sydney Cricket Ground, Sydney	Australia by 9 wickets

== April ==
=== Australia in New Zealand ===
First-class series
No.	Date	Home captain	Away captain	Venue	Result
Match 1	26–29 March	Stan Brice	Vernon Ransford	Basin Reserve, Wellington	Match drawn
Match 2	1–4 April	Stan Brice	Vernon Ransford	Eden Park, Auckland	Australia by an innings and 227 runs
