= Ashley Facy =

Australian cricketer

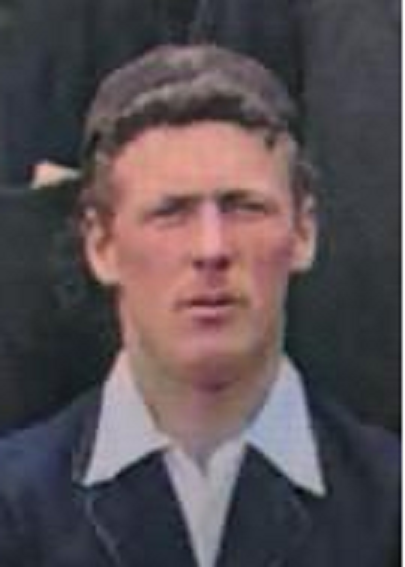

Personal information
- Full name: Ashley Cooper Facy
- Born: 26 January 1886; Bellerive, Tasmania, Australia
- Died: 2 December 1954 (aged 68); Hobart, Tasmania
- Batting: Right-handed
- Bowling: Right-arm fast

Domestic team information
- Years: Team
- 1908-09 to 1909-10, 1922-23: Tasmania
- 1910-11 to 1912-13: Victoria

Career statistics
Competition	First-class
Matches	12
Runs scored	364
Batting average	21.41
100s/50s	0/3
Top score	77
Balls bowled	2324
Wickets	47
Bowling average	27.17
5 wickets in innings	3
10 wickets in match	1
Best bowling	7/71
Catches/stumpings	2/0
- Source: Cricket Archive, 22 May 2015

Ashley Cooper Facy (26 January 1886 – 2 December 1954) was an Australian cricketer who played first-class cricket from 1909 to 1923. He toured New Zealand with the Australian team in 1909-10 but did not play Test cricket.

== Early life and career ==
Ashley Facy was one of eight children, all boys. His father, Peter Facy, an accountant and auditor, and a municipal councillor in New Town, was the secretary of the Tasmanian Cricket Association for over 20 years.

Facy was a fast bowler and useful lower-order batsman. On his debut in the biannual intrastate match in 1907-08 at the TCA Ground in Hobart he took 6 for 37 in the second innings to help South win by an innings and 186 runs. At stumps on the second day North were 5 for 12, Facy having taken four wickets. The Launceston Daily Telegraph commended his "graceful delivery for an express bowler" and suggested he might play for Australia "not too many years hence". The Hobart Mercury declared that "Facy's entry into North and South cricket was well-nigh triumphal". In the match in 1909-10 at the NTCA Ground in Launceston, when North needed 150 to win he bowled unchanged through the innings and took 8 for 58 off 28 overs, bowling seven of his victims and taking a hat-trick, and South won by 16 runs.

== First-class career ==
Facy made his first-class debut in 1908-09 for Tasmania against Victoria in Hobart, bowling 67.1 overs – more than anyone else in the match – and taking 10 wickets for 226. After one more match against Victoria he was selected to play for The Rest against New South Wales in a benefit match for Charles Turner in January 1910. He bowled Monty Noble first ball, sending one of the bails 47 yards from the stumps. He took three wickets in the match and made 21 not out and 44. Immediately after the match he was included in the Australian team to tour New Zealand at the end of the season.

Before the tour, The New Zealand Herald noted that he was accurate for a fast bowler and took an unusually short run-up for a bowler of his pace. After the tour the Free Lance called his pace "lightning", noting that he was faster than New Zealand batsmen were accustomed to facing.

In the two-day match against a Taranaki 15, Facy took 8 for 31 in the first innings, all bowled, and caused another batsman to retire hurt with a broken finger. He did not play in the first of the two matches against New Zealand, but in the second he took 7 for 71 in the first innings, bowling with good length and direction and use of the yorker. Six of his victims were bowled. Dan Reese, the New Zealand captain, later recalled that few of the New Zealand batsmen were able to handle his pace and lift.

He moved to Melbourne in 1910. In October, in his first match for South Melbourne, he yorked the Melbourne opening batsman Frederick Vaughan with the first ball of the match, breaking the middle stump in two, and took five wickets, all bowled, including Vernon Ransford, victim of another yorker. He was immediately selected to play for Victoria, but in his first match, against the touring South Africans in November, he injured his shoulder. A few weeks later in December he suffered a severe attack of rheumatism and spent time in hospital. He not only missed the rest of the season, but was never quite the same bowler thereafter.

Facy returned to cricket in 1911-12 and continued to play for South Melbourne until 1915. He played three more matches for Victoria, two of them against Tasmania. In the first, batting at number 10, he went to the wicket with the score at 8 for 61 and made 74, adding 146 for the ninth wicket with Tom Warne. Against Western Australia in 1912-13 he took six wickets and made 77, his highest first-class score.

He returned to Tasmania and played one final match for the state in 1922-23, still opening the bowling at the age of 36. Victoria made a world record score of 1059, and Facy took 2 for 228 off 38 eight-ball overs.

== Later life ==
In 1915, living in Melbourne, his profession was listed as "meter reader". In 1926 he was granted a liquor licence for the yacht club at Bellerive, Hobart. In 1931, described as a "storekeeper of Bellerive", he faced bankruptcy proceedings.

He and his wife Ada had a son and a daughter. When he died in 1954 his age was given as 64.

== See also ==
- List of Victoria first-class cricketers
- List of Tasmanian representative cricketers
