= McElhone =

McElhone is a surname. Notable people with the surname include:

- Arthur McElhone (1868–1946), Australian politician
- Eloise McElhone (1920/1921-1974), American radio and television personality
- Eric McElhone (1887–1981), Australian cricketer
- Frank McElhone (1929–1982), Scottish politician
- Helen McElhone (1933–2013), Scottish politician
- Jack McElhone (born 1993), Scottish actor
- John McElhone (1833–1898), Australian politician
- Johnny McElhone (born 1963), Scottish guitarist and songwriter
- Natascha McElhone (born 1969), English actress

== See also ==
- MacElhone
