= Charles Simpson (cricketer) =

Australian cricketer

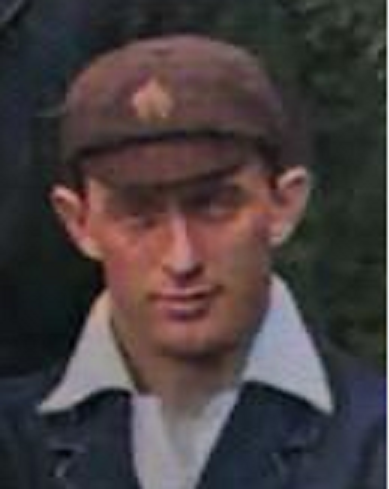

Personal information
- Full name: Charles Edward Simpson
- Born: 27 March 1882; Parramatta, New South Wales, Australia
- Died: 26 June 1956 (aged 74); Sydney, New South Wales, Australia
- Batting: Right-handed
- Bowling: Right-arm off-spin

Domestic team information
- Years: Team
- 1906-07 to 1908-09: Queensland
- 1909-10 to 1910-11: New South Wales

Career statistics
Competition	First-class
Matches	15
Runs scored	719
Batting average	27.65
100s/50s	1/5
Top score	102
Balls bowled	1109
Wickets	18
Bowling average	31.44
5 wickets in innings	1
10 wickets in match	0
Best bowling	5/50
Catches/stumpings	15/0
- Source: Cricinfo, 6 May 2020

Charles Edward Simpson (27 March 1882 – 26 June 1956) was an Australian cricketer. He played first-class cricket for Queensland and New South Wales between 1906 and 1910.

Charles Simpson showed promise in the five matches he played for Queensland in three seasons, and was selected in three matches for The Rest (of Australia): two against the Australian Test team and one against New South Wales. In the one against New South Wales in January 1910 he opened the batting and scored 102 in the second innings in 102 minutes, putting on 167 for the first wicket with Edgar Mayne. He was selected a few days later in the Australian team that toured New Zealand at the end of the season, and played in five first-class matches on the tour, including one of the two against New Zealand.

== See also ==
- List of New South Wales representative cricketers
