= Australian cricket team in New Zealand and Fiji in 1904–05 =

International cricket tour

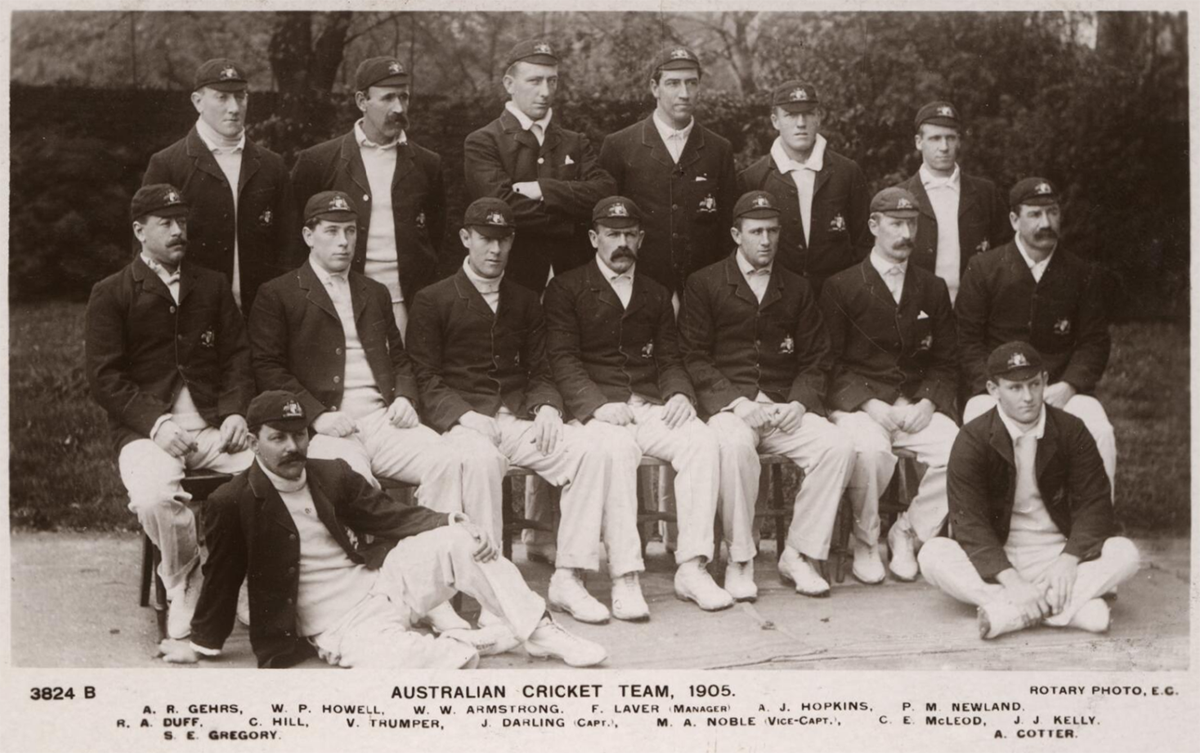
The Australian team that toured England in 1905. The same team toured New Zealand, except for Joe Darling (seated centre).

An Australian team toured New Zealand and Fiji from February to April 1905 to play four first-class matches including two against New Zealand, which had not then attained Test status. Although it was the fifth Australian team to tour New Zealand, it was the first one to play matches on even terms, which therefore have first-class status. On previous tours all matches had been against teams of 15, 18 or 22 players. As well as the two matches against New Zealand, the Australians played first-class matches against Canterbury and Otago. The other games were non-first-class against Auckland, Wellington and Fiji.

The Australian team was captained by Monty Noble and included several notable Test players such as Warwick Armstrong, Tibby Cotter, Clem Hill and Victor Trumper. After they left Fiji they proceeded on to their tour of England. Joe Darling, who captained the team once it arrived in England, was unavailable for the tour of New Zealand and Fiji.

The Australians won the matches against Auckland, Canterbury and Otago and drew against Wellington. They were held to a draw in the first match against New Zealand, but they won the second match by an innings and 358 runs.

== The team ==
- Monty Noble (captain)
- Clem Hill (vice-captain)
- Warwick Armstrong
- Tibby Cotter
- Reggie Duff
- Algy Gehrs
- Syd Gregory
- Bert Hopkins
- Bill Howell
- Jim Kelly
- Frank Laver
- Charlie McLeod
- Phil Newland
- Victor Trumper

Laver was the player-manager, assisted by Newland.

== The matches ==
First-class matches are indicated in bold.

- Auckland v Australians, Auckland Domain, Auckland, 10, 11, 13 February 1905. Auckland XV 175 and 107; Australians 442. Australians won by an innings and 160 runs.
- Wellington v Australians, Basin Reserve, Wellington, 20, 21, 22 February 1905. Wellington XV 183 and 213 for 9; Australians 433. Drawn.
- **Canterbury v Australians**, Lancaster Park, Christchurch, 24, 25, 27 February 1905. Canterbury 119 and 183; Australians 166 and 137 for 2. Australians won by eight wickets.

After delays caused by rain, the Australians needed 137 to win in one hour, on a wet pitch. Trumper hit 87 not out, giving the Australians victory off 18 overs with one minute to spare. His innings was described some years later as "almost universally recognised as the finest innings that has ever been seen in New Zealand".

- **Otago v Australians**, Carisbrook, Dunedin, 3, 4 March 1905. Otago 55 and 76; Australians 304. Australians won by an innings and 173 runs.
- **New Zealand v Australia**, Lancaster Park, Christchurch, 10, 11, 13 March 1905. Australia 533; New Zealand 138 and 112 for 7. Drawn.

Armstrong made 126 not out and took 5 for 27 and 5 for 25. Hill made 118, Trumper 84. For New Zealand, Keith Ollivier took 5 for 113 and top-scored in each innings with 39 and 32 not out. Rain delayed the start of play on the final day.

- **New Zealand v Australia**, Basin Reserve, Wellington, 16, 17, 18 March 1905. New Zealand 94 and 141; Australia 593 for 9 dec. Australia won by an innings and 358 runs.

Trumper made 172, Hill 129. Together they added 269 in 110 minutes for the sixth wicket. Armstrong made 67 not out and took 6 for 51 in the second innings. The former Australian Test batsman and Test umpire Charles Bannerman umpired both matches in partnership with a local umpire.

The former Australian Test players Sydney Callaway and Harry Graham, both of whom had moved to New Zealand in recent years, represented New Zealand in both matches. The New Zealand captain was Arthur Sims, who later organised and captained the Australian team that toured New Zealand in 1913-14. When Sims was injured and had to leave the field during the second match, Graham acted as captain.

- Fiji v Australians, Albert Park, Suva, 27 March 1905. Fiji XVIII 91; Australians 212.

Howell took 5 for 6. The top-scorer was Hopkins with 54.

== Leading players ==
Trumper was the highest scorer in the four first-class matches, with 436 runs at an average of 109.00. Hill scored 308 runs at 77.00, and Armstrong 254 at 127.00. Armstrong was the leading wicket-taker, with 21 wickets at an average of 6.90. Cotter took 15 wickets at 9.20, and Noble 15 at 12.20.

Among the New Zealanders, the highest first-class score was 49 by James Lawrence for Canterbury. The best bowling figures were 5 for 84 by Joe Bennett, also in the Canterbury match.
