= Keith Ollivier =

New Zealand cricketer

Personal information
- Full name: Keith Morton Ollivier
- Born: 2 August 1880; Christchurch, New Zealand
- Died: 12 September 1951 (aged 71); Merivale, Christchurch, New Zealand
- Batting: Right-handed
- Bowling: Right-arm leg-spin
- Relatives: Arthur Ollivier (father); John Ollivier (grandfather)

Domestic team information
- Years: Team
- 1900–01 to 1911–12: Canterbury

Career statistics
Competition	First-class
Matches	24
Runs scored	928
Batting average	22.09
100s/50s	0/3
Top score	83
Balls bowled	1077
Wickets	35
Bowling average	19.94
5 wickets in innings	3
10 wickets in match	1
Best bowling	6/43
Catches/stumpings	21/–
- Source: CricketArchive, 22 May 2018

Keith Morton Ollivier (2 August 1880 – 12 September 1951) was a New Zealand cricketer who played first-class cricket for Canterbury from 1901 to 1912. He played twice for New Zealand in the days before New Zealand played Test cricket.

== Personal life ==
Ollivier's middle name was the maiden name of his grandmother, Elizabeth Morton. His grandfather was John Ollivier, a politician and local Christchurch identity. His father was Arthur Ollivier, a noted Christchurch businessman, cricketer and mountaineer.

Keith Ollivier was educated at Christ's College, Christchurch. He spent his working life with the Bank of New Zealand, working in several branches around New Zealand and spending ten years as a bank inspector before retiring. In Wellington, in 1912, he married Hilda von Dadelszen, daughter of the New Zealand public administrator Edward John von Dadelszen. They had one son. She died in 1937. He remarried, and was survived by his second wife, Vida, when he died at his home in the Christchurch suburb of Merivale in September 1951.

== Cricket career ==
Ollivier was the leading New Zealand batsman in the 1903–04 first-class season, with 306 runs in four matches at an average of 51.00. His 83 batting at number five in Canterbury’s 244-run victory over Wellington was the equal-highest first-class score for the season. He was chosen in the inaugural match between North Island and South Island at the end of the season and, opening the batting for South Island, impressed observers by scoring 48 and 22 in South Island's two-wicket victory.

When Australia toured New Zealand in 1904–05, Ollivier was the only New Zealander to perform well in the two-match series between the two sides. In the first match, he took 5 for 113 with his leg-breaks in Australia's only innings, and top-scored in each innings for New Zealand with 39 and 32 not out to help New Zealand hold on for a draw. He was less effective in the second match, which Australia won by an innings and 358 runs, although his 16 was equal-top score in the first innings.

In later seasons Ollivier was more effective as a bowler. In Canterbury's victory over Wellington in 1906–07, playing in place of the unavailable Sydney Callaway, he opened the bowling with Joseph Bennett and took 6 for 43 and 5 for 66 with his leg-spin, varying his pace cleverly. Earlier in the season he had made 78, the top score in the match, and taken three wickets, when Canterbury defeated the touring MCC team. It was these two victories that led to Canterbury being awarded the inaugural Plunket Shield at the end of the season.
