= Frederick Delves =

Australian cricketer

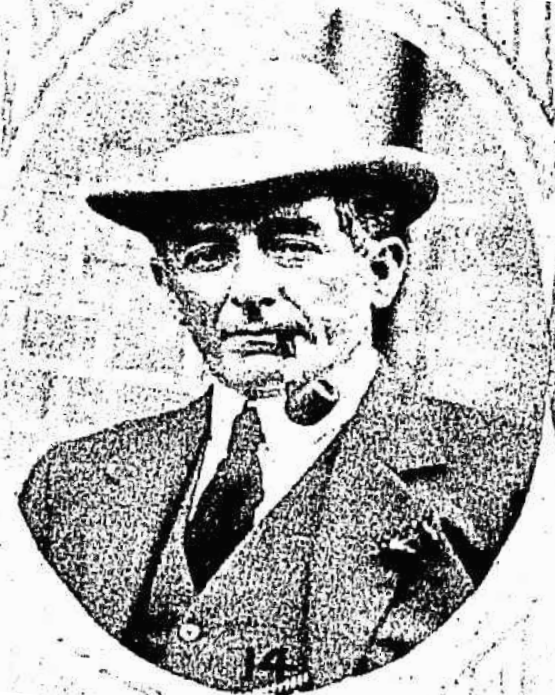

Personal information
- Born: 23 August 1876; Melbourne, Australia
- Died: 28 July 1944 (aged 67); Melbourne, Australia

Domestic team information
- Years: Team
- 1908-1911: Victoria
- Source: Cricinfo, 15 November 2015

Frederick Delves (23 August 1876 – 28 July 1944) was an Australian cricketer. He played ten first-class cricket matches for Victoria between 1908 and 1911.

== See also ==
- List of Victoria first-class cricketers
