= Arthur Kenny =

Australian cricketer

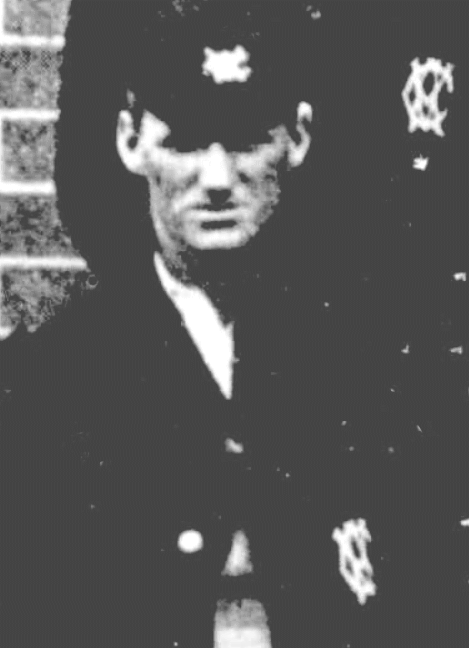

Personal information
- Born: 9 August 1878; Melbourne, Australia
- Died: 2 August 1934 (aged 55); Melbourne, Australia

Domestic team information
- Years: Team
- 1910-1911: Victoria
- Source: Cricinfo, 15 November 2015

Arthur Kenny (9 August 1878 – 2 August 1934) was an Australian cricketer. He played twelve first-class cricket matches for Victoria between 1910 and 1911. He also played for South Melbourne Cricket Club.

== See also ==
- List of Victoria first-class cricketers
