= Charles Gorry =

Australian cricketer

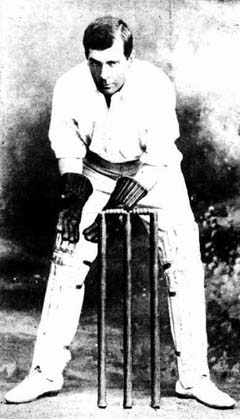

Personal information
- Full name: Charles Richard Gorry
- Born: 18 September 1878; Auckland, New Zealand
- Died: 13 September 1950 (aged 71); Sydney, Australia
- Height: 5 ft 9 in (1.75 m)
- Role: Wicketkeeper

Domestic team information
- Years: Team
- 1907/08–1910/11: New South Wales

Career statistics
Competition	First-class
Matches	19
Runs scored	143
Batting average	7.94
100s/50s	0/0
Top score	16
Catches/stumpings	29/16
- Source: Cricinfo, 7 June 2023

Charles Richard Gorry (18 September 1878 – 13 September 1950) was an Australian cricketer. He played first-class cricket as a wicket-keeper for New South Wales from 1907/08 to 1910/11.

Gorry was born in Auckland, but his family moved to Australia a few weeks later. He represented Glebe in the Sydney senior cricket competition. When the Australian team to England in 1909 was selected, his two Glebe teammates Warren Bardsley and Tibby Cotter, who were both selected, expressed their displeasure that Gorry had not also been chosen. Gorry was selected as the main wicketkeeper for the Australian tour of New Zealand in 1909–10, and played in the two matches against New Zealand.

Gorry worked for the Union Steam Ship Company in Sydney and lived in the suburb of Petersham. He died at Marrickville Hospital in September 1950.

== See also ==
- List of New South Wales representative cricketers
