= Harry Siedeberg =

New Zealand cricketer (1877–1945)

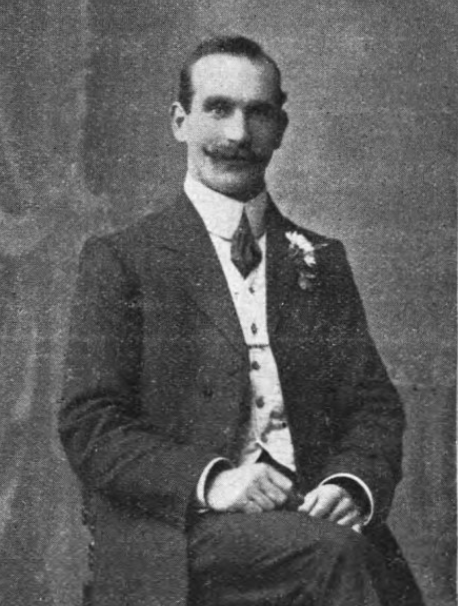
- Siedeberg in 1913

Personal information
- Full name: Henry George Siedeberg
- Born: 13 July 1877; Dunedin, New Zealand
- Died: 21 May 1945 (aged 67); Dunedin, New Zealand
- Batting: Right-handed
- Relatives: Emily Siedeberg (sister)

Domestic team information
- Years: Team
- 1898/99–1921/22: Otago

Career statistics
Competition	First-class
Matches	46
Runs scored	1,420
Batting average	17.31
100s/50s	0/5
Top score	90
Balls bowled	999
Wickets	26
Bowling average	21.84
5 wickets in innings	1
10 wickets in match	1
Best bowling	6/30
Catches/stumpings	22/–
- Source: Cricinfo, 12 May 2015

Henry George Siedeberg (13 July 1877 – 21 May 1945) was a New Zealand cricketer who represented the national side and was several times the national billiards champion.

== Early life and family ==
Harry Siedeberg was one of several children of Franz Siedeberg, a German-Jewish architect who had migrated to New Zealand in the 1860s, and his Irish wife Anna. Harry's elder sister Emily was the first New Zealand woman to graduate in medicine. Harry attended Otago Boys' High School in Dunedin.

He married Florence McConnochie in St Stephen's Church in Dunedin on 22 November 1911.

== Cricket career ==
Siedeberg played for the Carisbrook and Albion cricket clubs in Dunedin. "He has any amount of patience, and he possesses a strong defence," the Otago Witness declared in 1898.

He made his first-class debut for Otago in 1899–1900 and played several matches as an opening batsman and occasional slow bowler without distinction until 1902–03, when he was Otago's top-scorer in an innings defeat to the touring English team Lord Hawke's XI, making 21 and 52.

His next fifty was in the first match of the 1904–05 season, when he made 88, the highest score on either side in Otago's innings victory over Wellington. His innings took two and a quarter hours and was marked by powerful driving. It was the highest score by a New Zealand batsman in 1904–05. He also top-scored for Otago in their next match, making 40 in a low-scoring loss to Canterbury. He was selected in both of New Zealand's matches against the touring Australians later in the season, but along with all his team-mates he failed with the bat and Australia won easily each time.

Siedeberg made his highest first-class score in the first match of the 1905–06 season, when he made 28 and 90 in a victory over Canterbury. He batted two and three-quarter hours for his 90, and added now to his powerful driving was a "stroke he picked up from that master batsman Trumper, swinging at a ball pitched on the off, and getting it away to leg", which brought him several boundaries. Once again he made the highest score of the match. In March 1906 he made Otago's first century against a touring team when he scored 102 against Melbourne Cricket Club in a three-day non-first-class match.

He batted in the middle order from 1906–07. He broke the record for the highest score in senior Dunedin cricket in January 1907 when he scored 223 not out. He appeared once for New Zealand against MCC in 1906–07, and twice against Australia in 1909–10, but with little success. In 1914–15 he took 10 wickets in the match (4 for 22 and 6 for 30) as he and Jack Crawford dismissed Southland twice on the third day after the second day had been lost to rain.

He played his last matches for Otago in 1921–22 at the age of 44.

== Other sports ==
Siedeberg was the New Zealand Billiards Champion in 1916, 1917, 1919 and 1921. He held the world amateur losing hazards record break of 667, and made more breaks of 100 to 600 than any other amateur in the British Empire. He was forced to give up the game when his eyesight weakened. He was later President of the New Zealand Billiards Control Association.

He also played soccer and hockey for Otago, played rugby union in Dunedin, and was proficient in gymnastics and athletics. In later years he took up bowls, and in 1926 he was a member of the New Zealand champion four.

== Work ==
Siedeberg worked for the Victoria Insurance Company and the Queensland Insurance Company before establishing his own business as a financial agent.

== Death ==
After a period of ill-health, Siedeberg died suddenly in Dunedin on 21 May 1945, aged 67. His wife and their married daughter survived him.
