= Albert Bowden =

Australian cricketer

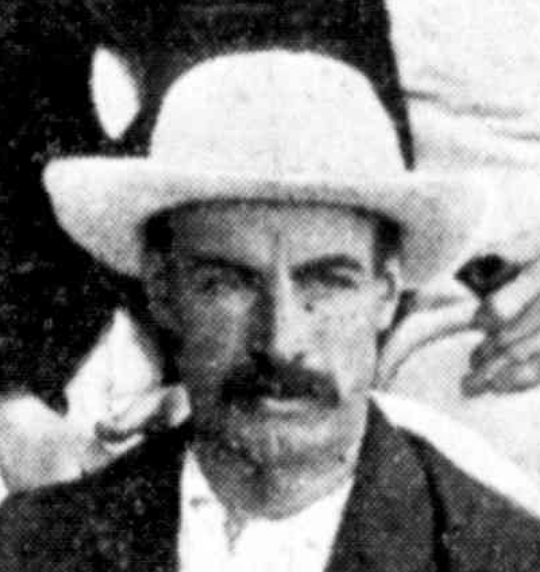

Personal information
- Born: 28 September 1874; Sydney, Australia
- Died: 8 August 1943 (aged 68); Northwood, New South Wales, Australia
- Source: ESPNcricinfo, 23 December 2016

Albert Bowden (28 September 1874 – 8 August 1943) was an Australian cricketer. He played eleven first-class matches for New South Wales between 1899/1900 and 1907/08. He also played for Glebe District Club.

== See also ==
- List of New South Wales representative cricketers
