= Arnold Seitz =

Australian cricketer and educationist

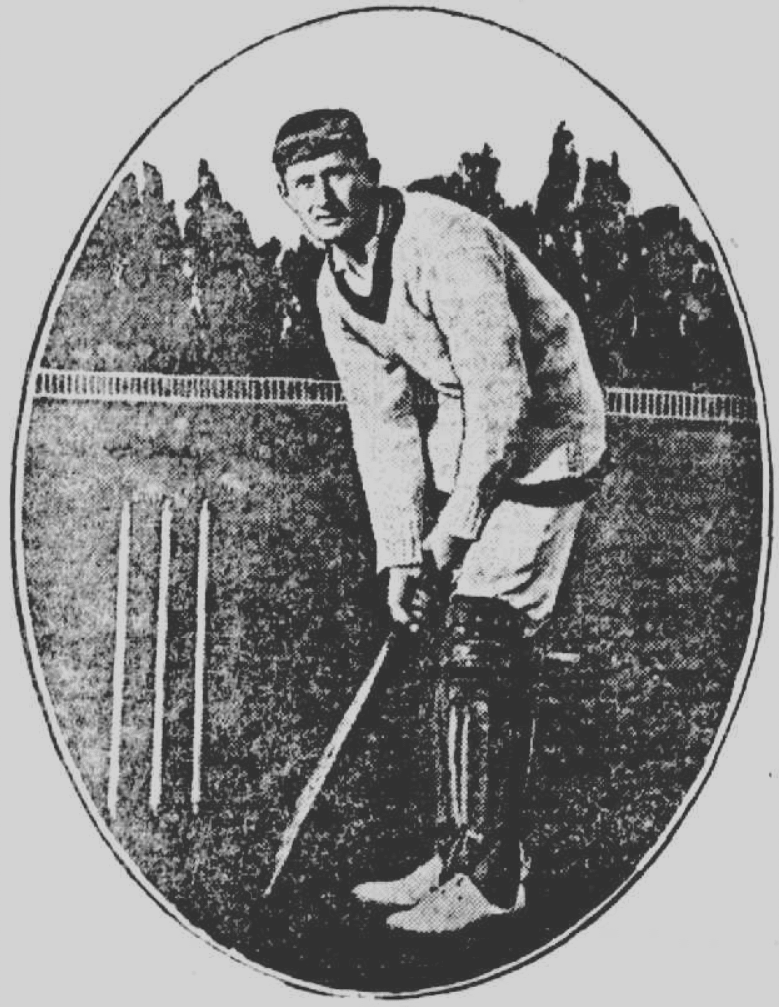

Personal information
- Full name: John Arnold Seitz
- Born: 19 September 1883; Melbourne, Australia
- Died: 1 May 1963 (aged 79); Melbourne, Australia

Domestic team information
- Years: Team
- 1909: Oxford University
- 1910 to 1913: Victoria

Career statistics
Competition	First-class
Matches	20
Runs scored	981
Batting average	28.85
100s/50s	3/3
Top score	120
Balls bowled	20
Wickets	1
Bowling average	12.00
5 wickets in innings	0
10 wickets in match	0
Best bowling	1/7
Catches/stumpings	18/0
- Source: Cricinfo, 17 November 2015

John Arnold Seitz CMG (19 September 1883 – 1 May 1963) was an Australian cricketer and educationist. He played ten first-class cricket matches for Victoria from 1910–11 to 1912–13. He also played for Oxford University in 1909.

== See also ==
- List of Victoria first-class cricketers
- List of Oxford University Cricket Club players
