= Alf Hadden =

New Zealand cricketer (1877–1936)

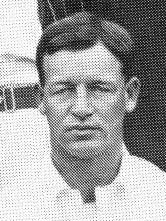
- Alf Hadden in 1910

Personal information
- Full name: Alfred Ernest Hadden
- Born: 1877; Sydney, Australia
- Died: 25 December 1936 (age 58); Auckland, New Zealand
- Batting: Right-handed

Domestic team information
- Years: Team
- 1905/06–1910/11: Auckland

Career statistics
Competition	First-class
Matches	20
Runs scored	986
Batting average	29.87
100s/50s	0/10
Top score	84
Balls bowled	1245
Wickets	25
Bowling average	25.20
5 wickets in innings	1
10 wickets in match	0
Best bowling	5/65
Catches/stumpings	6/–
- Source: CricketArchive, 14 October 2014

Alfred Ernest Hadden (often spelt Haddon) (1877 – 23 December 1936) was a cricketer who played first-class cricket for Auckland from 1906 to 1911, and played for New Zealand in the days before New Zealand played Test cricket.

== Cricket career ==
Alf Hadden was born in Sydney and played cricket for North Sydney before moving to Auckland in late 1904, as the professional coach and groundsman for the North Shore team in the Auckland competition.

He made his first-class debut for Auckland against Otago in 1905–06, scoring 60 (second-top score) and 64 (top score) in a losing side. He finished the season with 281 runs at an average of 40.14.

In 1906-07 he played in both matches New Zealand played against the touring MCC. New Zealand lost the first. In the second match, on a difficult pitch against hostile fast bowling by Johnny Douglas and Percy May, Hadden scored 71 in the second innings after New Zealand had been 33 for 3. The Auckland Star said it was "an exhibition of batting in which splendid defence, punctuated with free punishing powers, predominated ... [he] made several clinking carpet drives, which found the boundary". Percy May said Hadden's innings was the "finest recorded against us during the whole tour. His driving, cutting and hooking were equally skilful". New Zealand won by 56 runs.

Hadden captained Auckland in several matches from 1906–07 to 1908–09, leading the team to victory in the first-ever match in the Plunket Shield in 1907–08, and to the retention of the Shield in 1908–09. In 1910-11 he scored 219 runs at 42.38 and took 6 wickets at 21.33 in three matches, and made his highest score of 84, the top score in the match, against Hawke's Bay.

== Personal life ==
A prison sentence ended Hadden's cricket career. In July 1911, while working as a tally clerk at the Auckland wharves, he was arrested after a series of cargo thefts at the wharves. At the trial it was argued in his defence that Hadden was a man of good character whose "only failing was drink", and that his accomplices had taken advantage of this weakness. In September he was sentenced to two years' jail. One of his accomplices received a nine-month sentence, and the other eight years.

He served overseas as a private in the New Zealand Expeditionary Force in World War I. He was gassed near Messines in 1917 and spent some months recovering in England before returning to New Zealand.
