= Arthur Ollivier =

New Zealand cricketer and mountaineer

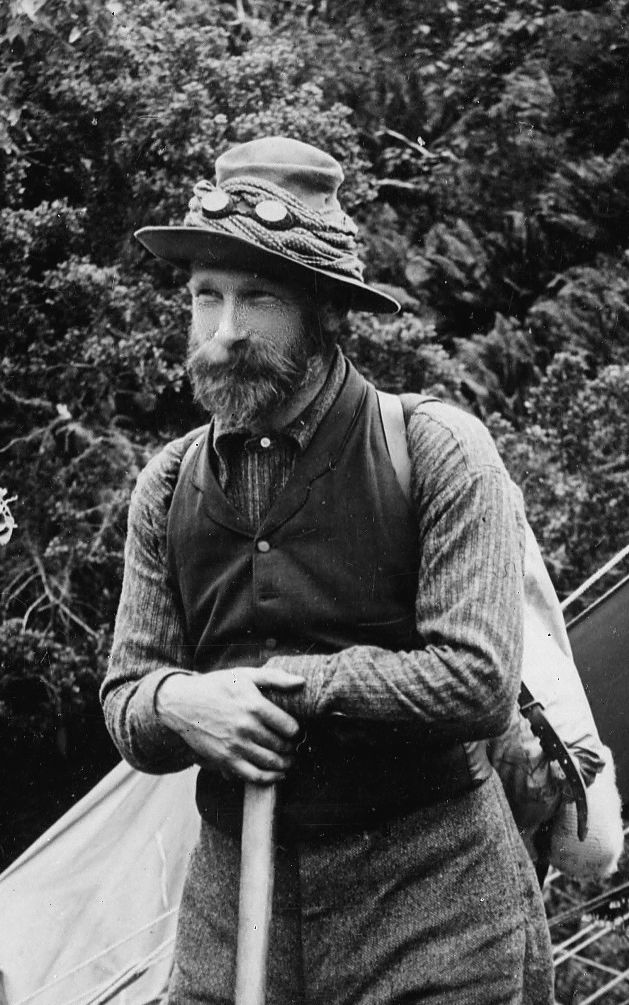
- Ollivier in 1895

Personal information
- Full name: Arthur Morton Ollivier
- Born: 23 March 1851; Hammersmith, Middlesex, England
- Died: 21 October 1897 (aged 46); Christchurch, New Zealand
- Batting: Right-handed
- Role: Wicketkeeper
- Relatives: John Ollivier (father); Keith Ollivier (son)

Domestic team information
- Years: Team
- 1866/67–1882/83: Canterbury

Career statistics
Competition	First-class
Matches	11
Runs scored	349
Batting average	23.26
100s/50s	0/3
Top score	67
Catches/stumpings	8/1
- Source: ESPNCricInfo, 3 January 2020

Arthur Morton Ollivier (23 March 1851 – 21 October 1897) was a businessman in Christchurch, New Zealand, a cricketer, mountaineer, and chess player. Mount Ollivier is named after him.

== Early life ==
Ollivier was born in 1851 in Hammersmith, Middlesex, England. He was the eighth son of John and Elizabeth Ollivier (née Morton). The family with 10 children came to New Zealand on the John Taylor; the ship left London on 10 July 1853 and arrived in Lyttelton on 18 October. He received his education at Christ's College from 1862 to 1865; he was pupil number 179.

== Sport ==
=== Cricket ===
Ollivier was a right-hand batsman. In February 1867, he became a representative cricketer at age 15, when he played for Canterbury against Otago at Hagley Oval; the first cricket game ever that was played on that ground. He was also playing when Canterbury first met Auckland in 1873; the year that the Auckland team was founded.

He played against England in February 1877, and against Australia in January 1878.

Injury forced Ollivier to retire from the game in 1883. He became a trainer, administrator and selector of players. In 1882, Edward Cephas John Stevens and Ollivier initiated the purchase of a parcel of land which became Lancaster Park; this was to overcome the problem of spectators not paying a fee at Hagley Oval. In 1893, he selected the New Zealand team for the match against New South Wales.

=== Mountaineering ===
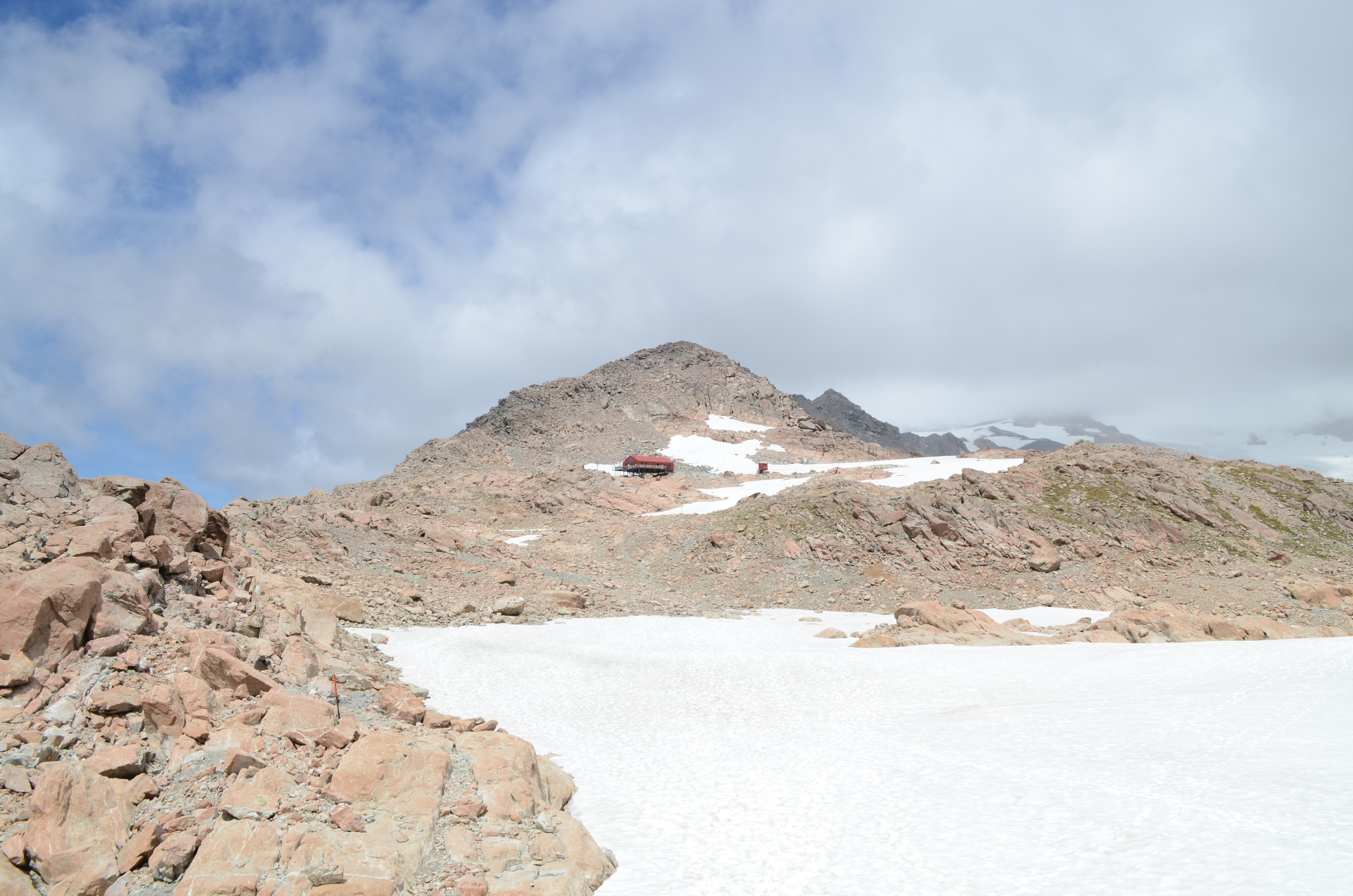
Mueller Hut and the summit of Mount Ollivier

Ollivier was known for his mountaineering exploits and Mount Ollivier is named for him.

=== Other sports ===
Ollivier was a noted sports person in rugby and athletics, especially sprinting. He was a successful chess player, was a founding member of the Canterbury Chess Club in 1877, and was dominion champion in 1888/89.

== Professional career ==
Ollivier was an accountant by profession. His first employment was with D. Macpherson and Co. (which became Matheson's Agency). His next position was with J. T. Ford and Co. He was in partnership with Trevor Grierson before becoming self-employed.

== Community involvement ==
Ollivier was a member of many organisations, and he was often on the committee. He was president of the Old Boys' Association of Christ's College from 1895 until his death. He was deeply involved with the administration of cricket.

== Family, death and commemoration ==
Ollivier married Agnes Thomson (born ca 1849), a daughter of the politician William Thomson, on 20 September 1876 at St Mark's Church in Opawa. They had three children:

- Cecil Claude Morton Ollivier (2 July 1878 – 27 July 1935)
- Keith Morton Ollivier (2 August 1880 – 12 September 1951)
- Muriel Morton Ollivier (19 April 1883 – 20 June 1971)

Ollivier was unwell for several months before his death. He went to Castle Hill in the high country for a change of air, but returned even more ill, reportedly suffering from a complication of internal disorders and dropsy. He died at the age of 46 on 21 October 1897 at home in the Christchurch suburb of Opawa, and was buried at Woolston Cemetery. On Frederick Wilding's proposal the Canterbury Cricket Association erected the gravestone for Ollivier; the inscription reads "Erected by the Cricketers of New Zealand". He was buried on Saturday 23 October 1897; all cricket matches in Canterbury were cancelled on that day.

Mount Ollivier near Aoraki / Mount Cook is named after Arthur Ollivier. In 1939, the 1,933 m (6,342 ft) peak was Edmund Hillary's first major climb. After Hillary's death in 2008, there was a proposal to rename the peak Mount Hillary as a memorial, a suggestion opposed by Arthur Ollivier's family.
