= Wally Farquhar =

Australian cricketer

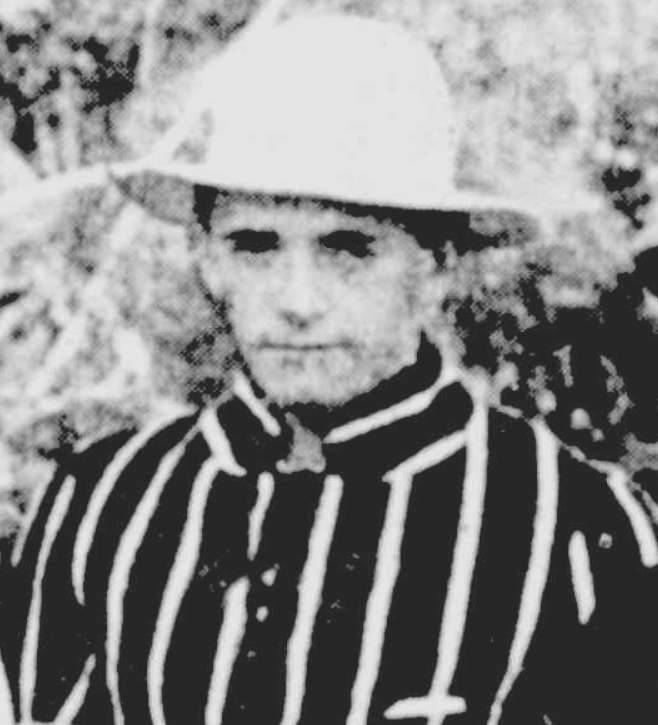

Personal information
- Full name: Barclay Wallace Farquhar
- Born: 22 February 1875; Maitland, New South Wales, Australia
- Died: 31 May 1960 (aged 85); Sydney, Australia
- Source: ESPNcricinfo, 28 December 2016

Wally Farquhar (22 February 1875 – 31 May 1960) was an Australian cricketer. He played eleven first-class matches for New South Wales between 1894/95 and 1903/04.

== See also ==
- List of New South Wales representative cricketers
