= Leslie Minnett =

Australian cricketer

Personal information
- Born: 19 May 1883; Sydney, Australia
- Died: 8 August 1934 (aged 51); Sydney, Australia
- Source: ESPNcricinfo, 8 January 2017

Leslie Minnett (19 May 1883 – 8 August 1934) was an Australian cricketer. He played ten first-class matches for New South Wales between 1907/08 and 1914/15.

== See also ==
- List of New South Wales representative cricketers
