= Charles Hickey (cricketer) =

New Zealand cricketer

Personal information
- Full name: Charles Ernest Henry Hickey
- Born: 10 April 1880; Wellington, New Zealand
- Died: 9 June 1919 (aged 39); Wellington, New Zealand
- Bowling: Right-arm leg-spin

Domestic team information
- Years: Team
- 1902/03–1910/11: Wellington

Career statistics
Competition	First-class
Matches	8
Runs scored	84
Batting average	9.33
100s/50s	0/0
Top score	35
Balls bowled	930
Wickets	26
Bowling average	18.80
5 wickets in innings	0
10 wickets in match	0
Best bowling	4/50
Catches/stumpings	5/–
- Source: Cricinfo, 6 June 2020

Charles Ernest Henry Hickey (10 April 1880 – 9 June 1919) was a New Zealand cricketer who played first-class cricket for Wellington from 1903 to 1910.

== Personal life ==
Hickey was born in Wellington, the son of a prominent local journalist and editor, M. C. Hickey. He became a businessman in Wellington.

Hickey married Amy Eversleigh in Wellington in June 1908. She died on 27 May 1909 after a short illness. He died after an illness in June 1919. Their daughter survived them.

== Cricket career ==
Hickey was a slow leg-spin bowler who was prominent in Wellington club cricket for the Phoenix and East clubs in the years before the First World War. His success for East held back the early career of his club teammate, fellow leg-spinner Clarrie Grimmett.

His best first-class bowling figures were 4 for 50 and 3 for 36 in Wellington's victory over Canterbury in 1909-10. In a two-day non-first-class match between Wellington and Nelson in Wellington in December 1902, Hickey, bowling unchanged throughout the first innings, took 9 for 27, puzzling the Nelson batsmen with his slow leg-breaks. His batting was seldom productive, but he did score 35 to give Wellington a chance of victory in the Plunket Shield match against Auckland in 1910-11.
