= Mount Ollivier =

Mountain in New Zealand

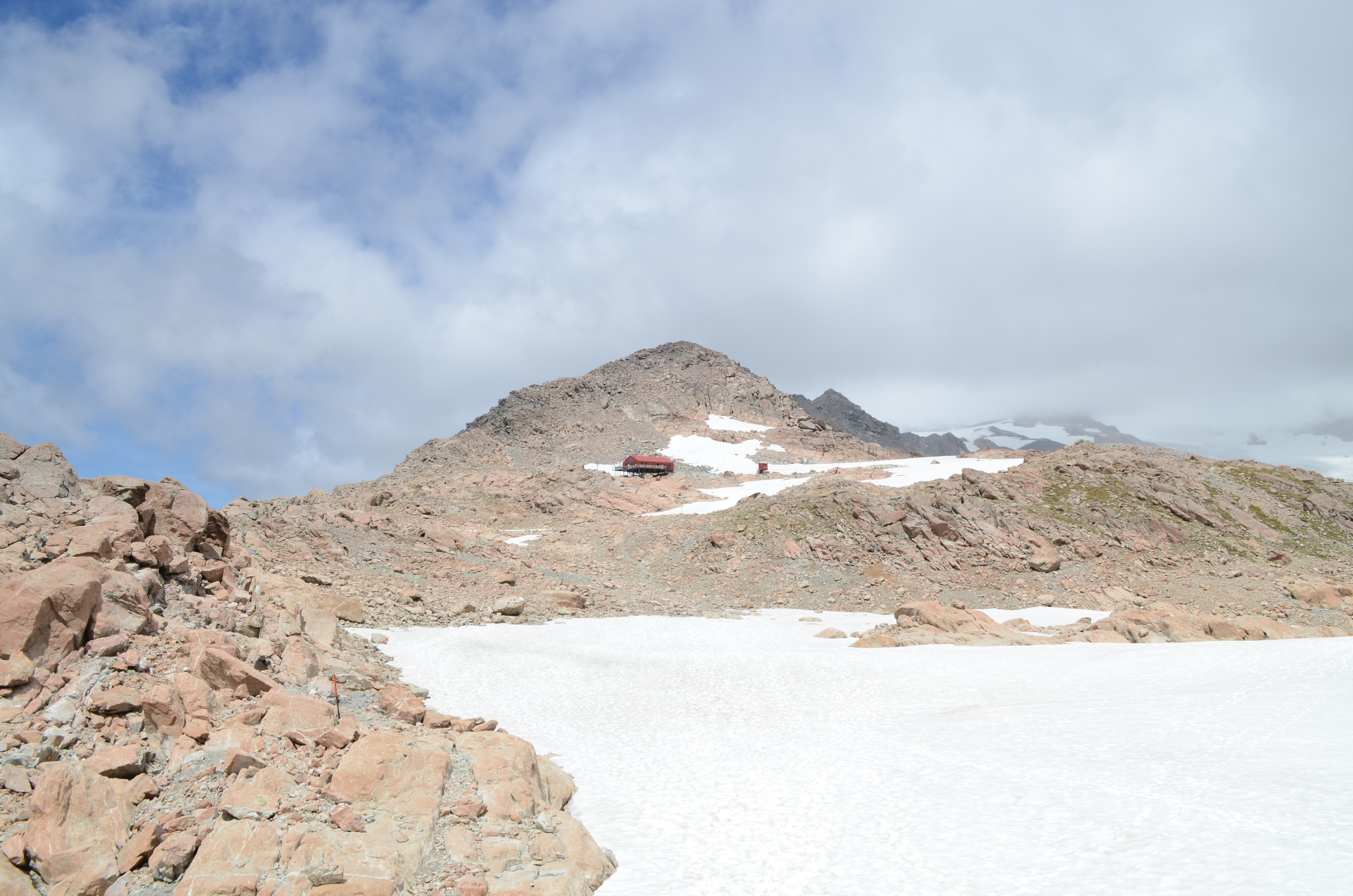
- Mueller Hut and the summit of Mount Ollivier

Highest point
- Elevation: 1,933 m (6,342 ft)
- Coordinates: 43°43′32″S 170°03′52″E

Geography
- Location within New Zealand
- Location: Aoraki / Mount Cook National Park
- Parent range: Sealy Range

Mount Ollivier is a 1,933 m (6,342 ft) mountain in the Canterbury region of New Zealand. It is a peak in the Sealy Range, about 2.5 km (1.6 mi) west of Mount Cook Village. The peak is named after mountaineer Arthur Ollivier, who died in 1897.

Mount Ollivier was Sir Edmund Hillary's first major climb, in 1939. After his death in 2008, there was a proposal to rename the peak Mount Hillary as a memorial, a suggestion opposed by Arthur Ollivier's family.

Since the establishment of a tramping track to Mueller Hut, not far below the summit, the peak is now one of the easiest accessible mountains in the park. The section between Mueller Hut and the summit is a rock scramble rather than a mountain climb.

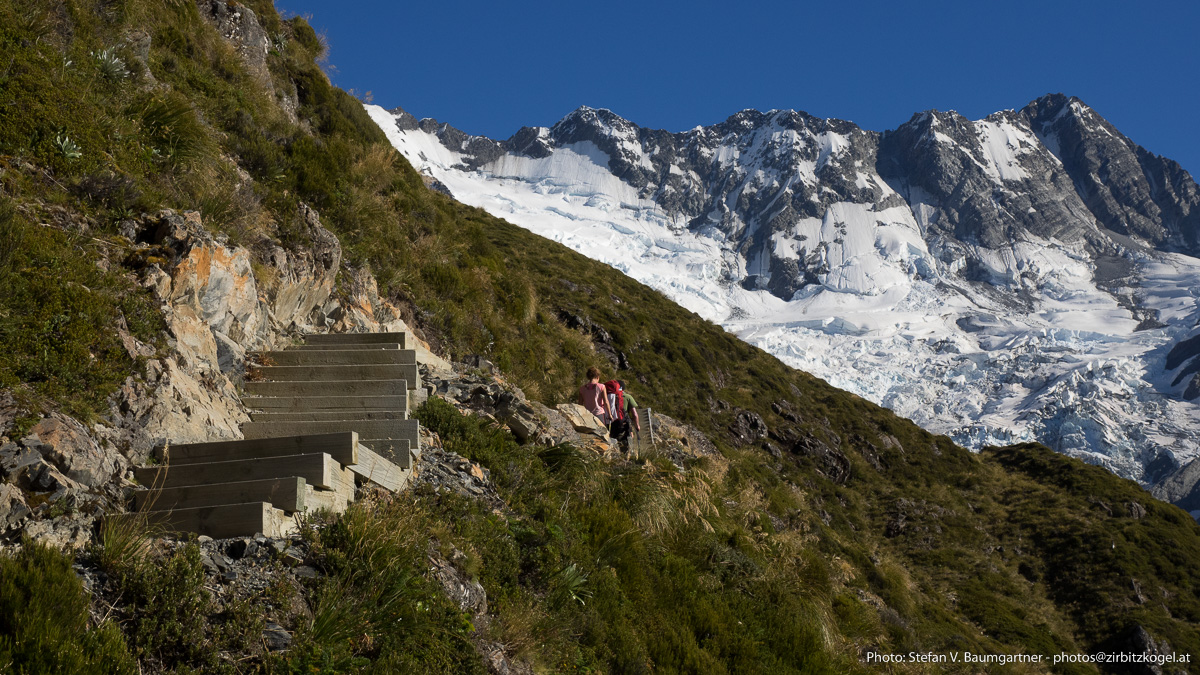
Ascent to Mueller Hut and Mount Ollivier

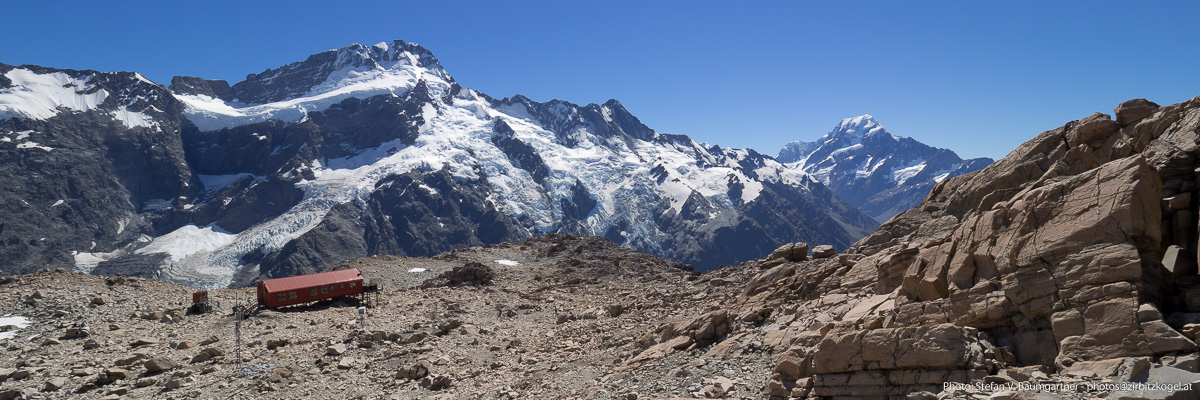
Mueller Hut with Mount Sefton and Aoraki / Mount Cook

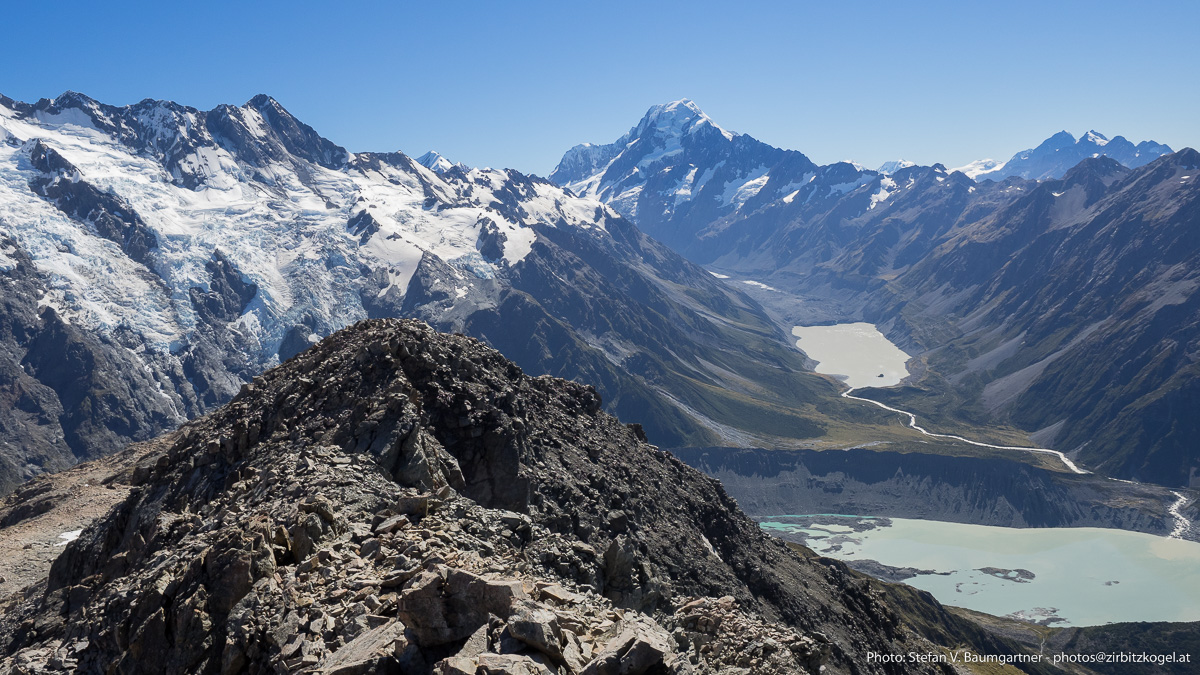
View from the summit of Mount Ollivier
