= Norman Brown (cricketer) =

Australian cricketer

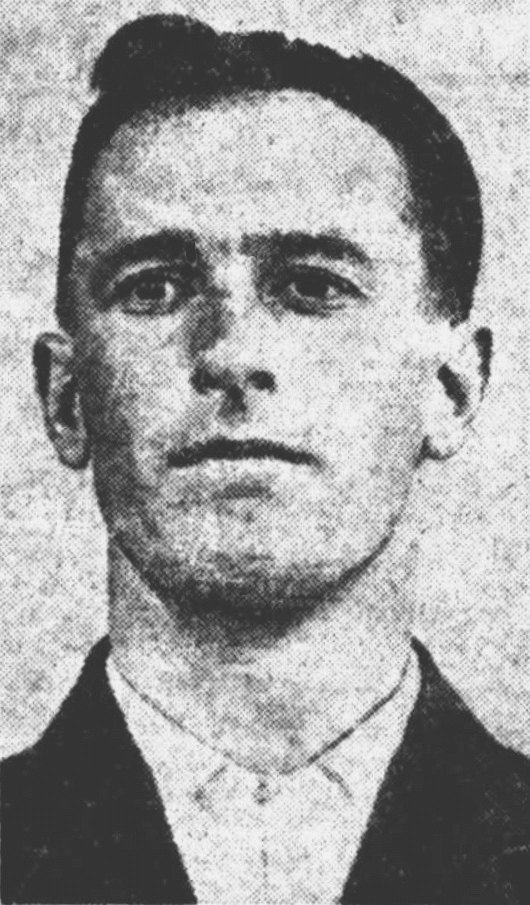

Personal information
- Born: 1 April 1889; Melbourne, Australia
- Died: 7 July 1962 (aged 73); Melbourne, Australia

Domestic team information
- Years: Team
- 1911-1915: Victoria
- Source: Cricinfo, 16 November 2015

Norman Brown (1 April 1889 – 7 July 1962) was an Australian cricketer. He played eleven first-class cricket matches for Victoria between 1911 and 1915.

== See also ==
- List of Victoria first-class cricketers
