= Stan Brice =

New Zealand cricketer

Personal information
- Full name: Alfred William Stanley Brice
- Born: 14 November 1880; South Rakaia, Canterbury, New Zealand
- Died: 5 May 1959 (aged 78); Maraekakaho, Hastings, New Zealand
- Batting: Right-handed
- Bowling: Right-arm medium

Domestic team information
- Years: Team
- 1902/03–1927/28: Wellington

Career statistics
Competition	First-class
Matches	61
Runs scored	1,575
Batting average	17.11
100s/50s	0/8
Top score	87
Balls bowled	11,123
Wickets	247
Bowling average	21.29
5 wickets in innings	19
10 wickets in match	7
Best bowling	9/67
Catches/stumpings	43/–
- Source: Cricinfo, 17 June 2018

Alfred William Stanley Brice (14 November 1880 – 5 May 1959) was a New Zealand cricketer who played first-class cricket for Wellington from 1903 to 1928 and played five times for New Zealand in the days before New Zealand played Test cricket. He was also an early administrator of Rugby league in New Zealand.

He married Mary Silva at Sacred Heart Church in Petone on 24 April 1905.

In a senior club match for Petone in Wellington in March 1918 Brice took 7 for 2 to dismiss the Returned Soldiers' Association team (who batted two short) for 8 in the second innings. He had taken 5 for 13 in the first innings, when the Returned Soldiers' Association team made 45. He took a hat-trick in each innings. He set a wicket-taking record for Wellington senior cricket that season with 93 wickets at an average of 7.19.
