= Algy Gehrs =

Australian sportsman

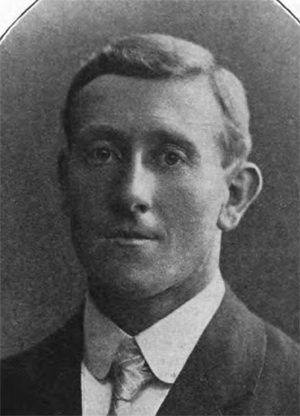
- Gehrs in 1905

Personal information
- Full name: Donald Raeburn Algernon Gehrs
- Born: 29 November 1880; Port Victor, South Australia
- Died: 25 June 1953 (aged 72); King's Park, South Australia
- Batting: Right-handed
- Bowling: Leg-break

International information
- National side: Australia
- Test debut (cap 87): 5 March 1904 v England
- Last Test: 17 February 1911 v South Africa

Domestic team information
- Years: Team
- 1902/03–1920/21: South Australia

Career statistics
Competition	Test	First-class
Matches	6	83
Runs scored	221	4,377
Batting average	20.09	33.66
100s/50s	0/2	13/16
Top score	67	170
Balls bowled	6	638
Wickets	0	8
Bowling average	–	52.00
5 wickets in innings	–	0
10 wickets in match	–	0
Best bowling	–	2/9
Catches/stumpings	6/–	71/4
- Source: Cricinfo, 21 February 2020

Donald Raeburn Algernon Gehrs (29 November 1880 – 25 June 1953) was an Australian sportsman who played six Test matches for Australia from 1904 to 1911 and played Australian rules football for South Adelaide and North Adelaide Football Clubs.

Described as "Tall, thickset and athletic", Gehrs played 13 games of football for South Adelaide in 1902 and seven games for North Adelaide in 1908.

An aggressive opening batsman who liked to take on the fast bowlers, Gehrs played Sheffield Shield cricket for South Australia from 1902–03 to 1920–21. In a first-class match against Western Australia in February 1906, he carried his bat for 148 not out in the first innings (of a team total of 235) and made 100 not out in the second innings. His highest score was 170, when South Australia defeated Victoria by an innings at the Melbourne Cricket Ground in 1904–05. In 1912-13 he scored 119 in 60 minutes against Western Australia in Adelaide.

He toured New Zealand in 1904-05 and England in 1905 with the Australian team. His highest Test score was 67 against South Africa at the Sydney Cricket Ground in 1910–11, when he added 144 for the third wicket with Clem Hill.

Gehrs was also a professional sprinter, who finished third in the Stawell Gift in 1904.

Gehrs gained a diploma in mechanical engineering at the South Australian School of Mines in 1900. He worked for the firm of Poynton and Claxton, land agents, for many years and later became a land agent on his own account. He died in 1953, survived by his wife Olive (née Edwards).
