= Tom Warne =

Australian cricketer

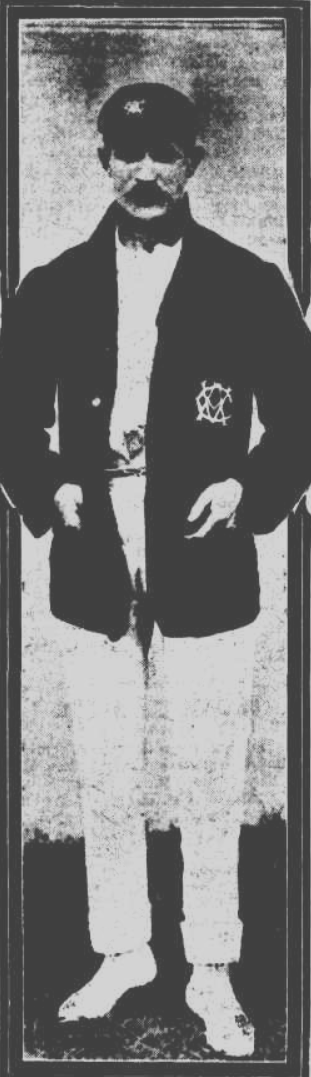

Personal information
- Full name: Tom Summerhayes Warne
- Born: 13 January 1870; North Melbourne, Victoria, Australia
- Died: 7 July 1944 (aged 74); Carlton, Victoria, Australia
- Batting: Right-handed
- Bowling: Right-arm leg-spin
- Relatives: Frank Warne (son)

Domestic team information
- Years: Team
- 1894–95 to 1911–12: Victoria

Career statistics
Competition	First-class
Matches	46
Runs scored	2148
Batting average	31.58
100s/50s	2/16
Top score	153
Balls bowled	2870
Wickets	51
Bowling average	36.88
5 wickets in innings	3
10 wickets in match	0
Best bowling	6/50
Catches/stumpings	31/0
- Source: Cricket Archive, 12 June 2015

Tom Warne (13 January 1870 – 7 July 1944) was an Australian cricketer. He played 46 first-class cricket matches for Victoria between 1895 and 1912. He toured New Zealand with the Australian team in 1909–10 but did not play Test cricket.

== Biography ==
Warne's top score for Victoria was 153 against Tasmania in 1911–12, in the second innings of his last first-class match, when he captained Victoria. In 1901–02 he carried his bat for 61 not out when A. C. MacLaren's XI dismissed Victoria for 129. His best bowling figures were 6 for 50 against New South Wales in 1906–07.

Warne played in the Victorian team against the touring England team on 20 December 1907.

Over almost 30 years he made nearly 10,000 runs for Carlton in Melbourne district cricket. In 1898–99 he became the first person in the competition to score 1000 runs in a season, with 1011 runs at an average of 126, including a top score of 402 against Richmond. He spent the rest of his life as the curator of Carlton's ground. He died at his residence at the ground. He and his wife Alice had six sons (including the cricketer Frank Warne) and six daughters.

== See also ==
- List of Victoria first-class cricketers
