= David Patrick (cricketer) =

New Zealand cricketer

Personal information
- Born: 1886; Melbourne, Australia
- Died: 5 July 1968 (aged 81–82); Wellington, New Zealand
- Source: Cricinfo, 27 October 2020

David Patrick (1886 – 5 July 1968) was a New Zealand cricketer. He played in twelve first-class matches for Wellington from 1907 to 1922.

== See also ==
- List of Wellington representative cricketers
