= Sid Emery =

Australian cricketer

- Sid Emery in 1912

Personal information
- Full name: Sidney Hand Emery
- Born: 15 October 1885; Macdonaldtown, Sydney, Australia
- Died: 7 January 1967 (aged 81); Petersham, Sydney, Australia
- Nickname: Mad Mick
- Batting: Right-handed
- Bowling: Legbreak googly

International information
- National side: Australia
- Test debut (cap 102): 27 May 1912 v England
- Last Test: 5 August 1912 v England

Domestic team information
- Years: Team
- 1908-09 to 1912-13: New South Wales

Career statistics
| Competition | Tests | First-class |
|---|---|---|
| Matches | 4 | 58 |
| Runs scored | 6 | 1192 |
| Batting average | 3.00 | 18.33 |
| 100s/50s | 0/0 | 0/6 |
| Top score | 5 | 80* |
| Balls bowled | 462 | 7078 |
| Wickets | 5 | 183 |
| Bowling average | 49.79 | 23.79 |
| 5 wickets in innings | 0 | 11 |
| 10 wickets in match | 0 | 3 |
| Best bowling | 2/46 | 7/28 |
| Catches/stumpings | 2/– | 30/– |
- Source: Cricinfo, 15 January 2020

Sidney Hand Emery (15 October 1885 – 7 January 1967) was an Australian cricketer who played in four Tests in 1912. He played first-class cricket for New South Wales from 1908 to 1912.

== Life and career ==
Sid Emery, nicknamed "Mad Mick" by his teammates, was an unusually fast leg-spin and googly bowler who spun the ball prodigiously, making his bowling erratic and unpredictable. In 1909-10 he opened the bowling for New South Wales and took 7 for 28 and 5 for 85 against Victoria in the Sheffield Shield. He toured New Zealand with the Australian side later that season, playing in all six first-class matches, including two against New Zealand, and taking 22 wickets at an average of 16.13. He was also a hard-hitting lower-order batsman who scored 58 not out in an hour and then in the second innings 80 not out in 46 minutes for New South Wales against the touring South Africans in 1910–11.

When several of Australia's leading players refused to go on the tour of England in 1912, Emery was one of those chosen to replace them. In his first match on the tour, against Northamptonshire, he opened the bowling and took 5 for 52 and 7 for 58. A week later, against Surrey, he took 6 for 54 and 5 for 81. Australia won both matches easily. He played in two Tests against England and two against South Africa during the tour, but with little success, and finished the tour with 67 first-class wickets at an average of 23.89. An English journalist described his bowling as "puzzling" and "weird", noting that his full toss was one of his most dangerous deliveries because the amount of spin he imparted to the ball made its trajectory difficult for the batsman to read.

Emery was also a member of the Australian team that toured North America between May and September 1913. He played no further first-class cricket after the tour.

The Australian Test leg-spin bowler Arthur Mailey considered Emery one of the best natural spin bowlers he had seen, and described him as "a wild relentless fellow with the strength of Hercules". He added: "When Alf Noble told him he would be a great bowler if he could control his 'googly', Emery answered, 'I'd be a great man if I could control myself.'" The English Test batsman C. B. Fry described Emery as the world's "best-worst" bowler. A. G. Moyes wrote that "Emery on his day was a devastating bowler. He bowled his bosies faster than any other man I have seen, and when he found his length was as close to unplayable as any bowler within memory, but the trouble was that he did not find it, or keep it, often enough."

Emery worked for the Sydney Tramways, retiring in April 1950 owing to failing eyesight.

== See also ==
- List of New South Wales representative cricketers
