= William Scott (Australian cricketer) =

Australian cricketer

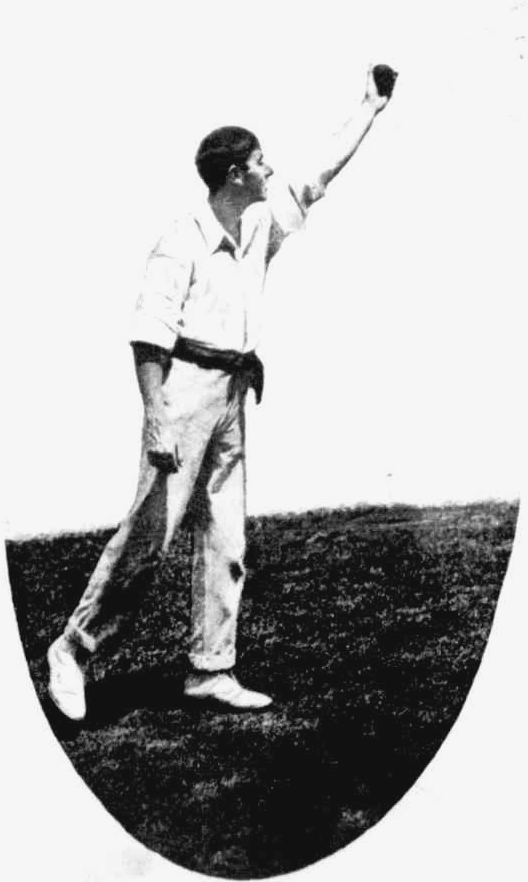

Personal information
- Born: 14 June 1882; West Hotham, Australia
- Died: 30 September 1965 (aged 83); Ferntree Gully, Australia

Domestic team information
- Years: Team
- 1904-1912: Victoria
- Source: Cricinfo, 15 November 2015

William Scott (14 June 1882 – 30 September 1965) was an Australian cricketer. He played sixteen first-class cricket matches for Victoria between 1904 and 1912.

== See also ==
- List of Victoria first-class cricketers
