= David Smith (sportsman) =

Australian sportsman

Dave Smith
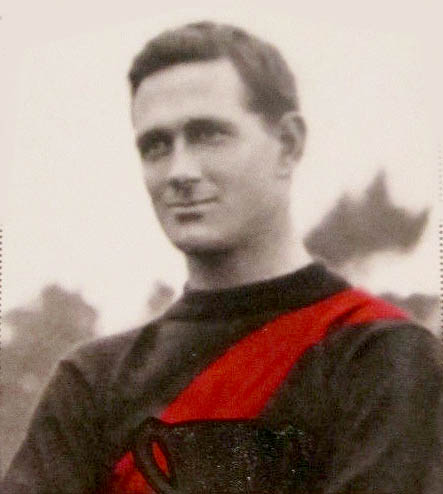
- Smith in 1911

Personal information
- Full name: David Bertram Miller Smith
- Born: 14 September 1884; Richmond, Victoria
- Died: 29 July 1963 (aged 78); Hawthorn, Victoria
- Height: 183 cm (6 ft 0 in)
- Weight: 82 kg (181 lb)

Playing career^{1}
Years	Club	Games (Goals)
1903–1911	Essendon	142 (114)
1914	Richmond	1 (3)
Total		143 (117)

Coaching career
Years	Club	Games (W–L–D)
1908–1909	Essendon	39 (26–13–0)
- ^{1} Playing statistics correct to the end of 1914.

David Smith
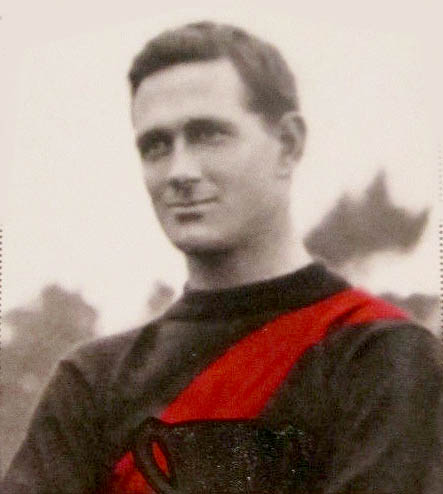

Cricket information
- Batting: Right-handed

International information
- National side: Australia
- Test debut (cap 104): 24 June 1912 v England
- Last Test: 19 August 1912 v England

Career statistics
Competition	Test	First-class
Matches	2	46
Runs scored	30	1764
Batting average	15.00	23.83
100s/50s	0/0	3/6
Top score	24*	146
Balls bowled	0	24
Wickets	0	1
Bowling average	–	22.00
5 wickets in innings	–	0
10 wickets in match	–	0
Best bowling	–	1/22
Catches/stumpings	0/–	16/–
- Source: Cricinfo, 13 October 2022

David Bertram Miller Smith (14 September 1884 – 29 July 1963) was an Australian sportsman.

== Football career ==
His father was a champion Australian rules footballer for Carlton when Carlton was still in the Victorian Football Association (VFA) competition.

Although born in Richmond, Dave Smith played 142 games of Australian rules football in the Victorian Football League (VFL) with Essendon from 1903 to 1913, scoring 114 goals, captaining the Essendon team in its 1911 premiership year; his decision to go to Essendon (which, at the time, was playing its home games at the nearby Richmond) was because Richmond was a member of the VFA at the time.

He later played one match for Richmond in 1914, scoring three goals, and then retired.

== Cricket career ==
He played district cricket with Richmond Cricket Club, captaining the team from 1910 to 1915, scoring 2404 runs, and winning the batting average in seasons 1908–09 and 1909–10. He played 46 first-class matches for Victoria and various Australian teams.

He toured New Zealand with the Australian side in 1909–10, and England with the Australians in 1912, where he played in two of the Test matches.

Having failed to appear at a disciplinary hearing of the Australian Cricket Board, conducted on the 1912 team's return to Australia to answer allegations that had been specifically levelled against him of indiscipline, drunken brawling, rudeness towards the English public, claiming illness, he never played another first-class match.
