= Frederick Midlane =

New Zealand cricketer

Personal information
- Full name: Frederick Alexander Midlane
- Born: 28 March 1883; Wellington, New Zealand
- Died: 18 October 1976 (aged 93); Wigan, England
- Batting: Right-handed

Domestic team information
- Years: Team
- 1898/99–1914/15: Wellington
- 1917/18–1918/19: Auckland

Career statistics
Competition	First-class
Matches	30
Runs scored	1,727
Batting average	35.24
100s/50s	4/7
Top score	222*
Balls bowled	96
Wickets	2
Bowling average	35.50
5 wickets in innings	0
10 wickets in match	0
Best bowling	2/13
Catches/stumpings	22/–
- Source: ESPNcricinfo, 26 November 2016

Frederick Midlane (28 March 1883 – 18 October 1976) was a New Zealand cricketer. He played first-class cricket for Auckland and Wellington between 1898 and 1919. In January 1915, opening the batting for Wellington against Otago, Midlane carried his bat to score 222 not out in a total of 498. At the time it was the highest score in New Zealand first-class cricket.
