= Eric McElhone =

Australian cricketer

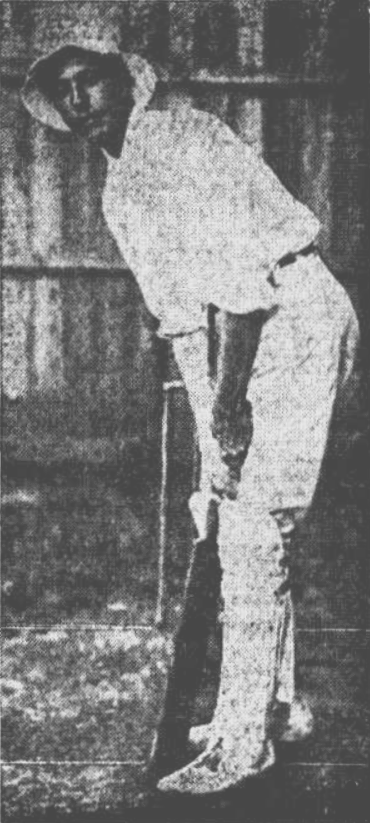

Personal information
- Born: 27 June 1887; Sydney, Australia
- Died: 21 July 1981 (aged 94); Sydney, Australia
- Source: ESPNcricinfo, 8 January 2017

Eric McElhone (27 June 1887 – 21 July 1981) was an Australian cricketer. He played seven first-class matches for New South Wales between 1910/11 and 1911/12.

At the time of his death in July 1981, aged 94, McElhone was the oldest surviving New South Wales player.
