= James Kyle (cricketer) =

Australian cricketer

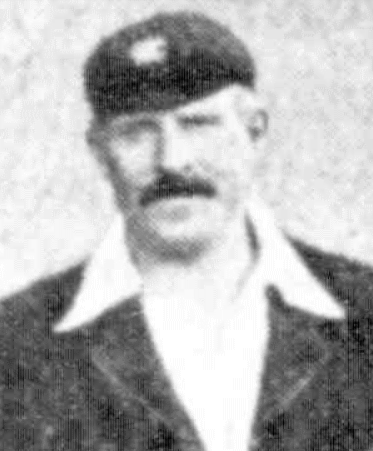

Personal information
- Full name: James Henderson Kyle
- Born: 29 May 1879; Coimadai, Victoria, Australia
- Died: 11 January 1919 (aged 39); Middle Park, Victoria

Domestic team information
- Years: Team
- 1908-1912: Victoria
- Source: Cricinfo, 15 November 2015

James Henderson Kyle (29 May 1879 – 11 January 1919) was an Australian cricketer. He played 17 first-class cricket matches for Victoria between 1908 and 1912.

== Family ==
The son of Alexander Kyle, and Mary Kyle, née Cooper, James Henderson Kyle was born at Coimadai on 29 May 1879. He married Mary Henderson Armstrong (1874–1952) on 15 March 1905.

== Death ==
He collapsed and died, having completed his innings and chatting with friends spectators, during a cricket match at Middle Park on 11 January 1919.

== See also ==
- List of Victoria first-class cricketers
