= Joseph Bennett (cricketer, born 1881) =

New Zealand cricketer (1881–1947)

Joe Bennett
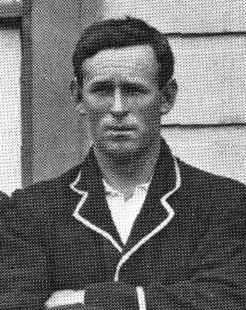
- Bennett in 1910

Personal information
- Full name: Joseph Henry Bennett
- Born: 28 February 1881; Christchurch, New Zealand
- Died: 29 August 1947 (aged 66); Christchurch
- Height: 6 ft 0 in (1.83 m)
- Batting: Right-handed
- Bowling: Right-arm medium pace

International information
- National side: New Zealand

Domestic team information
- Years: Team
- 1898–99 to 1919–20: Canterbury

Career statistics
| Competition | First-class |
|---|---|
| Matches | 52 |
| Runs scored | 880 |
| Batting average | 11.73 |
| 100s/50s | 0/2 |
| Top score | 58 |
| Balls bowled | 11,260 |
| Wickets | 241 |
| Bowling average | 18.55 |
| 5 wickets in innings | 20 |
| 10 wickets in match | 4 |
| Best bowling | 7/35 |
| Catches/stumpings | 15/0 |
- Source: Cricinfo, 24 September 2014

Joseph Henry Bennett (28 February 1881 – 29 August 1947) was a cricketer who played first-class cricket for Canterbury from 1898 to 1920, and played several times for New Zealand in the days before New Zealand played Test cricket.

== Cricket career ==
=== 1898 to 1910 ===
A medium-pace bowler, Joe Bennett made his first-class debut for Canterbury at the age of 17 in 1898–99, but did not establish himself in the side until 1904–05. In the first match of the 1904–05 season, against Wellington, he took 6 for 44 and 4 for 35 to help Canterbury to a 201-run victory. In the next match a few days later he took 4 for 58 and 5 for 10 against Otago. He was selected for the two matches New Zealand played against Australia later that season, but took only the wickets of Victor Trumper and Clem Hill at a cost of 156 runs from 33 overs.

In the second match in 1905–06 he took 5 for 52 and 5 for 34 in a 35-run victory over Wellington. He finished the season as the highest wicket-taker in the country, with 22 wickets at an average of 12.13. He was again the leading New Zealand bowler in 1906–07, with 31 wickets at 21.67. In 1907–08, in the first-ever match for the Plunket Shield, he took 5 for 169 in Auckland's innings when Auckland beat Canterbury at Hagley Oval in Christchurch.

Bennett went to England in 1908 with the aim of becoming a professional cricketer. Although he played a few matches for London County he was not successful overall, and returned to New Zealand later that year. He was New Zealand's most successful bowler when Australia played two matches at the end of the 1909–10 season, taking eight wickets, though Australia won both matches easily.

=== 1910 to 1920 ===
At Lancaster Park in 1910–11, Bennett bowled unchanged throughout the match to take 5 for 9 (figures of 9–5–9–5) and 7 for 35 to dismiss Wellington for 52 and 60 and give Canterbury victory by 322 runs. He helped Canterbury to an innings victory in the final match of the Plunket Shield in 1913–14 by scoring 58 at number ten and taking 4 for 48 and 7 for 87. Ten of his victims were bowled. He toured Australia with a New Zealand side shortly afterwards, taking eight wickets in the four matches against state teams. When Australia in turn toured New Zealand shortly afterwards, Bennett was playing for Canterbury when Victor Trumper and Arthur Sims added 433 runs in 190 minutes, a world record for the eighth wicket that still stands. Bennett was the only Canterbury bowler to keep the batsmen in check, even bowling a maiden at one stage during the whirlwind partnership. He finished with 5 for 179 off 56 overs.

He was the highest wicket-taker in the Plunket Shield in the seasons before World War I, with 52 wickets at an average of 19.65.

Bennett served overseas with the Army in World War I. He played one final match for Canterbury in 1920, but he suffered a leg injury early in the match and was able to bowl only three overs.

Dick Brittenden said Bennett was "one of the finest length bowlers New Zealand has known", who could "bowl hours on end without sending down a loose one ... doing just a little off the pitch most of the time".

== Later life ==
Bennett moved to Loburn, north of Christchurch, in the early 1920s, taking up farming. He captained a team representing the combined Canterbury sub-associations against Canterbury in December 1925.

In 1934 Bennett returned to Christchurch to work as coach and groundsman at Lancaster Park. He died in Christchurch in August 1947, aged 66.
