= Robert Rees (cricketer) =

Australian cricketer

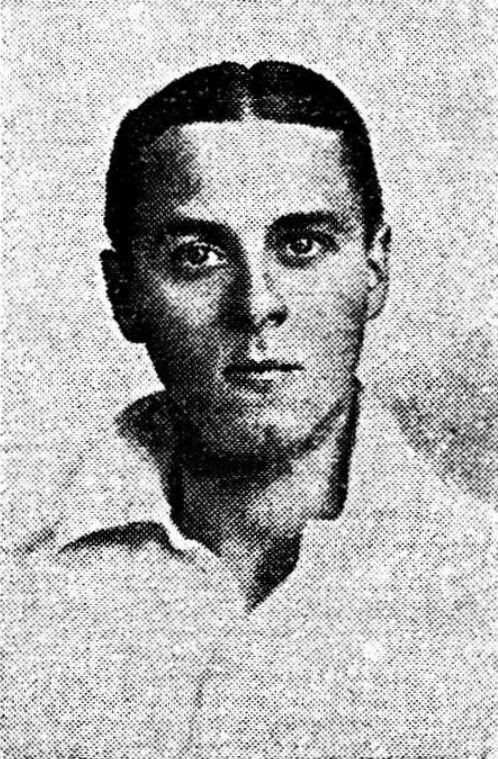

Personal information
- Born: 15 April 1882; Adelaide, Australia
- Died: 20 September 1966 (aged 84)
- Source: Cricinfo, 21 September 2020

Robert Rees (15 April 1882 – 20 September 1966) was an Australian cricketer. He played in thirteen first-class matches for South Australia between 1903 and 1913.

== See also ==
- List of South Australian representative cricketers
