= Edgar Mayne =

Australian cricketer

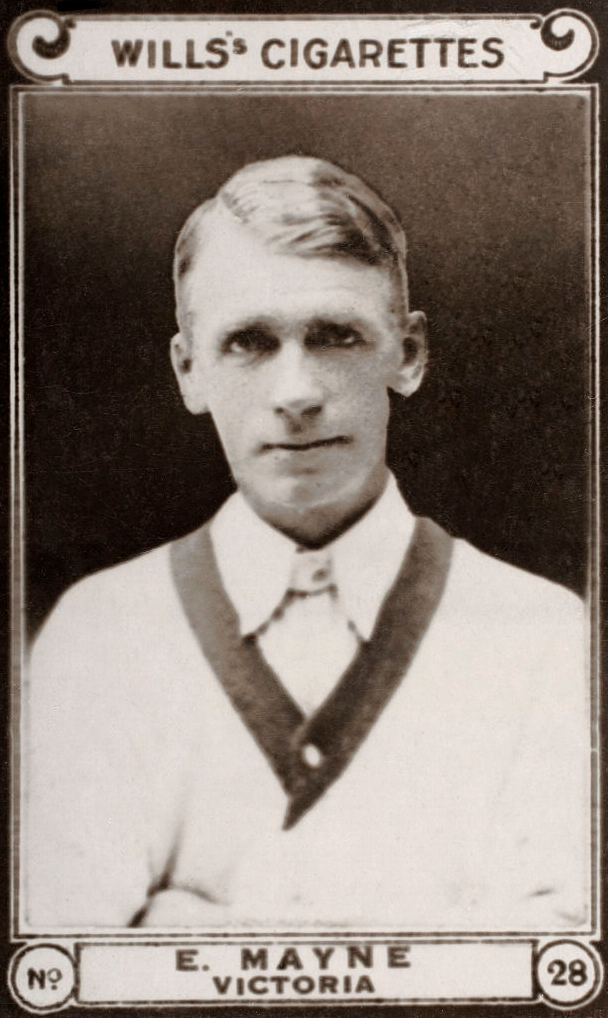
- Mayne in about 1920

Personal information
- Full name: Edgar Richard Mayne
- Born: 2 July 1882; Jamestown, South Australia
- Died: 26 October 1961 (aged 79); Richmond, Melbourne, Victoria
- Batting: Right-handed
- Bowling: Right-arm

International information
- National side: Australia
- Test debut (cap 105): 15 July 1912 v South Africa
- Last Test: 26 November 1921 v South Africa

Career statistics
Competition	Test	First-class
Matches	4	141
Runs scored	64	7,624
Batting average	21.33	32.72
100s/50s	0/0	14/39
Top score	25*	209
Balls bowled	6	859
Wickets	0	13
Bowling average	–	33.84
5 wickets in innings	–	0
10 wickets in match	–	0
Best bowling	–	3/6
Catches/stumpings	2/–	80/–
- Source: Cricinfo, 29 August 2020

Edgar Richard "Ernie" Mayne (2 July 1882 – 26 October 1961) was an Australian cricketer who played as a right-handed batsman and bowler.

Mayne played in four Test matches for Australia between 1912 and 1921. He made his Test debut on 15 July 1912 against South Africa in the 1912 Triangular Tournament in England. His final two Tests came on the Australian tour to South Africa in 1921/22, with his last test appearance at Newlands Cricket Ground.

Mayne played first-class cricket for South Australia and Victoria between 1906 and 1925.
