= List of Queensland first-class cricketers =

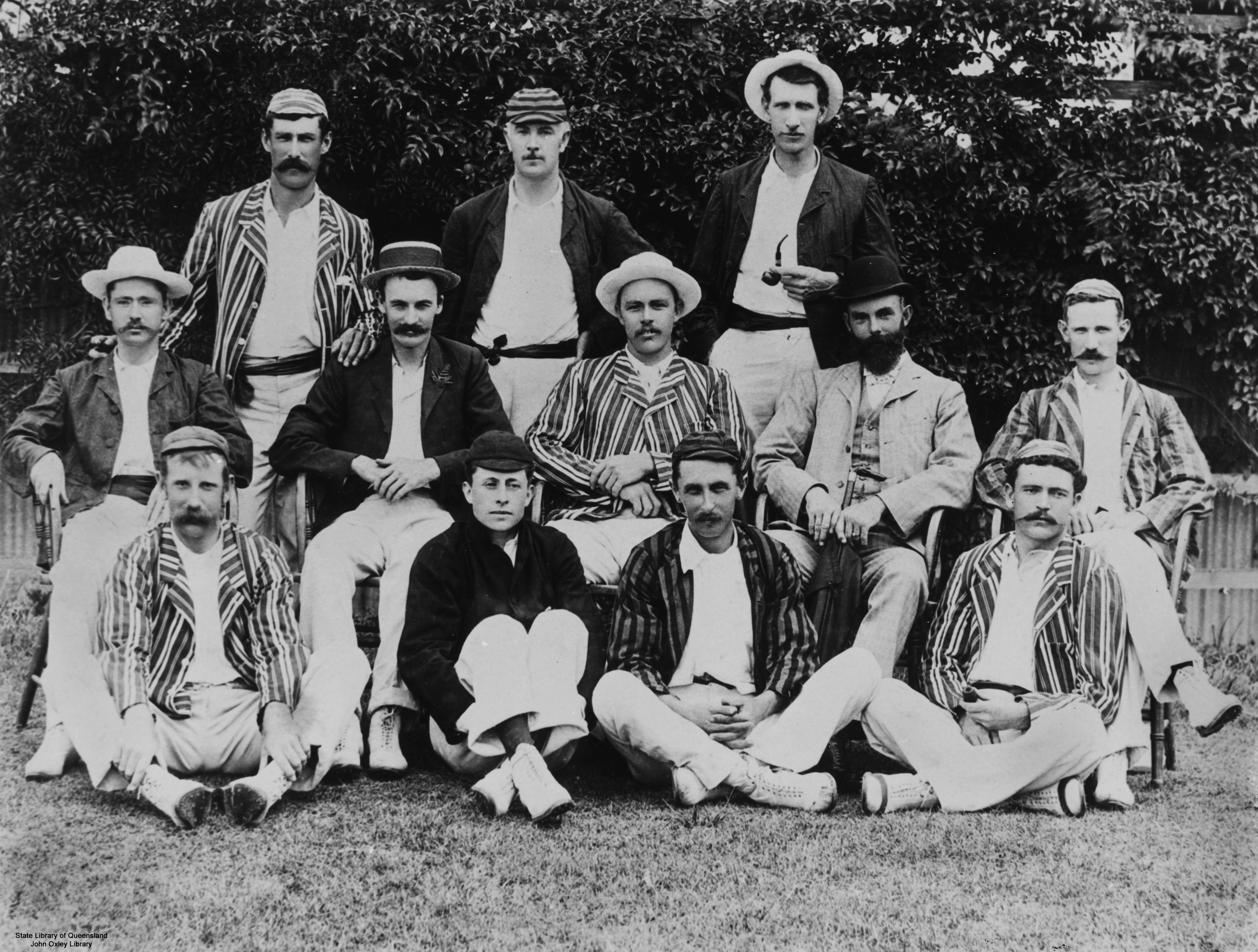
Queensland First-class side, 1895.

This is a complete list in alphabetical order of cricketers who have played for Queensland in First-Class matches since 1892–93.

The Appendix contains names of 18 players who appeared for Queensland teams in List A or Twenty20 cricket matches, but who have not so far appeared in any first-class matches for the team.

== List ==
Statistics included are only for matches played for Queensland
Players who hold a state contract for the 2019–21 season have their names in bold
Players who have played international cricket are highlighted in blue

Name	Nat	First	Last	Mat	Runs	HS	Avg	100	50	Wkt	BB	Ave	5wi	10wm	C	St	Ref
William Abell	(Australia)	1902–03	1902–03	1	8	8	4.00	0	0	–	–	–	–	–	1	0	
James Adams	(Australia)	1930–31	1930–31	1	25	16	12.50	0	0	–	–	–	–	–	1	0	
Charlie Adamson	(England)	1899–1900	1899–1900	1	10	10	5.00	0	0	–	–	–	–	–	1	0	
Bill Albury	(Australia)	1970–71	1973–74	28	365	42	11.06	0	0	75	5/90	32.18	2	–	14	0	
Peter Allan	(Australia)	1959–60	1968–69	52	674	41	10.87	0	0	199	10/61	25.55	11	3	19	0	
Don Allen	(Australia)	1971–72	1974–75	11	386	61	18.38	0	1	–	–	–	–	–	4	0	
Ross Allen	(Australia)	1962–63	1962–63	1	18	18*	18.00	0	0	2	2/54	31.00	–	–	1	0	
Thorpe Allen	(Australia)	1898–99	1898–99	1	6	6	3.00	0	0	–	–	–	–	–	0	0	
Tom Allen	(Australia)	1933–34	1940–41	43	1869	146	24.27	4	8	20	5/108	48.10	1	–	15	0	
Gordon Amos	(Australia)	1931–32	1936–37	20	506	93	13.65	0	1	41	5/83	40.29	2	–	22	0	
James Anderson	(Australia)	1919–20	1919–20	2	36	16	9.00	0	0	5	4/88	39.00	-	–	2	0	
Matthew Anderson	(Australia)	1999–2000	2002–03	15	19	7*	2.37	0	0	27	4/50	37.62	–	–	9	0	
Peter Anderson	(Australia)	1986–87	1992–93	44	1159	63	16.32	0	5	–	–	–	–	–	127	13	
Cassie Andrews	(Australia)	1931–32	1936–37	26	1609	253	32.84	2	6	5	2/37	25.80	–	–	11	0	
Ken Archer	(Australia)	1946–47	1956–57	55	2484	118	27.91	2	18	12	2/16	50.50	–	–	56	1	
Ron Archer	(Australia)	1951–52	1958–59	34	1646	114	32.92	1	10	83	7/62	25.42	3	–	35	0	
Edward Armstrong	(Australia)	1905–06	1911–12	3	13	7	2.60	0	0	1	1/85	189.00	–	–	0	0	
George Armstrong	(Australia)	1909–10	1910–11	2	36	16	9.00	0	0	–	–	–	–	–	0	0	
William Armstrong	(Australia)	1907–08	1911–12	5	97	27	10.77	0	0	1	1/1	59.00	–	–	0	0	
Rocco Atkins	(Australia)	1895–96	1905–06	11	398	82	19.90	0	3	–	–	–	–	–	8	0	
Moffitt Austin	(Australia)	1894–95	1894–95	2	12	10*	6.00	0	0	7	3/23	12.71	–	–	2	0	
Ryall Ayres	(Australia)	1952–53	1959–60	4	72	26	14.40	0	0	–	–	–	–	–	1	0	
Sydney Ayres	(Australia)	1913–14	1924–25	14	354	74	16.85	0	1	35	7/83	31.20	3	–	17	0	
Glen Baker	(Australia)	1936–37	1941–42	29	1531	157	31.24	1	11	13	3/17	42.92	–	–	19	0	
Len Balcam	(Australia)	1978–79	1979–80	5	58	21	14.50	0	0	15	3/35	23.47	–	–	0	0	
Tom Ball	(Australia)	1946–47	1947–48	3	11	9	3.66	0	0	8	3/57	27.62	–	–	1	0	
Robert Barbour	(Australia)	1919–20	1919–20	2	74	41	18.50	0	0	–	–	–	–	–	1	0	
John Barnes	(Australia)	1940–41	1940–41	1	15	8	7.50	0	0	–	–	–	–	–	0	0	
Trevor Barsby	(Australia)	1984–85	1996–97	111	6913	165	35.81	15	35	1	1/8	63.00	–	–	76	0	
Charles Barstow	(Australia)	1906–07	1925–26	22	187	43*	6.44	0	0	78	8/51	28.08	5	2	10	0	
**Xavier Bartlett**	(Australia)	2019–20	2020–21	5	46	16	15.33	0	0	20	5/85	23.85	1	–	1	0	
Glen Batticciotto	(Australia)	2009–10	2009–10	5	177	101	22.12	1	0	1	1/37	37.00	–	–	4	0	
Simon Beattie	(Australia)	1982–83	1982–83	1	10	10*	10.00	0	0	–	–	–	–	–	0	0	
Norman Beeston	(Australia)	1924–25	1927–28	7	187	52*	23.37	0	1	–	–	–	–	–	1	0	
John Bell	(Australia)	1978–79	1978–79	2	16	12	5.33	0	0	–	–	–	–	–	8	0	
Ernest Benbow	(Australia)	1909–10	1909–10	2	53	33	13.25	0	0	–	–	–	–	–	0	0	
Hilton Bendixen	(Australia)	1940–41	1940–41	1	1	1	1.00	0	0	1	1/75	75.00	–	–	0	0	
Eric Bensted	(Australia)	1923–24	1936–37	58	2700	155	26.73	3	15	76	4/28	43.34	–	–	38	0	
Andy Bichel	(Australia)	1992–93	2007–08	98	2809	125	22.29	3	10	463	7/54	23.44	23	4	46	0	
Don Bichel	(Australia)	1963–64	1964–65	3	63	46	10.50	0	0	6	4/80	47.66	–	–	2	0	
Malcolm Biggs	(Australia)	1927–28	1930–31	6	194	108	21.55	1	0	–	–	–	–	–	2	0	
Graham Bizzell	(Australia)	1961–62	1965–66	30	1182	101*	27.48	1	9	1	1/5	68.00	–	–	20	0	
John Blackstock	(Australia)	1896–97	1896–97	1	12	12	6.00	0	0	–	–	–	–	–	1	0	
Marcus Blaxland	(Australia)	1923–24	1923–24	1	1	1	1.00	0	0	–	–	–	–	–	1	0	
Kenneth Boag	(Australia)	1933–34	1934–35	2	20	12	10.00	0	0	–	–	–	–	–	2	0	
John Bolton	(Australia)	1911–12	1914–15	5	90	26	10.00	0	0	–	–	–	–	–	2	3	
Allan Border	(Australia)	1980–81	1995–96	98	7661	196	52.68	18	41	32	5/46	37.03	1	–	115	0	
Ian Botham	(England)	1987–88	1987–88	11	646	70	34.00	0	7	29	3/12	27.76	–	–	18	0	
Gordon Bourne	(Australia)	1930–31	1930–31	1	10	6*	10.00	0	0	–	–	–	–	–	0	0	
Samuel Bowden	(Australia)	1893–94	1893–94	1	2	1*	–	0	0	1	1/26	40.00	–	–	1	0	
Cameron Boyce	(Australia)	2009–10	2015–16	41	734	66	15.96	0	3	80	7/68	49.10	3	–	29	0	
George Brabon	(Australia)	1978–79	1981–82	6	12	6	4.00	0	0	14	4/106	35.21	–	–	1	0	
William Bradley	(Australia)	1892–93	1899–1900	15	431	63	17.24	0	2	–	–	–	–	–	10	7	
Murray Bragg	(Australia)	2007–08	2007–08	1	8	8	8.00	0	0	–	–	–	–	–	2	0	
Scott Brant	(Zimbabwe)	2001–02	2007–08	8	39	19*	19.50	0	0	24	4/59	18.46	–	–	8	0	
Jim Bratchford	(Australia)	1952–53	1959–60	53	1542	143	22.92	2	6	120	6/57	29.48	3	–	28	0	
Francis Brew	(Australia)	1924–25	1933–34	27	650	102	14.44	1	0	40	4/31	54.05	–	–	20	0	
Cameron Brimblecombe	(Australia)	2014–15	2014–15	1	6	6	3.00	0	0	1	1/115	115.00	–	–	20	0	
Ryan Broad	(Australia)	2005–06	2011–12	57	3082	135	31.45	8	12	3	1/3	27.67	–	–	31	0	
Wayne Broad	(Australia)	1977–78	1982–83	34	1531	120	26.39	1	6	8	3/20	54.37	–	–	19	0	
Anthony Brown	(Australia)	1983–84	1985–86	2	44	32	14.66	0	0	2	2/34	29.50	–	–	1	0	
Guy Brown	(Australia)	1906–07	1908–09	5	231	70	23.10	0	1	–	–	–	–	–	5	0	
John Brown	(Australia)	1964–65	1965–66	6	163	36	16.30	0	0	–	–	–	–	–	5	0	
Bill Brown	(Australia)	1936–37	1949–50	48	4420	215	53.25	9	26	1	1/2	34.00	–	–	30	1	
Wilf Brown	(Australia)	1952–53	1952–53	2	10	6	3.33	0	0	–	–	–	–	–	1	0	
William Browne	(Australia)	1921–22	1921–22	1	7	6	3.50	0	0	–	–	–	–	–	0	0	
**Max Bryant**	(Australia)	2019–20	2019–20	1	5	5	2.50	0	0	–	–	–	–	–	0	0	
Cecil Bryce	(Australia)	1939–40	1939–40	1	1	1	0.50	0	0	–	–	–	–	–	0	0	
John Buchanan	(Australia)	1978–79	1978–79	7	160	41	12.30	0	0	–	–	–	–	–	5	0	
Bill Buckle	(Australia)	1963–64	1971–72	23	1114	207	28.56	2	3	–	–	–	–	–	5	0	
Desmond Bull	(Australia)	1956–57	1967–68	68	3292	167*	29.92	5	19	–	–	–	–	–	5	0	
Peter Burge	(Australia)	1952–53	1967–68	91	7627	283	56.08	24	33	–	–	–	–	–	77	3	
Harold Burns	(Australia)	1930–31	1931–32	5	76	22*	10.85	0	0	–	–	–	–	–	11	2	
**Joe Burns**	(Australia)	2010–11	2020–21	82	5824	202*	41.60	13	33	1	1/0	34.00	–	–	87	0	
Thomas Byrne	(Australia)	1896–97	1905–06	17	235	44	8.39	0	0	62	5/74	28.53	4	–	5	0	
Tim Caban	(Australia)	1975–76	1975–76	1	4	2	2.00	0	0	1	1/45	45.00	–	–	1	0	
William Cain	(Australia)	1924–25	1924–25	3	72	39	18.00	0	0	–	–	–	–	–	0	0	
Malcolm Campbell	(Australia)	1899–1900	1899–1900	1	10	7	5.00	0	0	1	1/83	83.00	–	–	1	0	
Peter Cantrell	(Netherlands)	1988–89	1990–91	33	1796	176*	33.26	3	11	27	4/52	63.00	–	–	40	0	
James Carew	(Australia)	1898–99	1905–06	13	513	52	19.73	0	1	2	2/105	88.00	–	–	0	0	
Patrick Carew	(Australia)	1899–1900	1902–03	5	125	32	12.50	0	0	9	3/17	35.77	–	–	2	0	
Paul Carew	(Australia)	1986–87	1989–90	5	46	23	11.50	0	0	10	2/43	51.30	–	–	2	0	
Phil Carlson	(Australia)	1969–70	1980–81	79	3843	110*	30.74	5	18	110	7/42	24.15	5	1	47	0	
Jack Carlton	(Australia)	1894–95	1894–95	1	16	13	8.00	0	0	–	–	–	–	–	1	0	
Aub Carrigan	(Australia)	1945–46	1951–52	50	2883	169	35.59	4	20	31	4/95	47.06	–	–	21	0	
Lee Carseldine	(Australia)	1998–99	2010–11	47	2298	152	34.29	3	13	14	3/25	47.57	–	–	51	0	
Jerry Cassell	(Australia)	1996–97	2001–02	14	585	136	26.59	1	2	–	–	–	–	–	9	0	
Henry Chapman	(Australia)	1895–96	1901–02	2	38	22*	12.66	0	0	–	–	–	–	–	1	1	
Lawrence Chapman	(Australia)	1949–50	1951–52	7	123	38	17.57	0	0	10	3/76	36.20	–	–	3	0	
Greg Chappell	(Australia)	1973–74	1983–84	60	5872	194	69.08	21	23	60	4/28	28.92	–	–	76	0	
John Childe-Freeman	(Australia)	1955–56	1961–62	28	265	55*	16.56	0	1	52	6/134	44.21	2	–	5	0	
Chilla Christ	(Australia)	1937–38	1946–47	24	179	32	6.88	0	0	56	5/47	42.64	1	–	17	0	
Jim Christy	(South Africa)	1934–35	1935–36	7	310	80	25.83	0	2	4	2/30	24.50	–	–	4	0	
John Clark	(Australia)	1952–53	1952–53	2	13	8*	13.00	0	0	5	5/61	22.60	–	–	1	0	
James Clark	(Australia)	1898–99	1899–1900	2	14	8	3.50	0	0	–	–	–	–	–	1	0	
Gordon Clem	(Australia)	1932–33	1932–33	1	9	7*	9.00	0	0	1	1/107	107.00	–	–	0	0	
Peter Clifford	(Australia)	1986–87	1990–91	21	996	114	29.29	2	5	–	–	–	–	–	19	0	
Jim Coats	(Australia)	1937–38	1937–38	3	127	46	21.16	0	0	–	–	–	–	–	0	0	
James Cockburn	(Australia)	1936–37	1936–37	2	43	35	10.75	0	0	1	1/47	148.00	–	–	0	0	
Arthur Coningham	(Australia)	1893–94	1895–96	4	289	151	36.13	1	1	23	5/68	23.83	2	–	2	0	
Bernard Cook	(Australia)	1909–10	1912–13	7	61	23	6.10	0	0	20	5/34	18.00	1	–	4	0	
Geoff Cook	(Australia)	1931–32	1947–48	68	3453	169*	29.76	3	19	125	6/94	35.50	2	–	33	0	
Colin Cooke	(Australia)	1976–77	1976–77	5	2	1*	0.66	0	0	17	4/59	30.35	–	–	0	0	
George Cooper	(Australia)	1929–30	1930–31	2	45	22	15.00	0	0	–	–	–	–	–	1	0	
John Cooper	(Australia)	1956–57	1956–57	1	30	23	15.00	0	0	–	–	–	–	–	0	0	
Lewis Cooper	(Australia)	1958–59	1967–68	34	462	32*	14.00	0	0	–	–	–	–	–	84	18	
Gary Cosier	(Australia)	1977–78	1979–80	26	1422	113	33.07	1	8	23	4/57	31.96	–	–	25	0	
Charles Cossart	(Australia)	1913–14	1913–14	1	0	0	0.00	0	0	–	–	–	–	–	1	0	
Andrew Courtice	(Australia)	1982–83	1987–88	49	2758	144	34.91	4	18	1	1/42	237.00	–	–	37	0	
Owen Cowley	(Australia)	1896–97	1896–97	4	166	135	33.20	1	0	–	–	–	–	–	2	0	
Douglas Cox	(Australia)	1940–41	1940–41	1	30	16	15.00	0	0	3	3/63	45.33	–	–	0	0	
Bob Crane	(Australia)	1965–66	1967–68	23	995	98	24.26	0	7	32	5/42	40.12	1	–	35	0	
Brendan Creevey	(Australia)	1996–97	2000–01	12	241	52	18.53	0	1	31	6/70	30.00	3	–	4	0	
Ernest Cresswick	(Australia)	1894–95	1895–96	2	31	21	7.75	0	0	–	–	–	–	–	1	0	
Edward Crouch	(Australia)	1892–93	1909–10	17	556	67	17.93	0	4	7	2/3	23.71	–	–	8	0	
George Crouch	(Australia)	1903–04	1905–06	5	258	68	25.80	0	1	–	–	–	–	–	5	0	
Ernest Currie	(New Zealand)	1899–1900	1899–1900	1	14	8	7.00	0	0	–	–	–	–	–	0	0	
Ben Cutting	(Australia)	2007–08	2016–17	47	1434	109	22.76	1	6	158	6/37	27.54	6	–	13	0	
Adam Dale	(Australia)	1996–97	2002–03	48	858	55	16.82	0	1	202	7/33	21.77	10	1	13	0	
Ian Davis	(Australia)	1975–76	1975–76	9	428	61	30.57	0	2	–	–	–	–	–	2	0	
Joe Dawes	(Australia)	1997–98	2005–06	76	616	34*	10.62	0	0	285	7/67	25.38	11	2	12	0	
Keith de Jong	(Australia)	1981–82	1981–82	4	100	41	14.28	0	0	5	2/71	40.20	–	–	2	0	
Tony Dell	(Australia)	1970–71	1974–75	33	140	13*	5.19	0	0	108	6/26	28.25	4	1	14	0	
Les Dixon	(Australia)	1936–37	1945–46	30	297	29	9.58	0	0	83	5/66	34.39	1	–	20	0	
Troy Dixon	(Australia)	1993–94	1999–2000	11	521	122	24.80	1	1	–	–	–	–	–	8	0	
**Brendan Doggett**	(Australia)	2017–18	2020–21	13	152	43*	10.85	0	0	38	5/77	35.10	2	–	6	0	
Keith Dollery	(Australia)	1947–48	1947–48	2	3	2	1.00	0	0	–	–	–	–	–	0	0	
Sydney Donahoo	(Australia)	1896–97	1896–97	6	295	70	29.50	0	2	–	–	–	–	–	4	0	
Daniel Doran	(Australia)	2005–06	2009–10	32	567	61	17.71	0	1	43	3/33	63.74	–	–	9	0	
Joseph Downey	(Australia)	1912–13	1914–15	9	66	13	6.00	0	0	26	7/98	34.38	1	–	6	0	
Jack Draney	(Australia)	1949–50	1949–50	2	37	29	12.33	0	0	–	–	–	–	–	2	0	
Isaac Drape	(Australia)	1893–94	1893–94	1	2	2	1.00	0	0	–	–	–	–	–	0	0	
Peter Drinnen	(Australia)	1988–89	1989–90	5	164	74	32.80	0	1	–	–	–	–	–	16	0	
Lance Druery	(Australia)	1949–50	1949–50	2	11	6	3.66	0	0	6	3/85	36.33	–	–	1	0	
Keith Dudgeon	(Australia)	1967–68	1974–75	41	1576	85	22.84	0	9	15	2/14	24.33	–	–	19	0	
Ross Duncan	(Australia)	1967–68	1974–75	57	543	52	8.90	0	1	185	8/55	31.11	7	1	30	0	
William Duncan	(Australia)	1930–31	1930–31	1	3	3	1.50	0	0	–	–	–	–	–	4	0	
Ben Dunk	(Australia)	2010–11	2010–11	6	124	35	15.50	0	0	–	–	–	–	–	2	0	
Martin Dunn	(Australia)	1905–06	1907–08	4	53	19	6.62	0	0	–	–	–	–	–	1	0	
Geoff Dymock	(Australia)	1971–72	1981–82	79	1049	101*	15.66	1	2	275	6/79	27.45	6	–	33	0	
Peter Easton	(Australia)	1959–60	1959–60	1	12	12	12.00	0	0	–	–	–	–	–	2	0	
**Blake Edwards**	(Australia)	2019–20	2019–20	1	9	8	4.50	0	0	4	2/28	23.00	–	–	0	0	
Grahame Egan	(Australia)	1963–64	1964–65	6	101	24	11.22	0	0	9	4/100	53.77	–	–	0	0	
David Ellis	(Australia)	1973–74	1973–74	1	2	2	1.00	0	0	1	1/42	48.00	–	–	0	0	
John Ellis	(Australia)	1938–39	1947–48	25	195	26	8.12	0	0	76	7/86	32.43	4	–	15	0	
William Evans	(Australia)	1898–99	1913–14	30	1132	103*	22.64	1	6	8	7/70	15.25	1	–	24	16	
John Farquhar	(Australia)	1913–14	1926–27	16	322	46	13.41	0	0	–	–	–	–	–	15	16	
Steve Farrell	(Australia)	2003–04	2003–04	2	91	49	22.75	0	0	–	–	–	–	–	0	0	
Thomas Faunce	(Australia)	1905–06	1906–07	4	141	37	20.14	0	0	–	–	–	–	–	2	0	
Luke Feldman	(Australia)	2008–09	2018–19	63	741	52	16.46	0	1	232	6/32	25.94	8	–	24	0	
Sidney Fennelly	(Australia)	1909–10	1920–21	21	1076	131	27.58	1	6	1	1/52	114.00	–	–	11	0	
Frederick Fett	(Australia)	1909–10	1911–12	2	3	2	0.75	0	0	1	1/58	92.00	–	–	0	0	
Henry Fewin	(Australia)	1929–30	1929–30	1	18	11	9.00	0	0	–	–	–	–	–	0	0	
Alexander Fisher	(Australia)	1934–35	1935–36	3	70	26	11.66	0	0	4	2/103	75.00	–	–	1	0	
Barry Fisher	(Australia)	1954–55	1967–68	56	1369	103	21.06	1	5	126	6/41	32.15	4	–	26	0	
William Fisher	(Australia)	1892–93	1893–94	2	40	11	10.00	0	0	–	–	–	–	–	1	0	
Gavin Fitness	(Australia)	1994–95	1994–95	3	100	71	25.00	0	1	–	–	–	–	–	10	1	
James Fitzgerald	(Australia)	1902–03	1904–05	8	148	24	9.86	0	0	9	3/52	42.55	–	–	5	0	
Shawn Flegler	(Australia)	1994–95	1994–95	1	16	16	8.00	0	0	–	–	–	–	–	0	0	
John H. Fletcher	(Australia)	1919–20	1919–20	1	29	29	14.50	0	0	4	3/65	30.00	–	–	0	0	
John W. Fletcher	(Australia)	1909–10	1909–10	3	97	47	16.16	0	0	–	–	–	–	–	2	0	
Jason Floros	(Australia)	2010–11	2016–17	16	524	82	22.78	0	3	26	4/57	44.46	–	–	17	0	
Brian Flynn	(Australia)	1952–53	1955–56	15	430	54	21.50	0	2	48	8/148	38.70	3	2	13	0	
Geoff Foley	(Australia)	1989–90	1999–2000	63	2828	155	31.08	2	16	42	5/25	52.71	1	–	71	0	
Peter Forrest	(Australia)	2011–12	2016–17	43	2417	155*	35.54	7	9	–	–	–	–	–	62	0	
Norman Foster	(Australia)	1898–99	1905–06	9	341	131	18.94	1	0	–	–	–	–	–	7	0	
Malcolm Francke	(Sri Lanka)	1956–57	1985–86	46	499	36	9.78	0	0	138	6/62	31.55	5	–	19	0	
Neville Fraser	(Australia)	1950–51	1950–51	2	16	12*	–	0	0	2	1/43	82.50	–	–	0	0	
Harry Freeman	(Australia)	1893–94	1894–95	3	122	65	20.33	0	1	–	–	–	–	–	1	0	
Harry Frei	(Germany)	1982–83	1986–87	37	489	57	13.21	0	1	91	6/52	38.00	2	–	19	0	
Matthew Gale	(Australia)	2011–12	2013–14	7	51	18	5.66	0	0	22	5/81	31.04	1	–	2	0	
Ian Gallagher	(Australia)	1982–83	1982–83	1	6	3	3.00	0	0	2	1/30	31.50	–	–	0	0	
Herbert Gamble	(Australia)	1931–32	1933–34	13	131	24	6.55	0	0	30	6/115	41.70	1	–	10	0	
Cameron Gannon	(United States)	2010–11	2019–20	30	419	45	11.97	0	0	103	6/53	25.11	3	–	21	0	
Mark Gaskell	(Australia)	1977–78	1982–83	16	552	43	18.40	0	0	–	–	–	–	–	6	0	
Peter George	(Australia)	2014–15	2018–19	23	47	10*	3.13	0	0	73	5/78	29.88	2	–	2	0	
Eddie Gilbert	(Australia)	1930–31	1935–36	23	224	34*	7.22	0	0	87	6/64	28.97	6	–	4	0	
Les Gill	(Australia)	1926–27	1927–28	7	337	54	28.08	0	1	8	3/89	71.38	–	–	5	0	
Peter Goggin	(Australia)	1990–91	1992–93	21	877	120	25.79	1	3	–	–	–	–	–	19	0	
Arthur Goldman	(Australia)	1892–93	1892–93	1	11	10	5.50	0	0	–	–	–	–	–	0	0	
Victor Goodwin	(Australia)	1929–30	1930–31	9	552	93	32.47	0	6	2	1/0	48.00	–	–	0	0	
George Gooma	(Australia)	1939–40	1939–40	2	3	2	0.75	0	0	2	1/27	79.50	–	–	0	0	
Frank Gough	(Australia)	1924–25	1932–33	40	1779	137	24.70	2	11	10	3/100	92.30	–	–	23	0	
John Govan	(Australia)	1932–33	1937–38	7	125	24*	15.62	0	0	13	3/59	50.00	–	–	0	0	
Brian Grace	(Australia)	1967–68	1971–72	7	136	36	12.36	0	0	–	–	–	–	–	3	0	
Norman Grant	(Australia)	1926–27	1926–27	1	62	36	31.00	0	0	2	2/107	53.50	–	–	3	0	
Tom Graveney	(England)	1969–70	1971–72	6	134	56	19.14	0	1	–	–	–	–	–	3	1	
Geoff Gray	(Australia)	1968–69	1969–70	6	195	43	17.72	0	0	–	–	–	–	–	2	0	
Ernest Grew	(England)	1892–93	1892–93	1	3	3	1.50	0	0	2	1/4	8.50	–	–	1	0	
Harold Griffith	(Australia)	1902–03	1904–05	5	69	28	6.90	0	0	12	3/34	34.66	–	–	4	0	
Charles Griffith	(Australia)	1913–14	1923–24	4	20	13*	5.00	0	0	12	6/71	28.00	1	1	0	0	
Wally Grout	(Australia)	1946–47	1965–66	92	3277	119	24.46	3	17	–	–	–	–	–	224	60	
William Gumley	(Australia)	1948–49	1948–49	2	4	4	1.00	0	0	–	–	–	–	–	0	0	
Gil Gunthorpe	(Australia)	1935–36	1936–37	2	69	46	17.25	0	0	–	–	–	–	–	2	0	
Mossie Guttormsen	(Australia)	1936–37	1938–39	4	56	23*	9.33	0	0	–	–	–	–	–	4	0	
Jim Hackett	(Australia)	1937–38	1937–38	2	10	10	5.00	0	0	–	–	–	–	–	1	0	
David Hale	(Australia)	1963–64	1965–66	8	158	50	17.55	0	1	8	3/85	66.62	–	–	3	0	
Wes Hall	(Barbados)	1961–62	1962–63	17	409	50	17.78	0	1	76	7/76	26.29	4	–	9	0	
Andrew Hammelmann	(Australia)	1990–91	1990–91	1	1	1	1.00	0	0	–	–	–	–	–	0	0	
Cecil Hanify	(Australia)	1912–13	1912–13	1	27	18	13.50	0	0	2	2/52	26.00	–	–	0	0	
Des Hansen	(Australia)	1931–32	1939–40	30	1232	147	24.64	1	7	–	–	–	–	–	13	0	
Gil Hardcastle	(Australia)	1935–36	1935–36	1	2	1	1.00	0	0	1	1/51	51.00	–	–	13	0	
Ryan Harris	(Australia)	2008–09	2014–15	23	558	84	20.67	0	4	101	7/60	23.39	3	–	14	0	
James Harten	(Australia)	1949–50	1949–50	2	30	16	10.00	0	0	–	–	–	–	–	3	0	
Roger Hartigan	(Australia)	1905–06	1920–21	17	1143	104	34.64	1	11	9	3/27	36.56	–	–	11	0	
Chris Hartley	(Australia)	2003–04	2015–16	131	6138	142*	34.48	10	33	–	–	–	–	–	548	17	
Mick Harvey	(Australia)	1949–50	1956–57	34	1625	111	28.51	3	8	–	–	–	–	–	34	0	
Nathan Hauritz	(Australia)	2001–02	2013–14	38	748	94	17.81	0	1	74	5/135	48.30	1	–	19	0	
Matthew Hayden	(Australia)	1991–92	2007–08	101	8831	234	56.02	27	39	3	2/17	47.33	–	–	95	0	
William Hayes	(Australia)	1904–05	1911–12	17	618	98	19.31	0	2	44	6/125	34.31	2	–	16	0	
Ian Healy	(Australia)	1986–87	1998–99	55	2199	90	35.47	0	13	–	–	–	–	–	183	12	
Ken Healy	(Australia)	1990–91	1990–91	1	8	5	4.00	0	0	1	1/33	33.00	–	–	1	0	
**Sam Heazlett**	(Australia)	2015–16	2019–20	39	2015	135	30.53	4	9	–	–	–	–	–	36	0	
Urban Heffernan	(Australia)	1924–25	1924–25	2	20	20	6.66	0	0	–	–	–	–	–	0	0	
**Charlie Hemphrey**	(England)	2014–15	2019–20	38	1967	118	29.80	4	11	6	2/56	73.33	–	–	28	0	
Albert Henry	(Australia)	1901–02	1904–05	7	36	9	6.00	0	0	21	5/40	32.04	1	–	3	0	
Scott Henry	(Australia)	2015–16	2015–16	5	281	141	31.22	1	1	–	–	–	–	–	3	0	
Brett Henschell	(Australia)	1981–82	1990–91	66	2720	162	29.56	5	13	87	5/60	43.96	2	–	38	0	
Albert Hewitt	(Australia)	1897–98	1899–1900	2	16	11	16.00	0	0	4	2/54	34.75	–	–	1	0	
Graeme Hick	(England)	1990–91	1990–91	11	904	155	47.58	3	4	–	–	–	–	–	13	0	
Roy Higgins	(Australia)	1925–26	1931–32	20	814	179	23.94	1	3	–	–	–	–	–	3	0	
James Higgins	(Australia)	1898–99	1898–99	1	16	10	8.00	0	0	–	–	–	–	–	0	0	
John Hill	(Australia)	1986–87	1986–87	7	88	30	22.00	0	0	13	3/16	39.00	–	–	2	0	
Leon Hill	(Australia)	1962–63	1962–63	2	60	41	15.00	0	0	2	1/25	64.00	–	–	4	0	
Oswould Hitchcock	(Australia)	1894–95	1896–97	6	41	12*	8.20	0	0	–	–	–	–	–	2	5	
William Hoare	(Australia)	1892–93	1902–03	14	289	56	13.13	0	1	37	6/12	18.16	3	–	12	0	
James Hogg	(Australia)	1926–27	1931–32	5	259	71	25.90	0	1	–	–	–	–	–	3	0	
Trevor Hohns	(Australia)	1972–73	1990–91	116	4174	103	27.10	2	24	214	6/56	38.91	9	1	66	0	
Vic Honour	(Australia)	1935–36	1935–36	6	147	34	14.70	0	0	–	–	–	–	–	3	0	
James Hopes	(Australia)	2001–02	2015–16	105	5078	122	30.41	3	34	296	6/40	26.91	11	–	48	0	
Percy Hornibrook	(Australia)	1919–20	1933–34	27	379	36	11.48	0	0	94	8/60	31.09	4	1	23	0	
Edward Hubbard	(Australia)	1929–30	1931–32	4	163	65	23.28	0	1	4	2/42	22.50	–	–	3	0	
Desmond Hughson	(Australia)	1959–60	1968–69	14	426	59	19.36	0	2	–	–	–	–	–	9	0	
Alec Hurwood	(Australia)	1925–26	1931–32	18	378	89	13.03	0	2	67	6/80	30.75	4	1	13	0	
Ernest Hutcheon	(Australia)	1919–20	1925–26	7	188	71	17.09	0	1	–	–	–	–	–	8	0	
John Hutcheon	(Australia)	1905–06	1910–11	12	599	73	24.95	0	4	–	–	–	–	–	15	0	
Ernest Hutton	(Australia)	1893–94	1893–94	1	35	31	17.50	0	0	–	–	–	–	–	1	0	
Brad Inwood	(Australia)	1986–87	1989–90	7	232	66	33.14	0	2	4	1/9	33.00	–	–	2	0	
Bert Ironmonger	(Australia)	1909–10	1913–14	5	29	11	4.83	0	0	16	5/158	33.25	1	–	1	0	
Keith Jack	(Australia)	1948–49	1952–53	25	1104	86	26.92	0	7	1	1/5	15.00	–	–	10	0	
Paul Jackson	(Australia)	1992–93	1998–99	66	750	49	14.71	0	0	142	5/65	39.70	2	–	16	0	
Neville Jelich	(Socialist Federal Republic of Yugoslavia)	1985–86	1985–86	1	30	30	30.00	0	0	–	–	–	–	–	0	0	
Claude Jennings	(Australia)	1910–11	1911–12	5	411	123	41.10	1	2	–	–	–	–	–	8	0	
Len Johnson	(Australia)	1946–47	1952–53	46	902	75	15.55	0	1	177	7/43	24.76	13	1	26	0	
Mitchell Johnson	(Australia)	2001–02	2007–08	20	477	54	25.11	0	3	65	6/51	31.22	2	1	1	0	
Arthur Jones	(Australia)	1896–97	1910–11	3	90	67	18.00	0	1	–	–	–	–	–	0	0	
Alan Jones	(Australia)	1971–72	1976–77	19	844	130	22.81	1	4	8	3/45	27.87	–	–	12	0	
Sammy Jones	(Australia)	1896–97	1899–1900	8	383	85	27.36	0	2	–	–	–	–	–	3	0	
Bob Joyce	(Australia)	1969–70	1972–73	16	521	86*	20.03	0	4	11	3/44	39.63	–	–	9	0	
Shane Jurgensen	(Australia)	2003–04	2006–07	4	7	5	1.75	0	0	14	4/52	25.43	–	–	1	0	
Lance Kahler	(Australia)	1997–98	1997–98	2	32	24	8.00	0	0	–	–	–	–	–	1	0	
Alvin Kallicharran	(Guyana)	1977–78	1977–78	7	402	129*	30.92	1	2	–	–	–	–	–	9	0	
Michael Kasprowicz	(Australia)	1989–90	2007–08	115	1743	52*	15.16	0	2	505	8/44	24.44	31	3	43	0	
William Kay	(Australia)	1919–20	1920–21	3	10	7	5.00	0	0	17	7/194	30.35	2	–	1	0	
Ian Kelly	(Australia)	1980–81	1981–82	4	53	31	10.60	0	0	–	–	–	–	–	1	0	
Alex Kemp	(Australia)	2011–12	2012–13	6	135	47	15.00	0	0	–	–	–	–	–	9	0	
Martin Kent	(Australia)	1974–75	1981–82	47	2621	171	36.40	5	14	–	–	–	–	–	41	0	
Robbie Kerr	(Australia)	1981–82	1989–90	80	5079	201*	39.07	15	25	1	1/12	16.00	–	–	79	0	
Darryl King	(Australia)	1962–63	1966–67	8	310	66	25.83	0	3	–	–	–	–	–	3	0	
Ian King	(Australia)	1969–70	1969–70	8	65	13*	8.12	0	0	30	6/70	28.36	–	–	2	0	
Darren Kingdon	(Australia)	1992–93	1993–94	7	176	59	17.60	0	1	–	–	–	–	–	7	0	
Eric Knowles	(Australia)	1925–26	1928–29	4	267	144	33.37	1	0	–	–	–	–	–	2	0	
Nick Kruger	(Australia)	2002–03	2009–10	17	838	172	28.90	1	3	–	–	–	–	–	2	0	
**Marnus Labuschagne**	(Australia)	2014–15	2020–21	50	3050	167	34.65	6	18	24	3/85	51.58	–	–	47	0	
Errold La Frantz	(Australia)	1941–42	1941–42	1	13	7	6.50	0	0	–	–	–	–	–	0	0	
Jeffrey Langley	(Australia)	1974–75	1979–80	22	878	117	24.39	2	2	–	–	–	–	–	22	0	
Ben Laughlin	(Australia)	2007–08	2010–11	6	55	35	13.75	0	0	10	2/55	60.30	–	–	3	0	
Rupert Law	(Australia)	1912–13	1912–13	2	65	50*	21.66	0	1	1	1/39	76.00	–	–	1	0	
Stuart Law	(Australia)	1988–89	2003–04	158	9920	216	43.13	25	53	57	5/39	46.39	1	–	144	0	
Rodney Lawrence	(Australia)	1974–75	1982–83	8	198	48	13.20	0	0	–	–	–	–	–	4	0	
John Leary	(Australia)	1898–99	1898–99	1	2	2*	2.00	0	0	1	1/45	45.00	–	–	0	0	
Scott Ledger	(Australia)	1972–73	1972–73	2	43	26	14.33	0	0	–	–	–	–	–	1	0	
Henry Leeson	(Australia)	1929–30	1934–35	14	251	52	12.55	0	1	–	–	–	–	–	21	6	
Ryan Le Loux	(Australia)	2004–05	2014–15	3	107	63	21.40	0	1	2	1/46	–	–	–	0	0	
Raydon Levingston	(Australia)	1971–72	1971–72	1	2	2	1.00	0	0	–	–	–	–	–	0	0	
Roy Levy	(Australia)	1928–29	1935–36	25	1510	148	33.55	3	7	13	3/44	54.69	–	–	27	0	
John Lewis	(Australia)	1894–95	1911–12	18	363	43	12.10	0	0	31	6/37	26.00	1	–	11	0	
Jack Lihou	(Australia)	1955–56	1964–65	26	115	25	5.22	0	0	50	3/28	50.34	–	–	16	0	
Dennis Lillie	(Australia)	1965–66	1981–82	17	135	29	8.43	0	0	33	5/48	51.06	1	–	6	0	
Ray Lindwall	(Australia)	1954–55	1959–60	34	903	93	29.13	0	6	115	7/92	23.76	6	–	23	0	
Lewis Litster	(Australia)	1927–28	1932–33	10	407	82	22.61	0	3	1	1/10	25.00	–	–	2	0	
George Lockie	(Australia)	1945–46	1945–46	4	97	26	19.40	0	0	–	–	–	–	–	5	0	
Tasman Long	(Australia)	1896–97	1904–05	4	19	14	4.75	0	0	7	3/67	28.57	–	–	1	0	
Martin Love	(Australia)	1992–93	2008–09	151	11224	300*	46.00	31	46	1	1/5	11.00	–	–	172	0	
Colin Loxton	(Australia)	1937–38	1937–38	4	61	25	7.63	0	0	6	2/27	34.33	–	–	4	0	
John Loxton	(Australia)	1966–67	1970–71	22	1081	125	25.13	2	5	–	–	–	–	–	28	0	
Mike Lucas	(Australia)	1968–69	1974–75	19	737	107	19.91	1	3	–	–	–	–	–	7	0	
Chris Lynn	(Australia)	2009–10	2016–17	38	2546	250	42.43	5	11	–	–	–	–	–	23	0	
Rodney Lyons	(Australia)	1955–56	1958–59	19	826	102	28.48	1	5	–	–	–	–	–	13	0	
John McAndrew	(Australia)	1914–15	1924–25	11	173	36*	13.30	0	0	38	7/51	27.97	2	–	4	0	
Michael McCaffrey	(Australia)	1905–06	1911–12	5	81	31	8.10	0	0	17	5/204	35.52	1	–	5	0	
Jack McCarthy	(Australia)	1935–36	1940–41	2	71	38	17.75	0	0	1	1/44	112.00	–	–	2	0	
William McCloy	(Australia)	1910–11	1918–19	4	67	17	8.38	0	0	5	2/92	43.20	–	–	8	0	
Colin McCool	(Australia)	1945–46	1952–53	43	1983	172	29.60	2	8	159	7/106	33.60	11	–	51	0	
Clarence McCoombe	(Australia)	1928–29	1928–29	5	400	112	40.00	1	4	–	–	–	–	–	2	0	
**Alister McDermott**	(Australia)	2009–10	2014–15	20	225	41	13.23	0	0	75	7/24	24.77	2	–	3	0	
Ben McDermott	(Australia)	2014–15	2014–15	1	2	2	1.00	0	0	–	–	–	–	–	3	0	
Craig McDermott	(Australia)	1983–84	1995–96	77	1590	74	19.16	0	5	329	8/44	26.05	22	2	27	0	
Robert MacDonald	(Australia)	1893–94	1903–04	14	756	114	36.00	1	6	–	–	–	–	–	9	0	
Ronan McDonald	(Australia)	2012–13	2012–13	2	29	18	14.50	0	0	5	2/134	40.40	–	–	3	0	
Pudger McDonald	(Australia)	1924–25	1924–25	2	26	18	8.67	0	0	3	2/7	29.33	–	–	0	0	
Percy McDonnell	(Australia)	1894–95	1895–96	3	148	65	24.67	0	1	–	–	–	–	–	3	0	
Clement McFarlane	(Australia)	1924–25	1930–31	3	15	7	3.00	0	0	–	–	–	–	–	9	0	
Robert McGhee	(Australia)	1990–91	1990–91	4	25	14*	12.50	0	0	9	3/83	43.77	–	–	1	0	
Albert McGinn	(Australia)	1941–42	1947–48	4	8	5	4.00	0	0	8	3/42	35.37	–	–	1	0	
Wally McGlinchey	(Australia)	1893–94	1899–1900	12	314	45	14.95	0	0	–	–	–	–	–	4	0	
**Nathan McSweeney**	(Australia)	2018–19	2019–20	5	126	35	14.00	0	0	2	2/37	21.00	–	–	2	0	
John Mackay	(Australia)	1959–60	1966–67	47	1148	77	19.79	0	2	115	5/56	31.82	–	–	3	0	
Ken Mackay	(Australia)	1946–47	1963–64	107	6843	223	47.19	16	34	132	5/15	35.93	5	–	48	0	
Damien MacKenzie	(Australia)	2001–02	2003–04	5	67	30	13.40	0	0	14	4/43	23.71	–	–	1	0	
John McLaren	(Australia)	1906–07	1914–15	17	387	43*	16.13	0	0	59	5/55	29.49	2	–	5	0	
Jack McLaughlin	(Australia)	1949–50	1962–63	59	2988	146	33.95	4	16	1	1/31	130.00	–	–	24	0	
John Maclean	(Australia)	1968–69	1978–79	86	3244	156	24.58	1	0	–	–	–	–	–	286	28	
John McMahon	(Australia)	1959–60	1959–60	2	8	4	2.66	0	0	1	1/92	185.00	–	–	1	0	
Vincent McMahon	(Australia)	1946–47	1946–47	1	10	10	10.00	0	0	1	1/23	32.00	–	–	0	0	
James Maddern	(Australia)	1932–33	1936–37	5	51	11	5.10	0	0	–	–	–	–	–	4	0	
Garry Madders	(Australia)	1979–80	1979–80	3	72	20*	72.00	0	0	–	–	–	–	–	10	0	
Charles Maddock	(Australia)	1919–20	1919–20	2	17	13	8.50	0	0	1	1/41	145.00	–	–	2	0	
Steve Magoffin	(Australia)	2011–12	2011–12	6	175	46*	25.00	0	0	23	6/44	16.61	1	–	4	0	
John Maguire	(Australia)	1977–78	1988–89	68	557	61	9.28	0	1	191	6/48	32.48	8	1	22	0	
Jimmy Maher	(Australia)	1993–94	2007–08	155	9933	223	39.57	19	49	10	3/11	41.20	–	–	164	0	
Hector Mahoney	(Australia)	1937–38	1937–38	3	12	8	4.00	0	0	–	–	–	–	–	0	0	
Michael Mainhardt	(Australia)	1980–81	1982–83	3	6	5	6.00	0	0	3	1/20	86.00	–	–	1	0	
Majid Khan	(Pakistan)	1973–74	1973–74	9	496	107	31.00	2	2	4	2/24	35.75	–	–	16	0	
Michael Maranta	(Australia)	1982–83	1985–86	3	4	4	4.00	0	0	–	–	–	–	–	2	0	
Albert Marsden	(Australia)	1919–20	1920–21	5	57	37	7.12	0	0	–	–	–	–	–	1	0	
Alan Marshal	(Australia)	1903–04	1913–14	11	462	66*	23.10	0	4	6	2/24	54.33	–	–	14	0	
Angus Marshall	(Australia)	1929–30	1932–33	4	77	33	12.83	0	0	–	–	–	–	–	2	0	
Charles Martin	(Australia)	1892–93	1893–94	2	50	42*	16.66	0	0	–	–	–	–	–	1	0	
Alexander Mayes	(Australia)	1925–26	1927–28	7	248	70	22.55	0	1	17	4/53	43.35	–	–	4	0	
Charles Mengel	(Australia)	1957–58	1957–58	6	217	74	24.11	0	1	6	3/26	26.16	–	–	2	0	
Evelyn Metcalfe	(England)	1894–95	1898–99	2	53	26*	17.66	0	0	1	1/2	21.00	–	–	0	0	
Dom Michael	(Samoa)	2012–13	2013–14	5	159	46	17.67	0	0	–	–	–	–	–	1	0	
Robert Mihell	(Australia)	1957–58	1960–61	12	322	45	16.94	0	0	–	–	–	–	–	3	0	
Simon Milenko	(Australia)	2014–15	2014–15	3	77	54	25.67	0	1	8	5/15	12.00	1	–	1	0	
David Miller	(Australia)	1896–97	1905–06	7	73	21	7.30	0	0	8	5/46	31.88	1	–	4	0	
Mick Miller	(Australia)	1998–99	1998–99	2	63	33	21.00	0	0	–	–	–	–	–	4	0	
Greg Moller	(Australia)	2006–07	2014–15	21	922	120	24.26	1	3	–	–	–	–	–	11	0	
Stephen Monty	(Australia)	1990–91	1990–91	11	508	100*	25.40	1	1	–	–	–	–	–	12	0	
Stanley Moore	(Australia)	1920–21	1920–21	2	30	26	10.00	0	0	–	–	–	–	–	12	0	
Charles Morgan	(Australia)	1899–1900	1905–06	7	187	42	13.35	0	0	–	–	–	–	–	3	0	
Sandy Morgan	(Australia)	1965–66	1969–70	37	1410	81	25.17	0	6	113	6/42	28.90	6	–	28	0	
Wayne Morgan	(Australia)	1979–80	1980–81	5	274	61	39.14	0	2	–	–	–	–	–	2	0	
William Morris	(Australia)	1945–46	1949–50	34	1987	162*	34.85	5	9	–	–	–	–	–	7	0	
Gilbert Morton	(Australia)	1904–05	1905–06	4	215	135*	30.71	1	1	–	–	–	–	–	1	0	
Kenneth Mossop	(Australia)	1929–30	1932–33	14	532	66	22.16	0	3	2	2/15	20.50	–	–	8	0	
Matthew Mott	(Australia)	1994–95	1997–98	15	787	150	30.26	1	4	–	–	–	–	–	13	0	
Donald Muddle	(Australia)	1956–57	1960–61	11	236	37*	19.66	0	0	11	3/71	73.00	–	–	2	0	
Arthur Muhl	(Australia)	1935–36	1935–36	2	24	16	8.00	0	0	2	1/48	85.00	–	–	0	0	
Scott Muller	(Australia)	1990–91	1999–2000	27	201	26	9.57	0	0	88	5/35	23.31	3	–	10	0	
William Munro	(England)	1892–93	1892–93	1	4	4*	4.00	0	0	3	3/13	4.33	–	–	1	0	
Brendan Nash	(Cricket West Indies)	2000–01	2006–07	29	1333	176	27.77	3	4	1	1/22	32.00	–	–	15	0	
**Michael Neser**	(Australia)	2010–11	2020–21	48	1720	121	27.30	1	11	166	6/57	25.53	3	–	21	0	
Warwick Neville	(Australia)	1971–72	1971–72	2	38	26	9.50	0	0	2	1/54	63.50	–	–	0	0	
Ashley Noffke	(Australia)	1999–2000	2008–09	71	2528	114*	28.09	2	11	252	6/24	27.29	13	–	32	0	
Frank Nolan	(Australia)	1948–49	1949–50	3	19	11	6.33	0	0	8	4/87	25.37	–	–	3	0	
Otto Nothling	(Australia)	1927–28	1929–30	13	650	121	27.08	1	5	27	5/39	38.33	2	–	12	0	
Harold Noyes	(Australia)	1924–25	1926–27	6	165	53*	23.57	0	1	18	6/48	37.11	1	–	2	0	
Aaron Nye	(Australia)	2003–04	2007–08	8	380	102	29.23	1	2	5	2/89	35.00	–	–	9	0	
Robert O'Brien	(Australia)	1892–93	1896–97	4	80	48	11.42	0	0	5	3/40	44.80	–	–	3	0	
Brian O'Connor	(Australia)	1934–35	1935–36	5	83	20	11.85	0	0	6	2/72	75.00	–	–	2	0	
Leo O'Connor	(Australia)	1912–13	1929–30	46	3311	196	39.89	9	13	–	–	–	–	–	82	21	
David Ogilvie	(Australia)	1974–75	1979–80	32	1742	168*	32.87	5	5	–	–	–	–	–	26	0	
Scott O'Leary	(Australia)	2000–01	2000–01	7	42	19	10.50	0	0	9	4/105	63.11	–	–	5	0	
Bruce Oxenford	(Australia)	1991–92	1992–93	8	112	37	12.44	0	0	18	5/91	52.72	1	–	11	0	
Ian Oxenford	(Australia)	1958–59	1959–60	12	586	72	29.30	0	5	–	–	–	–	–	5	0	
Lionel Oxenham	(Australia)	1919–20	1927–28	23	1055	119	24.53	1	6	1	1/19	88.00	–	–	10	0	
Ron Oxenham	(Australia)	1911–12	1936–37	70	3082	162*	27.27	4	17	228	6/45	22.90	10	2	31	0	
Clive Page	(Australia)	1921–22	1921–22	1	65	35	32.50	0	0	–	–	–	–	–	1	0	
Alec Parker	(Australia)	1979–80	1981–82	9	264	52*	20.30	0	1	–	–	–	–	–	5	0	
Robert Parker	(Australia)	1967–68	1971–72	25	1003	108	21.80	1	6	2	1/12	43.50	–	–	10	0	
Matthew Pascoe	(Australia)	1998–99	2000–01	2	120	62	60.00	0	1	4	3/67	34.75	–	–	1	0	
Charles Patrick	(Australia)	1901–02	1903–04	5	203	61	20.30	0	2	–	–	–	–	–	1	0	
Bob Paulsen	(Australia)	1966–67	1971–72	43	636	46	11.36	0	0	115	7/73	37.03	4	–	31	0	
Steve Paulsen	(Australia)	2011–12	2011–12	3	135	90*	33.75	0	1	–	–	–	–	–	1	0	
Daniel Payne	(Australia)	2001–02	2003–04	10	256	55	14.22	0	1	1	1/6	6.00	–	–	7	0	
Mark Peachey	(Australia)	1928–29	1928–29	1	35	30	17.50	0	0	–	–	–	–	–	0	0	
Harry Pegg	(Australia)	1945–46	1946–47	2	7	4	2.33	0	0	–	–	–	–	–	1	0	
**Jimmy Peirson**	(Australia)	2016–17	2020–21	36	1630	109	31.96	1	10	–	–	–	–	–	132	1	
Clinton Perren	(Australia)	1998–99	2008–09	82	4737	224	35.35	10	23	2	1/7	75.00	–	–	79	0	
**Lachlan Pfeffer**	(Australia)	2017–18	2019–20	6	214	50	19.45	0	1	–	–	–	–	–	4	0	
Keith Perrins	(Australia)	1960–61	1960–61	4	40	21	10.00	0	0	7	3/42	42.85	–	–	1	0	
Craig Philipson	(Australia)	2003–04	2010–11	29	1136	119	24.17	2	3	3	2/18	30.00	–	–	22	0	
Michael Philipson	(Australia)	2014–15	2014–15	4	89	39	14.83	0	0	11	7/107	18.36	1	–	3	0	
Ray Phillips	(Australia)	1979–80	1985–86	77	2616	111*	29.73	0	0	–	–	–	–	–	246	13	
Michael Pierce	(Australia)	1894–95	1894–95	1	7	7*	7.00	0	0	–	–	–	–	–	2	0	
George Poeppel	(Australia)	1914–15	1914–15	1	16	13	8.00	0	0	–	–	–	–	–	0	0	
Michael Polzin	(Australia)	1986–87	1991–92	15	146	30*	20.85	0	0	56	8/51	26.17	4	1	8	0	
Luke Pomersbach	(Australia)	2012–13	2013–14	9	674	159	37.44	1	4	–	–	–	–	–	15	0	
Hunter Poon	(Australia)	1923–24	1923–24	1	12	10	6.00	0	0	–	–	–	–	–	0	0	
Scott Prestwidge	(Australia)	1991–92	1996–97	3	118	48*	39.33	0	0	7	2/16	46.42	–	–	1	0	
Alec Price	(Australia)	1945–46	1945–46	2	3	2*	1.00	0	0	3	3/80	48.66	–	–	0	0	
Jimmy Prout	(Australia)	1913–14	1919–20	4	118	43	16.85	0	0	–	–	–	–	–	1	0	
Richard Pyke	(Australia)	1903–04	1909–10	2	30	18	15.00	0	0	–	–	–	–	–	3	0	
Carl Rackemann	(Australia)	1979–80	1995–96	114	595	33	7.83	0	0	421	7/43	26.18	14	1	29	0	
Herbert Rahmann	(Australia)	1924–25	1924–25	1	19	19*	–	0	0	–	–	–	–	–	0	0	
Francis Ramsay	(England)	1892–93	1899–1900	3	95	27	15.83	0	0	–	–	–	–	–	3	0	
David Rathie	(Australia)	1970–71	1980–81	7	135	46	10.38	0	0	–	–	–	–	–	1	0	
Mick Raymer	(Australia)	1940–41	1956–57	74	2262	85	22.84	0	14	201	7/100	32.34	6	1	64	0	
Ralph Raymond	(Australia)	1933–34	1933–34	1	19	19	9.50	0	0	–	–	–	–	–	0	0	
Nathan Reardon	(Australia)	2007–08	2015–16	30	1301	147	26.02	1	6	15	3/14	43.53	–	–	14	0	
Sidney Redgrave	(Australia)	1907–08	1921–22	17	557	107	16.38	1	1	32	4/19	37.31	–	–	14	0	
Donald Regeling	(Australia)	1978–79	1978–79	4	111	63	15.85	0	1	–	–	–	–	–	1	0	
Alan Reid	(Australia)	1957–58	1957–58	1	7	7	7.00	0	0	–	–	–	–	–	0	0	
**Matt Renshaw**	(Australia)	2014–15	2020–21	40	2598	170	36.59	7	7	2	1/12	47.00	–	–	36	0	
Raymond Reynolds	(Australia)	1955–56	1963–64	54	3693	203*	46.16	12	14	–	–	–	–	–	9	1	
Viv Richards	(Antigua and Barbuda)	1976–77	1976–77	4	181	73	30.17	0	2	–	–	–	–	–	1	0	
Len Richardson	(Australia)	1976–77	1976–77	6	172	79	17.20	0	1	–	–	–	–	–	4	0	
Nathan Rimmington	(Australia)	2005–06	2017–18	10	125	32	17.86	0	0	11	2/25	64.82	–	–	2	0	
Greg Ritchie	(Australia)	1980–81	1991–92	105	6939	213*	44.77	17	38	3	1/2	68.00	–	–	85	0	
Andrew Robinson	(Australia)	2010–11	2012–13	12	504	78	24.00	0	3	–	–	–	–	–	21	0	
Noel Rogers	(Australia)	1947–48	1947–48	3	50	18	10.00	0	0	–	–	–	–	–	0	0	
Rex Rogers	(Australia)	1935–36	1948–49	56	3600	181	34.95	8	13	1	1/17	157.00	–	–	36	0	
William Rowe	(Australia)	1912–13	1930–31	47	2022	147	25.59	3	10	53	6/15	39.92	1	–	24	0	
Greg Rowell	(Australia)	1989–90	1998–99	37	438	45*	10.95	0	0	118	7/46	32.28	4	1	22	0	
Roy Rushbrook	(Australia)	1936–37	1937–38	2	0	0	0.00	0	0	8	3/109	32.50	–	–	0	0	
Peter Ryan	(Australia)	1971–72	1971–72	3	123	63	20.50	0	0	–	–	–	–	–	0	0	
Leyland Sanders	(Australia)	1950–51	1954–55	10	255	49	15.00	0	0	–	–	–	–	–	9	0	
Keith Savage	(Australia)	1950–51	1950–51	1	4	3*	4.00	0	0	–	–	–	–	–	1	0	
Sidney Schreiber	(Australia)	1898–99	1898–99	1	67	67	33.50	0	1	–	–	–	–	–	2	0	
Denis Schuller	(Australia)	1975–76	1979–80	28	525	48	14.58	0	0	66	6/35	29.72	2	–	14	0	
Richard Searle	(Australia)	1954–55	1954–55	1	0	0	0.00	0	0	4	4/83	32.75	–	–	2	0	
Don Seccombe	(Australia)	1962–63	1964–65	4	212	58	26.50	0	1	–	–	–	–	–	1	0	
Wade Seccombe	(Australia)	1992–93	2004–05	115	3559	151	24.54	4	12	–	–	–	–	–	517	21	
Ian Seib	(Australia)	1969–70	1974–75	33	1303	101	22.08	1	5	–	–	–	–	–	35	0	
William Sewart	(Australia)	1908–09	1918–19	13	435	143	20.71	1	1	–	–	–	–	–	5	0	
James Sheppard	(Australia)	1912–13	1923–24	20	934	101*	25.24	1	4	–	–	–	–	–	17	0	
Leslie Shewan	(Australia)	1924–25	1924–25	1	3	3*	–	0	0	–	–	–	–	–	1	0	
Frank Sides	(Australia)	1930–31	1938–39	26	1308	121	31.14	1	9	–	–	–	–	–	7	1	
Douglas Siggs	(Australia)	1947–48	1947–48	2	19	10*	9.50	0	0	–	–	–	–	–	3	2	
Charles Sim	(Australia)	1925–26	1925–26	4	14	10*	14.00	0	0	11	4/92	24.36	–	–	5	0	
Charles Simpson	(Australia)	1906–07	1908–09	4	317	68*	45.29	0	3	7	4/54	39.14	–	–	2	0	
Chris Simpson	(Australia)	2002–03	2010–11	51	1791	120	21.57	2	10	47	5/68	69.42	1	–	41	0	
Albert Sims	(Australia)	1910–11	1911–12	2	23	11*	7.66	0	0	–	–	–	1	–	3	1	
Alan Skuse	(Australia)	1967–68	1967–68	1	11	11	11.00	0	0	1	1/34	69.00	–	–	1	0	
Chris Smart	(Australia)	1982–83	1989–90	22	964	133	26.77	1	8	–	–	–	–	–	21	0	
Cyril Smith	(Australia)	1947–48	1953–54	27	186	27	6.64	0	0	71	7/58	33.91	–	–	17	0	
Hubert Smith	(Australia)	1911–12	1912–13	3	29	15	4.83	0	0	7	3/50	26.57	–	–	0	0	
Thomas Smith	(Australia)	1921–22	1923–24	3	61	21	10.16	0	0	–	–	–	–	–	0	0	
Richard Spry	(Australia)	1892–93	1892–93	1	0	0	0.00	0	0	–	–	–	–	–	0	0	
Jack Stackpoole	(Australia)	1939–40	1940–41	3	6	5*	2.00	0	0	14	6/72	25.64	1	–	4	0	
**Billy Stanlake**	(Australia)	2015–16	2019–20	8	9	4*	1.50	0	0	21	3/50	31.23	–	–	2	0	
**Mark Steketee**	(Australia)	2014–15	2020–21	38	674	53	16.43	0	2	127	5/19	26.70	1	–	14	0	
Lachlan Stevens	(Australia)	2004–05	2006–07	14	631	105	25.24	1	4	2	1/4	65.50	–	–	11	0	
Nick Stevens	(Australia)	2013–14	2014–15	6	264	158	29.33	1	0	–	–	–	–	–	1	0	
Trevor Stewart	(Australia)	1960–61	1963–64	6	120	36	20.00	0	0	13	3/78	44.92	–	–	3	0	
Colin Stibe	(Australia)	1938–39	1939–40	3	87	58	17.40	0	1	–	–	–	–	–	1	0	
Steve Storey	(Australia)	1989–90	1993–94	20	619	103	22.10	1	2	31	5/55	48.32	1	–	8	0	
**Bryce Street**	(Australia)	2019–20	2020–21	11	635	115	35.27	2	3	–	–	–	–	–	13	0	
Bruce Such	(Australia)	1931–32	1932–33	2	39	15	13.00	0	0	1	1/133	183.00	–	–	1	0	
Grant Sullivan	(Australia)	2006–07	2009–10	10	68	22	11.33	0	0	16	3/18	65.68	–	–	6	0	
William Sullivan	(Australia)	1908–09	1908–09	1	2	2*	2.00	0	0	–	–	–	–	–	0	0	
Rusi Surti	(India)	1968–69	1972–73	31	1759	100	29.32	1	13	48	5/78	33.21	2	–	22	0	
Chris Swan	(Australia)	2006–07	2011–12	31	804	82	21.15	0	3	101	7/75	25.92	3	1	11	0	
Robert Swendsen	(Australia)	1948–49	1948–49	2	19	11	9.50	0	0	4	3/25	31.50	–	–	2	0	
**Mitchell Swepson**	(Australia)	2015–16	2020–21	39	588	37	13.67	0	0	120	5/55	34.18	4	1	29	0	
Andrew Symonds	(Australia)	1993–94	2008–09	102	5725	163	36.47	14	23	123	4/39	33.39	0	0	58	0	
Alan Tait	(Australia)	1933–34	1935–36	5	126	61	18.00	0	1	6	2/38	66.50	–	–	3	0	
Don Tallon	(Australia)	1933–34	1953–54	79	3851	154	29.17	5	18	–	–	–	–	–	166	79	
Bill Tallon	(Australia)	1938–39	1939–40	9	183	40*	16.63	0	0	21	5/77	41.85	1	–	5	0	
Peter Taylor	(Australia)	1990–91	1991–92	11	211	69	14.07	0	1	11	3/45	77.73	–	–	7	0	
Bruce Taylor	(Australia)	1949–50	1949–50	1	11	11	5.50	0	0	–	–	–	–	–	1	0	
Dirk Tazelaar	(Australia)	1985–86	1995–96	79	893	56	14.17	0	1	277	6/48	27.75	9	1	38	0	
Jeff Thomas	(Australia)	1993–94	1993–94	3	158	38	26.33	0	0	–	–	–	–	–	2	0	
Cecil Thompson	(Australia)	1912–13	1933–34	58	4132	275*	42.16	11	17	31	4/21	41.87	–	–	15	0	
William Thompson	(Australia)	1914–15	1914–15	1	1	1	0.50	0	0	–	–	–	–	–	0	0	
Harold Thomsett	(Australia)	1935–36	1935–36	2	69	25	23.00	0	0	1	1/26	43.00	–	–	0	0	
Joseph Thomson	(Australia)	1905–06	1920–21	22	1043	116	26.07	1	4	7	3/35	67.71	–	–	7	0	
Jeff Thomson	(Australia)	1974–75	1985–86	85	947	61	14.35	0	1	343	7/27	24.97	17	3	24	0	
Linsley Thorpe	(Australia)	1957–58	1958–59	8	52	25	8.66	0	0	–	–	–	–	–	16	4	
Pud Thurlow	(Australia)	1928–29	1934–35	30	202	23	5.46	0	0	80	6/59	41.81	5	–	10	0	
Thomas Thwaites	(Australia)	1940–41	1940–41	1	24	24*	24.00	0	0	–	–	–	–	–	0	0	
Fredrick Timbury	(Australia)	1904–05	1907–08	6	59	10	7.37	0	0	14	4/46	38.42	–	–	1	0	
Mark Tooley	(Australia)	1989–90	1989–90	1	48	31	48.00	0	0	–	–	–	–	–	0	0	
Ern Toovey	(Australia)	1949–50	1955–56	37	1346	87	24.03	0	9	–	–	–	–	–	5	0	
Richard Tovey	(Australia)	1957–58	1963–64	13	238	62	14.00	0	1	–	–	–	–	–	35	7	
Wade Townsend	(Australia)	2009–10	2012–13	38	1908	166*	30.28	5	8	–	–	–	–	–	21	0	
Roger Traves	(Australia)	1981–82	1981–82	5	177	29	17.70	0	0	–	–	–	–	–	3	0	
Peter Trethewey	(Australia)	1962–63	1962–63	1	2	2	2.00	0	0	4	4/65	18.75	–	–	0	0	
Glenn Trimble	(Australia)	1982–83	1989–90	57	2881	138*	33.11	4	16	–	–	–	–	–	55	0	
Sam Trimble	(Australia)	1959–60	1975–76	144	10282	252*	41.79	26	48	3	2/15	59.00	–	–	86	0	
Sam Truloff	(Australia)	2016–17	2018–19	10	278	45	17.37	0	0	–	–	–	–	–	8	0	
Paul Twible	(Australia)	1982–83	1985–86	5	72	39	24.00	0	0	5	3/82	70.00	–	–	1	0	
**Usman Khawaja**	(Australia)	2012–13	2020–21	34	2341	182*	44.16	6	12	–	–	–	–	–	20	0	
Tom Veivers	(Australia)	1958–59	1967–68	55	3088	137	38.60	3	21	104	5/63	36.39	2	–	29	0	
Jeff Walker	(Australia)	1988–89	1988–89	2	87	41	21.75	0	0	–	–	–	–	–	0	0	
Wal Walmsley	(Australia)	1954–55	1958–59	28	577	106*	21.37	1	2	102	6/56	30.13	3	–	4	0	
Scott Walter	(Australia)	2008–09	2011–12	11	78	15*	13.00	0	0	34	6/121	30.73	2	–	5	0	
Maxwell Walters	(Australia)	1975–76	1978–79	13	544	122	22.66	1	1	–	–	–	–	–	4	0	
Lester Warden	(Australia)	1961–62	1962–63	2	31	13	10.33	0	0	–	–	–	–	–	1	0	
Gerald Warr	(Australia)	1960–61	1960–61	2	16	8	8.00	0	0	2	1/0	100.50	–	–	5	0	
Leonard Waterman	(Australia)	1931–32	1932–33	5	87	20	9.66	0	0	–	–	–	–	–	7	5	
Shane Watson	(Australia)	2004–05	2008–09	25	1678	201*	43.04	4	6	45	7/69	27.82	1	–	25	0	
Donald Watt	(Australia)	1939–40	1945–46	13	524	59*	23.81	0	4	17	4/40	49.29	–	–	6	0	
Berry Webb	(Australia)	1937–38	1937–38	1	59	59	59.00	0	1	–	–	–	–	–	0	0	
Stan Weir	(Australia)	1929–30	1929–30	1	3	3	3.00	0	0	–	–	–	–	–	0	0	
Dirk Wellham	(Australia)	1991–92	1993–94	23	1434	167	39.83	3	8	–	–	–	–	–	15	0	
Kepler Wessels	(South Africa)	1979–80	1985–86	62	5419	249	52.11	18	21	7	2/25	31.57	–	–	40	0	
Col Westaway	(Australia)	1957–58	1963–64	19	207	33	13.80	0	0	52	6/88	32.75	–	–	2	0	
John Whalley	(Australia)	1904–05	1904–05	1	16	16	8.00	0	0	–	–	–	–	–	0	0	
Graham Whyte	(Australia)	1974–75	1984–85	44	1033	93	18.12	0	5	73	6/65	38.87	1	–	31	0	
**Jack Wildermuth**	(Australia)	2014–15	2020–21	45	2008	110	28.28	2	10	103	5/40	29.36	1	–	12	0	
Robert Willcocks	(Australia)	1913–14	1913–14	1	0	0	0.00	0	0	1	1/58	76.00	–	–	0	0	
Scott Williams	(Australia)	1991–92	1991–92	4	79	29	19.75	0	0	10	2/37	45.10	–	–	1	0	
Richard Wilson	(Australia)	1896–97	1896–97	6	72	15	9.00	0	0	22	8/35	18.31	1	1	7	0	
Ezra Wyeth	(Australia)	1933–34	1937–38	25	251	29	8.09	0	0	50	6/33	43.18	2	–	8	0	
Fergus Yeates	(Australia)	1933–34	1933–34	3	46	16	11.50	0	0	6	3/47	60.16	–	–	1	0	
Allan Young	(Australia)	1945–46	1949–50	23	553	67	20.48	0	3	26	4/68	54.92	–	–	12	0	
Keith Ziebell	(Australia)	1965–66	1966–67	9	506	212*	36.14	1	2	2	1/15	59.50	–	–	13	0	

== Appendix ==
=== List A/T20 players ===
The following cricketers have played in List A and/or Twenty20 matches for Queensland, but have not appeared in first-class cricket for the team:

- Corey Barsby (2010–11) : C. R. Barsby
- Phillip Bawden (1973–74) : P. A. Bawden
- Michael Buchanan (2005–06 to 2007–08) : M. J. Buchanan
- Daniel Coleborn (1991–92) : D. P. Coleborn
- Andrew Gode (2018–19) : A. J. Gode
- Errol Harris (1991–92) : E. J. Harris
- Graeme Hogan (1991–92) : G. G. Hogan
- Brad Ipson (2010–11 to 2012–13) : B. K. Ipson
- Michael Lumb (2010–11) : M. J. Lumb
- Rodney Peterson (1991–92) : R. M. Peterson
- Trent Ryan (1991–92) : T. A. Ryan
- Joe Scuderi (1988–89) : J. C. Scuderi
- Michael Sippel (2001–02) : M. Sippel
- Graeme Skennar (2011–12) : G. I. Skennar
- Brad Spanner (1991–92) : B. J. Spanner
- Derek Tate (2005–06) : D. J. Tate
- Dale Turner (1999–2000 to 2000–01) : D. A. Turner
- Daniel Vettori (2009–10) : D. L. Vettori

== See also ==
- List of international cricketers from Queensland
