= Hector Mahoney =

Australian cricketer

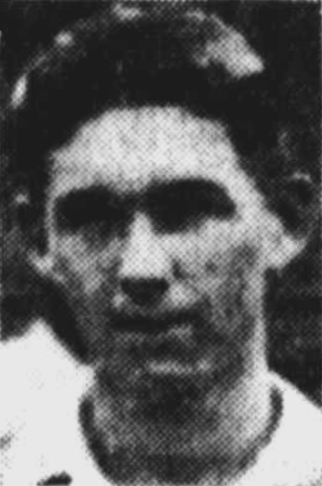

Personal information
- Born: 8 September 1913; Maryborough, Queensland, Australia
- Died: 25 September 1991 (aged 78); Maryborough, Queensland, Australia
- Source: Cricinfo, 5 October 2020

Hector Mahoney (8 September 1913 – 25 September 1991) was an Australian cricketer. He played in three first-class matches for Queensland in 1937/38.

== See also ==
- List of Queensland first-class cricketers
