= Bruce Suche =

Australian cricketer

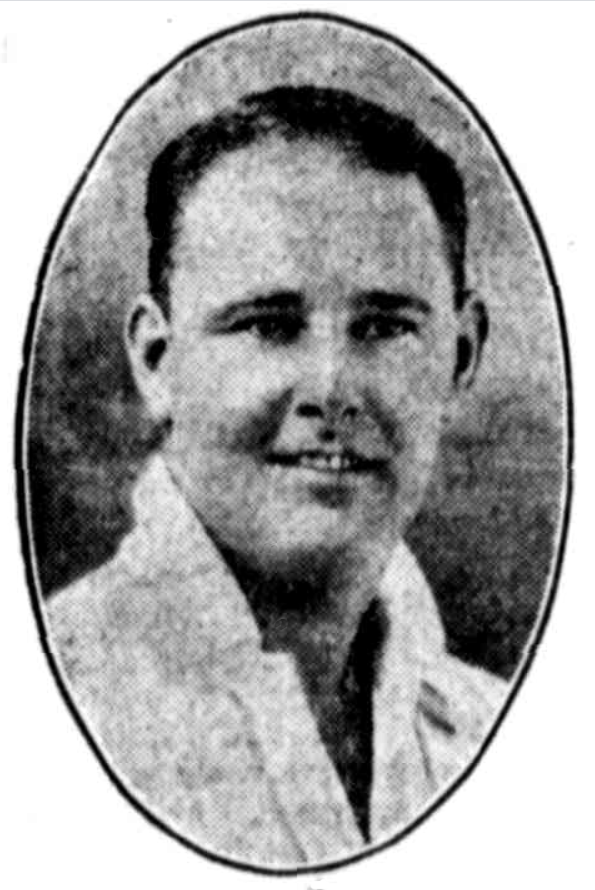

Personal information
- Born: 1907; Sydney, Australia
- Died: 14 April 1933 (aged 25–26); Townsville, Queensland, Australia
- Source: Cricinfo, 6 October 2020

Bruce Vincent Suche (1907 – 14 April 1933) was an Australian cricketer. He played in two first-class matches for Queensland between 1931 and 1933. He also played for Townsville. He killed himself by taking cyanide in 1933.

== See also ==
- List of Queensland first-class cricketers
