= Desmond Hughson =

Australian cricketer (born 1941)

Personal information
- Born: 27 May 1941 (age 85); Brisbane, Queensland, Australia
- Source: Cricinfo, 3 October 2020

Desmond Hughson (born 27 May 1941) is an Australian cricketer. He played in fourteen first-class matches for Queensland between 1959 and 1969.

== See also ==
- List of Queensland first-class cricketers
