= Scott O'Leary =

Australian cricketer (born 1977)

Personal information
- Born: 17 December 1977 (age 48); Brisbane, Queensland, Australia
- Source: Cricinfo, 6 October 2020

Scott O'Leary (born 17 December 1977) is an Australian cricketer. He played in seven first-class and three List A matches for Queensland in 2000/01.

== See also ==
- List of Queensland first-class cricketers
