= John Lewis (cricketer) =

Australian cricketer

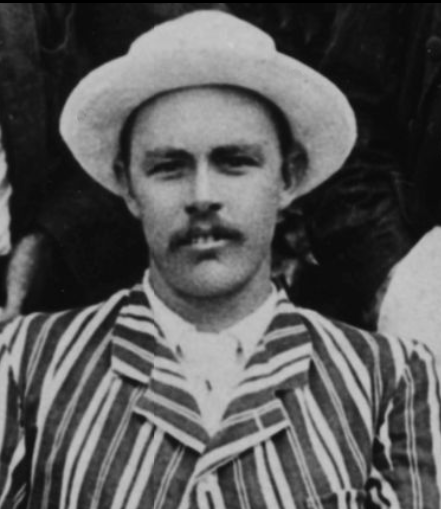

Personal information
- Born: 21 November 1867; Brisbane, Queensland, Australia
- Died: 19 September 1939 (aged 71); Brisbane, Queensland, Australia
- Source: Cricinfo, 5 October 2020

John Lewis (21 November 1867 – 19 September 1939) was an Australian cricketer. He played in eighteen first-class matches for Queensland between 1894 and 1912.

== See also ==
- List of Queensland first-class cricketers
