= Ralph Raymond =

Australian cricketer

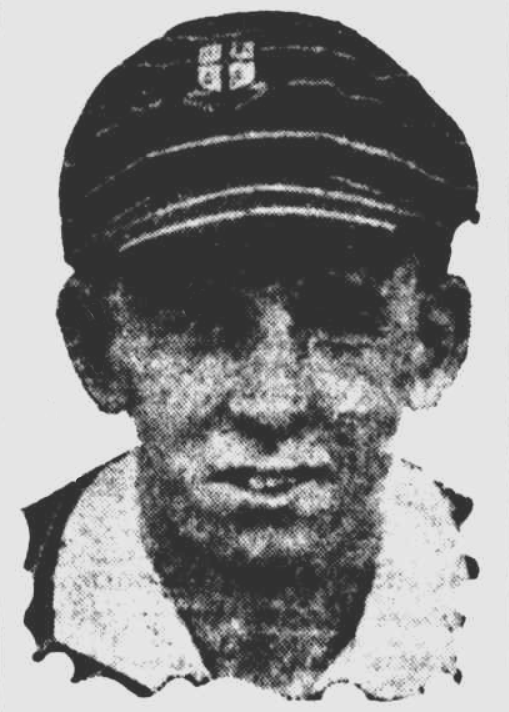

Personal information
- Born: 28 November 1912; Boonah, Queensland, Australia
- Died: 11 October 1982 (aged 69); Murgon, Queensland, Australia
- Source: Cricinfo, 6 October 2020

Ralph Raymond (28 November 1912 – 11 October 1982) was an Australian cricketer. He played in one first-class match for Queensland in 1933/34.

== See also ==
- List of Queensland first-class cricketers
