= Colin Stibe =

Australian cricketer

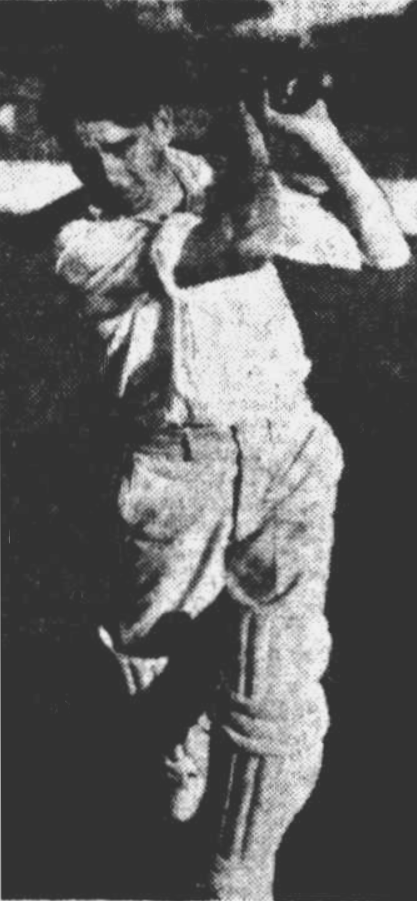

Personal information
- Born: 22 April 1916; Bundaberg, Queensland, Australia
- Died: 6 January 1970 (aged 53); Sydney, Australia
- Source: Cricinfo, 6 October 2020

Colin Stibe (22 April 1916 – 6 January 1970) was an Australian cricketer. He played in three first-class matches for Queensland between 1938 and 1940. He also played for Bundaberg.

== See also ==
- List of Queensland first-class cricketers
