= Richard Wilson (cricketer) =

Australian cricketer

Personal information
- Born: 14 January 1869; Sydney, Australia
- Source: Cricinfo, 8 October 2020

Richard Wilson (born 14 January 1869, date of death unknown) was an Australian cricketer. He played in six first-class matches for Queensland in 1896–97.

== See also ==
- List of Queensland first-class cricketers
