= Michael Polzin =

Australian cricketer (born 1964)

Personal information
- Born: 23 June 1964 (age 62); Wondai, Queensland, Australia
- Source: Cricinfo, 6 October 2020

Michael Polzin (born 23 June 1964) is an Australian cricketer. He played in fifteen first-class and fourteen List A matches for Queensland between 1986 and 1992.

== See also ==
- List of Queensland first-class cricketers
