= David Hale (Australian cricketer) =

Australian cricketer (born 1941)

Personal information
- Born: 11 November 1941 (age 85); Brisbane, Queensland, Australia
- Source: Cricinfo, 3 October 2020

David Hale (born 11 November 1941) is an Australian cricketer. He played in eight first-class matches for Queensland between 1963 and 1966.

== See also ==
- List of Queensland first-class cricketers
