= Michael Mainhardt =

Australian cricketer (born 1960)

Personal information
- Full name: Michael Shane Mainhardt
- Born: 6 January 1960 (age 66); Clermont, Queensland, Australia
- Batting: Right-handed
- Bowling: Right-arm fast medium
- Role: Bowler

Domestic team information
- Years: Team
- 1980/81–1986/87: Queensland

Career statistics
Competition	First-class	List A
Matches	3	3
Runs scored	6	-
Batting average	6.00	-
100s/50s	-/-	-/-
Top score	5	-
Balls bowled	444	162
Wickets	3	3
Bowling average	86.00	44.33
5 wickets in innings	-	-
10 wickets in match	-	N/A
Best bowling	1/20	2/45
Catches/stumpings	1/-	1/-
- Source: Cricinfo, 5 August 2021

Michael Mainhardt (born 6 January 1960) is an Australian cricketer. He played in three first-class and three List A matches for Queensland between 1980 and 1987.

== See also ==
- List of Queensland first-class cricketers
