= Roger Traves =

Australian cricketer (born 1961)

Personal information
- Born: 15 October 1961 (age 65); Cairns, Queensland, Australia
- Source: Cricinfo, 8 October 2020

Roger Traves (born 15 October 1961) is an Australian cricketer. He played in five first-class matches for Queensland in 1981/82.

== See also ==
- List of Queensland first-class cricketers
