= Harold Noyes =

Australian cricketer

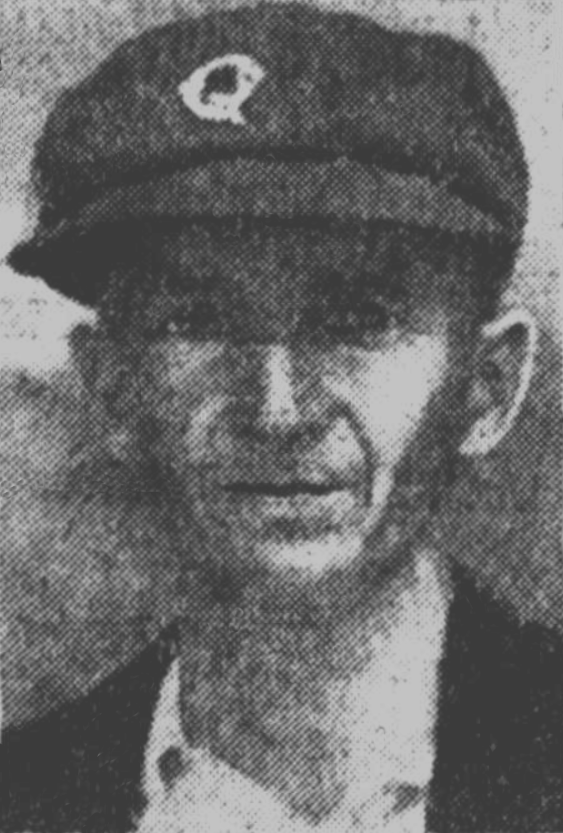

Personal information
- Full name: Harold David Noyes
- Born: 12 August 1892; Warwick, Queensland, Australia
- Died: 14 July 1968 (aged 75); Brisbane, Queensland, Australia
- Source: Cricinfo, 6 October 2020

Harold Noyes (12 August 1892 – 14 July 1968) was an Australian cricketer. He played in six first-class matches for Queensland between 1924 and 1927.

== See also ==
- List of Queensland first-class cricketers
