= William Thompson (Australian cricketer) =

Australian cricketer

Personal information
- Born: 2 January 1891; Queensland, Australia
- Source: Cricinfo, 8 October 2020

William Thompson (born 2 January 1891 - 1969) was an Australian cricketer. He played in one first-class match for Queensland in 1914/15.

== See also ==
- List of Queensland first-class cricketers
