= Norman Grant (cricketer) =

Australian cricketer

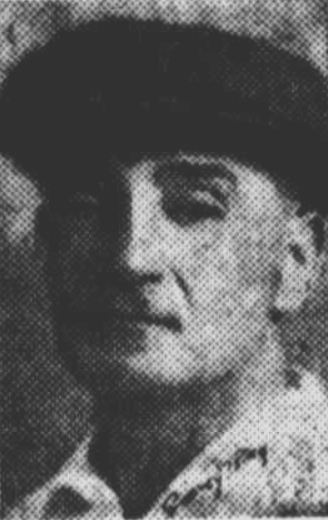

Personal information
- Born: 15 January 1891; Sydney, Australia
- Died: 17 September 1966 (aged 75); Coorparoo, Queensland, Australia
- Source: Cricinfo, 3 October 2020

Norman Grant (15 January 1891 – 17 September 1966) was an Australian cricketer. He played in one first-class match for Queensland in 1926/27.

== See also ==
- List of Queensland first-class cricketers
