= Michael Sippel =

Australian cricketer (born 1975)

Personal information
- Born: 1 November 1975 (age 51); Ipswich, Queensland, Australia
- Source: Cricinfo, 9 October 2020

Michael Sippel (born 1 November 1975) is an Australian cricketer. He played in two List A matches for Queensland in 2001/02.

== See also ==
- List of Queensland first-class cricketers
