= Roy Rushbrook =

Australian cricketer

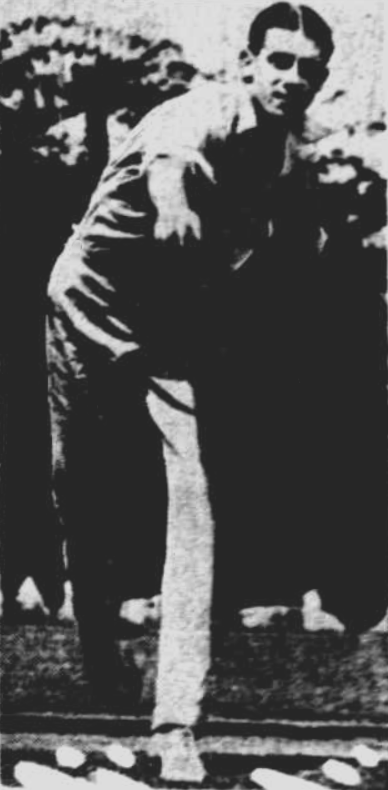

Personal information
- Born: 29 September 1911; Brisbane, Queensland, Australia
- Died: 31 March 1987 (aged 75); Mackay, Queensland, Australia
- Source: Cricinfo, 6 October 2020

Roy Rushbrook (29 September 1911 – 31 March 1987) was an Australian cricketer. He played in two first-class matches for Queensland between 1936 and 1938.

== See also ==
- List of Queensland first-class cricketers
