= Neville Fraser (Queensland cricketer) =

Australian cricketer

Personal information
- Born: 28 September 1930; Cleveland, Queensland, Australia
- Died: 17 May 2010 (aged 79); Tweed Heads South, New South Wales, Australia
- Source: Cricinfo, 3 October 2020

Neville Fraser (28 September 1930 – 17 May 2010) was an Australian cricketer. He played in two first-class matches for Queensland in 1950/51.

== See also ==
- List of Queensland first-class cricketers
