= Keith Perrins =

Australian cricketer (1931–2023)

Personal information
- Full name: Keith Robinson Perrins
- Born: 17 January 1931; Rockhampton, Queensland, Australia
- Died: 23 June 2023 (aged 92); Brisbane, Queensland, Australia
- Source: Cricinfo, 6 October 2020

Keith Robinson Perrins (17 January 1931 – 23 June 2023) was an Australian cricketer. He played in four first-class matches for Queensland in 1960/61. Perrins died in Brisbane, Queensland on 23 June 2023, at the age of 92.

== See also ==
- List of Queensland first-class cricketers
