= Jim Bratchford =

Australian cricketer

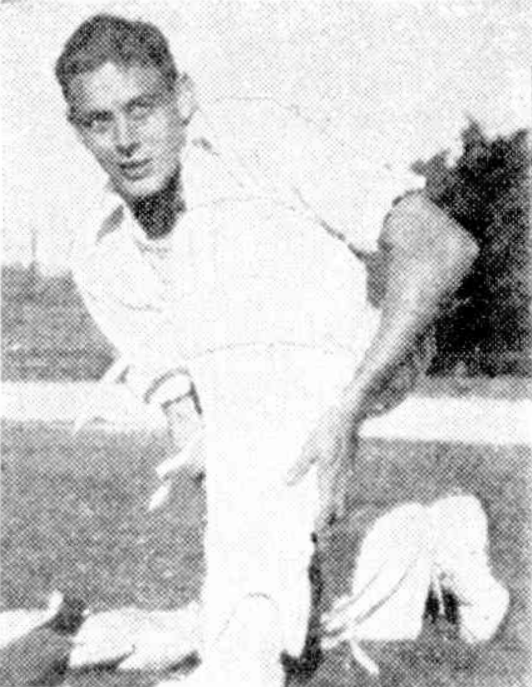

Personal information
- Born: 2 February 1929; Cleveland, Queensland, Australia
- Died: 5 October 1997 (aged 68)
- Source: Cricinfo, 1 October 2020

Jim Bratchford (2 February 1929 – 5 October 1997) was an Australian cricketer. He played in 55 first-class matches for Queensland between 1952 and 1960. He died during a flight from the United States to Australia.

== See also ==
- List of Queensland first-class cricketers
