= Moffitt Austin =

Australian cricketer

Personal information
- Born: 23 October 1873; Sydney, Australia
- Died: 21 February 1942 (aged 68); Lidcombe, New South Wales, Australia
- Source: Cricinfo, 1 October 2020

Moffitt Austin (23 October 1873 – 21 February 1942) was an Australian cricketer. He played in two first-class matches for Queensland in 1894/95.

== See also ==
- List of Queensland first-class cricketers
