= William Munro (cricketer) =

Australian cricketer (1862–1896)

William Munro (1862 – 18 February 1896) was an English-born Australian cricketer. He played one first-class match for Queensland in 1893.

Munro played his first notable cricket match in 1884 when he was selected to represent Queensland against New South Wales in an Intercolonial match and the match report described him as a junior who could bat and bowl 'breaks'. He went on to play for the Stanley Cricket Club in Brisbane senior cricket for several years and Queensland in other Intercolonial matches remaining a prominent figure in Queensland cricket until shortly before his passing. In April 1893 he was selected to represent Queensland in the state's inaugural first-class game against New South Wales in Brisbane.

In his professional life, Munro worked for the Surveyor-General's Department from 1879 and became the officer in charge of its compiling branch. In his personal life, he became conductor at St. Mary's Church. He died after a period of illness in early 1896 at the age of just thirty-four.

== See also ==
- List of Queensland first-class cricketers
