= Scott Ledger =

Australian cricketer (born 1952)

Personal information
- Born: 1 September 1952 (age 74); Nambour, Queensland, Australia
- Source: Cricinfo, 5 October 2020

Scott Ledger (born 1 September 1952) is an Australian cricketer. He played in two first-class matches for Queensland in 1972/73.

== See also ==
- List of Queensland first-class cricketers
