= James Harten =

Australian cricketer

Personal information
- Born: 11 November 1924; Brisbane, Queensland, Australia
- Died: 11 September 2001 (aged 76); Brisbane, Queensland, Australia
- Source: Cricinfo, 3 October 2020

James Harten (11 November 1924 – 11 September 2001) was an Australian cricketer. He played in two first-class match for Queensland in 1949/50.

== See also ==
- List of Queensland first-class cricketers
