= Mark Tooley (cricketer) =

Australian cricketer (born 1956)

Personal information
- Born: 29 April 1956 (age 70); Toowoomba, Queensland, Australia
- Source: Cricinfo, 8 October 2020

Mark Tooley (born 29 April 1956) is an Australian cricketer. He played in one first-class and two List A matches for Queensland between 1989 and 1993.

== See also ==
- List of Queensland first-class cricketers
