= Trent Ryan =

Australian cricketer (born 1968)

Personal information
- Born: 18 June 1968 (age 58); Redcliffe, Queensland, Australia
- Source: Cricinfo, 9 October 2020

Trent Ryan (born 18 June 1968) is an Australian cricketer. He played in two List A matches for Queensland in 1991/92.

== See also ==
- List of Queensland first-class cricketers
