= Sydney Ayres (cricketer) =

Australian cricketer

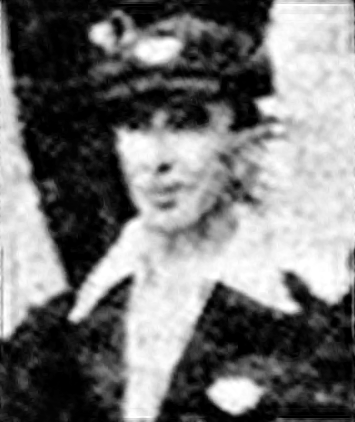

Personal information
- Born: 7 August 1889; Enmore, New South Wales, Australia
- Died: 7 August 1974 (aged 85); Castle Hill, New South Wales, Australia
- Source: Cricinfo, 1 October 2020

Sydney Ayres (7 August 1889 – 7 August 1974) was an Australian cricketer. He played in fourteen first-class matches for Queensland between 1913 and 1925.

== See also ==
- List of Queensland first-class cricketers
