= Ernest Grew =

Australian cricketer

Personal information
- Full name: Ernest Sadler Grew
- Born: 11 August 1867; Birmingham, Warwickshire, England
- Died: 4 September 1954 (aged 87); Brisbane, Queensland, Australia
- Source: Cricinfo, 14 June 2020

Ernest Sadler Grew (11 August 1867 – 4 September 1954) was an Australian cricketer. He played in the inaugural first-class match for Queensland in 1893. In his professional career he was a public accountant.

== Personal life ==
Grew immigrated to Australia from England arriving on the steamer Dacca in 1890. The steamer wrecked and Grew received just four pounds in compensation, and complained that government funded immigrants on the steamer received greater compensation than those like himself who had paid for their own passage. In 1895 he married Jessie Stephens Davidson of Mount Cootha in Brisbane, and they remained married until she died in 1916.

In 1898 he passed an exam and was admitted to the Queensland Institute of Accountants. In 1905 he was appointed as an auditor of the South Brisbane city accounts.

In 1946 he was elected as auditor of the Southern Queensland Dairy Co. Ltd, and he was still serving in the role as of 1952.

== Cricket career ==
As of 1891 Grew was playing as a bowler for the First Southern Stars cricket club which was an Ipswich team. In March 1892 he was the only Ipswich cricketer to be selected for a match between two Queensland sides played in Brisbane, and in December he played in a non first-class match played between Queensland and New South Wales. In April 1893 he played for Queensland in their inaugural first-class match against New South Wales.

In the 1893-94 season Grew played for the Brisbane based Alberts cricket club and in 1895 he moved to play for the Hall-Gibbs cricket team. In February 1897 he was selected to practice ahead of a first-class match between Queensland and New South Wales but was not selected in the Queensland side.

In 1897 when Brisbane electoral cricket was established Grew began playing for Toowong in what appears to have been his last year playing district cricket, although in 1903 he did play in a match between employees of two mercantile firms.

== See also ==
- List of Queensland first-class cricketers
