= Rodney Lyons (cricketer) =

Australian cricketer

Personal information
- Born: 24 April 1924; Cairns, Queensland, Australia
- Died: 19 July 2013 (aged 89); Brisbane, Queensland, Australia
- Source: Cricinfo, 5 October 2020

Rodney Lyons (24 April 1924 – 19 July 2013) was an Australian cricketer. He played in nineteen first-class matches for Queensland between 1955 and 1959.

== See also ==
- List of Queensland first-class cricketers
