= Robert Mihell =

Australian cricketer

Personal information
- Born: 8 January 1937 (age 89); Lismore, New South Wales, Australia
- Source: Cricinfo, 5 October 2020

Robert Mihell (born 8 January 1937) is an Australian cricketer. He played in twelve first-class matches for Queensland between 1957 and 1961.

== See also ==
- List of Queensland first-class cricketers
