= Frank Nolan (cricketer) =

Australian cricketer

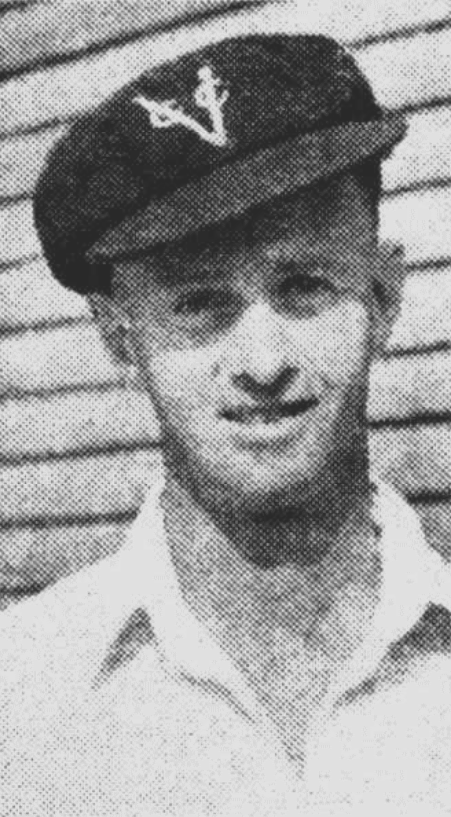

Personal information
- Born: 27 June 1920; Brisbane, Queensland, Australia
- Died: 12 October 2009 (aged 89); Brisbane, Queensland, Australia
- Source: Cricinfo, 6 October 2020

Frank Nolan (27 June 1920 – 12 October 2009) was an Australian cricketer. He played in three first-class matches for Queensland between 1948 and 1950.

== See also ==
- List of Queensland first-class cricketers
