= Joseph Thomson (cricketer) =

Australian cricketer

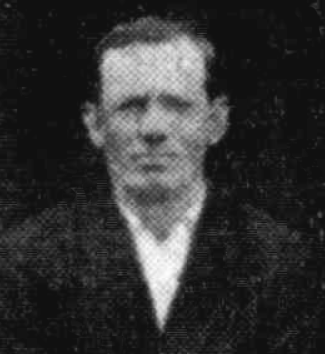

Personal information
- Born: 27 May 1877; Brisbane, Queensland, Australia
- Died: 1 August 1953 (aged 76); Brisbane, Queensland, Australia
- Source: Cricinfo, 8 October 2020

Joseph Thomson (27 May 1877 – 1 August 1953) was an Australian cricketer. He played in twenty-two first-class matches for Queensland between 1905 and 1921.

== See also ==
- List of Queensland first-class cricketers
