= Warwick Neville =

Australian cricketer (born 1948)

Personal information
- Born: 31 December 1948 (age 77); Melbourne, Australia
- Source: Cricinfo, 6 October 2020

Warwick Neville (born 31 December 1948) is an Australian cricketer. He played in two first-class matches for Queensland in 1971/72.

== See also ==
- List of Queensland first-class cricketers
