= Norman Foster (cricketer) =

Australian cricketer

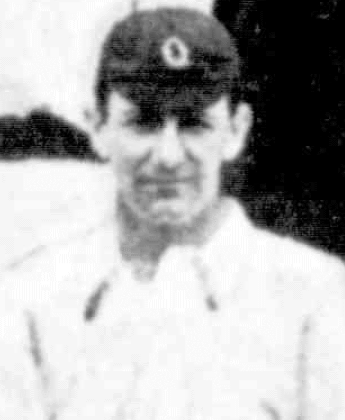

Personal information
- Born: 19 January 1878; Brisbane, Queensland, Australia
- Died: 15 March 1960 (aged 82); Clayfield, Queensland, Australia
- Source: Cricinfo, 3 October 2020

Norman Foster (19 January 1878 – 15 March 1960) was an Australian cricketer. He played in nine first-class matches for Queensland between 1898 and 1906.

== See also ==
- List of Queensland first-class cricketers
