= Frederick Fett =

Australian cricketer

Personal information
- Born: 2 May 1886; Toowoomba, Queensland, Australia
- Died: 27 August 1979 (aged 93); Buranda, Queensland, Australia
- Source: Cricinfo, 3 October 2020

Frederick Fett (2 May 1886 – 27 August 1979) was an Australian cricketer. He played in two first-class matches for Queensland between 1909 and 1912.

== See also ==
- List of Queensland first-class cricketers
