= Sidney Schreiber (cricketer) =

Australian cricketer

Personal information
- Born: 7 April 1873
- Died: 23 September 1957 (aged 84)
- Source: Cricinfo, 6 October 2020

Sidney Schreiber (7 April 1873 – 23 September 1957) was an Australian cricketer. He played in one first-class match for Queensland in 1898/99.

== See also ==
- List of Queensland first-class cricketers
