= Stephen Monty =

Australian cricketer (born 1963)

Personal information
- Born: 30 March 1963 (age 63); Adelaide, Australia
- Source: Cricinfo, 5 October 2020

Stephen Monty (born 30 March 1963) is an Australian cricketer. He played in eleven first-class and four List A matches for Queensland between 1990 and 1992.

== See also ==
- List of Queensland first-class cricketers
