= Ernest Benbow =

Australian cricketer

Personal information
- Born: 14 March 1888; Mount Walker, Queensland, Australia
- Died: 28 December 1940 (aged 52); Springsure, Queensland, Australia
- Source: Cricinfo, 1 October 2020

Ernest Benbow (14 March 1888 – 28 December 1940) was an Australian cricketer. He played in two first-class matches for Queensland in 1909/1910.

== See also ==
- List of Queensland first-class cricketers
