= Malcolm Campbell (cricketer) =

Australian cricketer

Personal information
- Born: 9 January 1881; Ipswich, Queensland, Australia
- Died: 14 December 1967 (aged 86); Ipswich, Queensland, Australia
- Source: Cricinfo, 1 October 2020

Malcolm Campbell (9 January 1881 – 14 December 1967) was an Australian cricketer. He played in one first-class match for Queensland in 1899/1900.

== See also ==
- List of Queensland first-class cricketers
