= Charles Maddock =

Australian cricketer

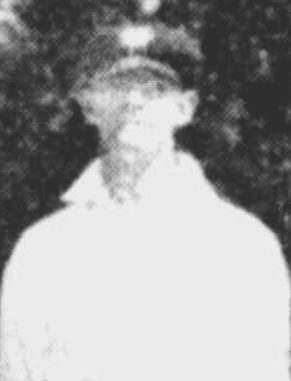

Personal information
- Born: 14 August 1887; Queensland, Australia
- Died: 14 February 1957 (aged 69); Herston, Queensland, Australia
- Batting: Right-handed
- Bowling: Legbreak

Domestic team information
- Years: Team
- 1919/20: Queensland
- Source: Cricinfo, 5 October 2020

Charles Maddock (14 August 1887 – 14 February 1957) was an Australian cricketer. He played in two first-class matches for Queensland in 1919–20.

== Cricket career ==
Maddock was raised in Warwick, Queensland and began his cricket career there but later moved to Goodna where he became well-known as a cricketer. In March 1919, the Queensland Cricket Association organized a special match between former First-class players and a Colts team of promising young cricketers and Maddock was selected in the Colts side. He was noted as being the hardest hitting batsman in Queensland and it was also noted he had been very successful with the ball recently.

Maddock was selected in the Queensland first-class side in the 1919–20 season playing two First-class games in which he struggled, taking just one wicket at an average of 145 and scoring 17 runs at an average of 8.5.

His state career was cut short as he came under suspicion of stealing money and items from the dressing room during matches, and a trap was set for him in early 1920 when Queensland played the A.I.F. side with marked bank notes being placed in the dressing room. He admitted to stealing when caught, and claimed that while he had a good position working at the Goodna Hospital, he had a wife and four children and was in poverty.

He was sentenced on three charges of theft to imprisonment for one month, and one month and fourteen days of hard labour.

== See also ==
- List of Queensland first-class cricketers
