= George Crouch (cricketer) =

Australian cricketer

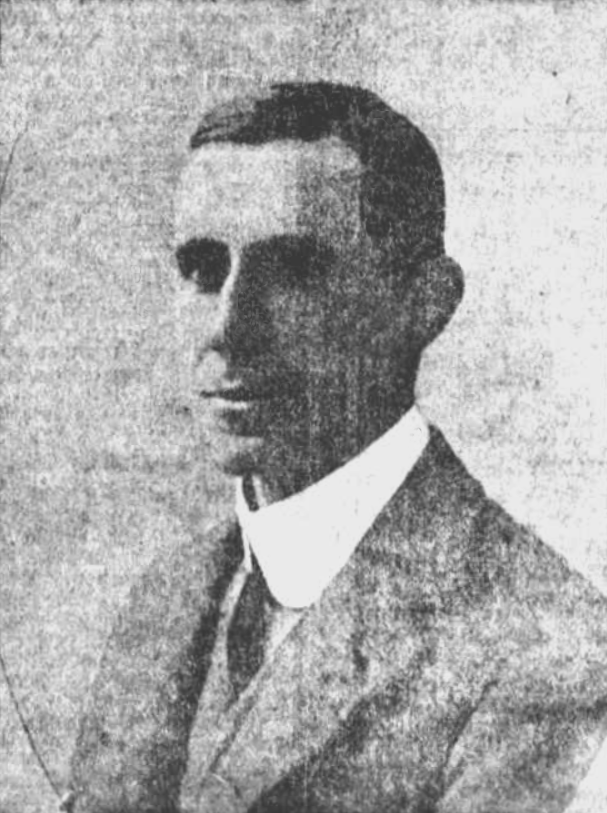

Personal information
- Born: 20 August 1878; London, England
- Died: 21 August 1952 (aged 74); Indooroopilly, Queensland, Australia
- Source: Cricinfo, 1 October 2020

George Crouch (20 August 1878 – 21 August 1952) was an Australian cricketer. He played in five first-class matches for Queensland between 1903 and 1906.

== See also ==
- List of Queensland first-class cricketers
