= Rupert Law =

Australian cricketer

Personal information
- Born: 24 February 1890; Sydney, Australia
- Died: 5 May 1942 (aged 52); Sydney, Australia
- Source: Cricinfo, 5 October 2020

Rupert Law (24 February 1890 – 5 May 1942) was an Australian cricketer. He played in two first-class matches for Queensland in 1912/13.

== See also ==
- List of Queensland first-class cricketers
