= Urban Heffernan =

Australian cricketer

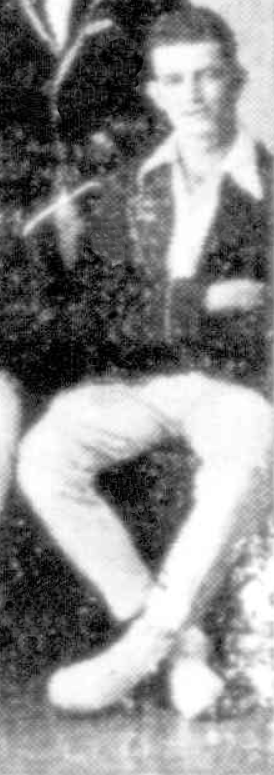

Personal information
- Born: 25 May 1901; Bowen, Queensland, Australia
- Died: 21 September 1974 (aged 73); Tweed Heads, New South Wales, Australia
- Source: Cricinfo, 3 October 2020

Urban Heffernan (25 May 1901 – 21 September 1974) was an Australian cricketer. He played in two first-class matches for Queensland in 1924/25.

== See also ==
- List of Queensland first-class cricketers
