= Ryall Ayres =

Australian cricketer

Ryall Sydney Ayres (Tim)
Personal information
- Born: 1 September 1931; Clayfield, Queensland, Australia
- Died: 24 November 1991 (aged 60); Sydney, Australia
- Source: Cricinfo, 1 October 2020

Ryall Ayres (1 September 1931 – 24 November 1991) was an Australian cricketer. He played in four first-class matches for Queensland between 1952 and 1960.

== See also ==
- List of Queensland first-class cricketers
