= Les Dixon (cricketer) =

Australian cricketer

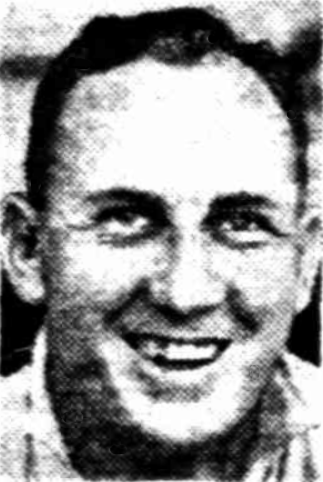

Personal information
- Born: 13 January 1916; Brisbane, Queensland, Australia
- Died: 5 November 1996 (aged 80); Goulburn, New South Wales, Australia
- Source: Cricinfo, 3 October 2020

Les Dixon (13 January 1916 – 5 November 1996) was an Australian cricketer. He played in 30 first-class matches for Queensland between 1936 and 1946.

== See also ==
- List of Queensland first-class cricketers
