= Charles Griffith (Australian cricketer) =

Australian cricketer

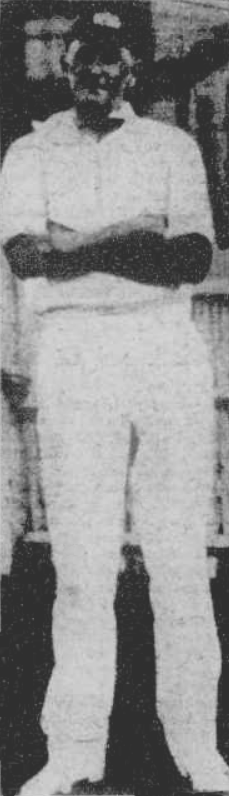

Personal information
- Born: 28 May 1889; Townsville, Queensland, Australia
- Died: 12 May 1928 (aged 38); Rockhampton, Queensland, Australia
- Source: Cricinfo, 3 October 2020

Charles Griffith (28 May 1889 – 12 May 1928) was an Australian cricketer. He played in four first-class matches for Queensland between 1913 and 1924.

== See also ==
- List of Queensland first-class cricketers
