= Sidney Fennelly =

Australian cricketer

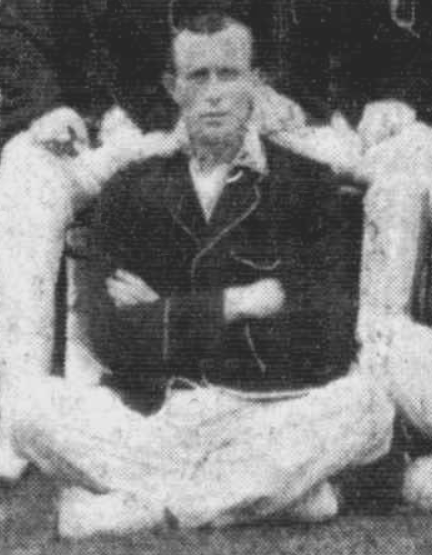

Personal information
- Born: 22 March 1887; Sydney, New South Wales, Australia
- Died: 25 August 1964 (aged 77); Brighton, Queensland, Australia
- Source: Cricinfo, 3 October 2020

Sidney Fennelly (22 March 1887 – 25 August 1964) was an Australian cricketer. He played in twenty-one first-class matches for Queensland between 1909 and 1921.

== See also ==
- List of Queensland first-class cricketers
