= Edward Hubbard (cricketer) =

Australian cricketer

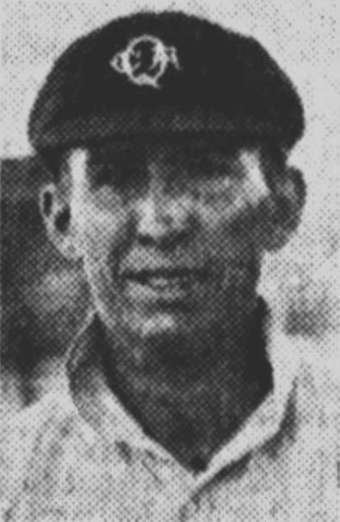

Personal information
- Born: 27 June 1906; Brisbane, Queensland, Australia
- Died: 1 October 1969 (aged 63); Herston, Queensland, Australia
- Source: Cricinfo, 3 October 2020

Edward Hubbard (27 June 1906 – 1 October 1969) was an Australian cricketer. He played in four first-class matches for Queensland between 1929 and 1932.

== See also ==
- List of Queensland first-class cricketers
