= John Leary (cricketer) =

Australian cricketer

Personal information
- Born: 6 October 1867; Bathurst, New South Wales, Australia
- Died: 16 January 1940 (aged 72); Herston, Queensland, Australia
- Source: Cricinfo, 5 October 2020

John Leary (6 October 1867 – 16 January 1940) was an Australian cricketer. He played in one first-class match for Queensland in 1898/99.

== See also ==
- List of Queensland first-class cricketers
