= Grahame Egan =

Australian cricketer (born 1941)

Personal information
- Born: 8 June 1941 (age 85); Armidale, New South Wales, Australia
- Source: Cricinfo, 3 October 2020

Grahame Egan (born 8 June 1941) is an Australian former cricketer. He played in six first-class matches for Queensland between 1963 and 1965.

== See also ==
- List of Queensland first-class cricketers
