= Thomas Faunce (cricketer) =

Australian cricketer

Personal information
- Born: 19 March 1883; Brisbane, Queensland, Australia
- Died: 27 May 1968 (aged 85); Brisbane, Queensland, Australia
- Source: Cricinfo, 3 October 2020

Thomas Faunce (19 March 1883 – 27 May 1968) was an Australian cricketer. He played in four first-class matches for Queensland between 1905 and 1907.

== See also ==
- List of Queensland first-class cricketers
