= Malcolm Biggs =

Australian cricketer

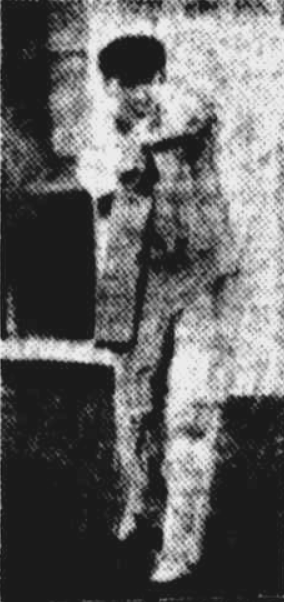

Personal information
- Born: 7 July 1904; Caboolture, Queensland, Australia
- Died: 1 August 1972 (aged 68); Ipswich, Queensland, Australia
- Source: Cricinfo, 1 October 2020

Malcolm Biggs (7 July 1904 – 1 August 1972) was an Australian cricketer. He played in six first-class matches for Queensland between 1927 and 1931.

== See also ==
- List of Queensland first-class cricketers
