= Garry Madders =

Australian cricketer (born 1953)

Personal information
- Born: 21 January 1953 (age 73); Maryborough, Queensland, Australia
- Source: Cricinfo, 5 October 2020

Garry Madders (born 21 January 1953) is an Australian cricketer. He played in three first-class and two List A matches for Queensland in 1979/80.

== See also ==
- List of Queensland first-class cricketers
