= Des Hansen =

Australian cricketer

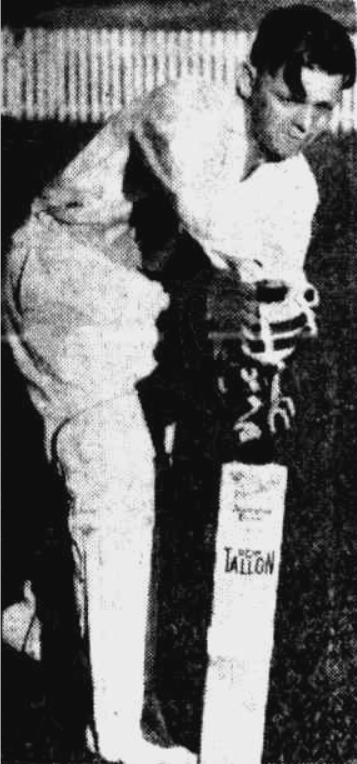

Personal information
- Born: 20 May 1912; Childers, Queensland, Australia
- Died: 25 December 2007 (aged 95); Brisbane, Queensland, Australia
- Source: Cricinfo, 3 October 2020

Des Hansen (20 May 1912 – 25 December 2007) was an Australian cricketer. He played in 30 first-class matches for Queensland between 1931 and 1940.

== See also ==
- List of Queensland first-class cricketers
