= Jim Hackett (cricketer) =

Australian cricketer

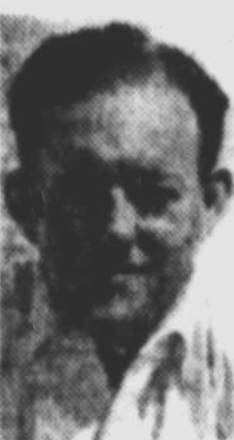

Personal information
- Born: 8 October 1917; Perth, Western Australia
- Died: 13 November 2004 (aged 87); Brisbane, Queensland, Australia
- Source: Cricinfo, 3 October 2020

Jim Hackett (8 October 1917 – 13 November 2004) was an Australian cricketer. He played in two first-class matches for Queensland in 1937/38.

== See also ==
- List of Queensland first-class cricketers
