= Robert Parker (cricketer) =

Australian cricketer (born 1942)

Personal information
- Born: 18 September 1942 (age 84); Toowoomba, Queensland, Australia
- Source: Cricinfo, 6 October 2020

Robert Parker (born 18 September 1942) is an Australian former cricketer. He played in twenty-five first-class matches for Queensland between 1967 and 1972.

== See also ==
- List of Queensland first-class cricketers
