= Keith de Jong =

Australian cricketer (born 1956)

Personal information
- Born: 12 February 1956 (age 70); Mount Lavinia, Ceylon
- Source: Cricinfo, 3 October 2020

Keith de Jong (born 12 February 1956) is an Australian cricketer. He played in four first-class and two List A matches for Queensland in 1981/82.

== See also ==
- List of Queensland first-class cricketers
