= Troy Dixon =

Australian cricketer (born 1969)

Personal information
- Born: 22 December 1969 (age 56); Geelong, Victoria, Australia
- Source: Cricinfo, 3 October 2020

Troy Dixon (born 22 December 1969) is an Australian cricketer. He played in eleven first-class matches for Queensland between 1993 and 2000.

== See also ==
- List of Queensland first-class cricketers
