= Scott Williams (cricketer) =

Australian cricketer (born 1971)

Personal information
- Born: 1 February 1971 (age 55); Brisbane, Queensland, Australia
- Source: Cricinfo, 8 October 2020

Scott Williams (born 1 February 1971) is an Australian cricketer. He played in four first-class and two List A matches for Queensland in 1991/92.

== See also ==
- List of Queensland first-class cricketers
