= Brad Spanner =

Australian cricketer (born 1968)

Personal information
- Born: 9 October 1968 (age 58); Brisbane, Queensland, Australia
- Source: Cricinfo, 9 October 2020

Brad Spanner (born 9 October 1968) is an Australian cricketer. He played in one List A match for Queensland in 1991/92.

== See also ==
- List of Queensland first-class cricketers
