= Raydon Levingston =

Australian cricketer (born 1946)

Personal information
- Born: 17 January 1946 (age 80); Toowoomba, Queensland, Australia
- Source: Cricinfo, 5 October 2020

Raydon Levingston (born 17 January 1946) is an Australian cricketer. He played in one first-class match for Queensland in 1971/72.

== See also ==
- List of Queensland first-class cricketers
