= George Lockie =

Australian cricketer

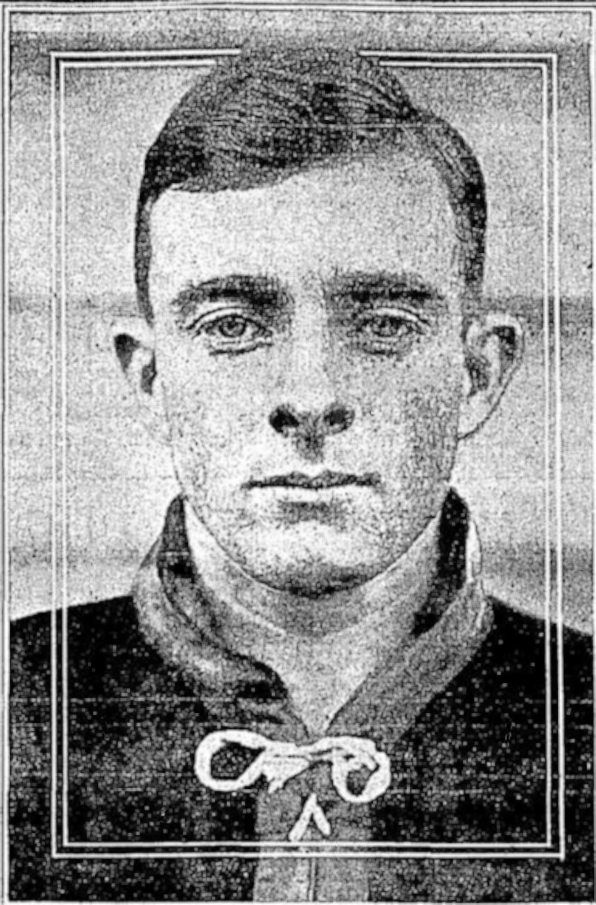

Personal information
- Born: 18 February 1910; Mount Morgan, Queensland, Australia
- Died: 2 November 1971 (aged 61); Brisbane, Queensland, Australia
- Source: Cricinfo, 5 October 2020

George Lockie (18 February 1910 – 2 November 1971) was an Australian cricketer. He played in four first-class matches for Queensland in 1945/46.

== See also ==
- List of Queensland first-class cricketers
