= James Carew (cricketer) =

Australian cricketer

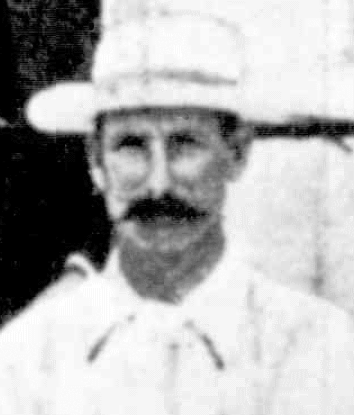

Personal information
- Born: 23 January 1872; Pine Mountain, Queensland, Australia
- Died: 1 September 1950 (aged 78); Kelvin Grove, Queensland, Australia
- Source: Cricinfo, 1 October 2020

James Carew (23 January 1872 – 1 September 1950) was an Australian cricketer. He played in thirteen first-class matches for Queensland between 1898 and 1906.

== See also ==
- List of Queensland first-class cricketers
