= William Duncan (Australian cricketer) =

Australian cricketer

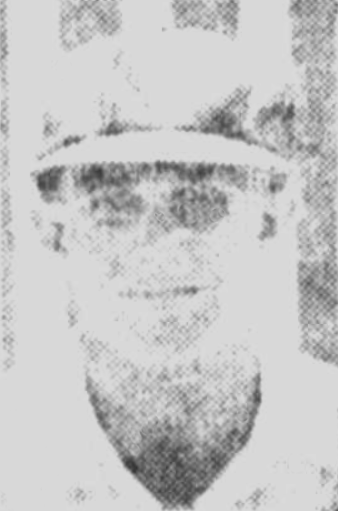

Personal information
- Born: 19 October 1912; Brisbane, Queensland, Australia
- Died: 27 July 1943 (aged 30); Brisbane, Queensland, Australia
- Source: Cricinfo, 3 October 2020

William Duncan (19 October 1912 – 27 July 1943) was an Australian cricketer. He played in one first-class match for Queensland in 1930/31.

== See also ==
- List of Queensland first-class cricketers
