= Robert Willcocks =

Australian cricketer (1891–1965)

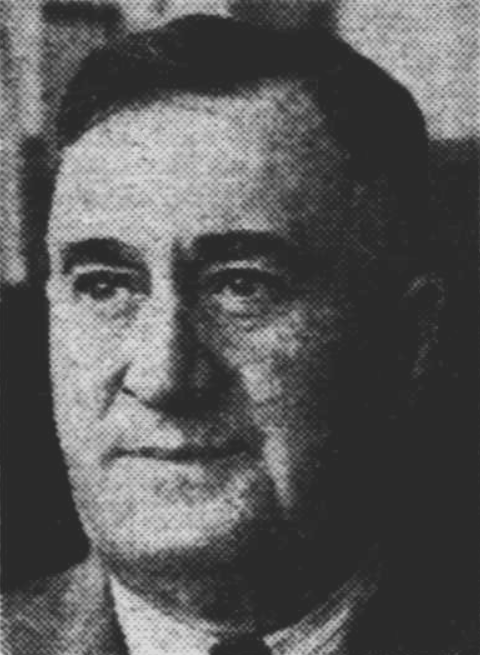

Personal information
- Born: 23 December 1891; Brisbane, Queensland, Australia
- Died: 21 March 1965 (aged 73); Toowoomba, Queensland, Australia
- Source: Cricinfo, 8 October 2020

Robert Willcocks (23 December 1891 – 21 March 1965) was an Australian cricketer. He played in one first-class match for Queensland in 1913/14.

Willcocks achieved early success in sports, winning his school 100 yard swimming title five years in a row and becoming allround All-Schools athletics champion. He also achieved success in football representing the Queensland state team and captaining the state at the age of eighteen and he was also successful in cricket and represented the state.

He retired from sport in his early twenties due to an illness in his family which caused him to move to Western Queensland to take care of family properties. By the late 1940s he was well known as a pastoralist and was director of a leading Brisbane engineering firm.

== See also ==
- List of Queensland first-class cricketers
