= Stan Weir (cricketer) =

Australian cricketer (1904–2002)

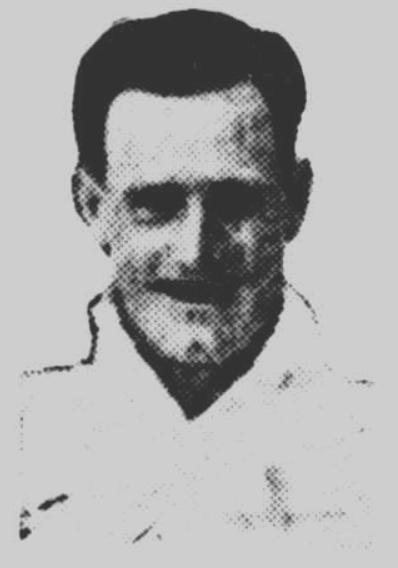

Personal information
- Born: 23 April 1904; Croydon Junction, Queensland, Australia
- Died: 11 June 2002 (aged 98); Maryborough, Queensland, Australia
- Source: Cricinfo, 8 October 2020

Stan Weir (23 April 1904 – 11 June 2002) was an Australian cricketer. He played in one first-class match for Queensland in 1929/30.

== See also ==
- List of Queensland first-class cricketers
