= Kenneth Mossop =

Australian cricketer

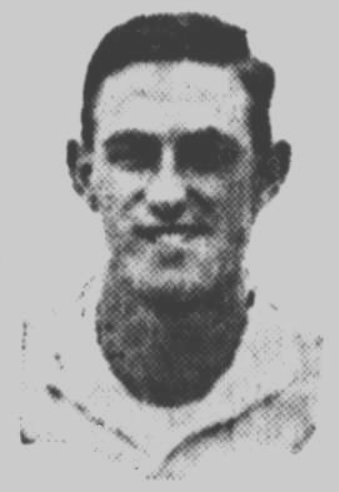

Personal information
- Born: 15 August 1909; New Farm, Queensland, Australia
- Died: 18 September 1975 (aged 66); Surfers Paradise, Queensland, Australia
- Source: Cricinfo, 5 October 2020

Kenneth Mossop (15 August 1909 – 18 September 1975) was an Australian cricketer. He played in fourteen first-class matches for Queensland between 1929 and 1933.

== See also ==
- List of Queensland first-class cricketers
