= John Whalley (cricketer) =

Australian cricketer

Personal information
- Born: 27 November 1872; Brisbane, Queensland, Australia
- Died: 29 October 1925 (aged 52); Brisbane, Queensland, Australia
- Source: Cricinfo, 8 October 2020

John Whalley (27 November 1872 – 29 October 1925) was an Australian cricketer. He played in one first-class match for Queensland in 1904/05.

== See also ==
- List of Queensland first-class cricketers
