= Alan Skuse =

Australian cricketer (born 1942)

Personal information
- Born: 28 March 1942 (age 84); Brisbane, Queensland, Australia
- Source: Cricinfo, 6 October 2020

Alan Skuse (born 28 March 1942) is an Australian cricketer. He played in one first-class match for Queensland in 1967/68.

== See also ==
- List of Queensland first-class cricketers
