= Richard Pyke =

Australian cricketer

Personal information
- Full name: Richard Diamond Pyke
- Born: 15 August 1877; Melbourne, Australia
- Died: 4 December 1914 (aged 37); Gympie, Queensland, Australia
- Source: Cricinfo, 6 October 2020

Richard Diamond Pyke (15 August 1877 – 4 December 1914) was an Australian cricketer. He played in two first-class matches for Queensland between 1903 and 1910. He died while working as a railway official in 1914, with evidence pointing to suicide.

== See also ==
- List of Queensland first-class cricketers
