= Michael McCaffrey (cricketer) =

Australian cricketer (1878–1948)

Personal information
- Born: 18 February 1878; Queensland, Australia
- Died: 31 December 1948 (aged 70)
- Source: Cricinfo, 5 October 2020

Michael McCaffrey (18 February 1878 – 31 December 1948) was an Australian cricketer. He played in five first-class matches for Queensland between 1905 and 1912.

== See also ==
- List of Queensland first-class cricketers
