= Rodney Peterson =

Australian cricketer (born 1967)

Personal information
- Born: 18 May 1967 (age 59); Ipswich, Queensland, Australia
- Source: Cricinfo, 9 October 2020

Rodney Peterson (born 18 May 1967) is an Australian cricketer. He played in one List A match for Queensland in 1991/92.

== See also ==
- List of Queensland first-class cricketers
