= Leonard Waterman =

Australian cricketer

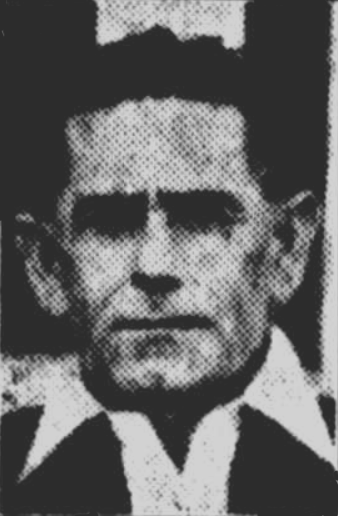
- Waterman (1932)

Personal information
- Born: 18 February 1892; Brisbane, Queensland, Australia
- Died: 1 January 1952 (aged 59); Kangaroo Point, Queensland, Australia
- Source: Cricinfo, 8 October 2020

Leonard Waterman (18 February 1892 – 1 January 1952) was an Australian cricketer. He played in five first-class matches for Queensland between 1931 and 1933.

== See also ==
- List of Queensland first-class cricketers
