= Leslie Shewan =

Australian cricketer

Personal information
- Born: 12 June 1892; Rushworth, Victoria, Australia
- Died: 25 September 1977 (aged 85); Windsor, Victoria, Australia
- Source: Cricinfo, 6 October 2020

Leslie Shewan (12 June 1892 – 25 September 1977) was an Australian cricketer. He played in one first-class match for Queensland in 1924/25.

== See also ==
- List of Queensland first-class cricketers
