= Ernest Cresswick =

Australian cricketer

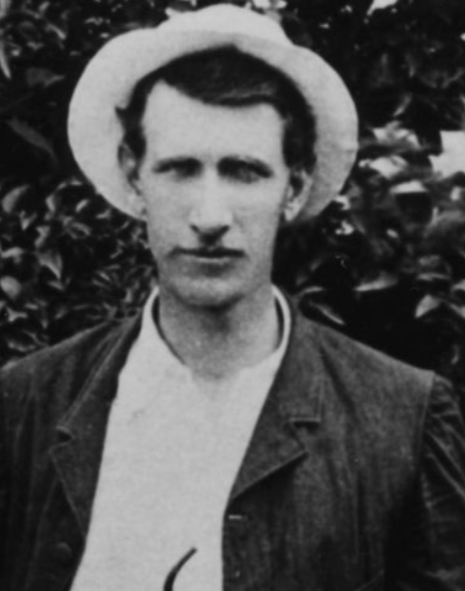

Personal information
- Born: 16 October 1867; Newcastle, New South Wales, Australia
- Died: 23 September 1939 (aged 71); Waverley, New South Wales, Australia
- Source: Cricinfo, 1 October 2020

Ernest Cresswick (16 October 1867 – 23 September 1939) was an Australian cricketer. He played in two first-class matches for Queensland between 1894 and 1896.

== See also ==
- List of Queensland first-class cricketers
