= Clement McFarlane =

Australian cricketer

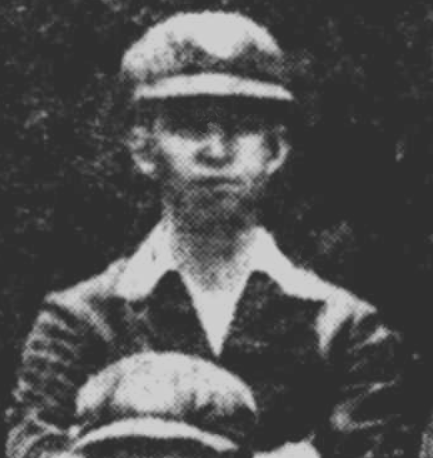

Personal information
- Born: 20 August 1900; Brisbane, Queensland, Australia
- Died: 2 March 1946 (aged 45); Grange, Queensland, Australia
- Source: Cricinfo, 5 October 2020

Clement McFarlane (20 August 1900 – 2 March 1946) was an Australian cricketer. He played in three first-class matches for Queensland between 1924 and 1931.

== See also ==
- List of Queensland first-class cricketers
