= Martin Dunn (cricketer) =

Australian cricketer

Personal information
- Born: 10 May 1883; Maryborough, Queensland, Australia
- Died: 31 December 1942 (aged 59); Woollahra, New South Wales, Australia
- Source: Cricinfo, 3 October 2020

Martin Dunn (10 May 1883 – 31 December 1942) was an Australian cricketer. He played in four first-class matches for Queensland between 1905 and 1908.

== See also ==
- List of Queensland first-class cricketers
