= William Kay (cricketer) =

Australian cricketer

Personal information
- Born: 4 May 1893; Gympie, Queensland, Australia
- Died: 7 July 1973 (aged 80); Taringa, Queensland, Australia
- Source: Cricinfo, 3 October 2020

William Kay (4 May 1893 – 7 July 1973) was an Australian cricketer. He played in three first-class matches for Queensland between 1919 and 1921.

== See also ==
- List of Queensland first-class cricketers
