= Graeme Hogan =

Australian cricketer (born 1966)

Personal information
- Born: 15 March 1966 (age 60); Gympie, Queensland, Australia
- Source: Cricinfo, 9 October 2020

Graeme Hogan (born 15 March 1966) is an Australian cricketer. He played in one List A match for Queensland in 1991/92.

== See also ==
- List of Queensland first-class cricketers
