= Gavin Fitness =

Australian cricketer (born 1968)

Personal information
- Born: 4 June 1968 (age 58); Maryborough, Queensland, Australia
- Source: Cricinfo, 3 October 2020

Gavin Fitness (born 4 June 1968) is an Australian cricketer. He played in three first-class and four List A matches for Queensland between 1993 and 2001.

== See also ==
- List of Queensland first-class cricketers
