= Gilbert Morton =

Australian cricketer

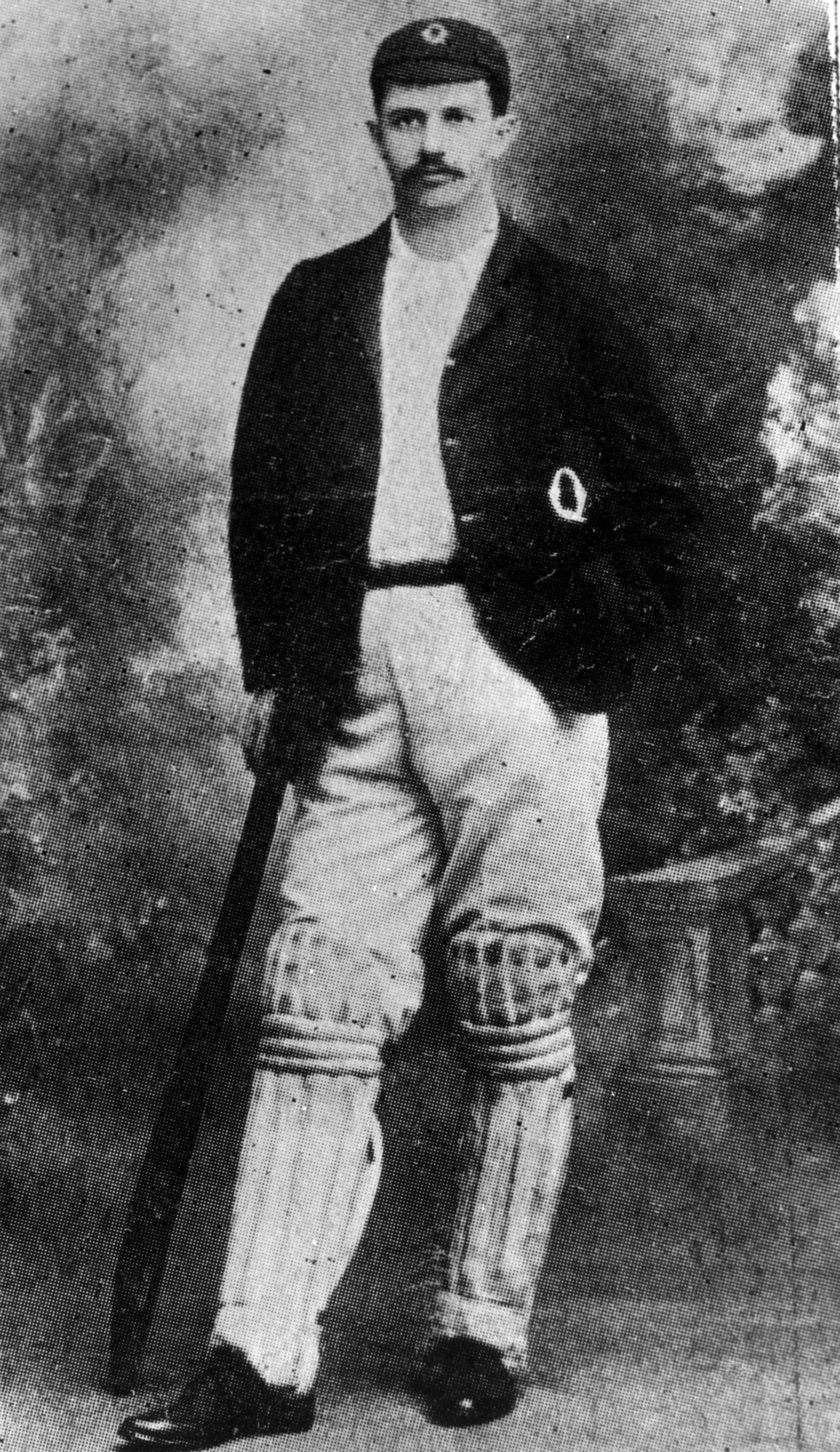

Personal information
- Born: 14 October 1881; Maryborough, Queensland, Australia
- Died: 28 January 1936 (aged 54); Herston, Queensland, Australia
- Source: Cricinfo, 5 October 2020

Gilbert Morton (14 October 1881 – 28 January 1936) was an Australian cricketer. He played in four first-class matches for Queensland between 1904 and 1906.

== See also ==
- List of Queensland first-class cricketers
