= Jimmy Prout =

Australian cricketer

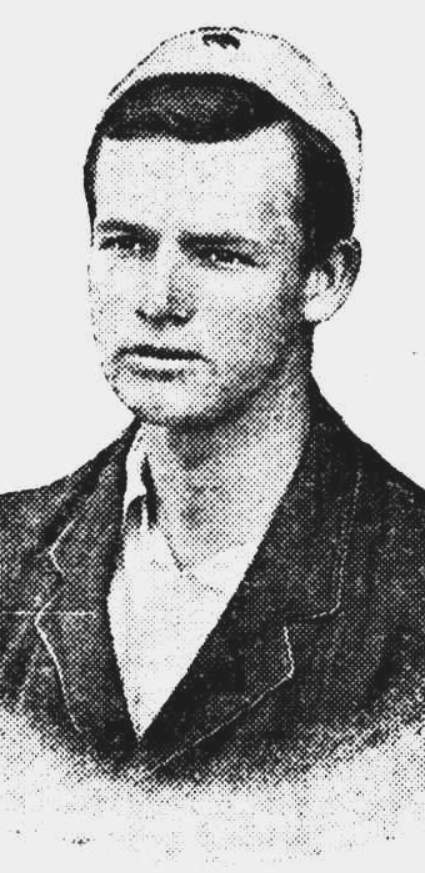

Personal information
- Born: 12 August 1889; Flemington, Victoria, Australia
- Died: 18 February 1952 (aged 62); Double Bay, New South Wales, Australia
- Source: Cricinfo, 6 October 2020

Jimmy Prout (12 August 1889 – 18 February 1952) was an Australian cricketer. He played in four first-class matches for Queensland between 1913 and 1920.

== See also ==
- List of Queensland first-class cricketers
