= Donald Muddle =

Australian cricketer

Personal information
- Born: 26 July 1937 (age 89); The Grange, Queensland, Australia
- Source: Cricinfo, 5 October 2020

Donald Muddle (born 26 July 1937) is an Australian cricketer. He played in eleven first-class matches for Queensland between 1956 and 1961.

== See also ==
- List of Queensland first-class cricketers
