= Damien MacKenzie =

Australian cricketer (born 1980)

Personal information
- Born: 21 July 1980 (age 46); Brisbane, Queensland, Australia
- Source: Cricinfo, 5 October 2020

Damien MacKenzie (born 21 July 1980) is an Australian cricketer. He played in five first-class and ten List A matches for Queensland between 2001 and 2004.

== See also ==
- List of Queensland first-class cricketers
