= Linsley Thorpe =

Australian cricketer

Personal information
- Born: 15 February 1923; Alpha, Queensland, Australia
- Died: 19 June 2009 (aged 86); Toowoomba, Queensland, Australia
- Source: Cricinfo, 8 October 2020

Linsley Thorpe (15 February 1923 – 19 June 2009) was an Australian cricketer. He played in eight first-class matches for Queensland between 1957 and 1959.

== See also ==
- List of Queensland first-class cricketers
