= Paul Twible =

Australian cricketer (born 1957)

Personal information
- Born: 14 December 1957 (age 68); Brisbane, Queensland, Australia
- Source: Cricinfo, 8 October 2020

Paul Twible (born 14 December 1957) is an Australian cricketer. He played in five first-class and four List A matches for Queensland between 1982 and 1987.

== See also ==
- List of Queensland first-class cricketers
