= Robert O'Brien (cricketer) =

Australian cricketer

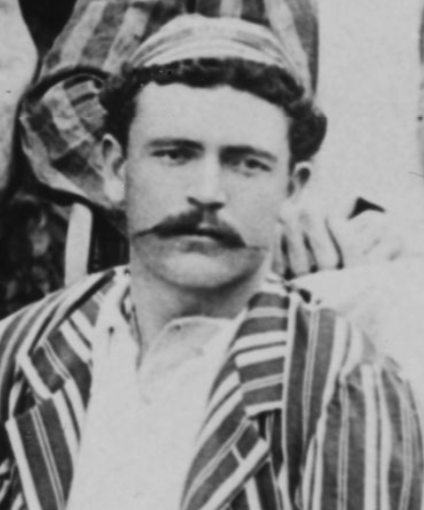

Personal information
- Born: 16 July 1869; Redfern, New South Wales, Australia
- Died: 2 October 1922 (aged 53); Brisbane, Queensland, Australia
- Source: Cricinfo, 6 October 2020

Robert O'Brien (16 July 1869 – 2 October 1922) was an Australian cricketer. He played in four first-class matches for Queensland between 1892 and 1897.

== See also ==
- List of Queensland first-class cricketers
