= George Poeppel =

Australian cricketer

Personal information
- Born: 6 November 1893; Bundaberg, Queensland, Australia
- Died: 2 February 1917 (aged 23); Germany
- Source: Cricinfo, 6 October 2020

George Poeppel (6 November 1893 – 2 February 1917) was an Australian cricketer. He played in one first-class match for Queensland in 1914/15. He died in a prisoner-of-war camp in Germany during World War I.

== See also ==
- List of Queensland first-class cricketers
