= Oswould Hitchcock =

Australian cricketer

Personal information
- Born: 9 September 1859; Shoalhaven, New South Wales, Australia
- Died: 13 July 1948 (aged 88); Brisbane, Queensland, Australia
- Source: Cricinfo, 3 October 2020

Oswould Hitchcock (9 September 1859 – 13 July 1948) was an Australian cricketer. He played in six first-class matches for Queensland between 1894 and 1897.

== See also ==
- List of Queensland first-class cricketers
