= Lance Kahler =

Australian cricketer (born 1977)

Personal information
- Born: 27 June 1977 (age 49); Crows Nest, Queensland, Australia
- Source: Cricinfo, 3 October 2020

Lance Kahler (born 27 June 1977) is an Australian cricketer. He played in two first-class matches and one List A match for Queensland in 1997/98.

== See also ==
- List of Queensland first-class cricketers
