= Darryl King (cricketer) =

Australian cricketer

Personal information
- Born: 6 June 1942; Brisbane, Queensland, Australia
- Died: 3 March 2002 (aged 59); Buderim, Queensland, Australia
- Source: Cricinfo, 3 October 2020

Darryl King (6 June 1942 – 3 March 2002) was an Australian cricketer. He played in eight first-class matches for Queensland between 1962 and 1967.

== See also ==
- List of Queensland first-class cricketers
