= Rodney Lawrence =

Australian cricketer (born 1954)

Personal information
- Born: 8 August 1954 (age 72); Brisbane, Queensland, Australia
- Source: Cricinfo, 5 October 2020

Rodney Lawrence (born 8 August 1954) is an Australian cricketer. He played in eight first-class matches for Queensland between 1974 and 1983.

== See also ==
- List of Queensland first-class cricketers
