= John Loxton =

Australian cricketer (born 1945)

Personal information
- Born: 26 November 1945 (age 80); Ashgrove, Queensland, Australia
- Source: Cricinfo, 5 October 2020

John Loxton (born 26 November 1945) is an Australian cricketer. He played in twenty-two first-class matches for Queensland between 1966 and 1971.

== See also ==
- List of Queensland first-class cricketers
