= Ian Oxenford =

Australian cricketer (1932–2013)

Personal information
- Born: 3 September 1932; Brisbane, Queensland, Australia
- Died: 9 March 2013 (aged 80); Queensland, Australia
- Source: Cricinfo, 6 October 2020

Ian Bruce Oxenford (3 September 1932 – 9 March 2013) was an Australian cricketer. He played in twelve first-class matches for Queensland between 1958 and 1960. Oxenford died in Queensland on 9 March 2013, at the age of 80.

== See also ==
- List of Queensland first-class cricketers
