= Geoff Gray (cricketer) =

Australian cricketer (born 1943)

Personal information
- Born: 27 August 1943 (age 83); Ipswich, Queensland, Australia
- Source: Cricinfo, 3 October 2020

Geoff Gray (born 27 August 1943) is an Australian cricketer. He played in six first-class matches for Queensland between 1968 and 1970.

== See also ==
- List of Queensland first-class cricketers
