= Robert Swendsen (cricketer) =

Australian cricketer (1929–2018)

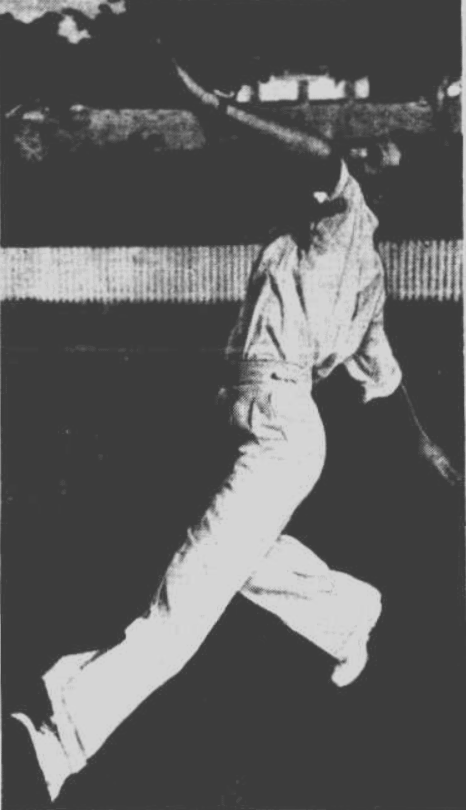

Personal information
- Born: 18 October 1929; Charters Towers, Queensland, Australia
- Died: 18 September 2018 (aged 88); Kirwan, Queensland, Australia
- Source: Cricinfo, 6 October 2020

Robert Swendsen (18 October 1929 – 18 September 2018) was an Australian cricketer. He played in two first-class matches for Queensland in 1948/49. Swendsen died in Kirwan on 18 September 2018, at the age of 88.

== See also ==
- List of Queensland first-class cricketers
