= Richard Spry (cricketer) =

Australian cricketer

Personal information
- Born: 18 July 1862; Melbourne, Australia
- Died: 20 November 1920 (aged 58); Linville, Queensland, Australia
- Source: Cricinfo, 6 October 2020

Richard Spry (18 July 1862 – 10 November 1920) was an Australian cricketer. He played in one first-class match for Queensland in 1892/93.

== See also ==
- List of Queensland first-class cricketers
