= Keith Jack (cricketer) =

Australian cricketer

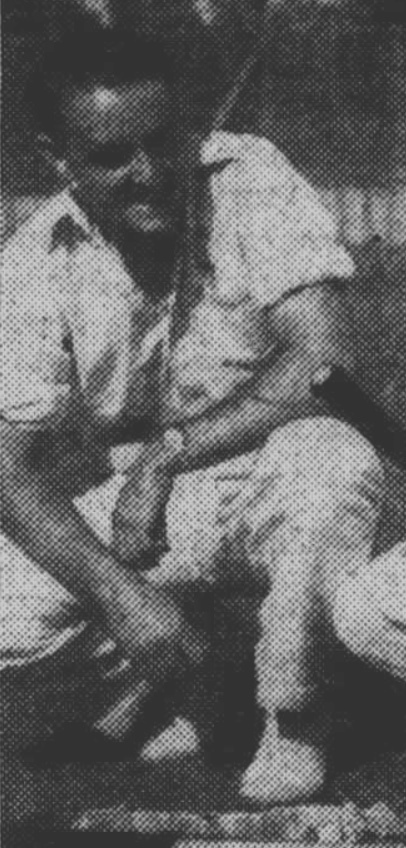

Personal information
- Born: 25 April 1927; Tambo, Queensland, Australia
- Died: 22 November 1982 (aged 55); Buderim, Queensland, Australia
- Batting: Right-handed
- Bowling: Right arm off-break

Career statistics
Competition	First-class
Matches	25
Runs scored	1,104
Batting average	26.92
100s/50s	0/7
Top score	86
Catches/stumpings	10/0

Keith Jack (25 April 1927 – 22 November 1982) was an Australian cricketer. He played in 25 first-class matches for Queensland between 1948 and 1953.
