= Northern Suburbs District Cricket Club =

Personnel
- Captain: (Australia) Kendel Fleming
- Coach: (Australia) Ken Healy

Team information
- Founded: 1927
- Capacity: 5,000

History
- Grade wins: 8
- 1-Day wins: 6
- T20 wins: 1
- Official website: https://northernsuburbscricket.com

Northern Suburbs District Cricket Club is a cricket club playing in the XXXX Gold premiership, the leading club cricket competition in Queensland, Australia. Northern Suburbs District Cricket Club has produced some of the finest players to represent Queensland and Australia in one day and test cricket competition. Many fine players have represented the Northern Suburbs District Cricket Club at club and representative level, such as Ian Healy and Joe Burns.

== Club history ==
In 1925-26 the Metropolitan Electorate Cricket Competition, played under the auspices of the Queensland Cricket Association, was contested in three grades by teams representing South Brisbane, Valleys, Western Suburbs, Eastern Suburbs and Toombul Electorate Clubs as well as the University of Queensland Cricket Club.

To provide additional opportunities for players to participate in the competition, the number of teams competing in the "A" grade competition for the following season was increased to eight by the inclusion of two colts sides. Further teams were also included in the lower grades. This move was not a success and in 1927 it was decided to create a new electorate club centred on the Kelvin Grove City District, with certain areas previously covered by the Toombul, Western Suburbs and Valley Clubs being allocated to it.

The inaugural meeting of this club was held on 28 June 1927 and was presided over by Alderman E Lanham. It was granted affiliation with the Queensland Cricket Association for the 1927–28 season under the name of Kelvin Grove Electorate Cricket Association. In 1928 the fledgling Club changed its name to Northern Suburbs Electorate Cricket Club and subsequently became known as Northern Suburbs District Cricket Club in 1931.

== Location ==
The club is based at Shaw Park in the Brisbane suburb of Wooloowin.

== Executive committee ==
The executive committee for 2020/2021 was:

- Mr Paul Keller - President
- Mr Jon Hopes - Vice President & Chairman of Selectors
- Mr Tony Comerford - Treasurer
- Mr Mitchell Witt - Secretary
- Mr Michael Wright - Executive
- Mr Andrew Campbell - Executive
- Mr Henry Coventry - Executive
- Mr Adam Lavis - Executive

== Competitions ==
Currently Norths has teams entered in the following competitions:

Grade - Xxxx Gold Grade Competition (2-day competition)

- 1st Grade - The First Grade Competition
- 2nd Grade - The Alan Pettigrew Shield
- 3rd Grade - The Norm McMahon Shield
- 4th Grade - The Bob Spence Shield
- 5th Grade - The Roy Tanner Shield
- 6th Grade - The WEP Harris Shield

One-day competitions

- 1st Grade - One Day Competition
- 1st Grade Twenty/20
- Over 40s One Day Competition

Under age competitions

- Under 19 - One Day Competition
- Under 17 - Two day Competition (Lord's Taverners)

Women's Competitions

- 2nd Grade - The Second Grade Shield
- Opens - The Rebecca McCoombes Cup
- Under 16 - The Paul Pink Shield

== Awards ==
Awards for the 2009/2010 season included:

- Q F Rice Memorial Trophy. Awarded for the most outstanding cricketer in the club: Joe Burns
- W T Rhoades Memorial Trophy. Awarded for the most outstanding performer from the senior grade fixtures outside of first grade, the player being recognised as our champion of the lower grades: Jordan Buckley
- Alan Pettigrew Memorial Trophy. Awarded for an outstanding performance from players in the senior grades: Andrew Michael
- E.A. Toovey MBE, OAM Trophy. Awarded to the most outstanding under 17 cricketer: Nicholas Sale
- Bob McColm Trophy. Awarded to the batsman with the highest aggregate of runs in the senior grades from the fixture rounds: Joe Burns
- Charles Family Perpetual Trophy. Awarded for an outstanding performance in the senior grades: Dane Hutchinson
- Roger Harris Perpetual Trophy. Awarded to our most outstanding Under 19 player: Tim Gregory
- Robin Pascoe Perpetual Trophy. Awarded for an outstanding bowling performance: Dane Hutchinson
- Bryan Phelan Perpetual Trophy. Awarded to the most outstanding player in the over 40s competition: Dom Ovenden
- Ian Kerr Memorial Trophy. Awarded for outstanding dedication to the club off the field: Tony Commerford
- Stan Boucaut Memorial Trophy. Awarded for an outstanding contribution to the club by a player: Greg Pyne
- Ovenden Trophy. Awarded for an outstanding fielding performance - either fielding or Wicket-keeping: Ben Dunk
- Betty Kerr Perpetual Trophy. Awarded to the most outstanding women cricketer in the club: Courtney Jones
- Women's Coaches Award. Awarded by the coach to the most improved player: Angela Earle

== Merit Medallions ==
Each season Norths recognises the most outstanding cricketers from the grade competition. In the 2009/2010 season these were:

- Wally Wright
- Andrew Michael
- Jacob Harris
- Jordan Buckley
- Joe Burns

Special Awards and Mentions: Jordan Buckley - Award 2nd Grade for 1000 runs and 100 wickets

== Player of the Week ==
The Players of the Week during the 2009/2010 season were:

- Week 2 - Andrew Michael (1st Grade) 95 no v Redlands
- Week 7 - Tim Gregory 123 v Valley (Maiden century on debut in 1st Grade)
- Week 13 - Brenton Goves (6th Grade) 179 no v Redlands
- Week 16 - Dom Michael (1st Grade ODC) 96 v Toombul
- Week 17 - Joe Burns (1st Grade) 148 v Gold Coast District Cricket Club

== Junior Club ==
Wilston Norths Junior Cricket Club is a junior club associated with the Northern Suburbs District Cricket Club. WNJCC was awarded the title of "Champion Club" in the Brisbane North Junior Cricket Association in 2009–2010.

== See also ==
- Cricket in Queensland
