= Nick Stevens (cricketer) =

Australian cricketer

Personal information
- Full name: Nicholas Gerard Stevens
- Born: 20 May 1994 (age 32); Toowoomba, Queensland, Australia
- Batting: Right-handed
- Bowling: Right-arm off break
- Role: Batsman

Domestic team information
- Years: Team
- 2013/14–2014/15: Queensland

Career statistics
Competition	First-class
Matches	6
Runs scored	264
Batting average	29.33
100s/50s	1/0
Top score	158
Catches/stumpings	1/–
- Source: ESPNcricinfo, 20 December 2022

Nicholas Gerard Stevens (born 20 May 1994) is a former Australian cricketer. A right-handed batsman, he played six first-class matches for Queensland between 2013 and 2015.

== Cricket career ==
Born in Toowoomba, Queensland, Stevens began playing for Gold Coast in Queensland Premier Cricket in 2008, and first played for the first-grade side in 2010 when he was 16. He received a rookie contract with Queensland for the 2011/12 season, and in 2012 he was selected in the Australian squad for the Under-19 Cricket World Cup.

Stevens was named a supplementary player for the Brisbane Heat for the 2012/13 and 2013/14 Big Bash League seasons but did not play any games for the side. His Queensland rookie contract was renewed for the 2012/13 and 2013/14 seasons, and he made his first-class debut in late 2013. He had been selected in place of Greg Moller who had suffered a knee injury and he injured his own knee in the field on the first day which prevented him from taking part in the rest of the game and disrupted his season.

For the 2014/15 season, he received a full state contract with Queensland, and upon returning to the first-class side after injury he scored his first century against South Australia at the Adelaide Oval. He was selected in a Cricket Australia Developmental XI which played the touring India team shortly after the century, and in January 2015, he was selected in an Australian XI which played the Bangladesh World Cup squad as a warmup.

For the 2015/16 season, Stevens received a rookie contract rather than a full contract, and his contract was not renewed for 2016/17. As of the 2018/19 season, he had moved to Valley in grade cricket and he had a strong start to the season earning selection for the Queensland Academy of Sport and playing a Queensland Second XI game, moving towards reselection in the first-class side.
