= Jim Coats =

Australian cricketer (1914–2002)

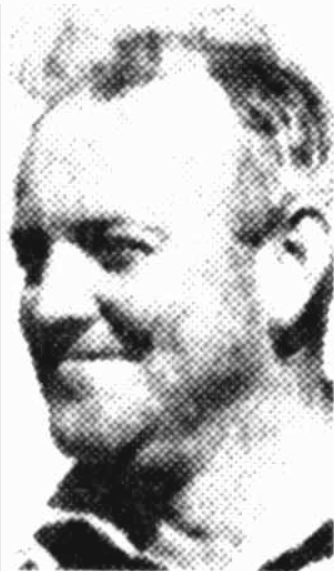

Personal information
- Born: 26 February 1914; Annerley, Queensland, Australia
- Died: 8 June 2002 (aged 88); Brisbane, Queensland, Australia
- Source: Cricinfo, 1 October 2020

Jim Coats (26 February 1914 – 8 June 2002) was an Australian cricketer. He played in three first-class matches for Queensland in 1937/38.

== Cricket career ==
Coats attended Brisbane Grammar School where he developed his abilities as an opening batsman and he was later coached by Sidney Redgrave. In 1932 he was selected in a Queensland Colts side to play a New South Wales Colts side. As of 1932 he was reported to be strong on the legside but weak on the offside with a sound defense as a batsman.

Coats had a strong start to his career in Brisbane Grade Cricket, playing for Northern Suburbs, and in 1935 he was selected as twelfth man for Queensland in a home game against New South Wales, however he had to decline the selection as he was on holiday in Sydney since he had not been given any notice he may be selected. His form fell away in 1936 and he left Northern Suburbs to play in the lower standard Warehouse cricket competition however after scoring 297 runs averaging 99.00 in the competition he returned to Northern Suburbs and scored what was described as a "flawless" century for the club against Valley in late 1937 which resulted in him being seriously considered for selection for Queensland for the away games of the 1937/38 Sheffield Shield.

Coats was selected for Queensland for the 1937/38 interstate games however although at the time he was regarded as one of the best batting prospects for Queensland his highest score was 46 and he averaged just 21 in his three First-class matches and was not selected again. He struggled in grade cricket after his First-class games scoring poorly in the 1938/39 season and he began his 1939/40 season averaging just 12.5 for Northern Suburbs but in November 1939 he was able to score an 83 against University.

As of September 1940 Coats was undergoing militia service and it was unclear if he would receive leave privileges in order to continue playing for Norths, but as of March 1941 he was playing for Norths. By March 1943 he had become a Staff-Sergeant and was continuing to represent Norths. By December 1944 Coats was playing for the Supply team in Australian services cricket. In December 1945 Queensland played Victoria and lost and Coats omission from the side was noted as a possible reason for the loss as he had been one of the better Queensland batsman in the 1940's and a consistent scorer for Norths. As of February 1948 he was captaining Norths, and he continued captaining the side until December 1952.

Coats retired prior to the 1953/54 season however he was called out of retirement for a game for Norths in October 1953 as Ern Toovey was suffering from the flu. In December 1953 he was a delegate for Norths to the Queensland Cricket Association meeting. In 1954 he returned to grade cricket to captain the Colts side for the 1954/55 season.

== See also ==
- List of Queensland first-class cricketers
