= Mark Gaskell =

Australian cricketer

Mark Gaskell (Australian cricketer)
Personal information
- Born: 17 October 1956 (age 70); Brisbane, Queensland, Australia
- Source: Cricinfo, 3 October 2020

Mark Gaskell (born 17 October 1956) is an Australian cricketer. He played in sixteen first-class matches and three List-A matches for Queensland between 1977/78 and 1982/83. His father, Brian, was a life member of Queensland Cricket who played for Eastern Suburbs in Brisbane Grade Cricket and served as State Director of Coaching.

== Early life ==
Gaskell was born and raised in Brisbane, Queensland, Australia. He attended Brisbane State High School.

He commenced his cricket career at Wynnum Manly in Brisbane Grade Cricket and ultimately succeeded his brother-in-law Wayne Broad as captain of the club in 1988.

== Career ==
Gaskell debuted in First-class cricket for Queensland as an opening batsman in the 1977-78 season. His batting was described as "entertaining" in a Sheffield Shield match against New South Wales, and he opened with West Indian Test player Alvin Kallicharran who was playing for Queensland in a game against Western Australia. He struggled at the start of the 1978-79 season, struggling to score runs quickly, and was dropped in November 1978 for John Buchanan after failing in two games. In November 1981 he was recalled to the Queensland First-class side when opener Martin Kent withdrew from the team due to a back injury, and in December he played for Queensland in a tour game against the West Indian Test team.

Gaskell has continued to play cricket into old age and in 2019 he captained the Australian Over-60's side on a tour of England. As of 2020 he was owner of Gabba Sporting Goods which that year donated thousands of dollars of cricket equipment to assist young Zimbabweans in the sport with Gaskell noting he had visited Zimbabwe and understood the importance of such a donation due to the difficult situation in the country.

== See also ==
- List of Queensland first-class cricketers
