= Phillip Bawden =

Australian cricketer (born 1953)

Personal information
- Born: 2 September 1953 (age 73); Lismore, New South Wales, Australia
- Source: Cricinfo, 1 October 2020

Phillip Bawden (born 2 September 1953) is an Australian cricketer who was a fast bowler. He played in one List A match for Queensland in 1973/74.

Bawden debuted in Brisbane Grade Cricket for Sandgate-Redcliffe in the 1972/73 season and he later also played for Toombul. His nickname became Sir and he was reported by his peers as having notable pace as a fast bowler but with little control.

== See also ==
- List of Queensland first-class cricketers
