= 1984–85 Sheffield Shield season =

Australian cricket tournament

- Cricket format: First-class
- Tournament format(s): Double round-robin & Final
- Champions: New South Wales (38th title)
- Participants: 6
- Matches: 31
- Player of the series: David Boon (Tasmania)
- Most runs: Peter Clifford (New South Wales) (889)
- Most wickets: John Inverarity (Western Australia) (41) & Carl Rackemann (Queensland) (41)

The 1984–85 Sheffield Shield season was the 83rd season of the Sheffield Shield, the domestic first-class cricket competition of Australia. New South Wales won the championship.

== Points table ==
Team	Pld	W	WLF	L	LWF	DWF	DLF	ND	Pts
New South Wales	10	4	0	0	0	4	2	0	80
Queensland	10	4	0	1	2	1	2	0	76
South Australia	10	2	2	4	0	1	1	0	60
Western Australia	10	1	1	1	0	3	3	1	42
Victoria	10	0	0	3	1	3	2	1	18
Tasmania	10	0	0	2	0	3	5	0	12

== Final ==
15–19 March 1985
Scorecard

Queensland	v	New South Wales (H)
374 (170.3 overs); Trevor Hohns 103; Imran Khan 4/66 (27.3 overs)		318 (121.3 overs); Steve Smith 76; Jeff Thomson 3/83 (273 overs)
163 (77 overs); Ray Phillips 47; Imran Khan 5/34 (19 overs)		223/9 (93.2 overs); Peter Clifford 83*; Carl Rackemann 6/54 (30.2 overs)

New South Wales win by 1 wicket
Sydney Cricket Ground, Sydney
Umpires: Dick French and Mel Johnson

- Queensland won the toss and elected to bat.
- Jeff Thomson (Queensland) claimed his 600th wicket in first-class matches.

== Statistics ==
=== Most Runs ===
Peter Clifford 889

=== Most Wickets ===
John Inverarity 41 & Carl Rackemann 41
