= Gold Coast District Cricket Club =

Gold Coast
- Nickname: Dolphins
- League: Queensland Premier Cricket

Personnel
- Captain: (Australia) Matthew Kuhnemann
- Coach: (Australia) Chris Swan

Team information
- Colours
- Founded: 1990
- Home ground: Kerrydale Oval
- Capacity: 5,000

History
- Grade wins: 2
- 1-Day wins: 2
- T20 wins: 2
- Official website: goldcoastdolphins.com.au

The Gold Coast District Cricket Club is a cricket club on the Gold Coast, Queensland, Australia who play in the Queensland Premier Cricket competition. The club was founded in 1990. It has won the Queensland Premier Cricket First Grade Premiership twice, in the 2002/03 and 2008/09 seasons, the competitions One-Day Premiership twice, in 1992/93 and 2009/10, and the Twenty20 Premiership twice in 2009/10 and 2020/21. They are reigning Queensland Premier Cricket T20 Champions.

== History ==
The club was founded in 1990 to provide development for Gold Coast cricket talent and a pathway to First-class cricket. It entered Brisbane grade cricket as the Colts team had been disbanded shortly prior leaving a vacancy in the competition.

In 2018 the Queensland State Government Female Friendly Facilities Fund provided $500,000 to upgrade changing rooms for players and officials at Bill Pippen Oval, Kerrydale. In 2019 the club was shortlisted for the Australian Premier Cricket Club of the Year at the A Sport for All Awards due to its excellent development of players, creating positive experiences for the community, and pioneering women's and all-abilities cricket.

== First-class cricketers ==
Below is a partial list of Gold Coast Dolphins cricketers who have played at First-class level or higher.

- Peter Anderson
- Xavier Bartlett
- Max Bryant
- Greg Campbell
- Ross Chapman
- Daniel Doran
- Sam Hain
- Graeme Hick
- Matthew Kuhnemann
- Ben McDermott
- Greg Moller
- Matthew Mott
- Scott Muller
- Michael Neser
- Bruce Oxenford
- Andrew Robinson
- Billy Stanlake
- John Stephenson
- Nick Stevens
- Steve Storey
- Chris Swan
- Andrew Symonds

== See also ==
- Cricket Gold Coast
- Cricket in Queensland
