= Steve Storey =

Australian cricketer (born 1964)

Personal information
- Born: 23 November 1964 (age 61); Mona Vale, New South Wales, Australia

Domestic team information
- Years: Team
- 1989/90–1993/94: Queensland

Career statistics
Competition	FA	List A
Matches	20	7
Runs scored	619	110
Batting average	22.10	22.00
100s/50s	1/2	0/0
Top score	103	48
Balls bowled	2852	306
Wickets	31	8
Bowling average	48.32	27.62
5 wickets in innings	1	0
10 wickets in match	0	n/a
Best bowling	5/55	2/29
Catches/stumpings	8/0	1/0
- Source: Cricinfo, 6 October 2020

Steve Storey (born 23 November 1964) is an Australian cricketer who was a left-arm spin-bowling allrounder. He played in twenty first-class and seven List A matches for Queensland between 1989 and 1994.

== Career ==
Storey was from Newcastle and began his cricket career with Wallsend District Cricket Club in Newcastle District Cricket before playing two seasons for Mosman in Sydney Grade Cricket. However, he disliked living in Sydney and moved to Queensland as he had a brother who lived on the Gold Coast. He made his First-class debut for Queensland in 1989 against South Australia at the Gabba and he performed well with the bat; a report stated that he "proved it was a stage on which he belongs". Allan Border, who played in the match, said in an interview shortly after Storey's innings "I was very impressed with that debut. He made me look ordinary." He adjusted to First-class level and performed well as an aggressive lower order batsman and capable spin bowler.

In January 1990 Bob Hawke selected Storey in the Prime Minister's XI for a match against Pakistan at Manuka Oval, and ahead of the match he was described as an exciting prospect who had shown ability with the bat. Also in January 1990 he represented Queensland in a two-day practice game against Sri Lanka in Rockhampton and scored 40 and went 2 for 16. Storey struggled in the 1990/91 season and in a match against Western Australia in January 1991 he bowled too short, was no-balled six times for overstepping, and conceded 36 runs from nine overs, and was reportedly "foolishly" run out for a duck.

Storey began playing for Gold Coast in Brisbane Grade Cricket during the 1990s. Ahead of the 1992/93 season he had been dropped by Queensland, partly due to Peter Taylor becoming the States primary spinner in the previous season, but he scored 204 against Souths setting the record highest score for Gold Coast and earning him reselection for the State. By October 1992 Storey was back in the Queensland side, primarily as the No. 6 bat, and he was being described as a part-time bowler rather than an allrounder, but that month he took a five-wicket haul against Western Australia. Interviewed shortly afterwards, he said "I've been working hard on my bowling but I also want to get it together with the bat."

In December 1992, Storey scored his first First-class century. In January 1993 he was dropped from the Queensland First-class side for Stuart Law, but recalled shortly before the match he was to be omitted from due to concerns at the fitness of spinner Paul Jackson. He was dropped from the side for the majority of the 1993/94 season, but was recalled for one game in which he scored two ducks and took one wicket, which was his last in First-class cricket.

Storey returned to New South Wales in the 1990s after his Queensland career and played for Wallsend in Newcastle cricket, again serving as captain of the side. In one of his last seasons before retiring, he took 80 wickets and scored over 800 runs. In 2007 he began participating in practice sessions with Wallsend again, and in 2015 he became President of the club. In 2016 he came out of retirement to captain the clubs first grade side due to the team lacking experienced players.

== See also ==
- List of Queensland first-class cricketers
