= Harsha de Silva (coach) =

Sri Lankan cricket coach (born 1972)

Personal information
- Born: 8 April 1972 (age 54); Colombo, Sri Lanka
- Batting: Right-handed
- Bowling: Right-arm medium
- Role: All-rounder

Domestic team information
- Years: Team
- 1991–1996: Colts Cricket Club

Career statistics
| Competition | First-class |
|---|---|
| Matches | 14 |
| Runs scored | 260 |
| Batting average | 16.25 |
| 100s/50s | 0/1 |
| Top score | 56* |
| Balls bowled | 767 |
| Wickets | 11 |
| Bowling average | 37.18 |
| 5 wickets in innings | 0 |
| 10 wickets in match | 0 |
| Best bowling | 3/40 |
| Catches/stumpings | 5/– |
- Source: Cricinfo, 8 August 2018

Harsha de Silva (born 8 April 1972) is a former Sri Lankan first-class cricketer who played for Colts Cricket Club in 14 first-class cricket matches between 1991 and 1996. After his playing career, he had two spells as the coach of the Sri Lanka Women's National Cricket Team, first between 2010 and 2013 and later from 2018 to 2020.

== Coaching career ==
After retiring from playing first-class cricket matches in 1996, he went onto become a cricket coach and a mentor to schoolboy cricketers in Sri Lanka as well as in Australia where he served as the coach of the Wynnum Manly District Cricket Club and the women cricketers at the Valley District Cricket Club. He was a junior level coach from 1996 to 2001 for his own school, Saint Joseph's College, Colombo, and became a professional school cricket coach for St. Joseph's College in 2001. He is also known for mentoring some of the current Sri Lankan international cricketers including Angelo Mathews, Thisara Perera and Dimuth Karunaratne.

He had a spell as head coach of the Sri Lanka Women's Team between 2010 and 2013. On 8 August 2018, after a five-year gap, he was reappointed as the head coach of the women's team by Sri Lanka Cricket, after the resignation of previous coach Hemantha Devapriya. In August 2020, he was sacked as the head coach of the Sri Lanka women's cricket team and was replaced by Lanka de Silva.
