= William Fisher (cricketer) =

Australian cricketer

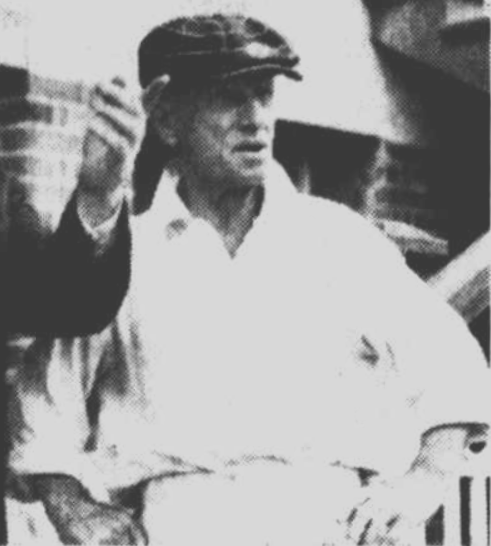

Personal information
- Full name: William Thornton Fisher
- Born: 31 August 1865; Brisbane, Queensland
- Died: 1 June 1945 (aged 79); Herston, Queensland
- Source: Cricinfo, 5 June 2020

William Thornton Fisher (31 August 1865 – 1 June 1945) was an Australian cricketer. He played two first-class matches for Queensland between 1892–93 and 1893–94. He was South Brisbane's first captain in Queensland district cricket.

== Cricket career ==
Fisher was playing cricket for the Alberts club in Brisbane in the 1880s and in 1886 he was a member of an Alberts side which played a Rockhampton XI and was noted as one of the standout players. In 1887 he began playing for Blackalls Club, and in November 1887 he was selected to represent Queensland in a non First-class tour game against the touring English side, and he played for Queensland against the English again in a second tour game in December.

In January 1888 Fisher was selected to represent a Combined XI for clubs in the senior cricket association in Brisbane which played a Combined XI for clubs from the junior association. He was playing for Alberts Cricket Club again in 1888, and was noted as one of the best batsmen in Queensland for the year having the highest average in senior cricket, 25.63 from sixteen innings. In March 1889 he was selected to represent Queensland again in a non First-class inter-colonial cricket match against New South Wales which Queensland won, although Fisher was run out for four in Queensland's innings. He won the Alberts club trophy for best batting in 1889, having scored 101 not out in the season which was the highest for the club.

In 1891 Fisher played in a match for Indooroopilly Cricket Club, in addition to continuing to represent Alberts, and in March he also represented Queensland again in an intercolonial match. In 1892 Fisher scored 205 in a match for the B.I. Club in a game against Brisbane Hospital which was the record score for the season, and he also won the Alberts Club trophy for best batting again for averaging 32.00 over ten innings for the club. As of October 1892 Fisher was keeping wicket for Alberts, and by January 1893 he was captaining the side.

Queensland was granted first-class status in the 1892–93 season, and in April 1893 Fisher was selected in the inaugural state first-class side in a match played against New South Wales in Brisbane scoring 11 in both of Queensland's innings. In March 1894 he was selected again for Queensland's second first-class game which was played in Sydney against New South Wales and he scored 11 and 7.

Fisher continued to play for Albert into 1895. In 1897 the Queensland Cricket Association disbanded the senior cricket competitions, instead establishing an electoral cricket competition with new clubs defined by residents in electorates being formed to compete in it. Fisher joined the newly formed South Brisbane Club and was appointed to a committee to find a cricket ground for the club, and served as the first captain of the club when the 1897–98 season began. He was still captaining the side as of 1904, and 1905 appears to have been his final year playing for the club. In 1904 he began playing in a cricket competition for people working for overseas shipping companies representing the A.U.S.N. Company Ltd.

In September 1905 Fisher captained a side for a benefit match for retiring cricketer William Swain, and in September 1907 he captained a Brisbane team which played a match in Waterford at an evening which also featured a concert and a dance. In 1908 he played in an annual game between a Francis's XI and Beaudesert C.C. playing for Francis's XI. In 1909 he returned to Waterford with another team and scored 40 runs batting at 10, and the same year he played 'holiday cricket' captaining an A.U.S.N. Company side against a side of the crew of the ship Wyreema. In 1911 he played in a Veterans match between teams of veteran cricketers from Brisbane and Ipswich, captaining the Brisbane team.

In 1924 Fisher was one of several Queensland team-mates of Percy McDonnell who attended a tribute ceremony. In 1934 Fisher visited Sydney to attend a Sheffield Shield match between Victoria and New South Wales and a tennis tournament.

== See also ==
- List of Queensland first-class cricketers
