= Charles Morgan (Queensland cricketer) =

Australian cricketer

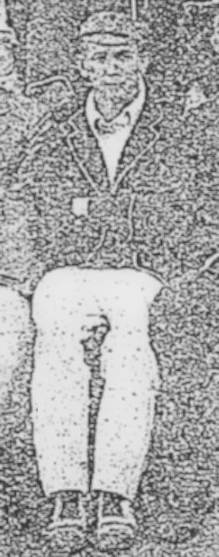

Personal information
- Born: 10 January 1877; Sydney, Australia
- Died: 12 July 1942 (aged 65); Brisbane, Australia
- Source: Cricinfo, 5 October 2020

Charles Morgan (10 January 1877 – 12 July 1942) was an Australian cricketer. He played in seven first-class matches for Queensland between 1899 and 1906.

Morgan played for Valley in Brisbane electorate cricket and was a highly successful batsman at district level being referred to as the "Trumper of Brisbane". He scored 258 not out in a district game setting the record for highest score in Brisbane cricket which stood until the 1980's.

After his playing career Morgan coached cricket at secondary schools in Brisbane. In 1934 the Queensland Cricket Association was criticized for not doing more to support former players and Morgan was mentioned as a player who had contributed to Queensland cricket and was deserving of financial support.

== See also ==
- List of Queensland first-class cricketers
