= South Brisbane District Cricket Club =

South Brisbane
- Nickname(s): Souths, Magpies
- League: Queensland Premier Cricket

Personnel
- Captain: (Australia) Aryan Jain
- Coach: (Australia) Ken Healy

Team information
- Colours
- Founded: 1897
- Home ground: Fehlberg Park
- Capacity: 5,000

History
- Grade wins: 21
- 1-Day wins: 4
- T20 wins: 0
- Official website: southbrisbanedcc.com

South Brisbane District Cricket Club is a cricket club in South Brisbane, Queensland, Australia. They were founded in 1897 and compete in the Queensland Premier Cricket competition.

South Brisbane is the equal most successful side in the Queensland Premier Cricket First-grade competition having 21 Premierships alongside Toombul. They dominated the 1900s winning the premiership in six out of ten seasons in the decade, and also notably won three consecutive premierships from 1962 to 1964, but the club has also achieved success consistently throughout its history winning premierships in every decade except the 1920s and 1950s, however it has not found success in recent years winning its last First-grade premiership in 2001.

In the shorter formats South Brisbane won four One-Day titles in the 1980s and has yet to win a T20 title. In women's cricket in 2021 the club announced it was establishing a women's team to compete in women's First-grade cricket beginning in the 2022/23 season.

== History ==
=== Early teams playing under the name ===
The current South Brisbane Cricket Club was not established until 1897, however some teams played under the name prior to this. In August 1859 a public meeting was held for South Brisbane residents at a local store for the purpose of organising a cricket club, and in 1861 a South Brisbane cricket team organised a match against a North Brisbane team on Easter Monday on the Green Hills near the Reservoir which poor weather prevented from taking place until April 13. The match was attended by the Governor and his wife and reportedly a noteworthy number of ladies. North Brisbane won the game by four wickets.

In 1867 a combined side selected from sixteen independent South Brisbane cricket clubs was selected to play against the eleven from Shafston club at Kangaroo Point, and the South Brisbane team won. In 1872 the South Brisbane Union Cricket Club petitioned the city Municipal Council to be allowed to have exclusive use of an area of land used as a cricket ground in South Brisbane which was used by multiple independent South Brisbane clubs, however the petition was rejected on the grounds that it would be problematic to prevent the other clubs from using the land.

In 1888 a meeting was held at the Boundary Hotel to establish a new cricket club to replace the defunct Montague Cricket Club which had been a senior South Brisbane side. The new club initially named itself Belvidere, but forgot to announce its name and when another club was formed with that name it assumed the name South Brisbane Cricket Club instead and chose the colours light-blue and white. It joined a Junior Cricket Association and competed in the 1888–89 season, but was unable to compete in the senior competition. In February 1889 the South Brisbane Cricket Club held a successful Concert and Ball to raise club funds at the West End School of Arts. In April 1889 the club played a Combined Logan District XI in Beaudesert. As of October 1890 the club were competing in a senior competition. In October 1891 a separate club was formed under the name the Second South Brisbane Cricket Club which was to compete in a Junior Cricket Association.

The first South Brisbane Cricket Club was still active as of 1896, and played a game as late as March 1897, however in May 1897 the Queensland Cricket Association decided to disband its senior competitions and form a new competition with new clubs based on electorate boundaries.

=== Early years ===
On 13 August 1897 a general meeting was held in the South Brisbane Council Chambers chaired by the Mayor of South Brisbane at which it was proposed that a South Brisbane electoral cricket club be formally established according to the constitution and rules of the Queensland Cricket Association. The proposition was accepted and the club was formed under the name the South Brisbane Electoral Cricket Club. It was formed with forty members and a club fee of one guinea was set in order to raise funds to construct a proper South Brisbane cricket ground. On August 24, 1897, a committee of the club drove around South Brisbane to identify a suitable area to establish a cricket ground and they decided that one could be built in Musgrave Park. By September 1897 the club had grown to seventy members, however rather than establishing a cricket ground it had secured practice wickets at the Brisbane Cricket Ground, a turf wicket in the Botanic Gardens, and permission to compete at the Brisbane Cricket Ground for A Grade matches and Queen's Park for B Grade matches.

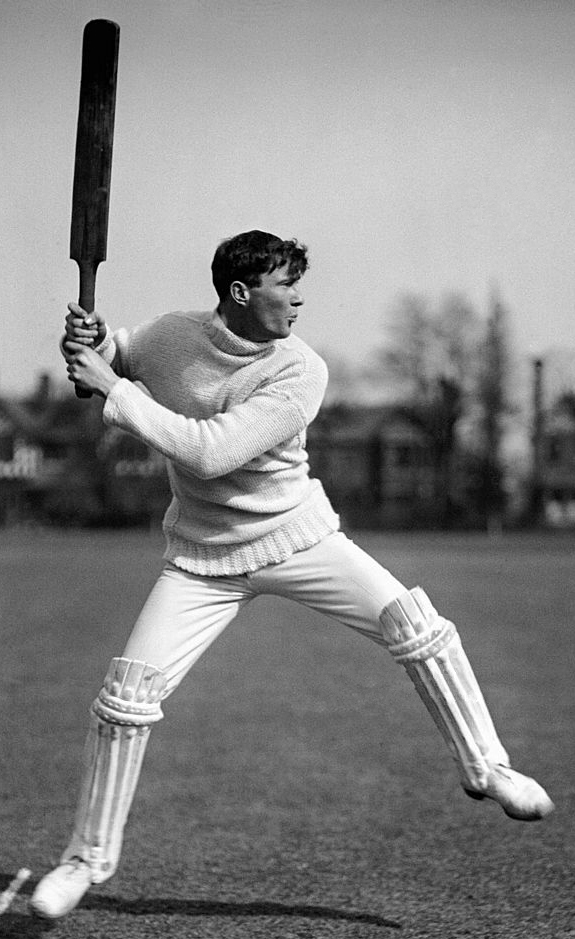
Alan Marshal (c. 1905), batsman instrumental to South Brisbane's success in the 1900s.

William Fisher, who had played first-class cricket for Queensland, was made the club's first captain and on September 25 the club played its first game against the North Brisbane Cricket Club at Queen's Park, and its first actual competition match was against Toowong on October 2. South Brisbane won its first fixture against Toowong by an innings and 113 runs. In South Brisbane's first season, 1897–98, the club played six A grade games winning two, losing two, drawing two, and one being forfeited by the opposition. South Brisbane's Sydney Donahoo, who had played First-Class cricket for Victoria, topped the competition run aggregate with 299 runs for the season. The club also fielded a B grade side which played four games winning two but forfeiting two of their scheduled games due to being unable to locate a ground to play on, and at the 1898 club general meeting South Brisbane decided to approach the trustees of Musgrave Park about establishing a turf wicket there. In the 1898–99 season South Brisbane finished bottom of the ladder in the A Grade competition, winning just one of their twelve games and losing the other eleven. 1899–1900 was a better season for the club with W.B. Griffith topping the competition aggregate with 253 runs, although in March 1900 a South Brisbane player was suspended for the remainder of the 1899–1900 season for bad language during a match. In September 1900 the club was informed by the Queensland Cricket Association that the Association could not assist them in establishing or maintaining a wicket, although in October the Association did provide South Brisbane financial assistance.

South Brisbane won the 1900-01 premiership and to celebrate the players were hosted at a dinner by the Mayor of South Brisbane. Alan Marshal had the highest batting average in the premiership season for the club at 33.7, and the most runs in the competition with 329. Tasman Long had the lowest bowling average for the club at 7.6, and H.B. Griffith took 50 wickets which was the most of anyone in district cricket for the season. At the club's 1901 general meeting it decided to re-establish a B grade team and secure a B grade playing wicket in West End reserve, and as of December the club was using West End Reserve. At the 1902 general meeting it was decided that the A grade team would be selected from the club members by a selection committee, with a B grade selection committee then being allowed to select from any remaining club members, rather than players being graded into either class, however at the 1903 general meeting it was decided to have only one three member selection committee. In mid-1903 the club decided to try to secure land in West End Reserve to permanently establish an independent club cricket ground. On 7 September 1903 the South Brisbane Cricket Club emulated its namesake by holding a dance at the West End School of Arts, and it also held a fundraising concert at the School in November.

South Brisbane won the A Grade Premiership again in 1903–04, and their bowler Albert Henry had the best bowling average in the season taking 59 wickets at 9.3. They finished third in the 1904-05 A grade season, however they did not submit any statistics to the Queensland Cricket Association, so no averages were recorded for the club at the time, although it is known that Alan Marshal scored 750 runs, the most in the competition for the season, and scored a 221. In the 1905–06 season South Brisbane finished second losing only three matches and their bowling was cited as a strength with W. B. Hayes being the standout player for the side scoring 500 runs and taking 84 wickets, the record allround season performance in Brisbane grade cricket at the time. In January 1906 Brisbane had three players, T. Faunce, W. B. Hayes, and J. Thomson, selected for a practice match used to select the state side for a match against Victoria.

South Brisbane won the premiership in 1906–07, and went back-to-back also winning the premiership in 1907–08, for which they were awarded the "Courier Cup", which the chairman of the Queensland Cricket Association remarked had a "capacity sufficiently large to carry enough refreshment for the whole team." when presenting it to the side. Charles Barstow took 86 and 61 wickets for South Brisbane in the two seasons topping the competition in both. South Brisbane won the premiership in the 1908–09 season with W.B. Hayes taking 83 wickets and topping the competition tally. They also won in 1909–10, achieving four consecutive premierships, with Sidney Redgrave scoring 732 runs to top the competition tally. A highlight for South Brisbane in 1909 was Charles Barstow taking 10 for 34 in an innings.

In the 1910–11 season Sidney Redgrave scored six centuries setting the record for centuries in a season in Queensland district cricket, and in 1911-12 South Brisbane batsman Alan Marshal topped the senior season batting for average and aggregate with 778 runs at 58.50. The following season the club won the 1912-13 premiership, with W.B. Hayes again topping the league for wickets with 53, and Leo O'Connor topping the aggregate runs with 429. In 1913 the Queensland Cricket Association restructured electorate cricket in the state allocating the electorate areas of South Brisbane and Kurilpa to the South Brisbane Electorate cricket club, and in 1913-14 six local clubs in South Brisbane and Kurilpa fell under the South Brisbane clubs jurisdiction. Despite not winning South Brisbane was described as one of the strongest sides of the 1913–14 season with K. Hunter topping the season aggregate with 229 runs, and had two players, Sidney Redgrave and Leo O'Connor, selected for the Queensland state side. In 1915 the Queensland Cricket Association suspended the club competition due to the First World War, although in what would have been the 1916–17 season the Association secretary did schedule a handful of friendly matches between sides including South Brisbane.

=== After WWI ===
On 3 January 1919 the South Brisbane Club organised a game against a side of soldiers returned from the War to welcome them back. On January 6 the club held a meeting in which plans were made to continue with cricket again due to the end of the war. A district cricket season commenced that year, with Sidney Redgrave captaining South Brisbane, and they finished top of the ladder, but lost to Valley in the final based on first innings score as the game was washed out. C. Sim topped the competition runs for South Brisbane for 1919–20 with 265.

In December 1920 the Club decided to rent the Davies Park cricket ground from the South Brisbane City Council, however in October 1921 the ground was vandalised with the match wicket and practice wickets being destroyed. The club had begun playing cricket in the park on Sundays, and around the same time drew the ire of the council for this who sent a letter instructing the club to cease Sunday cricket which South Brisbane felt was condescending. By September 1922 the relationship had mended and the Council and Club collaborated on developing the outfield of Davies Park.

== Queensland Premier Cricket Premierships ==
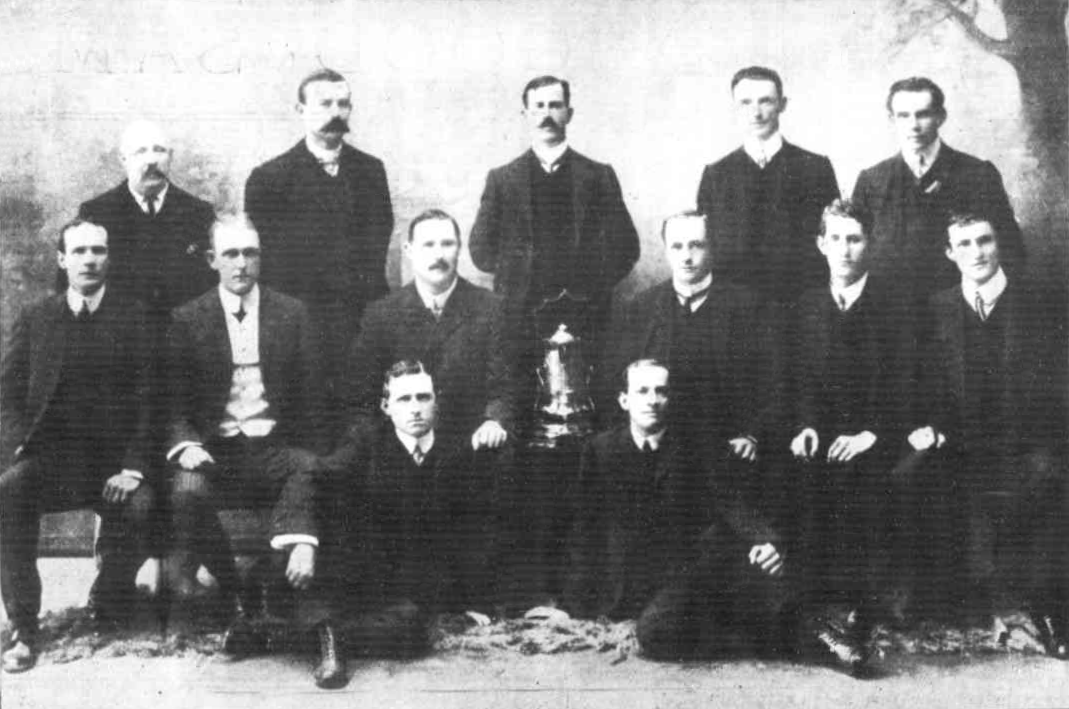
South Brisbane side in 1908, during the club's most successful era.

- 1900-01
- 1903-04
- 1906-07
- 1907-08
- 1908-09
- 1909-10
- 1912-13
- 1935-36
- 1939-40
- 1961-62
- 1962-63
- 1963-64
- 1966-67
- 1968-69
- 1976-77
- 1977-78
- 1983-84
- 1985-86
- 1988-89
- 1990-91
- 2000-01

== Queensland Premier Cricket One-Day Premierships ==
- 1979-80
- 1982-83
- 1985-86
- 1989-90

== First-class cricketers ==
Below is a partial list of Souths players who have played first-class cricket.

- Leonard Balcam
- Charles Barstow
- Andy Bichel
- Greg Chappell
- Ben Cutting
- Sydney Donahoo
- William Fisher
- Lynwood Gill
- W. B. Hayes
- Albert Henry
- Arthur Jones
- Tasman Long
- Alan Marshal
- Craig McDermott
- Leo O'Connor
- Sidney Redgrave
- Gurinder Sandhu
- Billy Stanlake
- Mark Steketee
- Cecil Thompson
- Sam Trimble

== See also ==
- Cricket in Queensland
