= Wayne Broad =

Australian cricketer (born 1956)

Personal information
- Full name: Wayne Ronald Broad
- Born: 20 June 1956 (age 70); Brisbane, Queensland, Australia
- Batting: Right-handed
- Bowling: Right-arm medium
- Role: Batsman
- Relatives: Ryan Broad (son)

Domestic team information
- Years: Team
- 1977/78–1986/87: Queensland

Career statistics
Competition	First-class	List A
Matches	34	12
Runs scored	1,531	207
Batting average	26.39	20.70
100s/50s	1/6	0/2
Top score	120	85
Balls bowled	877	388
Wickets	8	9
Bowling average	54.37	34.77
5 wickets in innings	0	0
10 wickets in match	0	0
Best bowling	3/20	3/71
Catches/stumpings	19/–	4/–
- Source: CricketArchive, 10 January 2014

Wayne Ronald Broad (born 20 June 1956) is a former first-class cricketer who played for Queensland from 1977 to 1987, mostly as a batsman and medium-paced bowler. His son, Ryan, also played cricket for Queensland.

Broad played for Wynnum Manly in Brisbane Grade Cricket and he held the record for the most runs scored for the club until his son surpassed his tally in 2015.
