= Errold La Frantz =

Australian cricketer

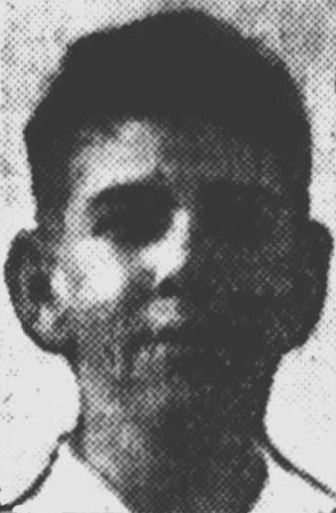

Personal information
- Full name: Errold Campbell La Frantz
- Born: 25 May 1919; Wooloowin, Queensland, Australia
- Died: 20 February 2015 (aged 95); Kallangur, Queensland, Australia
- Batting: Left-handed
- Bowling: Right-arm leg spin

Domestic team information
- Years: Team
- 1941: Queensland

Career statistics
Competition	FC
Matches	1
Runs scored	13
Batting average	6.50
100s/50s	0/0
Top score	7
Balls bowled	48
Wickets	0
Bowling average	n/a
5 wickets in innings	0
10 wickets in match	0
Best bowling	0/11
Catches/stumpings	0/-
- Source: CricketArchive, 24 April 2015

Errold Campbell La Frantz MBE (25 May 1919 – 20 February 2015) was an Australian cricketer, administrator, and commentator. He played a single first-class match for Queensland during the 1941–42 season.

From Brisbane, La Frantz's sole match at state level came against New South Wales in November 1941, at a time when the Sheffield Shield competition was suspended. He was 22 at the time of his debut, and had played matches for Queensland Colts sides during the previous seasons. La Frantz, a left-handed batsman who bowled leg spin with the opposite hand, came in third in both innings of his first-class debut, behind openers Geoff Cook and Rex Rogers. He was bowled by Bill O'Reilly for six in the first innings, and made seven in the second innings before being dismissed in the same fashion by Ray Lindwall, who was also making his first-class debut. He was Lindwall's first, first class wicket. However La Frantz feared more Eddie Gilbert who La Frantz claimed was the fastest bowler of the generation. La Frantz told of facing Gilbert during a match while playing for Queensland Colts, and Gilbert's delivery thumped into the wicket keeper's gloves before La Frantz had had a chance to raise his bat past waist height. He was the only bowler ever to intimidate La Frantz in the "pre-Bodyline" era. La Frantz enlisted in the Australian Army less than two weeks later, and reached the rank of warrant officer class two by the end of the war with Mention in Dispatches

In 1954, following the death of Tom Allen, La Frantz was made a Queensland state selector. He gained life membership of Toombul District Cricket Club, his club in the Brisbane Grade Cricket competition, in 1958, and life membership of the Queensland Cricket Association in 1971. He was also granted life membership of his beloved Nudgee Golf Club in later life. The owner of a Brisbane sports store, he was particularly prominent in junior cricket circles, and helped to organise the first formal junior association in Brisbane and he, along with best friend Ces Anstey considered the establishment and ongoing success of junior cricket in Queensland as their greatest legacy. From 1959 to 1973, La Frantz was a cricket commentator for ABC TV in Brisbane. In that capacity, he called the final over of the inaugural Tied Test, played at the Gabba in 1960. Through his business connections, in 1974 La Frantz secured a job for Australian Test player Jeff Thomson at a car dealership, which helped to secure his move from New South Wales to play for Queensland. He also lured other prominent players to Queensland at this time including Greg Chappell. He was awarded the MBE for services to cricket in 1977, and also received the Australian Sports Medal in 2000. La Frantz died in Brisbane in February 2015, aged 95. At the time of his death, he was the oldest living Queensland player, and one of the oldest in Australia.
