= Chilla Christ =

Australian cricketer

Personal information
- Full name: Charles Percival Christ
- Born: 10 June 1911; Milton, Brisbane, Queensland
- Died: 22 January 1998 (aged 86); Redcliffe, Queensland
- Batting: Left-handed
- Bowling: Slow left-arm orthodox, left-arm medium-pace

Domestic team information
- Years: Team
- 1937-38 to 1946-47: Queensland

Career statistics
Competition	First-class
Matches	24
Runs scored	179
Batting average	6.88
100s/50s	0/0
Top score	32
Balls bowled	5,747
Wickets	56
Bowling average	42.64
5 wickets in innings	1
10 wickets in match	0
Best bowling	5/47
Catches/stumpings	17/–
- Source: Cricinfo, 15 September 2019

Charles Percival "Chilla" Christ (10 June 1911 – 22 January 1998) was an Australian cricketer who played first-class cricket for Queensland from 1937 to 1947.

== Cricket career ==
Chilla Christ (his family name rhymes with "mist") was a left-arm spin bowler who also bowled medium-pace later in his career. He was first chosen to play for Queensland against Victoria in 1930-31 when they were short of players, but the match was rained off, and he had to wait another seven years for his debut. His best figures were 5 for 47 and 2 for 56 in Queensland's victory over New South Wales in 1938–39.

Christ was highly successful in the Brisbane competition. In March 1941, he took 8 for 28 and 9 for 33 for Western Suburbs against Valley. In 1942–43, captaining Western Suburbs, he set a Queensland Cricket Association record for the most wickets in a season, 107 at 8.79. In September 1945, he took 6 for 2 against Valley.

He served as one of the state selectors in the 1940s. He retired as a player in November 1949. He was made a life member of the Western Suburbs club in 1950.

== Personal life ==
Christ married Theresa Gough in August 1940. A primary school teacher, he was promoted from a position at Junction Park State School in Brisbane to be the head teacher at the primary school in the small town of Wyandra in south-western Queensland at the start of 1950. Beginning as a pupil teacher at the age of 14, he taught for 52 years with the Queensland Department of Education; in eight of his 11 schools he served as principal.
