= Robert Joyce =

Robert or Bob Joyce may refer to:

- Rob Joyce, American government official
- Robert Dwyer Joyce (1830–1883), Irish poet and writer
- Robert Francis Joyce (1896–1990), American prelate of the Roman Catholic Church
- Robert Hayman-Joyce (born 1940), British military officer
- Bob Joyce (ice hockey) (born 1966), Canadian ice hockey player
- Bob Joyce (baseball) (1915–1981), American baseball player
- Bob Joyce (athlete) (1936–2025), Australian hurdler
- Bob Joyce (cricketer) (born 1947), Australian cricketer

== See also ==
- Joyce Roberts, English table tennis player
