= Arthur Jones (Australian cricketer) =

Australian cricketer (1874–1917)

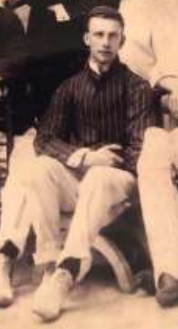

Personal information
- Born: 17 December 1874; Brisbane, Queensland, Australia
- Died: 2 December 1917 (aged 42); Salisbury Plain, Wiltshire, England
- Source: Cricinfo, 3 October 2020

Arthur Jones (17 December 1874 – 2 December 1917) was an Australian cricketer who began his career as a spin bowler but later improved his batting and kept wicket. He played in three first-class matches for Queensland between 1897 and 1911. In his career he was a lawyer.

== Personal life ==
Jones married Gertrude Mabyn Lawry in 1900 and in 1902 they had a son, Alan, while living in Queensland. At some point after 1915 the family moved to Perth, Western Australia.

In January 1917 Jones enlisted in the army in Fremantle under the assumed name Richard Paul Mitchell, was appointed a Lance Corporal in April, and sailed to England for training in the Salisbury Plain Training Area in June. He was demoted to Private in October for absence without leave after midnight and in November he was admitted to the military hospital, where he died of chronic nephritis in December.

== Cricket career ==
Jones began his cricket career in Rockhampton playing for the Alberts cricket club however by 1897 he had moved to Brisbane, where he was playing for a Brisbane club and in March he took an 8 for 35 in a match against the Graziers club and was praised for "splendid bowling" and fielding "grandly". In April he was named as an emergency substitute for Queensland for a First-class match against New South Wales, and he ultimately played in the match with a Sydney paper noting he bowled a "slow peculiar break".

When Brisbane electorate cricket was established in late 1897 Jones played for the South Brisbane club and was noted to have "greatly improved form with the bat" early in the inaugural season. In April 1898 Jones was selected in a combined Brisbane side to play a Rockhampton XI and a Rockhampton paper reported he had greatly improved since leaving Rockhampton ahead of the game. By 1900 Jones had moved to Toombul in Brisbane district cricket, and he also played for the club in 1901. In 1902 he was back at South Brisbane, and in January 1903 he hit two large sixes for South Brisbane at Exhibition ground in a match with one going over the grounds fence into the road and the other landing on a nearby railway bridge. As of December 1904 he was still playing for South Brisbane.

In July 1905 Jones moved to Toowoomba, going into partnership with a Toowoomba lawyer, and by November he was playing cricket for Toowoomba. In April 1906 he selected a side of Toowoomba cricketers which played Toombul in a match which Toowoomba won. He scored 346 runs at 26.7 with Toowoomba's only century and took 13 wickets at 10.5 in his first season with the side. In 1909 he notably hit three sixes in one over in an innings of 51 for Toowoomba.

In late 1910 the touring South African international side played a match against Toowoomba and Jones was described as the "hero of the local side" after the first days play as he scored 39 with eight fours before being dismissed. He scored 82 in Toowoomba's second innings however Toowoomba lost the match by an innings. He was selected to play for the Queensland State side in Sydney and Melbourne due to his performance against South Africa, which resulted in some criticism in Toowoomba as locals felt there were more talented cricketers in Toowoomba. After his State games a Brisbane paper noted there was nothing wrong with his performance which included well executed strokes all around the wicket and a score of 67 against Victoria, however he was dropped from the State side after failing to score against New South Wales.

As of 1913 Jones was captaining Toowoomba, however that year it was noted his form had declined and he was described as "failing miserably", although he was keeping wicket to an acceptable standard. As of 1914 Jones was a member of Toowoomba's senior selection committee, and he continued to represent the side until as late as January 1915.

== See also ==
- List of Queensland first-class cricketers
