= Angus Marshall =

Australian cricketer

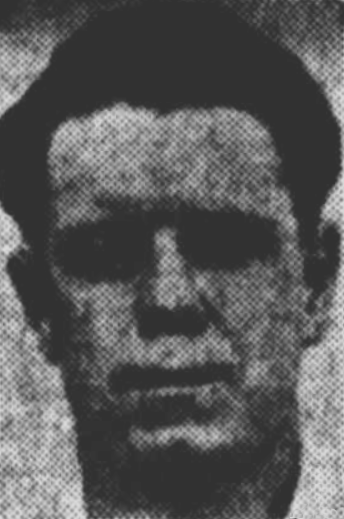

Personal information
- Born: 27 January 1906; Essequibo, British Guiana
- Died: 29 August 1969 (aged 63); Nundah, Queensland, Australia
- Source: Cricinfo, 5 October 2020

Angus Marshall (27 January 1906 – 29 August 1969) was an Australian cricketer. He played in four first-class matches for Queensland between 1929 and 1933. He also played for Toombul District Cricket Club. He played soccer for the Australia men's national soccer team and for Queensland.

== See also ==
- List of Queensland first-class cricketers
