= William Abell (cricketer) =

Australian cricketer

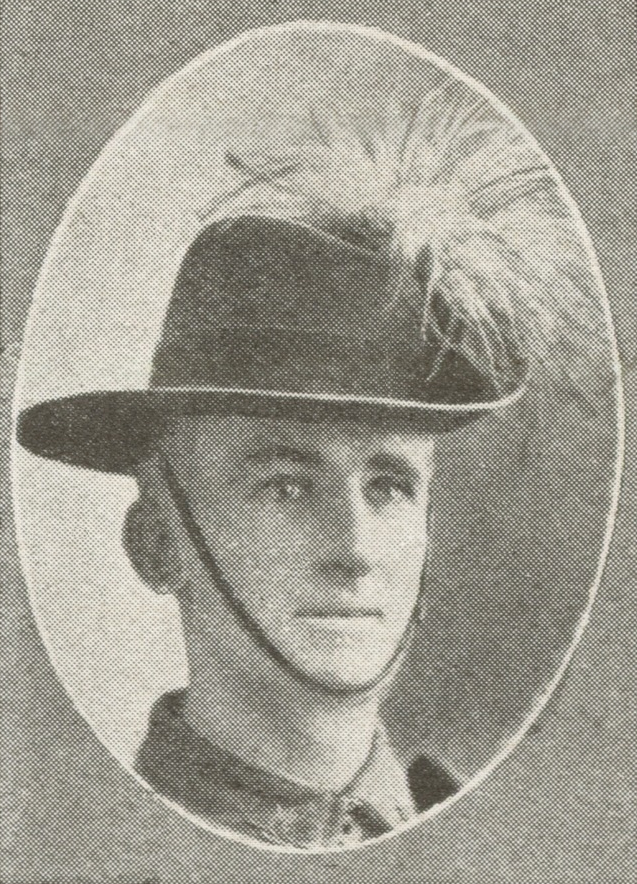

Personal information
- Full name: William Mutlow Abell
- Born: 16 April 1874; Leeds
- Died: 10 June 1960 (aged 86); Herston, Queensland

Career statistics
Competition	First class
Matches	1
Runs scored	8
Batting average	4
100s/50s	0/0
Top score	8
Balls bowled	0
Wickets	0
Bowling average	-
5 wickets in innings	0
10 wickets in match	0
Best bowling	-
Catches/stumpings	1/0
- Source: , 26 June 2016

William Abell (16 April 1874 – 10 June 1960) was an Australian cricketer. He played one first-class match for Queensland in 1902.

As of 1896 Abell was playing for Glenolive Cricket Club in senior cricket. By 1899, after Brisbane electoral cricket was established, he was playing for Toowong representing their B team.

In December 1902 Abell represented Queensland in a first-class game against New South Wales which was the first between the states since 1899. In Queensland's first innings he hit two consecutive fours before being bowled, and was caught at mid-off for a duck in their second innings. He was Queensland's wicket keeper and took one catch in New South Wales first innings.

After his cricket career Abell settled in Granville, New South Wales. He died in 1960.

== See also ==
- List of Queensland first-class cricketers
