= Alex Kemp (cricketer) =

Australian cricketer

Personal information
- Born: 2 December 1988 (age 37); Brisbane, Queensland, Australia
- Source: Cricinfo, 3 October 2020

Alex Kemp (born 2 December 1988) is an Australian cricketer. He played in six first-class matches for Queensland in 2012.

== Cricket career ==
Kemp began playing in Brisbane Grade Cricket in 5th Grade when he was fourteen for Easts-Redlands District Cricket Club, who he eventually captained, and he played for Queensland junior sides from Under-15's to Under-19's. He received a rookie deal with Queensland ahead of the 2009/10 season, which he retained for the next two seasons, playing First-class cricket in the 2011/12 season in which Queensland won the Sheffield Shield. He scored 59 runs at an average of 14.75 in his three games.

Kemp was named a Brisbane Heat supplementary player for the 2012/13 Big Bash League, but he was delisted by Queensland prior to the 2012/13 season. In September 2012 he was recalled by the State due to a strong performance in a Futures League 2nd XI game, and he played three First-class games before the end of 2012 scoring 76 runs at an average of 15.20. In May 2013 he received a full Queensland State contract, and in August 2013 he was named a supplementary player for the Brisbane Heat in the Champion's League Trophy. He was selected in one game for the Heat during the Champion's League, however the match was abandoned without a ball being bowled due to rain.

Kemp's Queensland contract was not renewed in 2014, and he moved to New South Wales where he joined the Randwick-Petersham club in Sydney Grade cricket during the 2014/15 season and scored 1000 1st Grade runs for the club during the remainder of the season and the 2015/16 season. He was appointed Captain of the club ahead of the 2016/17 season but handed over the Captaincy a few games into the 2017/18 season due to a loss in form.

In 2017 Kemp spent three months as a Cricket New South Wales ACA intern as a Pathway Coach and was then appointed as a youth pathway coach responsible for assisting elite young players in Metropolitan North East for Cricket New South Wales. In 2019 he served as assistant coach for the ACT/NSW Country Comets side, and as of 2020 he was working for Cricket NSW as a Coach and Talent Specialist responsible for developing coaches and players.

== See also ==
- List of Queensland first-class cricketers
