= William Bradley (cricketer) =

Australian cricketer (1867–1948)

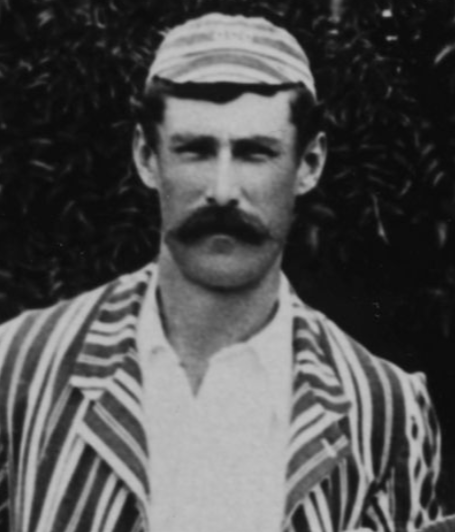

Personal information
- Full name: William Francis Bradley
- Born: 8 October 1867; Brisbane, Queensland
- Died: 7 September 1948 (aged 80); Ipswich, Queensland
- Source: Cricinfo, 5 June 2020

William Francis Bradley (8 October 1867 – 7 September 1948) was an Australian cricketer. He played fifteen first-class matches for Queensland between 1892–93 and 1899-1900 and was the state team's first first-class captain and wicket-keeper.

== Cricket career ==
As of the early 1890s Bradley was considered one of the best batsmen in Brisbane, characterized by patience, and a good wicket-keeper. He played for the Brisbane Graziers' Cricket Club and in December 1892 he was selected for a series between Graziers' and a Rockhampton XI. It was noted that Graziers' did not have a longstop in place during the series due to Bradley's skill as a wicket-keeper. Bradley captained Graziers' in the second match of the series.

Queensland was granted first-class status in the 1892-93 season, and in March 1893 a match between two Queensland sides was played to determine who would be selected for the state's inaugural first-class match. Bradley played in the match and took a catch and a stumping, and was observed to be one of the better batsmen. He was selected as wicket-keeper and captain of the first state side, which played New South Wales in Brisbane in April 1893. He scored a duck and 13 in the game, but did take a stumping and a catch and captained Queensland to victory by 14 runs.

In March 1894 Bradley was selected as Queensland's wicket-keeper in their second game, which was against NSW in Sydney, but not as captain, and took two stumpings and a catch, and in December 1894 he played for Queensland against the touring English Ashes team. In February 1895 NSW returned to Brisbane and Bradley took one catch and scored 44 and 21, and he also played in a second tour match against the English team. In December he continued his streak of representing Queensland in all its first-class games in a match against NSW in Sydney.

In the 1896-97 season Bradley was selected in a Queensland side which toured New Zealand, playing in five games from December 1896 to January 1897, and notably did not keep wicket for the first time in his first-class career. He returned to keeping in April 1897 in a game against NSW in Brisbane. In late 1897 a Brisbane electorate cricket competition was established and Bradley played for the Woolloongabba club in the new competition.

In February 1898 Bradley played against another English touring team for a combined Queensland and Victoria XI in Brisbane in a game which was drawn by agreement without the Australians batting. In January 1899 he returned to first-class captaincy leading Queensland in a match against South Australia in Brisbane, which Queensland lost by an innings and 284 runs, and he played his last first-class match in November against NSW in Brisbane, keeping wicket but not captaining.

In his professional career Bradley worked in the North Ipswich railway workshops in the sawmills department and in 1919 he participated in a cricket match between the sawmills department and the carriage and wagons workshop department.
