= Bob Joyce (cricketer) =

Australian cricketer (born 1947)

Personal information
- Born: 11 December 1947 (age 78); Auchenflower, Queensland, Australia
- Source: Cricinfo, 3 October 2020

Bob Joyce (born 11 December 1947) is an Australian cricketer. He played in sixteen first-class and four List A matches for Queensland between 1969 and 1973.

Joyce played for Sandgate-Redcliffe in Brisbane Grade Cricket debuting for the C grade side in the 1961-62 season and making the A grade side in the 1965-66 season. He became a successful allrounder topping the competition bowling averages in four seasons from 1968 to 1978 and the batting average in four seasons from 1970 to 1974. In 1969 he also became a member of the Sandgate-Redcliffe Club Executive Committee serving for many years and he was named captain of the club for the 1974-75 and 1977-78 seasons. In 1979 he was awarded life membership with the club having scored 4495 runs at an average of 30.17 and taking 279 wickets at an average of 20.30 in his club career.

In November 1968 Joyce was selected in the Queensland Colts side and in October 1969 he was selected in the Queensland First-class side and scored 86 not out on debut. He played for Queensland against the touring Pakistan Test team in a tour game in 1972 however he represented Queensland for the last time the following year.

== See also ==
- List of Queensland first-class cricketers
