= Kira Holmes =

Australian cricketer (born 2002)

Personal information
- Full name: Kira Jane Holmes
- Born: 8 November 2002 (age 24); Allora, Queensland, Australia
- Batting: Right-handed
- Role: Batter

Domestic team information
- Years: Team
- 2022/23–present: Queensland

Career statistics
Competition	WLA	WT20
Matches	3	4
Runs scored	11	4
Batting average	-	-
100s/50s	0/0	0/0
Top score	10	3*
Catches/stumpings	0/–	/
- Source: CricketArchive, 20 January 2023

Kira Jane Holmes (born 8 November 2002) is an Australian cricketer who currently plays for Queensland in the Women's National Cricket League (WNCL). She plays as a right-handed batter.

== Domestic cricket ==
Holmes plays grade cricket for Valley District Cricket Club. Before concentrating on cricket, Holmes was a competitive campdrafter and equestrian competitor.

In January 2019, Holmes played for Northern Territory Under-18s at the National Underage Championships, being part of the team's north Queensland cohort. Holmes was first selected in a squad for Queensland in December 2022, but made her debut for the side in January 2023, against Victoria in the Women's National Cricket League.
