= William Hayes (Australian cricketer) =

Australian cricketer

W. B. Hayes
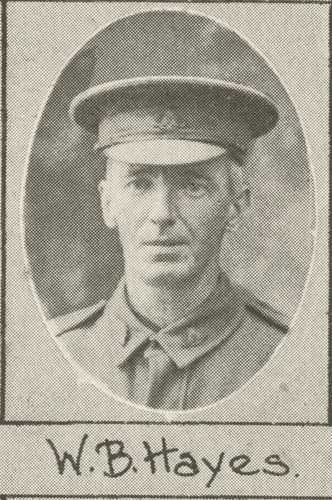

Personal information
- Full name: William Bede Hayes
- Born: 16 October 1883; Surry Hills, Sydney, New South Wales, Australia
- Died: 5 November 1926 (aged 43); Corinda, Queensland, Australia
- Batting: Right-handed
- Bowling: Legbreak, googly

Domestic team information
- Years: Team
- 1904/05–1911/12: Queensland
- Source: ESPNcricinfo, 1 June 2020

William Bede Hayes (16 October 1883 – 5 November 1926) was an Australian first-class cricketer. He played seventeen first-class matches for Queensland between 1904/05 and 1911/12. He played for South Brisbane in Queensland district cricket.

== Personal life ==
William was the son of Patrick Hayes, and the Hayes family was prominent in Brisbane for running the Criterion Hotel on Elizabeth Street.

In the First World War he served in the Australian Imperial Force Flying Corps, serving as a Private, Sapper, and Air Mechanic 2nd Class. He struggled financially after the war and received aid from the Queensland Cricket Association. He contracted tuberculosis during the war which gradually weakened him until causing his death in 1926 and he was survived by his wife and five children, the youngest of whom was only sixteen months old. The Queensland Cricket Association proposed to hold a memorial match to raise funds for the family after his death.

He is buried in Nudgee Catholic Cemetery.

== Cricket career ==
Hayes notably scored 500 runs and took 84 wickets for South Brisbane in the 1905/06 district season, the record allround season performance in Queensland cricket at the time, and his wicket tally was the highest in the competition for the season. As of 1908 he was vice-captain of South Brisbane, and he topped the wickets for the competition with the club again in 1908–09 with 83 wickets and 1912–13 with 53 wickets.
