= Len Balcam =

Australian cricketer

Personal information
- Full name: Leonard Frank Balcam
- Born: 20 August 1957 (age 69); Melbourne, Australia
- Batting: Right-handed
- Bowling: Left-arm fast-medium
- Role: Bowler

Domestic team information
- Years: Team
- 1978/79–1979/80: Queensland
- 1981/82–1983/84: Victoria

Career statistics
Competition	First-class	List A
Matches	12	8
Runs scored	100	18
Batting average	9.09	4.50
100s/50s	0/0	0/0
Top score	21	9
Balls bowled	1,939	450
Wickets	29	11
Bowling average	33.93	28.72
5 wickets in innings	0	1
10 wickets in match	0	0
Best bowling	3/35	5/49
Catches/stumpings	2/–	1/–
- Source: Cricinfo, 3 February 2021

Leonard Frank Balcam (born 20 August 1957) is an Australian former cricketer. He played five first-class cricket matches for Queensland between 1978 and 1980 and seven for Victoria between 1982 and 1984.

== Cricket career ==
Balcam began his cricket career in Victoria playing for the Footscray All Technical Schools cricket team in the early 1970s, and he later played for the Footscray Cricket Club in grade cricket alongside Merv Hughes and Tony Dodemaide.

He moved to Queensland at some point where he joined the South Brisbane District Cricket Club and he began playing for the Queensland First-class side in 1978. He was described as being part of Queensland's "new pace battery" as he debuted in the side at the same time as fellow pace bowler George Brabon.

He achieved notice for scoring "unexpected extra runs" as a tailend batsman in a match against Western Australia in his first season. In November 1978 he played for Queensland against the touring English team, and took 3 for 56 notably bowling David Gower, and had a short but notable performance with the bat being part of a partnership with John Maclean which scored 54 runs in just 47 minutes. In December 1978 he was criticized for "spraying the new ball" while trying to achieve extra pace in a match against Tasmania. Ahead of the 1979-80 season Balcam was dropped by Queensland, with fast bowler Carl Rackemann joining the side, although he did play one match in the season in which he took three wickets.

Balcam returned to Victoria after being dropped by Queensland and in 1982 made his debut for Victoria. He played against another touring England side in 1982, and also against a touring New Zealand side, dismissing Martin Crowe albeit after he had scored a century. He represented Victoria in their tour game against Sri Lanka in February 1983. He was dropped by Victoria in the 1983-84 season but recalled after Rod McCurdy was injured however it was his last season of first-class cricket. He remained a member of the Victorian squad until at least 1987.

Balcam coached the Williamstown Cricket Club for the 2004-05 season.

Outside of cricket, Balcam worked as a Telecom lineworker.

== State career statistics ==
Balcam was a regular in the Queensland First-class side for one season and despite performing well statistically, averaging well below 25.00 with the ball, he was dropped from the side the following season with the exception of being recalled for one isolated game. He did not play First-class cricket for two seasons but returned to state level cricket for Victoria for the 1982-83 season in which he performed well with the ball. He struggled the following season, averaging over 80, which was his final First-class season.

Balcam only played one List-A game for Queensland in which he took five for 49, his best figures at state level. He debuted for Victoria in List-A cricket before being selected in the first-class side but struggled in his three seasons for the team failing to average below 30.00 in any of them.
