= Lynwood Gill =

Australian cricketer

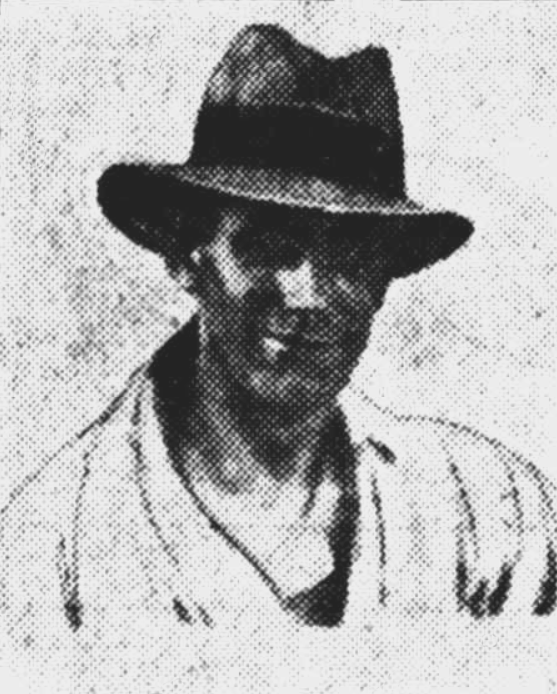

Personal information
- Born: 19 November 1891; Gretna, Tasmania, Australia
- Died: 4 December 1986 (aged 95); Pullenvale, Queensland, Australia

Domestic team information
- Years: Team
- 1911-1913: Tasmania
- 1926-1928: Queensland
- Source: Cricinfo, 20 January 2016

Lynwood Gill (19 November 1891 – 4 December 1986) was an Australian cricketer who was a batsman and was praised for having a "fine range of shots" and having a style which was able to popularize the game. He played three first-class matches for Tasmania between 1911 and 1913 and seven matches for Queensland between 1926 and 1928.

== Cricket career ==
Gill played for South Brisbane in district cricket during his playing career, serving as their captain, and he was made a life member of the club in 1927. He worked in cricket administration after his playing career and was Treasurer of the Queensland Cricket Association as of 1937.

== See also ==
- List of Tasmanian representative cricketers
