= Hemantha Devapriya =

Sri Lankan cricketer

Personal information
- Born: 12 April 1958 (age 68); Galle, Sri Lanka
- Batting: Right-handed
- Role: Wicket-keeper

Career statistics
Competition	First-class	List A
Matches	70	15
Runs scored	1761	254
Batting average	19.14	21.16
100s/50s	0/10	0/1
Top score	95	78
Catches/stumpings	144/17	7/3
- Source: Cricinfo, 12 February 2023

Hettiwatte Hemantha Devapriya (born 12 April 1958) is a former cricketer who played first-class cricket for Sri Lanka. In September 2018, he was one of 49 former Sri Lankan cricketers honoured by Sri Lanka Cricket for their services before the country became a full member of the International Cricket Council (ICC).

== Early life ==
He was educated at CMS Sri Jayawardenapura College and Nalanda College Colombo and played cricket for the Nalanda college first XI team from 1976 to 79.

After leaving school, Hemantha played cricket for Colts Cricket Club in Colombo. His first-class appearances were for Sri Lanka Under-25s (1980/81), Sri Lankans (1981 in England), Arosa Sri Lanka (1982/83), Colts Cricket Club (1988/89 to 1995/96) and Southern Province (1992). The rebel tour to South Africa from October–December 1982 scuppered any aspirations of official international recognition.

== Playing career ==
The wicket-keeper batsman made his debut against Australia in 1980 with an explosive 80 in Galle and went on to score several top-notch half centuries against England during the 1981 tour. Devapriya has scored 1,761 first-class runs in a short career of 70 matches.

== Coaching career ==
In 2016, Sri Lanka Cricket announced that him as head coach of the Sri Lanka women's national cricket team. He replaced another former Sri Lanka wicket-keeper/batsman Lanka de Silvawho held the post since July 2015. He resigned from the role in June 2018, citing personal reasons. He was replaced by Harsha de Silva as the head coach of the Sri Lankan women's cricket team.

Devapriya holds level III qualifications from the ECB and is a Level II Certified Coach in Sri Lanka.. His coaching career spans over 15 years where he was the head coach of the Colombo Cricket Club, the NCC, the Fingara Cricket Academy and most recently Bloomfield C & AC.
