= Ryan Broad =

Australian cricketer (born 1982)

Personal information
- Full name: Ryan Andrew Broad
- Born: 9 March 1982 (age 44); Brisbane, Queensland, Australia
- Batting: Right-handed
- Bowling: Right-arm medium
- Role: Batsman
- Relatives: Wayne Broad (father)

Domestic team information
- Years: Team
- 2005/06–2011/12: Queensland

Career statistics
Competition	First-class	List A
Matches	57	29
Runs scored	3,208	666
Batting average	32.73	23.78
100s/50s	8/13	0/5
Top score	135	92
Balls bowled	134	–
Wickets	2	–
Bowling average	39.00	–
5 wickets in innings	0	–
10 wickets in match	0	–
Best bowling	1/5	–
Catches/stumpings	35/–	35/–
- Source: Cricinfo, 7 January 2012

Ryan Andrew Broad (born 9 March 1982) is an Australian professional cricketer who played for the Queensland cricket team. He is a right-handed opening batsman. Broad was educated at the Anglican Church Grammar School.

Broad is the son of Wayne Broad, who played for Queensland between 1977 and 1983. He was first selected to represent Queensland in November 2005 in a four-day match against Victoria (he scored 23 and 3 in each innings). He took the field for the Australian national team as a substitute fieldsman during the 2006–07 Ashes series, where he caught Andrew Strauss. In November 2011, he reached his highest score in first class cricket, hitting 135 in the second innings of a Sheffield Shield match against Western Australia.

Broad last played for Queensland in the 2011/12 season and he retired from Queensland Premier Cricket, where he had been captaining Wynnum Manly, after the 2015/16 season. He had passed his father to achieve the record amount of runs scored by anyone to bat for Wynnum Manly in his last season.
