= Easts-Redlands District Cricket Club =

Redlands
- Nickname: Tigers
- League: Queensland Premier Cricket

Personnel
- Captain: (Australia) Simon Milenko
- Coach: (Australia) Mark Rasmussen

Team information
- Colours
- Founded: 1897
- Home ground: Peter Burge Oval
- Capacity: 5,000

History
- Grade wins: 13
- 1-Day wins: 2
- T20 wins: 0
- Official website: redlandscricket.com.au

The Redlands District Cricket Club, nicknamed 'The Tigers' is a cricket club in Redlands, Queensland, Australia. They play in the Queensland Premier Cricket competition.

== History ==
In 1897 the club was established as the Woolloongabba Cricket Club. In August 1925 a change of name to Eastern Suburbs was considered, and by September the club was playing as Eastern Suburbs.

The club began negotiations with Redlands Cricket in 1993 for a possible club relocation to the Redlands home ground. In 1995 the club changed its name to East-Redlands, following its merger with Redlands Cricket.

== List of first-class players ==
Below is a partial list of East-Redlands players who have played first-class cricket.

- William Bradley
- Edward Crouch
- Lance Druery
- William Hoare
- Alex Kemp
- Simon Milenko
- Greg Moller
- Marnus Labuschagne
- Jimmy Peirson
- James Bazley
- Sam Heazlett

== See also ==
- Cricket in Queensland
