= Sydney Donahoo =

Australian cricketer

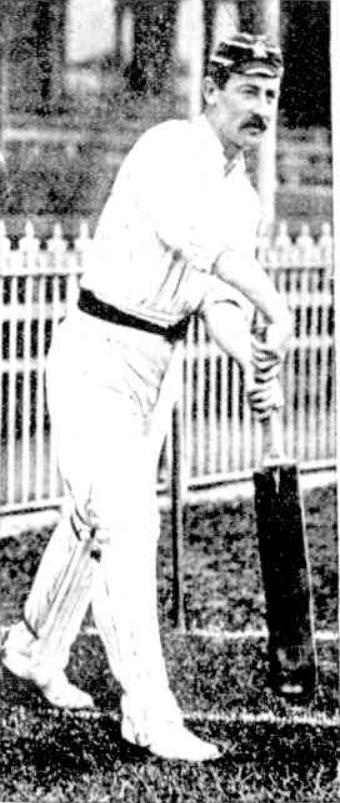

Personal information
- Full name: Sydney John Donahoo
- Born: 14 April 1871; Melbourne, Australia
- Died: 14 January 1946 (aged 74); Melbourne, Australia

Domestic team information
- Years: Team
- 1890-96: Victoria
- 1896–97: Queensland
- Source: Cricinfo, 26 July 2015

Sydney John Donahoo (14 April 1871 – 14 January 1946) was an Australian cricketer. He played five first-class cricket matches for Victoria between 1890 and 1896, six for Queensland in 1896–97 and one for a combined Victoria and Queensland side.

Donahoo was a nephew of John Conway who was a round-arm fast bowler and managed the first Australian cricket team to tour England in 1878. He attended Wesley College and was a successful sportsman becoming the captain of the schools cricket team and football team and he was described as the "greatest schoolboy batsman Victoria has had." He was also successful in athletics although he was unable to continue in athletics after suffering a serious football accident.

Donahoo debuted in district cricket for the St. Kilda First XI when he was sixteen and at eighteen he debuted for Victoria in First-class cricket. He was still captaining the Wesley College cricket team when he made his debut for Victoria making him among the few people to play First-class cricket while still playing school cricket.

After completing his education Donahoo moved to Brisbane, Queensland, to work for an insurance office. He was selected to represent Queensland in First-class cricket and in 1896-97 he toured New Zealand with the Queensland side. In 1897 the Brisbane district cricket competition was established and Donahoo played for South Brisbane and topped the run aggregate for the inaugural 1897–98 season with 299 runs.

After his cricket career Donahoo returned to Victoria, being hospitalized in Melbourne in 1914, and he died in St. Kilda in 1946 after a lengthy illness.

== See also ==
- List of Victoria first-class cricketers
