= Lance Druery =

Australian cricketer (1927–1993)

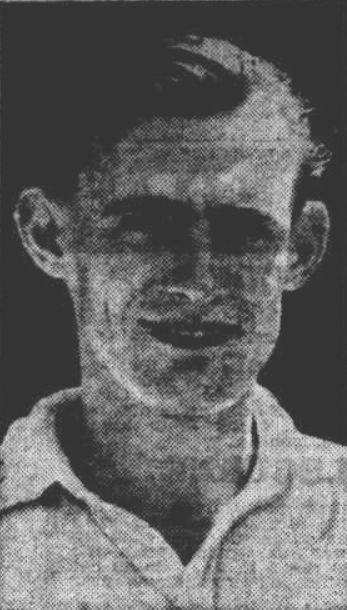

Personal information
- Born: 14 May 1927; Townsville, Queensland, Australia
- Died: 10 August 1993 (aged 66); Carina, Queensland, Australia
- Source: Cricinfo, 3 October 2020

William Lance Druery (14 May 1927 – 10 August 1993) was an Australian cricketer. He played in two first-class matches for Queensland in 1949/50.

== Cricket career ==
Druery was a slow bowling all-rounder who played country cricket for Mackay and in October 1949 he was selected to represent a Mackay Colts team which played an Eton side. In November he was selected in the Queensland Colts side due to a successful match with Mackay played in Brisbane, however prior to his first match for the Colts the Mackay Cricket Association received a request for Druery to be sent to Brisbane early to play in a special match for the State selectors.

Druery was selected for Queensland in January 1950 for a First-class match against South Australia in Brisbane. He was the first Mackay cricketer to represent the state and he said after playing that it was a wonderful experience, and noted the fielding was of a higher standard than in Mackay with there being intense concentration on every ball. He bowled well in his debut game and was reselected to play against Victoria in Brisbane in February 1950. He dropped Herb Turner while fielding at third slip in the game which resulted in the match turning against Queensland, and another notable event for him during the match was when he faced several bouncers which resulted in the crowd heckling the Victorians.

By January 1951, Druery had moved to Brisbane where he was playing for Easts in grade cricket, and in August 1951 he was selected in a Queensland practice squad, however he did not represent the State again.

== See also ==
- List of Queensland first-class cricketers
