= Edward Crouch (cricketer) =

Australian cricketer

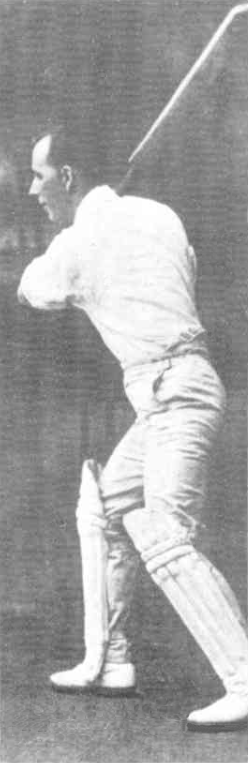

Personal information
- Full name: Edward Robert Crouch
- Born: 11 January 1873; Holborn, London, England
- Died: 8 August 1962 (aged 89); South Brisbane, Queensland, Australia
- Source: Cricinfo, 5 June 2020

Edward Robert Crouch (11 January 1873 – 8 August 1962) was an Australian cricketer. He played seventeen first-class matches for Queensland between 1892–93 and 1909-10.

In August 1897 he convened a meeting to form the Woolloongabba Cricket Club when the Queensland first grade cricket competition was formed, and he became the Club's first secretary and captain. His son, Peter, played for Eastern Suburbs in the 1940s.

== See also ==
- List of Queensland first-class cricketers
