= Ray Phillips (cricketer) =

Australian cricketer

Cricket information
- Batting: Right-handed

Domestic team information
- Years: Team
- 1978/79: New South Wales
- 1979/80-1985/86: Queensland

Career statistics
Competition	First-class	List A
Matches	89	21
Runs scored	2,925	129
Batting average	28.96	16.12
100s/50s	1/21	0/0
Top score	111*	19
Catches/stumpings	271/15	26/0
- Source: CricInfo, 11 February 2024

Raymond Berry Phillips (born 23 May 1954) is an Australian cricketer who was born and raised in New South Wales and originally represented that state, but moved to Queensland in 1979 and played for that state for many years. He was selected for the 1985 Ashes squad but did not appear in any of the Test matches on the tour.

== Career ==
Phillips made his club debut in 1971 aged 15. He toured Sri Lanka in 1971 with the Australian Schoolboys and played for NSW Colts for three years. His first job after school was working for Bert Oldfield.

=== First Class Cricketer ===
Phillips played three games for NSW but Steve Rixon was blocking his path so he moved to Queensland in 1979.

Phillips scored his debut first class century in 1981–82.

After Marsh retired in 1984, Phillips was considered a candidate for the keeping position for the tour of the West Indies. However the selectors preferred Roger Woolley, who had a better batting record, with Wayne Phillips as a backup. When Woolley was injured the selectors went for Wayne Phillips.

Wayne Phillips impressed enough on the tour to be kept as Australian keeper for the 1984–85 summer. When he was injured, selectors relied on Steve Rixon. Rixon and Wayne Phillips were selected as the keepers on the 1985 Ashes tour. Rixon had to drop out when it was revealed he had signed to tour South Africa and Ray Phillips was selected in his place.

In the 1984–85 Sheffield Shield final, Phillips scored 53 and 47 in Queensland's one wicket loss.

=== Ashes Tourist ===
Ray Phillips was the reserve keeper on the tour and did not play in any test matches. He played 7 first class games taking 13 catches with a top score of 39, against Worcestershire, where he took part in a 96 run stand with Allan Border.

=== Later career ===
Wayne Phillips' keeping declined over the 1985–86 summer and there were some calls to replace him with Ray Phillips. However, when Wayne was dropped as keeper in 1986, the selectors went for Tim Zoehrer.

Phillips' last first glass game was the 1985–86 Sheffield Shield final, which Queensland lost.

Ray Phillips retired from all forms of cricket in August 1986. He was replaced as Queensland's wicketkeeper by Peter Anderson.

=== Post cricket career ===
Phillips commentated cricket matches for ABC radio. He was also a selector for the Queensland cricket team. Phillips gained notoriety on social media site Reddit after commentating on a Cricket Australia live stream where he proceeded to complain about aspects of cricket and life in general including players performing hand shakes and high fives, players taking unscheduled drinks breaks, toasters, and his views that the Australian Broadcasting Corporation had become too one-sided.

== Personal life ==
Phillips is Jewish.
