= Ipswich Logan Cricket Club =

Ipswich Logan
- Nickname: Hornets
- League: Queensland Premier Cricket

Personnel
- Captain: (Australia) Anthony Wilson
- Coach: (Australia) Aaron Moore

Team information
- Colours
- Founded: 2012
- Home ground: Ivor Marsden Complex, Amberley, Queensland.
- Capacity: 5,000
- Official website: Ipswich Logan Hornets

The Ipswich Logan Cricket Club is a cricket club located in Ipswich, Queensland, Australia. They play in the Queensland Premier Cricket competition, fielding teams in 1st and 2nd grade. They were founded when the Beenleigh Logan Cutters moved to Ipswich in 2012.

== See also ==
- Cricket in Queensland
