= Beenleigh Logan Cutters =

Australian cricket club

Personnel
- Captain: (Australia) TBA
- Coach: (Australia) TBA

Team information
- Colors
- Founded: 1960
- Home ground: Digital8 Oval, Tansey Park

Beenleigh Logan Cutters District Cricket Club is a cricket club in Beenleigh, Queensland, and City of Logan, Australia. They are also known as the Cutters and play in the Brisbane Grade Cricket competition. They were founded in 1960. For the start of the 2012/2013 season the Beeleigh Logan Cutters moved to Ipswich and became the Ipswich Logan Hornets.

== See also ==
- Cricket in Queensland
