= Ernest Toovey =

Australian cricketer

Ern Toovey
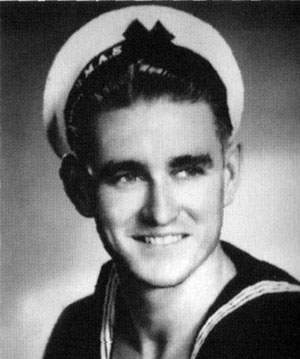

Personal information
- Full name: Ernest Albert Toovey
- Born: 16 May 1922; Warwick, Queensland, Australia
- Died: 18 July 2012 (aged 90); Mitchelton, Queensland, Australia
- Batting: Left-handed
- Bowling: Slow left-arm orthodox

Domestic team information
- Years: Team
- 1949/50–1955/56: Queensland

Career statistics
Competition	First-class
Matches	37
Runs scored	1,346
Batting average	24.03
100s/50s	–/9
Top score	87
Balls bowled	49
Wickets	0
Bowling average	–
5 wickets in innings	–
10 wickets in match	–
Best bowling	–
Catches/stumpings	5/–
- Source: Cricinfo, 30 July 2015

Ernest Albert Toovey MBE, OAM (16 May 1922 – 18 July 2012) was an Australian cricketer and baseball player. In cricket, Toovey was a left-handed batsman who bowled slow left-arm orthodox. He was born at Warwick, Queensland.

Toovey served in the Royal Australian Navy during World War II, enlisting for service when he was seventeen. He served during the war aboard HMAS Perth, where he was present during the Battle of the Java Sea and was also aboard the ship during its sinking at the Battle of Sunda Strait in February 1942. Half of the ship's crew were lost, while the remainder who survived, including Ordinary seaman Toovey, were captured by the Japanese and spent the remainder of the war in Prisoner of War camps. While imprisoned, he reportedly resisted recommendations to have his leg amputated because of an ulcer, telling his captors "You can't take my leg off because I've got to play cricket for Queensland." His time as a prisoner saw Toovey put to work as part of the forced labour constructing the Thai-Burma Railway.

Following the end of the war and his release from Japanese captivity, Toovey stuck by his wartime aim of playing cricket for Queensland by making his first-class debut for the state against South Australia in the 1949–50 Sheffield Shield. He made 36 further first-class appearances for Queensland, the last of which came against New South Wales in the 1955–56 Sheffield Shield. In his 37 first-class appearances for Queensland, he scored 1,346 runs at an average of 24.03, with a high score of 87. One of nine half centuries he made, this score came against Victoria in the 1950–51 Sheffield Shield. Following his playing career for Queensland, he served as a selector for the Queensland side, as well as serving on the Queensland panel as chairman for nearly 25 years, before retiring in 1989. He was also the President of Northern Suburbs District Cricket Club.

Outside of cricket, he played baseball for Queensland and Australia, having first played baseball as a prisoner of war in a match between Australia POWs and American POWs, which was organised by the Japanese commandant. He was also prominent in ex-services organisations, holding executive positions in Returned and Services League of Australia and Australian Prisoners of War Association, for which he received the MBE and OAM. He died at Mitchelton, Queensland, on 18 July 2012. His funeral was held at St Brigids Catholic Church, Red Hill, Queensland, on 24 July.
