= Tasman Long =

Australian cricketer

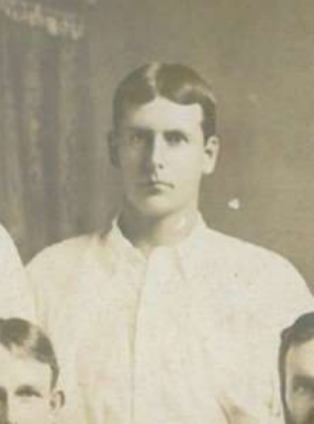

Personal information
- Born: 11 September 1875
- Died: 20 October 1926 (aged 51); Brisbane, Queensland, Australia
- Source: Cricinfo, 5 October 2020

Thomas Tasman Thompson Long (11 September 1875 – 20 October 1926) was an Australian cricketer. He played in four first-class matches for Queensland between 1896 and 1905. In his career he was licensee of the Oriental Hotel and Long's Hotel. In his personal life he attended Brisbane Grammar School, had four children, and was brother of Alderman R.W.H. Long.

== See also ==
- List of Queensland first-class cricketers
