= Ross Chapman =

Australian cricketer (born 1952)

Personal information
- Born: 22 October 1952 (age 74); New Lambton, New South Wales, Australia
- Source: ESPNcricinfo, 24 December 2016

Ross Chapman (born 22 October 1952) is an Australian cricketer. He played one first-class match for New South Wales in 1972/73. He was educated at North Sydney Boys High School and played grade cricket for North Sydney District Cricket Club. He became a Boarding House Master at The Kings School Parramatta and later Brisbane Grammar School. He was the Team Psychologist for the Australian Cricket Team.

== See also ==
- List of New South Wales representative cricketers
