= Greg Moller =

Australian cricketer (born 1983)

Personal information
- Born: 29 January 1983 (age 43); Boonah, Queensland, Australia
- Batting: Right-handed

Domestic team information
- Years: Team
- 2006/07–2014/15: Queensland

Career statistics
Competition	First-class	List A
Matches	21	12
Runs scored	922	214
Batting average	24.26	17.83
100s/50s	1/3	0/1
Top score	120	50
Catches/stumpings	11/0	4/0
- Source: CricInfo, 29 October 2017

Greg Moller (born 29 January 1983) is an Australian cricketer who has played 21 first-class matches and 12 List A matches.

== Cricket career ==
Moller began his cricket career in Boonah playing as an opening bat and wicketkeeper for Fassifern Under-11's and later moved to the Beaudesert competition. He represented the Queensland junior Under-17's and Under-19's sides and in 1999 he was awarded the Ken Mackay Trophy for Queensland Junior Cricketer of the Year. When he was seventeen Moller began playing for Beenleigh-Logan in Brisbane Grade Cricket although he moved to East-Redlands after a short time.

In 2007 he scored 120 and 97 for the Queensland Academy of Sport against the ACT which impressed selectors, and he was selected for Queensland in the 2006/07 First-class season, debuting in February 2007, and played three matches for the State scoring 117 runs at an average of 23.40 without passing 50. He suffered several knee and hamstring related injuries early in his State career, requiring knee surgery in early 2007, and in February 2007 he was struck in the helmet while fielding at short leg, and early in 2008 he missed a game due to a concussion. His performances earned him selection for a Cricket Australia Chairman's XI which played a Sri Lankan side early in the 2007/08 season and in March 2008 he received a scholarship for the Australian Institute of Sport men's program at the Centre of Excellence. In the 2007/08 Pura Cup he scored two 50's and averaged 32.16 in four games.

Moller struggled in the 2008/09 season for Queensland due to injuries, scoring just 78 runs at 13.00 in his three First-class games without passing 50, and scoring 48 runs at 12.00 in the Ford Ranger Cup List A tournament, and he was dropped from the State teams. He had knee surgery again in the off-season and started the 2009/10 season playing for the Queensland Academy of Sport and East-Redlands in Grade cricket hoping to gain reselection and he was also selected in the Australia squad for the Hong Kong Sixes Tournament in late October. He only played one First-class game for Queensland in the 2009/10 season, when injuries to openers Nick Kruger and Ryan Broad left a vacancy, and scored 15 runs across both innings. His Queensland contract was not renewed for the 2010/11 season.

Moller moved to the Gold Coast Dolphins for the 2011/12 Brisbane Grade cricket season, and in 2012/13 he won the Senior Player of the Season for the club as he scored 977 grade runs at an average of 81.41. He was recalled to the Queensland State team in the 2012/13 season and played in five First-class matches scoring 277 runs at 27.70 and scoring his only First-class century, and he also played three List-A games scoring 79 runs at 26.33.

He was awarded a State contract by Queensland again for the 2013/14 season, however a knee injury cut his season short and he only played three First-class games scoring 111 runs at 22.20 without a 50, and five List-A games scoring 87 runs at 17.40 with one 50. His Queensland contract was not renewed for the 2014/15 season, however he was recalled to the First-class team during the season after he scored 233* off 266 balls for East-Redlands and State player Ben McDermott was injured and he played two games scoring 117 at 29.25 with one 50.

Moller was working as a batting coach at Gregory Terrace as of 2014, and he was still playing for East-Redlands as of 2016. For the 2019/20 season Moller was assisting with coaching at Grade training sessions for East-Redlands.
