= Charles Barstow =

Australia cricketer

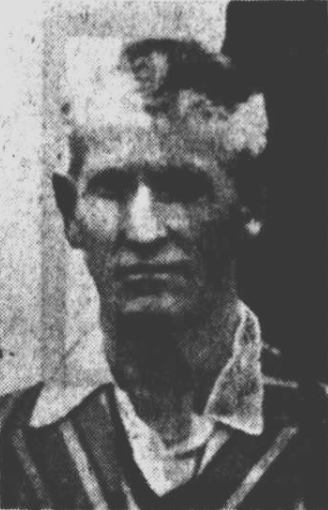

Personal information
- Full name: Charles Banks Barstow
- Born: 14 March 1883; Brisbane, Queensland, Australia
- Died: 12 July 1935 (aged 52); Eagle Junction, Queensland, Australia
- Batting: Right-handed
- Bowling: Right-arm medium; Right-arm legbreak

Domestic team information
- Years: Team
- 1906/07-1925/26: Queensland

Career statistics
Competition	First-class
Matches	22
Runs scored	187
Batting average	6.44
100s/50s	0/0
Top score	43*
Balls bowled	3,708
Wickets	78
Bowling average	28.08
5 wickets in innings	5
10 wickets in match	2
Best bowling	8/51
Catches/stumpings	10/-
- Source: Cricinfo, 1 June 2020

Charles Banks Barstow (14 March 1883 – 12 July 1935) was an Australian cricketer. He played twenty-two first-class matches for Queensland between 1906/07 and 1925/26. He played district cricket from 1901 to 1930 representing Etons, South Brisbane, North Brisbane, and Toombul, and was involved with Wanderers Cricket Club after retiring.

== Personal life ==
Barstow was born and educated in Brisbane. He began his professional career working for Robertson and Co. booksellers and stationers, and later established C. B. Barstow and Co. at Tonk's Buildings on Elizabeth Street and worked as a wholesale merchant.

He was a strong Methodist regularly attending the Wooloowin Methodist Church and his wife donated four stained glass windows to the Church in 1937 in his memory.

Barstow died in 1935 after a short battle with pneumonia.

== Cricket career ==
Barstow bowled medium pace, but turned the ball considerably towards leg. He was notable for his 'floater' delivery where he released the ball from the back of the hand causing it to drop sharply and pick up pace off the wicket. He was regarded by some as Australia's best bowler on rain-affected wickets during his career. He was regarded as a poor batsman.

In his club career he played for Etons from 1901 to 1905, South Brisbane from 1905 until moving to North Brisbane in 1910, returned to South Brisbane for one season in 1912, and then played for Toombul from 1913 to 1930. Notable district seasons for him early in his career were 1906/07 when he took 86 wickets for South Brisbane and won the Premiership with them and 1907/08 when he took 61 wickets for South Brisbane when they became back-to-back Premiers, topping the competition aggregate for wickets in both seasons. He spent most of his career at Toombul and in total he took 655 wickets at 10.89 for the club. Seasons in which he topped the district competition for wickets with Toombul were 1913/14 with 101, 1914/15 with 87, 1920/21 with 75, 1923/24 with 63, 1925/26 with 44, and 1927/28 with 43. He took ten wickets in an innings twice in club cricket, taking 10 for 34 for South Brisbane in 1909, and 10 for 16 for Toombul in 1921.

He worked in cricket administration for the Queensland Wanderers Club for two years before his death.
