= Gil Hardcastle =

Australian cricketer

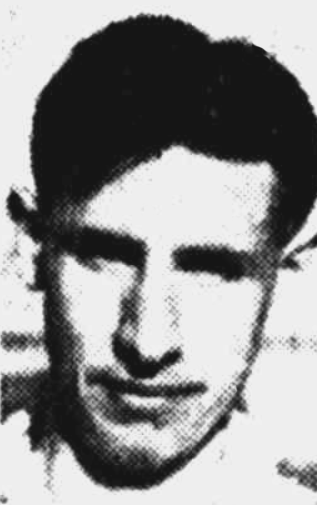

Personal information
- Born: 26 February 1910; Brisbane, Queensland, Australia
- Died: 14 February 2000 (aged 89); Currimundi, Queensland, Australia
- Source: CricInfo, 3 October 2020

Gil Hardcastle (26 February 1910 – 14 February 2000) was an Australian cricketer. He played in one first-class match for Queensland in 1935/36.
