= Alan Marshal (cricketer) =

Australian cricketer

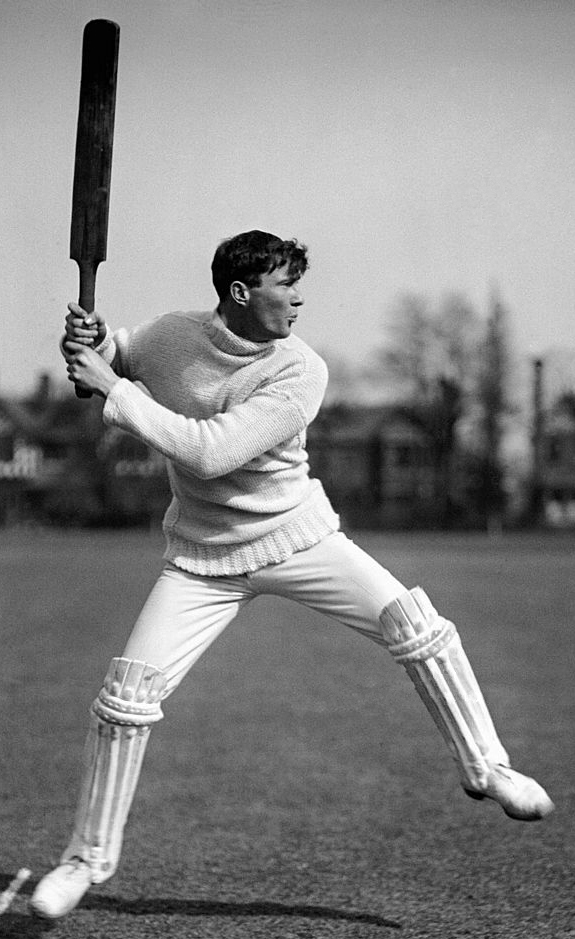

Personal information
- Full name: Alan Marshal
- Born: 12 June 1883; Warwick, Queensland, Australia
- Died: 23 July 1915 (aged 32); Imtarfa Military Hospital, Malta
- Height: 6 ft 3 in (1.91 m)
- Batting: Right-handed
- Bowling: Right-arm fast-medium
- Role: Batting all-rounder

Domestic team information
- Years: Team
- 1903/04–1913/14: Queensland
- 1907–1910: Surrey
- First-class debut: 2 April 1904 Queensland v New South Wales
- Last First-class: 19 December 1913 Queensland v New Zealand

Career statistics
Competition	First-class
Matches	119
Runs scored	5177
Batting average	27.98
100s/50s	8/31
Top score	176
Balls bowled	5355
Wickets	119
Bowling average	22.84
5 wickets in innings	7
10 wickets in match	1
Best bowling	7/41
Catches/stumpings	114/0
- Source: CricketArchive, 13 October 2011

Alan Marshal (12 June 1883 – 23 July 1915) was a cricketer who played first-class cricket for Queensland and for Surrey County Cricket Club. Marshal was a hard-hitting middle-order batsman and a fast-medium bowler who got some spin off the pitch. He was 6 ft 3 ins in height.

== Biography ==
Marshal was educated and played cricket for South Brisbane State School and Brisbane Grammar School, later progressing to club cricket, playing for South Brisbane and with Paddington in Sydney. Marshal had played just eleven games for Queensland – at that time not part of the Sheffield Shield competition – when he arrived in England in 1905. He proceeded to make more than 2,700 runs in club cricket, principally for W. G. Grace's London County Cricket Club, and also played a few first-class matches for amateur teams. In 1906, he did even better: in all cricket, he scored more than 4,300 runs in the season. Qualified by residence to play Championship cricket for Surrey in 1907, he passed 1,000 runs at a respectable average of almost 25 runs per innings.

But in 1908 his career took off: he scored 1,931 runs at an average of more than 40 runs per innings, and his clean hitting – he was particularly strong at driving – made him the sensation of the county cricket season. He was duly named as a Wisden Cricketer of the Year in 1909.

Marshal was unable to repeat the success of 1908, however. He scored 1,000 runs again for Surrey in 1909, but at a much reduced average. He was suspended for some games by the club committee following an incident when Surrey were playing Derbyshire at Chesterfield. The committee did not publicly give the reason for their decision but, according to Jack Hobbs' autobiography published in 1935, Marshal and some teammates had been heading and kicking a ball about in the street on their way to their hotel. A police constable asked Marshal for his name. However he refused to give it, so was taken to the police station. The case was sent to the Chief Constable, but he dismissed it and it did not reach court. Hobbs himself was not in Chesterfield, as he was playing for England at the time.

After a handful of games at the start of the 1910 season, Marshal's contract was ended. He returned to Australia, where he again appeared in occasional matches for Queensland, but with limited success.

His first-class figures were: 119 matches, 198 innings, 13 n.o., 5,177 runs, highest score 176, with an average of 27.98; 114 catches. Bowling: 119 wickets for 2,718 runs, at an average of 22.84. His best bowling was 7 for 41.

In World War I, he was one of the Australian troops sent to Gallipoli, where he caught enteric fever. He was evacuated to Malta, but died there. Alan Marshal was a great-uncle of actor Alan Marshal (1909–1961).
