= Peter Anderson (cricketer, born 1961) =

Australian cricketer

Personal information
- Full name: Peter William Anderson
- Born: 2 May 1961 (age 65); South Brisbane, Queensland
- Batting: Right-handed
- Role: Wicket-keeper

Domestic team information
- Years: Team
- 1986/87–1992/93: Queensland
- 1988/89: South Australia

Career statistics
Competition	First-class	List A
Matches	56	13
Runs scored	1399	97
Batting average	17.93	32.33
100s/50s	0/6	0/2
Top score	63	13.85
Balls bowled	24	–
Wickets	0	–
Bowling average	–	–
5 wickets in innings	–	–
10 wickets in match	–	–
Best bowling	–	–
Catches/stumpings	156/15	15/2
- Source: Cricinfo, 29 August 2015

Peter William Anderson (born 22 May 1961, South Brisbane, Queensland) is a former Australian first-class cricketer, representing Queensland and South Australia. He was right-handed wicket-keeper batsman.

== Domestic career ==
Anderson played 56 first-class matches from 1986 to 1994, in which he scored 1399 runs at an average of 17.93, with six half-centuries. He also took 157 catches and had stumped 15 batsmen. He played 13 List A matches over a seven-year period in which he scored just 97 runs at an average of 13.85. His unbeaten 63 was the alone 50-plus score. He also took 15 catches and has 2 stumpings to his name.

Anderson was Queensland's wicketkeeper from 1986. He injured his thumb during the 1987–88 summer and was replaced by Ian Healy. Soon after, Healy was selected as Australia's first choice wicketkeeper.

Anderson later moved to South Australia.

In 2003 Darren Berry said Anderson was "possibly the best gloveman in this country during the past 20 years":

I take nothing away from Ian Healy, whose keeping to Shane Warne during the 1993 and '97 Ashes series may never be equalled, but let me tell you, Peter Anderson was a freak. During my time at the cricket academy in 1988, Ando was keeping wicket for South Australia in his tatty old white hat. He was touted as the successor to Australian keeper Greg Dyer but broke a thumb standing up to the stumps to Ian Botham's bowling during a shield game at the WACA Ground in 1987–88. As is often the case with wicketkeeping, opportunities at the highest level are rare. Just ask Richie Robinson, who sat in Rod Marsh's shadow for 15 years, or Bob Taylor, who was second-fiddle to the great Allan Knott for 20 years. Healy grabbed the chalice and the rest, as they say, is history. Ando was devastated. He left his native Queensland and moved to SA to start afresh. It was while watching him closely that I believe I developed my philosophy on the art of keeping wickets.

== Coaching career ==
Anderson has coached local clubs in Queensland over the last six years and was working with wicket-keepers in the ICC Pacific region. He was named to succeed fellow Australian Brad Hogg as head coach of the Papua New Guinea national cricket team in February 2012. His first assignment was the 2012 ICC World Twenty20 Qualifier.

In March 2014, Anderson was appointed head of Afghanistan's National Cricket Academy in Kabul.
