= Peter Clifford (cricketer) =

Australian cricketer

Personal information
- Born: 4 November 1959 (age 67); Bellingen, New South Wales, Australia
- Batting: Right-handed

Domestic team information
- Years: Team
- 1983/84–198/86: New South Wales
- 1986/87–1990/91: New South Wales

Career statistics
Competition	First-class	List A
Matches	48	24
Runs scored	2864	588
Batting average	38.70	26.72
100s/50s	6/14	0/6
Top score	152*	73
Balls bowled	72	-
Wickets	0	-
Bowling average	-	-
5 wickets in innings	-
10 wickets in match	-	-
Best bowling	-	-
Catches/stumpings	36/–	7/–
- Source: , 15 September 2026

Peter Stanley Clifford (born 4 November 1959, in Bellingen, New South Wales) was an Australian first-class cricketer who played for the New South Wales Blues and the Queensland Bulls later on in his career. A right-handed batsman, he played between 1983 and 1991. His best season came in 1984/85 when he made 919 runs in his 12 matches at an average of 51.

== Career ==
Clifford played grade cricket for Randwick and captained the Australian Under-19 side. He was picked for NSW in 1982-83 but was made 12th man.

Clifford made his first class debut in 1983–84 after performing well in trial games. He scored 74 in his first game and made 152 against Victoria in his second game. He scored 443 first class runs at 88.60 during his debut season. He was also part of a Randwick side that won the grade premiership.

NSW coach Bob Simpson said Clifford's "second season in the Shield will really test him - the first season is perhaps a little easier because the bowlers don't know the batsmen." Clifford agreed saying, "I still haven't struck the big guns yet," he said, referring to the top opening bowlers in Australia. "I think you get away with a lot more in your first season but towards the end it was a lot harder to score quick runs... I'm really worried about getting into the Shield side. I just want to consolidate my spot. It's taken a while to get into it and I would do anything to stay here. 1 don't mind batting anywhere from opener to number six and I bat the same way regardless of where I come in."

Clifford had a superb 1984–85 season, scoring 919 runs, including a crucial knock of 83 in the Sheffield Shield final, helping NSW draw the game and win the competition. He was discussed as an international prospect. He was offered a scholarship to play in England in 1985.

He struggled more over the 1985–86 season, making 396 runs at 30.46. However he was selected on the Australian Under 25 tour of Zimbabwe.

He had a poor 1986–87 season, making 120 runs at 24.

He returned to first class cricket in 1988–89, scoring 271 runs at 30.11. He was better the following season, scoring 432 runs at 36.

In this last season of first class cricket, 1990–91, he scored 183 runs at 22.

== See also ==
- List of New South Wales representative cricketers
