= Roy Levy =

Australian cricketer

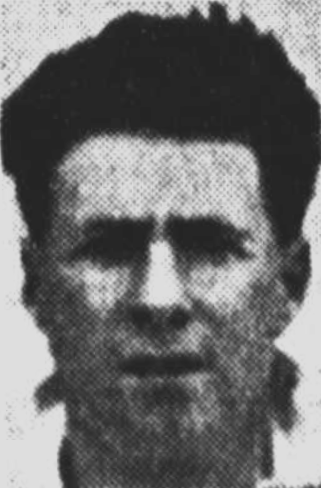

Personal information
- Full name: Roy Mark Levy
- Born: 20 April 1906; Sydney, New South Wales, Australia
- Died: 12 December 1965 (aged 59); Clayfield, Queensland, Australia
- Batting: Left-handed
- Bowling: Right-arm medium
- Role: All-rounder

Domestic team information
- Years: Team
- 1928/29–1935/36: Queensland

Career statistics
Competition	FC
Matches	25
Runs scored	1,510
Batting average	33.55
100s/50s	3/7
Top score	148
Balls bowled	972
Wickets	13
Bowling average	54.69
5 wickets in innings	0
10 wickets in match	0
Best bowling	3/44
Catches/stumpings	27/–
- Source: CricketArchive, 23 August 2009

Roy Mark Levy (20 April 1906 – 12 December 1965) was an Australian cricketer and baseballer who represented the Australian baseball team in 1936. He also played for Queensland in the Sheffield Shield for eight seasons, captaining them 11 times in his 25 appearances.

== Playing career ==
In cricket, Levy was a prolific left-handed batsman who was a right-handed medium pace bowler; in baseball, he was a right-handed pitcher who also played shortstop. He played with the Waverley cricket and baseball clubs under coach and ex-international player Alan Kippax. Levyassisted Waverley to dominate the Sydney Baseball Premiership winning the competition from 1924 through to 1928 and represented New South Wales through these years. Through his success in baseball he became the first player to be offered a scholarship to play and study in the US. Although he declined this offer so he could continue his studies on insurance in Australia.

In 1928, Levy's insurance company moved him to an office in Brisbane where he went to play his sport with Valley. He dominated the competition as a pitcher and the following year he played with Eastern Suburbs alongside Gunnah Mollah where they dominated the competition until Mollah switched to Valley in 1930 as to even up the competition. During his time playing baseball in Queensland, he got selected in the Queensland cricket team in 1929 and made his debut against Victoria scoring 129 and playing as a wicket-keeper.

In 1932, Levy along with Roger Hartigan, persuaded Jack Hutcheon, president of Queensland Cricket, to call a meeting at Brisbane YMCA Hall for men interested in playing baseball and produced great interest among cricketers in the winter off-season. Levy was instrumental in the resurgence of baseball both in this era and after World War II. He was president of the organisation from 1936 to 1938 and was a player coach of the state team from 1933 to 1938 and again in 1954. Levy continued to have success over the next seven years of state cricket, including matches against a touring Marylebone Cricket Club averaging over 40 and was seriously considered for Australian selection, but was refused to travel inter-state with the Queensland team by his insurance company, effectively preventing him from participating in the 1939 Claxton Shield, the first Queensland participated in.

After retiring from professional cricket, he went on to coach Queensland in interstate games, as well as a friendly series against the Tokyo Giants in 1954. Levy died in 1965 and was buried in Brisbane's Toowong Cemetery. He was of Jewish extraction, and has been called the "first notable Jewish cricketer" in Australia.
