= Sandgate-Redcliffe District Cricket Club =

Cricket club in Queensland, Australia

Sandgate-Redcliffe
- Nickname: The Gators
- League: Queensland Premier Cricket

Personnel
- Captain: Mitch Swepson (Men's) Steve Cawood (Men's) Meagan Dixon (Women's)
- Coach: Justin Sternes (Men's Coach) Ben Vikionkorpi (Men's Coach) TBA (Women's Coach) TBA (Women's Assistant Coach)

Team information
- Colours
- Founded: 1961
- Home ground: Trevor Hohns Oval (Deagon Recreation Reserve)
- Capacity: 5,000

History
- 2-Day (Men's 1st Grade) wins: 5
- 1-Day (Men's 1st Grade) wins: 6
- T20 (Men's 1st Grade) wins: 3
- T20 (Women's 1st Grade) wins: 3
- 1-Day (Women's 1st Grade) wins: 4
- Official website: Sandgate-Redcliffe District Cricket Club

The Sandgate-Redcliffe District Cricket Club is a cricket club in Sandgate and Redcliffe, Queensland, Australia. They play in the Queensland Premier Cricket competition. They were founded in 1961.

The Gators are most known for their three-peat of two-day premierships in the 1997/98, 1998/99 and 1999/00 seasons. This period of two-day cricket dominance continued at the start of the new millennium with a further two premierships coming in 2001/02 and 2003/04.

Sandgate created Queensland Premier Cricket history by becoming the first Men's First Grade team to win three successive Twenty20 titles in 2015-2016 season, 2016-17 season and 2017-2018 season.

Since 2018, the Gators have faced challenges in maintaining consistent success, but have still secured several premierships. These include the Women’s First Grade T20 Max premiership in the 2023/2024 season, the Third Grade One-Day premiership in the 2022/2023 season, and back-to-back C1 Warehouse premierships in the 2023/2024 and 2024/2025 seasons. These achievements have played an important role in developing the club’s players, particularly its emerging young talent.

In recent seasons, the Gators have emerged as leading contenders in underage competitions. This success includes an Under-19 premiership in the 2024/2025 season, led by captain Kane Neilsen, as well as the Lord Taverners Under-17 Championship in the 2025/2026 season.

In 2026, Sandgate-Redcliffe junior Steven Hogan was selected in Australia’s Under-19 squad for the ICC Men’s Under-19 World Cup. Hogan has drawn comparisons with Australian Ricky Ponting. Batting at number three in Australia’s opening match of the tournament, Hogan scored 115 from 111 deliveries, recording the first century of the competition. He is also recognised as one of Queensland’s most promising emerging players, a reputation reinforced by his 2025/2026 season in which he amassed 475 runs at an average of 67.86, including one century and four half-centuries, despite missing a significant portion of the season due to international commitments.

== See also ==
- Cricket in Queensland
