= Western Suburbs District Cricket Club (Queensland) =

- Nickname: Bulldogs
- League: Queensland Premier Cricket

Personnel
- Captain: (Australia) Patrick Collins
- Coach: (Scotland) Peter Steindl

Team information
- Colours
- Founded: 1921
- Home ground: Graceville Memorial Park
- Capacity: 8000

History
- Grade wins: 14
- 1-Day wins: 3
- T20 wins: 0
- Official website: westsdcc.cricket

Western Suburbs District Cricket Club is a cricket club in Graceville, Brisbane, Australia. They play in the Queensland Premier Cricket competition. They were founded in 1921.

== See also ==
- Cricket in Queensland
