= Wynnum Manly District Cricket Club =

Wynnum Manly
- Nickname: Sea Eagles
- League: Queensland Premier Cricket

Personnel
- Captain: (Australia) Male: Jed Wilson Female: Clodagh Ryall
- Coach: (Australia) Male: Wes Aspeling Female: Sam Curtis

Team information
- Colors: Green and gold (ex. maroon)
- Founded: 1961
- Home ground: Carmichael Park, Tingalpa
- Capacity: 500

History
- Grade wins: 5
- 1-Day wins: 5
- T20 wins: 1

The Wynnum Manly District Cricket Club is an Australian cricket club representing the Brisbane coastal suburbs of Wynnum and Manly. The club has teams in the Brisbane Grade Cricket, Queensland Sub-Districts and Warehouse Cricket competitions.

They were founded in 1961 with over 850 current playing members. Wynnum also has a junior club that competes in the EDJCA (Eastern Districts Junior Cricket Association) and BEARs (Bayside, Easts and Redlands Junior Cricket Association).

In Season 2026/27 Wynnum Manly District Cricket Club (WMDCC) will enter its 66th season. It has become one of the best cricket clubs in Brisbane at all playing levels for male, female, and junior cricket and claimed the Queensland Premier Cricket Club Championship in Season 2025/26 winning Women's T20MAX, Men's Third Grade (both two day and one day competitions), Men's Fifth Grade (two day competition), and Men's Sixth Grade (both two day and one day competitions) in what was the best season the club has had in many years.

2025/26 Club Executive

President - Graham Mapri

Vice-President - Brett Perrett

Secretary - Jason Bragger

Treasurer - Gian Tavianni

Junior President - Tony Green

Club Operations Manager - Dale Hansen

Wynnum Manly District Cricket Club is the Senior grade cricket club encapsulating the following: -

Eastern District Junior Cricket Association (EDJCA)

Wynnum Juniors, Holland Park, Carina, Bulimba, Mansfield, and Villanova.

WMDCC also has ties with:

> Mansfield Lions

> APNA

and affiliations with:

Action Indoor Sports Wynnum (Wynnum Seagulls Indoor Cricket)

Warehouse Cricket.

== List of First-class cricketers ==
Below is a current list (as of end of Season 2023/24) of WMDCC's representative players:

Australian Male Test Representatives

G.J.Cosier 1977-78

G.M.Ritchie 1982-83

C.G.Rackemann 1982-83

J.N.Maguire 1983-84

A.C.Dale 1996-97

Australian One Day Male Representatives

G.J.Cosier 1978

J.N.Maguire 1983

C.G.Rackemann 1983

G.M.Ritchie 1982

A.C.Dale 1997

S.G.Law 1998

B.Laughlin 2009

Australian Male T20 Representatives

B.Laughlin 2009

Australian Female Representatives

J.C.Price 1995-96

S.A.Cooper 2000-01

Queensland Bulls Sheffield Shield Male Representatives

K.E.Dudgeon 1967-69

W.D.Albury 1970-74

D.J.Allen 1974-75

D.C.Schuller 1976-79

G.J.Cosier 1977-78

W.R.Broad 1977-83

J.N.Maguire 1978-79, 82-84

J.C.Bell 1978-79

C.G.Rackemann 1979-84

I.D.C.Kelly 1980-81

G.M.Ritchie 1980-84

M.A.Gaskell 1982-83

I.N.Gallagher 1982-83

P.E.Cantrell 1988-91

M.V.Tooley 1989-90

S.A.Prestwidge 1991-92

A.C.Dale 1996-02

S.G.Law 1997-04

S.J.O'Leary 2000-01

C.P.Simpson 2003-11

R.A.Broad 2005-12

B.Laughlin 2007-11

J.S.Floros 2010-11

A.C.McDermott 2010-11

B.R.McDermott 2014-15

P.R.George 2014-15

L.Guthrie 2022-current

Queensland Bulls One Day Representatives

K.E.Dudgeon1970-74

W.D.Albury 1971-74

G.J.Cosier 1975-81

J.N.Maguire 1979-91

J.C.Bell 1979-80

C.G.Rackemann 1979-95

W.R.Broad 1981-87

G.M.Ritchie 1981-92

I.N.Gallagher 1983

P.E.Cantrell 1989-91

S.G.Law 1989-04

M.V.Tooley 1991-93

S.A.Prestwidge 1992-01

A.C.Dale 1996-01

S.J.O'Leary 2001

C.P.Simpson 2004-11

R.A.Broad 2006-12

B.Laughlin 2009-11

A.C.McDermott 2010-13

J.S.Floros 2011-16

B.R.McDermott 2014-15

P.R.George 2015-16

L.Guthrie 2022-current

Big Bash T20 Male Representatives (All Franchises)

C.P.Simpson

R.A.Broad

B.Laughlin

A.C.McDermott

J.S.Floros

L.Guthrie

Queensland Female Representatives

J.C.Price 1995-96

A.L.Farrell 1999-00

S.A.Cooper 2000-01

M.L.White 2000-01

H.E.Thompson 2001-01

T.E.Brown 2003-04

R.G.Browne 2003-04

L.M.Daley 2007-08

D.Holden 2007-08

Z.Cooke 2023-24

L.Harris 2025-26

G.Collins 2025-26

Women's Big Bash T20 Representatives

E.Johnstone 2023

== See also ==
- Cricket in Queensland
