= Valley District Cricket Club =

- League: Queensland Premier Cricket

Personnel
- Captain: (Australia) Hugh Weibgen
- Coach: (Australia) Andrew Gode

Team information
- Colours
- Founded: 1897
- Home ground: Ashgrove Sports Ground
- Official website: http://valleycricket.org.au

Valley District Cricket Club is a cricket club playing in the Queensland Premier Cricket competition, the leading club cricket competition in Queensland, Australia. The club was established on 16 August 1897 and is one of only four remaining foundation clubs in Queensland.

Valleys when founded was located in the inner Brisbane suburb of Fortitude Valley now resides at Ashgrove Sportsground Park.

Valleys is the largest cricket club in Australia in player numbers and is believed to be one of the biggest clubs in the world; boasting 1,400 junior players & 250 senior players.

Australian Test cricketers to play for Valleys include Matthew Hayden, Allan Border, Don Tallon, Kepler Wessels, Usman Khawaja, Stuart Law and England wicket-keeper Geraint Jones OBE.

Current contracted Queensland Bulls players are Usman Khawaja, Hugh Weibgen, Mark Steketee, Max Bryant, Callum Vidler, Jack Wildermuth & Tom Straker along with Queensland Fire players Jessica Jonassen, Sianna Ginger & Kira Holmes

Notable Queenslanders to play for Valley include Lee O'Connor, Roy Levy, Otto Nothling, Malcolm Francke, Joe Dawes, Geoff Foley, Lee Carseldine & Luke Feldman.

== Success ==
Valley is one of Brisbane's most successful cricket clubs in both senior and junior competitions. They have recently won the following:

First Grade Premiers	94/95, 96/97, 13/14
First Grade One-Day Premiers	95/96, 96/97, 00/01, 18/19
First Grade T20 Premiers	12/13, 13/14, 19/20, 24/25
Second Grade Premiers	03/04, 23/24
Third Grade Premiers	01/02, 03/04, 05/06, 07/08
Fourth Grade Premiers	98/99, 00/01, 01/02, 03/04, 04/ 05, 05/06, 06/07, 14/15, 15/16, 17/18
Fifth Grade Premiers	03/04, 09/10, 14/15, 16/17, 17/18
Sixth Grade Premiers	92/93, 12/13, 13/14, 14/15, 15/16, 17/18, 18/19
Lords Taverners Premiers	99/00
Women's First Grade Premiers	94/95, 95/96, 96/97, 21/22, 23/24
Club Champions	96/97, 00/01, 01/02, 02/03, 23/24

== See also ==
- Cricket in Queensland
