= Toombul District Cricket Club =

- Nickname(s): The 'Buls, The Faithful
- League: Queensland Premier Cricket – Queensland Cricket Association

Personnel
- Coach: Andrew Pilgrim

Team information
- Colours: Claret and Blue
- Founded: 1882
- Home ground: Oxenham Park (The Yard) – comprising Ken Mackay Oval & La Frantz Oval
- Capacity: 28,500

History
- Grade wins: 21
- 1-Day wins: 2
- T20 wins: 0
- Official website: https://toombulcc.com

Toombul District Cricket Club is an Australian cricket club based in Nundah, Queensland, in the city of Brisbane.

== Overview ==
The Toombul District Cricket Club (Toombul DCC or simply TDCC) is a Queensland Cricket Association cricket club which competes in the Queensland Premier Cricket competition, the top level of cricket played in Queensland.

The Queensland Premier Cricket competition has grade levels from Premier Grade to Sixth Grade, with Toombul fielding teams across six senior grades, as well as an U/16 Lords Taverners side. Toombul also has a comprehensive junior club, Toombul DCC – Juniors which fields age-group sides from under 6's to under 16's, and a Milo in2Cricket programme.

Toombul is equal with Souths as the most successful cricket club in Queensland, having secured 21 Premier Grade premierships in its history, the most recent coming in the 2012/13 season.

== History ==
Toombul is one of the oldest sporting clubs in Australia, with records dating the club back to 1882. In 1897/98, Toombul was one of the foundation clubs of what has continued to be the highest level of club cricket played in Queensland, the Queensland Premier Cricket competition.

Toombul has been a breeding ground for Test and First Class representatives over the years, and those from Toombul form a who's who of famous cricketing names (including four of Bradman's 1948 Invincibles).

Toombul's 1948 Invincibles

- Don Tallon
- Bill Brown
- Colin McCool
- Lindsay Hassett

Toombul's Bill Brown also has the distinct honour of being the first and only native Queenslander to captain the Australian cricket team.

Other famous Toombul players include:

- Tim Murtagh
- Ron Oxenham
- Ken Mackay
- Percy Hornibrook
- Jeff Thomson
- Wally Grout
- Harry Frei
- Peter Clifford
- Ryan Harris
- Cameron Boyce
- Luke Pomersbach
- Chris Lynn
- Matthew Renshaw

Toombul's Premier Grade Club Record Partnerships contains a "who's who" of famous Toombul names from the post-WWII era. Included are a number of Test and First-Class representatives.

- 1st wicket 284 runs SM Milini & KD Murphy v Valley DCC 2009/10
- 2nd wicket 430 runs KD Mackay & AH Carrigan v South Brisbane 1948/49
- 3rd wicket 293 runs KD Mackay & JD Bratchford v South Brisbane 1954/55
- 4th wicket 336 runs PS Clifford & V Snijders v Colts 1986/87
- 5th wicket 205 runs MT Renshaw & CJ Sabburg v Sunshine Coast 2014/15
- 6th wicket 231 runs PWG White & RH McDonald V Sandgate-Redcliffe 2017/18
- 7th wicket 232 runs MM Raadschelders & G Fitness v Gold Coast 2010/11
- 8th wicket 150 runs CJ Boyce & JG Tibbits v Sandgate-Redcliffe 2013/14
- 9th wicket 151 runs SE Carlson & JG Tibbits v Western Suburbs 2011/12
- 10th wicket 106 runs SB Williams & RW McGhee v Wynnum Manly 1991/92

Toombul's 2018/19 season Premier Grade squad includes:

- Australian Test opening batsman Matt Renshaw
- Queensland Bulls, Brisbane Heat, and Australian One-Day batsman Chris Lynn
- Queensland Bulls bowler Ronan McDonald.

In 1972, two Toombul men – Errold La Frantz and Cec Anstey – were instrumental in the formation of the junior cricket competition in north Brisbane, the Brisbane North Junior Cricket Association.

Queensland Cricket's longest serving official scorer, Judy Harris, is a Toombul DCC life member and began scoring Toombul matches in 1971. From 1986 she served as Queensland Cricket's official scorer, until retiring the pencil in 2014, after scoring over 500 First Class matches including 31 Tests and 63 One-Day Internationals. Upon retirement, a room in the Toombul clubhouse was named The Judy Harris Room in honour of her services to the club.

== Ground ==
The Toombul playing ground is named Oxenham Park, after Toombul club legend Ron Oxenham. The facility incorporates two fields, the main field Ken Mackay Oval, and the second field La Frantz Oval, named after two more club legends, Ken Mackay and Errold La Frantz, respectively.

For much of the late 20th century, Nundah was a low socio-economic area, with public housing and vagrants abundant. Due to the difficulty Toombul Cricket Club faced in maintaining the facilities in the face of vandalism, and the homeless setting up camp at the groundsman's shed, Toombul became affectionately known as The Junkyard. Around the middle of the first decade of the 21st century, gentrification began to take hold in Nundah, as the wealth from the suburbs directly to its south began to flow northwards. This resulted in a much improved suburb, and Toombul was able to improve the club facilities significantly. While the moniker "Junkyard" is no longer applicable, the players and supporters have retained part of the old label, referring to Toombul simply as The Yard.

The record attendance for a match at Oxenham Park was on 4 November in the 1931/32 season, when 26,438 people attended to watch Toombul's Second Grade side attempt to bat out a draw and retain 7th spot on the ladder, which they did, much to the delight of the masses of spectators. Unfortunately the fantastic result caused ecstatic jubilation, and eventually utter chaos in the large crowd, which began looting the local shops, and in amongst the mayhem the grandstand, pavilion, and an orphanage near the ground were set alight and burnt down. There was also an unconfirmed report of a fist-fight between several members of the Country Women's Association and the Sisters of Mercy outside the nearby Royal English Hotel.

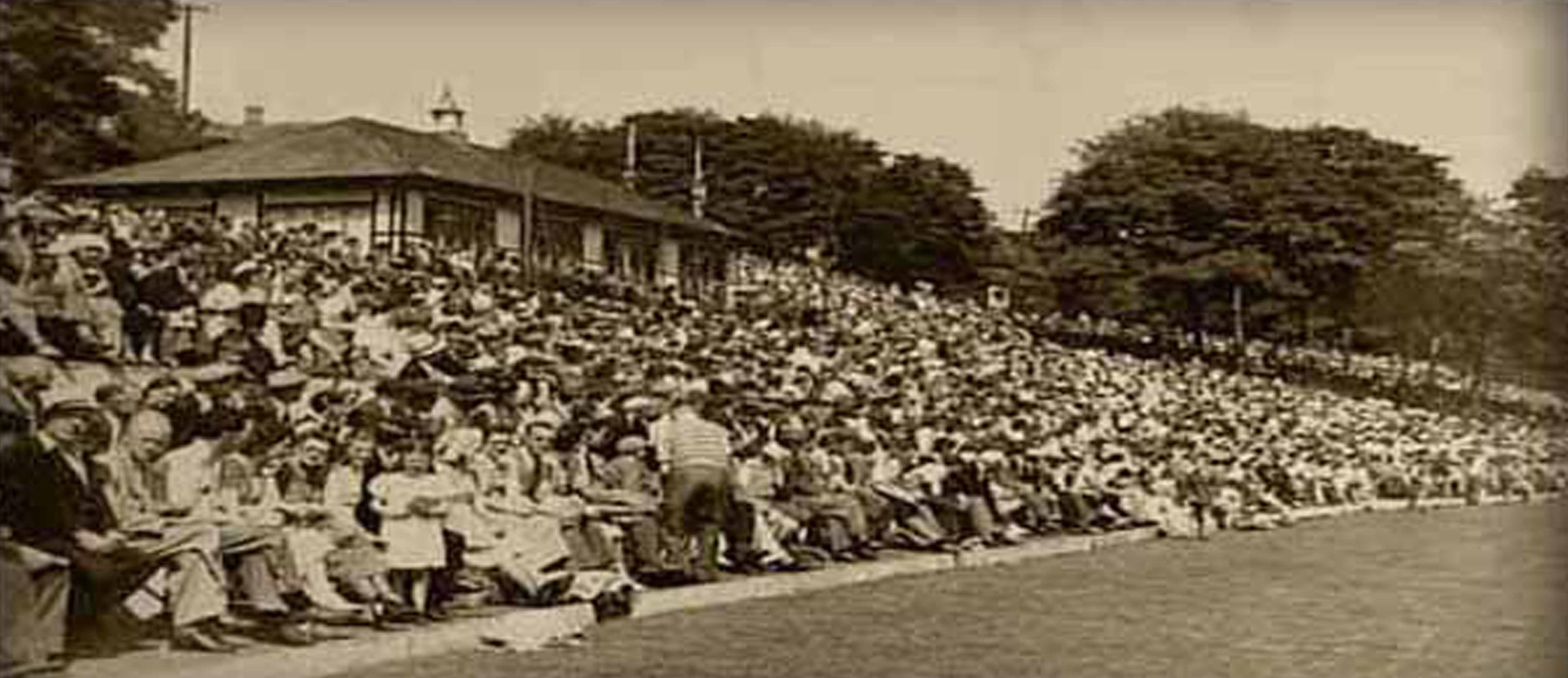
The only known photograph of the record attendance at Oxenham Park in 1931/32

== Facilities ==
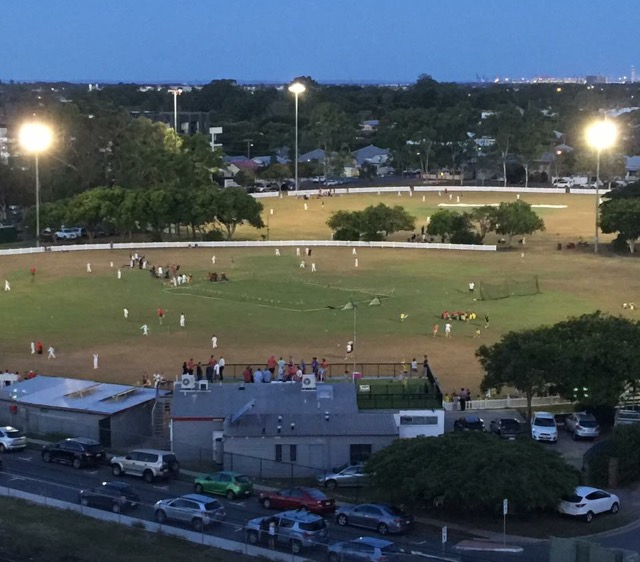
Toombul District Cricket Club, with LaFrantz Oval in the background, Ken Mackay Oval in the foreground, and The Yard Bar rooftop overlooking the field

The Toombul clubhouse underwent a capital works programme to develop the rooftop into a rooftop beer garden. Work commenced on 21 January 2017 and were completed on 15 February 2017. The works included new balustrading, stairs, and astroturf flooring. The rooftop is open to the public as well as Toombul club members. The club has The Yard Bar rooftop beer garden, canteen, bar facilities, air-conditioned clubrooms, as well as plenty of street parking. The rooftop is available for booking through the club directly.

== See also ==
- Cricket in Queensland
