= Queensland Premier Cricket =

- Administrator: Queensland Cricket
- Format: 2 Day, 1 Day & T20
- First edition: 1897/98
- Tournament format: Home & Away
- Number of teams: 12
- Current champion: Western Suburbs
- Most successful: South Brisbane (21); Toombul (21)

Queensland Premier Cricket is the top cricket competition played in Queensland, Australia. The competition was founded under the name Brisbane Electoral Cricket in 1897 and eventually came to be known as Brisbane Grade Cricket, but has since expanded to take in teams from Gold Coast, Sunshine Coast, and Ipswich.

As of the 2019/20 season there were six grades in the Two-Day Bulls Masters competition. In addition to the two-day Grade competition there is also a One-Day competition for the John McKnoulty Cup and a T20 competition for the Tom Veivers Trophy. There is also a women's One-Day competition for the Katherine Raymont Shield contested by eight sides as of the 2020/21 season, and a women's T20 competition under Queensland Premier Cricket.

Easts-Redlands are the reigning First Grade premiers, and Gold Coast are the reigning premiers in both the One Day and T20 competitions.

== History ==
=== Early years: 1897 – 1915 ===
The 1894–95 Queensland senior cricket season resulted in great dissatisfaction among cricketers and the public due to poor management of fixtures because more prominent clubs would monopolise cricket grounds and not allow smaller clubs to play regularly throughout the season. As a result of this dissatisfaction in July 1895 a Queensland Cricket Association (Q.C.A.) meeting was held at which it was proposed that electorate cricket be established, which would mean disbanding the various clubs playing senior cricket in Queensland and replacing them with clubs organised by players residing within electorates. The proposal was greeted with enthusiasm, as club cricket was seen as old fashioned, with electorate cricket being a superior way of fostering rivalry and generating local interest in the sport, although an obstacle was securing cricket grounds in each electorate to accommodate a club.

In April 1897 the National Cricket Union held a committee to submit proposals for an electorate cricket competition to be established in Brisbane in collaboration with the Q.C.A. for the 1897–98 season. In May the Q.C.A. held a meeting to formally discuss an electorate competition and appoint a committee to determine electorate boundaries and residential qualifications, and after discussion the decision to form an electoral competition was carried unanimously. In July 1897 the Q.C.A. decided to amalgamate with the National Cricket Union and rescinded its constitution, by-laws, and other rules and regulations, drafting new ones in keeping with electoral cricket with amendments suggests by the National body, and began planning a campaign to form the electorate clubs. In August the National Cricket Union pulled out of the amalgamation at the last minute, however the Q.C.A. pushed on forming subcommittees for each electorate to pursue forming clubs.

In October 1897 the inaugural Brisbane electorate cricket season began with the following clubs competing: North Brisbane, South Brisbane, Fortitude Valley, Toombul, Toowong, and Woolloongabba. Enoggera also formed a side but were unable to participate in the first season as they formed after fixtures had been scheduled, but the Queensland Cricket Association scheduled non-competition matches for the club to play. The season was regarded as disappointing, with the standard of cricket being poor and attendance being low, although a large amount of rain affected games was cited as a potential reason for low engagement.

In the 1898/99 season a Nundah club joined the competition and a Grammar School side began competing in the B Grade competition. Enoggera was unable to join the competition in 1898/99 but did finally compete in the 1899/1900 season, and in the 1900/01 season a Bundamba club joined the competition. By the 1901/02 season the Enoggera Club had become a general sports club and did not compete in the competition, and Nundah had merged with Toombul.

In 1913 the Queensland Cricket Association reconstituted the competition redrawing the electorate club boundaries to accommodate the following clubs: North Brisbane, South Brisbane, Woolloongabba, Toowong, Valley, Toombul, Nundah, and University. In 1915 the Q.C.A. suspended the competition due to the First World War, although in what would have been the 1916–17 season the Association secretary did schedule a handful of friendly matches between sides.

=== Recent events ===
Due to the COVID-19 pandemic the competition was suspended in 2020 however in September 2020 it became the first Australian state cricket competition to begin the 2020/21 season under Cricket Australia's Return to Play guidelines, which stipulated that the ball must be cleaned with a disinfectant wipe every forty minutes, that saliva could not be used to shine the ball, and that umpires could not hold bowlers hats during overs.

=== Women's cricket: 1997 to present ===
The Queensland Women's Premier Grade One-Day competition for the Katherine Raymont Shield was first held in the 1997/98 season. A women's second-grade One-Day competition for the Jodie Fields Shield was established in 2001/02 and a T20 competition was established in 2009/10. Clubs with women's first-grade sides competing as of 2017 were Western Suburbs, University of Queensland, Valley, Gold Coast, and Sandgate-Redcliffe.

Queensland women's cricket has expanded in recent years with Ipswich-Logan joining the first-grade competition in 2018/19, Wynnum-Manly and Redlands joining with a combined side in 2019/20, Sunshine Coast joining in 2020/21, and South Brisbane aiming to field a women's side to join in the 2022/23 season as of 2021.

== Current teams ==
Colours	Club	First season	Last season	Grade Titles	One-Day Titles	T20 Titles
	Easts-Redlands District	1897/98	Present	13	2	0
	Gold Coast District	1990/91	Present	2	4	4
	Ipswich District	2012/13	Present	0	0	0
	Northern Suburbs District	1927/28	Present	8	6	1
	Sandgate-Redcliffe District	1961/62	Present	5	3	3
	South Brisbane District	1897/98	Present	21	4	0
	Sunshine Coast District	1994/95	Present	1	1	0
	Toombul District	1897/98	Present	21	2	0
	University of Queensland	1912/13	Present	14	14	6
	Valley District	1897/98	Present	11	6	3
	Western Suburbs District	1921/22	Present	15	3	0
	Wynnum Manly District	1961/62	Present	5	5	1

== Defunct teams ==
Colours	Club	First season	Last season	Grade Titles	One-Day Titles	T20 Titles
	Beenleigh Logan Electorate	1994/95	2011/12	0	0	0
	Bundamba Electorate	1900/01	????	0	0	0
	Colts Electorate	????	????	4	0	0
	Enoggera Electorate	1899/1900	1900/01	0	0	0
	North Brisbane Electorate	1897/98	????	2	0	0
	Nundah Electorate	1898/99	1901/02	0	0	0
	Toowong Electorate	1897/98	????	1	0	0

== Records ==
=== Batting records ===
==== Highest score ====
Score	Player	Team	Season
345	Matt Renshaw	Toombul	2018/19
311*	Wade Townsend	Toombul	2009/10
302	Ryan Le Loux	Redlands	2007/08
300*	Matthew Goggin	Sandgate-Redcliffe	2002/03
285*	Peter Clifford	Toombul	1986/87
259	Chris Lynn	Toombul	2015/16
258*	Charles Morgan	Valley	1904/05
243	Roy Levy	Valley	1934/35
241	Ryan Broad	Wynnum-Manly	2005/06
Source: . Last updated: 2021.

==== Most runs in a season ====
Runs	Player	Team	Season
1116	Sam Truloff	Western Suburbs	2021/22
1069	Cecil Thompson	South Brisbane	1922/23
943	Aub Carrigan	Northern Suburbs	1944/45
918	Aaron Nye	Western Suburbs	2002/03
911	Jack Hutcheon	Toowong	1908/09
903	Nick Kruger	Valley	2005/06
882	Dom Michael	Northern Suburbs	2012/13
875	Roger Hartigan	Woolloongabba	1905/06
873	Ken Mackay	Toombul	1948/49
Source: . Last updated: 2021.

==== Highest season average ====
Average	Runs	Player	Team	Season
279.66	839	Cecil Thompson	South Brisbane	1925/26
203.00	812	Robbie MacDonald	Fortitude Valley	1898/99
145.50	873	Ken Mackay	Toombul	1948/49
137.25	549	Cecil Thompson	South Brisbane	1926/27
125.00	502	Chris Hartley	University	2011/12
119.50	239	Don Tallon	South Brisbane	1945/46
112.33	337	Ron Oxenham	Toombul	1927/28
108.14	757	Sam Trimble	Western Suburbs	1961/62
Source: . Last updated: 2021.

=== Bowling records ===
==== Best bowling ====
Bowling	Player	Team	Season
10/13	Sandy Morgan	University	1967/68
10/14	Gil Hardcastle	Toombul	1934/35
10/16	Charles Barstow	Toombul	1920/21
10/18	Joe Dawes	Valley	1998/99
10/26	D. Little	University	1964/65
10/27	F. Speare	Western Suburbs	1963/64
10/30	Charles Barstow	South Brisbane	1909/10
10/32	Ron Oxenham	Toombul	1929/30
Source: . Last updated: 2021.

==== Most wickets in a season ====
Wickets	Player	Team	Season
107	Chilla Christ	Western Suburbs	1942/43
101	Charles Barstow	Toombul-Windsor	1913/14
100	Michael McCaffrey	Western Suburbs	1904/05
87	Charles Barstow	Toombul-Windsor	1914/15
86	Charles Barstow	Toombul-Windsor	1906/07
86	Percy Hornibrook	Toombul	1922/23
86	J. Lincoln	Eastern Suburbs	1943/44
84	William Hayes	South Brisbane	1905/06
Source: . Last updated: 2021.

==== Best season bowling average ====
Average	Wickets	Player	Team	Season
5.29	54	Thomas Byrne	Woolloongabba	1898/99
5.81	73	John McLaren	Fortitude Valley	1910/11
5.95	46	Ron Oxenham	Toombul	1934/35
6.10	39	Charles Barstow	South Brisbane	1912/13
6.50	??	John McLaren	Fortitude Valley	1918/19
6.68	54	Ron Oxenham	Toombul	1929/30
6.69	52	Ron Oxenham	Toombul	1924/25
7.00	25	James Cockburn	Colts	1936/37
Source: . Last updated: 2021.

== Premierships ==
Season	First Grade	One-Day	T20
1897/98	Woolloongabba	–	–
1898/99	North Brisbane	–	–
1899/1900	Woolloongabba	–	–
1900/01	South Brisbane	–	–
1901/02	Fortitude Valley	–	–
1902/03	Toowong	–	–
1903/04	South Brisbane	–	–
1904/05	Toombul	–	–
1905/06	Woolloongabba	–	–
1906/07	South Brisbane	–	–
1907/08	South Brisbane	–	–
1908/09	South Brisbane	–	–
1909/10	South Brisbane	–	–
1910/11	Woolloongabba	–	–
1911/12	Toombul-Windsor	–	–
1912/13	South Brisbane	–	–
1913/14	Toombul-Windsor	–	–
1914/15	Fortitude Valley	–	–
1915/16	–	–	–
1916/17	–	–	–
1917/18	–	–	–
1918/19	Fortitude Valley	–	–
1919/20	Fortitude Valley	–	–
1920/21	Toombul-Windsor	–	–
1921/22	Toombul	–	–
1922/23	Toombul	–	–
1923/24	Wests	–	–
1924/25	Toombul	–	–
1925/26	Toombul	–	–
1926/27	Toombul	–	–
1927/28	Toombul	–	–
1928/29	Fortitude Valley	–	–
1929/30	Toombul	–	–
1930/31	Fortitude Valley	–	–
1931/32	Wests	–	–
1932/33	Toombul	–	–
1933/34	Norths	–	–
1934/35	Toombul	–	–
1935/36	South Brisbane	–	–
1936/37	Wests	–	–
1937/38	Colts	–	–
1938/39	Easts	–	–
1939/40	South Brisbane	–	–
1940/41	University	–	–
1941/42	Toombul	–	–
1942/43	Wests	–	–
1943/44	Easts	–	–
1944/45	Wests	–	–
1945/46	Toombul	–	–
1946/47	Toombul	–	–
1947/48	Wests	–	–
1948/49	Wests	–	–
1949/50	Colts	–	–
1950/51	Colts	–	–
1951/52	Easts	–	–
1952/53	Toombul	–	–
1953/54	Easts	–	–
1954/55	Toombul	–	–
1955/56	Norths	–	–
1956/57	Easts	–	–
1957/58	Wests	–	–
1958/59	Wests	–	–
1959/60	University	–	–
1960/61	Wests	–	–
1961/62	South Brisbane	–	–
1962/63	South Brisbane	–	–
1963/64	South Brisbane	–	–
1964/65	University	–	–
1965/66	Colts	–	–
1966/67	South Brisbane	–	–
1967/68	University	–	–
1968/69	South Brisbane	–	–
1969/70	University	–	–
1970/71	Norths	–	–
1971/72	Norths	–	–
1972/73	Norths	Valley	–
1973/74	University	Valley	–
1974/75	Valley	Wynnum-Manly	–
1975/76	University	Sandgate-Redcliffe	–
1976/77	South Brisbane	Wynnum-Manly	–
1977/78	South Brisbane	Norths	–
1978/79	Norths	Wynnum-Manly	–
1979/80	Easts	South Brisbane	–
1980/81	Wynnum-Manly	-	–
1981/82	Wynnum-Manly	Norths	–
1982/83	Wynnum-Manly	South Brisbane	–
1983/84	South Brisbane	Norths	–
1984/85	Valley	Norths	–
1985/86	South Brisbane	South Brisbane	–
1986/87	Norths	Valley	–
1987/88	Wests	University	–
1988/89	South Brisbane	Wests	–
1989/90	Easts	South Brisbane	–
1990/91	South Brisbane	Sandgate-Redcliffe	–
1991/92	Toombul	University	–
1992/93	University	Gold Coast	–
1993/94	Toombul	University	–
1994/95	Valley	University	–
1995/96	Wynnum-Manly	Sunshine Coast	–
1996/97	Valley	Valley	–
1997/98	Sandgate-Redcliffe	Toombul	–
1998/99	Sandgate-Redcliffe	East-Redlands	–
1999/2000	Sandgate-Redcliffe	Wynnum-Manly	–
2000/01	South Brisbane	Valley	–
2001/02	Sandgate-Redcliffe	Norths	–
2002/03	Gold Coast	University	–
2003/04	Sandgate-Redcliffe	University	–
2004/05	Wests	Norths	–
2005/06	Sunshine Coast	Wests	University
2006/07	University	University	Norths
2007/08	Wests	University	University
2008/09	Gold Coast	University	Wynnum-Manly
2009/10	Gold Coast	Gold Coast	Gold Coast
2010/11	Wynnum-Manly	University	University
2011/12	University	University	University
2012/13	Toombul	Toombul	Valley
2013/14	Valley	University	Valley
2014/15	University	Wynnum-Manly	University
2015/16	East-Redlands	University	Sandgate-Redcliffe
2016/17	Wests	University	Sandgate-Redcliffe
2017/18	Norths	Sandgate-Redcliffe	Sandgate-Redcliffe
2018/19	University	Valley	Valley
2019/20	University	Wests	University
2020/21	University	East-Redlands	Gold Coast
2021/22	Western Suburbs	Gold Coast	Gold Coast
2022/23	Easts-Redlands	Gold Coast	Gold Coast
2023/24	Norths	Norths	Ipswich
2024/25	-	University	Valley
Source: . Last updated: 2024.

== See also ==
- Cricket in Queensland
