= 2020 Under-19 Cricket World Cup squads =

List of cricket squads

The following squads were selected for the 2020 Under-19 Cricket World Cup.

== Afghanistan ==
Afghanistan's squad was announced on 8 December 2019.

- Farhan Zakhil (c)
- Noor Ahmad
- Sediqullah Atal
- Shafiqullah Ghafari
- Fazalhaq Farooqi
- Imran Mir
- Jamshid Miralikhil
- Abid Mohammadi
- Mohammad Ishaq (wk)
- Asif Musazai
- Abdul Rahman
- Abidullah Taniwal
- Ibrahim Zadran
- Rahmanullah
- Zohaib

== Australia ==
Australia's squad was announced on 13 December 2019. Initially, Australia did not name a captain of their squad, however Mackenzie Harvey was officially named as the team captain just ahead of their opening match.

- Mackenzie Harvey (c)
- Cooper Connolly
- Oliver Davies
- Sam Fanning
- Jake Fraser-McGurk
- Lachlan Hearne
- Corey Kelly
- Liam Marshall
- Todd Murphy
- Patrick Rowe
- Tanveer Sangha
- Liam Scott
- Bradley Simpson
- Connor Sully
- Matthew Willans

== Bangladesh ==
Bangladesh's squad was announced on 21 December 2019. Ahead of the Super League quarterfinal, Mrittunjoy Chowdhury was ruled out of Bangladesh's squad, with Meherob Hasan named as his replacement.

- Akbar Ali (c)
- Towhid Hridoy (vc)
- Shahin Alam
- Mrittunjoy Chowdhury
- Avishek Das
- Parvez Hossain Emon
- SM Meherob
- Rakibul Hasan
- Tanzid Hasan
- Mahmudul Hasan Joy
- Shahadat Hossain
- Shamim Hossain
- Shoriful Islam
- Hasan Murad
- Prantik Nawrose Nabil
- Tanzim Hasan Sakib

== Canada ==
Canada's squad was announced on 18 December 2019.

- Ashtan Deosammy (c)
- Harmandeep Singh Bedi
- Ben Calitz
- Arshdeep Dhaliwal
- Gurjot Gosal
- Rishiv Joshi
- Muhammad Kamal
- Akhil Kumar
- Nicholas Manohar
- Mihir Patel
- Randhir Sandhu
- Eshan Sensarma
- Raqib Shamsudeen
- Ayush Verma
- Udaybir Walia

== England ==
England's squad was announced on 23 December 2019.

Player	Date of Birth	Batting	Bowling style
George Balderson (c)	11 October 2000 (aged 19)	Left	Right-arm medium
Kasey Aldridge	24 December 2000 (aged 19)	Right	Right-arm medium
Ben Charlesworth	19 November 2000 (aged 19)	Left	Right-arm medium-fast
Tom Clark	27 February 2001 (aged 18)	Left	Right-arm medium
Jordan Cox (wk)	21 October 2000 (aged 19)	Right	–
Blake Cullen	19 February 2002 (aged 17)	Right	Right-arm fast-medium
Scott Currie	2 May 2001 (aged 18)	Right	Right-arm medium-fast
Harry Duke (wk)	6 September 2001 (aged 18)	Right	–
Joey Evison	14 November 2001 (aged 18)	Right	Right-arm medium
Lewis Goldsworthy	8 January 2001 (aged 19)	Right	Left-arm orthodox
Hamidullah Qadri	5 December 2000 (aged 19)	Right	Right-arm off spin
Jack Haynes	30 January 2001 (aged 18)	Right	Right-arm off spin
George Hill (vc)	24 January 2001 (aged 18)	Right	Right-arm medium
Dan Mousley	8 July 2001 (aged 18)	Left	Right-arm off spin
Sam Young	30 July 2000 (aged 19)	Right	Right-arm off spin

== India ==
India's squad was announced on 2 December 2019. On 10 January 2020, Divyansh Joshi was ruled out of India's squad due to an injury, with Siddhesh Veer named as his replacement.

- Priyam Garg (c)
- Dhruv Jurel (vc, wk)
- Atharva Ankolekar
- Ravi Bishnoi
- Shubhang Hegde
- Yashasvi Jaiswal
- ~~Mohit Negi~~
- Kumar Kushagra (wk)
- Sushant Mishra
- Vidyadhar Patil
- Shashwat Rawat
- Divyaansh Saxena
- Akash Singh
- Kartik Tyagi
- Tilak Varma
- Siddhesh Veer

== Japan ==
Japan's squad was announced on 6 December 2019.

- Marcus Thurgate (c, wk)
- Neel Date (vc)
- Maximilian Clements
- Tushar Chaturvedi
- Kento Ota-Dobell
- Ishaan Fartyal
- Sora Ichiki
- Leon Mehlig
- Masato Morita
- Shu Noguchi
- Yugandhar Retharekar
- Debashish Sahoo
- Reiji Suto
- Kazumasa Takahashi
- Ashley Thurgate

== New Zealand ==
New Zealand's squad was announced on 12 December 2019.

- Jesse Tashkoff (c)
- Adithya Ashok
- Kristian Clarke
- Hayden Dickson
- Joey Field
- David Hancock
- Simon Keene
- Fergus Lellman
- Nicholas Lidstone
- Rhys Mariu
- William O’Rourke
- Ben Pomare
- Quinn Sunde
- Beckham Wheeler-Greenall
- Oliver White

== Nigeria ==
Nigeria's squad was announced on 7 December 2019.

- Sylvester Okpe (c)
- Mohameed Taiwo (vc)
- Rasheed Abolarin
- Peter Aho
- Miracle Akhigbe
- Shehu Audu
- Oche Boniface
- Isaac Danladi
- Miracle Ikaige
- Akhere Isesele
- Abdulrahman Jimoh
- Samuel Mba
- Olayinka Olaleye
- Sulaimon Runsewe
- Ifeanyichukwu Uboh

== Pakistan ==
Pakistan's squad was announced on 6 December 2019. On 31 December 2019, Naseem Shah was withdrawn from the squad, after an impressive start in Test cricket, with Mohammad Wasim named as his replacement.

- Rohail Nazir (c, wk)
- Haider Ali (vc)
- Abbas Afridi
- Qasim Akram
- Aamir Ali
- Arish Ali Khan
- Abdul Bangalzai
- Mohammad Haris
- Fahad Munir
- Mohammad Huraira
- Tahir Hussain
- Irfan Khan
- Mohammad Amir Khan
- ~~Naseem Shah~~
- Muhammad Shehzad
- Mohammad Wasim

== Scotland ==
Scotland's squad was announced on 13 December 2019. Ahead of the tournament, Durness Mackay-Champion was ruled out of Scotland's squad, with Lyle Robertson named as his replacement.

- Angus Guy (c)
- Daniel Cairns
- Jamie Cairns
- Jasper Davidson
- Ben Davidson
- Sean Fischer-Keogh
- Callum Grant
- Rory Hanley
- Tomas Mackintosh
- ~~Durness Mackay-Champion~~
- Euan McBeth
- Liam Naylor
- Charlie Peet
- Lyle Robertson
- Kess Sajjad
- Uzzair Shah

== South Africa ==
South Africa's squad was announced on 10 December 2019.

- Bryce Parsons (c)
- Khanya Cotani (vc)
- Luke Beaufort
- Jonathan Bird
- Merrick Brett
- Achille Cloete
- Gerald Coetzee
- Tyrese Karelse
- Mondli Khumalo
- Jack Lees
- Andrew Louw
- Levert Manje
- Odirile Modimokoane
- Pheko Moletsane
- Tiaan van Vuuren

== Sri Lanka ==
Sri Lanka's squad was announced on 6 January 2020.

- Nipun Dananjaya (c)
- Ashian Daniel
- Sonal Dinusha
- Thaveesha Kahaduwaarachchi
- Dilshan Madushanka
- Kamil Mishara
- Kavindu Nadeeshan
- Navod Paranavithana
- Matheesha Pathirana
- Ravindu Rasantha
- Mohammed Shamaaz
- Amshi de Silva
- Dilum Sudeera
- Ahan Wickramasinghe

== United Arab Emirates ==
The UAE's squad was announced on 10 December 2019.

- Aryan Lakra (c)
- Vriitya Aravind
- Deshan Chethyia
- Muhammad Farazuddin
- Jonathan Figy
- Syed Haider
- Osama Hassan
- Palaniapan Meiyappan
- Rishabh Mukherjee
- Ali Naseer
- Alishan Sharafu
- Sanchit Sharma
- Kai Smith
- Akasha Tahir
- Ansh Tandon

== West Indies ==
The West Indies' squad was announced on 25 November 2019.

- Kimani Melius (c)
- Kevlon Anderson
- Daniel Beckford
- Matthew Forde
- Joshua James
- Mbeki Joseph
- Leonardo Julien
- Avinash Mahabirsingh
- Kirk McKenzie
- Antonio Morris
- Ashmead Nedd
- Matthew Patrick
- Jayden Seales
- Ramon Simmonds
- Nyeem Young

== Zimbabwe ==
Zimbabwe's squad was announced on 8 December 2019. Ahead of the tournament, Brandon James was ruled out of Zimbabwe's squad, with Sukhemuzi Ndlela named as his replacement.

- Dion Myers (c)
- Wesley Madhevere (vc)
- Emmanuel Bawa
- Privilege Chesa
- Gareth Chirawu
- Ahomed Rameez Ebrahim
- Dylan Grant
- ~~Brandon James~~
- Tadiwanashe Marumani
- Sukhemuzi Ndlela
- Tadiwanashe Nyangani
- Luke Oldknow
- Samuel Ruwisi
- Dane Schadendorf
- Milton Shumba
- Taurayi Tugwete
