= 2021–22 Sheffield Shield season =

Cricket tournament

2021–22 Sheffield Shield
- Dates: 24 September 2021 – 4 April 2022
- Administrator: Cricket Australia
- Cricket format: First-class
- Tournament format(s): Double round-robin and final
- Champions: Western Australia (16th title)
- Participants: 6
- Matches: 24
- Player of the series: Henry Hunt (South Australia) & Travis Dean (Victoria)
- Most runs: Peter Handscomb (Victoria) (697)
- Most wickets: Mark Steketee (Queensland) (32)

The 2021–22 Sheffield Shield season was the 120th of the Australian inter-state domestic first-class cricket competition. Queensland were the defending champions.

Initially, on 21 July 2021, Cricket Australia confirmed all the fixtures for the tournament. Then on 8 September 2021, it announced that the previous schedule had been scrapped due to ongoing lockdowns in Sydney and Melbourne and subsequent border restrictions. The fixtures for the first two matches were confirmed, with the full revised schedule to be released later. However, the second match of round one, between Queensland and Tasmania, was postponed following an increase in COVID-19 cases in the state of Queensland.

On 1 October 2021, Cricket Australia announced revised fixtures for October with Queensland playing Tasmania in Adelaide beginning on the 7th, South Australia playing Queensland in Adelaide beginning on the 15th, and Tasmania visiting Perth to play Western Australia on the 17th. On 20 October 2021 following the border openings in Sydney and Melbourne, Cricket Australia confirmed the next set of fixtures. On 5 November 2021, Cricket Australia confirmed the schedule for three further fixtures, with the venue for the first match of the fifth round between South Australia and Queensland to be decided based on the location of WBBL|07 season finals. On 21 November 2021, it announced Adelaide Oval as the venue for the BBL|07 finals and Karen Rolton Oval in Adelaide for the South Australia versus Queensland match.

On 19 November 2021, the start of the match between New South Wales and Victoria was delayed, after Victoria player Will Sutherland's COVID-19 test result required further analysis. Despite the positive test, Cricket Australia confirmed that the match would start a day later than planned on 20 November 2021.

Western Australia were the first team to reach the final of the competition, with them hosting the final for the first time since the 1997–98 Sheffield Shield season. Victoria finished in second place to join Western Australia in the final. The final ended in a draw, with Western Australia winning the tournament having earned more bonus points in their first 100 overs compared to Victoria.

== Points table ==
Team	Pld	W	L	D	A	Ave	Pts
Western Australia	7	3	2	2	0	4.69	32.82
Victoria	7	3	1	3	0	4.31	30.17
Tasmania	8	3	3	2	0	3.89	31.09
New South Wales	7	2	3	2	0	3.07	21.50
Queensland	9	2	3	4	0	3.03	27.23
South Australia	8	1	2	5	0	2.71	21.66

== Round-Robin stage ==
=== Round 1 ===
24–27 September 2021
Scorecard

Western Australia	v	South Australia
9/465d (131.2 overs); Shaun Marsh 118 (190); Lloyd Pope 4/92 (15.2 overs)		492 (128 overs); Travis Head 163 (215); Joel Paris 3/73 (26 overs)
6/292 (85 overs); Hilton Cartwright 121* (186); Lloyd Pope 3/123 (22 overs)

Match drawn
Karen Rolton Oval, Adelaide
Umpires: Michael Graham-Smith and Sam Nogajski
Player of the match: Travis Head (South Australia)

- Western Australia won the toss and elected to bat.
- Corey Rocchiccioli (Western Australia) made his first-class debut.
- Jake Carder (South Australia) scored his maiden century in first-class cricket.

7–10 October 2021
Scorecard

Tasmania	v	Queensland
6/500d (156.2 overs); Tim Ward 144 (343); Michael Neser 2/60 (24.4 overs)		5/355d (109 overs); Bryce Street 143 (334); Sam Rainbird 2/80 (21 overs)
3/163 (75 overs); Tim Ward 81 (130); Matthew Kuhnemann 3/61 (26 overs)

Match drawn
Karen Rolton Oval, Adelaide
Umpires: Darren Close and Donovan Koch
Player of the match: Tim Ward (Tasmania)

- Tasmania won the toss and elected to bat.
- Tim Ward (Tasmania) scored his maiden century in first-class cricket.

15–18 October 2021
Scorecard

Queensland	v	South Australia
152 (59.1 overs); Joe Burns 48 (99); Daniel Worrall 4/49 (17 overs)		280 (89.4 overs); Harry Nielsen 71 (126); Mark Steketee 7/44 (26.4 overs)
7/451d (139 overs); Usman Khawaja 174 (294); Lloyd Pope 2/58 (16 overs)		6/244 (88.3 overs); Jake Carder 79 (149); Mark Steketee 3/48 (24 overs)

Match drawn
Adelaide Oval, Adelaide
Umpires: Donovan Koch and Shawn Craig
Player of the match: Mark Steketee (Queensland)

- South Australia won the toss and elected to field.

=== Round 2 ===
17–20 October 2021
Scorecard

Western Australia	v	Tasmania
238 (88.1 overs); Josh Philippe 60 (143); Lawrence Neil-Smith 5/43 (15.1 overs)		252 (79.3 overs); Lawrence Neil-Smith 60 (126); Hilton Cartwright 4/23 (7 overs)
230 (84.1 overs); Shaun Marsh 58 (150); Peter Siddle 5/40 (22.1 overs)		7/217 (53.4 overs); Caleb Jewell 52 (51); Lance Morris 2/33 (4.4 overs)

Tasmania won by 3 wickets
WACA Ground, Perth
Umpires: Michael Graham-Smith and Sam Nogajski
Player of the match: Lawrence Neil-Smith (Tasmania)

- Tasmania won the toss and elected to field.
- Lawrence Neil-Smith (Tasmania) took his maiden five-wicket haul in first-class cricket.
- Riley Meredith replaced Lawrence Neil-Smith for Tasmania on day 2 as concussion substitute.

27–30 October 2021
Scorecard

South Australia	v	Western Australia
128 (48.3 overs); Jake Carder 37 (96); Jhye Richardson 3/22 (11.3 overs)		299 (106 overs); Hilton Cartwright 73 (154); Nathan McAndrew 5/84 (32.4 overs)
291 (97.3 overs); Henry Hunt 108 (245); Joel Paris 5/63 (28 overs)		4/121 (40.2 overs); Cameron Green 38* (90); Nathan McAndrew 1/29 (14 overs)

Western Australia won by 6 wickets
WACA Ground, Perth
Umpires: Darren Close and Michael Graham-Smith
Player of the match: Joel Paris (Western Australia)

- Western Australia won the toss and elected to field.
- Nathan McAndrew (South Australia) took his maiden five-wicket haul in first-class cricket.

27–30 October 2021
Scorecard

Queensland	v	Tasmania
6/487d (136 overs); Marnus Labuschagne 136 (208); Riley Meredith 2/59 (23 overs)		182 (73.1 overs); Jordan Silk 47 (136); Matthew Kuhnemann 5/60 (30.1 overs)
1/132d (30 overs); Marnus Labuschagne 60* (46); Gabe Bell 1/11 (4 overs)		341 (109.3 overs); Caleb Jewell 90 (157); Matthew Kuhnemann 5/107 (43 overs)

Queensland won by 96 runs
Riverway Stadium, Townsville
Umpires: Donovan Koch and Bruce Oxenford
Player of the match: Matthew Kuhnemann (Queensland)

- Queensland won the toss and elected to bat.
- Connor Sully (Queensland) made his first-class debut.
- Matthew Kuhnemann (Queensland) took his maiden five-wicket haul in first-class cricket.

=== Round 3 ===
27–30 October 2021
Scorecard

Victoria	v	New South Wales
199 (75.4 overs); Nic Maddinson 87 (136); Sean Abbott 6/38 (15.4 overs)		151 (77 overs); Kurtis Patterson 48 (143); Scott Boland 4/34 (19 overs)
3/290d (116 overs); Marcus Harris 137 (361); Sean Abbott 2/74 (25 overs)		134 (94 overs); Peter Nevill 29* (129); Jon Holland 3/16 (23 overs)

Victoria won by 204 runs
Drummoyne Oval, Sydney
Umpires: Gerard Abood and Greg Davidson
Player of the match: Nic Maddinson (Victoria)

- Victoria won the toss and elected to bat.
- Tanveer Sangha (New South Wales) made his first-class debut.

5–8 November 2021
Scorecard

Victoria	v	New South Wales
9/313d (103.4 overs); Nic Maddinson 128 (206); Liam Hatcher 3/81 (21.3 overs)		140 (62 overs); Daniel Hughes 59 (132); Scott Boland 3/33 (18 overs)
5/248d (76.2 overs); Matthew Short 90 (122); Jack Edwards 3/47 (16.2 overs)		247 (111.3 overs); Daniel Hughes 89* (319); Scott Boland 5/56 (29.3 overs)

Victoria won by 174 runs
Melbourne Cricket Ground, Melbourne
Umpires: Phillip Gillespie and Tony Wilds
Player of the match: Scott Boland (Victoria)

- New South Wales won the toss and elected to field.
- James Seymour (Victoria) scored his maiden century in first-class cricket.
- Wil Parker replaced Jon Holland for Victoria on day 2 as concussion substitute.

10–13 November 2021
Scorecard

Queensland	v	Western Australia
129 (53.1 overs); Usman Khawaja 70 (138); Lance Morris 4/21 (10.1 overs)		281 (83.2 overs); Josh Philippe 129 (222); Mark Steketee 4/74 (22 overs)
246 (82.2 overs); Joe Burns 49 (99); Jhye Richardson 5/23 (22.2 overs)		3/95 (33.3 overs); Cameron Bancroft 47* (98); Mark Steketee 2/21 (9 overs)

Western Australia won by 7 wickets
The Gabba, Brisbane
Umpires: Shawn Craig and Bruce Oxenford
Player of the match: Jhye Richardson (Western Australia)

- Western Australia won the toss and elected to field.
- Jayden Goodwin (Western Australia) made his first-class debut.

=== Round 4 ===
10–13 November 2021
Scorecard

South Australia	v	Tasmania
220 (75.1 overs); Henry Hunt 134 (236); Peter Siddle 4/42 (24 overs)		282 (104.4 overs); Charlie Wakim 68 (121); Travis Head 2/22 (6 overs)
0/32 (13.4 overs); Jake Weatherald 16* (45)

Match drawn
Blundstone Arena, Hobart
Umpires: Darren Close and Sam Nogajski
Player of the match: Henry Hunt (South Australia)

- Tasmania won the toss and elected to field.
- Only 15.1 overs, 47 overs and 38.2 overs of play were possible on day 1, day 3 and day 4 respectively due to rain.

20–23 November 2021
Scorecard

New South Wales	v	Victoria
233 (63.1 overs); Daniel Hughes 70 (154); Jonathan Merlo 2/14 (6 overs)		271 (102.3 overs); Travis Dean 144* (300); Chris Tremain 4/52 (25.3 overs)
7/285d (58 overs); Kurtis Patterson 112 (144); James Pattinson 5/71 (18 overs)		4/91 (43 overs); Peter Handscomb 39 (73); Jack Edwards 1/1 (3 overs)

Match drawn
Sydney Cricket Ground, Sydney
Umpires: Phillip Gillespie and Ben Treloar
Player of the match: Travis Dean (Victoria)

- Victoria won the toss and elected to field.
- No play was possible on day 2 due to rain.
- Brody Couch, Xavier Crone (Victoria) and Hayden Kerr (New South Wales) all made their first-class debuts.

21–24 November 2021
Scorecard

Western Australia	v	Tasmania
9/405d (108 overs); Sam Whiteman 176* (309); Lawrence Neil-Smith 3/72 (21 overs)		315 (115.4 overs); Caleb Jewell 102 (206); Jhye Richardson 4/53 (28 overs)
7/226d (65 overs); Cameron Green 54 (96); Gabe Bell 2/29 (12 overs)		6/318 (78 overs); Jordan Silk 83* (100); Jhye Richardson 3/56 (16 overs)

Tasmania won by 4 wickets
Blundstone Arena, Hobart
Umpires: Nathan Johnstone and Bruce Oxenford
Player of the match: Caleb Jewell (Tasmania)

- Tasmania won the toss and elected to field.

=== Round 5 ===
23–26 November 2021
Scorecard

Queensland	v	South Australia
299 (120.5 overs); Marnus Labuschagne 110 (223); Liam Scott 3/16 (17 overs)		102 (45 overs); Jake Weatherald 33 (69); Matthew Kuhnemann 5/25 (14 overs)
2/88 (24 overs); Usman Khawaja 52* (36); Nathan McAndrew 2/27 (6 overs)		284 (93 overs) (f/o); Travis Head 101 (149); Gurinder Sandhu 6/57 (21 overs)

Queensland won by 8 wickets
Karen Rolton Oval, Adelaide
Umpires: Donovan Koch and Michael Graham-Smith
Player of the match: Matthew Kuhnemann (Queensland)

- South Australia won the toss and elected to field.
- Only 50 overs of play was possible on day 1 due to pitch conditions.

=== Round 6 ===
9–12 February 2022
Scorecard

South Australia	v	Victoria
366 (126.4 overs); Daniel Drew 130 (317); Mitchell Perry 4/57 (30 overs)		264 (94.3 overs); Nic Maddinson 82 (134); Nathan McAndrew 3/60 (23 overs)
213 (58 overs); Henry Hunt 57 (95); Will Sutherland 3/42 (14 overs)		6/236 (90 overs); Peter Handscomb 148* (280); Brendan Doggett 4/51 (21 overs)

Match drawn
Adelaide Oval, Adelaide
Umpires: Greg Davidson and David Taylor
Player of the match: Peter Handscomb (Victoria)

- South Australia won the toss and elected to bat.
- Travis Dean replaced Will Pucovski for Victoria on day 4 as concussion substitute.

9–12 February 2022
Scorecard

Queensland	v	New South Wales
193 (77.1 overs); Usman Khawaja 63 (155); Chris Tremain 3/26 (17 overs)		186 (55.1 overs); Daniel Hughes 86* (155); Mark Steketee 5/46 (19.1 overs)
129 (52.4 overs); Marnus Labuschagne 44 (80); Trent Copeland 3/28 (13.4 overs)		8/137 (51.3 overs); Lachlan Hearne 28 (43); Michael Neser 3/38 (17 overs)

New South Wales won by 2 wickets
The Gabba, Brisbane
Umpires: Ben Treloar and Tony Wilds
Player of the match: Chris Tremain (New South Wales)

- New South Wales won the toss and elected to field.
- Ryan Hackney (New South Wales) made his first-class debut.

=== Round 7 ===
18–21 February 2022
Scorecard

New South Wales	v	Tasmania
276 (98.5 overs); Hayden Kerr 88 (129); Jackson Bird 3/38 (19.5 overs)		213 (86 overs); Mac Wright 57 (164); Chris Tremain 5/48 (17 overs)
9/226d (83 overs); Jason Sangha 75 (178); Beau Webster 3/40 (12 overs)		214 (86.2 overs); Mac Wright 78* (186); Trent Copeland 4/46 (18.2 overs)

New South Wales won by 75 runs
Sydney Cricket Ground, Sydney
Umpires: Gerard Abood and Tony Wilds
Player of the match: Hayden Kerr (New South Wales)

- New South Wales won the toss and elected to bat.
- Nivethan Radhakrishnan (Tasmania) made his first-class debut.

18–21 February 2022
Scorecard

Queensland	v	Victoria
349 (127.1 overs); Jack Clayton 109 (235); Matthew Short 4/74 (19.1 overs)		360 (128 overs); Nic Maddinson 110* (147); Gurinder Sandhu 5/65 (27 overs)
7/246d (79 overs); Jimmy Peirson 76 (141); Mitchell Perry 3/61 (17 overs)		3/104 (48 overs); Nic Maddinson 48* (116); Matt Renshaw 1/10 (4 overs)

Match drawn
Junction Oval, Melbourne
Umpires: Greg Davidson and Simon Lightbody
Player of the match: Nic Maddinson (Victoria)

- Queensland won the toss and elected to bat.
- Jack Clayton (Queensland) made his first-class debut.

=== Round 8 ===
2–5 March 2022
Scorecard

Queensland	v	South Australia
8/305d (100 overs); Jack Clayton 85 (164); Brendan Doggett 2/59 (25 overs)		9/244d (75.4 overs); Jake Lehmann 102 (177); Gurinder Sandhu 3/64 (23 overs)
191 (43.3 overs); Sam Truloff 64 (86); Liam Scott 5/46 (16 overs)		3/115 (37 overs); Jake Weatherald 60* (112); Xavier Bartlett 2/30 (11 overs)

Match drawn
The Gabba, Brisbane
Umpires: Bruce Oxenford and Darren Close

- South Australia won the toss and elected to field.
- No play was possible on day 1 due to rain.

15–18 March 2022
Scorecard

Western Australia	v	New South Wales
6/356d (141 overs); Cameron Bancroft 117 (262); Jack Edwards 3/58 (21 overs)		208 (79.1 overs); Jason Sangha 86 (213); Matthew Kelly 3/27 (16 overs)
4/75d (40 overs); Sam Whiteman 27* (111); Chris Tremain 2/12 (8 overs)

Match drawn
Bankstown Oval, Sydney
Umpires: Gerard Abood and Greg Davidson
Player of the match: Cameron Bancroft (Western Australia)

- Western Australia won the toss and elected to bat.
- No play was possible on day 2 due to rain.
- Riley Ayre (New South Wales) made his first-class debut.
- Riley Ayre replaced Tanveer Sangha for New South Wales on day 2 as concussion substitute.

15–18 March 2022
Scorecard

Tasmania	v	Victoria
355 (117.4 overs); Ben McDermott 94 (209); Jon Holland 4/82 (23.4 overs)		7/334d (108 overs); Travis Dean 146 (302); Tom Andrews 2/53 (19 overs)
209 (69.2 overs); Matthew Wade 50 (87); Mitchell Perry 4/31 (11.2 overs)		8/234 (73.4 overs); Travis Dean 47 (36); Ben Manenti 3/89 (31.4 overs)

Victoria won by 2 wickets
Junction Oval, Melbourne
Umpires: Shawn Craig and Nathan Johnstone
Player of the match: Travis Dean (Victoria)

- Tasmania won the toss and elected to bat.
- Ben Manenti (Tasmania) made his first-class debut.

=== Round 9 ===
23–26 March 2022
Scorecard

New South Wales	v	South Australia
294 (112.1 overs); Jason Sangha 142 (235); Jordan Buckingham 4/79 (27 overs)		9/277d (98 overs); Henry Hunt 109 (238); Chris Tremain 3/51 (23 overs)
8/308d (84 overs); Lachlan Hearne 65 (107); Nathan McSweeney 4/89 (26 overs)		5/328 (76 overs); Nathan McSweeney 99* (183); Harry Conway 1/38 (10 overs)

South Australia won by 5 wickets
Karen Rolton Oval, Adelaide
Umpires: Donovan Koch and Shawn Craig
Player of the match: Jason Sangha (New South Wales)

- South Australia won the toss and elected to field.
- Bailey Capel, Jordan Buckingham, Thomas Kelly (South Australia) and Blake Nikitaras (New South Wales) all made their first-class debuts.

23–26 March 2022
Scorecard

Queensland	v	Tasmania
104 (40.5 overs); Joe Burns 28 (81); Sam Rainbird 8/21 (14.5 overs)		422 (105.1 overs); Beau Webster 166* (172); Gurinder Sandhu 3/82 (27.1 overs)
87 (38.2 overs); Joe Burns 30 (48); Sam Rainbird 5/21 (12.2 overs)

Tasmania won by an innings and 231 runs
Bellerive Oval, Hobart
Umpires: Michael Graham-Smith and Sam Nogajski
Player of the match: Sam Rainbird (Tasmania)

- Tasmania won the toss and elected to bat.
- Sam Rainbird took the best bowling figures for Tasmania in a first-class match.
- Sam Rainbird also took the best match figures for Tasmania in the Sheffield Shield with 13/42.

23–26 March 2022
Scorecard

Victoria	v	Western Australia
114 (43.5 overs); Matthew Short 43 (81); Aaron Hardie 4/24 (12 overs)		337 (105.2 overs); Hilton Cartwright 109 (178); Will Sutherland 3/67 (25 overs)
172 (60.3 overs); Matthew Short 35 (53); Joel Paris 3/31 (16 overs)

Western Australia won by an innings and 51 runs
WACA Ground, Perth
Umpires: Gerard Abood and Phillip Gillespie
Player of the match: Hilton Cartwright (Western Australia)

- Western Australia won the toss and elected to field.
- Cameron McClure (Victoria) and Teague Wyllie (Western Australia) both made their first-class debuts.

== Final ==
31 March – 4 April 2022
Scorecard

Western Australia	v	Victoria
386 (121.1 overs); Cameron Bancroft 141 (269); Will Sutherland 5/78 (30.1 overs)		306 (105.2 overs); Peter Handscomb 80 (141); Aaron Hardie 3/54 (24 overs)
7/400d (163 overs); Aaron Hardie 174* (317); Scott Boland 2/35 (25 overs)

Match drawn
WACA Ground, Perth
Umpires: Donovan Koch and Sam Nogajski
Player of the match: Sam Whiteman (Western Australia)

- Victoria won the toss and elected to field.

== Statistics ==
=== Most runs ===
Player	Team	Mat	Inns	NO	Runs	Ave	HS	100	50
Peter Handscomb	Victoria	8	15	1	697	49.78	148*	2	3
Sam Whiteman	Western Australia	7	13	2	641	58.27	176*	2	2
Hilton Cartwright	Western Australia	8	15	1	601	42.92	121*	2	3
Henry Hunt	South Australia	8	15	1	601	42.92	134	3	1
Tim Ward	Tasmania	8	14	0	552	39.42	144	1	3

=== Most wickets ===
Player	Team	Mat	Inns	Overs	Wkts	Ave	Econ	BBI	BBM	5	10
Mark Steketee	Queensland	6	12	209.2	32	17.93	2.74	7/44	10/92	2	1
Nathan McAndrew	South Australia	8	15	302.4	27	30.18	2.69	5/84	6/113	1	0
Scott Boland	Victoria	5	10	218.3	26	17.07	2.03	5/56	8/89	1	0
Gurinder Sandhu	Queensland	6	11	175.1	25	19.16	2.73	6/57	7/68	2	0
Matthew Kuhnemann	Queensland	7	13	289.3	25	31.88	2.75	5/25	10/167	3	1
