= Thomas Kelly (cricketer, born 2000) =

Australian cricketer

Personal information
- Full name: Thomas James Kelly
- Born: 14 December 2000 (age 25); Ashford, South Australia
- Batting: Right-handed
- Role: Batter
- Relatives: Corey Kelly (twin brother)

Domestic team information
- Years: Team
- 2021/22–2025/26: South Australia (squad no. 31)
- 2021/22–2025/26: Adelaide Strikers (squad no. 31)

Career statistics
Competition	FC	LA	T20
Matches	10	11	34
Runs scored	464	261	409
Batting average	24.42	29.00	20.45
100s/50s	0/3	0/2	0/0
Top score	69	81	43
Catches/stumpings	6/–	5/–	12/–
- Source: ESPNCricinfo, 18 May 2026

Thomas James Kelly (born 14 December 2000) is an Australian cricketer. He made his List A debut for South Australia against Queensland on 28 November 2021 during the 2021–22 Marsh One-Day Cup. He is the twin brother of Australian cricketer Corey Kelly. He made his Twenty20 debut on 11 December 2021, for the Adelaide Strikers in the 2021–22 Big Bash League season.

== Personal life ==
Thomas Kelly was born on 14 December 2000 in the southern suburbs of Adelaide, South Australia, to Matthew Kelly, a member of the original Adelaide Crows squad for the Australian Football League, and Tina. He is the identical twin brother of fellow cricketer Corey Kelly, who was born two minutes earlier; they have a younger sister, Lucy. Kelly grew up in a sports-focused family influenced by his father's AFL career. The twins played over 100 games of Australian rules football with Mitcham Hawks Football Club and Norwood Football Club before shifting their focus to cricket, which the elder Kelly had also played.

== Career ==
The Kelly brothers began playing cricket at the school level. Before the age of fifteen, Corey was predominantly a batter and Thomas predominantly a bowler; they switched roles after discovering each had a greater affinity for the opposite position. Thomas Kelly narrowly missed out on being selected to appear on Australia's team for the 2020 Under-19 Cricket World Cup in South Africa, while his brother was selected to play for the team. Kelly spent his early career as a player for the Sturt Cricket Club, which he described in 2021 as being "in an awesome spot at the moment".

At the age of 20, the Kelly brothers were signed to the West End Redbacks, South Australia's professional first class cricket team. They became the first twins to play cricket together for South Australia. They played their debut game for the Redbacks in November 2021. Though South Australia lost the game, Kelly described his debut as "unbelievable" and as an experience he was "very fortunate" to have had. Corey and Thomas Kelly are the first identical twins to play first class cricket on the same team in Australia since Kate and Alex Blackwell.

He made his first-class debut on 23 March 2022, for South Australia in the 2021–22 Sheffield Shield season.

Kelly decided to step away from professional cricket at the end of the 2025/26 season.
