= List of Brisbane Heat cricketers =

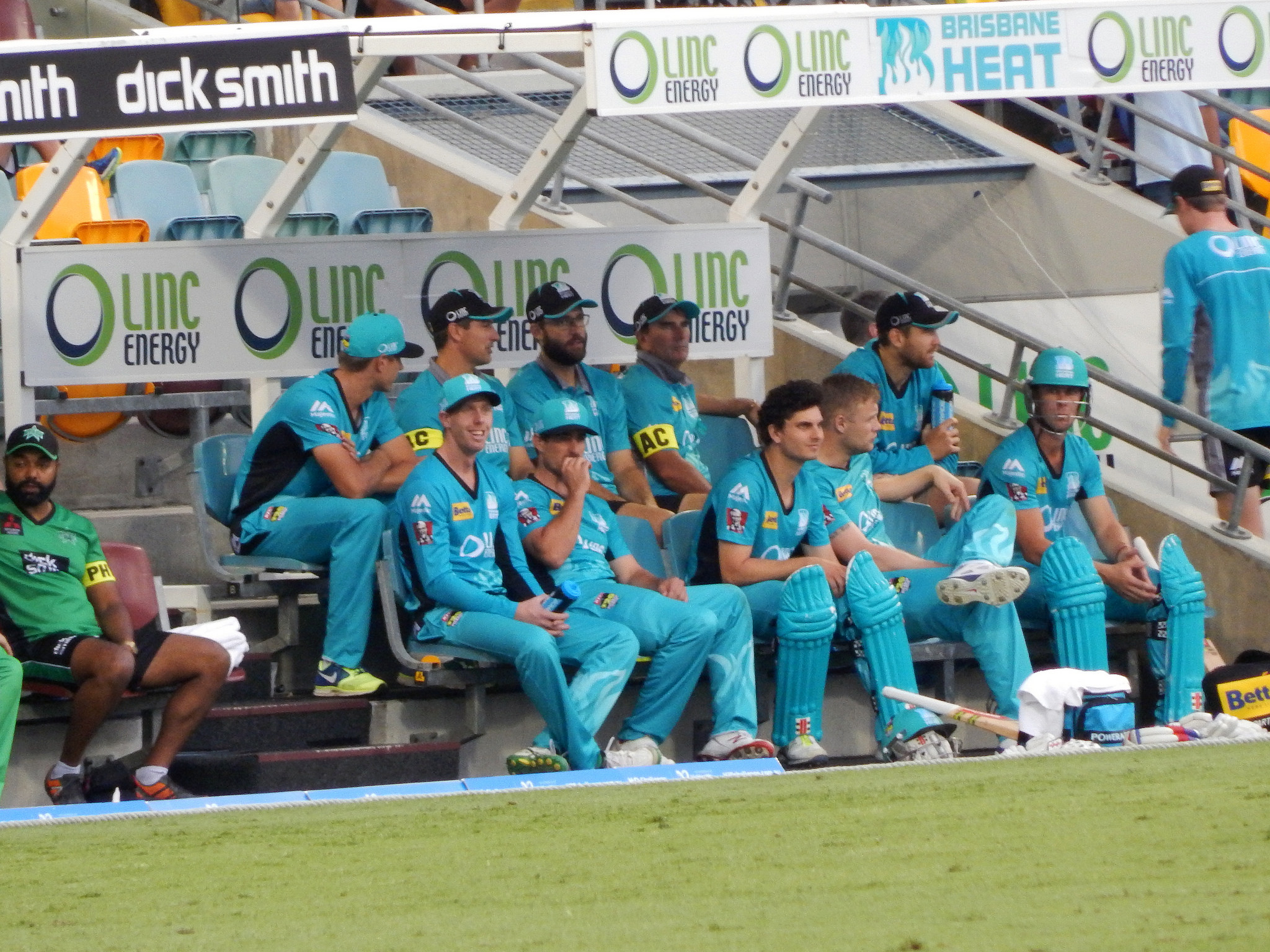
Brisbane Heat players on bench during Heat's innings, 28 December 2014.

The Brisbane Heat are an Australian cricket club who play in the Big Bash League, the national domestic Twenty20 competition. The club was established in 2011 as an inaugural member of the eight-club league. The Big Bash League consists of a regular season and a finals series of the top four teams. This list includes players who have played at least one match for the Heat in the Big Bash League and the Champions League Twenty20.

When the Big Bash League was established in 2011 a salary cap of $1 million was set for every club with a limit of two contracted international players. As of 2013 Brisbane Heat had eighteen full Contracts available, and for the 2020/21 season has nineteen contracted players. Players not contracted to the club may also be named as supplementary players and represent the Heat, and can also be signed on rookie contracts to train with the team.

== List of players ==
Players are listed according to the date of their debut for the Heat. All statistics are for Big Bash League and Champions League Twenty20 only.

- Statistics up to date as of 29 November 2022
- The number to the left of player name represents 'cap'. For players who debuted for club in the same match, player caps are ordered by that of the batting order.
- Currently contracted players names are in bold.
- Hover over column headings for key

Brisbane Heat players						Batting							Bowling					Fielding		Ref
No.	Name	Nat	First	Last	Mat	Runs	HS	Avg	SR	100	50	6's	Wkt	BB	Ave	ER	5wi	C	St	Ref
1	Brendon McCullum	(New Zealand)	2011/12	2018/19	35	920	72	27.88	136.50	0	9	38	–	–	–	–	–	18	0	Ref
2	Matthew Hayden	(Australia)	2011/12	2011/12	7	207	76	29.57	134.42	0	1	6	–	–	–	–	–	4	0	
3	James Hopes	(Australia)	2011/12	2015/16	33	317	49	15.10	106.73	0	0	1	24	3/23	31.50	7.12	0	6	0	
4	**Chris Lynn**	(Australia)	2011/12	2021/22	105	3052	101	33.91	147.79	1	24	181	3	2/15	29.00	7.25	0	31	0	
5	Dan Christian	(Australia)	2011/12	2013/14	33	659	75*	23.54	127.47	0	3	29	29	5/26	25.90	8.08	1	14	0	
6	Andrew Robinson	(Australia)	2011/12	2011/12	7	123	44	17.57	129.47	0	0	4	–	–	–	–	–	2	0	
7	Peter Forrest	(Australia)	2011/12	2015/16	30	554	62*	23.08	106.54	0	3	12	–	–	–	–	–	15	0	
8	Chris Hartley	(Australia)	2011/12	2013/14	18	124	35	20.67	113.76	0	0	0	–	–	–	–	–	11	1	
9	Nick Buchanan	(Australia)	2011/12	2016/17	5	11	8*	3.67	73.33	0	0	1	4	2/42	32.25	10.75	0	3	0	
10	Nathan Hauritz	(Australia)	2011/12	2013/14	24	23	16*	7.67	135.29	0	0	0	9	3/18	51.00	7.91	0	12	0	
11	Alister McDermott	(Australia)	2011/12	2014/15	21	7	5	1.40	43.75	0	0	0	27	4/37	21.19	8.47	0	5	0	
12	Michael Neser	(Australia)	2011/12	2021/22	9	59	30*	19.66	137.20	0	0	2	11	3/31	23.09	8.19	0	3	0	
13	Ryan Harris	(Australia)	2011/12	2013/14	5	40	25*	20.00	114.29	0	0	0	6	2/14	25.17	7.81	0	1	0	
14	Roelof van der Merwe	(South Africa) (Netherlands)	2011/12	2011/12	3	66	36	22.00	140.43	0	0	2	2	1/23	41.50	10.38	0	1	0	
15	Steve Paulsen	(Australia)	2011/12	2011/12	2	35	35*	-	134.62	0	0	1	–	–	–	–	–	0	0	
16	Daniel Vettori	(New Zealand)	2011/12	2014/15	15	74	40	14.80	119.35	0	0	2	10	2/10	42.40	7.31	0	5	0	
17	Chris Swan	(Australia)	2011/12	2011/12	1	-	-	-	-	-	-	-	1	1/16	16.00	4.00	0	0	0	
18	Shane Watson	(Australia)	2012/13	2012/13	1	17	17	17.00	121.43	0	0	2	0	0/17	-	5.67	0	0	0	
19	Luke Pomersbach	(Australia)	2012/13	2013/14	18	547	112*	32.18	134.40	1	3	15	–	–	–	–	–	5	0	
20	Joe Burns	(Australia)	2012/13	2020/21	62	1237	69	25.77	121.75	0	5	48	3	1/8	19.66	7.37	0	27	0	
21	Ben Cutting	(Australia)	2012/13	2019/20	82	1258	81*	22.07	146.11	0	2	78	66	3/24	30.09	8.81	0	33	0	
22	Thisara Perera	(Sri Lanka)	2012/13	2012/13	6	91	38	22.75	178.43	0	0	6	6	3/18	21.67	9.07	0	0	0	
23	Cameron Gannon	(Australia) (United States)	2012/13	2021/22	17	45	23	11.25	83.33	0	0	0	25	4/10	18.80	8.89	0	6	0	
24	Kemar Roach	(Barbados)	2012/13	2013/14	8	0	0	0.00	0.00	0	0	0	5	3/18	38.80	6.89	0	4	0	
25	Chris Sabburg	(Australia)	2012/13	2013/14	8	59	19*	14.75	80.82	0	0	1	0	0/5	-	5.00	0	8	0	
26	Matthew Gale	(Australia)	2013/14	2013/14	2	1	1	1.00	50.00	0	0	0	4	4/10	8.00	6.62	0	1	0	
27	Dom Michael	(Australia) (Samoa)	2013/14	2013/14	1	0	0	0.00	0.00	0	0	0	–	–	–	–	–	0	0	
28	Craig Kieswetter	(England)	2013/14	2013/14	8	192	51	24.00	116.36	0	2	8	–	–	–	–	–	7	2	
29	**Mark Steketee**	(Australia)	2013/14	2022/23	61	169	33	7.68	101.19	0	0	7	78	4/33	24.47	8.90	0	20	0	
30	Ben McDermott	(Australia)	2013/14	2013/14	1	30	30	30.00	115.38	0	0	1	–	–	–	–	–	0	0	
31	Simon Milenko	(Australia)	2014/15	2020/21	6	24	13	4.00	75.00	0	0	1	0	0/4	–	24.00	0	1	0	
32	Nathan Reardon	(Australia)	2014/15	2016/17	18	360	52*	25.71	124.57	0	1	15	–	–	–	–	–	3	0	
33	**Jimmy Peirson**	(Australia)	2014/15	2025/26	88	1279	69*	21.31	124.78	0	4	35	–	–	–	–	–	46	14	
34	Andrew Flintoff	(England)	2014/15	2014/15	7	74	46	14.80	123.33	0	0	2	3	2/41	45.33	11.33	0	3	0	
35	Ryan Duffield	(Australia)	2014/15	2014/15	6	1	1	1.00	33.33	0	0	0	5	3/28	39.40	9.38	0	2	0	
36	Jason Floros	(Australia)	2014/15	2017/18	13	88	42	11.00	104.76	0	0	3	3	2/35	60.33	9.44	0	1	0	
37	Stephen Parry	(England)	2014/15	2014/15	2	2	2*	-	100.00	0	0	0	2	1/16	16.50	8.25	0	3	0	
38	Lendl Simmons	(Trinidad and Tobago)	2015/16	2015/16	8	177	54	22.13	128.26	0	1	7	–	–	–	–	–	5	0	
39	Josh Lalor	(Australia)	2015/16	2019/20	36	93	14	7.75	92.08	0	0	1	42	5/26	23.50	7.77	1	11	0	
40	Samuel Badree	(Trinidad and Tobago)	2015/16	2016/17	13	7	6*	-	140.00	0	0	0	14	5/22	23.86	6.42	1	2	0	
41	Andrew Fekete	(Australia)	2015/16	2015/16	5	1	1*	-	100.00	0	0	0	4	2/44	38.00	11.69	0	0	0	
42	**Sam Heazlett**	(Australia)	2015/16	2021/22	48	793	74*	17.62	124.88	0	2	31	–	–	–	15.00	-	21	0	
43	Luke Feldman	(Australia)	2015/16	2015/16	1	0	0	0	0.00	0	0	0	1	1/53	53.00	13.25	0	1	0	
43	**Mitchell Swepson**	(Australia)	2015/16	2024/25	54	53	11*	4.07	86.88	0	0	0	53	3/14	26.64	7.53	0	14	0	
44	Alex Ross	(Australia)	2016/17	2018/19	27	518	64	28.78	121.03	0	3	16	–	–	–	–	–	10	0	
45	Jack Wildermuth	(Australia)	2016/17	2021/22	24	203	31	12.68	134.43	0	0	13	24	3/23	27.29	8.10	0	4	0	
46	Tymal Mills	(England)	2016/17	2016/17	2	0	0*	-	-	0	0	0	1	1/20	50.00	6.25	0	0	0	
47	**Marnus Labuschagne**	(Australia)	2016/17	2021/22	17	276	49	18.40	112.19	0	0	5	12	3/13	20.83	9.25	0	8	0	
48	Shadab Khan	(Pakistan)	2017/18	2017/18	3	0	0*	-	0.00	0	0	0	6	2/17	14.17	7.08	0	0	0	
49	Brendan Doggett	(Australia)	2017/18	2018/19	15	16	6	4.00	80.00	0	0	0	17	5/35	24.88	8.91	1	6	0	
50	Yasir Shah	(Pakistan)	2017/18	2017/18	7	6	6*	3.00	60.00	0	0	0	5	2/18	36.00	6.43	0	0	0	
51	Matthew Renshaw	(Australia)	2017/18	2025/26	24	549	90*	27.45	130.09	0	4	18	6	1/2	28.83	7.52	0	10	0	
52	**Max Bryant**	(Australia)	2018/19	2021/22	48	1012	81	22.00	132.63	0	4	33	–	–	–	–	–	23	0	
53	James Pattinson	(Australia)	2018/19	2019/20	11	47	27*	9.40	120.51	0	0	3	13	5/33	22.85	7.46	1	2	0	
54	Mujeeb Ur Rahman	(Afghanistan)	2018/19	2021/22	37	52	27	5.77	110.63	0	0	1	37	5/15	24.21	6.20	1	7	0	
55	Jack Prestwidge	(Australia)	2018/19	2019/20	10	14	9*	7.00	127.27	0	0	0	9	2/15	20.00	8.31	0	2	0	
56	**Matthew Kuhnemann**	(Australia)	2018/19	2021/22	18	22	9	7.33	100.00	0	0	0	11	3/47	32.18	7.69	0	6	0	
57	Tom Banton	(England)	2019/20	2019/20	7	223	64	31.86	176.98	0	3	16	–	–	–	–	–	1	0	
58	Zahir Khan	(Afghanistan)	2019/20	2019/20	8	22	19*	-	169.23	0	0	1	8	2/18	23.88	6.59	0	0	0	
59	Ben Laughlin	(Australia)	2019/20	2020/21	21	48	17	16.00	96.00	0	0	1	16	3/31	40.31	8.83	0	14	0	
60	AB de Villiers	(South Africa)	2019/20	2019/20	6	146	71	24.33	140.38	0	1	6	–	–	–	–	–	3	1	
61	Dan Lawrence	(England)	2020/21	2020/21	4	41	20	10.25	93.18	0	0	1	0	0/10	-	8.67	0	1	0	
62	Tom Cooper	(Australia) (Netherlands)	2020/21	2021/22	12	142	32	11.83	123.47	0	0	6	–	–	–	16.00	–	7	0	
63	Jack Wood	(Australia)	2020/21	2021/22	2	14	12	7.00	87.50	0	0	1	2	2/28	20.50	10.25	0	0	0	
64	Xavier Bartlett	(Australia)	2020/21	2021/22	23	154	42*	30.80	124.19	0	0	3	23	4/30	24.65	8.31	0	7	0	
65	Lewis Gregory	(England)	2020/21	2021/22	14	173	36	19.22	132.06	0	0	8	7	3/22	39.28	10.18	0	9	0	
66	**James Bazley**	(Australia)	2020/21	2021/22	19	216	49*	18.00	132.51	0	0	10	15	3/28	27.86	8.06	0	3	0	
67	Joe Denly	(England)	2020/21	2021/22	12	223	50	18.58	107.72	0	1	5	0	0/8	–	7.66	0	1	0	
68	Morne Morkel	(South Africa)	2020/21	2021/22	6	4	2	2.00	36.36	0	0	0	5	2/24	35.20	8.38	0	0	0	
69	**Ben Duckett**	(England)	2021/22	2021/22	12	302	78	25.16	128.51	0	3	6	–	–	–	–	–	9	0	
70	Liam Guthrie	(Australia)	2021/22	2021/22	6	17	11*	8.50	141.66	0	0	1	6	2/32	34.00	9.27	–	3	0	
71	Tom Abell	(England)	2021/22	2021/22	2	9	9	9.00	69.23	0	0	0	–	–	–	–	–	0	0	
72	Jake Lehmann	(Australia)	2021/22	2021/22	3	74	65	24.66	110.44	0	1	0	–	–	–	–	–	2	0	
73	Jack Clayton	(Australia)	2021/22	2021/22	2	21	15	10.50	91.30	0	0	0	–	–	–	–	–	0	0	
74	Fakhar Zaman	(Pakistan)	2021/22	2021/22	1	3	3	3.00	37.50	0	0	0	–	–	–	–	–	1	0	
75	Lachlan Pfeffer	(Australia)	2021/22	2021/22	4	109	69	27.25	114.73	0	1	3	–	–	–	–	–	2	0	
76	Steven McGiffin	(Australia)	2021/22	2021/22	2	20	14*	20.00	86.95	0	0	0	–	–	–	11.50	–	1	0	
77	Will Prestwidge	(Australia)	2021/22	2021/22	3	23	21	11.50	121.05	0	0	2	4	2/34	23.25	9.96	–	0	0	
78	Ronan McDonald	(Australia)	2021/22	2021/22	1	–	–	–	–	–	–	–	1	1/21	21.00	10.50	–	1	0	
79	David Grant	(Australia)	2021/22	2021/22	2	1	1*	–	–	–	–	–	3	3/20	16.00	6.00	–	0	0	
80	Paddy Dooley	(Australia)	2021/22	2021/22	1	4	4*	–	–	–	–	–	–	–	-	6.25	–	0	0	
81	Nathan McSweeney	(Australia)	2021/22	2021/22	3	31	20	10.33	100.00	–	–	–	–	–	-	6.00	–	0	0	
82	**Colin Munro**	New Zealand	2022/23	2025/26																

== Other players ==
Listed below are players who have been associated with the Heat but have not played for the club.

No.	Name	Nat	First	Last	Contract Type	Ref
1	Ryan Broad	(Australia)	2011/12	2011/12	Full Contract	Ref
2	Dale Steyn	(South Africa)	2012/13	2012/13	One-Match Contract	
3	Mitchell Johnson	(Australia)	2012/13	2014/15	Full Contract	
4	Glen Batticciotto	(Australia)	2012/13	2013/14	Supplementary List	
5	Alex Kemp	(Australia)	2012/13	2013/14	Supplementary List	
7	Nick Stevens	(Australia)	2012/13	2013/14	Supplementary List	
8	Asad Vala	(Papua New Guinea)	2013/14	2013/14	Community Rookie	
9	Peter George	(Australia)	2014/15	2014/15	Supplementary List	
10	Michael Philipson	(Australia)	2014/15	2014/15	Supplementary List	
11	Billy Stanlake	(Australia)	2014/15	2014/15	Supplementary List	
12	Scott Walter	(Australia)	2015/16	2015/16	Supplementary List	
13	Charlie Hemphrey	(England)	2015/16	2015/16	Supplementary List	
15	Mitchell English	(Australia)	2015/16	2015/16	Supplementary List	
16	Matthew Willans	(Australia)	2018/19	2021/22	Rookie/Full Contract	
18	Jack Sinfield	(Australia)	2020/21	2020/21	Replacement Player	
19	Connor Sully	(Australia)	2020/21	2021/22	Replacement Player/Full Contract	

== See also ==
- Brisbane Heat
- Big Bash League
- Champions League Twenty20
