= Corey Kelly =

Australian cricketer

Personal information
- Born: 14 December 2000 (age 25); Adelaide, South Australia
- Batting: Right-handed
- Bowling: Right-arm medium
- Role: All-rounder
- Relatives: Thomas Kelly (twin brother)

Domestic team information
- Years: Team
- 2020/21–2021/22: South Australia (squad no. 42)
- Only List A: 2 March 2021 SA v WA

Career statistics
| Competition | LA |
|---|---|
| Matches | 6 |
| Runs scored | 81 |
| Batting average | 13.50 |
| 100s/50s | 0/0 |
| Top score | 27 |
| Balls bowled | 204 |
| Wickets | 2 |
| Bowling average | 107.00 |
| 5 wickets in innings | 0 |
| 10 wickets in match | 0 |
| Best bowling | 1/63 |
| Catches/stumpings | 1/- |
- Source: ESPNCricinfo, 14 May 2022

Corey Kelly (born 14 December 2000) is an Australian cricketer. He made his List A debut for South Australia against Western Australia on 2 March 2021 as part of the 2020–21 Marsh One-Day Cup.

== Personal life ==
Corey Kelly was born on 14 December 2000 in the southern suburbs of Adelaide, South Australia, to Matthew Kelly, a member of the original Adelaide Crows squad for the Australian Football League, and Tina. He is the identical twin brother of fellow cricketer Thomas Kelly, and was born two minutes earlier; they have a younger sister, Lucy. Kelly grew up in a sports-focused family influenced by his father's AFL career. The twins played over 100 games of Australian rules football with Mitcham Hawks Football Club and Norwood Football Club before shifting their focus to cricket, which the elder Kelly had also played.

Kelly has lived for significant periods in the Top End, the far northern region of Australia's Northern Territory; he states an affinity for the region and its lifestyle, being an avid fan of fishing, camping, and outdoors pursuits. He is recognized in the cricket world for his distinctive mullet hairstyle, which was patterned off the dreadlocks of Andrew Symonds and the mullets of Aaron Naughton and Jason Gillespie. The twins state the hairstyle was grown in part to prevent them from being mistaken for one another.

== Career ==
The Kelly brothers began playing cricket at the school level. Before the age of fifteen, Corey was predominantly a batter and Thomas predominantly a bowler; they switched roles after discovering each had a greater affinity for the opposite position. Corey Kelly was selected to appear on Australia's team for the 2020 Under-19 Cricket World Cup in South Africa, while his brother narrowly missed out on being placed on the team. Kelly became a member of the Southern Districts Cricket Club, with which he played multiple games in Darwin.

At the age of 20, the Kelly brothers were signed to the West End Redbacks, South Australia's professional first class cricket team. They became the first twins to play cricket together for South Australia. They played their debut game for the Redbacks in November 2021. Corey and Thomas Kelly are the first identical twins to play first class cricket on the same team in Australia since Kate and Alex Blackwell.
