= Cameron McClure =

Australian cricketer (born 2001)

Personal information
- Born: 25 September 2001 (age 25); Maryborough, Victoria
- Batting: Right-handed
- Bowling: Right-arm fast-medium
- Role: Bowler

Domestic team information
- Years: Team
- 2021/22–: Victoria

Career statistics
Competition	First-class	List A
Matches	11	9
Runs scored	27	7
Batting average	3.00	2.33
100s/50s	0/0	0/0
Top score	9	3
Balls bowled	1,731	424
Wickets	21	11
Bowling average	40.95	38.90
5 wickets in innings	0	0
10 wickets in match	0	0
Best bowling	3/53	3/38
Catches/stumpings	2/–	2/–
- Source: Cricinfo, 25 February 2026

Cameron McClure (born 25 September 2001) is an Australian cricketer who plays domestic cricket for the Victoria cricket team. He made his List A debut for Victoria against Tasmania in the 2021–22 Marsh One-Day Cup, and his first-class debut in the 2021–22 Sheffield Shield against Western Australia.

== Career ==
McClure was selected in the Victoria Country team for the 2019/20 Under 19 National Championships, where across 8 matches he took 10 wickets at an average of 17.80. His best figures of 4/33 came against South Australia. Following the tournament, McClure was called up to the Australia national under-19 cricket team for the 2020 Under-19 Cricket World Cup in South Africa, however he did not play a match.

McClure plays for Essendon in Victorian Premier Cricket. He made his First XI debut in November 2019 against Dandenong, taking 4/52, following it up with 4/77 the following match against Frankston Peninsula.

His performances in the 2021/22 Premier Cricket season, in which he took 18 wickets at an average of 19.11 earned him a List A debut for Victoria in March 2022, as well as a first-class debut for Victoria later in the same month in which he took 2/67 including the wicket of centurion Hilton Cartwright.

McClure was named in the Melbourne Stars squad for 2022–23 Big Bash League season but did not play a match.
