= 2021–22 Marsh One-Day Cup =

Cricket tournament

- Dates: 22 September 2021 – 11 March 2022
- Administrator: Cricket Australia
- Cricket format: List A
- Tournament format: Round-robin tournament
- Host(s): Adelaide; Brisbane; Hobart; Melbourne; Perth; Sydney; Townsville
- Champions: Western Australia (15th title)
- Participants: 6
- Matches: 19
- Player of the series: Matt Renshaw (QLD)
- Most runs: Matt Renshaw (QLD) (377)
- Most wickets: Andrew Tye (WA) (15)

The 2021–22 Marsh One-Day Cup was the 53rd season of the official List A domestic cricket competition played in Australia.

Played during the second summer of the COVID-19 pandemic, the season's fixtures including the final were rescheduled on multiple occasions between the fixture's first release in July 2021 and the final which was ultimately played on 11 March 2022. Lockdowns and border closures impacting Sydney and Melbourne particularly impacted the season.

In the final, Western Australia beat New South Wales by 18 runs to win their 15th one-day title, and the first of three titles won consecutively between 2021–22 and 2023–24.

== Points table ==
Pos	Team	Pld	W	L	T	NR	BP	Ded	Pts	NRR
1	Western Australia	6	4	2	0	0	2	0	18	0.940
2	New South Wales	6	2	0	0	4	1	0	17	2.619
3	Tasmania	6	3	1	0	2	1	0	17	0.800
4	Queensland	6	3	3	0	0	2	0	14	0.119
5	South Australia	6	1	4	0	1	0	0	6	−0.503
6	Victoria	6	1	4	0	1	0	0	6	−2.085

Source: Cricket Australia, ESPN Cricinfo.
- Qualified to the finals

RESULT POINTS:

- Win – 4
- Tie – 2 each
- No Result – 2 each
- Loss – 0
- Bonus Point – 1 (Run rate 1.25 times that of opposition).

== Fixtures ==
22 September 2021
10:00
Scorecard

Western Australia; 6/352 (50 overs)	v	South Australia; 237 (38.3 overs)
Josh Philippe 137 (116); Kane Richardson 2/61 (10 overs)		Alex Carey 128* (106); Jason Behrendorff 4/39 (7.3 overs)

Western Australia won by 78 runs (DLS method)
Karen Rolton Oval, Adelaide
Umpires: Michael Graham-Smith and Sam Nogajski
Player of the match: Josh Philippe (Western Australia)

- South Australia won the toss and elected to field.
- South Australia were set a revised target of 316 runs from 43 overs due to rain.
- Nathan McSweeney (South Australia) made his List A debut.
- Josh Philippe (Western Australia) scored his maiden century in List A cricket.
- Josh Philippe and Mitchell Marsh broke the record for the highest second-wicket partnership in List A cricket for Western Australia, combining for 217 runs.

13 October 2021
11:30
Scorecard

South Australia; 8/391 (48 overs)	v	Queensland; 312 (40.3 overs)
Travis Head 230 (127); Gurinder Sandhu 4/73 (10 overs)		Sam Heazlett 93 (59); Brendan Doggett 4/75 (9 overs)

South Australia won by 67 runs (DLS method)
Karen Rolton Oval, Adelaide
Umpires: Donovan Koch and Shawn Craig
Player of the match: Travis Head (South Australia)

- South Australia won the toss and elected to bat.
- Queensland were set a revised target of 380 runs from 44 overs due to rain.
- Connor Sully (Queensland) made his List A debut.
- Travis Head (South Australia) scored the fastest double century in List A cricket (114 balls), and became the first batsman to score two double centuries in domestic List A competitions in Australia.

15 October 2021
13:00 (D/N)
Scorecard

Western Australia; 218 (47.1 overs)	v	Tasmania; 6/221 (43.5 overs)
Ashton Turner 100 (121); Peter Siddle 3/31 (8.1 overs)		Jordan Silk 90* (99); Andrew Tye 4/39 (10 overs)

Tasmania won by 4 wickets
WACA Ground, Perth
Umpires: Michael Graham-Smith and Sam Nogajski
Player of the match: Jordan Silk (Tasmania)

- Western Australia won the toss and elected to bat.
- Ashton Turner (Western Australia) scored his maiden century in List A cricket.

25 October 2021
10:05
Scorecard

South Australia; 6/193 (35 overs)	v	Western Australia; 4/167 (25.4 overs)
Jake Weatherald 60 (81); Matthew Kelly 2/37 (7 overs)		Shaun Marsh 80* (63); Lloyd Pope 2/35 (5 overs)

Western Australia won by 6 wickets (DLS method)
WACA Ground, Perth
Umpires: Michael Graham-Smith and Nathan Johnstone
Player of the match: Shaun Marsh (Western Australia)

- South Australia won the toss and elected to bat.
- Western Australia were set a revised target of 165 runs from 27 overs due to rain.

1 November 2021
10:05
Scorecard

Queensland; 8/186 (29 overs)	v	Tasmania; 131 (26.4 overs)
Matt Renshaw 76 (62); Peter Siddle 3/30 (6 overs)		Jordan Silk 35 (43); Connor Sully 4/39 (6 overs)

Queensland won by 45 runs (DLS method)
Riverway Stadium, Townsville
Umpires: Donovan Koch and Bruce Oxenford
Player of the match: Matt Renshaw (Queensland)

- Tasmania won the toss and elected to field.
- Tasmania were set a revised target of 177 runs from 29 overs due to rain.
- Ben Manenti (Tasmania) made his List A debut.

12 November 2021
14:35 (D/N)
Scorecard

Victoria	v	New South Wales

Match abandoned
Melbourne Cricket Ground, Melbourne
Umpires: Phillip Gillespie and Tony Wilds

- No toss.
- No play was possible due to rain.

15 November 2021
13:35 (D/N)
Scorecard

Western Australia; 3/361 (50 overs)	v	Queensland; 291 (48.5 overs)
Cameron Bancroft 124* (105); James Bazley 2/73 (10 overs)		Joe Burns 73 (74); Andrew Tye 3/46 (10 overs)

Western Australia won by 70 runs
The Gabba, Brisbane
Umpires: Shawn Craig and Donovan Koch
Player of the match: Cameron Bancroft (Western Australia)

- Western Australia won the toss and elected to bat.

24 November 2021
11:05
Scorecard

New South Wales; 7/344 (50 overs)	v	Victoria; 170 (32.2 overs)
Matthew Gilkes 51 (49); Matthew Short 2/38 (8 overs)		Mackenzie Harvey 55 (72); Tanveer Sangha 4/21 (7.2 overs)

New South Wales won by 174 runs
Sydney Cricket Ground, Sydney
Umpires: Greg Davidson and Ben Treloar
Player of the match: Hayden Kerr (New South Wales)

- New South Wales won the toss and elected to bat.
- Baxter Holt and Tanveer Sangha (New South Wales) both made their List A debuts.

26 November 2021
14:35 (D/N)
Scorecard

Western Australia; 9/294 (50 overs)	v	Tasmania; 5/298 (48.3 overs)
Sam Whiteman 79 (65); Tim David 2/25 (4 overs)		Ben McDermott 133 (140); Liam Guthrie 2/46 (10 overs)

Tasmania won by 5 wickets
Blundstone Arena, Hobart
Umpires: Darren Close and Sam Nogajski
Player of the match: Ben McDermott (Tasmania)

- Tasmania won the toss and elected to field.
- Bradley Hope (Tasmania) made his List A debut.

28 November 2021
10:35
Scorecard

South Australia; 274 (47.1 overs)	v	Queensland; 4/275 (42.1 overs)
Alex Carey 101 (93); Gurinder Sandhu 4/44 (9 overs)		Matt Renshaw 156* (109); Nathan McAndrew 2/54 (7 overs)

Queensland won by 6 wickets
Adelaide Oval, Adelaide
Umpires: Michael Graham-Smith and Donovan Koch
Player of the match: Matt Renshaw (Queensland)

- South Australia won the toss and elected to bat.
- Henry Hunt and Thomas Kelly (South Australia) both made their List A debuts.
- Gurinder Sandhu (Queensland) took a hat-trick, dismissing Thomas Kelly, Nathan McSweeney and Nathan McAndrew in consecutive deliveries. He became the first bowler to take multiple hat-tricks in the history of the Australian domestic limited-overs cricket tournament.

14 February 2022
13:35
Scorecard

Queensland; 7/105 (24.2 overs)	v	New South Wales; 5/101 (21 overs)
Jimmy Peirson 26* (37); Chris Tremain 3/25 (6 overs)		Hayden Kerr 31 (51); Xavier Bartlett 2/17 (4 overs)

New South Wales won by 5 wickets (DLS method)
The Gabba, Brisbane
Umpires: Ben Treloar and Tony Wilds
Player of the match: Oliver Davies (New South Wales)

- New South Wales won the toss and elected to field.
- New South Wales were set a revised target of 101 runs from 24 overs due to rain.
- Lachlan Hearne (New South Wales) made his List A debut.

15 February 2022
10:35
Scorecard

South Australia; 7/259 (50 overs)	v	Victoria; 5/262 (45.4 overs)
Nathan McSweeney 53 (84); Jonathan Merlo 2/23 (6 overs)		Marcus Harris 102* (105); Lloyd Pope 3/51 (9.4 overs)

Victoria won by 5 wickets
Karen Rolton Oval, Adelaide
Umpires: Greg Davidson and David Taylor
Player of the match: Marcus Harris (Victoria)

- South Australia won the toss and elected to bat.
- Liam Scott (South Australia) made his List A debut.

23 February 2022
Scorecard

New South Wales	v	Tasmania

Match abandoned
North Sydney Oval, Sydney
Umpires: Greg Davidson and Troy Penman

- No toss.
- No play was possible due to rain.

23 February 2022
Scorecard

Queensland; 6/285 (50 overs)	v	Victoria; 193 (38.1 overs)
Sam Truloff 80 (85); Henry Thornton 3/45 (10 overs)		Nic Maddinson 52 (64); Gurinder Sandhu 4/42 (9.1 overs)

Queensland won by 92 runs
Junction Oval, Melbourne
Umpires: Phillip Gillespie and Simon Lightbody
Player of the match: Sam Truloff (Queensland)

- Victoria won the toss and elected to field.
- Sam Truloff and Will Prestwidge (Queensland) both made their List A debuts.

25 February 2022
Scorecard

New South Wales	v	Tasmania

Match abandoned
North Sydney Oval, Sydney
Umpires: Gerard Abood and Greg Davidson

- No toss.
- No play was possible due to rain.

6 March 2022
Scorecard

Tasmania; 6/295 (50 overs)	v	Victoria; 156 (40.4 overs)
Matthew Wade 86 (55); Henry Thornton 2/55 (10 overs)		Glenn Maxwell 44 (66); Peter Siddle 4/22 (10 overs)

Tasmania won by 139 runs
Bellerive Oval, Hobart
Umpires: Donovan Koch and Sam Nogajski

- Victoria won the toss and elected to field.
- Cameron McClure (Victoria) made his List A debut.

8 March 2022
Scorecard

New South Wales	v	South Australia

Match abandoned
North Sydney Oval, Sydney
Umpires: Gerard Abood and Tony Wilds

- No toss.
- No play was possible due to rain.

8 March 2022
Scorecard

Victoria; 143 (39.4 overs)	v	Western Australia; 4/145 (27.1 overs)
Aaron Finch 67 (100); Aaron Hardie 3/28 (7.4 overs)		D'Arcy Short 54 (49); Cameron McClure 3/38 (8 overs)

Western Australia won by 6 wickets
Junction Oval, Melbourne
Umpires: Phillip Gillespie and Shawn Craig
Player of the match: D'Arcy Short (Western Australia)

- Western Australia won the toss and elected to field.
- Fergus O'Neill (Victoria) made his List A debut.

== Final ==
11 March 2022
10:35
Scorecard

Western Australia; 9/225 (50 overs)	v	New South Wales; 207 (46.3 overs)
Jhye Richardson 44 (64); Adam Zampa 3/40 (10 overs)		Moises Henriques 43 (75); Andrew Tye 4/30 (8 overs)

Western Australia won by 18 runs
Junction Oval, Melbourne
Umpires: Michael Graham-Smith and Phillip Gillespie
Player of the match: Andrew Tye (Western Australia)

- Western Australia won the toss and elected to bat.

== Statistics ==
=== Most runs ===
Player	Team	Mat	Inns	NO	Runs	Ave	HS	100	50
Matthew Renshaw	Queensland	6	6	1	377	75.4	156*	1	3
Travis Head	South Australia	4	4	0	306	76.5	230	1	0
Josh Philippe	Western Australia	7	7	0	265	37.85	137	1	0
Alex Carey	South Australia	5	5	1	258	64.5	128*	2	0
Ashton Turner	Western Australia	7	7	1	242	40.33	100	1	1

=== Most wickets ===
Player	Team	Mat	Overs	Runs	Wkts	Ave	BBI	SR	4WI
Andrew Tye	Western Australia	7	58.3	285	15	19	4/30	23.4	2
Peter Siddle	Tasmania	4	34.1	134	12	11.16	4/22	17.08	1
Gurinder Sandhu	Queensland	4	32.1	183	12	15.25	4/42	16.08	3
Lloyd Pope	South Australia	4	32.5	211	9	23.44	4/78	21.88	1
James Bazley	Queensland	5	34.4	175	8	21.87	3/12	26	0

== Television coverage ==
Every match of the 2021-22 Marsh Cup was streamed live by Cricket Australia through their website and the CA Live app. Kayo Sports also streamed all 19 matches from the tournament. Fox Cricket broadcast 12 matches, including the final.
