= Matt Patrick =

Matt Patrick or Matthew Patrick may refer to:

- Matt Patrick (footballer) (1919–2005), Scottish footballer
- Matt Patrick (producer) (born 1974), record producer, studio owner and musician
- Matthew Patrick (cricketer) (born 2000), a Trinidadian cricketer
- Matthew Patrick (American politician) (1952–2025), American politician from Massachusetts
- Matthew Patrick (British politician) (born 1987/8), British Member of Parliament
- MatPat (Matthew Patrick, born 1986), American YouTuber
- Matthew Patrick, director of the 1989 film Hider in the House

== See also ==
- Mathew St. Patrick (born 1968), American actor
- Patrick Matthew (1790–1874), Scottish grain merchant
