= Phil Whitticase =

English cricketer (born 1965)

Personal information
- Full name: Philip Whitticase
- Born: 15 March 1965 (age 61); Marston Green, Solihull, Warwickshire, England
- Batting: Right-handed
- Role: Wicket-keeper

Domestic team information
- Years: Team
- 1984–1995: Leicestershire
- FC debut: 7 July 1984 Leicestershire v West Indians
- Last FC: 18 May 1995 Leicestershire v Derbyshire
- LA debut: 5 August 1984 Leicestershire v Kent
- Last LA: 16 May 1995 Leicestershire v Notts

Career statistics
Competition	First-class	List A
Matches	132	111
Runs scored	3,113	793
Batting average	23.23	14.96
100s/50s	1/17	0/0
Top score	114*	45
Catches/stumpings	309/14	99/8
- Source: CricketArchive, 21 April 2023

Philip Whitticase (born 15 March 1965) is a former wicket-keeper and later head coach at Leicestershire County Cricket Club. After 31 years at the club, he left at the end of 2014. He has since worked for the England and Wales Cricket Board as a cricket liaison officer. In January 2020, he was named as one of the three match referees for the 2020 Under-19 Cricket World Cup tournament in South Africa.
