= Andrew Robinson (cricketer) =

Australian cricketer

Personal information
- Full name: Andrew William Robinson
- Born: 10 June 1981 (age 45); Devonport, Tasmania, Australia
- Batting: Right-handed
- Bowling: Right-arm medium
- Source: Cricinfo, 9 October 2020

Andrew Robinson (born 10 June 1981) is an Australian cricketer. He played in twelve first-class and seven List A matches for Queensland between 2010 and 2012. He also played in seven Twenty20 matches for the Brisbane Heat in 2011/12. He is the all-time leading run-scorer for Gold Coast in Queensland Premier Cricket.

== Cricket career ==
Early in his cricket career Robinson played with small clubs Surfers Paradise and Queens but eventually began playing for the Gold Coast in Brisbane Grade Cricket. Robinson was a late bloomer and performed well for Gold Coast over several seasons and developed a reputation as an elite T20 player at club level before making his First-class debut for Queensland at the age of 29 in December 2010. He scored 77 out of an innings total of 213 for Queensland in the first innings. He received a full Queensland State contract for the 2011/12 season and it was suggested he may become Queensland's regular opener alongside Ryan Broad.

Robinson suffered a foot injury in a First-class game early in the 2011/12 season and missed five weeks. He returned to cricket by captaining Gold Coast in December 2011 and as of 2011 he had scored 3442 grade runs at an average of 33.42 which was the most anyone had scored for the club. He signed for the Brisbane Heat for the inaugural 2011/12 season of the Big Bash League and he played in all seven games for the club. He performed well enough to have his State contract renewed with Queensland for 2012/13, and he was also resigned for the Brisbane Heat. He had worked on his wicket keeping over the off-season with Heat fielding coach Wade Seccombe and head coach Darren Lehmann intended to use him as both a top-order batsman and back-up keeper in the squad however he did not play in the 2012/13 season.

Robinson was not selected in the Queensland First-class side after 2012, despite scoring 1509 runs at an average of 100.6 in first-grade cricket for Gold Coast between 2012 and 2014. He did not receive a new Queensland contract ahead of the 2013/14 season and was also not resigned by the Heat, although he did compete in the KFC T20 Challenge series held at Redlands to determine which player would receive the final Heat contract for the upcoming season.

Robinson continued his grade career with Gold Coast after losing his contracts and in the 2014/15 season he passed 10,000 first-grade runs and scored 203 not out which was one short of the Gold Coast first-grade record of 204 scored by Steve Storey. He considered retiring after the 2014/15 season due to feeling his State career was over, but decided to carry on to assist younger Gold Coast players. He scored 546 runs in the 2015/16 grade season, albeit without a century, and retired in March 2016 having scored 11,339 runs and 22 centuries in his 323 matches for the Gold Coast, the record career aggregate, and having been awarded Gold Coast Player of the Season five times. He continued playing in lower grades after his first-grade retirement and as of December 2020 he was both captain and coach of the Gold Coast second-grade team.

== See also ==
- List of Brisbane Heat cricketers
- List of Queensland first-class cricketers
