= Tim Ward (cricketer) =

Australian cricketer (born 1998)

Personal information
- Full name: Timothy Peter Ward
- Born: 16 February 1998 (age 28); Wahroonga, New South Wales, Australia
- Batting: Left-handed
- Role: Opening batsman

Domestic team information
- Years: Team
- 2020/21–present: Tasmania (squad no. 61)
- 2025/26: Hobart Hurricanes

Career statistics
Competition	FC	LA	T20
Matches	49	14	10
Runs scored	2,983	470	200
Batting average	34.28	36.15	22.22
100s/50s	3/22	2/1	0/1
Top score	144	112	90
Catches/stumpings	39/–	3/–	2/–
- Source: Cricinfo, 18 October 2026

Timothy Peter Ward (born 16 February 1998) is an Australian cricketer. He made his first-class debut on 3 April 2021, for Tasmania in the 2020–21 Sheffield Shield season. In October 2021, in the 2021–22 Sheffield Shield season, Ward scored his maiden century in first-class cricket.

Ward was named as the 2022 Bradman Young Cricketer.
