= Lawrence Neil-Smith =

Australian cricketer

Personal information
- Born: 1 June 1999 (age 27)
- Batting: Right-handed
- Bowling: Right-arm fast-medium
- Role: Bowler

Domestic team information
- Years: Team
- 2019/20–present: Tasmania
- 2018/19: Hobart Hurricanes

Career statistics
Competition	FC	LA	T20
Matches	25	1	1
Runs scored	483	11	1
Batting average	16.65	11.00	–
100s/50s	0/2	0/0	0/0
Top score	71*	11	1*
Balls bowled	3,971	30	6
Wickets	71	0	0
Bowling average	32.00	–	–
5 wickets in innings	2	–	–
10 wickets in match	1	–	–
Best bowling	7/58	–	–
Catches/stumpings	5/–	0/–	0/–
- Source: Cricinfo, 26 July 2026

Lawrence Neil-Smith (born 1 June 1999) is an Australian cricketer. He is a right arm fast-medium bowler and batter. In May 2018, he signed a two-year rookie contract with Tasmania ahead of the 2018–19 season. He made his first-class debut on 10 October 2019, for Tasmania in the 2019–20 Sheffield Shield season and was upgraded to a full contract. In September 2018, he was named in the Hobart Hurricanes' squad for the 2018 Abu Dhabi T20 Trophy where he made his Twenty20 debut. He signed with the Sydney Sixers as a replacement player in 2020.

== Domestic career ==
Neil-Smith attended Wilkins Public School in Marrickville and Newington College in Stanmore where he joined the school's 1st XI cricket team aged 14 in the year they went on to win the GPS Premiership. He was in the Cricket NSW pathways program 2012-2018 and was a Cricket NSW Basil Sellers Scholarship recipient in 2017. He was also a talented AFL player and was a member of the Sydney Swans Academy from 2010 to 2015.

He was part of the New South Wales squad at the U19 National Championships in 2016 and 2017 and was the competition's 3rd highest and 2nd highest wicket taker respectively. NSW won the championship in 2017. In 2018 he was selected in a 28-man provisional Australian squad for the U19 Cricket World Cup but missed out on the final squad. He was selected in a U19 Australia squad to play in an ODI series against the U19 Pakistan team in Melbourne. His first grade team in NSW was the Sydney University Cricket Club (cap no. 757) and in Tasmania he plays for Clarence District Cricket Club.

Neil-Smith made his first-class debut against WA at the WACA on 10 October 2019 which ended in a draw. He took 3/81 off 17 overs in the first innings and 2/90 in the second innings. Batting in the first innings he finished 39 not out off 150 balls and the 111-run stand, which he shared with Australian Cricket Captain Tim Paine, who claimed his second first-class century became the highest ninth wicket stand at the WACA.

In October 2021, during the 2021–22 Sheffield Shield season, Neil-Smith took his maiden five-wicket haul in first-class cricket, with 5/43 against Western Australia, he also scored 60 runs and was named man of the match. In season 2022-23 he took his best figures against NSW at the SCG claiming 7/58 and 3/46.
