= Hayden Kerr =

Australian cricketer (born 1996)

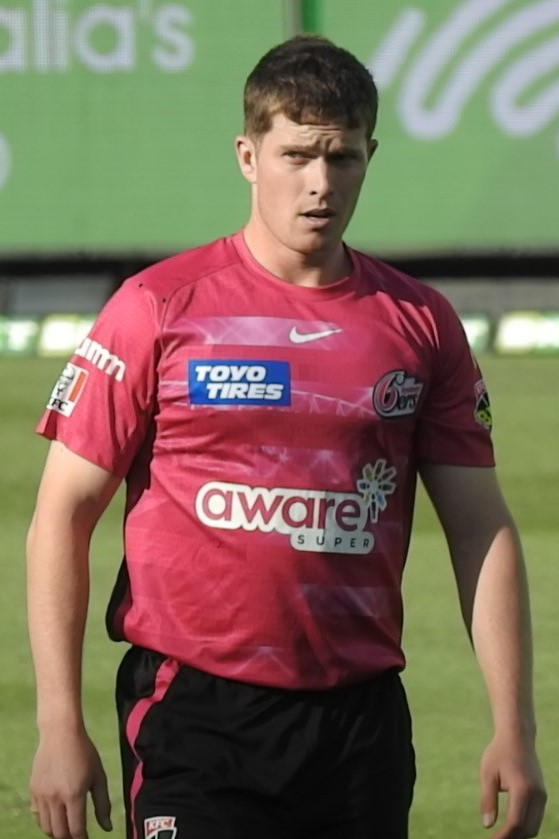
- Kerr playing for Sydney Sixers, January 2023

Personal information
- Full name: Hayden Lewis Kerr
- Born: 10 July 1996 (age 30); Bowral, New South Wales, Australia
- Batting: Right-handed
- Bowling: Left-arm fast-medium
- Role: All-rounder

Domestic team information
- Years: Team
- 2019/20–2024/25: New South Wales (squad no. 50)
- 2019/20–: Sydney Sixers
- 2022: Derbyshire (squad no. 50)
- 2023: Dambulla Aura
- 2025: Glamorgan
- 2025/26–: Queensland

Career statistics
| Competition | FC | LA | T20 |
|---|---|---|---|
| Matches | 15 | 20 | 79 |
| Runs scored | 591 | 249 | 634 |
| Batting average | 25.69 | 13.83 | 19.21 |
| 100s/50s | 0/4 | 0/0 | 0/1 |
| Top score | 88 | 43 | 98* |
| Balls bowled | 1,764 | 903 | 1,426 |
| Wickets | 26 | 29 | 82 |
| Bowling average | 32.15 | 28.68 | 24.29 |
| 5 wickets in innings | 0 | 0 | 0 |
| 10 wickets in match | 0 | 0 | 0 |
| Best bowling | 3/29 | 3/31 | 4/32 |
| Catches/stumpings | 7/– | 8/– | 25/– |
- Source: Cricinfo, 23 October 2026

Hayden Kerr (born 10 July 1996) is an Australian cricketer. He made his List A debut on 20 November 2019, for New South Wales in the 2019–20 Marsh One-Day Cup. He made his Twenty20 debut on 18 December 2019, for the Sydney Sixers in the 2019–20 Big Bash League season. He made his first-class debut on 20 November 2021, for New South Wales in the 2021–22 Sheffield Shield season.

== Domestic career ==
He made his List A debut on 20 November 2019, for New South Wales in the 2019–20 Marsh One-Day Cup. He made his first-class debut on 20 November 2021, for New South Wales in the 2021–22 Sheffield Shield season.

He made his Twenty20 debut for Sydney Sixers against Perth Scorchers in December 2019 during the 2019-20 Big Bash League season. On 26 January 2022 he scored 98 not out against Adelaide Strikers, his first half-century in a T20 match.

In May 2022, he signed with New South Wales. It was his first full contract with this team.

In May 2025, Kerr signed a short-term contract to play for Glamorgan County Cricket Club.

Having been delisted by New South Wales at the end of the 2024–25 season, Kerr was recruited by Queensland for the 2025-26 season.
