= Dilum Sudeera =

Sri Lankan cricketer (born 2000)

Personal information
- Full name: Dilum Sudeera Thilakaratne
- Born: 4 October 2000 (age 26); Galle, Sri Lanka
- Batting: Right-handed
- Bowling: Left-arm Orthodox
- Role: Bowling all-rounder
- Source: Cricinfo, 28 April 2022

Dilum Sudeera (born 4 October 2000) is a Sri Lankan cricketer. He made his first-class debut on 9 May 2019, for Galle Cricket Club in Tier B of the 2018–19 Premier League Tournament. In January 2020, he was named in Sri Lanka's squad for the 2020 Under-19 Cricket World Cup. In March 2021, he was part of the Sinhalese Sports Club team that won the 2020–21 SLC Twenty20 Tournament, the first time they had won the tournament since 2005. He made his List A debut on 3 November 2021, for Tamil Union Cricket and Athletic Club in the 2021–22 Major Clubs Limited Over Tournament.

In April 2022, Sri Lanka Cricket (SLC) named him in the Sri Lanka Emerging Team's squad for their tour to England. In July 2022, he was signed by the Dambulla Giants for the third edition of the Lanka Premier League.
