= Jonathan Figy =

Emirati cricketer

Personal information
- Born: 25 August 2001 (age 25); Dubai, United Arab Emirates
- Batting: Left-handed
- Bowling: Right-arm Medium fast
- Role: Batsman

International information
- National side: United Arab Emirates
- ODI debut (cap 85): 15 December 2019 v Scotland
- Last ODI: 9 January 2020 v Namibia
- T20I debut (cap 92): 12 October 2025 v Nepal
- Last T20I: 13 October 2025 v Oman
- Source: Cricinfo, 12 October 2025

Jonathan Figy (born 25 August 2001) is a cricketer who plays for the United Arab Emirates national cricket team. He is a left-handed batsman.

== Personal life ==
Figy was born in Dubai to Indian parents. He attended Abu Dhabi Indian School, then in 2017 moved to England to attend Winchester College on a cricket scholarship, where he led the school team in runs in both seasons he played. He matriculated to Leeds University in 2019, returning to the UAE in 2023.

== Cricket career ==
In December 2019, Figy was named in the One Day International (ODI) squad for the 2019 United Arab Emirates Tri-Nation Series. He made his ODI debut for the UAE, against Scotland on 15 December 2019, and was one of three university students in the UAE's team. Later the same month, he was named in the UAE's squad for the 2020 Under-19 Cricket World Cup. In the UAE's first match of the tournament, against Canada, he scored an unbeaten 102 runs. It was the first century by a batsman for the United Arab Emirates in a U19 Cricket World Cup match. He was the leading run-scorer for the UAE in the tournament, with 197 runs in six matches.

In May 2023, Figy returned to the UAE national squad for an ODI series against the West Indies.
