= Sam Fanning =

Australian cricketer

Personal information
- Full name: Samuel Thomas Fanning
- Born: 20 October 2000 (age 26); Christchurch, New Zealand
- Batting: Left-handed
- Bowling: Right-arm off break
- Role: Batsman

Domestic team information
- Years: Team
- 2022/23–: Western Australia (squad no. 28)
- 2023/24–: Perth Scorchers (squad no. 20)

Career statistics
Competition	FC	LA	T20
Matches	18	12	6
Runs scored	932	271	142
Batting average	30.06	22.58	23.66
100s/50s	0/8	0/2	0/0
Top score	95	75	41
Catches/stumpings	16/–	7/–	2/–
- Source: Cricinfo, 18 October 2026

Samuel Thomas Fanning (born 20 October 2000) is a New Zealand-born Australian cricketer who plays first-class cricket for the Western Australia cricket team. He made his first-class debut against New South Wales in the 2022–23 Sheffield Shield. He has also represented the Australian under-19 team in both Test and ODI cricket.

== Career ==
Fanning represented Australia at the 2020 Under-19 Cricket World Cup. In the quarter-final against India he top-scored for Australia with 75 runs, but received two demerit points from the ICC for elbowing Akash Singh during the match. He also faced criticism along with some of his teammates for inappropriate comments made on social media during the tournament that appeared to mock non-native English speakers, with a Cricket Australia statement labelling the comments as "having no place in society".

Fanning plays for Perth in Western Australian Premier Cricket and had a breakout season in 2021–22, scoring more First Grade runs than any other batter, and scoring over 1000 runs for the season across all competitions by mid-January. His performance in grade cricket earned a call-up to his state side for the first match of the 2022–23 Sheffield Shield in which he scored a gritty 32 from 161 balls.

Shortly after his first-class debut Fanning played two T20 matches for Western Australia against a touring Indian side as part of the Indian warm-ups for the 2022 T20 World Cup. In the first of these matches Fanning gained attention for scoring a half-century after coming in with his team 4 wickets down for just 12 runs.

=== Pitch tampering ===
In March 2023, Fanning received a four-game ban from the WA Premier Cricket competition, with a further two matches suspended, after being caught on film digging his spikes into the protected area of the pitch during the WA Premier Cricket final in Perth between Perth CC and Bayswater-Morley CC. Furthermore, he will be ineligible for state selection early next season.
