= Sam Truloff =

Australian cricketer (born 1993)

Personal information
- Born: 24 March 1993 (age 33)
- Batting: Right-handed
- Role: Batsman

Career statistics
Competition	First-class	LA
Matches	17	5
Runs scored	486	237
Batting average	16.75	47.40
100s/50s	0/1	0/2
Top score	64	80
Catches/stumpings	20/–	2/–
- Source: ESPNcricinfo, 14 February 2023

Sam Truloff (born 24 March 1993) is an Australian cricketer. He made his first-class debut for Queensland in the 2016–17 Sheffield Shield season on 26 November 2016. He made his List A debut on 23 February 2022, for Queensland in the 2021–22 Marsh One-Day Cup.
