= Dan Mousley =

English cricketer

Personal information
- Full name: Daniel Richard Mousley
- Born: 8 July 2001 (age 25); Birmingham, West Midlands, England
- Batting: Left-handed
- Bowling: Right-arm off break
- Role: Batsman

International information
- National side: England
- ODI debut (cap 277): 31 October 2024 v West Indies
- Last ODI: 6 November 2024 v West Indies
- T20I debut (cap 105): 9 November 2024 v West Indies
- Last T20I: 16 November 2024 v West Indies

Domestic team information
- Years: Team
- 2019–present: Warwickshire (squad no. 80)
- 2021/22: Burgher Recreation Club
- 2022–2025: Birmingham Phoenix
- 2023–2025: MI Emirates
- 2024: Peshawar Zalmi

Career statistics
| Competition | ODI | T20I | FC | T20 |
|---|---|---|---|---|
| Matches | 3 | 4 | 60 | 104 |
| Runs scored | 69 | 8 | 2,567 | 1,883 |
| Batting average | 34.50 | 8.00 | 28.52 | 23.83 |
| 100s/50s | 0/1 | 0/0 | 2/19 | 0/13 |
| Top score | 57 | 8 | 144 | 72* |
| Balls bowled | 12 | 54 | 1,161 | 1,371 |
| Wickets | 0 | 2 | 15 | 76 |
| Bowling average | – | 41.00 | 52.33 | 23.69 |
| 5 wickets in innings | – | 0 | 0 | 0 |
| 10 wickets in match | – | 0 | 0 | 0 |
| Best bowling | – | 2/29 | 3/43 | 4/19 |
| Catches/stumpings | 1/– | 4/– | 41/– | 66/– |
- Source: Cricinfo, 26 September 2026

Daniel Richard Mousley (MOH-zli; born 8 July 2001) is an English cricketer. He made his first-class debut on 13 July 2019, for Warwickshire in the 2019 County Championship. In October 2019, he was named in the England under-19 cricket team's squad for a 50-over tri-series in the Caribbean. In December 2019, he was named in England's squad for the 2020 Under-19 Cricket World Cup. He was the leading run-scorer for England in the tournament, with 241 runs in six matches. He made his Twenty20 debut on 2 September 2020, for the Birmingham Bears in the 2020 T20 Blast.

In October and November 2021, Mousley played for Burgher Recreation Club in the 2021–22 Major Clubs Limited Over Tournament in Sri Lanka. On 24 November 2021, in the match against Nugegoda Sports and Welfare Club, Mousley scored his first century in List A cricket, with 105 runs. In 2023, Mousley was in the squads for MI Emirates in the International League T20 and for Team Abu Dhabi in the Abu Dhabi T10. Mousley is due to play for Peshawar Zalmi in the 2024 Pakistan Super League.
