= Kimani Melius =

West Indian cricketer (born 2001)

Personal information
- Full name: Kimani Seige Melius
- Born: 17 January 2001 (age 25); Saint Lucia
- Source: Cricinfo, 4 October 2018

Kimani Melius (born 17 January 2001) is a West Indian cricketer. He made his List A debut for West Indies B in the 2018–19 Regional Super50 tournament on 3 October 2018. Prior to his List A debut, he was named in the West Indies squad for the 2018 Under-19 Cricket World Cup. He made his first-class debut for the Windward Islands in the 2018–19 Regional Four Day Competition on 21 February 2019.

In October 2019, he was named as the vice-captain of the West Indies Emerging Team for the 2019–20 Regional Super50 tournament. In November 2019, he was named as the captain of the West Indies' squad for the 2020 Under-19 Cricket World Cup. He was the leading run-scorer for the West Indies in the tournament, with 191 runs in six matches.

In July 2020, he was named in the St Lucia Zouks squad for the 2020 Caribbean Premier League (CPL). He made his Twenty20 debut on 23 August 2020, for the St Lucia Zouks in the 2020 CPL.
