= George Hill (cricketer) =

English cricketer (born 2001)

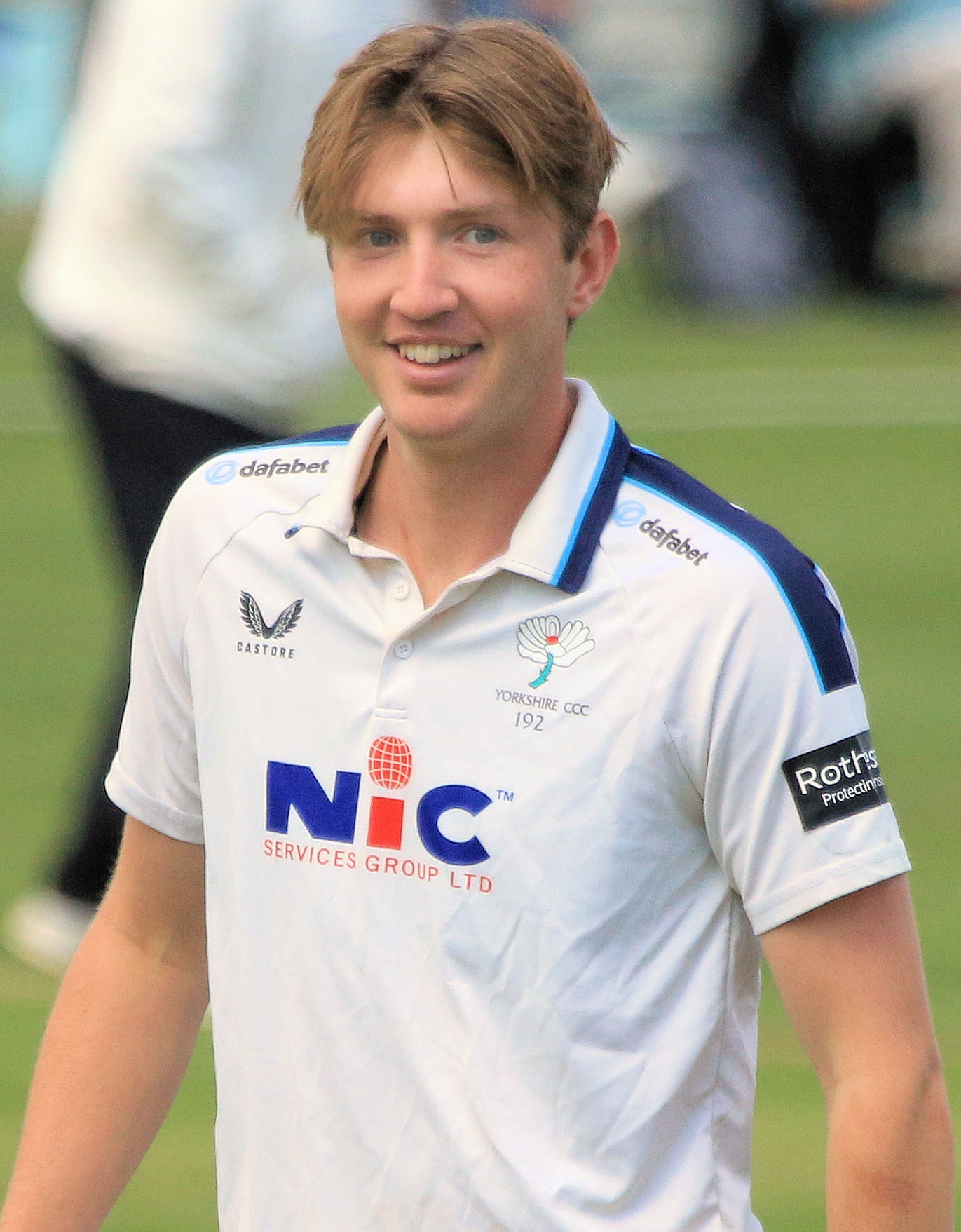
- Hill in 2025

Personal information
- Full name: George Christopher Hindley Hill
- Born: 24 January 2001 (age 25); Keighley, West Yorkshire, England
- Batting: Right-handed
- Bowling: Right-arm medium
- Role: All-rounder

Domestic team information
- Years: Team
- 2020–present: Yorkshire (squad no. 18)
- FC debut: 15 August 2020 Yorkshire v Derbyshire
- LA debut: 22 July 2021 Yorkshire v Surrey

Career statistics
Competition	FC	LA	T20
Matches	77	48	25
Runs scored	3,495	892	147
Batting average	31.20	27.87	13.36
100s/50s	4/23	1/5	0/0
Top score	169*	130	19*
Balls bowled	8,289	1,703	213
Wickets	178	58	8
Bowling average	21.19	23.00	38.00
5 wickets in innings	7	1	0
10 wickets in match	0	0	0
Best bowling	6/26	6/28	2/12
Catches/stumpings	66/–	16/–	9/–
- Source: Cricinfo, 26 September 2026

George Christopher Hindley Hill (born 24 January 2001) is an English cricketer. He made his first-class debut on 15 August 2020, for Yorkshire in the 2020 Bob Willis Trophy. Prior to his first-class debut, Hill was the vice-captain of England's squad at the 2020 Under-19 Cricket World Cup. He made his Twenty20 debut on 30 August 2020, for Yorkshire in the 2020 t20 Blast. He made his List A debut on 22 July 2021, for Yorkshire in the 2021 Royal London One-Day Cup.

In April 2022, in the 2022 County Championship, Hill scored his maiden century in first-class cricket, with an unbeaten 151 against Northamptonshire.

He signed a new contract with Yorkshire in February 2025, tying him into the club until the end of the 2028 season.

In May 2025, Hill was named in the England Lions squad for a two-match series against India A.
