= Lewis Goldsworthy =

English cricketer (born 2001)

Personal information
- Full name: Lewis Peter Goldsworthy
- Born: 8 January 2001 (age 25); Treliske Hospital, England
- Batting: Right-handed
- Bowling: Slow left-arm orthodox
- Role: All-rounder

Domestic team information
- Years: Team
- 2020–present: Somerset (squad no. 44)
- 2024: → Leicestershire (on loan)
- First-class debut: 29 April 2021 Somerset v Middlesex
- List A debut: 25 July 2021 Somerset v Derbyshire

Career statistics
Competition	FC	LA	T20
Matches	38	48	66
Runs scored	1,759	1,901	576
Batting average	30.85	44.20	19.86
100s/50s	3/7	3/11	0/1
Top score	130	115*	67
Balls bowled	720	1,353	1,044
Wickets	7	28	58
Bowling average	62.14	45.25	24.56
5 wickets in innings	0	0	0
10 wickets in match	0	0	0
Best bowling	2/73	4/44	4/13
Catches/stumpings	15/–	15/–	20/–
- Source: Cricinfo, 4 September 2026

Lewis Peter Goldsworthy (born 8 January 2001) is an English cricketer who plays for Somerset.

== Early life ==
Goldsworthy attended Millfield School from Sixth form. Goldsworthy has played for Troon Cricket Club and Camborne Cricket Club in Cornwall alongside his brother Jamie Goldsworthy.

== Career ==
Goldsworthy made his Twenty20 debut on 16 September 2020, for Somerset in the 2020 t20 Blast. Prior to his Twenty20 debut, he was named in England's squad for the 2020 Under-19 Cricket World Cup. He made his first-class debut on 29 April 2021, for Somerset in the 2021 County Championship. He made his List A debut on 25 July 2021, for Somerset in the 2021 Royal London One-Day Cup.

In July 2022, in the 2022 County Championship match against Lancashire, Goldsworthy scored his maiden century in first-class cricket.

In 2024, Goldsworthy joined Leicestershire on loan for the Vitality Blast. In June of that year the loan was extended to include two County Championship matches.
