= Bailey Capel =

Australian cricketer (born 2000)

Personal information
- Full name: Bailey T Capel
- Born: 15 April 2000 (age 26); Henley Beach, South Australia
- Batting: Left-handed
- Role: Opening batsman

Domestic team information
- Years: Team
- 2021/22: South Australia (squad no. 12)

Career statistics
Competition	FC
Matches	1
Runs scored	9
Batting average	4.50
100s/50s	0/0
Top score	8
Catches/stumpings	1/–
- Source: ESPNCricinfo, 26 March 2022

Bailey T Capel (born 15 April 2000) is an Australian cricketer. He plays grade cricket for West Torrens and has played one first-class match for South Australia.

Bailey was the top run-scorer at the Australian under-15 national championships in June 2015. Capel secured a rookie state contract with South Australia for the 2021–22 season. During this season he made his high score in grade cricket of 199, and made his first-class debut for South Australia on 23 March. Capel lost his rookie contract with South Australia at the end of the 2022–23 season.
