= Shafiqullah Ghafari =

Afghan cricketer (born 2001)

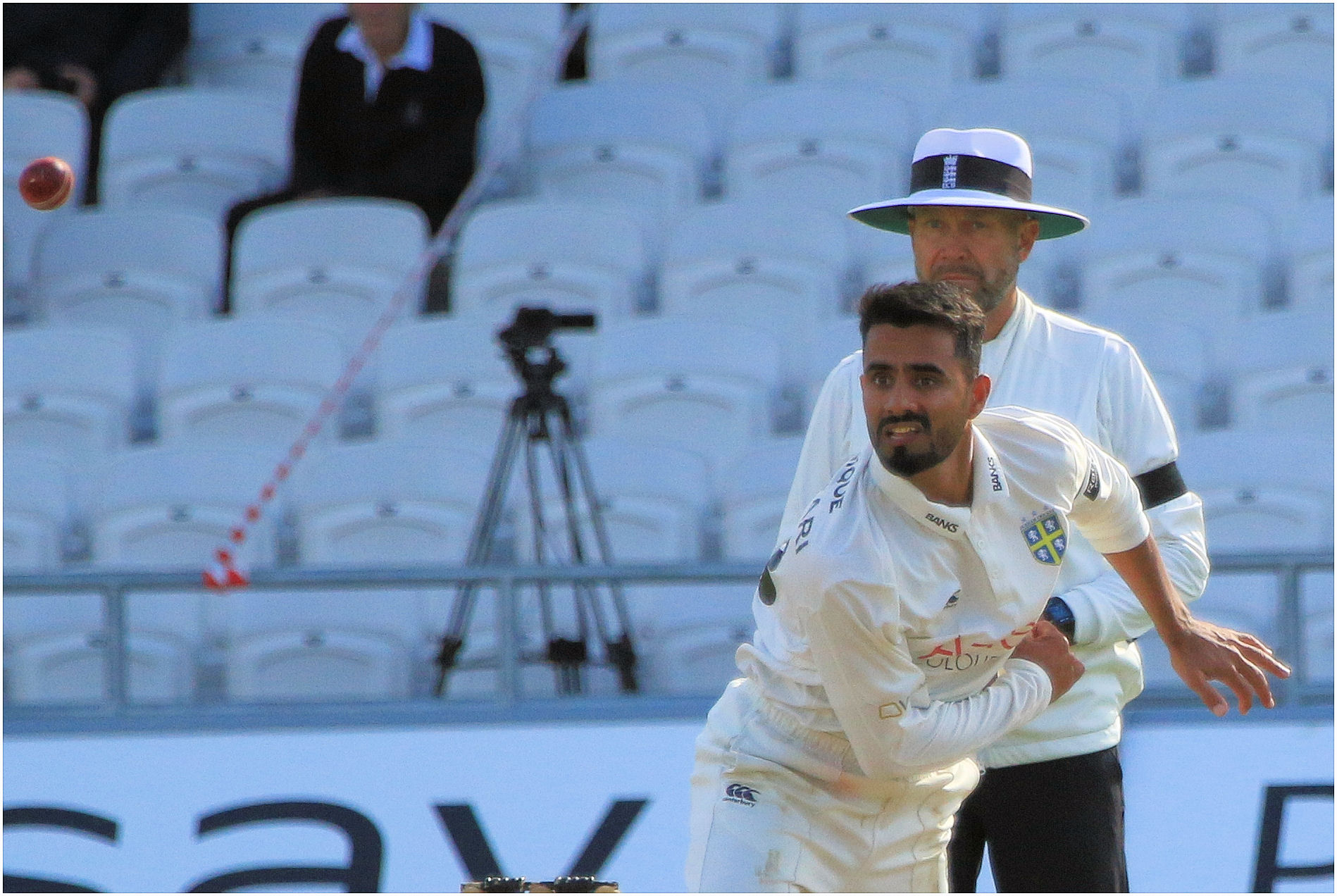
- Ghafari playing for Durham in 2025

Personal information
- Full name: Shafiqullah Ghafari
- Born: 8 October 2001 (age 25); Afghanistan
- Batting: Right-handed
- Bowling: Right-arm leg break

Domestic team information
- Years: Team
- 2023: Sylhet Strikers
- 2025–present: Durham (squad no. 11)

Career statistics
Competition	FC	LA	T20
Matches	15	16	14
Runs scored	312	83	118
Batting average	18.35	10.37	13.11
100s/50s	0/2	0/0	0/1
Top score	69	26	58
Balls bowled	2,238	760	140
Wickets	44	21	3
Bowling average	33.75	33.19	66.66
5 wickets in innings	2	0	0
10 wickets in match	0	0	0
Best bowling	7/44	4/36	2/33
Catches/stumpings	12/–	3/–	8/–
- Source: ESPNcricinfo, 27 September 2026

Shafiqullah Ghafari (born 8 October 2001) is an Afghan cricketer. He made his first-class debut for Kabul Region in the 2019 Ahmad Shah Abdali 4-day Tournament on 4 April 2019. He made his Twenty20 debut on 8 October 2019, for Mis Ainak Knights in the 2019 Shpageeza Cricket League. Afghanistan's squad for the 2020 Under-19 Cricket World Cup also included Ghafari. In the opening fixture of the tournament, he took six wickets for fifteen runs. These were the best figures for an Afghanistan bowler in a U19 World Cup match. He was the leading wicket-taker for Afghanistan in the tournament, with sixteen dismissals in five matches. He made his List A debut on 16 October 2020, for Band-e-Amir Region in the 2020 Ghazi Amanullah Khan Regional One Day Tournament.
