= Sam Young (English cricketer) =

English cricketer (born 2000)

Personal information
- Full name: Samuel Jack Young
- Born: 30 July 2000 (age 26); Plymouth, Devon, England
- Batting: Right-handed
- Bowling: Right-arm off break
- Role: Batsman

Domestic team information
- Years: Team
- 2021: Somerset (squad no. 77)
- List A debut: 25 July 2021 Somerset v Derbyshire

Career statistics
Competition	LA
Matches	8
Runs scored	73
Batting average	10.42
100s/50s	0/0
Top score	25
Catches/stumpings	1/–
- Source: ESPNcricinfo, 12 August 2021

Samuel Jack Young (born 30 July 2000) is an English cricketer. From Radstock, near Bath, and played for Bath Cricket Club. Young attended Millfield School and joined the Somerset Academy in 2016. Young was named in England's squad for the 2020 Under-19 Cricket World Cup. He made his List A debut on 25 July 2021, for Somerset in the 2021 Royal London One-Day Cup. Prior to his Somerset debut, Young has also played minor counties cricket for Dorset and Cornwall.
