= Matthew Kelly (footballer) =

Australian rules footballer

Personal information
- Full name: Matthew Kelly
- Born: 2 July 1971 (age 55)
- Original team: Norwood
- Height: 187 cm (6 ft 2 in)
- Weight: 91 kg (201 lb)

Playing career^{1}
Years	Club	Games (Goals)
1991–1992	Adelaide	2 (0)
- ^{1} Playing statistics correct to the end of 1992.

Matthew Kelly (born 2 July 1971) is a former professional Australian rules footballer who played for the Adelaide Football Club in the Australian Football League (AFL).

Kelly was originally picked up by Collingwood with the 84th selection of the 1989 VFL Draft, but decided to stay with Norwood. His family had some history in South Australian football, with his grandfather Maurie Arbon being a North Adelaide premiership player.

A year later, he was signed by Adelaide as part of their original squad, to enter the AFL in 1991. Kelly, who was troubled by knee injuries for much of his career, was mostly used in the midfield or as a flanker. He had to wait until round 16 of the 1991 season to make his debut, where he had 13 disposals in a loss to Hawthorn at Waverley Park. His only other appearance came at Kardinia Park in 1992, against Geelong.
