= Connor Sully =

Australian cricketer (born 2000)

Personal information
- Born: 24 October 2000 (age 26); Everton Park, Queensland, Australia

Domestic team information
- Years: Team
- 2021/22: Queensland
- Only First-class: 27 October 2021 Queensland v Tasmania
- Only List A: 13 October 2021 Queensland v South Australia

Career statistics
Competition	FC	LA
Matches	1	4
Runs scored	-	26
Batting average	-	8.66
100s/50s	-	0/0
Top score	-	15
Balls bowled	99	168
Wickets	2	6
Bowling average	33.00	35.33
5 wickets in innings	0	0
10 wickets in match	0	0
Best bowling	1/32	4/39
Catches/stumpings	0/–	0/–
- Source: Cricinfo, 24 October 2024

Connor Sully (born 24 October 2000) is an Australian cricketer. He made his List A debut on 13 October 2021, for Queensland in the 2021–22 Marsh One-Day Cup. Prior to his List A debut, he was named in Australia's squad for the 2020 Under-19 Cricket World Cup. He made his first-class debut on 27 October 2021, for Queensland in the 2021–22 Sheffield Shield season.
