= Matthew Patrick (cricketer) =

Trinidadian cricketer (born 2000)

Personal information
- Born: 20 October 2000 (age 26); Trinidad and Tobago
- Source: ESPNcricinfo, 26 January 2017

Matthew Patrick (born 10 October 2000) is a Trinidadian cricketer. He made his List A debut for the West Indies Under-19s in the 2016–17 Regional Super50 on 25 January 2017. In November 2019, he was named in the West Indies' squad for the 2020 Under-19 Cricket World Cup.
