= Matthew Willans =

Australian cricketer (born 2000)

Personal information
- Born: 18 December 2000 (age 25); Auchenflower, Queensland, Australia
- Height: 205 cm (6 ft 9 in)
- Batting: Right-handed
- Bowling: Left-arm fast

Matthew Willans (born 18 December 2000) is an Australian cricket player. He was born in Auchenflower in Queensland in 2000. Willans plays for the Queensland cricket team and the Australian national Under-19 team. as a left-arm pacer. In the Big Bash League, he plays for the Brisbane Heat. At 205 centimetres (6 ft 9 in), he is the tallest player in the league.
