= 2020 Under-19 Cricket World Cup =

Cricket tournament

2020 ICC Under-19 Cricket World Cup
- Dates: 17 January – 9 February 2020
- Administrator: International Cricket Council (ICC)
- Cricket format: Limited-overs (50 overs)
- Tournament format(s): Round-robin and knockout
- Host: South Africa
- Champions: Bangladesh (1st title)
- Runners-up: India
- Participants: 16
- Matches: 48
- Player of the series: (India) Yashasvi Jaiswal
- Most runs: (India) Yashasvi Jaiswal (400)
- Most wickets: (India) Ravi Bishnoi (17)
- Official website: Official website

The 2020 ICC Under-19 Cricket World Cup was an international limited-overs cricket tournament that was held in South Africa from 17 January to 9 February 2020. It was the thirteenth edition of the Under-19 Cricket World Cup, and the second to be held in South Africa after the 1998 event. Sixteen teams took part in the tournament, split into four groups of four. The top two teams from each group advanced to the Super League, with the bottom two teams in each group progressing to the Plate League. India were the defending champions.

In the first Super League semi-final, India beat Pakistan by ten wickets to advance to the final, with Yashasvi Jaiswal scoring an unbeaten century. In the second Super League semi-final, Bangladesh beat New Zealand by six wickets, with Mahmudul Hasan Joy scoring a century. The third-place playoff match between Pakistan and New Zealand was abandoned without a ball being bowled due to rain. Therefore, Pakistan finished in third place, after scoring more points than New Zealand in the group stage of the tournament.

In the final, India batted first and were all out for 177 runs in 47.2 overs. Due to a rain interruption, Bangladesh were set a revised target of 170 runs from 46 overs, per the DLS method, which Bangladesh chased down in 42.1 overs. Bangladesh beat India by three wickets to win the tournament. It was Bangladesh's first championship win in an ICC event at any level.

== Qualification ==
The top eleven full members of the International Cricket Council (ICC) at the 2018 World Cup qualified automatically for the 2020 tournament; Ireland were the only full member to fail to qualify automatically. They were joined by the winners of the five regional qualification tournaments. Fifty teams took part in the qualification pathway matches during 2018 and 2019. The first qualification matches took place in the Europe Division 2 group at various club cricket grounds in Essex and Hertfordshire, England, on 31 July 2018. The final round of qualification fixtures took place in the Netherlands in July & August 2019.

Nigeria became the first team to win their regional qualification group, and qualified for the Under-19 Cricket World Cup for the first time in their history. Japan also qualified for the Under-19 Cricket World Cup for the first time in their history. Japan were scheduled to play Papua New Guinea in their final qualification fixture, but Papua New Guinea forfeited the match. The Papua New Guinea Cricket Board later suspended ten of the players for a year, after bringing the game into disrepute following a shoplifting incident. Canada, Scotland and the United Arab Emirates were the remaining three teams to secure qualification.

Team	Mode of qualification
Afghanistan	ICC Full Member
Australia	ICC Full Member
Bangladesh	ICC Full Member
England	ICC Full Member
India	ICC Full Member
New Zealand	ICC Full Member
Pakistan	ICC Full Member
South Africa	ICC Full Member
Sri Lanka	ICC Full Member
West Indies	ICC Full Member
Zimbabwe	ICC Full Member
Nigeria	Africa Division 1
Canada	Americas Division 1
United Arab Emirates	Asia Division 1
Japan	EAP Division 1
Scotland	Europe Division 1

== Umpires ==
On 7 January 2020, the ICC appointed the officials for the tournament. Along with the sixteen umpires, Graeme Labrooy, Shaid Wadvalla and Phil Whitticase were also named as the match referees.

- Roland Black
- Iknow Chabi
- Anil Chaudhary
- Nigel Duguid
- Ian Gould
- Adrian Holdstock

- Bongani Jele
- Wayne Knights
- Sam Nogajski
- Ahmed Shah Pakteen
- Masudur Rahman

- Leslie Reifer
- Rashid Riaz
- Sharfuddoula
- Raveendra Wimalasiri
- Asif Yaqoob

== Group stage ==
The fixtures for the tournament were confirmed by the ICC on 24 October 2019.

=== Group A ===
Pos	Team	Pld	W	L	T	NR	Pts	NRR
1	India	3	3	0	0	0	6	3.598
2	New Zealand	3	1	1	0	1	3	−0.577
3	Sri Lanka	3	1	2	0	0	2	−0.214
4	Japan	3	0	2	0	1	1	−5.508

18 January 2020
10:00
Scorecard

New Zealand; 195/2 (28.5 overs)	v	Japan
Ollie White 80 (81); Yugandhar Retharekar 1/17 (3 overs)

No result
North West University Oval, Potchefstroom
Umpires: Iknow Chabi (Zim) and Sam Nogajski (Aus)

- Japan won the toss and elected to field.
- Rain during New Zealand's innings prevented any further play.

19 January 2020
10:00
Scorecard

India; 297/4 (50 overs)	v	Sri Lanka; 207 (45.2 overs)
Yashasvi Jaiswal 59 (74); Ashian Daniel 1/39 (10 overs)		Nipun Dananjaya 50 (59); Akash Singh 2/29 (9 overs)

India won by 90 runs
Mangaung Oval, Bloemfontein
Umpires: Ian Gould (Eng) and Ahmed Shah Pakteen (Afg)
Player of the match: Siddhesh Veer (Ind)

- Sri Lanka won the toss and elected to field.

21 January 2020
10:00
Scorecard

Japan; 41 (22.5 overs)	v	India; 42/0 (4.5 overs)
Shu Noguchi 7 (17); Ravi Bishnoi 4/5 (8 overs)		Yashasvi Jaiswal 29* (18)

India won by 10 wickets
Mangaung Oval, Bloemfontein
Umpires: Adrian Holdstock (SA) and Ahmed Shah Pakteen (Afg)
Player of the match: Ravi Bishnoi (Ind)

- India won the toss and elected to field.
- Ravi Bishnoi (Ind) took his four wickets without conceding a run, before finishing his spell with four wickets for five runs from eight overs.

22 January 2020
10:00
Scorecard

Sri Lanka; 242/9 (50 overs)	v	New Zealand; 243/7 (49.5 overs)
Ahan Wickramasinghe 64 (48); Adithya Ashok 3/38 (10 overs)		Rhys Mariu 86 (106); Dilum Sudeera 2/52 (10 overs)

New Zealand won by 3 wickets
Mangaung Oval, Bloemfontein
Umpires: Roland Black (Ire) and Sharfuddoula (Ban)
Player of the match: Beckham Wheeler-Greenall (NZ)

- New Zealand won the toss and elected to field.

24 January 2020
10:00
Scorecard

India; 115/0 (23 overs)	v	New Zealand; 147 (21 overs)
Yashasvi Jaiswal 57* (77)		Rhys Mariu 42 (31); Ravi Bishnoi 4/30 (5 overs)

India won by 44 runs (DLS method)
Mangaung Oval, Bloemfontein
Umpires: Masudur Rahman (Ban) and Leslie Reifer (WI)
Player of the match: Ravi Bishnoi (Ind)

- New Zealand won the toss and elected to field.
- New Zealand were set a revised target of 192 runs from 23 overs due to rain.

25 January 2020
10:00
Scorecard

Japan; 43 (18.3 overs)	v	Sri Lanka; 47/1 (8.3 overs)
Debashish Sahoo 9 (12); Navod Paranavithana 2/2 (2.3 overs)		Ravindu Rasantha 19* (25); Kento Dobell 1/15 (3 overs)

Sri Lanka won by 9 wickets
North West University Oval, Potchefstroom
Umpires: Bongani Jele (SA) and Sharfuddoula (Ban)
Player of the match: Navod Paranavithana (SL)

- Sri Lanka won the toss and elected to field.
- The match was reduced to 22 overs per side due to rain.

=== Group B ===
Pos	Team	Pld	W	L	T	NR	Pts	NRR
1	West Indies	3	3	0	0	0	6	2.340
2	Australia	3	2	1	0	0	4	1.255
3	England	3	1	2	0	0	2	0.837
4	Nigeria	3	0	3	0	0	0	−5.074

18 January 2020
10:00
Scorecard

Australia; 179 (35.4 overs)	v	West Indies; 180/7 (46 overs)
Jake Fraser-McGurk 84 (97); Jayden Seales 4/49 (8 overs)		Nyeem Young 61 (69); Tanveer Sangha 4/30 (10 overs)

West Indies won by 3 wickets
Diamond Oval, Kimberley
Umpires: Rashid Riaz (Pak) and Asif Yaqoob (Pak)
Player of the match: Nyeem Young (WI)

- West Indies won the toss and elected to field.
- The match was reduced to 49 overs per side due to rain.
- This was the first win in eight attempts for the West Indies against Australia in the U19 Cricket World Cup.

20 January 2020
10:00
Scorecard

West Indies; 267/7 (50 overs)	v	England; 184/9 (43.4 overs)
Kevlon Anderson 86* (105); Lewis Goldsworthy 2/28 (10 overs)		Tom Clark 38 (53); Nyeem Young 5/45 (9 overs)

West Indies won by 71 runs (DLS method)
Diamond Oval, Kimberley
Umpires: Wayne Knights (NZ) and Sam Nogajski (Aus)
Player of the match: Nyeem Young (WI)

- England won the toss and elected to field.
- Rain during England's innings prevented any further play.
- Nyeem Young became the first cricketer for the West Indies to score a fifty and take a five wicket haul in the same U19 match.

20 January 2020
10:00
Scorecard

Nigeria; 61 (30.3 overs)	v	Australia; 62/0 (7.4 overs)
Olayinka Olaleye 21 (53); Tanveer Sangha 5/14 (10 overs)		Sam Fanning 30* (26)

Australia won by 10 wickets
Country Club B Field, Kimberley
Umpires: Nigel Duguid (WI) and Masudur Rahman (Ban)
Player of the match: Tanveer Sangha (Aus)

- Nigeria won the toss and elected to bat.

23 January 2020
10:00
Scorecard

England; 252/7 (50 overs)	v	Australia; 253/8 (50 overs)
Ben Charlesworth 82 (100); Connor Sully 2/39 (10 overs)		Mackenzie Harvey 65 (83); Lewis Goldsworthy 2/24 (10 overs)

Australia won by 2 wickets
Diamond Oval, Kimberley
Umpires: Adrian Holdstock (SA) and Asif Yaqoob (Pak)
Player of the match: Connor Sully (Aus)

- Australia won the toss and elected to field.

23 January 2020
10:00
Scorecard

West Indies; 303/8 (50 overs)	v	Nigeria; 57 (21.4 overs)
Matthew Patrick 68 (70); Peter Aho 2/53 (10 overs)		Abdulrahman Jimoh 17 (18); Jayden Seales 4/19 (6 overs)

West Indies won by 246 runs
Country Club B Field, Kimberley
Umpires: Iknow Chabi (Zim) and Ian Gould (Eng)
Player of the match: Matthew Patrick (WI)

- West Indies won the toss and elected to bat.

25 January 2020
10:00
Scorecard

Nigeria; 58 (27.5 overs)	v	England; 64/2 (11 overs)
Sylvester Okpe 16 (39); George Hill 4/12 (7.5 overs)		Sam Young 39* (33); Rasheed Abolarin 1/11 (5 overs)

England won by 8 wickets
Diamond Oval, Kimberley
Umpires: Iknow Chabi (Zim) and Adrian Holdstock (SA)
Player of the match: George Hill (Eng)

- Nigeria won the toss and elected to bat.

=== Group C ===
Pos	Team	Pld	W	L	T	NR	Pts	NRR
1	Bangladesh	3	2	0	0	1	5	5.008
2	Pakistan	3	2	0	0	1	5	2.706
3	Zimbabwe	3	1	2	0	0	2	0.478
4	Scotland	3	0	3	0	0	0	−4.804

18 January 2020
10:00
Scorecard

Zimbabwe; 137/6 (28.1 overs)	v	Bangladesh; 132/1 (11.2 overs)
Tadiwanashe Marumani 31 (33); Rakibul Hasan 1/19 (5 overs)		Parvez Hossain Emon 58* (33); Dion Myers 1/26 (2.3 overs)

Bangladesh won by 9 wickets (DLS method)
JB Marks Oval, Potchefstroom
Umpires: Roland Black (Ire) and Leslie Reifer (WI)
Player of the match: Parvez Hossain Emon (Ban)

- Bangladesh won the toss and elected to field.
- Bangladesh were set a revised target of 130 runs from 22 overs due to rain.

19 January 2020
10:00
Scorecard

Scotland; 75 (23.5 overs)	v	Pakistan; 77/3 (11.4 overs)
Uzzair Shah 20 (36); Mohammad Wasim 5/12 (7.5 overs)		Irfan Khan 38* (37); Liam Naylor 1/12 (3 overs)

Pakistan won by 7 wickets
North West University Oval, Potchefstroom
Umpires: Anil Chaudhary (Ind) and Bongani Jele (SA)
Player of the match: Mohammad Wasim (Pak)

- Scotland won the toss and elected to bat.

21 January 2020
10:00
Scorecard

Scotland; 89 (30.3 overs)	v	Bangladesh; 91/3 (16.4 overs)
Uzzair Shah 28 (48); Rakibul Hasan 4/20 (5.3 overs)		Mahmudul Hasan Joy 35* (48); Sean Fischer-Keogh 3/27 (4 overs)

Bangladesh won by 7 wickets
Witrand Oval, Potchefstroom
Umpires: Anil Chaudhary (Ind) and Leslie Reifer (WI)
Player of the match: Rakibul Hasan (Ban)

- Scotland won the toss and elected to bat.
- Rakibul Hasan (Ban) took a hat-trick.

22 January 2020
10:00
Scorecard

Pakistan; 294/9 (50 overs)	v	Zimbabwe; 256 (46.3 overs)
Mohammad Haris 81 (48); Dylan Grant 3/46 (7 overs)		Milton Shumba 58 (82); Tahir Hussain 3/42 (7.3 overs)

Pakistan won by 38 runs
Witrand Oval, Potchefstroom
Umpires: Nigel Duguid (WI) and Raveendra Wimalasiri (SL)
Player of the match: Mohammad Haris (Pak)

- Zimbabwe won the toss and elected to field.

24 January 2020
10:00
Scorecard

Bangladesh; 106/9 (25 overs)	v	Pakistan
Tanzid Hasan 34 (35); Mohammad Amir Khan 4/30 (6 overs)

No result
JB Marks Oval, Potchefstroom
Umpires: Bongani Jele (SA) and Raveendra Wimalasiri (SL)

- Pakistan won the toss and elected to field.
- Rain during Bangladesh's innings prevented any further play.

25 January 2020
10:00
Scorecard

Scotland; 140 (37.2 overs)	v	Zimbabwe; 146/2 (17.1 overs)
Kess Sajjad 68 (71); Sakhumuzi Ndlela 4/27 (4 overs)		Tadiwanashe Marumani 85 (55); Jasper Davidson 1/17 (3 overs)

Zimbabwe won by 8 wickets
Witrand Oval, Potchefstroom
Umpires: Roland Black (Ire) and Ian Gould (Eng)
Player of the match: Tadiwanashe Marumani (Zim)

- Zimbabwe won the toss and elected to field.
- The match was reduced to 42 overs per side due to rain.

=== Group D ===
Pos	Team	Pld	W	L	T	NR	Pts	NRR
1	Afghanistan	3	2	0	0	1	5	2.927
2	South Africa	3	2	1	0	0	4	0.488
3	United Arab Emirates	3	1	2	0	0	2	−1.104
4	Canada	3	0	2	0	1	1	−2.253

17 January 2020
10:00
Scorecard

South Africa; 129 (29.1 overs)	v	Afghanistan; 130/3 (25 overs)
Bryce Parsons 40 (42); Shafiqullah Ghafari 6/15 (9.1 overs)		Imran Mir 57 (48); Achille Cloete 2/20 (4 overs)

Afghanistan won by 7 wickets
Diamond Oval, Kimberley
Umpires: Wayne Knights (NZ) and Raveendra Wimalasiri (SL)
Player of the match: Shafiqullah Ghafari (Afg)

- South Africa won the toss and elected to bat.
- Shafiqullah Ghafari took the best figures for a Afghanistan bowler in a U19 World Cup match.

18 January 2020
10:00
Scorecard

Canada; 231/8 (50 overs)	v	United Arab Emirates; 232/2 (38.4 overs)
Mihir Patel 90 (105); Sanchit Sharma 3/42 (10 overs)		Jonathan Figy 102* (101); Muhammad Kamal 1/27 (4 overs)

United Arab Emirates won by 8 wickets
Mangaung Oval, Bloemfontein
Umpires: Ahmed Shah Pakteen (Afg) and Sharfuddoula (Ban)
Player of the match: Jonathan Figy (UAE)

- United Arab Emirates won the toss and elected to field.
- Jonathan Figy scored the first century by a batsman for the United Arab Emirates in a U19 Cricket World Cup match.

22 January 2020
10:00
Scorecard

South Africa; 349/8 (50 overs)	v	Canada; 199 (41.1 overs)
Bryce Parsons 121 (90); Akhil Kumar 4/56 (10 overs)		Benjamin Calitz 62 (77); Tiaan van Vuuren 2/24 (7 overs)

South Africa won by 150 runs
JB Marks Oval, Potchefstroom
Umpires: Wayne Knights (NZ) and Rashid Riaz (Pak)
Player of the match: Bryce Parsons (SA)

- Canada won the toss and elected to field.

22 January 2020
10:00
Scorecard

Afghanistan; 265/6 (50 overs)	v	United Arab Emirates; 105 (32.4 overs)
Ibrahim Zadran 87 (121); Palaniapan Meiyappan 2/49 (10 overs)		Aryan Lakra 28 (53); Shafiqullah Ghafari 5/23 (8 overs)

Afghanistan won by 160 runs
North West University Oval, Potchefstroom
Umpires: Sam Nogajski (Aus) Masudur Rahman (Ban)
Player of the match: Shafiqullah Ghafari (Afg)

- Afghanistan won the toss and elected to bat.

24 January 2020
10:00
Scorecard

Afghanistan	v	Canada

Match abandoned
Ibbies Oval, Potchefstroom
Umpires: Anil Chaudhary (Ind) and Rashid Riaz (Pak)

- No toss.
- No play was possible due to rain.

25 January 2020
10:00
Scorecard

South Africa; 299/8 (50 overs)	v	United Arab Emirates; 112/3 (23.5 overs)
Luke Beaufort 85 (104); Aryan Lakra 3/48 (10 overs)		Jonathan Figy 36* (59); Pheko Moletsane 1/14 (2 overs)

South Africa won by 23 runs (DLS method)
Mangaung Oval, Bloemfontein
Umpires: Nigel Duguid (WI) and Asif Yaqoob (Pak)
Player of the match: Bryce Parsons (SA)

- South Africa won the toss and elected to bat.
- Rain during the United Arab Emirates' innings prevented any further play.

== Plate League ==
13th-place playoff
D3	United Arab Emirates	174 (44.1)
D4	Canada	179/6 (42.2)
15th-place playoff
B4	Nigeria	116/2 (22.4)
A4	Japan	115 (42)

Plate playoff semi-finals
B4	Nigeria	145 (46.4)
D3	United Arab Emirates	146/3 (29.2)
A4	Japan	118 (29.4)
D4	Canada	300/7 (50)

Plate quarter-finals
A3	Sri Lanka	306/7 (50)
B4	Nigeria	73 (17.3)
D3	United Arab Emirates	249 (49)
C4	Scotland	250/3 (44.3)
B3	England	94/1 (11.3)
A4	Japan	93 (38.4)
C3	Zimbabwe	271/7 (50)
D4	Canada	176 (47.3)

Plate semi-finals
A3	Sri Lanka	277/6 (50)
C4	Scotland	149/8 (40)
B3	England	286/9 (50)
C3	Zimbabwe	211 (40.5)

Plate final
A3	Sri Lanka	127 (31)
B3	England	279/7 (50)
11th-place playoff
C4	Scotland	182 (33.4)
C3	Zimbabwe	354/8 (50)

=== Plate quarter-finals ===
27 January 2020
10:00
Scorecard

Sri Lanka; 306/7 (50 overs)	v	Nigeria; 73 (17.3 overs)
Ravindu Rasantha 102* (111); Rasheed Abolarin 2/50 (10 overs)		Abdulrahman Jimoh 15 (20); Dilshan Madushanka 5/36 (7.3 overs)

Sri Lanka won by 233 runs
Ibbies Oval, Potchefstroom
Umpires: Ian Gould (Eng) and Rashid Riaz (Pak)
Player of the match: Ravindu Rasantha (SL)

- Nigeria won the toss and elected to field.

27 January 2020
10:00
Scorecard

Japan; 93 (38.4 overs)	v	England; 94/1 (11.3 overs)
Debashish Sahoo 24 (75); Scott Currie 3/15 (7 overs)		Dan Mousley 57* (36); Max Clements 1/17 (3 overs)

England won by 9 wickets
Witrand Oval, Potchefstroom
Umpires: Bongani Jele (SA) and Ahmed Shah Pakteen (Afg)
Player of the match: Dan Mousley (Eng)

- England won the toss and elected to field.

28 January 2020
10:00
Scorecard

Zimbabwe; 271/7 (50 overs)	v	Canada; 176 (47.3 overs)
Emmanuel Bawa 105* (95); Akhil Kumar 3/63 (10 overs)		Harmanjeet Bedi 26* (62); Sakhumuzi Ndlela 2/34 (9 overs)

Zimbabwe won by 95 runs
Ibbies Oval, Potchefstroom
Umpires: Masudur Rahman (Ban) and Leslie Reifer (WI)
Player of the match: Emmanuel Bawa (Zim)

- Zimbabwe won the toss and elected to bat.

28 January 2020
10:00
Scorecard

United Arab Emirates; 249 (49 overs)	v	Scotland; 250/3 (44.3 overs)
Osama Hassan 81 (68); Daniel Cairns 4/32 (7 overs)		Uzzair Shah 71 (77); Palaniapan Meiyappan 1/52 (10 overs)

Scotland won by 7 wickets
Witrand Oval, Potchefstroom
Umpires: Iknow Chabi (Zim) and Nigel Duguid (WI)
Player of the match: Uzzair Shah (Sco)

- Scotland won the toss and elected to field.

=== Plate playoff semi-finals ===
30 January 2020
10:00
Scorecard

Nigeria; 145 (46.4 overs)	v	United Arab Emirates; 146/3 (29.2 overs)
Olayinka Olaleye 31 (50); Rishabh Mukherjee 4/35 (10 overs)		Alishan Sharafu 59* (60); Ifeanyichukwu Uboh 2/23 (3 overs)

United Arab Emirates won by 7 wickets
North West University Oval, Potchefstroom
Umpires: Adrian Holdstock (SA) and Raveendra Wimalasiri (SL)
Player of the match: Alishan Sharafu (UAE)

- United Arab Emirates won the toss and elected to field.

30 January 2020
10:00
Scorecard

Canada; 300/7 (50 overs)	v	Japan; 118 (29.4 overs)
Nicholas Manohar 101 (102); Tushar Chaturvedi 2/47 (6 overs)		Neel Date 59 (75); Akhil Kumar 6/46 (10 overs)

Canada won by 182 runs
Ibbies Oval, Potchefstroom
Umpires: Rashid Riaz (Pak) and Asif Yaqoob (Pak)
Player of the match: Akhil Kumar (Can)

- Japan won the toss and elected to field.

=== Plate semi-finals ===
30 January 2020
10:00
Scorecard

Sri Lanka; 277/6 (50 overs)	v	Scotland; 149/8 (40 overs)
Nipun Dananjaya 66 (69); Jasper Davidson 2/31 (6 overs)		Angus Guy 31 (72); Chamindu Wijesinghe 3/31 (9 overs)

Sri Lanka won by 97 runs (DLS method)
North West University Oval, Potchefstroom
Umpires: Ian Gould (Eng) and Ahmed Shah Pakteen (Afg)
Player of the match: Nipun Dananjaya (SL)

- Sri Lanka won the toss and elected to bat.
- Rain during Scotland's innings prevented any further play.

31 January 2020
10:00
Scorecard

England; 286/9 (50 overs)	v	Zimbabwe; 211 (40.5 overs)
George Hill 90 (93); Wesley Madhevere 4/42 (10 overs)		Taurayi Tugwete 58 (65); George Balderson 3/29 (3.5 overs)

England won by 75 runs
Diamond Oval, Kimberley
Umpires: Nigel Duguid (WI) and Masudur Rahman (Ban)

- England won the toss and elected to bat.

== Super League ==
5th-place playoff
B2	Australia	319/8 (50)
B1	West Indies	62/1 (12.3)
7th-place playoff
D1	Afghanistan	158/5 (40.2)
D2	South Africa	154 (39.3)

Super League playoff semi-finals
B2	Australia	195/6 (49.5)
D1	Afghanistan	191/7 (50)
B1	West Indies	147/6 (41.4)
D2	South Africa	143 (38.2)

Super League quarter-finals
A1	India	233/9 (50)
B2	Australia	159 (43.3)
D1	Afghanistan	189 (49.1)
C2	Pakistan	190/4 (41.1)
B1	West Indies	238 (47.5)
A2	New Zealand	239/8 (49.4)
C1	Bangladesh	261/5 (50)
D2	South Africa	157 (42.3)

Super League semi-finals
A1	India	176/0 (35.2)
C2	Pakistan	172 (43.1)
A2	New Zealand	211/8 (50)
C1	Bangladesh	215/4 (44.1)

Final
A1	India	177 (47.2)
C1	Bangladesh	170/7 (42.1)
3rd-place playoff
C2	Pakistan
A2	New Zealand

=== Super League quarter-finals ===
28 January 2020
10:00
Scorecard

India; 233/9 (50 overs)	v	Australia; 159 (43.3 overs)
Yashasvi Jaiswal 62 (82); Todd Murphy 2/40 (10 overs)		Sam Fanning 75 (127); Kartik Tyagi 4/24 (8 overs)

India won by 74 runs
JB Marks Oval, Potchefstroom
Umpires: Adrian Holdstock (SA) and Sharfuddoula (Ban)
Player of the match: Kartik Tyagi (Ind)

- Australia won the toss and elected to field.

29 January 2020
10:00
Scorecard

West Indies; 238 (47.5 overs)	v	New Zealand; 239/8 (49.4 overs)
Kirk McKenzie 99 (104); Kris Clarke 4/25 (7.5 overs)		Kris Clarke 46* (42); Ashmead Nedd 3/33 (10 overs)

New Zealand won by 2 wickets
Willowmoore Park, Benoni
Umpires: Roland Black (Ire) and Sam Nogajski (Aus)
Player of the match: Kris Clarke (NZ)

- West Indies won the toss and elected to bat.

30 January 2020
10:00
Scorecard

Bangladesh; 261/5 (50 overs)	v	South Africa; 157 (42.3 overs)
Tanzid Hasan 80 (84); Pheko Moletsane 2/41 (10 overs)		Luke Beaufort 60 (91); Rakibul Hasan 5/19 (9.3 overs)

Bangladesh won by 104 runs
JB Marks Oval, Potchefstroom
Umpires: Anil Chaudhary (Ind) and Wayne Knights (NZ)
Player of the match: Rakibul Hasan (Ban)

- South Africa won the toss and elected to field.

31 January 2020
10:00
Scorecard

Afghanistan; 189 (49.1 overs)	v	Pakistan; 190/4 (41.1 overs)
Farhan Zakhil 40 (55); Mohammad Amir Khan 3/58 (10 overs)		Mohammad Huraira 64 (76); Noor Ahmad 2/32 (10 overs)

Pakistan won by 6 wickets
Willowmoore Park, Benoni
Umpires: Sam Nogajski (Aus) and Sharfuddoula (Ban)
Player of the match: Mohammad Huraira (Pak)

- Afghanistan won the toss and elected to bat.

=== Super League playoff semi-finals ===
1 February 2020
10:00
Scorecard

South Africa; 143 (38.2 overs)	v	West Indies; 147/6 (41.4 overs)
Levert Manje 43 (63); Matthew Patrick 2/12 (6.2 overs)		Kimani Melius 29 (30); Bryce Parsons 2/23 (10 overs)

West Indies won by 4 wickets
JB Marks Oval, Potchefstroom
Umpires: Roland Black (Ire) and Anil Chaudhary (Ind)
Player of the match: Matthew Patrick (WI)

- South Africa won the toss and elected to bat.

2 February 2020
10:00
Scorecard

Afghanistan; 191/7 (50 overs)	v	Australia; 195/6 (49.5 overs)
Farhan Zakhil 91* (132); Tanveer Sangha 4/41 (10 overs)		Sam Fanning 62 (107); Abdul Rahman 3/51 (10 overs)

Australia won by 4 wickets
North West University Oval, Potchefstroom
Umpires: Adrian Holdstock (SA) and Raveendra Wimalasiri (SL)
Player of the match: Tanveer Sangha (Aus)

- Afghanistan won the toss and elected to bat.

=== Super League semi-finals ===
4 February 2020
10:00
Scorecard

Pakistan; 172 (43.1 overs)	v	India; 176/0 (35.2 overs)
Rohail Nazir 62 (102); Sushant Mishra 3/28 (8.1 overs)		Yashasvi Jaiswal 105* (113)

India won by 10 wickets
JB Marks Oval, Potchefstroom
Umpires: Roland Black (Ire) and Adrian Holdstock (SA)
Player of the match: Yashasvi Jaiswal (Ind)

- Pakistan won the toss and elected to bat.

6 February 2020
10:00
Scorecard

New Zealand; 211/8 (50 overs)	v	Bangladesh; 215/4 (44.1 overs)
Beckham Wheeler-Greenall 75* (83); Shoriful Islam 3/45 (10 overs)		Mahmudul Hasan Joy 100 (127); David Hancock 1/31 (7 overs)

Bangladesh won by 6 wickets
JB Marks Oval, Potchefstroom
Umpires: Roland Black (Ire) and Sam Nogajski (Aus)
Player of the match: Mahmudul Hasan Joy (Ban)

- Bangladesh won the toss and elected to field.

== Placement matches ==
=== 15th-place playoff ===
1 February 2020
10:00
Scorecard

Japan; 115 (42 overs)	v	Nigeria; 116/2 (22.4 overs)
Shu Noguchi 31 (77); Ifeanyichukwu Uboh 5/23 (8 overs)		Sulaimon Runsewe 56* (71); Ashley Thurgate 2/26 (6 overs)

Nigeria won by 8 wickets
Ibbies Oval, Potchefstroom
Umpires: Iknow Chabi (Zim) and Asif Yaqoob (Pak)
Player of the match: Ifeanyichukwu Uboh (Ngr)

- Japan won the toss and elected to bat.

=== 13th-place playoff ===
1 February 2020
10:00
Scorecard

United Arab Emirates; 174 (44.1 overs)	v	Canada; 179/6 (42.2 overs)
Alishan Sharafu 65* (73); Udaybir Walia 3/16 (3.1 overs)		Udaybir Walia 42* (53); Rishabh Mukherjee 4/62 (10 overs)

Canada won by 4 wickets
Witrand Oval, Potchefstroom
Umpires: Bongani Jele (SA) and Leslie Reifer (WI)
Player of the match: Udaybir Walia (Can)

- Canada won the toss and elected to field.

=== 11th-place playoff ===
2 February 2020
10:00
Scorecard

Zimbabwe; 354/8 (50 overs)	v	Scotland; 182 (33.4 overs)
Tadiwanashe Marumani 90 (92); Ben Davidson 2/44 (6 overs)		Daniel Cairns 58 (80); Privilege Chesa 5/49 (10 overs)

Zimbabwe won by 172 runs
Diamond Oval, Kimberley
Umpires: Nigel Duguid (WI) and Wayne Knights (NZ)
Player of the match: Privilege Chesa (Zim)

- Zimbabwe won the toss and elected to bat.

=== 9th-place playoff (Plate Final) ===
3 February 2020
10:00
Scorecard

England; 279/7 (50 overs)	v	Sri Lanka; 127 (31 overs)
Dan Mousley 111 (135); Dilum Sudeera 2/39 (9 overs)		Ravindu Rasantha 66 (81); Lewis Goldsworthy 5/21 (7 overs)

England won by 152 runs
Willowmoore Park, Benoni
Umpires: Bongani Jele (SA) and Ahmed Shah Pakteen (Afg)
Player of the match: Dan Mousley (Eng)

- Sri Lanka won the toss and elected to field.

=== 7th-place playoff ===
5 February 2020
10:00
Scorecard

South Africa; 154 (39.3 overs)	v	Afghanistan; 158/5 (40.2 overs)
Jonathan Bird 34 (37); Shafiqullah Ghafari 3/15 (8 overs)		Ibrahim Zadran 73* (113); Odirile Modimokoane 2/37 (10 overs)

Afghanistan won by 5 wickets
Willowmoore Park, Benoni
Umpires: Anil Chaudhary (Ind) and Ian Gould (Eng)
Player of the match: Shafiqullah Ghafari (Afg)

- South Africa won the toss and elected to bat.

=== 5th-place playoff ===
7 February 2020
10:00
Scorecard

Australia; 319/8 (50 overs)	v	West Indies; 62/1 (12.3 overs)
Liam Scott 66 (68); Matthew Patrick 3/43 (10 overs)		Kimani Melius 39 (36); Liam Scott 1/6 (0.3 overs)

No result
Willowmoore Park, Benoni
Umpires: Sharfuddoula (Ban) and Raveendra Wimalasiri (SL)

- West Indies won the toss and elected to field.
- Rain during the West Indies' innings prevented any further play.
- West Indies finished in fifth place in the tournament, after finishing with more points than Australia in the group stage.

=== 3rd-place playoff ===
8 February 2020
10:00
Scorecard

Pakistan	v	New Zealand

Match abandoned
Willowmoore Park, Benoni
Umpires: Roland Black (Ire) and Sharfuddoula (Ban)

- No toss.
- No play was possible due to rain.
- Pakistan finished in third place in the tournament, after finishing with more points than New Zealand in the group stage.

=== Final ===
9 February 2020
10:00
Scorecard

India; 177 (47.2 overs)	v	Bangladesh; 170/7 (42.1 overs)
Yashasvi Jaiswal 88 (121); Avishek Das 3/40 (9 overs)		Parvez Hossain Emon 47 (79); Ravi Bishnoi 4/30 (10 overs)

Bangladesh won by 3 wickets (DLS method)
JB Marks Oval, Potchefstroom
Umpires: Adrian Holdstock (SA) and Sam Nogajski (Aus)
Player of the match: Akbar Ali (Ban)

- Bangladesh won the toss and elected to field.
- Bangladesh were set a revised target of 170 runs from 46 overs due to rain.

== Final standings ==
Pos.	Team
1	Bangladesh
2	India
3	Pakistan
4	New Zealand
5	West Indies
6	Australia
7	Afghanistan
8	South Africa
9	England
10	Sri Lanka
11	Zimbabwe
12	Scotland
13	Canada
14	United Arab Emirates
15	Nigeria
16	Japan
