= Dudgeon (disambiguation) =

Dudgeon is a surname. It may also refer to:

- Dudgeon (steam automobile company), an American mid-19th century automobile manufacturer
- J & W Dudgeon, Victorian ship builders based in Cubitt Town, London
- Dudgeon v United Kingdom, a landmark 1981 European Court of Human Rights case
- Dudgeon dagger, another name for a bollock dagger
- Dudgeon Bank, area off the coast of Norfolk, site of the Dudgeon Offshore Wind Farm

== See also ==
- Dudgeoneidae, a family and genus (Dudgeonea) of moths sometimes called Dudgeon moths
