= Keith Dudgeon =

Keith Dudgeon may refer to:

- Keith Dudgeon (Australian cricketer) (born 1946)
- Keith Dudgeon (South African cricketer) (born 1995)
