= Zoological Survey of India =

Indian governmental agency responsible for zoological research

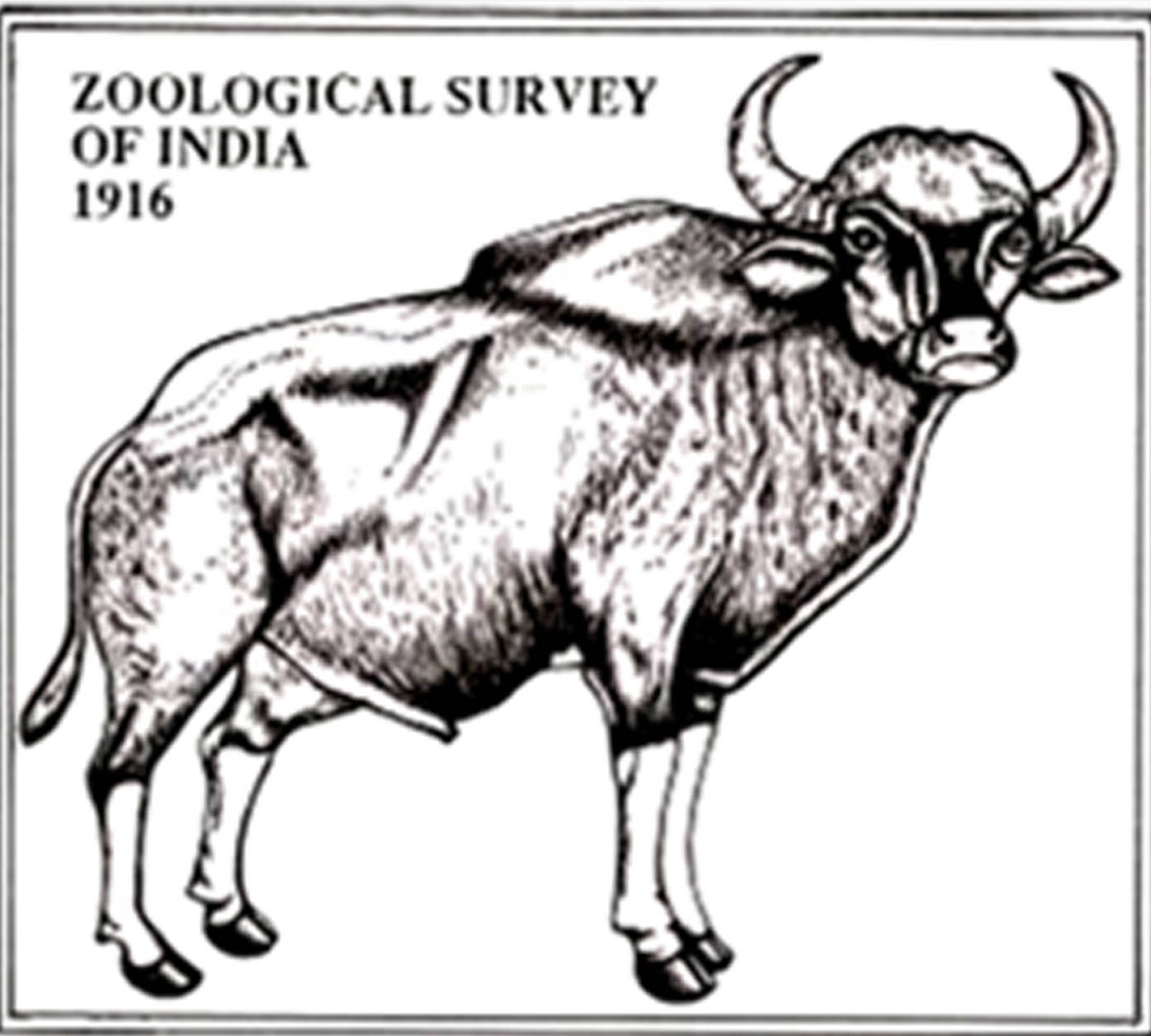
- Abbreviation: ZSI
- Formation: 1 July 1916; 110 years ago
- Type: Government agency
- Purpose: Animal taxonomy and conservation
- Headquarters: Kolkata
- Location: West Bengal, India
- Region served: India
- Director: Dr. Dhriti Banerjee
- Parent organisation: Ministry of Environment, Forest and Climate Change
- Budget: ₹129.35 crore (US$13 million) (2025–26)
- Website: zsi.gov.in

The Zoological Survey of India (ZSI), founded on 1 July 1916 by the Ministry of Environment, Forest and Climate Change of the Government of India as a premier Indian organisation in zoological research and studies to promote the survey, exploration and research of the Indian wildlife.

== History ==
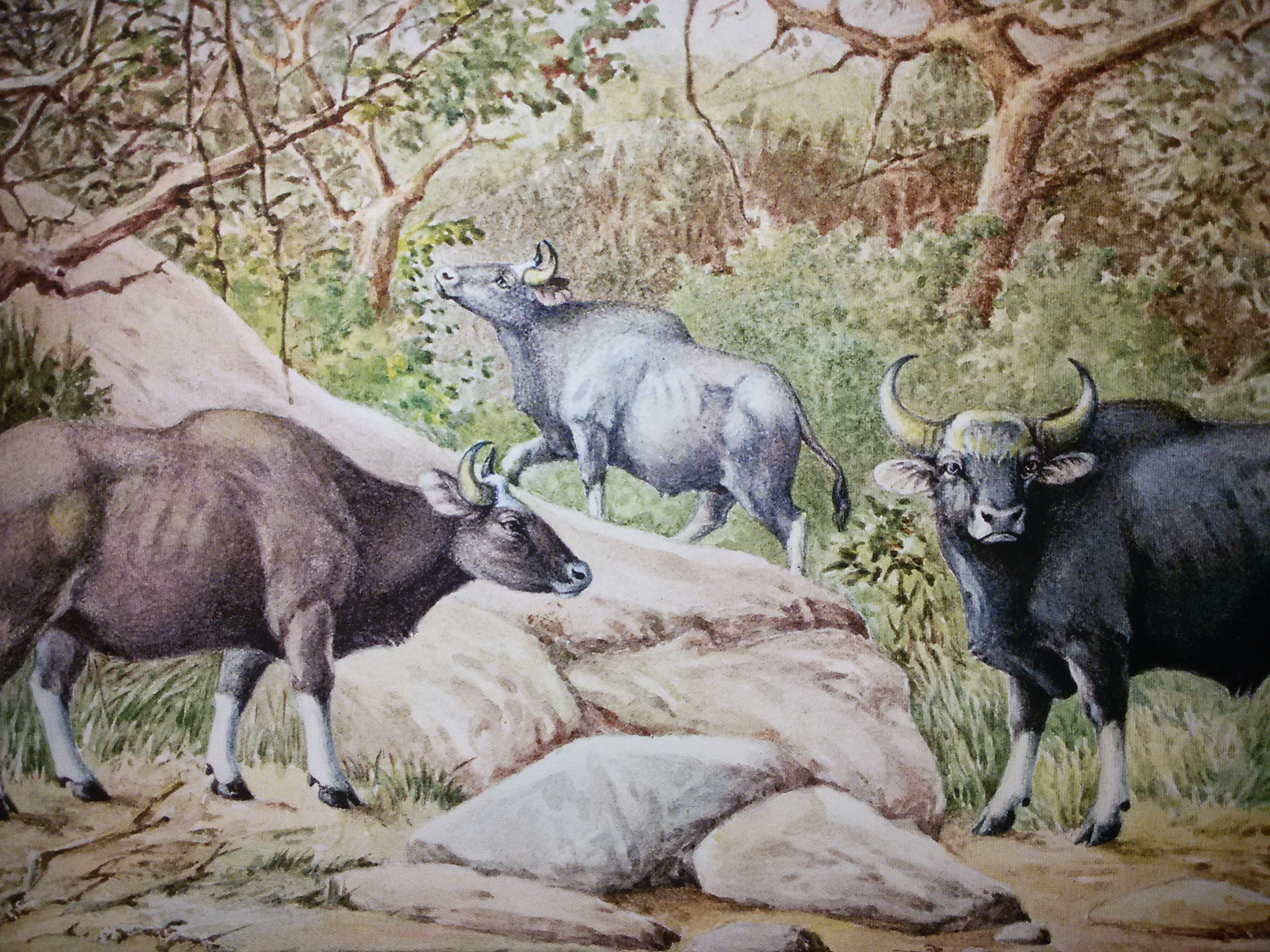
Indian Gaur (Bos gaurus) the mascot of ZSI. Source: ZSI library painting collection

The annals of (ZSI) reflect an eventful beginning for the Survey even before its formal birth and growth.

The establishment of the Zoological Survey of India (ZSI) was the fulfillment of the dream of Sir William Jones, who in 1784 founded the Asiatic Society of Bengal, which was also the mother institution to the Indian Museum (1875). The Asiatic Society had started collecting zoological and geological specimens since 1796 and set up a museum in 1814. Nathaniel Wallich, the first Superintendent of the "Museum of the Asiatic Society", was in charge of the increasing collections of Geological and Zoological specimens; he had augmented the animal collections to the Zoological Galleries of the Museum.

The genesis of the ZSI was in 1875 with the opening of the Indian Museum. The new museum on its inception comprised only three sections: the Zoological, the Archaeological and the Geological. The zoological collections of the Asiatic Society of Bengal were formally handed over to the board of trustees of the Indian Museum in 1875.

Zoological Section of the Museum during the period from 1875 to 1916 steadily expanded, growing to the greatest collection of natural history in Asia. By the care and activity of the Curators of the Asiatic society of Bengal and the Superintendents of the Indian Museum, viz., John McClelland, Edward Blyth, John Anderson, James Wood-Mason, Alfred William Alcock and finally Thomas Nelson Annandale and his colleagues, the museum was richly endowed with a magnificent collection of animals, especially of the larger vertebrate groups. Further additions of both land and aquatic fauna to the valuable collections came through during several political and military expeditions, including a number of collections purchased, notably those of Francis Day of Indian Fishes, Lionel de Nicéville of butterflies, Dudgeon and Edward Ernest Green of moths, Jacob R. H. Neervoort van de Poll of beetles and Godwin Austen of mollusks.

The Zoological Gallery at the Asiatic society Museum under the care and charge of Nathaniel Wallich served the impetus for the formation of the Zoological Survey of India, which was later born as an independent organization on 1 July 1916. The excerpt from the ‘Constitution of the Zoological Survey of India’, released by the Government of India, Department of Education, Resolution no. 19-Museum, dated Shimla, 20 June 1916, states: "In March 1913, the Chairman of the Trustees of the Indian Museum forwarded a representation from the Superintendent of the Zoological and Anthropological Section of the Museum regarding the recognition of the Zoological Section as Zoological Survey. The Government of India, who had already under consideration the desirability of establishing on a sound basis a Zoological Survey of India, informed the Trustees of the Museum that they would be prepared to consider a scheme for such a survey on lines somewhat similar to the existing Botanical Survey of India and asked to furnish with the necessary details. The trustees accordingly submitted their proposals at the end of September 1913."

Thomas Nelson Annandale, who joined the Indian museum as Deputy Superintendent (1904), and later as the Superintendent (1907), after years-old struggle, achieved his aim in establishing the Zoological survey of India, and became its founder director and continued until his premature death in April 1924. Dr. Annandale was Honorary Secretary to the Trustees of the Indian Museum for several years; he was also the President of the Asiatic Society of Bengal in 1923.

In 2021, entomologist Dhriti Banerjee became the first woman director of the ZSI since its inception in 1916.

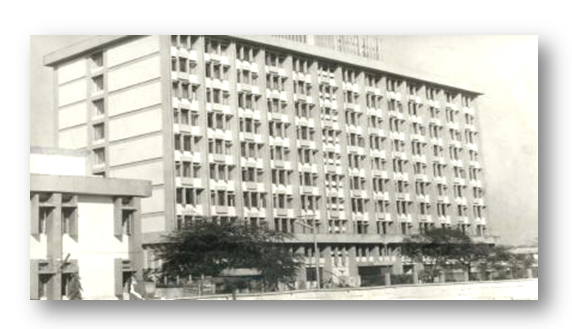
View of ZSI Headquarters, Kolkata in 1986

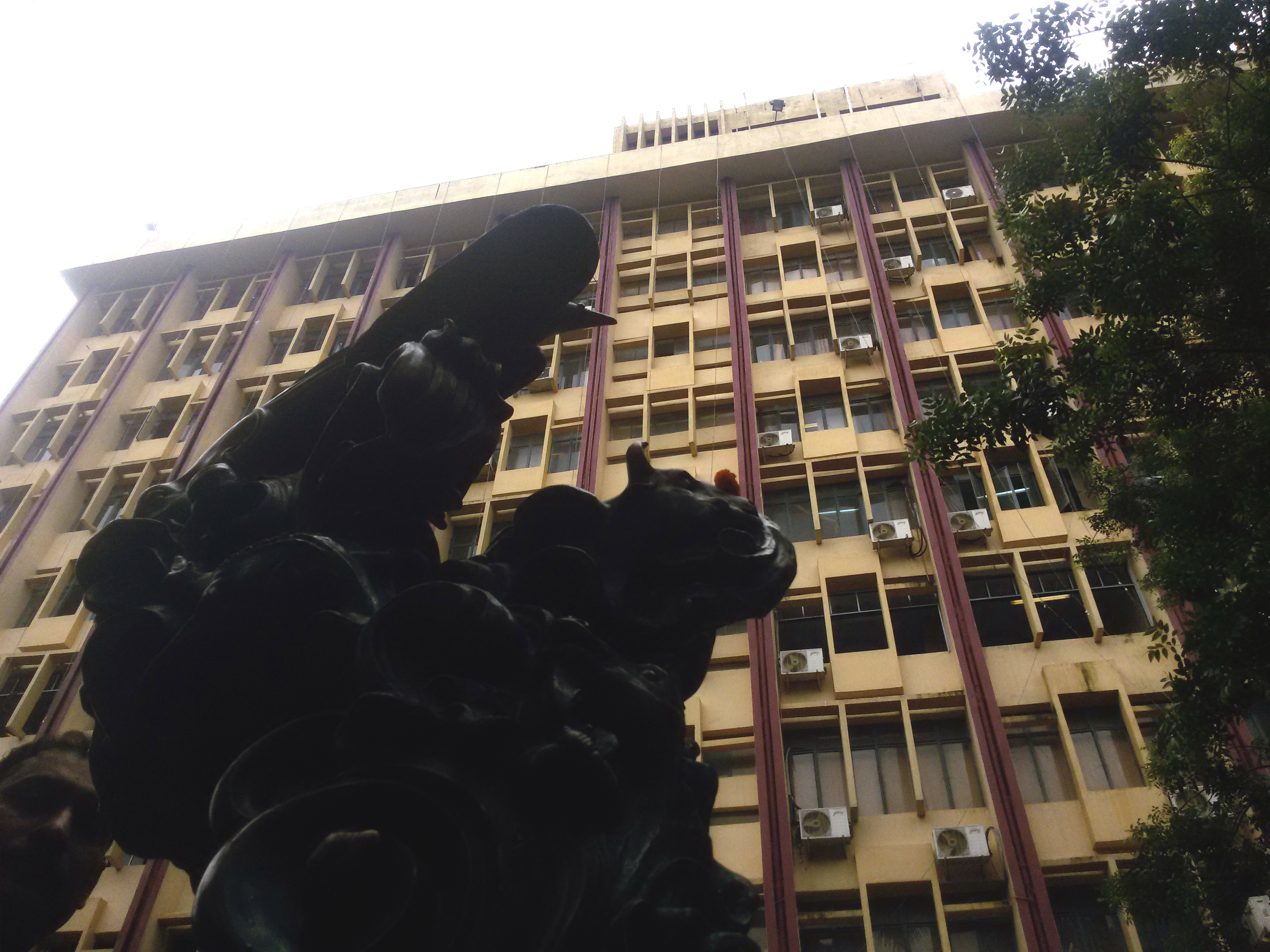
View of ZSI, Kolkata in 2015. The sculpture "Jeevandhara" in the foreground

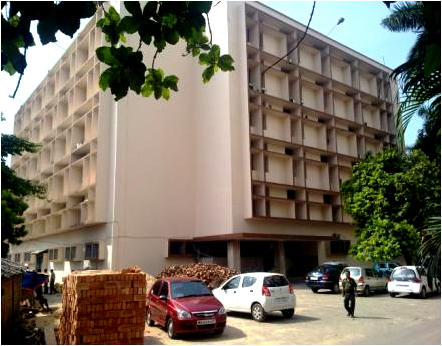
View of Fire Proof Spirit Building, Indian Museum, Kolkata

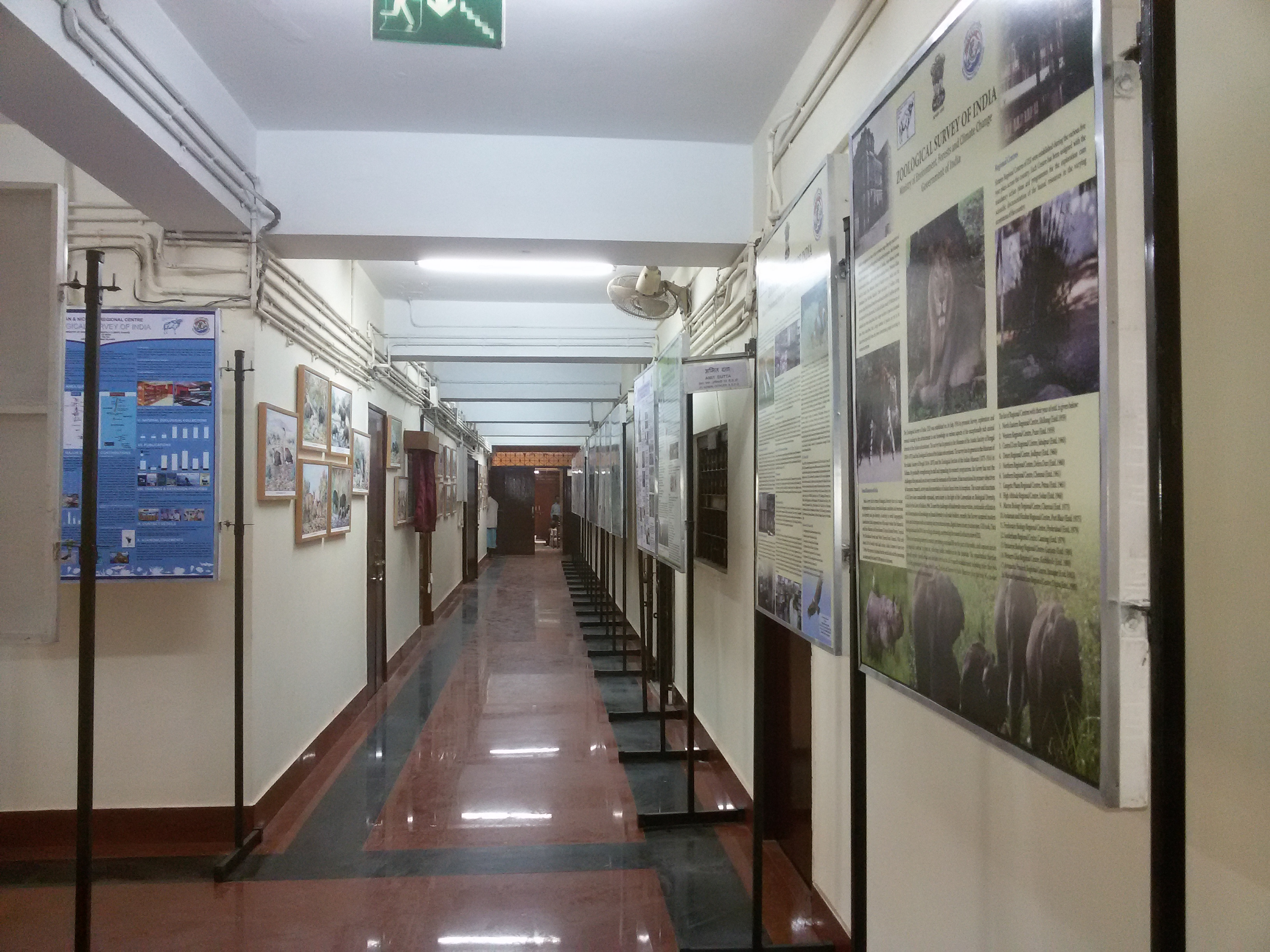
View of ZSI corridor at Kolkata

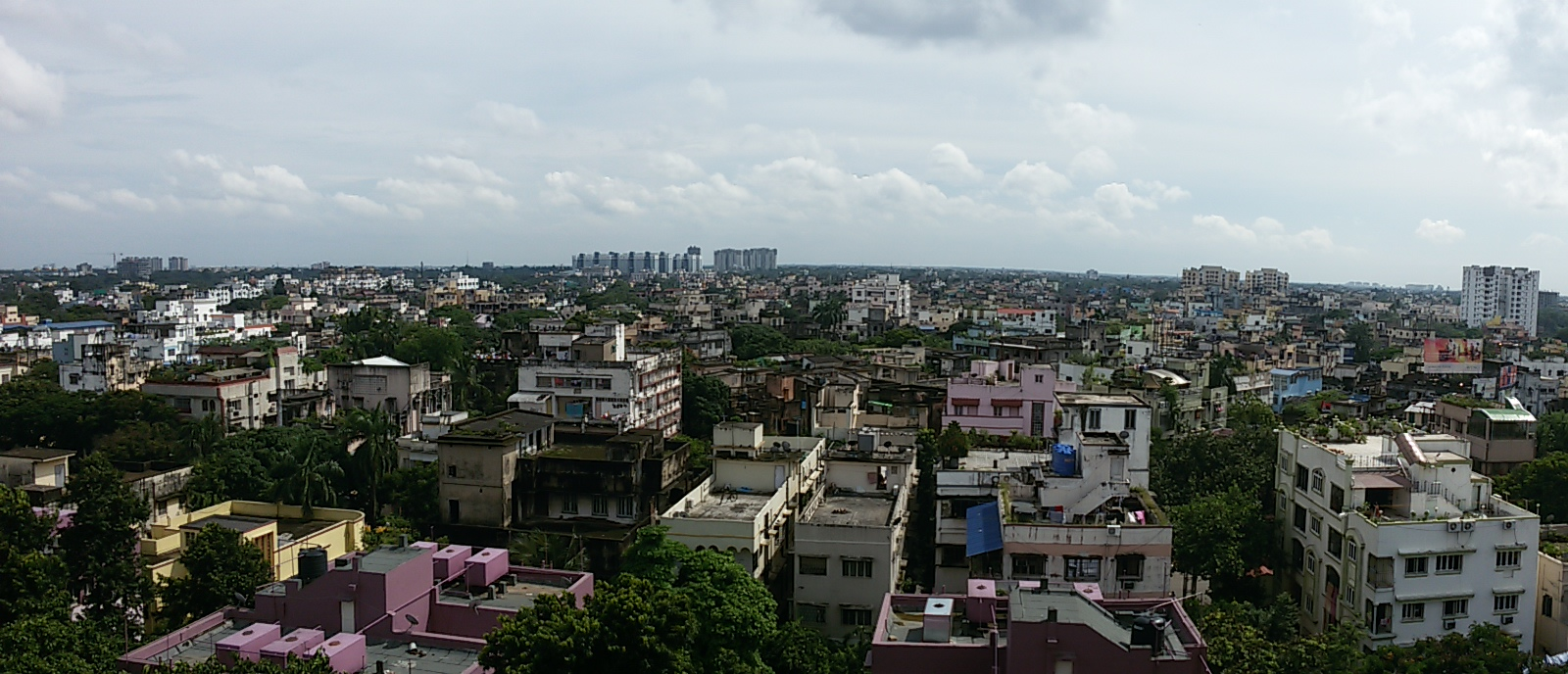
View of Kolkata City from ZSI

== Divisions and sections at headquarters ==
=== Regional Centers ===
- North Eastern Regional Centre (NERC), Shillong, Meghalaya (Estd. 1959).
- Western Regional Centre (WRC), Pune, Maharashtra (Estd. 1959).
- Central Zone Regional Centre (CZRC), Jabalpur, Madhya Pradesh (Estd. 1960).
- Desert Regional Centre (DRC), Jodhpur, Rajasthan (Estd. 1960).
- Northern Regional Centre (NRC), Dehra Dun, Uttarakhand (Estd. 1960).
- Southern Regional Centre (SRC), Chennai, Tamil Nadu (Estd. 1961).
- Gangetic Plains Regional Centre (GPRC), Patna, Bihar (Estd. 1965).
- High Altitude Regional Centre (HARC), Solan, Himachal Pradesh (Estd. 1968).
- Marine Biology Regional Centre (MBRC), Madras, Tamil Nadu (Estd. 1973).
- Andaman and Nicobar Regional Centre (ANRC), Port Blair (Estd. 1977).
- Freshwater Biology Regional Centre (FBRC), Hyderabad, Telangana (Estd. 1979).
- Sunderbans Regional Centre (SRC), Canning, West Bengal (Estd. 1979).
- Estuarine Biology Regional Centre (EBRC), Ganjam, Orissa (Estd. 1980).
- Western Ghats Regional Centre (WGRC), Kozhikode, Kerala (Estd. 1980).
- Arunachal Pradesh Regional Centre (APRC), Itanagar, Arunachal Pradesh (Estd. 1983).
- Marine Aquarium Cum Regional Centre (MARC), Digha, West Bengal (Estd. 1989).

== National zoological collections ==
The Survey acquired the zoological collections of more than a century old from the former museum of the Asiatic Society of Bengal and the zoological section of the Indian Museum (1814–1875) in Calcutta.

== Publications ==
- Records of the Zoological Survey of India
- Memoirs of Zoological Survey of India
- Occasional Papers
- Fauna of British India
- Fauna of India
- Annual Report since 1961–62
- State Fauna Series (20 States)
- Conservation Area Series
- Ecosystem Series
- Wetland Series
- Estuarine Series
- Marine Series
- Himalayan Series
- Animal Discoveries (New species and New records)
- Handbooks/Pictorial Guides
- Special Publication Series
- Status Survey of Threatened Animals
- Bibliography of India Zoology (Discontinued)
- Zoologiana (Discontinued) Vol. 1–5
- Technical Monograph (Discontinued) Vol. 1–17
- Bulletin of ZSI Vol. (Discontinued) Vo. 1–8

== ZSI library ==
The library in Kolkata and regional centers have a total collection of approximately 1,35,000 volumes, which includes books, journals, monographs, reports of expeditions and fauna surveys, periodicals and other archaic literature on Zoology. The Kolkata library has around 400 titles of rare books. Some of the notable documents include the original publications of Carl Linnaeus and Fabricius, original paintings and drawings of renowned scientists, biogeographers and naturalists.

== Gallery ==
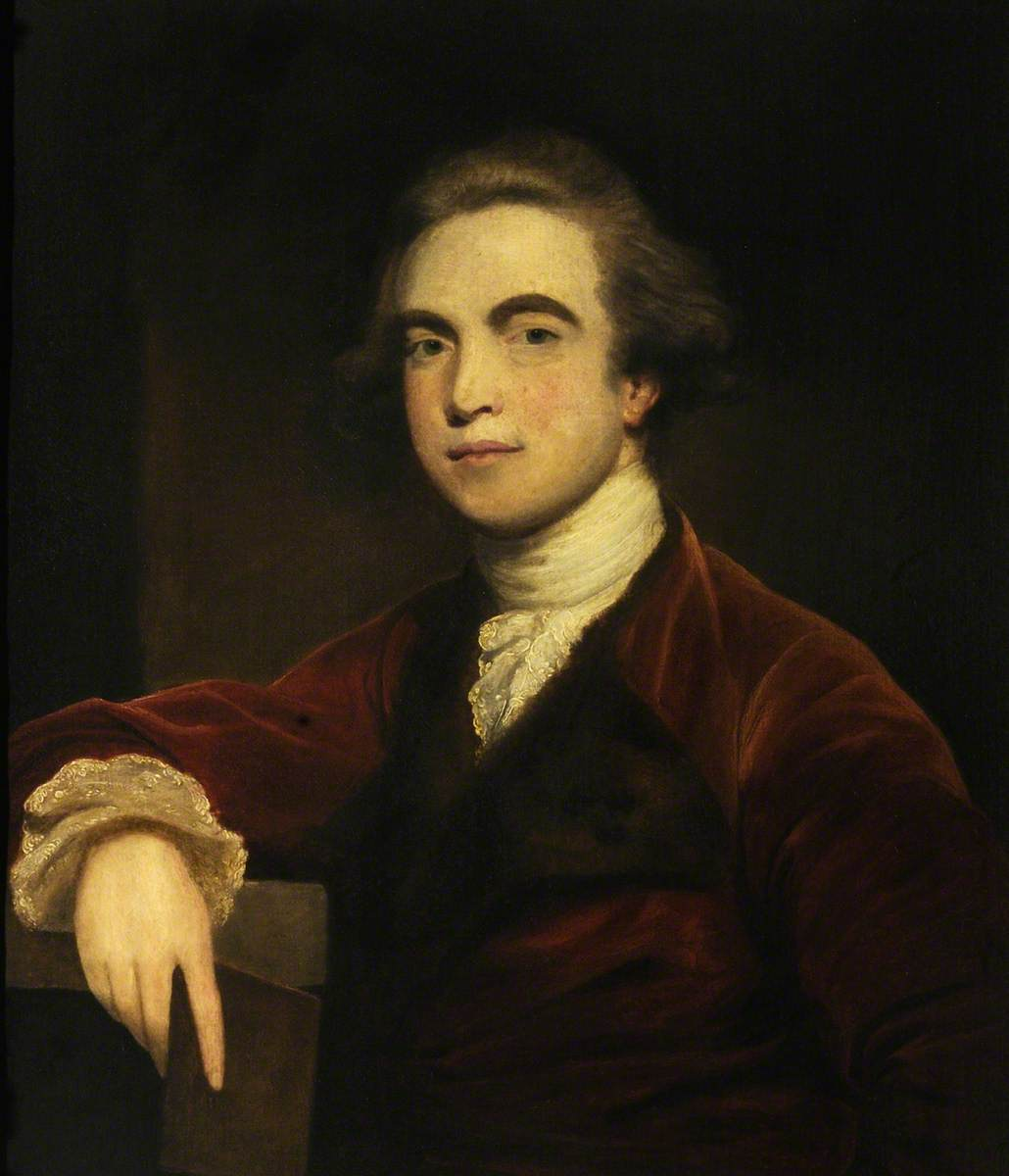
Sir William Jones

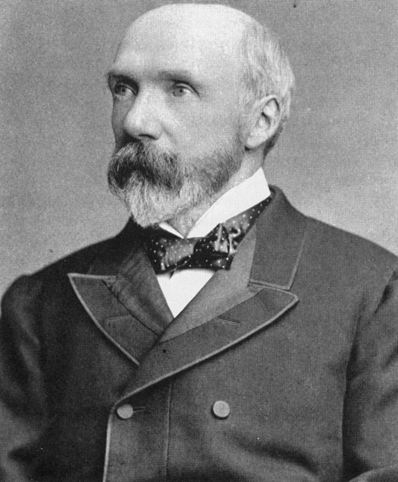
John Anderson

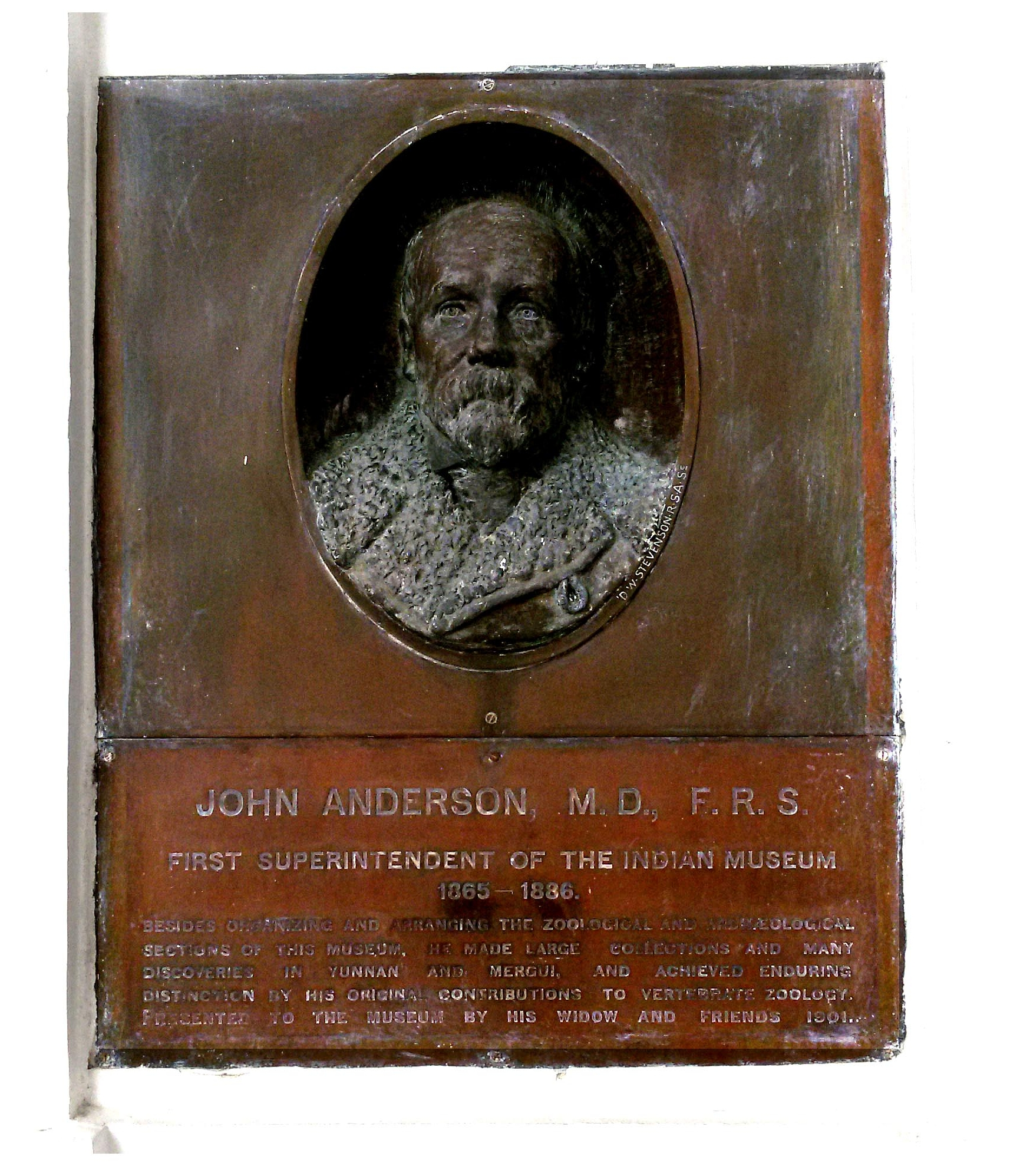
Bust of John Anderson at Indian Museum

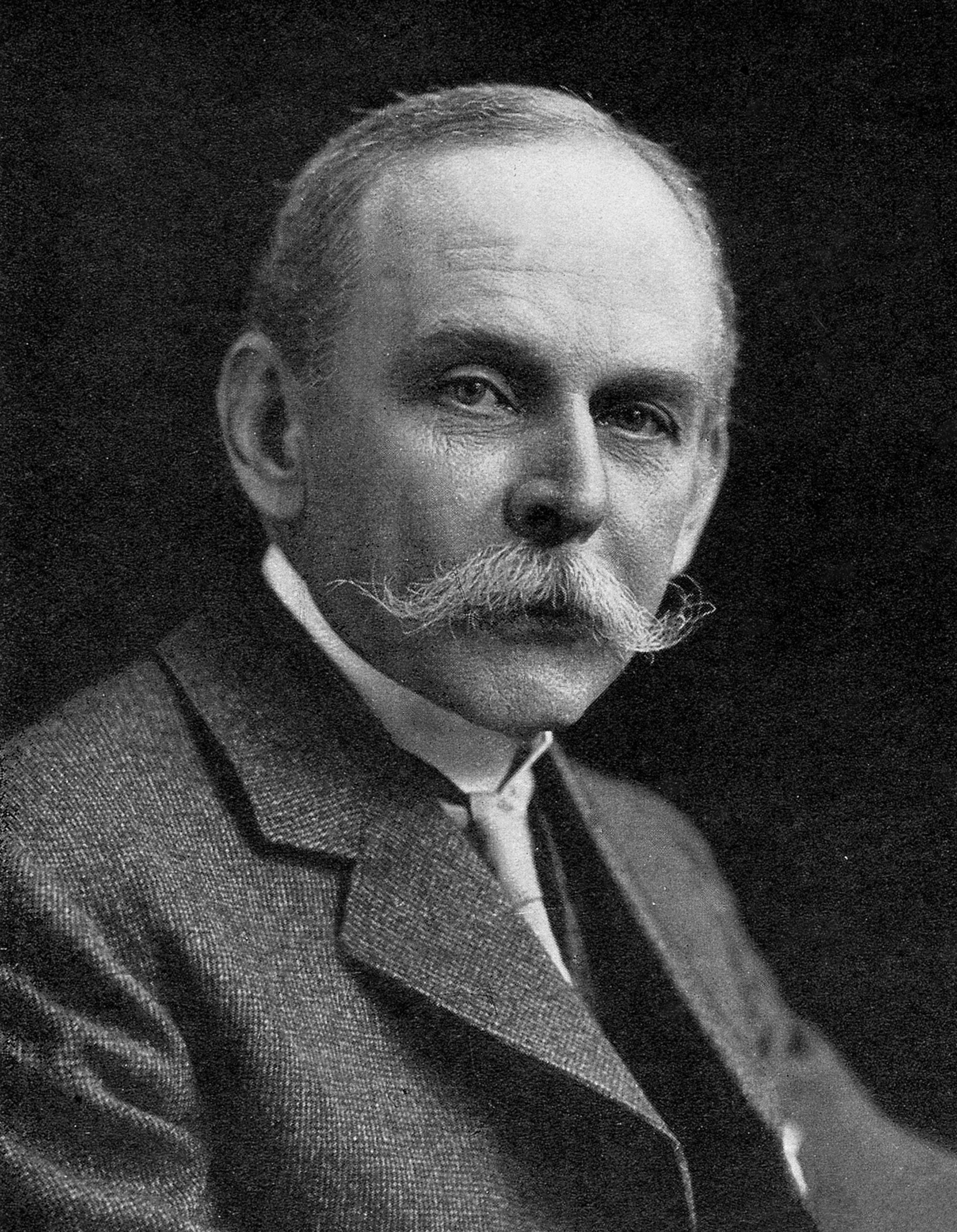
Alfred Alcock

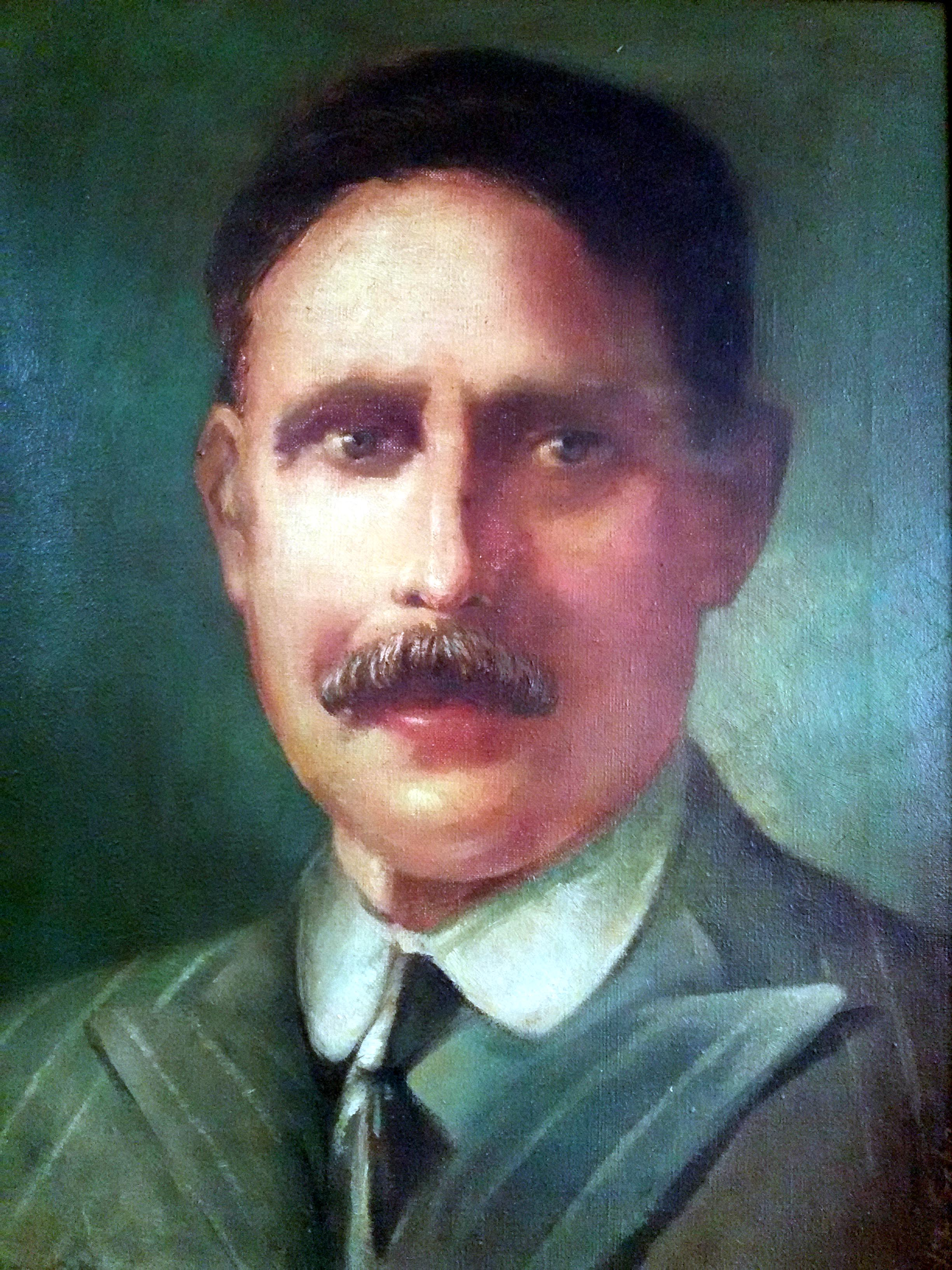
Portrait of Nelson Annandale by ZSI Artist

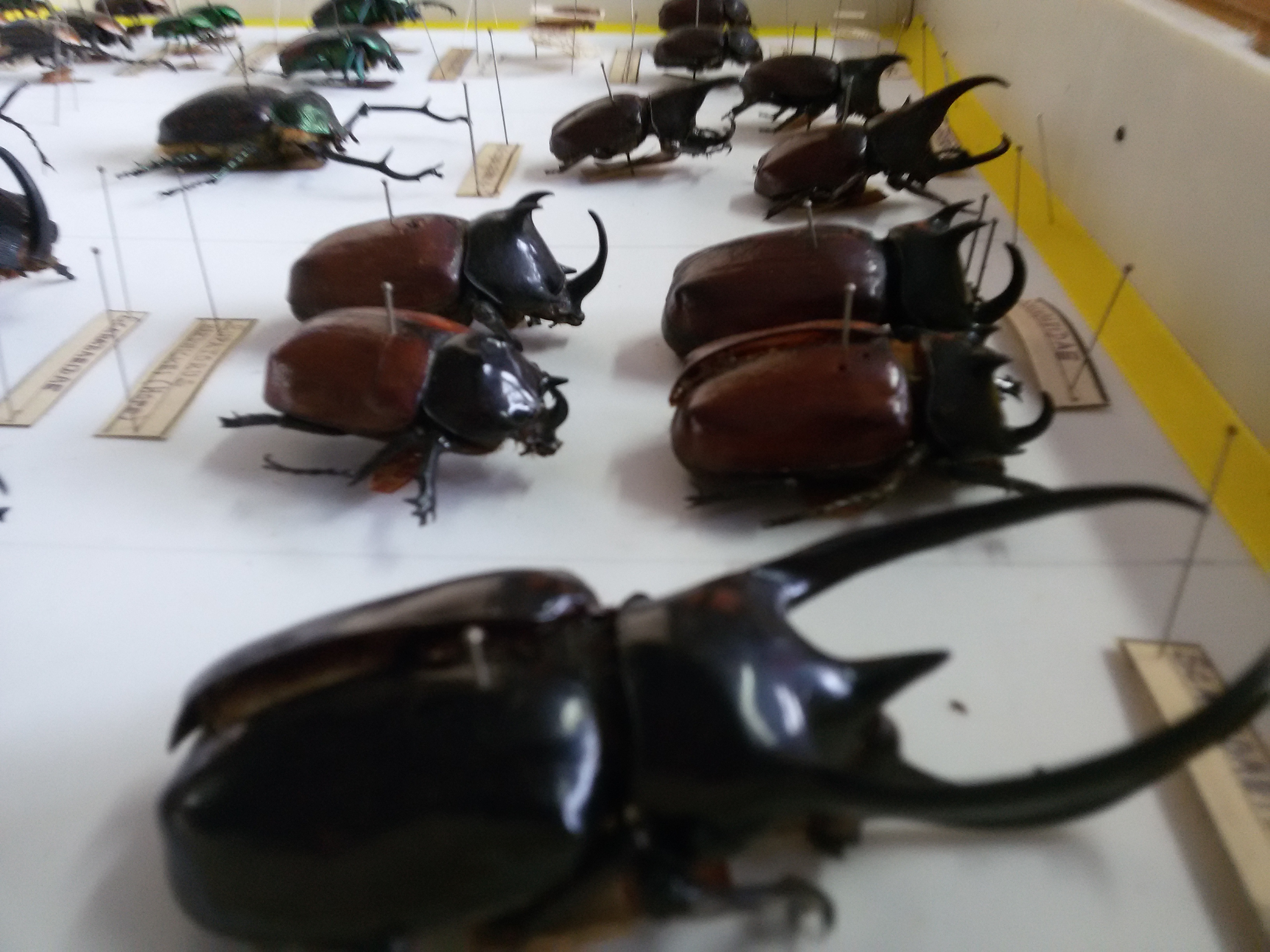
Beetle specimens at Coleoptera Section, Kolkata

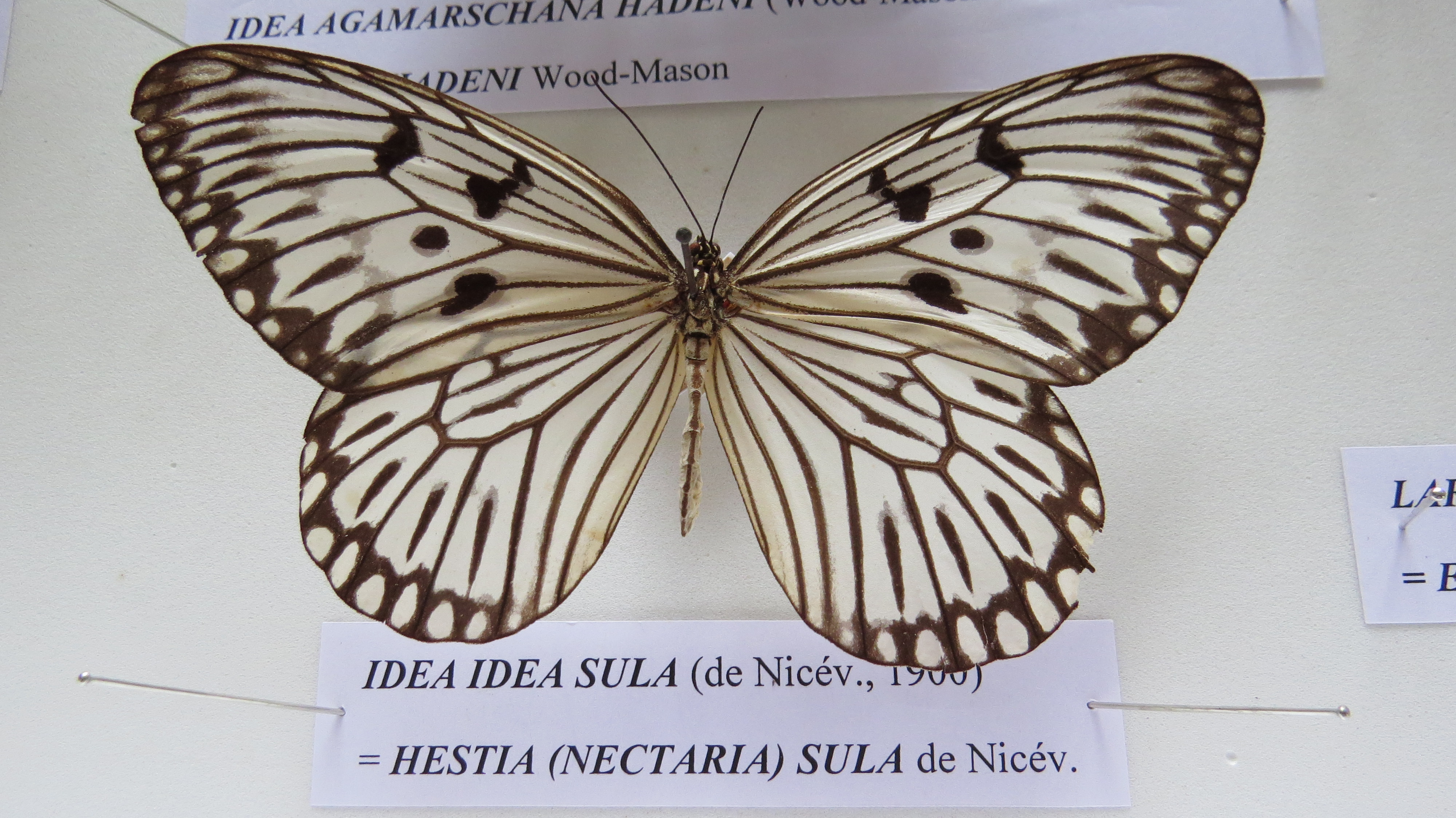
Idea sula sula specimen at Central Entomology Laboratory, ZSI, Kolkata

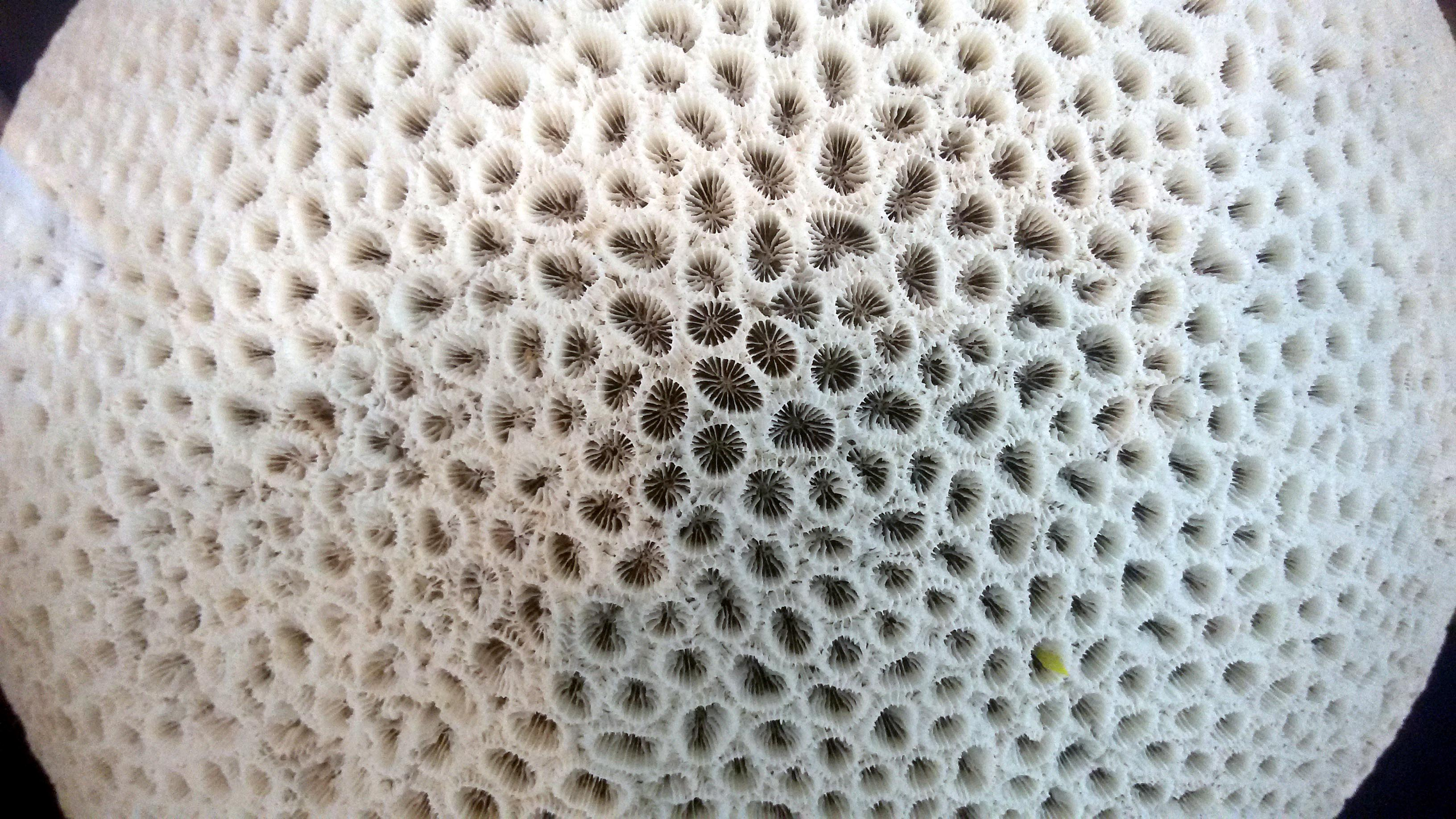
Coral at Marine Museum, ZSI, Chennai

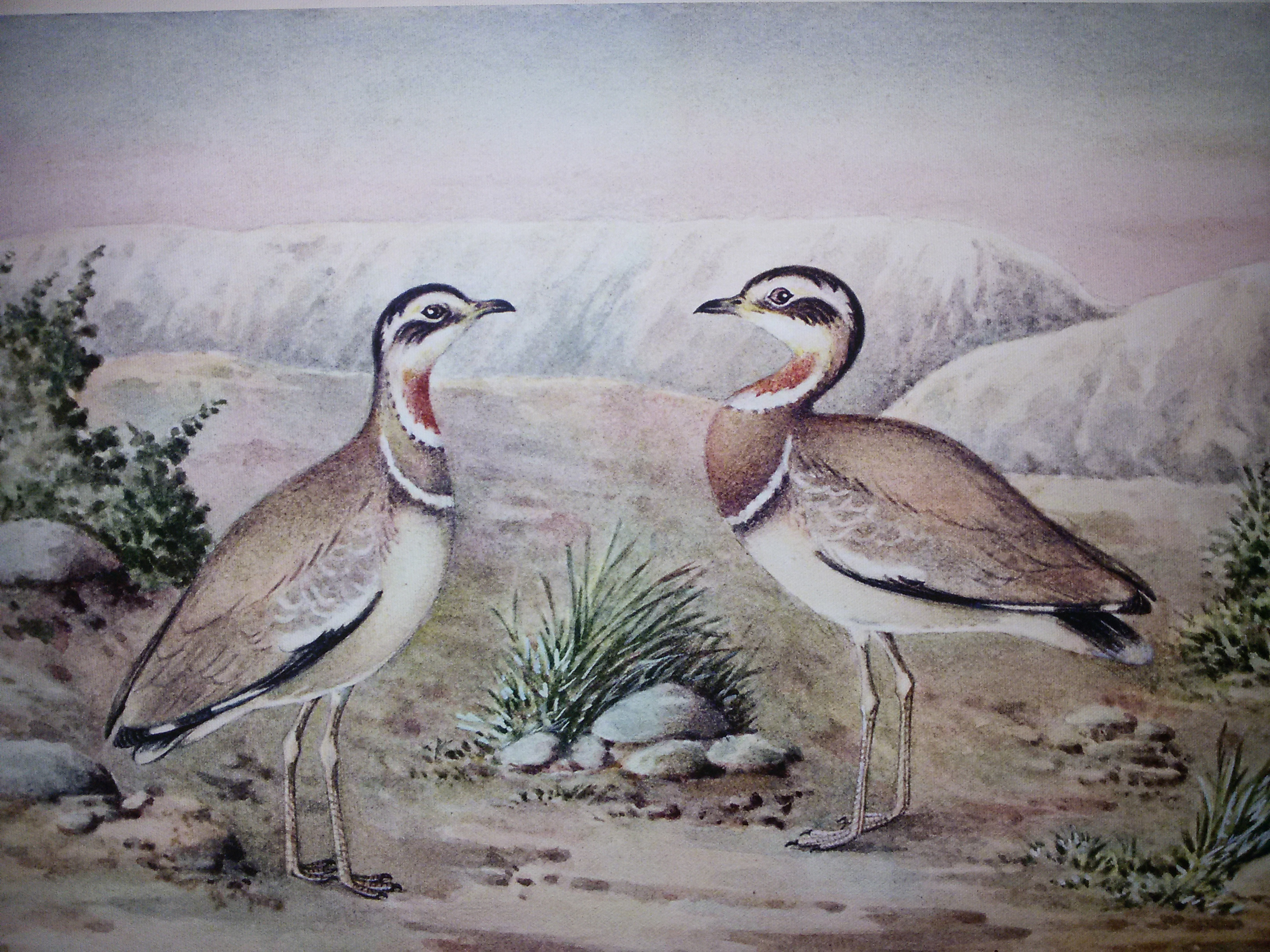
ZSI Library collection:Painting of Jerdon's Courser (Rhinoptilus bitorquatus) by ZSI artist

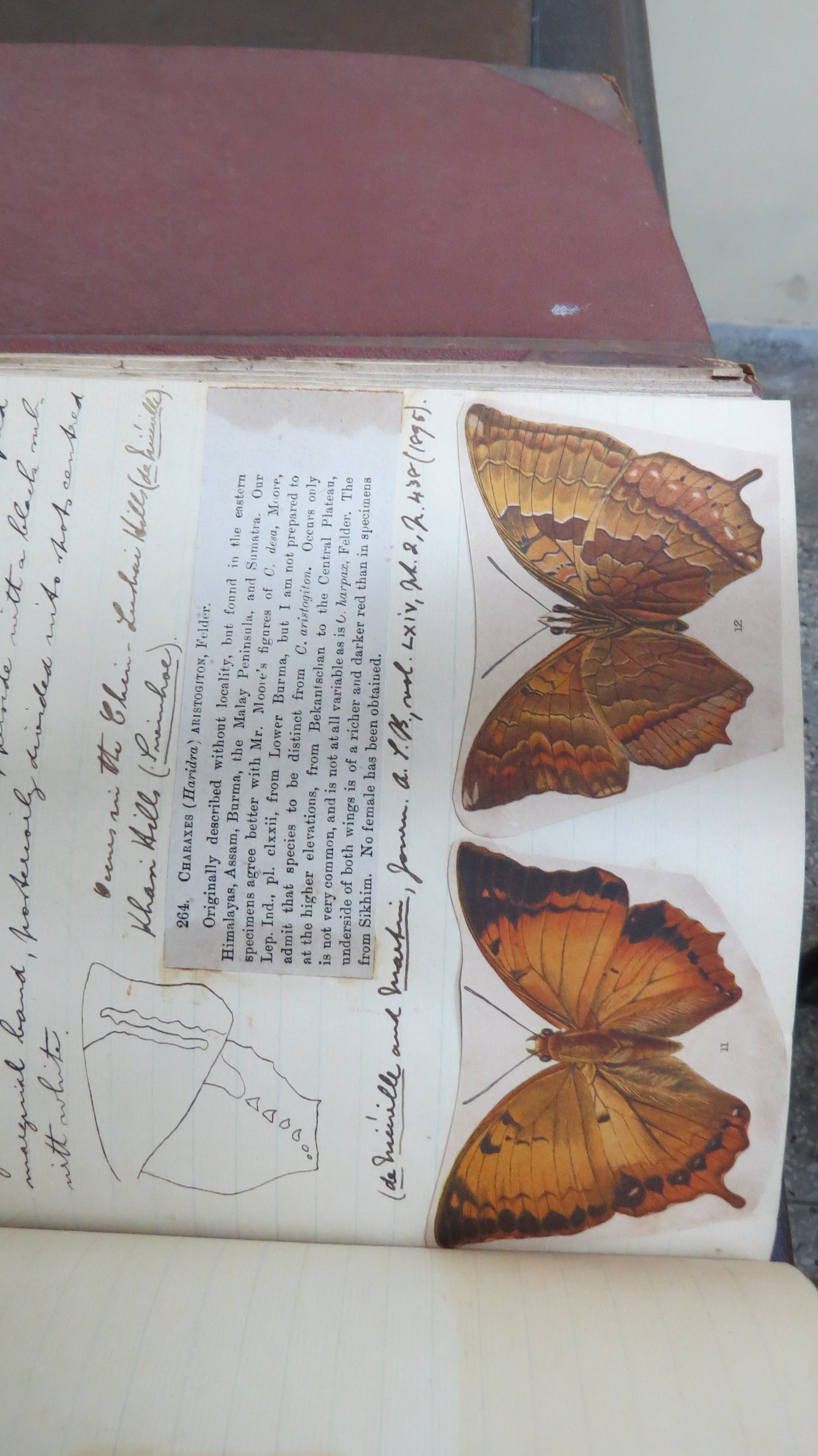
ZSI Library collection: A view of manuscript collection

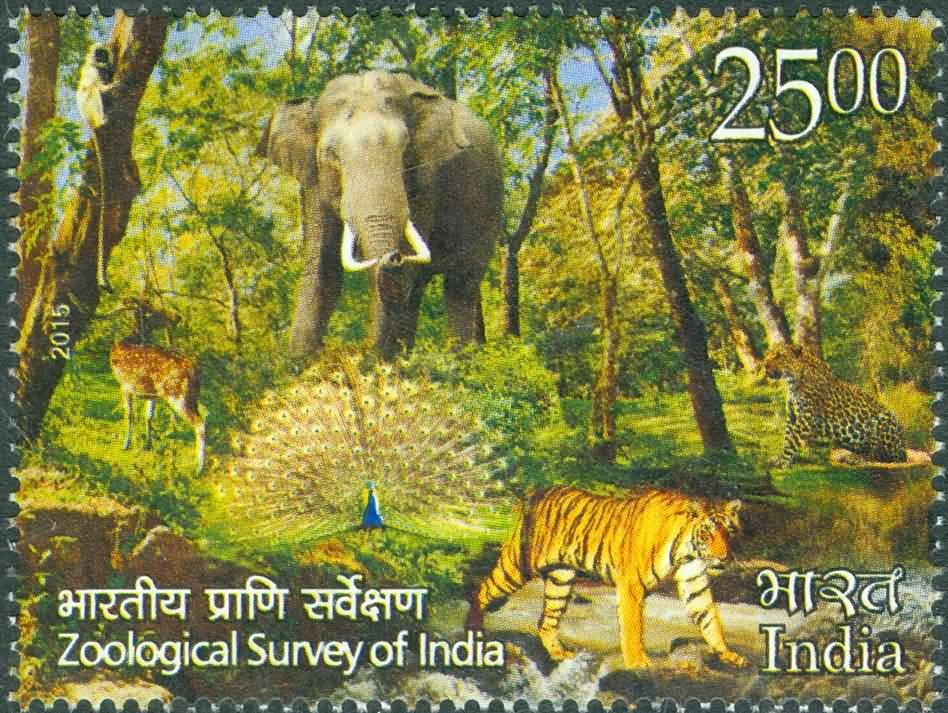
Stamp of India 2015: Zoological Survey Of India

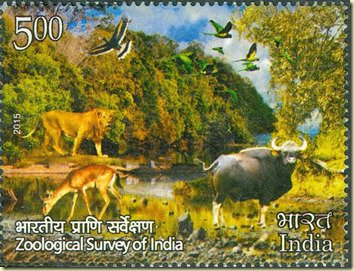
Stamp of India 2015 Zoological Survey Of India

== See also ==
- List of zoo associations
- Botanical Survey of India (BSI)
- Forest Survey of India (FSI)
- Wildlife Institute of India (WII)
- Salim Ali Centre for Ornithology and Natural History (SACON)
- Survey of India (SI)
- Geological Survey of India (GSI)
- Anthropological Survey of India (AnSI)
