= Dudgeon (steam automobile company) =

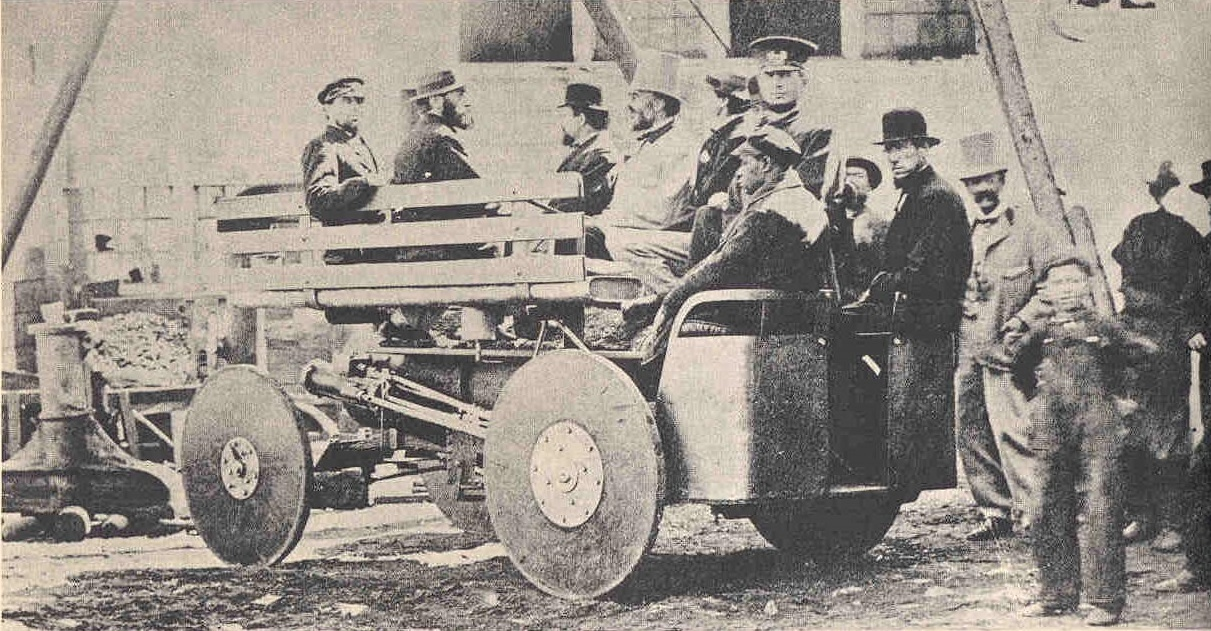
The 1857s Red Devil Steamer

Dudgeon was an American steam automobile company active in the middle of the 19th century.

In 1855, inventor Richard Dudgeon astounded New Yorkers by driving from his home to his place of business in a steam carriage. The noise and vibration generated by the Red Devil Steamer frightened horses so badly that city authorities confined it to one street.

After losing the original in a fire, Dudgeon constructed a second steamer in 1866. After encountering more opposition to the vehicle, he moved his family, and the steam carriage, to Long Island to escape city officials. Here he and his carriage became a familiar site, often with a young boy running ahead to warn travelers of the danger that followed.

Dudgeon ran the steam carriage many hundreds of miles and once covered a mile in under two minutes. Although the inventor claimed the carriage could carry 10 people at 14 m.p.h. on one barrel of anthracite coal, it was too far ahead of its time and failed to gain popular favor.
