= House raising =

Lifting a building from its foundation

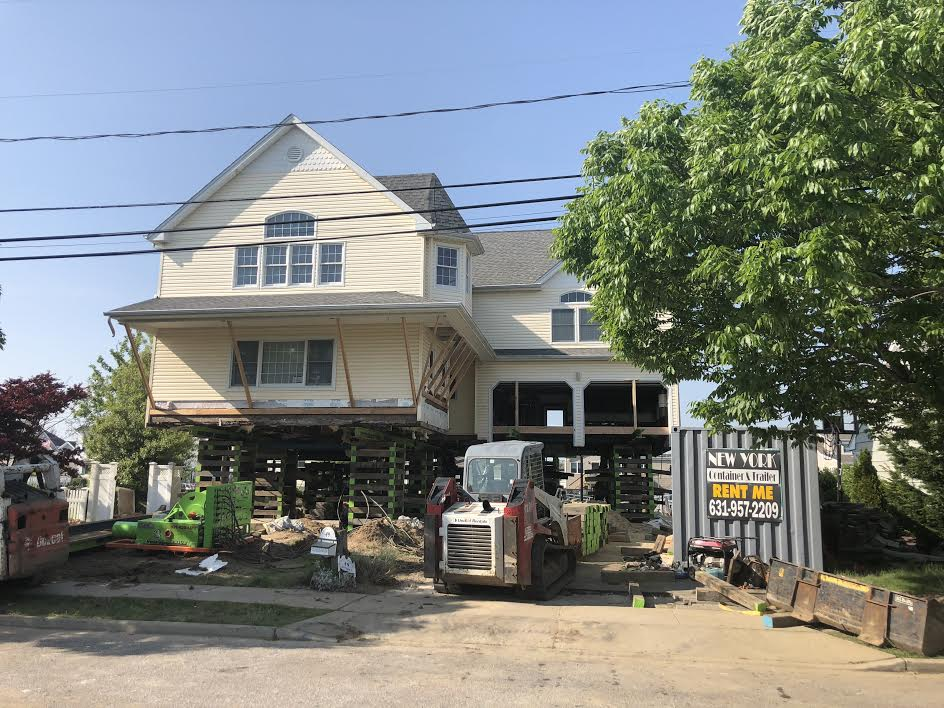
A house raised and held on box cribs during foundation work

House raising (also called house lifting, house jacking, barn jacking, building jacking) is the process of separating a building from its foundation and temporarily raising it with hydraulic screw jacks.

The process is the first step in structure relocation in which the building is moved to a different location. House raising may also be a part of a renovation to build a foundation under an existing house or make a house larger by adding a new floor level. Often employed in areas that are prone to flooding and storm damage, this process can be achieved through the use of either timber piles or helical piles. Once a house is raised and supported on cribbing, a new foundation can be constructed beneath it. After Hurricane Katrina and Hurricane Sandy large numbers of houses in parts of Louisiana, New York and New Jersey were raised to avoid future flooding.

Jacking and shoring, such as using jack posts, are used to hold a wooden building up during foundation and sill repairs. Little published information is available about building jacking methods. The skills are usually acquired through experience working for a building jacking or moving company.
