= Dudgeon =

Dudgeon is a surname. Notable people with the surname include:

- Archie Dudgeon (1911–1959), Scottish wrestler
- Cecil Dudgeon (1885–1970), Scottish politician
- Elspeth Dudgeon (1871–1955), Scottish actress
- Frederick Dudgeon (1866–1943), British Army major-general
- Gus Dudgeon (1942–2002), English record producer, most notably collaborating with Elton John
- Herbert Dudgeon (1872–1935), English rugby union footballer
- James Dudgeon (born 1981), English football coach and former player
- Jeff Dudgeon (born 1946), Northern Irish politician, historian and gay political activist
- Joe Dudgeon (born 1990), English football coach, scout, and former player
- John Dudgeon (1837–1901), Scottish physician, surgeon, translator and medical missionary in China
- John Dudgeon, co-founder of J & W Dudgeon, a former shipbuilding and engineering company
- Keith Dudgeon (Australian cricketer) (born 1946)
- Keith Dudgeon (South African cricketer) (born 1995)
- Matthew S. Dudgeon (1871–1949), American politician, district attorney and longtime director of the Milwaukee Public Library
- Mike Dudgeon (born 1967), American politician
- Neil Dudgeon (born 1961), English actor
- Pat Dudgeon, Aboriginal Australian psychologist
- Patrick Dudgeon (1817–1895), British landowner, mineralogist and meteorologist
- Richard Dudgeon ((1819–1895), Scottish-born American inventor and mechanic
- Robert Ellis Dudgeon (1820–1904), Scottish homeopath
- Robert Francis Dudgeon (1851–1932), Lord Lieutenant of Kirkcudbright
- Robert Maxwell Dudgeon (1881–1962), Scottish soldier and policeman
- Sinead Dudgeon (born 1976), Scottish retired hurdler and sprinter
- William Dudgeon (poet) (c. 1753–1813), Scottish poet
- William Dudgeon (philosopher) (1705/6–1743), Scottish philosophical writer
- William Dudgeon, co-founder of J & W Dudgeon, a former shipbuilding and engineering company
