= Crib pier =

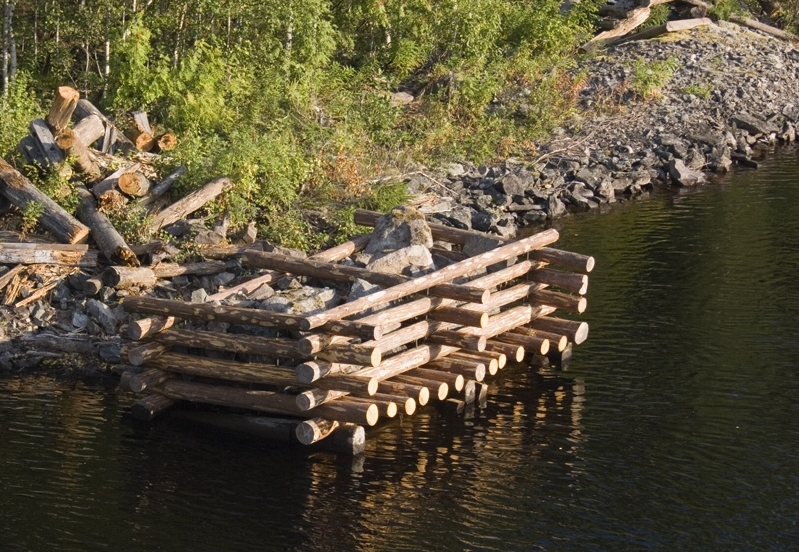
A crib pier under construction in Russia

A crib pier is a type of pier built with the supporting columns made of cribs. Typically a crib is made from wood, but it could be made from any long cylindrical material. Pairs of logs are laid parallel, then others laid over them to make a square, and this continues upwards in a style of building similar to a log cabin's construction.

Each crib can be either empty or filled with a material such as rocks, gravel, concrete blocks, etc. This material can serve to provide additional stability in the event of high winds if the crib is very tall.

Advantages of crib construction include its simplicity and strength. Logs need only be cut and notched for stability, then laid crosswise until a certain height is reached. As each layer of wood is only used as a compressive layer, the wood need not be strong. Since there are few load-bearing fasteners in the lower levels, reasonable strength is possible.

Disadvantages include very heavy construction, relying on much more material than a pier of more advanced design.
