= Box crib =

Temporary support structure

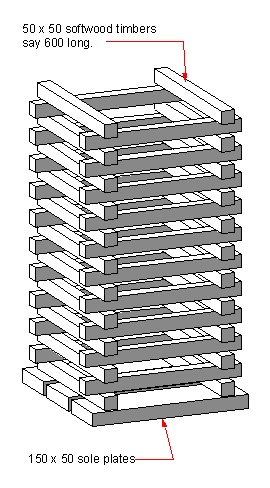
A lightweight box crib

Hardwood railway sleepers used as a box crib, North Australian Railway, 1975

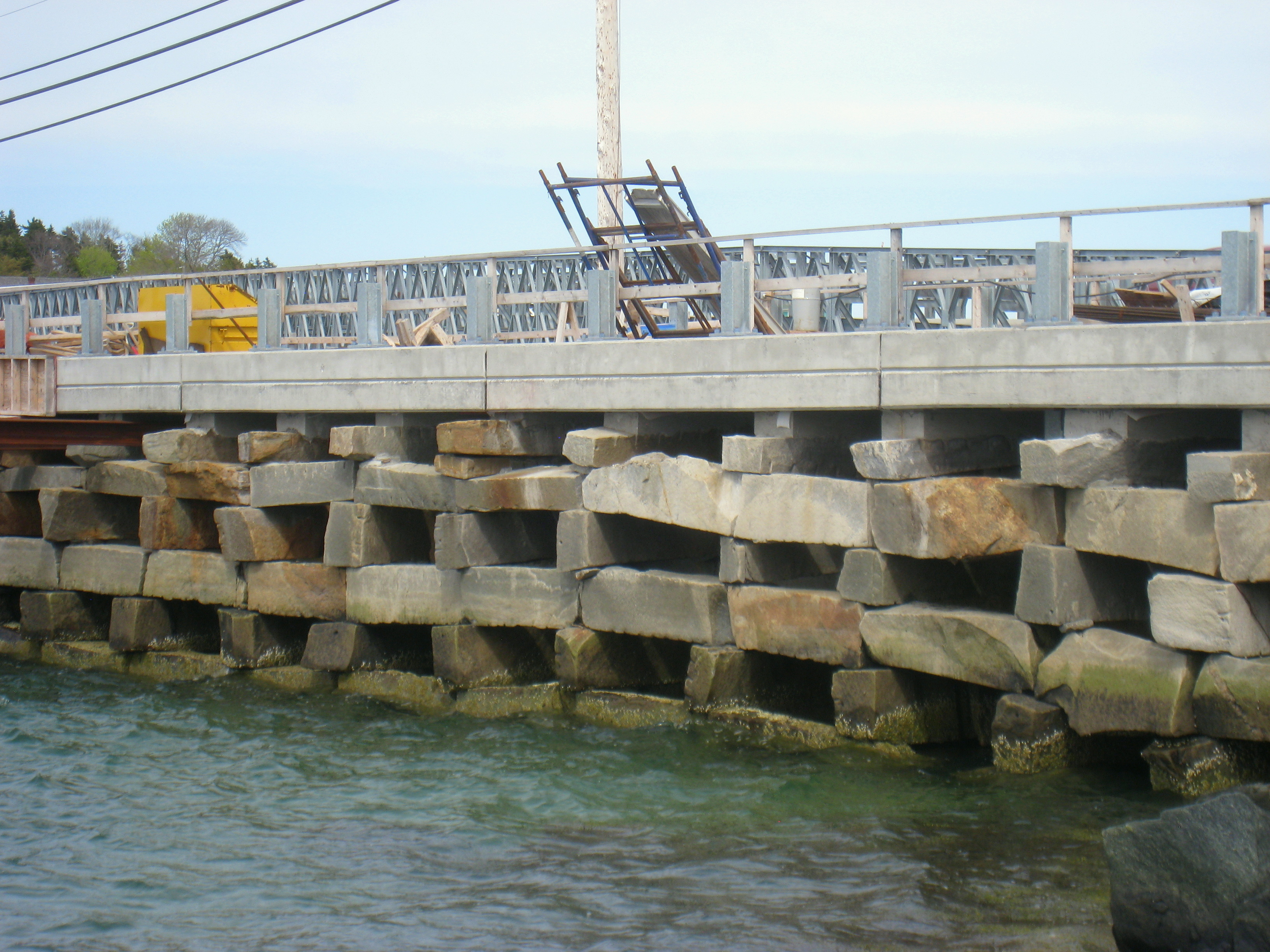
Bailey Island Bridge, Harpswell, Maine. The only granite cribstone bridge in the world.

A box crib or cribbing is a temporary wooden structure used to support heavy objects during construction, relocation, vehicle extrication and urban search and rescue. It is commonly used to secure overturned motor vehicles, and debris within collapsed buildings. Cribbing is often used in conjunction with other stabilization equipment, such as pneumatic or hydraulic shoring. Cribbing is also used in sub-surface mining as a roof support. Cribbing has largely been replaced by hydraulic shoring in modern mining applications.

Some forms of cribbing can be used on movie sets and/or production sites for stabilizing dolly tracks, platforms, and various temporary structures when quick setup times are needed.

== Stability ==
The stability of a crib is affected by a variety of factors: the material used (often a soft wood which gives audible warnings before failure), the number of contact points between the crib and the supported surface, the ratio of the footprint of the crib to its height, and the area of contact made between the crib and the ground and supported surface.

== Materials ==
Cribbing is usually accomplished with blocks of wood, often 4×4 (3 1/2 in or 89 mm) or 6×6 (5 1/2 in or 140 mm) and 18–24 in (460–610 mm) long. Soft woods, like spruce and pine, are often preferred because they crack slowly and make loud noises before completely failing, whereas stiffer woods may fail explosively and without warning.

Cribbing may also be made out of plastic, which unlike wood is not susceptible to rot or corrosion from fluids the cribbing may come in contact with (e.g. oil, gasoline, hydraulic fluid).

Cribbing equipment is normally of three varieties: rectangular blocks, wedges (also called shims), and "step chocks" (large wooden chocks constructed of wood of different lengths). Shims are used to snug up contact between the crib and supported object or change the direction of the crib (tilt). Step chocks are often used as a quick solution for stabilizing vehicles on all fours or to quickly increase the height of a crib.

== Methods ==
Cribbing structures are often categorized by shape. Different shapes of cribbing structures are chosen depending on the area available and the point being cribbed to.

A box crib is the simplest, most stable and most common method of cribbing. It is constructed by arranging sets (two or more) of matched blocks in a regular log-cabin style to form a rising square or rectangular frame. The more blocks on each level, the greater the number of support points and therefore the greater the strength of the crib tower. In trench rescue training materials three basic types of box cribbing are the 4-point, 9-point and full crib. The four point type has two timbers on each level thus four points of contact. Three timbers on each layer makes nine points of contact. The full crib type has each layer filled with timbers. Each point of contact carries a maximum load depending on the size and species of the timbers.

A triangle or A' crib is similar to the box crib, except it resembles a triangular prism instead of rectangular.

A parallelogram crib resembles a diamond prism.

A tilted tower crib is a box crib in which pairs of shims are used to change the direction of the rising structure, resulting in a curve. Curving a crib must be done in moderation and is only advisable for structures at sharp angles to the ground.

== Uses ==
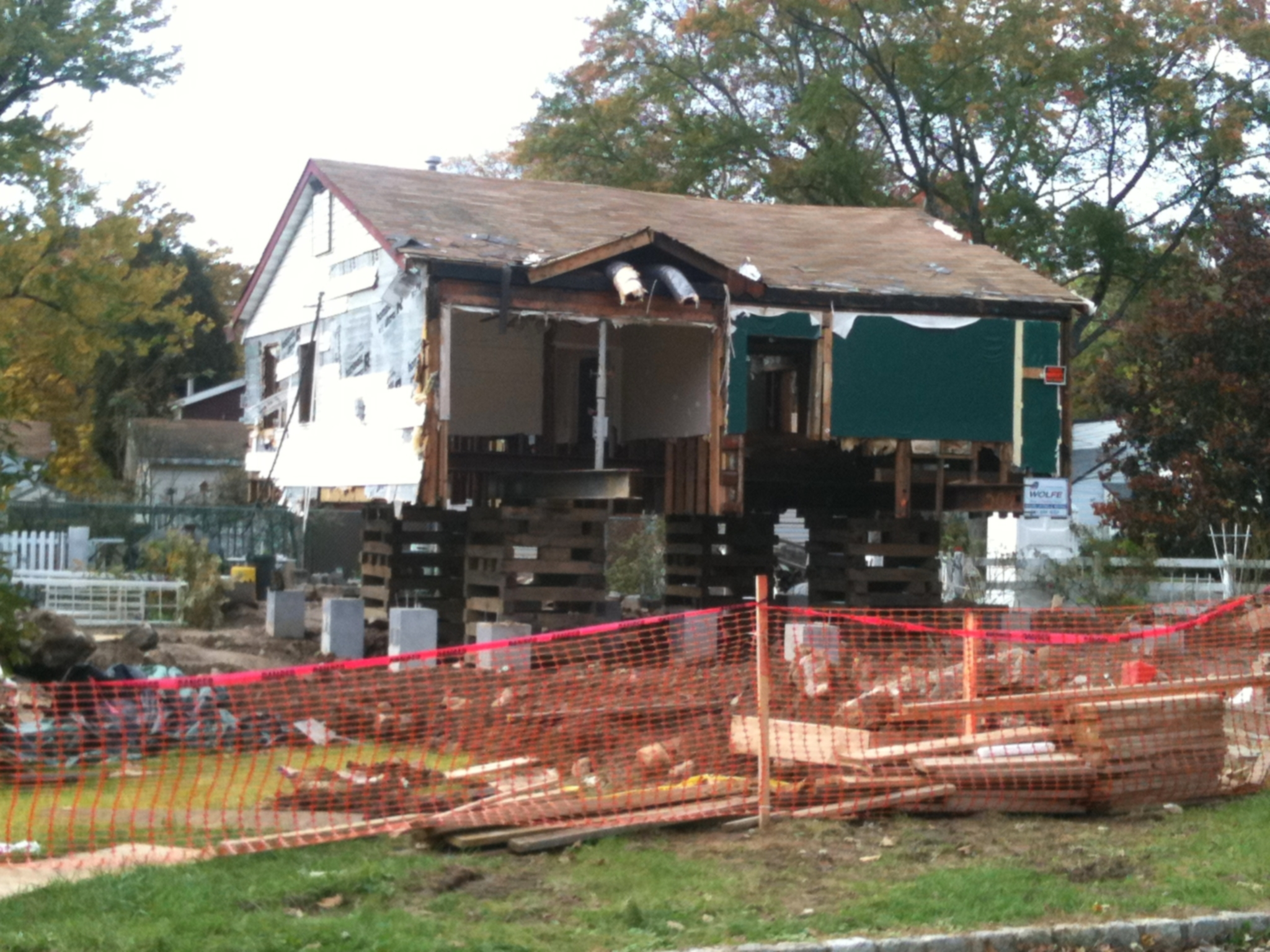
A house is supported by box cribs while new foundation is being constructed as part of a house lifting process.

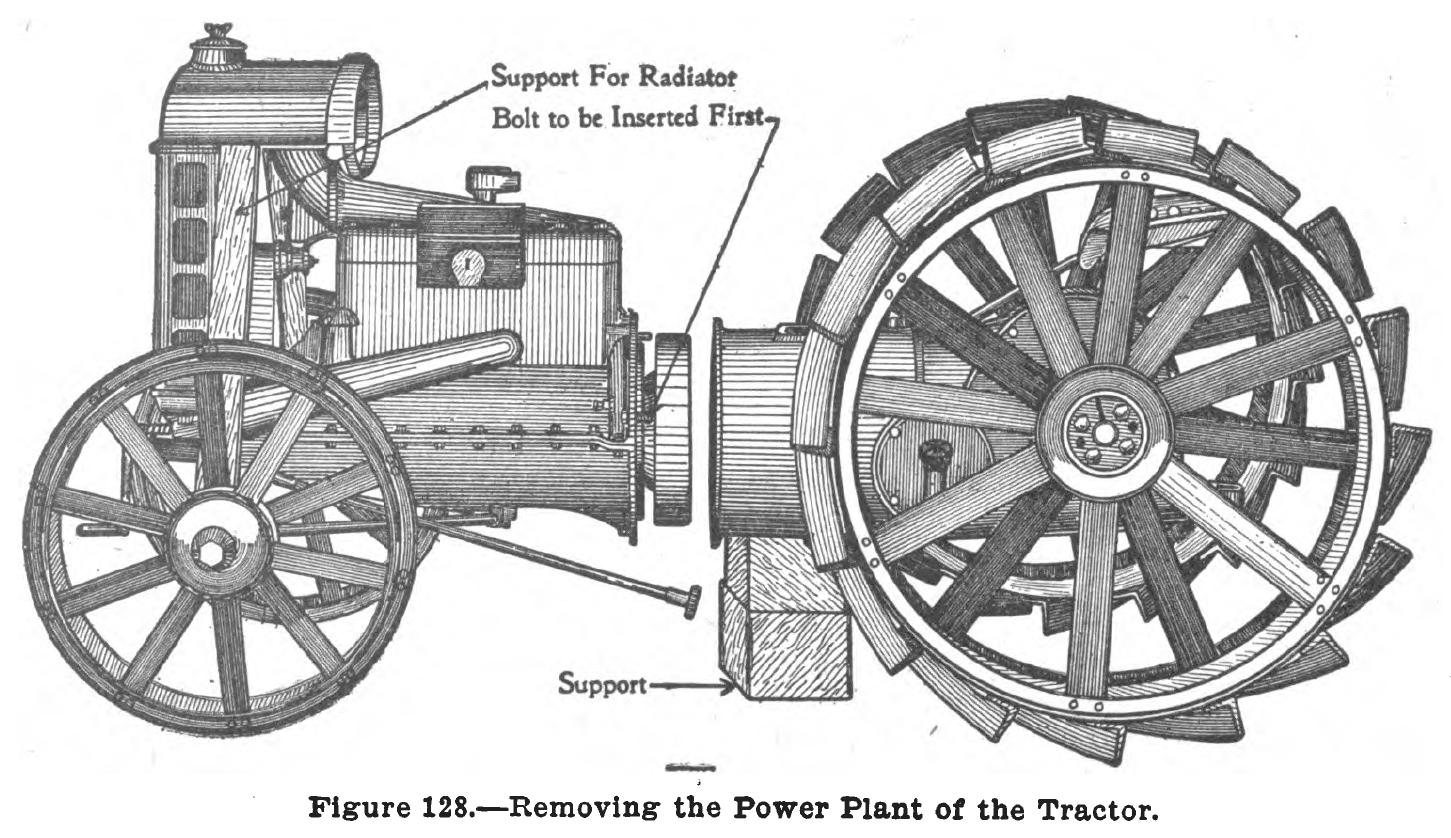
Cribbing blocks supporting a subassembly during tractor repair

Cribbing is often performed as part of lifting/lowering operations. Expressions such as "lift an inch, crib an inch" and "pack as you jack" are used to remind operators of the importance of cribbing to secure and protect the load. The use of cribbing also allows for the use of a lifting device with a limited working range (such as a jack, lifting air bags or hydraulic rescue tools) as the load can be raised to the maximum range of the device, then lowered a short distance onto the cribbing, allowing another platform of cribbing to be built to raise the device and repeat the process.

Cribbing can be used to secure a load following a building collapse, vehicular accident or other event where the regular stability of a structure or vehicle has been reduced.

Cribbing is often used in the repair of heavy equipment or farm equipment. Subassemblies that have been disconnected are supported by cribbing until reassembly. In such work, cribbing is often safer than jack stands because it is less likely to tip over. And if the metal parts bite into the wood, this helps to keep sliding from happening. These factors are especially true in field repairs, because most ground is not perfectly level and hard, like a concrete garage floor would be. Even on concrete, cribbing is often preferred.

In heavy industry, cribbing is a part of the rigger's trade.

Cribbing is used when moving buildings in whole, or in part. Cribbing is used to raise the structure and allow the carrying vehicle to be positioned underneath, at which point the structure is then lowered onto the vehicle and the cribbing towers are removed. At the other end of the operation, the process is reversed, and the structure is lowered into its new position.

== See also ==
- Crib barn
- Crib pier
- Crib dam
- Shoring
