= Jack (device) =

Mechanical, hydraulic, or pneumatic, lifting device

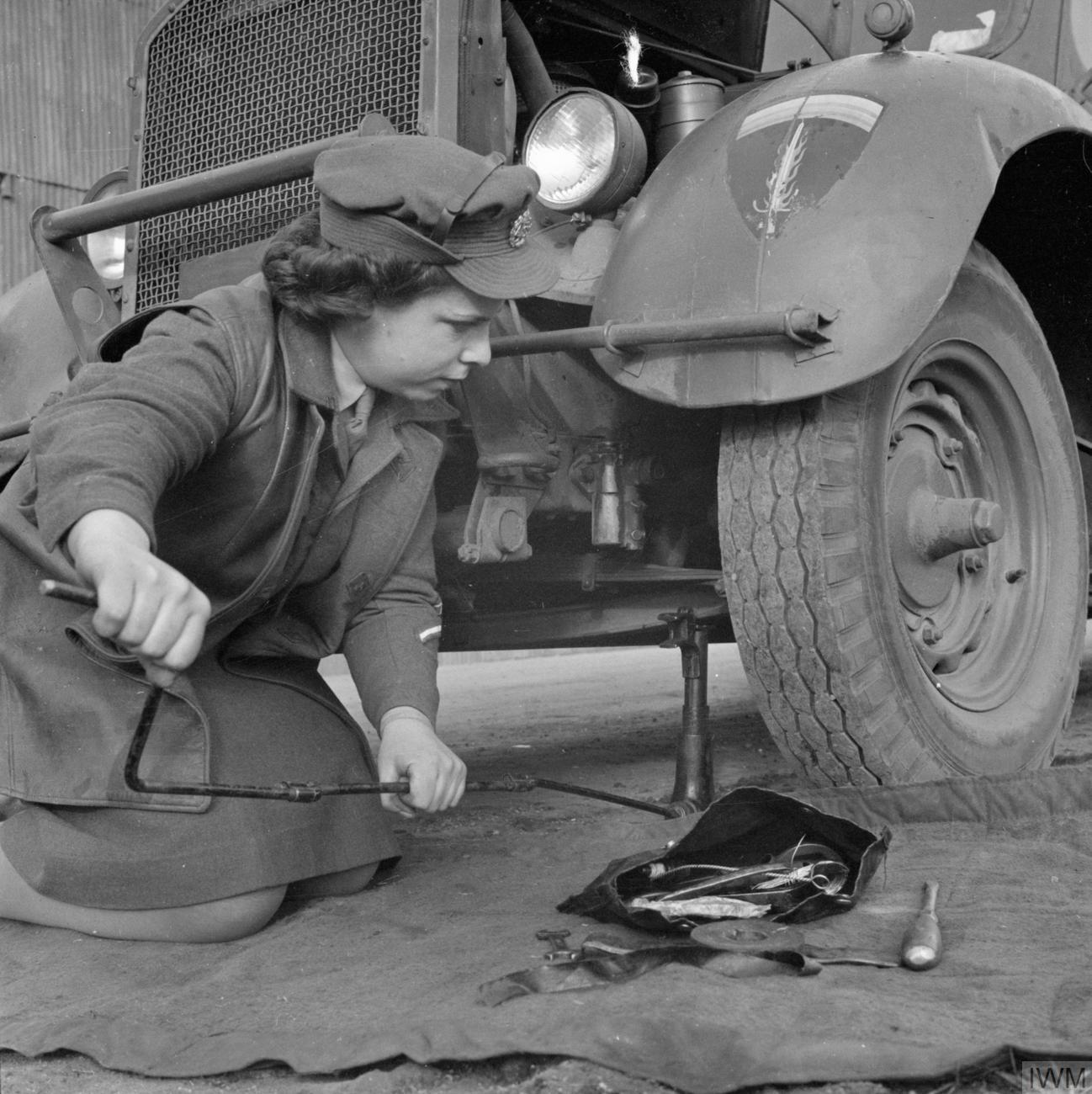
A private in the Auxiliary Territorial Service using a jack to lift a staff car, January 1945

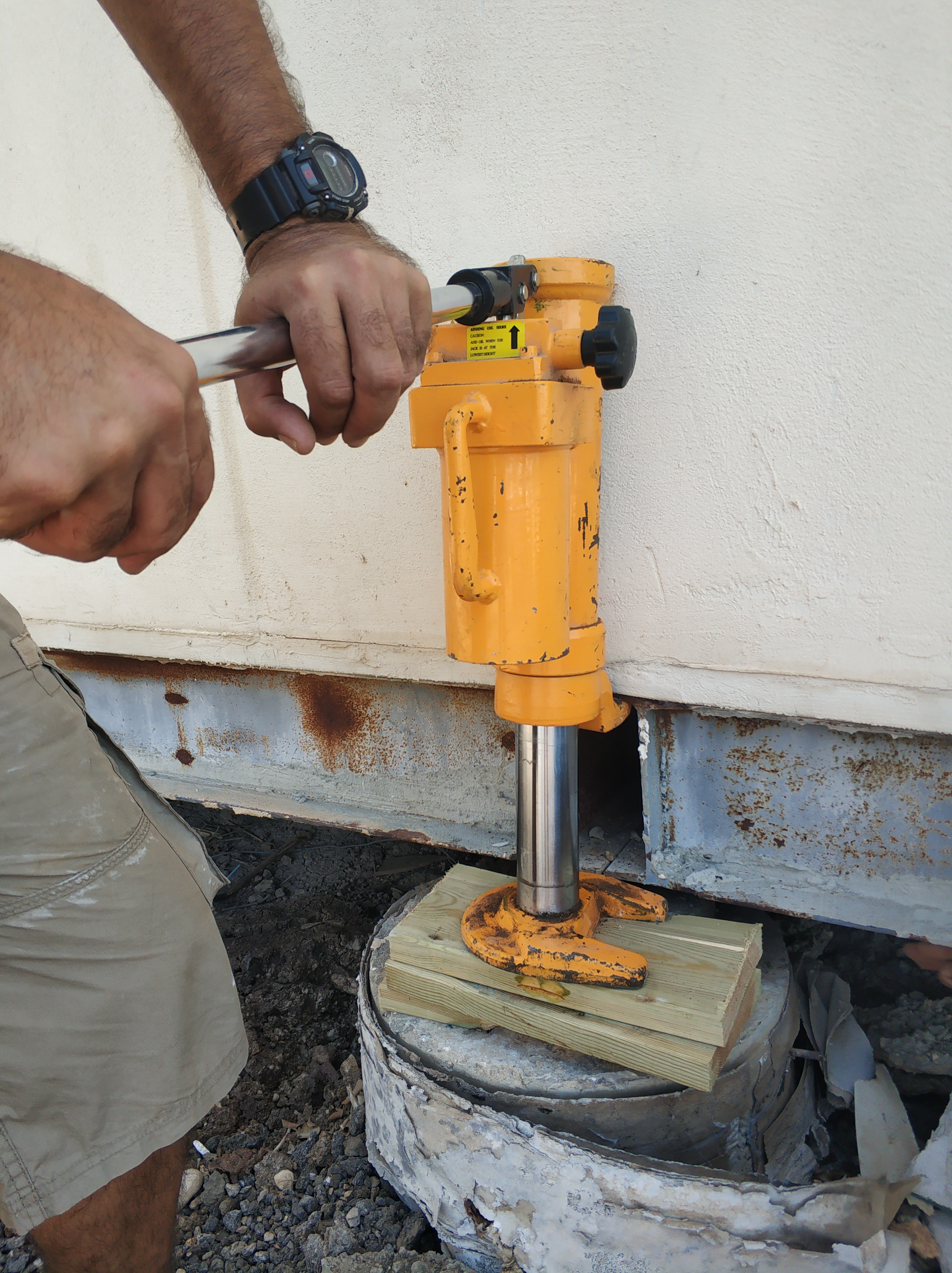
A jack which can lift a mobile home

A jack is a mechanical lifting device. Most often, the term "jack" denotes equipment used to apply great forces or lift heavy loads. There are also smaller, more delicate jacks used as part of the action of keyboard instruments.

Of the jacks of the first category (heavy lifting), a mechanical jack employs a screw thread. A hydraulic jack uses hydraulic power. The most common function of a jack is as a car jack, floor jack or garage jack, which lift vehicles so that maintenance can be performed. Jacks are usually rated for a maximum lifting capacity (for example, 1.5 tons or 3 tons). Industrial jacks can be rated for many tons of load.

== Etymology ==
The personal name Jack came in the 16th century to be used as a colloquial word for 'a man (of low status)' (much as in the modern usage 'jack of all trades, master of none'). From here, the word was 'applied to things which in some way take the place of a lad or man, or save human labour'. The first attestation in the Oxford English Dictionary of jack in the sense 'a machine, usually portable, for lifting heavy weights by force acting from below' is from 1679, referring to 'an Engine used for the removing and commodious placing of great Timber.'

== Jackscrew ==
=== Scissor jack ===
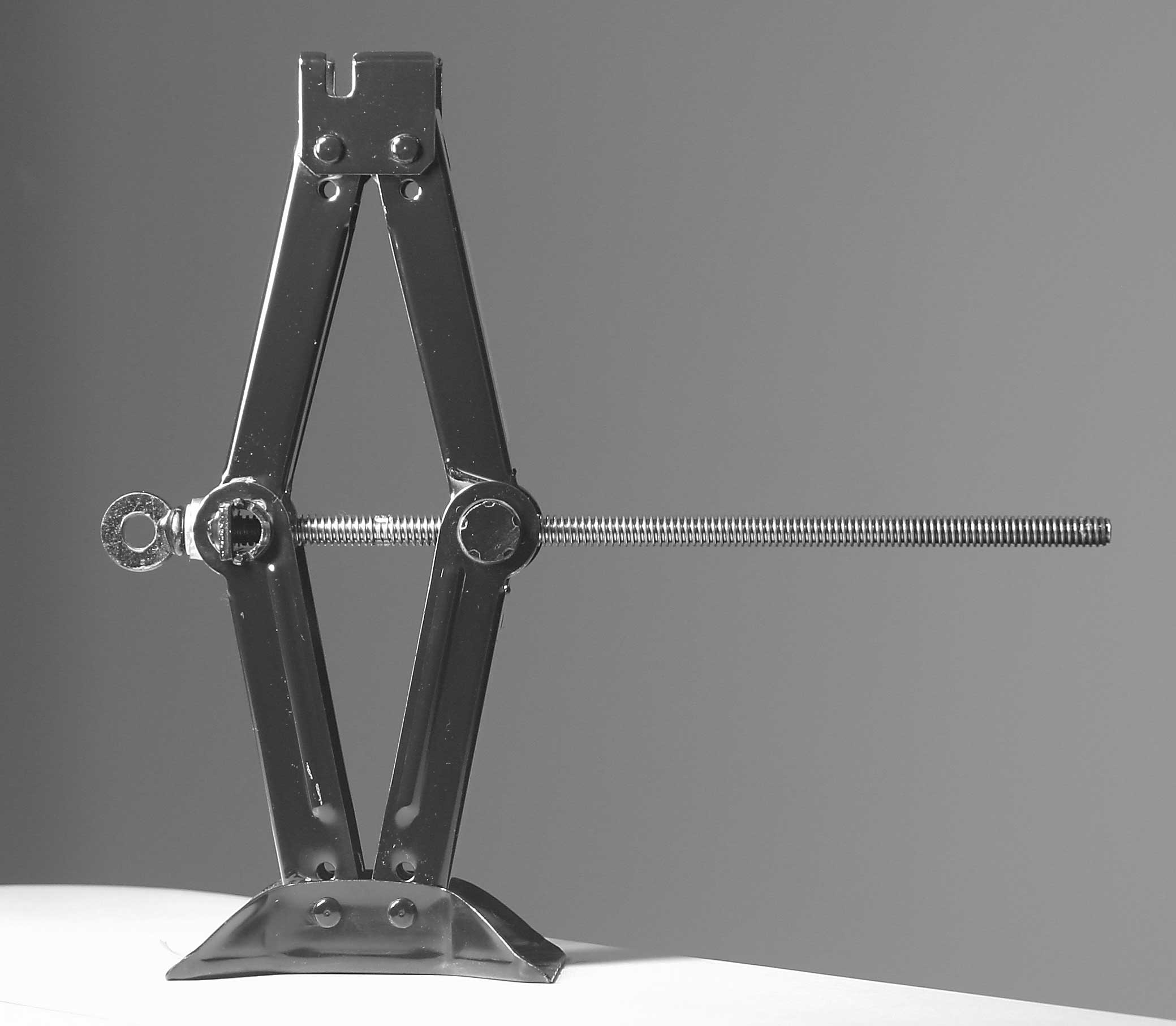
Jackscrews are integral to the scissor jack, one of the simplest kinds of car jack still used.

A scissor jack uses the mechanical advantage of a leadscrew and 4-bar linkage to allow a human to lift a vehicle by manual force alone. They are inexpensive and are common in manufacturer-supplied breakdown kits. The jack shown is made for a modern vehicle and the notch fits into a jack-up point on a unibody. Earlier versions have a platform to lift on a vehicle's frame or axle.

A well-engineered jack employs an acme thread for efficient winding without the jack losing its position when under load.

Electrically operated car scissor jacks are powered by 12-volt electricity supplied directly from the car's cigarette lighter receptacle. The electrical energy is used to power these car jacks to raise and lower automatically. Electric jacks require less effort from the motorist for operation.

=== House jack ===
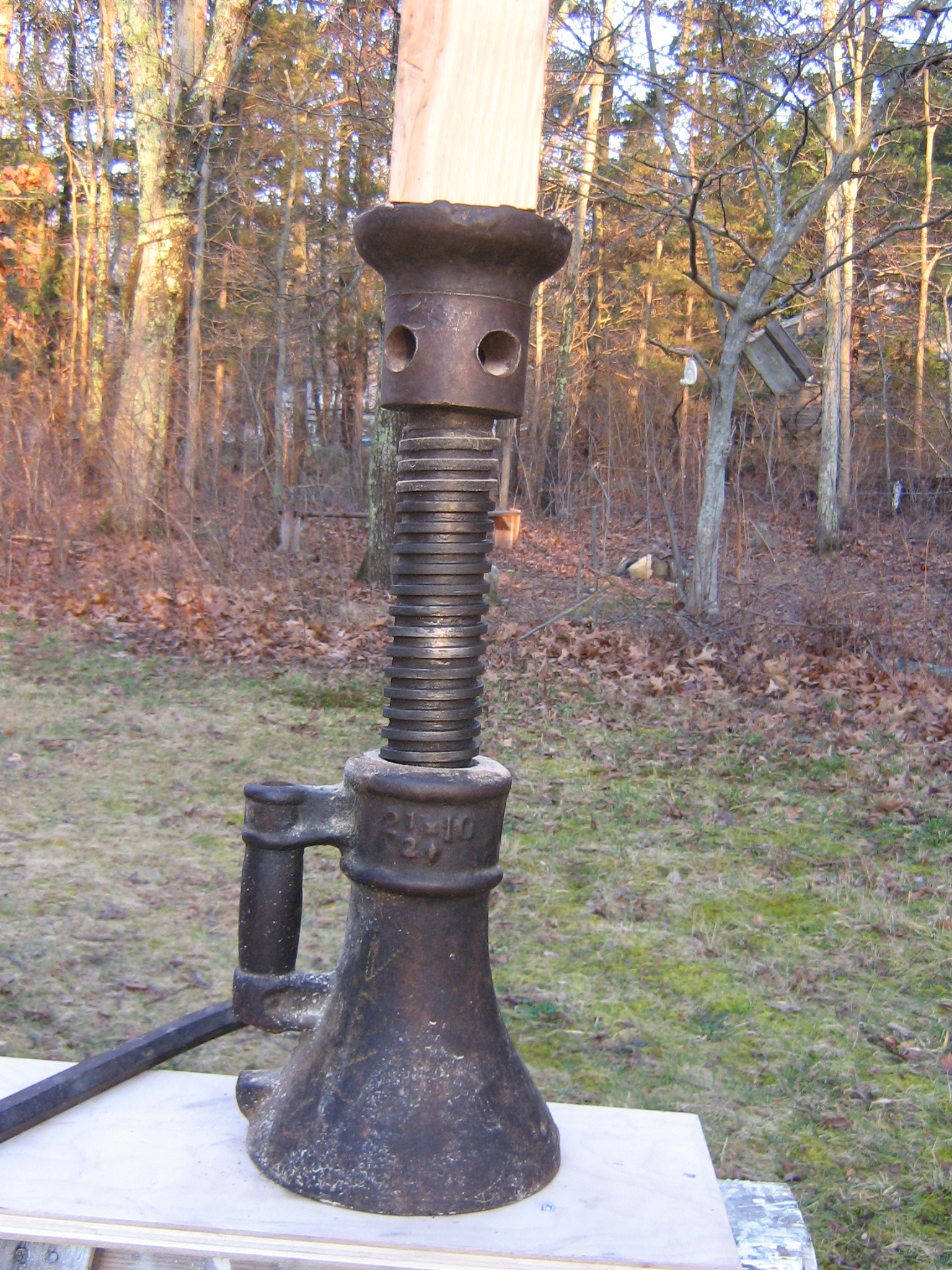
A house jack, standing 24 in (61 cm) from top to bottom when fully extended, capable of lifting 2.5 tons

A house jack (also called a screw jack) is a mechanical device primarily used to lift buildings from their foundations for repairs or relocation. After employing a series of jacks, wood cribbing temporarily supports the structure. This process is repeated until the desired height is reached. The house jack can be used for raising carrying beams that have settled, or for installing new structural beams. On top of the jack is a cast-iron circular pad upon which the jacking post rests. The pad moves independently of the house jack so that it does not turn as the acme-threaded rod is turned with a metal rod. This piece tilts very slightly, but not enough to render the post dangerously out of plumb.

== Hydraulic jack ==
The working principle of a hydraulic jack

In 1838, William Joseph Curtis filed a patent in Britain for a hydraulic jack. In 1859, inventor Richard Dudgeon was granted a patent for a "portable hydraulic press" — the hydraulic jack. This jack proved to be vastly superior to the screw jacks in use at the time.

Hydraulic jacks are typically used for shop work, rather than as an emergency jack to be carried with the vehicle. Use of jacks not designed for a specific vehicle requires more than the usual care in selecting ground conditions, the jacking point on a vehicle, and ensuring stability when the jack is extended. Hydraulic jacks are often used to lift elevators in low and medium-rise buildings.

A hydraulic jack uses a liquid, which is incompressible, that is forced into a cylinder by a pump plunger. Most often, the liquid of choice is oil, since it is self-lubricating and stable. When the plunger pulls back, it draws oil out of the reservoir through a suction check valve into the pump chamber. When the plunger moves forward, it pushes the oil through a discharge check valve into the cylinder. The suction valve ball is within the chamber and opens with each draw of the plunger. The discharge valve ball is outside the chamber and opens when the oil is pushed into the cylinder. At this point, the suction ball within the chamber is forced shut, and oil pressure builds in the cylinder.

=== Floor jack ===
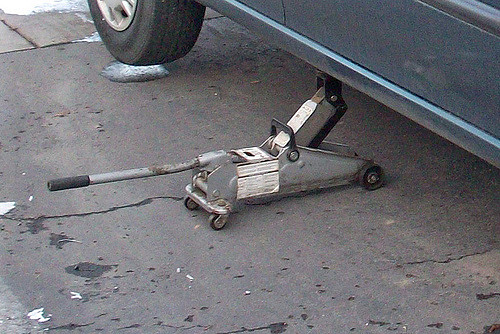
Floor jack for a motor vehicle

Within a floor jack (a.k.a. trolley jack), a horizontal piston pushes on the short end of a bellcrank. The long arm provides the vertical motion to a lifting pad, kept horizontal with a horizontal linkage. Floor jacks usually include casters and wheels, allowing compensation for the arc taken by the lifting pad, so may only be used on a hard, smooth, level floor. This mechanism provides a low profile when collapsed, for easy maneuvering underneath the vehicle, while allowing considerable extension.

=== Bottle jack ===
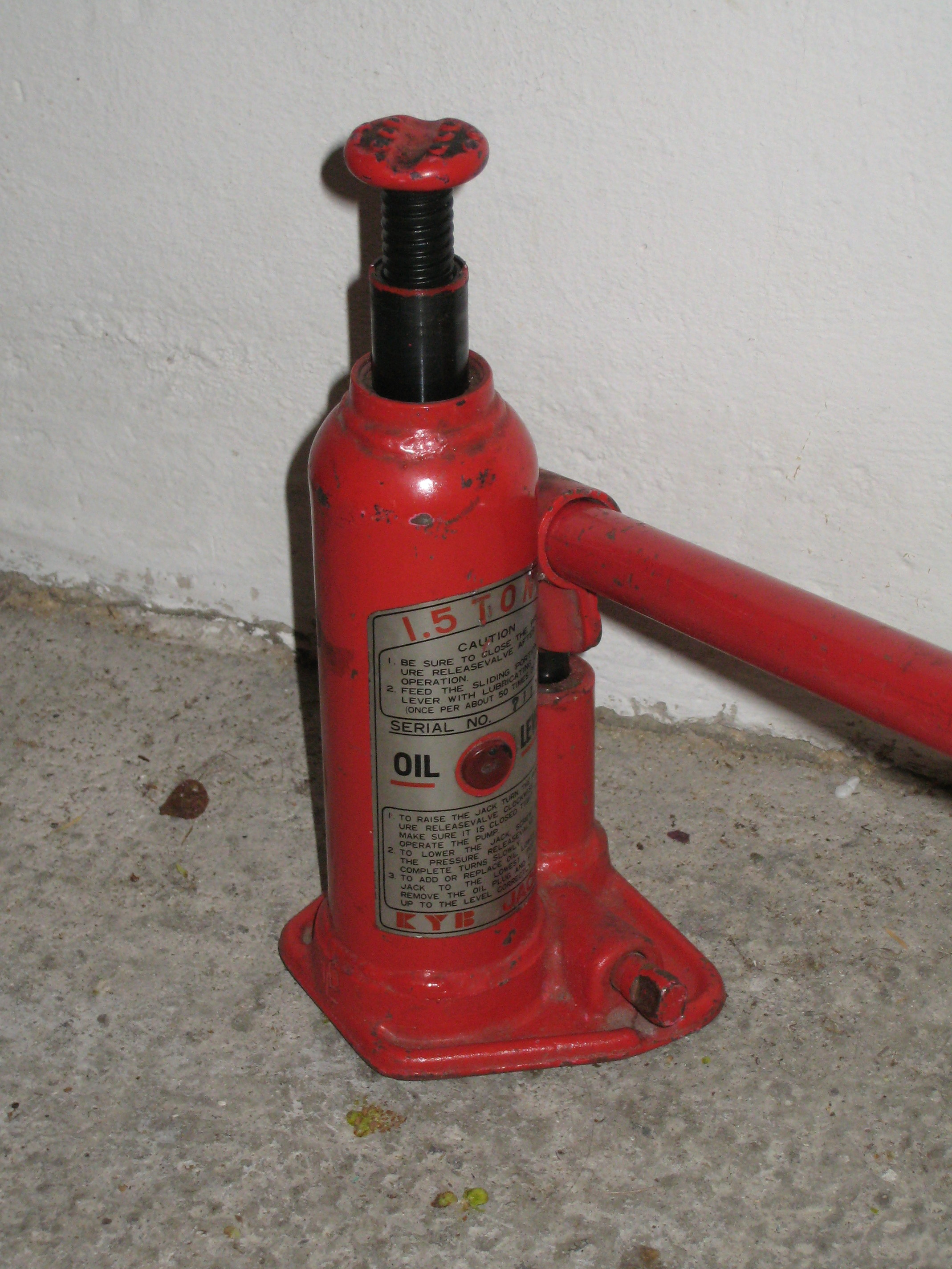
Hydraulic bottle jack

A bottle jack (a.k.a. whiskey jack) resembles a bottle in shape, having a cylindrical body and a neck. Within is a vertical lifting ram with a support pad of some kind fixed to the top. The jack may be hydraulic or work by screw action. In the hydraulic version, the hydraulic ram emerges from the body vertically by hydraulic pressure provided by a pump either on the baseplate or at a remote location via a pressure hose. With a single-action piston, the lift range is somewhat limited, so its use for lifting vehicles is limited to those with a relatively high clearance. For lifting structures such as houses, the hydraulic interconnection of multiple vertical jacks through valves enables the even distribution of forces while enabling close control of the lift.

The screw version of the bottle jack works by turning a large nut running on the threaded vertical ram at the neck of the body. The nut has gear teeth and is generally turned by a bevel gear spigotted to the body, the bevel gear being turned manually by a jack handle fitting into a square socket. The ram may have a second screwed ram within it, which doubles the lifting range telescopically.

Bottle jacks have a capacity of up to 50 tons and may be used to lift a variety of objects. Typical uses include the repair of automobiles and house foundations. Larger, heavy-duty models may be known as a barrel jack.

This type of jack is best used for short vertical lifts. Blocks may be used to repeat the operation when a greater amount of elevation is required.

== Pneumatic jack ==
=== Air hydraulic jack ===
An air hydraulic jack is a hydraulic jack that is actuated by compressed air – for example, air from a compressor – instead of human work. This eliminates the need for the user to actuate the hydraulic mechanism, saving effort and potentially increasing speed. Sometimes, such jacks can also be operated by the standard hydraulic actuation method, thereby retaining functionality, even if a source of compressed air is not available.

=== Inflatable jack ===
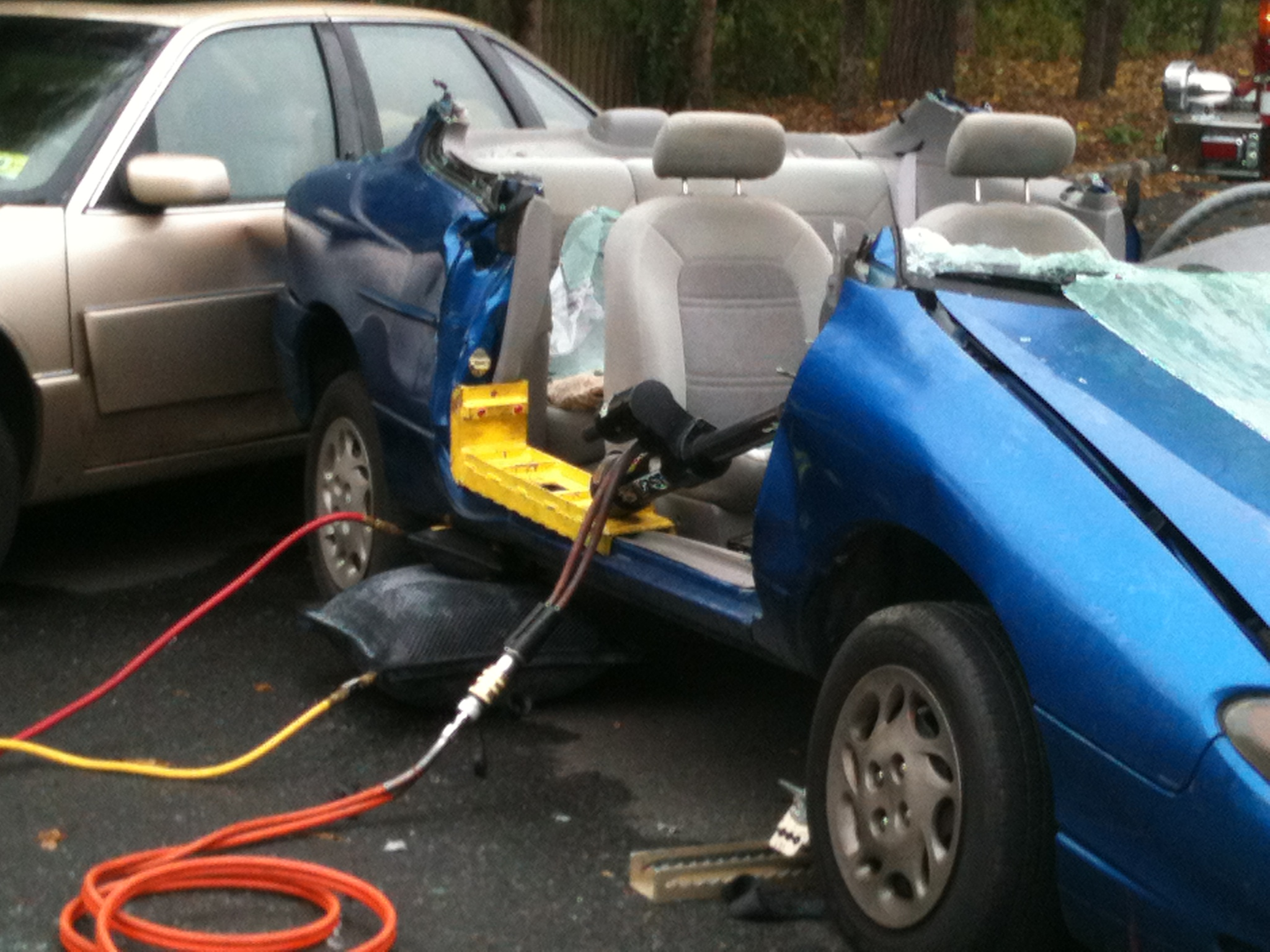
A demonstration of using two stacked air bags to lift the rear of a car

An inflatable jack, flat jack, lifting bag, car exhaust jack or pneumatic lifting bag is an air bag that is inflated by compressed air (without a hydraulic component) in order to lift objects. The bag can be deflated to be reused later. The objects can be of a smaller load such as an automobile or it can be a larger object such as an airplane.

Rescuers also use airbags to lift heavy objects to help victims who are trapped under those objects. There are three main types of lifting bags for rescue: high-pressure, medium-pressure and low-pressure systems. Low-pressure bags are operated at 7.25 psi for high vertical lift in a large surface area but lower lifting capacities. Medium-pressure bags are operated at 15 psi. High-pressure bags which have higher lifting capacities are operated at pressure between 90 and 145 psi. Two air bags can be stacked together to provide a higher lift. It is recommended that no more than two bags can be used in a stacked configuration; the bigger bag must be the bottom one, and no other objects are inserted between the stacked bags. Incorrect use of stacked bags may result in a bag (or other objects) shooting out to create a dangerous projectile.

== Strand jack ==
A strand jack is a specialized hydraulic jack that grips steel cables. Often used in concert, strand jacks can lift hundreds of tons and are used in engineering and construction.

== Farm jack ==
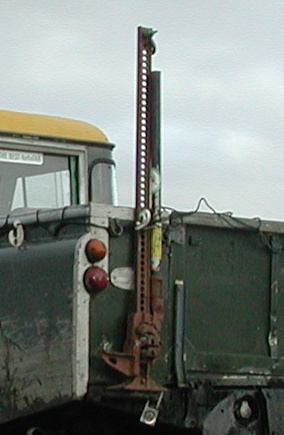
A farm jack attached to a vehicle

The farm jack also known as a railroad jack, high lift jack, handyman jack, trail jack or kanga-jack was invented in 1905 by P. J. Harrah. It consists of a steel beam with a series of equally spaced holes along its length, and a hand-operated mechanism which can be moved from one end of the beam to the other through the use of a pair of climbing pins. Typical sizes for the farm jack are 4 ft (1.2 m), 5 ft (1.5 m)and 6 ft (1.8 m) referring to the length of the beam.

The jack's versatility stems from its use for such applications as lifting, winching, clamping, pulling and pushing. It is this versatility, along with the long travel it offers and its relative portability, which make the farm jack so popular with off-road drivers.

== Safety standards ==
National and international standards have been developed to standardize the safety and performance requirements for jacks and other lifting devices. The selection of the standard is an agreement between the purchaser and the manufacturer and plays a significant role in the design of the jack. The American Society of Mechanical Engineers (ASME) in the US developed the Safety Standard for Portable Automotive Service Equipment (ISBN 9780791876954). Last revised in 2024, it includes requirements for hydraulic hand jacks, transmission jacks, emergency tire changing jacks, service jacks, forklift jacks, and other lifting devices.

== In musical instruments ==
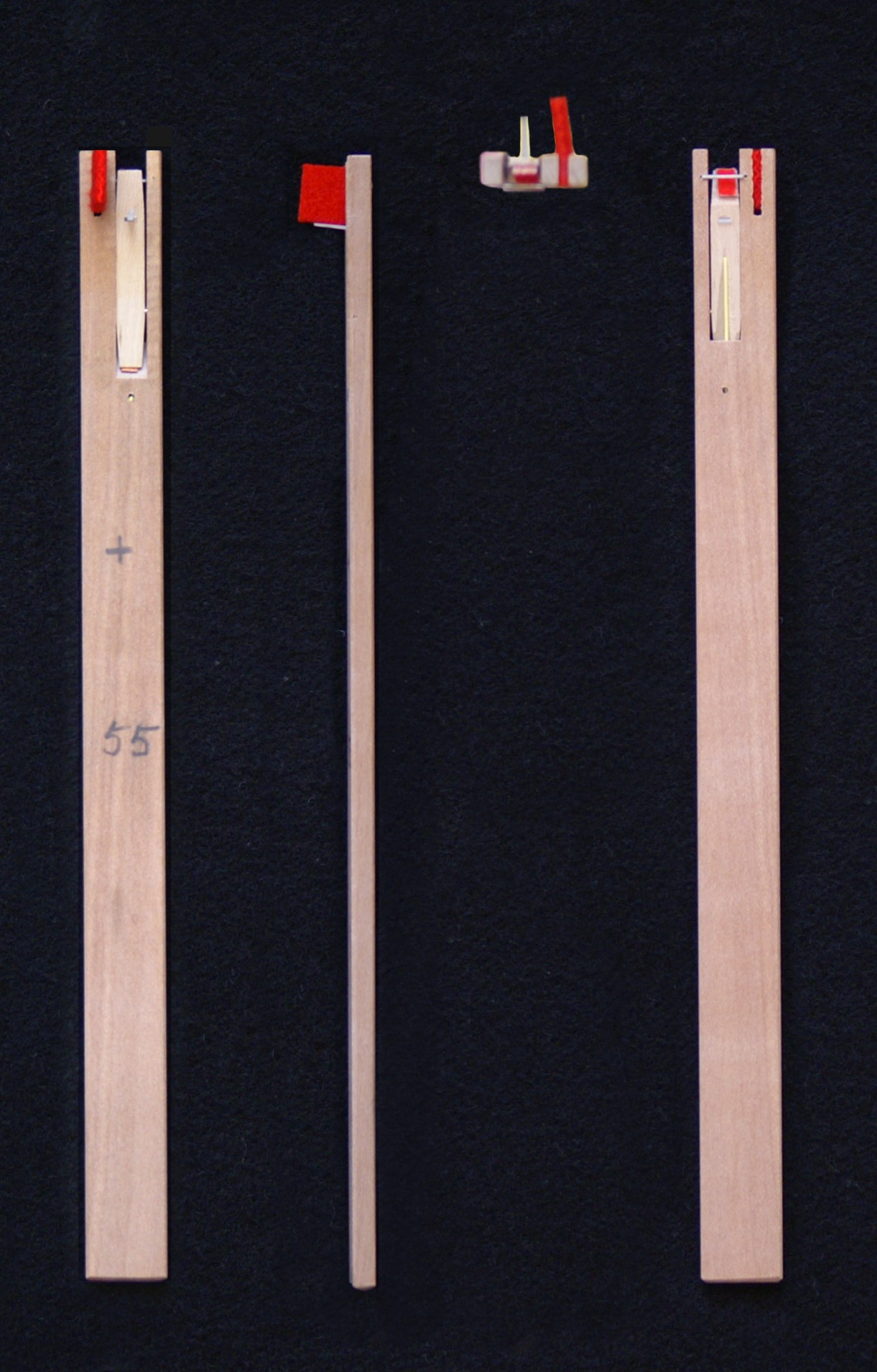
Views of a harpsichord jack. For how it functions, see harpsichord

"Jack" in the context of musical instruments may refer to part of a piano action, which lifts other action parts in the course of sending the hammer toward the string. In a harpsichord, jacks are small strips of wood that lift the plectrum so that it can pluck the string.

Small bottle jacks are used to lift pianos short distances, for instance in attaching wheels or installing protective pads for flooring.

== See also ==
- Pallet jack
- Lift slab construction
