= Richard Dudgeon =

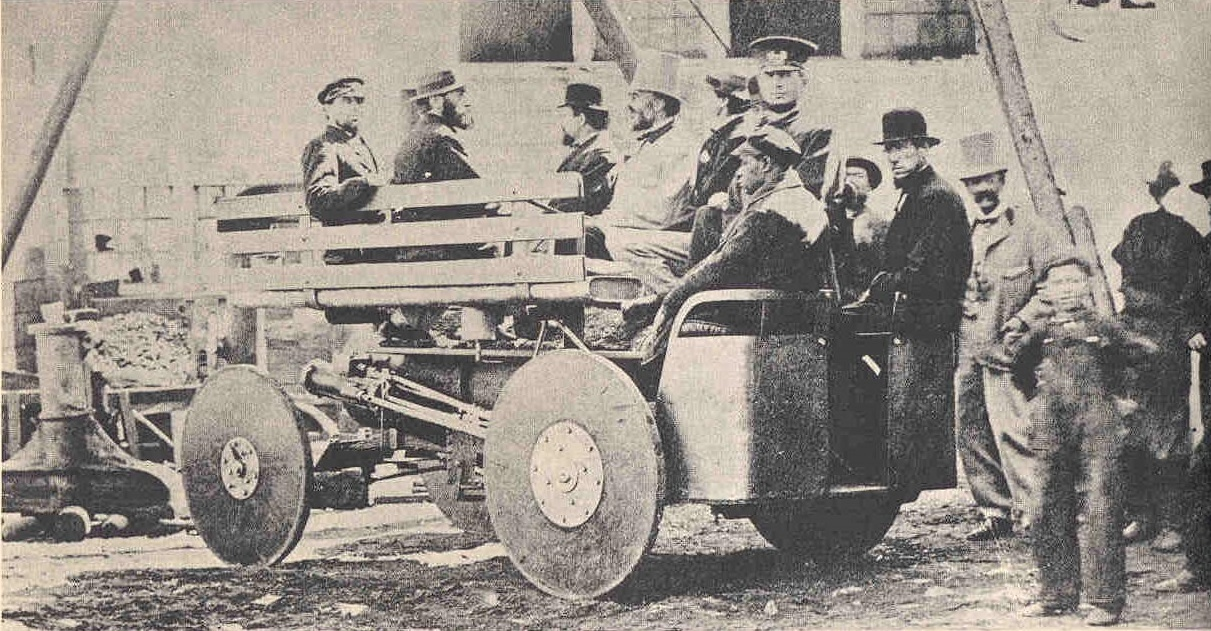
Dudgeon Steam Automobile (1857)

Richard Dudgeon (1819, Tain – 9 April 1895, New York City) was a mechanic, noted for his inventions of the hydraulic jack and steam carriage. Born in Scotland, he emigrated as a boy with his family to the United States, where he became a mechanic in New York. He founded an engineering machine shop on Broome Street and this prospered, so that he was able to live well nearby and have a country estate in Harlem. The business still exists as Richard Dudgeon, Inc.
