= Keith Dudgeon (Australian cricketer) =

Australian cricketer

Personal information
- Full name: Keith Edward Dudgeon
- Born: 5 September 1946 (age 80); Cairns, Australia
- Batting: Right-handed
- Bowling: Right-arm medium

Domestic team information
- Years: Team
- 1968/69–1974/75: Queensland

Career statistics
| Competition | FC | List A |
|---|---|---|
| Matches | 41 | 8 |
| Runs scored | 1,576 | 156 |
| Batting average | 22.84 | 26.00 |
| 100s/50s | 0/9 | 0/0 |
| Top score | 85 | 43 |
| Balls bowled | 760 | 152 |
| Wickets | 15 | 3 |
| Bowling average | 24.33 | 42.66 |
| 5 wickets in innings | 0 | 0 |
| 10 wickets in match | 0 | – |
| Best bowling | 2/14 | 2/21 |
| Catches/stumpings | 19/– | 1/– |
- Source: Cricinfo, 22 October 2026

Keith Edward Dudgeon (born 5 September 1946) is an Australian former cricketer. He played 41 first-class matches for Queensland between 1967 and 1975. This period is considered as 'not the best era for the Queensland Bulls', as the team came last in the Sheffield Shield competition eight times during the late 1960s and mid 1970s.

Dudgeon played as a right-hand batsman and medium-pace bowler, scoring a total of 1,576 first-class runs at an average of 22.84, across 77 innings. His highest score was 85, and he scored nine scores of 50 runs or more across the course of his first-class career. In his debut match, played against Western Australia at the WACA, he scored 59 runs in the first innings, but was forced to retire hurt on 1 in the second innings after being struck in the head off a short delivery bowled by Graham McKenzie. His score of 85 came in 1971, again at the WACA ground against Western Australia, and his innings was finally ended with a catch taken by Rod Marsh off the bowling of Dennis Lillee.

He also took 15 first-class wickets at an average of 24.33, with his best figures being 2/14, taken against South Australia at the Gabba in 1971. In 1968, while playing an Tour Match hosting the West Indies, Dudgeon took the wickets of Basil Butcher and Wes Hall, after the former had claimed Dudgeon's wicket earlier in the match. Following that tour of Australia, the commentator Richie Benaud noted that Butcher was 'the most difficult of all West Indians to dismiss'. In November 1970, Dudgeon removed the English opener John Edrich who was playing for the Marylebone Cricket Club.

Following his retirement from playing cricket, Dudgeon opened a specialist cricketing shop in the Brisbane suburb of The Gap, which has been in operation since 1980. Through this business Keith and his family support local cricket teams, such as the Valley District Cricket Club.
