= South African cricket team in Australia in 1910–11 =

International cricket tour

- Date: November 1910 — March 1911
- Location: Australia
- Result: Australia won the 5-Test series 4-1
Teams
- Australia: South Africa
Captains
Most runs
- Victor Trumper (661): Aubrey Faulkner (732)
Most wickets
- Bill Whitty (37): Reggie Schwarz (25)

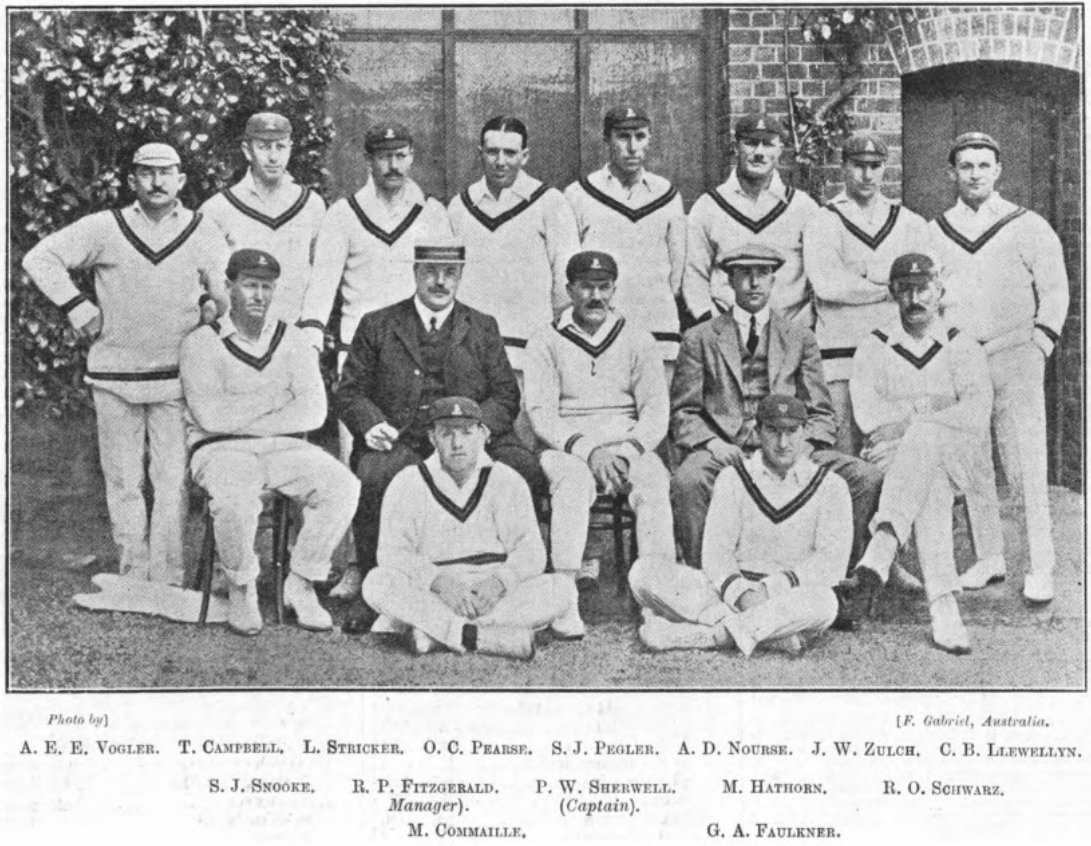
The South African team that toured Australia in 1910–11.

The South Africa national cricket team toured Australia from November 1910 to March 1911 to play five test matches against Australia. This was the South Africans first tour of Australia and the second tour between the two nations after the Australia tour of South Africa in late 1902.

Before the first test, the South Africans played in five warm-up matches before the first test. Australia would win the opening two tests of the series in Sydney and Melbourne, before South Africa recorded their first test win against Australia in the third test at Adelaide by 28 runs. Three more tour matches against Tasmania and Victoria were played before the fourth test in Melbourne where the Australians won the series by 530 runs. After a tour match against New South Wales a week prior, the South Africans would go on to lose the final test match by seven wickets.

Aubrey Faulkner was leading the run scorer for the series with 732 runs from ten innings, while the leading wicket taker was Australian bowler Bill Whitty who took 37 wickets in ten innings.

== Background ==
The 1910–11 series was the first time that the South Africans had toured Australia. This was also the second series between these nations with the first tour being the 1902–03 tour of South Africa where Australia had won the series 2–0. For the South Africans, their last series was at home to England in 1909-10 with the South Africans recording a 3–2 series victory. Leading into the tour, the South Africans touring team did play two matches in South Africa against Transvaal and Western Province before they left aboard HMS Commonwealth to head to Australia. Australia on the other hand had won their last series 2–1 against England back in the 1909 Ashes series.

=== Squads ===
Tests
Australia	South Africa
Warwick Armstrong; Warren Bardsley; Sammy Carter; Tibby Cotter; Algy Gehrs; Clem Hill; Ranji Hordern; Charles Kelleway; Charles Macartney; Vernon Ransford; Victor Trumper; Bill Whitty	Aubrey Faulkner; Maitland Hathorn; Charlie Llewellyn; Dave Nourse; Ormy Pearse; Sid Pegler; Reggie Schwarz; Percy Sherwell; Jimmy Sinclair; Tip Snooke; Louis Stricker; Bert Vogler; Billy Zulch

== Tour matches ==
=== South Africa vs. South Australia ===
The first game of the tour for the South Africans was a trip over to South Australia as they took on the South Australians. After being sent into bat, the South Africans were bowled over for only 133 with some people stating that the tourists were being treaty fairly. In response, South Australia could only get 183 which meant that they held a fifty run lead with Reggie Schwarz taking six wickets. Dave Nourse and Louis Stricker then guided the South Africans on Day 2 with a 242 run partnership with the first 100 of those being scored over 67 minutes. Stricker who was playing his first tour outside of Africa would score 146 which would be his highest score in first-class cricket. Though Nourse would go and score 201 as he would give South Australia a target of 458 runs which South Australia fall 281 runs short as Schwarz took another five wicket haul.

4–8 November 1910
Scorecard

South Africans	v	South Australia
133 (46 overs); Aubrey Faulkner 54; Bill Whitty 4/57 (21)		183 (51 overs); Jack Crawford 66; Reggie Schwarz 6/66 (20)
507 (114.5 overs); Dave Nourse 201; Albert Wright 3/66 (22 overs)		176 (41.5 overs); Algy Gehrs 60; Reggie Schwarz 5/64 (16)

South Africans won by 281 runs
Adelaide Oval, Adelaide
Umpires: FJC Thomas and GA Watson

- South Australia won the toss and elected to field.
- Day 1 was washed out.

=== South Africa vs. Victoria ===
Three days later the South Africans headed to Melbourne for the second tour match with it being against the Victorians. After the first day play was mainly washed out except for a brief period in the morning, the South Africans could only score 189 which was aided with a 106 run partnership between Nourse and Aubrey Faulkner. Victoria opened their innings at 4:50pm and would see Tom Warne ending the second day one run short of his half-century. He would go on to finish on 84 as him, Bert Kortlang and Jimmy Matthews all scoring fifties as Victoria scored 301 just before 5pm local time. Bert Vogler being the pick of the bowlers as he took five wickets.

Victoria was then set a target of only 125 runs when the South Africans were all bowled out for 236 with Matthews taking another three wickets while Frank Laver had two chances go begging. For the South Africans, Faulkner top scored for the South Africans with 69 which included another 80+ run partnership between him ad Nourse. Though this was aided by the tail contributing in what The Age described as having "no tail". The Victorians went on to win the match by five wickets, with top scorer Barlow Carkeek scoring the winning runs for Victoria at 12:10 local time. 23,598 attended the match across the five days as the South Africans went on the train off to New South Wales for the next tour game which was only two days away.

11–16 November 1910
Scorecard

South Africans	v	Victoria
189 (72.3 overs); Dave Nourse 51; Jimmy Matthews 3/13 (7.3)		301 (108.4 overs); Tom Warne 84; Bert Vogler 5/104 (35.4)
236 (102.5 overs); Aubrey Faulkner 69; Jimmy Matthews 3/33 (18)		5/126 (31 overs); Barlow Carkeek 38; Reggie Schwarz 2/54 (12)

Victoria won by 5 wickets
Melbourne Cricket Ground, Melbourne
Umpires: FJC Thomas and GA Watson

- South Africans won the toss and elected to bat.
- Day 1 was mostly washed out

=== South Africa vs. New South Wales ===
The South Africans next took on New South Wales in Sydney. Once again batting first, the South Africans scored 300 with Faulkner and Striker each scoring 70s which the pair also played in a partnership of 82 runs. Charles Kelleway was the leading wicket taker in the innings with five wickets which included the wicket of Striker. New South Wales in response got off to a good start by the end of the opening day at 70 without loss in what would be later be a 122 run partnership between Victor Trumper and Warren Bardsley. For Warren his 70 would come off only 69 minutes before caught off a delivery from Bert Vogler. This partnership would be the backbone in Day 2, but consist wickets from the South Africans brought them back into the match and gave them a lead of only 13 runs with Faulkner claiming five wickets. The crowd applauded the Bert Folkard performance on the third day as he took a six-wicket haul with him being a major assistance in restricting the South Africans to only 198 which the hosts would go on to win the match by three wickets with Trumper again top scoring with 78.

18–21 November 1910
Scorecard

South Africans	v	New South Wales
300 (75.5 overs); Aubrey Faulkner 74; Charles Kelleway 5/60 (24.5)		287 (65.1 overs); Victor Trumper 70; Aubrey Faulkner 5/40 (13)
198 (74 overs); Ormerod Pearse 52*; Bert Folkard 6/37 (26)		7/212 (45.3 overs); Victor Trumper 78; Reggie Schwarz 2/42 (9)

New South Wales won by 3 wickets
Sydney Cricket Ground, Sydney
Umpires: WJ Bruton and WG Curran

- South Africans won the toss and elected to bat.

=== South Africa vs. Queensland ===
25–28 November 1910
Scorecard

South Africans	v	Queensland
202 (47.2 overs); Aubrey Faulkner 54; John McLaren 5/55 (18)		145 (44.1 overs); Alan Marshal 50; Aubrey Faulkner 5/32 (16.1)
382 (83 overs); Billy Zulch 99; Charles Barstow 3/68 (17)		317 (77.4 overs); Claude Jennings 67; Aubrey Faulkner 5/106 (28)

South Africans won by 122 runs
Brisbane Cricket Ground, Brisbane
Umpires: GA Carter and WH Carvosso

- South Africans won the toss and elected to bat.

== Test series summary ==
=== First Test ===
9–14 December 1910
(Timeless Test)
Scorecard

Australia	v	South Africa
528 (109.4 overs); C Hill 191; RO Schwarz 5/102 (25 overs)		174 (68 overs); GA Faulkner 62; A Cotter 6/69 (20 overs)
		240 (f/o) (67.1 overs); AW Nourse 64*; WJ Whitty 4/75 (21 overs)

Australia won by an innings and 114 runs
Sydney Cricket Ground, Sydney
Umpires: RM Crockett and WG Curran

- Australia won the toss and elected to bat.
- 11 December was taken as a rest day
- There was no play on the third day.
- C Kelleway (AUS) and COC Pearse (SA) made their Test debuts.

=== Second Test ===
31 December 1910–4 January 1911
(Timeless Test)
Scorecard

Australia	v	South Africa
348 (79.4 overs); W Bardsley 85; GA Faulkner 2/34 (10.4 overs)		506 (153 overs); GA Faulkner 204; WW Armstrong 4/134 (48 overs)
327 (79.3 overs); VT Trumper 159; RO Schwarz 4/76 (22 overs)		80 (32 overs); CB Llewellyn 17; WJ Whitty 6/17 (16 overs)

Australia won by 89 runs
Melbourne Cricket Ground, Melbourne
Umpires: RM Crockett and W Hannah

- Australia won the toss and elected to bat.
- 1 January was taken as a rest day

=== Third Test ===
7–13 January 1911
(Timeless Test)
Scorecard

South Africa	v	Australia
482 (166.4 overs); JW Zulch 105; WW Armstrong 4/103 (42.4 overs)		465 (119.5 overs); VT Trumper 214*; CB Llewellyn 4/107 (31 overs)
360 (130.2 overs); GA Faulkner 115; WJ Whitty 6/104 (39.2 overs)		339 (83.4 overs); C Kelleway 65; RO Schwarz 4/48 (15 overs)

South Africa won by 38 runs
Adelaide Oval, Adelaide
Umpires: RM Crockett and GA Watson

- South Africa won the toss and elected to bat.
- 8 January was taken as a rest day
- This was South Africa's first test victory on foreign soil.

=== Fourth Test ===
17–21 February 1911
(Timeless Test)
Scorecard

Australia	v	South Africa
328 (94.4 overs); W Bardsley 82; SJ Pegler 3/40 (17.4 overs)		205 (62.5 overs); AW Nourse 92*; WJ Whitty 4/78 (22 overs)
578 (126.2 overs); WW Armstrong 132; AEE Vogler 3/59 (15 overs)		171 (40.2 overs); GA Faulkner 80; HV Hordern 5/66 (14.2 overs)

Australia won by 530 runs
Melbourne Cricket Ground, Melbourne
Umpires: RM Crockett and W Hannah

- South Africa won the toss and elected to field.
- 19 February was taken as a rest day.
- HV Hordern (AUS) made his Test debut.

=== Fifth Test ===
3–7 March 1911
(Timeless Test)
Scorecard

Australia	v	South Africa
364 (96.4 overs); CG Macartney 137; RO Schwarz 6/47 (11.4 overs)		160 (50.1 overs); GA Faulkner 52; HV Hordern 4/73 (21 overs)
198/3 (43.1 overs); VT Trumper 74*; AW Nourse 2/32 (8.1 overs)		401 (f/o) (122.1 overs); JW Zulch 150; WJ Whitty 4/66 (27 overs)

Australia won by 7 wickets
Sydney Cricket Ground, Sydney
Umpires: RM Crockett and AC Jones

- South Africa won the toss and elected to field.
- 5 March was taken as a rest day

== Statistics ==
After all five tests were played, South African batsman, Aubrey Faulkner ended the series with the most runs with 732 runs from ten innings with highest score being a double century in the second test in Melbourne. He finished ahead of two Australians in Victor Trumper (661 runs) and Warren Bardsley (573 runs). For bowling, the leading wicket taker was Australian bowler Bill Whitty who took 37 wickets which included a 6/17 in the second test match which was held in Sydney. He finished ahead of South African bowler, Reggie Schwarz who took 25 wickets with Tibby Cotter rounding out the top three with 22.

=== Most runs ===
Player	Team	Matches	Innings	Not Out	Runs	HS	Average	100s	50s
Aubrey Faulkner	South Africa	5	10	0	732	204	73.20	2	5
Victor Trumper	Australia	5	9	2	661	214*	94.42	2	2
Warren Bardsley	Australia	5	9	0	573	132	63.66	1	5
Clem Hill	Australia	5	8	0	425	191	53.12	2	1
Warwick Armstrong	Australia	5	8	0	410	132	51.25	1	1

=== Most wickets ===
Player	Team	Matches	Overs	Runs	Wickets	Average	BBI
Bill Whitty	Australia	5	232.3	632	37	17.08	6/17
Reggie Schwarz	South Africa	5	167.4	651	25	26.04	6/47
Tibby Cotter	Australia	5	194.5	633	22	28.77	6/69
H. V. Hordern	Australia	2	80.3	295	14	21.07	5/66
Charlie Llewellyn	South Africa	5	131	559	14	39.92	4/81
