= 1912 Triangular Tournament =

- Date: 27 May – 22 August 1912
- Location: England
- Result: England won the nine-match tournament 4–2–0
Teams
England	Australia	South Africa
Captains
C. B. Fry	Syd Gregory	Frank Mitchell
Most runs
Jack Hobbs (391) Wilfred Rhodes (263)	Warren Bardsley (392); Charles Kelleway (360)	Dave Nourse (220); Aubrey Faulkner (194)
Most wickets
Sydney Barnes (39) Frank Woolley (17)	Bill Whitty (25); Gerry Hazlitt (19)	Sid Pegler (29); Aubrey Faulkner (17)

The 1912 Triangular Tournament was a Test cricket competition played between Australia, England and South Africa, the only Test-playing nations at the time.

The ultimate winners of the tournament were England, with four wins in their six matches, but the tournament was deemed a failure, with disappointing crowds and uncompetitive cricket, caused in part by a weakened Australia team.

The tournament was the first tournament in Test history to be played between more than two nations. It was the only such tournament until the Asian Test Championships of 1998–99 and 2001–02, and the ICC World Test Championship which began in 2019.

== Background ==
The idea of a competition involving all three of the nations then playing Test cricket (Australia, England and South Africa) was proposed at the first meeting of the Imperial Cricket Conference in July 1909. The original proposal was for a tournament to be held every four years, with the first hosted by England in 1912.

For a variety of reasons, the tournament was not a success. The summer was one of the wettest since records began in 1766: rainfall in the three months of June, July and August was more than twice the seasonal average, and August, 1912, was the coolest, dullest and wettest August of the 20th century. At that time, pitches were not covered to protect them against rain, so the batsmen were at a distinct disadvantage on the proverbial sticky wicket. These problems were exacerbated since Tests in England were in those days played over three days rather than the five days that is now usual. Two of the matches between England and Australia were drawn due to the weather, with the final match being played on a pitch said to be

better suited to water polo.

In addition, disputes between the players and management in Australia meant that six leading Australian players refused to tour (Note: These six were Victor Trumper, Vernon Ransford, Clem Hill, Warwick Armstrong, Hanson Carter and Albert Cotter, of whom only Armstrong and Carter would again play for Australia.) whilst medical duties meant “Ranji” Hordern, easily Australia's best bowler in the 1911–12 Ashes series, could not tour either. These setbacks severely weakened a team that had otherwise been level with England in recent Ashes series. The leg spin and googly bowlers in the South African team were very effective on the matting pitches then in use in South Africa, but were less deadly on English grass pitches. As a result, England dominated, winning four of their six matches and drawing the other two.

Finally, the British public showed little interest: in the words of The Daily Telegraph:

Nine Tests provide a surfeit of cricket, and contests between Australia and South Africa are not a great attraction to the British public.

The tournament was so unsuccessful that it has never been repeated. The idea of a tournament of international cricket matches between more than two countries was not repeated, outside of regional tournaments in East Africa and the West Indies, until the invention of One Day International cricket and the first Women's Cricket World Cup in 1973. The only other Test cricket tournaments in history were the Asian Test Championships played in 1998–99 and 2001–02, which were also not great successes, until the ICC World Test Championship began in 2019.

== Teams ==
England

- C. B. Fry (captain)
- Jack Hobbs
- Wilfred Rhodes
- Reginald Spooner
- Frank Woolley
- Johnny Douglas
- Jack Hearne
- Pelham Warner
- Frank Foster
- Schofield Haigh
- Tiger Smith
- Sydney Barnes
- Gilbert Jessop
- Harry Dean
- Ernie Hayes
- Bill Hitch
- Walter Brearley

Australia

- Syd Gregory (captain)
- Warren Bardsley
- Barlow Carkeek
- Sid Emery
- Gerry Hazlitt
- Claude Jennings
- Charles Kelleway
- John McLaren
- Charlie Macartney
- Jimmy Matthews
- Edgar Mayne
- Roy Minnett
- David Smith
- Harold Webster
- Bill Whitty

South Africa

- Frank Mitchell (captain)
- Louis Tancred (captain)
- Rolland Beaumont
- Tom Campbell
- Claude Carter
- Joe Cox
- Aubrey Faulkner
- Gerald Hartigan
- Charles Llewellyn
- Dave Nourse
- Sid Pegler
- Reggie Schwarz
- Sibley Snooke
- Louis Stricker
- Herbie Taylor
- Tommy Ward
- Gordon White

== Notable incidents ==
Perhaps the most notable incident of the series was Australian bowler Jimmy Matthews taking two hat-tricks in the same Test match, one in each innings of the opening match against South Africa, the only time a bowler has taken two hat-tricks in the same Test.

== Tests ==
=== First match: Australia v South Africa at Old Trafford, 27–28 May 1912 ===
27–28 May 1912
(3-day match)
Scorecard

Australia	v	South Africa
448 (122.3 overs); W Bardsley 121; SJ Pegler 6/105 (45.3 overs)		265 (116 overs); GA Faulkner 122; WJ Whitty 5/55 (34 overs)
		95 (f/o) (28.2 overs); HW Taylor 21; C Kelleway 5/33 (14.2 overs)

Australia won by an innings and 88 runs
Old Trafford, Manchester
Umpires: GW Webb and A White

- Australia won the toss and elected to bat.
- CB Jennings, SH Emery and W Carkeek (all AUS), and GPD Hartigan, HW Taylor, R Beaumont, TA Ward (all SA) made their Test debuts.
- Report
- Australia batted first, completing their first innings score of 448 on the first day, with centuries for Charles Kelleway and Warren Bardsley. Sid Pegler took 6 wickets for 105 runs. South Africa were 16 for 1 at the close.
- South Africa were bowled out for 265 on the second day (with a century for Aubrey Faulkner, and Bill Whitty taking 5 wickets for 55 runs). They were within 30 runs of saving the follow on when Jimmy Matthews took a hat-trick to dismiss the last three batsmen. 183 runs behind, the South Africans were asked to bat again, and were bowled out again on the same day for 95 (Kelleway taking 5 for 33). Matthews took a second hat-trick in the second innings.
- Australian bowler Jimmy Matthews took a double hat-trick, one in each of South Africa's innings, both hat-tricks being taken on the same day, 28 May 1912. Matthews took no other wickets in the match.
- South Africa's debutant wicket-keeper Tommy Ward was Matthews' 3rd victim in both innings. Ward's is the only known instance of a king pair on debut in Test cricket.

=== Second match: England v South Africa at Lord's, 10–12 Jun 1912 ===
10–12 June 1912
(3-day match)
Scorecard

South Africa	v	England
58 (26.1 overs); AW Nourse 13; FR Foster 5/16 (13.1 overs)		337 (119 overs); RH Spooner 119; SJ Pegler 7/65 (31 overs)
217 (82 overs); CB Llewellyn 75; SF Barnes 6/85 (34 overs)

England won by an innings and 62 runs
Lord's, London
Umpires: W Richards and WAJ West

- South Africa won the toss and elected to bat.
- CP Carter (SA) made his Test debut.
- Report
- For the first time in a Test match, extras top scored in an innings.
- Heavy rain in the week before the match delayed the start on the first day until after 3pm, and then batting conditions were treacherous. South Africa were all out for 58 in their first innings within 90 minutes. Frank Foster and Sydney Barnes bowled 26.1 overs unchanged, taking 5 wickets each. England's opening batsmen Jack Hobbs and Wilfred Rhodes found the conditions much easier to cope with, and England were 122 for 1 at the close.
- On a sunny second day, Reggie Spooner scored 119, and Frank Woolley 73, with Pegler taking 7 for 65. England were all out for 337, with a first innings lead of 279 runs. South Africa were 114 for 4 at the close.
- South Africa were bowled out for 217 on the third day, with Charlie Llewellyn scoring 75 and Barnes taking another 6 wickets.

=== Third match: England v Australia at Lord's, 24–26 Jun 1912 ===
24–26 June 1912
(3-day match)
Scorecard

England	v	Australia
310/7d (90 overs); JB Hobbs 107; SH Emery 2/46 (12 overs)		282/7 (127.2 overs); CG Macartney 99; W Rhodes 3/59 (19.2 overs)

Match drawn
Lord's, London
Umpires: J Moss and AE Street

- England won the toss and elected to bat.
- H Dean (ENG) and DBM Smith (AUS) made their Test debuts.
- Report
- The match was ruined by the weather. Only about 3 hours were played on the first day due to two interruptions for rain. Play was not too difficult on the wet pitch to begin with, but became treacherous as the pitch dried. At the close, England were on 211/4. England added 30 runs in 20 minutes on the second day.
- The third day was sunny, and England declared at 310 for 7 (Hobbs 107).
- In reply, Australia made 282 for 7 before rain ended play, playing defensively to avoid defeat. Charlie Macartney scored 99 runs before being caught out, becoming only the third player in Test cricket to be dismissed one run short of a century.

=== Fourth match: England v South Africa at Headingley, 8–10 Jul 1912 ===
8–10 July 1912
(3-day match)
Scorecard

England	v	South Africa
242 (78.1 overs); FE Woolley 57; AW Nourse 4/52 (26.1 overs)		147 (56.3 overs); SJ Pegler 35*; SF Barnes 6/52 (22 overs)
238 (90.2 overs); RH Spooner 82; GA Faulkner 4/50 (24.2 overs)		159 (58.2 overs); LJ Tancred 39; SF Barnes 4/63 (21.2 overs)

England won by 174 runs
Headingley, Leeds
Umpires: W Richards and A White

- England won the toss and elected to bat.
- Report
- England were bowled out for 242 in their first innings (Woolley 57; Dave Nourse 4/52) before the end of the first day's play, and South Africa were 141/8 at the close.
- South Africa were all out for 147 on the second day (Pegler 35; Barnes 6/52), and England added 238 in their second innings (Spooner 82; Aubrey Faulkner 4/50).
- Having set South Africa a target of 334 to win, they reached 105/7 at the close of the second day's play, and were bowled out again for 159 on the third day (Louis Tancred 39, Barnes 4/63).

=== Fifth match: Australia v South Africa at Lord's, 15–17 Jul 1912 ===
15–17 July 1912
(3-day match)
Scorecard

South Africa	v	Australia
263 (89 overs); HW Taylor 93; WJ Whitty 4/68 (31 overs)		390 (128.5 overs); W Bardsley 164; SJ Pegler 4/79 (29.5 overs)
173 (57.1 overs); CB Llewellyn 59; TJ Matthews 4/29 (13 overs)		48/0 (12.1 overs); ER Mayne 25*

Australia won by 10 wickets
Lord's, London
Umpires: J Moss and AE Street

- South Africa won the toss and elected to bat.
- ER Mayne (AUS) made their Test debuts.
- Report
- South Africa were bowled out for 263 on the first day (Herbie Taylor 93; Bill Whitty 4/68), and Australia were 88/2 at the close.
- Australia reached 390 all out on the second day, 127 runs ahead, with centuries for Kelleway and Warren Bardsley (his 164 being the highest score in the tournament) and four wickets for Pegler. South Africa were 146/8 at the close.
- After bowling South Africa out for 173 on the third day (Llewellyn 59; Matthews 4/29), setting a target of 47 to win. Claude Jennings and debutant Ernie Mayne reached 48 runs for no loss within half an hour, to win the match.

=== Sixth match: England v Australia at Old Trafford, 29–31 Jul 1912 ===
29–31 July 1912
(3-day match)
Scorecard

England	v	Australia
203 (92.5 overs); W Rhodes 92; WJ Whitty 4/43 (27 overs)		14/0 (13 overs); CB Jennings 9*

Match drawn
Old Trafford, Manchester
Umpires: GW Webb and WAJ West

- England won the toss and elected to bat.
- Report
- In a rain-affected match, play started at nearly 3pm on the first day and around 5pm on the second day. With fewer than 110 overs possible over three days, England reached 185/6 at the end of the first day, and were all out for 203 (Wilf Rhodes 92; Gerry Hazlitt 4/77 and Bill Whitty 4/43) on the second day.
- Australia reached 14 for no loss before no further play was possible on the remainder of the second day or on the third day, and the match was drawn.

=== Seventh match: Australia v South Africa at Trent Bridge, 5–7 Aug 1912 ===
5–7 August 1912
(3-day match)
Scorecard

South Africa	v	Australia
329 (128.5 overs); AW Nourse 64; TJ Matthews 2/27 (20.5 overs)		219 (94.1 overs); W Bardsley 56; SJ Pegler 4/80 (36 overs)

Match drawn
Trent Bridge, Nottingham
Umpires: GW Webb and WAJ West

- South Africa won the toss and elected to bat.
- Report
- Despite a sodden pitch, cloudy weather allowed South Africa to reach 266/8 at the end of the first day. They were dismissed for 329 (Nourse 64), and the second day closed with Australia all out for 219 (Bardsley 56, Pegler 4/80). No play was possible on the third day.

=== Eighth match: England v South Africa at The Oval, 12–13 Aug 1912 ===
12–13 August 1912
(3-day match)
Scorecard

South Africa	v	England
95 (42.3 overs); HW Taylor 23; SJ Snooke 23; SF Barnes 5/28 (21 overs)		176 (56.1 overs); JB Hobbs 68; GA Faulkner 7/84 (27.1 overs)
93 (32.4 overs); AW Nourse 42; SF Barnes 8/29 (16.4 overs)		14/0 (4.3 overs); JB Hobbs 9*

England won by 10 wickets
The Oval, London
Umpires: W Richards and A White

- South Africa won the toss and elected to bat.
- Report
- In a low-scoring match, South Africa were bowled out for 95, with five wickets each for Barnes and Woolley. England reached 176 and then bowled South Africa out again for 93 (Barnes bowling unchanged to take 8/29), setting England a target of 13 runs to win. Jack Hobbs and Young Jack Hearne took only 27 balls to score 14 for no loss before lunch on the second day, to win by 10 wickets.

=== Ninth match: England v Australia at The Oval, 19–22 Aug 1912 ===
19–22 August 1912
(Timeless Test)
Scorecard

England	v	Australia
245 (114.1 overs); JB Hobbs 66; RB Minnett 4/34 (10.1 overs)		111 (54.4 overs); C Kelleway 43; FE Woolley 5/29 (9.4 overs)
175 (86.4 overs); CB Fry 79; GR Hazlitt 7/25 (21.4 overs)		65 (22.4 overs); CG Macartney 30; FE Woolley 5/20 (7.4 overs)

England won by 244 runs
The Oval, London
Umpires: J Moss and AE Street

- England won the toss and elected to bat.
- Report
- The tournament rules did not anticipate that two teams could complete their matches with the same number of wins and therefore contained no tie-breaking conditions. Therefore, to ensure an overall winner, the match was played as a timeless Test, with the three-day time limit removed. Regardless, the match finished during the fourth day.
- Despite heavy rain the day before the match, England reached 223/8 on the first day. There was only 1 1/2 hours play on the second day due to rain, during which England were dismissed for 245, with half centuries for Jack Hobbs and Frank Woolley and four wickets each for Bill Whitty and Roy Minnett. Australia were 51/2 when play was abandoned for the day.
- Australia were dismissed for 111 on the third day, with five wickets each for Barnes and Woolley and only Kelleway and Bardsley reaching double figures. The last 7 wickets fell for 21 runs England lost two quick wickets after lunch but batting became easier after a further rain delay and England were 64/4 at the close, 198 runs ahead.
- England were dismissed on the fourth day for 175 in their second innings, with CB Fry scoring 79 and Gerry Hazlitt taking 7/25. Needing 310 to win the match and the tournament, Australia were dismissed for just 65, with again only two batsmen reaching double figures (opener Claude Jennings and number 3 Charles Macartney), Woolley taking 5/20 and Harry Dean 4/19.

== Results table ==
Team	Played	Won	Lost	Drawn
England	6	4	0	2
Australia	6	2	1	3
South Africa	6	0	5	1

== See also ==
- Big Six cricket dispute of 1912
