= Australian cricket team in England in 1909 =

International cricket tour

The Australian cricket team in England in 1909 played 42 first-class matches, including five Test matches to contest The Ashes. Australia was captained by Monty Noble, England by Archie MacLaren. The third Test of the series, at Headingley, was the 100th Test match to be played by England.

== Test series summary ==
Australia won the Test series 2–1, with two matches drawn.

=== First Test ===
27–29 May 1909
Scorecard

Australia	v	England
74 (46 overs); WW Armstrong 24; C Blythe 6/44 (23 overs)		121 (55.3 overs); AO Jones 28; WW Armstrong 5/27 (15.3 overs)
151 (52.5 overs); SE Gregory 43; VS Ransford 43; GH Hirst 5/58 (23.5 overs); C Blythe 5/58 (24 overs)		105/0 (32.2 overs); JB Hobbs 62*

England won by 10 wickets
Edgbaston, Birmingham
Umpires: J Carlin and F Parris

- Australia won the toss and elected to bat.
- W Bardsley and WJ Whitty (both AUS), and GJ Thompson (ENG) made their Test debuts.

=== Second Test ===
14–16 June 1909
Scorecard

England	v	Australia
269 (107.2 overs); JH King 60; A Cotter 4/80 (23 overs)		350 (119.5 overs); VS Ransford 143*; AE Relf 5/85 (45 overs)
121 (60.5 overs); AO Jones 26; WW Armstrong 6/35 (24.5 overs)		41/1 (15.4 overs); PA McAlister 19*; AE Relf 1/9 (7.4 overs)

Australia won by 9 wickets
Lord's, London
Umpires: CE Dench and J Moss

- Australia won the toss and elected to field.
- JH King (ENG) made his Test debut.

=== Third Test ===
1–3 July 1909
Scorecard

Australia	v	England
188 (73.1 overs); SE Gregory 46; W Rhodes 4/38 (8 overs)		182 (84.3 overs); J Sharp 61; CG Macartney 7/58 (25.3 overs)
207 (96.1 overs); WW Armstrong 45; SF Barnes 6/63 (35 overs)		87 (37.5 overs); JB Hobbs 30; A Cotter 5/38 (16 overs)

Australia won by 126 runs
Headingley, Leeds
Umpires: W Richards and WAJ West

- Australia won the toss and elected to bat.
- J Sharp (ENG) made his Test debut.

=== Fourth Test ===
26–28 July 1909
Scorecard

Australia	v	England
147 (54.3 overs); WW Armstrong 32*; SF Barnes 5/56 (27 overs)		119 (52.2 overs); AFA Lilley 26*; FJ Laver 8/31 (18.2 overs)
279/9d (84.3 overs); VS Ransford 54*; W Rhodes 5/83 (25 overs)		108/3 (55 overs); RH Spooner 58; AJY Hopkins 2/31 (12 overs)

Match drawn
Old Trafford, Manchester
Umpires: W Richards and WAJ West

- Australia won the toss and elected to bat.

=== Fifth Test ===
9–11 August 1909
Scorecard

Australia	v	England
325 (89.3 overs); W Bardsley 136; DW Carr 5/146 (34 overs)		352 (106.4 overs); J Sharp 105; A Cotter 6/95 (27.4 overs)
339/5d (100 overs); W Bardsley 130; SF Barnes 2/61 (27 overs)		104/3 (33 overs); W Rhodes 54; WW Armstrong 2/8 (7 overs)

Match drawn
The Oval, London
Umpires: J Moss and W Richards

- Australia won the toss and elected to bat.
- FE Woolley and DW Carr (both ENG) made their Test debuts.
