= Australian cricket team in England in 1899 =

International cricket tour

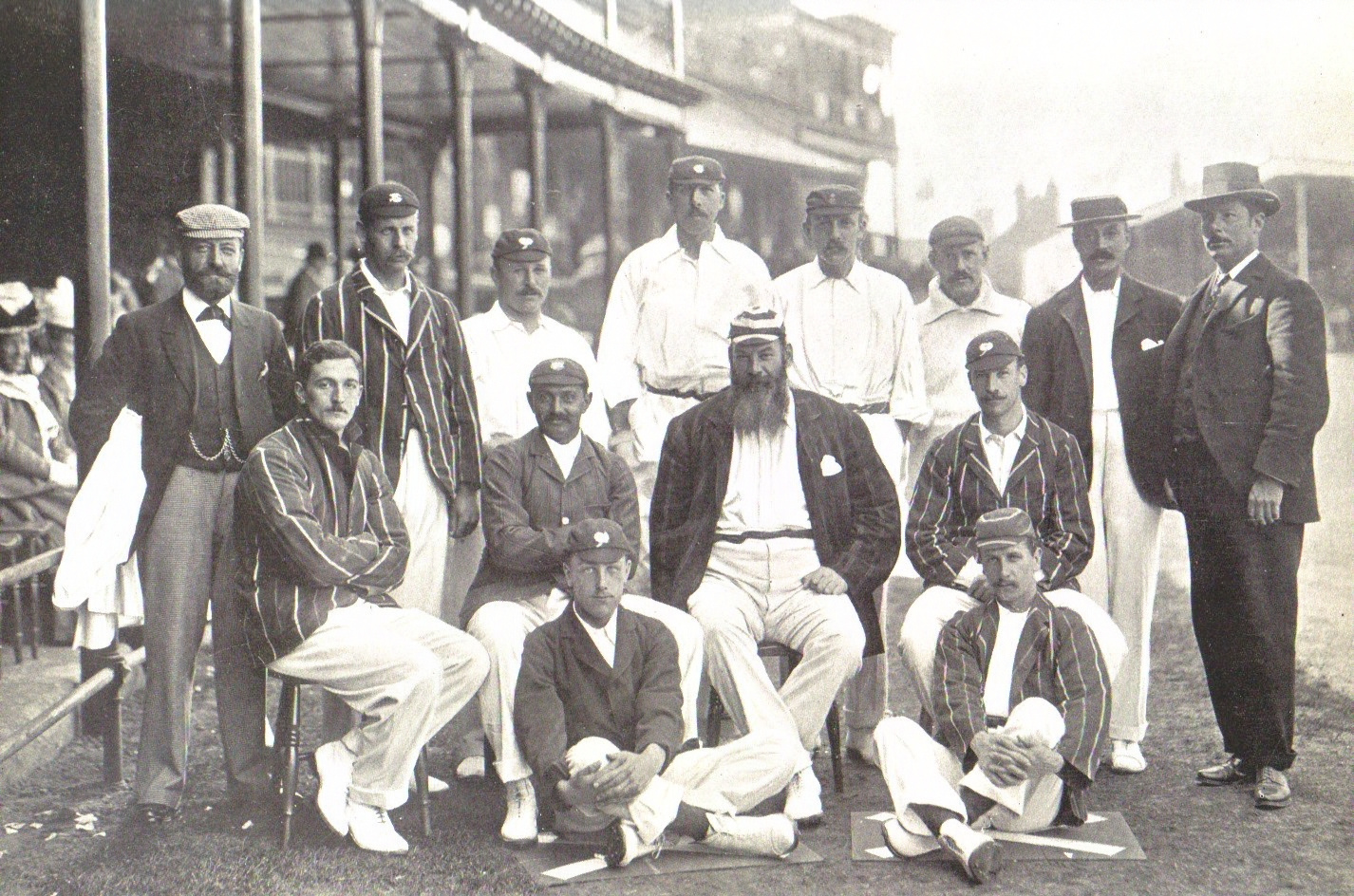
England team v. Australia, Trent Bridge 1899. Back row: Dick Barlow (umpire), Tom Hayward, George Hirst, Billy Gunn, J T Hearne (12th man), Bill Storer (wkt kpr), Bill Brockwell, V A Titchmarsh (umpire). Middle row: C B Fry, K S Ranjitsinhji, W G Grace (captain), Stanley Jackson. Front row: Wilfred Rhodes, Johnny Tyldesley.

The Australian cricket team in England in 1899 played 35 first-class matches including five Tests, the first time that a series in England had consisted of more than three matches. It was also the first time that a panel of selectors was appointed; previously the authority for the ground where the match was to be played was responsible for selecting the side.

The First Test at Trent Bridge saw W G Grace make his final appearance for England, while Wilfred Rhodes made his Test debut in the same match.

== Test series summary ==
Australia won the Test series 1–0, with four matches drawn.

=== First Test ===
1–3 June 1899
Scorecard

Australia	v	England
252 (152.2 overs); C Hill 52; W Rhodes 4/58 (35.2 overs)		193 (90.4 overs); CB Fry 50; E Jones 5/88 (33 overs)
230/8d (94 overs); C Hill 80; FS Jackson 3/57 (26 overs)		155/7 (99 overs); KS Ranjitsinhji 93*; H Trumble 3/39 (29 overs)

Match drawn
Trent Bridge, Nottingham
Umpires: RG Barlow and VA Titchmarsh

- Australia won the toss and elected to bat.
- VT Trumper and FJ Laver (both AUS), and W Rhodes (ENG) made their Test debuts.

=== Second Test ===
15–17 June 1899
Scorecard

England	v	Australia
206 (80.1 overs); FS Jackson 73; E Jones 7/88 (36.1 overs)		421 (170.1 overs); VT Trumper 135*; C Hill 135; CL Townsend 3/50 (15 overs)
240 (117.4 overs); AC MacLaren 88*; FJ Laver 3/36 (16 overs)		28/0 (11 overs); J Darling 17*

Australia won by 10 wickets
Lord's, London
Umpires: T Mycroft and WAJ West

- England won the toss and elected to bat.
- CL Townsend, GL Jessop and W Mead (all ENG) made their Test debuts.

=== Third Test ===
29 June–1 July 1899
Scorecard

Australia	v	England
172 (77.1 overs); J Worrall 76; HI Young 4/30 (19.1 overs)		220 (118.3 overs); AFA Lilley 55; H Trumble 5/60 (39.3 overs)
224 (85.3 overs); H Trumble 56; JT Hearne 4/50 (31.3 overs)		19/0 (7 overs); JT Brown 14*

Match drawn
Headingley, Leeds
Umpires: W Hearn and M Sherwin

- Australia won the toss and elected to bat.
- WG Quaife and HI Young (both ENG) made their Test debuts.

=== Fourth Test ===
17–19 July 1899
Scorecard

England	v	Australia
372 (141.1 overs); TW Hayward 130; MA Noble 3/85 (38 overs)		196 (82.3 overs); MA Noble 60*; WM Bradley 5/67 (33 overs)
94/3 (27 overs); KS Ranjitsinhji 49*; H Trumble 2/33 (13 overs)		346/7d (f/o) (181 overs); MA Noble 89; JT Hearne 3/54 (47 overs)

Match drawn
Old Trafford, Manchester
Umpires: AB Hide and J Lillywhite

- England won the toss and elected to bat.
- WM Bradley (ENG) made his Test debut.

=== Fifth Test ===
14–16 August 1899
Scorecard

England	v	Australia
576 (193.4 overs); TW Hayward 137; E Jones 4/164 (53 overs)		352 (143.3 overs); SE Gregory 117; WH Lockwood 7/71 (40.3 overs)
		254/5 (f/o) (100 overs); CE McLeod 77; W Rhodes 3/27 (22 overs)

Match drawn
The Oval, London
Umpires: W Richards and A White

- England won the toss and elected to bat.
- AO Jones (ENG) made his Test debut.

== External sources ==
- CricketArchive – tour summaries

== Annual reviews ==
- James Lillywhite's Cricketers' Annual (Red Lilly) 1900
- Wisden Cricketers' Almanack 1900
