= Big Six cricket dispute of 1912 =

Australian sporting disagreement

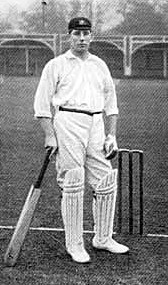
Clem Hill was a key member of the boycott.

The Big Six cricket dispute of 1912 was a confrontation between the administrators and players of the sport of cricket in Australia. Six of Australia's leading cricketers refused an invitation to tour England for the 1912 Triangular Tournament. The six players were Warwick Armstrong, Vernon Ransford, Victor Trumper, Tibby Cotter, Hanson Carter, and Clem Hill. The dispute was the culmination of a series of arguments that followed the establishment of the Australian Board of Control for International Cricket in 1905. The ramifications of the dispute were far-reaching and affected the destiny of Australian cricket over the ensuing decades.

== Causes ==
The immediate cause of the dispute was the insistence by the players that they had a right to select the managers of Australian cricket teams touring overseas. However the dispute was a wider one; a power struggle over who would have access to the revenue these tours raised. The players had the support of the South Australian Cricket Association and several unhappy members of Melbourne Cricket Club. The Board was dubbed tyrannical at rowdy public meetings, pamphleteers abounded, and funds were raised to send an independent team, inclusive of the Big Six, to England.

The boycott was initially successful in securing the support of public opinion and the performance and antics of the replacement team caused some embarrassment for the Board. Despite this, in the end the Board, supported by Queensland, was able to gain complete control of revenues and appointments for future tours, and the 1912 team went to England without the dissenters. The players were relegated to a subservient role that would not change until the next player rebellion in the 1970s that saw the establishment of World Series Cricket.

The 1911–12 Ashes tour against England took place in an environment of hostility between the players and the new Board. Contrary to previous arrangements when the Board was established in 1905, the Board of Control made plans to usurp the commonly accepted rights of the players to appoint the team manager when touring England. In response, the group of senior players, "the Big Six" threatened to withdraw from the next tour, to take place in 1912, unless their choice, Frank Laver was appointed.

== Effects ==
Matters came to a head when Clem Hill, the Australian captain and member of the Big Six sent a telegram to fellow selector, Peter McAlister, urging the inclusion of the New South Wales all-rounder Charlie Macartney in the team for the Fourth Test in Melbourne. The reply from McAlister – a member of the Board of Control to Hill's request was "...Still opposed to Macartney's inclusion. If Iredale (another selector) agrees with you as to Macartney's inclusion, I favour yourself standing down not Minnett." At a meeting held after the Test, the Board of Control rejected the players' petition and declared that the manager would be appointed by the Board alone. At a "special meeting" two weeks later, the Board appointed George Crouch from Queensland to the position.

The following day, 3 February 1912, the selection committee met in Sydney to decide the team for the Fourth Test. It was the first time Hill and McAlister had met since the exchange of telegrams. The pair exchanged insults with McAlister sharply criticising Hill's captaincy. Hill retorted, "In England, Armstrong wouldn't play under you. Did you ever win any except second rate games?"

McAlister replied, "I am a better captain than Trumper, Armstrong and yourself put together. You are the worst captain I have ever seen," Hill then warned McAlister to stop insulting him, McAlister repeated the remark. Losing control, Hill struck McAlister a blow across the face. The two then grappled for around ten minutes. Blood was drawn, staining their clothes and splashing on the other men present, Iredale and secretary Sydney Smith. At one stage, fearing that one or both combatants would fall through the window and onto the street, Smith grabbed hold of Hill's coat-tails. The fight ended with a bloody McAlister lying on the floor and Hill, unmarked standing over him. Hill told Smith he could no longer work with McAlister and was asked to put his resignation in writing; the Board accepted it that evening.

When the Board announced that George Crouch would be manager of the Australian team for 1912 Triangular Tournament in England, rather than Frank Laver, outright rebellion ensued. Armstrong, Hill, Trumper, Carter, Cotter and Ransford announced that they would be unavailable to join the touring party. The team, under the captaincy of Syd Gregory, left without these players, and also without their best bowler “Ranji” Hordern who could not leave Australia due to his medical duties. The tour was not a success on any front: the Australians winning only nine games and losing eight in a wet season and Crouch on return to Australia reported to the Board that "some of the players had conducted themselves so badly in England as to lead to the team being socially ostracised." Nevertheless, as Gideon Haigh has written, "the deed was done: a national governing body and a species of democracy had been imposed on Australian cricket, although at the cost of reducing its players to serfdom."

== Bibliography ==
- Haigh, Gideon (2001). The Big Ship: Warwick Armstrong and the making of modern cricket. Melbourne: Text. ISBN 1-877008-84-2.
- —. "The board takes control, 1906." The Sydney Morning Herald, 6 February 2004.
- Pollard, Jack (1986). The pictorial history of Australian cricket (revised ed.). Melbourne: JM Dent. ISBN 0-86770-043-2.
- Robinson, Ray; Haigh, Gideon (1996). On top down under: Australia's cricket captains (revised ed.). Adelaide: Wakefield. ISBN 1-86254-387-9.
