= Peter McAlister =

Australian cricketer

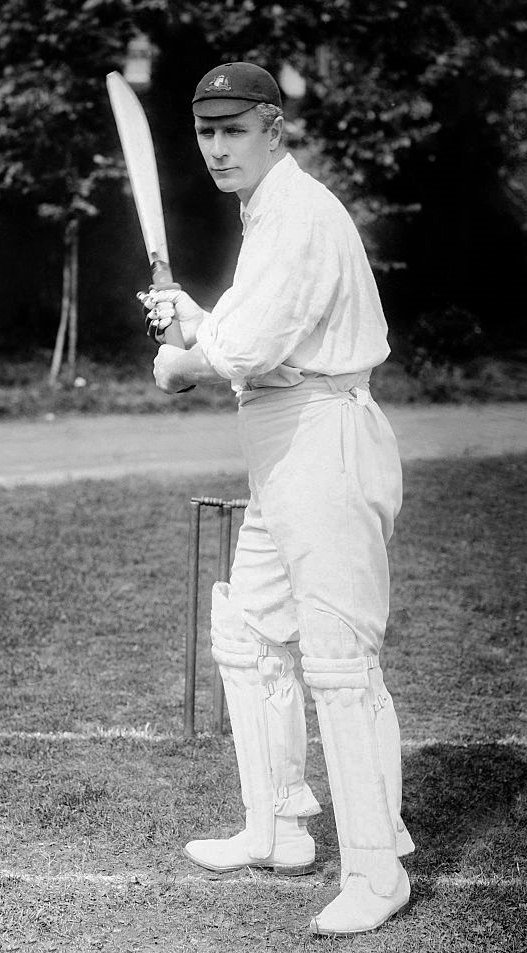
- McAlister during the Ashes tour to England in 1909

Personal information
- Full name: Peter Alexander McAlister
- Born: 11 July 1869; Williamstown, Victoria
- Died: 10 May 1938 (aged 68); Richmond, Victoria
- Batting: Right-handed

International information
- National side: Australia
- Test debut (cap 86): 26 February 1904 v England
- Last Test: 1 July 1909 v England

Career statistics
Competition	Test	First-class
Matches	8	85
Runs scored	252	4,552
Batting average	16.80	32.74
100s/50s	0/0	9/22
Top score	41	224
Balls bowled	0	128
Wickets	–	3
Bowling average	–	18.66
5 wickets in innings	–	0
10 wickets in match	–	0
Best bowling	–	1/0
Catches/stumpings	10/–	91/–
- Source: Cricinfo, 13 October 2022

Peter Alexander McAlister (11 July 1869 – 10 May 1938) was an Australian cricketer who played in eight Test matches from 1904 to 1909.

His undemocratic appointment as vice-captain-cum-treasurer of the Australian cricket team in England in 1909 irrupted latent animus between the Australian Board of Control for International Cricket and its players. An unpopular choice, McAlister was forced to brood his way through the tour after player-appointed manager Frank Laver declined to assist him. Two years later, accordingly, the Board unilaterally repealed the players' informal right to choose their own manager. It was this which motivated the Big Six, supported by the South Australian Cricket Association and some disgruntled members of the Melbourne Cricket Club, to pull out of the 1912 Triangular Tournament, and McAlister then had a brawl with Australian Captain Clem Hill (one of the 6), which resulted in Hill's resignation.

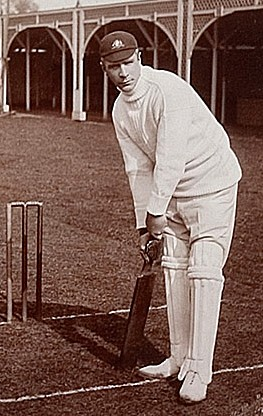
Peter McAlister
