= Harold Webster =

Harold Webster may refer to:

- H. T. Webster (1885–1952), American cartoonist
- Harold Webster (runner) (1895–1958), Canadian athlete
- Harold Webster (cricketer) (1889–1949), cricketer for South Australia

== See also ==
- Harry Webster (1917–2007), British engineer
