= Stanley Clutterbuck =

Australian cricketer

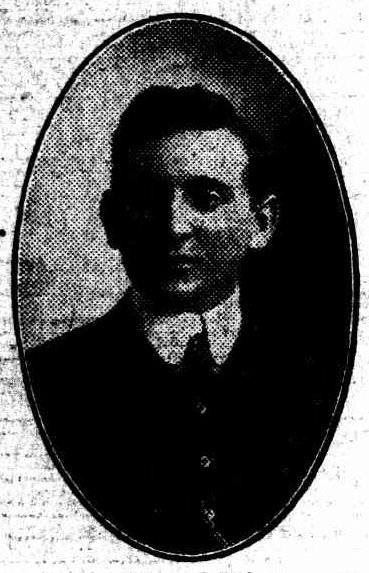

Personal information
- Born: 27 May 1888; Kapunda, South Australia
- Died: 24 January 1972 (aged 83); Adelaide, South Australia
- Source: Cricinfo, 4 June 2018

Stanley Clutterbuck (27 May 1888 – 24 January 1972) was an Australian cricketer. He played one first-class match for South Australia in 1914. In grade cricket he played for North Adelaide.

== Cricket career ==
Clutterbuck debuted in South Australian district cricket for North Adelaide in January 1914 against West Torrhens. He performed well on debut and in his second match against Adelaide University and was selected for South Australia in the place of Bill Whitty who was unavailable. His inexperience was noted, but his control was cited as a strength. He played his only First-Class game on February 13 against Victoria at the Adelaide Oval and went wicketless.

He took 28 wickets overall in the 1913-14 district season, only playing in the latter part of the season. In the 1914-15 district season he scored 191 runs at 21.2 with a high score of 32, and took 26 wickets at 23 for North Adelaide, and his batting was noted as having improved. Following the end of WWI Clutterbuck played a game for North Adelaide against University in 1919 taking 1 for 82, but does not appear to have played regularly.

== See also ==
- List of South Australian representative cricketers
