= Billy Zulch =

South African cricketer (1886–1924)

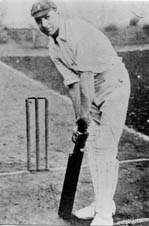

Personal information
- Full name: Johan Wilhelm Zulch
- Born: 2 January 1886; Lydenburg, Transvaal
- Died: May 19, 1924 (aged 38); Umkomaas, Natal, South Africa
- Batting: Right-handed
- Bowling: Right-arm medium

International information
- National side: South Africa
- Test debut: 1 January 1910 v England
- Last Test: 26 November 1921 v Australia

Domestic team information
- Years: Team
- 1908/09–1923/24: Transvaal

Career statistics
Competition	Test	First-class
Matches	16	53
Runs scored	985	3,556
Batting average	32.83	41.83
100s/50s	2/4	9/17
Top score	150	185
Balls bowled	24	210
Wickets	0	5
Bowling average	–	24.40
5 wickets in innings	–	0
10 wickets in match	–	0
Best bowling	–	3/28
Catches/stumpings	4/–	19/–
- Source: CricketArchive, 13 November 2022

Johan Wilhelm Zulch (2 January 1886 – 19 May 1924) was a South African cricketer who played 16 Test matches for South Africa between 1910 and 1921. His cricket career was interrupted by World War I, but he still managed 985 Test runs at an average of 32.83, with two Test centuries — both against Australia on his first overseas tour in 1910–11. He was a heavy scorer for Transvaal in domestic cricket.

== Career ==
Zulch was born in Lydenburg, Transvaal, and attended Sea Point High School in Cape Town. An right-handed opening batsman with a wide range of strokes, a strong defence, and unlimited patience, he made his first-class debut for Transvaal in the 1908–09 season. He scored his first century in his third match, when he and Archibald Difford set a new South African first-wicket record with a partnership of 190, Zulch scoring 112 retired hurt.

The next season Zulch again set a new South African first-wicket record, when he and Louis Stricker put on 215 for Transvaal against the touring MCC team, Zulch making 176 not out. He was included in South Africa's Test team during the series against England, and in the final Test he carried his bat through the first innings, making 43 not out in South Africa's total of 103.

Zulch was one of South Africa's leading batsmen on the tour of Australia in 1910–11, scoring 354 runs in the five Tests, with two centuries. He scored 105 in the Third Test, the only Test South Africa won. Zulch batted for three hours, after which a hundred from Tip Snooke then boosted South Africa to 482; and, despite 214 from Australian batsman Victor Trumper, and a relative failure from Zulch with 14 in the second innings, South Africa went on to win by 38 runs. He scored 150 in the second innings of the Fifth Test after South Africa had followed on 204 runs behind, but it was not enough to save the match.

In the series against England in 1913–14, Zulch played only three of the five Tests, but still finished second in the South African aggregates, with 239 runs at an average of 39.83. In the Third and Fifth Tests he and Herbie Taylor made century stands for the first wicket, Zulch scoring 82 and 60 respectively.

Zulch captained South Africa in their two matches against the Australian Imperial Forces XI in 1919–20, scoring 135 in the match in Johannesburg. During the 1920–21 season, at one stage he scored four centuries in five innings, including 185 and 125 in the match against Orange Free State – the first time anyone had scored two centuries in a match in South African domestic cricket.

In the Second Test against Australia at the Old Wanderers in Johannesburg in 1921, the Australian fast bowler Ted McDonald dismissed Zulch with a fast delivery that broke his bat and sent fragments back onto the stumps, dislodging a bail, and the Zulch was given out, "hit wicket".

== Personal life ==
Zulch married Lesbia van der Linde in Johannesburg in June 1911. They lived in Johannesburg, where he worked as a motor auctioneer. They had two sons and two daughters.

After six years of illness, resulting in a nervous breakdown, Zulch took his own life in May 1924, in the coastal town of Umkomaas, Natal, where he had gone in the hope of recovering his health. The inquest into his death determined the cause as "suicide while suffering from nervous breakdown".
