= John Butler (cricketer) =

English cricketer

Personal information
- Full name: John Butler
- Born: 29 August 1863; Clifton, Nottinghamshire, England
- Died: 21 May 1945 (aged 81); Belper, Derbyshire, England
- Batting: Right-handed
- Relatives: John Moss (brother-in-law); George Wootton (uncle)

Domestic team information
- Years: Team
- 1889: Nottinghamshire

Career statistics
Competition	First-class
Matches	6
Runs scored	111
Batting average	15.85
100s/50s	–/1
Top score	56
Balls bowled	–
Wickets	–
Bowling average	–
5 wickets in innings	–
10 wickets in match	–
Best bowling	–
Catches/stumpings	1/–
- Source: Cricinfo, 22 November 2015

John Butler (29 August 1863 – 21 May 1945) was an English cricketer active in first-class cricket in 1889, playing as a right-handed batsman for Nottinghamshire.

Butler made his debut in first-class cricket when he was selected to play for Nottinghamshire against Kent at Trent Bridge. Five further appearances came for Nottinghamshire in 1891, with his final appearance coming against Yorkshire at Trent Bridge. During the course of his only season in first-class cricket, Butler scored 111 runs at an average of 15.85. He made one half century score, 56 against Gloucestershire.

He died at Belper, Derbyshire on 21 May 1945. His uncle, George Wootton, was a first-class cricketer, while his brother-in-law, John Moss, was a Test cricket umpire.
