= Valentine Titchmarsh =

English cricketer and Test match umpire

Valentine Adolphus Titchmarsh (14 February 1853 – 11 October 1907) was a first-class cricketer and Test match umpire. Born in 1853 in Hertfordshire, he played eight matches for Marylebone Cricket Club and others between 1885 and 1891 as a right-arm quick bowler and left-handed batsman. His best haul, 5 for 69, came against Cambridge University. He played for his native minor county Hertfordshire County Cricket Club from 1876 to 1897.

Titchmarsh stood in three Test matches, on the Australian tours of England in 1899, 1902 and 1905. He served as a first-class cricket umpire from 1882 to 1906 and died in 1907.

== References and external links ==
- Valentine Titchmarsh at CricketArchive (subscription required)
