= Harry Dean (cricketer) =

English cricketer

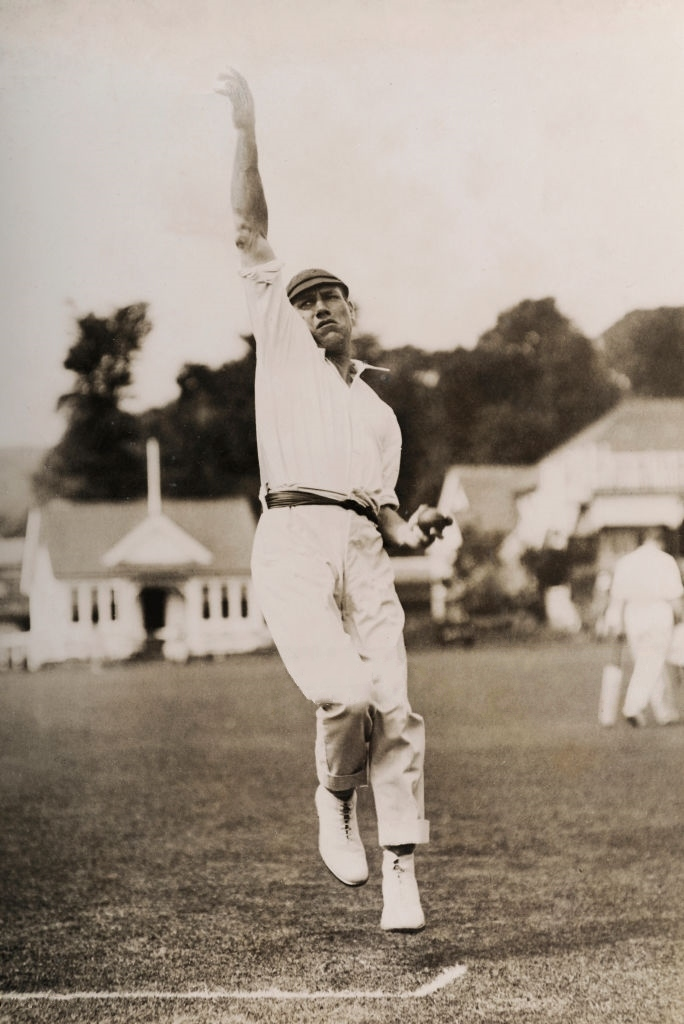
- Dean in 1920

Personal information
- Born: 13 August 1884; Burnley, Lancashire, England
- Died: 12 March 1957 (aged 72); Garstang, Lancashire, England
- Batting: Left-handed
- Bowling: Left-arm fast-medium

International information
- National side: England
- Test debut: 24 June 1912 v Australia
- Last Test: 22 August 1912 v Australia

Career statistics
Competition	Test	First-class
Matches	3	267
Runs scored	10	2,559
Batting average	5.00	10.31
100s/50s	0/0	0/0
Top score	8	49*
Balls bowled	447	59,289
Wickets	11	1,301
Bowling average	13.90	18.14
5 wickets in innings	0	97
10 wickets in match	0	24
Best bowling	4/19	9/31
Catches/stumpings	2/–	121/–
- Source: CricInfo, 30 December 2021

Harry Dean (13 August 1884 – 12 March 1957) was an English cricketer who played for Lancashire and England.

Dean was a left-arm bowler who could bowl fast-medium swing or slower spinners to suit the conditions. Joining Lancashire in 1906, he made an immediate impact with 60 wickets in his first season. He took 100 wickets in 1907 but was expensive given that virtually all pitches suited spin bowling. However, by developing fast-medium swingers of a similar style to George Hirst as a dry-weather alternative to his slow-medium spinners, Dean improved steadily to be by 1910 clearly the best bowler in the Lancashire eleven with 137 wickets. In 1911, although he was overworked when Walter Brearley was away on business, Dean went from strength to strength, taking 175 wickets in the County Championship and being by 23 wickets the leading bowler in first-class cricket (and this in spite of often resting when the fast bowler was away from business). In the six games he did partner Brearley, the two gave enough evidence that they could be formidable indeed: against Kent on a perfect wicket at Canterbury they got down eight wickets for 58 at the start and went on to take all twenty wickets in the match – Brearley twelve for 218, Dean eight for 144 – depriving Kent of a hat-trick of titles in the process.

In 1912, now almost exclusively bowling spin, Dean was better than ever and in wet weather carried all before him, taking 13 for 49 against Worcestershire and fifteen wickets against Kent – both at Old Trafford. Dean played three times for England that summer in the 1912 Triangular Tournament – twice against South Africa and once against Australia. Though he bowled very well in these games, with four for nineteen on a sticky wicket in the decisive Test against Australia his high point, Dean was near retirement before the next home Tests were played and was never thought likely to do well abroad.

In 1913, Dean was steady but rather expensive on the hard wickets, but on a rain-affected pitch in a special “Roses match” against Yorkshire arranged for the visit of King George V to the Aigburth ground at Liverpool, Dean accomplished one of the best performance in first-class cricket. He took nine wickets for 62 runs in the first innings, and eight for 29 in the second, and his match figures of 17 for 91 remain the best in a first-class match for Lancashire or against Yorkshire.

In 1914, Dean was absent for most of the first half of the season, and did only one notable performance on returning when he took 13 for 84 against a strong Hampshire side, whilst he was very disappointing in 1919. However, he surprised the critics in 1920 with a superb season, taking over 120 wickets and with Lawrence Cook helping Lancashire to second spot. He bowled very well in 1921 even if helped by some appalling batting sides, but then switched to Cheshire in the Minor Counties Championship for the 1922 & 1923 seasons. After his retirement from playing cricket, he coached at Rossall School.
