= Claude Jennings =

Australian cricketer (1884–1950)

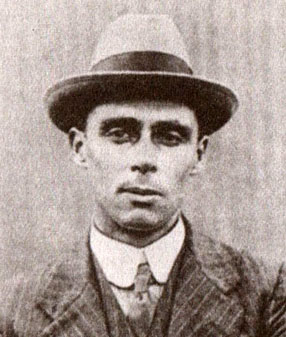

Personal information
- Full name: Claude Burrows Jennings
- Born: 5 June 1884; East St Kilda, Melbourne, Victoria
- Died: 20 June 1950 (aged 66); North Adelaide, South Australia, Australia
- Batting: Right-handed

International information
- National side: Australia
- Test debut (cap 103): 27 May 1912 v South Africa
- Last Test: 19 August 1912 v England

Domestic team information
- Years: Team
- 1902/03–1907/08: South Australia
- 1910/11–1911/12: Queensland

Career statistics
Competition	Tests	First-class
Matches	6	60
Runs scored	107	2,453
Batting average	17.83	25.55
100s/50s	0/0	1/16
Top score	32	123
Catches/stumpings	5/–	38/3
- Source: CricketArchive, 12 October 2022

Claude Burrows Jennings (5 June 1884 – 20 June 1950) was an Australian cricketer who played for South Australia, Queensland and Australia.

Jennings was a right-hand opening batsman and occasional wicket-keeper who had a fairly undistinguished domestic cricketing career in Australia in which he scored just one century and averaged, in first-class matches, little over 20 runs per innings. He owed his selection for the Australian team that contested the 1912 Triangular Tournament in England to the dispute between the Australian Cricket Board of Control and senior players, including Clem Hill and Victor Trumper, which led to six leading players being omitted from the touring party.

On the tour, Jennings played in all six Test matches, three each against England and South Africa. In eight innings, two of them not out, he scored 107 runs with a highest of 32 in his very first Test innings, against South Africa at Manchester. He did not keep wicket in the Tests. On the tour as a whole, he scored 1037 runs, with a highest score of 82.

Jennings retired from first-class cricket after the 1912 tour. He worked for Dalgety & Co until 1918, when he formed his own accountancy firm. He was a British trade representative in South Australia, and served as secretary of the Adelaide Chamber of Commerce from 1937 to 1949.
