= Harold Webster (cricketer) =

Australian cricketer

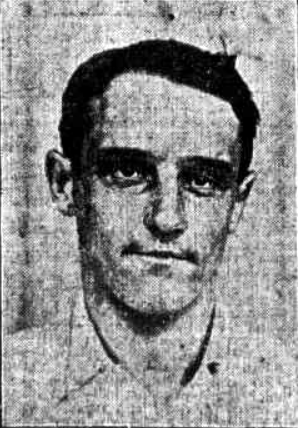

Personal information
- Full name: Harold Wynne Webster
- Born: 17 February 1887; Sydney, New South Wales, Australia
- Died: 7 October 1949 (aged 62); Randwick, Sydney, New South Wales, Australia
- Batting: Right-handed
- Role: Wicket-keeper

Domestic team information
- Years: Team
- 1910-11 to 1911-12: South Australia

Career statistics
Competition	FC
Matches	19
Runs scored	346
Batting average	14.41
100s/50s	0/1
Top score	54
Catches/stumpings	21/4
- Source: Cricinfo, 24 April 2018

Harold Wynne Webster (17 February 1887 – 7 October 1949) was an Australian cricketer for South Australia who played first-class cricket from March 1911 to October 1912 and toured England with the Australian team in 1912.

== Life and career ==
A wicket-keeper, Webster was playing in Sydney in 1910 when Victor Trumper advised him to try playing in Adelaide to see if he could further his chances of playing interstate cricket. He began playing for North Adelaide and was soon selected in the South Australian team.

After several of Australia's leading players refused to tour, Webster was one of the first players chosen to tour England with Australia for the 1912 Triangular Tournament, but he did not play Test cricket. He played the last 13 of his 19 first-class matches on the tour.

Webster returned to Sydney and was twice chosen to play for New South Wales in the 1913–14 season, but was unavailable to play. He played for Randwick in their initial seasons in first-grade cricket in the early 1920s.

Webster worked as a real estate agent in Sydney. He died at his home in the Sydney suburb of Randwick in October 1949, aged 62. He was survived by his wife Dora and their two sons.
