= Barlow Carkeek =

Australian sportsman

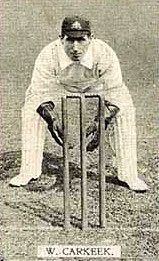

Personal information
- Full name: William Carkeek
- Born: 17 October 1878; Walhalla, Victoria
- Died: 20 February 1937 (aged 58); Prahran, Victoria
- Nickname: Barlow
- Batting: Left-handed
- Role: Wicket-keeper

International information
- National side: Australia
- Test debut (cap 101): 27 May 1912 v South Africa
- Last Test: 19 August 1912 v England

Domestic team information
- Years: Team
- 1903/04–1913/14: Victoria

Career statistics
| Competition | Test | First-class |
|---|---|---|
| Matches | 6 | 95 |
| Runs scored | 16 | 1388 |
| Batting average | 5.33 | 12.17 |
| 100s/50s | 0/0 | 0/2 |
| Top score | 6* | 68 |
| Catches/stumpings | 6/0 | 114/46 |
- Source: Cricinfo, 10 September 2022
Australian rules football career
Playing career^{1}
| Years | Club | Games (Goals) |
| 1899–1902;1905–1907 | Richmond (VFA) | 73 (48) |
| 1903–1905 | Essendon | 26 (8) |
- ^{1} Playing statistics correct to the end of 1907.

William "Barlow" Carkeek (17 October 1878 – 20 February 1937) was an Australian sportsman who played Test cricket for Australia and first-class cricket for Victoria, as well as playing Australian rules football in the Victorian Football League (VFL) for Essendon.

== "Barlow" ==
Carkeek, generally known otherwise as "Bill", earned the nickname "Barlow" among the Australian cricketing community, because his batting style was reminiscent of Dick Barlow, the notoriously defensive opening batsman for England and Lancashire.

== Cricket ==
Principally played as a wicketkeeper, "Barlow" Carkeek was also a stolid, defensive left-hand batsman. He played for Victoria for 10 years from 1903 to 1914, and was rated as steady rather than spectacular.

He toured England in 1909 as the second wicketkeeper to Sammy Carter and returned in 1912 as first choice on the tour that was blighted by the dispute between Australia's leading Test players and the Australian Board of Control and the consequent unavailability of many players. It was on this tour that he played his six Test matches, three each against England and South Africa in the Triangular Tournament. He scored only 16 runs and took just six catches.

== Australian rules football ==
A blacksmith by trade, Carkeek also played 26 top-class Australian rules football games, kicking 8 goals, for Essendon in the Victorian Football League (VFL) from 1903 to 1905.

He also played for Richmond in the Victorian Football Association (VFA) before and after his stint with Essendon. He left Essendon after the fourth home-and-away match of the 1905 VFL season; he returned to Richmond, and played in the 1905 Richmond winning VFA Grand Final Team.

== Death ==
Carkeek died as the result of the injuries he sustained when he was struck by a motorist when crossing Point Nepean Road, opposite Hurlingham Park in the Melbourne suburb of East Brighton, in heavy rain during a thunderstorm on 20 February 1937. Taken by ambulance to the Alfred Hospital, he died several hours later. He was buried on 22 February 1937 in the Cheltenham Memorial Park (Wangara Road).

== Sources ==
- W. Karkeek Killed: Noted 'Keeper, The Sporting Globe, (Wednesday, 24 February 1937), p. 8.
- Hogan, P., The Tigers of Old, Richmond FC, (Melbourne), 1996. ISBN 0-646-18748-1
- Maplestone, M., Flying Higher: History of the Essendon Football Club 1872–1996, Essendon Football Club, (Melbourne), 1996. ISBN 0-9591740-2-8
