= Sid Pegler =

South African cricketer (1888–1972)

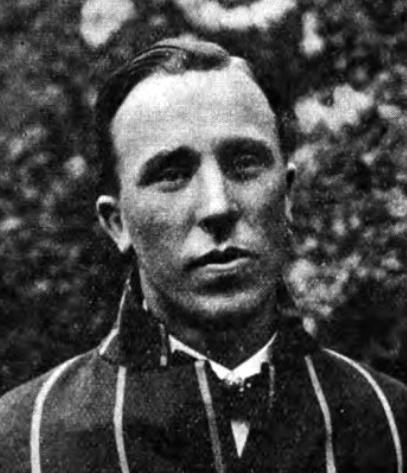
- Sid Pegler in 1912

Personal information
- Full name: Sidney James Pegler
- Batting: Right-handed
- Bowling: Right-arm medium

International information
- National side: South Africa
- Test debut: 26 February 1910 v England
- Last Test: 16 August 1924 v England

Career statistics
Competition	Test	First-class
Matches	16	103
Runs scored	356	1,677
Batting average	15.47	12.70
100s/50s	0/0	0/5
Top score	35*	79
Balls bowled	2,989	19,663
Wickets	47	425
Bowling average	33.44	19.58
5 wickets in innings	2	32
10 wickets in match	0	5
Best bowling	7/65	8/54
Catches/stumpings	5/–	56/–
- Source: Cricinfo, 1 February 2020

Sidney James Pegler (28 July 1888 – 10 September 1972) was a South African cricketer. He emerged following the decline of their googly bowlers Vogler and Schwarz in the early 1910s.

Although Pegler only played a few first-class matches in South Africa between 1908 and 1910, he was chosen for South Africa's first Test tour of 1910/1911 and immediately established himself as a Test regular, although the extremely hard Australian wickets were as difficult for him as they were for the much-acclaimed "googly" trio of Vogler, Schwarz and Aubrey Faulkner. Despite taking only seven wickets in the Test series, it was no surprise when Pegler was chosen for the 1912 "Triangular Tournament" tour. On this tour, Pegler was a resounding success, playing in all but three of the South Africans' thirty-seven first-class matches and in an extremely wet summer being the leading first-class wicket-taker with 189 (eleven more than leading English bowler Colin Blythe). He took twenty-nine wickets in the six Tests despite the fact that South Africa only once bowled through two full innings owing to their being outclassed against both England and Australia. Pegler also did fairly well as a slogging tail-end batsman, scoring for the whole tour 643 runs at an average of over fifteen with his best scores being 79 against South Wales at Swansea and 52 against Northamptonshire's strong attack. Pegler also set a record for the fastest first-class fifty during the 1910/1911 tour when he hit 50 in fourteen minutes against Tasmania. Against genuine bowling this has been bettered only by Jim Smith in 1938 and Khalid Mahmood in 2000/2001.

Pegler's bowling was chiefly focused on a medium-paced leg-cutter which was not tossed high in the air but he had several variations including a break-back and a faster ball - both of which obtained many wickets during his successful 1912 campaign.

It might have been expected that Pegler would become the mainstay of the South African bowling attack for years to come, since he was only twenty-four and seemed to have great potential. However, his appointment as a colonial District Commissioner in Nyasaland around this time meant that Pegler was never able to return to South Africa after playing one match for Transvaal at the beginning of 1913. Consequently, his only Test cricket after 1912 was on the 1924 tour, for which he was not even an original selection but where he was nonetheless much more successful than such bowlers as Buster Nupen, who had acquired a remarkable reputation on matting pitches.

During World War I he was awarded the DSO and was wounded three times, once in his bowling arm.

After he retired from first-class cricket in 1930, Pegler continued working in the game's administration. He managed the 1951 touring team to England.
