= Bill Whitty =

Australian cricketer

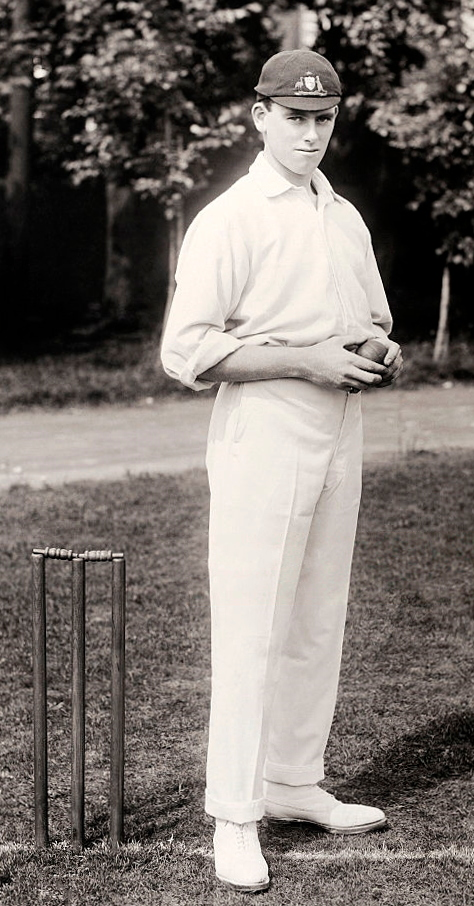
- Whitty during the Ashes tour to England in 1909

Personal information
- Full name: William James Whitty
- Born: 15 August 1886; Sydney, Australia
- Died: 30 January 1974 (aged 87); Tantanoola, South Australia
- Batting: Right-handed
- Bowling: Left-arm fast-medium
- Role: Bowler

International information
- National side: Australia
- Test debut (cap 95): 27 May 1909 v England
- Last Test: 19 August 1912 v England

Domestic team information
- Years: Team
- 1907–1908: New South Wales
- 1908–1926: South Australia

Career statistics
Competition	Test	First-class
Matches	14	119
Runs scored	161	1,465
Batting average	13.41	11.53
100s/50s	0/0	0/1
Top score	39*	81
Balls bowled	3,357	24,948
Wickets	65	491
Bowling average	21.12	23.40
5 wickets in innings	3	26
10 wickets in match	0	4
Best bowling	6/17	8/27
Catches/stumpings	4/–	35/–
- Source: CricketArchive, 15 April 2010

William James Whitty (15 August 1886 – 30 January 1974) was an Australian cricketer who played 14 Test matches between 1909 and 1912.

== Early career ==
Born in Sydney, Whitty had only played junior cricket before he was noticed by Test batsman Victor Trumper, who recommended him for coaching and gave him the opportunity to bowl to the New South Wales state team. In 1907, at the age of 21, Whitty made his first-class debut for New South Wales against Queensland at the Sydney Cricket Ground, taking 3 wickets. This was the only first-class match Whitty played for his home state, as he was recruited to Adelaide by Clem Hill to play for South Australia in 1908. Whitty played 5 first-class games in the 1908–09 Australian season, including one match for a "Rest of Australia" team against the Australian XI, where he took 3 wickets. Over the entire season, Whitty took 11 wickets with an average of 49.00, which was enough to earn him selection into the Australian team to tour England in 1909.

== Test career ==
Whitty played in the first Test of the series, recording figures of 0/43 and 0/18 as England posted a dominant 10 wicket victory. Whitty was replaced for the second Test, which Australia won, along with the third, in retaining the Ashes. Despite his struggle to hold on to his Test position, Whitty took 77 wickets on the tour, at the impressive average of 20.42. On his return home to Australia, he continued to play for South Australia in 1909–10, helping them to win the Sheffield Shield for the second time in their history. In the final match of the season against New South Wales, Whitty took 5/43 as his former team was dismissed for just 92 in their first innings.

Whitty's six-foot tall frame allowed him to swing the new ball considerably, and he also bowled reasonably quick left-arm orthodox deliveries with the older ball. He was seen as the ideal partner for fast bowler Tibby Cotter, and the pair opened the bowling at home against South Africa in 1910–11. This series has been described as Whitty's "greatest Test success", as he played all 5 Tests to take 37 wickets at the outstanding average of 17.08. Whitty took 8 wickets in the first Test, followed by 3 in the first innings of the second Test in Melbourne. In the second innings, with South Africa requiring 170 runs for victory, Whitty produced one of the "most sensational" bowling spells by an Australian in the period, taking 6/17 in 16 overs as South Africa were bowled out for 80. Whitty's good form continued throughout the series, including a further 8 wickets in the third Test, and 5/79 for South Australia against the tourists. In the fourth Test, Whitty produced his best Test performance with the bat, making 39 not out in an 82-run partnership with Vernon Ransford, which remained a record for the 10th wicket in Tests between the two nations until it was broken by Mike Hussey and Glenn McGrath in 2005–06.

Whitty was again selected in the Australian team for the first two Tests against England during their 1911–12 tour of Australia, but managed just 3 wickets at 61.67, and was left out of the team for the remainder of the five-Test series. Despite this performance, and partly due to a "boardroom brawl" which saw Australia leave behind many of its best players, Whitty was selected to tour England for the 1912 Triangular Test series, which also featured South Africa. The squad has often been described as "one of the worst teams Australia ever sent overseas", 10 of the 15 players having never travelled to England before. Whitty took 25 wickets in the 6 Test matches, including 7 wickets against England at The Oval, and 5/55 against South Africa at Old Trafford. He finished the tour with 109 wickets at 18.08, second only in averages to Charles Macartney.

South Australia took their 3rd Sheffield Shield in 1912–13, with Whitty taking figures of 5/65 in Melbourne and 5/92 (and a run out) in Sydney. He was selected in the Australian team scheduled to tour South Africa in 1914–15, but the tour was cancelled due to World War I, effectively ending Whitty's Test career.

During his Test career, Whitty also toured New Zealand, the United States, Canada and Bermuda. In the United States, at the end of the 1912 England tour, Australia incredibly lost to a Philadelphian team, with Whitty being one of only two players to score over 20 in Australia's first innings, before being bowled on the fourth delivery of the final over, with Australia needing 3 runs for victory.

== After World War I ==
Whitty continued to play domestically after the War ended, and was still good enough to regularly take 5-wicket hauls in first-class cricket up to the age of 38. Whitty played his final first-class game as New South Wales wrapped up the 1925–26 Sheffield Shield. A feature of Whitty's first-class career was his remarkable success bowling to his hero Trumper, with Whitty dismissing him seven times in ten innings – Trumper remaining not out in the other three.

At lower levels, Whitty played for East Torrens in Adelaide from 1908 to 1915, consistently taking over 50 wickets a season, and leading district bowling averages for four consecutive years from 1911. He played for Glenelg from 1920 to 1927, and continued playing in the Mount Gambier region until 1937. He was also an enthusiastic golfer, and at one stage played off scratch. From 1938 Whitty lived on his property at Tantanoola, where he died aged 87, the longest surviving of Australia's pre-WWI Test cricketers.

== Footnotes ==
1. "New South Wales v Queensland at Sydney Cricket Ground, 26–30 Dec 1907". Cricinfo. Archived from the original on 11 October 2004.
2. "Australian XI v Rest of Australia at Melbourne, 12–15 Feb 1909". Cricinfo. Archived from the original on 11 October 2004.
3. "Australian First-Class Season 1908/09: Bowling Averages". Cricinfo.
4. "1st TEST: England v Australia at Birmingham, 27–29 May 1909". Cricinfo. Archived from the original on 15 January 2007.
5. "New South Wales v South Australia at Sydney Cricket Ground, 8–11 Jan 1910". Cricinfo. Archived from the original on 15 November 2005.
6. Bill Whitty. espncricinfo.com
7. 200 Years of Australian Cricket 1997, p. 153
8. "2nd TEST: Australia v South Africa at Melbourne Cricket Ground, 31 Dec 1910 – 4 Jan 1911". Cricinfo. Archived from the original on 20 November 2004.
9. "South Australia v South Africans at Adelaide Oval, 10–13 Mar 1911". Cricinfo. Archived from the original on 28 September 2004.
10. Jim Maxwell, ed. (2005). The ABC Cricket Magazine 2005–06. Statistics compiled by Ric Finlay & David Fitzgerald. Sydney, Australia: Australian Broadcasting Corporation. p. 64.
11. "Hussey, McGrath star for Australia". Sydney Morning Herald. 27 December 2005.
12. Pollard 1982, p. 381
13. "3rd TEST: England v Australia at The Oval, 19–22 Aug 1912". Cricinfo. Archived from the original on 29 June 2004.
14. "1st TEST:Australia v South Africa at Manchester, 27–28 May 1912". Cricinfo. Archived from the original on 10 September 2004.
15. "Victoria v South Australia at Melbourne Cricket Ground, 1–3 Jan 1913". Cricinfo. Archived from the original on 27 September 2004.
16. "New South Wales v South Australia at Sydney Cricket Ground, 10–14 Jan 1913". Cricinfo. Archived from the original on 25 July 2004.
17. 200 Seasons of Australian Cricket 1997, p. 161
