= Roy Minnett =

Australian cricketer

- Minnett in 1912

Personal information
- Full name: Roy Baldwin Minnett
- Born: 13 June 1886; St Leonards, New South Wales, Australia
- Died: 21 October 1955 (aged 69); Manly, New South Wales, Australia
- Batting: Right-handed
- Bowling: Right-arm fast-medium

International information
- National side: Australia
- Test debut (cap 98): 15 December 1911 v England
- Last Test: 19 August 1912 v England

Domestic team information
- Years: Team
- 1906–07 to 1914–15: New South Wales

Career statistics
Competition	Tests	First-class
Matches	9	54
Runs scored	391	2142
Batting average	26.06	28.94
100s/50s	0/3	2/12
Top score	90	216*
Balls bowled	589	4155
Wickets	11	86
Bowling average	26.36	25.02
5 wickets in innings	0	3
10 wickets in match	0	1
Best bowling	4/34	8/50
Catches/stumpings	0/0	17/0
- Source: CricketArchive

Roy Baldwin Minnett (13 June 1886 – 21 October 1955) was an Australian cricketer who played in nine Test matches from December 1911 to August 1912. He became a medical practitioner.

== Life and career ==
Minnett was born in Sydney and attended Sydney Church of England Grammar School. He first played first-class cricket for New South Wales while he was studying medicine at Sydney University. A brilliant, sometimes impetuous batsman, fast-medium bowler and excellent fieldsman, he scored 151 in 150 minutes against Tasmania in January 1911. A year later he scored 216 not out in 197 minutes against Victoria at the Sydney Cricket Ground, adding 169 for the tenth wicket in 83 minutes with Cecil McKew. On his Test debut a few weeks earlier, also at the SCG, he had scored 90 in 111 minutes, adding 109 for the sixth wicket with Victor Trumper. He top-scored in the first innings of both the Fourth and Fifth Tests of the series, with 56 and 61 respectively.

Minnett toured England with the Australian team in 1912, but the damp conditions did not suit his play. He played in four of the six Tests, his best contribution being 4 for 34 in England's first innings at The Oval. It was his last Test match. He played a few more matches for New South Wales after the tour. In his last match, against Victoria at the Melbourne Cricket Ground in December 1914, he opened the bowling and took 8 for 50 off 24.2 overs, bowling unchanged through the innings. In January 1914 he toured Ceylon with a New South Wales team led by the Rev. E. F. Waddy, finishing at the top of the team's batting averages.

After 1914 the demands of his medical practice curtailed Minnett's cricket career. His older brothers, Leslie and Rupert, also played cricket for New South Wales.

== See also ==
- List of New South Wales representative cricketers
