= Bert Folkard =

Australian cricketer (1878–1937)

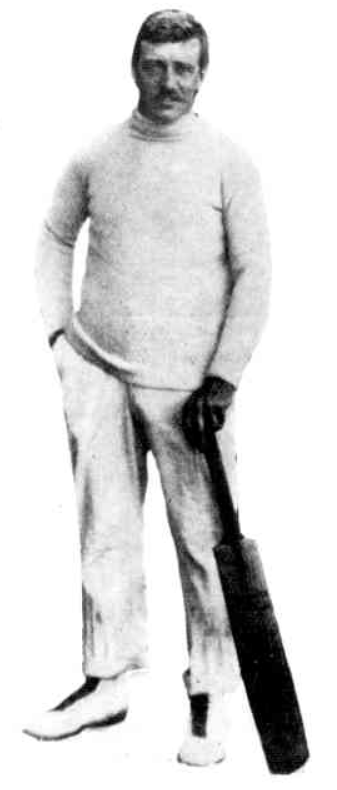

Personal information
- Full name: Bernard James Folkard
- Born: 17 May 1878; Sydney, Australia
- Died: 30 January 1937 (aged 58); Leichhardt, Sydney, Australia
- Batting: Right-handed
- Bowling: Right-arm medium
- Role: All-rounder

Domestic team information
- Years: Team
- 1910/11–1920/21: New South Wales

Career statistics
Competition	First-class
Matches	15
Runs scored	280
Batting average	13.33
100s/50s	0/1
Top score	61
Balls bowled	2,440
Wickets	45
Bowling average	26.97
5 wickets in innings	2
10 wickets in match	0
Best bowling	7/65
Catches/stumpings	9/–
- Source: Cricinfo, 25 August 2025

Bernard James "Bert" Folkard (17 May 1878 – 30 January 1937) was an Australian cricketer. He played fifteen first-class matches for New South Wales between 1910–11 and 1920–21.

Folkard was a right-handed all-rounder who batted aggressively, utilizing the pull shot especially, and bowled in-swingers slightly above medium pace. He played well for New South Wales and he was selected in the Australian Test squad to tour South Africa in 1914–15; however, the tour was cancelled due to the outbreak of the First World War. He was extremely successful for Balmain in grade cricket, being described by the Melbourne Sporting Globe as the second-best player in club cricket to Monty Noble since district cricket was established in New South Wales.

Folkard worked as the groundsman of the recreational fields at Callan Park Hospital for more than 30 years. He died in the Sydney suburb of Leichhardt on 30 January 1937, aged 58, leaving three sons and a daughter.
