= John McLaren (cricketer) =

Australian cricketer

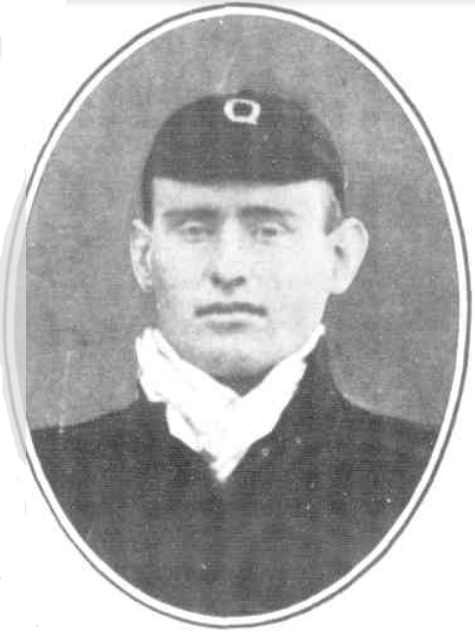

Personal information
- Full name: John William McLaren
- Born: 22 December 1886; Toowong, Queensland, Australia
- Died: 17 November 1921 (aged 34); Highgate Hill, Queensland, Australia
- Batting: Right-handed
- Bowling: Right-arm fast

International information
- National side: Australia
- Only Test (cap 100): 23 February 1912 v England

Domestic team information
- Years: Team
- 1906–07 to 1914–15: Queensland

Career statistics
Competition	Tests	First-class
Matches	1	34
Runs scored	0	564
Batting average	–	12.53
100s/50s	0/0	0/0
Top score	0*	43*
Balls bowled	144	5027
Wickets	1	107
Bowling average	70.00	26.74
5 wickets in innings	0	3
10 wickets in match	0	0
Best bowling	1/23	5/55
Catches/stumpings	0/–	8/–
- Source: Cricinfo, 28 April 2017

John William McLaren (22 December 1886 – 17 November 1921) was an Australian cricketer who played in one Test in 1912.

McLaren was born in Brisbane to William and Elizabeth McLaren. A fast bowler, he played first-class cricket for Queensland from 1906 to 1915. In 1907–08 he took five wickets against the touring English team, although Queensland lost by an innings. Three years later he took 5 for 55 and 3 for 75 against the touring South Africans.

McLaren became the first Queensland-born player to play Test cricket for Australia when he was selected for the Fifth Test of the 1911–12 Ashes series. He toured England with the Australian team in 1912, but did not play in any of the Tests. After the First World War, McLaren served as selector and manager for Queensland teams.

McLaren was diagnosed with diabetes in his early thirties, and died of the condition at his home in Brisbane in November 1921, aged 34, leaving a widow and a young son. He is buried in Brisbane's Toowong Cemetery.
