= William West (umpire) =

English cricketer and Test match umpire

Personal information
- Full name: William Arthur John West
- Nationality: British
- Born: 17 November 1863 Birmingham, England
- Died: 22 February 1938 (aged 74) Northampton, England

Sport
- Sport: boxing / cricket

William Arthur John West (17 November 1863 – 22 February 1938) was a boxer, a first-class cricketer and Test match umpire.

== Cricket ==
West played in five first-class matches for Marylebone Cricket Club, scoring 182 runs at 26 with a highest score of 74 against Lancashire. A right arm quick bowler, he also took five wickets at just 20 apiece.

West umpired the match between North and South in 1890 and continued to umpire for the next 45 years, until his final season in 1935, umpiring 657 first-class matches. He officiated in nine Test matches, from his first England v Australia test in 1896 to the 1912 Triangular Tournament featuring England, Australia and South Africa.

== Boxing ==
West won the Amateur Boxing Association 1885 heavyweight title, when boxing out of the Northampton ABC.
