= Walter Richards (umpire) =

English cricketer and Test match umpire

Personal information
- Full name: Walter Richards
- Born: 28 September 1863; Balsall Heath, Worcestershire, England
- Died: 14 October 1917 (aged 54); Birmingham, Warwickshire, England
- Batting: Right-handed
- Role: Umpire

Domestic team information
- Years: Team
- 1895–1896: Warwickshire

Umpiring information
- Tests umpired: 10 (1899–1912)
- FC umpired: 329 (1895–1914)

Career statistics
Competition	First-class
Matches	7
Runs scored	112
Batting average	11.20
100s/50s	–/1
Top score	61*
Balls bowled	–
Wickets	–
Bowling average	–
5 wickets in innings	–
10 wickets in match	–
Best bowling	–
Catches/stumpings	4/–
- Source: Cricinfo, 15 July 2012

Walter Richards (28 September 1863 – 14 October 1917) was an English first-class cricketer and Test match umpire.

Richards was born in Balsall Heath in Worcestershire (now part of Birmingham). A right-handed batsman, he played cricket for Warwickshire from 1883 until 1896. He made three centuries, against Yorkshire in 1889, against Hampshire in 1889, and against Cheshire in 1890, but all before Warwickshire achieved first-class status in 1894. He played seven games of first-class cricket after Warwickshire became a first-class county, six in 1895 and one in 1896. He achieved his highest first-class score of 61 not out against Lancashire in July 1895, his only first-class half century. He also took 4 catches in first-class matches.

He was an umpire in the University Match in 1895, and in the County Championship match between Yorkshire and Middlesex at Bramall Lane in August 1897. He was a regular first-class umpire from 1898 to 1914. He umpired 10 Test matches between 1899 and 1912, all played in England, six involving Australia and four South Africa

He made his debut as a Test umpire in the 5th Ashes Test in August 1899, played at the Oval, standing with Archibald White. His second Test as umpire was the 3rd Ashes Test in July 1902, the only Test match played at Bramall Lane. He umpired the 2nd Ashes Test, at Lord's, in June 1905, and then the 3rd Test, at the Oval, against South Africa in August 1907. He was umpire in the 3rd, 4th and 5th Ashes Tests in 1909, at Headingley, Old Trafford and the Oval, and umpired three matches between England and South Africa in the 1912 Triangular Tournament, at Headingley, Lord's and the Oval.

He died in Hollywood, Worcestershire, near Birmingham.
