= John Moss (umpire) =

English cricketer and umpire

Personal information
- Full name: John Moss
- Born: 7 February 1864; Clifton, Nottinghamshire, England
- Died: 10 July 1950 (aged 86); Keyworth, Nottinghamshire, England
- Batting: Right-handed
- Bowling: Right-arm medium
- Role: Umpire
- Relatives: John Butler (brother-in-law)

Domestic team information
- Years: Team
- 1892: Nottinghamshire

Umpiring information
- Tests umpired: 11 (1902–1921)

Career statistics
Competition	First-class
Matches	1
Runs scored	2
Batting average	1.00
100s/50s	–/–
Top score	1
Balls bowled	–
Wickets	–
Bowling average	–
5 wickets in innings	–
10 wickets in match	–
Best bowling	–
Catches/stumpings	–/–
- Source: Cricinfo, 7 April 2012

John Moss (7 February 1864 – 10 July 1950) was an English cricketer and umpire. Moss was a right-handed batsman who bowled right-arm medium pace. He was born at Clifton, Nottinghamshire.

Moss made a single first-class appearance for Nottinghamshire against the Marylebone Cricket Club at Lord's in 1892. It was as an umpire that he was more prominently remembered, standing in 665 first-class matches between 1894 and 1932, which included eleven Test matches between 1902 and 1921, the majority of which were Ashes matches between England and Australia.

He died at Keyworth, Nottinghamshire on 10 July 1950. His brother-in-law, John Butler, also played first-class cricket.
