= H. V. Hordern =

Australian cricketer

Ranji Hordern
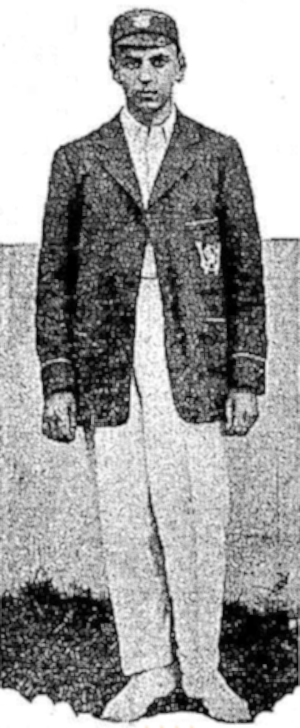

Cricket information
- Batting: Right-handed
- Bowling: Legbreak, googly

International information
- National side: Australia
- Test debut (cap 97): 17 February 1911 v South Africa
- Last Test: 23 February 1912 v England

Career statistics
Competition	Test	First-class
Matches	7	35
Runs scored	254	781
Batting average	23.09	16.97
100s/50s	0/1	0/3
Top score	50	64
Balls bowled	2,148	7,215
Wickets	46	228
Bowling average	23.36	16.36
5 wickets in innings	5	25
10 wickets in match	2	9
Best bowling	7/90	8/31
Catches/stumpings	6/0	39/0
- Source: CricketArchive, 29 May 2019

Dr. Herbert Vivian Hordern (10 February 1883 – 17 June 1938), also known as Ranji Hordern, was an Australian cricketer who played in seven Test matches between 1911 and 1912. He was the first major leg-spin and googly bowler to play for Australia. His nickname, "Ranji", came from his dark complexion, and is a reference to the famous Indian England test cricketer K S Ranjitsinhji. Hordern was a member of the Hordern family, well known as retailers in Sydney.

== Career ==
Hordern was born in North Sydney, New South Wales and made his debut in first-class cricket by taking 8 for 81 for New South Wales—and 11 wickets in the match—against Queensland in December 1905. He then moved to the United States to pursue his studies. While a student of dentistry at the University of Pennsylvania, he toured England in 1908 and Jamaica in 1908-09 with the Philadelphian cricket team. He played 17 first class matches for Philadelphians, and it was during his time in America that he perfected his googly.

Hordern returned to Australia in 1910. Owing to the foresight of Warren Bardsley, he found his way back into the state side immediately. After picking up 43 wickets in six matches in the 1910–11 season, he convinced the Australian selectors to follow Bardsley's lead. Chosen for the Fourth Test of the 1910–11 series against South Africa, he took fourteen wickets at an average of 21.07 in his two Tests in this series, including five in the second innings on debut.

Hordern's priority in life was his medical career, and he would for this reason miss most of New South Wales’ Sheffield Shield matches in 1911–12. Nevertheless, Hordern did make himself available for all five Tests against England and took 32 wickets at 24.37, including match figures of 12 for 135 in the first Test at Sydney, assisting Australia to their only win of the series. In the final game, also at Sydney, he took 10 for 161. By this time, he was being called the best bowler of his type in the world.

During the winter, Hordern had already declared himself unavailable for the tour to England in 1912, due both to his medical duties and to his budding marriage to Norah White. He would play for New South Wales three times in the 1912–13 season, and play a full season of district cricket for North Sydney that same year, but after three games in 1913–14 and one in 1914–15, Hordern would retire from playing even at this lower level.

He died at age 55 in Darlinghurst, New South Wales.

== Publications ==
- Googlies: Coals from a Test-Cricketer's Fireplace (Angus & Robertson: Sydney, 1932).
