= Tibby Cotter =

Australian cricketer (1883–1917)

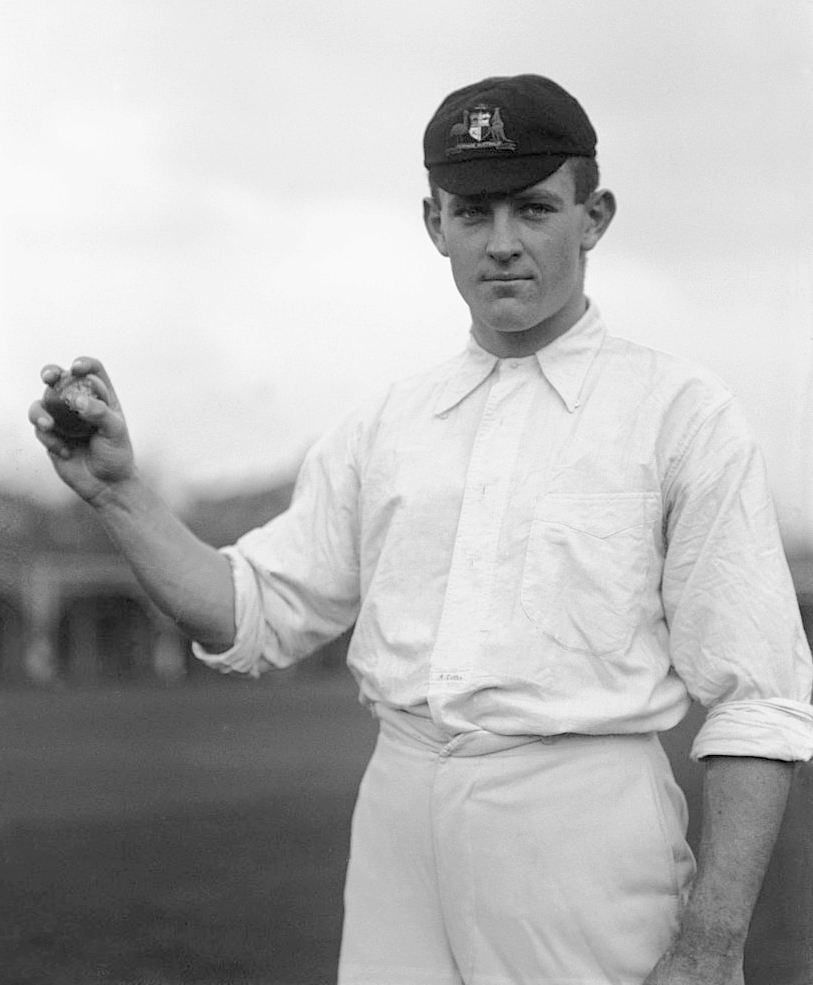
- Cotter in about 1905

Personal information
- Born: 3 December 1883; Sydney, New South Wales, Australia
- Died: 31 October 1917 (aged 33); Beersheba, Ottoman Palestine
- Height: 173 cm (5 ft 8 in)
- Batting: Right-handed
- Bowling: Right-arm fast

International information
- National side: Australia
- Test debut (cap 85): 26 February 1904 v England
- Last Test: 9 February 1912 v England

Career statistics
Competition	Test	First-class
Matches	21	113
Runs scored	457	2,484
Batting average	13.05	16.89
100s/50s	0/0	0/4
Top score	45	82
Balls bowled	4,633	19,565
Wickets	89	442
Bowling average	28.64	24.27
5 wickets in innings	7	31
10 wickets in match	0	4
Best bowling	7/148	7/15
Catches/stumpings	8/–	61/–
- Source: CricInfo, 14 October 2022
- Military career
- Allegiance: Australia
- Branch: Australian Army
- Service years: 1915–1917
- Rank: Trooper
- Units: 12th Light Horse Regiment, Australian Expeditionary Force
- Conflicts: First World War; Gallipoli campaign; Sinai and Palestine campaign; Second Battle of Gaza; Battle of Beersheba †

Albert "Tibby" Cotter (3 December 1883 – 31 October 1917) was an Australian cricketer who played in 21 Test matches between 1904 and 1912. He served in World War I with the First Australian Imperial Force and was killed in action in the mounted charge of the 4th Light Horse Brigade at Beersheba in Ottoman Palestine.

== Family ==
The sixth and youngest son of John Henry Cotter, (1839–1922) and Margaret Hay Cotter (1850–1936), née Pattison, Albert Cotter was born on 3 December 1883 in Sydney. He died in action, at Beersheba on 31 October 1917. One of his brothers, John, had been killed in action, at Broodseinde, Belgium, three weeks earlier, on 4 October 1917. Two other brothers, Arthur Dale (1877–1921), and Edwin (1880–1929) died in railway accidents.

== Cricketer ==
=== Fast bowler ===
Although only 5 ft 8 in (173 cm) tall—the same height as Harold Larwood—he was arguably the best fast bowler through the first decade of the 20th century, he had a reputation for breaking stumps. Early moving film of his action clearly shows a slinging action that was to cause controversy in England.

=== "Terror" Cotter ===
While regarded as the fastest of his era in Australia (his pace saw him nicknamed "'Terror' Cotter" by English fans) he did not always have the control to back it up, hitting W.G.Grace on the body with a full toss on his first tour of England.

=== Test Cricket ===
He took eight or more wickets in a match four times from his 21 Tests, and his strike rate of 52.0 precisely matches that of Dennis Lillee.

=== 1912 dispute ===
In February 1912, Cotter was one of the "Rebellious Six"—the other five were Warwick Armstrong, Hanson Carter, Clem Hill, Vernon Ransford, and Victor Trumper—each of whom, separately, declared themselves unavailable for selection in the Australian team to play against both England and South Africa in the Tri-Nation Cricket Tournament in England, in May 1912.

Following the events of 1912, he never played for Australia again.

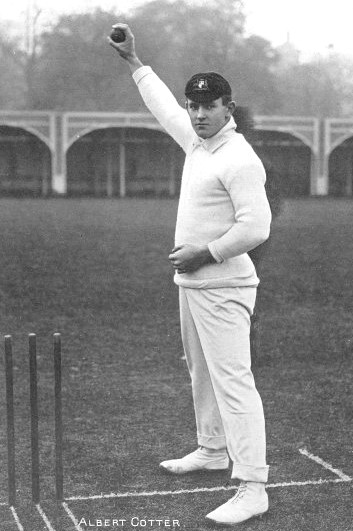
Tibby Cotter

== Military service ==
Cotter joined the Australian Imperial Force (AIF) in April 1915, aged 31. The enlistment of a former sporting champion was seen as powerful publicity for the AIF recruiting campaign.

Despite having no great riding ability, he was accepted into the 1st Australian Light Horse Regiment; he took a late part in the Gallipoli campaign. Later he transferred to the 12th Light Horse and was commended for his "fine work under heavy fire" during the Second Battle of Gaza. The official history remarked: "he behaved in action as a man without fear". He declined promotion.

While serving in the AIF, he participated in a unique Australia v. England "Test Match" played in 1917 between two teams made up from the Australian and British troops stationed in Palestine.

== Death ==
On 31 October 1917 the 4th Light Horse Brigade, of which the 12th Regiment was part, captured Beersheba by a brilliant cavalry-style charge. Although Cotter was there as a stretcher-bearer, he actually took part in the charge itself, and "was shot from the saddle during a mounted charge on a Turkish position":

"Cotter was killed in a mounted charge on Beersheba at dusk on the 31/10/17. Early next morning, together with Trooper O'Rourke of our troop, I was detailed to collect saddlery and personal effects. We were surprised to find Cotter amongst our casualties, knowing he had been detailed for that day as a stretcher bearer. It seems he had changed places with another Light Horseman because he wanted to be in the mounted charge." — "Ex-Trooper", The Crookwell Gazette, 1 March 1933.

At the end of the charge, as troops dismounted to engage the enemy, a Turk shot Cotter dead at close range.

== Legacy ==
The family home, "Monteith", 266 Glebe Point Road, Glebe, into which the family moved in 1891, is classified by the National Trust (see NSW State Heritage Register); and the adjoining "Cotter Lane", was so named in 1911.

On 25 January 1919, a memorial plaque dedicated to Cotter was unveiled in the members' pavilion of the Sydney Cricket ground during a break in play in the Sheffield Shield match between New South Wales and Victoria and in February 2015, the Albert Cotter Bridge opened across Anzac Parade, Sydney opposite the Sydney Cricket Ground. In 2017, in commemoration of the centenary of Cotter's death, the fourth round of Cricket NSW's Premier Cricket was designated the "Tibby Cotter Round".
