= Archibald White (umpire) =

English cricket umpire

Archibald White (1871–1920) was a Test match cricket umpire. He umpired 8 Test matches in all, from his first - the England v South Africa match at Johannesburg in February 1899 to his final outing in the England v South Africa test at the Oval in 1912.
