= Warren Bardsley =

Australian cricketer (1882–1954)

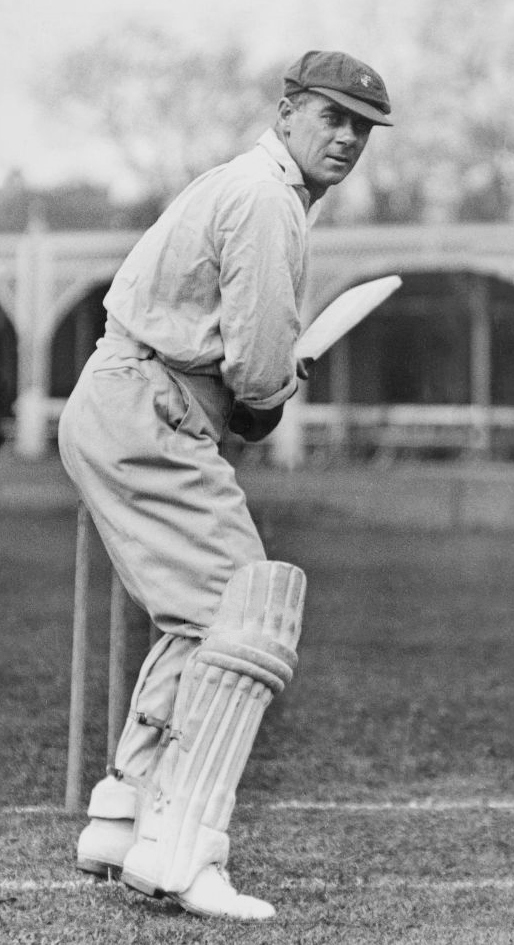
- Bardsley in 1926

Personal information
- Full name: Warren Bardsley
- Born: 6 December 1882; Warren, New South Wales, Australia
- Died: 20 January 1954 (aged 71); Sydney, New South Wales, Australia
- Batting: Left-handed
- Relatives: Mick Bardsley (brother)

International information
- National side: Australia
- Test debut (cap 94): 27 May 1909 v England
- Last Test: 18 August 1926 v England

Domestic team information
- Years: Team
- 1903–1926: New South Wales

Career statistics
Competition	Tests	First-class
Matches	41	250
Runs scored	2,469	17,031
Batting average	40.47	49.94
100s/50s	6/14	53/73
Top score	193 not out	264
Balls bowled	0	54
Wickets	–	0
Bowling average	–	–
5 wickets in innings	–	–
10 wickets in match	–	–
Best bowling	–	–
Catches/stumpings	12/–	113/–
- Source: CricketArchive, 26 January 2009

Warren "Curly" Bardsley (6 December 1882 – 20 January 1954) was an Australian Test cricketer. An opening batsman, Bardsley played 41 Tests between 1909 and 1926 and over 200 first-class games for New South Wales. He was Wisden's Cricketer of the Year in 1910.

== Career ==
A strong domestic season in 1908–09 – 748 runs from 9 innings at an average of 83.11 – led to Bardsley's inclusion in the 1909 Australian squad to tour England for the Ashes. After making his debut at Edgbaston, in the city of Birmingham, Bardsley struggled for runs in the Test arena, returning scores of 2, 6, 46, 0, 30, 2, 9 and 35 in his first eight innings. In the Fifth Test, at The Oval, London, however, Bardsley became the first Test cricketer to score a century – 100 runs or more – in both innings of a single Test match.

The 1910–11 series against South Africa in Australia was Bardsley's strongest Test series – 573 runs at 63.67 in nine innings. The following year, against England, he struggled somewhat and was replaced by the aging Syd Gregory for the Fifth Test. Bardsley returned to Test form in the inaugural Triangular Test series (featuring England, Australia and South Africa in England) ending the series as the leading run-scorer (392 runs at 65.33 from 6 innings).

World War I robbed Bardsley of five years of his playing career. By the time Test cricket resumed in 1920, Bardsley was aged in his late-thirties and his form was not the same. In the 21 Tests Bardsley played from 1920 to 1926, he managed only one century. Maintaining his position in the Australian Test squad proved to be difficult, especially considering the fine form of younger opening batsmen Bill Ponsford, Bill Woodfull and Herbie Collins. Despite his Test woes, domestically Bardsley continued to average in the high-30s to low-40s for New South Wales throughout much of the early 1920s.

Warren Bardsley was 43 years old when he made his last Test tour of England, in 1926. After captain Herbie Collins was felled by illness after the Second Test, the captaincy duties fell on Bardsley, despite his inexperience in that field. Both matches under Bardsley's tenure ended in a draw. Aged 43 years and 216 days, he was the oldest player to make captaincy debut. Bardsley played all five Tests in the 1926 series. His undefeated innings of 193 at Lord's in the Second Test was his highest Test score and made him the oldest player to score a Test century for Australia. It also created a record for the highest individual score in a Test Match at Lord's (beaten in 1930 by Bradman's 254).

== Personal life ==
After his retirement from Test and first-class cricket, Bardsley would briefly serve as a national selector. He continued to play club cricket for Glebe into his fifties. This longevity was attributed to rigorous exercise, rarely eating meat, and abstaining from alcohol and tobacco.

In 1945, aged 62, Bardsley married 45-year-old Gertrude Cope, his wife until his death in 1954. The last time they met, leaving the funeral of Dr. Rowley Pope, Jack Fingleton asked Bardsley his thoughts: "I was just thinking," said the old cricketer, "what a great bloke old Doc was. I was thinking of him, and then I just happened to see So-And-So across there, and I thought, Poor old so-and-so. By cripes, he's looking old. And then I thought, Well, I suppose some of them are looking at me and saying, 'Poor old Bards. By cripes, he's looking old!' That's just the trouble. We are all just poor old so-and-so's."

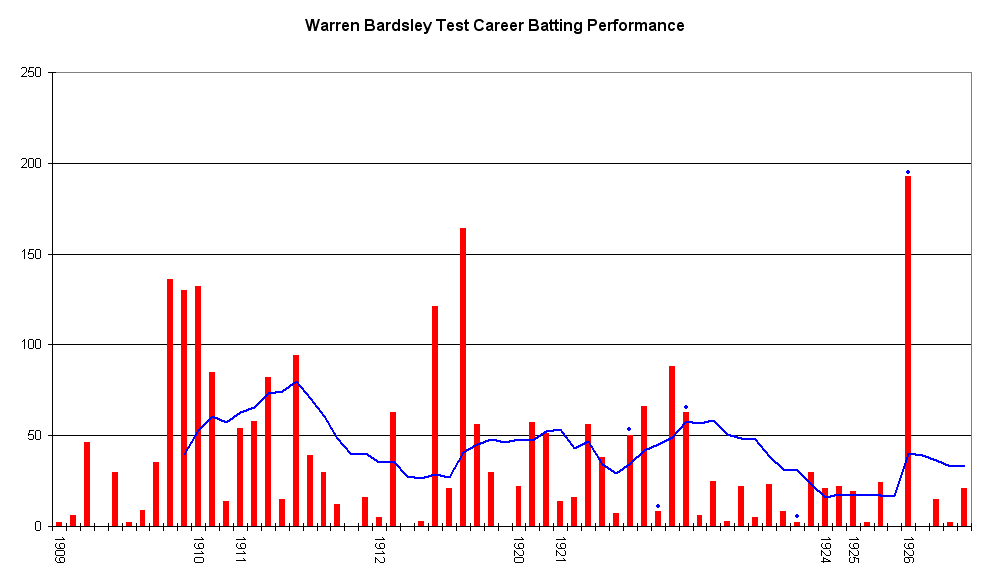
Bardsley's Test career performance graph.

Preceded by Herbie Collins	Australian Test cricket captains 1926	Succeeded by Jack Ryder
