= Sammy Carter =

Australian cricketer

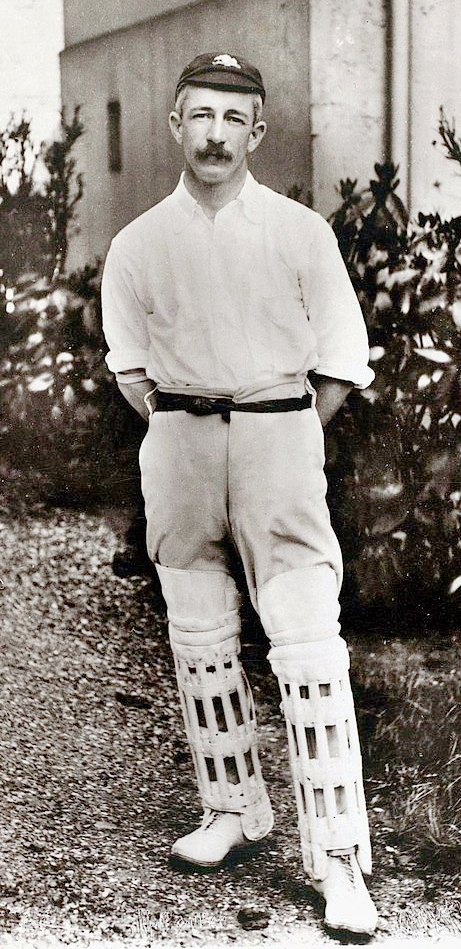
- Carter in about 1909

Personal information
- Born: 15 March 1878; Northowram, Yorkshire, England
- Died: 8 June 1948 (aged 70); Bellevue Hill, New South Wales, Australia
- Batting: Right-handed

International information
- National side: Australia
- Test debut (cap 88): 13 December 1907 v England
- Last Test: 26 November 1921 v South Africa

Career statistics
Competition	Test	First-class
Matches	28	128
Runs scored	873	2,897
Batting average	22.97	20.11
100s/50s	0/4	2/13
Top score	72	149
Catches/stumpings	44/21	181/89
- Source: Cricinfo, 12 October 2022

Hanson "Sammy" Carter (15 March 1878 – 8 June 1948) was a cricketer who played for Australia and New South Wales.

== Career ==
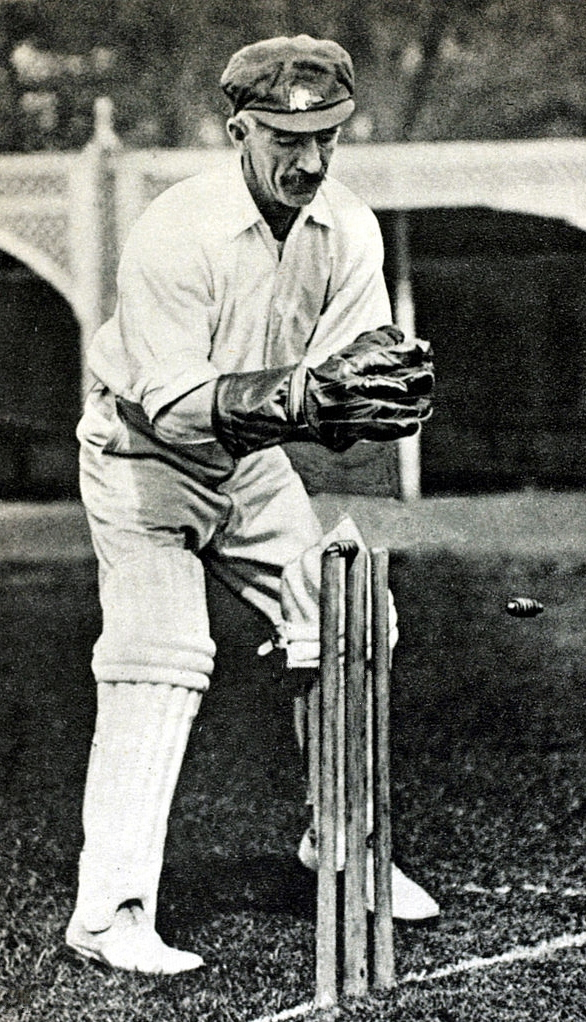
Carter keeping

Carter attended Sydney Boys High School in 1894. A wicket-keeper, he made his debut for New South Wales in 1897–98, and after two matches in 1901–02 he was selected to tour England in 1902 as the deputy wicket-keeper.

He played his first Test in 1907–08, when he played all five Tests against England. He toured England again in 1909, playing all five Tests, and he also played all five Tests when South Africa toured in 1910–11, and when England toured in 1911–12. He resumed his Test career for the last two Tests against England in 1920–21, although he was nearly 43, and toured England in 1921, playing four Tests, and South Africa in 1921–22, playing his last two Tests.

In all he took 44 catches and 21 stumpings in 28 Test matches. As a batsman, he is often credited with the invention of the scoop shot that sails over fine-leg. He often made useful runs, though in Tests he seldom batted higher than number 10. His highest Test score was 72, batting at number 3 as nightwatchman, against England in Adelaide in 1911–12. His highest first-class score was 149 for New South Wales against Queensland in 1904–05.

He was the first wicket-keeper to squat on his haunches rather than bend over from the waist.

In 1932, at the age of 54, he toured the U.S. and Canada with an unofficial side captained by Vic Richardson.

In 1946 the England captain Wally Hammond and Major Rupert Howard (Secretary of Lancashire County Cricket Club and MCC tour manager) went to visit Sammy Carter in Sydney. The wicketkeeper of Warwick Armstrong's 1921 Australians, who now used a wheelchair, had donated £1,000 to the restoration of the Old Trafford cricket ground which had been bombed during the war. They wished to give him their personal thanks.

He worked as an undertaker, sometimes coming to matches in a hearse.
