= Victor Trumper =

Australian cricketer (1877–1915)

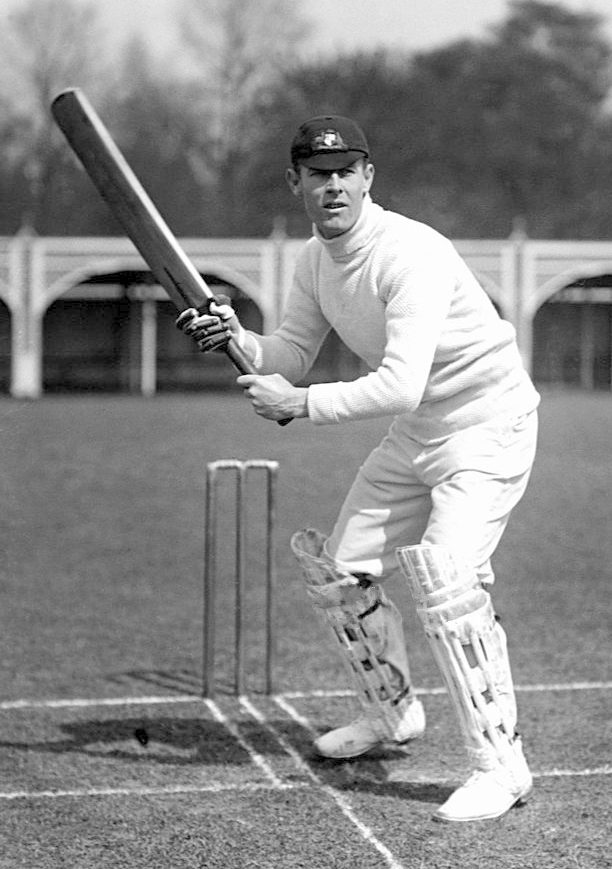
- Trumper photographed in 1905 by George Beldam

Personal information
- Full name: Victor Thomas Trumper
- Born: 2 November 1877 (Note: No definitive record of Trumper's birth has been found.); Darlinghurst, New South Wales
- Died: 28 June 1915 (aged 37); Darlinghurst, New South Wales
- Batting: Right-handed
- Bowling: Right arm medium
- Role: Batter

International information
- National side: Australia (1899–1912)
- Test debut (cap 79): 1 June 1899 v England
- Last Test: 1 March 1912 v England

Domestic team information
- Years: Team
- 1894/95–1913/14: New South Wales

Career statistics
Competition	Test	First-class
Matches	48	255
Runs scored	3,163	16,939
Batting average	39.04	44.57
100s/50s	8/13	42/87
Top score	214*	300*
Balls bowled	546	3,852
Wickets	8	64
Bowling average	39.62	31.37
5 wickets in innings	0	2
10 wickets in match	0	0
Best bowling	3/60	5/19
Catches/stumpings	31/–	173/–
- Source: CricketArchive, 1 March 2026

Victor Thomas Trumper (2 November 1877 – 28 June 1915) was an Australian professional cricketer. A right-handed batter and a right arm medium pace bowler, Trumper is generally regarded as one of the greatest batters in cricket history. He played for New South Wales from 1894/95 to 1913/14, and represented Australia in 48 Test matches.

Trumper is lauded as the most stylish and versatile batsman of cricket's so-called Golden Age (c. 1890–1914), capable of playing match-winning innings on wet wickets which his contemporaries found unplayable. An action photograph of Trumper, taken by George Beldam in 1905, is often considered to be the greatest cricketing photograph ever taken.

Trumper was also a key figure in the foundation of rugby league in Australia and played first grade rugby union and baseball.

== Early life ==
Trumper was born in Sydney, probably on 2 November 1877; no definite record of his birth exists. Despite that, it is accepted that his parents were Charles Thomas Trumper and his wife Louise, née Coghlan, who were married on 15 May 1883. Charles Trumper was a footwear manufacturer.

Trumper was educated at Crown Street Superior Public School, and showed early ability as a cricketer. When he was 16, he joined the South Sydney Cricket Club, where he was mentored by Syd Gregory. Trumper was selected to play for New South Wales Juniors against the touring England team on 22 December 1894. Despite a bad cold, he scored 67 runs. That impressed the New South Wales Cricket Association, and Trumper was selected to play for New South Wales against South Australia in January 1895.

Outside of cricket, Trumper in his youth played first-grade standard rugby union, Australian rules football and baseball. He played rugby union as a fullback for Crown Street Public School and by 1897 had progressed to the first XV of the Newtown rugby club. In a rugby match at the Sydney Cricket Ground (SCG) on 29 May 1897, Trumper kicked a drop goal (worth four points). In 1898 he was chosen for a "Combined Juniors" representative team, but after breaking his collarbone, retired from rugby in 1901. In his early twenties, Trumper also played baseball for the Paddington club, representing New South Wales in interstate fixtures against Victoria at the SCG in 1900 and 1903.

== Cricket career ==
=== Debut ===
The match against South Australia took place at the Adelaide Oval from 5 to 9 January 1895. It was 17-year old Trumper's debut in both first-class cricket and the Sheffield Shield. He batted sixth in New South Wales' first innings, and was run out for 11. In the second innings, he batted ninth, and was out without scoring. South Australia won the match by 4 wickets.

=== Australian tour of England, 1902 ===
1902 in England was one of the wettest summers on record. Nevertheless, Trumper in 53 first-class innings scored 2,570 runs, and without a single not out had an average of 48.49 with eleven centuries and eleven half-centuries. Australia won a memorable Test series 2–1 with victories at Bramall Lane (3rd Test) and Old Trafford (4th). England won the final Test at The Oval. In the Old Trafford match, Trumper was outstanding and became the first player to score a century on the first morning of a Test match, scoring 103 before lunch. Alan Gibson quotes Harry Altham saying: "From start to finish of the season, on every sort of wicket, against every sort of bowling, Trumper entranced the eye, inspired his side, demoralized his enemies, and made run-getting appear the easiest thing in the world".

=== Famous photograph ===
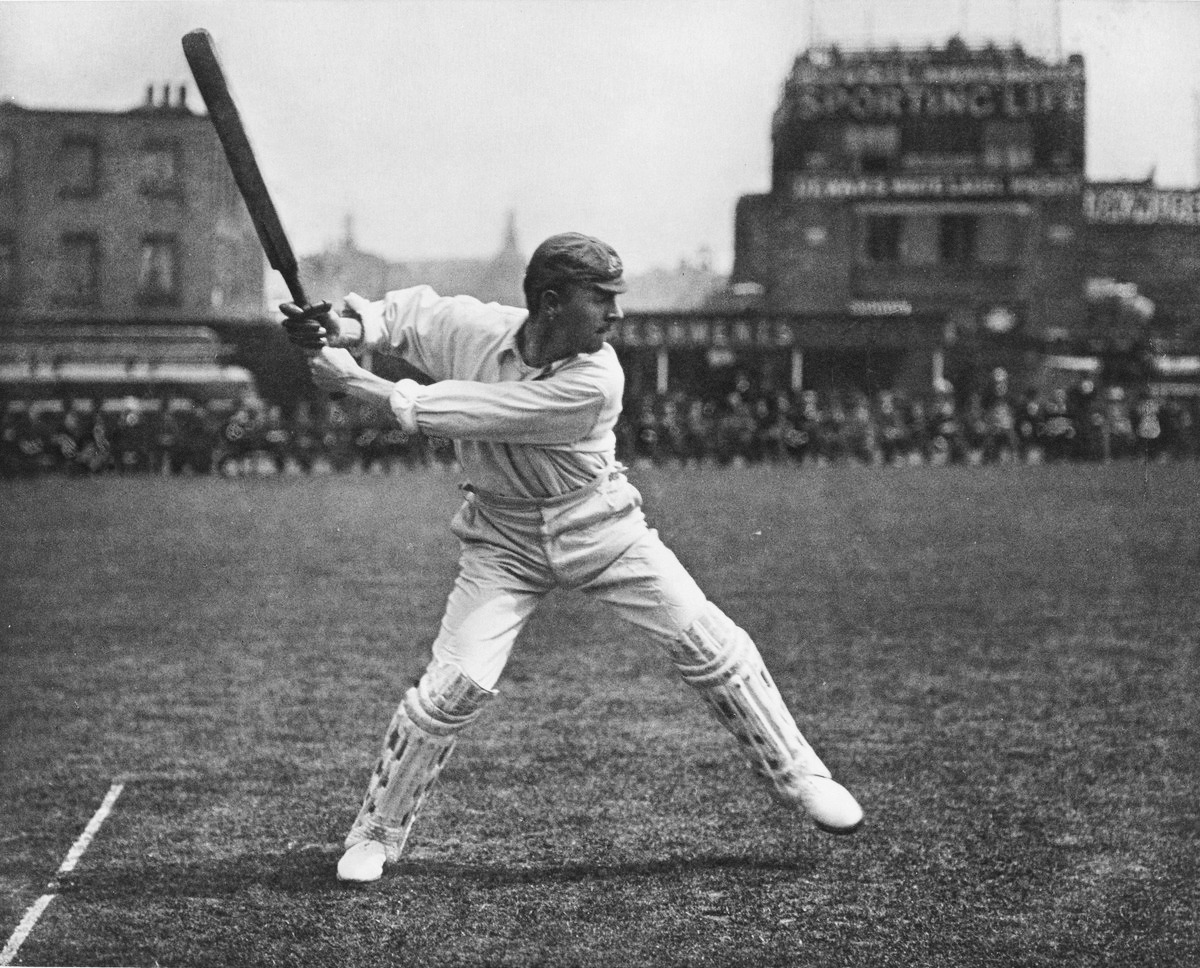
"Jumping out for a straight drive"—famous action shot of Trumper taken by George Beldam in 1905.

George Beldam's image of Trumper (see right) leaping out to drive, arguably the most famous of all cricketing photographs, has been described as a "classic picture", and as the "essence" of the Golden Age of batting.

=== Health issues ===
In the mid-1900s, Trumper's health declined to the point where he missed the 1908/09 season due to illness.

=== Record 8th wicket partnership ===
Trumper's innings of 293, for an Australian XI against Canterbury at Lancaster Park in 1913–14, was scored in a little over three hours. It was made in partnership with Arthur Sims (184 not out), and their stand of 433 remains the world record for the eighth wicket in first-class cricket. Trumper's innings remains the highest score by a number nine batsman.

== Business ==
In August 1904, Trumper, with Hanson Carter, opened a sports store in Market Street, Sydney. In 1909, with other associates, he opened a sports and mercery store in George Street, Sydney which, in 1912, became Victor Trumper and Dodge Ltd.

== Rugby league ==
Although he is best known for his prowess as a cricketer, Trumper was also a competent rugby league player, and could lay claim to being one of the prime movers in the development of rugby league in Australia.

He hosted meetings at his store during 1907 as players became increasingly discontented about the game's administration. On 8 August 1907 at Bateman's Crystal Hotel, George Street, Sydney independent politician Henry Hoyle chaired a meeting of fifty, comprising several leading rugby players and officials. The New South Wales Rugby Football League, the body that would go on to conduct the major national rugby league premiership of Australia, was founded and Trumper was elected its first treasurer.

== Death ==
Trumper's health declined rapidly in 1914, and he died as a result of Bright's disease in Darlinghurst, Sydney, on 28 June 1915, aged 37. He was buried in Waverley Cemetery, and was survived by his wife Sarah, his daughter Nancy (aged 9), and his son Victor junior (aged 1). It has been estimated that some 20,000 mourners lined the route of his funeral.

== Recognition ==
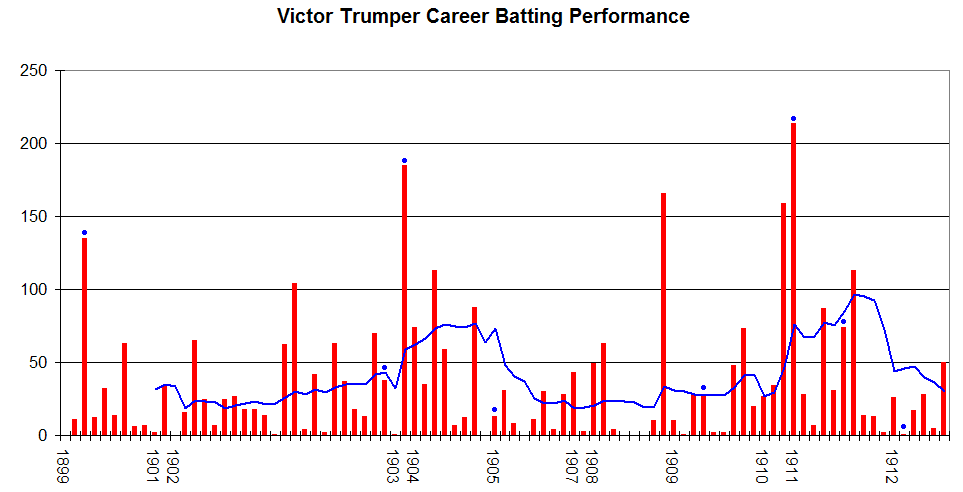
Victor Trumper's career performance graph.

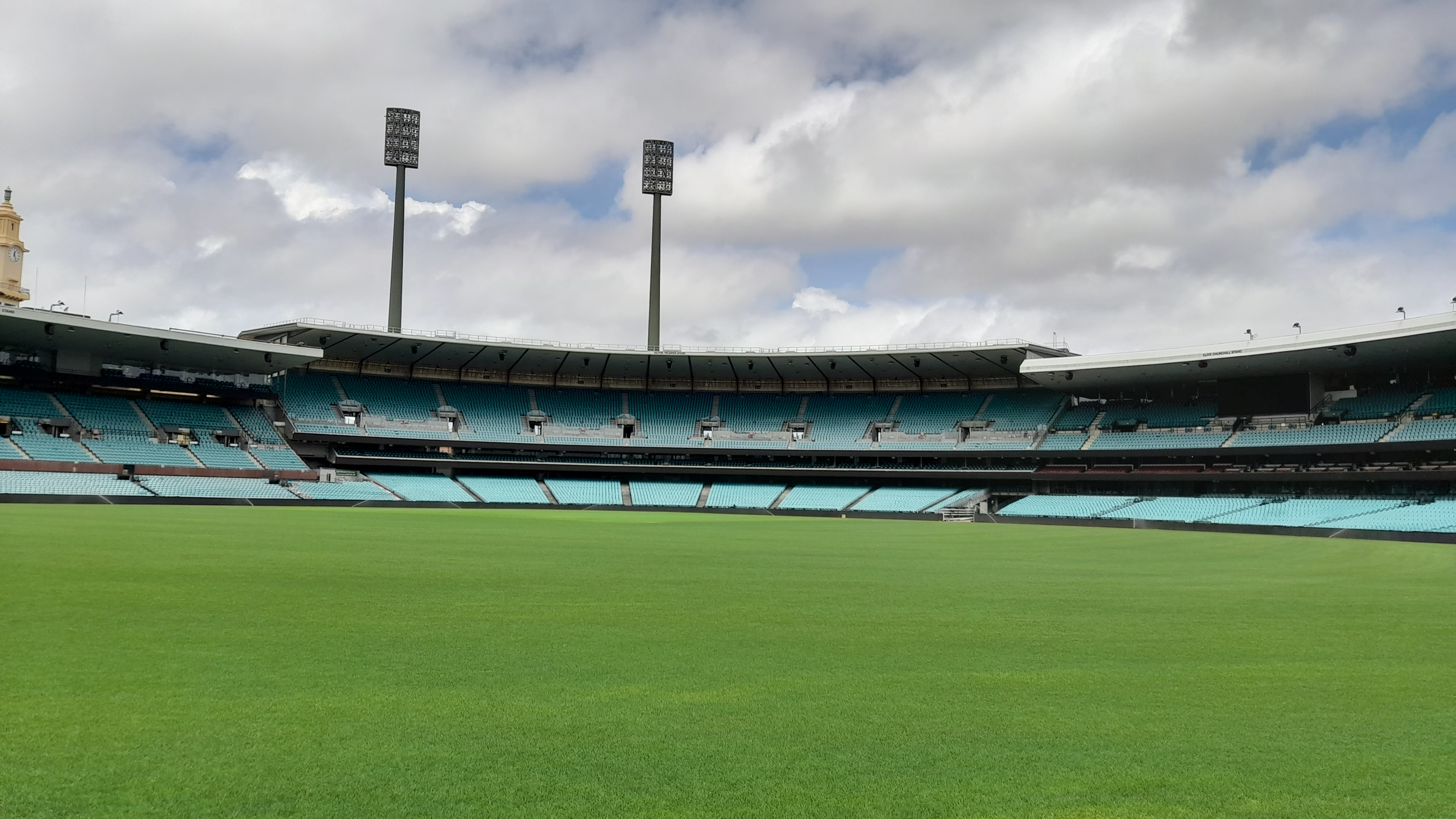
The Victor Trumper Stand at the Sydney Cricket Ground, built in 2008

Trumper was named a Wisden Cricketer of the Year in 1903. In the 1963 edition of Wisden Cricketers' Almanack, he was selected by Neville Cardus as one of the Six Giants of the Wisden Century. This was a special commemorative selection requested by Wisden for its 100th edition. The other five players chosen were Sydney Barnes, Don Bradman, W. G. Grace, Jack Hobbs, and Tom Richardson.

In 1981, Trumper was honoured on a postage stamp issued by Australia Post, depicting a cartoon image by Tony Rafty. In 1996, he was one of the ten inaugural inductees into the Australian Cricket Hall of Fame, the others being Fred Spofforth, Jack Blackham, Clarrie Grimmett, Bill Ponsford, Don Bradman, Bill O'Reilly, Keith Miller, Ray Lindwall, and Dennis Lillee.

Trumper Park Oval in Paddington, New South Wales is named in his honour, as is the Trumper Pavilion at Chatswood Oval.

In a CricketArchive profile, writer Dave Livermore says: "in the judgement of all who saw him, Trumper stands amongst the greats, as much for the style and grace with which he batted as much as the number of runs he scored".

== Bibliography ==
- Barclays (1986). Swanton, E. W.; Plumptre, George; Woodcock, John (eds.). Barclays World of Cricket. London: HarperCollins. ISBN 978-00-02181-93-8.
- Gibson, Alan (1989). The Cricket Captains of England. London: Cassell. ISBN 978-03-04297-79-5.
