= Herbie Collins =

Australian cricketer and rugby league footballer

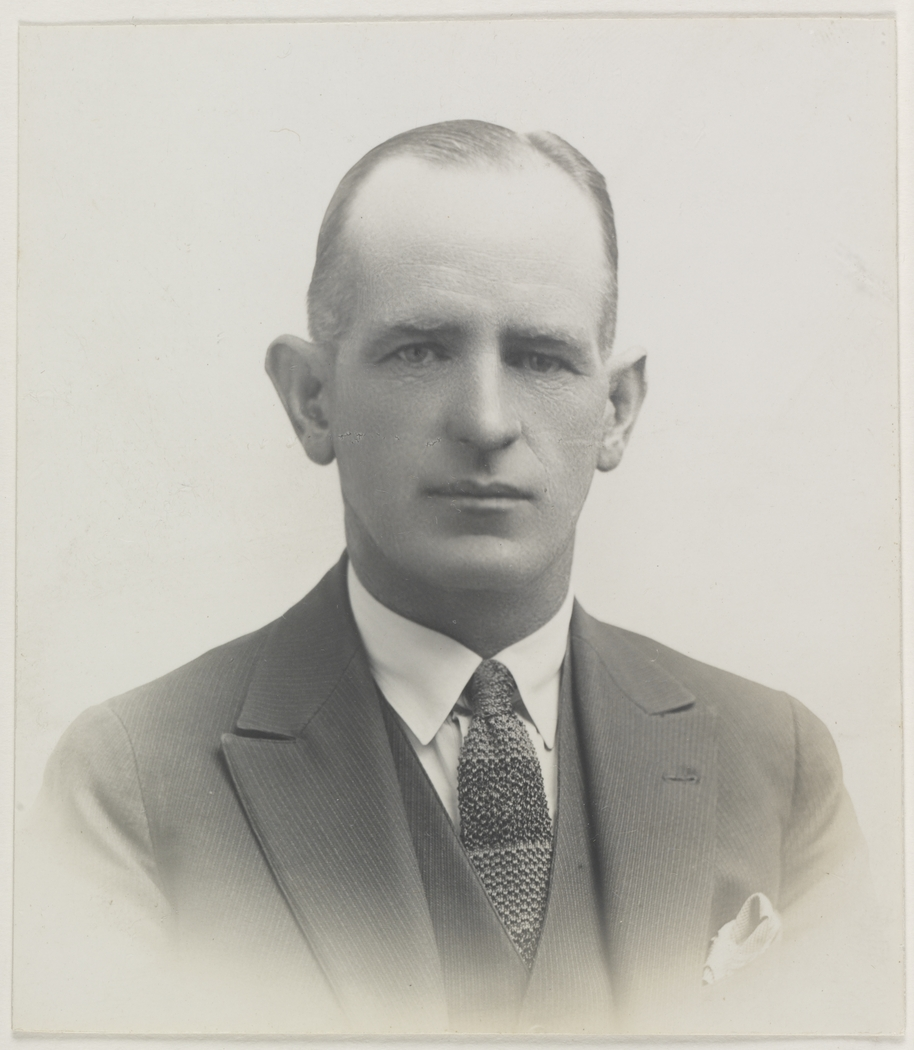

Personal information
- Full name: Herbert Leslie Collins
- Born: 21 January 1888; Darlinghurst, New South Wales, Australia
- Died: 28 May 1959 (aged 71); Little Bay, New South Wales, Australia
- Height: 5 ft 8 in (1.73 m)
- Batting: Right-handed
- Bowling: Slow left arm orthodox
- Role: All-rounder
- Relatives: Reginald Collins (brother)

International information
- National side: Australia
- Test debut (cap 106): 17 December 1920 v England
- Last Test: 14 August 1926 v England

Domestic team information
- Years: Team
- 1909/10–1925/26: New South Wales

Career statistics
| Competition | Test | First-class |
|---|---|---|
| Matches | 19 | 168 |
| Runs scored | 1,352 | 9,924 |
| Batting average | 45.06 | 40.01 |
| 100s/50s | 4/6 | 32/40 |
| Top score | 203 | 282 |
| Balls bowled | 654 | 9,987 |
| Wickets | 4 | 181 |
| Bowling average | 63.00 | 21.38 |
| 5 wickets in innings | 0 | 8 |
| 10 wickets in match | 0 | 2 |
| Best bowling | 2/47 | 8/31 |
| Catches/stumpings | 13/– | 113/– |
- Source: CricketArchive, 1 January 2006
- Rugby league career

Playing information
- Position: Five-eighth
Club
| Years | Team | Pld | T | G | FG | P |
|---|---|---|---|---|---|---|
| 1911 | Eastern Suburbs | 4 | 0 | 0 | 0 | 0 |
- Military career
- Spouse: Marjorie Paine (m. 1940; div. 1951)
- Allegiance: Australia
- Branch: Australian Army
- Service years: 1915-1918; 1940-1945
- Rank: Sergeant
- Unit: First Australian Imperial Force (AIF)
- Conflicts: World War I; Sinai and Palestine Campaign; Western Front; World War II

Herbert Leslie Collins (21 January 1888 – 28 May 1959) was an Australian cricketer who played 19 Test matches between 1921 and 1926. An all-rounder, he captained the Australian team in eleven Tests, winning five, losing two with another four finishing in draws. In a Test career delayed by First World War he scored 1,352 runs at an average of 45.06, including four centuries. Collins was also a successful rugby league footballer, winning the 1911 NSWRFL season's grand final with the Eastern Suburbs club.

Collins was a keen gambler, a pastime that became habitual during his time as a soldier in the Great War. After the war, he played with the Australian Imperial Forces cricket team (AIF XI) that toured England, South Africa and Australia and was later appointed captain of the team. He was not a stylish or forceful batsman, preferring to rely on nudges and deflections to score runs. His slow left arm off-spin, bowled from a two step run up, was seldom seen after the AIF XI tour. On return to Australia, he made his Test début against England at the Sydney Cricket Ground (SCG) scoring 104 in the second innings; the fifth Australian to score a century on Test début. He was appointed captain of the Australian team in 1921 in South Africa, when the previous captain, Warwick Armstrong, fell ill.

His Test career finished in disappointment and in a cloud of suspicion when Australia lost the Fifth Test and the Ashes against England in 1926. While some former players and cricket administrators suspected a case of match fixing, no material evidence supporting this has emerged. After his retirement from cricket, Collins used his gambling knowledge to start a career in horse racing, working as a bookmaker and commission agent.

== Early career ==
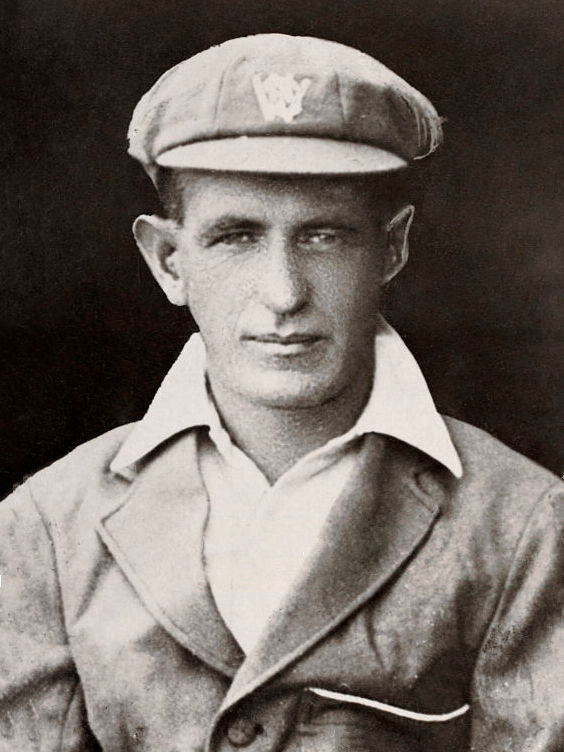
Herbie Collins, ca. 1920

Collins was born in Darlinghurst, an inner suburb of Sydney, the son of Thomas, an accountant, and Emma (née Charlton). He attended Albion Street (Superior) Public School, where he showed an aptitude for cricket and rugby union. He played his early cricket with Paddington Cricket Club, bowling left arm spinners and batting well enough to be selected at 19 for the New South Wales cricket team (NSW).

He made his first-class cricket debut against South Australia in 1909–10, scoring three and one and taking 1/35. He played one further match for the season, against Victoria. For the next two seasons, his opportunities at first-class level were limited but he played against the touring South African and English sides.

Collins also played first grade rugby league at this time in the New South Wales Rugby Football League premiership. He played at five-eighth in Eastern Suburbs' grand final win of the 1911 NSWRFL season alongside the great Dally Messenger. He is sometimes confused with the Bert Collins who played in Brisbane for Toombul's club, gaining selection for Queensland in 1912.

Collins's first full season for NSW was in 1912–13, playing ten matches and scoring 598 runs at an average of 42.71. He finished the season with 282 against Tasmania at Hobart. During the 1913 Australian winter, Collins was part of an Australian team that toured North America, which included matches against Gentlemen of Philadelphia and a combined Canada–United States team.

== First World War and Services XI ==
In 1915 Collins was one of 417,000 Australians who enlisted and was a member of the First Australian Imperial Force (AIF) as a reinforcement for the Australian Light Horse, serving with the Army Service Corps. He served in the Sinai and Palestine Campaign and later on the Western Front, carting ammunition to the artillery shelling the German lines. At the end of the War, Collins was a Lance Corporal.

Following the war he was included in an Australian Imperial Forces cricket team, touring England in 1919. Charles Kelleway, an officer, was the captain of the team for the first six matches. Despite Collins's rank, General Birdwood, the former commander of the Australian Corps, asked him to take over the captaincy for the remainder of the tour. Some of his colleagues were officers, such as Jack Gregory and Nip Pellew. Collins proved a capable and popular captain with the team losing only four of 28 matches during the tour. He scored 1,615 runs including five centuries at an average of 38.45 and took 106 wickets at 16.55 apiece.

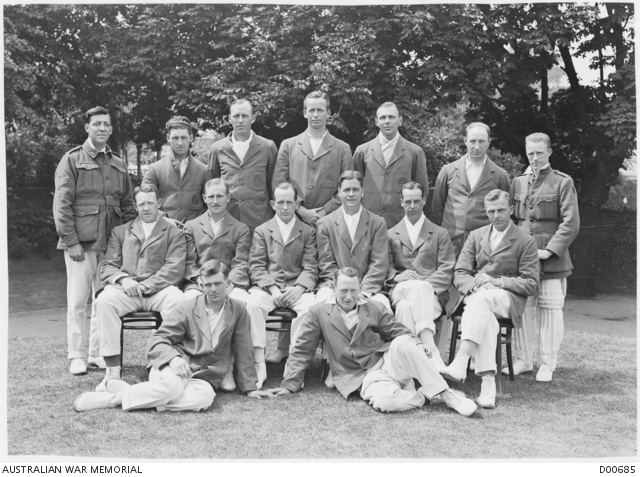
Collins with the AIF team in London, 1919

On their way home the AIF team played ten matches in South Africa, eight of them first-class, remaining undefeated in this section of the tour. While Jack Gregory relished the conditions, the local newspapers acclaimed Collins as the finest player in the touring team. Collins scored 602 runs in South Africa at an average of 50.58 and took 39 wickets at 16.53. In a match at the Old Wanderers ground in Johannesburg against the South African XI, Collins scored 235 from a total of 441 in the first innings as the AIF XI won by 8 wickets.

On arrival back in Australia, the AIF team played three first-class matches, defeating the reigning Sheffield Shield champions New South Wales and Victoria. A likely victory against Queensland was frustrated due to torrential rain. The results in Australia demonstrated the strength of the AIF team. Within a few months of the team's dissolution, Collins made his Test début, along with his AIF team-mates, Gregory, wicket-keeper Bert Oldfield and the batsmen Johnny Taylor and Nip Pellew.

== Test career ==
=== Début ===
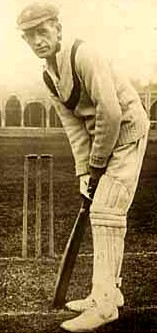
Collins's batting stance

Test cricket returned from its hiatus in 1920 with the English touring Australia. Collins, also a selector, was one of six AIF XI players to make his début in the First Test of that series. The First Test was played on Collins's home ground, the Sydney Cricket Ground and Collins had reason to feel at home, scoring 70 and 104. Collins was only the fifth Australian to make a century on Test début. Collins scored another century in the Third Test at the Adelaide Oval, batting 258 minutes for 162, helping Australia to a 119 run victory. Over the 1920–21 series, Collins made 557 runs at an average of 61.88.

The Australians toured England in 1921, the first representative tour since the disastrous 1912 Triangular Tournament, and won the series comprehensively, three Tests to nil. In the First Test at Trent Bridge, Collins broke his thumb, ruling him out of the next two internationals. He returned to the team for the Fourth Test, after Australia had already wrapped up the series. England had fought back well and Australia were forced to defend grimly. Batting for over four and a half hours with what Wisden described as "inexhaustible patience", Collins scored 40 runs in Australia's only innings to force a draw. Collins scored 1,222 runs in all matches on tour at an average of 33.94.

=== Captain ===
On the return trip to Australia, the Australian team stopped in South Africa for a short tour. Due to illness, captain Warwick Armstrong was unable to take part in any of the matches and as a result Collins was appointed captain in his place. The first two Tests were drawn but Australia won the third Test and the series at Cape Town. In the second Test of the series, Collins scored a remarkable double century (203) on the matting pitch at the Old Wanderers ground in Johannesburg, unearthing a range of shots he had rarely used. With Gregory, who scored 119, the pair put on a partnership of 209 in 85 minutes, destroying the South African bowling. In six matches played, Collins scored 548 runs, including two centuries at an average of 60.88.

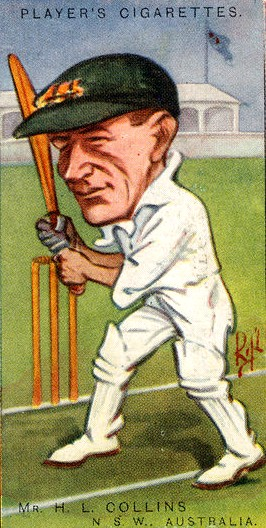
Caricature of Collins on a cigarette card

The next international visitors to Australia were the English team of 1924–25, under the captaincy of Arthur Gilligan. In the First Test at Sydney, Collins opened the batting and scored 114. Batting with a young Victorian in his début Test, Bill Ponsford, Collins sheltered him from the brilliant swing bowling of Maurice Tate. Ponsford went on to make a century (110) on début. Ponsford later said, "I was most grateful for Herbie taking [Tate's bowling] until I was settled in. I doubt I would have scored a century but for his selfless approach." In the Second Test at Melbourne, chasing 600, the English pair of Jack Hobbs and Herbert Sutcliffe batted throughout the third day for an unbroken partnership of 283. Before play commenced the next day, Collins said to Mailey, his leg spinner, "You're going straight on to get Hobbs if we're to have a chance". The first ball of the day, Mailey bowled a full toss. Collins moved the field, leaving a gap in the offside field. The next ball was another full toss and Hobbs, looking to hit it into the gap, missed it and was bowled for 154.

The Adelaide Test was a thriller with England needing 27 runs to win with two wickets in hand. Collins, ever the gambler, threw the ball once again to Mailey, who was not known for his accuracy or containment. The gamble paid off with Mailey dismissing Tich Freeman and Gregory removing Gilligan at the other end to win the Test by eleven runs and secure The Ashes. Australia won the series four Tests to one. During the Adelaide Test, Collins was approached by a "well known racing identity" who offered him £100 to throw the match. Collins rejected the approach and suggested to teammate Arthur Mailey that they throw the visitor down the stairs.

=== Controversy and retirement ===
The 1926 tour of England would be Collins's last. Partly as a result of a wet English summer, the first four Tests of the five-Test series ended in draws. Collins had a disappointing tour, suffering from neuritis and in constant pain from arthritis. He missed the Third and Fourth Tests when admitted to hospital but recovered to resume his place as captain for the Fifth Test.

The Fifth Test, played at the Oval, saw England win the toss and bat. They compiled 280, Mailey taking five wickets. Australia responded with 302, dismissed late on the second day. At stumps, England – in their second innings – were 0/49. A violent thunderstorm inundated the ground overnight, rendering the pitch sticky. Collins attracted a great deal of negative attention by using the inexperienced Arthur Richardson as a main strike bowler at the expense of the likes of Mailey and Clarrie Grimmett. The English openers, Hobbs and Sutcliffe, took advantage of this by compiling a 172-run opening partnership. England were bowled out in their second innings for 436, 415 runs ahead. Australia were dismissed for 125, losing the match by 289 runs. The Test was to be Collins's last.

Such was the disappointment at losing the Ashes, Collins was stripped not only of the New South Wales captaincy but also that of his local club, Waverley. Former players, including his former Waverley captain, the influential Monty Noble, publicly criticised Collins' captaincy. Hunter Hendry, viewing the Fifth Test from the stands, suspected Collins threw the match. Despite his reputation as a gambler, there is no material evidence that Collins ever fixed the result of any cricket match.

== Rugby league career ==
In the 1911 cricket off-season Collins played rugby league for Sydney's Eastern Suburbs club. A five-eighth, Collins played alongside rugby league "immortal", Dally Messenger when the Eastern Suburbs club won its first ever premiership. He is sometimes confused with the Bert Collins who played in Brisbane for Toombul's club and represented Queensland on three occasions.

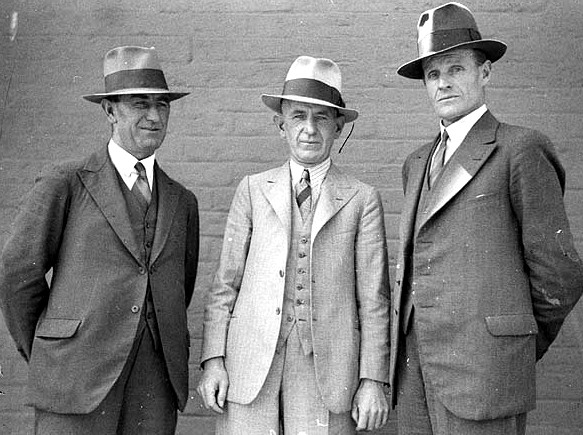
Collins (centre) with fellow NSW selectors and ex-Test teammates Charlie Kelleway and Tommy Andrews in the 1930s

== Outside cricket ==
Collins was an enthusiastic gambler, renowned by his teammates for finding any reason to bet. Mailey stated that Collins's haunts "were the racetrack, the dog track, a baccarat joint at Kings Cross, a two-up school in the Flanders trenches and anywhere a quiet game of poker was being played." His New South Wales teammate Hal Hooker remarked of Collins:

He would bet on anything — perhaps he was the original of the saying about flies crawling up the window. Waiting on a railway line he would bet on how many trains would pass through the opposite platform, how many carriages would be on the next one, how many carriage windows would be open. In a train he would produce a brass top stamped Put and Take — he paid or collected according to which way it fell when it stopped spinning.

Collins was known for all-night poker sessions before going out to open the batting but refused to play poker against his fellow cricketers, seeing no challenge in taking money from novices. His gambling attracted some criticism and Collins was seen by many, including some cricket administrators, as an inveterate gambler.

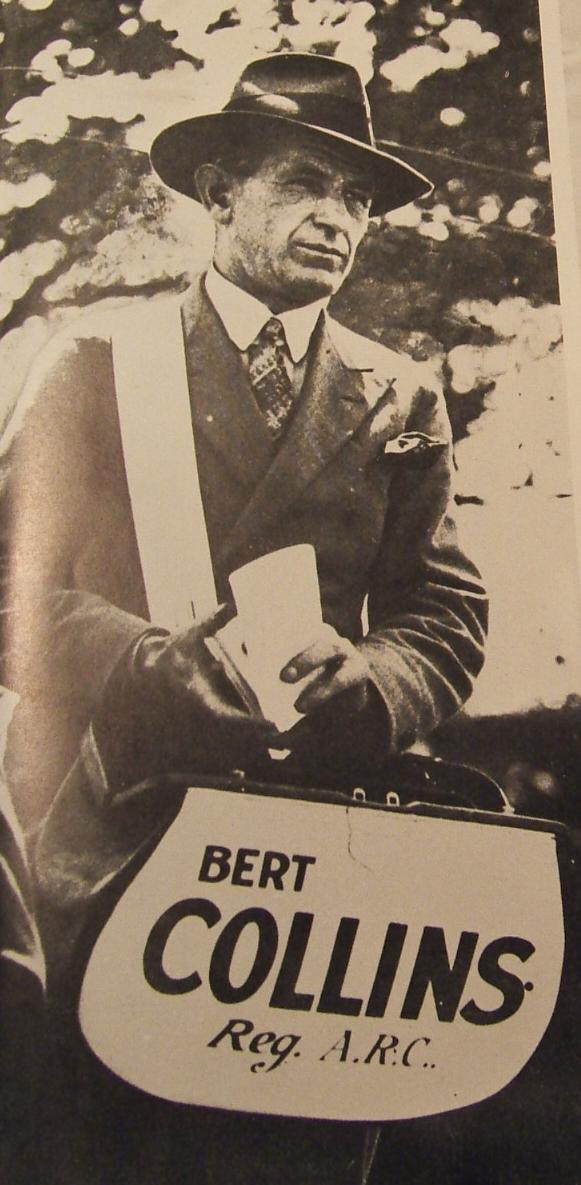
Collins working as a bookmaker

He turned his interest in gambling into a career, taking out a bookmaker's licence for a period and he served as a steward at pony races in Sydney. Neither role appealed to him as much as acting as a commission agent for other bookmakers. Collins would "lay-off" for bookmakers over-committed on certain horses, placing large bets carefully and with cool calculation. He won and lost two fortunes on the track and at one stage required the assistance of the New South Wales Cricketers Fund to support him and his invalid mother.

Collins re-enlisted in the Australian Army during the Second World War, stationed at Victoria Barracks with the rank of sergeant. In 1940, aged 51, he married 24-year-old Marjorie Paine, the daughter of a race steward. The marriage produced a son before ending in divorce eleven years later; a petition served by Collins was not defended by his wife. After his divorce, Collins continued to frequent gambling clubs at Kings Cross, participating in all-night poker sessions. Despite giving up smoking late in life, his lungs failed him and he died of cancer in 1959, aged 70. at the Prince Henry Hospital, Sydney. He was cremated.

== Playing style and personality ==
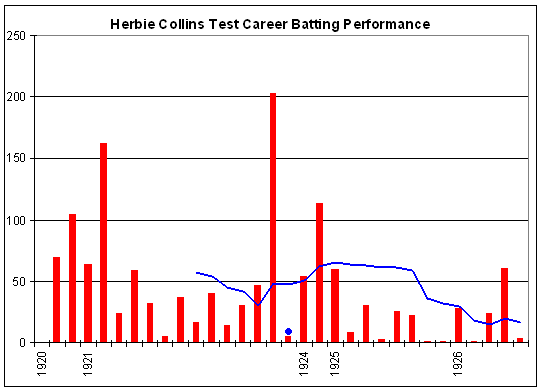
Graph of Collins' Test batting performance.

Collins was short, no more than 5 ft 8 in (173 cm) and slight. As a batsman, he was not an extravagant strokeplayer, preferring to avoid risk and leave balls on a good length where possible. He batted with very little backlift and at first inspection could seem strokeless, scoring only from pushes and prods, nudges and dabs. His patience was renowned, with the contemporary cricket writer Ray Robinson remarking "[Collins] had an implacable trench warfare style that in difficult times earned admiration from his own side, put bowlers on the road to exasperation and sent onlookers through the doors of bars." His one bold shot was an over-the-shoulder hook shot, finishing standing on his right foot, his left foot six inches in the air. As he was deficient in driving power, bowlers learnt to lessen his scoring power by pitching the ball well up. He often batted without the protection of gloves, especially on easy pitches.

Collins bowled his slow left arm spinners off two steps, with seemingly little effort. In South Africa while bowling, a batsman was heard to yell "Collins is getting weary, why don't you carry him to the wicket?" After his efforts for the AIF team he seldom bowled long spells again.

Popular with his men, Collins was respected for his faith in his teammates and his ability to relate to different personalities. The Test leg-spinner Arthur Mailey noted, "I learnt more of the psychology of cricket from Collins than from all the hundreds of cricketers I met." Bert Oldfield said of Collins, "He studied every player's temperament and acted accordingly." Collins was undemonstrative, expecting his fieldsmen to look at him after every delivery and adjust their position in response to his slight hand movements or even a bent finger. He was last to shower at the end of a day's play, preferring to sit in a corner in silence. His teammates assumed that he was contemplating the day's action and pondering on the next day's possibilities. He was a successful Test captain, leading Australia to five wins, two losses and four draws.

Many nicknames attached themselves to Collins, including "Lucky" and "Horseshoe" as a result of his reputation for fortune, especially when it came to tossing the coin. His players called him "Maudy" (probably because of his left-handedness) and "Nutty"; it is unclear if this was because he used his "nut" (head) or was a hard nut to crack. Mailey nicknamed him "The squirrel", claiming that Collins' eyes glowed at night, enabling him to see better at night than by day. Collins was a bohemian character who enjoyed all night poker and baccarat sessions and evenings at the opera. "Poker Face" was another of his nicknames. He had a light tenor voice and would sometimes sing at parties. While in the army, Collins became a chain smoker but he remained a teetotaller, save for an occasional glass of celebratory champagne.

| Preceded by Warwick Armstrong | Australian Test cricket captains 1921/22-1926 | Succeeded by Warren Bardsley |
