= History of Australian cricket from 1918–19 to 1930 =

This article describes the history of Australian cricket from the 1918–19 season until 1930.

Notable Australian players during this period include Warwick Armstrong, Charlie Macartney, Warren Bardsley, Jack Gregory, Ted McDonald, Arthur Mailey, Jack Ryder, Herbie Collins, Bert Oldfield, Clarrie Grimmett, Bill Woodfull, Bill Ponsford and the most famous Australian player of all time, Don Bradman, whose career began in the 1920s.

== Domestic cricket ==
=== Sheffield Shield winners ===
- 1919–20 – New South Wales
- 1920–21 – New South Wales
- 1921–22 – Victoria
- 1922–23 – New South Wales
- 1923–24 – Victoria
- 1924–25 – Victoria
- 1925–26 – New South Wales
- 1926–27 – South Australia
- 1927–28 – Victoria
- 1928–29 – New South Wales
- 1929–30 – Victoria

== International tours of Australia ==
=== England 1920–21 ===
- 1st Test at Sydney Cricket Ground – Australia won by 377 runs
- 2nd Test at Melbourne Cricket Ground – Australia won by an innings and 91 runs
- 3rd Test at Adelaide Oval – Australia won by 119 runs
- 4th Test at Melbourne Cricket Ground – Australia won by 8 wickets
- 5th Test at Sydney Cricket Ground – Australia won by 9 wickets

The Australian team was led by Warwick Armstrong in his first season as the captain of the Australian team. Other team members included Charlie Macartney, Herbie Collins, Warren Bardsley, Charles Kelleway, Jack Gregory, Johnny Taylor, Nip Pellew, Jack Ryder, Bert Oldfield, Ted McDonald and Arthur Mailey.

The England touring party included Johnny Douglas (captain), Jack Russell, Jack Hobbs, "Young" Jack Hearne, Patsy Hendren, Frank Woolley, Wilfred Rhodes, Bill Hitch, Abe Waddington, Cec Parkin and Bert Strudwick.

The tour was the first after the First World War to include Test matches, and it was the first Test series ever in which one side won all five matches. This feat was not repeated in an Ashes series until 2006–07.

=== MCC 1922–23 ===
An English cricket team raised by Marylebone Cricket Club (MCC) toured Australia and New Zealand in the winter of 1922–23 season. Seven first-class matches were played in Australia versus New South Wales (twice), South Australia (twice), Victoria (twice) and Western Australia (once).

The MCC team was captained by Archie MacLaren and included Tich Freeman, Freddie Calthorpe, Percy Chapman and Clement Gibson.

=== England 1924–25 ===
- 1st Test at Sydney Cricket Ground – Australia won by 195 runs
- 2nd Test at Melbourne Cricket Ground – Australia won by 81 runs
- 3rd Test at Adelaide Oval – Australia won by 11 runs
- 4th Test at Melbourne Cricket Ground – England won by an innings and 29 runs
- 5th Test at Sydney Cricket Ground – Australia won by 307 runs

=== New Zealand 1925–26 ===
The New Zealand national cricket team made its third tour of Australia in 1925–26 and played four first-class matches against each of the main Australian state teams.

New Zealand lost by an innings to Queensland in the opening match but then managed to draw the other three games against Victoria, South Australia and New South Wales.

=== New Zealand 1927–28 ===
The New Zealand team that toured England in the 1927 season played one first-class match against New South Wales in late October on their way back to New Zealand. After a fairly successful tour of England, and in the light of the Imperial Cricket Conference decision in 1926 to extend Test cricket to new teams outside the existing triumvirate of England, Australia and South Africa, the New Zealanders were keen for international experience.

The match in Sydney did not help their cause. New South Wales scored 571 at more than two runs a minute. Bill Merritt, the bowling star of the England tour, took five wickets in just over 23 overs, but they came at a cost of 218 runs. For the state side, Jack Gregory, Tommy Andrews, Alan Kippax and Archie Jackson all scored centuries. The New Zealanders scored 286 and 292 in reply, many batsmen getting a good start but no one exceeding Roger Blunt's first-innings 63. New South Wales needed eight to win and all the runs came in byes or leg-byes. The game was the first-class debut of Bill O'Reilly: he took three wickets.

=== England 1928–29 ===
- 1st Test at Brisbane Exhibition Ground – England won by 675 runs
- 2nd Test at Sydney Cricket Ground – England won by 8 wickets
- 3rd Test at Melbourne Cricket Ground – England won by 3 wickets
- 4th Test at Adelaide Oval – England won by 12 runs
- 5th Test at Melbourne Cricket Ground – Australia won by 5 wickets

=== MCC 1929–30 ===
The main purpose of this tour was a four-match Test series in New Zealand, but the England team began the tour in October 1929 in Australia where they played first-class matches versus each of New South Wales, Queensland, South Australia, Victoria and Western Australia.

The team was captained by Arthur Gilligan and included Frank Woolley, Duleep and Stan Nichols.

== External sources ==
- CricketArchive — itinerary of Australian cricket
