= Trenerry =

Trenerry is a surname. Notable people with the surname include:

- Bill Trenerry (1892–1975), Australian cricketer
- Ted Trenerry (1897–1983), Australian cricketer
