= 1914–15 Sheffield Shield season =

Australian cricket tournament

1914–15 Sheffield Shield
- Cricket format: First-class
- Tournament format: Double round-robin
- Champions: Victoria (7th title)
- Participants: 3
- Matches: 6
- Most runs: Jack Ryder (Victoria) – 425 runs
- Most wickets: Bert Ironmonger (Victoria) – 32 wickets

The 1914–15 Sheffield Shield season was the 23rd season of the Sheffield Shield, the domestic first-class cricket competition of Australia. Victoria won the championship after being awarded the title with a better average.

== Table ==
Team	Pld	W	L	D	Pts	Quot
Victoria	4	3	1	0	2	1.234
New South Wales	4	3	1	0	2	1.196
South Australia	4	0	4	0	-4	0.707

== Fixtures ==
18–22 December 1914
Scorecard

New South Wales	v	South Australia (H)
241 (76.1 overs); Johnny Taylor 69; Bill Stirling 3/52 (16 overs)		151 (51.4 overs); Nip Pellew 30; John Scott 4/20 (11 overs)
366 (108.3 overs); Bert Pratten 53; Edgar Mayne 2/34 (12 overs)		282 (73.3 overs); Donald Steele 100; Charlie Kelleway 3/47 (14 overs)

New South Wales won by 174 runs
Adelaide Oval, Adelaide
Umpires: A. T. Haddrick and F. J. C. Thomas

- New South Wales won the toss and elected to bat.

26–28 December 1914
Scorecard

(H) Victoria	v	New South Wales
142 (48.2 overs); Warwick Armstrong 62; Roy Minnett 8/50 (24.2 overs)		212 (74.4 overs); Warren Bardsley 34; Warwick Armstrong 5/34 (19.4 overs)
124 (40.2 overs); Jimmy Matthews 23; Charlie Kelleway 5/35 (16 overs)		4/58 (21.5 overs); Tommy Andrews 24; Bert Ironmonger 2/21 (10.5 overs)

New South Wales won by 6 wickets
Melbourne Cricket Ground, Melbourne
Umpires: Bob Crockett and E. J. Martin

- New South Wales won the toss and elected to field.

1–5 January 1915
Scorecard

(H) Victoria	v	South Australia
400 (115.2 overs); Fred Baring 80; Bill Whitty 2/112 (31.2 overs)		324 (113.4 overs); Donald Steele 85; Bert Ironmonger 6/112 (46.4 overs)
314 (97.5 overs); Roy Park 134; Albert Wright 4/53 (20 overs)		143 (68 overs); Edgar Mayne 68; Bert Ironmonger 7/69 (29 overs)

Victoria won by 247 runs
Melbourne Cricket Ground, Melbourne
Umpires: Bob Crockett and H. J. Alessio

- Victoria won the toss and elected to bat.

8–14 January 1915
Scorecard

(H) New South Wales	v	South Australia
307 (104.1 overs); Warren Bardsley 103; Bill Whitty 4/113 (37.1 overs)		215 (88.1 overs); Bill Stirling 43; Leslie Minnett 4/23 (18 overs)
255 (95.3 overs); Andrew Ratcliffe 59; Bill Whitty 6/103 (40 overs)		331 (128.4 overs); Nip Pellew 97; Tommy Andrews 3/33 (16 overs)

New South Wales won by 16 runs
Sydney Cricket Ground, Sydney
Umpires: Alfred Jones and William Curran

- New South Wales won the toss and elected to bat.

23–27 January 1915
Scorecard

Victoria	v	New South Wales (H)
240 (107 overs); Jack Ryder 55; Arthur Mailey 6/62 (20 overs)		199 (83 overs); Charlie Kelleway 43*; Ted McDonald 3/59 (22 overs)
188 (88.5 overs); Jack Ryder 93*; Tommy Andrews 4/45 (21.5 overs)		213 (114.5 overs); Warren Bardsley 59*; Bert Ironmonger 6/73 (48 overs)

Victoria won by 16 runs
Sydney Cricket Ground, Sydney
Umpires: R. M. Wallace and Walter French

- Victoria won the toss and elected to bat.

19–22 February 1915
Scorecard

(H) South Australia	v	Victoria
143 (52.1 overs); Bill Stirling 42; Bert Ironmonger 4/41 (20 overs)		379 (132 overs); Jack Ryder 151; Bill Whitty 3/80 (40 overs)
258 (93.4 overs); Johnny Moyes 61; Ted McDonald 4/68 (23.4 overs)		0/23 (5.3 overs); Roy Park 12*

Victoria won by 10 wickets
Adelaide Oval, Adelaide
Umpires: A. McIntyre and A. W. Hele

- South Australia won the toss and elected to bat.

== Statistics ==
=== Most Runs ===
Jack Ryder 425

=== Most Wickets ===
Bert Ironmonger 32
