= International cricket in 1919 =

International cricket season

The 1919 International cricket season was from April 1919 to August 1919. The season consisted of the English domestic season and the Australian Imperial Forces tour in England.
