= 1919 English cricket season =

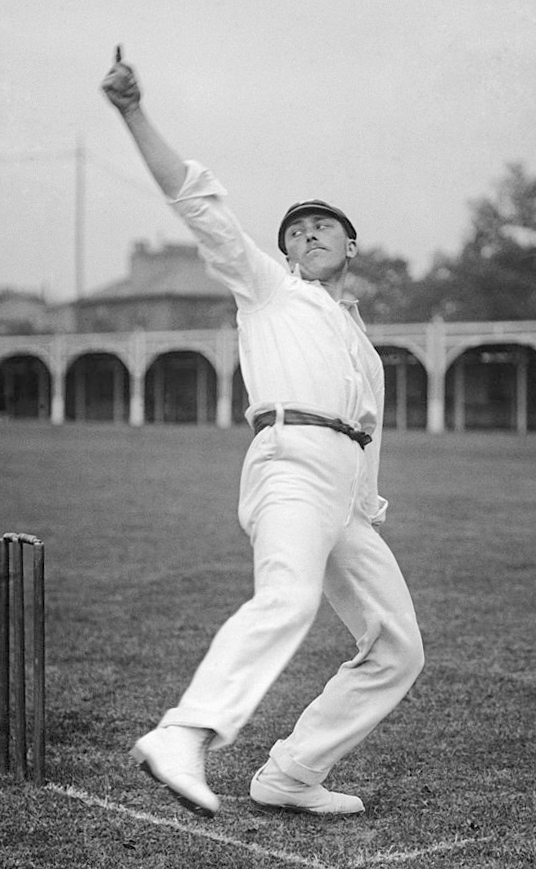
Wilfred Rhodes was the leading wicket-taker in 1919, claiming 164 wickets.

1919 was the 26th season of County Championship cricket in England and the first since 1914. The authorities had doubted if cricket would remain popular after a four-year break and the strain of war. It was decided that County Championship matches should be reduced from three days' duration to two, but cricket had not lost its popularity and the two-day experiment was a failure. Yorkshire finished the season as champions, topping the table by four percentage points. No Test cricket was played but an Australian Imperial Forces team toured England, playing matches from mid-May until mid-September. Andy Ducat, Patsy Hendren, Percy Holmes, Herbert Sutcliffe and Ernest Tyldesley were named in the 1920 edition of Wisden Cricketers' Almanack as the Five Cricketers of the Year for their 1919 performances.

== Honours ==
- County Championship – Yorkshire
- Wisden (Five Batsmen of the Year) – Andy Ducat, Patsy Hendren, Percy Holmes, Herbert Sutcliffe, Ernest Tyldesley

== County Championship ==
1919 County Championship
- Cricket format: First-class cricket (2 days)
- Tournament format: League system
- Champions: Yorkshire (10th title)
- Participants: 15
- Matches: 124
- Most runs: Harry Makepeace (1,747 for Lancashire)
- Most wickets: Wilfred Rhodes (142 for Yorkshire)

The 1919 tournament was hurriedly arranged in the aftermath of the Armistice of 11 November 1918. A key meeting of the county clubs took place at Lord's on Wednesday, 5 February. Fearing that cricket might have lost its popularity since 1914, they decided by a consensus of eleven against five to restrict matches to a two-day duration instead of three, but with longer hours of play. Wisden editor Sydney Pardon led the chorus of disapproval, saying: "I have a very strong opinion that a grave mistake has been made in not letting the game alone. The restriction of all county matches to two days strikes me as being a sad blunder". Pardon went on to suggest that the County Championship should be "dropped entirely for one year" to allow a reasonable period for post-war recovery.

The sixteen clubs had to arrange their own fixtures at quite short notice and this was done with variable success. Yorkshire played 26 matches and Lancashire 24 but, at the other extreme, Northamptonshire and Somerset played only twelve apiece while Worcestershire decided not to compete at all. The February meeting had decided to order the tournament on the basis of "percentage of wins to matches played" but, with the disparity in matches played, the final table could easily have presented a false picture. As it was, Yorkshire were awarded the title after winning twelve of their twenty-six matches for a percentage of 46.15%. They were closely followed by Kent, who had 42.85%. Kent, however, played only fourteen matches and, on the final day of the season, they were within one wicket (in a drawn match) of taking the title. Roy Webber said it was "just" that Yorkshire finished top given the number of matches played by each county. Nottinghamshire were third with 35.71% (five wins from fourteen) and Warwickshire were bottom with 7.14% (one win from fourteen).

The 1919 County Championship was the 26th since the competition acquired official status in 1890. The opening matches began on Friday, 16 May. These were Middlesex v Nottinghamshire at Lord's and the 1914 (reigning) champions Surrey against Somerset at The Oval. The final match between Essex and Surrey at Leyton was completed on Monday, 1 September.

The situation between Yorkshire and Kent on Saturday, 30 August (the second day in both of their final games), was that three title outcomes were possible: if both won they would share the title; if one won and the other did not then the winning team would be champions; if neither won then Yorkshire would be champions. Yorkshire were playing Sussex at Hove and there had been a first day washout so there was little hope of a result with only one day's play possible and the match was drawn. This meant that a win for Kent over Middlesex at Lord's would give them the title. Some play was possible on the first day and Kent were 97 for one overnight in their first innings, having won the toss and decided to bat. They reached 196 and then bowled Middlesex out for 87, forcing them to follow on. Thanks, however, to stubborn resistance by Patsy Hendren and Frank Mann, Middlesex were a tougher nut to crack in their second innings and they held on for the draw. At the close, Middlesex were just twelve runs ahead with one wicket standing.

The final table was as follows. There was no points system and placings were determined by the percentage of wins to matches played.

Team	P	W	L	D	%
Yorkshire	26	12	3	11	46.15
Kent	14	6	1	7	42.85
Nottinghamshire	14	5	1	8	35.71
Surrey	20	7	3	10	35.00
Lancashire	24	8	4	12	33.33
Somerset	12	4	3	4	33.33
Hampshire	16	5	4	7	31.25
Gloucestershire	16	4	7	5	25.00
Derbyshire	14	3	9	2	21.42
Leicestershire	14	3	4	7	21.42
Sussex	20	4	11	4	20.00
Northamptonshire	12	2	4	6	16.66
Middlesex	14	2	3	9	14.28
Essex	18	2	4	12	11.11
Warwickshire	14	1	7	6	7.14
Somerset v Sussex at Taunton was tied, but recorded as a draw. Source: Roy Webber

The two-day experiment failed because, given good weather and batting conditions, the majority of matches could not be completed and were drawn. Pardon and his supporters were proved right and, in an Advisory County Committee meeting at Lord's on Monday, 8 December, the main decision taken was to restore the three-day format for the 1920 championship.

In his 1919 editorial, Pardon also complained about a plethora of ideas for reform that were appearing in the newspapers. He argued: "So far as I know the game was flourishing, when in August 1914 the world was suddenly turned upside down. Be this as it may, the resumption of first-class matches was no sooner announced than all the faddists in Great Britain began to fill the newspapers with their ideas of what they were pleased to call reform or reconstruction". Some of the suggestions were dismissed by Pardon as "preposterous" but others needed to be taken more seriously, such as one being supported by Stanley Jackson to shorten the boundaries. All except the two-day match were rejected.

== Australian Imperial Forces tour ==
The Australian Imperial Forces cricket team played twenty-eight first-class matches in England from mid-May until mid-September. Mostly, they played against county teams, but they also met some representative teams such as the South, H. K. Foster's XI and the Gentlemen. Of their twenty-eight matches, the touring team won twelve and lost four; the other twelve (mostly two-day matches) were drawn. Four of the Australian Imperial Forces team passed 1,000 runs during their tour, led by Carl Willis, who accrued 1,652 runs at an average of 41.30. Jack Gregory was the leading wicket-taker for the tourists, claiming 131 wickets.

== Statistical leaders ==
Jack Hobbs was the leading run-scorer in first-class cricket during the season, amassing 2,594 runs at an average of 60.32 during 30 matches for Surrey and the Players. He was the only batsman to exceed 2,000 runs in the year, and was one of 31 to score 1,000 runs or more. Two of those, George Gunn and Patsy Hendren finished the year with a superior batting average to Hobbs; Gunn scored his 1,451 runs at 63.08, while Hendren's 1,655 runs came at 61.29.

Ten bowlers took 100 or more wickets during 1919, led by Wilfred Rhodes, who claimed 164. Among those who took 100 wickets, Rhodes also had the best bowling average, claiming his wickets at 14.42. He was trailed in this statistic by Jack White, who took 128 wickets at 14.94, though Bill Hitch, Johnny Douglas and Jack Gregory all took more wickets than White.

== Bibliography ==
- Webber, Roy (1958). The County Cricket Championship. Sportsman's Book Club.
