= Australian Imperial Force Touring XI =

1919–1920 cricket team

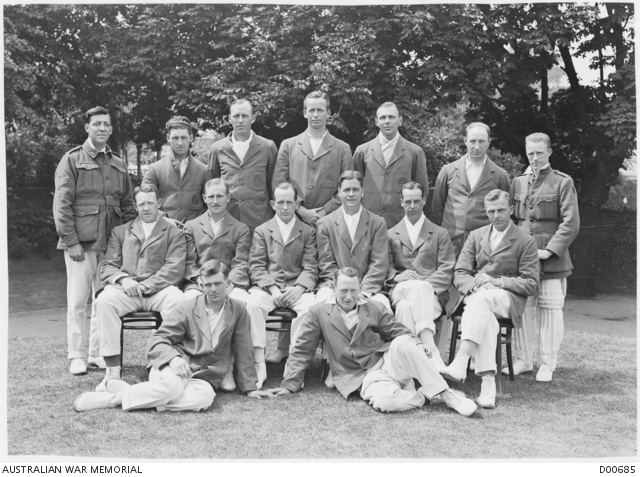
The Australian Imperial Force Touring XI photographed at Lord's Cricket Ground in June 1919. Back row (L to R): Staff Sergeant C. S. Winning, Dental Section, AIF Headquarters (HQ); Sergeant H. S. Love, Australian Army Service Corps (AASC); Gunner J. T. Murray, 103rd Battery; Gunner E. Bull, 26th Battery; Lieutenant J. M. Gregory, 4th Divisional Artillery; Captain E. J. Long, Deputy Assistant Provost Marshal, Weymouth; Corporal W. A. S. Oldfield, 15th Brigade (Field Ambulance). Middle row: Major C. T. Docker, General List; Captain C. E. Pellew, 27th Battalion; Lance Corporal H. L. Collins, 10th AASC; Captain C. B. Willis, Dental Section; Sergeant A. W. Lampard, 10th AASC; Captain W. L. Trennery, 17th Battalion. Front row: Gunner J. M. Taylor, 101st Howitzer Battery; Warrant Officer W. S. Stirling, AIF Headquarters, Records Section. Most players are wearing the official team blazer with the AIF "rising sun" emblem on the pocket.

When the First World War ended in November 1918, thousands of Australian servicemen were in Europe as members of the First Australian Imperial Force (AIF), and many remained until the spring of 1919. In England, a new first-class cricket season was planned, the first since 1914, and an idea that came to fruition was the formation of an Australian touring side made up of servicemen. Agreement was reached with the Australian Corps HQ in London, commanded by General William Birdwood, 1st Baron Birdwood, and the Australian Imperial Force Touring XI was formed, initially under the captaincy of pre-war Test player Charlie Kelleway. Kelleway departed after only six matches, following a dispute about the fixtures list.

A players' meeting elected future Test player Herbie Collins as team captain for the remainder of the tour, despite the fact that Collins' military rank was lance corporal, and there were seven officers in the party. The bulk of the team remained intact for nearly nine months from May 1919, playing 33 matches in Great Britain, ten in South Africa on their way home, and then another three in Australia itself before disbanding in February 1920. Of the 46 matches, 39 are adjudged first-class, and the team had only four defeats, all of these in England. The players lived on their army pay, and all profits from gate money went to an AIF Sports Control Board. The team toured Great Britain May to September 1919, playing 28 first-class matches with twelve wins, four defeats and twelve draws. Five minor matches were also played, three of these in Scotland, the Australians winning two and drawing three.

The AIF team toured South Africa October to December on their way home, and were undefeated in ten matches, eight of which were first-class. Two unofficial "Tests" were played at the Old Wanderers stadium in Johannesburg, Australia winning both comfortably. Jack Gregory relished the conditions in South Africa while the local newspapers acclaimed Collins as the finest player in the team. On arrival home January 1920 in Australia, the team played three first-class matches, defeating both the reigning Sheffield Shield champions New South Wales, and their main challengers Victoria. A likely victory against Queensland was frustrated by torrential rain. The results in Australia demonstrated the strength of the AIF team. Within a few months of the team's dissolution, five players would make their Test débuts: batsmen Collins, Johnny Taylor, and Nip Pellew; wicket-keeper Bert Oldfield; and fast bowling all-rounder Gregory.

== Preliminaries ==
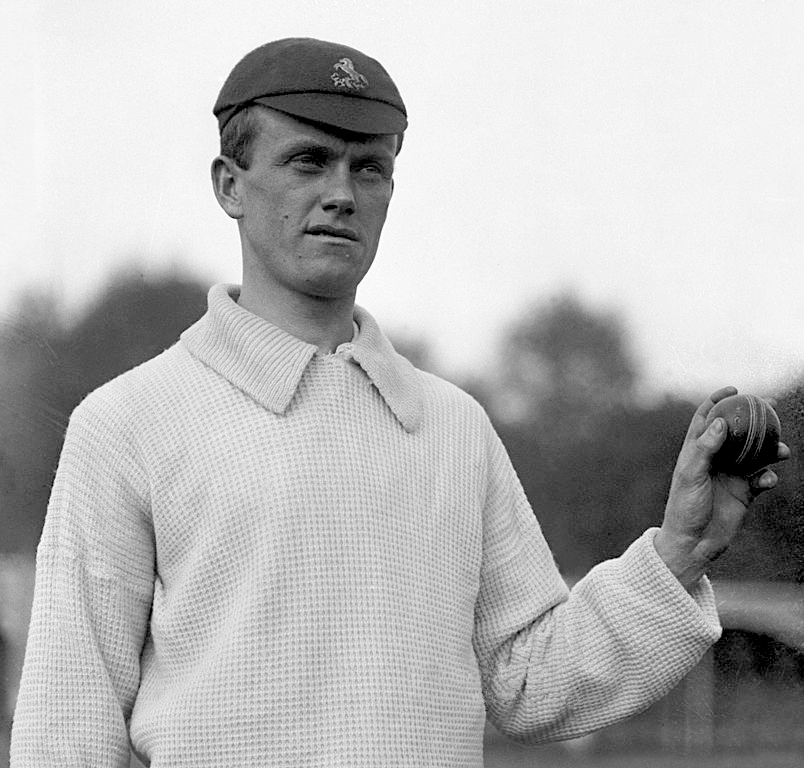
Colin Blythe's final match was against an AIF XI

During 1917 and 1918, at the height of the First World War, charity matches were occasionally staged between teams of servicemen, including many players of first-class standard. On 14 July 1917, there was a one-day match at Lord's between teams representing the British Army and the First Australian Imperial Force. It was played in aid of St Dunstan's Hostel for Blinded Sailors and Soldiers. The AIF scored 130 and the Army were all out for 162 just before the match ended in a draw. The game, a great success, featured notable players, including Colin Blythe in his final match, Patsy Hendren, Pelham Warner, and Percy Fender for the British Army. The Australian team included Charlie Kelleway, Charlie Macartney, Cyril Docker, and Bill Stirling. It was the first match involving a team representative of the AIF. The match was later summarised in the Sydney newspaper, The Referee. In August, an Australian Services XI played against an Indian Gymkhana XI at Lord's. Later in the month, a combined Australian and South African XI played a British Army and Royal Navy team, also at Lord's, both matches to raise money for wartime charities.

There were a couple of games involving Australian XIs in 1918, but the main events were three matches played at Lord's and The Oval between an England XI and a Dominions XI which included a number of Australian players such as Kelleway, Docker, Nip Pellew, Johnny Taylor, Ed Long, and Allie Lampard who were all to play for the AIF team in 1919. All three games were of one-day duration, and all were drawn.

Following the cessation of hostilities on 11 November 1918, the Australian Army Corps HQ in London had to think of ways to entertain the thousands of servicemen waiting to be sent home. An AIF Sports Control Board was formed and, notice having been taken of the success of the wartime charity matches, issued 31 January 1919 an AIF Order 1539 to all ranks:

The following proposals for the formation of an AIF Board of Control to encourage sport in all units and supervise organisation and selection of representative teams. The Board to consist of a president, two representatives from units in France, one from AIF depots in the United Kingdom, one from London, and one representative of the Australian Comforts Fund.

The AIF Sports Control Board was fully supported by the Australian Board of (Cricket) Control which appointed Major Gordon Campbell, the former South Australia wicketkeeper, as its representative in meetings about a proposed AIF team and tour. The Board of Control retained control of the team, and awarded first-class status to most of its matches, but much of the practical organisation, especially of fixtures, was undertaken by Surrey County Cricket Club, and their representative Howard Lacey became the team manager. Lacey had organised a charity match in August 1918 between his own invitation XI and an Australian XI. The Sports Board began trials in February 1919, and there was an enthusiastic response from many servicemen with first-class or grade cricket experience. Despite the fact that some of the players still carried war injuries, the Sports Board was able to form a strong team which came to be billed as the Australian Imperial Force Touring XI.

Given the large number of applicants, the AIF formed a second eleven which toured the minor cricket circuit in England, playing against league clubs, county club colts, and public schools teams. The second eleven played 55 matches, and lost only eleven, but few of its members ever played more than first-grade club cricket when they returned to Australia.

== Players ==
The table below lists all seventeen players who represented the AIF Touring XI in at least one first-class match. Details state the player's military rank, Sheffield Shield state team, date of birth, age on 14 May 1919 when the first match began, batting hand, and bowling type:

Batsmen
Name	Military rank and unit	State team	Birth date	Batting hand	Bowling style	Ref
E. A. Bull	Gunner, 26th Field Battery	New South Wales	28 September 1886 (aged 32)	right	right arm medium pace and leg break	
J. T. Murray	Gunner, 103rd Howitzer Battery	South Australia	1 December 1892 (aged 26)	right	right arm medium pace	
C. E. Pellew	Captain, 27th Battalion	South Australia	21 September 1893 (aged 25)	right	right arm medium pace	
J. M. Taylor	Gunner, 101st Howitzer Battery	New South Wales	10 October 1895 (aged 23)	right	unrecorded	
W. L. Trenerry	Captain, 17th Battalion	New South Wales	29 November 1892 (aged 26)	right	right arm leg break	
C. B. Willis	Captain, Dental Section	Victoria	23 March 1893 (aged 26)	right	unrecorded	

All-rounders
Name	Military rank and unit	State team	Birth date	Batting hand	Bowling style	Ref
H. L. Collins	Lance corporal, 10th Australian Army Service Corps	New South Wales	21 January 1888 (aged 31)	right	slow left arm spin	
J. M. Gregory	Lieutenant, 4th Divisional Artillery	New South Wales	14 August 1895 (aged 23)	left	right-arm fast	
C. Kelleway	Captain, division tbc	New South Wales	25 April 1886 (aged 33)	right	right arm fast-medium pace	
A. W. Lampard	Sergeant, 10th Australian Army Service Corps	Victoria	3 July 1885 (aged 33)	right	leg break and googly	

Wicketkeepers
Name	Military rank and unit	State team	Birth date	Batting hand	Bowling style	Ref
E. J. Long	Captain, Provost Corps	New South Wales	28 March 1883 (aged 36)	right	none	
H. S. B. Love	Sergeant, 10th Australian Army Service Corps	New South Wales	10 August 1895 (aged 23)	right	none	
W. A. S. Oldfield	Corporal, 15th Brigade (Field Ambulance)	New South Wales	9 September 1894 (aged 24)	right	none	

Bowlers
Name	Military rank and unit	State team	Birth date	Batting hand	Bowling style	Ref
C. T. Docker	Major, General List	New South Wales	3 March 1884 (aged 35)	right	right arm fast-medium pace	
H. F. T. Heath	Chaplain	South Australia	19 December 1885 (aged 33)	left	left arm slow medium pace	
W. S. Stirling	Warrant officer, AIF (1st) HQ, Records	South Australia	19 March 1891 (aged 28)	right	left arm medium pace	
C. S. Winning	Staff Sergeant, Dental Section, AIF (1st) HQ	none	20 April 1889 (aged 30)	right	right arm medium pace	

== Tour of England ==
=== 14 May to 3 June ===
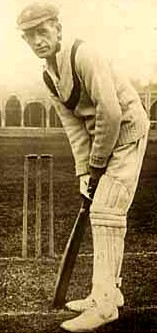
Herbie Collins

The tour opened on 14 May with, curiously, a twelve-a-side match that is nevertheless adjudged first-class. The opposition was L. G. Robinson's XII, an invitation team organised by the cricket-loving businessman Lionel Robinson. It was played 14 to 16 May at the Old Buckenham Hall Cricket Ground in Attleborough, Norfolk, and ended in a draw though all four results were possible in the closing overs. Robinson's team scored 147 and 362 for eight declared, a match total of 509. In reply, the AIF scored 227 and were 274 for nine when time ran out, a match total of 501 leaving them nine runs and Robinson's team one wicket short of victory. The Australian team included the future New South Wales and Australian Test wicketkeeper Hammy Love in this match. It was his first-class debut but his sole appearance for the AIF. Also making first-class debuts here were Jack Gregory and Bill Trenerry for the AIF and the Kent batsman Jack Bryan.

The AIF played many of its first-class matches in England over three days although the County Championship that year consisted (for the only time ever as it was a singularly unsuccessful venture) of two-day matches. AIF's first match against a county team started on 17 May at the County Ground, Leyton, against Essex and skipper Charlie Kelleway with 126 made the team's first century. Gregory with seven wickets in the match gave notice of his potential. AIF won inside two days by an innings and 114 runs against a team led by England captain Johnny Douglas who could only contribute 0 and 14.

Two of the next three matches were against the principal University teams. The AIF played Cambridge University at Fenner's 21 to 23 May and then Oxford University at The Parks 29 to 30 May. Cambridge were thrashed by an innings and 239 runs following centuries by Kelleway and Nip Pellew. Gregory took six for 65 in the first innings and Allie Lampard and Cyril Docker bowled Cambridge out in the second. The Oxford match was scheduled for two days and, like so many of the two-day County Championship fixtures that season, was drawn. Kelleway took seven for 47 in the first innings and there were centuries by Jack Murray and Johnny Taylor. The AIF team at Oxford included Harry Heath who made his first-class debut there but did not play for AIF again. Heath made two first-class appearances for South Australia in 1923–24. Also making his first-class debut at Oxford was future Australian Test keeper Bert Oldfield.

In between the university matches, the AIF made the first of three visits to Lord's Cricket Ground (Lord's) where they played Middlesex 26 to 28 May. The AIF had arguably the best of a keenly fought draw. Herbie Collins made his first century of the tour with 127 and 64. Lampard bowled well and took six for 91 in the Middlesex first innings but it included a fourth wicket partnership of 177 between Patsy Hendren and Pelham Warner who both completed centuries.

The final match starting May was against Surrey at The Oval 31 May to 3 June and it was another draw. Jack Hobbs, known as "The Master", was in brilliant form and scored 205* out of only 344 to give Surrey first innings lead. The AIF built a massive 554 for seven declared in their second innings with centuries by Lampard and Pellew and 96 by Taylor. This set Surrey 441 to win, an impossible target in the time remaining, and Surrey held on for the draw with 128 for five after Hobbs that time was out for seven.

During or immediately following the Surrey match, there was a dispute in the AIF team "about the fixtures list" and a players' meeting was held at The Oval which elected Collins as team captain in place of Kelleway, who did not play for the AIF again. The team was still a military one and cricket writer Ray Robinson expressed surprise at Collins' election as he was a lance corporal being asked to lead a team largely comprising officers including one major (Cyril Docker) and four captains. Chris Harte wrote that the team "ignored all considerations of (military) rank", Collins "giving orders to seven commissioned officers without anyone questioning his authority". According to Harte, Kelleway was "relieved of the captaincy following a decision by the Army authorities because of (his) poor behaviour", this echoing the problems of the Australian team to England in 1912, of which Kelleway was a member.

With Kelleway's departure, the AIF squad was reduced to its nucleus of fourteen principal members: Herbie Collins (captain), Eric Bull, Cyril Docker, Jack Gregory, Allie Lampard, Ed Long, Jack Murray, Bert Oldfield, Nip Pellew, Bill Stirling, Johnny Taylor, Bill Trenerry, Carl Willis and Charles Winning. Their success was being noticed outside England and in due course the AIF Sports Control Board received a telegram from the South African government in Pretoria asking if the team could tour South Africa en route to Australia. The players held a meeting and were unanimous in their refusal as they wanted to go straight home once their tour of England was completed. However, the Australian Army thought differently and the Ministry of Defence ordered them, as serving officers and other ranks, to comply. Planning began for a tour of South Africa from October to December.

=== 5 to 28 June ===
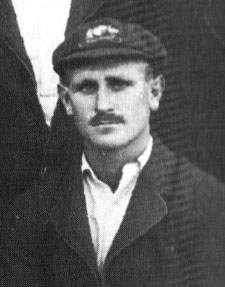
Nip Pellew

Collins' first game in charge was at Lord's against Marylebone Cricket Club (MCC) and the Australians won convincingly by ten wickets inside two days on 5 and 6 June. Gregory, Lampard and Stirling shared 18 wickets in the match as MCC were dismissed for 133 and 228, the Australians replying with 297 and 66 for no wicket. Gregory with 56 top-scored and Trenerry scored 55, these two adding 80 for the eighth wicket after the Australians had struggled to 164 for seven. Charles Winning made his first-class debut in the match for the AIF.

The game against Sussex at the County Cricket Ground, Hove on 9 and 10 June was scheduled for two days only and was drawn. Sussex scored 227 and 241 with Collins taking five for 45 and three for 41. The Australians replied with 289 and 77 for eight, just holding on for the draw at the end after the second innings nearly succumbed to the Sussex seam attack. If a third day had been scheduled, this almost certainly would have been the first AIF defeat.

On 11 June, the team took the train north for matches against two of the strongest county sides, Lancashire and Yorkshire. They played Lancashire at Old Trafford in Manchester 12 to 14 June and Yorkshire at Bramall Lane in Sheffield 16 to 18 June. The Australians won both matches, comprehensively defeating Lancashire by an innings and 157 runs but only by one wicket against Yorkshire after a dramatic finale. At Old Trafford, Collins won the toss, decided to bat and led the way from the first ball with 103. Trenerry scored a career-highest 82 and the Australians batted into the second day to total a commanding 418. Lancashire collapsed twice with 125 and 136, the match ending same day. Stirling took five for 38 in the first innings and then Lampard produced the remarkable figures of nine for 42 in the second.

The match in Sheffield produced an exciting finish as the Australians, needing 170 to win, had been reduced to 116 for nine before Gregory was joined by last man Ed Long. Against the odds, they put on 54 for the tenth wicket to win the game, Gregory scoring 41* and Long 13*. Yorkshire, featuring George Hirst and Wilfred Rhodes, went on to win the County Championship in 1919 so this was an outstanding performance by Collins' team. Yorkshire won the toss and batted first. Their opening pair of Rhodes (90) and Percy Holmes (71) shared 150 for the first wicket but finally Gregory dismissed Holmes and then, with six for 91, proceeded to bowl Yorkshire out for 224. The Australians began badly and were 59 for four before the middle order rallied and eventually reached 265 on the second day. A key innings was played by one of the bit-part players Eric Bull who scored a career-highest 42 at a crucial time from the end of day one and well into the second morning. Yorkshire scored 210 in their second innings and would have had a very low score but for an outstanding effort by Hirst with 88. Yorkshire again struggled against Gregory who dismissed all the first six batsmen and finished with seven for 79, a match haul of thirteen for 170. The Australians began the fourth innings before lunch on the final day and were soon struggling after Collins was out without scoring and only Trenerry, with 39, made any contribution among the top order batsmen. The total was 71 for five when Bull came in and he played another valuable innings of 27 until he was out at 111 for eight. Gregory was joined by Winning who was out for nought at 116 for nine and this set up the remarkable climax to the game between Gregory and Long.

The Australians travelled south again on 19 June, taking the trains from Sheffield to Southampton where they played Hampshire in a two-day match 20 and 21 June on the County Ground, Southampton. This match was rain-affected and the short schedule left no time to make up for stoppages so it was an inevitable draw after Hampshire scored 191 and 67 for one, and the Australians scored 136. The Australian batsmen struggled in the conditions against the seam bowling of Alec Kennedy.

Having been unbeaten in their first eleven matches, the Australians finally tasted defeat in the twelfth at Lord's when they played the Gentlemen of England, captained by Pelham Warner, 23 to 25 June. The Gentlemen batted first after winning the toss and ran up a total of 402, batting into the second morning. Surprisingly, the Australians collapsed against the fast-medium pace of Johnny Douglas (four for 34) and Michael Falcon (six for 41) and were bowled out for only 85 in the 35th over. Asked to follow on, the Australians reached 149 for 8 at close of play but were dismissed for 184 in the third morning. Douglas took four for forty this time and the slow left armer Jack White took four for 38. The result was a comprehensive victory for the Gentlemen by an innings and 133 runs.

The Australians recovered to win the next match at the County Ground, Northampton, defeating Northamptonshire (Northants) by 196 runs in a three-day match 26 to 28 June. The AIF won the toss and batted first. Gregory opened the innings with Taylor and scored 115 in just two and a half hours, AIF totalling 297. Northants reached a creditable 109 for two at the close and were then all out for 246 next day, Gregory taking four for 71. The Australians reached 177 for six at close of play on the second day and went on to total 314, Trenerry with 58 the top score. Collins with five for 26 and Gregory with four for 74 bowled out Northants for 169. It was an outstanding all-round performance by Gregory, whose 115 was his maiden first-class century. He scored 49 in the second innings and held three catches in the match in addition to his eight wickets.

=== 30 June to 8 July ===
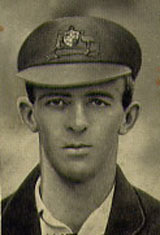
Johnny Taylor

The Australians played four second-class matches in this period, all of them scheduled for two days only. Three were in Scotland and one against Durham which was then a Minor Counties team. They defeated a West of Scotland team in Glasgow by an innings and 560 runs after scoring 733 for six declared with four centuries. Then they played two matches, one in Edinburgh and one in Glasgow, against the Scotland national team. These were both impacted by the weather and drawn. The game against Durham was played in West Hartlepool and also drawn.

=== 11 July to 2 August ===
The Australians returned to first-class action on 11 July in a two-day match at Grace Road, Leicester that was drawn. The AIF opened with 551 for five declared (Pellew 187, Willis 156* and Collins 121) which was their total at the end of the first day. Leicestershire with 224 and 28 for no wicket held on through the second day. The match was another example of the folly of trying to play first-class cricket over two days only. However, the next one was also a two-day affair and Derbyshire defeated the AIF by 36 runs at the County Ground, Derby. It was a low-scoring game with Derbyshire scoring 181 and 112 while the Australians could only muster 125 and 132 in reply. Derbyshire paceman James Horsley did the damage, taking six for 55 and six for 62.

There was a two-day draw at the Racecourse Ground, Hereford against Harry Foster's XI and then the AIF defeated Foster's Worcestershire at New Road, Worcester by an innings and 203 runs. Worcestershire did not take part in the County Championship in 1919. Gregory took eleven wickets in the match including his best innings analysis to date of seven for 56. The AIF innings totalled 450 for four declared, featuring an unbroken fifth wicket stand of 300 between Pellew (195*) and Willis (129*). In another two-day affair, Warwickshire were beaten by an innings and 38 runs at Edgbaston after Collins scored 110 and took five for 73.

The Australians must have been pleased to play Nottinghamshire (Notts) over three days at Trent Bridge but the match was drawn. They batted first and made 371 featuring another fine innings by Willis with 130, but Notts and George Gunn trumped them with 391 and 131 respectively, batting into the third morning. Collins scored 118 and declared the second innings at 242 for five but this only left time for 25 overs and Notts played out to 62 for one. Collins completed his 1,000 runs for the season in this match.

Following a short break, the Australians played Surrey at The Oval 31 July to 2 August and drew. The AIF batted first and scored 436 with Collins top scorer on 95. They had Surrey on 83 for six in the second morning but the county rallied with a seventh wicket partnership of 146 between captain Cyril Wilkinson (103) and Jack Crawford (144*) to reach 322 and avoid the follow-on. The AIF made 260 for four declared and Surrey secured the draw with 121 for one (Jack Hobbs 68*).

=== 4 to 30 August ===
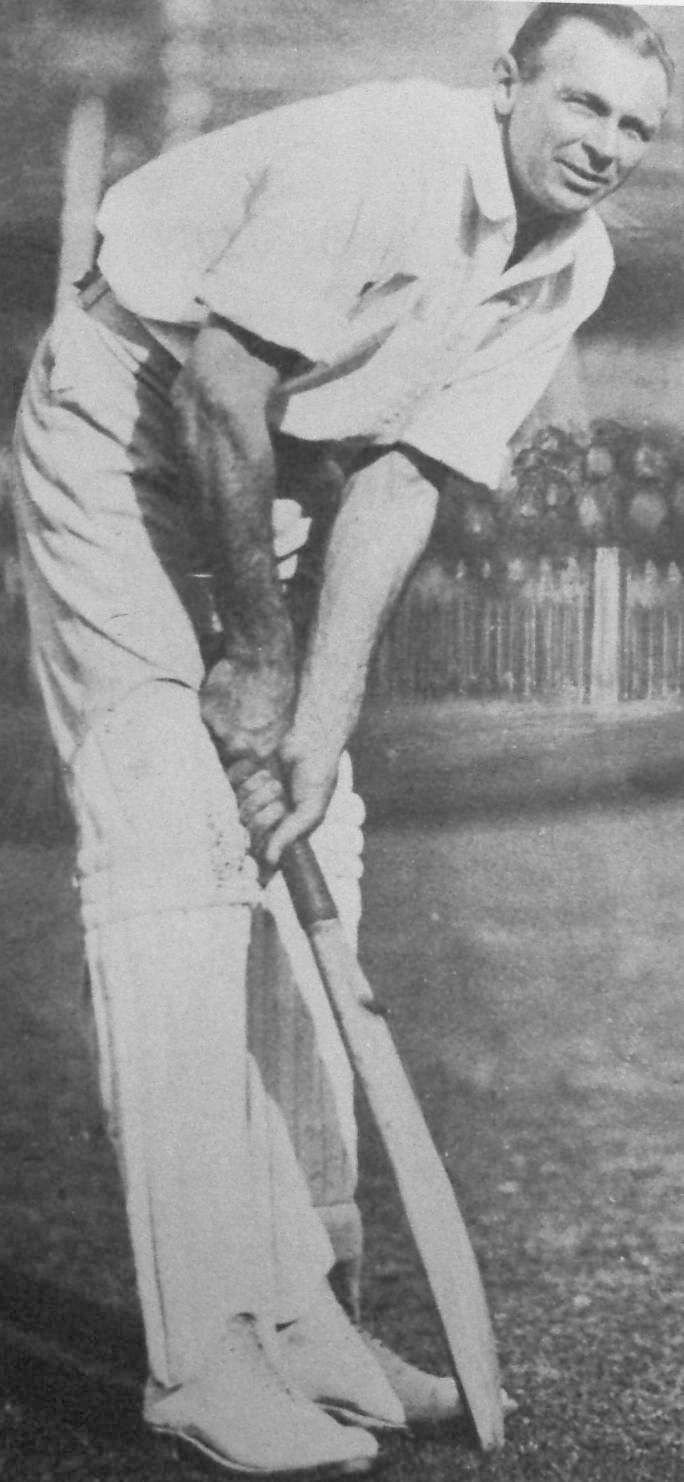
Jack Gregory

The Australians won their first match starting in August by an innings and 54 runs. This was another two-day affair but Sussex collapsed twice at the County Ground in Hove to provide the AIF with a straightforward victory after they scored 300 against 120 and 126. Carl Willis, enjoying something of a purple patch in the summer months, scored another century with 127, opening the innings this time and Sussex needed a run out to dismiss him. The next highest Australian score was 31. In the Sussex first innings, Gregory took six for 38 and Collins four for 47. In the second innings, it was Collins with six for 27 (ten for 65 in the match) who dismissed Sussex.

Next up were Kent at the St Lawrence Ground in Canterbury and, although this was a three-day match 7 to 9 August, it was drawn. AIF won the toss and batted first to reach only 198 with Kent making 142 for six at close of play on the first day. Gregory, who opened with Collins, had the top AIF score of 67. Kent's great all-rounder Frank Woolley took four for 37. Woolley got a duck when Kent batted but the team totalled 301 to establish a first innings lead of 103. Gregory took seven for 100. At close of play on day two, the AIF had taken the lead and were 275 for four with Willis on 78 and Stirling on 50. Pellew had earlier scored 91. Willis missed out on another century when he was caught behind off Tich Freeman for 95. Stirling made 62* and Collins declared on 419 for eight, leaving Kent to make 317 with enough time for 64 overs. This time, Woolley held his side together with 76 and they were 172 for five at the close.

The AIF took a break at this point with no matches between Monday, 10 and Wednesday, 20 August inclusive. They returned to action on Thursday, 21 August at Southchurch Park in Southend, playing Essex until Saturday, 23 August. Johnny Douglas won the toss and put the AIF in to bat. It looked a good decision as he took seven for 50 himself with his fast-medium pace and the Australians were all out for only 130. Essex were 101 for six at the close and reached 151 on the second morning, Gregory and Collins again bowling in tandem and taking four apiece. The Australians started again before lunch and this time their batting excelled with Taylor scoring 146 and Murray 82. From 362 for five overnight, Collins was able to declare at 447 for eight on the Saturday morning. Douglas took four more wickets, but this time conceding 168 runs, giving him eleven wickets in the match. In the fourth innings, the early Essex batsmen were no match for Gregory who took all the first five wickets, leaving the county on 22 for five. They eventually reached 117 and the Australians were easy winners in the end by 309 runs.

On Wednesday, 27 August, the Australians were at the Clifton College Close Ground and its strong associations with W. G. Grace, who had died in the autumn of the bleak year of 1915, to play Gloucestershire. This was another two-day match and another drawn two-day match, but it was Gloucestershire, not the AIF, who were cheated of time in this one. They won the toss and batted, scoring 281 (Charlie Townsend 63, Alf Dipper 61) and then reduced the AIF to 104 for six at close of play. On the second morning, the AIF were all out for 147 and asked to follow on. Gloucestershire's great left arm spinner Charlie Parker did the damage with seven for 70. In the second innings, the Australians were struggling against the medium pace of Dipper, bowling in tandem with Parker, but thanks to a determined effort by Bill Trenerry they managed to hold on for the draw.

The AIF faced their last county opposition on Friday, 29 August in another two-day match, though they won this one. It was just down the road from Clifton at the Taunton County Ground where they defeated Somerset by 95 runs in a very low-scoring game: AIF 85 and 144 for four declared; Somerset 70 and 64. Only 363 runs in the entire game. The first day was impacted by rain and only 59 overs were bowled. The AIF were all out for 85 just before the scheduled close of play. They quickly dismissed Somerset for 70 in only 32 overs of the second morning. Seamer Charlie Winning and slow left armer Collins did all the bowling, Winning taking six for 30 and Collins four for 38. Collins followed up with 67* to give the Australians a useful lead of 159 going into the latter half of the last day. Somerset lasted only 28 overs as Collins wiped them out with a career-best eight for 31.

=== 1 to 13 September ===
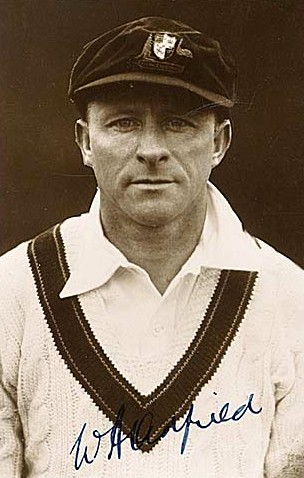
Bertie Oldfield

The AIF tour of England concluded with three first-class games against representative sides (i.e., consisting of players chosen from several counties) and finally a one-day exhibition match on what is believed to be the world's oldest cricket ground. The first-class matches were all of three-day duration starting on Monday, 1 September, against a South of England XI ("the South") at the Central Recreation Ground, Hastings; and then another game against the South on the United Services Recreation Ground in Portsmouth, starting Thursday, 4 September. Finally, to end their English programme, the AIF played C. I. Thornton's XI at the North Marine Road Ground, Scarborough, starting on Monday, 8 September and ending on Wednesday, 10 September. This game also concluded the 1919 Scarborough Festival.

At Hastings, the South were captained by Kent skipper Lionel Troughton who won the toss and batted first. He led a strong team which included Frank Woolley, Phil Mead, Jack White, Dick Young, Wally Hardinge, Arthur Gilligan and the Relf brothers. The South were bowled out for 183, Charlie Winning capturing five for 57, in 64 overs. The AIF collapsed and were 96 for six at the close before going on to total 162 in the second morning. Willis with 54 saved real embarrassment as Woolley took six for 74 and White four for 50. At close of play on day two, the South had advanced to 269 for six with Hardinge 90 not out. They were all out for 280 next morning with Hardinge stumped before he could add to his overnight score. Needing 302 to win with nearly all the final day remaining, the AIF could only make 179, Bill Trenerry topscoring with 54, and the South won by 122 runs.

The South made some changes for the match in Portsmouth, including the captaincy which was taken up by Lionel Tennyson. He won the toss and chose to bat first but soon found that conditions were to the liking of Gregory who blew the South away by taking five of the first seven wickets to fall. Gregory then held two catches off Collins before dismissing the last man to post a return of six for 42 off only 14.3 overs. Collins took three for 41 and his third wicket, one of Gregory's catches, was his hundredth of the season which meant he had completed the "Double" of 1,000 runs and 100 wickets in a season. The South totalled 104 and, at the close of a rain-affected day, the AIF were 23 for two. The Australians were all out for 206 after Murray scored 59 and Collins a steady 46. The South collapsed again and were all out for 115, Charlie Winning capturing five for 30 and Bill Stirling three for 25. The Australians had time to reach the necessary 15 to conclude matters with a day to spare, winning by ten wickets.

The Australians travelled up to Scarborough over the weekend ready for their final first-class fixture against "Buns" Thornton's team on the Monday. Thornton had selected a strong team captained by Reggie Spooner and including George Hirst, Wilfred Rhodes, Jack Hobbs, Johnny Douglas, Arthur Dolphin, Greville Stevens and Bill Hitch. It was a good toss to win and Spooner put the Australians in to face the pace of Hitch who bowled them out for 81 in just 31 overs. Hitch took five of the first six wickets, four of them bowled, and finished with six for 24. The early fire had gone out of the pitch by afternoon although Gregory still caused real problems for the English batsmen. At the close, Thornton's XI were 146 for eight and they extended this to 187, Gregory taking seven for 83. Needing a substantial recovery, the AIF started badly with Trenerry out for a duck but Collins and Willis took the score on to 93 before Collins was out. Willis, the highest runscorer for the AIF in England, made 96 before he was caught behind off Hirst. Taylor (71) and Lampard (36) combined well for the seventh wicket and the Australians were 264 for six at close of play on day two. On the final morning, Hitch again cut loose and the last four wickets went down with only 32 more runs added. AIF 296, Hitch five for 102 and eleven wickets in the match. Thornton's XI needed 191 to win with most of the final day remaining and got them with two wickets to spare but they owed it to Hobbs who held the innings together with 93. This was only the fourth defeat the AIF conceded in England, having won and drawn twelve each of the other 24 matches.

Chris Harte's conclusion of the AIF in England was that they were "generally a very sound side" and the crowds watching them were "far above expectation". Collins with 1,615 runs at 38.45 was widely considered the best Australian batsman in England although, statistically, Willis did better with 1,652 runs at 41.30. Pellew and Taylor also topped 1,000 runs while Trenerry (961) and Gregory (942) came close. Gregory held 44 catches at slip while the second best fielder was Taylor with 23 catches. Wicketkeeping duties were shared between Long and Oldfield who claimed 31 and 28 victims respectively. Gregory was easily the outstanding bowler and took 131 wickets at 18.19. Collins, who completed the "double", took 106 at 16.55. Next best was Lampard with 69 at 23.26 including the best analysis by an Australian of nine for 42 against Lancashire. Lampard also scored 821 runs and was a very useful all-rounder.

=== Mitcham v AIF ===
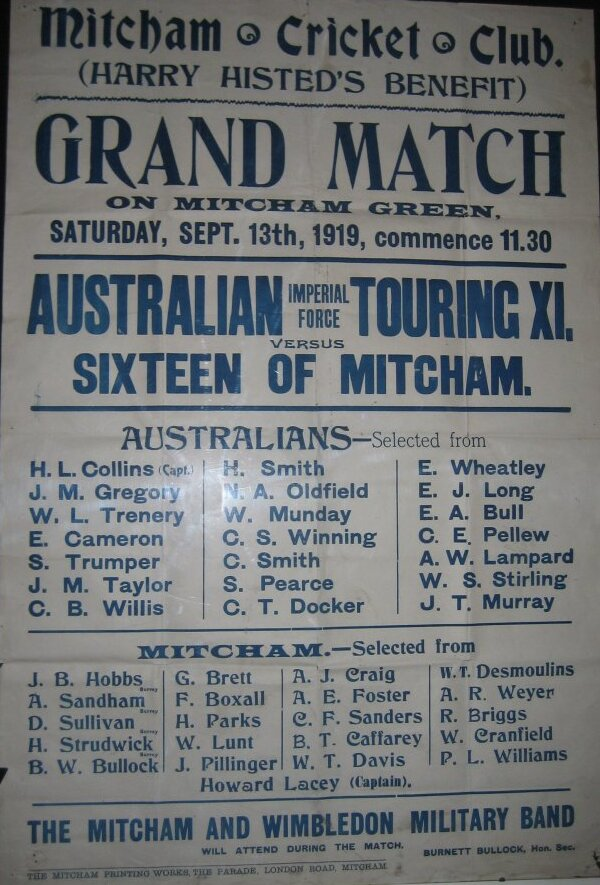
1919 poster advertising Australian Imperial Force Touring XI v Sixteen of Mitcham (see notes in text)

The AIF tour of England ended on Saturday, 13 September with a one-day single-innings "odds" match against a Mitcham XVI on Mitcham Cricket Green, which is believed to be the world's oldest extant cricket ground. The image (see right) is a 1919 poster advertising Australian Imperial Force Touring XI v Sixteen of Mitcham (Bertie Oldfield's initials and Bill Trenerry's name were misprinted). The Australian names include reserve players W. Munday and C. Smith who both played in the match for the AIF, while Bill Stirling played as a given man for Mitcham.

As advertised in the poster, Mitcham hoped to include Jack Hobbs, Andy Sandham and Bert Strudwick but none of these took part on the day. Mitcham's sixteen was bolstered by the inclusion of three guest players, one of them Bill Stirling. The other two were Surrey wicketkeeper Dennis Sullivan, who was born in Mitcham, and amateur Burnett Bullock, who was "mine host" at the public house opposite the ground that now bears his name. Mitcham batted first and scored 200 all out, their captain Howard Lacey making the top score with 39. Trenerry and Collins shared twelve of the fifteen wickets while Gregory was bowled sparingly. The AIF included a couple of players from their second eleven but they won easily by five wickets, though Stirling took the wickets of Murray and Docker cheaply.

== Tour of South Africa ==
The AIF team arrived in Cape Town on 13 October and Chris Harte recounted that it was on this same day that the Australian state cricket associations "started squabbling over who would host AIF matches in Australia". The South African Cricket Association had given a guarantee against any financial loss but the AIF tour of South Africa was a resounding success.

The first match in South Africa was played 18 to 21 October at the Newlands Cricket Ground in Cape Town against Western Province. The Australians conceded first innings lead but won by two wickets, largely thanks to the bowling of Lampard who had match figures of twelve for 100. The next match was 25 to 28 October on the Old Wanderers ground in Johannesburg against Transvaal and was drawn.

From 1 to 4 November, the Australians were in Durban to play Natal and won this one convincingly by 310 runs. They batted first and were bowled out for 158, Collins making 76, but then dismissed Natal for only 83 with Gregory taking nine for 32, the best analysis of his entire career. The one wicket he didn't get was a run out. The Australians did much better in their second innings and amassed 341 with Taylor's 81 the highest score. Once again, Natal were no match for Gregory who took five for 54 and bowled them out for 106. Natal should have had enough after that but they played the AIF again on 7 and 8 November in Pietermaritzburg, a three-day match completed in two with the AIF winning by an innings and 42 runs. In the first innings, Natal were routed in only 19 overs for 45, Gregory taking seven for 21. The Australians replied with 282 and were all out just before close of play, Taylor scoring 78 and Pellew 62. Natal were dismissed for 195 on the second day to end the match, this time Collins being the main bowler with six for 55.

The AIF returned to the Old Wanderers 15 to 18 November and played a second match against Transvaal, this time winning by an innings and 14 runs. Transvaal were dismissed for 165 with Stirling taking five for 29. The AIF replied with 352, Gregory scoring 73 and Pellew 61. Transvaal scored 173 in their second inning with Test batsman Billy Zulch making 95. Cyril Docker took five for 20.

The next two matches, both at the Old Wanderers, were scheduled for four days each and the AIF played against a South African national team in what may be termed "unofficial Tests". The first played 21 to 25 November was won by eight wickets and the second played 29 November to 2 December by an innings and 129 runs. In the first game, South Africa won the toss and batted first but Gregory and Collins took five apiece to dismiss them for 127. The AIF responded with 441 and Collins produced the outstanding batting performance of the entire tour with a magnificent knock of 235 in 315 minutes with 23 boundaries. South Africa scored 359 to avoid the innings defeat, Zulch this time reaching his century with 135. The AIF then scored 47 for two to win on the fourth day.

The second match was even more conclusive. South Africa again won the toss and batted first but Gregory with six for 46 and Collins with four for 28 were too much for them and they were out for only 117. The Australians piled on the agony with 456 including four half-centuries, the top score being 73 by Lampard. Reduced by injuries to nine men, the South Africans could only make 210 in their second innings, Gregory taking four for 60.

The Australians returned to Cape Town and played Western Province again at Newlands 6 to 9 December. This match was drawn after the AIF scored 269 (Willis 94) and 164 for six declared, with Western Province scoring 153 (Docker five for 37) and 141 for seven.

== Tour of Australia ==
After a very public row, it was finally decided in Australia that the AIF would play three of the state teams: Victoria, New South Wales and Queensland. The team arrived home in December and were at the Melbourne Cricket Ground (MCG) 16 to 19 January for the first match against Victoria which they won by six wickets. Collins won the toss against his future Test captain Warwick Armstrong and put Victoria in. Gregory took seven for 22 and bowled them out for only 116. The AIF batsmen had to contend with Ted McDonald, Gregory's future Test bowling partner, and he took a modest three for 76 as Willis scored 111 in a total of 311. At close of play on the second day, Victoria had reached 31 for one. They totalled 270 all out with Lampard taking seven for 99. The AIF needed 76 to win and made hard work of it, losing four wickets to McDonald and Armstrong before Gregory saw them home.

The second match was at the Gabba in Brisbane against Queensland 24 to 27 January. This was a rain-affected draw in which the AIF, batting first, scored 215 and 319 for five declared. Queensland scored 146 and held on at the end with 144 for six to frustrate the AIF. Collins with 135 in the AIF second innings was the outstanding performer.

The last match of the tour and the swansong of the AIF team was played 31 January to 3 February at the Sydney Cricket Ground (SCG) against New South Wales (NSW) and the AIF won by 203 runs. The AIF batted first and Gregory opened against his home state, for whom he had yet to make his debut, and scored 122. They totalled 185 for three at the end of day one and went to 265 all out. Gregory batted for 170 minutes and hit nineteen boundaries. Bill Trenerry's brother Edwin was playing for NSW. NSW managed a slender first innings lead thanks to Test players Warren Bardsley and Stork Hendry who added 121 for the second wicket. Gregory followed his century with five for 65. In the second innings, Collins scored 129 and Gregory again reached three figures with 101 in 102 minutes with sixteen boundaries. Like Gregory, Collins was opposing his home state. The AIF totalled 395 to lead by 381 with nearly all the third day still to be played. NSW had no real hope of winning and collapsed instead, scoring 178 in 200 minutes with only Tommy Andrews offering any real resistance. He scored 65 and Gregory, looking for a match double, had to be content with three for 65.

== Aftermath and legacy ==
The New South Wales Cricket Association said in its July 1920 annual report that "(it is to be hoped) many of these players will be seen in our big matches next season". However, many of the fifteen players had pre-war careers in other spheres, such as banking or farming or medicine, to which they soon returned. Bull, Docker, Long, and Winning never played first-class cricket again after the AIF team disbanded. Stirling played just one more match, which was for South Australia against the touring MCC in November 1920. Trenerry played only three more first-class games. Lampard spent two more seasons with Victoria and retired in February 1922. Love, Murray, and Willis continued to play in the Sheffield Shield for several seasons, and Love eventually played for Australia just once in the 1932–33 Bodyline series. Even so, the AIF did bequeath a legacy to Australian Test cricket as Collins, Gregory, Oldfield, Pellew, and Taylor formed the nucleus of Warwick Armstrong's team in the next two years, during which they overwhelmed England in two Test series.

== Bibliography ==
- Harte, Chris (1993). A History of Australian Cricket. London: André Deutsch. ISBN 978-02-33988-25-2.
