= 1915 in sports =

Note — many sporting events did not take place because of World War I

1915 in sports describes the year's events in world sport.

== American football ==
College championship

- College football national championship – Cornell Big Red, Minnesota Golden Gophers, Oklahoma Sooners, Pittsburgh Panthers

Professional championships

- New York League champions – Rochester Jeffersons
- Ohio League champions – Youngstown Patricians

Events

- 14 November — Jim Thorpe plays his first professional football game, a 16–0 Canton Bulldogs loss to the Massillon Tigers. The game is also the first match-up between the two clubs since their 1906 betting scandal.

== Association football ==
England

- The Football League – Everton 46, Oldham Athletic 45, Blackburn Rovers 43, Burnley 43, Manchester City 43, Sheffield United 43
- FA Cup final – Sheffield United 3–0 Chelsea at Old Trafford, Manchester
- Football League membership at the end of the 1914–15 season is:

Division One (20 clubs) — Aston Villa, Blackburn Rovers, Bolton Wanderers, Bradford City, Bradford Park Avenue, Burnley, Chelsea, Everton, Liverpool, Manchester City, Manchester United, Middlesbrough, Newcastle United, Notts County, Oldham Athletic, Sheffield United, The Wednesday, Sunderland, Tottenham Hotspur, West Bromwich Albion
Division Two (20 clubs) — Arsenal, Barnsley, Birmingham City, Blackpool, Bristol City, Bury, Derby County, Fulham, Glossop, Grimsby Town, Huddersfield Town, Hull City, Leeds City, Leicester City, Leyton Orient, Lincoln City, Nottingham Forest, Preston North End, Stockport County, Wolverhampton Wanderers

- The continuance of World War I after the 1914–15 season causes the suspension of top-class football until 1919, with many footballers signing up to fight for their country. The FA Cup and Football League are not contested again until after the end of the war, although regional leagues and cups are set up at various times.

Germany

- National Championship – suspended during World War I

== Athletics ==
Marathon

- First official running of the Mount Marathon Race, Seward, Alaska

== Australian rules football ==
VFL Premiership

- 18 September: Carlton wins the 19th VFL Premiership, beating Collingwood 11.12 (78) to 6.9 (45) at the Melbourne Cricket Ground (MCG) in the 1915 VFL Grand Final.

South Australian Football League:

- 26 June: By drawing 4.8 (32) each with Port Adelaide, South Adelaide end the Magpies’ run of 29 consecutive victories, including one against Carlton and one against a combined team from the other six SAFL clubs.
- 25 September: Sturt win their first SAFL premiership, beating Port Adelaide 6.10 (46) to 4.10 (34) in the 1915 SAFL Grand Final.

West Australian Football League:

- 25 September: Subiaco 3.3 (21) defeat Perth 2.7 (19) for their third WAFL premiership.

== Bandy ==
Sweden

- Championship final – IFK Uppsala 2–0 AIK

== Baseball ==
World Series

- 8–13 October — Boston Red Sox (AL) defeats Philadelphia Phillies (NL) to win the 1915 World Series by 4 games to 1

== Boxing ==
Events

- 5 April — Jess Willard, the latest "Great White Hope", defeats Jack Johnson with a 26th-round knockout in sweltering heat at Havana, Cuba. Willard becomes very popular among white Americans for "bringing back the championship to the white race".
- While six world titles remain unchanged in 1915, the World Welterweight Championship changes hands three times in less than three months between June and August. Finally, it comes to Ted "Kid" Lewis, who defeats Jack Britton twice to win and then retain the title, which will interchange between these two over the next four years.

Lineal world champions

- World Heavyweight Championship – Jack Johnson → Jess Willard
- World Light Heavyweight Championship – Jack Dillon
- World Middleweight Championship – Al McCoy
- World Welterweight Championship – Matt Wells → Mike Glover → Jack Britton → Ted "Kid" Lewis
- World Lightweight Championship – Freddie Welsh
- World Featherweight Championship – Johnny Kilbane
- World Bantamweight Championship – Kid Williams
- World Flyweight Championship – Jimmy Wilde

== Canadian football ==
- Apart from a shortened 1916 season in Saskatchewan, this was the last season of play until the end of WW1
- Only one game was played in Manitoba, with the Winnipeg Tigers taking a 10–4 victory over the Winnipeg Canoe Club
- No matches were played in the college league
- Interprovincial Rugby Football Union - Hamilton Tigers
- Ontario Rugby Football Union - Hamilton Rowing Club
- Western Canada Rugby Football Union - Regina
- 7th Grey Cup – Hamilton Tigers defeat Hamilton Rowing Association 13–7

== Cricket ==
Events

- Because of World War I, there is no first-class cricket in South Africa in the 1914–15 season, nor in England in 1915. Australia goes ahead with the 1914–15 Sheffield Shield competition but then suspends first-class cricket until 1919. Similarly, in New Zealand, the Plunket Shield is contested but then there is no first-class cricket until 1918. Only in India is first-class cricket able to continue through the war years.

England

- County Championship – not contested due to World War I
- Minor Counties Championship – not contested due to World War I

Australia

- Sheffield Shield – Victoria
- Most runs – Jack Ryder 445 @ 74.16 (HS 151)
- Most wickets – Bert Ironmonger 36 @ 17.52 (BB 7–69)

India

- Bombay Quadrangular – Hindus shared with Parsees

New Zealand

- Plunket Shield – Canterbury

South Africa

- Currie Cup – not contested due to World War I

West Indies

- Inter-Colonial Tournament – not contested

== Cycling ==
Tour de France

- not contested due to World War I

Giro d'Italia

- not contested due to World War I

== Figure skating ==
World Figure Skating Championships

- not contested due to World War I

== Golf ==
Major tournaments

- British Open – not contested due to World War I
- US Open – Jerome Travers

Other tournaments

- British Amateur – not contested due to World War I
- US Amateur – Robert A. Gardner

== Horse racing ==
England

- Grand National – Ally Sloper
- 1,000 Guineas Stakes – Vaucluse
- 2,000 Guineas Stakes – Pommern
- The Derby – Pommern
- The Oaks – Snow Marten
- St. Leger Stakes – Pommern

Australia

- Melbourne Cup – Patrobas

Canada

- King's Plate – Tartarean

Ireland

- Irish Grand National – Punch
- Irish Derby Stakes – Ballaghtobin

USA

- Kentucky Derby – Regret
- Preakness Stakes – Rhine Maiden
- Belmont Stakes – The Finn

== Ice hockey ==
Stanley Cup

- 22–26 March — Vancouver Millionaires (PCHA) defeats Ottawa Senators (NHA) in the 1915 Stanley Cup Final by 3 games to 0

Events

- Winnipeg Monarchs win the Allan Cup

== Multi-sport events ==
Far Eastern Championship Games

- Second Far Eastern Championship Games held in Shanghai, Republic of China

== Rowing ==
The Boat Race

- Oxford and Cambridge Boat Race – not contested due to World War I

== Rugby league ==
Events

- Huddersfield becomes the second team to achieve the celebrated "All Four Cups" feat. Huddersfield at this time is known as the "Team of all the Talents".
- The continuance of World War I after the 1914–15 season causes the suspension of top-class rugby league until 1919.

England

- Championship – Huddersfield
- Challenge Cup final – Huddersfield 37–3 St. Helens at Watersheddings, Oldham
- Lancashire League Championship – Wigan
- Yorkshire League Championship – Huddersfield
- Lancashire County Cup – Rochdale Hornets 3–2 Wigan
- Yorkshire County Cup – Huddersfield 31–0 Hull

Australia

- NSW Premiership – Balmain (outright winner)

== Rugby union ==
Five Nations Championship

- Five Nations Championship series is not contested due to World War I

== Speed skating ==
Speed Skating World Championships

- not contested due to World War I

== Tennis ==
Australia

- Australian Men's Singles Championship – Gordon Lowe (GB) defeats Horace Rice (Australia) 4–6 6–1 6–1 6–4

England

- Wimbledon Men's Singles Championship – not contested due to World War I
- Wimbledon Women's Singles Championship – not contested due to World War I

France

- French Men's Singles Championship – not contested due to World War I
- French Women's Singles Championship – not contested due to World War I

USA

- American Men's Singles Championship – Bill Johnston (USA) defeats Maurice McLoughlin (USA) 1–6 6–0 7–5 10–8
- American Women's Singles Championship – Molla Bjurstedt Mallory (Norway) defeats Hazel Hotchkiss Wightman (USA) 4–6 6–2 6–0

Davis Cup

- 1915 International Lawn Tennis Challenge – not contested
