= Frederick Hanson (disambiguation) =

Frederick Hanson is an Australian police officer.

Frederick Hanson or Fred Hanson may also refer to:

- Frederick Hanson (cricketer) (1872–1917), Australian cricketer
- Fred Hanson (footballer) (1888–1979), Australian rules footballer
- Frederick Hanson (engineer) (1895–1979), New Zealand engineer, military leader and public servant
