= Charles Winning =

Australian cricketer

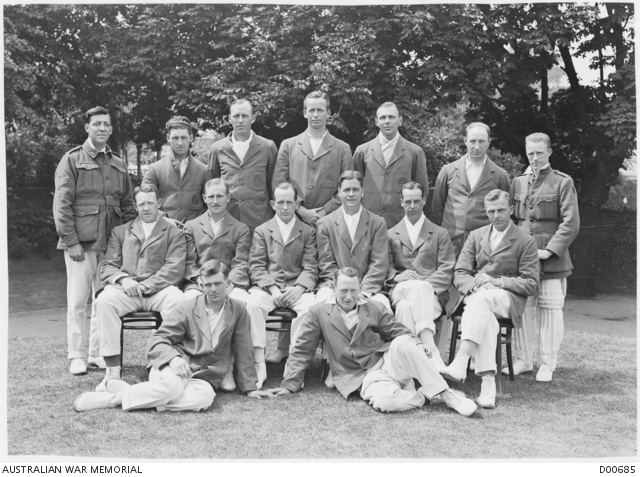
The Australian Imperial Force Touring XI photographed at Lord's Cricket Ground in June 1919. Charles Winning is first left in the back row.

Charles Samuel Winning (17 July 1889 – 20 April 1967) was an Australian cricketer active from 1914 to 1920 who played for New South Wales and the Australian Imperial Force Touring XI. He was born in Paddington, New South Wales and died in Newport, New South Wales. He appeared in 28 first-class matches as a right-handed batsman who bowled right arm medium pace. He scored 253 runs with a highest score of 30 and took 67 wickets with a best performance of six for 30. Although he played for New South Wales at junior level before the First World War, he never took part in the Sheffield Shield and all his first-class appearances were for the Australian Imperial Force (AIF) Touring XI. He retired after the AIF team disbanded.
