= Eric Bull =

Australian cricketer

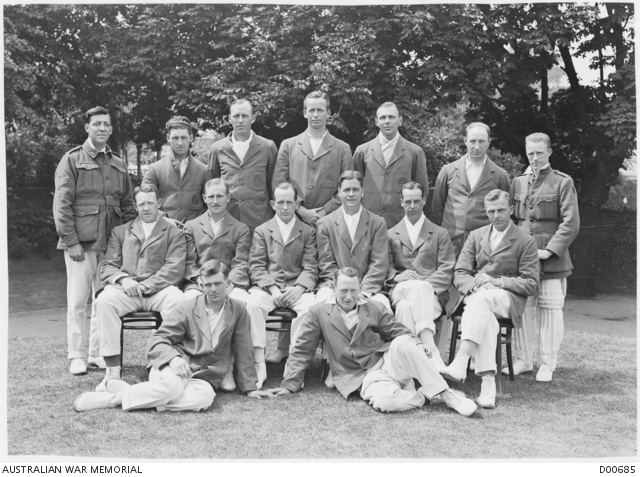
The Australian Imperial Force Touring XI photographed at Lord's Cricket Ground in June 1919. Eric Bull is fourth left on the back row.

Eric Alister Bull (28 September 1886 – 14 May 1954) was an Australian cricketer active from 1913 to 1920 who played for New South Wales and the Australian Imperial Force Touring XI. He was born in Bourke, New South Wales and died in Sydney. He appeared in 23 first-class matches as a right-handed batsman who bowled leg break. He scored 595 runs with a highest score of 42 and took four wickets with a best performance of two for 8.
