= Allie Lampard =

Australian cricketer

Albert Lampard
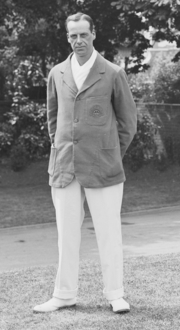

Personal information
- Full name: Albert Wallis Lampard
- Born: 3 July 1885; Richmond, Melbourne, Australia
- Died: 11 January 1984 (aged 98); Armadale, Melbourne, Australia

Domestic team information
- Years: Team
- 1909–1922: Victoria
- Source: Cricinfo, 15 November 2015

Albert Wallis Lampard (3 July 1885 – 11 January 1984) was an Australian cricketer active from 1908 to 1922 who played for Victoria and the Australian Imperial Force Touring XI. He was born in Richmond, Melbourne and died in Armadale, Victoria. He appeared in 63 first-class matches as a right-handed batsman who bowled right arm leg break and googly. A genuine all rounder, he scored 2,597 runs with a highest score of 132 among three centuries and took 134 wickets with a best performance of nine for 42.
