= Harry Heath =

Australian cricketer and clergyman (1885–1967)

Henry Francis Trafford "Harry" Heath (19 December 1885 – 9 July 1967) was an Australian cricketer and clergyman.

Born in Kadina, South Australia, Heath appeared in three first-class matches for the Australian Imperial Force Touring XI and South Australia between 1919 and 1924 as a left-handed batsman who bowled left-arm slow-medium pace. His best performance was 5 for 43 in a Sheffield Shield match against New South Wales in December 1923. A late inclusion in the South Australian side, he bowled through the first innings unchanged to dismiss New South Wales for 98; all five of his victims were Test batsmen. At the time he was the Methodist minister at the inner Adelaide suburb of Rose Park.

Heath served as a Methodist chaplain to the Australian armed forces in World War I. He married Irene Whellas Bain at the United Free Church of Scotland in Aberdeen on 12 September 1919. They returned to South Australia in 1920, but a few years later they moved to Scotland, where he became a minister in the United Free Church in Edinburgh in 1926. He died in Edinburgh on 9 July 1967.
