= Carl Willis (Australian sportsman) =

Australian rules footballer and cricketer

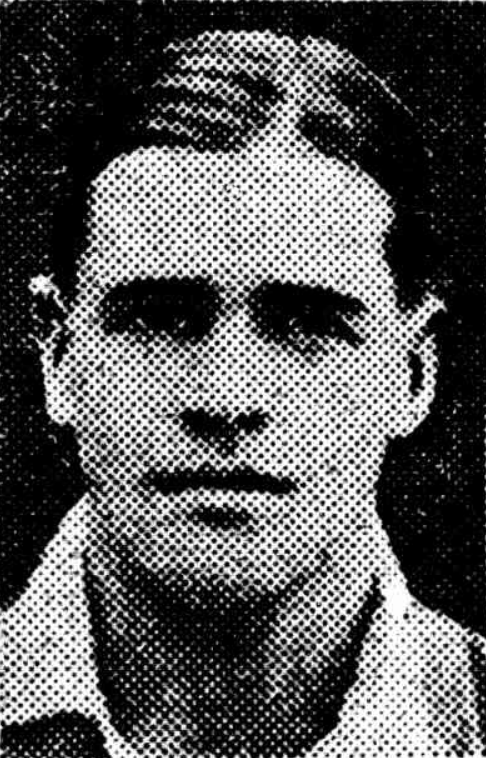

Personal information
- Full name: Carl Bleackley Willis
- Born: 24 March 1893; Daylesford, Victoria
- Died: 12 May 1930 (aged 37); Berrigan, New South Wales
- Original team: Wesley College, Melbourne

Playing career^{1}
Years	Club	Games (Goals)
1912–14	University	46 (41)
1915, 1920–21	South Melbourne	29 (18)
Total		75 (59)
- ^{1} Playing statistics correct to the end of 1921.

Career highlights
- AIF Pioneer Exhibition Game, London, 28 October 1916

Carl Bleakley Willis (24 March 1893 – 12 May 1930) was an Australian sportsman who played Australian rules football with South Melbourne and University in the Victorian Football League (VFL) as well as first-class cricket for Victoria.

== Family ==
The son of Thomas Rupert Henry Willis (1860-1933), and Mary Wilson Willis (1867-1949), née Bleakley, Carl Bleakley Willis was born at Daylesford, Victoria on 24 March 1893.

== Education ==
Willis was educated at Wesley College, Melbourne, and the University of Melbourne, graduating with a Bachelor of Dental Science (BDSc) in December 1915.

== Football ==
=== University (VFL) ===
He was a regular player for University in 1912, his first season.

=== Tribunal ===
He was suspended for four weeks after being reported by a steward for punching Fred Hanson in the match against St Kilda, at the M.C.G. on 18 May 1912.

It was the first time in VFL history that a player had been suspended by a steward; and Willis was the only University player to be suspended during the club's VFL existence.

=== South Melbourne (VFL) ===
He was cleared from University to South Melbourne in the 1915 pre-season.

He captained South Melbourne in the 1921 season.

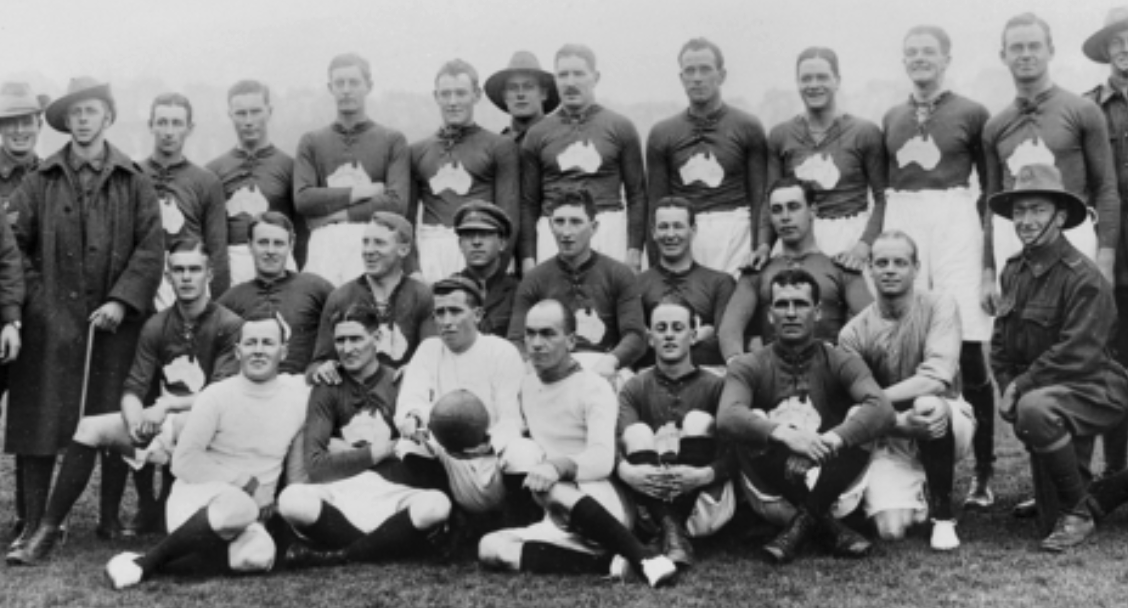
The Third Australian Divisional Team: 28 October 1916. Carl Willis is the third player from right, back row.

=== Pioneer Exhibition Game" (London, October 1916) ===
He played for the (winning) Third Australian Divisional team in the famous "Pioneer Exhibition Game" of Australian Rules football, held in London, on Saturday, 28 October 1916. A news film was taken at the match.

== Military service ==
He enlisted in November 1915 and served as a dentist with the Australian Army Medical Corps Dental Detail.

He served in France in late 1916, but was gassed, hospitalised and returned to England, taking charge of a dental unit on Salisbury Plain. He rose to the rank of captain in July 1918.

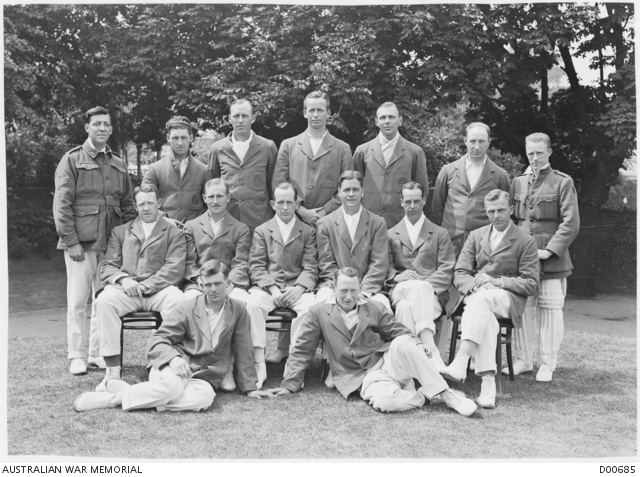
The Australian Imperial Forces cricket team in London in 1919 (Carl Willis middle row, 4th from left)

== Cricket ==
His cricket career, which began in 1913–14, continued after he retired as a footballer. Willis represented the Australian Imperial Forces team in 1918 and 1919, and Victoria from 1914 to 1928. He was selected to tour New Zealand in 1920–21 with the Australian team but was unavailable.

== Dentist ==
He practised dentistry in the Melbourne suburb of Malvern until 1929, when he moved to Numurkah in northern Victoria and then to Tocumwal in New South Wales.

== Death ==
He died of pneumonia on 12 May 1930 in Berrigan, New South Wales, and was buried at the Melbourne General Cemetery on 14 May 1930.

== See also ==
- List of Victoria first-class cricketers
- 1916 Pioneer Exhibition Game
