= Ed Long (cricketer) =

Australian cricketer

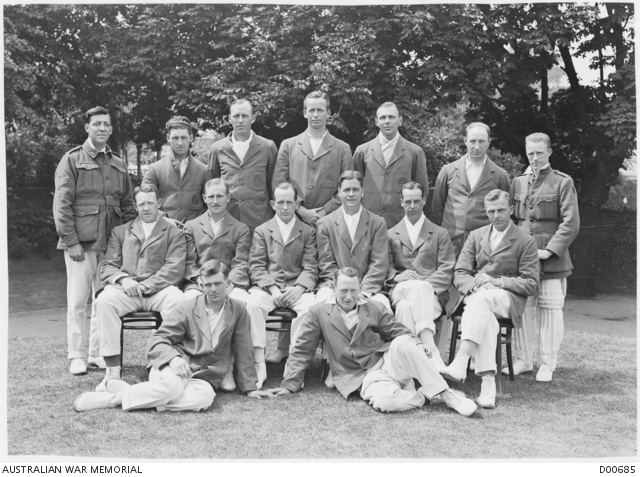
The Australian Imperial Force Touring XI photographed at Lord's Cricket Ground in June 1919. Ed Long is second right in the back row.

Edmund James ("Ed") Long (28 March 1883 – 8 December 1947) was an Australian cricketer active from 1911 to 1920 who played for New South Wales and the Australian Imperial Force Touring XI. He was born in Darlinghurst, Sydney and died in Leichhardt, New South Wales. He appeared in 18 first-class matches as a right-handed batsman who kept wicket. He scored 135 runs with a highest score of 24 and completed 20 catches with 12 stumpings.

== See also ==
- List of New South Wales representative cricketers
