= Hammy Love =

Australian cricketer

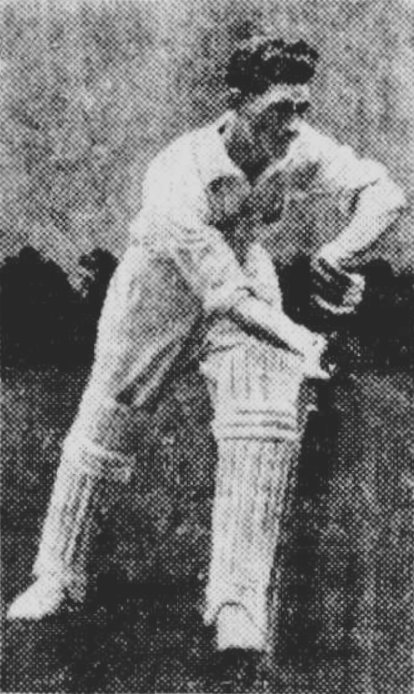
- Love in 1921

Personal information
- Born: 10 August 1895; Lilyfield, Sydney, New South Wales
- Died: 22 July 1969 (aged 73); Mosman, Sydney, New South Wales
- Batting: Right-handed
- Bowling: -

International information
- National side: Australia
- Only Test (cap 148): 10 February 1933 v England

Career statistics
| Competition | Test | First-class |
|---|---|---|
| Matches | 1 | 54 |
| Runs scored | 8 | 2,906 |
| Batting average | 4.00 | 35.01 |
| 100s/50s | 0/0 | 7/11 |
| Top score | 5 | 192 |
| Catches/stumpings | 3/0 | 73/29 |
- Source: Cricinfo, 5 November 2022

Hampden Stanley Bray Love (10 August 1895 – 22 July 1969) was an Australian cricketer who played in one Test match for the Australia national cricket team in 1933. He replaced Bert Oldfield as wicket-keeper for the Ashes match played at Brisbane after Oldfield retired hurt in the Adelaide test of the Bodyline series. Love made his debut for New South Wales in the 1920–21 season but later switched to Victoria in order to gain more opportunities. He was Australia's second choice keeper for the first half of the 1930s but was unable to get a game due to Bert Oldfield's keeping ability. He also was a more than useful batsman, hitting seven hundreds in 54 games with a top score of 192.
