= Cyril Docker =

Australian cricketer

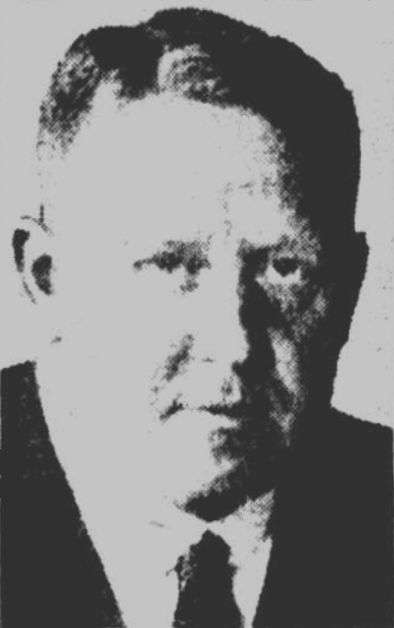
Cyril Docker, 1924.

Cyril Talbot Docker MBE (3 March 1884 – 26 March 1975) was an Australian cricketer active from 1909 to 1920 who played for New South Wales and the Australian Imperial Force Touring XI. He was born in Ryde, Sydney and died in Double Bay, Sydney. He was one of four sons of John Frederick Docker, older brother of Australian cricketer Keith Docker, and a grandson of English-Australian grazier and politician Joseph Docker.

He appeared in 24 first-class matches as a right-handed batsman who bowled right arm fast medium pace. He scored 371 runs with a highest score of 52* and took 58 wickets with a best performance of five for 20.

Docker served with the First Australian Imperial Force in World War I, reaching the rank of captain. At the Battle of Pozières in 1916 he led a group that charged the German trenches, killing 60 of the enemy and capturing four. Shortly afterwards he was injured in a bomb attack, and later suffered from shell shock. He was a made a Member of the Most Excellent Order of the British Empire (MBE) in the Military Division for "most valuable services rendered in the War" in the King's Birthday Honours in 1919.

Docker played one match for New South Wales in 1909 and the other 23 matches of his first-class career for the AIF team between May 1919 and February 1920. He later had a successful banking career with the English, Scottish & Australian Bank in Australia and overseas, and served as head of the Australian Comforts Fund in World War II.

In 1951 he married Hazel May Pearse (nee Sly) in Sydney.
