= Jack Murray (cricketer) =

Australian cricketer

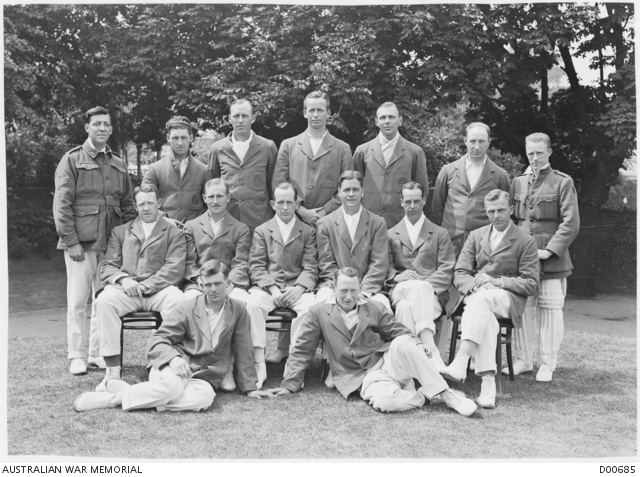
The Australian Imperial Force Touring XI photographed at Lord's Cricket Ground in June 1919. Jack Murray is third left in the back row.

John Tinline Murray (1 December 1892 – 19 September 1974) was an Australian cricketer active from 1909 to 1926 who played for South Australia and the Australian Imperial Force Touring XI. He was born in Norwood, South Australia and died in Stirling, South Australia. He appeared in 23 first-class matches as a right-handed batsman who bowled right arm medium pace. He scored 1,964 runs with a highest score of 152 among four centuries and took twelve wickets with a best performance of two for 63.
