= Lance Pellew =

Australian cricketer

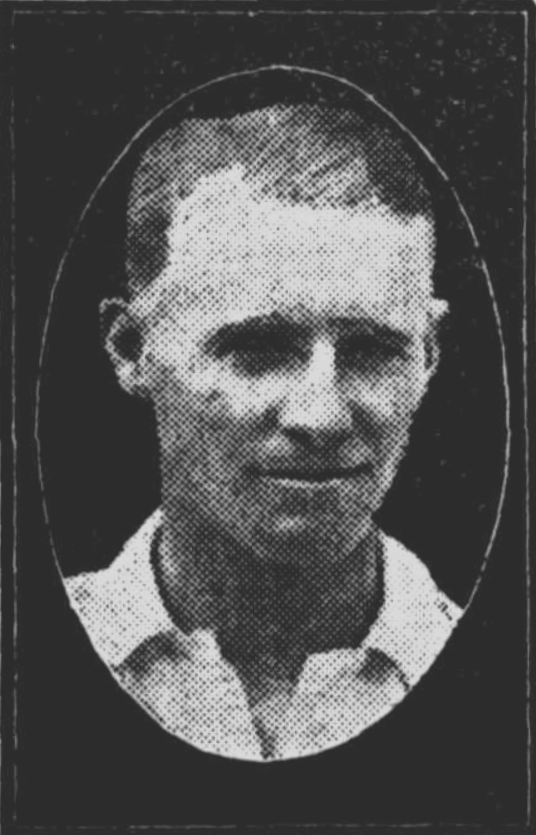

Personal information
- Full name: Lancelot Vivian Pellew
- Born: 15 December 1899; Port Elliot, South Australia
- Died: 8 December 1970 (aged 70); Adelaide, South Australia
- Batting: Right-handed
- Relatives: Nip Pellew (brother)

Domestic team information
- Years: Team
- 1919/20–1922/23: South Australia

Career statistics
Competition	First-class
Matches	15
Runs scored	656
Batting average	27.33
100s/50s	0/5
Top score	81
Balls bowled
Wickets	1
Bowling average	119.00
5 wickets in innings	0
10 wickets in match	0
Best bowling	1/23
Catches/stumpings	2/0
- Source: Cricinfo, 22 April 2017

Lancelot Vivian Pellew CMG (15 December 1899 – 8 December 1970) was a cricketer who played first-class cricket for South Australia from 1920 to 1923. He was later a prominent lawyer and judge in Adelaide.

== Early life and sporting career ==
Pellew attended St Peter's College, Adelaide, playing in the cricket First XI, which he captained in 1918. He went on to the University of Adelaide to study law.

He made his first-class debut for South Australia in the Sheffield Shield match against Victoria at the end of February 1920. He scored 25 and, in the second innings, 57 while his elder brother Clarrie, later known as "Nip", scored 271. He played three matches in the 1920-21 season, scoring 203 runs with two fifties at an average of 40.60. He was selected to tour New Zealand with the Australian team at the end of the season, but was not a success there, scoring only 52 runs in five matches.

He played three matches in 1921-22, scoring 81 (South Australia's highest score in the match) and 40 batting at number three against New South Wales. He was less successful in three matches in 1922-23, his last season of first-class cricket.

He was also a leading amateur athlete. He won the 100 and 220 yards sprints and the 120 yards hurdles at the 1919 South Australia state championships. At the 1922 Australian Inter-Varsity Championships he won the 100 yards in 10.2 seconds and the 220 yards in 23.2 seconds, setting the inter-varsity record for the distance.

== Later life and career ==
Pellew moved to Clare to work as a solicitor in 1923 and made himself unavailable for the state cricket team. He married Maisie Smith of Elsternwick, Victoria, in Melbourne in November 1924.

He returned to Adelaide in 1925 to take up the position of associate to the Acting Chief Justice. He played in a trial match at the start of the 1925-26 season but did not return to the state team.

In the 1930s Pellew served as a member of the South Australian National Football League tribunal. In 1942 he was appointed Acting Deputy Master of the South Australian Supreme Court. In 1945 he became a magistrate. He served as President of the South Australian Industrial Court from 1952 until his retirement in December 1964. He was appointed a Companion of the Order of St Michael and St George in the 1964 Birthday Honours.
