= Keith Docker =

Australian cricketer

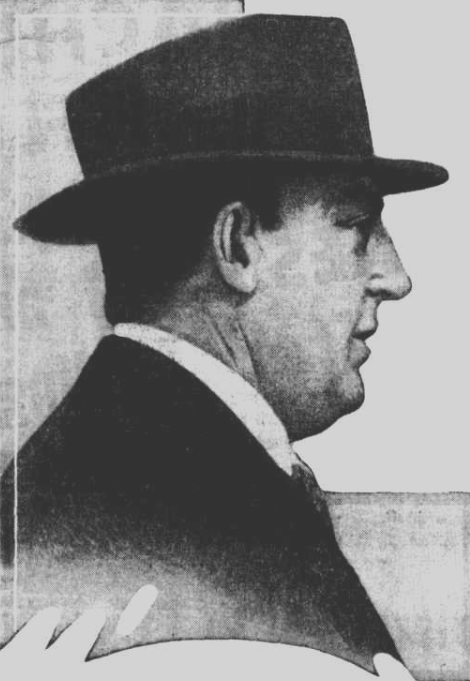

Personal information
- Born: 1 September 1888; Sydney, New South Wales, Australia
- Died: 16 May 1977 (aged 88); Ashfield, New South Wales, Australia
- Source: ESPNcricinfo, 26 December 2016

Keith Docker (1 September 1888 – 16 May 1977) was an Australian cricketer. He played two first-class matches for New South Wales in 1919/20. He was one of four sons of John Frederick Docker, younger brother of Australian cricketer Cyril Docker, and a grandson of English-Australian grazier and politician Joseph Docker.

== See also ==
- List of New South Wales representative cricketers
