= Bill Stirling (cricketer) =

Australian cricketer (1891–1971)

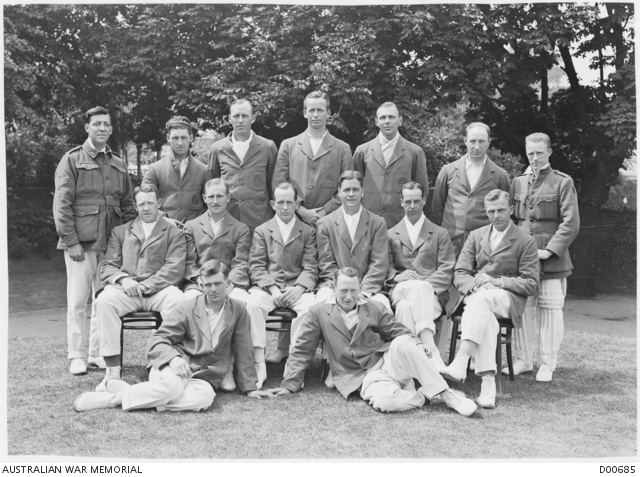
The Australian Imperial Force Touring XI photographed at Lord's Cricket Ground in June 1919. Bill Stirling is on the right at the front.

William Stuart Stirling (19 March 1891 – 18 July 1971) was an Australian cricketer active from 1908 to 1921 who played for South Australia and the Australian Imperial Force Touring XI. He was born in Jamestown, South Australia and died in Adelaide. He appeared in 47 first-class matches as a right-handed batsman who bowled left arm medium pace. He scored 931 runs with a highest score of 62 and took 61 wickets with a best performance of five for 26.
