= Bill Trenerry =

Australian cricketer

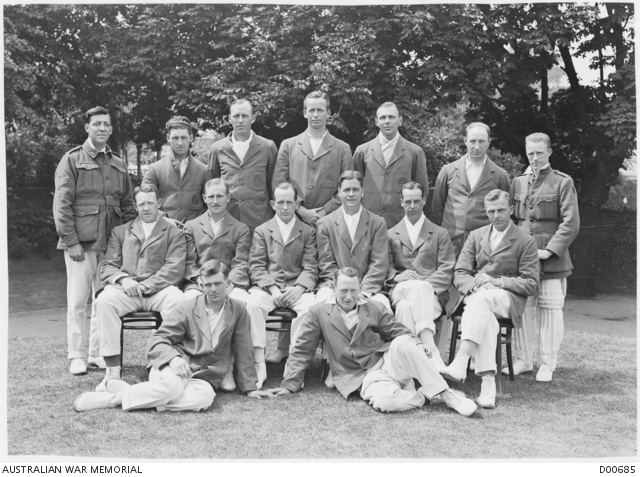
The Australian Imperial Force Touring XI photographed at Lord's Cricket Ground in June 1919. Bill Trennery is first right middle row.

William Trenerry (29 November 1892 – 4 September 1975) was an Australian cricketer active from 1913 to 1925 who played for New South Wales and the Australian Imperial Force Touring XI. He was born in Queanbeyan, New South Wales, and died in Mosman, New South Wales. He appeared in 38 first-class matches as a right-handed batsman who bowled leg break. He scored 1,547 runs with a highest score of 82 and took ten wickets with a best performance of three for 28.
