= Ted Trenerry =

Australian cricketer

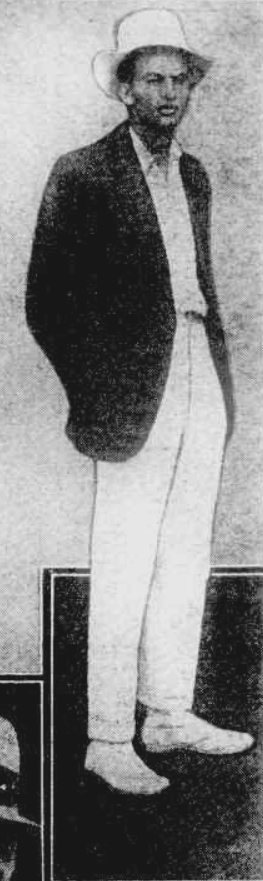

Personal information
- Full name: Edwin Trenerry
- Born: 24 February 1897; Queanbeyan, New South Wales, Australia
- Died: 8 July 1983 (aged 86); Woollahra, New South Wales, Australia
- Source: ESPNcricinfo, 4 February 2017

Ted Trenerry (24 February 1897 – 8 July 1983) was an Australian cricketer. He played five first-class matches for New South Wales between 1919/20 and 1920/21.

== See also ==
- List of New South Wales representative cricketers
