= Fred Hanson (footballer) =

Australian rules footballer

Personal information
- Full name: Frederick George Austral Hanson
- Born: 15 May 1888; St Kilda, Victoria
- Died: 21 September 1979 (aged 91); Bulleen, Victoria
- Original team: Footscray
- Height: 174 cm (5 ft 9 in)
- Weight: 72 kg (159 lb)

Playing career^{1}
Years	Club	Games (Goals)
1908–11	Footscray (VFA)	63 (4)
1912–13	St Kilda	18 (0)
- ^{1} Playing statistics correct to the end of 1913.

Frederick George Austral Hanson (15 May 1888 – 21 September 1979) was an Australian rules footballer who played with St Kilda in the Victorian Football League (VFL).
