= Nip Pellew =

Australian cricketer

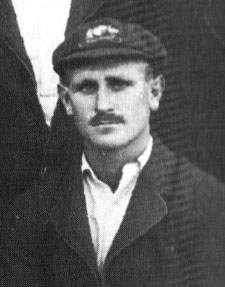

Personal information
- Full name: Clarence Everard Pellew
- Born: 21 September 1893; Port Pirie, South Australia
- Died: 9 May 1981 (aged 87); Adelaide, South Australia
- Nickname: Nip
- Batting: Right-handed
- Bowling: Right-arm medium
- Relatives: Lance Pellew (brother)

International information
- National side: Australia
- Test debut (cap 110): 17 December 1920 v England
- Last Test: 26 November 1921 v South Africa

Domestic team information
- Years: Team
- 1913/14–1928/29: South Australia

Career statistics
Competition	Test	First-class
Matches	10	91
Runs scored	484	4,536
Batting average	37.23	33.60
100s/50s	2/1	9/21
Top score	116	271
Balls bowled	78	1,673
Wickets	0	12
Bowling average	–	70.75
5 wickets in innings	–	0
10 wickets in match	–	0
Best bowling	–	3/119
Catches/stumpings	4/–	43/–
- Source: CricketArchive, 22 April 2017

Clarence Everard "Nip" Pellew (21 September 1893 – 9 May 1981) was an Australian cricketer who played in 10 Test matches from 1920 to 1921.

== Career ==
Pellew was also a leading Australian rules footballer who, due to permit problems, was only allowed to play one game for North Adelaide Football Club in the South Australian National Football League (SANFL). He played in the centre against Sturt Football Club's star player Vic Richardson (who also played Test cricket).

He was regarded as an exceptionally brilliant fieldsman, his "running, picking up and throwing in are a positive joy to behold". In 1946 Dudley Carew wrote, "across the years the memory of the fair-haired Pellew, of the Australian Forces team of 1919, stands out in thousands of minds while the centuries and hat-tricks of more famous players have grown dim". His Wisden obituary noted: "Credited with being able to run the 100 yards in 10.2 seconds and to throw a cricket ball over 100 yards, he might well, after sprinting 40 yards round the boundary, save not one run but two or three, so swiftly did he get rid of the ball. In any discussion of the world's greatest outfields, he must be a candidate for a place."

He was South Australia's state coach from 1930 till the Second World War, and again from 1958 to 1970.

Pellew's brother Lance Pellew also played first-class cricket for South Australia.

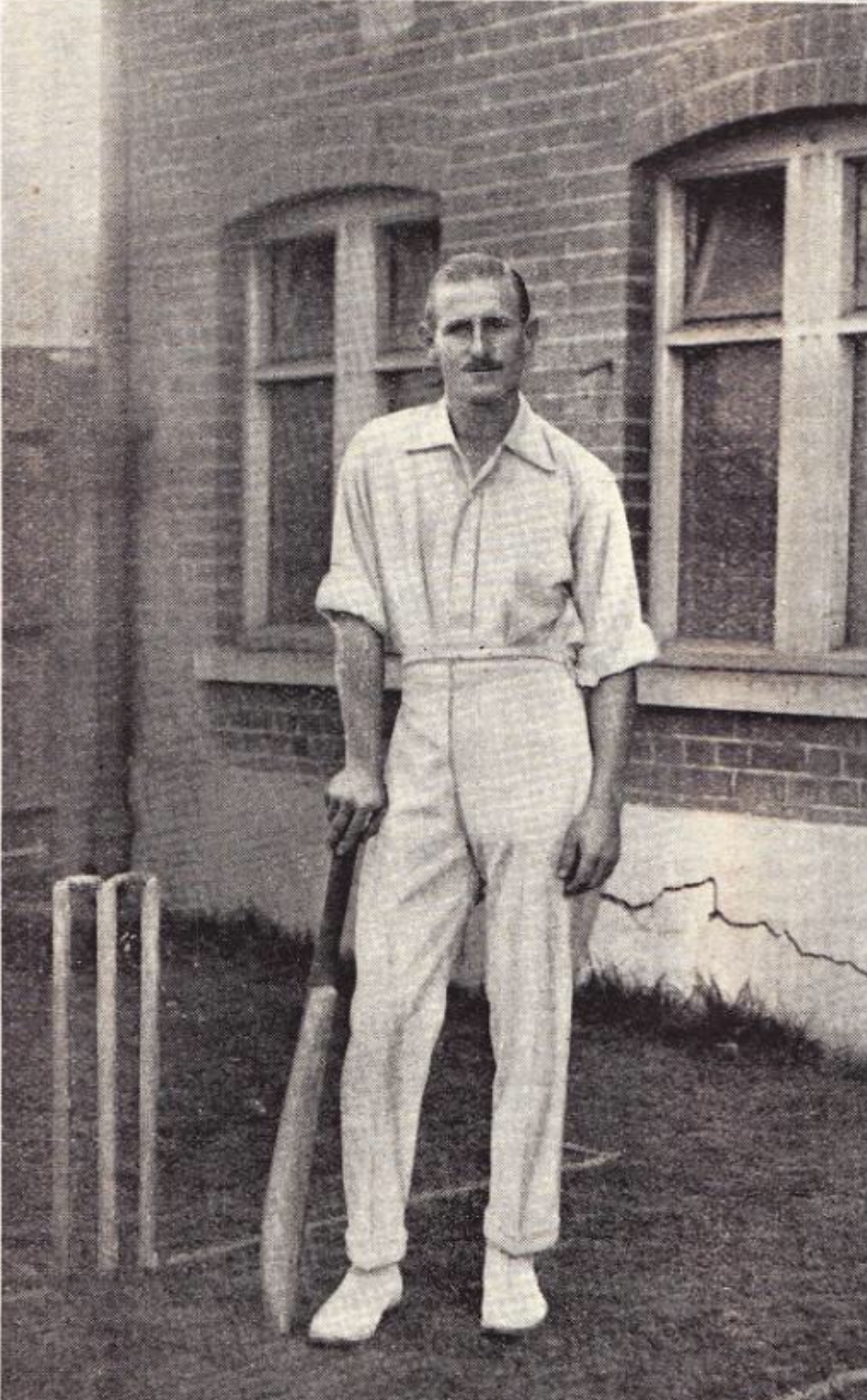
CE Pellew 1921

== Sources ==
- Carew, D. (1946) To the Wicket, Chapman & Hall, London.
- Atkinson, G. (1982) Everything you ever wanted to know about Australian rules football but couldn't be bothered asking, The Five Mile Press: Melbourne. ISBN 0 86788 009 0.
