= Charlie Kelleway =

Australian cricketer

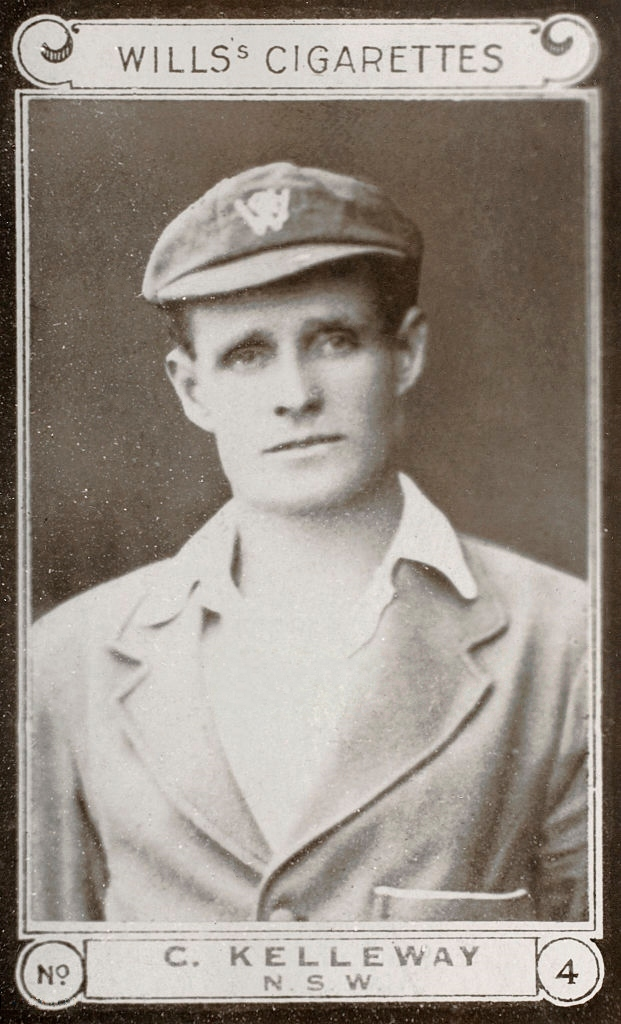
- Kelleway c. 1920

Personal information
- Full name: Charles Kelleway
- Born: 25 April 1886; Lismore, New South Wales, Australia
- Died: 16 November 1944 (aged 58); Lindfield, New South Wales, Australia
- Batting: Right-handed
- Bowling: Right-arm fast-medium

International information
- National side: Australia
- Test debut (cap 96): 9 December 1910 v South Africa
- Last Test: 30 November 1928 v England

Career statistics
Competition	Test	First-class
Matches	26	132
Runs scored	1,422	6,389
Batting average	37.42	35.10
100s/50s	3/6	15/28
Top score	147	168
Balls bowled	4,363	21,527
Wickets	52	339
Bowling average	32.36	26.33
5 wickets in innings	1	10
10 wickets in match	0	1
Best bowling	5/33	7/35
Catches/stumpings	24/–	102/–
- Source: CricketArchive, 22 August 2025

Charles Kelleway (25 April 1886 – 16 November 1944) was an Australian cricketer who played in 26 Test matches between 1910 and 1928.

In 1911/12, he played against the MCC touring-team captained by Plum Warner. In the Test-series, he took a total of only 6 wickets at 41.50. However, in the Triangular tournament of 1912 in England, he was more successful and made 360 runs in Australia's six Tests, with 114 at Manchester and 102 at Lord's, both against South Africa. He also had the best bowling of 5/33 in an innings.

He served as a captain in the Australian Army during World War I. Stationed in England at the end of the war, he was chosen to lead the Australian Imperial Force Touring XI that toured Great Britain in 1919. The team had played six matches to the end of May, when there was a dispute that was ostensibly about the fixtures. In fact, the issue concerned Kelleway personally, as the AIF Sports Control Board dismissed him from the team because of "poor behaviour".

Kelleway died in 1944 after a long illness in Lindfield, New South Wales.

== Sources ==
- Harte, Chris (1993). A History of Australian Cricket. Andre Deutsch. ISBN 978-0-2339-8825-2.
