= Bert Oldfield =

Australian cricketer (1894–1976)

Bert Oldfield MBE
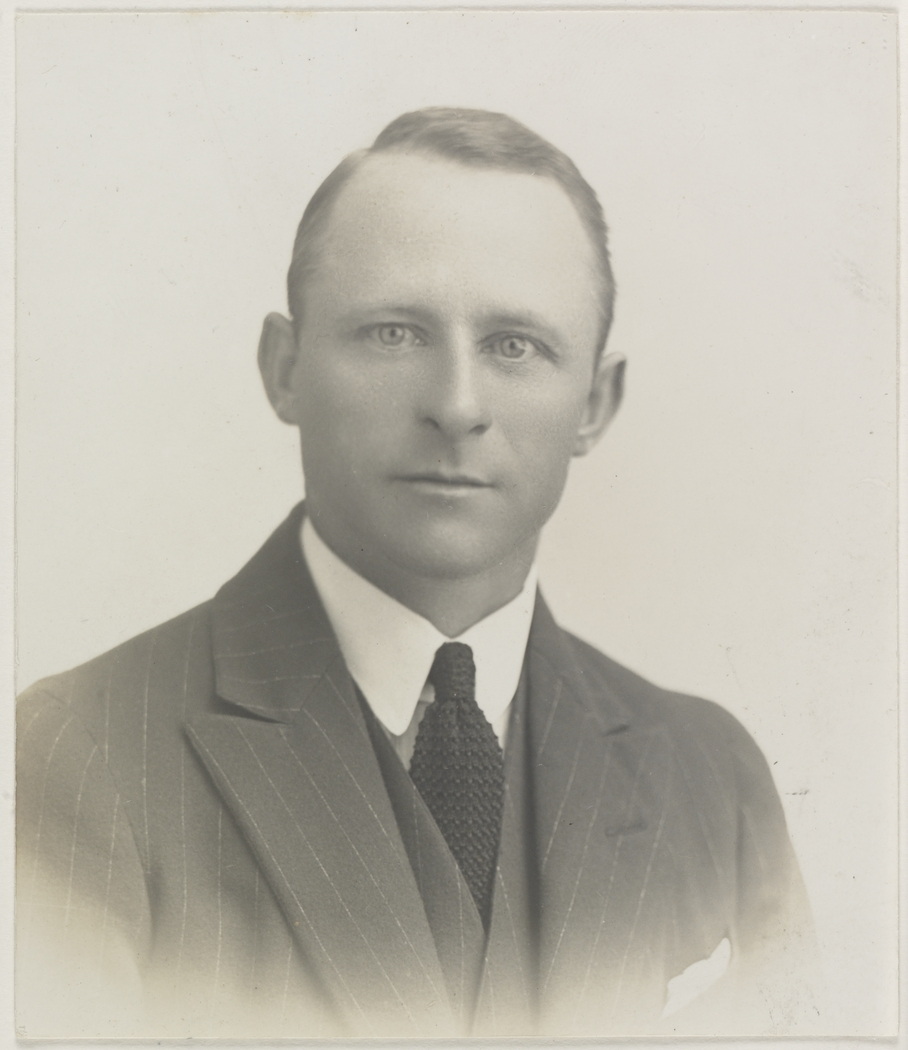
- Oldfield c. 1925

Personal information
- Full name: William Albert Stanley Oldfield
- Born: 9 September 1894; Alexandria, New South Wales, Australia
- Died: 10 August 1976 (aged 81); Killara, New South Wales, Australia
- Batting: Right-handed
- Role: Wicket-keeper

International information
- National side: Australia
- Test debut (cap 109): 17 December 1920 v England
- Last Test: 3 March 1937 v England

Domestic team information
- Years: Team
- 1919–1938: New South Wales

Career statistics
Competition	Test	First-class
Matches	54	245
Runs scored	1,427	6,135
Batting average	22.65	23.77
100s/50s	0/4	6/21
Top score	65*	137
Balls bowled	0	0
Wickets	–	–
Bowling average	–	–
5 wickets in innings	–	–
10 wickets in match	–	–
Best bowling	–	–
Catches/stumpings	78/52	399/263
- Source: Cricinfo, 29 September 2009
- Military career
- Allegiance: Australia
- Branch: Australian Army
- Rank: Corporal
- Unit: 15th Field Ambulance (AIF)
- Conflicts: World War I; Western Front; Ypres Salient

William Albert Stanley Oldfield MBE (9 September 1894 – 10 August 1976) was an Australian cricketer and businessman. He played for New South Wales and Australia as a wicket-keeper. Oldfield's 52 stumpings during his Test career remains a record several decades after his final Test.

== Early life ==
Oldfield was born in Alexandria, a suburb of Sydney, the seventh and youngest child of John William Oldfield, an upholsterer born in Manchester and his Australian wife Mary Gregory.

== Military service ==
During World War I, Oldfield served with the army in the first Australian Imperial Force as a Corporal in the 15th Field Ambulance. He was wounded and knocked unconscious at Ypres Salient in 1917, and spent six months recovering from shell shock. At the conclusion of the war, he was selected to be part of the Australian Imperial Forces cricket team, which played 28 first-class matches in Britain, South Africa, and Australia between May 1919 and February 1920.

== Career ==
Oldfield made his first-class debut in England in 1919, and played his first Test match against England in his hometown of Sydney in the 1920–21 season. In 1921, it was reported that he entered into negotiations to play for Lancashire as an amateur. He had injured himself on the passage to the UK in 1921, giving Carter the chance to restore his position, although Oldfield replaced him for the last two Tests. He was dropped for several matches over the next few years, but established himself as Australia's automatic selection for wicket-keeper in the 1924–25 Ashes series against England.

He missed only one other Test in his career, the fourth Test of the 1932–33 Bodyline series. In the notorious third Test at Adelaide, the English Bodyline tactic of bowling fast balls directed at the Australian batsmen's bodies reached its most dramatic moment when a ball from fast bowler Harold Larwood hit Oldfield in the head, fracturing his skull (although this was from a top edge off a traditional non-Bodyline ball and Oldfield admitted it was his fault). Oldfield was carried from the ground unconscious. He recovered in time for the fifth Test of the series. Always an easy-going personality, Oldfield immediately forgave Larwood for the incident, and the two eventually became firm friends when Larwood later emigrated to Australia. Oldfield played Test cricket for four more years, ending his career in 1937. He was named a Wisden Cricketer of the Year for 1927.

Oldfield played 54 Tests for Australia, scoring 1,427 runs at an average of 22.65, and taking 78 catches and 52 stumpings. His tally of 52 stumpings remains a Test career world record; 28 were off Clarrie Grimmett alone. In first-class cricket he played 245 matches, scoring 6,135 runs at an average of 23.77, and taking 399 catches and 263 stumpings.

After retiring from cricket, he coached, taking several schoolboys teams on overseas tours. In 1964, he spent a month coaching cricketers in Ethiopia, and met Haile Selassie. He was awarded an MBE in 1970.

== Death and legacy ==
Oldfield died in Killara, Sydney, on 10 August 1976.

In 1988, a public school in Seven Hills, New South Wales was renamed as Bert Oldfield Public School to commemorate his life. A cricket oval in the Sydney suburb of Killara, where he lived later in life, is named in Oldfield's honour.

== Gallery ==
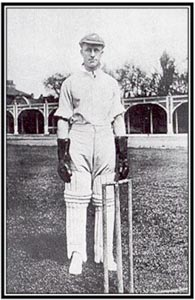
Portrait of Bert Oldfield

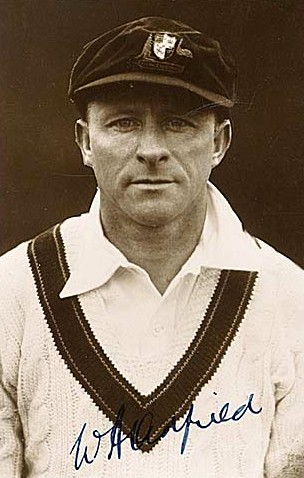
Portrait of Bert Oldfield, 1930.

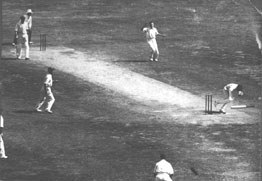
A ball from Harold Larwood hits Bert Oldfield in the head.

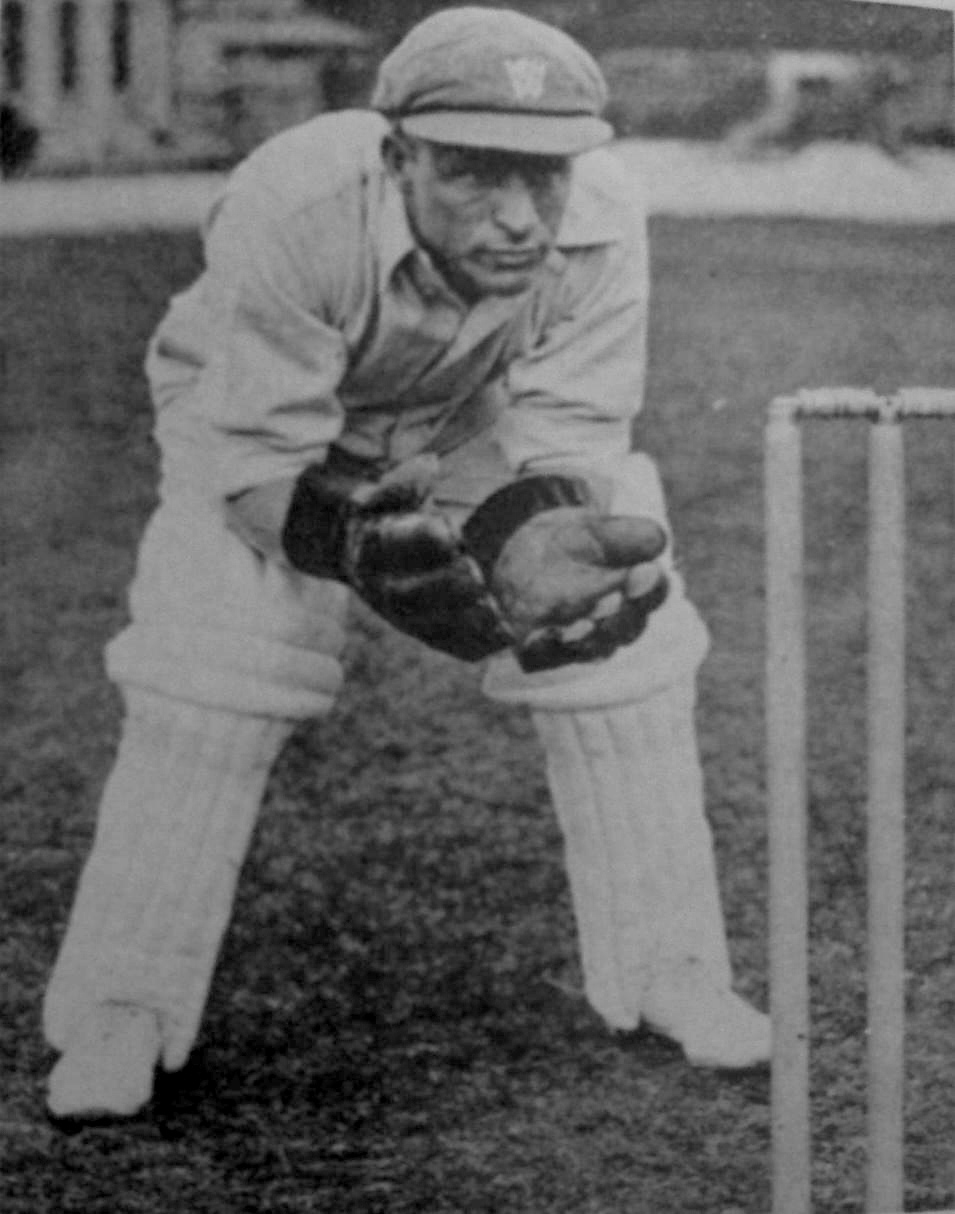
Bert Oldfield wicketkeeping

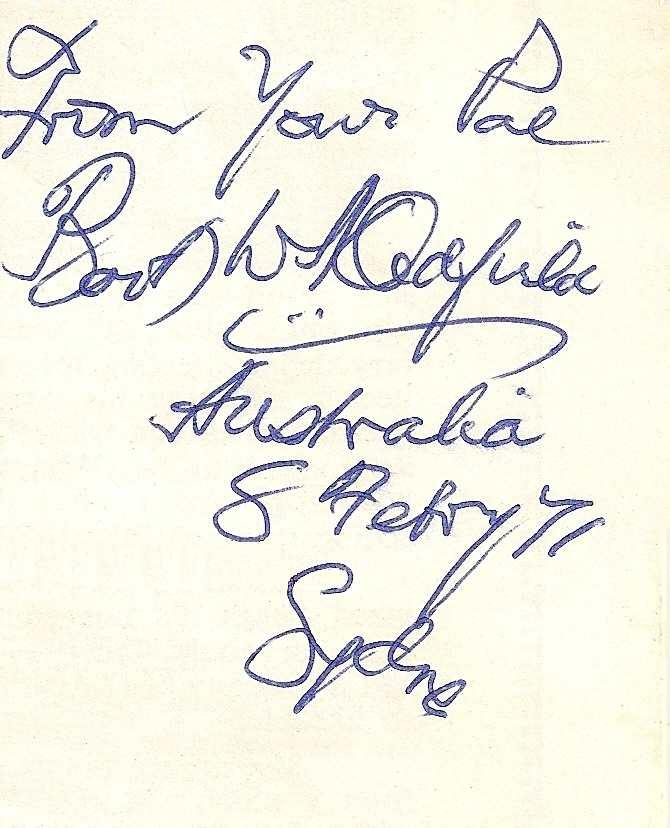
Autograph written at Bert Oldfield's Sports Store in 243 Pitt Street, Sydney

== See also ==
- List of New South Wales representative cricketers
