= List of International cricket families =

List of International cricket families is a list of people grouped by family who are associated with Test, One Day International or Twenty20 International cricket.

== Afghanistan ==
=== Malik/Abid/Sadiq/Alam ===
- Taj Malik
- Hasti Gul
- Karim Sadiq
- Aftab Alam
- Ismat Alam

Taj, Hasti, Karim and Aftab are brothers. Taj was the first coach of Afghanistan national team, while the others played international cricket. Ismat is Taj Malik's son

=== Afghan/Janat/Salamkheil ===
- Asghar Afghan
- Karim Janat
- Waqar Salamkheil

Asghar and Karim are brothers. Waqar is Asghar's nephew.

=== Ashraf ===
- Mirwais Ashraf
- Sharafuddin Ashraf

Sharafuddin is Mirwais's nephew.

=== Ahmedzai/Jamal ===
- Raees Ahmadzai
- Nasir Jamal

Raees and Nasir are brothers.

=== Mangal ===
- Nowroz Mangal
- Ihsanullah

Nowroz and Ihsanullah are brothers.

=== Zadran ===
- Noor Ali Zadran
- Mujeeb ur Rahman
- Ibrahim Zadran

Ibrahim and Mujeeb are cousins. They are the nephews of Noor Ali.

== Australia ==
=== Agar ===
- Ashton Agar
- Wes Agar

Ashton and Wes are brothers.

=== Alderman/Emerson ===
- Terry Alderman
- Denise Emerson
- Ross Emerson

Alderman's sister Denise Emerson is married to former Test umpire Ross Emerson and she herself played seven Tests for the Australian women's cricket team.

=== Archer ===
- Ken Archer
- Ron Archer

Ken and Ron were brothers.

=== Bannerman ===
- Alec Bannerman
- Charles Bannerman

Alec and Charles were brothers.

=== Benaud ===
- Richie Benaud (captain)
- John Benaud

Richie and John are brothers.

=== Blackwell ===
- Alex Blackwell
- Kate Blackwell
- Lynsey Askew (England)

Alex and Kate are twin sisters, and Lynsey is Alex's wife

=== Campbell/Ponting ===
- Greg Campbell
- Ricky Ponting (captain)
- Ben Hilfenhaus

Ponting is the nephew of Campbell. Hilfenhaus is the second cousin of Ponting.

=== Chappell/Richardson ===
- Vic Richardson (captain)
- Ian Chappell (captain)
- Greg Chappell (captain)
- Trevor Chappell

Ian, Greg and Trevor Chappell are brothers and Vic Richardson's grandsons

=== Cooper ===
- WillIam Cooper
- Paul Sheahan

Paul is the great-grandson of William.

=== Darling ===
- Joe Darling (captain)
- Rick Darling

Rick is Joe's great-nephew.

=== Giffen ===
- George Giffen
- Walter Giffen

George and Walter are brothers.

=== Gregory ===
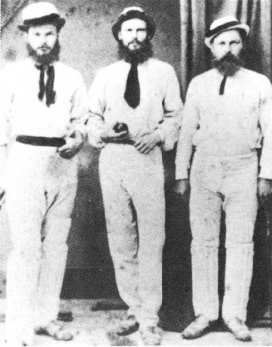
Charles, Dave and Ned Gregory

- Arthur Gregory
- Charles Smith Gregory
- Charles William Gregory
- Dave Gregory (captain)
- Harry Donnan
- Jack Gregory
- Louisa Caroline Gregory
- Ned Gregory
- Syd Gregory (captain)

Dave and Ned were brothers in a family of 6 cricketing brothers. Dave and Ned made their Test debut in the same match, the first recognised Test match (played in 1877 between Australia and England in Melbourne). Syd was Ned's son, and Harry Donnan was Ned's son-in-law. Jack was Dave and Ned's nephew. Nellie and Louisa Gregory were pioneering sisters (Ned's daughters) in term of the women's cricket game in Australia.

=== Harvey ===
- Neil Harvey
- Merv Harvey
- Mick Harvey

Neil and Merv were brothers. Another brother, Mick was a Test umpire.

=== Haynes/Poulton ===
- Rachael Haynes
- Leah Poulton

Haynes and Poulton married each other.

=== Healy/Starc ===
- Ian Healy
- Alyssa Healy
- Mitchell Starc

Alyssa is Ian's niece. Ian was the wicketkeeper for the Australian men's team. Alyssa, the former wicketkeeper for the Australian women's team, is married to Australian fast bowler Mitchell Starc; they are the third couple to have both played Test cricket.

=== Hilditch/Simpson ===
- Andrew Hilditch
- Bob Simpson

Andrew is the son in law of Bob.

=== Hussey ===
- Michael Hussey
- David Hussey

Michael is David's elder brother.

=== Johnson/Park ===
- Ian Johnson
- Roy Park

Ian is the son in law of Roy.

=== Laughlin ===
- Trevor Laughlin
- Ben Laughlin

Ben is the son of Trevor.

=== Lee ===
- Brett Lee
- Shane Lee

Brett and Shane are brothers.

=== Lehmann/White ===
- Darren Lehmann
- Craig White (England)

Darren and Craig are brothers-in-law; Darren is married to Craig's sister Andrea. Darren's son Jake currently plays domestic cricket in Australia.

=== Marsh ===
- Geoff Marsh
- Shaun Marsh
- Mitchell Marsh

Geoff is the father of Shaun and Mitchell.

=== McDermott ===
- Ben McDermott
- Craig McDermott

Ben is the son of Craig. Ben's brother Alister plays domestic cricket in Australia.

=== McLeod ===
- Bob McLeod
- Charlie McLeod

Bob and Charlie are brothers.

=== Pattinson ===
- Darren Pattinson
- James Pattinson

Darren and James are brothers, Darren has represented England in tests, James has represented Australia in Tests and ODIs.

=== Shevill/Blade ===
- Essie Shevill
- Fernie Blade (née Shevill)
- Rene Shevill

All were sisters. Another sister Lily played for the New South Wales women's cricket team. Essie and Lily were twins born 6 April 1908.

=== Sutherland ===
- Annabel Sutherland
- James Sutherland
- Will Sutherland

Annabel and Will played international cricket while her father James was the chief executive of Australian Cricket Board.

=== Tredrea ===
- Janette Tredrea
- Sharon Tredrea

Janette and Sharon are sisters.

=== Trott ===
- Albert Trott
- Harry Trott

Albert and Harry were brothers.

=== Trumble ===
- Hugh Trumble
- Billy Trumble

Hugh and Billy were brothers.

=== Valetta ===
- Mike Valetta
- Graeme Wood

Mike is the brother-in-law of Graeme.

=== Waugh ===
- Mark Waugh
- Steve Waugh (captain)

Mark and Steve are fraternal twin brothers. Another brother Dean played at the domestic level. Austin, the son of Steve has played for the Australia national Under-19 team.

== Austria ==
=== Avdylaj ===
- Valentina Avdylaj
- Rezerta Avdylaj

Valentina and Rezarta are sisters.

== Bangladesh ==
=== Abedin ===
- Minhajul Abedin
- Nurul Abedin

Minhajul and Nurul are brothers.

=== Iqbal/Khan ===
- Akram Khan
- Nafees Iqbal
- Tamim Iqbal

Nafees and Tamim are brothers and the nephews of Akram.

=== Mahmudullah/Rahim ===
- Mushfiqur Rahim
- Mohammad Mahmudullah

Mushfiqur Rahim and Mohammad Mahmudullah are double brothers-in-law.

== Bermuda ==
=== Bascome ===
- Oronde Bascome
- Onias Bascome
- Okera Bascome

All three are brothers. The father of these brothers Herbert Bascome played List-A cricket for Bermuda, including the 2001 ICC Trophy.

=== Leverock/Greenidge ===
- Dwayne Leverock
- Kamau Leverock
- Alvin Greenidge

Dwayne and Alvin are the uncles of Kamau. Alvin played international cricket for the West Indies.

== Canada ==
=== Mulla ===
- Asif Mulla
- Mohsin Mulla

Asif and Mohsin are brothers.

== Cook Islands ==
=== Dickson ===
- Cory Dickson
- Hayden Dickson

Cory and Hayden are brothers.

=== Parima ===
- Aue Parima
- Tom Parima

Aue and Tom are brothers.

== Croatia ==
=== Vukusic ===
- Erin Vukusic
- Zach Vukusic

Erin and Zach are siblings.

== Cyprus ==
=== Senn ===
- Adam Senn
- Alexander Senn

Adam and Alexander are brothers.

== Denmark ==
=== Neilsen ===
- Inger Neilsen
- Susanne Neilsen

Inger and Susanne are sisters.

== England ==
=== Adams ===
- Chris Adams
- Georgia Adams

Georgia is the daughter of Chris.

=== Ali ===
- Moeen Ali
- Kabir Ali

Moeen and Kabir are cousins.

=== Atherton ===
- Michael Atherton
- Frank de Caires

Josh de Caires Son of Michael

Frank de Caires who played Test cricket for West Indies, has a granddaughter Isabelle who married to Atherton.

=== Bairstow ===
- David Bairstow
- Andrew Bairstow
- Jonny Bairstow

Jonny is the son of David. Jonny's brother Andrew has also played at the domestic level.

=== Ball/French ===
- Jake Ball
- Bruce French

Ball is the nephew of French.

=== Broad ===
- Chris Broad
- Stuart Broad

Stuart is the son of Chris.

=== Brunt/Sciver ===
- Katherine Brunt
- Natalie Sciver

Brunt and Sciver announced their engagement in October 2019 and were married on 30 May 2022.

=== Butcher ===
- Alan Butcher
- Mark Butcher (captain)

Mark is the son of Alan.

=== Christiani ===
- Cyril Christiani
- Robert Christiani

Cyril and Robert are brothers. Two more brothers Harry and Ernest played first-class cricket for British Guiana.

=== Compton ===
- Denis Compton
- Nick Compton

Nick is the grandson of Denis.

Other relatives have also played first-class cricket:

- Brother Leslie
- Second son Richard
- Third son Patrick
- Grandson Ben

=== Cowdrey ===
- Colin Cowdrey (captain)
- Chris Cowdrey (captain)
- Graham Cowdrey

Chris and Graham are the sons of Colin. Chris's son Fabian also played first-class cricket for Kent.

=== Curran ===
- Kevin Curran (Zimbabwe)
- Tom Curran (England)
- Ben Curran (Zimbabwe)
- Sam Curran (England)

Tom, Ben, and Sam are the sons of Kevin, who represented Zimbabwe in international cricket.

Kevin Patrick Curran (father to Kevin Malcolm) also played for Rhodesia.

=== Duleepsinhji/Indrajitsinhji/Ranjitsinhji/Singh ===
- Kumar Shri Ranjitsinhji
- KS Duleepsinhji
- Ajay Jadeja
- Hanumant Singh
- Indrajitsinhji

Duleepsinhji and Hanumant, were the nephews of Ranjitsinhji. Jadeja is the great-grandnephew of Duleepsinhji. Indrajitsinhji was a cousin of Hanumant. Ajay, Hanumant and Indrajitsinhji have all played for India.

=== Ealham ===
- Alan Ealham
- Mark Ealham

Father and son. Alan captained Kent and was twice 12th man for England in 1977. Alan's son Mark played for Kent, Nottinghamshire and England.

=== Edrich ===
- Bill Edrich
- John Edrich

Bill and John were cousins. Brian Edrich, Eric Edrich and Geoff Edrich were brothers of Bill, who also played first-class cricket.

=== Gilligan/May ===
- Arthur Gilligan (captain)
- Harold Gilligan (captain)
- Peter May (captain)

Arthur and Harold were brothers. May was the son-in-law of Harold.

=== Grace ===
- W. G. Grace (captain)
- E. M. Grace
- G. F. Grace

All were brothers, from a large family of cricketers. All three brothers played in the same match against Australia at The Oval in 1880.

=== Greig ===
- Tony Greig (captain)
- Ian Greig

Tony and Ian were brothers.

=== Gunn ===
- Billy Gunn
- John Gunn
- George Gunn

George and John were brothers, and subsequently, nephews of Billy. George's son G.V. Gunn played for Nottinghamshire.

=== Haddelsay ===
- Joyce Haddelsay
- Muriel Haddelsay

Joyce and Muriel are sisters.

=== Hardstaff ===
- Joe Hardstaff senior
- Joe Hardstaff junior

=== Harris/Haig ===
- Lord Harris
- Nigel Haig

Nigel is the nephew of Harris.

=== Harris/Kimmince ===
- Grace Harris
- Laura Harris
- Delissa Kimmince

Grace and Laura are sisters. Laura and Delissa married each other.

=== Hearne ===
- Frank Hearne
- Alec Hearne
- George Gibbons Hearne
- John Thomas Hearne

Frank, George and Alec were brothers, and John was their cousin, from a large family of cricketers.

Frank Hearne played Test cricket for England against South Africa and later, having settled in South Africa, for South Africa against England. In the Cape Town Test of 1891–92, Frank played for South Africa while his two brothers and cousin were playing for England. Frank's son, George, also played for South Africa.

=== Hollioake ===
- Adam Hollioake (captain)
- Ben Hollioake

Brothers Adam and Ben both made their Test debut for England in the 5th Test of the 1997 Ashes series, becoming only the third set of brothers to make their Test debut in the same match. They played 4 and 2 Tests respectively, as well as 35 and 20 ODIs respectively in their international careers.

=== Hutton ===
- Sir Leonard Hutton (captain)
- Richard Hutton

Sir Leonard was Richard's father.

=== Konstas ===
- Billy Konstas
- Sam Konstas

Billy is the brother of Sam. Billy represented Greece in international cricket.

=== Jones ===
- Jeff Jones
- Simon Jones

Jeff is Simon's father.

=== Langridge ===
- James Langridge
- John Langridge

James and John are brothers. While James played international cricket, John was an international umpire.

=== Lloyd ===
- David Lloyd
- Graham Lloyd

Graham was the son of David.

=== Mann ===
- Frank Mann (captain)
- George Mann (captain)

George was the son of Frank. Simon, the former British Army officer and mercenary, was the son of George.

=== Overton ===
- Craig Overton
- Jamie Overton

Craig and Jamie are identical twin brothers.

=== Parks ===
- Jim Parks, Sr.
- Jim Parks, Jr.

=== Pattinson ===
- Darren Pattinson
- James Pattinson

Darren and James are brothers, Darren has represented England in tests, James has represented Australia in tests and ODIs.

=== Powell ===
- Jane Powell
- Jill Powell

Jane and Jill are twin sisters.

=== Prideaux/Westbrook ===
- Roger Prideaux
- Ruth Westbrook

Ruth is married to Roger.

=== Pringle ===
- Don Pringle
- Derek Pringle

Don was the father of Derek. Don played for East Africa in the 1975 World Cup.

=== Richardson ===
- Peter Richardson
- Dick Richardson

Peter is the older brother of Dick.

=== Roy/Snater ===
- Jason Roy
- Shane Snater

Jason and Shane are cousins. Shane played international cricket for Netherlands.

=== Sidebottom ===
- Arnie Sidebottom
- Ryan Sidebottom

Arnie is the father of Ryan.

=== Smith ===
- Chris Smith
- Robin Smith

Chris is the older brother of Robin.

=== Smith ===
- Mike Smith (captain)
- Neil Smith

Mike is the father of Neil.

=== Stewart/Butcher ===
- Alec Stewart
- Mickey Stewart
- Mark Butcher

Alec is the son and Mark is the son-in-law of Mickey. Alec and Mark were brothers-in-law. At one time in their respective playing careers. Butcher was married to Mickey's daughter Judy.

=== Studd ===
- George Studd
- Charles Studd

George was the older brother of Charles.

=== Tate ===
- Fred Tate
- Maurice Tate

Maurice was the son of Fred.

=== Townsend ===
- Charlie Townsend
- David Townsend

David was the son of Charlie.

=== Tremlett ===
- Maurice Tremlett
- Chris Tremlett

Chris is Maurice's grandson.

=== Tyldesley/Vaughan ===
- Ernest Tyldesley
- Johnny Tyldesley
- Michael Vaughan (captain)

Ernest and Johnny were brothers. Michael is the great-grandson of one of the sisters of Johnny and Ernest.

=== Valentine ===
- Bryan Valentine
- Carol Valentine

Carol is the sister of Bryan.

=== White/Lehmann ===
- Darren Lehmann (Australia)
- Craig White

Darren and Craig are brothers-in-law, Darren is married to Craig's sister Andrea.

=== Willey ===
- Peter Willey
- David Willey

David is the son of Peter.

=== Wilson ===
- Clem Wilson
- Rockley Wilson

Clem was the older brother of Rockley.

=== Wright ===
- Luke Wright
- Ashley Wright

Luke and Ashley are brothers. Ashley plays international cricket for Guernsey.

== Eswatini ==
=== Mkhatshwa ===
- Ntombizodwa Mkhatshwa
- Ntombizonke Mkhatshwa

Both are twin sisters.

== France ==
=== Mangal ===
- Rahmatullah Mangal
- Rohullah Mangal

Rahmatullah and Rohullah are brothers.

=== McKeon ===
- Gustav McKeon
- Ines McKeon

Gustav and Ines are siblings.

== Gibraltar ==
=== Raikes ===
- Michael Raikes
- Phillip Raikes

Michael and Phillip are brothers.

=== Nightingale ===
- Tom Nightingale
- Ollie Nightingale

Tom and Ollie are brothers.

=== Stokes ===
- Anthony Stokes
- Matthew Stokes

Anthony and Matthew are brothers.

== Hong Kong ==
=== Ahmed ===
- Irfan Ahmed
- Nadeem Ahmed

Irfan and Nadeem are brothers.

=== Ahmed/Nawaz ===
- Tanveer Ahmed
- Ehsan Nawaz

Tanvir and Ehsan are brothers.

== India ==
=== Ali ===
- Wazir Ali
- Nazir Ali

Wazir Ali and Nazir Ali were brothers. They both made their Test debut in India's inaugural Test match, against England at Lord's in 1932. Wazir Ali's son, Khalid Wazir played Test cricket for Pakistan.

=== Amarnath ===
- Lala Amarnath
- Surinder Amarnath
- Mohinder Amarnath
- Rajinder Amarnath
- Digvijay Amarnath

Surinder, Mohinder and Rajinder are sons of Lala Amarnath while Digvijay is son of Surinder Amarnath and grandson of Lala Amarnath

=== Amar Singh/Ladha Ramji ===
- Amar Singh
- Ladha Ramji

They were brothers.

=== Apte ===
- Madhav Apte
- Arvind Apte

The Aptes were brothers.

=== Binny ===
- Roger Binny
- Stuart Binny

Stuart is son of Roger.

=== Chahar ===
- Rahul Chahar
- Deepak Chahar

Rahul and Deepak Chahar are double cousins.

=== Dhawan ===
- Rishi Dhawan
- Raghav Dhawan

Rishi and Raghav are brothers. Raghav plays international cricket for Uganda.

=== Edulji ===
- Diana Edulji
- Behroze Edulji

Diana and Behroze are sisters.

=== Gaekwad ===
- Datta Gaekwad
- Anshuman Gaekwad
- Shatrunjay Gaekwad

Shatrunjay is the son of Anshuman, who is the son of Datta.

=== Gupte ===
- Subhash Gupte
- Baloo Gupte

Subhash was the elder brother of Baloo.

=== Hindlekar/Manjrekar ===
- Dattaram Hindlekar
- Vijay Manjrekar
- Sanjay Manjrekar

Vijay Manjrekar was the father of Sanjay and the nephew of Hindlekar.

=== Kanitkar ===
- Hemant Kanitkar
- Hrishikesh Kanitkar

Hrishikesh is the son of Hemant.

=== Karthik/Itticheria ===
- Susan Itticheria
- Dinesh Karthik

Susan Itticheria played Tests and ODI for Indian Women's Team. Her daughter Dipika Pallikal Karthik an Indian squash champion is married to Dinesh Karthik.

=== Khan/Jilani ===
- Jahangir Khan
- Baqa Jilani

They were brothers in law. See also #Burki/Khan/Niazi.

=== Kirmani/Abid Ali ===
- Syed Kirmani
- Syed Abid Ali

Kirmani's daughter married Abid Ali's son in 2002, but he died in 2008.

=== Mankad ===
- Vinoo Mankad
- Ashok Mankad

Vinoo was the father of Ashok. Rahul Mankad, another son of Vinoo, was a first-class cricketer.

=== Mantri/Gavaskar/Viswanath ===
- Madhav Mantri
- Sunil Gavaskar
- Rohan Gavaskar
- Gundappa Viswanath

Sunil Gavaskar is Rohan's father and Mantri's nephew. Viswanath is married to Sunil Gavaskar's sister Kavita.

=== Menon ===
- Narendra Menon
- Nitin Menon

Narendra is the father of Nitin. Both are umpires.

=== Nayudu ===
- C. K. Nayudu
- C. S. Nayudu

C. K. was the elder brother of C. S.

=== Pandya ===
- Krunal Pandya
- Hardik Pandya

Krunal is the elder brother of Hardik.

=== Pataudi ===
- Iftikhar Ali Khan, Nawab of Pataudi, senior (captain)
- Mansur Ali Khan, Nawab of Pataudi, junior (captain)

Iftikhar was Mansur's father. Iftikhar played three Tests for England, before captaining the Indian team that toured England in 1946.

=== Pathan ===
- Irfan Pathan
- Yusuf Pathan

Irfan and Yusuf are brothers. Yusuf is elder to Irfan.

=== Roy ===
- Pankaj Roy
- Pranab Roy
- Ambar Roy

Pankaj was the father of Pranab and the uncle of Ambar

=== Rathour/Kapoor ===
- Vikram Rathour
- Aashish Kapoor

Brothers in law

=== Sharma ===
- Yashpal Sharma
- Chetan Sharma

Yashpal is the uncle of Chetan.

=== Singh ===
- A. G. Ram Singh
- A. G. Kripal Singh
- A. G. Milkha Singh
- Arjan Kripal Singh

Ram Singh was the father of Kripal Singh and Milkha Singh, Arjan is the son of Kripal Singh.

=== Singh ===
- Yograj Singh
- Yuvraj Singh

Yograj Singh is the father of Yuvraj.

=== Tendulkar ===
- Sachin Tendulkar
- Arjun Tendulkar

Arjun Tendulkar, son of Sachin Tendulkar, is a first-class cricketer.

== Ireland ==
=== Adair ===
- Mark Adair
- Ross Adair

Mark and Ross are brothers.

=== Delany ===
- Laura Delany (captain)
- Gareth Delany
- David Delany

Laura and Gareth are siblings. David is their cousin.

=== Garth ===
- Anne-Marie Garth
- Kim Garth

Anne-Marie is the mother of Kim. Her husband Jonathan Garth has played for Ireland at first-class and List-A level, whose son with the same name Jonathan Garth has also played domestic cricket.

=== Joyce/Anderson ===
- Dominick Joyce
- Ed Joyce
- Cecelia Joyce (captain)
- Isobel Joyce (captain)
- John Anderson

All are siblings who have played Test and/or ODI cricket in the Irish men's and women's cricket teams. Dominick and Ed made their debuts for opposite teams, Ireland and England respectively. Another brother, Gus, played first-class cricket for Ireland. Isobel and Cecelia are twin sisters. Isobel married John, who played international cricket for Ireland.

=== Kenealy ===
- Amy Kenealy
- Suzanne Kenealy

Amy and Suzanne are sisters.

=== Lewis ===
- Gaby Lewis
- Robyn Lewis

Gaby and Robyn are sisters. Their father Alan and grandfather Ian have also played first-class cricket for Ireland.

=== Little ===
- Josh Little
- Hannah Little
- Louise Little

Hannah and Louise are the sisters of Josh.

=== Maguire ===
- Aimee Maguire
- Jane Maguire

Aimee and Jane are sisters.

=== McCarthy ===
- Barry McCarthy
- Louise McCarthy

Louise is the sister of Barry.

=== Mooney ===
- John Mooney
- Paul Mooney

John and Paul are brothers

=== O'Brien ===
- Kevin O'Brien (captain)
- Niall O'Brien

Kevin and Niall are brothers and played together in the 2007, 2011 and 2015 Cricket World Cups.

=== Poynter ===
- Andrew Poynter
- Stuart Poynter

Andrew and Stuart are brothers

=== Rankin ===
- Boyd Rankin
- David Rankin

Boyd and David are brothers. Boyd has also played international cricket for England.

=== Tector ===
- Harry Tector
- Tim Tector
- Alice Tector

Harry, Tim and Alice are siblings.

== Italy ==
=== Manenti ===
- Ben Manenti
- Harry John Manenti

Ben and Harry are brothers.

=== Mosca ===
- Anthony Mosca
- Justin Mosca

Anthony and Justin are brothers.

== Japan ==
=== Kadowaki-Fleming ===
- Kendel Kadowaki-Fleming
- Alester Kadowaki-Fleming

Kendel and Alester are brothers.

=== Kato Stafford ===
- Ayaka Kato Stafford
- Kazuma Kato Stafford

Ayaka and Kazuma are siblings.

=== Yamamoto-Lake ===
- Kiefer Yamamoto-Lake
- Lachlan Yamamoto-Lake

Kiefer and Lachlan are brothers.

== Jersey ==
=== Tribe ===
- Asa Tribe
- Zak Tribe

Asa and Zak are brothers.

== Kenya ==
Sharma

- Pushkar Sharma
- Sita Sharma

Sita Sharma is married to Pushkar Sharma, and their wedding took place on December 7, 2023. Pushkar is currently playing for Kenya.

=== Karim ===
- Aasif Karim
- Irfan Karim

Aasif is the father of Irfan.

=== Modi ===
- Subhash Modi
- Hitesh Modi

Hitesh who is an umpire, is the father of Subhash.

=== Odhiambo/Odoyo ===
- Thomas Odoyo
- Nelson Odhiambo

Thomas Odoyo is the uncle of Nelson Odhiambo

=== Odhiambo/Onyango/Ngoche ===
- Nehemiah Odhiambo
- Lameck Onyango
- James Ngoche
- Shem Ngoche
- Margaret Banja

Nehemiah, Lameck, James and Shem are brothers. Their sisters Margaret Banja and Mary Bele have also represented Kenya. Margaret has also been an umpire in official Women's Twenty20 Internationals.

=== Obuya/Otieno ===
- Collins Obuya
- David Obuya
- Kennedy Otieno

All three are brothers.

=== Odumbe ===
- Edward Odumbe
- Maurice Odumbe

Edward and Maurice are brothers.

=== Suji ===
- Tony Suji
- Martin Suji

Tony and Martin are brothers.

=== Tikolo ===
- David Tikolo
- Steve Tikolo

Tom Tikolo, elder brother of David and Steve, played first-class cricket for Kenya.

== Luxembourg ==
=== Barker ===
- James Barker
- Timothy Barker

James and Timothy are twin brothers.

== Malawi ==
=== Kansonkho ===
- Donnex Kansonkho
- Gift Kansonkho

Donnex and Gift are brothers.

== Malaysia ==
=== Azmi ===
- Sasha Azmi
- Zumika Azmi

Sasha and Zumika are sisters.

=== Singh ===
- Pavandeep Singh
- Virandeep Singh

Pavandeep and Virandeep are brothers.

== Namibia ==
=== Burger ===
- Louis Burger
- Sarel Burger

Brothers. (Unrelated to Jan-Berrie Burger, despite the name.)

=== Green ===
- Zane Green
- Kayleen Green

Zane & Kayleen are brother and sister

=== Kotze ===
- Bjorn Kotze
- Deon Kotze

Bjorn and Deon are brothers

== Nepal ==
=== Sheikh ===
- Aarif Sheikh
- Aasif Sheikh

Aarif and Aasif are brothers.

== Netherlands ==
=== Ahmad ===
- Musa Ahmad
- Shariz Ahmad

Musa and Shariz are brothers.

=== Cooper ===
- Tom Cooper
- Ben Cooper

Tom and Ben are brothers.

=== de Leede ===
- Bas de Leede
- Tim de Leede
- Babette de Leede
- Frans de Leede

Bas is the son of Tim and a cousin of Babette. Frans, the father of Tim, had umpired in Women's ODIs.

=== Hemmings/Morgan ===
- Eddie Hemmings
- Beth Morgan

Beth is the niece of Eddie.

=== Jonkman ===
- Mark Jonkman
- Maurits Jonkman

Mark and Maurits are identical twins.

=== Klein ===
- Kyle Klein
- Ryan Klein

Kyle and Ryan are brothers.

=== Mol ===
- Geert-Maarten Mol
- Hendrik-Jan Mol

Geert and Hendrik are brothers.

=== Rambaldo ===
- Caroline Rambaldo
- Helmien Rambaldo

Caroline and Helmien are sisters.

=== Seigers ===
- Heather Siegers (captain)
- Silver Siegers

Heather and Silver are sisters.

=== van Oosterom ===
- Robert van Oosterom
- Robyn van Oosterom

Robyn is the daughter of Robert.

=== Zulfiqar ===
- Sikander Zulfiqar
- Saqib Zulfiqar

Sikandar and Saqib are brothers. One more brother Asad played List-A cricket for Netherlands. In 2017, they became the first ever triplets to appear in the same professional match.

=== Zwilling ===
- Iris Zwilling
- Mikkie Zwilling

Iris and Mikkie are sisters.

== New Zealand ==
=== Anderson ===
- Robert Anderson
- Mac Anderson

William "Mac" Anderson was Robert's father.

=== Astle/McMillan ===
- Lisa Astle
- Nathan Astle
- Craig McMillan

Nathan is married to the sister of Craig's wife. Lisa is Nathan's sister.

NB: Todd Astle is unrelated.

=== Bailey/Hatcher ===
- Dot Bailey
- Joan Hatcher

Dot and Joan are sisters.

=== Bracewell ===
- Brendon Bracewell
- John Bracewell
- Doug Bracewell
- Michael Bracewell

Brendon and John Bracewell are brothers. Doug Bracewell is the son of Brendon Bracewell. Doug's cousin (Brendan and John's nephew) Michael also played for New Zealand.

=== Bradburn ===
- Wynne Bradburn
- Grant Bradburn

Grant was the son of Wynne.

=== Burgess ===
- Mark Burgess
- Gordon Burgess
- Thomas Burgess

Mark played for New Zealand while his father Gordon was a President of New Zealand Cricket Council. Thomas who is the great-uncle of Mark, umpired a Test match.

=== Brownlee ===
- Delwyn Brownlee
- Leonie Brownlee

Delwyn and Leonie are sisters. While Delwyn played, Leonie was an umpire in women's international cricket.

=== Buck/Ell ===
- Hilda Buck
- Agnes Ell

Hilda and Agnes are sisters in law.

=== Cairns ===
- Lance Cairns
- Chris Cairns

Chris is the son of Lance.

=== Cave ===
- Harry Cave
- Kenneth Cave

Harry is the nephew of Kenneth. While Harry played Tests, Kenneth was a Test umpire.

=== Cleaver/Williamson ===
- Dane Cleaver
- Kane Williamson

Dane is the cousin of Kane.

=== Crowe ===
- Jeff Crowe
- Martin Crowe (Captain)

Jeff and Martin are brothers, sons of first-class cricketer Dave Crowe

=== Franklin/Coulston ===
- James Franklin
- Jean Coulston

Jean is the aunt of James.

=== Hadlee ===
- Walter Hadlee
- Barry Hadlee
- Dayle Hadlee
- Richard Hadlee
- Karen Hadlee

Walter is the father of brothers Barry, Dayle and Richard. Karen, who played in one One-day International for the New Zealand women's cricket team against England in 1977-78 was married to Richard.

=== Harris ===
- Zin Harris
- Chris Harris

Parke "Zin" Harris is the father of Chris Harris. Chris's brother Ben also played domestic cricket for Canterbury.

=== Hart ===
- Matthew Hart
- Robbie Hart

Matthew is the older brother of Robbie.

=== Horne ===
- Matthew Horne
- Phil Horne

Matt and Phil Horne are brothers.

=== Howarth ===
- Geoffrey Howarth
- Hedley Howarth

Geoff and Hedley Howarth are brothers.

=== Kuggeleijn ===
- Chris Kuggeleijn
- Scott Kuggeleijn

Chris is the father of Scott.

=== Latham ===
- Rod Latham
- Tom Latham

Tom is the son of Rod.

=== Leggat ===
- Gordon Leggat
- Ian Leggat

Gordon and Ian are cousins.

=== Marshall ===
- Hamish Marshall
- James Marshall

Hamish and James are identical twins.

=== McCullum ===
- Brendon McCullum
- Nathan McCullum

Nathan is the older brother of Brendon. Their father Stu played domestic cricket

=== McGlashan ===
- Peter McGlashan
- Sara McGlashan

Sara is the younger sister of Peter.

=== Milburn ===
- Barry Milburn
- Rowan Milburn

Rowan is the daughter of Barry. She also played for the Netherlands. Despite the surname, England Test cricketer Colin Milburn is unrelated.

=== Murray/Kerr ===
- Bruce Murray
- Amelia Kerr
- Jess Kerr

Bruce is the grandfather of Amelia and Jess, whose father, Robbie Kerr, played first-class cricket in New Zealand.

=== Parker ===
- John Parker
- Murray Parker

John and Murray are brothers.

=== Pringle ===
- Chris Pringle
- Tim Pringle

Tim is the son of Chris. Tim currently plays for Netherlands.

=== Redmond ===
- Aaron Redmond
- Rodney Redmond

Rodney is Aaron's father

=== Reid ===
- John Reid (captain)
- Richard Reid

John is Richard's father.

=== Reid ===
- John Fulton Reid
- Bruce Reid

John Fulton and Bruce are cousins. Bruce played for Australia. New Zealand have two different players named "John Reid" are different and both Reid families are unrelated.

=== Rutherford ===
- Hamish Rutherford
- Ken Rutherford

Ken is Hamish's father. Ken's brother Ian also played first-class cricket.

=== Satterthwaite/Tahuhu ===
- Amy Satterthwaite
- Lea Tahuhu

Amy Satterthwaite and Lea Tahuhu have been married since March 2017. They became the first international teammates to marry and the first married couple to play together.

=== Signal ===
- Rose Signal
- Liz Signal

Rose and Liz are twin sisters and were the first instance of twins playing in the same Test: New Zealand women against England in 1984.

=== Snedden ===
- Colin Snedden
- Martin Snedden

Colin is Martin's uncle. Colin's father Warwick also played first-class cricket, as did Warwick and Colin's father Nessie and uncle, Cyril Snedden. Martin's son Michael has also played first-class cricket.

=== Stead ===
- Gary Stead
- Janice Stead

Gary is the nephew of Janice.

=== Tolchard/Twose ===
- Roger Tolchard
- Roger Twose

Tolchard is the uncle of Twose.

=== Turner ===
- Glenn Turner
- Alfred Turner

Alfred is the father of Glenn. While Glenn played Tests and ODIs, Alfred stood as an umpire in Women's ODIs.

=== Vivian ===
- Graham Vivian
- Giff Vivian

Giff was Graham's father.

=== Webb ===
- Murray Webb
- Richard Webb

Murray and Richard are brothers. Note: Murray Webb played only Tests; Richard played only One Day Internationals.

== Nigeria ==
=== Abdulquadri ===
- Kehinde Abdulquadri
- Taiwo Abdulquadri

Kehinde and Taiwo are twin sisters.

== Oman ==
- Adnan Ilyas
- Aqib Ilyas

Adnan and Aqib are brothers.

== Pakistan ==
=== Afridi ===
- Shaheen Afridi
- Riaz Afridi
- Shahid Afridi
- Irfan Afridi

Shaheen and Riaz are brothers. Shahid is the father-in-law of Shaheen. Irfan who plays for Uganda, is the nephew of Shahid.

=== Afridi ===
- Abbas Afridi
- Umar Gul

Abbas is the nephew of Gul.

=== Ahmed ===
- Saeed Ahmed
- Younis Ahmed

Saeed and Younis are brothers.

=== Ahmed/Ali ===
- Noman Ali
- Rizwan Ahmed

Rizwan is the uncle of Noman.

=== Ahmed/Kardar ===
- Abdul Hafeez Kardar
- Zulfiqar Ahmed

Abdul and Zulfiqar are brothers in law.

=== Ahmed/Malik ===
- Ijaz Ahmed (cricketer, born 1968)
- Saleem Malik

Ijaz and Salim are brothers-in-law.

=== Akmal/Azam/Qadir ===
- Kamran Akmal
- Umar Akmal
- Adnan Akmal
- Babar Azam
- Abdul Qadir (cricketer)
- Usman Qadir

Kamran, Umar and Adnan are brothers. Kamran is the eldest and Umar the youngest. Babar Azam is their cousin. Usman is Abdul's son. Umar is Qadir's son-in-law and Usman's brother-in-law.

=== Ali/Shafique ===
- Arshad Ali
- Abdullah Shafique

Abdullah is the nephew of Arshad, who played for UAE.

=== Azharuddin/Malik ===
- Mohammad Azharuddin
- Shoaib Malik
- Ghulam Ahmed
- Asif Iqbal

Ghulam Ahmed is the uncle of Asif Iqbal. Both are distantly related to Indian tennis player Sania Mirza who is the wife of Shoaib Malik. Sania Mirza's sister Anam married to the son of Indian cricketer Mohammad Azharuddin.

=== Burki/Khan/Niazi ===
- Imran Khan
- Javed Burki
- Majid Khan
- Bazid Khan
- Misbah ul Haq
- Baqa Jilani
- Jahangir Khan

The first three are cousins. Baqa Jilani who was the uncle of the three, and Jahangir Khan who was the father of Majid played Test cricket for India. Bazid Khan is the son of Majid. Misbah-ul-Haq is the distant cousin of Imran Khan from the Niazi Clan

=== Dalpat/Kaneria ===
- Anil Dalpat
- Danish Kaneria

Anil and Danish are cousins

=== Elahi ===
- Manzoor Elahi
- Zahoor Elahi
- Saleem Elahi

Manzoor, Zahoor and Saleem are brothers.

=== Farhat ===
- Imran Farhat
- Humayun Farhat
- Mohammad Ilyas

Imran and Humayun are brothers, with both playing test and one day cricket. Mohammad Ilyas is father in law of Imran Farhat.

=== Hassan/Sajjad ===
- Pervez Sajjad
- Waqar Hassan

Pervez and Waqar are brothers.

=== Haq ===
- Inzamam Ul Haq
- Imam Ul Haq

Imam is the nephew of Inzamam.

=== Imtiaz ===
- Kainat Imtiaz
- Saleema Imtiaz

Saleema who is an umpire, is the mother of Kainat.

=== Iqbal/Miandad ===
- Javed Miandad
- Faisal Iqbal

Javed is the uncle of Faisal.

=== Khan ===
- Moin Khan
- Nadeem Khan
- Azam Khan

Moin and Nadeem are brothers with both having represented the country in Tests and one-dayers. Azam is the son of Moin.

=== Khan ===
- Shaiza Khan
- Sharmeen Khan

Shaiza and Sharmeen are sisters.

=== Mohammad ===
- Hanif Mohammad
- Mushtaq Mohammad
- Sadiq Mohammad
- Wazir Mohammad
- Shoaib Mohammad

Hanif, Mushtaq, Sadiq and Wazir are brothers. A fifth brother Raees was once twelfth man for Pakistan. Hanif, Mushtaq and Sadiq all played against New Zealand at Karachi in 1969–70. Hanif is the father of Shoaib.

=== Naeem ===
- Naeem Ashraf
- Jasmine Naeem

Jasmine is married to Naeem. Naeem played international cricket for Pakistan, while Naeem is an international umpire.

=== Nazar ===
- Nazar Mohammad
- Mudassar Nazar

Nazar Mohammad is the father of Mudassar Nazar, and also of Mubashir Nazar, who played first-class cricket in Pakistan.

=== Raja ===
- Wasim Raja
- Rameez Raja

Wasim and Rameez are brothers.

=== Rana ===
- Azmat Rana
- Mansoor Rana
- Maqsood Rana
- Shafaqat Rana
- Shakoor Rana
- Rana Naveed ul Hassan

Azmat and Shafaqat are brothers who played international cricket. Their brother Shakoor was an umpire. Shakoor's sons Mansoor and Maqsood played ODIs for Pakistan. Sultan Rana, who was Azmat's twin brother played first-class cricket.

== Papua New Guinea ==
=== Amini ===
- Charles Amini
- Chris Amini

Charles and Chris are brothers.

=== Vala/Siaka ===
- Assad Vala
- Pauke Siaka

Pauke is married to Assad.

== Romania ==
- Marian Gherasim
- Laurentiu Gherasim

Marian and Laurentiu are brothers.

== Rwanda ==
=== Ishimwe ===
- Henriette Ishimwe
- Gisele Ishimwe

Henriette and Gisele are sisters.

== Saint Helena ==
=== Stroud ===
- Barry Stroud
- Phillip Stroud

Barry and Phillip are brothers. Barry played official T20Is for Saint Helena, while Phillip played official T20Is for Falkland Islands. Phillips also represented Saint Helena earlier in career.

== Scotland ==
=== Bryce ===
- Kathryn Bryce
- Sarah Bryce

Kathryn and Sarah are sisters.

=== Currie ===
- Brad Currie
- Scott Currie

Brad and Scott are brothers.

=== Davidson ===
- Jasper Davidson
- Oliver Davidson

Jasper and Oliver are brothers.

=== Drummond ===
- Annette Drummond
- Gordon Drummond
- Abbi Aitken-Drummond

Gordon and Annette are brother and sister. Annette played in 2003 and 2013 for Scotland's Wildcats, Gordon retired as Scotland captain in 2013. Annette and Abbi married each other.

=== Haq/Hussain/Tahir ===
- Omer Hussain
- Majid Haq
- Hamza Tahir

All three men are cousins.

=== Sole ===
- Chris Sole
- Tom Sole

Chris and Tom are brothers.

== Serbia ==
=== Zimonjic ===
- Nemanja Zimonjic
- Vukasin Zimonjic

Nemanja and Vukasin are brothers.

== Singapore ==
=== Bhasin ===
- Ada Bhasin
- Riyaa Bhasin

Ada and Riyaa are twin sisters.

=== Param/Diviya ===
- Anish Paraam
- Navin Param
- Diviya GK

Anish and Navin are brothers. Diviya is a cousin of Navin.

== Sri Lanka ==
=== de Silva ===
- Chaturanga de Silva
- Wanindu Hasaranga

Chaturanga and Hasaranga are brothers

=== de Alwis/Silva ===
- Guy de Alwis
- Rasanjali Silva

Rasanjali is married to Guy. Both played test cricket.

=== Fernando ===
- Nuwanidu Fernando
- Vishwa Fernando

Nuwanidu and Vishwa are brothers.

=== Fernando ===
- Hiruka Fernando
- Rose Fernando

Hiruka and Rose are sisters.

=== Kaluperuma ===
- Lalith Kaluperuma
- Sanath Kaluperuma

Both are brothers.

=== Labrooy ===
- Graeme Labrooy
- Wendell Labrooy

Graeme and Wendell are brothers. While Graeme played international cricket, both of them served as match referee in international cricket.

=== Ranatunga ===
- Arjuna Ranatunga
- Dammika Ranatunga
- Sanjeeva Ranatunga
- Nishantha Ranatunga

All four were brothers.

=== Samaraweera ===
- Dulip Samaraweera
- Thilan Samaraweera

Dulip and Thilan are brothers

=== Warnapura ===
- Bandula Warnapura
- Malinda Warnapura
- Upali Warnapura

Bandula is the uncle of Malinda. Malinda's father Upali officiated in Women's ODIs.

=== Wettimuny ===
- Mithra Wettimuny
- Sidath Wettimuny
- Sunil Wettimuny

All three are brothers

== South Africa ==
=== Bacher ===
- Adam Bacher
- Ali Bacher

Adam is the nephew of Ali.

=== Bosch ===
- Tertius Bosch
- Corbin Bosch
- Eathan Bosch

Corbin and Ethan are the sons of Tertius.

=== Blanckenberg/Ryneveld ===
- Jimmy Blanckenberg
- Clive van Ryneveld

Jimmy was the uncle of Clive.

=== Callaghan/Kemp ===
- David Callaghan
- Justin Kemp

David and Justin are cousins.

=== Cook ===
- Jimmy Cook
- Stephen Cook (cricketer)

Jimmy is Stephen's father.

=== Cox/Tuckett ===
- Joe Cox
- Len Tuckett
- Lindsay Tuckett

Lindsay is the son of Len and nephew of Joe.

=== Du Plessis/Viljoen ===
- Faf du Plessis
- Hardus Viljoen

Faf and Hardus are brothers in law. Hardus has married Rhemi who is Faf's sister.

=== Jansen ===
- Duan Jansen
- Marco Jansen

Duan and Marco are twin brothers.

=== Kapp/van Nierkirk ===
- Marizanne Kapp
- Dane van Niekerk

Van Niekerk and Kapp married in July 2018 In the Women's World T20 that year they became the first married couple to bat together in an ICC tournament.

=== Hands ===
- Phillip Hands
- Reginald Hands

Phillip and Reginald are brothers. Another brother Kenneth played first-class cricket.

=== Hermann ===
- Jordan Hermann
- Rubin Hermann

Jordan and Rubin are brothers.

=== Kirsten ===
- Peter Kirsten
- Andy Kirsten
- Gary Kirsten
- Paul Kirsten

Paul and Gary are brothers, Andy and Peter are half-brothers of Gary and Paul. Both Peter and Gary played international cricket, while Andy was the coach of Kenya national cricket team. Gary had also coached India and South Africa.

=== Lindsay ===
- Denis Lindsay
- Johnny Lindsay
- Neville Lindsay

Denis is the son of Johnny, while Neville is the uncle of Johnny.

=== Malan ===
- Janneman Malan
- Pieter Malan

Janneman and Pieter are brothers. Another brother Andre played at the domestic level. Dawid Malan of England is unrelated.

=== Morkel ===
- Albie Morkel
- Morné Morkel

Albie is the elder brother of Morne.

=== Nourse ===
- Dave Nourse
- Dudley Nourse

Dave was Dudley's father

=== Pithey ===
- Tony Pithey
- David Pithey

Tony and David are brothers.

=== Pollock ===
- Peter Pollock
- Graeme Pollock
- Shaun Pollock

Peter and Graeme are brothers; Peter is Shaun's father.

=== Richards ===
- Alfred Richards
- Dicky Richards

Alfred and Dicky are brothers.

=== Richardson ===
- Dave Richardson
- Michael Richardson

Michael who plays for Germany, is the son of Dave.

=== Rowan ===
- Athol Rowan
- Eric Rowan

Athol and Eric are brothers.

=== Snooke ===
- Stanley Snooke
- Tip Snooke

Stanley and Tip are brothers.

=== Tancred ===
- Bernard Tancred
- Louis Tancred
- Vincent Tancred

All three were brothers.

=== Tapscott ===
- George Tapscott
- Lionel Tapscott

George and Lionel were brothers.

=== Taylor ===
- Dan Taylor
- Herbie Taylor

Dan and Herbie are brothers.

=== Wade ===
- Billy Wade
- Herby Wade

Billy and Herby are brothers.

== Switzerland ==
=== Vinod ===
- Arjun Vinod
- Ashwin Vinod

Arjun and Ashwin are brothers.

== Uganda ==
=== Mukasa/Nsubuga ===
- Roger Mukasa
- Frank Nsubuga

Roger and Frank are brothers. Another brother Lawrence Sematimba played first-class, List-A and T20 cricket for Uganda.

=== Ssenyondo/Ssesazi ===
- Henry Ssenyondo
- Simon Ssesazi

Henry and Simon are brothers.

== United Arab Emirates ==
=== Shahzad ===
- Shahzad Altaf
- Rameez Shahzad

Altaf is the father of Rameez.

=== Rajith ===
- Rinitha Rajith
- Rithika Rajith
- Rishitha Rajith

Rinitha, Rithika and Rishitha are sisters.

== United States of America ==
=== Vaghela ===
- Vatsal Vaghela
- Isani Vaghela

Vatsal and Isani are siblings.

== Vanuatu ==
=== Mansale/Matautaava ===
- Andrew Mansale
- Patrick Matautaava

Andrew and Patrick are cousins.

== West Indies ==
=== Atkinson ===
- Denis Atkinson
- Eric Atkinson

Denis and Eric are brothers.

=== Best ===
- Carlisle Best
- Tino Best

Carlisle is the uncle of Tino.

=== Bravo/Lara ===
- Darren Bravo
- Dwayne Bravo
- Brian Lara

Darren and Dwayne are half-brothers. Brian is uncle of Darren.

=== Browne/Browne-John ===
- Beverly Browne
- Louise Browne
- Anne Browne-John

All three are sisters who played for the West Indian women's cricket team.

=== Cameron ===
- John Cameron
- Jimmy Cameron

Jimmy is the younger brother of John

=== Chanderpaul ===
- Shivnarine Chanderpaul
- Tagenarine Chanderpaul

Tagenarine is son of Shivnarine

=== Croft/Hunte ===
- Colin Croft
- Conrad Hunte

Colin Croft's father was a cousin of Conrad Hunte, Colin played for Guyana whilst Conrad played for Barbados, both played for the West Indies.

=== Collins/Edwards ===
- Pedro Collins
- Fidel Edwards

Fidel and Pedro are half-brothers.

=== Dottin/Gibson ===
- Deandra Dottin
- Ottis Gibson

Deandra and Ottis are cousins.

=== Gibbs/Lloyd ===
- Lance Gibbs
- Clive Lloyd

Gibbs and Lloyd are cousins.

=== Grant ===
- Jackie Grant
- Rolph Grant

Both brothers captained the West Indies side.

=== Davis ===
- Bryan Davis
- Charlie Davis

Bryan and Charlie are brothers.

=== Drakes ===
- Dominic Drakes
- Vasbert Drakes

Dominic is the son of Vasbert.

=== Guillen/van Beek ===
- Sammy Guillen
- Logan van Beek

Logan is the grandson of Sammy. Apart from West Indies, Sammy has also represented New Zealand in international cricket. Logan is currently a Netherlands international cricketer.

=== Headley ===
- George Headley
- Ron Headley

George was Ron's father. Ron's son (and George's grandson), Dean Headley, played Test cricket for England.

=== Holford/Sobers ===
- David Holford
- Sir Garfield Sobers

Both are cousins.

=== Hope ===
- Kyle Hope
- Shai Hope

Kyle and Shai are brothers.

=== Kallicharan/Nagamootoo ===
- Alvin Kallicharan
- Mahendra Nagamootoo

Alvin is Mahendra's uncle. Both played for the West Indies and Guyana. Alvin's brother Derek also played for Guyana as did Mahendra's brother Vishal.

=== Kanhai/Nagamootoo ===
- Rohan Kanhai
- Mahendra Nagamootoo

Rohan is Mahendra's uncle. Both played for the West Indies and Guyana.

=== Knight ===
- Kycia Knight
- Kyshona Knight

Kycia and Kyshona are twin sisters.

=== Marshall ===
- Norman Marshall
- Roy Marshall

Norman and Roy are brothers.

=== Murray/Weekes ===
- David Murray
- Sir Everton Weekes

David is Everton's son. Both played for the West Indies and Barbados. David's son Ricky Hoyte also played for Barbados

=== Reifer ===
- Raymon Reifer
- Floyd Reifer
- Leslie Reifer

All of them are cousins. While Raymon and Floyd played international cricket, Leslie was an umpire.

=== Samuels ===
- Marlon Samuels
- Robert Samuels

Robert is the older brother of Marlon

=== Scott ===
- Alfred Scott
- Tommy Scott

Afred is the son of Tommy.

=== Shillingford ===
- Grayson Shillingford
- Irvine Shillingford
- Shane Shillingford

Grayson and Irvine were first cousins while Shane is related to both. All three played tests for West Indies while Irvine also played ODIs. Earlier generations of the family all representing Dominica include; Hughes, Stafford, and Ivan Shillingford.

=== Simmons ===
- Lendl Simmons
- Phil Simmons

Phil is Lendl's uncle.

=== St Hill ===
- Edwin St Hill
- Wilton St Hill

Edwin and Wilton are brothers.

=== Stollmeyer ===
- Jeffrey Stollmeyer
- Victor Stollmeyer

The Stollmeyer brothers played cricket for the West Indies and Trinidad and Tobago.

=== Walcott ===
- Clyde Walcott
- Keith Walcott

While Clyde played for West Indies, Keith was a selector and assistant manager of the West Indies cricket team.

== Zimbabwe ==
=== Campbell ===
- Alistair Campbell
- Johnathan Campbell

Johnathan is the son of Alistair.

=== Chibhabha ===
- Chamu Chibhabha
- Julia Chibhabha

Chamu and Julia are siblings.

=== Curran ===
- Kevin Curran
- Tom Curran
- Ben Curran
- Sam Curran

Tom, Ben, and Sam are the sons of Kevin. While Kevin and Ben represented Zimbabwe, Tom and Sam represent England in international cricket.

=== Ebrahim ===
- Dion Ebrahim
- Kate Ebrahim

Kate is married to Dion, who played for New Zealand in international cricket.

=== Ervine ===
- Sean Ervine
- Craig Ervine

Sean and Craig are brothers.

=== Evans ===
- Brad Evans
- Craig Evans

Craig is the father of Brad.

=== Flower ===
- Grant Flower
- Andy Flower (captain)

Grant and Andy are brothers.

=== Jarvis ===
- Malcolm Jarvis
- Kyle Jarvis

Malcolm is the father of Kyle.

=== Kaia ===
- Innocent Kaia
- Roy Kaia

Innocent and Roy are brothers. Knowledge Kaia, who is eldest of the three, played first class cricket in Zimbabwe.

=== Masakadza ===
- Hamilton Masakadza
- Shingirai Masakadza
- Wellington Masakadza

Hamilton and Shingirai are both older brothers to Wellington

=== Mutasa/Nyumbu ===
- Christina Mutasa
- John Nyumbu

Mutasa is the niece of Nyumbu.

=== Muzarabani ===
- Blessing Muzarabani
- Taurai Muzarabani

Taurai is the uncle of Blessing.

=== Rennie ===
- Gavin Rennie
- John Rennie

Gavin and John are brothers.

=== Strang ===
- Bryan Strang
- Paul Strang

Bryan and Paul are brothers.

Note: All three pairs of Flowers, Rennies and Strangs played in a Test against New Zealand at Harare in September 1997.

=== Streak ===
- Heath Streak
- Denis Streak

Heath is the son of Denis. While Heath played for Zimbabwe, Denis was a national selector. Denis had played for the national team before they were awarded Test status.

=== Tiripano ===
- Donald Tiripano
- Chipo Mugeri-Tiripano

Chipo is married to Donald.

=== Waller ===
- Andy Waller
- Malcolm Waller

Andy is the father of Malcolm.

=== Whittall ===
- Andrew Whittall
- Guy Whittall

Andrew and Guy are cousins.

== See also ==
- List of professional sports families
- List of family relations in American football
  - List of second-generation National Football League players
- List of association football (soccer) families
  - List of African association football families
  - List of European association football families
    - List of English association football families
    - List of former Yugoslavia association football families
    - List of Scottish football families
    - List of Spanish association football families
  - Category:Association football families
- List of Australian rules football families
- List of second-generation Major League Baseball players
- List of second-generation National Basketball Association players
- List of boxing families
- List of chess families
- List of family relations in the National Hockey League
- List of family relations in rugby league
- List of international rugby union families
- List of professional wrestling families
