= Charles Gregory =

Charles Gregory may refer to:

- Charles Hutton Gregory (1817–1898), British civil engineer
- Charles Levinge Gregory (1870–1944), British Army and British Indian Army officer
- Charles Gregory (rugby), rugby league and rugby union player from New Zealand
- Charles Smith Gregory (1847–1935), Australian cricketer
- Charles William Gregory (1878–1910), Australian cricketer, his nephew
