= Nat Thomson =

Australian cricketer

Nathaniel Thomson
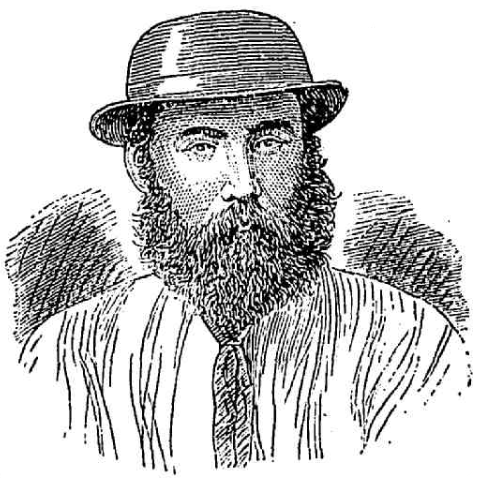

Personal information
- Full name: Nathaniel Frampton Davis Thomson
- Born: 29 May 1839; Surry Hills, New South Wales, Australia
- Died: 2 September 1896 (aged 57); Burwood, New South Wales, Australia
- Batting: Right-handed

International information
- National side: Australia
- Test debut (cap 11): 15 March 1877 v England
- Last Test: 31 March 1877 v England

Career statistics
Competition	Test	First-class
Matches	2	27
Runs scored	67	705
Batting average	16.75	14.09
100s/50s	0/0	0/3
Top score	41	73
Balls bowled	112	1472
Wickets	1	23
Bowling average	31.00	22.26
5 wickets in innings	0	0
10 wickets in match	0	0
Best bowling	1/14	3/13
Catches/stumpings	3/0	23/7
- Source: Cricinfo, 17 November 2022

Nathaniel Frampton Davis Thomson (29 May 1839 – 2 September 1896) was an Australian cricketer who played in the first two Tests ever played, in 1877.

When Australia won the toss on 15 March 1877 and elected to bat, Nat Thomson came out with Australia's No. 1 batsman Charles Bannerman to form the first-ever Test batting partnership. Thomson was 37 years 290 days old, which made him the second-oldest player on the ground behind England's James Southerton, who remains to this day the oldest Test debutant ever. Thomson has the distinction of being the first batsman dismissed in a Test match, when he was clean bowled by England's Allen Hill for 1 when the score was 2. In the Second Test a fortnight later he made 41 in the second innings, adding 88 for the first wicket with Dave Gregory.

Thomson began his career with New South Wales in the 1850s principally as a fieldsman, but his batting improved, and he scored New South Wales' first inter-colonial fifty in 1867–68. He was offered a position on the Australian touring team to England in 1878 but declined due to business reasons and thus finished his brief international career.

Until 1993 Wisden listed him as Nathaniel Thompson (without middle names), born 21 April 1838 in Birmingham, England, and the brief biographical details in Bill Frindall's Wisden Book of Test Cricket 1876-77 to 1977-78 list him as such. This would have made him the earliest-born Australian Test cricketer. However, a note in the Births and Deaths section of the 1993 Wisden announced that research had "led to a change in the details for N.F.D. Thomson (formerly listed as Thompson)", and since that time Thomson's name and birth information have been listed as in this article. Thomson and Ned Gregory are now assumed to have been born on the same day, and jointly hold the distinction of being the earliest-born Australian Test cricketer.

Preceded by James Southerton	Oldest Living Test Cricketer; 16 June 1880 – 2 September 1896	Succeeded by Ned Gregory
Notes and references
1. Jointly with E J Gregory
