= History of Test cricket from 1901 to 1914 =

For more coverage of cricket, go to the.

== England in Australia 1901/2 ==
This was the last privately run England tour of Australia. The Melbourne Cricket Club invited MCC to send a side, but they declined. Archie MacLaren was therefore invited instead, and accepted. George Hirst, Wilfred Rhodes, KS Ranjitsinjhi, Stanley Jackson and CB Fry were not available. Maclaren's great coup was to select Sydney Barnes, who had been playing in the Lancashire League and had played only a handful of games for Lancashire.

Match length: Timeless. Balls per over: 6. Series result: Australia won 4–1.

No.	Date	Home captain	Away captain	Venue	Result
65	13,14,16 Dec 1901	Joe Darling	Archie MacLaren	Sydney Cricket Ground	ENG by Inns&124 runs
66	1,2,3,4 Jan 1902	Joe Darling	Archie MacLaren	Melbourne Cricket Ground	AUS by 229 runs
67	17,18,20,21,22,23 Jan 1902	Joe Darling	Archie MacLaren	Adelaide Oval	AUS by 4 wkts
68	14,15,17,18 Feb 1902	Hugh Trumble	Archie MacLaren	Sydney Cricket Ground	AUS by 7 wkts
69	28 Feb, 1,3,4 Mar 1902	Hugh Trumble	Archie MacLaren	Melbourne Cricket Ground	AUS by 32 runs

== Australia in England 1902 ==
Match length: 3 days. Balls per over: 6. Series result: Australia won 2–1.

No.	Date	Home captain	Away captain	Venue	Result
70	29,30–31 May 1902	Archie MacLaren	Joe Darling	Edgbaston	DRAW
71	12,13,14 Jun 1902	Archie MacLaren	Joe Darling	Lord's	DRAW
72	3,4,5 Jul 1902	Archie MacLaren	Joe Darling	Bramall Lane	AUS by 143 runs
73	24,25,26 Jul 1902	Archie MacLaren	Joe Darling	Old Trafford	AUS by 3 runs
74	11,12,13 Aug 1902	Archie MacLaren	Joe Darling	Oval	ENG by 1 wkt

== Australia in South Africa 1902/3 ==
Match length: 3 days. Balls per over: 6. Series result: Australia won 2–0.

No.	Date	Home captain	Away captain	Venue	Result
75	11,13,14 Oct 1902	Henry Taberer	Joe Darling	Old Wanderers	DRAW
76	18,20,21 Oct 1902	Biddy Anderson	Joe Darling	Old Wanderers	AUS by 159 runs
77	8,10,11 Nov 1902	Ernest Halliwell	Joe Darling	Newlands	AUS by 10 wkts

== England in Australia 1903/4 ==
This was the first touring party to be selected and managed by MCC.

Match length: Timeless. Balls per over: 6. Series result: England won 3–2.

No.	Date	Home captain	Away captain	Venue	Result
78	11,12,14,15,16,17 Dec 1903	Monty Noble	Plum Warner	Sydney Cricket Ground	ENG by 5 wkts
79	1,2,4,5 Jan 1904	Monty Noble	Plum Warner	Melbourne Cricket Ground	ENG by 185 runs
80	15,16,18,19,20 Jan 1904	Monty Noble	Plum Warner	Adelaide Oval	AUS by 216 runs
81	26,27,29 Feb, 1,2,3 Mar 1904	Monty Noble	Plum Warner	Sydney Cricket Ground	ENG by 157 runs
82	5,7,8 Mar 1904	Monty Noble	Plum Warner	Melbourne Cricket Ground	AUS by 218 runs

== Australia in England 1905 ==
Match length: 3 days. Balls per over: 6. Series result: England won 2–0.

No.	Date	Home captain	Away captain	Venue	Result
83	29,30–31 May 1905	Honourable Stanley Jackson	Joe Darling	Trent Bridge	ENG by 213 runs
84	15,16,17 Jun 1905	Honourable Stanley Jackson	Joe Darling	Lord's	DRAW
85	3,4,5 Jul 1905	Honourable Stanley Jackson	Joe Darling	Headingley	DRAW
86	24,25,26 Jul 1905	Honourable Stanley Jackson	Joe Darling	Old Trafford	ENG by Inns&80 runs
87	14,15,16 Aug 1905	Honourable Stanley Jackson	Joe Darling	Oval	DRAW

== England in South Africa 1905/6 ==
Match length: 4 days. Balls per over: 6. Series result: South Africa won 4–1.

No.	Date	Home captain	Away captain	Venue	Result
88	2,3,4 Jan 1906	Percy Sherwell	Plum Warner	Old Wanderers	SA by 1 wkt
89	6,7,8 Mar 1906	Percy Sherwell	Plum Warner	Old Wanderers	SA by 9 wkts
90	10,12,13,14 Mar 1906	Percy Sherwell	Plum Warner	Old Wanderers	SA by 243 runs
91	24,26,27 Mar 1906	Percy Sherwell	Plum Warner	Newlands	ENG by 4 wkts
92	30,31 Mar, 2 Apr 1906	Percy Sherwell	Plum Warner	Newlands	SA by Inns&16 runs

== South Africa in England 1907 ==
Match length: 3 days. Balls per over: 6. Series result: England won 1–0.

No.	Date	Home captain	Away captain	Venue	Result
93	1,2,3 Jul 1907	Tip Foster	Percy Sherwell	Lord's	DRAW
94	29,30,31 Jul 1907	Tip Foster	Percy Sherwell	Headingley	ENG by 53 runs
95	19,20,21 Aug 1907	Tip Foster	Percy Sherwell	Oval	DRAW

== England in Australia 1907/8 ==
Match length: Timeless. Balls per over: 6. Series result: Australia won 4–1.

No.	Date	Home captain	Away captain	Venue	Result
96	13,14,16,17,18,19 Dec 1907	Monty Noble	Frederick Fane	Sydney Cricket Ground	AUS by 2 wkts
97	1,2,3,4,6,7 Jan 1908	Monty Noble	Frederick Fane	Melbourne Cricket Ground	ENG by 1 wkt
98	10,11,13,14,15,16 Jan 1908	Monty Noble	Frederick Fane	Adelaide Oval	AUS by 245 runs
99	7,8,10,11 Feb 1908	Monty Noble	Arthur Jones	Melbourne Cricket Ground	AUS by 308 runs
100	21,22,24,25,26,27 Feb 1908	Monty Noble	Arthur Jones	Sydney Cricket Ground	AUS by 49 runs

== Australia in England 1909 ==
Match length: 3 days. Balls per over: 6. Series result: Australia won 2–1.

No.	Date	Home captain	Away captain	Venue	Result
101	27,28–29 May 1909	Archie MacLaren	Monty Noble	Edgbaston	ENG by 10 wkts
102	14,15,16 Jun 1909	Archie MacLaren	Monty Noble	Lord's	AUS by 9 wkts
103	1,2,3 Jul 1909	Archie MacLaren	Monty Noble	Headingley	AUS by 126 runs
104	26,27,28 Jul 1909	Archie MacLaren	Monty Noble	Old Trafford	DRAW
105	9,10,11 Aug 1909	Archie MacLaren	Monty Noble	Oval	DRAW

== England in South Africa 1909/10 ==
Match length: 5 days. Balls per over: 6. Series result: South Africa won 3–2.

No.	Date	Home captain	Away captain	Venue	Result
106	1,3,4,5 Jan 1910	Tip Snooke	Shrimp Leveson Gower	Old Wanderers	SA by 19 runs
107	21,22,24,25,26 Jan 1910	Tip Snooke	Shrimp Leveson Gower	Lord's, Durban	SA by 95 runs
108	26,28 Feb, 1,2,3 Mar 1910	Tip Snooke	Shrimp Leveson Gower	Old Wanderers	ENG by 3 wkts
109	7,8,9 Mar 1910	Tip Snooke	Frederick Fane	Newlands	SA by 4 wkts
110	11,12,14 Mar 1910	Tip Snooke	Frederick Fane	Newlands	ENG by 9 wkts

== South Africa in Australia 1910/11 ==
Match length: Timeless. Balls per over: 6. Series result: Australia won 4–1.

No.	Date	Home captain	Away captain	Venue	Result
111	9,10,12,13,14 Dec 1910	Clem Hill	Percy Sherwell	Sydney Cricket Ground	AUS by Inns&114 runs
112	31 Dec, 2,3,4 Jan 1910/1	Clem Hill	Percy Sherwell	Melbourne Cricket Ground	AUS by 89 runs
113	7,9,10,11,12,13 Jan 1911	Clem Hill	Percy Sherwell	Adelaide Oval	SA by 38 runs
114	17,18,20,21 Feb 1911	Clem Hill	Percy Sherwell	Melbourne Cricket Ground	AUS by 530 runs
115	3,4,6,7 Mar 1911	Clem Hill	Percy Sherwell	Sydney Cricket Ground	AUS by 7 wkts

== England in Australia 1911/12 ==
Match length: Timeless. Balls per over: 6. Series result: England won 4–1.

No.	Date	Home captain	Away captain	Venue	Result
116	15,16,18,19,20,21 Dec 1911	Clem Hill	Johnny Douglas	Sydney Cricket Ground	AUS by 146 runs
117	30 Dec, 1,2,3 Jan 1911/2	Clem Hill	Johnny Douglas	Melbourne Cricket Ground	ENG by 8 wkts
118	12,13,15,16,17 Jan 1912	Clem Hill	Johnny Douglas	Adelaide Oval	ENG by 7 wkts
119	9,10,12,13 Feb 1912	Clem Hill	Johnny Douglas	Melbourne Cricket Ground	ENG by Inns&225 runs
120	23,24,26,27,28,29 Feb, 1 Mar 1912	Clem Hill	Johnny Douglas	Sydney Cricket Ground	ENG by 70 runs

== Triangular tournament: Australia and South Africa in 1912 ==
Match length: 3 days (except last game: Timeless). Balls per over: 6. Series result: England won the triangular tournament.

No.	Date	Team	Captain	Team	Captain	Venue	Result
121	27–28 May 1912	Australia	Syd Gregory	South Africa	Frank Mitchell	Old Trafford	AUS by Inns&88 runs
122	10,11,12 Jun 1912	England	CB Fry	South Africa	Frank Mitchell	Lord's	ENG by Inns&62 runs
123	24,25,26 Jun 1912	England	CB Fry	Australia	Syd Gregory	Lord's	DRAW
124	8,9,10 Jul 1912	England	CB Fry	South Africa	Louis Tancred	Headingley	ENG by 174 runs
125	15,16,17 Jul 1912	Australia	Syd Gregory	South Africa	Frank Mitchell	Lord's	AUS by 10 wkts
126	29,30,21 Jul 1912	England	CB Fry	Australia	Syd Gregory	Old Trafford	DRAW
127	5,6,7 Aug	Australia	Syd Gregory	South Africa	Louis Tancred	Trent Bridge	DRAW
128	12,13 Aug	England	CB Fry	South Africa	Louis Tancred	Oval	ENG by 10 wkts
129	19,20,21,22 Aug	England	CB Fry	Australia	Syd Gregory	Oval	ENG by 244 runs

== England in South Africa 1913/4 ==
Match length: 4 days. Balls per over: 6. Series result: England won 4–0.

No.	Date	Home captain	Away captain	Venue	Result
130	13,15,16,17 Dec 1913	Herbie Taylor	Johnny Douglas	Lord's, Durban	ENG by Inns&157 runs
131	26,27,29,30 Dec 1913	Herbie Taylor	Johnny Douglas	Old Wanderers	ENG by Inns&12 runs
132	1,2,3,5 Jan 1914	Herbie Taylor	Johnny Douglas	Old Wanderers	ENG by 91 runs
133	14,16,17,17 Feb 1914	Herbie Taylor	Johnny Douglas	Lord's, Durban	DRAW
134	27,28 Feb, 2,3 Mar 1914	Herbie Taylor	Johnny Douglas	St George's Park	ENG by 10 wkts
