= International cricket in 1876–77 =

International cricket season

The 1876–77 international cricket season was from September 1876 to March 1877. This is the first international cricket season witnessed the first Test match between the hosts Australia and England. The series consisted with two timeless Test matches tied 1–1.

Englishman Alfred Shaw bowled the first Test delivery to Australian Charles Bannerman. Bannerman later became the first Test centurion in Test cricket history. Englishman Allen Hill had both the first Test wicket and the first catch. Billy Midwinter of Australia picked up the first 5 wicket haul in Test history whereas Australian Jack Blackham had the first stumping. James Southerton still holds the record for the oldest Test debutant at 49 years 119 days. Bannerman's score of 165 made 69.6% of his side's runs from the bat, still a record in Test matches.

== Season overview ==
International tours
Start date	Home team	Away team	Results [Matches]	
Start date	Home team	Away team	Test	FC
15 March 1877	Australia	England	1–1 [2]	—

== January ==
=== England in Australia ===
One-off Test match
No.	Date	Home captain	Away captain	Venue	Result
Test 1	15–19 March	Dave Gregory	James Lillywhite	Melbourne Cricket Ground, Melbourne	Australia by 45 runs
Test 2	31 March–4 April	Dave Gregory	James Lillywhite	Melbourne Cricket Ground, Melbourne	England by 4 wickets
