= International cricket in 1909–10 =

International cricket season

The 1909–10 international cricket season was from September 1909 to April 1910. The season consists with a single international tour.

== Season overview ==
International tours
Start date	Home team	Away team	Results [Matches]			
Start date	Home team	Away team	Test	ODI	FC	LA
1 January 1910	South Africa	England	3–2 [5]	—	—	—

== January ==
=== England in South Africa ===
Test series
No.	Date	Home captain	Away captain	Venue	Result
Test 106	1–5 January	Tip Snooke	Leveson Gower	Old Wanderers, Johannesburg	South Africa by 19 runs
Test 107	21–26 January	Tip Snooke	Leveson Gower	Lord's No. 1 Ground, Cape Town	South Africa by 95 runs
Test 108	26 Feb–3 March	Tip Snooke	Frederick Fane	Old Wanderers, Johannesburg	England by 3 wickets
Test 109	7–9 March	Tip Snooke	Frederick Fane	Newlands Cricket Ground, Cape Town	South Africa by 4 wickets
Test 110	11–14 March	Tip Snooke	Frederick Fane	Newlands Cricket Ground, Cape Town	England by 9 wickets
