= John Watkins (South African cricketer) =

South African cricketer (1923–2021)

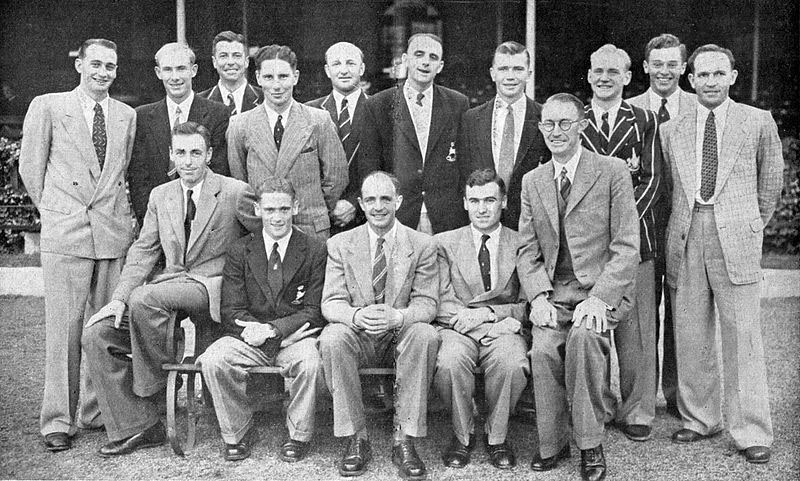
- The South African touring team in 1952–53. Watkins is standing in the centre of the back row.

Personal information
- Full name: John Cecil Watkins
- Born: 10 April 1923; Durban, South Africa
- Died: 3 September 2021 (aged 98); Durban, South Africa
- Batting: Right-handed
- Bowling: Right-arm medium

International information
- National side: South Africa (1949–1957)
- Test debut (cap 174): 24 December 1949 v Australia
- Last Test: 1 January 1957 v England

Career statistics
Competition	Tests	First-class
Matches	15	60
Runs scored	612	2158
Batting average	23.53	24.80
100s/50s	0/3	2/8
Top score	92	169
Balls bowled	2805	9073
Wickets	29	96
Bowling average	28.13	28.52
5 wickets in innings	0	1
10 wickets in match	0	0
Best bowling	4/22	5/37
Catches/stumpings	12/–	54/–
- Source: Cricinfo

John Cecil Watkins (10 April 1923 – 3 September 2021) was a South African cricketer who played in 15 Test matches for South Africa between 1949 and 1957. At the time of his death aged 98, Watkins was the oldest living Test cricketer and the last surviving member of the side that toured Australasia in 1952–53.

== Cricket career ==
Watkins was a hard-hitting middle-order batsman, medium-pace bowler, and expert slips fieldsman. He played two Tests against Australia in South Africa in 1949–50, but was unable to get leave to go on the tour of England in 1951. His best series with the bat was in Australia in 1952–53, when he made 352 runs at 35.20. In the Fifth Test at Melbourne, after Australia batted first and made 520, Watkins, batting at number three, hit 92 (his highest Test score) and 50 to help South Africa to victory by six wickets, to square the series two-all. His best bowling figures came in the next Test, against New Zealand at Wellington, where he opened the bowling, taking 4 for 22 in the second innings and figures of 50.5–31–51–5 for the match; again South Africa won. In his five Tests against New Zealand (in 1952–53 in New Zealand and in 1953–54 in South Africa) he took 18 wickets at 13.50.

Watkins played for Natal from 1946–47 to 1957–58, with a highest score of 169 against Orange Free State at Durban in 1950–51, and one other century, 144 against Transvaal, also at Durban, in 1955–56. His best bowling figures were 5 for 37 against Rhodesia at Salisbury in 1957–58, in his second-last match.

Christopher Martin-Jenkins described Watkins as "a right-handed batsman with a fine range of scoring strokes – his batting, like the man himself, was cavalier and joyous".

== Personal life ==
Watkins was born in Durban, Natal, and grew up there. He suffered from mild deformities of the hips and lower back from birth, which eventually required five operations after he retired from playing cricket. After his schooling at Glenwood High School, he served in the Second World War in Italy, at first as a trainee Spitfire pilot until it was discovered that he was colour-blind, after which he was transferred to air traffic control.

Watkins worked as a secretary-accountant. He was the last surviving member of the side that toured Australasia in 1952–53. Following the death of Lindsay Tuckett on 5 September 2016, Watkins became the oldest living Test cricketer. He died on 3 September 2021, in Durban from COVID-19 at the age of 98.

Records
Preceded by Lindsay Tuckett	Oldest living Test cricketer 5 September 2016 – 3 September 2021	Succeeded by Ronald Draper
