= Carlisle Best =

Barbadian cricketer

Personal information
- Full name: Carlisle Alonza Best
- Born: 14 May 1959 (age 67); Richmond Gap, Saint Michael, Barbados
- Batting: Right-handed
- Bowling: Right-arm off break Right-arm medium pace
- Role: Batsman
- Relatives: Tino Best (great-nephew)

International information
- National side: West Indies
- Test debut (cap 185): 21 February 1986 v England
- Last Test: 23 November 1990 v Pakistan
- ODI debut (cap 48): 4 March 1986 v England
- Last ODI: 16 January 1992 v India

Domestic team information
- Years: Team
- 1979–1994: Barbados
- 1993–1994: Western Province

Career statistics
Competition	Tests	ODIs	FC	LA
Matches	8	24	90	79
Runs scored	342	473	5,439	1,942
Batting average	28.50	24.89	38.85	29.87
100s/50s	1/1	1/2	13/24	2/12
Top score	164	100	179	137*
Balls bowled	30	19	1,642	682
Wickets	0	0	24	14
Bowling average	–	–	32.16	40.78
5 wickets in innings	0	0	0	0
10 wickets in match	0	0	0	0
Best bowling	0/2	0/4	3/29	2/22
Catches/stumpings	8/–	5/–	107/–	21/–
- Source: Cricket Archive, 19 October 2010

Carlisle Alonza Best (born 14 May 1959) is a Barbadian former cricketer who played eight Tests and 24 One Day Internationals for the West Indies. He represented the West Indies at the 1987 World Cup.

A right-handed batsman, Best hit his first scoring shot on his Test debut for six runs. This was only the second time in the history of Test cricket that this feat had been achieved. Over his career, Best made one century in each international format (both coming against England), and also captained West Indies B on a tour of Zimbabwe.

Best was known for his unusual habit of commentating on himself while batting. Following his replacement in the West Indies side by Brian Lara, and other perceived slights to Barbados, local fans boycotted a Test match, costing their cricket board an estimated £100,000. Best now works for a bank and in the media.

== Playing career ==
=== Early years ===
Best first came to attention when he scored more than 800 runs in the Barbados leagues in 1976, while still a schoolboy. This secured his selection for the West Indies youth championship, in which he scored a century for Barbados against Guyana. In turn, he was then picked for a West Indies youth team tour of England in 1978.

=== Test debut ===
Following strong performances for the full Barbados team, Best was called into the West Indies team and made his Test cricket debut at Kingston, Jamaica, in 1986 against England. After ducking and being hit by the first two balls he received, both bouncers from Ian Botham, Best hooked his third ball for six runs; it was his first scoring shot. It was only the second time in the history of Test cricket that a batsman's first scoring shot in Test cricket was a six. Best is still the only West Indian to achieve this feat. He went on to score 35 in his first Test innings.

Following a series of low scores, Best was dropped after just three Tests. He felt aggrieved: "I was the most disappointed and hurt man in the world," he said. "We were 3–0 up, no pressure was on us and I was unceremoniously discarded. I never had a chance to develop."

=== Introduction to ODIs ===
Best made his One Day International debut, also against England, in the series that followed the Test cricket: he made 10. An opportunity to captain was granted in late 1986, when Best was appointed to lead a West Indies B team tour of Zimbabwe. He was selected for the West Indies squad for the [one-day] 1987 Cricket World Cup and made the team for two of West Indies' six matches, scoring 23 runs at an average of 11.5, with a high score of 18. He cemented his place in the one-day side in late 1989, playing 15 matches in just over a year, the highlight of which statistically was an innings of exactly 100, made off 119 balls against England.

=== Recall to the Test team ===
A recall to the full Test side was not to come until the 1990 home series, which, once again was against England. Best, now aged 30, made a century on his home ground in Barbados. Wisden's match report said that the first day of the Test "was a day belonging to Best, a local hero, delighting in the first century of a hitherto frustrating Test career." However, that score of 164, was, according to Cricinfo, "his zenith". He also made a century in Guyana in the corresponding one-day international series. The century guaranteed his selection for the winter tour of Pakistan, but successive scores of 1, 8, 6 and 7, combined with splitting the webbing of his right hand, ended his Test career, this time for good. His replacement in the side was Brian Lara, who proved an immediate success.

=== Decline ===
Best did go on to represent West Indies in a few more one-day matches, with four innings played in a 'World Series' triangular tournament in Australia in 1991–92; he failed to exceed 30 in any of the innings, played against the hosts and India. He remained popular in Barbados: grievances leading to a boycott of the Barbados Test in a series in 1991–92 included Best's non-selection, as well as perceived slights to other locals Anderson Cummins, Malcolm Marshall and Desmond Haynes. Only a few hundred spectators attended each of the five days of the match, which cost the host cricket board an estimated £100,000.

== Personality, family and post-cricket career ==
While batting, Best was known for an unusual habit: commentating audibly on his own performance, referring to himself in the third person. David Boon recalled:

It was as if someone had brought a radio to the middle. He'd be facing up ... and he'd be chattering away like: "And Best faces up to Alderman, who's at the top of his mark. He's one of the world's best swing bowlers ... he comes in with his fluent and powerful run-up, he lets it go ... and Best lets it go outside off stump. You should have hit that for four, Carlisle Best". ... Best would aggravate bowlers with commentary such as: "And Best rocks back and pulls it for four. Craig McDermott must surely know by now, you can't be bowling there to Carlisle Best" ... it was just comical.

Best's great-nephew is fellow West Indian cricketer Tino Best. The relationship is often reported on as uncle/nephew, due to the proximity of their ages. Tino Best describes him in glowing terms: "The most important person of all ... My first hero, my rock, my demi-god ... and my father. For me he is the greatest cricketer who ever lived ... and the best talker."

Since retiring from cricket, Carlisle Best has worked in public relations for the Central Bank of Barbados. He also writes about cricket occasionally for Nationnews, and also has been a radio presenter, co-presenting the Best and Mason radio show for the Caribbean Broadcasting Corporation from 1995 to 2010.
