= Murray Webb =

New Zealand cricketer and caricaturist

Personal information
- Full name: Murray George Webb
- Born: 22 June 1947 (age 79); Invercargill, New Zealand
- Height: 6 ft 4 in (1.93 m)
- Batting: Right-handed
- Bowling: Right-arm fast
- Relatives: Richard Webb (brother)

International information
- National side: New Zealand (1971–1974)
- Test debut (cap 122): 5 March 1971 v England
- Last Test: 1 March 1974 v Australia

Domestic team information
- Years: Team
- 1969/70–1973/74: Otago
- 1972/73: Canterbury

Career statistics
| Competition | Test | FC | LA |
|---|---|---|---|
| Matches | 3 | 32 | 6 |
| Runs scored | 12 | 202 | 12 |
| Batting average | 6.00 | 10.09 | – |
| 100s/50s | 0/0 | 0/0 | 0/0 |
| Top score | 12 | 21 | 8* |
| Balls bowled | 732 | 6,685 | 322 |
| Wickets | 4 | 133 | 8 |
| Bowling average | 117.75 | 23.39 | 19.87 |
| 5 wickets in innings | 0 | 10 | 0 |
| 10 wickets in match | 0 | 0 | – |
| Best bowling | 2/114 | 7/49 | 3/18 |
| Catches/stumpings | 0/– | 11/– | 1/– |
- Source: Cricinfo, 1 April 2017

Murray George Webb (born 22 June 1947) is a prominent New Zealand caricature artist and a former New Zealand Test cricketer. He was born at Invercargill in 1947 and educated at Timaru Boys' High School.

== Cricket career ==
Six feet four inches tall, Murray Webb was a fast bowler who played first-class cricket for Otago between 1969–70 and 1973–74 and represented New Zealand in three Test matches. He was one of the fastest bowlers ever to play in New Zealand domestic cricket.

On his first-class debut, against Wellington, he took 5 for 34 and 3 for 43, and he finished his first season with 31 wickets at a bowling average of 17.25 runs per wicket, helping Otago to win the Plunket Shield. He played one match for New Zealand against the visiting Australian team, and Wisden noted the emergence of "a most promising fast bowler". In 1970–71, he took 6 for 56 for South Island against North Island in a trial match before the two-match series against England, and made his Test debut in the Second Test, taking two wickets.

His bowling helped Otago to another Plunket Shield in 1971–72, when he took his best first-class figures of 7 for 49 against Wellington. He toured the West Indies with New Zealand at the end of the season, but took only eight wickets in six matches, and none in the one Test he played.

After playing only once during the 1972–73 season, he returned to Otago in 1973–74 and took 40 wickets in five matches in the Plunket Shield at 14.65. He took five or more wickets in an innings five times, with best figures of 6 for 49 against Auckland. He was selected for the first Test against Australia, but took only two wickets in a drawn match on a batsmen's pitch. Despite being selected as the New Zealand Cricket Almanack's Player of the Year, it was his last first-class match, at the age of 26.

His younger brother Richard also played a pace bowler for Otago. He also represented New Zealand, playing in three One Day Internationals in 1982–83.

== Artistic career ==
After a brief stint as a teacher in Dunedin, Webb has been a prolific caricaturist since the 1970s. His subjects include politicians, sports people, and other people in the public eye, both in New Zealand and abroad. As well as contemporary figures he also draws people from the past, including six portraits of Katherine Mansfield.

The Auckland psychology academic Barry Hughes has written: "Why do Murray Webb's caricatures of public figures look, paradoxically, more truthful than their photographs?" The Alexander Turnbull Library, National Library of New Zealand, holds more than 800 items by Webb in its collection, most of them single digital portraits.

Webb provided the illustrations to the book 100 Great Rugby Characters by Joseph Romanos and Grant Harding (Rugby Press, Auckland, 1991). His regular spot in the editorial pages of the Otago Daily Times was called "Webbsight". He now concentrates on private commissions.

== Personal life ==
Webb has two sisters and a brother, Richard. He was a passenger on the Wahine when it sank in Wellington Harbour in 1968. He helped save a toddler by gently tossing the child from the sinking ship to its mother in a lifeboat.

A graduate of the University of Otago where he studied geography, Webb lives in Dunedin. He has been married twice and has three sons and a daughter.
