= Joe Cox (cricketer) =

South African cricketer

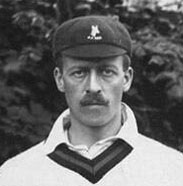
- Joe Cox in 1912

Personal information
- Full name: Joseph Lovell Cox
- Born: 8 June 1886; Pietermaritzburg, Natal
- Died: 4 July 1971 (aged 85); Bulawayo, Rhodesia
- Height: 6 ft 1 in (1.85 m)
- Batting: Right-handed
- Bowling: Right-arm medium

International information
- National side: South Africa

Domestic team information
- Years: Team
- 1910–11 to 1921–22: Natal

Career statistics
Competition	Tests	First-class
Matches	3	42
Runs scored	17	357
Batting average	3.39	8.30
100s/50s	0/0	0/1
Top score	12*	51
Balls bowled	576	6,232
Wickets	4	120
Bowling average	61.25	22.53
5 wickets in innings	0	4
10 wickets in match	0	1
Best bowling	2/74	8/20
Catches/stumpings	1/0	14/0
- Source: CricketArchive

Joseph Lovell Cox (28 June 1886 – 4 July 1971) was a South African Test cricket player.

Joe Cox was educated at St. Charles College, Pietermaritzburg, and moved to Durban after completing his schooling. He was a fast-medium bowler and a tail-end batsman. Playing for Natal throughout, his first-class career spanned the years either side of World War I, 1911 to 1922, but it was his first season in 1910–11 that was his most successful. In his very first match, played at Durban against Orange Free State, he scored 51 batting at number 10, Natal's second highest score of the innings and a total that Cox was never subsequently to surpass. In his second match, against Western Province, he took seven wickets in the second innings for 42 runs, and a few days later he took eight for 20 against Transvaal, seven of the opposition being bowled. In all six matches that season, he took 36 wickets for 402 runs (average 11.16) and helped Natal to their first domestic championship title.

He was selected for the tour of England in 1912 but from 37 matches, he only played in 14 (none of them Test matches) and when he did play he was under-used as a bowler and took only 14 wickets. When England came to South Africa in 1913–14 under the captaincy of J.W.H.T. Douglas, Cox played in three of the five Tests without distinction.

His death in 1971 went unrecorded in Wisden. He was the brother-in-law of Len Tuckett and the uncle of Lindsay Tuckett, both of whom played Test cricket for South Africa.
