= History of Test cricket =

Test match cricket has a history from the first Test match played in 1877, to date.

- History of Test cricket from 1877 to 1883
- History of Test cricket from 1884 to 1889
- History of Test cricket from 1890 to 1900
- History of Test cricket from 1901 to 1914
