= Inger Nielsen =

Danish cricketer

Personal information
- Full name: Inger Nielsen
- Relatives: Susanne Nielsen (sister)

International information
- National side: Denmark
- ODI debut (cap 29): 6 July 1997 v Netherlands
- Last ODI: 21 July 1999 v Netherlands

Career statistics
Competition	WODI
Matches	9
Runs scored	21
Batting average	21.00
100s/50s	0/0
Top score	7*
Balls bowled	276
Wickets	4
Bowling average	42.50
5 wickets in innings	0
10 wickets in match	0
Best bowling	2/16
Catches/stumpings	0/0
- Source: ESPNcricinfo, 28 September 2020

Inger Nielsen is a former women's cricketer for the Denmark women's national cricket team who played nine ODIs. She made her debut against the Netherlands in 1997, and played four matches during the 1997 Women's Cricket World Cup. Her last ODI outing was also against the Netherlands, on 21 July 1999. Nielsen's highest score in international cricket was seven not out, made against Ireland during the 1999 Women's European Cricket Championship, while he best bowling performance was against the Netherlands in 1998, when she took two wickets for 16 runs. In all, she scored 21 runs and took four wickets for Denmark. Her sister, Susanne Nielsen, also played international cricket for Denmark.
