= Arthur Gregory (cricketer) =

Australian cricketer

Personal information
- Born: 7 July 1861; Sydney, Australia
- Died: 17 August 1929 (aged 68); Chatswood, Sydney
- Relatives: Ned Gregory(brother); Dave Gregory (brother); Charles Smith Gregory (brother); Syd Gregory (nephew); Louisa Caroline Gregory (niece); Charles William Gregory (nephew); Jack Gregory (nephew)

Arthur Gregory (7 July 1861 – 17 August 1929) was an Australian cricketer. He played six first-class matches for New South Wales between 1880/81 and 1888/89. He was also a journalist.

He came from a cricketing family, his six brothers included Ned, Dave, and Charles. His brother Ned's children were also notable cricketers, Syd, Louisa, and Charles Gregory, and his brother Charles' son was Jack Gregory.

== See also ==
- List of New South Wales representative cricketers
