= Lindsay Tuckett =

South African cricketer

Personal information
- Born: 6 February 1919; Durban, Natal, South Africa
- Died: 5 September 2016 (aged 97); Bloemfontein, Free State, South Africa
- Batting: Right-handed
- Bowling: Right-arm medium-fast

International information
- National side: South Africa
- Test debut: 7 June 1947 v England
- Last Test: 5 March 1949 v England

Career statistics
Competition	Test	First-class
Matches	9	61
Runs scored	131	1,496
Batting average	11.90	17.60
100s/50s	0/0	1/4
Top score	40*	101
Balls bowled	2,104	13,097
Wickets	19	225
Bowling average	51.57	23.07
5 wickets in innings	2	18
10 wickets in match	0	2
Best bowling	5/68	8/32
Catches/stumpings	9/–	38/–
- Source: Cricinfo, 7 December 2022

Lindsay Tuckett (6 February 1919 – 5 September 2016) was a South African cricketer who played in nine Test matches from 1947 to 1949.

== Biography ==
The son of one Test player, Len Tuckett, and the nephew of another, Joe Cox, Lindsay Tuckett was just a month past his 16th birthday when he made his first-class cricket debut for Orange Free State in March 1935. A lower-order right-handed batsman and a fast-medium right-arm bowler who specialised in in-swingers, he took regular wickets for one of the weaker provincial sides for the next 20 years, but had a much shorter career in Tests.

Picked for the 1947 South African tour of England, he began promisingly, and even though he strained a muscle in the first Test and was less effective afterwards, he was picked for all five Tests and finished with 15 wickets, the joint highest number for the side. In the first innings of the first match at Trent Bridge, he took five England wickets for 68 runs and it was a dropped catch off his bowling in the second innings that, according to the report in the 1948 Wisden, allowed England to escape from the match with a draw after following on 325 runs behind. At Lord's in the second Test, he again took five wickets in the first innings, this time for 115 runs as England amassed 554 runs with centuries by Bill Edrich and Denis Compton. On the 1947 tour as a whole, Tuckett took 69 wickets at an average of 25 runs per wicket.

When the Marylebone Cricket Club toured South Africa in the 1948–49 season, Tuckett was again chosen as an opening bowler in four out of the five Tests, but could not repeat his form of 18 months earlier. He took only four wickets in the series and did not play for South Africa again. In the first Test, he bowled the last possible over of the match, and on the eighth and final ball England's ninth wicket pair of Alec Bedser and Cliff Gladwin scrambled the single run that gave the touring side victory.

Following the death of Norman Gordon on 2 September 2014, Tuckett was the oldest living Test cricketer. He died on 5 September 2016 at the age of 97.

== See also ==
- List of South Africa cricketers who have taken five-wicket hauls on Test debut

Records
Preceded by Norman Gordon	Oldest living Test cricketer 2 September 2014 – 5 September 2016	Succeeded by John Watkins
