= Syd Gregory =

Australian cricketer (1870–1929)

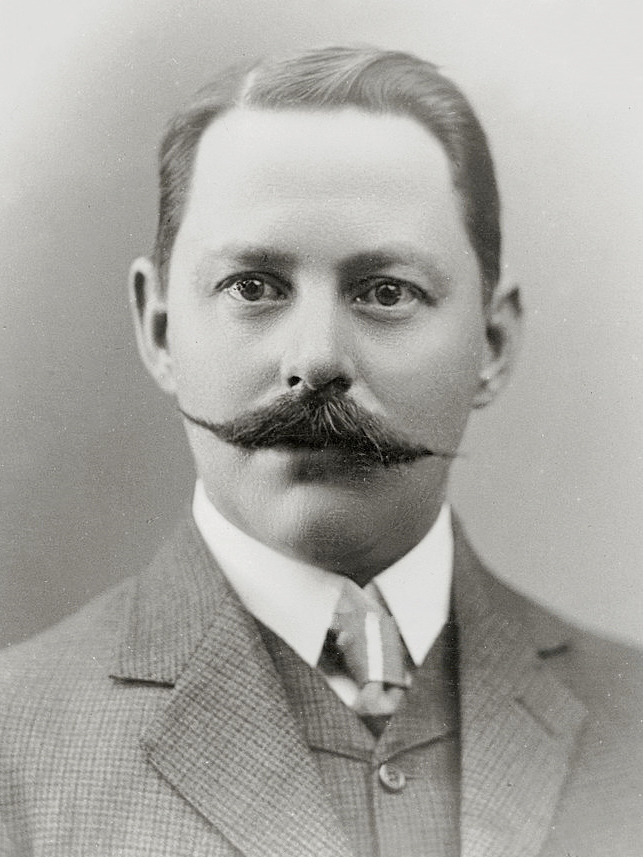
- Gregory in 1896

Personal information
- Full name: Sydney Edward Gregory
- Born: 14 April 1870; Randwick, New South Wales, Australia
- Died: 1 August 1929 (aged 59); Randwick, New South Wales, Australia
- Nickname: Little Tich
- Height: 1.64 m (5 ft 5 in)
- Batting: Right-handed
- Role: Batsman
- Relatives: Ned Gregory (father); Charles William Gregory (brother); Louisa Caroline Gregory (sister); Charles Smith Gregory (uncle); Dave Gregory (uncle); Arthur Gregory (uncle); Jack Gregory (cricketer) (cousin)

International information
- National side: Australia (1890–1912)
- Test debut (cap 58): 21 July 1890 v England
- Last Test: 19 August 1912 v England

Domestic team information
- Years: Team
- 1889/90–1911/12: New South Wales

Career statistics
Competition	Test	First-class
Matches	58	369
Runs scored	2,282	15,188
Batting average	24.53	28.54
100s/50s	4/8	25/65
Top score	201	201
Balls bowled	30	599
Wickets	0	2
Bowling average	–	195.00
5 wickets in innings	–	0
10 wickets in match	–	0
Best bowling	–	1/8
Catches/stumpings	25/–	174/–
- Source: CricketArchive, 8 May 2012

Sydney Edward Gregory (14 April 1870 – 1 August 1929), sometimes known as Edward Sydney Gregory, was a cricketer who played for New South Wales and Australia. At the time of his retirement, he had played a world-record 58 Test matches during a career spanning 1890 to 1912. A right-handed batsman, he was also a renowned fielder, particularly at cover point.

== Early life and education ==
Gregory was born at Moore Park, New South Wales, not far from the present site of the Sydney Cricket Ground, attending Sydney Boys High School. The Gregorys were Australia's first cricketing dynasty. Gregory's father Ned Gregory was one of the eleven Australians selected to play in a match against England at the MCG in 1877 – a match later designated as the first-ever Test. Ned Gregory served as curator at the SCG, occupying this position at the time of the birth of his son. Gregory's uncle Dave was Australia's first Test cricket captain, and his cousin Jack was the nation's most feared fast bowler of the 1920s.

His brother Charles was also a cricketer of note, as were his sisters Nellie, Louisa, Alice and Gertrude who were all players and founders of women's cricket in Australia. Two other cricketing uncles were Charles and Arthur.

== Career ==
Gregory made his first-class debut for New South Wales in the season of 1889–90. Six months later, he was selected to tour England with the Australian team. Altogether, Gregory toured England a further seven times – in 1893, 1896, 1899, 1902, 1905, 1909 and finally in 1912 – and South Africa once (1902). He is one of only three cricketers to have batted in every position of the batting order, from one to eleven, in his Test career.

Gregory scored Australia's first double hundred in a Test in Australia in 1894–95 but his 201 was not enough to save his team from a remarkable defeat. They made England follow on after amassing 586 but the visitors then made 437 and bowled Australia out for 166 to pull off an astonishing victory by 10 runs. It was the first time a Test had been won by a team that had been asked to follow on and remained the only occurrence until the famous Headingley Test in 1981.

In 1912, six of Australia's leading cricketers – including captain Clem Hill – refused to tour England for the inaugural Triangular Test series. A largely untried team, led by Gregory, was selected in its place. Although Australia lost only one of its six Tests, the cricket was overshadowed by the Australian team's poor behaviour. Gregory was heavily criticised for his inability to control the off-field antics of members of his team.

Away from cricket, Gregory was initially employed by the postal service before opening a "men's shop" – containing a tobacconist, barber and sporting store among others – with two business partners in Sydney's King Street in the mid-1890s. In 1896, he married a woman named Maria Sullivan. When his business failed in 1902, Gregory was forced to take a clerical job at the Water Board.

Gregory played a season of lacrosse for North Sydney in 1901 as a winter sport, but did not continue the next season due to the Australian cricket team's tour to England.

== Death ==
Gregory died on 1 August 1929 at Randwick, an eastern suburb of Sydney. He was 59.

== Career highlights ==
- Test debut: vs. England at Lord's, London, 21–23 July 1890.
- Final Test: vs. England at The Oval, London, 19–22 August 1912.
- Highest Test score: 201 vs. England at the Sydney Cricket Ground, 14–20 December 1894. This was the first instance in which a double-century was scored in a Test on an Australian cricket ground.
- Captaincy record: Gregory captained Australia six times, winning two and losing one (three drawn).
- One of Wisden's five Cricketers of the Year in 1897.
- Played the most Test matches by a non-Englishman at Lord's.
- One of only three players (the others being Wilfred Rhodes, and Vinoo Mankad) to have batted in every position in the batting order in Test cricket.

== Assessment ==
In 1948 the New Zealander Dan Reese made this assessment of Gregory as a cover-point:

From Vernon Royle to Hobbs, England has had many fine cover-points, but none to equal Australia's Syd. Gregory. A delightful story that Vernon Ransford told us on one of his visits to New Zealand gives the best flash-light picture one could get of the quickness of movement and unerring aim of little Syd. It was in a match at Lord's when a well-known English amateur hit a ball firmly between mid-off and cover-point, and in his cultured voice called, "Come one – perhaps two," but he was thrown out before even one run had been scored!

== See also ==
- List of Test or One-day International cricket families
- List of New South Wales representative cricketers

== Sources ==
- Perry, Roland (2000). Captain Australia: A history of the celebrated captains of Australian Test cricket. Sydney: Random House. ISBN 1-74051-174-3.

== Gallery ==
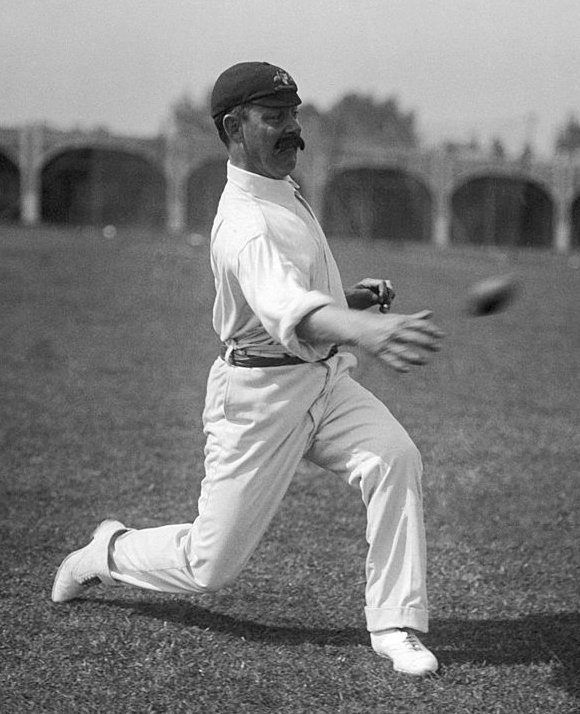

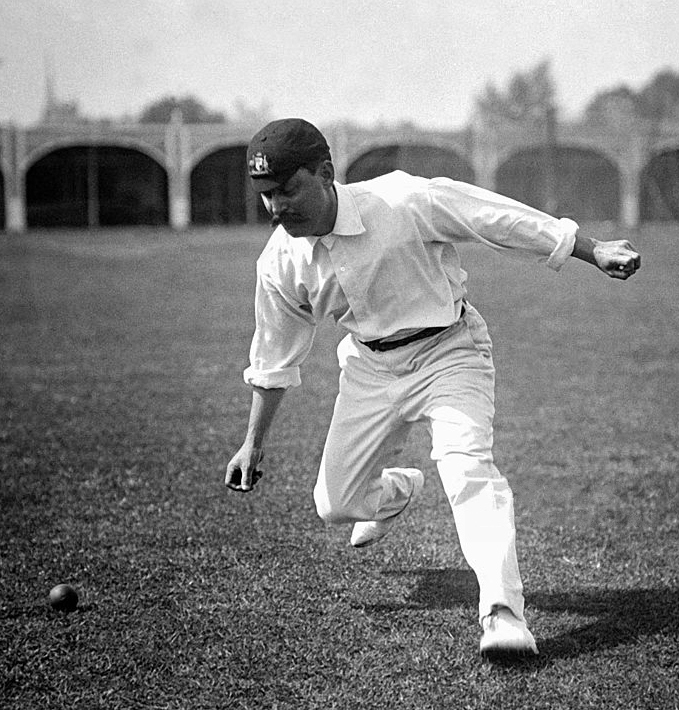

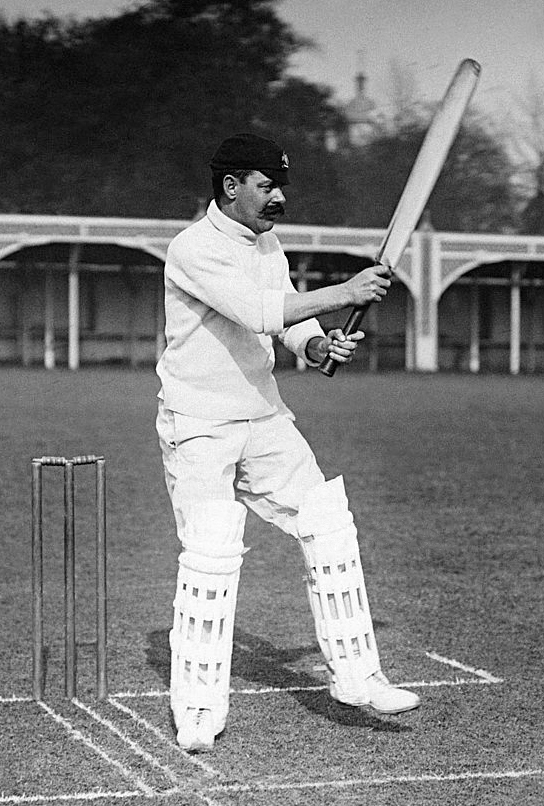

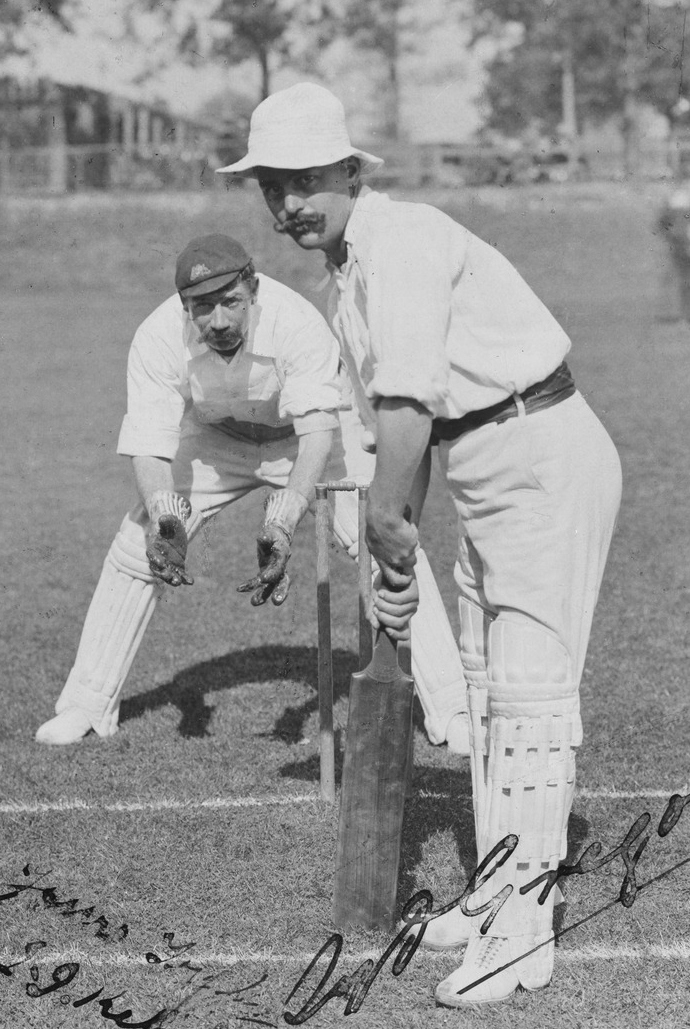

Preceded by Clem Hill	Australian Test cricket captains 1912	Succeeded by Warwick Armstrong
