= Susanne Nielsen =

Danish cricketer

Personal information
- Full name: Susanne Nielsen
- Role: Bowler
- Relatives: Inger Nielsen (sister)

International information
- National side: Denmark
- ODI debut (cap 8): 19 July 1989 v Ireland
- Last ODI: 21 July 1999 v Netherlands

Domestic team information
- Years: Team
- NCC

Career statistics
Competition	WODI
Matches	32
Runs scored	167
Batting average	7.95
100s/50s	0/0
Top score	35*
Balls bowled	1665
Wickets	32
Bowling average	27.56
5 wickets in innings	0
10 wickets in match	0
Best bowling	4/9
Catches/stumpings	6/–
- Source: Cricinfo, 26 September 2020

Susanne Nielsen is a Danish former international cricketer who represented the Denmark women's national team between 1993 and 1999. Her sister, Inger Nielsen, also played for Denmark.

She holds the undesirable distinction of scoring the most ducks in Women's Cricket World Cup history (6).

Nielsen played domestic cricket for Nykøbing Mors Cricket Club. As of 1995 she worked as a medical secretary.
