= Ned Gregory =

Australian cricketer

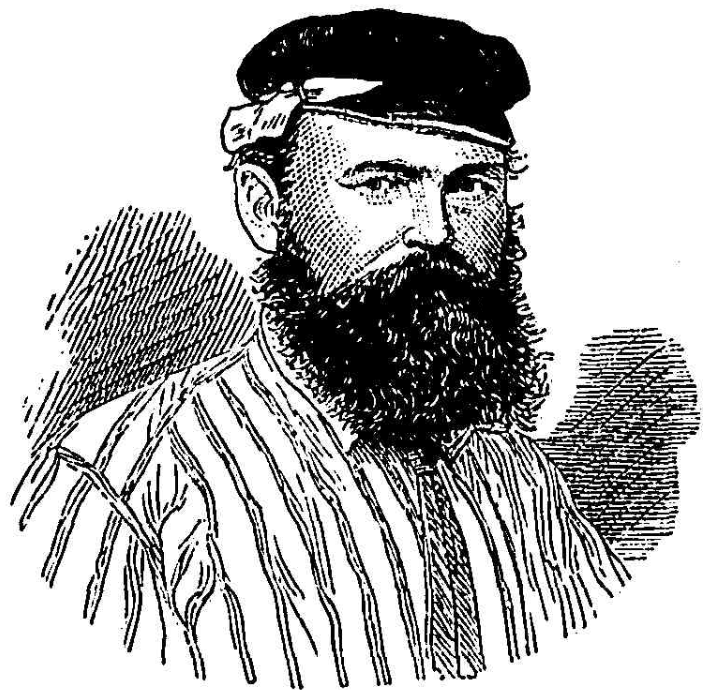

Personal information
- Full name: Edward James Gregory
- Born: 29 May 1839; Waverley, New South Wales, Australia
- Died: 22 April 1899 (aged 59); Randwick, New South Wales, Australia
- Batting: Right-handed
- Relatives: Arthur Gregory(brother); Dave Gregory (brother); Charles Smith Gregory (brother); Syd Gregory (son); Louisa Caroline Gregory (daughter); Charles William Gregory (son); Jack Gregory (nephew)

International information
- National side: Australia
- Only Test (cap 6): 15 March 1877 v England

Career statistics
Competition	Test	First-class
Matches	1	16
Runs scored	11	470
Batting average	5.50	17.40
100s/50s	0/0	0/2
Top score	11	65*
Catches/stumpings	1/–	11/–
- Source: Cricinfo, 17 November 2022

Edward James Gregory (29 May 1839 – 22 April 1899) was an Australian cricketer who played in the first recognised Test in 1877 between Australia and England in Melbourne.

He came from a cricketing family, his brothers included Arthur, Dave, and Charles. His children were also notable, Syd, Louisa, and Charles Gregory, and his brother Charles' son was Jack Gregory.

Ned was also father-in-law of Harry Donnan. In the latter part of his life, he was custodian of the Association ground at Sydney (later to be known as the Sydney Cricket Ground) after building the scoreboard there.

Ned Gregory and Nat Thomson are indicated by Wisden to have been born on the same day, and thus were jointly the earliest-born Australian Test cricketers.

== See also ==
- One Test Wonder

Preceded by James Southerton	Oldest Living Test Cricketer; 16 June 1880 – 22 April 1899	Succeeded by Tom Emmett
Notes and references
1. Jointly with Nat Thomson until Thomson's death on 2 September 1896
