= Louisa Caroline Gregory =

Australian cricketer (1865–1903)

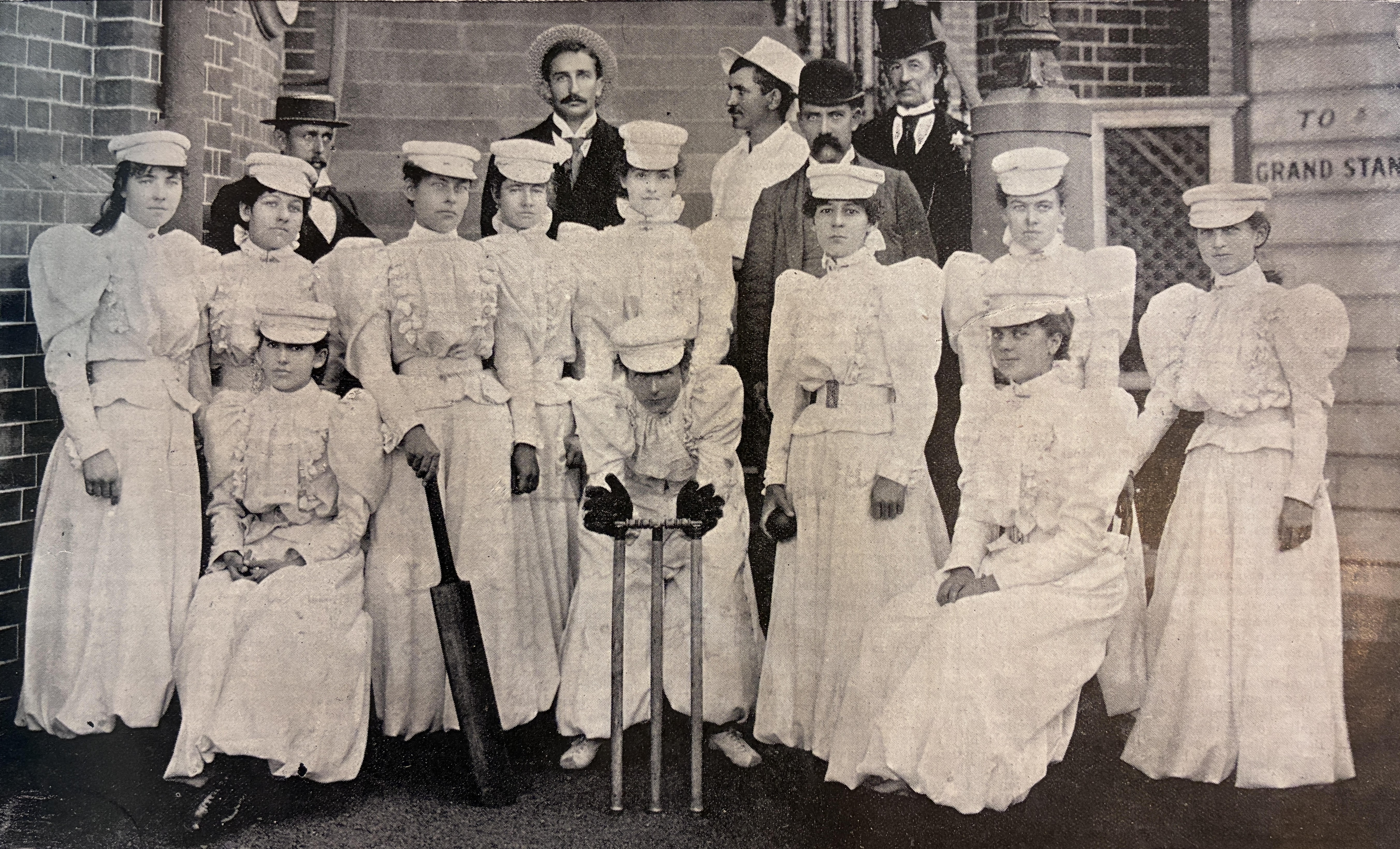
- Born: 30 April 1865; Bathurst, New South Wales, Australia
- Died: 17 February 1903 (aged 37); Parramatta, New South Wales, Australia
- Other name: Louisa Caroline Varley
- Years active: 1886 – 1903
- Spouse: James Varley (m. 1887)
- Children: 3
- Parents: Ellen Mainwaring; Ned Gregory
- Relatives: Syd Gregory (brother); Nellie Gregory (sister); Alice Gregory (sister); Gertrude Gregory (sister); Charles William Gregory (brother); Dave Gregory (uncle); Charles Smith Gregory (uncle); Arthur Gregory (uncle); Jack Gregory (cousin)

Louisa Caroline Gregory (30 April 1865 – 17 February 1903), known in later life as Louisa Varley, was an Australian cricketer who lived in Sydney, New South Wales. She was one of the founders of Australian women's cricket, playing, coaching, and forming teams in the late 19th century, and played in the first recognised women's cricket games played at the Sydney Cricket Ground (SCG) in 1886.

== Early life ==
Her mother Ellen Manwaring had immigrated from England in 1857, and her father Ned Gregory was born in the New South Wales colony. Ned and his younger brother Dave played in the first official Australian team in a Test cricket match against England. Ned's three other brothers, including Charles and Arthur, were also cricketers.

Gregory was born Louisa Caroline Gregory on 30 April 1865 in Bathurst. Her parents and older sister were living there for Ned's professional career playing cricket. The family returned to Paddington in Sydney before 1868.

With their father becoming the first curator of the SCG, or the Association Ground, as it was known at the time, Gregory and all of her siblings became cricket players. Her sisters Nellie, Alice, and Gertrude all played in the women's cricket matches with her, and their two brothers Charles and Syd, became notable cricketers in the men's events. Their cousin Jack, the son of their uncle Charles, also became a notable player.

== Cricket career ==
Along with her sister Nellie, Gregory established women's cricket in Australia, forming teams and coaching players, despite some areas of society of the time disapproving of women playing the sport.

On 8 March 1886, Gregory captained the Fernleas, in the first recognised women's game played at the SCG where they played against the Siroccos, which was captained by her sister Nellie. The game was played for charity, and it was approximated that there were 3500 spectators. The game was accompanied by the performance of the Permanent Artillery band. Gregory took six wickets for 14 runs in the first innings, then 3 for 25 in the second, losing out to her sister Nellie's 8 for 37, and 6 for 12.

Despite the impressive performance, the women's teams were not taken seriously at the time, and their games were seen as novelty fundraiser events, such as a time they played against 'The Actors', a team of performer from the JC Williamson theatrical company who were dressed in costumes from their performances. The early matches they played raised money for charities such as the Bulli Widows and Orphans fund, which was set up to help the families of the 81 men who died in an explosion at Bulli Colliery in January 1887.

At that time there were strong public opinions against women playing sports. People wrote to the papers stating their disapproval, and expressed concern that the women may flash their legs in public. There were also debates about the health effects of women playing cricket, such as one article warning women away from playing cricket due to:

"...the risks resulting from the blow of a cricket ball on the mammary gland and its possible consequences. What has hitherto been called ' the manly art ' will, we hope, remain as at present in this country — an exercise for the display of masculine prowess and agility."

Even while reporting on the fixtures of the games in detail, and the skill of the players, one article questioned the appropriateness of women playing cricket:

"The game was a novelty and therefore attractive. The cricket shown was far above mediocrity, but whether such exhibitions are healthful is open to doubt."

Despite the public opinions, and the tendency of the press to express surprise at their skills, and to attribute the credit to their male family members, the Gregory women continued to take the sport seriously. They trained twice per day in the lead up to a match. Gregory was known as a great all rounder cricketer, gaining note as a slow bowler and wicket keeper. Her wicket keeping, a contemporary report stated, was "sharp, clean and decisive, few balls being allowed to pass her". She also contributed to the administration of the sport, becoming the secretary of the Sydney Ladies’ Cricket Club.

== Later life and death ==
Gregory married cricketer James Varley and had three children. Gregory experienced poor mental health, and while receiving treatment at an asylum she contracted tuberculosis. She died of the disease at the Parramatta Hospital for the Insane, at the age of 37 on 17 February 1903. Her children continued her legacy, with her daughters both competing in local and interstate cricket with their aunt Nellie, and their cousins.
