= Richard Webb (cricketer) =

New Zealand cricketer (born 1952)

Personal information
- Full name: Richard John Webb
- Born: 15 September 1952 (age 74); Invercargill, Southland, New Zealand
- Batting: Right-handed
- Bowling: Right-arm fast-medium
- Role: Bowler
- Relatives: Murray Webb (brother)

International information
- National side: New Zealand
- ODI debut (cap 44): 13 February 1983 v Australia
- Last ODI: 23 February 1983 v England

Domestic team information
- Years: Team
- 1975/76–1983/84: Otago

Career statistics
Competition	ODI	FC	LA
Matches	3	25	20
Runs scored	6	79	24
Batting average	–	4.38	4.80
100s/50s	0/0	0/0	0/0
Top score	6*	14*	7*
Balls bowled	161	3,852	1,071
Wickets	4	67	26
Bowling average	26.25	27.79	22.61
5 wickets in innings	0	2	0
10 wickets in match	0	0	0
Best bowling	2/28	6/20	4/17
Catches/stumpings	0/–	12/–	6/–
- Source: CricInfo, 21 January 2017

Richard John Webb (born 15 September 1952) is a former New Zealand cricketer who played in three One Day Internationals (ODIs) for the national team in 1983. He played as a fast-medium paced bowler. He played domestic cricket for Otago between the 1975–76 season and 1983–84.

Webb was born at Invercargill in 1952. He played age-group cricket for Otago from the 1970–71 season and played for the New Zealand Universities between 1971–72 and 1973–74, also representing the New Zealand under-23 national team in the latter season. He made his senior debut for Otago the following season, playing two List A matches as an opening bowler, taking a wicket in each. He made his first-class cricket debut the following season and played 25 first-class and 17 List A matches for the team in a career which lasted until the end of the 1983–84 season.

== International career ==
Following a hamstring injury to Richard Hadlee during the 1982–83 Australian Tri-Series, Webb was flown in as an emergency replacement bowler in February 1983 on the day before the second match in the best-of-three final, and made his One Day International debut the following day against Australia. Webb opened the bowling, taking two wickets in nine overs―finishing with the best figures for New Zealand―and scored six not out as New Zealand lost the match and the final series.

He retained his place in the team for the first two ODIs against England, the third team in the tri-series, during their brief tour of New Zealand which followed the tri-series. Webb went wicketless in the first match and took two wickets, including the final wicket of the match, in the second match. He did not play in the final match of the series and was not selected again for the national team.

Webb's older brother, the caricaturist Murray Webb, also played cricket as a fast bowler for Otago. He played in three Test matches for New Zealand between 1971 and 1974.
