= Stanley Snooke =

South African cricketer (1878–1959)

Cricket information
- Batting: Right-handed

International information
- National side: South Africa
- Only Test: 19 August 1907 v England

Career statistics
Competition	Test	First-class
Matches	1	32
Runs scored	0	798
Batting average	0.00	16.62
100s/50s	0/0	0/4
Top score	0	74
Balls bowled	–	516
Wickets	–	19
Bowling average	–	11.78
5 wickets in innings	–	1
10 wickets in match	–	1
Best bowling	–	7/29
Catches/stumpings	2/–	31/–
- Source: CricketArchive, 14 November 2022

Stanley de la Courtte Snooke (11 November 1878 – 6 April 1959) was a South African cricketer who played in one Test match in 1907.

His brother, Tip, also played Test cricket for South Africa.
