= Mohammad Ilyas =

Mohammad or Muhammad Ilyas may refer to:

- Chaudhary Mohammad Ilyas (born 1954), Indian politician
- Sheikh Mohammad Illias (born 1958), West Bengali politician
- Mohammad Ilyas (cricketer) (1946–2026), Pakistani Test cricketer
- Mohammad Ilyas (cricketer, born 1996), Pakistani cricketer for Lahore Blues
- Mohammad Ilyas (cricketer, born 1999), Pakistani cricketer for Peshawar
- Muhammad Ilyas Qadri (born 1950), founder of Dawat-e-Islami
- Muhammad Ilyas Kandhlawi (1885–1944), founder of Tablighi Jamaat
- Muhammad Ilyas Kashmiri (1964–2011), senior al-Qaeda operative
- Muhammad Ilyas (politician) (1911–1970), Indonesian diplomat
