= Jack Gregory (cricketer) =

Australian cricketer

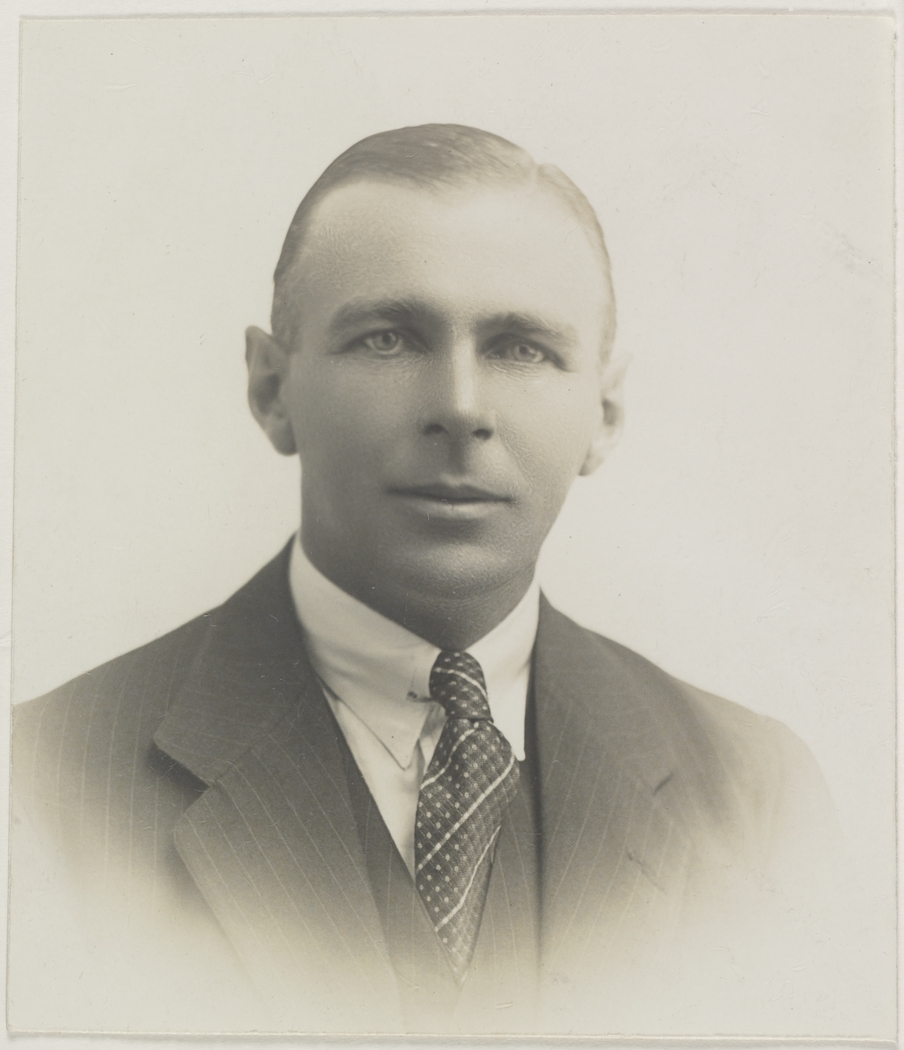
- Gregory, c. 1925

Personal information
- Full name: Jack Morrison Gregory
- Born: 14 August 1895; North Sydney, New South Wales, Australia
- Died: 7 August 1973 (aged 77); Bega, New South Wales, Australia
- Batting: Left-handed
- Bowling: Right arm fast
- Relatives: Charles Smith Gregory (father); Ned Gregory (uncle); Dave Gregory (uncle); Arthur Gregory (uncle); Syd Gregory (cousin); Louisa Caroline Gregory (cousin); Charles William Gregory (cousin)

International information
- National side: Australia
- Test debut (cap 107): 17 December 1920 v England
- Last Test: 5 December 1928 v England

Domestic team information
- Years: Team
- 1920/21–1928/29: New South Wales

Career statistics
Competition	Test	First-class
Matches	24	129
Runs scored	1,146	5,659
Batting average	36.96	36.50
100s/50s	2/7	13/27
Top score	119	152
Balls bowled	5,582	22,014
Wickets	85	504
Bowling average	31.15	20.99
5 wickets in innings	4	33
10 wickets in match	0	8
Best bowling	7/69	9/32
Catches/stumpings	37/–	195/–
- Source: CricketArchive, 1 February 2009

Jack Morrison Gregory (14 August 1895 – 7 August 1973) was an Australian cricketer.

As well as 129 first class matches for New South Wales he played in 24 Tests between 1920 and 1928. He was known mainly as a fearsome right-arm fast bowler but he also achieved a batting average of 36.50 and 1146 runs including two centuries, batting left-handed and gloveless. He also batted without a box. His best bowling was 7/69 in an innings and 8/101 in a match at the 1920/21 Test against England at the MCG.

At the Johannesburg Test in 1921 he scored a century from 67 balls in 70 minutes, which was at the time the fastest hundred in the history of Test cricket in terms of both balls faced and minutes taken. The record stood until 1985 when Viv Richards managed the feat in 56 balls but it remains the record for the fastest hundred in terms of minutes. His record of 15 catches in the 1920–21 Ashes series still stands as the record for the most catches by a fielder in a Test series. A knee injury suffered in the 1928 Brisbane Test match brought his cricket career to an abrupt end.

== Recognition ==
He was Wisden Cricketer of the Year in 1922.

== Family ==
Jack was the third son of Charles Smith Gregory (1847–1935), who had a short first-class career. His uncles include the great Australian cricketers Dave (1845–1919), Ned Gregory (1839–1899), and Arthur Gregory (1861–1929) so Jack was a cousin of Syd Gregory (1870–1929), Charles William Gregory (1878–1910) and Louisa Caroline Gregory (1865–1903).

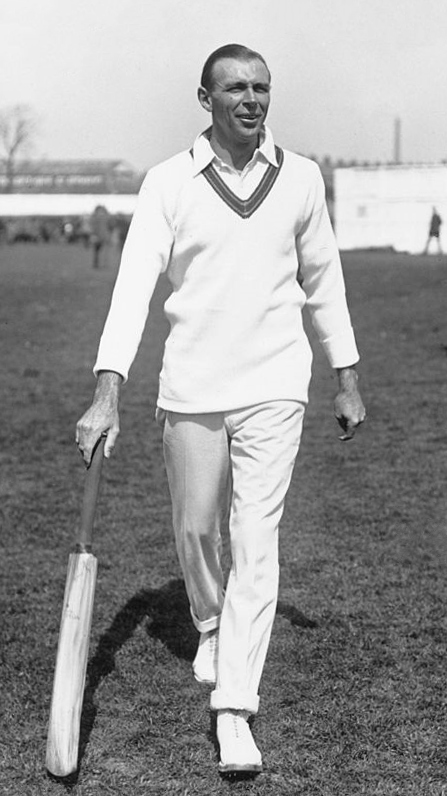
Gregory in 1921
