= Charles Smith Gregory =

Australian cricketer

Charles Gregory
Personal information
- Born: 5 June 1847; Wollongong, New South Wales, Australia
- Died: 5 April 1935 (aged 87); Chatswood, New South Wales, Australia
- Relatives: Jack Gregory (son); Ned Gregory(brother); Dave Gregory (brother); Arthur Gregory (brother); Syd Gregory (nephew); Louisa Caroline Gregory (niece); Charles William Gregory (nephew)

Charles Smith Gregory (5 June 1847 – 5 April 1935) was an Australian cricketer. He played two first-class matches for New South Wales between 1870/71 and 1871/72.

He was the father of Jack Morrison Gregory (14 August 1895 – 7 August 1973). He came from a cricketing family, his six brothers included Ned, Dave, and Arthur. His brother Ned's children, Syd, Louisa, and Charles, were also notable cricketers.

== See also ==
- List of New South Wales representative cricketers
