= Len Tuckett =

South African cricketer (1885–1963)

Personal information
- Full name: Lindsay Richard Tuckett
- Born: 19 April 1885; Durban, Colony of Natal
- Died: 8 April 1963 (aged 77); Bloemfontein, Orange Free State, South Africa
- Batting: Right-handed
- Bowling: Right-arm fast-medium

International information
- National side: South Africa

Career statistics
Competition	Tests	First-class
Matches	1	50
Runs scored	0	1,219
Batting average	0	18.19
100s/50s	0 / 0	0 / 4
Top score	0*	70
Balls bowled	120	8,344
Wickets	0	167
Bowling average	-	30.07
5 wickets in innings	0	9
10 wickets in match	0	1
Best bowling	-	7/70
Catches/stumpings	2 / 0	23 / 0
- Source: Cricinfo

Lindsay Richard 'Len' Tuckett (19 April 1885 – 8 April 1963) was a South African cricketer who played in one Test in 1914. He was the father of Lindsay who also played Test cricket. He played domestic cricket for Natal and Orange Free State.

Tuckett is part of one of the more unusual first-class batting records. Playing for the Orange Free State against Western Province at Bloemfontein in the 1925–26 Currie Cup, Tuckett was involved in a century partnership for the tenth wicket in each innings, the only time this has occurred in first-class cricket. Tuckett put on 115 runs in the first innings with Lancelot Fuller, and 129 runs in the second innings with Frank Caulfield. Orange Free State won by 46 runs.
