= Charles William Gregory =

Australian cricketer (1878-1910)

Charles Gregory
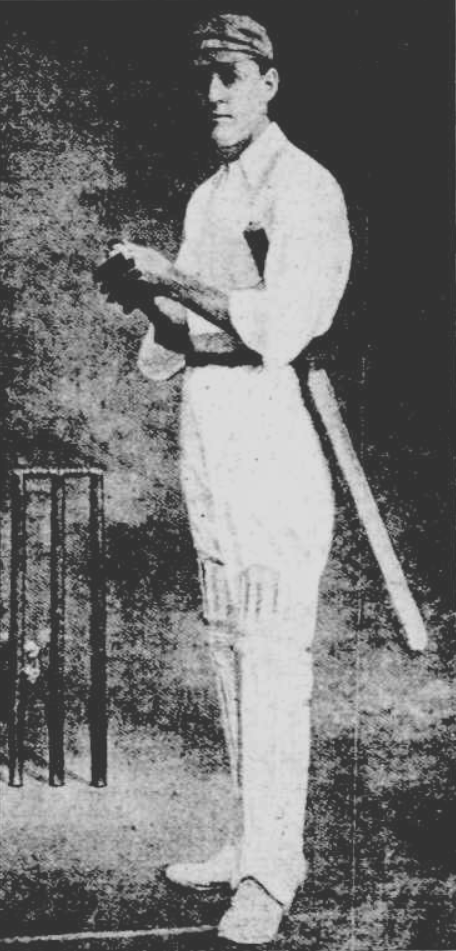

Personal information
- Born: 30 September 1878; Sydney, New South Wales, Australia
- Died: 14 November 1910 (aged 32); Darlinghurst, New South Wales, Australia
- Batting: Right-handed
- Relatives: Ned Gregory (father); Syd Gregory (brother); Louisa Caroline Gregory (sister); Charles Smith Gregory (uncle); Dave Gregory (uncle); Arthur Gregory (uncle); Jack Gregory (cricketer) (cousin)

Career statistics
Competition	First-class
Matches	31
Runs scored	1,546
Batting average	32.89
100s/50s	2/6
Top score	383
Balls bowled	12
Wickets	0
Bowling average	–
5 wickets in innings	–
10 wickets in match	–
Best bowling	–
Catches/stumpings	10/–
- Source: CricketArchive, 8 December 2022

Charles William Gregory (30 September 1878 – 14 November 1910) was an Australian cricketer who played for New South Wales.

In November 1906, Gregory scored 383 for New South Wales against Queensland, at the time an Australian record. It is also the highest score made by an Australian cricketer who has not played in a Test match.

Gregory was born in Sydney; he died at the age of 32 in the Sydney suburb of Darlinghurst.

Four of his relatives played Test cricket for Australia: his brother Syd won 58 caps, his cousin Jack 24, his uncle Dave three and his father Ned one. Two more uncles, Arthur and Charles, had short first-class careers. His sisters Nellie, Louisa, Alice and Gertrude were all players and founders of women's cricket in Australia.

Gregory died at the age of 32 in St Vincent's Hospital, Sydney of blood poisoning resulting from an abscess on the ear.
