= Tip Snooke =

South African cricketer

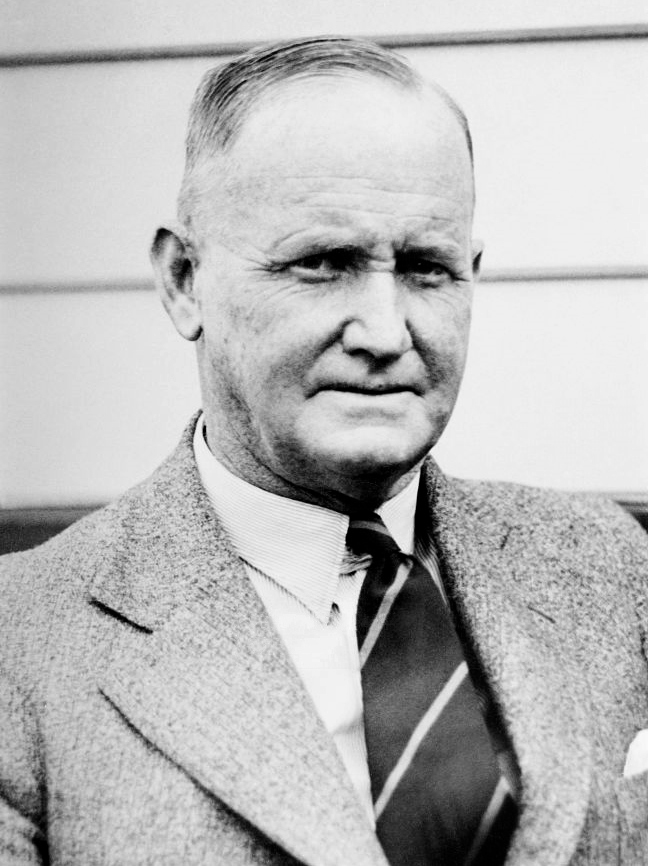
- Snooke as the manager of South Africa team in 1935

Personal information
- Full name: Sibley John Snooke
- Born: 1 February 1881; St Mark's, Cape Colony
- Died: 14 August 1966 (aged 85); Humewood, Port Elizabeth, South Africa
- Batting: Right-handed
- Bowling: Right-arm fast-medium

International information
- National side: South Africa
- Test debut: 2 January 1906 v England
- Last Test: 16 February 1923 v England

Career statistics
Competition	Test	First-class
Matches	26	124
Runs scored	1,008	4,821
Batting average	22.39	25.91
100s/50s	1/5	7/24
Top score	103	187
Balls bowled	1,620	6,179
Wickets	35	120
Bowling average	20.05	25.14
5 wickets in innings	1	3
10 wickets in match	1	1
Best bowling	8/70	8/70
Catches/stumpings	24/–	82/–
- Source: Cricinfo, 12 May 2022

Sibley John "Tip" Snooke (1 February 1881 – 14 August 1966) played Test cricket for South Africa as an all-rounder, captaining the side to victory 3–2 against England in a five-Test series in South Africa in 1909–10. He played in 26 Test matches, playing the first 23 between 1906 and 1912, and he was recalled aged 41 for three further Test matches against England in South Africa in 1922–23.

Snooke was born in St Mark's, Tembuland. He scored 1,008 Test runs at a batting average of 22.39, including one century against Australia at Adelaide in 1910–11, and took 35 Test wickets at a bowling average of 20.05, with best figures of 8/70 in an innings and 12/127 for a match, both against England at Johannesburg in 1905–06.

He played 124 first-class cricket matches for Border, Western Province and Transvaal, scoring 4,821 runs at an average of 25.91 and taking 120 wickets at an average of 25.14. He managed the successful South African side in England in 1935.

He died at Port Elizabeth, aged 85. His brother, Stanley Snooke, also played Test cricket for South Africa.
