= Kripa (disambiguation) =

Kripa is a character in Sanskrit epics of ancient India, a central character in the Mahabharata.

Kripa may also refer to:

- Kripa (given name), an Indian given name
- Kripa (philosophy), concept of divine grace in Hinduism
- Qutub-E-Kripa, en ensemble of Indian musicians

== See also ==
- Kirpa, an Indian masculine given name
- Kripal, an Indian masculine given name
  - Kirpal, a variant of the above
- Kirpan, a type of Indian dagger
- Kripalu Maharaj, an Indian religious leader
- Kripalu Center, a yoga retreat in Stockbridge, Massachusetts, United States
- Kripalu Dham, Mangarh, Hindu religious site in Uttar Pradesh
