= Kirpal =

Kirpal is a given name and a surname. Notable people with the name include:

- Bhupinder Nath Kirpal (born 1937), the 31st Chief Justice of India
- Irene Kirpal (1886–1977), Czech politician
- Neha Kirpal, the founder of the India Art Fair in 2008
- Sanjay Kirpal, Fijian politician, Member of the Parliament of Fiji
- Kirpal Nandra, British physicist, director at the Max Planck Institute for Extraterrestrial Physics
- Kirpal Singh (disambiguation), multiple people

== See also ==
- Sawan Kirpal Ruhani Mission, non-profit, spiritual organization
- Karpal
- Kerpel
