= Kirpal Singh (disambiguation) =

Kirpal Singh (1894–1974) was an Indian spiritual teacher (guru).

Kirpal Singh or Kripal Singh may also refer to:

- Kirpal Singh (admiral), Indian Navy admiral
- Kirpal Singh (politician), Indian member of the Lok Sabha
- Kirpal Singh (railway administrator), Indian railway administrator, recipient of the Padma Vibhushan in 1968
- Kirpal Singh (spy), Indian Army intelligence officer who discovered the planned Ghadar Mutiny
- A. G. Kripal Singh, Indian cricketer
- Arjan Kripal Singh, Indian cricketer
- Ram Kripal Singh, Indian politician

== See also ==
- Kripal, an Indian male given name
- Singh, an Indian surname
- Karpal Singh, Malaysian politician and lawyer
- Kirpal Singh Badungar, Indian politician
- Kirpal Singh Batth, Indian discus thrower
- Kirpal Singh Bhardwaj, Kenyan hockey player
- Kripal Singh Bisht or Mahant Avaidyanath, Indian politician
- Kirpal Singh Chugh, Indian nephrologist
- Kirpal Singh Narang, Indian educator
- Kripal Singh Shekhawat, Indian ceramic artist
