= Kripal =

Kripal and Kripalu are given names and surnames. Notable people with the names include:

- A. G. Kripal Singh (1933–1987), Indian Test cricketer
- Arjan Kripal Singh (born 1969), Indian cricketer
- Bhupinder Nath Kirpal (born 1937), 31st Chief Justice of India
- Jeffrey J. Kripal, Professor of Religious Studies at Rice University, Houston, Texas
- Kripal Singh Shekhawat (1922–2008), Indian craftsman
- Kripal Parmar, Indian politician
- Kripalu Maharaj, Hindu spiritual leader (1922–2013)
- Kripalvananda (1931–1981), Indian yoga master, namesake of the Kripalu Center in Stockbridge, Massachusetts

== See also ==
- Kirpal Singh (disambiguation)
- Karpal Singh, Malaysian politician and lawyer
