= St. Bede's Anglo Indian Higher Secondary School =

Location
- 37, Santhome High Road; Santhome; Chennai, India, Tamil Nadu, 600004; India; 13°2′3″N 80°16′42″E

Information
- Motto: "Doce Nos Viam Bonam" ("teach us the right way")
- Founded: 1907
- Administrator: Rev. Fr. Thamathiruthuvam, SDB
- Rector: Rev. Fr. DJ Saghayaraj, SDB
- Principal: Fr. Y.L. Irudayaraj, SDB
- Nickname: School of Our Hearts
- Affiliation: Tamil Nadu State Board
- Website: http://www.stbedeschennai.org/

St. Bede's is a higher secondary school in Chennai (Madras), Tamil Nadu, India, established in 1907 with the goal of providing Catholic education for children of European and Anglo-Indian descent. In 2014, the St.Bede's Academy Senior Secondary School started as a CBSE branch of this institution.

== History ==
=== Early years ===
St. Bede's School was established in 1907 as part of Lord Curzon's European education initiative for the whole of India. His Lordship the Bishop of Mylapore, Dom Theotonius Emmanuel Rebeiro Vieire de Castro, decided to start a school separate from San Thome High School. The school was initially located in Leland's Garden, a building on Santhome High Road. These premises were later taken over and eventually became part of the C.S.I School for the Deaf & Dumb. On 18 January 1907, St Bede's (then known as St. Bede's European High School) was inaugurated by Dom Theotonius Emmanuel Rebeiro Vieira de Castro.

The school initially began with six classes—Standard II to Standard VII—with M.I. Anacleto as its first Headmaster. Seventeen students from San Thome Orphanage, who were originally enrolled in San Thome High School, then joined the new school. Additionally, a new boarding school (The St. Bede's Boarding) was established with an initial enrollment of three students. In 1908, during Anacleto's leave, Salgado assumed the position of headmaster. A year later in 1909, the first ever high school class within the school had begun.

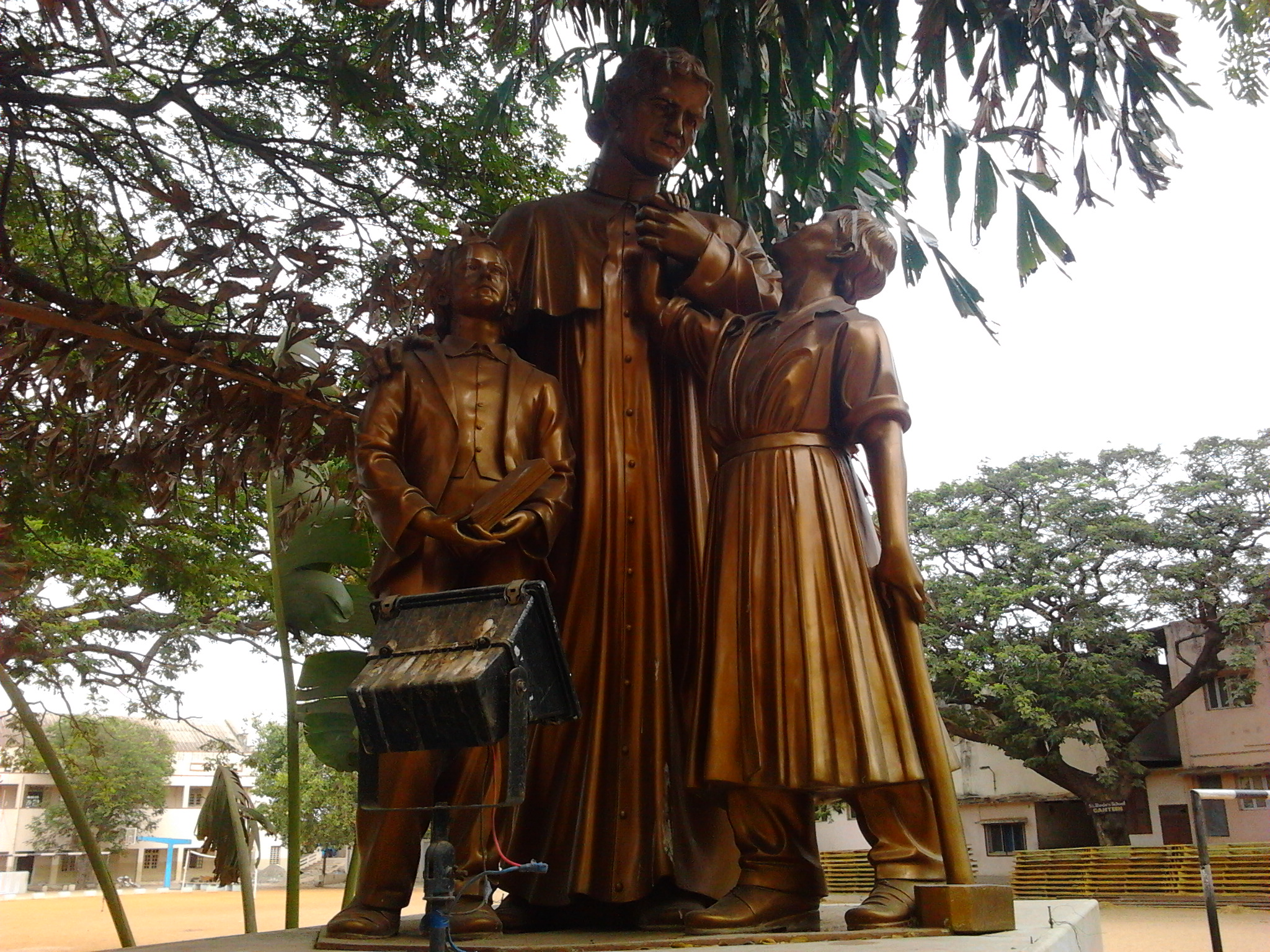
Don Bosco 'Father and Teacher of Youth' (statue inside the school)

The first batch of high school candidates from St. Bede's participated in the European High School Examination in December 1909. Joseph Sears attained first rank in the Madras Presidency but was later killed on the battlefields of France during the First World War.

=== 1933–1957 ===
In 1937, the School received recognition for Senior Cambridge.

On 12 March 1942, St Bede's was ordered to evacuate to Coimbatore. As accommodation was inadequate, St. Bede's decided to move to Tanjore. In August 1943, the Orphanage and Chapel was gutted by fire and the school at Madras was occupied by the military authorities. After the war, the military vacated the school. Classes started again on 10 July 1946.

In 1952, the two Dioceses of Madras and Mylapore were reorganized. Some portions of the old Mylapore Diocese were joined and the old Archdiocese of Madras formed the new Archdiocese of Madras and Mylapore, with The Most Dr. Louis Mathias as its first Archbishop. In 1954, Archbishop Dr. Louis Mathias gave orders to demolish the military sheds that were being used as classrooms and to complete the construction of the main block, one half of which had been completed in 1932 by Bishop Texeira.

=== 1958–present ===
In 1969, Stephen Bernard took over from Restelli as rector and Principal. R.E. Davey retired as Headmaster and G. D’Netto took over from him as the new headmaster. On Old Bedean, Davey served the school for 33 years, including eight years as Headmaster. On his retirement, he was honoured by Pope John Paul II with the award of "Pro Ecclesia et Pontifice". Joy Panackel took over as Rector in July 1973 from O. Harris. G. D’Netto retired in September and P.J. Sebastian took over as the Headmaster. D’Netto had put in 30 years of service.

The school changed its academic year from January—December to June—May in 1978 and also adopted the higher secondary (Std. XI and XII) in July 1978, offering the students three groups: Maths, Physics, Chemistry and Biology in Group I; Economics, Commerce, Accountancy and Maths in Group II; and Logic, Economics, Commerce and Accountancy in Group III. With the introduction of higher secondary courses, there was a need for additional classrooms and laboratories. To meet this requirement, a 3-storied extension to the main block was launched in 1979.

In 2014, the St.Bede's Academy Senior Secondary School was founded as a CBSE segment of this institution.Both the schools and the adjacent Dominic Savio School are administered by the St.Bede's community of Schools, the institution is named after Saint Bede of England.

== Centenary celebrations ==
Alumni of St. Bede's Anglo Indian Higher Secondary School were invited to the celebrations of the school's centenary on 26 January 2008. Close to 1,000 alumni had registered, members of the school administration said. A.P.J. Abdul Kalam, the then President and the Missile man of India, had inaugurated a stamp in commemoration of the centenary celebrations of the school.

The CBSE branch of the institution, St.Bede's Academy celebrated its first decade of existence on 1 February 2025.

== Notable alumni ==
- Surya Sivakumar (actor)
- Karthik Sivakumar (actor)
- Shahrukh Khan (cricketer)
- Vishnuvardhan (director)
- Karthik (actor)
- Radha Ravi (actor)
- Jeevan (actor)
- Sananth (actor)
- Karate R. Thiagarajan (President, Karate Association of India)
- Shankar (actor), Indian film actor
- Mahesh Babu (actor)
- K. E. Gnanavel Raja (film producer)
- Karthik Raja (music composer)
- Yuvan Shankar Raja (music composer)
- V. M. Muralidharan (Chairman, Ethiraj College for Women)
- Dinesh Karthik (cricketer)
- Venkat Prabhu (director)
- Premgi Amaren (playback singer, music composer, actor)
- Kreshna (actor)
- Vaibhav Reddy (actor)
- Krishnamachari Srikkanth (Indian ex-cricketer; studied in St. Bede's till 4th standard)
- Ravichandran Ashwin (cricketer)
- Abhinav Mukund (cricketer)
- Baba Aparajith (cricketer)
- Yo Mahesh (cricketer)
- A. G. Kripal Singh (cricketer)
- A.G. Milkha Singh (cricketer)
- Washington Sundar(cricketer)
