= Milkha =

Milkha is a given name. Notable people with the name include:

- A. G. Milkha Singh (born 1941), Indian Test cricketer
- Jeev Milkha Singh (born 1971), Indian golfer
- Milkha Singh (1929 – 2021), Indian athlete also known as "The Flying Sikh"
