= A. G. Ram Singh =

Indian cricketer

Personal information
- Full name: Amritsar Govindsingh Ram Singh
- Born: 14 July 1910
- Died: 11 August 1999 (aged 89)
- Batting: Left-handed
- Bowling: Slow left-arm orthodox
- Relatives: A. G. Kripal Singh (son); A. G. Milkha Singh (son); Arjan Kripal Singh (grandson)

Domestic team information
- Years: Team
- 1932/33–1946/47: Madras

Career statistics
Competition	First-class
Matches	56
Runs scored	3,314
Batting average	35.25
100s/50s	6/22
Top score	126
Balls bowled	10,826
Wickets	265
Bowling average	18.56
5 wickets in innings	24
10 wickets in match	8
Best bowling	8/14
Catches/stumpings	27/–
- Source: ESPNcricinfo, 9 June 2022

Amritsar Govindsingh Ram Singh (14 July 1910 – 11 August 1999) was an Indian first-class cricketer. An allrounder, he bowled slow left-arm orthodox and was a left-handed middle order batsman. His sons A. G. Kripal Singh and A. G. Milkha Singh played Test cricket for India.

Ram Singh played for Madras and was just the second player to achieve the Ranji Trophy double of 1000 runs and 100 wickets. He was the first bowler to take 5 wickets in an innings and 10 wickets in a match in the Ranji Trophy. He achieved that feat in November 1934, in the first match of the Ranji Trophy, playing for Madras against Mysore, and finishing with 11 wickets for 34. He took his best ever innings figures of 8 for 14 the next season, in a Madras Presidency Match, playing for the Indians against the Europeans, when he took 13 for 49 in the match and also hit 70, the highest score on either side.

He Coached cricket at Sir.M Venketasubbha Rao Boys School in T.Nagar Madras now (Chennai) during late 1970s & 1980s.
