= Kerbel =

Kerbel is a surname. Notable people with the surname include:

- Janice Kerbel (born 1969), British artist
- Joe Kerbel (1921–1973), American football coach
- Lev Kerbel (1917–2003), Soviet sculptor

== See also ==
- Kerber (surname)
- Kerpel
