= Karpal =

Karpal is a given name. Notable people with the given name include:

- Karpal Kaur Sandhu (1943–1973), Zanzibari-born British police officer
- Karpal Singh (1940–2014), Indian Malaysian politician and lawyer
