= Kerpel =

Kerpel is a surname. Notable people with the surname include:

- Aníbal Kerpel, Argentine producer and engineer
- Gaby Kerpel (born 1969), Argentine composer
- Nicolas De Kerpel (born 1993), Belgian field hockey player
- Tony Kerpel (born 1945), British politician and adviser

== See also ==
- Kerbel
