= Neha Kirpal =

Indian social and cultural entrepreneur

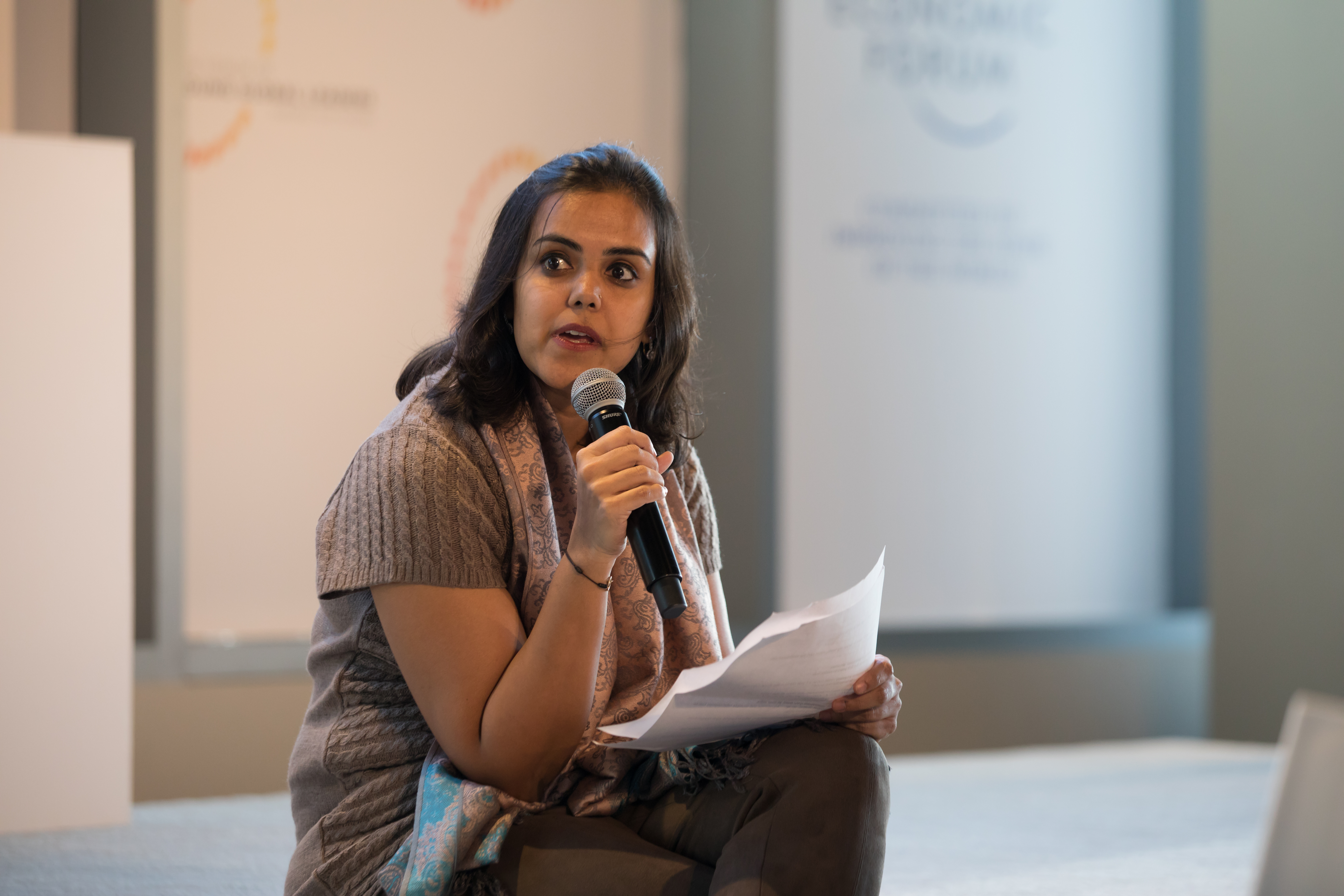
- Born: New Delhi, India
- Education: Lady Shri Ram College; University of the Arts London
- Occupation: Social entrepreneur
- Known for: Founding India Art Fair, Co-founding Amaha Health
- Awards: Nari Shakti Puraskar by Government of India (2015), Young Global Leader by World Economic Forum (2015)

Neha Kirpal is an Indian social entrepreneur. She is known for her work in the arts and mental health. She founded the India Art Fair in 2008, and she is a co-founder of Amaha, a mental health organization. She was awarded the Nari Shakti Puraskar, an annual award by the Ministry of Women and Child Development of the Government of India to individual women or institutions for work towards women empowerment.

== Early life and education ==
Neha Kirpal was born in New Delhi, India, where she spent her childhood. She attended Sardar Patel Vidyalaya school and later studied Political science at Lady Shri Ram College in Delhi. She was involved with SPIC MACAY during her school and university years. She has a master's degree in marketing from the University of the Arts London.

== Career ==
Kirpal founded the India Art Fair (formerly India Art Summit) in 2008. The fair is known for its focus on contemporary art. She was credited with reviving the art market in India. In August 2017, she resigned retaining a 10% stake in the company. After a decade, she sold her art business to Switzerland based MCH Group.

She served on the Federation of Indian Chambers of Commerce & Industry's (FICCI) National Advisory Committee for Art.

In 2019, Kirpal joined Amaha Health (formerly InnerHour) with Amit Malik. Amaha Health is a mental health organization providing therapy across India.

In 2024 she was the co-author of "Mental Health: Lived Experiences of Resilience and Hope" with Dr Nandini Murali.

== Awards ==
In 2012, Kirpal was included in India Today's list of 25 Power Women. In 2014 and 2015, Fortune India listed her in its 40 Under 40 list. In 2014, she received the Most Powerful Women Award from India Today. Business Today magazine named her a "Most Powerful Woman in Business" for 2012-14. In 2014, Kirpal was Art Entrepreneur of the Year at Forbes India Art Awards.

In 2015, she was awarded the Nari Shakti Puraskar. The award was presented by the Ministry of Women and Child Development, Government of India, and it was conferred upon her by India's president, Pranab Mukherjee on International Women's Day. In the same year she was named a Young Global Leader from India by the World Economic Forum and she was awarded the 2015 Indian of the Year award by NDTV. In 2017, Kirpal was in Apollo magazine's "40 Under 40 Global".

She is a fellow of Ananta Aspen Centre's Kamalnayan Bajaj Fellowship. In 2018, she was selected as an Eisenhower Innovation Fellow. CNBC TV18 mentioned her in 2024 at the second season of 'Future Female Forward' for promoting gender equality.
