= Kripa (given name) =

Kripa is a Hindic given name that may refer to

- Kripa Ram Barath, Rajasthani poet
- Kripa Sagar (1875–1939), Punjabi poet
- Kripa Shankar Patel Bishnoi (born 1977), Indian professional wrestler and coach
- Kripa Shankar Sharma, Hindi poet
- Kripashankar Singh, Indian politician
