= Kirpal Singh (politician) =

Indian politician

Kirpal Singh was an Indian politician and elected official. Formerly a member of the Janata Dal party, he was the founder and president of Punjab Janata Morcha. He was elected to the Lok Sabha as an independent after failing to get the nomination of Janata Dal.

Punjab Janata Morcha (PJM), in English the Punjab Popular Front, was a Sikh political party in the Indian state of Punjab. The party formed in 1989 as a splinter group of the Janata Dal. The party failed to win any election seats in its lifetime.

Party president Kirpal Singh announced that the PJM was disbanded in 1997. Most members joined the Jan Morcha by 2003.
