= A. G. Milkha Singh =

Indian cricketer

Personal information
- Full name: Amritsar Govindsingh Milkha Singh
- Born: 31 December 1941; Madras, Madras State, British India
- Died: 10 November 2017 (aged 75); Chennai
- Batting: Left-handed
- Bowling: Right-arm medium
- Relatives: A. G. Ram Singh (father); A. G. Kripal Singh (brother); Arjan Kripal Singh (nephew)

International information
- National side: India
- Test debut (cap 97): 13 January 1960 v Australia
- Last Test: 11 November 1961 v England

Career statistics
Competition	Test	First-class
Matches	4	88
Runs scored	92	4,324
Batting average	15.33	35.44
100s/50s	0/0	8/27
Top score	35	151
Balls bowled	6	410
Wickets	0	5
Bowling average	–	49.00
5 wickets in innings	–	0
10 wickets in match	–	0
Best bowling	–	2/22
Catches/stumpings	2/–	44/–
- Source: ESPNcricinfo, 16 March 2017

Amritsar Govindsingh Milkha Singh (31 December 1941 – 10 November 2017) was an Indian Test cricketer. Milkha Singh was a left-handed batsman and an occasional right arm medium pace bowler. He came from a famous cricketing family which also produced A. G. Ram Singh and his more successful brother A. G. Kripal Singh.

He was a brilliant schoolboy cricketer and his exploits led to a first-class debut at the age of 16. He represented South Zone Schools in the interzonal Cooch Behar Trophy and scored 114 in the final against West Zone. This led to the vice captaincy of the Indian Schools that toured Ceylon that year. Milkha, who studied at Loyola College, Chennai, was twice voted the best collegiate cricketer and represented university and state.

He played four Test matches. He made his debut in 1959–60 against the Australians, toured Pakistan in 1960-61 and played one Test against England in 1961–62. In the Test against England, the Indian team also included A.G. Kripal Singh and Vaman Kumar, the only instance when three Tamil Nadu players appeared in an Indian side. Milkha was only 19 when he played his last Test.

He scored more than 2,000 runs for Tamil Nadu in the Ranji Trophy and was the first player to score a century in the Duleep Trophy.

== Notes ==
- V. Ramnarayan, Mosquitos and other Jolly Rovers
