= Arjan Kripal Singh =

Indian cricketer

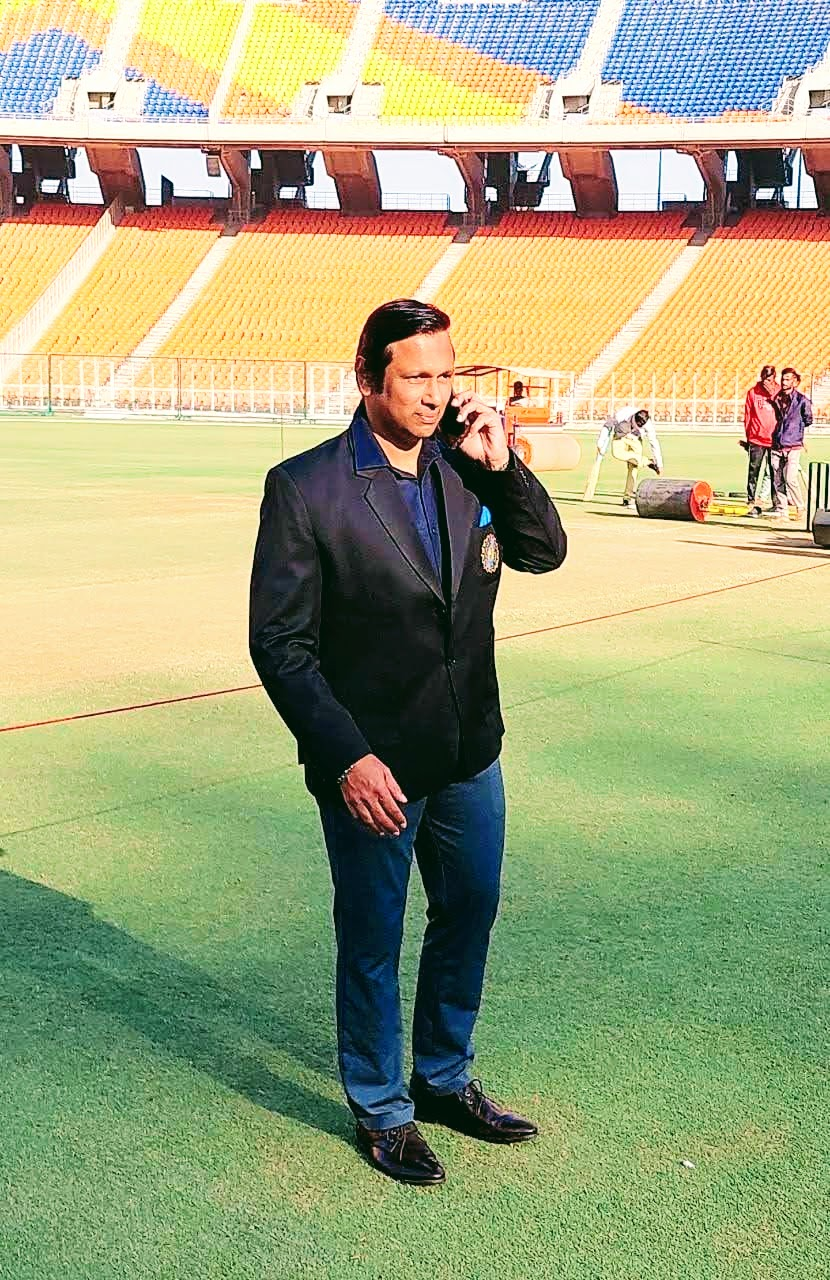

Personal information
- Born: 13 February 1969 (age 57); Madras (now Chennai), Tamil Nadu, India
- Batting: Right-handed
- Bowling: Right arm medium
- Role: Batsman
- Relatives: A. G. Ram Singh (grandfather); A. G. Kripal Singh (father); A. G. Milkha Singh (uncle)

Domestic team information
- Years: Team
- 1988/89–1994/95: Tamil Nadu
- FC debut: 19 November 1988 Tamil Nadu v New Zealanders
- Last FC: 15 February 1995 Tamil Nadu v Haryana
- LA debut: 12 March 1989 Tamil Nadu v Delhi
- Last LA: 12 March 1989 Tamil Nadu v Kerala

Career statistics
Competition	First-class	List A
Matches	31	3
Runs scored	1,495	39
Batting average	42.71	13.00
100s/50s	4/6	0/0
Top score	302*	20
Catches/stumpings	25/–	0/–
- Source: CricketArchive, 30 September 2008

Arjan Kripal Singh, is a former Indian cricketer, right handed batsman and a right arm medium- pace bowler. Singh performed well in the first class cricketing circuit and was selected for the inaugural World U-19 Cup in 1988 in Australia. He made his debut with Ranji Trophy in domestic cricket in the 1988/89 season and was vice captain of the tour in 1989–90. He holds a world record along with W V Raman, the only two batsman who have scored triple centuries in the same innings in first class cricket.

Singh hails from a family of cricketers with 9 members of his family having played in first class cricket circuit, probably the only family in the world to do so. Singh did not play in the international cricket arena and left domestic cricket after the 1995/96 season due to a knee surgery. Arjan is the second cousin of Indian off-spinner Sarandeep Singh, with his grandfather A. G. Ram Singh playing in two unofficial Test matches, his father A. G. Kripal Singh (14 Test matches) and uncle A. G. Milkha Singh (4 Test matches) representing India in Test cricket. Another uncle A.G. Satwender Singh played first class cricket for Madras cricket team and Tamil Nadu cricket team. His brother Swaran Kripal Singh played in domestic cricket briefly. His grandfather hailed from Amritsar, Punjab, settled down in Madras and played for the local team.

After his time in active cricket, he continues to be associated with the BCCI as one of the top match referees in India today.

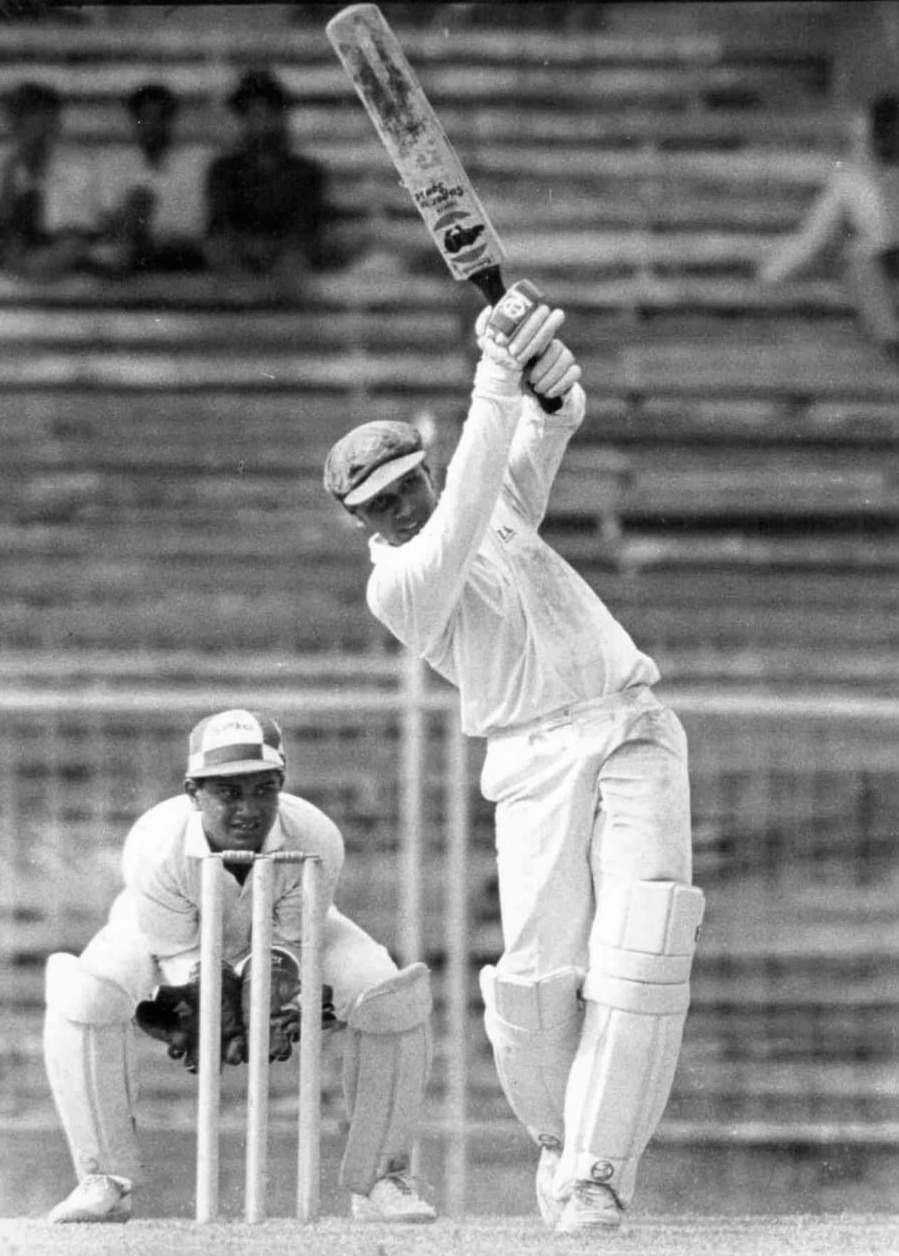

== Mountaineering ==
Singh enjoys travelling and he has visited over 55 countries so far, walked the Inca Trail in Peru, swum with whale sharks in Mexico, says that he encountered a great white shark in South Africa. He started one of south India's first adventure- travel companies, GetUpAndGo, in 2012. Singh organised treks to unique destinations. He has summited many 6000m peaks in the Himalayas and Kilimanjaro, 5895m above sea level. Singh has completed the Everest Base camp trek 5 times across seasons, also holding the record of being the only first class cricketer to do so successfully.

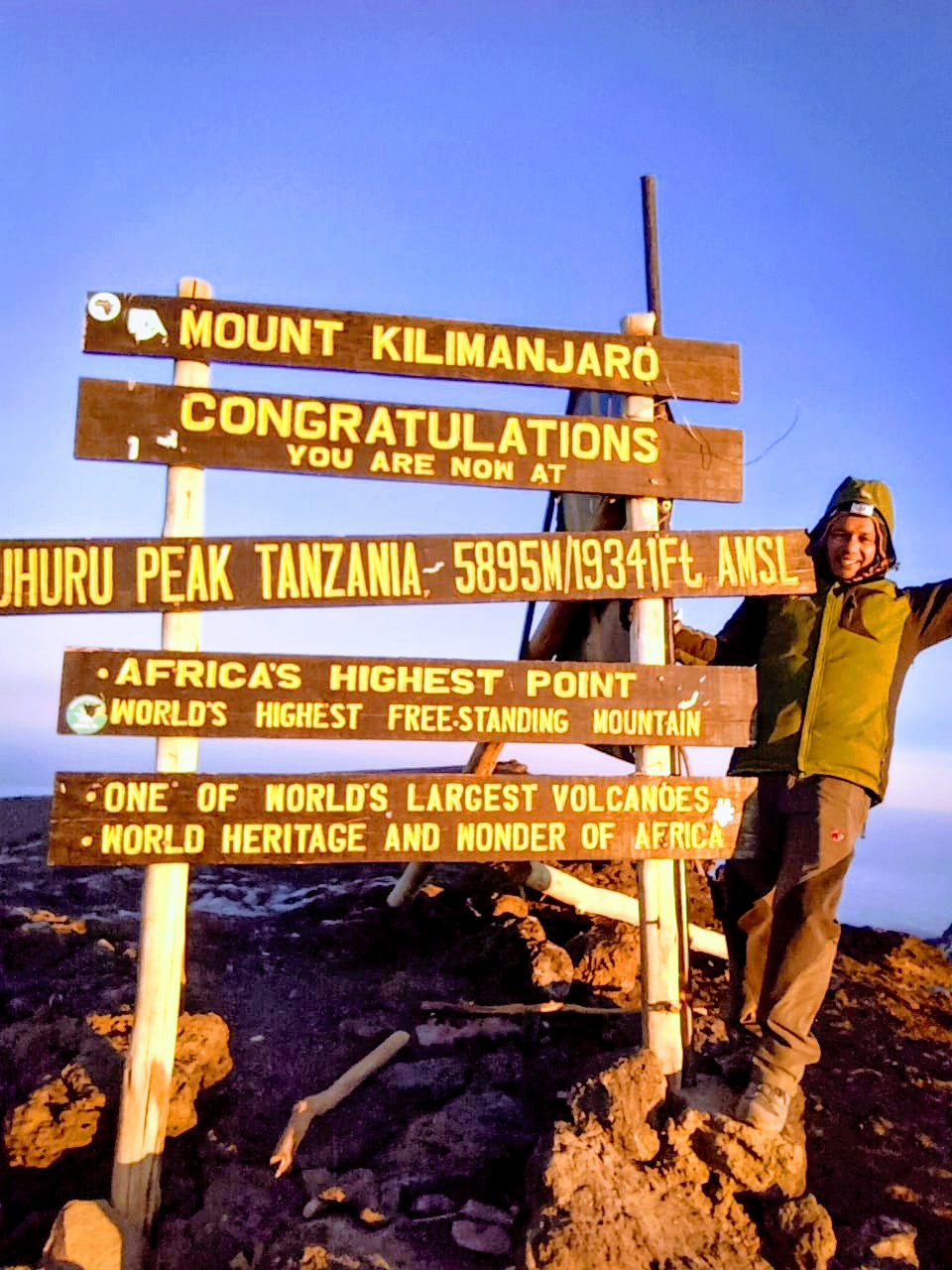

In 2022, he reached Yunam Peak in Himachal Pradesh at a height of 6111m.

Singh, has mentored aspiring mountaineers and adventure seekers to complete treks, including Mount Everest.

On 19 May 2023 Rajasekar Pachai, known as Kutty amongst the trekking community, created a world record as the first person from Tamil Nadu to summit Mt Everest at a height of 8848m under the mentorship and guidance of Singh and his team with getupandgo.

Singh is also a certified scuba diver with experience in bungee jumping, skydiving and paragliding.
