= Kripal Singh Shekhawat =

Indian Craftsman and ceramist

Shekhawat, Kripal Singh
- Born: 1922; Rajasthan, India
- Died: 15 February 2008 (aged 85–86); Jaipur, India
- Education: Shantiniketan
- Known for: Painting, Pottery
- Awards: Padma Shri

Kripal Singh Shekhawat (1922 – 15 February 2008) was a renowned craftsman and ceramist of India. He was famous for his skills in Blue Pottery of Jaipur and is credited for the revival of that art in India.

== Life and career ==
Born in Mau Rajasthan in 1922, he studied original painting at the Shanti Niketan in West Bengal and later did a diploma in Oriental Arts from the Tokyo University, Japan.

He was also the director of Sawai Ram Singh Shilpa Kala Mandir at Jaipur where he taught Indian painting and Blue Pottery.

He was conferred the Padma Shri in 1974 and was also honoured with the title Shilp Guru by the Government of India in 2002. Unknown to many, Kripal Singh is renowned for his illustrations in the original document of the Constitution of India.

He died on 15 February 2008 in Jaipur.

== Works ==
- Sharma, Bhawani Shankar, and Kripal Singh Shekhawat. 2007. Kripal Singh Shekhawat: virtuoso of line and colour. New Delhi: Lalit Kala Akademi. Chiefly color reproductions of the works of Indian artist Kripal Singh Shekhawat; includes brief biographical and critical text.
- Khandalavala, Karl J., and Kripal Singh Shekhawat. 1974. Wall paintings from Amber. New Delhi: Lalit Kalā Akademi. Portfolio comprising copies of the now damaged murals made by Kirpal Singh Shekhawat.
- Shesh, Hemant. 1984.Kripal Singh Shekhawat (In Hindi): Artist's detailed Monograph, Jaipur: Rajasthan Lalit Kala Academy includes biography and critical analysis on his art and pottery.
