= A. G. Kripal Singh =

Indian cricket player. (1933–1987)

A.G. Kripal Singh

Personal information
- Full name: Amritsar Govindsingh Kripal Singh
- Born: 6 August 1933; Madras, Madras State, British India
- Died: 22 July 1987 (aged 53); Chennai, Tamil Nadu, India
- Batting: Right-handed
- Bowling: Right-arm off-break
- Relatives: A. G. Ram Singh (father); A. G. Milkha Singh (brother); Arjan Kripal Singh (son)

International information
- National side: India (1955–1964)
- Test debut (cap 75): 19 November 1955 v New Zealand
- Last Test: 27 October 1964 v Australia

Career statistics
Competition	Test	First-class
Matches	14	96
Runs scored	422	4,939
Batting average	28.13	40.81
100s/50s	1/2	10/24
Top score	100*	208
Balls bowled	1,518	13,183
Wickets	10	177
Bowling average	58.40	28.41
5 wickets in innings	0	3
10 wickets in match	0	1
Best bowling	3/43	6/14
Catches/stumpings	4/–	57/–
- Source: ESPNcricinfo, 23 March 2018

Amritsar Govindsingh Kripal Singh (6 August 1933 – 22 July 1987) was an Indian Test cricketer.

== Life and career ==
Kripal Singh came from a famous cricketing family. His father A. G. Ram Singh was unlucky not to play for India, his brother Milkha Singh was a Test cricketer, and another brother, two sons, his daughter and a nephew all played first-class cricket. He was an attacking batsman and a useful off spin bowler.

He played a leading role in Madras winning the Ranji Trophy in 1954–55, scoring 636 runs and taking 13 wickets. In the semi-final against Bengal he hit 98 and 97 – the second innings runs came out of a total of 139 all out in which no one else reached double figures – and took 4 for 18 in the second innings. Kripal had university exams at the time of the final and was granted a postponement by the university. In the final against Holkar he scored 75 and 91 and seven wickets in a narrow victory. Earlier in the season he scored his career best score of 208 against Travancore-Cochin.

Picked for the Test series against New Zealand in the following season, he scored 100* on his debut. That was to remain his only Test hundred. He scored two other fifties, one a defiant 53 against West Indies in 1958–59.

Kripal toured England in 1959. He hit 178 against Lancashire and played in one Test where he scored 41. A finger injury severely limited his appearances. Though he remained within the sight of the selectors, his Test appearances were irregular thereafter. He played three Tests in 1961–62 and two in 1963–64, all against England. It was in the Third Test in 1961–62 that he took his first wicket in Test cricket. He had bowled 588 balls in nine innings and ten Tests prior to this, and no bowler has taken as many balls for his first wicket. In the same Test, he was involved in a scandal that ended the career of Subhash Gupte.

In one of the Test matches in 1963–64 when many English players went down with injury and illness, Kripal fielded for them almost as a permanent substitute. Towards the end of his career Kripal became more of a bowler. He captained Tamil Nadu, and South Zone in the first ever Duleep Trophy match.

He was born a Sikh, but between his Test appearances, Kripal fell in love with a Christian girl and converted to marry her and shaved off his beard and had hair cut.

Kripal died from a cardiac arrest at the age of 53. He was a national selector at the time of his death and had been due to become chairman of the selection committee in August 1987.

== Sources ==
- V. Ramnarayan, Mosquitos and other Jolly Rovers
- Mihir Bose, A History of Indian Cricket
- Christopher Martin-Jenkins, A Complete Who's Who of Test Cricketers
